= UAAP Season 88 =

University athletic year

- "Strength in Motion, Hope in Action"
- Host school: University of Santo Tomas

Overall
- Seniors: University of Santo Tomas
- Juniors: University of Santo Tomas

Collegiate champions
Sport		Men	Women
Basketball		La Salle	UST
Volleyball		NU	La Salle
Football		UP	FEU
Baseball		NU	NT
Softball		NT	Adamson
3x3 basketball		La Salle	UST
Athletics		NU	FEU
Badminton		Ateneo	Ateneo
Beach volleyball		UST	UST
Standard chess		UST	NU
Fencing		UE	UE
Judo		UST	UST
Swimming		Ateneo	UP
Table tennis		UST	FEU
Tennis		UST	NU
Taekwondo		NU	NU
Blitz chess		UST	FEU
Golf		La Salle (DS)	La Salle (DS)
- Poomsae: NU (Coed)
- Esports: NU (MLBB); NU (VALORANT); NU (eFIBA) (Ex - Coed)
- Cheerdance: NU (Ex - Coed)
- Street dance: UP (Ex - Coed)

High School champions
Sport		Boys	Girls
Basketball		FEU–D (19U); NUNS (16U)	UST
Volleyball		UE	NUNS
Football		FEU	NT
Baseball		Southridge	NT
3x3 basketball		FEU–D (19U); Ateneo (16U)	NUNS
Athletics		UST	Adamson
Beach volleyball		UST	UST
Standard chess		UST	UST
Fencing		UE	UST
Judo		UST	UST
Swimming		UST	UST
Table tennis		UST	UST
Tennis		UE (DS)	NT
Taekwondo		FEU–D	NUNS (DS)
Blitz chess		FEU–D	FEU–D
- Poomsae: UST (DS - Coed)
- Street dance: Adamson (Ex - Coed)
- (NT) = No tournament; (DS) = Demonstration Sport; (Ex) = Exhibition;

UAAP Season 88 was the 2025–26 season of the University Athletic Association of the Philippines (UAAP). It was hosted by the University of Santo Tomas (UST) under the theme "Strength in Motion, Hope in Action". The opening ceremony was held on September 19, 2025.

To accommodate the availability of student-athletes participating in the 2025 SEA Games, multiple sports were rescheduled, either starting earlier or outright moving to the second semester calendar including judo and taekwondo. The league also expanded its set of events, reintroducing the boys' division for baseball and debuting the boys' tournament for tennis.

After debuting as demonstration sports in Season 87, rapid chess was dropped from the calendar while blitz chess was elevated to regular sport status, meaning it would contribute to the general championship tally, the first sport added since 3x3 basketball in Season 82.

The league also introduced girls' kyorugi and high school poomsae as demonstration sports to the taekwondo tournament while golf debuted as a demonstration sport in both collegiate divisions for the first time. Along with the introduction of multiple new events this season, the UAAP also reintroduced streetdance as a stand-alone event independent of the closing ceremony and attracted a crowd of 4,515.

This season officially expanded the league calendar from 31 medal events in the collegiate division to 33, and from 24 to 27 in the high school, while adding one new special event to the collegiate division and three demonstration events to the high school ranks.

== Opening ceremony ==
The opening ceremony of the UAAP Season 88 was held at the University of Santo Tomas main campus in España, Sampaloc, Manila on September 19, 2025 in an event attended by 36,629 spectators.

The ceremonies were intended to rival the university's own trademark Paskuhan event and was held stand-alone independent of the opening gameday for the basketball tournament which was held the following day at the Quadricentennial Pavilion. This set-up was implemented during the last time UST hosted back in Season 79 in 2016.

A symbolic cauldron lighting featuring the school's UAAP alumni including Olympian EJ Obiena of athletics, Sisi Rondina of volleyball, Jervy Cruz of basketball, and Sydney Sy of judo served as the event's opening, followed by a parade of all eight universities featuring their student athletes. Musician alumni from the university including Kean Cipriano and Sarah Geronimo also performed before the closing concert which was headlined by artists Rob Deniel, Earl Agustin, and Lola Amour.

These ceremonies succeeded the Eraserheads-bannered opening ceremony hosted by the University of the Philippines in Season 87.

== Broadcasting ==
This is the fifth consecutive season of the UAAP's broadcast partnership with Cignal TV and the last under a five-year deal. On June 30, 2025, the two parties agreed to a renewal, extending Cignal's broadcast rights by another five years up to Season 93 in 2030–31.

Selected qualifying round team ties in Badminton were streamed through Pilipinas Live for the first time this season. Moreover, the final team ties in Table Tennis were also streamed for the first time since 2023.

== Sports calendar ==
=== First semester ===
Event (Division)	Event Sub-Host	Duration	Venue/s
Opening Ceremony	University of Santo Tomas	Sep 19, 2025	University of Santo Tomas Field
Basketball (Collegiate and 16U)	University of Santo Tomas	Sep 20 – Dec 17, 2025	Quadricentennial Pavilion; Araneta Coliseum; SM Mall of Asia Arena; Blue Eagle Gym
Football (Collegiate)	University of the Philippines	Sep 20 – Nov 16, 2025	Ayala Vermosa Sports Hub Football Field; UP Diliman Football Stadium
Volleyball (High School)	Far Eastern University	Sep 21 – Dec 14, 2025	Blue Eagle Gym; Adamson University Gym; Paco Arena; FEU Diliman Gym
Chess (Standard) (Collegiate and High School)	Adamson University	Sep 28 – Oct 19, 2025	Adamson University Gym
Badminton (Collegiate)	National University	Oct 11–22, 2025	Rizal Memorial Badminton Hall
Athletics (Collegiate and High School)	Ateneo de Manila University	Nov 6–9, 2025	New Clark City Athletics Stadium
Swimming (Collegiate and High School)	Ateneo de Manila University	Nov 6–9, 2025	New Clark City Aquatic Center
Table Tennis (Collegiate and High School)	University of the Philippines	Nov 15–21, 2025	Amoranto Sports Complex
Beach Volleyball (Collegiate)	National University	Nov 21–30, 2025	Sands at SM by the Bay
Cheerdance (Collegiate)	Ateneo de Manila University	Nov 29, 2025	SM Mall of Asia Arena

=== Second semester ===
Event (Division)	Event Sub-Host	Duration	Venue/s
Baseball (High School)	Adamson University	Jan 7 – Feb 23, 2026	Rizal Memorial Baseball Stadium
Basketball (19U)	Far Eastern University	Jan 11 – Mar 30, 2026	Blue Eagle Gym; Filoil Centre; Ninoy Aquino Stadium; Adamson University Gym
Football (Collegiate - continuation and High School)	University of the Philippines	Jan 15 – Apr 10, 2026	UP Diliman Football Stadium; Rizal Memorial Stadium
Beach Volleyball (High School)	National University	Feb 13 – 22, 2026	Sands at SM by the Bay
Volleyball (Collegiate)	University of Santo Tomas	Feb 14 – May 9, 2026	SM Mall of Asia Arena; Araneta Coliseum; Quadricentennial Pavilion; Filoil Centre
Tennis (Collegiate and High School)	Ateneo de Manila University	Feb 14 – Mar 29, 2026	Colegio San Agustin - Bulacan Tennis Court
Softball (Collegiate)	Adamson University	Feb 24 – Apr 10, 2026	Rizal Memorial Baseball Stadium
Baseball (Collegiate)	Adamson University	Feb 25 – Apr 21, 2026	Rizal Memorial Baseball Stadium
Fencing (Collegiate and High School)	University of the East	Mar 13–16, 2026	Makati Coliseum
Chess (Blitz) (Collegiate and High School)	Adamson University	Apr 10–12, 2026	Adamson University Gym
Judo (Collegiate and High School)	University of the East	Apr 11–12, 2026	Rizal Memorial Coliseum
Taekwondo (Poomsae) (Collegiate and High School)	De La Salle University	Apr 21, 2026	Rizal Memorial Coliseum
Taekwondo (Kyorugi) (Collegiate and High School)	De La Salle University	Apr 21–24, 2026	Rizal Memorial Coliseum
3x3 Basketball (Collegiate, 19U, and 16U)	De La Salle University	Apr 27 – May 3, 2026	Ayala Malls Manila Bay
Streetdance (Collegiate & High School)	Ateneo de Manila University	May 3, 2026	Blue Eagle Gym
Golf (Collegiate)	De La Salle University	May 11–14, 2026	Tagaytay Midlands Golf Club
Closing Ceremony	University of Santo Tomas	May 15, 2026	Quadricentennial Pavilion
Esports (Collegiate)	N/A	Aug 16 – Oct 20, 2026	MVP Studios; NAOS Esports Arena

== Basketball ==
The UAAP basketball championships began on September 20, 2025 for the men's and 16-and-under tournament, and on September 24 for the women's tournament.

The 19U boys' and 19U girls' tournaments began on January 11, 2026.

=== Men's tournament ===
==== Elimination round ====
Pos	Team	W	L	PCT	GB	Qualification
1	NU Bulldogs	11	3	.786	—	Twice-to-beat in the semifinals
2	UP Fighting Maroons	10	4	.714	1	Twice-to-beat in the semifinals
3	UST Growling Tigers (H)	8	6	.571 (Note: Head-to-head record: La Salle 1–1 UST (0 point differential); overall point differential: UST +61, La Salle +10)	3	Twice-to-win in the semifinals
4	De La Salle Green Archers	8	6	.571	3	Twice-to-win in the semifinals
5	FEU Tamaraws	7	7	.500	4	
6	Ateneo Blue Eagles	6	8	.429 (Note: Head-to-head record: Ateneo 2–0 Adamson)	5	
7	Adamson Soaring Falcons	6	8	.429	5	
8	UE Red Warriors	0	14	.000	11	

Source: Rappler
Rules for classification: 1) winning percentage; 2) if tied for #2 or #4, one-game playoff; 3) head-to-head record; 4) head-to-head point differential; 5) overall point differential:
(H) Hosts

==== Playoffs ====
Semifinals (Top 2 twice-to-beat)
1	NU	77	73
4	La Salle	87	78
2	UP	82
3	UST	81

Finals (Best-of-three playoff)
4	La Salle	74	63	80
2	UP	70	66	72

==== Awards ====
- Most Valuable Player: Janrey Pasaol (FEU Tamaraws)
- Rookie of the Year: Collins Akowe (UST Growling Tigers)

=== Women's tournament ===
==== Elimination round ====
Pos	Team	W	L	PCT	GB	Qualification
1	UST Growling Tigresses (H)	14	0	1.000	—	Advance to the Finals (Note: As UST won all of their elimination round games, the stepladder format was used instead of the regular Final Four format.)
2	NU Lady Bulldogs	12	2	.857	2	Advance to stepladder semifinal
3	Ateneo Blue Eagles	8	6	.571	6	Proceed to stepladder quarterfinal
4	Adamson Lady Falcons	7	7	.500	7	Proceed to stepladder quarterfinal
5	FEU Lady Tamaraws	6	8	.429	8	
6	De La Salle Lady Archers	6	8	.429	8	
7	UP Fighting Maroons	3	11	.214	11	
8	UE Lady Warriors	0	14	.000	14	

Source: Rappler
Rules for classification: 1) winning percentage; 2) if tied for #2 or #4, one-game playoff; 3) head-to-head record; 4) head-to-head
(H) Hosts

==== Playoffs ====
Stepladder quarterfinal (Single-elimination)
3	Ateneo	66
4	Adamson	56

Stepladder semifinal (Single-elimination)
2	NU	67
3	Ateneo	66

Finals (Best-of-three playoff)
1	UST	79	95	79
2	NU	84	70	64

==== Awards ====
- Most Valuable Player: Ann Pingol (NU Lady Bulldogs)
- Rookie of the Year: Erica De Luna (Ateneo Blue Eagles)

=== 19U boys' tournament ===
==== Elimination round ====
Pos	Team	W	L	PCT	GB	Qualification
1	NUNS Bullpups	12	2	.857	—	Twice-to-beat in the semifinals
2	FEU–D Baby Tamaraws (H)	11	3	.786 (Note: Second seed playoff: FEU 111–73 Ateneo)	1	Twice-to-beat in the semifinals
3	Ateneo Blue Eagles	11	3	.786	1	Twice-to-win in the semifinals
4	Zobel Junior Archers	8	6	.571	4	Twice-to-win in the semifinals
5	UE Junior Red Warriors	5	9	.357 (Note: Head-to-head record: UE 1–1 (+2) UST)	7	
6	UST Tiger Cubs	5	9	.357	7	
7	Adamson Baby Falcons	4	10	.286	8	
8	UPIS Junior Fighting Maroons	0	14	.000	12	

Rules for classification: 1) winning percentage; 2) if tied for #2 or #4, one-game playoff; 3) head-to-head record; 4) head-to-head point differential; 5) overall point differential:
(H) Hosts

==== Playoffs ====
Semifinals (Top 2 twice-to-beat)
1	NUNS	72
4	DLSZ	70
2	FEU–D	90
3	Ateneo	89

Finals (Best-of-three playoff)
1	NUNS	73	80	102
2	FEU–D	77	59	106*

=== 19U girls' tournament ===
==== Elimination round ====
Pos	Team	W	L	PCT	GB	Qualification
1	NUNS Lady Bullpups	5	1	.833 (Note: Head-to-head record: NUNS 1–1 (+10) UST)	—	Advance to the Finals
2	UST Junior Tigresses	5	1	.833	—	Advance to the Finals
3	Zobel Junior Lady Archers	2	4	.333	3	
4	Ateneo Blue Eagles	0	6	.000	5	

Rules for classification: 1) winning percentage; 2) if tied for #2 or #4, one-game playoff; 3) head-to-head record; 4) head-to-head point differential; 5) overall point differential

==== Finals ====
Team 1	Series	Team 2	Game 1	Game 2	Game 3
NUNS Lady Bullpups	0–2	UST Junior Growling Tigresses	87–96	74–76	–

=== 16U boys' tournament ===
==== Elimination round ====
Pos	Team	W	L	PCT	GB	Qualification
1	NUNS Bullpups	14	0	1.000	—	Advance to the Finals (Note: As NUNS won all of their elimination round games, the stepladder format was used instead of the regular Final Four format.)
2	UST Tiger Cubs (H)	10	4	.714	4	Advance to stepladder semifinal
3	FEU–D Baby Tamaraws	9	5	.643 (Note: Head-to-head record: FEU-Diliman 2–0 Adamson)	5	Proceed to stepladder quarterfinal
4	Adamson Baby Falcons	9	5	.643	5	Proceed to stepladder quarterfinal
5	UE Junior Red Warriors	8	6	.571	6	
6	Ateneo Blue Eagles	4	10	.286	10	
7	UPIS Junior Fighting Maroons	2	12	.143	12	
8	Zobel Junior Archers	0	14	.000	14	

Source: Rappler
Rules for classification: 1) winning percentage; 2) if tied for #2 or #4, one-game playoff; 3) head-to-head record; 4) head-to-head point differential; 5) overall point differential
(H) Hosts

==== Playoffs ====
Stepladder quarterfinal (Single-elimination)
3	FEU–D	90
4	Adamson	76

Stepladder semifinal (Single-elimination)
2	UST	75
3	FEU–D	82

Finals (Best-of-three playoff)
1	NUNS	79	82
3	FEU–D	49	72

==== Awards ====
- Most Valuable Player: Goodluck Okebata (UE Junior Red Warriors)
- Rookie of the Year: Rowie Cabañero (UST Tiger Cubs)

== Football ==
The UAAP football championships for the collegiate women's division will begin on September 20, 2025, while the collegiate men's division will start on September 21, 2025. The opening week will kick off at the Ayala Vermosa Sports Hub with the rest of the schedule continuing at the UP Diliman Football Stadium.

In a unique move for this season, the league will play the first round of eliminations until October, while the second round will continue until November, before resuming in January of the next year to give way for the national teams at the 2025 SEA Games and 2025 FIFA Women's Futsal World Cup.

=== Men's tournament ===
==== Elimination round ====
Pos	Team	Pld	W	D	L	GF	GA	GD	Pts	Qualification
1	UP Fighting Maroons (H)	12	9	2	1	20	7	+13	29	Twice-to-beat in the semifinals
2	FEU Tamaraws	12	8	2	2	23	8	+15	26	Twice-to-beat in the semifinals
3	UST Golden Booters	12	5	3	4	16	16	0	18	Twice-to-win in the semifinals
4	De La Salle Green Booters	12	4	4	4	14	12	+2	16	Twice-to-win in the semifinals
5	Ateneo Blue Eagles	12	4	3	5	21	18	+3	15	
6	Adamson Soaring Falcons	12	2	4	6	11	20	−9	10	
7	UE Red Warriors (Note: The UAAP Disciplinary Committee penalized UE with a deduction of three points in the league table following their walk-out in their September 28 match against Ateneo. The sanction is grounded in Article 30 of the PFF Disciplinary Code—Deduction of Points which allows for the removal of points in current or future PFF competitions.)	12	1	0	11	9	33	−24	0	

Source: The UAAP
(H) Hosts

==== Playoffs ====
Semifinals (Top 2 twice-to-beat)
1	UP (a.e.t.)	1
4	La Salle	0
2	FEU	1	3
3	UST	2	2

Final (Knockout)
1	UP (a.e.t.)	2
2	FEU	1

==== Awards ====
- Most Valuable Players: Charles Lobitaña (UP Fighting Maroons) and Florenz Tacardon (UP Fighting Maroons)
- Rookie of the Year: Kian Niu (FEU Tamaraws)
- Golden Boot: Selwyn Mamon (FEU Tamaraws)
- Best Striker: Selwyn Mamon (FEU Tamaraws)
- Best Midfielder: Dov Cariño (Ateneo Blue Eagles)
- Best Defender: Charles Lobitaña (UP Fighting Maroons)
- Best Goalkeeper: Fonzy Gonzalez (UP Fighting Maroons)
- Fair Play Award: UP Fighting Maroons

=== Women's tournament ===
==== Elimination round ====
Pos	Team	Pld	W	D	L	GF	GA	GD	Pts	Qualification
1	FEU Lady Tamaraws	8	8	0	0	23	3	+20	24	Qualification for the Final
2	De La Salle Lady Booters	8	4	0	4	10	8	+2	12	Qualification for the Final
3	Ateneo Blue Eagles	8	3	2	3	6	11	−5	11	
4	UST Lady Booters	8	2	3	3	7	9	−2	9	
5	UP Fighting Maroons (H)	8	0	1	7	3	18	−15	1	

Updated to match(es) played on November 5, 2025. Source: The UAAP
(H) Hosts

==== Finals ====
November 15, 2025
17:00

FEU Lady Tamaraws	2–0	De La Salle Lady Booters
Judie Arevalo 15'; Regine Rebosura 90+3'

UP Diliman Football Stadium, Quezon City

==== Awards ====
- Most Valuable Player: Jonela Albiño (FEU Lady Tamaraws)
- Rookie of the Year: Jodie Banzon (DLSU Lady Booters)
- Golden Boot: Judie Arevalo (FEU Lady Tamaraws)
- Best Striker: Jada Bicierro (Ateneo Blue Eagles)
- Best Midfielder: Regine Rebosura (FEU Lady Tamaraws)
- Best Defender: Elisha Lubiano (DLSU Lady Booters)
- Best Goalkeeper: Jessa May Lehayan (FEU Tamaraws)
- Fair Play Award: Ateneo Blue Eagles

=== Boys' tournament ===
==== Elimination round ====
Pos	Team	Pld	W	D	L	GF	GA	GD	Pts	Qualification
1	FEU–D Baby Tamaraws	12	10	1	1	30	0	+30	31	Qualification for semifinals
2	UST Junior Golden Booters	12	9	1	2	13	0	+13	28	Qualification for semifinals
3	DLSZ Junior Green Booters	12	6	2	4	5	0	+5	20	Qualification for semifinals
4	Southridge Admirals (G)	12	5	2	5	2	0	+2	17	Qualification for semifinals
5	Ateneo Blue Eagles	12	5	1	6	0	5	−5	16	
6	Adamson Baby Falcons	12	1	3	8	0	15	−15	6	
7	Claret Red Roosters (G)	12	1	0	11	0	30	−30	3	

Updated to match(es) played on January 17, 2026. Source:
(G) Guests

==== Playoffs ====
Semifinals (Knockout)
Mar 28
1	FEU	1
4	Southridge	0
Mar 28
2	UST	2
3	La Salle	1

Finals (Knockout)
April 10
1	FEU	2
2	UST	1

=== Awards ===
- Most Valuable Player: James Maxdell Torres (FEU–D Baby Tamaraws)
- Rookie of the Year: Marc Zoe Hayahay (Adamson Baby Falcons)
- Golden Boot: Argos Alingalan (UST Junior Golden Booters)
- Best Striker: Argos Alingalan (UST Junior Golden Booters)
- Best Midfielder: John Mark Visitacion (UST Junior Golden Booters)
- Best Defender: Jimm Leowell Fabella (FEU–D Baby Tamaraws)
- Best Goalkeeper: Zarius Timothy Patawaran (Ateneo Blue Eagles)
- Fair Play Award: Claret Red Roosters

== Volleyball ==
=== Men's tournament ===
==== Elimination round ====
Pos	Team	Pld	W	L	Pts	SW	SL	SR	SPW	SPL	SPR	Qualification
1	FEU Tamaraws	14	13	1	39	41	12	3.417	1167	1017	1.147	Twice-to-beat in the semifinals
2	NU Bulldogs	14	10 (Note: Second-seed playoff: NU 3–1 UST)	4	30	36	16	2.250	1220	1081	1.129	Twice-to-beat in the semifinals
3	UST Golden Spikers (H)	14	10	4	30	34	18	1.889	1223	1151	1.063	Twice-to-win in the semifinals
4	Ateneo Blue Eagles	14	7	7	20	28	29	0.966	1204	1167	1.032	Twice-to-win in the semifinals
5	De La Salle Green Spikers	14	6	8	17	23	32	0.719	1335	1375	0.971	
6	UE Red Warriors	14	4	10	12	18	34	0.529	1020	1149	0.888	
7	Adamson Soaring Falcons	14	3	11	10	20	38	0.526	1162	1271	0.914	
8	UP Fighting Maroons	14	3	11	10	17	37	0.459	1227	1347	0.911	

Source: UAAP Volleyball on Livestats
Rules for classification: 1) number of wins; 2) if tied for No. 2 or 4, one-game playoff; 3) match points; 4) sets ratio; 5) points ratio; 6) head-to-head record
(H) Host

==== Playoffs ====
Semifinals (Top 2 twice-to-beat)
1	FEU	3
4	Ateneo	2
2	NU	3
3	UST	0

Finals (Best-of-three playoff)
1	FEU	2	0
2	NU	3	3

==== Awards ====
- Most Valuable Player: Josh Ybañez (UST Golden Spikers)
- Finals Most Valuable Player: Leo Ordiales (NU Bulldogs)
- Rookie of the Year: Richard Besorio (Adamson Soaring Falcons)

=== Women's tournament ===
==== Elimination round ====
Pos	Team	Pld	W	L	Pts	SW	SL	SR	SPW	SPL	SPR	Qualification
1	De La Salle Lady Spikers	14	14	0	39	42	10	4.200	1212	983	1.233	Advance to the finals (Note: As La Salle won all of their elimination round games, the stepladder format will be used instead of the regular Final Four format.)
2	NU Lady Bulldogs	14	10	4	30	37	19	1.947	1218	1068	1.140	Proceed to stepladder round 2
3	Adamson Lady Falcons	14	9	5	28	31	16	1.938	898	785	1.144	Proceed to stepladder round 1
4	UST Golden Tigresses (H)	14	8 (Note: Fourth seed playoff: UST 3–1 FEU)	6	25	28	22	1.273	1124	1062	1.058	Proceed to stepladder round 1
5	FEU Lady Tamaraws	14	8	6	24	29	24	1.208	1113	1040	1.070	
6	UP Fighting Maroons	14	5	9	14	20	32	0.625	1053	1164	0.905	
7	Ateneo Blue Eagles	14	2	12	8	12	36	0.333	861	1058	0.814	
8	UE Lady Red Warriors	14	0	14	0	2	42	0.048	779	1110	0.702	

Source: UAAP Volleyball on Livestats
Rules for classification: 1) number of wins; 2) if tied for No. 2 or 4, one-game playoff; 3) match points; 4) sets ratio; 5) points ratio; 6) head-to-head record
(H) Host

==== Playoffs ====
Stepladder round 1 (Single-elimination)
3	Adamson	0
4	UST	3

Stepladder round 2 (Single-elimination)
2	NU	3
4	UST	1

Finals (Best-of-three series)
1	La Salle	3	3
2	NU	0	0

==== Awards ====
- Most Valuable Player: Shaina Nitura (Adamson Lady Falcons)
- Finals Most Valuable Player: Shevana Laput (De La Salle Lady Spikers)
- Rookie of the Year: Samantha Cantada (NU Lady Bulldogs)

=== Boys' tournament ===
==== Elimination round ====
Pos	Team	Pld	W	L	Pts	SW	SL	SR	SPW	SPL	SPR	Qualification
1	NUNS Bullpups	14	13	1	37	39	10	3.900	97	89	1.090	Twice-to-beat in the semifinals
2	UE Junior Red Warriors	14	11	3	32	38	16	2.375	112	110	1.018	Twice-to-beat in the semifinals
3	FEU–D Baby Tamaraws (H)	14	10	4	30	35	16	2.188	75	48	1.563	Twice-to-win in the semifinals
4	UST Junior Golden Spikers	14	9	5	29	31	17	1.824	110	112	0.982	Twice-to-win in the semifinals
5	Adamson Baby Falcons	14	7	7	22	26	23	1.130	89	97	0.918	
6	DLSZ Junior Green Spikers	14	4	10	12	15	32	0.469	97	79	1.228	
7	UP Junior Fighting Maroons	14	2	12	6	8	38	0.211	79	97	0.814	
8	Ateneo Blue Eagles	14	0	14	0	2	42	0.048	48	75	0.640	

Source: UAAP Volleyball on Livestats
Rules for classification: 1) number of wins; 2) if tied for No. 2 or 4, one-game playoff; 3) match points; 4) sets ratio; 5) points ratio; 6) head-to-head record
(H) Host

==== Playoffs ====
Semifinals (Top 2 twice-to-beat)
1	NU	0	3
4	UST	3	1
2	UE	2	3
3	FEU	3	2

Final (Best-of-three series)
1	NUNS	2	0
2	UE	3	3

==== Awards ====
- Most Valuable Player: Rainier Lorayes (UST Tiger Cubs)
- Finals Most Valuable Player: Paul Roque (UE Junior Red Warriors)
- Rookie of the Year: Justine Ray John Jusayan (UPIS Junior Fighting Maroons)

=== Girls' tournament ===
==== Elimination round ====
Pos	Team	Pld	W	L	Pts	SW	SL	SR	SPW	SPL	SPR	Qualification
1	NUNS Lady Bullpups	14	13	1	39	41	7	5.857	104	99	1.051	Twice-to-beat in the semifinals
2	Adamson Lady Baby Falcons	14	13	1	37	39	9	4.333	75	54	1.389	Twice-to-beat in the semifinals
3	FEU–D Lady Baby Tamaraws (H)	14	9	5	27	30	17	1.765	54	75	0.720	Twice-to-win in the semifinals
4	UST Junior Golden Tigresses	14	8	6	26	32	20	1.600	99	104	0.952	Twice-to-win in the semifinals
5	DLSZ Junior Lady Spikers	14	7	7	21	24	23	1.043	75	50	1.500	
6	UP Junior Fighting Maroons	14	4	10	11	13	33	0.394	75	50	1.500	
7	Ateneo Blue Eagles	14	1	13	4	7	39	0.179	50	75	0.667	
8	UE Junior Lady Warriors	14	1	13	3	3	40	0.075	50	75	0.667	

Source: UAAP Volleyball on Livestats
Rules for classification: 1) number of wins; 2) if tied for No. 2 or 4, one-game playoff; 3) match points; 4) sets ratio; 5) points ratio; 6) head-to-head record
(H) Host

==== Playoffs ====
Semifinals (Top 2 twice-to-beat)
1	NUNS	3
4	UST	1
2	Adamson	2	2
3	FEU	3	3

Final (Best-of-three series)
1	NUNS	3	3
3	FEU	2	0

==== Awards ====
- Most Valuable Player: Diza Marie Berayo (NUNS Lady Bullpups)
- Finals Most Valuable Player: Rain Navarro (NUNS Lady Bullpups)
- Rookie of the Year: Jhaynna Love Bulandres (NUNS Lady Bullpups)

== Chess ==
The UAAP chess championships held two separate events as regular sports for the first time with standard chess starting on September 28, 2025 and blitz chess on April 10, 2026. The tournament venue was the Adamson University Gym in Manila.

=== Standard ===
==== Men's tournament ====
===== Team standings =====
Pos	Team	MP	BP
1st place, gold medalist(s)	UST Male Woodpushers	16.0	27.5
2nd place, silver medalist(s)	FEU Tamaraws	14.0	25.0
3rd place, bronze medalist(s)	De La Salle Green Woodpushers	11.0	19.5
4	Ateneo Blue Eagles	9.0	19.5
5	UP Fighting Maroons	8.0	17.5
6	Adamson Soaring Falcons (H)	2.0	11.0

Source: UAAP Chess Results
(H) Host

==== Awards ====
- Most Valuable Player: Chester Neil Reyes (UST Male Woodpushers)
- Rookie of the Year: Rigil Pahamtang (De La Salle Green Woodpushers)

==== Women's tournament ====
===== Team standings =====
Pos	Team	MP	BP
1st place, gold medalist(s)	NU Lady Bulldogs	25.0	31.5
2nd place, silver medalist(s)	De La Salle Lady Woodpushers	23.0	30.5
3rd place, bronze medalist(s)	FEU Lady Tamaraws	21.0	34.0
4	UST Female Woodpushers	16.0	25.0
5	Ateneo Blue Eagles	12.0	22.0
6	Adamson Lady Falcons (H)	9.0	13.0
7	UP Fighting Maroons	6.0	12.0

Source: UAAP Chess Results
(H) Host

==== Awards ====
- Most Valuable Player: Allanney Doroy (NU Lady Bulldogs)
- Rookie of the Year: Jersey Marticio (NU Lady Bulldogs)

==== Boys' tournament ====
===== Team standings =====
Pos	Team	MP	BP
1st place, gold medalist(s)	UST Junior Male Woodpushers	19.0	23.5
2nd place, silver medalist(s)	FEU–D Baby Tamaraws	15.0	22.5
3rd place, bronze medalist(s)	Adamson Baby Falcons (H)	12.0	17.0
4	Ateneo Blue Eagles	8.0	9.0
5	De La Salle Junior Green Woodpushers	6.0	8.0

Source: UAAP Chess Results
(H) Host

==== Awards ====
- Most Valuable Player: Gabriel Paradero (UST Junior Male Woodpushers)
- Rookie of the Year: Quarl Vera Cruz (FEU–D Baby Tamaraws)

==== Girls' tournament ====
===== Team standings =====
Pos	Team	MP	BP
1st place, gold medalist(s)	UST Junior Female Woodpushers	16.0	31.0
2nd place, silver medalist(s)	NUNS Lady Bullpups	16.0	29.0
3rd place, bronze medalist(s)	FEU–D Lady Baby Tamaraws	14.0	29.5
4	Adamson Lady Baby Falcons (H)	10.0	17.0
5	Ateneo Blue Eagles	2.0	8.0
6	De La Salle Junior Lady Woodpushers	2.0	5.5

Source: UAAP Chess Results
(H) Host

==== Awards ====
- Most Valuable Player: Ruelle Canino (FEU–D Lady Baby Tamaraws)
- Rookie of the Year: Ma. Louise Penaverde (Adamson Lady Baby Falcons)

=== Blitz ===
==== Men's tournament ====
===== Team standings =====
Pos	Team	MP	BP	Qualification
1	UST Male Woodpushers	10.0	60.5	Qualification for semifinals
2	FEU Tamaraws	7.0	52.5	Qualification for semifinals
3	De La Salle Green Woodpushers	7.0	45.0	Qualification for semifinals
4	Ateneo Blue Eagles	4.0	32.5	Qualification for semifinals
5	UP Fighting Maroons	8.0	17.5	
6	Adamson Soaring Falcons (H)	0.0	20.0	

Source: UAAP Blitz Chess Results
(H) Host

==== Bracket ====
Semifinals (Single-elimination)
April 12
1	UST	3.5	3	3
4	Ateneo	0.5	1	1
April 12
2	FEU	4	2.5	1.5	2
3	La Salle	0	1.5	2.5	2

Finals (Single-elimination)
April 12
1	UST	4	2.5	2
2	FEU	0	1.5	2
Third place (Single-elimination)
April 12
4	Ateneo	0.5	2	0
3	La Salle	3.5	2	4

==== Awards ====
- Most Valuable Player: Mark Jay Bacojo (FEU Tamaraws)
- Rookie of the Year: Jerish John Velarde (FEU Tamaraws)

==== Women's tournament ====
===== Team standings =====
Pos	Team	MP	BP	Qualification
1	FEU Lady Tamaraws	13.0	70.0	Qualification for semifinals
2	De La Salle Lady Woodpushers	11.0	55.5	Qualification for semifinals
3	NU Lady Bulldogs	9.0	61.0	Qualification for semifinals
4	Ateneo Blue Eagles	8.0	48.5	Qualification for semifinals
5	UST Female Woodpushers	8.0	47.0	
6	UP Fighting Maroons	4.0	30.0	
7	Adamson Lady Falcons (H)	3.0	24.0	

Source: UAAP Blitz Chess Results
(H) Host

==== Bracket ====
Semifinals (Single-elimination)
April 12
1	FEU	2	2.5	2.5
4	Ateneo	2	1.5	1.5
April 12
2	La Salle	3	2	2.5	2
3	NU	1	2	1.5	2

Finals (Single-elimination)
April 12
1	FEU	2	2	3	3
2	La Salle	2	2	1	1
Third place (Single-elimination)
April 12
4	Ateneo	2.5	3.5	1.5	3
3	NU	1.5	0.5	2.5	1

==== Awards ====
- Most Valuable Player: Vic Derotas (FEU Lady Tamaraws)
- Rookie of the Year: Juzela Marielle Agne (DLSU Lady Woodpushers)

==== Boys' tournament ====
===== Team standings =====
Pos	Team	MP	BP	Qualification
1	UST Junior Male Woodpushers	10.0	49.5	Qualification for finals
2	FEU–D Baby Tamaraws	8.0	49.5	Qualification for finals
3	Adamson Baby Falcons (H)	6.0	39.0	
4	Ateneo Blue Eagles	4.0	21.5	
5	DLSZ Junior Green Woodpushers	2.0.0	0.5	

Source: UAAP Blitz Chess Results
(H) Host

==== Finals ====
Team 1	Series	Team 2	Game 1	Game 2	Game 3
UST Junior Male Woodpushers	0.5–2.5	FEU–D Baby Tamaraws	1–3	2–2	1.5–2.5

==== Awards ====
- Most Valuable Player: King Xyan Beltran (FEU–D Baby Tamaraws)
- Rookie of the Year: Lord Yofiel Young (FEU–D Baby Tamaraws)

==== Girls' tournament ====
===== Team standings =====
Pos	Team	MP	BP	Qualification
1	FEU–D Lady Baby Tamaraws	9.0	66.5	Qualification for semifinals
2	UST Junior Female Woodpushers	9.0	60.0	Qualification for semifinals
3	NUNS Lady Bullpups	6.0	56.0	Qualification for semifinals
4	Adamson Lady Baby Falcons (H)	4.0	56.0	Qualification for semifinals
5	De La Salle Junior Lady Woodpushers	2.0	14.0	
6	Ateneo Blue Eagles	0.0	17.0	

Source: UAAP Blitz Chess Results
(H) Host

==== Bracket ====
Semifinals (Single-elimination)
April 12
1	FEU–D	4	4	2.5
4	Adamson	0	0	1.5
April 12
2	UST	L
3	NUNS	W

Finals (Single-elimination)
April 12
1	FEU–D	3	3.5	3
3	NUNS	1	0.5	1
Third place (Single-elimination)
April 12
4	Adamson	1	1	0
2	UST	3	3	4

==== Awards ====
- Most Valuable Player: Ruelle Canino (FEU–D Lady Baby Tamaraws)
- Rookie of the Year: LJ Getubig (FEU–D Lady Baby Tamaraws)

== Badminton ==
The UAAP badminton championships began on October 11, 2024. The tournament venue is the Rizal Memorial Badminton Hall in Manila. This is also the first badminton season to have all game days be televised.

=== Men's tournament ===
==== Elimination round ====
===== Team standings =====
Pos	Team	Pld	W	L	MF	MA	MD	GF	GA	GD	Pts	Qualification
1	Ateneo Blue Eagles	5	5	0	17	3	+14	45	8	+37	5	Advance to the semifinals
2	NU Bulldogs (H)	5	4	1	16	9	+7	36	20	+16	4	Advance to the semifinals
3	UP Fighting Maroons	5	3	2	14	13	+1	35	22	+13	3	Advance to the semifinals
4	De La Salle Green Shuttlers	5	1	4	7	17	−10	23	35	−12	1 (Note: Playoff stage 1: UST 3–0 Adamson; playoff stage 2: La Salle 3–0 UST)	Advance to the semifinals
5	UST Tiger Shuttlers	5	1	4	6	15	−9	16	43	−27	1	
6	Adamson Soaring Falcons	5	1	4	6	19	−13	14	41	−27	1	

Source: The UAAP
Rules for classification: 1) winning percentage; 2) if tied #4, one-game playoff; 3) head-to-head record; 4) head-to-head point differential; 5) if multiple tied #4, match wins then match differential
(H) Host

===== Match-up results =====
Team ╲ Game	1	2	3	4	5
Adamson	NU school colors	UST school colors	Ateneo school colors	La Salle school colors	UP school colors
Ateneo	La Salle school colors	UP school colors	Adamson school colors	UST school colors	NU school colors
La Salle	Ateneo school colors	NU school colors	UP school colors	Adamson school colors	UST school colors
NU	Adamson school colors	La Salle school colors	UST school colors	UP school colors	Ateneo school colors
UP	UST school colors	Ateneo school colors	La Salle school colors	NU school colors	Adamson school colors
UST	UP school colors	Adamson school colors	NU school colors	Ateneo school colors	La Salle school colors

= Win; = Loss

===== Scores =====
Teams	AdU	ATENEO	DLSU	NU	UP	UST
Adamson Soaring Falcons	—	0–5	3–2	1–4	0–5	2–3
Ateneo Blue Eagles		—	5–0	4–1	3–2	5–0
De La Salle Green Shuttlers			—	2–3	1–4	4–1
NU Bulldogs				—	4–1	4–1
UP Fighting Maroons					—	4–1
UST Tiger Shuttlers						—

Legend: Blue = left column team win; Red = top row team win.

==== Fourth seed playoffs ====
Playoff stage 1 (Single-elimination)		Playoff stage 2 (Single-elimination)
		La Salle	3
UST	3	UST	0
Adamson	0

===== Playoff stage 1 =====
October 19; 8:00 AM	UST Tiger Shuttlers	3–0	Adamson Soaring Falcons	Rizal Memorial Badminton Hall; Umpire(s): Andres Dionisio

Report	Individual matches
Lennox Cuilao	2–1	John Oliveros	21–19, 19–21, 21–10
Ivan Tuazon	2–0	Kyrik Roldan	21–7, 21–10
Ron Galve / Bien Miraflor	2–0	Nathaniel Acedillo / John Oliveros	21–19, 21–17

===== Playoff stage 2 =====
October 20; 8:00 AM	De La Salle Green Shuttlers	3–0	UST Tiger Shuttlers	Rizal Memorial Badminton Hall

Report	Individual matches
Lovic Javier	2–0	Aaron Bendaña	22–20, 21–11
James Capin	2–0	Angelo Tuazon	21–14, 21–16
Joshua Morada / Yuan Tan	2–1	Ron Galve / Bien Miraflor	22–20, 20–22, 21–17

==== Bracket ====
Semifinals (Single-elimination)
October 21
1	Ateneo	3
4	La Salle	0
October 21
2	NU	1
3	UP	3

Finals (Single-elimination)
October 22
1	Ateneo	3
3	UP	0
Third place (Single-elimination)
October 22
4	La Salle	1
2	NU	3

==== Semifinals ====
Ateneo secured its fourth-straight finals berth, spoiling La Salle's first semifinal appearance in six years. NU was eliminated from finals contention for the first time in 15 years while UP advanced to the finals for the first time in seven years.

October 21; 8:00 AM	Ateneo Blue Eagles	3–0	De La Salle Green Shuttlers	Rizal Memorial Badminton Hall

Report	Individual matches
Lyrden Laborte	2–0	Joshua Cuarte	21–17, 21–16
Jamal Pandi	2–0	Lovic Javier	21–14, 21–17
Lyrden Laborte / Robert Ramos	2–1	Joshua Morada / Yuan Tan	21–12, 19–21, 21–16

October 21; 8:00 AM	NU Bulldogs	1–3	UP Fighting Maroons	Rizal Memorial Badminton Hall

Report	Individual matches
Marc Joel Perez	0–2	Jewel Albo	10–21, 9–21
Benjamin Dictado	0–2	Kervin Llanes	19–21, 15–21
Lanz Zafra / Marc Joel Perez	2–1	Jewel Albo / Mark Bernal	21–16, 19–21, 21–17
John Gam / James Villarante	1–2	Arjay Lazareto / Ryan Mendoza	21–19, 13–21, 19–21

==== Third place playoff ====
October 22; 8:00 AM	NU Bulldogs	3–1	De La Salle Green Shuttlers	Rizal Memorial Badminton Hall

Report	Individual matches
Lanz Zafra	2–0	James Capin	21–7, 21–10
Benjamin Dictado	0–2	Lovic Javier	14–21, 10–21
Marc Joel Perez / Lanz Zafra	2–0	Joshua Cuarte / Zaki Layno	21–18, 21–19
John Gam / James Villarante	2–0	Joshua Morada / Yuan Tan	21–14, 21–18

==== Finals ====
Ateneo won its sixth championship following their fifth-straight finals appearance while UP clinched its first silver medal in their first finals appearance since Season 81. This is the first time both teams have faced each other in the finals.

October 22; 8:00 AM	Ateneo Blue Eagles	3–0	UP Fighting Maroons	Rizal Memorial Badminton Hall; Umpire(s): Cyruz Mann Dela Rosa, Archilito Mayola

Report	Individual matches
Jamal Pandi	2–0	Jewel Albo	21–15, 21–19
Lyrden Laborte	2–1	Kervin Llanes	17–21, 21–15, 21–8
Arthur Salvado / Jamal Pandi	2–0	Jewel Albo / Mark Bernal	24–22, 21–11

==== Awards ====
- Most Valuable Player: Lyrden Laborte (Ateneo Blue Eagles)
- Rookie of the Year: Jamal Pandi (Ateneo Blue Eagles) and Lovic Javier (De La Salle Green Shuttlers)

=== Women's tournament ===
==== Elimination round ====
===== Team standings =====
Pos	Team	Pld	W	L	MF	MA	MD	GF	GA	GD	Pts	Qualification
1	Ateneo Blue Eagles	5	5	0	18	2	+16	48	10	+38	5	Advance to the semifinals
2	UP Fighting Maroons	5	4	1	14	10	+4	34	25	+9	4	Advance to the semifinals
3	NU Lady Bulldogs (H)	5	3	2	10	11	−1	34	25	+9	3	Advance to the semifinals
4	UST Lady Shuttlers	5	1	4	8	18	−10	25	31	−6	1 (Note: Playoff stage 1: La Salle 3–2 Adamson; playoff stage 2: UST 3–1 La Salle)	Advance to the semifinals
5	De La Salle Lady Shuttlers	5	1	4	7	15	−8	19	31	−12	1	
6	Adamson Lady Falcons	5	1	4	7	18	−11	14	52	−38	1	

Source: The UAAP
Rules for classification: 1) winning percentage; 2) if tied #4, one-game playoff; 3) head-to-head record; 4) head-to-head point differential; 5) if multiple tied #4, match wins then match differential
(H) Host

===== Match-up results =====
Team ╲ Game	1	2	3	4	5
Adamson	UP school colors	UST school colors	Ateneo school colors	La Salle school colors	NU school colors
Ateneo	La Salle school colors	NU school colors	Adamson school colors	UST school colors	UP school colors
La Salle	Ateneo school colors	UP school colors	NU school colors	Adamson school colors	UST school colors
NU	UST school colors	Ateneo school colors	La Salle school colors	UP school colors	Adamson school colors
UP	Adamson school colors	La Salle school colors	UST school colors	NU school colors	Ateneo school colors
UST	NU school colors	Adamson school colors	UP school colors	Ateneo school colors	La Salle school colors

= Win; = Loss

===== Scores =====
Teams	AdU	ATENEO	DLSU	NU	UP	UST
Adamson Lady Falcons	—	0–5	2–3	1–4	1–4	3–2
Ateneo Blue Eagles		—	5–0	4–1	5–0	4–1
De La Salle Lady Shuttlers			—	2–3	2–3	1–4
NU Lady Bulldogs				—	2–3	4–1
UP Fighting Maroons					—	4–1
UST Lady Shuttlers						—

Legend: Blue = left column team win; Red = top row team win.

==== Fourth seed playoffs ====
Playoff stage 1 (Single-elimination)		Playoff stage 2 (Single-elimination)
		UST	3
La Salle	3	La Salle	1
Adamson	2

===== Playoff stage 1 =====
October 19; 1:00 PM	De La Salle Lady Shuttlers	3–2	Adamson Lady Falcons	Rizal Memorial Badminton Hall; Umpire(s): Kurt Encisa

Report	Individual matches
Ghiselle Baustisa	1–2	Marriane Barcelona	15–21, 21–17, 16–21
Lady Tuario	2–0	Khylle Agura	21–13, 21–12
Viana Antonio / Ghiselle Baustisa	2–0	Ma. Rheylyn Pedron / Keanna Casaje	21–8, 21–15
Ma. Army Espe / Mia Manguilimotan	1–2	Khylle Agura / Marriane Barcelona	21–11, 13–21, 25–27
Mia Manguilimotan	2–0	Key Fuerte	21–14, 21–14

===== Playoff stage 2 =====
October 20; 1:00 PM	UST Lady Shuttlers	3–1	De La Salle Lady Shuttlers	Rizal Memorial Badminton Hall

Report	Individual matches
Christine Dorega	0–2	Mia Manguilimotan	11–21, 13–21
Hanie De Jesus	2–1	Lady Tuario	21–16, 19–21, 21–18
Jennifer Saladaga / Rhafi Santos	2–0	Viana Antonio / Ghiselle Bautista	21–17, 21–15
Marielle Alvarez / Hanie De Jesus	2–0	Ma. Army Espe / Mia Manguilimotan	21–17, 21–17

==== Bracket ====
Semifinals (Single-elimination)
October 21
1	Ateneo	3
4	UST	0
October 21
2	UP	2
3	NU	3

Finals (Single-elimination)
October 22
1	Ateneo	3
3	NU	0
Third place (Single-elimination)
October 22
4	UST	0
2	UP	3

==== Semifinals ====
Ateneo advanced to its fifth-straight finals while NU clinched its first-ever finals berth, eliminating defending champion UP from contention.

October 21; 1:00 PM	Ateneo Blue Eagles	3–0	UST Lady Shuttlers	Rizal Memorial Badminton Hall

Report	Individual matches
Mika De Guzman	2–0	Hanie De Jesus	21–4, 21–9
Althea Ocampo	2–0	Christine Dorega	21–8, 21–7
Mika De Guzman / Jochelle Alvarez	2–0	Jennifer Saladaga / Rhafi Santos	21–10, 21–11

October 21; 1:00 PM	UP Fighting Maroons	2–3	NU Lady Bulldogs	Rizal Memorial Badminton Hall; Umpire(s): Emmanuel Dayawon, Geyren John Baluran

Report	Individual matches
Brys Fuggan	0–2	Ysabel Amora	10–21, 20–22
Anthea Gonzales	2–0	Hailene Diaz	21–8, 21–18
Krissa De Leon / Susmita Ramos	2–0	Ysabel Amora / Alysa Desacola	21–13, 21–12
Brys Fuggan / Anthea Gonzales	0–2	Hallene Diaz / Alhana Mabale	18–21, 16–21
Susmita Ramos	1–2	Karyll Rio	21–8, 20–22, 21–13

==== Third place playoff ====
October 22; 8:00 AM	UP Fighting Maroons	3–0	UST Lady Shuttlers	Rizal Memorial Badminton Hall

Report	Individual matches
Susmita Ramos	2–0	Reshine Nicor	21–19, 22–20
Thea Gonzales	2–0	Hanie De Jesus	21–15, 21–8
Krissa De Leon / Trisha Postrano	2–0	Jennifer Saladaga & Rhafi Santos	21–18, 21–18

==== Finals ====
Ateneo won their ninth championship and their fifth in six seasons while NU finished with their first-ever silver medal in their first finals appearance.

October 22; 1:00 PM	Ateneo Blue Eagles	3–0	NU Lady Bulldogs	Rizal Memorial Badminton Hall; Umpire(s): Archilito Mayola

Report	Individual matches
Mika De Guzman	2–0	Hallene Diaz	21–8, 21–8
Althea Ocampo	2–1	Ysabel Amora	17–21, 21–12, 21–13
Mika De Guzman / Jochelle Alvarez	2–0	Ysabel Amora / Alysa Desacola	21–6, 21–10

==== Awards ====
- Most Valuable Player: Mika De Guzman (Ateneo Blue Eagles)
- Rookie of the Year: Brys Fuggan (UP Fighting Maroons) and Hanie De Jesus (UST Lady Shuttlers)

== Athletics ==
Pos.	Pts.
1st	15
2nd	12
3rd	10
4th	8
5th	6
6th	4
7th	2
8th	1

The UAAP athletics championships were held from November 6–9, 2025 at the New Clark City Athletics Stadium in Capas, Tarlac.

Originally scheduled to run until November 10, due to the Super Typhoon Uwan, the third and fourth days were condensed while the fifth day of competition was moved forward to the fourth day, with all track events having their heats serve as direct final events.

Ranking is determined by a point system, similar to that of the overall championship. The points given are based on the athlete's/team's finish in the finals of an event, which include only the top eight finishers from the preliminaries. The gold medalist(s) receive 15 points, silver gets 12, bronze has 10. The following points: 8, 6, 4, 2 and 1 are given to the rest of the participating athletes/teams according to their order of finish.

=== Men's tournament ===
==== Team standings ====
Rank	Team	Medals				Points
Rank	Team	1st place, gold medalist(s)	2nd place, silver medalist(s)	3rd place, bronze medalist(s)	Total	Points
1st place, gold medalist(s)	NU Bulldogs	3.5	4	9	16.5	298.5
2nd place, silver medalist(s)	FEU Tamaraws	5	6	1	12	272.25
3rd place, bronze medalist(s)	UP Fighting Maroons	3	2	8	13	213.25
4	UST Tiger Tracksters	5	3	2	10	205
5	Ateneo Blue Eagles (H)	4	4	1	9	150
6	Adamson Soaring Falcons	1	2.5	1	4.5	90.25
7	UE Red Warriors	1	1	0.5	2.5	70
8	De La Salle Green Tracksters	1	1	1	3	52.25

===== Awards =====
- Most Valuable Player: Russel Ricaforte (Ateneo Blue Eagles) and Hokett Delos Santos (UST Tiger Tracksters)
- Rookie of the Year: Hussein Loraña (Ateneo Blue Eagles)

=== Women's tournament ===
==== Team standings ====
Rank	Team	Medals				Points
Rank	Team	1st place, gold medalist(s)	2nd place, silver medalist(s)	3rd place, bronze medalist(s)	Total	Points
1st place, gold medalist(s)	FEU Lady Tamaraws	8	5	8	21	373.5
2nd place, silver medalist(s)	UST Lady Tracksters	5	3	3	11	242
3rd place, bronze medalist(s)	De La Salle Lady Tracksters	5	4	3	12	217.75
4	UP Fighting Maroons	1	6	2	9	184
5	UE Lady Warriors	2	2	4.5	8.5	175.75
6	Adamson Lady Falcons	1	1.5	2	4.5	83
7	NU Lady Bulldogs	1.5	2	1	4.5	62.5
8	Ateneo Blue Eagles (H)	0	0	0	0	15

==== Awards ====
- Most Valuable Player: Edna Magtubo (FEU Lady Tamaraws)
- Rookie of the Year: Jecel Vivas (FEU Lady Tamaraws)

=== Boys' tournament ===
==== Team standings ====
Rank	Team	Medals				Points
Rank	Team	1st place, gold medalist(s)	2nd place, silver medalist(s)	3rd place, bronze medalist(s)	Total	Points
1st place, gold medalist(s)	UST Junior Tiger Tracksters	0	0	0	0	388.5
2nd place, silver medalist(s)	Adamson Baby Falcons	0	0	0	0	311
3rd place, bronze medalist(s)	NUNS Bullpups	0	0	0	0	305
4	UE Junior Red Warriors	0	0	0	0	220
5	DLSZ Junior Green Tracksters	0	0	0	0	36
6	Ateneo Blue Eagles (H)	0	0	0	0	18

===== Awards =====
- Most Valuable Player: Jerico Cadag (NUNS Bullpups)

=== Girls' tournament ===
==== Team standings ====
Rank	Team	Medals				Points
Rank	Team	1st place, gold medalist(s)	2nd place, silver medalist(s)	3rd place, bronze medalist(s)	Total	Points
1st place, gold medalist(s)	Adamson Lady Baby Falcons	0	0	0	0	457
2nd place, silver medalist(s)	UST Junior Lady Tracksters	0	0	0	0	446.5
3rd place, bronze medalist(s)	UE Junior Lady Warriors	0	0	0	0	387
4	DLSZ Junior Lady Tracksters	0	0	0	0	8
5	Ateneo Blue Eagles (H)	0	0	0	0	0

===== Awards =====
- Most Valuable Player: Franceine Rosario (UST Junior Lady Tracksters)
- Rookie of the Year: Rhian Encomienda (UE Junior Lady Warriors)

=== Medalists ===
==== Men's ====
Event	Gold		Silver		Bronze	
100m	John Paul Araneta; UST	10.84	Clint Nino Neri; UP	10.86	Alhryan Labita; UP	10.90
200m	Kent Francis Jardin; Adamson	21.58	Andreas Womack; FEU	21.70	Alhryan Labita; UP	21.85
400m	Alhryan Labita; UP	47.77	Hussein Loraña; Ateneo	48.18	John Lloyd Cabalo; NU	48.30
800m	Hussein Loraña; Ateneo	1:52.71	Gervickson Labora; FEU	1:53.47	Hassan Loraña; Ateneo	1:53.89
1500m	Alfrence Braza; FEU	3:58.04	Noli Torre; NU	4:00.02	Rico Jay Patanao; NU	4:00.18
5000m	Roy Laudit; UP	15:23.30	Noli Torre; NU	15:29.84	Rico Jay Patanao; NU	15:36.12
10000m	Rico Jay Patanao; NU	32:44.72	Alfrence Braza; FEU	32:52.39	Roy Laudit; UP	33:56.66
110m hurdles	Hokett Delos Santos; UST	14.80	Joseph Antiola III; FEU	14.84	Mark John Paculanang; NU	15.08
400m hurdles	Jazzpeer Lanz Arcenal; FEU	53.44	Er Yake Mengorio; Ateneo	53.84	Alhryan Labita; UP	55.10
3000m steeplechase	Noli Torre; NU	9:28.24	Rico Jay Patanao; NU	9:39.93	Renz Cruz; NU	9:40.21
5000m walk	Carlos De Imus; FEU	21:17.04 CR	Vincent Vianmar Dela Cruz; UE	21:58.72 SR	John Aaron Arandia; NU	23:31.64
10000m walk	Vincent Vianmar Dela Cruz; UE	45:12.61 CR	Carlos De Imus; FEU	46:25.25 SR	John Aaron Arandia; NU	48:23.23 SR
4 × 100m relay	FEU; Pacifico Tolentino IV; Joseph Antiola III; Joshua Bercasio; Andreas Womack	41.58 CR	UST; Sean Harry Narag; Jasper Obanon; Hokett Delos Santos; John Paul Araneta	42.10	UP; Leolan Oranza; Clint Nino Neri; Meynard Guillermo; Alhryan Labita	42.25
4 × 400m relay	Ateneo; Matthew Luis Angeles; Er Yake Mengorio; Hassan Loraña; Hussein Loraña	3:14.85	NU; Kharis Lark Reil Pantonial; John Masuhol; Kyrex Marasigan; John Lloyd Cabalo	3:15.08	UST; Jasper Obanon; Gerald Mark Casimiro; Sean Harry Narag; Hokett Delos Santos	3:20.80
High jump	Ernie Calipay; FEU	2.05 m	Kurt David Ragudos; Adamson	1.90 m	Kenn Lucero; NU	1.90 m
Pole vault	Hokett Delos Santos; UST	4.50 m	Mejen Sumbongan; UST	4.30 m	Sean Harry Narag; UST	4.20 m
Long jump	Joshua Patorara; La Salle	7.44 m CR	Kent Francis Jardin; Adamson	7.38 m	Clint Nino Neri; UP	7.17 m
Triple jump	Ranier Sobrepeña; UP	15.42 m CR	Joshua Patorara; La Salle	15.11 m	Clint Nino Neri; UP	14.48 m
Shot put	Russel Je Ricaforte; Ateneo	14.92 m	Airex Gabriel Villanueva; Ateneo	13.53 m	Jake Jacob Saga; UP	13.28 m
Discus throw	Russel Je Ricaforte; Ateneo	52.62 m CR	Neil Jasper Salvador; UP	43.70 m	Dominic Johilio Woodard; NU	42.31 m
Javelin throw	John Allen Butiong; UST	59.65 m	Emilio Roman Perez; Ateneo	59.28 m	Nielmar Medrocillo; La Salle	58.07 m
Hammer throw	Jhon Laurenze Ballelos; UST	47.33 m	John Nicholan Pangan; UST	43.51 m	Daniel Noel Angelo Rambacal; Adamson	43.01 m
Decathlon	Larry Taripe Jr. NU	5779	Ronel Juntilla; FEU	5522	Rolly Royo Jr. FEU	5444
WR world record | AR area record | CR championship record | GR games record | NR national record | OR Olympic record | PB personal best | SB season best | WL world leading (in a given season)

==== Women's ====
Event	Gold		Silver		Bronze	
100m	Lianne Diana Pama; UST	11.82	Shane Joy Ponce; FEU	12.00	Annie Rose Mercurio; FEU	12.24
200m	Lianne Diana Pama; UST	24.39	Hannah Jandra Delotavo; La Salle	24.70	Shane Joy Ponce; FEU	24.99
400m	Lea Kriszeda Ordinario; La Salle	56.62	Hannah Jandra Delotavo; La Salle	56.98	Jessa Belinario; UST	57.04
800m	Susan Ramadan; FEU	2:12.25	Mary Jane Pagayon; UP	2:14.10	Jash Ligan Duhaylungsod; Adamson	2:14.46
1500m	Susan Ramadan; FEU	4:53.37	Jessa Mae Roda; NU	4:53.53	Nicole Kurt Anne Diloy; FEU	4:53.61
5000m	Edna Magtubo; FEU	17:59.13 CR	Jessa Mae Roda; NU	17:59.50	Nicole Kurt Anne Diloy; FEU	18:03.01
10000m	Edna Magtubo; FEU	38:10.98	Mary Jane Pagayon; UP	39:42.55	Asia Paraase; UST	39:57.01
100m hurdles	Jecel Vivas; FEU	14.39	Lyka Miravalles; UST	14.66	Abcd Agamancos; La Salle	14.68
400m hurdles	Jecel Vivas; FEU	1:01.19	Marilou Caduyac; FEU	1:03.67	Hannah Jandra Delotavo; La Salle	1:04.28
3000m steeplechase	Jessa Mae Roda; NU	10:52.56 CR	Edna Magtubo; FEU	11:14.39	Nicole Kurt Anne Diloy; FEU	11:27.88
3000m walk	Azeneth Serat; UST	14:45.44 CR	Juliana Talaro; UP	15:13.07 SR	Mary Julianne Bayolalla; UP	15:58.99
5000m walk	Azeneth Serat; UST	26:04.63 CR	Juliana Talaro; UP	27:44.80	Mary Julianne Bayola; UP	29:21.33
4 × 100m relay	La Salle; Trexie Dela Torre; Hannah Jandra Delotavo; Erica Marie Ruto; Abcd Agamanos	46.73 CR	UST; Iza Lorraine Pangilinan; Mailene Pamisaran; Lyka Miravalles; Lianne Diana Pama	46.87	FEU; Diane Shyr Taranza; Annie Rose Mercurio; Jecel Vivas; Shane Joy Ponce	47.53
4 × 400m relay	La Salle; Erica Marie Ruto; Hannah Jandra Delotavo; Ashley Mecel Tabad; Lea Kriszeda Ordinario	3:53.09	FEU; Jecel Vivas; Kaye Kayralyn Villanueva; Marilou Caduyac; Susan Ramadan	3:53.23	UE; Jane Marie Gochoco; April Santos; Patricia Lobos; Janice Nemi	3:59.83
High jump	Mariel Abuan; UE	1.68 m	Jeanne Arnibal; UST	1.60 m	Evangeline Caminong; NU	1.55 m
Pole vault	Ma. Khrizzie Clarisse Ruzol; UST	3.15 m	Isabella Louise Sta. Maria; UP	3.10 m	Beatriz Palaez; UE	2.60 m
Long jump	Rica Mae Balderama; FEU	5.86 m	Diana Rysiamie Huraño; Adamson	5.65 m	Abcd Agamancos; La Salle	5.56 m
Triple jump	Abcd Agamancos; La Salle	12.41 m	Rea Christine Rafanan; La Salle	12.08 m	Jeanne Arnibal; UST	12.08 m
Shot put	Louise Victoria Manangan; UE	12.44 m	Emma Bolden; UE	12.24 m	Rhealyn De Costa; FEU	11.57 m
Discus throw	Chrizzel Lanipa; UP	44.33 m	Rhealyn De Costa; FEU	43.60 m	Keisha Gabrielle Tolin; Adamson	42.15 m
Javelin throw	Ana Bhianca Espenilla; FEU	48.00 m	Chrizzel Lanipa; UP	38.08 m	Janice Nemi; UE	37.18 m
Hammer throw	Keisha Gabrielle Tolin; Adamson	42.86 m	Jazen Araño; UE	42.69 m	Emma Bolden; UE	42.25 m
Heptathlon	Abcd Agamancos; La Salle	4432	Rea Christine Rafanan; La Salle	4175	Antonette Jay Aguillon; FEU	4013
WR world record | AR area record | CR championship record | GR games record | NR national record | OR Olympic record | PB personal best | SB season best | WL world leading (in a given season)

==== Mixed ====
Event	Gold		Silver		Bronze	
4 × 400m relay	NU; Larry Taripe Jr. May Tobongbanua; John Masuhol; Sharlainne Saguid	3:41.46	Adamson; Edgar Jan Carado; Christine Guergio; John Mark Martir; Jash Ligan Duhaylungsod	3:43.32	UE; Zachary Gabriel Ganacias; Jyzel Mae Gabriel; Rico Lubiano; Janice Nemi	3:19.40
WR world record | AR area record | CR championship record | GR games record | NR national record | OR Olympic record | PB personal best | SB season best | WL world leading (in a given season)

=== Records ===
The following UAAP records were set during the competition:

=== Collegiate records ===
Round	Event	Time/Mark	Name	University
Final	Women's 5000m race walk	26:04.63	Azaneth Serat	UST
Heats	Men's 800m	1:51.76	Hussein Loraña	Ateneo
Final	Women's 5000m	17:59.13	Edna Magtubo	FEU
Final	Men's Long Jump	7.44 m	Joshua Patorara	La Salle
Final	Men's 10000m race walk	45:12.61	Vianmar Dela Cruz	UE
Final	Women's 3000m race walk	14:45.54	Azaneth Serat	UST
Final	Men's triple jump	15.42 m	Rainer Sobrepeña	UP
Final	Men's 5000m race walk	21:17.04	Carlos De Imus	FEU
Final	Men's 4 × 100m relay	41.58	Pacifico Tolentino IV; Joseph Antiola III; Joshua Bercasio; Andreas Womack	FEU
Final	Women's 4 × 100m relay	46.73	Trexie Dela Torre; Hannah Jandra Delotavo; Erica Marie Ruto; Abcd Agamanos	La Salle
Final	Men's discus throw	52.62 m	Russel Ricaforte	Ateneo
Final	Women's 3000m steeplechase	10:52.56	Jessa Mae Roda	NU

=== High school records ===
Round	Event	Time/Mark	Name	Nation
Final	Boys' 5000m race walk	23:55.35	Abdul Saud	Adamson
Final	Girls' 2000m race walk	10:03.19	Sep Placido	UE
Final	Boys' hammer throw	43.22 m	Jayvee Ceballos	UST
Final	Boys' triple jump	14.78 m	Efosa Aguinaldo	NUNS
Final	Girls' 100m	11.97	Franceine Jhobie Rosario	UST
Final	Boys' pole vault	4.15 m (surpassed)	Kent Ebron	Adamson
Final	Mixed 4 × 400m relay (HS)	3:30.93	Ivan Cabanda; Fiona Pilaspilas; Novie Masangcap; Liana Ascan	UST
Final	Girls' heptathlon	3739	Lhynette Libranda	UST
Final	Girls' 200m	24.77	Franceine Jhobie Rosario	UST
Final	Boys' long jump	7.20 m	Efosa Aguinaldo	NUNS
Final	Boys' discus throw	46.52 m	Josh Salcedo	UE
Final	Boys' discus throw	46.52 m	Josh Salcedo	UE
Final	Boys' 1500m	4:00.10	Anthony Cariaso	UE
Final	Boys' 3000m race walk	13:36.48	Rain Mabellin	NUNS
Final	Boys' 4 × 100m relay	46.73	Michael Sunico; Prince Cuyos; Charles Alcantara; Jyndan Lumantas	UST
Final	Boys' 5000m	13:36.48	Jerico Cadag	NUNS
Final	Girls' 5000m race walk	26:39.78	Sep Placido	UE
Final	Boys' 400m Hurdles	52.99	Ivan Cabanda	UST
Final	Girls' 100m Hurdles	14.85	Lhynette Libranda	UST
Final	Boys' 3000m steeplechase	9:38.03	Jerico Cadag	NUNS
Final	Boys' shot put	14.47 m	Arsenio Quinlob	UE
Final	Boys' 4 × 400m relay	3:20.24	Ivan Cabanda; Novie Masangcap; Jyndan Lumantas; Michael Sunico	UST
Final	Boys' pole vault (via decathlon)	4.20 m	John Philip Villar	Adamson

== Swimming ==
Pos.	Pts.
1st	15
2nd	12
3rd	10
4th	8
5th	6
6th	4
7th	2
8th	1

The UAAP swimming championships were held from November 6–9, 2025 at the New Clark City Aquatic Center in Capas, Tarlac.

Ranking is determined by a point system, similar to that of the overall championship. The points given are based on the swimmer's/team's finish in the finals of an event, which include only the top eight finishers from the preliminaries. The gold medalist(s) receive 15 points, silver gets 12, bronze has 10. The following points: 8, 6, 4, 2 and 1 are given to the rest of the participating swimmers/teams according to their order of finish.

=== Men's tournament ===
==== Team standings ====
Rank	Team	Medals				Points
Rank	Team	1st place, gold medalist(s)	2nd place, silver medalist(s)	3rd place, bronze medalist(s)	Total	Points
1st place, gold medalist(s)	Ateneo Blue Eagles (H)	0	0	0	0	471
2nd place, silver medalist(s)	De La Salle Green Tankers	0	0	0	0	294
3rd place, bronze medalist(s)	UST Male Tigersharks	0	0	0	0	224
4	UP Fighting Maroons	0	0	0	0	214

===== Awards =====
- Most Valuable Player: Miguel Barreto (Ateneo Blue Eagles)
- Rookie of the Year: TJ Amaro (Ateneo Blue Eagles)

=== Women's tournament ===
==== Team standings ====
Rank	Team	Medals				Points
Rank	Team	1st place, gold medalist(s)	2nd place, silver medalist(s)	3rd place, bronze medalist(s)	Total	Points
1st place, gold medalist(s)	UP Fighting Maroons	0	0	0	0	472
2nd place, silver medalist(s)	Ateneo Blue Eagles (H)	0	0	0	0	255
3rd place, bronze medalist(s)	De La Salle Lady Tankers	0	0	0	0	222
4	UST Female Tigersharks	0	0	0	0	204

===== Awards =====
- Most Valuable Player: Mishka Sy (Ateneo Blue Eagles)
- Rookie of the Year: Aubrey Tom (UP Fighting Maroons)

=== Boys' tournament ===
==== Team standings ====
Rank	Team	Medals				Points
Rank	Team	1st place, gold medalist(s)	2nd place, silver medalist(s)	3rd place, bronze medalist(s)	Total	Points
1st place, gold medalist(s)	UST Junior Male Tigersharks	0	0	0	0	630
2nd place, silver medalist(s)	Ateneo Blue Eagles (H)	0	0	0	0	315
3rd place, bronze medalist(s)	DLSZ Junior Green Tankers	0	0	0	0	143
4	UPIS Junior Fighting Maroons	0	0	0	0	100
5	Southridge Admirals (G)	0	0	0	0	28

==== Awards ====
- Most Valuable Player: Aishel Evangelista (UST Junior Male Tigersharks)

=== Girls' tournament ===
==== Team standings ====
Rank	Team	Medals				Points
Rank	Team	1st place, gold medalist(s)	2nd place, silver medalist(s)	3rd place, bronze medalist(s)	Total	Points
1st place, gold medalist(s)	UST Junior Female Tigersharks	0	0	0	0	580
2nd place, silver medalist(s)	Ateneo Blue Eagles (H)	0	0	0	0	265
3rd place, bronze medalist(s)	UPIS Junior Fighting Maroons	0	0	0	0	165
4	DLSZ Junior Lady Tankers	0	0	0	0	143

==== Awards ====
- Most Valuable Player: Pam Santos (UST Junior Female Tigersharks)
- Rookie of the Year: Aica Sy (UST Junior Female Tigersharks)

== Table tennis ==
The UAAP table tennis championships began on November 15, 2025. The tournament venue is the Amoranto Sports Complex in Quezon City.

=== Men's tournament ===
==== Elimination round ====
Pos	Team	Pld	W	L	Qualification
1	UST Tiger Paddlers	12	12	0	Advance to the Finals (Note: As UST won all of their elimination round games, the stepladder format was used instead of the regular Final Four format.)
2	Ateneo Blue Eagles	12	9	3	Advance to stepladder semifinal
3	Adamson Soaring Falcons	12	6	6	Proceed to stepladder quarterfinal
4	FEU Tamaraws	12	5 (Note: Playoff stage 1: FEU 3–1 UP; playoff stage 2: FEU 3–2 La Salle)	7	Proceed to stepladder quarterfinal
5	De La Salle Green Paddlers	12	5	7	
6	UP Fighting Maroons (H)	12	5	7	
7	UE Red Warriors	12	0	12	

Source: The UAAP
Rules for classification: 1) winning percentage; 2) if tied for #2 or #4, one-game playoff; 3) head-to-head record; 4) head-to-head point differential; 5) overall point differential
(H) Hosts

==== Fourth seed playoffs ====
Playoff stage 1 (Single-elimination)		Playoff stage 2 (Single-elimination)
		La Salle	2
FEU	3	FEU	3
UP	1

===== Playoff stage 1 =====
November 20; 8:00 AM	FEU Tamaraws	3–1	UP Fighting Maroons	Amoranto Sports Complex

Report	Individual matches
Dane Dunstan Piala	1–3	Luis Gabriel De Asis	7–11, 12–10, 6–11, 7–11
Christian Golez	3–1	Gabriel Ken Nieva	11–9, 12–10, 9–11, 11–9
Claer Henson Riego / Louis Aaron Sacay	3–2	Mark Manuel Llamas / Benzdio Aniluv Florida	10–12, 8–11, 12–10, 12–10, 11–9
Peter Shean Cubio	3–2	Dirk Odian II	12–10, 8–11, 17–19, 15–13, 11–6

===== Playoff stage 2 =====
November 20; 10:30 AM	De La Salle Green Paddlers	2–3	FEU Tamaraws	Amoranto Sports Complex

Report	Individual matches
Dino Gabriel Marcelo	0–3	Peter Shean Cubio	8–11, 6–11, 6–11
Red Morison Torres	2–3	Christian Golez	6–11, 8–11, 11–5, 15–13, 6–11
Joseph Noriega / Peter Angelo Zambrano	3–1	Claer Henson Riego / Louis Aaron Sacay	11–4, 11–8, 10–12, 11–8
Reyan Andrian Reg	3–0	Dane Dunstan Piala	11–6, 11–5, 11–6
Andrei Keiron Villacruel	0–3	Arsenio Renz De Guzman	4–11, 10–12, 8–11

==== Bracket ====
Stepladder quarterfinal (Single-elimination)
November 20
3	Adamson	0
4	FEU	3

Stepladder semifinal (Single-elimination)
November 20
2	Ateneo	3
4	FEU	2

Finals (Best-of-three playoff)
November 21
1	UST	3	3
2	Ateneo	2	2

===== Stepladder quarterfinal =====
November 20; 1:30 PM	Adamson Soaring Falcons	0–3	FEU Tamaraws	Amoranto Sports Complex

Report	Individual matches
Amiel John Aroma	0–3	Peter Shean Cubio	9–11, 5–11, 8–11
Manuel Jr. Apura	1–3	Christian Golez	6–11, 7–11, 11–5, 5–11
Jhon Brylle Balucos / Aldrean Gacho	1–3	Louis Aaron Sacay / Claer Henson Riego	12–10, 8–11, 9–11, 5–11

===== Stepladder semifinal =====
November 20; 4:00 PM	Ateneo Blue Eagles	3–2	FEU Tamaraws	Amoranto Sports Complex

Report	Individual matches
Mahendra Mahaviira Cabrido	1–3	Peter Shean Cubio	7–11, 8–11, 11–6, 9–11
Rod Andree Garcia	3–1	Christian Golez	11–9, 4–11, 11–8, 12–10
Carlos Gabriel Docto / Emmanuel Chris Josh Yamson	3–0	Claer Henson Riego / Louis Aaron Sacay	11–4, 12–10, 11–8
Andrew Uy	0–3	Arsenio Renz De Guzman	5–11, 9–11, 7–11
Wrency Abad	3–0	Dane Dunstan Piala	11–8, 11–4, 11–6

===== Finals =====
====== Game 1 ======
November 21; 8:00 AM	UST Tiger Paddlers	3–2	Ateneo Blue Eagles	Amoranto Sports Complex

Report	Individual matches
Ray Joshua Lawrence Manlapaz	3–0	Emmanuel Chris Josh Yamson	13–11, 11–6, 11–9
Eljey Dan Tormis	1–3	Mahendra Mahaviira Cabrido	5–11, 11–5, 7–11, 8–11
Ruiz Arch Marcelino / Al J Sanchez	1–3	Wrency Abad / Zherdel Drozle Fresco	11–8, 7–11, 7–11, 5–11
Gerald Aguilar	3–1	Rod Andree Garcia	11–5, 12–10, 5–11, 11–7
Abraham Paul Antivo	3–0	Andrew Uy	11–5, 11–6, 12–10

====== Game 2 ======
November 21; 10:30 AM	UST Tiger Paddlers	3–2	Ateneo Blue Eagles	Amoranto Sports Complex

Report	Individual matches
Eljey Dan Tormis	3–1	Zherdel Drozle Fresco	9–11, 11–7, 11–8, 11–5
Ray Joshua Lawrence Manlapaz	1–3	Mahendra Mahaviira Cabrido	8–11, 7–11, 12–10, 10–12
Prince Karl Garcia / Ruiz Arc Marcelino	0–3	Carlos Gabriel Docto / Emmanuel Chris Josh Yamson	8–11, 8–11, 8–11
Abraham Paul Antivo	3–2	Wrency Abad	11–7, 6–11, 11–9, 7–11, 11–9
Gerald Aguilar	3–1	Rod Andree Garcia	7–11, 11–6, 11–6, 11–6

==== Awards ====
- Most Valuable Player: Abraham Paul Antivo (UST Tiger Paddlers)
- Rookie of the Year: Gerald Aguilar (UST Tiger Paddlers)

=== Women's tournament ===
==== Elimination round ====
Pos	Team	Pld	W	L	Qualification
1	FEU Lady Tamaraws	12	12	0	Advance to the Finals (Note: As FEU won all of their elimination round games, the stepladder format was used instead of the regular Final Four format.)
2	UST Lady Paddlers	12	10	2	Advance to stepladder semifinal
3	De La Salle Lady Paddlers	12	8	4	Proceed to stepladder quarterfinal
4	Ateneo Blue Eagles	12	6	6	Proceed to stepladder quarterfinal
5	UE Lady Warriors	12	3	9	
6	UP Fighting Maroons (H)	12	2	10	
7	Adamson Lady Falcons	12	1	11	

Rules for classification: 1) winning percentage; 2) if tied for #2 or #4, one-game playoff; 3) head-to-head record; 4) head-to-head point differential; 5) overall point differential
(H) Hosts

==== Bracket ====
Stepladder quarterfinal (Single-elimination)
November 20
3	La Salle	3
4	Ateneo	1

Stepladder semifinal (Single-elimination)
November 20
2	UST	3
3	La Salle	2

Finals (Best-of-three playoff)
November 21
1	FEU	3	3
2	UST	2	0

===== Stepladder quarterfinal =====
November 20; 1:30 PM	DLSU Lady Paddlers	3–1	Ateneo Blue Eagles	Amoranto Sports Complex

Report	Individual matches
Lillian Margaret Ebora	3–1	Jelaine Monteclaro	12–10, 5–11, 11–7, 11–9
Angelou Joyce Laude	3–0	Ma. Elira Therese Carleen Docto	11–1, 11–4, 11–8
Mariana Cello Caoile / Sharina Casandra Mendoza	1–3	Nicole Alemania / Anna Sophia Fabregar	5–11, 12–10, 8–11, 9–11
Kyla Cielo Bernaldez	3–0	Andrea Deondo	11–4, 11–7, 11–5

===== Stepladder semifinal =====
November 20; 4:00 PM	UST Lady Paddlers	3–2	De La Salle Green Archers	Amoranto Sports Complex

Report	Individual matches
Kaye Alliah Encarnacion	3–0	Kyla Cielo Bernaldez	11–7, 17–15, 11–9
Janna Mae Paculba	0–3	Angelou Joyce Laude	5–11, 8–11, 2–11
Jaylyn Valencia / Samantha Bandojo	2–3	Mariana Cello Caoile / Sharina Casandra Mendoza	7–11, 11–7, 2–11, 11–7, 7–11
Althea Jade Gudes	3–0	Lillian Margaret Ebora	11–6, 11–8, 11–8
Keya Katrice Manada	3–1	Shyrein Mae Redoquerio	13–15, 11–7, 11–5, 11–6

===== Finals =====
====== Game 1 ======
November 21; 8:00 AM	FEU Lady Tamaraws	3–2	UST Lady Paddlers	Amoranto Sports Complex

Report	Individual matches
Cate Jazstyne Sarmiento	2–3	Kaye Alliah Encarnacion	2–11, 11–9, 7–11, 11–4, 9–11
Chrishien Mae Santillan	3–0	Keya Katrice Manada	16–14, 11–5, 11–2
Glieza Gwyn Ampalid / Krisha Ilm Reyes	3–0	Samantha Bandojo / Jaylyn Valencia	11–7, 11–5, 11–3
Shairah Gabisay	2–3	Althea Jade Gudes	7–11, 8–11, 11–9, 11–7, 3–11
Christine Golez	3–1	Janna Mae Paculba	11–4, 11–6, 15–17, 11–9

====== Game 2 ======
November 21; 10:30 AM	FEU Lady Tamaraws	3–0	UST Lady Paddlers	Amoranto Sports Complex

Report	Individual matches
Shairah Gabisay	3–0	Kaye Alliah Encarnacion	12–10, 11–1, 11–3
Chrishien Mae Santillan	3–0	Janna Mae Paculba	11–4, 11–7, 11–5
Glieza Gwyn Ampalid / Krisha Ilm Reyes	3–0	Samantha Bandojo / Leigh Erika Villanueva	11–4, 11–6, 11–9

==== Awards ====
- Most Valuable Player: Chrishien Mae Santillan (FEU Lady Tamaraws)
- Rookie of the Year: Christine Golez (FEU Lady Tamaraws)

=== Boys' tournament ===
==== Elimination round ====
Pos	Team	Pld	W	L	Qualification
1	UST Junior Tiger Paddlers	10	10	0	Advance to the Finals (Note: As UST won all of their elimination round games, the stepladder format was used instead of the regular Final Four format.)
2	Adamson Baby Falcons	10	8	2	Advance to stepladder semifinal
3	UE Junior Red Warriors	10	6	4	Proceed to stepladder quarterfinal
4	DLSZ Junior Green Paddlers	10	4	6	Proceed to stepladder quarterfinal
5	Ateneo Blue Eagles	10	2	8	
6	UPIS Junior Fighting Maroons (H)	10	0	10	

Source: The UAAP
Rules for classification: 1) winning percentage; 2) if tied for #2 or #4, one-game playoff; 3) head-to-head record; 4) head-to-head point differential; 5) overall point differential
(H) Hosts

==== Bracket ====
Stepladder quarterfinal (Single-elimination)
November 20
3	UE	3
4	La Salle	2

Stepladder semifinal (Single-elimination)
November 20
2	Adamson	3
3	UE	2

Finals (Best-of-three playoff)
November 21
1	UST	3	3
2	Adamson	0	0

==== Awards ====
- Most Valuable Player: Emmanuel Paculba Jr. (UST Junior Tiger Paddlers)
- Rookie of the Year: Joshua Bañas (UST Junior Tiger Paddlers)

=== Girls' tournament ===
==== Elimination round ====
Pos	Team	Pld	W	L	Qualification
1	UST Junior Lady Paddlers	10	10	0	Advance to the Finals (Note: As UST won all of their elimination round games, the stepladder format was used instead of the regular Final Four format.)
2	UE Junior Lady Warriors	10	8	2	Advance to stepladder semifinal
3	DLSZ Junior Lady Paddlers	10	6	4	Proceed to stepladder quarterfinal
4	Adamson Lady Baby Falcons	10	4	6	Proceed to stepladder quarterfinal
5	UP Fighting Maroons (H)	10	2	8	
6	Ateneo Blue Eagles	10	0	10	

Rules for classification: 1) winning percentage; 2) if tied for #2 or #4, one-game playoff; 3) head-to-head record; 4) head-to-head point differential; 5) overall point differential
(H) Hosts

==== Bracket ====
Stepladder quarterfinal (Single-elimination)
November 20
3	La Salle	3
4	Adamson	1

Stepladder semifinal (Single-elimination)
November 20
2	UE	1
3	La Salle	3

Finals (Best-of-three playoff)
November 21
1	UST	3	3
3	La Salle	0	1

==== Awards ====
- Most Valuable Player: Kaira Agreda (UST Junior Lady Paddlers)
- Rookie of the Year: Sari Velasco (DLSZ Junior Lady Paddlers)

== Beach volleyball ==
The UAAP beach volleyball championships were held on November 21–30 for the collegiate tournaments and February 13–22 for the high school tournament. The Sands at SM by the Bay in Pasay was the venue of the tournament.

=== Men's tournament ===
==== Elimination round ====
===== Team standings =====
Pos	Team	Pld	W	L	Pts	Qualification
1	UST Tiger Sands	7	7	0	14	Qualification for semifinals
2	NU Bulldogs (H)	7	6	1	13	Qualification for semifinals
3	FEU Tamaraws	7	4 (Note: Head-to-head record: FEU 1–0 Ateneo (2–1))	3	11	Qualification for semifinals
4	Ateneo Blue Eagles	7	4	3	11	Qualification for semifinals
5	Adamson Soaring Falcons	7	3	4	10	
6	UP Fighting Maroons	7	2 (Note: Head-to-head record: UP 1–0 La Salle (2–1))	5	9	
7	De La Salle Green Spikers	7	2	5	9	
8	UE Red Warriors	7	0	7	7	

Source: The UAAP
Rules for classification: 1) winning percentage; 2) if tied for #2 or #4, one-game playoff; 3) head-to-head record; 4) match points; 5) sets ratio; 6) points ratio
(H) Host

==== Bracket ====
Semifinals (Single-elimination)
November 30
1	UST	2
4	Ateneo	0
November 30
2	NU	2
3	FEU	0

Finals (Single-elimination)
November 30
1	UST	2
2	NU	0
Third place (Single-elimination)
November 30
4	Ateneo	2
3	FEU	0

==== Semifinals ====
30 November 2025; 08:45	Gupiteo – Gabito	2–0	Salarzon – Pacinio	Sands at SM by the Bay, Pasay City
30 November 2025; 08:45	(21–18, 21–14); Report			Sands at SM by the Bay, Pasay City

30 November 2025; 09:30	Iraya – Gemarino	2–0	Salboro – Postorioso	Sands at SM by the Bay, Pasay City
30 November 2025; 09:30	(21–14, 21–12); Report			Sands at SM by the Bay, Pasay City

==== Third place playoff ====
30 November 2025; 14:00	Salboro – Postorioso	0–2	Salarzon – Pacinio	Sands at SM by the Bay, Pasay City
30 November 2025; 14:00	(16–21, 11–21); Report			Sands at SM by the Bay, Pasay City

==== Finals ====
30 November 2025; 15:30	Gupiteo – Gabito	2–0	Iraya – Gemarino	Sands at SM by the Bay, Pasay City
30 November 2025; 15:30	(24–22, 21–17); Report			Sands at SM by the Bay, Pasay City

==== Awards ====
- Most Valuable Player: Alche Gupiteo (UST Tiger Sands)
- Rookie of the Year: Christian Solboro (FEU Tamaraws)

=== Women's tournament ===
==== Elimination round ====
===== Team standings =====
Pos	Team	Pld	W	L	Pts	Qualification
1	UST Tiger Sands	7	7	0	14	Qualification for semifinals
2	NU Lady Bulldogs (H)	7	6	1	13	Qualification for semifinals
3	FEU Lady Tamaraws	7	5	2	12	Qualification for semifinals
4	UP Fighting Maroons	7	4	3	11	Qualification for semifinals
5	Ateneo Blue Eagles	7	3	4	10	
6	Adamson Lady Falcons	7	2	5	9	
7	De La Salle Lady Spikers	7	1	6	8	
8	UE Lady Warriors	7	0	7	7	

Source: The UAAP
Rules for classification: 1) winning percentage; 2) if tied for #2 or #4, one-game playoff; 3) head-to-head record; 4) match points; 5) sets ratio; 6) points ratio
(H) Host

==== Bracket ====
Semifinals (Single-elimination)
November 30
1	UST	2
4	UP	0
November 30
2	NU	2
3	FEU	1

Finals (Single-elimination)
November 30
1	UST	2
2	NU	0
Third place (Single-elimination)
November 30
4	UP	1
3	FEU	2

==== Semifinals ====
30 November 2025; 10:15	Pagara – Progella	2–0	Gayo – Ornos	Sands at SM by the Bay, Pasay City
30 November 2025; 10:15	(21–10, 21–10); Report			Sands at SM by the Bay, Pasay City

30 November 2025; 11:00	Cordero – Epa	2–1	Pons – Lopez	Sands at SM by the Bay, Pasay City
30 November 2025; 11:00	(21–18, 16–21, 23–21); Report			Sands at SM by the Bay, Pasay City

==== Third place playoff ====
30 November 2025; 14:45	Pons – Lopez	2–1	Gayo – Ornos	Sands at SM by the Bay, Pasay City
30 November 2025; 14:45	(21–18, 15–21, 15–4); Report			Sands at SM by the Bay, Pasay City

==== Finals ====
30 November 2025; 16:15	Pagara – Progella	2–0	Cordero – Quijote	Sands at SM by the Bay, Pasay City
30 November 2025; 16:15	(21–8, 22–20); Report			Sands at SM by the Bay, Pasay City

==== Awards ====
- Most Valuable Player: Khylem Progella (UST Tiger Sands)
- Rookie of the Year: Kristine Smile Iquio (UE Lady Warriors)

=== Boys' tournament ===
==== Elimination round ====
===== Team standings =====
Pos	Team	Pld	W	L	Pts	Qualification
1	NUNS Bullpups (H)	7	7	0	14	Qualification for semifinals
2	UST Junior Tiger Sands	7	6	1	13	Qualification for semifinals
3	Adamson Baby Falcons	7	5	2	12	Qualification for semifinals
4	UE Junior Red Warriors	7	4	3	11	Qualification for semifinals
5	FEU–D Baby Tamaraws	7	3	4	10	
6	UPIS Junior Fighting Maroons	7	2	5	9	
7	DLSZ Junior Green Spikers	7	1	6	8	
8	Ateneo Blue Eagles	7	0	7	7	

Source: The UAAP
Rules for classification: 1) winning percentage; 2) if tied for #2 or #4, one-game playoff; 3) head-to-head record; 4) match points; 5) sets ratio; 6) points ratio
(H) Host

==== Bracket ====
Semifinals (Single-elimination)
February 22
1	NUNS	2
4	UE	0
February 22
2	UST	2
3	Adamson	0

Finals (Single-elimination)
February 22
1	NUNS	0
2	UST	2
Third place (Single-elimination)
February 22
4	UE	2
3	Adamson	1

==== Awards ====
- Most Valuable Player: Karl Escobal (UST Junior Tiger Sands)
- Rookie of the Year: Prince Jimenez (UPIS Junior Fighting Maroons)

=== Girls' tournament ===
==== Elimination round ====
===== Team standings =====
Pos	Team	Pld	W	L	Pts	Qualification
1	UST Junior Tiger Sands	7	7	0	14	Qualification for semifinals
2	Adamson Lady Baby Falcons	7	6	1	13	Qualification for semifinals
3	NUNS Lady Bullpups (H)	7	5	2	12	Qualification for semifinals
4	FEU–D Lady Baby Tamaraws	7	4	3	11	Qualification for semifinals
5	DLSZ Junior Lady Spikers	7	3	4	10	
6	UPIS Junior Fighting Maroons	7	2	5	9	
7	Ateneo Blue Eagles	7	1	6	8	
8	UE Junior Lady Warriors	7	0	7	7	

Source: The UAAP
Rules for classification: 1) winning percentage; 2) if tied for #2 or #4, one-game playoff; 3) head-to-head record; 4) match points; 5) sets ratio; 6) points ratio
(H) Host

==== Bracket ====
Semifinals (Single-elimination)
February 22
1	UST	2
4	FEU–D	0
February 22
2	Adamson	2
3	NUNS	0

Finals (Single-elimination)
February 22
1	UST	2
2	Adamson	1
Third place (Single-elimination)
February 22
4	FEU–D	0
3	NUNS	2

==== Awards ====
- Most Valuable Player: Cheng Dadang (UST Junior Tiger Sands)

== Baseball ==
The UAAP baseball championships commenced on January 7 with the return of the high school boys' tournament.

=== Men's tournament ===
==== Elimination round ====
Pos	Team	Pld	W	L	RF	RA	RD	PCT	Qualification
1	De La Salle Green Batters	10	7	3	111	83	+28	.700	Twice-to-beat in the semifinals
2	NU Bulldogs	10	8	2	87	35	+52	.800	Twice-to-beat in the semifinals
3	Adamson Soaring Falcons (H)	10	4	6	98	104	−6	.400 (Note: Head-to-head record: AdU 3–1, UP 2–2, UST 1–3; fourth-seed playoff: UP 8–7 UST)	Twice-to-win in the semifinals
4	UP Fighting Maroons	10	4	6	92	86	+6	.400	Twice-to-win in the semifinals
5	UST Golden Sox	10	4	6	67	92	−25	.400	
6	Ateneo Blue Eagles	10	3	7	83	137	−54	.300	

Rules for classification: 1) winning percentage; 2) if tied for #2 or #4, one-game playoff; 3) head-to-head record; 4) head-to-head runs against; 5) overall run differential
(H) Hosts

===== Match-up results =====
	Round 1					Round 2				
Team ╲ Game	1	2	3	4	5	6	7	8	9	10
Adamson	UST school colors	Ateneo school colors	NU school colors	La Salle school colors	UP school colors	Ateneo school colors	UST school colors	NU school colors	La Salle school colors	UP school colors
Ateneo	NU school colors	Adamson school colors	La Salle school colors	UST school colors	UP school colors	Adamson school colors	La Salle school colors	UP school colors	NU school colors	UST school colors
La Salle	UP school colors	UST school colors	Ateneo school colors	Adamson school colors	NU school colors	UP school colors	Ateneo school colors	UST school colors	Adamson school colors	NU school colors
NU	Ateneo school colors	UP school colors	Adamson school colors	UST school colors	La Salle school colors	UST school colors	UP school colors	Adamson school colors	Ateneo school colors	La Salle school colors
UP	La Salle school colors	NU school colors	UST school colors	Adamson school colors	Ateneo school colors	La Salle school colors	NU school colors	Ateneo school colors	UST school colors	Adamson school colors
UST	Adamson school colors	La Salle school colors	UP school colors	NU school colors	Ateneo school colors	NU school colors	Adamson school colors	La Salle school colors	UP school colors	Ateneo school colors

Updated to match(es) played on March 17, 2026. Source:
= Win; = Extra innings win; = Win by mercy rule; = Loss; = Loss by mercy rule; = Extra innings loss

===== Scores =====
Results to the right and top of the gray cells are first round games, those to the left and below are second round games.

Teams	AdU	ATENEO	DLSU	NU	UP	UST
Adamson Soaring Falcons	—	14–18	12–15^{10}	5–13	14–5	7–6
Ateneo Blue Eagles	1–13	—	5–23^{5}	4–9	17–12	10–9
De La Salle Green Batters	13–12^{11}	18–15	—	4–14^{8}	6–5	6–10
NU Bulldogs	10–4	8–1	10–5	—	13–2	3–1
UP Fighting Maroons	17–5^{7}	15–4	0–11^{7}	4–3	—	24–7^{6}
UST Golden Sox	6–12	16–8	0–10^{7}	5–4	8–7	—

Legend: Blue = left column team win; Red = top row team win.

Superscript is the number of innings played before the mercy rule was applied or the final number of innings following extra innings.

==== Fourth seed playoff ====
April 8, 2026 7:00 AM at Rizal Memorial Baseball Stadium
Team	1	2	3	4	5	6	7	8	9	R	H	E
UST Golden Sox	2	0	0	0	2	0	2	0	1	7	8	3
UP Fighting Maroons	5	0	0	1	0	0	1	1	X	8	11	0

==== Playoffs ====
Semifinals (Nos. 1 & 2 have twice-to-beat advantage)
1	NU	7
4	UP	4
2	La Salle	7
3	Adamson	5

Finals (Best-of-three series)
1	NU	1	9	7
2	La Salle	2	3	6

===== Semifinals =====
====== (1) NU vs. (4) UP ======
April 11, 2026 7:00 AM at Rizal Memorial Baseball Stadium
Team	1	2	3	4	5	6	7	8	9	R	H	E
UP Fighting Maroons	0	0	2	0	0	0	1	0	1	4	9	4
NU Bulldogs	0	0	0	0	3	1	3	0	X	7	8	2

====== (2) La Salle vs. (3) Adamson ======
April 8, 2026 11:00 AM at Rizal Memorial Baseball Stadium
Team	1	2	3	4	5	6	7	8	9	R	H	E
AdU Soaring Falcons	0	0	3	0	2	0	0	0	0	5	8	4
DLSU Green Batters	0	2	0	2	0	0	0	3	X	7	6	3

===== Finals =====
====== Game 1 ======
April 14, 2026 8:00 AM at Rizal Memorial Baseball Stadium
Team	1	2	3	4	5	6	7	8	9	R	H	E
DLSU Green Batters	1	0	1	0	0	0	0	0	0	2	6	2
NU Bulldogs	0	0	0	0	0	0	1	0	0	1	4	2

====== Game 2 ======
April 17, 2026 8:00 AM at Rizal Memorial Baseball Stadium
Team	1	2	3	4	5	6	7	8	9	R	H	E
NU Bulldogs	2	1	0	0	2	3	0	0	1	9	11	4
DLSU Green Batters	0	0	0	0	1	0	2	0	0	3	4	3

====== Game 3 ======
April 21, 2026 8:00 AM at Rizal Memorial Baseball Stadium
Team	1	2	3	4	5	6	7	8	9	R	H	E
DLSU Green Batters	0	2	1	0	0	0	1	2	0	6	11	1
NU Bulldogs	0	1	0	0	0	1	3	1	1	7	16	2

==== Awards ====
- Most Valuable Player: Renato Samuel Jr. (DLSU Green Batters)
- Finals Most Valuable Player: Charles Chua (NU Bulldogs)
- Rookie of the Year: Zane Pradez (Ateneo Blue Eagles)
- Best Pitcher: Hilario Espina III (NU Bulldogs) (2.105 ERA)
- Best Hitter: Renato Samuel Jr. (DLSU Green Batters) (.476)
- Best Slugger: Renato Samuel Jr. (DLSU Green Batters) (.906)
- Most Home Runs: Renato Samuel Jr. (DLSU Green Batters) (2 HR)
- Most RBIs: Luis Magsadia (Ateneo Blue Eagles) (16 RBI)
- Most Stolen Bases: Ezykiel Bautista (DLSU Green Batters) (8 SB)

=== Boys' tournament ===
==== Elimination round ====
Pos	Team	Pld	W	L	RF	RA	RD	PCT	Qualification
1	DLSZ Junior Green Batters	8	5	3	39	41	−2	.625 (Note: Head-to-head record: DLSZ 3–1, NUNS 2–2, Southridge 1–3; second-seed playoff: Southridge 6–3 NUNS)	Advance to the Finals
2	Southridge Admirals (G)	8	5	3	39	67	−28	.625	Advance to the Finals
3	NUNS Bullpups	8	5	3	50	27	+23	.625	
4	UST Junior Golden Sox	8	4	4	55	31	+24	.500	
5	Ateneo Blue Eagles	8	1	7	30	47	−17	.125	

Updated to match(es) played on February 16, 2026. Source:
Rules for classification: 1) winning percentage; 2) if tied for #2, one-game playoff; 3) head-to-head record; 4) head-to-head runs against; 5) overall run differential
(G) Guests

===== Match-up results =====
	Round 1				Round 2			
Team ╲ Game	1	2	3	4	5	6	7	8
Ateneo	PAREF school colors	La Salle school colors	NU school colors	UST school colors	La Salle school colors	PAREF school colors	NU school colors	UST school colors
DLSZ	UST school colors	PAREF school colors	Ateneo school colors	NU school colors	Ateneo school colors	UST school colors	PAREF school colors	NU school colors
NUNS	UST school colors	PAREF school colors	Ateneo school colors	La Salle school colors	PAREF school colors	UST school colors	Ateneo school colors	La Salle school colors
Southridge	Ateneo school colors	La Salle school colors	NU school colors	UST school colors	NU school colors	Ateneo school colors	La Salle school colors	UST school colors
UST	La Salle school colors	NU school colors	PAREF school colors	Ateneo school colors	NU school colors	La Salle school colors	Ateneo school colors	PAREF school colors

Updated to match(es) played on February 16, 2026. Source:
= Win; = Extra innings win; = Win by mercy rule; = Loss; = Loss by mercy rule; = Extra innings loss

===== Scores =====
Results to the right and top of the gray cells are first round games, those to the left and below are second round games.

Teams	ATENEO	DLSZ	NUNS	SRG	UST
Ateneo Blue Eagles	—	8–7	4–9	12–13	6–18^{7}
DLSZ Junior Green Batters	14–7	—	9–8	17–7^{7}	6–18^{7}
NUNS Bullpups	11–1^{8}	3–4	—	27–6^{6}	6–8
Southridge Admirals	19–7	7–6	11–12^{10}	—	13–11
UST Junior Golden Sox	12–4	7–12	3–4	7–10	—

Updated to match(es) played on January 21, 2026. Source:
Legend: Blue = left column team win; Red = top row team win.

Superscript is the number of innings played before the mercy rule was applied or the final number of innings following extra innings.

==== Second seed playoff ====
February 18, 2026 8:30 AM at Rizal Memorial Baseball Stadium
Team	1	2	3	4	5	6	7	8	9	R	H	E
Southridge Admirals	1	0	0	0	1	1	1	2	0	6	6	1
NUNS Bullpups	2	0	0	0	0	0	1	0	0	3	10	6

==== Finals ====
Finals (Best-of-three series)
1	DLSZ	2	1
2	Southridge	15	11

===== Game 1 =====
February 21, 2026 8:30 AM at Rizal Memorial Baseball Stadium
Team	1	2	3	4	5	6	7	8	9	R	H	E
Southridge Admirals	1	2	1	0	9	1	1	X	X	15	12	1
DLSZ Junior Green Batters	0	0	0	0	0	2	0	X	X	2	3	8

===== Game 2 =====
February 23, 2026 8:30 AM at Rizal Memorial Baseball Stadium
Team	1	2	3	4	5	6	7	8	9	R	H	E
DLSZ Junior Green Batters	0	0	1	0	0	0	0	0	X	1	3	6
Southridge Admirals	0	0	0	1	1	3	1	5	X	11	10	4

==== Awards ====
- Most Valuable Player: John Denrick Plaza (NUNS Bullpups)
- Finals Most Valuable Player: Amiel Belgar (Southridge Admirals)
- Best Pitcher: Laurence Valeros (DLSZ Junior Green Batters) (4.849 ERA)
- Best Hitter: JC Basañes (Southridge Admirals) (.441)
- Best Slugger: John Denrick Plaza (NUNS Bullpups) (.613)
- Most Home Runs: Aljun Tapia (DLSZ Junior Green Batters) (1 HR)
- Most RBIs: Matt Genota (Southridge Admirals) (11 RBI)
- Most Stolen Bases: Van Ibabao (UST Junior Golden Sox) (16 SB)

== Softball ==
The UAAP softball championships began on February 24 at the Rizal Memorial Baseball Stadium.

=== Women's tournament ===
==== Elimination round ====
Pos	Team	Pld	W	L	RF	RA	RD	Pts	Qualification
1	Adamson Lady Falcons (H)	8	7	1	62	10	+52	15	Advance to the Finals
2	UP Fighting Maroons	8	6	2	51	13	+38	14	Advance to the Finals
3	UST Tiger Softbelles	8	5	3	30	25	+5	13	
4	De La Salle Lady Batters	8	2	6	35	21	+14	10	
5	Ateneo Blue Eagles	8	0	8	6	115	−109	8	

Rules for classification: 1) winning percentage; 2) if tied for #2 or #4, one-game playoff; 3) head-to-head record; 4) head-to-head runs against; 5) overall run differential
(H) Hosts

===== Match-up results =====
	Round 1				Round 2			
Team ╲ Game	1	2	3	4	5	6	7	8
Adamson	UST school colors	Ateneo school colors	UP school colors	La Salle school colors	UP school colors	Ateneo school colors	UST school colors	La Salle school colors
Ateneo	UP school colors	La Salle school colors	Adamson school colors	UST school colors	UST school colors	La Salle school colors	Adamson school colors	UP school colors
La Salle	UST school colors	Ateneo school colors	UP school colors	Adamson school colors	UP school colors	Ateneo school colors	UST school colors	Adamson school colors
UP	Ateneo school colors	La Salle school colors	Adamson school colors	UST school colors	La Salle school colors	Adamson school colors	Ateneo school colors	UST school colors
UST	La Salle school colors	Adamson school colors	Ateneo school colors	UP school colors	Ateneo school colors	La Salle school colors	Adamson school colors	UP school colors

= Win; = Extra innings win; = Win by mercy rule; = Loss; = Loss by mercy rule; = Extra innings loss

===== Scores =====
Teams	AdU	ATENEO	DLSU	UP	UST
Adamson Lady Falcons	—	25–0^{3}	3–1	3–6	4–0
Ateneo Blue Eagles	0–17^{3}	—	0–18^{3}	0–11^{5}	2–7
De La Salle Lady Batters	1–3	11–0^{4}	—	0–4	1–2
UP Fighting Maroons	2–4	16–1^{5}	2–1	—	1–5
UST Tiger Softbelles	0–3	10–3^{5}	7–2	3–5	—

Legend: Blue = left column team win; Red = top row team win.

Results to the right and top of the gray cells are first round games, those to the left and below are second round games. Superscript is the number of innings played before the mercy rule applied.

===== Finals =====
Finals (Best-of-three series)
1	Adamson	5	5
2	UP	0	0

====== Game 1 ======
April 6, 2026 9:00 AM at Rizal Memorial Baseball Stadium
Team	1	2	3	4	5	6	7	R	H	E
UP Fighting Maroons	0	0	0	0	0	0	0	0	3	1
AdU Lady Falcons	0	1	2	0	1	1	X	5	8	0

====== Game 2 ======
April 10, 2026 9:00 AM at Rizal Memorial Baseball Stadium
Team	1	2	3	4	5	6	7	R	H	E
AdU Lady Falcons	2	0	3	0	0	0	0	5	8	0
UP Fighting Maroons	0	0	0	0	0	0	0	0	4	3

==== Awards ====
- Most Valuable Player: Mae Langga (Adamson Lady Falcons)
- Finals Most Valuable Player: Glory Alonzo (Adamson Lady Falcons)
- Rookie of the Year: Anna Macatbag (UST Tiger Softbelles)
- Best Pitcher: Glory Alonzo (Adamson Lady Falcons) (.625 ERA)
- Best Hitter: Mae Langga (Adamson Lady Falcons) (.480)
- Best Slugger: Mae Langga (Adamson Lady Falcons) (1.040)
- Most Home Runs: Mae Langga (Adamson Lady Falcons) (3 HR)
- Most RBIs: Mae Langga (Adamson Lady Falcons) (13 RBI)
- Most Stolen Bases: Cassandra Inot (DLSU Lady Batters) (6 SB)

== Tennis ==
The UAAP tennis championships started on February 14 at the Colegio San Agustin - Bulacan Tennis Stadium in San Jose del Monte, Bulacan. The tournament also featured the debut of the boys' division as a demonstration sport. The boys' division also saw the debut a new competition format, featuring individual singles and doubles events.

=== Men's tournament ===
==== Elimination round ====
Pos	Team	Pld	W	L	Qualification
1	UP Fighting Maroons	12	11	1	Twice-to-beat in the semifinals
2	UST Male Tennisters	12	9 (Note: Second seed playoff: UST 3–2 NU)	3	Twice-to-beat in the semifinals
3	NU Bulldogs	12	9	3	Twice-to-win in the semifinals
4	UE Red Warriors	12	7	5	Twice-to-win in the semifinals
5	De La Salle Green Tennisters	12	4	8	
6	Adamson Soaring Falcons	12	2	10	
7	Ateneo Blue Eagles (H)	12	0	12	

Updated to match(es) played on 15 February 2026. Source: The UAAP
Rules for classification: 1) number of wins; 2) if tied for #2 or #4, one-tie playoff; 3) head-to-head record; 4) match points; 5) matches ratio; 6) games ratio
(H) Hosts

==== Playoffs ====
Semifinals (Nos. 1 & 2 have twice-to-beat advantage)
1	UP	3
4	UE	2
2	UST	0	3
3	NU	3	2

Final (Best-of-three series)
1	UP	0	3	1
2	UST	3	2	3

==== Awards ====
- Most Valuable Player: John Aguilar (UE Red Warriors)
- Rookie of the Year: Carl Tan (UP Fighting Maroons)

=== Women's tournament ===
==== Elimination round ====
Pos	Team	Pld	W	L	Qualification
1	NU Lady Bulldogs	8	6 (Note: Head-to-head: NU 2–0 UP)	2	Advance to the Finals
2	UP Fighting Maroons	8	6	2	Advance to the Finals
3	UST Female Tennisters	8	5	3	
4	De La Salle Lady Green Tennisters	8	3	5	
5	Ateneo Blue Eagles (H)	8	0	8	

Updated to match(es) played on 15 February 2026. Source: The UAAP
Rules for classification: 1) number of wins; 2) if tied for #2 or #4, one-tie playoff; 3) head-to-head record; 4) match points; 5) matches ratio; 6) games ratio
(H) Hosts

==== Finals ====
Team 1	Series	Team 2	Game 1	Game 2	Game 3
NU Lady Bulldogs	2–0	UP Fighting Maroons	3–2	3–1	–

==== Awards ====
- Most Valuable Player: Kaye-Anne Emana (UST Female Tennisters) and Elizabeth Abarquez (NU Lady Bulldogs)
- Finals Most Valuable Player: Elizabeth Abarquez (NU Lady Bulldogs)
- Rookie of the Year: Marielle Jarata (UP Fighting Maroons)

=== Boys' tournament ===
Key

- Q = Qualifier
- WC = Wild card
- LL = Lucky loser
- Alt = Alternate
- ITF = ITF entry
- PR = Protected ranking
- SR = Special ranking
- SE = Special exempt
- JE = Junior exempt
- JR = Junior Accelerator Programme entrant
- CO = College Accelerator Programme entrant
- NG = Next Gen Accelerator Program entrant
- w/o = Walkover
- r = Retired
- d = Defaulted

==== Singles draw ====
Round of 16
J Labasano	0	6	6
R Baje	6	0	3
Z Flores	1	1
M Lagac	6	6
A Cabaral	6	6
J Reyes	1	3
N Olalia	1	3
R Wong	6	6

Quarterfinals
S Salazar	1	1
J Labasano	6	6
M Lagac	6	r
A De Los Santos	3
AT Licayan	5	7^{7}	2
A Cabaral	7	6^{2}	6
R Wong	6	6
M Montinola	3	4

Semifinals
J Labasano	3	0
M Lagac	6	6
A Cabaral	6	6
R Wong	1	0

Finals
M Lagac	6	6^{1}	3
A Cabaral	2	7^{7}	6

==== Doubles draw ====
Round of 16
R Wong; Z Flores	1	0
K Luzon; A De Los Santos	6	6
K Saga; AT Licayan	6	6
J De Ocampo; J Del Rosario	1	1

Quarterfinals
M Dimalaluan; V Garcia	0	0
A Cabaral; J Labasano	6	6
K Luzon; A De Los Santos	6	6
Q Marty; P Feria	0	0
R Baje; N Oliala	0	2
K Saga; AT Licayan	6	6
M Lagac; J Reyes	6	6
S Salazar; M Montinola	4	1

Semifinals
A Cabaral; J Labasano	5	2
K Luzon; A De Los Santos	7	6
K Saga; AT Licayan	6	6
M Lagac; J Reyes	1	3

Finals
K Luzon; A De Los Santos	6	6
K Saga; AT Licayan	1	2

==== Team Event Elimination round ====
Pos	Team	Pld	W	L	Qualification
1	UE Junior Red Warriors	5	5	0	Twice-to-beat in the semifinals
2	NUNS Bullpups	5	4	1	Twice-to-beat in the semifinals
3	Ateneo Blue Eagles (H)	5	3	2	Twice-to-win in the semifinals
4	DLSZ Junior Green Tennisters	5	2	3	Twice-to-win in the semifinals
5	UST Junior Male Tennisters	5	1	4	
6	Southridge Admirals (G)	5	0	5	

Updated to match(es) played on 15 February 2026. Source: The UAAP
Rules for classification: 1) number of wins; 2) if tied for #2 or #4, one-tie playoff; 3) head-to-head record; 4) match points; 5) matches ratio; 6) games ratio
(G) Guests; (H) Hosts

==== Playoffs ====
Semifinals (Nos. 1 & 2 have twice-to-beat advantage)
1	UE	3
4	DLSZ	0
2	NUNS	2
3	Ateneo	0

Final (Single-elimination)
1	UE	2
2	NUNS	1
Third place (Single-elimination)
4	DLSZ	0
3	Ateneo	3

==== Awards ====
- Most Valuable Player: Kobi Luzon (UE Junior Red Warriors) and Aser Delos Santos (UE Junior Red Warriors)

== Fencing ==
The UAAP fencing championships were held from March 13 to 16, 2026 at the Makati Coliseum.

=== Men's tournament ===
==== Medal tally ====
Rank	Team	Medals			
Rank	Team	1st place, gold medalist(s)	2nd place, silver medalist(s)	3rd place, bronze medalist(s)	Total
1st place, gold medalist(s)	UE Red Warriors (H)	3	2	2	7
2nd place, silver medalist(s)	DLSU Green Fencers	1	2	3	6
3rd place, bronze medalist(s)	UP Fighting Maroons	1	2	2	5
4	UST Tiger Fencers	1	0	4	5
5	Ateneo Blue Eagles	0	0	1	1

==== Awards ====
- Most Valuable Player: Shawn Nicollei Felipe (UE Red Warriors)
- Rookie of the Year: Calix Ho (UP Fighting Maroons)

=== Women's tournament ===
==== Medal tally ====
Rank	Team	Medals			
Rank	Team	1st place, gold medalist(s)	2nd place, silver medalist(s)	3rd place, bronze medalist(s)	Total
1st place, gold medalist(s)	UE Lady Warriors (H)	3	1	5	9
2nd place, silver medalist(s)	UP Fighting Maroons	3	1	2	6
3rd place, bronze medalist(s)	UST Lady Fencers	0	2	2	4
4	DLSU Lady Fencers	0	2	1	3
5	Ateneo Blue Eagles	0	0	2	2

==== Awards ====
- Most Valuable Player: Queen Dalmacio (UE Lady Warriors)
- Rookie of the Year: Alyzabeth Gilbert (UE Lady Warriors)

=== Boys' tournament ===
==== Medal tally ====
Rank	Team	Medals			
Rank	Team	1st place, gold medalist(s)	2nd place, silver medalist(s)	3rd place, bronze medalist(s)	Total
1st place, gold medalist(s)	UE Junior Red Warriors (H)	4	2	1	7
2nd place, silver medalist(s)	Southridge Admirals (G)	1	0	2	3
3rd place, bronze medalist(s)	DLSZ Junior Green Fencers	1	0	1	2
4	Ateneo Blue Eagles	0	2	6	8
5	UST Junior Tiger Fencers	0	2	2	4
6	UPIS Junior Fighting Maroons	0	0	0	0

==== Awards ====
- Most Valuable Player: James Limuel Lim (UE Junior Red Warriors)
- Rookie of the Year: Matteo Canlas (UE Junior Red Warriors)

=== Girls' tournament ===
==== Medal tally ====
Rank	Team	Medals			
Rank	Team	1st place, gold medalist(s)	2nd place, silver medalist(s)	3rd place, bronze medalist(s)	Total
1st place, gold medalist(s)	UST Junior Lady Fencers	3	3	3	9
2nd place, silver medalist(s)	UE Junior Lady Warriors (H)	3	1	3	7
3rd place, bronze medalist(s)	Ateneo Blue Eagles	0	1	4	5
4	DLSZ Junior Lady Fencers	0	1	2	3

==== Awards ====
- Most Valuable Player: Sophia Cantantan (UE Junior Lady Warriors)
- Rookie of the Year: Christine Mae Morales (UE Junior Lady Warriors)

== Judo ==
Pos.	Pts.
1st	7
2nd	3
3rd	1

The UAAP judo tournaments were held from April 11–12, 2026 at the Rizal Memorial Coliseum in Manila.

=== Men's tournament ===
==== Team standings ====
Rank	Team	Medals				Points
Rank	Team	1st place, gold medalist(s)	2nd place, silver medalist(s)	3rd place, bronze medalist(s)	Total	Points
1st place, gold medalist(s)	UST Tiger Judokas	4	7	2	13	51
2nd place, silver medalist(s)	UP Fighting Maroons	2	0	4	6	18
3rd place, bronze medalist(s)	Ateneo Blue Eagles	1	1	4	6	14
4	De La Salle Green Judokas	1	0	6	7	13
5	Adamson Soaring Falcons	0	0	0	0	0

==== Awards ====
- Most Valuable Player: Kyan Ballecer (UST Tiger Judokas)
- Rookie of the Year: Aeon Lance Kim (UST Tiger Judokas)

=== Women's tournament ===
==== Team standings ====
Rank	Team	Medals				Points
Rank	Team	1st place, gold medalist(s)	2nd place, silver medalist(s)	3rd place, bronze medalist(s)	Total	Points
1st place, gold medalist(s)	UST Lady Judokas	4	1	4	9	35
2nd place, silver medalist(s)	UP Fighting Maroons	2	3	2	7	25
3rd place, bronze medalist(s)	UE Lady Warriors (H)	1	2	4	7	17
4	De La Salle Lady Judokas	1	0	3	4	10
5	Ateneo Blue Eagles	0	1	1	2	4
6	Adamson Lady Falcons	0	1	0	1	3

==== Awards ====
- Most Valuable Player: Christine Quiniones (UST Lady Judokas)
- Rookie of the Year: Rovy Mae Ujano (UP Fighting Maroons)

=== Boys' tournament ===
==== Team standings ====
Rank	Team	Medals				Points
Rank	Team	1st place, gold medalist(s)	2nd place, silver medalist(s)	3rd place, bronze medalist(s)	Total	Points
1st place, gold medalist(s)	UST Junior Tiger Judokas	4	2	6	12	40
2nd place, silver medalist(s)	Ateneo Blue Eagles	3	2	5	10	32
3rd place, bronze medalist(s)	UE Junior Red Warriors (H)	1	2	3	6	16
4	DLSZ Junior Green Judokas	0	1	2	3	7

==== Awards ====
- Most Valuable Player: Zachary Cabrera (UST Junior Tiger Judokas)
- Rookie of the Year: Miguel Tecson (DLSZ Junior Green Judokas)

=== Girls' tournament ===
==== Team standings ====
Rank	Team	Medals				Points
Rank	Team	1st place, gold medalist(s)	2nd place, silver medalist(s)	3rd place, bronze medalist(s)	Total	Points
1st place, gold medalist(s)	UST Junior Lady Judokas	5	5	4	14	54
2nd place, silver medalist(s)	UE Junior Lady Warriors (H)	3	3	2	8	32
–	Ateneo Blue Eagles	0	0	0	0	0
–	DLSZ Junior Lady Judokas	0	0	0	0	0

==== Awards ====
- Most Valuable Player: Zkeana Valdez (UST Junior Lady Judokas)

== Taekwondo ==
The UAAP taekwondo championships began on April 21, 2026 at the Rizal Memorial Coliseum in Manila.

=== Poomsae ===
==== Collegiate tournament ====
Rank	Team	Medals			
Rank	Team	1st place, gold medalist(s)	2nd place, silver medalist(s)	3rd place, bronze medalist(s)	Total
1st place, gold medalist(s)	NU Bulldogs	4	0	2	6
2nd place, silver medalist(s)	UST Tiger Jins	1	4	0	5
3rd place, bronze medalist(s)	De La Salle Green Jins (H)	1	1	3	5
4	UP Fighting Maroons	0	0	3	3
5	Ateneo Blue Eagles	0	0	2	2
6	FEU Tamaraws	0	0	0	0

==== Awards ====
- Most Valuable Player: Ian Corton (NU Bulldogs)
- Rookie of the Year: Carl Ong (NU Bulldogs)

==== High school tournament ====
Rank	Team	Medals			
Rank	Team	1st place, gold medalist(s)	2nd place, silver medalist(s)	3rd place, bronze medalist(s)	Total
1st place, gold medalist(s)	UST Junior Tiger Jins	2	1	0	3
2nd place, silver medalist(s)	NUNS Bullpups	1	2	3	6
3rd place, bronze medalist(s)	Ateneo Blue Eagles	1	1	0	2
4	FEU–D Baby Tamaraws	0	0	0	0
5	De La Salle Junior Green Jins (H)	0	0	0	0

==== Awards ====
- Most Valuable Player: Angel Dacanay (UST Junior Tiger Jins)
- Rookie of the Year: Aesha Oglayon (NUNS Bullpups)

=== Kyorugi ===
==== Men's tournament ====
Rank	Team	Medals			
Rank	Team	1st place, gold medalist(s)	2nd place, silver medalist(s)	3rd place, bronze medalist(s)	Total
1st place, gold medalist(s)	NU Bulldogs	2	4	0	6
2nd place, silver medalist(s)	UST Tiger Jins	2	2	4	8
3rd place, bronze medalist(s)	Ateneo Blue Eagles	1	1	1	3
4	UP Fighting Maroons	1	0	5	6
5	De La Salle Green Jins (H)	1	0	3	4
6	FEU Tamaraws	0	0	1	1

==== Awards ====
- Most Valuable Player: Kenneth Buenavides (NU Bulldogs)
- Rookie of the Year: Michael Cabaluna (Ateneo Blue Eagles)

==== Women's tournament ====
Rank	Team	Medals			
Rank	Team	1st place, gold medalist(s)	2nd place, silver medalist(s)	3rd place, bronze medalist(s)	Total
1st place, gold medalist(s)	NU Lady Bulldogs	4	3	1	8
2nd place, silver medalist(s)	UST Lady Jins	2	3	1	6
3rd place, bronze medalist(s)	De La Salle Lady Jins (H)	1	0	1	2
4	UP Fighting Maroons	0	1	4	5
5	FEU Lady Tamaraws	0	0	4	4
6	Ateneo Blue Eagles	0	0	3	3

==== Awards ====
- Most Valuable Player: Rajany Santos (NU Lady Bulldogs)
- Rookie of the Year: Tachiana Magin (UST Lady Jins)

==== Boys' tournament ====
Rank	Team	Medals			
Rank	Team	1st place, gold medalist(s)	2nd place, silver medalist(s)	3rd place, bronze medalist(s)	Total
1st place, gold medalist(s)	FEU–D Baby Tamaraws	3	0	3	6
2nd place, silver medalist(s)	UST Junior Tiger Jins	2	2	1	5
3rd place, bronze medalist(s)	NUNS Bullpups	0	2	3	5
4	Ateneo Blue Eagles	0	1	1	2
5	DLSZ Junior Green Jins (H)	0	0	2	2
6	UPIS Junior Fighting Maroons	0	0	0	0

==== Awards ====
- Most Valuable Player: Josh Pinatacan (FEU–D Baby Tamaraws)
- Rookie of the Year: Karl Batulayan (FEU–D Baby Tamaraws)

==== Girls' tournament ====
The overall rankings were not released for the girls' tournament, but the NUNS Lady Bullpups dominated the tournament with four gold medals after sweeping all their finals assignments.

== 3×3 basketball ==
The UAAP 3x3 basketball championships were held from April 27 to May 3, 2026. The tournament venue was the Ayala Malls Manila Bay in Parañaque.

=== Men's tournament ===
==== Elimination round ====
Pos	Team	W	L	PCT	Qualification
1	De La Salle Green Archers (H)	7	0	1.000	Advanced to the semifinals
2	Ateneo Blue Eagles	6	1	.857	Advanced to the semifinals
3	Adamson Soaring Falcons	4	3	.571	Advanced to the semifinals
4	NU Bulldogs	3	4	.429	Advanced to the semifinals
5	FEU Tamaraws	3	4	.429	
6	UP Fighting Maroons	3	4	.429	
7	UST Growling Tigers	1	6	.143	
8	UE Red Warriors	1	6	.143	

Source: UAAP Season 88 3x3
Rules for classification: 1) winning percentage; 2) head-to-head record; 3) head-to-head goal average (quotient); 4) overall quotient
(H) Hosts

==== Final round ====
===== Bracket =====
Semifinals
1	La Salle	21
4	NU	14
2	Ateneo	21
3	Adamson	13

Final
1	La Salle	21
2	Ateneo	18
Third place
4	NU	17
3	Adamson	13

===== Match results =====
All times are Philippine Standard Time (UTC+08:00).

Semifinals
Date	Time	Team 1	Score	Team 2
May 03	13:00	De La Salle Green Archers	21–14	NU Bulldogs
May 03	13:20	Ateneo Blue Eagles	21–13	Adamson Soaring Falcons

Third place
Date	Time	Team 1	Score	Team 2
May 03	15:00	NU Bulldogs	17–13	Adamson Soaring Falcons

Final
Date	Time	Team 1	Score	Team 2
May 03	16:40	De La Salle Green Archers	21–18	Ateneo Blue Eagles

=== Women's tournament ===
==== Elimination round ====
Pos	Team	W	L	PCT	Qualification
1	UST Growling Tigresses	7	0	1.000	Advanced to the semifinals
2	Ateneo Blue Eagles	5	2	.714	Advanced to the semifinals
3	FEU Lady Tamaraws	5	2	.714	Advanced to the semifinals
4	Adamson Lady Falcons	4	3	.571	Advanced to the semifinals
5	De La Salle Lady Archers (H)	3	4	.429	
6	UP Fighting Maroons	2	5	.286	
7	NU Lady Bulldogs	1	6	.143	
8	UE Lady Red Warriors	1	6	.143	

Source: UAAP Season 88 3x3
Rules for classification: 1) winning percentage; 2) head-to-head record; 3) head-to-head goal average (quotient); 4) overall quotient
(H) Hosts

==== Final round ====
===== Bracket =====
Semifinals
1	UST	21
4	Adamson	10
2	Ateneo	16
3	FEU	21

Final
1	UST	21
3	FEU	11
Third place
4	Adamson	14
2	Ateneo	16

===== Match results =====
All times are Philippine Standard Time (UTC+08:00).

Semifinals
Date	Time	Team 1	Score	Team 2
May 03	12:20	UST Growling Tigresses	21–10	Adamson Lady Falcons
May 03	12:40	Ateneo Blue Eagles	16–21	FEU Lady Tamaraws

Third place
Date	Time	Team 1	Score	Team 2
May 03	14:40	Adamson Lady Falcons	14–16	Ateneo Blue Eagles

Final
Date	Time	Team 1	Score	Team 2
May 03	16:20	UST Growling Tigresses	21–11	FEU Lady Tamaraws

=== Boys' 19U tournament ===
==== Elimination round ====
Pos	Team	W	L	PCT	Qualification
1	UST Tiger Cubs	7	0	1.000	Advanced to the semifinals
2	FEU–D Baby Tamaraws	5	2	.714	Advanced to the semifinals
3	Zobel Junior Archers (H)	5	2	.714	Advanced to the semifinals
4	NUNS Bullpups	4	3	.571	Advanced to the semifinals
5	UPIS Junior Fighting Maroons	2	5	.286	
6	Ateneo Blue Eagles	2	5	.286	
7	UE Junior Red Warriors	2	5	.286	
8	Adamson Baby Falcons	1	6	.143	

Source: UAAP Season 88 3x3
Rules for classification: 1) winning percentage; 2) head-to-head record; 3) head-to-head goal average (quotient); 4) overall quotient
(H) Hosts

==== Final round ====
===== Bracket =====
Semifinals
1	UST	21
4	NUNS	18
2	FEU–D	21
3	DLSZ	18

Final
1	UST	17
2	FEU–D	21
Third place
4	NUNS	21
3	DLSZ	18

===== Match results =====
All times are Philippine Standard Time (UTC+08:00).

Semifinals
Date	Time	Team 1	Score	Team 2
May 03	11:40	UST Tiger Cubs	21–18	NUNS Bullpups
May 03	12:00	FEU–D Baby Tamaraws	21–18	Zobel Junior Archers

Third place
Date	Time	Team 1	Score	Team 2
May 03	14:20	NUNS Bullpups	21–18	Zobel Junior Archers

Final
Date	Time	Team 1	Score	Team 2
May 03	16:00	UST Tiger Cubs	18–21	FEU–D Baby Tamaraws

=== Girls' HS tournament ===
==== Elimination round ====
Pos	Team	W	L	PCT	Qualification
1	NUNS Lady Bullpups	3	0	1.000	Advanced to the final
2	UST Junior Tigresses	2	1	.667	Advanced to the final
3	Zobel Junior Lady Archers (H)	1	2	.333	Advanced to the third place match
4	Ateneo Blue Eagles	0	3	.000	Advanced to the third place match

Source: UAAP Season 88 3x3
Rules for classification: 1) winning percentage; 2) head-to-head record; 3) head-to-head goal average (quotient); 4) overall quotient
(H) Hosts

==== Final round ====
===== Match results =====
All times are Philippine Standard Time (UTC+08:00).

Third place
Date	Time	Team 1	Score	Team 2
May 03	13:40	Zobel Junior Lady Archers	16–1	Ateneo Blue Eagles

Final
Date	Time	Team 1	Score	Team 2
May 03	15:40	NUNS Lady Bullpups	20–13	UST Junior Tigresses

=== Boys' 16U tournament ===
==== Elimination round ====
Pos	Team	W	L	PCT	Qualification
1	FEU–D Baby Tamaraws	6	1	.857	Advanced to the semifinals
2	Ateneo Blue Eagles	5	2	.714	Advanced to the semifinals
3	Zobel Junior Archers (H)	4	3	.571	Advanced to the semifinals
4	UE Junior Red Warriors	4	3	.571	Advanced to the semifinals
5	Adamson Baby Falcons	3	4	.429	
6	UST Tiger Cubs	3	4	.429	
7	NUNS Bullpups	3	4	.429	
8	UPIS Junior Fighting Maroons	0	7	.000	

Source: UAAP Season 88 3x3
Rules for classification: 1) winning percentage; 2) head-to-head record; 3) head-to-head goal average (quotient); 4) overall quotient
(H) Hosts

==== Final round ====
===== Bracket =====
Semifinals
1	FEU–D	21
4	UE	15
2	Ateneo	19
3	DLSZ	11

Final
1	FEU–D	18
2	Ateneo	21
Third place
4	UE	22
3	DLSZ	13

===== Match results =====
All times are Philippine Standard Time (UTC+08:00).

Semifinals
Date	Time	Team 1	Score	Team 2
May 03	11:00	Ateneo Blue Eagles	19–11	Zobel Junior Archers
May 03	11:20	FEU–D Baby Tamaraws	21–15	UE Junior Red Warriors

Third place
Date	Time	Team 1	Score	Team 2
May 03	14:00	UE Junior Red Warriors	22–13	Zobel Junior Archers

Final
Date	Time	Team 1	Score	Team 2
May 03	15:20	Ateneo Blue Eagles	21–18	FEU–D Baby Tamaraws

=== Medalists and Awards ===
Division	Gold	Silver	Bronze
Men's tournament	De La Salle Green Archers; Earl Jared Abadam; Andrei Dungo; Elaijah Gollena; Jan Clement Macalalag; Manuel Antonio Luis Pablo	Ateneo Blue Eagles; Andrew Bongo; Alden Cainglet; Romeo Ebdane III; Kyle Gamber; Arien Shawn Tuano	NU Bulldogs; Paul John Francisco; Justine Garcia; Jolo Navarro; John Reyes; Nathaniel Tulabut
Women's tournament	UST Growling Tigresses; Nicole Anne Danganan; Erinn McAlary; Kent Jane Pastrana; Bridgette Santos; Karylle Sierba	FEU Lady Tamaraws; Maxene de la Torre; Amyah Espanol; Maria Pasilang; Elaine Patio; Cassandra Shane Salvani	Ateneo Blue Eagles; Erica Mae de Luna; Quinn Kacey Dela Rosa; Lauren Ysabel Lopez; Hannah Lopez; Kailah Jade Oani
Boys' 19U tournament	FEU–D Baby Tamaraws; Adrian Alagaban; Marc Burgos; William Cabonilas; Jan Cagurungan; Sam Hall	UST Tiger Cubs; Kirk Cañete; Charles Esteban; Joaquin Ludovice; Jhon Lee Melano; Simon Pulongbarit	NUNS Bullpups; Sofiane Bouzina; Chad Cartel; John Figueroa; Rhon Matias; Meikho Natinga
Girls' HS tournament	NUNS Lady Bullpups; KJ Badajos; Quennie Cordero; Ma. Christina Lapasaran; Ruiza Jhane Olmos; Zaydhen Rosano	UST Junior Tigresses; Jesabel Anacan; Katrina Insoy; Janice Oczon; Sofia Petalcorin; Lea Pinuela	Zobel Junior Lady Archers; Stefi Contreras; Alfia Dulay; Sofia Martinez; Keisha Ogario; Jovanna Winar
Boys' 16U tournament	Ateneo Blue Eagles; Stefan Bernarte; Simone Jacob "Sky" Jazul; Jeff Juangco; Mateo Ngo; Marco Yoro	FEU–D Baby Tamaraws; Dwayne Cañete; Prince Cariño; James Andrei Chavez; Dwyne Enriquez; Kyle Mojica	UE Junior Red Warriors; Zion Aguilar; Sean Felizmenia; James Mesa; Goodluck Okebata; Mark Perdigon

Division	Most Valuable Player	Rookie of the Year
Men	Manuel Antonio Luis Pablo; De La Salle Green Archers	Kirby Mongcopa; FEU Tamaraws
Women	Kent Jane Pastrana; UST Growling Tigresses	Clerence Oñate; UE Lady Warriors
Boys 19U	Marc Daniel Burgos; FEU–D Baby Tamaraws	Lorenzo Purugganan; Zobel Junior Archers
HS Girls	Ruiza Jhane Olmos; NUNS Lady Bullpups	Ruiza Jhane Olmos; NUNS Lady Bullpups
Boys 16U	Simone Jacob "Sky" Jazul; Ateneo Blue Eagles	—

== Golf ==
The UAAP Golf Tournament was held for the first time as a demonstration sport from May 11 to 14 at the Tagaytay Midlands in Tagaytay, Cavite

=== Medal summary ===
Event	Gold	Silver	Bronze
Men's team	De La Salle Green Archers; Perry Bucay; Zachary Castro; Jacob Cajita; Martin Lu	UP Fighting Maroons; Joshua Buenaventura; Miggy Roque; Emilio Carpio; Laurence Sengia	Ateneo Blue Eagles; Glenn Unabia; Mich Romero; Schmuel Tan; Juan Escano
Men's individual	Perry Bucay; De La Salle Green Archers	Joshua Buenaventura; UP Fighting Maroons	Zach Castro; De La Salle Green Archers
Women's team	De La Salle Lady Archers; Julia Lua; Alexa Dacanay; Donnabel Magsino; Janine Yusay	Ateneo Blue Eagles; Monique Mendoza; Simi Tinio; Andie Joson; Renee Heredia	UP Fighting Maroons; Annika Gozum; Ava Heredia; Janna Tan; Katrisse Datoc
Women's individual	Julia Lua; De La Salle Lady Archers	Alexa Dacanay; De La Salle Lady Archers	Monique Mendoza; Ateneo Blue Eagles

=== Men's tournament ===
==== Team standings ====
Pos	Team	Score
1st place, gold medalist(s)	De La Salle Green Archers (H)	898
2nd place, silver medalist(s)	UP Fighting Maroons	928
3rd place, bronze medalist(s)	Ateneo Blue Eagles	938
4	UST Growling Tigers	1005
5	Adamson Soaring Falcons	1447

Source: The UAAP
(H) Host

==== Awards ====
- Most Valuable Player: Perry Bucay (De La Salle Green Archers)

=== Women's tournament ===
==== Team standings ====
Pos	Team	Score
1st place, gold medalist(s)	De La Salle Lady Archers (H)	1056
3rd place, bronze medalist(s)	UP Fighting Maroons	1138
2nd place, silver medalist(s)	Ateneo Blue Eagles	1077
4	UST Growling Tigresses	1289
5	Adamson Lady Falcons	1478

Source: The UAAP
(H) Host

==== Awards ====
- Most Valuable Player: Julia Lua (De La Salle Lady Archers)

== Esports ==
The 2026 UAAP Esports Tournament was held at the MVP Studios at the TV5 Media Center in Mandaluyong.

=== Valorant ===
==== Group A ====
===== Team standings =====
Pos	Team	W	D	L	Pts	Qualification
1	Adamson Soaring Falcons	2	1	0	7	Advances to semifinals
2	UE Red Warriors	2	0	1	6	Advances to semifinals
3	UST Teletigers	1	1	1	4	
4	Ateneo Blue Eagles	0	0	3	0	

Rules for classification: 1) winning percentage; 2) head-to-head record; 3) head-to-head point differential; 4) overall point differential

==== Group B ====
===== Team standings =====
Pos	Team	W	D	L	Pts	Qualification
1	NU Bulldogs	1	2	0	5	Advances to semifinals
2	UP Fighting Maroons	1	1	1	4	Advances to semifinals
3	DLSU Green Aces	0	3	0	3	
4	FEU Tamaraws	0	2	1	2	

Rules for classification: 1) winning percentage; 2) head-to-head record; 3) head-to-head point differential; 4) overall point differential

==== Bracket ====
Semifinals (Best-of-three series)
A1	Adamson	13	13
B2	UP	8	7
B1	NU	13	13
A2	UE	7	3

Finals (Best-of-three series)
A1	Adamson	13	12	8
B1	NU	7	14	13

=== Mobile Legends: Bang Bang ===
==== Group A ====
===== Team standings =====
Pos	Team	W	D	L	Pts	Qualification
1	NU Bulldogs	2	0	1	6	Advances to semifinals
2	DLSU Green Aces	1	2	0	5	Advances to semifinals
3	UE Red Warriors	0	2	1	2	
4	UST Teletigers	0	2	1	2	

Rules for classification: 1) winning percentage; 2) head-to-head record; 3) head-to-head point differential; 4) overall point differential

==== Group B ====
===== Team standings =====
Pos	Team	W	D	L	Pts	Qualification
1	Adamson Soaring Falcons	3	0	0	9	Advances to semifinals
2	UP Fighting Maroons	1	1	1	4	Advances to semifinals
3	FEU Tamaraws	0	2	1	2	
4	Ateneo Blue Eagles	0	1	2	1	

Rules for classification: 1) winning percentage; 2) head-to-head record; 3) head-to-head point differential; 4) overall point differential

==== Bracket ====
Semifinals (Best-of-three series)
A1	NU	2
B2	UP	0
B1	Adamson	1
A2	La Salle	2

Finals (Best-of-three series)
A1	NU	2
A2	La Salle	1

=== eFIBA ===
==== Group A ====
===== Team standings =====
Pos	Team	W	D	L	Pts	Qualification
1	UST Teletigers	2	1	0	7 (Note: Head-to-head point differential: UST 122–117 NU)	Advances to semifinals
2	NU Bulldogs	2	1	0	7	Advances to semifinals
3	UP Fighting Maroons	1	0	2	3	
4	FEU Tamaraws	0	0	3	0	

Rules for classification: 1) winning percentage; 2) head-to-head record; 3) head-to-head point differential; 4) overall point differential

==== Group B ====
===== Team standings =====
Pos	Team	W	D	L	Pts	Qualification
1	Adamson Soaring Falcons	3	0	0	9	Advances to semifinals
2	DLSU Green Aces	2	0	1	6	Advances to semifinals
3	Ateneo Blue Eagles	0	1	2	1 (Note: Head-to-head point differential: Ateneo 125–110 UE)	
4	UE Red Warriors	0	1	2	1	

Rules for classification: 1) winning percentage; 2) head-to-head record; 3) head-to-head point differential; 4) overall point differential

==== Bracket ====
Semifinals (Best-of-three series)
A1	UST	70	68	65
B2	La Salle	52	71*	64
B1	Adamson	48	51	44
A2	NU	51	38	51

Finals (Best-of-three series)
A1	UST	51	56
A2	NU	56	74

* = Overtime

== Cheerdance ==
The UAAP Cheerdance Competition was held on November 29, 2025 at the SM Mall of Asia Arena in Pasay City.

=== Team standings ===
Rank	Team	Order	Tumbling	Stunts	Tosses	Pyramids	Dance	Penalties	Points	Percentage
1st place, gold medalist(s)	NU Pep Squad	6th	87.5	89.5	81	87	355	-5	695	86.87%
2nd place, silver medalist(s)	Adamson Pep Squad	3rd	79.5	85.5	77	84	335	-2	659	82.37%
3rd place, bronze medalist(s)	FEU Cheering Squad	7th	90.5	90	79	81.5	339.5	-22	658.5	82.31%
4	UE Pep Squad	2nd	57	83.5	73	74	340.5	-5	623	77.87%
5	UST Salinggawi Dance Troupe	8th	67.5	69.5	75	72	356.5	-22	618.5	77.31%
6	UP Varsity Pep Squad	1st	56.5	78.5	62.5	65	303.5	-8	558	69.75%
7	DLSU Animo Squad	4th	51.5	70	60	68.5	301.5	-5	546.5	68.31%
8	Ateneo Blue Eagles (H)	5th	44	64	47	55	265.5	-39	436.5	54.56%

==== Special Awards ====
UAAP Season 88 cheerdance champions
NU Bulldogs
Ninth title, second consecutive title

- Mwell Power Performance: NU Pep Squad
- Silka Time to Shine Showstopper: NU Pep Squad
- Converge Super FiberX Reliable Performance: NU Pep Squad
- Yamaha Most Unique Dance Move: NU Pep Squad
- Biogenic Armor Up Pyramid: Adamson Pep Squad
- Enervon Most Energetic Team: Adamson Pep Squad
- Skechers Stylish Performance: Adamson Pep Squad
- BIC Smooth Tumbling Pass: Adamson Pep Squad
- Jollibee Jolliest Toss: FEU Tamaraws
- Chingu Bestie Chemistry: UE Pep Squad
- Dove #ChangeYourPerspective Best Hair: DLSU Animo Squad

== Streetdance ==
The UAAP Streetdance Competition was held on May 3, 2026 at the Blue Eagle Gym, and was held for the first time ever as a standalone event as opposed to organizing it as part of the UAAP closing ceremony.

=== Collegiate division ===
Rank	Team	Order	Artistic Total	Execution Total	Deductions	Points
1st place, gold medalist(s)	UP Street Dance Club	1	46.90	46.70	–	93.33
2nd place, silver medalist(s)	UST Prime	8	46.30	46.70	–	92.17
3rd place, bronze medalist(s)	La Salle Dance Company – Street	4	45.50	45.40	–	90.33
4	Adamson University Dance Company – Street	3	–	–	–	89.83
4	Company of Ateneo Dancers – Street (H)	5	–	–	–	89.83
6	NU Dance Company	6	–	–	–	89.00
7	FEU Street Alliance	7	–	–	–	87.83
8	UE – East Force Dance Company	2	–	–	–	79.67

=== High school division ===
Rank	Team	Order	Artistic Total	Execution Total	Deductions	Points
1st place, gold medalist(s)	Adamson University Dance Company – Street SHS	2	44.70	44.00	–	88.17
2nd place, silver medalist(s)	UST Galvanize	7	–	–	–	86.83
3rd place, bronze medalist(s)	T.A.M. Streetz	6	–	–	–	85.50
4	NUDC – Nazalian Street	5	–	–	–	85.17
5	Indayog ng Atenistang Kabataan (H)	4	–	–	–	84.83
6	UE – East Force Varsity	1	–	–	–	76.67
7	Zobel Dance Crew	3	–	–	–	76.50

== Overall awards ==
The following were awarded during the closing ceremonies on May 15, 2026, at the Quadricentennial Pavilion.

=== Overall champion ===
==== Collegiate ====
- University of Santo Tomas, 9th straight and 49th overall

==== High school ====
- University of Santo Tomas, 10th straight and 25th overall

=== Athlete of the Year ===
==== Collegiate ====
===== Individual sports =====
- Queen Dalmacio ( UE Lady Warriors), fencing

===== Team sports =====
- Charles Lobitaña ( UP Fighting Maroons), men's football
- Mae Langga ( Adamson Soaring Falcons), softball

==== High school ====
===== Individual sports =====
- Ruelle Canino ( FEU–D Lady Baby Tamaraws), girls' standard chess and girls' blitz chess

===== Team sports =====
- Wilhalm Cabonilas ( FEU–D Baby Tamaraws), boys' basketball and boys' 3x3 basketball
- Rhiane Perez ( UST Junior Tigresses), girls' basketball and girls' 3x3 basketball

=== Athlete-Scholar of the Year ===
==== Collegiate ====
- Christine Guerio ( Adamson Lady Falcons), women's athletics
- Rae Tolentino ( Ateneo Blue Eagles), women's football
- Angelou Laude ( DLSU Lady Paddlers), women's table tennis
- Vic Derotas ( FEU Lady Tamaraws), women's standard chess and women's blitz chess
- Jessica Carcueva ( NU Lady Bulldogs), women's tennis
- Shawn Felipe ( UE Red Warriors), men's fencing
- Jufe-Ann Cocoy ( UP Fighting Maroons), women's tennis
- Kent Pastrana ( UST Growling Tigers), women's basketball and women's 3x3 basketball

==== High school ====
- Troy Sambilad ( Adamson Baby Falcons), boys' football
- Trixie Ortiguera ( Ateneo Blue Eagles), girls' swimming
- Pi Durden Wangkay ( DLSZ Junior Green Tracksters), boys' athletics
- Ruelle Canino ( FEU–D Lady Baby Tamaraws), girls' standard chess and girls' blitz chess
- Sarah Dalagan ( FEU–D Lady Baby Tamaraws), girls' standard chess and girls' blitz chess
- Yuna Canlas ( UE Junior Lady Warriors), girls' fencing
- Liv Florendo ( UPIS Junior Fighting Maroons),girls' swimming
- Zkeana Valdez ( UST Junior Lady Judokas), girls' judo

== Event calendar ==
OC	Opening ceremony	●	Event month	1	Gold medal month	CC	Closing ceremony

UAAP Season 88		2025				2026							
UAAP Season 88		Sep	Oct	Nov	Dec	Jan	Feb	Mar	Apr	May	Jun	Jul	Aug
Ceremonies		OC								CC			
Athletics				M/W/B/G									
Swimming				M/W/B/G									
Badminton			M/W										
Basketball	5-on-5	M/W/16U	M/W/16U	M/W/16U	M/W/16U	19U/G	19U/G	19U/G					
Basketball	3x3								AD (Note: All divisions (M/W/G/B19U/B16U).)	AD			
Baseball						B	M/B	M	M				
Chess	Standard	M/W/B/G	M/W/B/G										
Chess	Blitz								M/W/B/G				
Fencing								M/W/B/G					
Football		M/W	M/W	W		M/B	M/B	B					
Judo									M/W/B/G				
Softball							W	W	W				
Table tennis				M/W/B/G									
Taekwondo	Kyorugi								M/W/B/G				
Taekwondo	Poomsae								C/HS				
Tennis							M/W/B	M/W/B					
Volleyball	Indoor	B/G	B/G	B/G	B/G		M/W	M/W	M/W	M/W			
Volleyball	Beach			M/W			B/G						
Special Events
Cheerdance				C									
Golf										M/W			
Streetdance										C/HS			
Esports													C
		Sep	Oct	Nov	Dec	Jan	Feb	Mar	Apr	May	Jun	Jul	Aug
		2025				2026							

== General championship summary ==
The general champion is determined by a point system. The system gives 15 points to the champion team of a UAAP event, 12 to the runner-up, and 10 to the third placer. The following points: 8, 6, 4, 2 and 1 are given to the rest of the participating teams according to their order of finish.

=== Medal tables ===
==== Collegiate division ====
Rank	Team	Gold	Silver	Bronze	Total
1	University of Santo Tomas*	10	5	7	22
2	National University	8	5	4	17
3	Far Eastern University	4	6	3	13
4	De La Salle University	3	6	7	16
5	Ateneo de Manila University	3	3	7	13
6	University of the Philippines Diliman	2	8	3	13
7	University of the East	2	0	1	3
8	Adamson University	1	0	1	2
Totals (8 entries)		33	33	33	99

* Host nation (Season host); General champions
Notes: Results are final.

==== High school division ====
Rank	Team	Gold	Silver	Bronze	Total
1	University of Santo Tomas*	13	6	2	21
2	Far Eastern University–Diliman	6	4	2	12
3	National University–Nazareth School	3	6	5	14
4	University of the East	2	2	6	10
5	Adamson University	1	3	3	7
5	Ateneo de Manila University	1	3	3	7
7	De La Salle Zobel	0	2	6	8
8	UP Integrated School	0	0	1	1
Totals (8 entries)		26	26	28	80

* Host nation (Season host); General champions
Notes: Results are final.

=== General championship tally ===
==== Collegiate division ====
		Basketball		3x3 basketball		Volleyball (indoor)		Volleyball (beach)		Swimming		Chess		Chess (game)		Tennis		Table tennis		Badminton		Taekwondo			Judo		Baseball	Softball	Football		Athletics		Fencing		Total			
Rank	Team	M	W	M	W	M	W	M	W	M	W	M	W	M	W	M	W	M	W	M	W	M	W	C	M	W	M	W	M	W	M	W	M	W	M	W	C	Overall
1	UST (H)	8	15	2	15	10	10	15	15	10	8	15	8	15	6	15	10	15	12	6	8	12	12	12	15	15	6	10	10	8	8	12	8	10	170	174	12	356
2	La Salle	15	4	15	6	6	15	2	2	12	10	10	12	10	12	6	8	6	10	8	6	6	10	10	8	8	12	8	8	12	1	10	12	8	137	141	10	288
3	UP	12	2	4	4	1	4	4	8	8	15	6	2	6	4	12	12	4	4	12	10	8	8	8	12	12	8	12	15	6	10	8	10	12	132	123	8	263
4	Ateneo	4	10	12	10	8	2	10	6	15	12	8	6	8	10	2	6	12	8	15	15	10	4	6	10	6	4	6	6	10	6	1	6	6	136	118	6	260
5	NU	10	12	10	2	15	12	12	12	—	—	—	15	—	8	10	15	—	—	10	12	15	15	15	—	—	15	—	—	—	15	2	—	—	112	105	15	232
6	FEU	6	6	6	12	12	6	8	10	—	—	12	10	12	15	—	—	10	15	—	—	4	6	4	—	—	—	—	12	15	12	15	—	—	94	110	4	208
7	Adamson	2	8	8	8	2	8	6	4	—	—	4	4	4	2	4	—	8	2	4	4	—	—	—	6	4	10	15	4	—	4	4	—	—	66	63	0	129
8	UE	1	1	1	1	4	1	1	1	—	—	—	—	—	—	8	—	2	6	—	—	—	—	—	—	10	—	—	2	—	2	6	15	15	36	41	0	77

(H) Season host; = Champion; = Runner-up; = Third place; — = No team.
Notes: Results are final.

==== High School division ====
		Basketball			3x3 basketball			Volleyball (indoor)		Volleyball (beach)		Swimming		Chess		Chess (game)		Table tennis		Taekwondo	Judo		Baseball	Football	Athletics		Fencing		Total		
Rank	Team	B	G	K	B	G	K	B	G	B	G	B	G	B	G	B	G	B	G	B	B	G	B	B	B	G	B	G	B	G	Overall
1	UST (H)	4	15	10	12	12	4	8	8	15	15	15	15	15	15	12	10	15	15	12	15	15	8	12	15	12	6	15	164	147	325
2	DLSZ	8	10	1	8	10	8	4	6	2	6	10	8	6	4	6	6	8	12	6	8	9	12	10	6	8	10	8	104	87	200
3	Ateneo	10	8	4	4	8	15	1	2	1	2	12	12	8	6	8	4	6	4	8	12	9	6	6	4	6	8	10	94	71	184
4	FEU–D	15	—	12	15	—	12	10	12	6	8	—	—	12	10	15	15	—	—	15	—	—	—	15	—	—	—	—	103	45	172
5	NUNS	12	12	15	10	15	2	12	15	12	10	—	—	—	12	—	12	—	—	10	—	—	10	—	10	—	—	—	76	76	169
6	UE	6	—	6	6	—	10	15	1	10	1	—	—	—	—	—	—	10	10	—	10	12	—	—	8	10	15	12	80	46	142
7	Adamson	2	—	8	1	—	6	6	10	8	12	—	—	10	8	10	8	12	8	—	—	—	—	4	12	15	—	—	65	61	140
8	UPIS	1	—	2	2	—	1	2	4	4	4	8	10	—	—	—	—	4	6	4	—	—	—	—	—	—	4	—	29	24	56

(H) Season host; = Champion; = Runner-up; = Third place; — = No team.
Notes: Results are final.

== Broadcasting notes ==
=== Personnel ===
Commentators:

- Boom Gonzalez (basketball, volleyball)
- Eric Tipan (basketball, volleyball, badminton, table tennis, tennis)
- Mico Halili (basketball)
- Noreen Go (badminton, table tennis)
- Miguel de Guzman (baseball, softball)
- Bob Guerrero (football)
- Marielle Benitez-Javellana (football)
- Jing Jamlang (football)
- Carlo Manzano (football)
- Synjin Reyes (volleyball, tennis)
- Jaime Ascalon (basketball, volleyball)
- Kobe Dayao (basketball)
- Dyp Dypiangco (basketball)
- Jamie Lavitoria (volleyball)
- Ivy Remulla (volleyball)
- Janna Ehido (volleyball)
- Paula Calingasan (basketball)

Correspondents:

- Frankie Buenvenida ( Adamson)
- Vicsi Burgos ( Ateneo)
- Sophie Espiritu ( La Salle)
- Juliana Marasigan ( FEU)
- Zjheane Luis ( NU)
- Thea Franco ( UE)
- Cheska Ramos ( UP)
- Sidney Oliva ( UST)

Analysts:

- Renzo Subido (basketball)
- Camille Clarin (basketball)
- Kenneth Tuffin (basketball)
- Diego Dario (basketball)
- Willy Wilson (basketball)
- Isaac Go (basketball)
- Brix Ramos (basketball)
- Aaron Black (basketball)
- Tyler Tio (basketball)
- Jett Manuel (basketball)
- Belay Fernando-De La Cruz (football)
- Natasha Alquiros-Deyto (football)
- Matthew Nierras (football)
- Camille Rodriguez (football)
- Ayel Estrañero (volleyball)
- Neil Flores (volleyball)
- Paneng de Koenigswarter (volleyball)
- Anne Remulla-Canda (volleyball)
- Alyssa Valdez (volleyball)
- Jia de Guzman (volleyball)
- Denden Lazaro-Revilla (volleyball)
- Bea de Leon (volleyball)
- Max Juangco (volleyball)
- Julia Coronel (volleyball)
- Maji Mangulabnan (volleyball)

=== Broadcasters ===
Event	Division	Network/s	Streaming	Scope
Basketball	Collegiate	One Sports; UAAP Varsity Channel	Pilipinas Live	All games
Basketball	19U and 16U	UAAP Varsity Channel	Pilipinas Live	All games
Volleyball	Collegiate	One Sports; UAAP Varsity Channel	Pilipinas Live	All games
Volleyball	HS	UAAP Varsity Channel	Pilipinas Live	All games
Football	Men's	One Sports; UAAP Varsity Channel	Pilipinas Live	All games
Football	Women's	UAAP Varsity Channel	Pilipinas Live	All games
Football	Boys'	—N/a	Pilipinas Live	Second round eliminations to Finals
Badminton		—N/a	Pilipinas Live	Selected eliminations to Finals
Table tennis	Collegiate	—N/a	Pilipinas Live	Finals only
Beach volleyball	Collegiate	—N/a	Pilipinas Live	Playoffs to Finals
Cheerdance		One Sports; UAAP Varsity Channel	Pilipinas Live	—N/a
Baseball	Men's	—N/a	Pilipinas Live	Second round eliminations to Finals
Baseball	Boys'	—N/a	Pilipinas Live	Second round eliminations to Finals
Softball		—N/a	Pilipinas Live	Finals only
Tennis	Collegiate	—N/a	Pilipinas Live	Playoffs to Finals
3x3 basketball		UAAP Varsity Channel	Pilipinas Live	Day 2 to Finals
Streetdance		One Sports; UAAP Varsity Channel	Pilipinas Live	—N/a

== See also ==
- NCAA Season 101
