= UAAP Varsity Channel =

Philippine collegiate sports channel

- Country: Philippines
- Broadcast area: Nationwide
- Network: TV5; One Sports; RPTV

Programming
- Languages: English (main); Filipino (secondary)
- Picture format: 720p/1080i HDTV (downscaled to 16:9 480i for the SDTV feed)

Ownership
- Owner: Cignal TV (MediaQuest Holdings); University Athletic Association of the Philippines
- Sister channels: NBA TV Philippines; One PH; One News; Kapatid Channel; One Sports+; PBA Rush; NCAA NXT

History
- Launched: September 8, 2021; 5 years ago

Links
- Website: CIGNAL TV - UAAP Varsity Channel HD

Availability

Terrestrial
- Cignal TV Nationwide: Channel 263
- SatLite Nationwide: Channel 55

Streaming media
- Cignal Play: Watch live (Philippines only)
- iWant: Watch live (International only)

The UAAP Varsity Channel is a Philippine collegiate sports channel owned by Cignal TV in partnership with University Athletic Association of the Philippines. It is the official broadcast channel of the said athletic league which airs different sporting events.

== History ==
On October 23, 2020, Cignal TV formally signed a broadcast agreement with the University Athletic Association of the Philippines (UAAP) for the coverage rights of every UAAP sporting events on TV5 and One Sports, in addition to a new dedicated channel on the Cignal service.

On September 8, 2021, Cignal TV formally launched the UAAP Varsity Channel at 4:00pm (Philippine Time) with an archive footage of the 65th season's men's basketball finals in 2002 between longtime rivals Ateneo Blue Eagles and De La Salle Green Archers.

On May 4, 2022, UAAP Varsity Channel was made available through iWantTFC (later as iWant) for international viewers.

== Programming and features ==
The UAAP Varsity Channel covers selected niche collegiate sporting events during their final matches (badminton, beach volleyball, baseball, and softball) in addition to its primary events (basketball, volleyball, cheerdance competition, and football). Aside from live coverage, the channel also airs its own original supplementary programming as well as archived games under the UAAP Classics banner.

=== Currently aired programs ===
==== Regular ====
- Basketball (collegiate and high school)
- Volleyball (collegiate and high school)
- Football (collegiate and high school)
- Cheerdance
- Streetdance (collegiate and high school)

==== Special ====
- Baseball
- Softball (Finals only)
- Beach Volleyball (Final Four, Finals only)
- Badminton (Finals only)
- Table Tennis (Finals only)
- Esports
- Fencing
- 3x3 Basketball
- Ballroom Formation (via Facebook page)

==== Supplamental ====
- Glory Days
- School Spirit
- The Bounce

== See also ==
- University Athletic Association of the Philippines
- NBA TV Philippines
- S+A (defunct)
- Balls (defunct)
- Liga (defunct)
- ABS-CBN Sports (dissolve)
- One Sports (division)
- One Sports
- PBA Rush
- Hyper (defunct)
