= University Athletic Association of the Philippines =

Collegiate athletic association of eight universities in Metro Manila, Philippines

- Current season, competition or edition: UAAP Season 89
- Logo as of UAAP Season 89 (Note: The current logo was first used in Season 84 in 2022, but the arrangement of colors in the logo changes depending on the season's host. In Season 89, the host is Far Eastern University, hence its colors were placed in the topmost portion.)
- Founded: 1938; 88 years ago
- Director: Rene Saguisag Jr.
- President: Mark Molina
- No. of teams: 8 (+4 guest teams in 9 events)
- Country: Philippines
- Venue: Metro Manila
- Most titles: Collegiate division: UST Growling Tigers (49 titles) High school division: UST Tiger Cubs (25 titles)
- Broadcasters: One Sports; UAAP Varsity Channel
- Streaming partner: YouTube
- Related competitions: Philippine Collegiate Champions League; Shakey's Super League; Philippine University Games
- Website: uaap.org

The University Athletic Association of the Philippines (UAAP), established in 1938, is an athletic association of eight Metro Manila universities in the Philippines. The eight-member schools are Adamson University (AdU), Ateneo de Manila University, (Note: Since 2017, Ateneo de Manila University is the only member school that does not use an acronym for official communications and graphics, according to their branding guide.) De La Salle University (DLSU), Far Eastern University (FEU), National University (NU), University of the East (UE), University of the Philippines Diliman (UP), and the University of Santo Tomas (UST).

Varsity teams from these universities compete annually in the league's multiple sports categories to vie for the overall championship title, namely, 3x3 basketball, athletics, badminton, baseball, basketball, beach volleyball, standard & blitz chess, fencing, football, judo, softball, swimming, table tennis, taekwondo kyorugi & poomsae, tennis, and volleyball. Meanwhile other events not scoring towards the overall championship includes cheerdance, esports, golf, and street dance.

== History ==
In 1924, seeing the need to organize collegiate sports and set general athletic policies, Dr. Regino Ylanan (the University of the Philippines Physical Education Director) met with representatives of Ateneo de Manila, De La Salle College, San Beda College, National University, University of Manila, University of Santo Tomas, and Institute of Accounts (now Far Eastern University) to discuss possibilities of forming an athletic organization, which eventually became the National Collegiate Athletic Association (NCAA).

In 1930, the University of the Philippines sponsored an experimental meet of the "Big Three" of the league (NU, UP, UST) on basketball, football, baseball, volleyball, swimming, athletics, boxing, and tennis.

The following year in 1931, the NCAA Board of Directors divided the meet into three divisions to put competition on a fairer basis and to stimulate athletics among a greater number.

In March 1932, NU, UP, and UST formally seceded from the NCAA. Led by UP's Candido C. Bartolome, NU's Leon Tirol and UST's Fr. Silvestre Sancho, OP, the move was made to put competitions on equal footing, to increase amateur athletic competitions and to separate the universities from the college members of the league. On April 6, the "Big Three League" was born. On August 14, the "Big Three" Association was inaugurated with a meet that starts with basketball. Other events were baseball, football, volleyball, relays, athletics, swimming and tennis.

In 1935, UP did not participate in the "Big Three League" because of mass intramurals at the state university. NU and UST held the meet with FEU (formerly Institute of Accounts) taking UP's place.

On September 27, 1938, the University of the Philippines Alumni Association and the Philippine Amateur Athletic Federation (PAAF), then the highest sports body in the country, encouraged the original "Big Three League" and FEU to form a permanent sports association, thus the University Athletic Association of the Philippines was established. Events included were basketball, baseball, football, women's volleyball, swimming and athletics. UP bagged three titles (baseball, volleyball, athletics). UST topped in football and swimming and FEU triumphed in basketball.

In 1941, the outbreak of World War II hindered the staging of the 1941–42 UAAP with UST failing to complete its term. The UAAP competition was not held from 1942 to 1946 due to the Japanese occupation of the country which resulted in the closure of educational institutions. The UAAP competition resumed in 1947.

In 1952, University of the East, Adamson University, Manila Central University, and University of Manila were granted two-year probationary membership to the UAAP. After the two-year probationary period, UE and MCU were accepted as regular members in 1954. MCU remained until its pull-out in 1962. The other two universities (Adamson and UM) were dropped from the UAAP due to their inability to comply with league requirements.

In 1970, Adamson University reapplied for admission to the league with a two-year probationary period and in 1974, Adamson successfully hosted the 1974–75 athletic season, paving the way for its permanent membership into the league.

In 1978, the UAAP admitted Ateneo de Manila University into the league while De La Salle University joined in 1986.

In 2020, the 2019–20 competition was initially intended to end in May that year. However, the competition abruptly ended early in April due to the outbreak of COVID-19 pandemic. Because of the ongoing pandemic, the planned 2020–21 tournament was cancelled, the first in peacetime. The league resumed the tournament on March 26, 2022 with its 84th season.

On August 20, 2024, the UAAP announced a proposal for a new 6,000-capacity indoor arena tentatively named the "Home of the UAAP". The proposed venue would be located in Pasig and is planned to open in 2027, in time for the association's 90th season. The arena will be constructed on a 1.8-hectare site across from the Bridgetowne estate, in partnership with Akari Lighting & Technology Corporation. Groundbreaking for the arena commenced on October 24, 2025. The planned seating capacity was also increased to over 8,000, and the arena will also be open to other leagues such as the PBA, PVL, and NCAA.

== Logo ==
The UAAP seal used from 1986 to 2021.

The previous UAAP logo features the university colors of the eight member-schools of the league in a circular formation. It also bears the year when the league was established, 1938, in the center.

The seal changes every season where the university colors of the season host is placed on the very top. Nonetheless, the arrangement of the colors never changes.

The colors of the National University (blue and gold), Far Eastern University (green and gold), University of Santo Tomas (gold and white), and the University of the Philippines (green and maroon), come first counter-clockwise. These are followed by the colors of the University of the East (red and white), Adamson University (navy blue and white), De La Salle University (green and white), and the Ateneo de Manila University (sky blue and white). The arrangement of the school colors is based from their admission in the UAAP (except for Ateneo de Manila University and De La Salle University's colors).

Prior to the start of UAAP Season 84 in March 2022, the league unveiled its new logo on December 17, 2021. The new logo was inspired by the Philippine traditional native sport sipa. Though the school colors arrangement was followed in reverse Season 84 (the season that the UAAP adopted the current logo), the arrangement of school colors still changes every season beginning with Season 85. The host school's colors is placed at the topmost "sipa" streak.

== Member schools ==
The following are the member schools of the league:

| Colors | School | Location | Founded | Joined | Type | Collegiate division | High school division |
|---|---|---|---|---|---|---|---|
| | Adamson University | Manila | 1932 | 1970 (Note: Adamson first joined the UAAP in 1952 and stayed for one season.) | Private (Vincentian) | Soaring Falcons, Lady Falcons, Baby Falcons and Lady Baby Falcons | |
| | Ateneo de Manila University | Quezon City | 1859 | 1978 | Private (Jesuit) | Blue Eagles | |
| | De La Salle University | Manila | 1911 | 1986 | Private (Lasallian) | Green Archers and Lady Archers | —N/a |
| | De La Salle Santiago Zobel School | Muntinlupa | 1911 | 1986 | Private (Lasallian) | —N/a | Junior Archers and Lady Junior Archers |
| | Far Eastern University | Multiple (Note: University has several campuses, of which the one in Manila is the flagship.) | 1928 | 1938 | Private | Tamaraws and Lady Tamaraws | —N/a |
| | Far Eastern University–Diliman | Quezon City | 1928 | 2005 (Note: The defunct FEU Boys High School and FEU Girls High School represented FEU in the Juniors division before 2005. The two high schools were established in 1933.) | Private | —N/a | Baby Tamaraws |
| | National University | Multiple | 1900 | 1938 | Private | Bulldogs, Lady Bulldogs, Bullpups and Lady Bullpups | |
| | National University Nazareth School | Multiple | 1900 | 2005 | Private | Bulldogs, Lady Bulldogs, Bullpups and Lady Bullpups | |
| | University of the East | Multiple | 1946 | 1952 | Private | Red Warriors and Lady Warriors | Junior Warriors and Lady Junior Warriors |
| | University of the Philippines Diliman | Quezon City | 1908 | 1938 | Public | Fighting Maroons | —N/a |
| | University of the Philippines Integrated School | Quezon City | 1908 | 1938 | Public | —N/a | Junior Fighting Maroons |
| | University of Santo Tomas | Manila | 1611 | 1938 | Private (Dominican) | UST Growling Tigers, Tigresses, Tiger Cubs and Tigress Cubs | |

=== Guest schools ===
Since UAAP Season 87, the league has signed memorandums of agreement for notable high school programs to join various events as guest teams. The Southridge Admirals have participated in five events since 2025, namely boys' football, swimming, baseball, tennis, and fencing, while the Claret Red Roosters rounded out the participating schools in boys' football.

| Colors | School | Location | Founded | Years Active | High school division | | Guest Membership |
| Colors | School | Location | Founded | Years Active | Boys | Girls | Guest Membership |
|---|---|---|---|---|---|---|---|
| | Claret School of Quezon City | Quezon City | 1967 | 2025–present | Red Roosters | —N/a | Boys' football |
| | PAREF Southridge School | Muntinlupa | 1979 | 2025–present | Admirals | —N/a | Boys' swimming, baseball, football, tennis, and fencing |
| | National Academy of Sports | Capas, Tarlac | 2020 | 2026–present | Excel Lions | | Boys and Girls' table tennis, swimming, athletics, judo, and taekwondo |
| | University of the Philippines Cebu | Cebu City | 1918 | 2026–present | Junior Fighting Maroons | —N/a | Boys' football |

=== Former full member schools ===
| School | Location | Founded | Joined | Left | Type | Current association |
|---|---|---|---|---|---|---|
| Manila Central University | Caloocan | 1904 | 1952 | 1962 | Private | UCAL |
| University of Manila | Manila | 1913 | 1952 | 1954 | Private | —N/a |

== Sports ==
Locations of the UAAP schools and tournament venues within Metro Manila

Member universities compete in multiple sports. Basketball, being the most popular sport in the Philippines, is the most watched and most supported among all the sports. Volleyball and cheerdance are also equally considered marquee events in the UAAP due to growing respective fanbases and media coverage in the country. All of these sports have Men's and Women's divisions, with the exception of baseball, in which only men participate, and softball, which is for women only.

The following sports have a high school division, in which the associated high schools of the universities participate: volleyball, table tennis, chess, swimming, fencing, and athletics have Boys' and Girls' divisions. Meanwhile, baseball and football have a Boys' division only. Basketball staged Girls' division competitions starting Season 82 albeit as demo sport only. Junior High School Basketball was introduced as a demo sport in Season 86.

Esports made its debut in Season 87. Rapid and Blitz Chess were also introduced as demonstration sports in Season 87. Golf is the latest sport that was added by the league and made its debut as a demonstration sport in Season 88.

== Sports calendar ==
Beginning with Season 78 in 2015, the league shifted its sports schedule start from July to September because of the change in the academic calendars of most of its member universities. In 2024, the calendar shifted to start by August with the debut of esports in Season 87. Esports would later be moved to the second semester in Season 88.

| Semester | Month | Sport (Division) | Venue(s) | Location |
|---|---|---|---|---|
| First | September | Basketball (Collegiate, 16U) | SM Mall of Asia Arena | Pasay |
| First | September | Basketball (Collegiate, 16U) | Smart Araneta Coliseum | Quezon City |
| First | September | Basketball (Collegiate, 16U) | UST Quadricentennial Pavilion | Manila |
| First | September | Basketball (Collegiate, 16U) | Ateneo Blue Eagle Gym | Quezon City |
| First | September | Football (Collegiate) | UP Diliman Football Stadium | Quezon City |
| First | September | Football (Collegiate) | Rizal Memorial Stadium | Manila |
| First | September | Volleyball (High School) | Ateneo Blue Eagle Gym | Quezon City |
| First | September | Volleyball (High School) | Adamson University Gym | Manila |
| First | September | Volleyball (High School) | Paco Arena | Manila |
| First | September | Volleyball (High School) | FEU Diliman Gym | Quezon City |
| First | September | Standard Chess | Adamson University Gym | Manila |
| First | October | Badminton (Collegiate) | Rizal Memorial Badminton Hall | Manila |
| First | November | Athletics | New Clark City Athletics Stadium | Capas |
| First | November | Swimming | New Clark City Aquatic Center | Capas |
| First | November | Table Tennis | Amoranto Sports Complex | Quezon City |
| First | November | Beach Volleyball (Collegiate) | Sands at SM By The Bay | Pasay |
| First | December | Cheerdance (Coed) | SM Mall of Asia Arena | Pasay |
| Second | January | Baseball (High School) | Rizal Memorial Baseball Stadium | Manila |
| Second | January | Basketball (19U) | Ateneo Blue Eagle Gym | Quezon City |
| Second | January | Basketball (19U) | Filoil EcoOil Centre | San Juan |
| Second | January | Basketball (19U) | Ninoy Aquino Stadium | Manila |
| Second | January | Basketball (19U) | Adamson University Gym | Manila |
| Second | January | Football (High School) | UP Diliman Football Stadium | Quezon City |
| Second | January | Football (High School) | Rizal Memorial Stadium | Manila |
| Second | February | Beach Volleyball (High School) | Sands at SM By The Bay | Pasay |
| Second | February | Volleyball (Collegiate) | SM Mall of Asia Arena | Pasay |
| Second | February | Volleyball (Collegiate) | Smart Araneta Coliseum | Quezon City |
| Second | February | Volleyball (Collegiate) | UST Quadricentennial Pavilion | Manila |
| Second | February | Volleyball (Collegiate) | Filoil EcoOil Centre | San Juan |
| Second | February | Tennis | CSA Bulacan Tennis Court | San Jose del Monte |
| Second | February | Softball | Rizal Memorial Baseball Stadium | Manila |
| Second | February | Baseball (Collegiate) | Rizal Memorial Baseball Stadium | Manila |
| Second | March | Fencing | Makati Coliseum | Makati |
| Second | April | Blitz Chess | Adamson University Gym | Manila |
| Second | April | Judo | Rizal Memorial Coliseum | Manila |
| Second | April | Taekwondo | Rizal Memorial Coliseum | Manila |
| Second | May | 3x3 basketball | Ayala Malls Manila Bay | Parañaque |
| Second | May | Streetdance (Coed) | Ateneo Blue Eagle Gym | Quezon City |
| Second | May | Golf | Tagaytay Midlands Golf Club | Tagaytay |
| Second | August | Esports | MVP Studios | Mandaluyong |

== Rivalries ==
=== Adamson–Ateneo rivalry ===
School colors of
Adamson and Ateneo

Adamson University and Ateneo de Manila University did not have a well-known rivalry, but Adamson ended a 13-year, 29-match losing streak against Ateneo in the UAAP Season 74 basketball tournaments when they defeated Ateneo in the last game of the elimination round and denied the Blue Eagles of a thrice-to-beat advantage in the semifinals. Their rivalry, also referred to as the "Battle of the Birds", began in 2010 when they met in the finals of the Philippine Collegiate Championship League, a year before Adamson denied Ateneo a sweep of the elimination rounds of the UAAP Season 74 men's basketball tournament.

While Adamson and Ateneo's UAAP men's basketball rivalry was rekindled by their semifinal matchup in UAAP Season 85, both notably competed in the playoffs of women's volleyball in UAAP Seasons 75, 76 and 84, with Ateneo prevailing in all mentioned matchups and, in the latter case, ousting Adamson from contention for the Final Four round. In 2023, however, Adamson pulled off an upset by defeating the defending champions, Ateneo, during their matchup in the first round of the eliminations, before facing off against each other in the fourth seed playoff. Ateneo eventually prevailed in the do-or-die playoff to extend their UAAP men's basketball semifinals appearance streak to its ninth season. In 2024, Adamson eliminated eighth-seeded Ateneo during the latter's weakest tournament performance since clinching the first ever season sweep in the Final Four era of UAAP men's basketball in 2019 to force their third consecutive do-or-die playoff for the fourth seed against University of the East, which it eventually won to enter the semifinals.

=== Adamson–UP rivalry ===
School colors of
Adamson and UP

While both Adamson University and the University of the Philippines jointly figured multiple times in the softball championship rounds since the tournament's Final Four playoffs format introduction in the UAAP in 1995, the rivalry gained mainstream attention when Adamson had the twice-to-beat advantage against UP in the UAAP Season 81 men's basketball semifinals. During that season, UP and Adamson were the only remaining schools that had yet to compete in the men's basketball championship round in the UAAP in the Final Four era. After losing twice in the elimination rounds, UP defeated Adamson in two games, including the overtime in the do-or-die match, to pose their first appearance in the UAAP Finals in any of the league's marquee events in the 21st century.

=== Ateneo–La Salle rivalry ===
School colors of
Ateneo and La Salle

The rivalry between Ateneo de Manila University and De La Salle University, widely regarded as the Philippines' foremost collegiate rivalry for decades, has resulted in sold-out games (especially in men's basketball and women's volleyball, the latter of which both schools hold the current all-time record for the longest joint UAAP Finals appearance from 2012 to 2017) that attract several public figures in attendance, including politicians, movie stars, and foreign diplomats. It is also the foremost school rivalry in the UAAP since La Salle joined the UAAP from the NCAA in 1986. However, the rivalry dates back to the time when both schools were playing in the National Collegiate Athletic Association from 1924 until Ateneo transferred to the UAAP in 1978.

=== Ateneo–UP rivalry ===
School colors of
Ateneo and UP

A rivalry between the Ateneo de Manila University and the University of the Philippines, the country's two highest-ranked academic institutions for decades, existed even before the formation of the NCAA and UAAP. Students of UP would troop from Padre Faura to the Ateneo campus in Intramuros to play basketball with the Ateneans, which led to Ateneo forming the first organized cheering squad and pep band in the Philippines and what is now known as the Blue Babble Battalion. This would later become UAAP's "Battle of Katipunan" when both universities transferred to their respective campuses along Katipunan Avenue in Quezon City, and when the two schools began competing in the UAAP.

While both schools featured in the UAAP championship games for other events like men's football, the now-dubbed "Battle of Katipunan" garnered nationwide attention for the first time in UAAP history when third-seeded UP Fighting Maroons, after ending a 21-year long drought of Final Four appearance, overcame second-seeded Adamson Soaring Falcons' twice-to-beat advantage to advance to the finals for the first time since their 1986 championship to face defending champions Ateneo Blue Eagles in men's basketball in 2018. Ateneo won the championship in Season 81 in 2018 via sweep, and Season 85 in 2022 via do-or-die game. The Fighting Maroons ended the Blue Eagles' all-time UAAP men's basketball record 39-game win streak, and won the title via do-or-die game in Season 84 in 2022, before defeating them in the Final Four the following year to end Ateneo's six consecutive seasons of UAAP Finals appearances and podium finishes from 2016 to 2022.

=== FEU–La Salle rivalry ===
School colors of
FEU and La Salle

The rivalry was sparked after the UAAP Season 54 Men's Basketball Finals in 1991 when La Salle's final game win was protested by FEU after a Green Archer was admitted into the playing court after being disqualified. The UAAP Board upheld the protest and ordered the replay. The protest was taken up by FIBA, the highest international governing body in basketball. FIBA and the Basketball Association of the Philippines (BAP) supported La Salle's stand on the issue. La Salle did not show up, claiming to have won legitimately, and FEU was awarded the trophy by default. La Salle then had their victory parade pass through all UAAP schools – when they passed through the FEU campus, the motorcade was bombarded with debris.

The rivalry between FEU and La Salle has produced several momentous scenes and drama in UAAP Basketball history. FEU and La Salle faced each other in the UAAP Finals in 2004 and 2005, with the Green Archers prevailing in 2004 and the Tamaraws winning the year afterwards. However, La Salle's 2004 championship was forfeited and handed to FEU instead after a controversial ineligibility issue, which also caused La Salle's suspension in 2006.

FEU and La Salle have met seven times in the finals of UAAP women's volleyball, most recently in 2018 when La Salle swept FEU en route to their 11th overall championship. La Salle has won three crowns over FEU in their head-to-head finals matchups, while FEU, having the most number of volleyball championship titles in the country (with a total of 29 titles in the league), has won four crowns over La Salle, most recently in Season 65 (2002). La Salle holds the record of having the longest streaks of appearances in the volleyball tournaments in the UAAP Final Four, ongoing since 2009, and in the UAAP Finals, lasting for 10 consecutive years from 2009 to 2018.

=== FEU–UE rivalry ===
School colors of
FEU and UE

The rivalry between Far Eastern University and University of the East started in the 1950s. Tagged as the "Battle of the East", these two schools, along with UST, have the winningest basketball squads in the league (FEU having won 20 basketball championships while UE having won 18 titles).

=== La Salle–NU rivalry ===
School colors of
La Salle and NU

Since 2022, the De La Salle Lady Spikers and NU Lady Bulldogs have become frequent finalists in UAAP Women's Volleyball, having faced each other in the finals four times in five years. In UAAP Season 84, the NU Lady Bulldogs swept the elimination rounds and faced the De La Salle Lady Spikers in the finals. The Lady Bulldogs swept the series to win their first title since Season 19, ending a 65-year drought with a perfect 16–0 record. The following season, the Lady Spikers swept the Lady Bulldogs en route to their 12th UAAP championship title. Both teams would meet again in the finals for the third time in Season 87, where the Lady Bulldogs successfully defended their title after reclaiming it the previous season. In Season 88, the De La Salle Lady Spikers became the third team after the Ateneo Lady Eagles in Season 77 and the NU Lady Bulldogs in Season 84 to sweep the tournament with a flawless 16–0 record, dethroning the Lady Bulldogs in the process to win their 13th championship title.

=== La Salle–UP rivalry ===
School colors of
La Salle and UP

Since 2023, the De La Salle Green Archers and the UP Fighting Maroons have faced each other for three straight years in the UAAP Men's Basketball Finals, starting a new rivalry in the UAAP.

In Season 86, the Green Archers went on to win their 10th UAAP championship against the Fighting Maroons in three games during their first ever head-to-head UAAP Finals (and second overall playoffs stage) matchup. The third game of the finals drew a record 25,192 fans in attendance at the Smart Araneta Coliseum.

In Season 87, La Salle was dethroned after losing to UP in three games in the championship series. The Fighting Maroons won their fourth UAAP championship title. The winner-take-all game between the Fighting Maroons and the Green Archers drew a record 25,248 fans inside the Smart Araneta Coliseum, resetting their joint previous record the preceding year to become the second largest in-venue attendance in any event in UAAP history after NU defeated UP and UST during the 2015 Cheerdance Competition.

In Season 88, the UP Fighting Maroons and the De La Salle Green Archers emerged as the second and fourth seed teams respectively, heading into the Final Four. UP eliminated the third-seeded UST Growling Tigers in one game, while La Salle swept the top-seeded NU Bulldogs to return to the finals to face the Fighting Maroons for the third consecutive year. The De La Salle Green Archers dethroned the UP Fighting Maroons during the best-of-three series, having lost Game 2 but won Games 1 and 3 to claim their 11th UAAP championship. The Green Archers became the second fourth seed team to win the title after the NU Bulldogs from UAAP Season 77 in 2014. This also marked the fifth consecutive season where the UAAP Finals series reached a do-or-die third game – the longest such streak so far in the league's Final Four history.

=== La Salle–UST rivalry ===
School colors of
La Salle and UST

The De La Salle Green Archers and UST Growling Tigers were known for their numerous basketball championship matches in the 1990s with UST winning four straight titles from 1993 to 1996, the last three of which were at the expense of the Green Archers at the UAAP Finals. In 1997, La Salle eliminated UST in the semifinals to deny the Growling Tigers of a fifth consecutive championship title. In 1999, La Salle defeated the Growling Tigers to win the basketball crown and achieved their own 4-peat championship streak from 1998 to 2001. Their basketball rivalry diminished in latter years because of UST's decline.

It became a celebrated rivalry in women's volleyball, as the De La Salle Lady Spikers and the UST Golden Tigresses met three times in the championship of the Shakey's V-League tournament. UST won the first and La Salle winning the latter two. The Tigresses have won six championships while the Lady Spikers have three under their belt.

The women's volleyball rivalry was carried over to the UAAP. The De La Salle Lady Spikers and the UST Golden Tigresses met in the UAAP Finals for two consecutive seasons – Season 72 (won by UST) and Season 73 (won by La Salle). While UST struggled in the tournament during the mid-2010s, both schools met in the semifinals in Seasons 79 and since Season 85, where La Salle won in Seasons 79, 85 and 87, and UST won in Seasons 81 and 86. Notably, in Season 81, UST ended La Salle's decade-long streak of finals appearances (running from 2009 to 2018). It was the longest in the Final Four era of UAAP volleyball.

=== UP–UST rivalry ===
School colors of
UP and UST

The cheerdance rivalry between the University of the Philippines and the University of Santo Tomas has been one of the most productive rivalries in any event in UAAP history. Since the inception of the cheerdance, UP and UST possess the best winning records, dominating the top podium finishes between the 1990s and early 2010s, including consecutive joint podium finishes by both schools from 1999 to 2008. Both schools' pep squads are famous for their stunts and high-energy performances. UST has won eight cheerdance titles which included five straight victories from 2002 to 2006, while UP has won eight cheerdance titles and completed podium finishes for a total of 20 years, the longest such streak for the event. Since 2010, the rivalry turned into a friendly one as both UP and UST supporters cheered their school cheers during the announcement of winners.

Although matches between these universities have not reached a rivalry status in sporting events outside of cheerdance, the battle between their respective teams may be referred to as "Separation of Church and State". UST is the sole pontifical university in the country wherein Pope Pius XII gave it the title "The Catholic University of the Philippines". UP, on the other hand, has been declared by the Philippine government as the country's "national university".

The popularity of the rivalry between the two universities' cheerdance teams diminished in the late 2010s as a result of the rise of National University and Adamson University. It gained greater prominence when the two teams competed against each other in the UAAP men's basketball semifinals in 2019, 2024 and 2025. The Growling Tigers overcame the twice-to-beat Fighting Maroons in the former, while the Fighting Maroons won over the Growling Tigers in the latter two to enter the UAAP Finals.

== UAAP championships ==
- Overall
- 3x3 basketball (since 2018)
- Athletics (since 1938)
- Badminton (since 1995)
- Baseball (since 1938)
- Basketball (since 1938)
- Beach volleyball (since 2006)
- Cheerdance (since 1994)
- Chess (since 1978)
- Esports (since 2024)
- Fencing (since 1997)
- Football (since 1938)
- Formation dance (2016–2023)
- Golf (since 2026)
- Judo (since 1995)
- Softball (since 1953)
- Street dance (since 2011)
- Swimming (since 1938)
- Table tennis (since 1978)
- Taekwondo (since 1994)
- Tennis (since 1949)
- Volleyball (since 1938)

== Media ==
=== BBC and IBC era (1975–1989) ===
The UAAP's first media was with the Banahaw Broadcasting Corporation (BBC) from 1975 to 1984. The Intercontinental Broadcasting Corporation (IBC) also had a coinciding deal from 1979 to 1989.

=== Silverstar era (1989–1999) ===
In 1989, Radio Philippines Network (RPN) began their partnership with the UAAP. Two years later in 1991, Louis Kierulf agreed to a deal with the UAAP to put their entire basketball championship on television through Silverstar Communications. Silverstar would continue broadcasting the UAAP until 1999, during which the broadcasts moved to People's Television Network (PTV) in 1994.

=== ABS-CBN era (2000–2020) ===
In 2000, ABS-CBN, through their sports division, became the UAAP's next media partner for the new millennium.

Studio 23 first broadcast the games from 2000 to 2013 before getting replaced by its successor S+A for the rest of the deal. ABS-CBN also broadcast select games in the 2000s and again from 2010 to 2020. Other channels from the network that also broadcast games were Balls (2009–2015) and Liga (2018–2020).

The ABS-CBN deal ended in 2020 as a result of the network's shutdown.

=== Cignal era (2020–present) ===
In search of a new media partner, the association entered a deal with Cignal TV to broadcast games through One Sports. The new deal also included the establishment of the UAAP Varsity Channel, a dedicated channel for the association similar to the Philippine Basketball Association's PBA Rush, which is also owned by Cignal. The initial five-year deal was signed in 2020 during the cancelled Season 83 (2020–21) and took into effect beginning with the following Season 84 (2021–22). In 2025, the two parties signed a five-year extension, meaning that the partnership is currently set to expire after Season 93 (2030–31).

TV5 also broadcast a selection of games in Season 84, while Cignal Play, and One Sports YouTube channel serves as the league's streaming partner. RPTV also broadcast the Finals games in Season 87.

== See also ==
- National Collegiate Athletic Association (Philippines)
