= UAAP Esports Tournament =

Esports tournament

- Sport: Esports
- Founded: 2024
- No. of teams: 8
- Country: Philippines
- Most recent champions: NBA 2K / eFIBA – NU (2026); Valorant – NU (2026); Mobile Legends: Bang Bang – NU (2026)
- Most titles: Overall – La Salle and NU (3 each); NBA 2K / eFIBA – Ateneo (2); Valorant – La Salle (2); Mobile Legends: Bang Bang – UE, La Salle, and NU (1 each)
- Broadcasters: One Sports; UAAP Varsity Channel; Cignal Play

The UAAP Esports Tournament is an esports competition among member-schools of the University Athletic Association of the Philippines. Its first edition was held in 2024 at the Areté Creativity and Innovation hub within the Ateneo de Manila University.

It consists of three titles: sports simulation NBA 2K for console, first-person tactical hero shooter Valorant for PC, and multiplayer online battle arena Mobile Legends: Bang Bang for mobile. The competition is currently only an exhibition sport or formally a special event; thus, it has no bearing on the overall standing.

In 2026, the NBA 2K tournament was promoted and branded as the eFIBA x UAAP eGilas Talent Discovery Tournament presented by the Samahang Basketbol ng Pilipinas.

Since its first iteration, all eight UAAP member-schools joined.

== Participants ==
School	Team
Adamson University (AdU)	Adamson Soaring Falcons (Adamson Falcons: 2024)
Ateneo de Manila University (ADM)	Ateneo Blue Eagles; Competes as Loyola Gaming (LG) outside the UAAP
De La Salle University (DLSU)	De La Salle Green Aces (Viridis Arcus Esports: 2024); Competes as Viridis Arcus Esports (VA) outside the UAAP
Far Eastern University (FEU)	FEU Tamaraws (FEU Tamaraws Esports: 2024); Competes as Tams FX outside the UAAP
National University (NU)	NU Bulldogs
University of the East (UE)	UE Red Warriors (UE Zenith Warriors: 2024); Competes as UE Zenith Esports (UEZE) outside the UAAP
University of the Philippines (UP)	UP Fighting Maroons
University of Santo Tomas (UST)	UST Teletigers (UST Teletigers Esports Club: 2024)

== Results ==
=== NBA 2K / eFIBA ===
Season	Event host	Venue	Finals			Third-place game			
Season	Event host	Venue	Gold	Score	Silver	Bronze		Score	Fourth place
2024	Ateneo	Doreen Black Box Theater	Ateneo	77–75; 89–93; 74–63	La Salle	UST (Note: Eryx Delos Reyes (UST A) won the bronze medal match over fellow Teletiger, Daemiel Argame (UST B). The match featured athletes from the same school due to the tournament's double group format.)		72–63; 71–57	UST
2025	Ateneo	Gateway 2 Quantum Skyview	Ateneo	77–71 (OT); 69–59	UST	La Salle	Adamson	No third place game held	
2026	N/A	MVP Studios	NU	56–51; 74–56	UST	La Salle	Adamson	No third place game held	

=== Valorant ===
Season	Event host	Venue	Finals			Third-place game			
Season	Event host	Venue	Gold	Score	Silver	Bronze		Score	Fourth place
2024	Ateneo	Hyundai Hall	La Salle	13–5; 13–7	UST	Ateneo	UP	No third place game held (Note: A bronze medal match was supposed to be held for all tournaments in Season 87. However, due to technical issues during the tournament that led to a one day delay from match suspensions, the UAAP board decided to forego the third place game and award both semifinalists.)	
2025	Ateneo	Gateway 2 Quantum Skyview	La Salle	13–10; 13–10	FEU	Ateneo	UP	No third place game held	
2026	N/A	MVP Studios	NU	7–13; 14–12; 13–8	Adamson	UE	UP	No third place game held	

=== Mobile Legends: Bang Bang ===
Season	Event host	Venue	Finals			Third-place game			
Season	Event host	Venue	Gold	Score	Silver	Bronze		Score	Fourth place
2024	Ateneo	Hyundai Hall	UE	2–0	UST	FEU	NU	No third place game held	
2025	Ateneo	Gateway 2 Quantum Skyview	La Salle	2–1	NU	UST	FEU	No third place game held	
2026	N/A	MVP Studios	NU	2–1	La Salle	Adamson	UP	No third place game held	

== Finals MVP ==
=== NBA 2K ===
Season	Name	Team
2025	Luis Jovellanos	Ateneo

=== Valorant ===
Season	Name	Team
2025	Xavier Juan	La Salle

=== Mobile Legends: Bang Bang ===
Season	Name	Team
2025	Aaron Lim	La Salle

== Medal table ==
School	Rank			Total
School	1st place, gold medalist(s)	2nd place, silver medalist(s)	3rd place, bronze medalist(s)	Total
De La Salle University	3	2	2	7
National University	3	1	1	5
Ateneo de Manila University	2	–	2	4
University of the East	1	–	1	2
University of Santo Tomas	–	4	2	6
Adamson University	–	1	3	4
Far Eastern University	–	1	2	3
University of the Philippines	–	–	4	4
