= UAAP Ballroom Formation Competition =

Contest on dance sport

- Sport: Dancesport
- Founded: 2016
- No. of teams: 4 (in 2023)
- Country: Philippines
- Most recent champions: University of the Philippines (Latin, Standard, Latin Mixed)

The UAAP Ballroom Formation Competition is a contest on dance sport among member-schools of the University Athletic Association of the Philippines. Its first edition was held on 3 September 2016 in UST Quadricentennial Pavilion Arena.

It has two categories: the Latin division and the Standard division. The competition is only a special event sport; thus, it has no bearing on the overall standing.

In its first competition, seven out of all eight UAAP member-schools joined. University of the Philippines Ballroom Formation Team won both categories.

Latin Mixed was added for its third edition in UAAP Season 85 where UP claimed the first-ever title.

== Categories ==
- Latin division – Consisted of cha-cha-cha, rumba, and jive.
- Standard division – Consisted of waltz, tango, and quickstep.

== Participants ==
School	Team
Adamson University (AdU)	Adamson Ballroom Pep Club (2016); Adamson Dance Company (2023)
Ateneo de Manila University (ADMU)	Ateneo Dance Sport Club
De La Salle University (DLSU)	DLSU Ballroom Blitz
Far Eastern University (FEU)	FEU Dance Company – Ballroom Team
National University (NU)	NU Dancesport Company
University of the East (UE)	UE Warrior Dancesport Team
University of the Philippines (UP)	UP Ballroom Formation Team
University of Santo Tomas (UST)	UST Sinag Ballroom Dance Company

== Results ==
=== Latin division ===
Year	Season host	Venue	Champion	2nd place	3rd place	4th place	5th place	6th place	7th place	8th place	Ref.
2016	UST	UST Quadricentennial Pavilion; Manila	UP; 92.48	UST; 91.66	UE; 84.42						
2019	NU	UST Quadricentennial Pavilion; Manila	UP; 89.10	UST; 84.80	FEU; 74.40						
2023	Adamson	UST Quadricentennial Pavilion; Manila	UP; 88.20	FEU; 85.50	UST; 84.70						

=== Standard division ===
Year	Season host	Venue	Champion	2nd place	3rd place	4th place	5th place	6th place	7th place	8th place	Ref.
2016	UST	UST Quadricentennial Pavilion; Manila	UP; 94.30	UST; 91.10	La Salle; 87.00						
2019	NU	UST Quadricentennial Pavilion; Manila	UST; 89.10	UP; 85.20							
2023	Adamson	UST Quadricentennial Pavilion; Manila	UP; 80.40	UST; 76.20	Adamson; 75.90						

== See also ==
- UAAP Street Dance Competition
- NCAA Cheerleading Competition
- List of domestic club championship attendance: UAAP Cheerdance Competition in a global context.
