= UAAP swimming championships =

Swimming championship

University Athletic Association of the Philippines Swimming champions since 1938.

== UAAP swimming champions ==
UAAP Season	Men's	Women's	Boys'	Girls'
1 (1938–39)	University of Santo Tomas (1)	University of Santo Tomas (1)		
2 (1939–40)	University of the Philippines Diliman (1)	University of the Philippines Diliman (1)		
3 (1940–41)	University of the Philippines Diliman (2)	University of the Philippines Diliman (2)		
4 (1941–42)	Not held due to World War II			
5 (1942–43)	Not held due to World War II			
6 (1943–44)	Not held due to World War II			
7 (1944–45)	Not held due to World War II			
8 (1945–46)	Not held due to World War II			
9 (1946–47)	University of Santo Tomas (2)	University of Santo Tomas (2)		
10 (1947–48)	University of the Philippines Diliman (3)	University of the Philippines Diliman (3)		
11 (1948–49)	University of Santo Tomas (3)	University of Santo Tomas (3)		
12(1949–50)	University of Santo Tomas (4)	University of Santo Tomas (4)		
13 (1950–51)	Far Eastern University (1)	Far Eastern University (1)		
14 (1951–52)	Far Eastern University (2)	Far Eastern University (2)		
15 (1952–53)	National University (1)	National University (1)		
16 (1953–54)	University of Santo Tomas (5)	University of Santo Tomas (5)		
17 (1954–55)	University of Santo Tomas (6)	University of Santo Tomas (6)		
18 (1955–56)	Far Eastern University (3)	Far Eastern University (3)		
19 (1956–57)	University of Santo Tomas (7)	University of Santo Tomas (7)		
20 (1957–58)	University of Santo Tomas (8)	University of Santo Tomas (8)		
21 (1958–59)	University of Santo Tomas (9)	University of Santo Tomas (9)		
22 (1959–60)	University of Santo Tomas (10)	University of Santo Tomas (10)		
23 (1960–61)	University of Santo Tomas (11)	University of Santo Tomas (11)		
24 (1961–62)	University of Santo Tomas (12)	University of Santo Tomas (12)		
25 (1962–63)	University of Santo Tomas (13)	University of Santo Tomas (13)		
26 (1963–64)	University of Santo Tomas (14)	University of Santo Tomas (14)		
27 (1964–65)	University of Santo Tomas (15)	University of the Philippines Diliman (4)		
28 (1965–66)	University of Santo Tomas (16)	University of the Philippines Diliman (5)		
29 (1966–67)	University of Santo Tomas (17)	University of the Philippines Diliman (6)		
30 (1967–68)	University of Santo Tomas (18)	University of Santo Tomas (15)		
31 (1968–69)	Far Eastern University (4)	Far Eastern University (4)		
32 (1969–70)	University of the East (1)	University of the East (1)		
33 (1970–71)	University of Santo Tomas (19)	University of Santo Tomas (16)		
34 (1971–72)	University of the East (2)	University of the East (2)		
35 (1972–73)	University of the East (3)	University of the East (3)		
36 (1973–74)	University of Santo Tomas (20)	Far Eastern University (5)		
37 (1974–75)	University of Santo Tomas (21)	University of the East (4)		
38 (1975–76)	University of the East (4)	University of Santo Tomas (17)		
39 (1976–77)	University of Santo Tomas (22)	University of Santo Tomas (18)		
40 (1977–78)	University of Santo Tomas (23)	University of Santo Tomas (19)		
41 (1978–79)	University of Santo Tomas (24)	University of Santo Tomas (20)		
42 (1979–80)	University of Santo Tomas (25)	Far Eastern University (6)		
43 (1980–81)	University of the Philippines Diliman (4)	University of Santo Tomas (21)		
44 (1981–82)	University of the Philippines Diliman (5)	Far Eastern University (7)		
45 (1982–83)	Far Eastern University (5)	University of Santo Tomas (22)		
46 (1983–84)	Far Eastern University (6)	University of Santo Tomas (23)		
47 (1984–85)	Far Eastern University (7)	University of Santo Tomas (24)		
48 (1985–86)	University of Santo Tomas (26)	Far Eastern University (8)		
49 (1986–87)	University of Santo Tomas (27)	Far Eastern University (9)		
50 (1987–88)	University of Santo Tomas (28)	Far Eastern University (10)		
51 (1988–89)	De La Salle University (1)	University of the Philippines Diliman (7)		
52 (1989–90)	University of Santo Tomas (29)	University of Santo Tomas (25)		
53 (1990–91)	De La Salle University (2)	De La Salle University (1)		
54 (1991–92)	De La Salle University (3)	University of the Philippines Diliman (8)		
55 (1992–93)	De La Salle University (4)	University of Santo Tomas (26)		
56 (1993–94)	University of the Philippines Diliman (6)	University of the Philippines Diliman (9)		
57 (1994–95)	De La Salle University (5)	University of the Philippines Diliman (10)		
58 (1995–96)	De La Salle University (6)	University of the Philippines Diliman (11)		
59 (1996–97)	University of the Philippines Diliman (7)	De La Salle University (2)	University of Santo Tomas (1)	University of Santo Tomas (1)
60 (1997–98)	University of the Philippines Diliman (8)	University of the Philippines Diliman (12)		
61 (1998–99)	University of the Philippines Diliman (9)	University of the Philippines Diliman (13)	University of Santo Tomas (2)	University of Santo Tomas (2)
62 (1999–2000)	University of the Philippines Diliman (10)	University of the Philippines Diliman (14)		
63 (2000–2001)	De La Salle University (7)	University of Santo Tomas (27)	Ateneo de Manila University (1)	
64 (2001–2002)	De La Salle University (8)	University of Santo Tomas (28)		
65 (2002–2003)	De La Salle University (9)	De La Salle University (3)	University of Santo Tomas (3)	University of Santo Tomas (3)
66 (2003–2004)	University of the Philippines Diliman (11)	De La Salle University (4)	University of Santo Tomas (4)	University of Santo Tomas (4)
67 (2004–2005)	University of the Philippines Diliman (12)	University of Santo Tomas (29)	University of Santo Tomas (5)	University of Santo Tomas (5)
68 (2005–2006)	University of the Philippines Diliman (13)	University of Santo Tomas (30)	Ateneo de Manila University (2)	University of the East (1)
69 (2006-2007)	University of the Philippines Diliman (14)	University of Santo Tomas (31)	Ateneo de Manila University (3)	UP Integrated School (1)
70 (2007–2008)	University of the Philippines Diliman (15)	University of Santo Tomas (32)	Ateneo de Manila University (4)	UP Integrated School (2)
71 (2008–2009)	University of Santo Tomas (30)	Ateneo de Manila University (1)	Ateneo de Manila University (5)	University of Santo Tomas (6)
72 (2009–2010)	De La Salle University (10)	University of the Philippines Diliman (15)	Ateneo de Manila University (6)	University of Santo Tomas (7)
73 (2010–2011)	University of the Philippines Diliman (16)	University of the Philippines Diliman (16)	Ateneo de Manila University (7)	University of Santo Tomas (8)
74 (2011–2012)	De La Salle University (11)	University of the Philippines Diliman (17)	Ateneo de Manila University (8)	University of the East (2)
75 (2012–2013)	Ateneo de Manila University (1)	University of the Philippines Diliman (18)	Ateneo de Manila University (9)	University of the East (3)
76 (2013–2014)	University of the Philippines Diliman (17)	University of the Philippines Diliman (19)	Ateneo de Manila University (10)	University of the East (4)
77 (2014–2015)	Ateneo de Manila University (2)	Ateneo de Manila University (2)	Ateneo de Manila University (11)	University of Santo Tomas (9)
78 (2015–2016)	Ateneo de Manila University (3)	Ateneo de Manila University (3)	Ateneo de Manila University (12)	University of Santo Tomas (10)
79 (2016–2017)	Ateneo de Manila University (4)	University of the Philippines Diliman (20)	University of Santo Tomas (6)	De La Salle Zobel (1)
80 (2017–2018)	Ateneo de Manila University (5)	Ateneo de Manila University (4)	University of Santo Tomas (7)	De La Salle Zobel (2)
81 (2018–2019)	Ateneo de Manila University (6)	Ateneo de Manila University (5)	De La Salle Zobel (1)	De La Salle Zobel (3)
82 (2019–2020)	Ateneo de Manila University (7)	Ateneo de Manila University (6)	University of Santo Tomas (8)	University of Santo Tomas (11)
83 (2020–2021)	Cancelled due to COVID-19 pandemic			
84 (2021–2022)	Not held due to COVID-19 pandemic			
85 (2022–2023)	Ateneo de Manila University (8)	De La Salle University (5)	University of Santo Tomas (9)	University of Santo Tomas (12)
86 (2023–2024)	Ateneo de Manila University (9)	University of the Philippines Diliman (21)	University of Santo Tomas (10)	University of Santo Tomas (13)
87 (2024–2025)	Ateneo de Manila University (10)	Ateneo de Manila University (7)	University of Santo Tomas (11)	University of Santo Tomas (14)
88 (2025–2026)	Ateneo de Manila University (11)	University of the Philippines Diliman (22)	University of Santo Tomas (12)	University of Santo Tomas (15)

== Number of championships by school ==
- Note: The Juniors section is incomplete

University	Men's	Women's	Boys'	Girls'	Total	Last Championship
University of Santo Tomas	30	32	12	15	89	2025–26 (B&G)
University of the Philippines Diliman	17	22	0	2	41	2025–26 (W)
Ateneo de Manila University	11	7	12	0	30	2025–26 (M)
De La Salle University	11	5	1	3	20	2022–23 (W)
Far Eastern University	10	7	4	0	17	1987–88 (W)
University of the East	4	4	0	4	12	2013–14 (G)
National University	1	1	0	0	2	1952–53 (M&W)
Adamson University	0	0	0	0	0	None

== See also ==
- NCAA Philippines Swimming Championship
