= NU Bulldogs, Lady Bulldogs, Bullpups and Lady Bullpups =

Varsity teams

- School: National University
- League: UAAP
- Joined: 1938 (NCAA founding member – 1924)
- Location: 551 M. F. Jhocson St., Sampaloc, Manila, Philippines
- Team colors: Blue and Gold
- Women's team: NU Lady Bulldogs
- Juniors' team: Bullpups

Seniors' general championships
- UAAP: 1986–87

Juniors' general championships
- UAAP: none

The NU Bulldogs, Lady Bulldogs, Bullpups and Lady Bullpups are the collegiate men's and women's, and high school men's and women's, respectively, varsity teams of National University (NU) in the University Athletic Association of the Philippines.

The athletic director is Rustico “Otie” Camangian.

== Team identity ==
=== Team monikers ===
Since the UAAP began in 1938, NU's mascot has been 'Butch' the Bulldog.

National University is one of the eight UAAP member schools that participate in different sporting events of the University Athletic Association of the Philippines. Bulldog is the mascot of all the varsity teams participating in these sporting events. The official varsity team names sourced from the school's official student publications are as follows:

NU Team Monikers
Sport	Men's Team	Women's Team	Boys' Team	Girls' Team	Boys U16
3x3 Basketball	NU Bulldogs	NU Lady Bulldogs	NU Bullpups	NU Lady Bullpups	NU Bullpups
Basketball	NU Bulldogs	NU Lady Bulldogs	NU Bullpups	NU Lady Bullpups	NU Bullpups
Volleyball / Beach Volleyball	NU Bulldogs	NU Lady Bulldogs	NU Bullpups	NU Lady Bullpups	—N/a
Football	NU Booters	NU Lady Booters	NU Booters	—N/a	—N/a
Baseball	NU Batters	—N/a	NU Junior Batters	—N/a	—N/a
Softball	—N/a	NU Softbelles	—N/a	—N/a	—N/a
Judo	No team	No team	No team	No team	—N/a
Taekwondo/Poomsae	NU Jins	NU Lady Jins	NU Junior Jins		—N/a
Fencing	NU Fencers	No team	No team	No team	—N/a
Swimming	NU Otters	NU Lady Otters	Junior NU Otters	Junior Lady NU Otters	—N/a
Track and Field	NU Tracksters				—N/a
Badminton	NU Shuttlers	NU Lady Shuttlers	—N/a	—N/a	—N/a
Tennis	NU Tennisters	NU Lady Tennisters	—N/a	—N/a	—N/a
Table Tennis	NU Paddlers	NU Lady Paddlers	NU Paddlers	NU Paddlers	—N/a
Chess	NU Woodpushers	NU Lady Woodpushers	NU Junior Woodpushers	NU Junior Lady Woodpushers	—N/a
Esports	NU Bulldogs		—N/a	—N/a	—N/a
Cheerleading	NU Pep Squad		NU-Nazareth School Pep Squad		—N/a
Streetdance	NU Dance Company		NU Underdawgz		—N/a

== Team sports ==
=== Basketball ===
==== Men's ====
In the early years of the UAAP, the NU Bulldogs were a competitive team in the league, winning a title in 1954. However, by the 1980s, NU was perennially in the bottom ranking of the team standings. In the late 1990s, they improved their ranking by moving up to the middle of the team standings with now PBA stars Danny Ildefonso and Lordy Tugade in their team roster, but still failed to make it to the Final Four.

In 2001, the Bulldogs made a surprise trip to the Final Four. They were led by Jeff Napa who tied the record of UE's Allan Caidic for the most number of three-points made in a single UAAP game. However, they were not able to advance to the Finals as they were beaten by the La Salle Green Archers in their Final Four series.

After season 64 (2001–02), the NU Bulldogs returned to their mediocre performance despite having outstanding players such as Rey Mendoza, Edwin Asoro, both members of the Mythical Five in separate seasons and Jonathan Fernandez, who found some success playing for the PBL's Harbour Centre squad and the SEABA RP team.

In the last quarter of year 2008, the family of Henry Sy of SM Prime Holdings acquired majority ownership of the National University. Aside from improving school facilities, the new management has included in their corporate plan the improvement of NU's sports programs. After ten years, the National U Bulldogs made it again to the UAAP Final Four in 2012.

In the 77th season of the league, the NU Bulldogs won the tournament title.. At the start of the season, they were at the top of the standings above ADMU and DLSU (teams that are expected to come out strong in the season). But in the 2nd round of the tournament, the Bulldogs fell on the 4th spot tied with UE Red Warriors. They faced UE on a Knockout Game for the 4th seed, which they won 51–49. They have beaten the 1st seeded team in the league which is the ADMU Blue Eagles in 2 Do-or-Die games, making them the 2nd 'Number 4' team in the UAAP History to defeat the Number 1 team. After 44 years, NU made it again to the UAAP Finals. They faced the FEU Tamaraws in three games. After 60 long years of title drought, the National U Bulldogs clinched the title after winning against FEU, 75–59, in a Do-or-Die Wednesday, October 15, 2014, at the Smart Araneta Coliseum with a Record-Breaking Crowd of 25, 138 (biggest crowd ever to watch a basketball game at the venue, considering the game was held on a Wednesday).

==== Women's ====
The Lady Bulldogs have won six straight championships, including a winning streak of 100 straight games.

==== Junior ====
The NU Bulldogs have become a strong team in the league. They are expected to be a prospective contender in the upcoming seasons of the UAAP. The NU Bullpups have won four UAAP championships in four years. They won the UAAP championships in Season 74, 76, 78, 81.

==== NU Bulldogs Basketball team Awards and other achievements ====
Season	Conference	Placement	Reference
2007	Filoil EcoOil Preseason Cup	4th Place (Men's Seniors)	
2010	Father Martin Cup Division 2	Champions (Men's Seniors)	
2011	Father Martin Cup Summer	Champions (Men's Seniors')	
2012	Filoil EcoOil Preseason Cup	Champions (Men's Seniors)	
2013	Father Martin Cup Summer	Champions (Men's Seniors)	
2013	Filoil EcoOil Preseason Cup	Runners up (Men's Seniors)	
2015	Father Martin Cup Summer	Champions (Juniors')	
2016	Father Martin Cup Summer	Champions (Juniors')	
2016	Father Martin Cup Division 2	Runners up (Juniors')	
2016	Filoil EcoOil Preseason Cup	4th Place (Men's Seniors)	
2017	Father Martin Cup Division 2	Champions (Juniors')	
2018–19	Father Martin Cup Open	Champions (Men's Seniors)	
2022	Filoil EcoOil Preseason Cup	Champions (Men's Seniors)	

=== Volleyball ===
The National University Bulldogs Spikers won their first UAAP volleyball title in season 75 (2012–2013), while the NU Lady Bulldogs Spikers won their first in season 16 (1953–54). As of UAAP Season 77 the NU Bulldogs have won 2 UAAP volleyball titles while the NU Lady Bulldogs have 3 UAAP championships (Season 16 (1953–54), Season 19 (1956–57) and Season 84 (2021–22)).

==== NU Bulldogs Volleyball teams Awards and other achievements ====
Season	Conference	Placement	Reference
2010	V-League 7th Season 2nd Conference	6th Place (Women's)	
2011	V-League 8th Season 2nd Conference	4th Place (Women's)	
2014	Shakey's V-League 11th Season 1st Conference	Runners-up (Women's)	
2015	Shakey's V-League 12th Season Collegiate Conference	Champions (Women's)	
2016	Shakey's V-League 13th Season Open Conference	5th Place (Women's)	
2016	Shakey's V-League 13th Season Collegiate Conference	Champions (Women's)	
2017	Premier Volleyball League 1st Season Collegiate Conference	Champions (Women's)	
2017	Premier Volleyball League 1st Season Collegiate Conference	4th Place (Mens)	
2018	Premier Volleyball League 2nd Season Collegiate Conference	did not compete (Women's)	
2018	Premier Volleyball League 2nd Season Collegiate Conference	Champions (Women's)	
2018	2018 ASEAN University Games	Champions (Team Philippines Men's)	
2022	2022 ASEAN University Games	Runners-up (Team Philippines Men's)	
2022	2022 Datuk Bandar Cup Win Streak Volleyball Invitational Championship Malaysia		
2022	2022 Datuk Bandar Cup Win Streak Volleyball Invitational Championship Malaysia	4th Place (Team Philippines Men's)	
2022	2022 Shakey's Super League Collegiate Pre-Season Championship		
2022	2022 Shakey's Super League Collegiate Pre-Season Championship	Champions (Women's)	
2022	2022 V-League Collegiate Challenge		
2022	2022 V-League Collegiate Challenge	Champions (Men's)	

=== Rotation ===
NU Lady Bulldogs (UAAP Season 84)

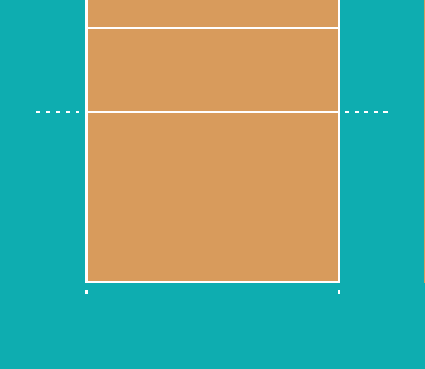

=== Beach volleyball ===
The school has men's and women's beach volleyball teams. The National University (NU) Bulldogs in Beach Volleyball have madhave competed in the University Athletic Association of the Philippines (UAAP). The team has been competitive and has consistently performed well in the league's beach volleyball tournament, which is one of the premier collegiate beach volleyball events in the country. The NU Beach Volleyball Team (both men's and women's) has gained attention for their consistent performances, particularly in the men's division. While they have not always been champions, they have been known for their strong competitive spirit and have produced notable results in recent UAAP seasons. While National University's Beach Volleyball Bulldogs have faced some challenges in clinching championships, their contributions to the sport and consistent performance have made them a force to be reckoned with in the UAAP's beach volleyball scene. With a focus on player development and strong team dynamics, The segment concludes with a focus on player development and team dynamics.

=== Baseball ===
The Bulldogs have found recent success in the UAAP baseball tournament. After years in the bottom of the team standings, NU has made it four consecutive times to the Final 4, from season 72 (2009–10 ) to season 75 (2012–13). In season 74 (2011–12) they not only made it to the Finals but also won the championship, their third since 1965. Again they repeated their Finals appearance the following year, season 75 (2012–13). This time however, they were not as fortunate. They finished runner-up to Ateneo.

=== Football ===
The first Lady Bulldogs football team in 2025. The team coached by Ryan Payson, had tryouts in August 2025. The women's football team took part in Ang Liga by early 2026.

The NU Lady Bulldogs made their debut in the women's football championship of the University Athletic Association of the Philippines (UAAP) in Season 89. They lost 0-5 to the FEU Lady Tamaraw Booters on their first ever UAAP game on September 23, 2026.

=== Softball ===
The National University Softball Team won the inaugural UAAP softball championship during the 1953–1954 season, the very year the sport was introduced to the league. Following their first title, NU successfully defended their title in the 1954–1955 season, securing back-to-back championships. These early victories established National University as a pioneering force in collegiate softball, laying the foundation for the sport's growth in the UAAP and cementing the Bulldogs' legacy in Philippine collegiate athletics.

== Performance sports ==
=== Cheerdance ===
The National U Pep Squad performs at the halftime of the basketball games of the NU Bulldogs in the University Athletic Association of the Philippines and represents the university in the UAAP Cheerdance Competition along with the NU Cheer Squadron and NU Drummers. They were the champions for four consecutive years (2013, 2014, 2015, and 2016). Their closest rival is the UP Pep Squad and UST Salinggawi Dance Troupe, which has been a consistent runner-up for the past three seasons. Ghicka Bernabe, a former member of FEU Cheering Squad, is the current head coach of the group.

==== NU Pep Squad Awards and other achievements ====
Year	Event	Placement	Ref.
2002	UAAP Cheerdance Competition	8th Place	
2003	UAAP Cheerdance Competition	8th Place	
2004	UAAP Cheerdance Competition	8th Place	
2005	UAAP Cheerdance Competition	8th Place	
2006	UAAP Cheerdance Competition	7th Place	
2007	UAAP Cheerdance Competition	8th Place	
2008	UAAP Cheerdance Competition	8th Place	
2009	UAAP Cheerdance Competition	5th Place	
2010	UAAP Cheerdance Competition	7th Place	
2011	UAAP Cheerdance Competition	6th Place	
2012	UAAP Cheerdance Competition	Third Place	
2013	UAAP Cheerdance Competition	Champions	
2013	National Cheerleading Championship	Champions	
2014	UAAP Cheerdance Competition	Champions	
2014	National Cheerleading Championship	Third Place	
2015	National Cheerleading Championship	Champions	
2015	ICU World Cheerleading Championship (Orlando, Florida)	Third Place (Team Pilipinas – Co-Ed Elite)	
2015	UAAP Cheerdance Competition	Champions	
2016	National Cheerleading Championship	Champions	
2016	UAAP Cheerdance Competition	Champions	
2017	National Cheerleading Championship	Champions	
2017	UAAP Cheerdance Competition	4th Place^{a}	
2018	UAAP Cheerdance Competition	Champions	
2019	UAAP Cheerdance Competition	Champions	
2020	UAAP Cheerdance Competition	Cancelled	
2021	UAAP Cheerdance Competition	Third Place	
2022	UAAP Cheerdance Competition	Champions	
2023	UAAP Cheerdance Competition	Second Place	
2024	UAAP Cheerdance Competition	Champions	
2025	UAAP Cheerdance Competition	Champions	

Notes:

- ^a - The NU Pep Squad and the FEU Cheering Squad finished the competition tied in the fourth place.

===== Group stunts division =====
Year	Event	Placement	Ref.
2011	UAAP Cheerdance Competition	Third Place	
2012	UAAP Cheerdance Competition	Third Place	
2013	UAAP Cheerdance Competition	Champions	
2014	UAAP Cheerdance Competition	Third Place	
2015	UAAP Cheerdance Competition	Second Place	
2015	National Cheerleading Championship	Champions (CoEd)	
2015	National Cheerleading Championship	Champions (All Girls)	
2016	National Cheerleading Championship	Second Place	
2017	UAAP Cheerdance Competition	5th Place	
2018	UAAP Cheerdance Competition	Champions	
2019	UAAP Cheerdance Competition	Champions	
2020	UAAP Cheerdance Competition	Cancelled	
2021	UAAP Cheerdance Competition	Cancelled	

=== Street Dance ===
==== NU Underdawgz Seniors' division Awards and other achievements ====
Year	Event	Placement	Ref.
2011	UAAP Street Dance Competition	8th Place	
2012	UAAP Street Dance Competition	6th Place	
2013	UAAP Street Dance Competition	6th Place	
2014	No competition was held.		
2015	UAAP Street Dance Competition	8th Place	
2016	UAAP Street Dance Competition	did not compete	
2017	UAAP Street Dance Competition	did not compete	
2018	UAAP Street Dance Competition	7th Place	
2019	UAAP Street Dance Competition	Third Place	
2020	UAAP Street Dance Competition	Cancelled	
2021	UAAP Street Dance Competition	Cancelled	

== Notable alumni ==
- Bryan Bagunas (Men's Volleyball)
- Narciso Bernardo (Men's Basketball)
- Carlos Loyzaga (NU High School Basketball)
- Jun Papa (Men's Basketball)
- Bobby Ray Parks Jr. (Men's Basketball)
- Bella Belen (Women's Volleyball)
- Jack Animam (Women's Basketball)
- Troy Rosario (Men's Basketball)
- Jennylyn Reyes (Women's Volleyball)
- Myla Pablo (Women's Volleyball)
- Afril Bernardino (Women's Basketball)
- Tin Patrimonio (Women's Tennis)
- Dindin Santiago-Manabat (Women's Volleyball)
- Jaja Santiago (Women's Volleyball)
- Risa Sato (Women's Volleyball)
- Danny Ildefonso - Professional basketball player, two-time PBA Most Valuable Player and three-time PBA Finals Most Valuable Player awardee
- Lordy Tugade - Professional basketball player
- Carlos Loyzaga (NU High School) - basketball player and former Olympian
- Narciso Bernardo - basketball player and former Olympian
- Jun Papa - Filipino basketball player, played for the NU Bulldogs in the University Athletic Association of the Philippines, Ysmael Steel Admirals and the Crispa-Floro Redmanizers in the Manila Industrial and Commercial Athletic Association and at the Summer Olympic Games in 1968 and 1972 as a member of the country's national basketball team.
- Jefferson Napa - Former basketball player and current head coach of the men's basketball team
- Froilan Baguion - Professional basketball player
- Jonathan Fernandez - Professional basketball player
- Bobby Ray Parks Jr. - Most Valuable Player for UAAP Season 74 and 75
- Troy Rosario - Professional basketball player
- Glenn Khobuntin - Professional basketball player
- Jewel Ponferada - Professional basketball player
- Dindin Santiago-Manabat - Volleyball Player
- Jaja Santiago - Volleyball Player
- Myla Pablo - Volleyball Player, Shakey's V-League finals MVP
- Jennylyn Reyes - Volleyball Player, Best Libero in the 2015 Philippine Super Liga All-Filipino
- Tin Patrimonio - Tennis player, model, actress and a former reality show contestant
- Dave Wilson Yu - Basketball player, UAAP Champion Season 77, Licensed Civil Engineer
- Alexie Caimoso Brooks - Most Valuable Player for UAAP Season 85 and Miss Eco International 2025

== UAAP Sports Championships ==
The table shows the number of championships of National University in the University Athletic Association of the Philippines (UAAP). Updated after UAAP Season 87

Sport	M	W	B	G	K	Total
Regular Sports
3X3 Basketball	0	3	—N/a	—N/a	—N/a	3
Basketball	2	8	8	—N/a	2	20
Badminton	9	0	—N/a	—N/a	—N/a	9
Beach Volleyball	4	1	1	1	—N/a	7
Baseball	6	—N/a	0	—N/a	—N/a	6
Chess	5	2	5	3	—N/a	15
Fencing	0	0	0	0	—N/a	0
Football	1	0	0	0	—N/a	1
Judo	0	0	0	0	—N/a	0
Softball	—N/a	2	—N/a	0	—N/a	2
Table Tennis	1	0	6	0	—N/a	7
Taekwondo	5	5	2	0	—N/a	12
Track and Field	2	0	0	0	—N/a	2
Tennis	7	7	0	0	—N/a	14
Swimming	1	1	0	0	—N/a	2
Volleyball	8	5	5	8	—N/a	26
Total	51	34	27	12	1	125
Exhibition Sports
Cheerdance	8					
Street Dance	0		1			1
Overall Championships
UAAP	1		0			1

== UAAP Championships Record ==
The following tables show the rankings history of National University in the UAAP.

=== Seniors division ===
- Gold border denotes overall championship season.
- Red border denotes host of the season.

X – Cancelled
* – Did Not Participate
- – Not part of UAAP sports calendar

UAAP Season	Seniors' Division																														Overall rank	
UAAP Season	3X3 Basketball		Basketball		Volleyball		Beach volleyball		Swimming		Chess		Table tennis		Tennis		Badminton		Track and field		Fencing		Taekwondo		Judo		Baseball	Softball	Football		Total Points	Rank
UAAP Season	M	W	M	W	M	W	M	W	M	W	M	W	M	W	M	W	M	W	M	W	M	W	M	W	M	W	M	W	M	W	-	-
70	-	-	6th	8th	8th	6th	6th	5th	*	*	6th	6th	5th	7th	*	*	*	8th	*	*	*	*	*	*	*	*	4th	*	*	*	45	8th
71	-	-	8th	7th	8th	8th	6th	5th	*	*	6th	7th	7th	6th	*	*	8th	8th	*	*	*	*	*	*	*	*	5th	*	*	*	35	8th
72	-	-	7th	7th	7th	8th	8th	6th	*	*	7th	5th	7th	6th	*	*	7th	7th	*	*	*	*	*	*	*	*	2nd	*	*	*	42	8th
73	-	-	5th	5th	7th	5th	8th	8th	*	*	7th	5th	6th	6th	*	*	3rd	8th	*	*	*	*	*	*	*	*	2nd	*	*	*	61	8th
74	-	-	5th	6th	5th	7th	7th	7th	*	*	5th	5th	6th	6th	3rd	*	2nd	8th	*	*	*	*	*	*	*	*	1st	*	*	*	81	8th
75	-	-	3rd	5th	1st	4th	1st	5th	*	*	5th	4th	6th	5th	1st	4th	1st	8th	*	*	7th	*	7th	5th	*	*	2nd	2nd	6th	*	161	6th
76	-	-	4th	2nd	1st	3rd	1st	5th	*	*	5th	5th	5th	5th	1st	1st	2nd	8th	*	*	7th	*	7th	6th	*	*	3rd	2nd	6th	*	169	6th
77	-	-	1st	1st	2nd	3rd	1st	5th	*	*	5th	4th	5th	5th	1st	1st	1st	8th	*	*	*	*	3rd	5th	*	*	4th	4th	5th	*	187	6th
78	-	-	4th	1st	2nd	5th	3rd	7th	5th	*	1st	4th	4th	5th	1st	1st	1st	6th	*	*	*	*	7th	6th	*	*	3rd	3rd	6th	*	177	6th
79	-	-	5th	1st	2nd	6th	4th	5th	6th	*	1st	*	3rd	5th	5th	1st	1st	4th	*	*	*	*	1st	1st	*	*	5th	3rd	5th	*	185	5th
80	3rd	1st	6th	1st	1st	4th	1st	5th	5th	5th	1st	1st	1st	7th	*	*	1st	4th	*	*	*	*	6th	1st	*	*	6th	4th	6th	*	180	5th
81	7th	1st	7th	1st	1st	6th	3rd	6th	*	*	2nd	7th	2nd	7th	1st	1st	1st	4th	4th	*	*	*	1st	1st	*	*	5th	4th	7th	*	197	5th
82	x	x	8th	1st	x	x	3rd	x	*	*	4th	7th	2nd	8th	x	x	3rd	3rd	x	*	*	*	1st	1st	*	*	x	x	x	*	117	5th
83	Cancelled due to COVID-19 pandemic																															
84	4th	1st	6th	-	-	1st	2nd	-	-	-	*	1st	-	-	-	-	-	-	-	-	-	-	-	-	-	-	-	-	-	-	81	2nd
85	3rd	2nd	3rd	1st	1st	2nd	2nd	2nd	*	*	*	1st	*	*	3rd	1st	1st	3rd	2nd	4th	*	*	1st	2nd	*	*	4th	*	*	*	233	6th
86	3rd	2nd	3rd	2nd	1st	1st	2nd	2nd	*	*	*	2nd	*	*	4th	1st	2nd	3rd	1st	6th	*	*	1st	2nd	*	*	1st	*	*	*	266	5th
87	4th	5th	7th	1st	1st	1st	2nd	1st	*	*	*	3rd	*	*	1st	2nd	2nd	1st	4th	4th	*	*	2nd	1st	*	*	1st	*	*	*	216	5th
88	3rd	7th	3rd	2nd	1st	2nd	2nd	2nd	*	*	*	1st	*	*	3rd	1st	3rd	2nd	1st	7th	*	*	1st	1st	*	*	1st	*	*	*	232	5th

=== Juniors division ===
- Gold border denotes overall championship season.
- Red border denotes host of the season.

X – Cancelled
* – Did Not Participate
- – Not part of UAAP sports calendar

UAAP Season	Juniors' Division																									Overall rank	
UAAP Season	3X3 Basketball			Basketball			Volleyball		Beach volleyball		Swimming		Chess		Table tennis		Track and field		Fencing		Taekwondo	Judo		Football	Baseball	Total Points	Rank
UAAP Season	B	G	K	B	G	K	B	G	B	G	B	G	B	G	B	G	B	G	B	G	B	B	G	B	B	-	-
70	-	-	-	8th	-	-	*	*	-	-	*	*	8th	8th	8th	*	*	*	*	*	*	*	*	*	-	24	8th
71	-	-	-	7th	-	-	5th	*	-	-	*	*	5th	5th	6th	*	*	*	*	*	*	*	*	*	-	18	8th
72	-	-	-	7th	-	-	4th	*	-	-	*	*	4th	4th	3rd	*	*	*	*	*	*	*	*	*	-	28	8th
73	-	-	-	4th	-	-	3rd	*	-	-	*	*	3rd	3rd	2nd	*	*	*	*	*	*	*	*	*	-	40	7th
74	-	-	-	1st	-	-	3rd	5th	-	-	*	*	3rd	3rd	2nd	*	*	*	*	*	*	*	*	*	-	53	6th
75	-	-	-	2nd	-	-	2nd	2nd	-	-	*	*	3rd	3rd	1st	*	*	*	*	*	*	*	*	*	-	61	5th
76	-	-	-	1st	-	-	2nd	2nd	-	-	*	*	1st	1st	2nd	*	*	*	*	*	*	*	*	*	-	6	6th
77	-	-	-	2nd	-	-	3rd	1st	-	-	*	*	1st	1st	3rd	*	*	*	*	*	*	*	*	*	-	62	5th
78	-	-	-	1st	-	-	1st	1st	-	-	6th	5th	3rd	3rd	2nd	*	*	*	*	*	*	*	*	*	-	77	4th
79	-	-	-	2nd	-	-	1st	1st	-	-	4th	5th	-	-	1st	*	*	*	*	*	*	*	*	*	-	71	2nd
80	-	-	-	2nd	-	-	3rd	1st	-	-	*	*	-	-	*	*	*	*	*	*	*	*	*	3rd	-	47	2nd
81	-	-	-	1st	-	-	1st	2nd	-	-	*	*	-	-	*	*	*	*	*	*	*	*	*	2nd	2nd	66	5th
82	-	-	-	1st	-	-	1st	1st	-	-	*	*	2nd	1st	*	*	*	*	*	*	3rd	*	*	2nd	3rd	114	3rd
83	Cancelled due to COVID-19 pandemic																										
84	Cancelled due to COVID-19 pandemic																										
85	-	-	-	3rd	-	-	2nd	1st	2nd	4th	*	*	*	2nd	*	*	*	*	*	*	3rd	*	*	*	*	109	7th
86	7th	2nd	-	2nd	-	-	1st	2nd	1st	4th	*	*	*	2nd	*	*	5th	*	*	*	1st	*	*	*	-	109	7th
87	2nd	2nd	6th	2nd	2nd	4th	2nd	1st	2nd	1st	*	*	*	3rd	*	*	4th	4th	*	*	1st	*	*	*	-	155	3rd
88	3rd	1st	7th	2nd	2nd	1st	2nd	1st	2nd	3rd	*	*	*	2nd	*	*	3rd	*	*	*	3rd	*	*	*	3rd	169	5th

== See also ==
- University Athletic Association of the Philippines
- National University (Philippines)
