= UAAP chess championships =

Chess tournament

The University Athletic Association of the Philippines Chess tournament is held yearly by the UAAP.

Rapid and Blitz Chess were also introduced as demonstration sports in UAAP Season 87. Rapid was discontinued while Blitz was elevated to regular sport status in UAAP Season 88.

== UAAP Standard Chess Champions ==
Note: This list is incomplete

Season	Men's	Women's	Boys'	Girls'
Season 42 (1979–80)	Far Eastern University (1)			
Season 43 (1980–81)	Far Eastern University (2)			
Season 44 (1981–82)	Far Eastern University (3)			
Season 45 (1982–83)	National University (1)			
Season 46 (1983–84)	University of Santo Tomas (1)			
Season 47 (1984–85)	University of Santo Tomas (2)			
Season 48 (1985–86)	Adamson University (1)			
Season 49 (1986–87)	National University (2)			
Season 50 (1987–88)	Adamson University (2)			
Season 51 (1988–89)	Adamson University (3)			
Season 52 (1989–90)	Far Eastern University (4)			
Season 53 (1990–91)	Adamson University (4)			
Season 54 (1991–92)	University of the East (1)		National University (1)	
Season 55 (1992–93)	Far Eastern University (5)		National University (2)	
Season 56 (1993–94)	University of the East (2)		National University (3)	
Season 57 (1994–95	University of Santo Tomas (3)			
Season 58 (1995–96)	Far Eastern University (6)		Ateneo de Manila University (1)	
Season 59 (1996–97)	University of Santo Tomas (4)	University of Santo Tomas (1)	Ateneo de Manila University (2)	
Season 60 (1997–98)	University of Santo Tomas (5)		Ateneo de Manila University (3)	
Season 61 (1998–99)	University of Santo Tomas (6)	Far Eastern University (1)	Ateneo de Manila University (4)	
Season 62 (1999–00)	De La Salle University (1)		Ateneo de Manila University (5)	
Season 63 (2000–01)	De La Salle University (2)		Ateneo de Manila University (6)	
Season 64 (2001–02)	De La Salle University (3)		Ateneo de Manila University (7)	
Season 65 (2002–03)	De La Salle University (4)	De La Salle University (1)	University of the East (1)	
Season 66 (2003–04)	De La Salle University (5)	University of the Philippines Diliman (1)	University of the East (2)	
Season 67 (2004–05)	De La Salle University (6)	University of the Philippines Diliman (2)	University of the East (3)	
Season 68 (2005–06)	University of the Philippines Diliman (1)	University of Santo Tomas (2)	University of the East (4)	
Season 69 (2006–07)	Far Eastern University (7)	University of Santo Tomas (3)	University of the East (5)	
Season 70 (2007–08)	Far Eastern University (8)	University of Santo Tomas (4)	Adamson University (1)	
Season 71 (2008–09)	Far Eastern University (9)	De La Salle University (2)	Adamson University (2)	
Season 72 (2009–10)	Far Eastern University (10)	Far Eastern University (2)	Adamson University (3)	
Season 73 (2010–11)	Far Eastern University (11)	De La Salle University (3)	Far Eastern University (1)	
Season 74 (2011–12)	Far Eastern University (12)	De La Salle University (4)	Far Eastern University (2)	
Season 75 (2012–13}	University of Santo Tomas (7)	De La Salle University (5)	Far Eastern University (3)	
Season 76 (2013–14)	Far Eastern University (13)	De La Salle University (6)	National University (4)	
Season 77 (2014–15)	De La Salle University (7)	Far Eastern University (3)	National University (5)	
Season 78 (2015–16)	National University (3)	De La Salle University (7)	Far Eastern University (4)	
Season 79 (2016–17)	National University (4)	Far Eastern University (4)	Far Eastern University (5)	
Season 80 (2017–18)	National University (5)	De La Salle University (8)	Far Eastern University (6)	
Season 81 (2018–19)	Far Eastern University (14)	De La Salle University (9)	Far Eastern University (7)	National University (1)
Season 82 (2019–20)	Far Eastern University (15)	Far Eastern University (5)	University of the East (6)	National University (2)
Season 83 (2020–21)	Cancelled due to COVID-19 pandemic			
Season 84 (2021–22)	University of Santo Tomas (8)	National University (1)	Cancelled due to COVID-19 pandemic	
Season 85 (2022–23)	University of Santo Tomas (9)	National University (2)	Far Eastern University (8)	Far Eastern University (1)
Season 86 (2023–24)	University of Santo Tomas (10)	Far Eastern University (6)	Far Eastern University (9)	Far Eastern University (2)
Season 87 (2024–25)	University of Santo Tomas (11)	Far Eastern University (7)	Far Eastern University (10)	Far Eastern University (3)
Season 88 (2025–26)	University of Santo Tomas (12)	National University (3)	University of Santo Tomas (1)	University of Santo Tomas (1)

== UAAP Rapid Chess Champions ==
Season	Men's	Women's	Boys'	Girls'
Season 87 (2024–25)	University of Santo Tomas (1)	Far Eastern University (1)	Far Eastern University (1)	University of Santo Tomas (1)

== UAAP Blitz Chess Champions ==
Season	Men's	Women's	Boys'	Girls'
Season 87 (2024–25)	Far Eastern University (1)	Ateneo de Manila University (1)	University of Santo Tomas (1)	National University (1)
Season 88 (2025–26)	University of Santo Tomas (1)	Far Eastern University (1)	Far Eastern University (1)	Far Eastern University (1)

== Number of championships by school ==
School	Men's division	Women's division	Boys' division	Girls' division	Total
Far Eastern University	16	8	11	3	38
University of Santo Tomas	12	4	1	1	18
De La Salle University	6	9	0	0	15
National University	5	2	5	3	15
University of the East	2	0	6	0	8
Ateneo de Manila University	0	1	7	0	8
Adamson University	4	0	3	0	7
