= PAREF Schools =

- Cedar Mansion II, Pasig, Metro Manila; Philippines

Information
- Type: Educational foundation
- Religious affiliation: Catholic Church (Opus Dei)
- Established: 1976
- Founders: Dionisio Buencamino; Manuel Cardenas; Maria Teresa Guerrero; Miguel Guerrero; Maria Luisa Lorenzo; Hermilando Mandanas; Corazon Mapa; Placido Mapa Jr.
- Gender: Male or female
- Campus: 8 main schools, 9 pre-schools
- Organization: Parents for Education Foundation, Inc.
- Website: paref.edu.ph

Parents for Education Foundation, Inc. (PAREF) is an educational foundation established by parents that administers schools for basic education in the Philippines, collectively known as PAREF Schools. It owns several single-sex Catholic schools that are closely affiliated with Opus Dei.

== History ==
Parents who derives inspiration from the teachings of Catholic saint Josemaría Escrivá organized themselves in 1976 as the Parents for Education Foundation, Inc. (PAREF). They believe in an "integral education" for their children that puts parents role first, and teachers role second. The founders states that PAREF is a response to what they believe as "confusion" on Catholic teachings arising from the Second Vatican Council and the sexual revolution in the Western world which followed it. The parents-founders would pattern their system to the Fomento schools system in Spain.

It established its first school in 1976 - Woodrose School, a girls' school for up to fifth grade in New Manila, Quezon City. It later moved its campus to Ayala Alabang Village.

In 1979, Southridge School for boys up to seventh grade was established at the Hillsborough Subdivision in Muntinlupa. It initially was housed inside a incomplete two-storey building. Collectively Woodrose and Southridge began to be referred to as the PAREF Tandem Schools.

Kindergarten was introduced to the school system's program with the establishment of Rosemont and Ridgefield School in 1986 and 1990 respectively. The two schools are referred to as "Alabang Preparatory Schools" as they serve as feeders to Southridge and Woodrose. The PAREF Schools system continued to grow to consist of seventeen schools.

== Sports ==
The PAREF Southridge School has been participating at the University Athletic Association of the Philippines (UAAP) as a guest team. Their participation was first announced in November 2024. They debuted at the Season 87 in 2025 finishing as semifinalists in the boys' football tournament. They later also participated in athletics, swimming, baseball, tennis, and fencing. The Admirals in the baseball tournament won the boys' title in Season 88 in 2026 becoming the first guest team to win a UAAP title.

The PAREF Springdale School Titans joined the Cebu-based league CESAFI and has fielded a football team.

== Member schools ==
PAREF presently has 8 "big schools" and 9 pre-schools.

PAREF Big Schools
Name	Location	Gender	Established	Notes	Ref.
Southridge	Muntinlupa, Metro Manila	Boys	1979		
Northfield	Antipolo, Rizal	Boys	1995		
Woodrose	Muntinlupa, Metro Manila	Girls	1976		
Rosehill	Antipolo, Rizal	Girls	1990	Formerly located in Quezon City, moved to current site in 1993.	
Westbridge	Iloilo City	Boys	1992		
Springdale	Cebu City	Boys	1996		
Southcrest	Cebu City	Girls	1995		
Ridgefield Iloilo	Iloilo City	Girls			
