= UAAP athletics championships =

Track and field championship

Track and field athletics has been a part of the University Athletic Association of the Philippines since the league's inception in 1938.

== List ==
Season	Men's	Women's	Boys	Girls
1 (1938–39)	University of the Philippines Diliman (1)			
2 (1939–40)	University of the Philippines Diliman (2)			
3 (1940–41)	University of the Philippines Diliman (3)			
4 (1941–42)	Not held due to World War II.			
5 (1942–43)	Not held due to World War II.			
6 (1943–44)	Not held due to World War II.			
7 (1944–45)	Not held due to World War II.			
8 (1945–46)	Not held due to World War II.			
9 (1946–47)	Not held due to World War II.			
10 (1947–48)	Far Eastern University (1)			
11 (1948–49)	Far Eastern University (2)			
12 (1949–50)	University of the Philippines Diliman (4)			
13 (1950–51)	Far Eastern University (3)			
14 (1951–52)	University of the Philippines Diliman (5)			
15 (1952–53)	University of the Philippines Diliman (6)			
16 (1953–54)	University of Santo Tomas (1)			
17 (1954–55)	University of Santo Tomas (2)			
18 (1955–56)	University of Santo Tomas (3)			
19 (1956–57)	Manila Central University (1)			
20 (1957–58)	University of the Philippines Diliman (7)			
21 (1958–59)	Manila Central University (2)			
22 (1959–60)	Manila Central University (3)			
23 (1960–61)	Manila Central University (4)			
24 (1961–62)	Manila Central University (5)			
25 (1962–63)	University of Santo Tomas (4)			
26 (1963–64)	University of the Philippines Diliman (8)			
27 (1964–65)	University of the Philippines Diliman (9)			
28 (1965–66)	University of the Philippines Diliman (10)			
29 (1966–67)	University of the Philippines Diliman (11)			
30 (1967–68)	University of the Philippines Diliman (12)			
31 (1968–69)	Far Eastern University (4)			
32 (1969–70)	Far Eastern University (5)			
33 (1970–71)	Far Eastern University (6)			
34 (1971–72)	Not held			
35 (1972–73)	Not held			
36 (1973–74)	Not held			
37 (1974–75)	Not held			
38 )1975–76)	University of the Philippines Diliman (13)			
39 (1976–77)	University of the Philippines Diliman (14)			
40 (1977–78)	University of the Philippines Diliman (15)			
41 (1978–79)	University of the Philippines Diliman (16)			
42 (1979–80)	University of the Philippines Diliman (17)		Ateneo de Manila University (1)	
42 (1979–80)	University of Santo Tomas (5)		Ateneo de Manila University (1)	
43 (1980–81)	Far Eastern University (7)		Ateneo de Manila University (2)	
44 (1981–82)	University of the Philippines Diliman (18)		Ateneo de Manila University (3)	
45 (1982–83)	Far Eastern University (8)		Ateneo de Manila University (4)	
46 (1983–84)	Far Eastern University (9)	Far Eastern University (1)	Ateneo de Manila University (5)	
47 (1984–85)	Far Eastern University (10)	Far Eastern University (2)	Ateneo de Manila University (6)	
48 (1985–86)	Far Eastern University (11)	Far Eastern University (3)	Ateneo de Manila University (7)	
49 (1986–87)	Far Eastern University (12)	Far Eastern University (4)	Ateneo de Manila University (8)	
50 (1987–88)	Far Eastern University (13)	Far Eastern University (5)	Ateneo de Manila University (9)	
51 (1988–89)	Far Eastern University (14)	Far Eastern University (6)	Ateneo de Manila University (10)	
52 (1989–90)	Adamson University (1)	Far Eastern University (7)	Ateneo de Manila University (11)	
53 (1990–91)	Adamson University (2)	Adamson University (1)	Ateneo de Manila University (12)	
54 (1991–92)	Adamson University (3)	Adamson University (2)	Ateneo de Manila University (13)	
55 (1992–93)	University of Santo Tomas (6)	Far Eastern University (8)	Ateneo de Manila University (14)	
56 (1993–94)	University of Santo Tomas (7)	University of Santo Tomas (1)	Ateneo de Manila University (15)	
57 (1994–95)	University of the East (1)	Far Eastern University (9)	Ateneo de Manila University (16)	
58 (1995–96)	University of the East (2)	Far Eastern University (10)	Ateneo de Manila University (17)	
59 (1996–97)	University of the East (3)	Far Eastern University (11)	Ateneo de Manila University (18)	
60 (1997–98)	University of the East (4)	Far Eastern University (12)	Ateneo de Manila University (19)	
61 (1998–99)	University of the East (5)	Far Eastern University (13)	Adamson University (1)	
62 (1999–00)	University of the East (6)	University of Santo Tomas (2)	Ateneo de Manila University (20)	
63 (2000–01)	University of the East (7)	University of Santo Tomas (3)	Ateneo de Manila University (21)	
64 (2001–02)	University of the East (8)	University of Santo Tomas (4)	Ateneo de Manila University (22)	
65 (2002–03)	University of Santo Tomas (8)	University of the East (1)	Ateneo de Manila University (23)	
66 (2003–04)	University of the East (9)	Far Eastern University (14)	University of Santo Tomas (1)	
67 (2004–05)	De La Salle University (1)	Far Eastern University (15)	University of Santo Tomas (2)	
68 (2005–06)	Far Eastern University (15)	Far Eastern University (16)	University of Santo Tomas (3)	
69 (2006–07)	Far Eastern University (16)	Far Eastern University (17)	University of Santo Tomas (4)	
70 (2007–08)	Far Eastern University (17)	Far Eastern University (18)	University of Santo Tomas (5)	
71 (2008–09)	Far Eastern University (18)	Far Eastern University (19)	Ateneo de Manila University (24)	
72 (2009–10)	University of the East (10)	Far Eastern University (20)	University of the Philippines Diliman (1)	
73 (2010–11)	Far Eastern University (19)	Far Eastern University (21)	University of the Philippines Diliman (2)	
74 (2011–12)	Far Eastern University (20)	Far Eastern University (22)	University of the Philippines Diliman (3)	
75 (2012–13)	Far Eastern University (21)	Far Eastern University (23)	University of the Philippines Diliman (4)	
76 (2013–14)	Far Eastern University (22)	Far Eastern University (24)	University of the East (1)	
77 (2014–15)	Far Eastern University (23)	University of Santo Tomas (5)	University of the East (2)	
78 (2015–16)	Far Eastern University (24)	University of Santo Tomas (6)	University of the East (3)	University of the East (1)
79 (2016–17)	Far Eastern University (25)	University of Santo Tomas (7)	University of the East (4)	University of the East (2)
80 (2017–18)	Far Eastern University (26)	University of Santo Tomas (8)	University of the East (5)	University of the East (3)
81 (2018–19)	University of the Philippines Diliman (19)	Far Eastern University (25)^{[^]}	University of the East (6)	University of the East (4)
82 (2019–20)	Not held due to the COVID-19 pandemic.			
83 (2020–21)	Not held due to the COVID-19 pandemic.			
84 (2021–22)	Not held due to the COVID-19 pandemic.			
85 (2022–23)	University of the Philippines Diliman (20)	University of Santo Tomas (9)	Adamson University (1)	University of Santo Tomas (1)
86 (2023–24)	National University (1)	De La Salle University (1)	Adamson University (2)	University of Santo Tomas (2)
87 (2024–25)	University of the Philippines Diliman (21)	Far Eastern University (26)	University of Santo Tomas (6)	University of the East (5)
88 (2025–26)	National University (2)	Far Eastern University (27)	University of Santo Tomas (7)	Adamson University (1)

Note:
- ^^ FEU was crowned as the official champion for the UAAP Season 81 Women's Track and Field during the closing ceremonies of the UAAP Season 81 last May 21, 2019.

== Number of championships per university ==
University	Collegiate		High School		Total
University	M	W	B	G	Total
Far Eastern University	26	25	0	0	51
University of Santo Tomas	9	9	7	2	27
University of the Philippines Diliman	21	0	4	0	25
Ateneo de Manila University	0	0	24	0	24
University of the East	9	1	6	5	21
Adamson University	3	2	2	1	8
Manila Central University*	5	0	0	0	5
De La Salle University	1	1	0	0	2
National University	2	0	0	0	2

* Withdrew from the UAAP.

== Streaks ==
- Ateneo owns the longest Juniors Championship streak with 19. (coached first by Benjamin Silva-Netto followed by Edward Sediego)
- FEU owns the longest Women's Championship streak with 11.
- FEU and UE share the longest Men's Championship streak with 8.

== See also ==
- NCAA Philippines Track and Field Championship
