= UAAP table tennis championships =

Table tennis championship

The University Athletic Association of the Philippines Table tennis champions.

== UAAP table tennis champions ==
This list is incomplete.

UAAP Season	Men's	Women's	Boys'	Girls'
41 (1978–79)	Far Eastern University (1)			
42 (1979–80)	University of Santo Tomas (1)			
43 (1980–81)	University of Santo Tomas (2)			
44 (1981–82)	University of Santo Tomas (3)			
45 (1982–83)	University of Santo Tomas (4)			
46 (1983–84)	University of Santo Tomas (5)	Far Eastern University (1)	Ateneo de Manila University (1)	
47 (1984–85)	University of Santo Tomas (6)	Far Eastern University (2)		
48 (1985–86)	University of the Philippines Diliman (1)	Far Eastern University (3)		
49 (1986–87)	University of Santo Tomas (7)	University of Santo Tomas (1)	National University (1)	
50 (1987–88)	University of Santo Tomas (8)	Far Eastern University (4)	National University (2)	
51 (1988–89)	University of Santo Tomas (9)	Far Eastern University (5)		
52 (1989–90)	Adamson University (1)	University of Santo Tomas (2)	National University (3)	
53 (1990–91)	University of Santo Tomas (10)	University of Santo Tomas (3)		
54 (1991–92)	University of Santo Tomas (11)	University of Santo Tomas (4)		
55 (1992–93)	University of Santo Tomas (12)	University of Santo Tomas (5)		
56 (1993–94)	University of Santo Tomas (13)	University of Santo Tomas (6)		
57 (1994–95)	University of Santo Tomas (14)	Far Eastern University (6)		
58 (1995–96)	University of Santo Tomas (15)	Far Eastern University (7)		
59 (1996–97)	University of Santo Tomas (16)	University of Santo Tomas (7)	Adamson University (1)	
59 (1996–97)	University of Santo Tomas (16)	University of Santo Tomas (7)	University of the East (1)	
60 (1997–98)	De La Salle University (1)	University of the Philippines Diliman (1)		
61 (1998–99)	University of the Philippines Diliman (2)	University of the Philippines Diliman (2)	University of the East (2)	
62 (1999-00)	University of the East (1)	University of the Philippines Diliman (3)		
63 (2000–01)	De La Salle University (2)	University of the Philippines Diliman (4)		
64 (2001–02)		University of Santo Tomas (8)		
65 (2002–03)	University of Santo Tomas (17)	University of Santo Tomas (9)	University of the East (3)	
66 (2003–04)	University of Santo Tomas (18)	University of Santo Tomas (10)	University of the East (4)	
67 (2004–05)	University of Santo Tomas (19)	De La Salle University (1)	University of the East (5)	
68 (2005–06)	University of Santo Tomas (20)	University of Santo Tomas (11)	University of the East (6)	
69 (2006–07)	Far Eastern University (2)	University of Santo Tomas (12)	University of Santo Tomas (1)	
70 (2007–08)	University of Santo Tomas (21)	Far Eastern University (8)	University of Santo Tomas (2)	
71 (2008–09)	University of Santo Tomas (22)	Far Eastern University (9)	University of Santo Tomas (3)	
72 (2009–10)	Far Eastern University (3)	Far Eastern University (10)	University of the East (7)	
73 (2010–11)	University of Santo Tomas (23)	Far Eastern University (11)	University of the East (8)	
74 (2011–12)	University of Santo Tomas (24)	University of the Philippines Diliman (5)	University of the East (9)	
75 (2012–13)	University of Santo Tomas (25)	De La Salle University (2)	National University (4)	
76 (2013–14)	De La Salle University (3)	University of the Philippines Diliman (6)	University of the East (10)	
77 (2014–15)	De La Salle University (4)	De La Salle University (3)	University of the East (11)	
78 (2015–16)	De La Salle University (5)	De La Salle University (4)	De La Salle University (1)	De La Salle University (1)
79 (2016–17)	University of Santo Tomas (26)	De La Salle University (5)	National University (5)	University of Santo Tomas (1)
80 (2017–18)	National University (1)	De La Salle University (6)	National University (6)	University of Santo Tomas (2)
81 (2018–19)	University of Santo Tomas (27)	University of Santo Tomas (13)	University of the East (12)	University of the East (1)
82 (2019–20)	University of Santo Tomas (28)	University of Santo Tomas (14)	De La Salle University (2)	De La Salle University (2)
83 (2020–21)	Cancelled due to COVID-19 pandemic			
84 (2021–22)	Not held due to COVID-19 pandemic			
85 (2022–23)	University of Santo Tomas (29)	De La Salle University (7)	De La Salle University (3)	University of Santo Tomas (3)
86 (2023–24)	University of Santo Tomas (30)	De La Salle University (8)	University of Santo Tomas (4)	University of Santo Tomas (4)
87 (2024–25)	University of Santo Tomas (31)	University of Santo Tomas (15)	University of Santo Tomas (5)	University of Santo Tomas (5)
88 (2025–26)	University of Santo Tomas (32)	Far Eastern University (12)	University of Santo Tomas (6)	University of Santo Tomas (6)

== Awards ==
=== Most Valuable Players ===
UAAP Season	Men's	Women's	Boys'	Girls'
74 (2011–12)		Bea Magpantay	Lyr Eden Leyva	
75 (2012–13)	Martin Diaz	Ian Lariba	Ryan Jacolo	
76 (2013–14)	Walden Ledesma	Joma Illa Sibal	Jomari Ingeniero	
77 (2014–15)	Jerald Cristobal	Ian Lariba	Lyndon Jose	Paul Vincent Tolentino
78 (2015–16)	Walden Ledesma	Ian Lariba	Elijah Yamson	Phoebe Jay Jumamoy
79 (2016–17)	Norielle Pantoja	Emy Rose Dael		
80 (2017–18)	John Russel Misal	Emy Rose Dael	Stephen John Deiz	
81 (2018–19)	Paul Que	Katrina Tempiatura	Bill Christian Perez	Ana Sofia Fabregas
82 (2019–20)	Raymark Mabuang	Sherlyn Gabisay	Elijah Yamson	Angelou Laude
83 (2020–21)	Cancelled due to COVID-19 pandemic			
84 (2021–22)	Not held due to COVID-19 pandemic			
85 (2022–23)	Alvin Sevilla	Jannah Romero	Troy Docto	Althea Jade Gudes
86 (2023–24)	John Michael Castro	Angel Joyce Laude	Jebb Datahan	J-An Sanchez
87 (2024–25)	Eljay Tormis	Althea Gudes	Jebb Datahan	J-An Sanchez

=== Rookie of the Year ===
UAAP Season	Men's	Women's	Boys'	Girls'
68 (2005–06)	Percival Elfan			
74 (2011–12)	Walden Ledesma			
75 (2012–13)	Alberto Bazar	Donna Gamilla	Jomari Ingeniero	
76 (2013–14)	John Russel Misal	Noriko Nishino	Alvin Credo	
77 (2014–15)	Vladimir Venz Rarama	Josephine Talay		
78 (2015–16)	Carlo Mateo	Emy Rose Dael	Neo Angelo Laudat	Sharlina Andino
79 (2016–17)	Nathan Siasico		Jazper Pacis	Danielle Marcelo
80 (2017–18)		Joana Chen	Zire Salazar	
81 (2018–19)	John Michael Castro	Jannah Romero		
82 (2019–20)	Jed Villaviray	Kaela Aguilar	Henze Lucero	Chrishien Santillan
83 (2020–21)	Cancelled due to COVID-19 pandemic			
84 (2021–22)	Not held due to COVID-19 pandemic			
85 (2022–23)	Eljey Tormis	Aizel Mae Rom	Jhiven Clamucha	Althea Gudes
86 (2023–24)	Rod Andree Garcia	Jelaine Monteclaro	Troy Rodriguez	Olympia Ducanes
87 (2024–25)	Ray Joshua Manlapaz	Althea Gudes	Ivan Eguia	Julianne Bandojo
