= UAAP badminton championships =

Badminton championships

The UAAP badminton championships are badminton tournaments on the Philippines for university teams.

== Results ==
Denotes school won both men's and women's championship in the same year

UAAP Season	Men's		Women's	
UAAP Season	Champions	Runner-up	Champions	Runner-up
58 (1995–96)	Ateneo de Manila University	---	University of the Philippines Diliman	---
59 (1996–97)	Ateneo de Manila University	University of Santo Tomas	University of the Philippines Diliman	Ateneo de Manila University
60 (1997–98)	University of the Philippines Diliman	---	University of the Philippines Diliman	---
61 (1998–99)	University of the Philippines Diliman	University of Santo Tomas	University of the Philippines Diliman	Far Eastern University
62 (1999–00)	University of the Philippines Diliman	---	University of the Philippines Diliman	---
63 (2000–01)	University of the Philippines Diliman	Far Eastern University	University of the Philippines Diliman	Far Eastern University
64 (2001–02)	Far Eastern University	University of the Philippines Diliman	Far Eastern University	University of Santo Tomas
65 (2002–03)	University of the Philippines Diliman	Far Eastern University	De La Salle University	Ateneo de Manila University
66 (2003–04)	Far Eastern University	University of Santo Tomas	Ateneo de Manila University	Far Eastern University
67 (2004–05)	University of Santo Tomas	Far Eastern University	De La Salle University	Ateneo de Manila University
68 (2005–06)	University of Santo Tomas	Far Eastern University	De La Salle University	Far Eastern University
69 (2006–07)	Far Eastern University	University of the East	Far Eastern University	University of Santo Tomas
70 (2007–08)	De La Salle University	University of the East	University of Santo Tomas	Far Eastern University
71 (2008–09)	University of the East	University of Santo Tomas	Far Eastern University	De La Salle University
72 (2009–10)	University of Santo Tomas	De La Salle University	De La Salle University	University of the East
73 (2010–11)	University of Santo Tomas	Ateneo de Manila University	Far Eastern University	De La Salle University
74 (2011–12)	Ateneo de Manila University	National University	University of the East	Ateneo de Manila University
75 (2012–13)	National University	Ateneo de Manila University	Ateneo de Manila University	Far Eastern University
76 (2013–14)	Ateneo de Manila University	National University	Ateneo de Manila University	De La Salle University
77 (2014–15)	National University	De La Salle University	University of the Philippines Diliman	Ateneo de Manila University
78 (2015–16)	National University	De La Salle University	University of the Philippines Diliman	Ateneo de Manila University
79 (2016–17)	National University	Ateneo de Manila University	University of the Philippines Diliman	Ateneo de Manila University
80 (2017–18)	National University	University of the Philippines Diliman	De La Salle University	University of the Philippines Diliman
81 (2018–19)	National University	University of the Philippines Diliman	Ateneo de Manila University	University of the Philippines Diliman
82 (2019–20)	National University	Ateneo de Manila University	Ateneo de Manila University	De La Salle University
83 (2020–21)	Cancelled due to COVID-19 pandemic		Cancelled due to COVID-19 pandemic	
84 (2022–22)	Not held due to COVID-19 pandemic		Not held due to COVID-19 pandemic	
85 (2022–23)	National University	Ateneo de Manila University	Ateneo de Manila University	University of the Philippines Diliman
86 (2023–24)	Ateneo de Manila University	National University	Ateneo de Manila University	University of the Philippines Diliman
87 (2024-25)	National University	Ateneo de Manila University	University of the Philippines Diliman	Ateneo de Manila University
88 (2025-26)	Ateneo de Manila University	University of the Philippines Diliman	Ateneo de Manila University	National University

== Streaks ==
- UP owns the longest streak for consecutive titles in the Women's Division at six. NU holds seven straight titles in the Men's Division.
- UP also won a "double crown" (winning both Men's and Women's) for four consecutive years (1997–2000). Ateneo had two double crowns in 2013–2014 and 2023-2024, while FEU achieved the feat in the 2001–2002 and 2006–2007 Seasons.

== Number of championships by school ==
University	Men's	Women's	Total	Last Badminton Championship
University of the Philippines Diliman	5	10	15	2002–03 (M), 2024–25 (W)
Ateneo de Manila University	6	8	14	2025–26 (M & W)
National University	9	0	9	2024–25 (M)
De La Salle University	1	5	6	2007–08 (M), 2017–18 (W)
Far Eastern University	3	4	7	2006–07 (M), 2010–11 (W)
University of Santo Tomas	4	1	5	2010–11 (M), 2007–08 (W)
University of the East	1	1	2	2008–09 (M), 2011–12 (W)
