= UAAP judo championships =

Judo competition

The University Athletic Association of the Philippines (UAAP) Judo Tournament was previously held during the second semester of the school year. Due to a conflict with volleyball television coverage, though, it was moved to the first semester. Judo was a demonstration sport in the Juniors Division in UAAP Season 69, 70, and 71, and is not included in the official count of total titles.

For this event, both the Men's and Women's teams have seven weight divisions each, and two representatives per weight division. Gold, silver, and bronze medals are awarded to the winners of each division, with each medal being assigned a corresponding number of points. A gold medal is worth 10 points; silver, 5; and bronze, 2. The medal tally and accumulated points per team determines the overall standing of each team, with the highest-scoring team receiving the championship trophy. Men's and Women's medal tallies are independent of each other, yielding one champion for the Men's division, and one champion for the Women's division.

One judoka from the Men's division and one from the Women's receives a Most Valuable Player (MVP) Award. The same goes for the Rookie of the Year Award. These awardees are chosen after the competition has concluded and the complete medal tallies are in. Judokas from the Champion team are the only ones who can vie for the MVP Award.

== UAAP judo champions ==
Triple/Quadruple Championships:

- Denotes school won the championship in all divisions in the same year

Double Championships:

- Won the men's and women's championships
- Won the boys' and girls' championships
- Won the men's and boys' championships
- Won the men's and girls' championships
- Won the women's and boys' championships
- Won the women's and girls' championships

Demonstration sport:

- Fewer than four teams participating

UAAP Season	Men's	Women's	Boys'	Girls'
58 (1995–96)	University of the Philippines Diliman	University of the Philippines Diliman		
59 (1996–97)	University of the Philippines Diliman	University of the Philippines Diliman		
60 (1997–98)	Ateneo de Manila University	University of the Philippines Diliman		
61 (1998–99)	University of Santo Tomas	University of Santo Tomas		
62 (1999–00)	University of Santo Tomas	University of the Philippines Diliman		
63 (2000–01)	University of Santo Tomas	University of the Philippines Diliman		
64 (2001–02)	University of Santo Tomas	University of the Philippines Diliman		
65 (2002–03)	University of Santo Tomas	University of the Philippines Diliman		
66 (2003–04)	University of Santo Tomas	University of Santo Tomas		
67 (2004–05)	Ateneo de Manila University	University of the Philippines Diliman		
68 (2005–06)	University of the Philippines Diliman	University of Santo Tomas	Ateneo de Manila University	
69 (2006–07)	University of Santo Tomas	University of the Philippines Diliman	Ateneo de Manila University	
70 (2007–08)	University of the Philippines Diliman	University of the Philippines Diliman	Ateneo de Manila University	
71 (2008–09)	Ateneo de Manila University	University of the Philippines Diliman	Ateneo de Manila University	
72 (2009–10)	Ateneo de Manila University	University of the Philippines Diliman	Ateneo de Manila University	
73 (2010–11)	Ateneo de Manila University	University of Santo Tomas	Ateneo de Manila University	
74 (2011–12)	University of Santo Tomas	University of Santo Tomas	Ateneo de Manila University	
75 (2012–13)	University of Santo Tomas	University of Santo Tomas	University of Santo Tomas	
76 (2013–14)	Ateneo de Manila University	De La Salle University	Ateneo de Manila University	
77 (2014–15)	University of Santo Tomas	University of Santo Tomas	Ateneo de Manila University	
78 (2015–16)	Ateneo de Manila University	University of Santo Tomas	University of Santo Tomas	University of Santo Tomas
79 (2016–17)	University of Santo Tomas	University of Santo Tomas	University of Santo Tomas	University of Santo Tomas
80 (2017–18)	Ateneo de Manila University; University of Santo Tomas	University of Santo Tomas	University of Santo Tomas	University of the East
81 (2018–19)	University of Santo Tomas	University of Santo Tomas	University of Santo Tomas	University of the East
82 (2019–20)	University of Santo Tomas	University of the East	University of Santo Tomas	University of the East
83 (2020–21)	Cancelled due to COVID-19 pandemic			
84 (2021–22)	Not held due to COVID-19 pandemic			
85 (2022–23)	University of Santo Tomas	University of the East	University of Santo Tomas	University of Santo Tomas
86 (2023–24)	University of the Philippines Diliman	University of the East	University of Santo Tomas	University of the East
87 (2024–25)	University of Santo Tomas	University of the East	University of the East	University of the East
88 (2025–26)	University of Santo Tomas	University of Santo Tomas	University of Santo Tomas	University of Santo Tomas

== Number of championships by school ==
School	Men's	Women's	Boys'	Girls'	Total
University of Santo Tomas	17	12	9	4	42
Ateneo de Manila University	8	0	9	0	17
University of the Philippines Diliman	5	12	0	0	17
University of the East	0	4	1	5	10
De La Salle University	0	1	0	0	1
