= UAAP beach volleyball championships =

Volleyball tournament

The University Athletic Association of the Philippines beach volleyball tournament started in SY 2006-07 as a demonstration sport. The event is now held yearly. It is held at the SM Sands by the Bay in Pasay.

== UAAP beach volleyball champions ==
Key
| Indicator | Meaning |
|---|---|
| | Demonstration sport for UAAP Season 69 |
| | School won the championship in four divisions in the same year |
| | School won the championship in three divisions in the same year |
| | School won the championship in two divisions in the same year |
| (#) | Number of titles won at the time |

| UAAP Season | Men's division | Women's division | Boys' division | Girls' division |
|---|---|---|---|---|
| 69 (2006–07) | Far Eastern University (1) | Adamson University (1) | No tournament | |
| 70 (2007–08) | Far Eastern University (2) | Far Eastern University (1) | No tournament | |
| 71 (2008–09) | University of Santo Tomas (1) | Far Eastern University (2) | No tournament | |
| 72 (2009–10) | University of Santo Tomas (2) | Adamson University (2) | No tournament | |
| 73 (2010–11) | Far Eastern University (3) | Adamson University (3) | No tournament | |
| 74 (2011–12) | Far Eastern University (4) | University of Santo Tomas (1) | No tournament | |
| 75 (2012–13) | National University (1) | University of Santo Tomas (2) | No tournament | |
| 76 (2013–14) | National University (2) | Adamson University (4) | No tournament | |
| 77 (2014–15) | National University (3) | University of Santo Tomas (3) | No tournament | |
| 78 (2015–16) | Ateneo de Manila University (1) | De La Salle University (1) | No tournament | |
| 79 (2016–17) | University of Santo Tomas (3) | University of Santo Tomas (4) | No tournament | |
| 80 (2017–18) | National University (4) | University of Santo Tomas (5) | No tournament | |
| 81 (2018–19) | University of Santo Tomas (4) | University of Santo Tomas (6) | No tournament | |
| 82 (2019–20) | University of Santo Tomas (5) | University of Santo Tomas (7) | No tournament | |
| 83 (2020–21) | Cancelled due to COVID-19 pandemic | | | |
| 84 (2021–22) | University of Santo Tomas (6) | Not held due to COVID-19 pandemic | | |
| 85 (2022–23) | University of Santo Tomas (7) | University of Santo Tomas (8) | Far Eastern University (1) | University of Santo Tomas (1) |
| 86 (2023–24) | University of Santo Tomas (8) | University of Santo Tomas (9) | National University (1) | University of Santo Tomas (2) |
| 87 (2024–25) | University of Santo Tomas (9) | National University (1) | University of Santo Tomas (1) | National University (1) |
| 88 (2025–26) | University of Santo Tomas (10) | University of Santo Tomas (10) | University of Santo Tomas (2) | University of Santo Tomas (3) |

== Individual awards ==
=== Most Valuable Player ===
| UAAP Season | Men's division | Women's division | Boys' division | Girls' division |
|---|---|---|---|---|
| 70 (2007–08) | Joshua Alcarde | Wendy Ann Semana | No tournament | |
| 71 (2008–09) | Henry James Pecaña | Anna Camille Abanto | No tournament | |
| 72 (2009–10) | Jayson Ramos | Lizlee Ann Gata | No tournament | |
| 73 (2010–11) | Nestor Molate | Angela Benting | No tournament | |
| 74 (2011–12) | Arvin Avila | Judy Ann Caballejo | No tournament | |
| 75 (2012–13) | Edwin Tolentino | Maruja Banaticla | No tournament | |
| 76 (2013–14) | Edwin Tolentino | Bang Pineda | No tournament | |
| 77 (2014–15) | Josephenry Tipay | Cherry Ann Rondina | No tournament | |
| 78 (2015–16) | Ysrael Wilson Marasigan | Kim Fajardo | No tournament | |
| 79 (2016–17) | Kris Roy Guzman | Cherry Ann Rondina | No tournament | |
| 80 (2017–18) | Bryan Bagunas | Cherry Ann Rondina | No tournament | |
| 81 (2018–19) | Anthony Lemuel Arbasto Jr. | Cherry Ann Rondina | No tournament | |
| 82 (2019–20) | Rancel Varga | Baby Love Barbon | No tournament | |
| 83 (2020–21) | Cancelled due to COVID-19 pandemic | | No tournament | |
| 84 (2021–22) | Rancel Varga | Not held due to COVID-19 pandemic | | |
| 85 (2022–23) | Jaron Requinton | Baby Love Barbon | | |
| 86 (2023–24) | Alche Gupiteo | Gen Eslapor | John Wayne Dionela and Rain Skyler Gemarino | Khy Progella |
| 87 (2024–25) | Dominique Gabito | Honey Grace Cordero | John Lagaran | Vilmarie Toos |
| 88 (2025–26) | Alche Gupiteo | Khylem Progella | Karl Escobar | Cheng Dadang |

=== Rookie of the Year ===
| UAAP Season | Men's division | Women's division | Boys' division | Girls' division |
|---|---|---|---|---|
| 70 (2007–08) | | Shaira Gonzales | No tournament | |
| 71 (2008–09) | Mico Lucindo | Melissa Gohing | No tournament | |
| 72 (2009–10) | John Paul Pareja | Maruja Banaticla | No tournament | |
| 73 (2010–11) | | | No tournament | |
| 74 (2011–12) | Ysrael Wilson Marasigan | Camille Mary Arielle Cruz | No tournament | |
| 75 (2012–13) | Justin Roque | | No tournament | |
| 76 (2013–14) | Kris Roy Guzman | Kyla Llana Atienza | No tournament | |
| 77 (2014–15) | Edward Camposano | Rica Jane Rivera | No tournament | |
| 78 (2015–16) | Jude Garcia | Jasmine Nabor | No tournament | |
| 79 (2016–17) | Jeremiah Barrica | Caitlin Viray | No tournament | |
| 80 (2017–18) | | | No tournament | |
| 81 (2018–19) | Jaron Requinton | Baby Love Barbon | No tournament | |
| 82 (2019–20) | James Buytrago | Justine Ylizyeth Jazareno | No tournament | |
| 83 (2020–21) | Cancelled due to COVID-19 pandemic | | No tournament | |
| 84 (2021–22) | Noel Kampton | Not held due to COVID-19 pandemic | | |
| 85 (2022–23) | Jian Matthew Salarzon | Honey Grace Cordero | | |
| 86 (2023–24) | | Sofia Pagara | | Khy Progella |
| 87 (2024–25) | Rain Gemarino | Khylem Progella | Luis Papa | Ellaine Gonzalvo |
| 88 (2025–26) | Christian Salboro | Kristine Smile iquio | Prince Jimenez | |

== Number of championships by school ==
| University | Seniors' | | Juniors' | | Total |
| University | M | W | B | G | Total |
|---|---|---|---|---|---|
| University of Santo Tomas | 10 | 10 | 2 | 3 | 25 |
| Far Eastern University | 4 | 2 | 1 | 0 | 7 |
| National University | 4 | 1 | 1 | 1 | 7 |
| Adamson University | 0 | 4 | 0 | 0 | 4 |
| De La Salle University | 0 | 1 | 0 | 0 | 1 |
| Ateneo de Manila University | 1 | 0 | 0 | 0 | 1 |
| University of the East | 0 | 0 | 0 | 0 | 0 |
| University of the Philippines Diliman | 0 | 0 | 0 | 0 | 0 |

== See also ==
- UAAP Volleyball Championship
- NCAA Beach Volleyball Championship (Philippines)
