= UAAP baseball championships =

Baseball championship

UAAP Baseball
- Sport: Baseball
- Founded: 1938
- No. of teams: 10 teams: 6 - Seniors; 4 - Juniors
- Most recent champions: Season 85 Seniors – De La Salle Green Archers Juniors – PAREF Southridge School
- Most titles: Seniors – UST Golden Sox (24 titles) Juniors – De La Salle Green Archers (4 titles)

Baseball in the University Athletic Association of the Philippines (UAAP) has always been held as a men's tournament.

Six teams are participating in the seniors division while there are four teams in the juniors division.

Baseball is among the initial sports contested at the UAAP since its inception in 1938. Baseball was added as a demonstration sport for the junior division in Season 74 (2011–12) as there were only three teams participating. In Season 80 (2017–18), it was elevated to a regular sport since the number of participating teams increased to four.

== List of champions ==
=== Championship titles before the formation of juniors' division (1938–2011) ===
UAAP Season	Seniors' division
1 (1938–39)	University of the Philippines Diliman
2 (1939–40)	University of the Philippines Diliman; University of Santo Tomas
3 (1940–41)	University of Santo Tomas
4 (1941–42)	Not held during World War II.
5 (1942–43)	Not held during World War II.
6 (1943–44)	Not held during World War II.
7 (1944–45)	Not held during World War II.
8 (1945–46)	Not held during World War II.
9 (1946–47)	University of Santo Tomas
10 (1947–48)	Far Eastern University
11 (1948–49)	University of Santo Tomas
12 (1949–50)	University of Santo Tomas
13 (1950–51)	University of Santo Tomas
14 (1951–52)	University of Santo Tomas
15 (1952–53)	Far Eastern University
16 (1953–54)	University of Santo Tomas
17 (1954–55)	Far Eastern University
18 (1955–56)	University of Santo Tomas
19 (1956–57)	Far Eastern University
20 (1957–58)	University of Santo Tomas
21 (1958–59)	University of Santo Tomas
22 (1959–60)	Far Eastern University
23 (1960–61)	Manila Central University
24 (1961–62)	Not Held
25 (1962–63)	Far Eastern University

UAAP Season	Seniors' division
26 (1963–64)	Far Eastern University
27 (1964–65)	University of Santo Tomas
28 (1965–66)	National University
29 (1966–67)	National University
30 (1967–68)	University of the East
31 (1968–69)	University of Santo Tomas
32 (1969–70)	University of the East
33 (1970–71)	Far Eastern University; University of the East
34 (1971–72)	University of the East
35 (1972–73)	Not Held
36 (1973–74)	Far Eastern University
37 (1974–75)	Far Eastern University
38 (1975–76)	Far Eastern University
39 (1976–77)	Far Eastern University
40 (1977–78)	Far Eastern University; University of the Philippines Diliman
41 (1978–79)	University of the Philippines Diliman
42 (1979–80)	University of the Philippines Diliman
43 (1980–81)	University of the Philippines Diliman
44 (1981–82)	University of the Philippines Diliman
45 (1982–83)	University of Santo Tomas
46 (1983–84)	University of Santo Tomas
47 (1984–85)	University of Santo Tomas
48 (1985–86)	University of Santo Tomas
49 (1986–87)	Adamson University
50 (1987–88)	Adamson University

UAAP Season	Seniors' division
51 (1988–89)	University of Santo Tomas
52 (1989–90)	Adamson University
53 (1990–91)	University of Santo Tomas
54 (1991–92)	Adamson University
55 (1992–93)	Adamson University
56 (1993–94)	Adamson University
57 (1994–95)	University of Santo Tomas
58 (1995–96)	De La Salle University
59 (1996–97)	University of Santo Tomas
60 (1997–98)	Adamson University
61 (1998–99)	Adamson University
62 (1999–00)	De La Salle University
63 (2000–01)	University of the Philippines Diliman
64 (2001–02)	University of the Philippines Diliman
65 (2002–03)	De La Salle University
66 (2003–04)	University of the Philippines Diliman
67 (2004–05)	University of Santo Tomas
68 (2005–06)	University of the Philippines Diliman
69 (2006–07)	University of Santo Tomas
70 (2007–08)	Adamson University
71 (2008–09)	Adamson University
72 (2009–10)	Adamson University
73 (2010–11)	University of Santo Tomas

=== Championship titles after the inclusion of juniors' division (2011–present) ===
UAAP Season	Men's division (Seniors' division before UAAP Season 82)	High School division (Juniors' division before UAAP Season 82)
74 (2011–12)	National University	De La Salle Zobel
75 (2012–13)	Ateneo de Manila University	Ateneo de Manila University
76 (2013–14)	Ateneo de Manila University	De La Salle Zobel
77 (2014–15)	Ateneo de Manila University	De La Salle Zobel
78 (2015–16)	De La Salle University	Ateneo de Manila University
79 (2016–17)	Ateneo de Manila University	De La Salle Zobel
80 (2017–18)	Adamson University	University of Santo Tomas
81 (2018–19)	De La Salle University	Ateneo de Manila University
82 (2019–20)	Cancelled due to COVID-19 pandemic	University of Santo Tomas
83 (2020–21)	Cancelled due to COVID-19 pandemic	
84 (2021–22)	Not held due to COVID-19 pandemic	
85 (2022–23)	De La Salle University	No tournament
86 (2023–24)	National University	No tournament
87 (2024–25)	National University	No tournament
88 (2025–26)	National University	PAREF Southridge School

demonstration sport

== Number of championships by school ==
School	Seniors' division	Juniors' division	Total
University of Santo Tomas	24	2	26
Far Eastern University	13	0	13
Adamson University	12	0	12
University of the Philippines Diliman	11	0	11
De La Salle University	6	4	10
Ateneo de Manila University	4	3	7
National University	6	0	6
University of the East	4	0	4
PAREF Southridge School (guest)	0	1	1
Manila Central University*	1	0	1

*School withdrew from the UAAP in 1962.
