= UAAP 3x3 basketball championships =

Basketball tournaments

UAAP 3x3 basketball
- Sport: 3x3 basketball
- First season: UAAP Season 80
- No. of teams: 8
- Most recent champions: M: De La Salle Green Archers; W: Ateneo Blue Eagles (UAAP Season 87)
- Tournament format: Final four

The University Athletic Association of the Philippines (UAAP) holds its two-day 3x3 basketball tournaments on first week of March. It was inaugurated as a demonstration event for seniors' division in UAAP Season 80 in 2018.

At the opening press conference of UAAP Season 82 in 2019, the UAAP Board announced that 3x3 basketball would become an official sport as of the said season for both men and women.

== Format ==
=== Debut format ===
3x3 basketball made its debut in UAAP Season 80 using the group stage format. The elimination round would be divided into two groups of three to four teams each. Each team will play the teams in its group once. The top two teams per group qualify for the semifinals. The higher-seed team of a group faces the lower-seeded team of the other group in one-game semifinals match. The semifinals winners advance to the final, which is also a one-game matchup.

=== Final four format ===
The tournament currently uses the Final Four format, first implemented on its second year in UAAP Season 81. The tournament begins with a single round-robin elimination, where a team plays the other teams once to determine which teams will qualify for the semifinals. The top four finishers enter the Final Four phase. Semifinals and final stages are played in a single game.

== Tournament results ==
Table key

Adamson	Adamson University
Ateneo	Ateneo de Manila University
La Salle	De La Salle University
FEU	Far Eastern University
NU	National University

UE	University of the East
UP	University of the Philippines Diliman
UST	University of Santo Tomas
(#)	Number of tournaments won at the time
Season^	Was held as demonstration event

Season	Year	Host school	Men's division			Women's division			Ref.
Season	Year	Host school	(gold) Gold	(silver) Silver	(bronze) Bronze	(gold) Gold	(silver) Silver	(bronze) Bronze	Ref.
80^	2018	Far Eastern University	FEU (1)	UE (1)	La Salle (1); NU (1)	NU (1)	Adamson (1)	Ateneo (1); UST (1)	
81^	2019	National University	Ateneo (1)	UST (1)	UP (1)	NU (2)	Adamson (2)	UST (2)	
82	2020	Ateneo de Manila University	Cancelled due to COVID-19 pandemic			Cancelled due to COVID-19 pandemic			
83	2021	De La Salle University	Cancelled due to COVID-19 pandemic			Cancelled due to COVID-19 pandemic			
84	2022	De La Salle University	UST (1)	La Salle (1)	UP (2)	NU (3)	UST (1)	UP (1)	
85	2023	Adamson University	La Salle (1)	Adamson (1)	NU (2)	UST (1)	NU (1)	Ateneo (2)	
86	2024	University of the East	La Salle (2)	UE (2)	NU (3)	UST (2)	NU (2)	La Salle (1)	
87	2025	University of the Philippines	La Salle (3)	UST (2)	Adamson (1)	Ateneo (1)	FEU (1)	UST (3)	

== Medal table ==
The table is pre-sorted by the name of each university, but can be displayed as sorted by any other column, such as the total number of gold medals or total number of overall medals. To sort by gold, silver, and then bronze, sort first by the bronze column, then the silver, and then the gold.

Medal totals in this table are current as of UAAP Season 87.

	Men's division				Women's division				Combined total			
Team	1st place, gold medalist(s)	2nd place, silver medalist(s)	3rd place, bronze medalist(s)	Total	1st place, gold medalist(s)	2nd place, silver medalist(s)	3rd place, bronze medalist(s)	Total	1st place, gold medalist(s)	2nd place, silver medalist(s)	3rd place, bronze medalist(s)	Total
Adamson University	0	1	1	2	0	2	0	2	0	3	1	4
Ateneo de Manila University	1	0	0	1	1	0	2	3	2	0	2	4
De La Salle University	3	1	1	5	0	0	1	1	3	1	2	6
Far Eastern University	1	0	0	1	0	1	0	1	1	1	0	2
National University	0	0	3	3	3	2	0	5	3	2	3	8
University of the East	0	2	0	2	0	0	0	0	0	2	0	2
University of the Philippines Diliman	0	0	2	2	0	0	1	1	0	0	3	3
University of Santo Tomas	1	2	0	3	2	1	3	5	3	3	3	9
Totals	6	6	7	19	6	6	7	19	11	11	13	35

== See also ==
- UAAP Basketball Championship
