= UAAP Softball Championship =

Softball championship

UAAP Softball
- Sport: Softball
- Founded: 1953
- No. of teams: 7
- Most recent champions: Season 88 (2025-26); Adamson Lady Falcons

The UAAP softball championship is a women's softball tournament by the University Athletic Association of the Philippines (UAAP). There is no men's softball tournament.

== History ==
Softball in the UAAP started in 1953. However, there were years when the tournament was not held. It was not held for eight years until the 1984–85 academic school year. Far Eastern University (FEU) reportedly dominated the period before the hiatus, winning twenty titles.

Softball returned in January 1994 as an exhibition tournament. It was supposed to start in November 1993 but was delayed due to the conduct of the 1993 Asian Athletics Championships. The University of the Philippines Lady Maroons were the champions of the event. Softball became a regular event the following season.

== UAAP softball champions ==
UAAP Season	Champion
16 (1953–54)	National University
17 (1954–55)	National University
18 (1955–56)	Manila Central University
19 (1956–57)	Manila Central University
20 (1957–58)	Manila Central University
21 (1958–59)	Manila Central University
22 (1959–60)	Manila Central University
23 (1960–61)	Manila Central University
24 (1961–62)	Manila Central University
25 (1962–63)	University of the East
26 (1963–64)	Far Eastern University
27 (1964–65)	Far Eastern University
28 (1965–66)	Far Eastern University
29 (1966–67)	Far Eastern University
30 (1967–68)	Far Eastern University
31 (1968–69)	Far Eastern University
32 (1969–70)	Far Eastern University
33 (1970–71)	Not played
34 (1971–72)	Not played
35 (1972–73)	Not played
36 (1973–74)	Far Eastern University
37 (1974–75)	Far Eastern University
38 (1975–76)	Far Eastern University
39 (1976–77)	Far Eastern University
40 (1977–78)	Far Eastern University

UAAP Season	Champion
41 (1978–79)	Far Eastern University
42 (1979–80)	Far Eastern University
43 (1980–81)	Far Eastern University
44 (1981–82)	Far Eastern University
45 (1982–83)	Far Eastern University
46 (1983–84)	Far Eastern University
47 (1984–85)	Far Eastern University
48 (1985–86)	Not played
49 (1986–87)	Not played
50 (1987–88)	Not played
51 (1988–89)	Not played
52 (1989–90)	Not played
53 (1990–91)	Not played
54 (1991–92)	Not played
55 (1992–93)	Not played
56 (1993–94)	Not played
57 (1994–95)	Exhibition
58 (1995–96)	University of the Philippines Diliman
59 (1996–97)	University of the Philippines Diliman
60 (1997–98)	Adamson University
61 (1998–99)	Adamson University
62 (1999–00)	Adamson University
63 (2000–01)	Adamson University
64 (2001–02)	University of the Philippines Diliman
65 (2002–03)	University of the East

UAAP Season	Champion
66 (2003–04)	Adamson University
67 (2004–05)	Adamson University
68 (2005–06)	Adamson University
69 (2006–07)	Adamson University
70 (2007–08)	University of the Philippines Diliman
71 (2008–09)	Adamson University
72 (2009–10)	University of Santo Tomas
73 (2010–11)	Adamson University
74 (2011–12)	Adamson University
75 (2012–13)	Adamson University
76 (2013–14)	Adamson University
77 (2014–15)	Adamson University
78 (2015–16)	Adamson University
79 (2016–17)	Adamson University
80 (2017–18)	Adamson University
81 (2018–19)	Adamson University
82 (2019–20)	Cancelled due to COVID-19 pandemic
83 (2020–21)	Cancelled due to COVID-19 pandemic
84 (2021–22)	Not played
85 (2022–23)	Adamson University
86 (2023–24)	Adamson University
87 (2024–25)	Adamson University
88 (2025–26)	Adamson University
89 (2026–27)	
90 (2027–28)	

== Number of championships by school ==
School	Titles
Adamson University	22
Far Eastern University	19
Manila Central University*	7
University of the Philippines Diliman	4
National University	2
University of the East	2
University of Santo Tomas	1
Ateneo de Manila University	0
De La Salle University	0

*School withdrew from the UAAP in Season 25 (1962-63)

== See also ==
- NCAA Philippines Softball Championship
