= UP Fighting Maroons =

Philippine collegiate varsity teams

- School: University of the Philippines Diliman
- League: UAAP
- Joined: 1938 (NCAA founding member – 1924)
- Location: Diliman, Quezon City Philippines
- Team colors: Maroon Forest Green
- Women's team: UP Fighting Maroons
- Juniors' team: UP Fighting Maroons
- Website: upfightingmaroons.x10.mx

Seniors' general championships
- UAAP: 5 1977–78 1978–79 1980–81 1982–83 1997–98

Juniors' general championships
- UAAP: none

The UP Fighting Maroons are the collegiate varsity teams of the University of the Philippines Diliman. The teams play in the University Athletic Association of the Philippines (UAAP), the Philippines' premier college sports league.

UP is one of four member-universities that participate in all 15 sporting events of the league.

== History ==
UP was one of the founding members of the UAAP in 1938. It was also a founding member and the originator of the National Collegiate Athletic Association (NCAA) in the year 1924.

UP is a perennial contender for the overall championship in the UAAP every season. The team last won the UAAP Seniors Overall Championship (now referred to as Collegiate) in the 1997–1998 season, two years before UP last hosted the competitions before its centennial.

The UAAP has eight member-universities and holds tournaments in 13 sports (17 sports disciplines). Only four of the eight member-universities participate in all of the thirteen sports; UP is one of these four.

== Team identity ==
=== Team monikers ===
Prior to the establishment of the NCAA in 1924, the sports press have been referring to the collegiate teams by the color of their uniforms. School varsity teams were called the Blue and Whites, the Red and Whites, the Green and Whites and in the case of UP, the Maroon and Greens. In the late 1930s, schools started to adopt mascots and the sports press would now refer to their varsity teams by the name of their mascots. Sportswriters wrote about the games played by the Blue Eagles, the Green Archers, the Red Lions in their sports articles for their news dailies. In the case of UP, the varsity team was called the UP Parrots when the school adopted the parrot as its mascot. Sometime in the 1990s, the moniker UP Parrots was changed to UP Fighting Maroons when the parrot was dropped as the team mascot. The new moniker revived the old (vintage 1920s) name Maroons, and the adjective "fighting" was added to describe the kind of spirit that the varsity teams of UP have when they participate in the arena of competitive sports.

Aside from Fighting Maroons, which is applicable for all teams, there are other official varsity team names that exist, which are sourced from the school's official student publications. They are as follows: (Note that either UP/UPIS is appended before the team names for the case of the collegiate and high school teams, respectively.)

Sport	Men's team names	Women's team names	Boys' team names	Girls' team names
Basketball/3x3	Fighting Maroons	Fighting Maroons	Junior Fighting Maroons	No team
Football	Fighting Maroons Booters	Fighting Maroons Booters	No team	No team
Volleyball/Beach Volley	Fighting Maroons	Fighting Maroons	Fighting Maroons	Fighting Maroons
Baseball	Fighting Maroons Batters	No Team	No Team	No team
Softball	No team	Fighting Maroons Batters	No team	No team
Badminton	Fighting Maroons Smashers	Fighting Maroons Smashers	No team	No team
Tennis	Maroon Tennis Team	Maroon Tennis Team	No team	No team
Table Tennis	Fighting Maroons Paddlers	Fighting Maroons Paddlers	Junior Fighting Maroons Paddlers	Junior Fighting Maroons Paddlers
Athletics	Fighting Maroons Tracksters	Fighting Maroons Tracksters	Junior Fighting Maroons Tracksters	Junior Fighting Maroons Tracksters
Swimming	Fighting Maroons Tankers	Fighting Maroons Tankers	Junior Fighting Maroons Tankers	Junior Fighting Maroons Tankers
Fencing	Fighting Maroons Fencers	Fighting Maroons Fencers	Junior Fighting Maroons Fencers	No team
Judo	Fighting Maroons Judokas	Fighting Maroons Judokas	No team	No team
Taekwondo (Poomsae/Sparring)	Fighting Maroons Jins	Fighting Maroons Jins	No team	No team
Chess	Fighting Maroons Woodpushers	Fighting Maroons Woodpushers	No team	No team

Note, however, that such student publications are starting to use Fighting Maroons for all teams and just specify the team thus referred to in the lede or in the first mention.

Other varsity teams:

- UP Varsity Pep Squad
- Filipiniana Dance Troupe
- UP Streetdance Club
- UP Esports Varsity Team

=== Team logo ===
The oblation was used in broadcasts as the logo of the UP Fighting Maroons prior to July 2015.

The Secondary Logo

Prior to July 2015, there was no official logo for the UP Fighting Maroons. The University Seal was used in the uniforms of the university's student-athletes. The UP System's registered trademarks such as the Oblation and sometimes the university seal were used to represent the university's varsity team in UAAP broadcasts. A new logo representing the varsity team had to be designed after UP College of Human Kinetics Dean Ronnie Dizer told ABS-CBN Sports, the official broadcaster of the UAAP, that the Oblation logo is no longer allowed in UAAP coverage.

On July 20, 2015, a set of six logos were released by the University of the Philippines. The new main logo uses a clenched left fist as a primary symbol with the teams initials UMP. The logo according to the university highlights the "institution’s unique history and tradition – catalysts for change and defenders of the people.” The letter "M" is incorporated at the bottom part of the fist. The M design of the main logo is named the "M Cut". A partial version of the logo which composes only of the fist with the M Cut of the main logo may be used where the name of the team or the university is not required to be shown.

In addition, an internal, secondary, and tertiary logos were also revealed. The internal logo is in shape of the Oblation, the secondary logo is a geometric shapes arranged in a form of a fist, and the tertiary logo composes of a man and a woman raising and clenching one of their fists, named Isko & Iska. The later two logos, the secondary and tertiary are used for marketing and promotional purposes.

The proposal for the new brand identity was initiated by Mandy Reyes and Pete Jimenez of Nowhere to Go but UP, an alumni organization. The design team is composed of the following: Dan Matutina (along with Bernice de Leon-Yumul, Joanna Malinis, and Raxenne Maniquiz of Plus63 Design Co.), Kay Aranzanso, Ralph Guibani, and AJ Dimarucot.

==== June 20, 2015, leaked proposal ====
The logo, unofficially released on June 15, 2015.

Prior to the July release of the new logos, one of the proposals for a new logo for the UP Fighting Maroons were unofficially released on June 15. The logo released on June 15 features a warrior holding a shield with the inscription "UP" in baybayin on his left hands aiming to throw a spear with his right hand.

The new logo was negatively received by the UP community. UP alumnus and Supreme Court spokesman Atty. Theodore Te criticized the logo and remarked that "There is a reason why there is an Oblation in every UP campus. And so many clenched fists too. That is the spirit behind the Oblation: service and sacrifice; the giving of self. It is the same spirit that moves every UP student and alum to raise a fist or offer a hand and not see any contradiction." Jojo Robles, a columnist at The Standard and another UP alumnus, agreed with Te's comments and implied that the logo violated the trademark of a vinegar manufacturer and called on the manufacturer to sue the designers.

The university clarified that the logo is still to be revised and the final version of the logo was released a month later on June 20, 2015.

== Championships ==
The following table shows the number of championships in the UAAP (and also the NCAA). It can be noted that UP has titles in all but two (beach volleyball and 3x3) of the disciplines in the UAAP program. The University boasts successful swimming and athletics programs, with 35 and 25 titles apiece in the league (38 for swimming and 31 for athletics, if one includes NCAA). UP also holds the most titles in badminton (15) in the UAAP.

=== UAAP ===
Sport	Men's	Women's	Boys'	Girls'	Total	Notes
Swimming	17	17	0	2	36	
Athletics	21	0	4	–	25	
Football	20	1	–		21	
Judo	5	12	0	–	17	
Badminton	5	10			15	
Volleyball	4	8	0	0	12	
Basketball	4	7	1		12	
Baseball	11		–		11	
Table Tennis	3	6	0	0	9	
Tennis	6	0			6	
Fencing	1	5	0	–	6	
Chess	1	3	–	–	4	
Softball		4			4	
Taekwondo Gyeorugi	0	2	0		2	
Taekwondo Poomsae	1				1	
Beach volley	0	0	0	0	0	
3x3	0	0	0	–	0	

Note: Poomsae is a coed event. The most championships in each division are in italics.

=== NCAA ===
Sport	Men's	Women's	Boys'	Girls'	Total	Notes
Basketball	4		3		7	
Swimming	3				3	
Tennis	1	| 0			1	

- Also has six uncategorized team titles in athletics.

Legend:

- Dashes (–) mean no team.
- Black boxes mean no championships were awarded in this event and division. In the case of NCAA, no titles were awarded in the entire time UP was part of the said league.

Streaks

- Current/Active Championship Streak(s):

- Longest Championship Streak(s) (4 years and over):

Women's Badminton – 6 (1995–2000) (UR) ^{1}
Men's Athletics – 5 (1963–1967) and (1975–1979)
Women's Swimming – 5 (2009–2013)
Men's Swimming – 5 (2003–2007) ^{2}
Women's Fencing – 5 (2000–2004)
Baseball – 5 (1977–1981) (UR) ^{3}
Men's Football – 5 (1973–1977) ^{4}

Boys' Athletics – 4 (2010–2013)
Women's Basketball – 4 (1980–1983)
Men's Badminton – 4 (1997–2000)
Women's Judo – 4 (1999–2002 and 2006–2009)
Women's Table Tennis – 4 (1997–2000)
Men's Volleyball – 4 (1977–1980)

- ^1(UR) means UAAP Record.
- ^2The team has another streak from 1996–1999 (4).
- ^3Includes 1 co-championship (1977 with FEU).
- ^4Includes 2 co-championships (both with UST).

Double championships
A double crown is achieved when the collegiate (Men's and Women's) and high school (Boys' and Girls') squads win the championship of the same sport in the same year in the UAAP.

- Collegiate:
  - Badminton: 4 (consecutive: 1997–98, 1998–99, 1999–2000, 2000–01)
  - Swimming: 4 (1993–94, 1997–1998, 2010–2011, 2013–2014)
  - Judo: 3 (consecutive: 1995–96 and 1996–1997, 2007–08)
  - Volleyball: 2 (1977–78, 1979–80)
  - Football: 1 (2015–2016)
  - Baseball/Softball: 1 (2001–2002)
  - Table Tennis: 1 (1998–1999)

These are "double crowns" of a different nature.

- Men's & Boys'
  - Basketball: 2 (NCAA: 1925–26 and 1926–27)
- Men's & Girls'
  - Swimming: 2 (2006–07 and 2007–08)

== Rankings history ==
The following tables show the rankings history of the teams in the UAAP.

=== Collegiate Division ===
- Gold border denotes overall championship season.

Year	MEN'S													
Year	Basketball	Volleyball	Beach volleyball	Swimming	Chess	Table tennis	Tennis	Badminton	Track and field	Fencing	Taekwondo	Judo	Baseball	Football
1996–97	3rd	4th		2nd	2nd	3rd	2nd	3rd	5th	1st ^{C1}	3rd	1st	2nd	6th
1997–98	4th	?		1st	2nd	3rd	1st	3rd	5th	1st ^{C1}	3rd	1st	2nd	6th
1998–99	5th	6th		1st	2nd	1st	1st	1st	5th		3rd	2nd	2nd	3rd
1999–2000							1st							
2000–01							3rd							
2001–02	7th	7th		4th	5th	1st	7th	3rd	8th	7th	7th	6th	3rd	3rd
2002–03	6th	3rd		2nd	6th	2nd	2nd	1st	6th	5th	5th	2nd	2nd	2nd
2003–04	7th	2nd		1st	2nd	2nd	3rd	5th	4th	4th	4th	3rd	1st	2nd
2004–05	5th	2nd		1st	4th	5th	3rd	4th	7th	3rd	6th	2nd	2nd	6th
2005–06	4th ^{C2}	3rd		1st	2nd	3rd	4th	6th	6th	5th	1st	1st	4th	4th
2006–07	6th	2nd	2nd ^{C3}	1st	2nd	3rd	2nd	4th	6th	4th	6th	2nd	4th	3rd
2007–08	8th	4th	8th	1st	3rd	4th	3rd	5th	5th	3rd	5th	1st	3rd	4th
2008–09	6th	2nd	4th	3rd	6th	3rd	3rd	5th	5th	3rd	4th	4th	2nd	1st
2009–10	8th	4th	3rd	4th	5th	3rd	3rd	4th	5th	3rd	4th	3rd	3rd	6th
2010–11	8th	3rd	4th	1st	4th	4th	4th	5th	6th	1st	3rd	4th	6th	1st
2011–12	8th	6th	4th	4th	3rd	5th	4th	6th	6th	3rd	4th	4th	6th	1st
2012–13	8th		5th	3rd		5th		6th	5th	6th	3rd	2nd		
2013–14	8th		4th	1st		6th		4th	3rd		3rd	2nd		
Year	Basketball	Volleyball	Beach volleyball	Swimming	Chess	Table tennis	Tennis	Badminton	Track and field	Fencing	Taekwondo	Judo	Baseball	Football

Year	WOMEN'S													
Year	Basketball	Volleyball	Beach volleyball	Swimming	Chess	Table tennis	Tennis	Badminton	Track and field	Fencing	Taekwondo	Judo	Softball	Football
1996–97	4th	3rd		2nd		1st	2nd	1st	5th	1st ^{C1}	3rd	1st	1st	5th
1997–98		3rd										1st		
1998–99	3rd	5th		2nd	2nd	1st		1st	6th		4th	2nd	3rd	3rd
1999–2000		5th												
2000–01		4th												
2001–02	3rd	4th		5th	2nd	2nd	7th	4th	7th	3rd	5th	5th	3rd	6th
2002–03	4th	4th		3rd	4th	3rd	3rd	4th		1st	1st	1st	3rd	4th
2003–04	2nd	5th		3rd	1st	3rd	3rd	3rd	7th	1st	2nd	2nd	4th	4th
2004–05	4th	6th		3rd	1st	7th	4th	5th	6th	1st	3rd	1st	5th	2nd
2005–06	3rd	7th		2nd	2nd	5th	3rd	4th	7th	3rd	2nd	2nd	2nd	4th
2006–07	4th	6th	7th ^{C3}	2nd	3rd	3rd	2nd	3rd	4th	2nd	2nd	1st	2nd	3rd
2007–08	2nd	5th	8th	3rd	3rd	3rd	4th	4th	5th	3rd	2nd	1st	1st	5th
2008–09	2nd	7th	8th	2nd	4th	3rd	4th	6th	5th	2nd	3rd	1st	4th	5th
2009–10	5th	6th	7th	1st	4th	5th	4th	5th	5th	4th	4th	1st	3rd	4th
2010–11	6th	7th	7th	1st	4th	4th	3rd	5th	6th	5th	4th	2nd	4th	5th
2011–12	7th	8th	7th	1st	2nd	1st	3rd	5th	4th	4th	3rd	2nd	2nd	4th
2012–13	7th		4th	1st		2nd		6th	5th	6th	4th	2nd		
2013–14	6th		8th	1st		1st		3rd	4th		2nd	5th		
Year	Basketball	Volleyball	Beach volleyball	Swimming	Chess	Table tennis	Tennis	Badminton	Track and field	Fencing	Taekwondo	Judo	Softball	Football

Year	COED
Year	Poomsae
2013–14	2nd
2014–15	1st
2015–16	2nd
2016–17	3rd
2017–18	4th
2018–19	3rd
2019–20	3rd
2021–22	4th
2022–23	5th

- ^C1Fencing and Women's Tennis were demonstration sports in 1996–97, and is not included in the calculation of points for the overall championship.
- ^C2This placing is due to forfeiture of La Salle games. See UAAP Season 68 for details.
- ^C3Beach volleyball was a demonstration sport in 2006–07, and is not included in the calculation of points for the overall championship.

=== High School Division ===
Year	BOYS										GIRLS			
Year	Basketball	Volleyball	Swimming	Chess	Table tennis	Football	Taekwondo	Track and field	Judo	Fencing	Volleyball	Swimming	Fencing	Table tennis
1996–97	6th	4th	6th	–	6th		?	5th			2nd	5th		
2006–07	4th	4th	4th	–	3rd		3rd	3rd	–		3rd	1st		
2007–08	7th	5th	4th	–	5th	–	3rd	3rd	–		4th	1st		
2008–09	8th	6th	5th	–	4th	–	4th	2nd	–		4th	3rd		
2009–10	8th	6th	5th	8th	6th	–	–	1st	5th	4th	4th	3rd		
2010–11	8th	6th	5th	–	6th	–	–	1st	–	4th	3rd	4th		
2011–12	7th	6th	5th	–	5th	–	–	1st	5th	4th	4th	3rd		
2012–13	6th	5th	5th	–	7th	–	–	1st	–	–	5th	3rd	–	
2013–14	7th	7th	5th	–	8th	–	–	3rd	–	5th	6th	4th	–	
2014–15	7th	7th	4th	–	5th	–	–	–	–	7th	2nd	–	–	
2015–16	6th	7th	5th	–	8th	–	–	3rd	–	6th	7th	3rd	–	5th
2016–17	6th	8th	6th	–	8th	–		1st	6th		7th	3rd	–	–
2017–18	7th	8th	5th	–	–	–	–		–	7th		–	–	–
2018–19	8th	8th	5th	–	8th	–	–	–	–	_	–	3rd	–	–
2019–20	8th	–	4th	–	–	–	–	–	–	–	7th	2nd	–	6th

== Team sports ==
=== Basketball ===
UP Fighting Maroons Season 84 Championship Team

- Ricci Rivero (co-captain)
- Noah Webb (co-captain)
- Carl Tamayo (Season 84 ROY and Mythical Team Selection)
- Zavier Lucero (Season 84 Mythical Team Selection)
- Maodo Malick Diouf (Season 84 Finals MVP)
- JD Cagulangan
- CJ Cansino
- James Spencer
- Gerry Abadiano
- Harold Alarcon
- Terrence Fortea
- Bismarck Lina
- Brix Ramos
- CJ Catapusan
- RC Calimag
- Anton Eusebio
- Henry Galinato Jr. (reserve)
- AJ Madrigal (reserve)
- Jboy Gob (reserve)
- Alonso Tan (reserve)

==== Notable players ====
- Fort Acuña
- Bright Akhuetie
- Eric Altamirano
- Paul Desiderio
- Bryan Gahol
- Ryan Gregorio
- Yeng Guiao
- Nic Jorge
- Poch Juinio
- Joe Lipa
- Ronnie Magsanoc
- Paolo Mendoza
- Andre Paras
- Benjie Paras
- Kobe Paras
- Bo Perasol
- Mikee Reyes
- Ricci Rivero
- Carl Tamayo

=== Volleyball ===
==== Notable players ====
Women

- Jed Montero
- Kathy Bersola
- Tots Carlos
- Pia Cayetano
- Ayel Estrañero
- Isa Molde
- Nicole Tiamzon
- Marian Buitre
- Angeli Araneta
- Lorie Bernardo

Men

- Lino Cayetano
- Kiko Pangilinan
- Lloyd Belgado
- Evan Raymundo
- Alfred Valbuena
- Wendel Miguel
- Jeffrey Lansangan

=== Football ===
The UP Fighting Maroons' men's and women's football teams clinched the university's first-ever double in the UAAP in Season 78 to close out UP's hosting year with a bang.

They have an artificial football pitch venue called the UP Diliman Football Stadium or the UP Diliman Football Field. Its 68 by 105 meters (223 ft × 344 ft) pitch was installed by 2018, and has a grandstand underconstruction.

==== UP Men's Football UAAP Season 86 Championship Team ====
- Macky Tobias (Captain, Best Midfielder)
- Ramil Bation III (Rookie of the Year, Golden Boot)
- Charles Lobitaña
- Giap Boñgolan

- Francis Tacardon (Vice-captain, Season MVP, Best Striker)
- Jose Alfonso Gonzalez
- Liam Lampayan
- Angelo Pagdanganan

=== Beach volleyball ===
The school has men's and women's beach volleyball teams.

=== Softball ===
The UP Fighting Maroons's women's softball team has won four UAAP softball championships: Seasons 58 (1995–96), 59 (1996–97), 64 (2001–02) and 70 (2007–08) They have also won Season 57 (1994–95) where women's softball was first held as an exhibition sports after an eight-year hiatus.

== See also ==
- University Athletic Association of the Philippines (UAAP)
- UAAP Cheerdance Competition
- UP–UST rivalry
