= UAAP Season 83 =

Philippine athletic event

- "Fully Alive. Champions for Life!"
- Host school: De La Salle University
- Status: Cancelled

UAAP Season 83 was the canceled 2020–21 athletic year of the University Athletic Association of the Philippines (UAAP). This season was to be hosted by the De La Salle University. Eight member universities of the UAAP would compete in the league's sixteen sport disciplines to vie for the general championship.

The COVID-19 pandemic in the Philippines caused Season 82, which was supposed to end in May 2020, to be cancelled in April 2020. This had to be done to avoid logistical issues in organizing Season 83, which was planned to open in January 2021 but the plan was scrapped in December 2020, taking into account training that is usually held months prior to the opening of a UAAP season and the imposition of general community quarantine measures in Metro Manila.

== Plans ==
Initial plans were for UAAP Season 83 to retain a full calendar with 15 sports. All events were to be held during the second semester of the 2020–21 academic year, with the basketball and volleyball tournaments, two events that are traditionally conducted in different semesters, to be held simultaneously. However, by December 2020, the possibility of hosting only two tournaments, men's basketball and women's volleyball, deemed "centerpiece events for this season," was being entertained.

== Cancellation ==
The whole season was cancelled on December 11, 2020, to allow for the UAAP's member schools to focus on their academic program as well as their future participation in Season 84. UAAP Season 83 was planned to commence as early as September 2020, but government-restrictions on live classes did not allow for the league to start the season in that month. Prior to the cancellation, there were plans to open the season in April 2021.

== Broadcast ==
The UAAP also announced Cignal TV as its broadcast partner, after its contract with ABS-CBN has expired and not further renewed in light of the latter's franchise expiration. Select games of the now-cancelled UAAP Season 83 was supposed to be aired through, Cignal, One Sports, and other affiliate channels.

== See also ==
- NCAA Season 96
