= UST Growling Tigers, Tigresses, Tiger Cubs and Tigress Cubs =

Varsity team

- School: University of Santo Tomas
- League: UAAP
- Joined: 1938 (NCAA founding member–1924, 1942)
- Location: España Boulevard, Sampaloc, Manila, Philippines
- Team colors: Gold, black, and white
- Juniors' team: Tiger Cubs

Seniors' general championships
- UAAP: 48; 1958–59; 1960–61; 1961–62; 1962–63; 1963–64; 1964–65; 1967–68; 1970–71; 1975–76; 1976–77; 1979–80; 1982–83; 1983–84; 1984–85; 1985–86; 1987–88; 1988–89; 1989–90; 1990–91; 1991–92; 1992–93; 1993–94; 1994–95; 1995–96; 1996–97; 1998–99; 1999–2000; 2000–01; 2001–02; 2002–03; 2003–04; 2004–05; 2005–06; 2006–07; 2007–08; 2008–09; 2009–10; 2010–11; 2011–12; 2014–15; 2016–17; 2017–18; 2018–19; 2019–20; 2021–22; 2022–23; 2023–24; 2024–25

Juniors' general championships
- UAAP: 24; 1995–96; 1996–97; 1997–98; 1998–99; 1999–2000; 2002–03; 2003–04; 2004–05; 2006–07; 2007–08; 2008–09; 2009–10; 2010–11; 2011–12; 2012–13; 2014–15; 2015–16; 2016–17; 2017–18; 2018–19; 2019–20; 2022–23; 2023–24; 2024–25

The UST Growling Tigers, Tigresses, Tiger Cubs and Tigress Cubs are the collegiate and high school men's and women's varsity teams of the University of Santo Tomas (UST) in the University Athletic Association of the Philippines. They hold the most UAAP Overall Championships with 48 senior and 24 junior overall championships.

UST is one of four member universities that participate in all 15 sporting events of the league. They also participate in various sports leagues, such as the Filoil Flying V Preseason Cup, the Premier Volleyball League, the PFF Women's League, and the UNIGAMES.

== Team identity ==
=== Mascot and colors ===
Gold and white: UST's school colors.

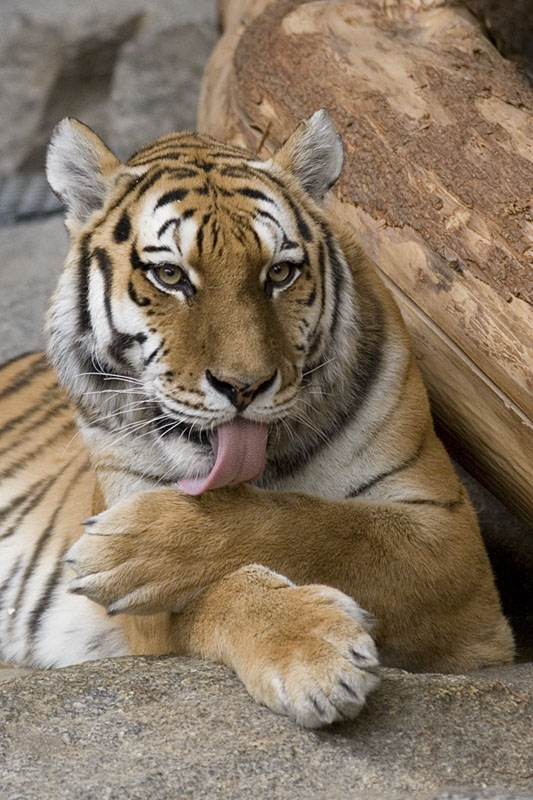
The Bengal tiger's gold, white and black stripes closely resemble UST's school colors. The Growling Tiger has been the school's official mascot since 1992.

The gold and white colors of the flag of Vatican City were adopted by the University of Santo Tomas for their school colors because of its Pontifical status.

They were known as the Glowing Goldies until a name change in 1992. UST Rector Fr. Rolando V. de la Rosa, who was appointed in 1991 recalled in a speech to the school's administrators and faculty members during his 2007 Rector's Report on how UST's present Growling Tigers moniker came to be.

It was during the parade of school mascots in the opening ceremonies of Season 54 (1991–92) when an embarrassing incident occurred. Unlike the other member schools, UST had no mascot to represent their varsity teams and it gave the host school a hard time in coming up with a suitable representation for the Glowing Goldies. A “fat Dominican friar” who was carrying bags of gold had come out with the other mascots and drew a lot of laughter from the crowd in attendance.

Fr. De la Rosa later instructed PE moderator Bro. Rolando Atienza to conduct a naming activity for a new mascot. Mrs. Felicitas Francisco, directress of the PE department, suggested the tiger as the new mascot due to its gold and white colors.

When it was UST's turn to be host in Season 55 (1992–93), the new growling tiger mascot debuted in the opening ceremonies. Since then, Mrs. Francisco always donned her tiger-striped coat when she attends UST playoff games. The High School boys' team followed suit by changing their name from the "Golden Nuggets" to the "Tiger Cubs".

The Manila Central University Purple Owls once used the tiger mascot (with purple and gold colors) when they participated in the UAAP from 1952 until their pullout in 1962.

=== Varsity team monikers ===
The names of the University of Santo Tomas collegiate varsity teams that participate in the 15 UAAP sporting events are shown in the table below.

Sport	Men	Women	Boys	Girls
Basketball	Growling Tigers	Growling Tigresses	Growling Tiger Cubs	Growling Tigress Cubs
Volleyball	Golden Spikers	Golden Tigresses	Junior Golden Spikers	Junior Golden Tigresses
Beach volleyball	Tiger Sands	Lady Spikers	Junior Tiger Sands	Junior Golden Tigresses
Football	Golden Booters	Lady Booters	Junior Golden Booters	No team
Baseball	Golden Sox	No team	Junior Golden Sox	No team
Softball	No team	Softbelles	No team	No team
Judo	Golden Judokas	Lady Judokas	Junior Golden Judokas	Junior Lady Judokas
Taekwondo	Tiger Jins	Lady Jins	Junior Tiger Jins	No team
Fencing	Tiger Fencers	Lady Fencers	Junior Tiger Fencers	Junior Lady Fencers
Swimming	Tiger Sharks	Lady Tiger Sharks	Junior Tiger Sharks	Junior Lady Tiger Sharks
Track and field	Tiger Tracksters	Lady Tracksters	Junior Tiger Tracksters	No team
Badminton	Golden Shuttlers	Lady Shuttlers	No team	No team
Tennis	Tiger Tennisters	Lady Tennisters	No team	No team
Table tennis	Tiger Paddlers	Lady Paddlers	Junior Tiger Paddlers	No team
Chess	Male Woodpushers	Female Woodpushers	Junior Tiger Woodpushers	No team
Arnis	Golden Arnisadors	Lady Arnisadors	Junior Golden Arnisadors	No team
Cheerleading	Salinggawi Dance Troupe		JHS Pep Squad	
Streetdance	Prime		Galvanize	
Esport	Teletigers			

== Basketball ==
The UST men's and boys' basketball teams were first formed in the year of the NCAA's foundation in 1924. UST won their first and only NCAA men's championship in NCAA Season 6 (1930).

In the UAAP, they have the most combined championships with 40 from the men's, women's and boys' teams. The men's total of 18 titles is tied with the UE Red Warriors' for the second most championships behind FEU's 20.

In 1993 the Growling Tigers finished the double-round eliminations with a rare 14–0 sweep and were declared automatic champions of the UAAP Season 56 men's tournament. This was the start of the Growling Tigers' four-peat championship run in the UAAP. The Tigers faced and defeated the De La Salle Green Archers for three consecutive finals series.

UST's last championship before the sweep was in 1967 when they were declared co-champions with UE in Season 30.

The Tiger Cubs and the Tigresses also have successful basketball programs with each team having a total of 11 UAAP championships.

In 1994, the men's, women's and juniors' teams won the UAAP Season 57 basketball championship in their respective divisions. This was the only time that a triple championship was achieved in the UAAP. UST also won double championships in Seasons 58 and 69 with the Growling Tigers and the Tigresses winning both their division titles in both years.

UST's off-season training includes participation in summer basketball tournaments. The Tiger Cubs regularly join the MILCU Summer Showcase, Smart City HOOPS, Filoil Flying V Preseason Cup juniors tournament and the PCABL Freego Cup. The Tigresses recently played in the Fr. Martin Cup Summer tournament and Breakdown Basketball Invitational tournament, while the Growling Tigers continue to participate in the MILCU Under-25 tournaments, the PBA D-League, Filoil Flying V Preseason Cup, Breakdown Basketball Invitational, Fr. Martin Cup Summer tournament, the Millennium Open Basketball championship, as well as pocket tournaments in the provinces such as the Kim Lope Asis Invitational Basketball Tournament in Bayugan, the Kadayawan Basketball Invitational in Davao City, and the Republica Cup collegiate tournament in Malolos. They have also competed in the Philippine Collegiate Champions League, an annual postseason tournament for schools that topped their respective leagues.

The UST Tigress Cubs girls' basketball team were declared co-champions with Adamson in Season 82's inaugural exhibition tournament after the deciding Game three of their finals series was cancelled due to the COVID-19 pandemic. The Tigresses finished second in the four-team eliminations with 4 wins and 2 losses behind the Lady Falcons' perfect 6–0 record.

=== UAAP seasons ===
Season	Year	Men	Women	Boys
2	1939	(gold) Champions (Note: Co-champions with FEU & UP)		
3	1940	(gold) Champions		
9	1946	(gold) Champions		
10	1947	(gold) Champions (Note: Co-champions with FEU)		
11	1948	(gold) Champions		
12	1949	(gold) Champions		
13	1950	(silver) Runners-up		
14	1951	(gold) Champions		
15	1952	(gold) Champions		
16	1953	(gold) Champions		
17	1954			(gold) Champions
18	1955	(gold) Champions		
19	1956	(silver) Runners-up		
20	1957	(silver) Runners-up		
22	1959	(gold) Champions		
23	1960	(bronze) 3rd place		
24	1961	(silver) Runners-up		
27	1964	(gold) Champions		
28	1965	(silver) Runners-up		
29	1966	(silver) Runners-up		
30	1967	(gold) Champions (Note: Co-champions with UE)		
31	1968	(silver) Runners-up		
32	1969	(silver) Runners-up		
34	1971	(silver) Runners-up		
39	1976		(silver) Runners-up	
40	1977		(silver) Runners-up	
41	1978		(silver) Runners-up	
42	1979	(silver) Runners-up	(gold) Champions	
43	1980	(silver) Runners-up	(silver) Runners-up	
44	1981		(silver) Runners-up	
45	1982		(silver) Runners-up	(gold) Champions
46	1983		(silver) Runners-up	

Season	Year	Men	Women	Boys
47	1984	(silver) Runners-up	(gold) Champions	
48	1985	(silver) Runners-up	(gold) Champions	
49	1986		(silver) Runners-up	(silver) Runners-up
50	1987		(gold) Champions	(silver) Runners-up
51	1988		(gold) Champions	(silver) Runners-up
52	1989		(gold) Champions	
53	1990		(gold) Champions	
54	1991	(bronze) 3rd place	(silver) Runners-up	
55	1992		(gold) Champions	
56	1993	(gold) Champions (Note: Automatic champions via sweep)	(silver) Runners-up	
57	1994	(gold) Champions	(gold) Champions	(gold) Champions
58	1995	(gold) Champions	(gold) Champions	(silver) Runners-up
59	1996	(gold) Champions		(gold) Champions
60	1997	(bronze) 3rd place		(silver) Runners-up
61	1998			(gold) Champions
62	1999	(silver) Runners-up		(silver) Runners-up
63	2000			(silver) Runners-up
64	2001			(gold) Champions
69	2006	(gold) Champions	(gold) Champions	
70	2007		(bronze) 3rd place	
71	2008		(bronze) 3rd place	
72	2009			(bronze) 3rd place
73	2010		(bronze) 3rd place	(silver) Runners-up
74	2011		(bronze) 3rd place	
75	2012	(silver) Runners-up		(bronze) 3rd place
76	2013	(silver) Runners-up	(bronze) 3rd place	
78	2015	(silver) Runners-up		
80	2016		(bronze) 3rd place	(bronze) 3rd place
81	2017		(bronze) 3rd place	
82	2019	(silver) Runners-up	(silver) Runners-up	
85	2022		(bronze) 3rd place	
86	2023		(gold) Champions	(bronze) 3rd place
87	2024	(bronze) 3rd place	(silver) Runners-up	(gold) Champions
88	2025		(gold) Champions	
Total 1st place		18	13	12 (Note: The UST Nuggets won five UAAP Juniors championships between Seasons 18 & 39)

=== Other tournaments ===
Men

- 1930 NCAA Season 7 – Champions
- 2003 Philippine Collegiate Champions' League – 3rd place (Note: tied with University of the Visayas)
- 2004 Home and Away Invitational League – Runners-up
- 2012 Philippine Collegiate Champions' League – Champions
- 2014 Fr. Martin Cup Summer tournament – Runners-up
- 2015 Fr. Martin Cup Summer tournament – Runners-up
- 2017 32nd Kadayawan Basketball Invitational – Champions
- 2017 7th Kim Lope Asis Invitational tournament – Runners-up
- 2017 Republica Cup Basketball tournament – Runners-up
- 2018 33rd Kadayawan Basketball Invitational – Runners-up
- 2018 8th Kim Lope Asis Invitational tournament – Champions
- 2019 NBA China 5v5 Grand Finals – Runners-up

Women

- 2002 Women's Basketball League – Champions
- 2003 Women's Basketball League – Champions
- 2004 Women's Basketball League – Champions
- 2005 Home and Away Invitational League – Runners-up
- 2005 Women's Basketball League – Champions
- 2006 Women's Basketball League – Champions
- 2013 UNIGAMES – Champions
- 2019 Fr. Martin Cup Summer tournament – Runners-up
- 2019 Breakdown Basketball Invitational Summer Cup – Runners-up

Boys

- 1989 National Secondary Title – Champions
- 2017 MILCU x Got Skills Hard to Guard U17 tournament – Champions
- 2019 12th PCABL Freego Cup – Runners-up

=== Notable players ===
MVP awardees
Season	Year	Men	Women	Boys
15	1952	Ning Ramos		
26	1963	Valentino Rosabal		
29	1966	Danny Florencio		
32	1969	Garry Artajos		
42	1979	Edmund Yee		
56	1993	Dennis Espino		
57	1994	Dennis Espino		Gerard Francisco
58	1995	Chris Cantonjos		
59	1996			Emmerson Oreta
61	1998			Alwyn Espiritu
63	2000			Jun Cortez
64	2001			Jun Cortez
69	2006	Jojo Duncil (Note: Duncil was the Finals MVP. Adamson's Ken Bono was the Season MVP)	Charmaine Canuel (Note: Canuel was the Finals MVP. Ateneo's Cassy Tioseco was the Season MVP)	
70	2007	Jervy Cruz		
71	2008		Marichu Bacaro	
72	2009	Dylan Ababou		
73	2010			Kevin Ferrer
80	2017			CJ Cansino
81	2018		Grace Irebu	
82	2019	Soulémane Chabi Yo	Grace Irebu	

Rookie of the year awardees
Season	Year	Men	Women	Boys
24	1961	Valentino Rosabal		
58	1995	Gerard Francisco		
65	2002			Japs Cuan
72	2009	Jeric Teng		Kevin Ferrer
76	2013			Aaron Reyes
81	2018		Tantoy Ferrer	
82	2019	Mark Nonoy		

== 3x3 basketball ==
The 3x3 basketball competition was introduced in Season 80 as a demonstration sport. UST did not join the men's inaugural contest, but the Growling Tigresses composed of Jhenn Angeles, Angel Anies, Karla Manuel and Carol Sangalang placed third behind the Adamson Lady Falcons and champions NU Lady Bulldogs.

In its second year, the UST Growling Tigers ended up tied with the UP Fighting Maroons and the De La Salle Green Archers at 3 wins and 3 losses behind the undefeated Ateneo Blue Eagles. They were represented by Renzo Subido, Soulémane Chabi Yo, Dave Ando and Rhenz Abando. The women's team of Sai Larosa, Tantoy Ferrer, Lon Rivera and Carol Sangalang also tied UE and Adamson's 4–3 record behind the undefeated and defending champions, the NU Lady Bulldogs.

Beginning in Season 82, the 3x3 competition is set to become an official tournament in the UAAP. The sport, with the participation of all eight UAAP schools will begin in March 2020.

== Volleyball ==
The UST Tiger Spikers have 19 UAAP men's volleyball championships, while the Golden Tigresses have 16 women's volleyball crowns and the Junior Tigresses have six girls' volleyball titles. The Tigresses were champions for seven consecutive years from Seasons 47 thru 53, while both the men's and girls' teams achieved a three-peat in Seasons 70, 71 and 72. The Junior Tiger Spikers have one UAAP crown which they won in Season 80.

The Tiger Spikers also participate in the Spikers' Turf, a preseason league where they finished second in the 2018 Collegiate Conference and third on two occasions in 2016 and 2017. The Golden Tigresses have had better success in the women's preseason tournaments, having won the most titles among collegiate teams in the Premier Volleyball League with six, beginning at the inaugural tournament in 2004 when the league was still known as the Shakey's V-League. The Junior Tigresses have won four championships in the Shakey's Girls' Volleyball League.

The men's team were back-to-back UNIGAMES champions in 2016 and 2017, while the Tigresses have a total of six volleyball championships, beginning in 2009 and capped by a three-peat from 2016 until 2018.

=== UAAP seasons ===
Season	Year	Men	Women	Girls	Boys
15	1952	(gold) Champions			
21	1958	(gold) Champions			
22	1959	(gold) Champions			
26	1963	(gold) Champions			
30	1967	(gold) Champions			
36	1973	(gold) Champions			
37	1974		(gold) Champions		
38	1975		(gold) Champions		
39	1976	(gold) Champions	(gold) Champions		
43	1980		(gold) Champions		
47	1984		(gold) Champions		
48	1985	(gold) Champions	(gold) Champions		
49	1986	(gold) Champions	(gold) Champions		
50	1987		(gold) Champions		
51	1988	(silver) Runners-up	(gold) Champions (Note: Automatic champions via sweep)		
52	1989	(gold) Champions	(gold) Champions		
53	1990	(silver) Runners-up	(gold) Champions		
55	1992	(gold) Champions	(silver) Runners-up		
56	1993		(gold) Champions		
57	1994	(silver) Runners-up	(silver) Runners-up	(bronze) 3rd place	(bronze) 3rd place
58	1995	(gold) Champions	(silver) Runners-up	(silver) Runners-up	
59	1996	(silver) Runners-up	(gold) Champions	(bronze) 3rd place	
60	1997	(silver) Runners-up	(gold) Champions	(silver) Runners-up	(silver) Runners-up

Season	Year	Men	Women	Girls	Boys
61	1998	(gold) Champions		(silver) Runners-up	(silver) Runners-up
62	1999	(silver) Runners-up	(silver) Runners-up	(silver) Runners-up	(silver) Runners-up
63	2000	(gold) Champions			(bronze) 3rd place
64	2001	(silver) Runners-up		(silver) Runners-up	(bronze) 3rd place
65	2002	(gold) Champions	(bronze) 3rd place	(silver) Runners-up	(bronze) 3rd place
66	2003		(bronze) 3rd place	(gold) Champions	(bronze) 3rd place
67	2004		(silver) Runners-up	(gold) Champions	(bronze) 3rd place
68	2005	(silver) Runners-up		(silver) Runners-up	(silver) Runners-up
69	2006	(bronze) 3rd place	(gold) Champions	(gold) Champions	(silver) Runners-up
70	2007	(gold) Champions	(bronze) 3rd place	(silver) Runners-up	
71	2008	(gold) Champions	(bronze) 3rd place	(gold) Champions	(bronze) 3rd place
72	2009	(gold) Champions	(gold) Champions	(gold) Champions	(silver) Runners-up
73	2010	(gold) Champions	(silver) Runners-up		(silver) Runners-up
74	2011	(silver) Runners-up	(bronze) 3rd place	(bronze) 3rd place	(silver) Runners-up
75	2012			(bronze) 3rd place	
76	2013			(gold) Champions	(bronze) 3rd place
77	2014	(bronze) 3rd place		(silver) Runners-up	
78	2015			(silver) Runners-up	(silver) Runners-up
79	2016		(bronze) 3rd place	(silver) Runners-up	(silver) Runners-up
80	2017			(silver) Runners-up	(gold) Champions
81	2018		(silver) Runners-up	(bronze) 3rd place	(bronze) 3rd place
82	2019			(bronze) 3rd place	
Total 1st place		19	16	6	1

=== Other tournaments ===
Men

- 1989 PAVA National Collegiate – Champions
- 2008 UNIGAMES – Champions
- 2009 UNIGAMES – Champions
- 2011 UNIGAMES – Runners-up
- 2012 UNIGAMES – 3rd place
- 2016 Spikers' Turf Collegiate Conference – 3rd place
- 2017 PVL Collegiate Conference – 3rd place
- 2017 UNIGAMES – Champions
- 2018 UNIGAMES – Champions
- 2018 PVL Collegiate Conference – Runners-up

Girls

- 2009 Shakey's G-League – Champions
- 2013 Shakey's G-League – Runners-up
- 2015 Toby's Sports-Wilson Volleyball League – Champions
- 2016 Shakey's G-League – Champions

Women

- 1985 PAVA National Collegiate – Champions
- 1986 PAVA National Collegiate – Champions
- 1987 PAVA National Collegiate – Champions
- 1988 PAVA National Collegiate – Champions
- 1989 PAVA National Collegiate – Champions
- 2004 Shakey's V-League 1st Conference – Champions
- 2007 Shakey's V-League 1st Conference – Champions
- 2007 Shakey's V-League 2nd Conference – Champions
- 2008 UNIGAMES – 3rd place
- 2009 Shakey's V-League 1st Conference – Champions
- 2009 Shakey's V-League 2nd Conference – Champions
- 2009 UNIGAMES – Champions
- 2010 Shakey's V-League 1st Conference – Champions
- 2010 UNIGAMES – Champions
- 2013 UNIGAMES – Champions
- 2016 UNIGAMES – Champions
- 2017 UNIGAMES – Champions
- 2018 UNIGAMES – Champions
- 2019 UNIGAMES – 3rd place

=== Notable players ===
MVP awardees
Season	Year	Men	Women	Girls
59	1996		Roxanne Pimentel	
60	1997		Johanna Botor	
61	1998	Oliver John Manlapaz		
65	2002	Anthony Irvin Guiao		
69	2006		Venus Bernal	
70	2007	Nazareno Roque		Alyssa Valdez
71	2008	Ray Karl Dimaculangan		Alyssa Valdez
72	2009	Henry James Pecaña (Note: Pecaña was the Finals MVP. Ateneo's AJ Pareja was the Season MVP)	Rhea Dimaculangan (Note: Dimaculangan was the Finals MVP. FEU's Cherry Mae Vivas was the Season MVP)	Alyssa Valdez
73	2010	John Paul Torres (Note: Torres was the Season MVP); Jayson Ramos (Note: Ramos was the Finals MVP)		
74	2011	Jayson Ramos		
75	2012	Mark Gil Alfafara		
76	2013			EJ Laure
78	2015			Eya Laure
81	2018		Sisi Rondina	

Rookie of the year awardees
Season	Year	Men	Women	Girls	Boys
67	2004		Mary Jean Balse		
68	2005		Lilet Mabbayad		
69	2006	Marlon Macabulos			
70	2007	Jayson Ramos			
71	2008			Jelly Buan	
72	2009			Jaja Santiago	
75	2012			Eya Laure	
77	2014		EJ Laure		
80	2017		Milena Alessandrini		CJ Segui
81	2018		Eya Laure		
82	2019			Ela Raagas	
86	2023		Angeline Poyos		

== Beach volleyball ==
The UAAP beach volleyball competition was introduced as a demonstration sport in Season 69 and was made into an official sport in Season 72. The UST Tiger Sands men's team who were formerly called the Tiger Spikers won the tournament in Season 71, while the women's team had two unofficial third place finishes in Seasons 69 and 71.

The Lady Spikers won their first championship in Season 74 after defeating Ateneo in the finals. In 2014, Sisi Rondina and Rica Rivera won the Season 77 championship in their rookie year. The Lady Spikers were defeated by Adamson the previous year. Rondina, who was named MVP that year went on to win three more championships and the same number of MVP awards until Season 81.

The Lady Spikers made history by winning their fourth-straight UAAP beach volleyball championship in Season 82. They hold the most UAAP titles won with seven. They won back-to-back championships in 2011 and 2012 and then they went on to achieve a four-peat from 2016 to 2019 with an undefeated 27–0 win–loss record.

The Tiger Sands have a total of five championships, having won back-to-back in Seasons 81 and 82.

=== UAAP seasons ===
Season	Year	Men	Women
69	2006		(bronze) 3rd place (Note: Beach volleyball was a demonstration sport from Seasons 69 to 71)
70	2007	(bronze) 3rd place	
71	2008	(gold) Champions	(bronze) 3rd place
72	2009	(gold) Champions	
73	2010	(silver) Runners-up	
74	2011	(silver) Runners-up	(gold) Champions
75	2012		(gold) Champions
76	2013	(silver) Runners-up	(silver) Runners-up
77	2014	(silver) Runners-up	(gold) Champions
78	2015	(silver) Runners-up	
79	2016	(gold) Champions	(gold) Champions
80	2017	(silver) Runners-up	(gold) Champions
81	2018	(gold) Champions	(gold) Champions
82	2019	(gold) Champions	(gold) Champions
Total 1st place		5	7

=== Other tournaments ===
Men

- 2008 UNIGAMES – Runners-up
- 2017 Beach Volleyball Republic Invitational – Champions
- 2018 Beach Volleyball Republic on Tour Manila Open – Champions
- 2019 Rebisco Beach Volleyball Open tournament – Champions

Women

- 2012 Ibalong Festival Beach Volleyball Open Conference – Champions
- 2013 Ibalong Festival Beach Volleyball Open Conference – Champions
- 2013 Nestea Beach Intercollegiate competition – Runners-up
- 2014 Ibalong Festival Beach Volleyball Open Conference – Champions
- 2015 Ibalong Festival Beach Volleyball Open Conference – Champions
- 2015 Nestea Beach Volleyball Intercollegiate competition – Champions
- 2016 Nestea Beach Volleyball Intercollegiate competition – Champions
- 2017 Beach Volleyball Republic Women's Collegiate, Bracket A – Champions
- 2018 UNIGAMES – Champions
- 2018 Beach Volleyball Republic on Tour Manila Open – Champions
- 2019 Beach Volleyball Republic on Tour Dumaguete Open – Champions
- 2019 Ibalong National Beach Volleyball Open Invitational – Champions
- 2019 UNIGAMES – Champions

=== Notable players ===
MVP awardees
Season	Year	Men	Women
71	2008	Henry James Pecaña	
72	2009	Jayson Ramos	
74	2011		Judy Caballejo
75	2012		Maruja Banaticla
77	2014		Sisi Rondina
79	2016	Kris Roy Guzman	Sisi Rondina
80	2017		Sisi Rondina
81	2018	Anthony Lemuel Arbasto, Jr.	Sisi Rondina
82	2019	Rancel Varga	Babylove Barbon

Season	Year	Men	Women
72	2009		Maruja Banaticla
76	2013	Kris Roy Guzman	
77	2014		Rica Rivera
79	2016		Caitlyn Viray
81	2018	Jaron Requinton	Babylove Barbon

== Football ==
The formation of UST's football team dates back to the early days of the NCAA. The Golden Booters have a combined total of 35 NCAA and UAAP championships. They won four straight NCAA titles from 1926 until 1929. The men's team who were sparringly called the Growling Booters and the Tiger Booters achieved a three-peat in the UAAP from 1991 to 1993. They last won the championship in 2006.

The Golden Booters made it back to the finals and ended up as runners-up to the undefeated UP Maroon Booters in Season 80. Before Season 77, UST had only missed the playoffs once in a span of 13 years.

The UST Lady Booters won their first UAAP title in 2009, 14 years after women's football became an official sport in the league. They won the championship again in 2011.

The Juniors team that plays in a small pool of four teams (the number of competing schools increased to five with the entry of Nazareth School in Season 80) have yet to get a podium finish since boys' football became a regular sport in UAAP Season 72.

UST's off-season training includes participation in the UNIGAMES, Ang Liga, the PFF Women's League, the Pinas Cup, and the Metro Manila Girls Football Association.

=== UAAP seasons ===
Season	Year	Men	Women
1	1938	(gold) Champions	
50	1987	(gold) Champions	
52	1989	(silver) Runners-up	
53	1990	(bronze) 3rd place	
54	1991	(gold) Champions (Note: Co-champions with La Salle)	
55	1992	(gold) Champions	
56	1993	(gold) Champions	
57	1994	(silver) Runners-up	
58	1995	(bronze) 3rd place	
59	1996	(bronze) 3rd place	
60	1997	(bronze) 3rd place	
61	1998	(silver) Runners-up	
62	1999	(gold) Champions	(silver) Runners-up
63	2000	(bronze) 3rd place	(bronze) 3rd place
64	2001	(silver) Runners-up	
65	2002		(silver) Runners-up

Season	Year	Men	Women
66	2003	(bronze) 3rd place	(bronze) 3rd place
67	2004	(silver) Runners-up	(bronze) 3rd place
68	2005	(bronze) 3rd place	(silver) Runners-up
69	2006	(gold) Champions	(silver) Runners-up
70	2007	(bronze) 3rd place	(bronze) 3rd place
71	2008		(gold) Champions
72	2009	(silver) Runners-up	(silver) Runners-up
73	2010	(silver) Runners-up	(silver) Runners-up
74	2011	(silver) Runners-up	(gold) Champions
75	2012		(bronze) 3rd place
76	2013	(bronze) 3rd place	(silver) Runners-up
79	2016		(silver) Runners-up
80	2017	(silver) Runners-up	(silver) Runners-up
81	2018		(bronze) 3rd place
Total 1st place		7	2

=== Other tournaments ===
Men

- 1926 NCAA Season 3 – Champions
- 1927 NCAA Season 4 – Champions
- 1928 NCAA Season 5 – Champions
- 1929 NCAA Season 6 – Champions
- 2004 Ang Liga – Runners-up
- 2016 Ang Liga Season 14 Division 1 – Champions
- 2017 Pinas Cup Men's Open – Champions
- 2018 Pinas Cup Men's Open – Champions
- 2018 Ang Liga Season 16 – Champions
- 2019 Mayor Braeden John Q. Biron Collegiate Invitational – Champions

Women

- 2001 Metro Manila Girls Football Association – Champions
- 2002 Kick Sand Beach Football Open tournament – Champions
- 2002 Chris Monfort Memorial Cup – 3rd place
- 2003 1st Brent Invitational Football tournament – Champions
- 2003 Globe Gentxt Beach Football National finals – Champions
- 2003 Metro Manila Girls Football Association – 3rd place
- 2004 Metro Manila Girls Football Association – 3rd place
- 2004 UNIGAMES – Runners-up
- 2007 1st PFL–Ang Liga Filipina Football – Runners-up
- 2009 Rexona Cup – Champions
- 2009 Metro Manila Girls Football Association – Champions
- 2009 UNIGAMES – Champions
- 2011 UNIGAMES – Runners-up
- 2013 UNIGAMES – Runners-up
- 2013 Pinay Futbol League – Champions
- 2014 PFF Open Women's Cup – 3rd place
- 2017 Philippine Football Federation Women's League – Runners-up
- 2018 Philippine Football Federation Women's League – Runners-up
- 2019 Philippine Football Federation Women's League – Runners-up

=== Notable players ===
MVP awardees
Season	Year	Men	Women
69	2006	Ricardo Becite	
72	2009		Mary Ignacio
74	2011		Marice Magdolot

Rookie of the year awardees

Season	Year	Men	Women
68	2005		Mary Ignacio
69	2006	Mark David Basa	Louella Amamuyo
72	2009	Christian de Juan	Marianne Narciso
73	2010		Pearl Anjanette Aguilar
79	2016		Mary Joy Indac

== Judo ==
The UST Lady Judokas team, headed by Head Coach Gerald Arce is the defending champion of the UAAP Women's Judo competition. The Lady Judokas won five titles in the 6 seasons, having first won in Seasons 73, 74, and 75. After they suffered a 4th-place finish in Season 76, they bounced-back and became the back-to-back champions of the UAAP from Seasons 77 and 78.

== Cheerdance ==
The official Pep Squad and Drumline, the UST Yellow Jackets, and the official dance troupe, the UST Salinggawi Dance Troupe have won the UAAP Cheerdance Competition a league-leading eight times and holds the record for the longest championship run for five consecutive years (2002 to 2006). Their closest rival is the UP Pep Squad, which has been a consistent runner-up until 2007 when they snatched the title by a very thin margin from the Salinggawi Dance Troupe, which finished second.

== See also ==
- UST Salinggawi Dance Troupe
- UST Growling Tigers men's basketball
- UST Golden Tigresses women's volleyball
- UST Golden Spikers volleyball
- UST Yellow Jackets
- UAAP Overall Championship
