= UAAP Season 74 =

- "All Out, All Heart"
- Host school: Ateneo de Manila University

Overall
- Seniors: University of Santo Tomas
- Juniors: University of Santo Tomas

Seniors' champions
Sport		Men	Women
Basketball		Ateneo	FEU
Volleyball		FEU	La Salle
Beach Volleyball		FEU	UST
Football		UP	UST
Baseball		NU	N/A
Softball		N/A	Adamson
Fencing		UST	UE
Swimming		La Salle	UP
Badminton		Ateneo	UE
Chess		FEU	La Salle
Judo		UST	UST
Taekwondo		UST	FEU
Table tennis		UST	UP
Tennis		La Salle	UST
Track and field		FEU	FEU
- Cheerdance: UP (Ex - Coed)
- Street dance: La Salle (Ex - Coed)

Juniors' champions
Sport		Boys	Girls
Basketball		NU	N/A
Volleyball		UE	La Salle
Beach Volleyball		FEU	
Football		La Salle	
Baseball		UE	UE
Softball		Ateneo	UE
Fencing		FEU	
Swimming		Ateneo	
Badminton		UST	
Chess		UE	
Judo		UP	
- (NT) = No tournament; (DS) = Demonstration Sport; (Ex) = Exhibition;

UAAP Season 74 was the 2011–2012 athletic year of the University Athletic Association of the Philippines (UAAP). It was hosted by Ateneo de Manila University. The men's basketball and the women's volleyball tournaments were aired by ABS-CBN Channel 2 and Studio 23 (the men's basketball games are simulcast over DZSR Sports Radio 918) for the twelfth consecutive year. The opening ceremony was held on July 9, 2011 at the Marikina Sports Center.

== Opening ceremonies ==
Season host Ateneo de Manila University presented an Olympic-style opening ceremony which was the first time it took place in an open field on July 9, 2011 at the Marikina Sports Park. The highlights of the opening ceremony were the presentation of the UAAP board of directors, parade of athletes, torch relay, cauldron lighting and free concert. It also featured a group of Ateneo graduates singing the UAAP theme song. The Ateneo Blue Babble Battalion and Spongecola's Yael Yuzon provided entertainment during the ceremonies.

The torch relay took place prior to the start of the events in the Marikina Sports Park. The relay started from the De La Salle University campus in Taft Avenue, Malate, Manila and passed thru the campuses of the other seven member schools of the UAAP. Athletes representing their school received and transferred the torch to the next school by means of running. Ateneo was the last school to receive the torch. Thus it had the honor of bringing the torch to its final destination which was the Marikina Sports Park. Former Ateneo basketball player Olsen Racela was the torch lighter which role he did when he lighted the cauldron with the torch after being lifted by a hydraulic conveyor.

The opening ceremony proceeded as scheduled despite continuous rains. Contingency plans were made so that the ceremony will not be called off due to inclement weather. The parade of athletes proceeded with the athletes carrying colored umbrellas corresponding to their school colors. The following schools make up the UAAP: Ateneo de Manila University, Adamson University, De La Salle University, Far Eastern University, National University, University of Santo Tomas, University of the East, and University of the Philippines.

University of Santo Tomas had the largest delegation with 627 athletes. It was followed by Ateneo de Manila (600), University of the East (512), University of the Philippines (425), De La Salle University (417), Adamson University (300), Far Eastern University (300) and National University (260).

Basketball games started the next day at the Smart Araneta Coliseum.

== Basketball ==
The UAAP Season 74 basketball tournament began on July 10, 2011 at the Araneta Coliseum in Cubao, Quezon City. The tournament host was Ateneo de Manila University and tournament commissioner was Andrew "Andy" Jao.

=== Men's tournament ===
==== Elimination round ====
Pos	Team	W	L	PCT	GB	Qualification
1	Ateneo Blue Eagles (H)	13	1	.929	—	Twice-to-beat in the semifinals
2	Adamson Soaring Falcons	10	4	.714	3	Twice-to-beat in the semifinals
3	FEU Tamaraws	9	5	.643	4	Twice-to-win in the semifinals
4	UST Growling Tigers	8	6	.571	5	Twice-to-win in the semifinals
5	NU Bulldogs	6	8	.429	7	
6	De La Salle Green Archers	5	9	.357	8	
7	UE Red Warriors	3	11	.214	10	
8	UP Fighting Maroons	2	12	.143	11	

Source: ABS-CBN Sports
Rules for classification: 1) winning percentage; 2) if tied for #2 or #4, one-game playoff; 3) head-to-head record; 4) head-to-head point differential; 5) overall point differential
(H) Hosts

==== Playoffs ====
Semifinals (Top 2 twice-to-beat)
1	Ateneo	69
4	UST	66
2	Adamson	49	74
3	FEU	59	78

Finals (Best-of-three playoff)
1	Ateneo	82	82
3	FEU	64	69

==== Awards ====
- Most Valuable Player: Bobby Ray Parks Jr. (NU Bulldogs)
- Rookie of the Year: Kiefer Ravena (Ateneo Blue Eagles)

=== Women's tournament ===
==== Elimination round ====
Pos	Team	W	L	PCT	GB	Qualification
1	FEU Lady Tamaraws	12	2	.857	—	Twice-to-beat in the semifinals
2	Adamson Lady Falcons	10	4	.714 (Note: Head-to-head record: Adamson 2–2, La Salle 2–2, UST 2–2 (UST +27, Adamson –3, La Salle –24); second-seed playoff: Adamson 70–59 UST)	2	Twice-to-beat in the semifinals
3	UST Growling Tigresses	10	4	.714	2	Twice-to-win in the semifinals
4	De La Salle Lady Archers	10	4	.714	2	Twice-to-win in the semifinals
5	Ateneo Lady Eagles (H)	7	7	.500	5	
6	NU Lady Bulldogs	4	10	.286	8	
7	UP Lady Maroons	2	12	.143	10	
8	UE Lady Warriors	1	13	.071	11	

Source: ABS-CBN Sports
Rules for classification: 1) winning percentage; 2) if tied for #2 or #4, one-game playoff; 3) head-to-head record; 4) head-to-head point differential; 5) overall point differential
(H) Hosts

==== Playoffs ====
Semifinals (Top 2 twice-to-beat)
1	FEU	54	66
4	La Salle	57	44
2	Adamson	53
3	UST	45

Finals (Best-of-three playoff)
1	FEU	56	72	68
2	Adamson	60	50	57

===== Awards =====
- Most Valuable Player:
- Rookie of the Year:

=== Boys' tournament ===
==== Elimination round ====
Pos	Team	W	L	PCT	GB	Qualification
1	FEU–D Baby Tamaraws	12	2	.857	—	Twice-to-beat in the semifinals
2	Zobel Junior Archers	11	3	.786	1	Twice-to-beat in the semifinals
3	NUNS Bullpups	10	4	.714	2	Twice-to-win in the semifinals
4	Ateneo Blue Eaglets (H)	9	5	.643	3	Twice-to-win in the semifinals
5	Adamson Baby Falcons	7	7	.500	5	
6	UST Tiger Cubs	5	9	.357	7	
7	UE Junior Red Warriors	1	13	.071 (Note: Head-to-head record: UE 1–1 UP (UE +8))	11	
8	UPIS Junior Fighting Maroons	1	13	.071	11	

Source: ABS-CBN Sports
Rules for classification: 1) winning percentage; 2) if tied for #2 or #4, one-game playoff; 3) head-to-head record; 4) head-to-head point differential; 5) overall point differential
(H) Hosts

==== Playoffs ====
Semifinals (Top 2 twice-to-beat)
1	FEU–FERN	53	63
4	Ateneo	62	56
2	DLSZ	52	46
3	NSNU	66	49

Finals (Best-of-three playoff)
1	FEU–FERN	71	46	63
3	NSNU	67	57	72

==== Awards ====
- Most Valuable Player: Jerie Marlon Pingoy (FEU–D Baby Tamaraws)
- Rookie of the Year: Tomas Gabriel Ramos (Ateneo Blue Eaglets)

== Volleyball ==
=== Seniors division ===
==== Men's tournament ====
===== Elimination round =====
====== Team standings ======
Pos	Team	Pld	W	L	Pts	SW	SL	SR	SPW	SPL	SPR	Qualification
1	FEU Tamaraws	14	12	2	26	40	18	2.222	1338	1162	1.151	Twice-to-beat in the semifinals
2	UST Growling Tigers	14	11	3	25	36	17	2.118	1224	1089	1.124	Twice-to-beat in the semifinals
3	Adamson Soaring Falcons	14	9	5	23 (Note: Sets ratio: Adamson 1.750, La Salle 1.632)	35	20	1.750	1245	1127	1.105	Twice-to-win in the semifinals
4	De La Salle Green Archers	14	9	5	23	31	19	1.632	1149	1068	1.076	Twice-to-win in the semifinals
5	NU Bulldogs	14	7	7	21	30	24	1.250	1213	1172	1.035	
6	UP Fighting Maroons	14	6	8	20	24	33	0.727	1220	1324	0.921	
7	Ateneo Blue Eagles	14	2	12	16	9	38	0.237	892	1113	0.801	
8	UE Red Warriors	14	0	14	14	6	42	0.143	950	1185	0.802	

Source: ABS-CBN Sports
Rules for classification: 1) number of wins; 2) if tied for #2 or #4, one-game playoff; 3) match points; 4) sets ratio; 5) points ratio

===== Playoffs =====
Semifinals (Nos. 1 & 2 have twice-to-beat advantage)
1	FEU	1	3
4	La Salle	3	1
2	UST	3
3	Adamson	1

Finals (Best-of-three series)
1	FEU	3	3
2	UST	0	2

* if necessary

===== Awards =====
- Most Valuable Player: Jayson Ramos (UST Growling Tigers)
- Rookie of the Year: Vincent Rafael Mangulabnan (NU Bulldogs)

==== Women's tournament ====
===== Elimination round =====
====== Team standings ======
Pos	Team	Pld	W	L	Pts	SW	SL	SR	SPW	SPL	SPR	Qualification
1	De La Salle Lady Archers	14	14	0	28	42	8	5.250	1177	918	1.282	Advance to the Finals
2	Ateneo Lady Eagles	14	11	3	25	37	16	2.313	1214	1025	1.184	Twice-to-beat in stepladder round 2
3	UST Growling Tigresses	14	9	5	23	32	19	1.684	1160	1022	1.135	Stepladder round 1
4	FEU Lady Tamaraws	14	8	6	22 (Note: Head-to-head record: FEU 1–1 Adamson; fourth-seed playoff: FEU 3–0 Adamson)	32	19	1.684	1144	1075	1.064	Stepladder round 1
5	Adamson Lady Falcons	14	8	6	22	28	23	1.217	1135	1052	1.079	Qualified to fourth-seed playoff
6	UE Lady Warriors	14	4	10	18	12	35	0.343	910	1081	0.842	
7	NU Lady Bulldogs	14	2	12	16	13	37	0.351	911	1137	0.801	
8	UP Lady Maroons	14	0	14	14	3	42	0.071	767	1108	0.692	

Source: ABS-CBN Sports
Rules for classification: 1) number of wins; 2) if tied for #2 or #4, one-game playoff; 3) match points; 4) sets ratio; 5) points ratio

===== Playoffs =====
4th–seed playoff (One–game playoff)
4	Adamson	0
5	FEU	3

First round (One–game playoff)
3	UST	3
4	FEU	1

Semifinals (No. 2 seed has twice-to-beat advantage)
2	Ateneo	3
3	UST	1

Finals (#1 seed has 1-0 lead in a best-of-5 series)
1	La Salle	1	3	3
2	Ateneo	3	1	0

===== Awards =====
- Season Most Valuable Player: Abigail Maraño (De La Salle Lady Archers)
- Finals Most Valuable Player: Cha Cruz (De La Salle Lady Archers)
- Rookie of the Year: Victonara Galang (De La Salle Lady Archers)

=== Juniors division ===
==== Boys' tournament ====
===== Elimination round =====
====== Team standings ======
Team	W	L	PCT	GB
UE Junior Red Warriors	7	0	1.000	—
UST Tiger Cubs	5	2	.714	2
NUNS Bullpups	5	2	.714	2
Ateneo Blue Eaglets	3	4	.429	4
Zobel Junior Archers	1	6	.143	6
UPIS Junior Fighting Maroons	0	7	.000	7

- Qualified to the finals with the twice to beat advantage
- Qualified to the finals
- Qualified to the second-seed playoff

===== Playoffs =====
Second-seed playoff			Finals #1 has a 1–0 lead in a best-of-3 series
			1	UE	3
2	NU	0	2	UST	0
3	UST	3

===== Awards =====
- Most Valuable Player: Edward Camposano (UE Junior Red Warriors)
- Rookie of the Year: Christian Lorez Gopio (UE Junior Red Warriors)

==== Girls' tournament ====
===== Elimination round =====
====== Team standings ======
Rank	Team	W	L	PCT	GB
1st place, gold medalist(s)	La Salle Junior Lady Archers	6	0	1.000	—
2nd place, silver medalist(s)	UE Junior Amazons	5	1	.833	1
3rd place, bronze medalist(s)	UST Lady Tiger Cubs	3	3	.500	3
4	UPIS Junior Lady Maroons	1	5	.167	5
5	NU Lady Bullpups	0	6	.000	6

- Qualified to the Finals with the twice-to-beat advantage
- Qualified to the Finals

===== Awards =====
- Most Valuable Player:
- Rookie of the Year: Christine Mhae Tolentino (UE Junior Lady Warriors)

== Beach volleyball ==
The UAAP Season 74 beach volleyball tournament began on August 27, 2011 at the sand courts of UE Caloocan.

=== Men's tournament ===
==== Elimination round ====
===== Team standings =====
Team	W	L	PCT	GB
FEU Tamaraws	7	0	1.000	—
Adamson Soaring Falcons	6	1	.800	1
UST Growling Tigers	5	2	.800	2
UP Fighting Maroons	3	4	.500	4
UE Red Warriors	3	4	.500	4
De La Salle Green Archers	3	4	.400	4
NU Bulldogs	1	6	.000	6
**Ateneo Blue Eagles**	0	7	.000	7

Season host is boldfaced.

Qualified to the Finals with the thrice to beat advantage
Qualified to the semifinals with the twice to beat advantage
Qualified to the first round

===== Schedule =====
Team ╲ Game	1	2	3	4	5	6	7
AdU	FEU school colors	Ateneo school colors	UST school colors	NU school colors	La Salle school colors	UE school colors	UP school colors
ADMU	La Salle school colors	Adamson school colors	UE school colors	UST school colors	FEU school colors	UP school colors	NU school colors
DLSU	Ateneo school colors	FEU school colors	NU school colors	UP school colors	Adamson school colors	UST school colors	UE school colors
FEU	Adamson school colors	La Salle school colors	UP school colors	UE school colors	Ateneo school colors	NU school colors	UST school colors
NU	UE school colors	UP school colors	La Salle school colors	Adamson school colors	UST school colors	FEU school colors	Ateneo school colors
UE	NU school colors	UST school colors	Ateneo school colors	FEU school colors	UP school colors	Adamson school colors	La Salle school colors
UP	UST school colors	NU school colors	FEU school colors	La Salle school colors	UE school colors	Ateneo school colors	Adamson school colors
UST	UP school colors	UE school colors	Adamson school colors	Ateneo school colors	NU school colors	La Salle school colors	FEU school colors

= Win; = Loss

==== Playoffs ====
Stepladder round 1 One-game playoff
3	**UST**	**2**
4	UP	1

Semifinal; Knockout game
2	Adamson	1
3	**UST**	**2**

Finals; 1st seed has 1–0 lead in the best-of-3 series
1	**FEU**	**2***	**2**
3	UST	0	0

==== Awards ====
- Most Valuable Player: Arvin Avila (FEU Tamaraws)
- Rookie of the Year: Israel Marasigan (Ateneo Blue Eagles)

=== Women's tournament ===
==== Elimination round ====
===== Team standings =====
Team	W	L	PCT	GB
UST Growling Tigresses	6	1	.857	—
**Ateneo Lady Eagles**	6	1	.857	—
Adamson Lady Falcons	5	2	.714	1
De La Salle Lady Archers	3	4	.429	3
UE Lady Warriors	3	4	.429	3
FEU Lady Tamaraws	3	4	.429	3
UP Lady Maroons	2	5	.286	4
NU Lady Bulldogs	0	7	.000	6

Season host is boldfaced.

Qualified to the semifinals with the twice to beat advantage
Qualified to the semifinals

===== Schedule =====
Team ╲ Game	1	2	3	4	5	6	7
AdU	FEU school colors	UE school colors	UST school colors	Ateneo school colors	UP school colors	NU school colors	La Salle school colors
ADMU	NU school colors	La Salle school colors	UP school colors	Adamson school colors	UST school colors	FEU school colors	UE school colors
DLSU	UST school colors	Ateneo school colors	FEU school colors	UP school colors	NU school colors	UE school colors	Adamson school colors
FEU	Adamson school colors	UP school colors	La Salle school colors	NU school colors	UE school colors	Ateneo school colors	UST school colors
NU	Ateneo school colors	UST school colors	UE school colors	FEU school colors	La Salle school colors	Adamson school colors	UP school colors
UE	UP school colors	Adamson school colors	NU school colors	UST school colors	FEU school colors	La Salle school colors	Ateneo school colors
UP	UE school colors	FEU school colors	Ateneo school colors	La Salle school colors	Adamson school colors	UST school colors	NU school colors
UST	La Salle school colors	NU school colors	Adamson school colors	UE school colors	Ateneo school colors	UP school colors	FEU school colors

= Win; = Loss

==== Playoffs ====
Semifinals (Nos. 1 & 2 have twice-to-beat advantage)
1	**UST**	**2**
4	La Salle	0
2	**Ateneo**	**2**
3	Adamson	1

Finals (Best-of-three series)
1	**UST**	**2**	0	**2**
2	Ateneo	1	**2**	0

==== Awards ====
- Most Valuable Player: Judy Caballejo (UST Growling Tigresses)
- Rookie of the Year: Camille Cruz (De La Salle Lady Archers)

== Football ==
The UAAP Season 74 football tournament began on January 14, 2012 at the football fields of the Ateneo de Manila University.

=== Seniors division ===
==== Men's tournament ====
===== Elimination round =====
====== Team standings ======
Rank	Team	Pld	W	D	L	GF	GA	GD	Pts
1	UP Fighting Maroons	10	5	5	0	11	1	+10	20
2	UST Growling Tigers	10	4	4	2	6	4	+2	16
3	FEU Tamaraws	10	4	3	3	11	6	+5	15
4	De La Salle Green Archers	10	3	4	3	5	7	–2	13
5	Ateneo Blue Eagles	10	3	0	7	4	13	–9	9
6	UE Red Warriors	10	1	4	5	2	9	–7	7

Qualified to the Finals with the twice to beat advantage
Qualified to the Finals

====== Match-up results ======
	Round 1					Round 2				
Team ╲ Game	1	2	3	4	5	6	7	8	9	10
ADMU	UP school colors	UE school colors	UST school colors	FEU school colors	La Salle school colors	UP school colors	UE school colors	UST school colors	FEU school colors	La Salle school colors
DLSU	UE school colors	UST school colors	FEU school colors	UP school colors	Ateneo school colors	FEU school colors	UST school colors	UP school colors	UE school colors	Ateneo school colors
FEU	UST school colors	UP school colors	La Salle school colors	Ateneo school colors	UE school colors	La Salle school colors	UP school colors	UE school colors	Ateneo school colors	UST school colors
UE	La Salle school colors	Ateneo school colors	UP school colors	UST school colors	FEU school colors	UST school colors	Ateneo school colors	FEU school colors	La Salle school colors	UP school colors
UP	Ateneo school colors	FEU school colors	UE school colors	La Salle school colors	UST school colors	Ateneo school colors	FEU school colors	La Salle school colors	UST school colors	UE school colors
UST	FEU school colors	La Salle school colors	Ateneo school colors	UE school colors	UP school colors	UE school colors	La Salle school colors	Ateneo school colors	UP school colors	FEU school colors

= Win; = Draw; = Loss

===== Finals =====
February 26, 2012
2:00 PM (UTC+08:00)

UP Fighting Maroons	1–0	UST Growling Tigers
Valmayor 61'

Ateneo High School Football Field, Quezon City

UP wins series in one game

===== Awards =====
- Most Valuable Player: Nathan Octavio (UP Fighting Maroons)
- Rookie of the Year: Michael Nehemiah Simms (UP Fighting Maroons)

==== Women's tournament ====
===== Elimination round =====
====== Team standings ======
Rank	Team	Pld	W	D	L	GF	GA	GD	Pts
1	UST Growling Tigresses	8	4	3	1	12	5	+7	**15**
2	De La Salle Lady Archers	8	3	4	1	7	4	+3	**13**
3	FEU Lady Tamaraws	8	2	5	1	7	5	+2	**11**
4	UP Lady Maroons	8	3	2	3	7	7	0	**11**
5	**Ateneo Lady Eagles**	8	0	2	6	2	14	–12	**2**

Host team in **boldface**.

Qualified to the Finals with the twice to beat advantage
Qualified to the Finals

====== Match-up results ======
	Round 1				Round 2			
Team ╲ Game	1	2	3	4	5	6	7	8
ADMU	La Salle school colors	FEU school colors	UST school colors	UP school colors	FEU school colors	UP school colors	UST school colors	La Salle school colors
DLSU	Ateneo school colors	UST school colors	UP school colors	FEU school colors	UP school colors	UST school colors	FEU school colors	Ateneo school colors
FEU	Ateneo school colors	UST school colors	UP school colors	La Salle school colors	UP school colors	Ateneo school colors	UST school colors	La Salle school colors
UP	UST school colors	La Salle school colors	FEU school colors	Ateneo school colors	La Salle school colors	FEU school colors	Ateneo school colors	UST school colors
UST	UP school colors	La Salle school colors	FEU school colors	Ateneo school colors	La Salle school colors	FEU school colors	Ateneo school colors	UP school colors

= Win; = Draw; = Loss

===== Finals =====
February 26, 2012
9:00 AM (UTC+08:00)

UST Growling Tigresses	0–0 (a.e.t.)	De La Salle Lady Archers
Penalties
Barruga (penalty missed); Fuertes (penalty missed)	3–4

Ateneo High School Football Field, Quezon City
March 4
09:00 AM (UTC+08:00)

UST Growling Tigresses	1–0	De La Salle Lady Archers
Barruga 68'

Ateneo High School Football Field, Quezon City

UST wins series in two games

===== Awards =====
- Most Valuable Player: Mariz Magdolot (UST Growling Tigresses)
- Rookie of the Year: Cristina de los Reyes (UP Lady Maroons)

=== Juniors division ===
==== Boys' tournament ====
===== Elimination round =====
====== Team standings ======
Rank	Team	Pld	W	D	L	GF	GA	GD	Pts
1st place, gold medalist(s)	FEU–D Baby Tamaraws	6	6	0	0	23	0	+23	**18**
2nd place, silver medalist(s)	**Ateneo Blue Eaglets**	6	3	0	3	13	5	+8	**9**
3rd place, bronze medalist(s)	Zobel Junior Archers	6	3	0	3	11	14	–3	**9**
4	UST Tiger Cubs	6	0	0	6	1	29	–28	**0**

Host team in **boldface**.

====== Match-up results ======
	Round 1			Round 2		
Team ╲ Game	1	2	3	4	5	6
ADMU	La Salle school colors	UST school colors	FEU school colors	La Salle school colors	FEU school colors	UST school colors
DLSU	Ateneo school colors	FEU school colors	UST school colors	Ateneo school colors	UST school colors	FEU school colors
FEU	UST school colors	La Salle school colors	Ateneo school colors	UST school colors	Ateneo school colors	La Salle school colors
UST	FEU school colors	Ateneo school colors	La Salle school colors	FEU school colors	La Salle school colors	Ateneo school colors

= Win; = Loss

There was no playoff. FEU was automatically declared champion after sweeping the elimination rounds.

== Baseball ==
The UAAP Season 74 baseball tournament began on January 12, 2012 at the baseball diamond of the Rizal Memorial Sports Complex. This year marked the introduction of high school baseball in the UAAP as a demonstration sport. The initial participating schools were Ateneo de Manila University, De La Salle-Santiago Zobel School and University of Santo Tomas High School.

=== Men's tournament ===
==== Elimination round ====
===== Team standings =====
Team	W	L	PCT	GB
NU Bulldogs	8	2	.800	—
**Ateneo Blue Eagles**	7	3	.700	1
De La Salle Green Archers	7	3	.700	1
UST Growling Tigers	4	6	.400	4
Adamson Soaring Falcons	3	7	.300	5
UP Fighting Maroons	1	9	.100	7

Host team in **boldface**.

Qualified to the semifinals with the twice to beat advantage
Qualified to the semifinals

===== Schedule =====
	Round 1					Round 2				
Team ╲ Game	1	2	3	4	5	6	7	8	9	10
AdU	Ateneo school colors	La Salle school colors	UST school colors	NU school colors	UP school colors	La Salle school colors	Ateneo school colors	UST school colors	UP school colors	NU school colors
ADMU	Adamson school colors	NU school colors	UP school colors	UST school colors	La Salle school colors	UP school colors	Adamson school colors	NU school colors	UST school colors	La Salle school colors
DLSU	UST school colors	Adamson school colors	NU school colors	UP school colors	Ateneo school colors	Adamson school colors	UST school colors	UP school colors	NU school colors	Ateneo school colors
NU	UP school colors	Ateneo school colors	La Salle school colors	Adamson school colors	UST school colors	UST school colors	UP school colors	Ateneo school colors	La Salle school colors	Adamson school colors
UP	NU school colors	UST school colors	Ateneo school colors	La Salle school colors	Adamson school colors	Ateneo school colors	NU school colors	La Salle school colors	Adamson school colors	UST school colors
UST	La Salle school colors	UP school colors	Adamson school colors	Ateneo school colors	NU school colors	NU school colors	La Salle school colors	Adamson school colors	Ateneo school colors	UP school colors

= Win; = Loss

==== Playoffs ====
Semifinals (Nos. 1 & 2 have twice-to-beat advantage)
1	**NU**	2	**7**
4	UST	**4**	2
2	**Ateneo**	**13** (F/8)
3	La Salle	4

Finals (Best-of-three series)
1	**NU**	4	**5**	**5**
2	Ateneo	**11**	2	4

=== Juniors' tournament ===
==== Elimination round ====
===== Team standings =====
Team	W	L	PCT	GB
**Ateneo Blue Eaglets**	3	1	.750	-
Zobel Junior Archers	3	1	.750	-
UST Tiger Cubs	0	4	.000	3

Host team in **boldface**.

Qualified to the Finals

===== Schedule =====
	Round 1		Round 2	
Team ╲ Game	1	2	3	4
ADMU	La Salle school colors	UST school colors	UST school colors	La Salle school colors
DLSU	Ateneo school colors	UST school colors	Ateneo school colors	UST school colors
UST	Ateneo school colors	La Salle school colors	Ateneo school colors	La Salle school colors

= Win; = Loss

== Softball ==
The UAAP Season 74 softball tournament began on January 11, 2012 at the baseball diamond of the Rizal Memorial Sports Complex. With Adamson sweeping the elimination round, they were declared automatic champions and the playoffs were scrapped.

=== Women's tournament ===
==== Elimination round ====
===== Team standings =====
Rank	Team	W	L	PCT	GB
1st place, gold medalist(s)	Adamson Lady Falcons	10	0	1.000	—
2nd place, silver medalist(s)	UP Lady Maroons	7	3	.700	3
3rd place, bronze medalist(s)	UE Lady Warriors	6	4	.600	4
4	UST Growling Tigresses	5	5	.500	5
5	**Ateneo Lady Eagles**	2	8	.200	7
6	De La Salle Lady Archers	0	10	.000	10

Host team in **boldface**.

===== Match-up results =====
	Round 1					Round 2				
Team ╲ Game	1	2	3	4	5	6	7	8	9	10
AdU	La Salle school colors	Ateneo school colors	UST school colors	UP school colors	UE school colors	La Salle school colors	Ateneo school colors	UE school colors	UST school colors	UP school colors
ADMU	UE school colors	Adamson school colors	UP school colors	La Salle school colors	UST school colors	UP school colors	Adamson school colors	UST school colors	La Salle school colors	UE school colors
DLSU	Adamson school colors	UST school colors	UE school colors	Ateneo school colors	UP school colors	Adamson school colors	UE school colors	UP school colors	Ateneo school colors	UST school colors
UE	Ateneo school colors	UP school colors	La Salle school colors	UST school colors	Adamson school colors	UST school colors	La Salle school colors	Adamson school colors	UP school colors	Ateneo school colors
UP	UST school colors	UE school colors	Ateneo school colors	Adamson school colors	La Salle school colors	Ateneo school colors	UST school colors	La Salle school colors	UE school colors	Adamson school colors
UST	UP school colors	La Salle school colors	Adamson school colors	UE school colors	Ateneo school colors	UE school colors	UP school colors	Ateneo school colors	Adamson school colors	La Salle school colors

= Win; = Loss

==== Awards ====
- Most Valuable Player: Rizza Bernardino (Adamson Lady Falcons)
- Rookie of the Year: Quenny Sabobo (Adamson Lady Falcons)

== Tennis ==
The UAAP Season 74 tennis tournaments began on January 7, 2012 at the Rizal Memorial Tennis Center.

=== Men's tournament ===
==== Elimination round ====
===== Team standings =====
Team	W	L	PCT	GB
De La Salle Green Archers	10	0	1.000	—
NU Bulldogs	8	2	.800	1
UST Growling Tigers	5	5	.500	5
UP Fighting Maroons	4	6	.400	6
UE Red Warriors	3	7	.300	7
**Ateneo Blue Eagles**	0	10	.000	10

Host team in **boldface**.

Qualified to the Finals with the twice to beat advantage
Qualified to the Finals

===== Schedule =====
	Round 1					Round 2				
Team ╲ Game	1	2	3	4	5	6	7	8	9	10
ADMU	UP school colors	La Salle school colors	UE school colors	UST school colors	NU school colors	La Salle school colors	UP school colors	NU school colors	UE school colors	UST school colors
DLSU	UE school colors	Ateneo school colors	NU school colors	UP school colors	UST school colors	Ateneo school colors	UE school colors	UP school colors	UST school colors	NU school colors
NU	UST school colors	UP school colors	La Salle school colors	UE school colors	Ateneo school colors	UE school colors	UST school colors	Ateneo school colors	UP school colors	La Salle school colors
UE	La Salle school colors	UST school colors	Ateneo school colors	NU school colors	UP school colors	NU school colors	La Salle school colors	UST school colors	Ateneo school colors	UP school colors
UP	Ateneo school colors	NU school colors	UST school colors	La Salle school colors	UE school colors	UST school colors	Ateneo school colors	La Salle school colors	NU school colors	UE school colors
UST	NU school colors	UE school colors	UP school colors	Ateneo school colors	La Salle school colors	UP school colors	NU school colors	UE school colors	La Salle school colors	Ateneo school colors

= Win; = Loss

==== Finals ====
With De La Salle Green Tennisters sweeping the elimination round, the Final round went through a best-of-three series with the team enjoying the twice-to-beat advantage over the second placer NU Bulldogs. La Salle won the championship title after beating NU (3–2) in one game last February 21, 2012 at the Rizal Memorial Tennis Center.

Matches on Rizal Memorial Tennis Center
Event		Winner	Loser	Score	Notes
1	Singles, 1st round	**Michael Basco**	Tim Polero	6–0, 6–0	La Salle leads match, 1–0.
2	Doubles, 1st round	**Michael Madrio**; **Fritz Verdad**	Pemrik Alina; Kyle Cordero	7–6 ^{(3–0)}, 6–1	Match tied, 1–1.
3	Singles, 2nd round	**Alberto Villamor**	Al Khady Jainul	6–4, 6–2	La Salle leads match, 2–1.
4	Doubles, 2nd round	**Dheo Talatayod**; **Wilson Oblea**	Ed Amor; Fidel Regis	6–4, 6–3	Match tied, 2–2.
5	Singles, 3rd round	**Ernesto Pantua**	Leander Lazaro	2–6, 6–4, 6–2	La Salle wins tennis title.

==== Awards ====
- Most Valuable Player: Michael Basco (De La Salle Green Archers)
- Rookie of the Year: Leander Lazaro (NU Bulldogs)

=== Women's tournament ===
==== Elimination round ====
===== Team standings =====
Team	W	L	PCT	GB
De La Salle Lady Archers	6	0	1.000	—
UST Growling Tigresses	3	3	.500	3
UP Lady Maroons	3	3	.500	3
**Ateneo Lady Eagles**	0	6	.000	6

Host team in **boldface**.

Qualified to the Finals with the twice to beat advantage
Qualified to the Finals
Qualified to the second-seed playoff

===== Schedule =====
	Round 1			Round 2		
Team ╲ Game	1	2	3	4	5	6
ADMU	UP school colors	UST school colors	La Salle school colors	La Salle school colors	UP school colors	UST school colors
DLSU	UST school colors	UP school colors	Ateneo school colors	Ateneo school colors	UST school colors	UP school colors
UP	Ateneo school colors	La Salle school colors	UST school colors	UST school colors	Ateneo school colors	La Salle school colors
UST	La Salle school colors	Ateneo school colors	UP school colors	UP school colors	La Salle school colors	Ateneo school colors

= Win; = Loss

==== Playoffs ====
Second-seed playoff			Finals #1 has a 1–0 lead in a best-of-3 series
			1	La Salle	2	2
2	**UST**	**3**	2	**UST**	**3**	**3**
3	UP	1

==== Second-seed playoff ====
Being tied at second place, UST Lady Tennisters defeated UP Lady Tennisters (3–1) on a playoff, the last berth to the Final round, on February 21, 2012 at the Rizal Memorial Tennis Center.

Matches on Rizal Memorial Tennis Center
Event		Winner	Loser	Score	Notes
1	Singles, 1st round	**Zaza Paulino**	Bea Fabregas	4–6, 7–5, 6–0	UST leads match, 1–0.
2	Doubles, 1st round	**Diane Bautista**; **Chrizanth Helar**	Meli delos Reyes; Creslita Gulosino	6–1, 7–6 ^{(7–0)}	UST leads match, 2–0.
3	Singles, 2nd round	**Sarah Jane Restauro**	Macy Gonzales	6–3, 6–3	UST still leads match, 2–1.
4	Doubles, 2nd round	**Hazel Grecia**; **April Santos**	JV Custodio; Medeline Ramos	7–5, 7–6 ^{(4–0)}	UST wins playoff and advances to Finals.

==== Finals ====
With De La Salle Lady Tennisters sweeping the elimination round, the Final round went through a best-of-three series with the team enjoying the twice-to-beat advantage over the playoff winner UST Lady Tennisters. UST forced a rubber match and obtained the championship title after beating La Salle (3–2) in the second game. Finals first and second games were held on February 24 and 26 respectively at the Rizal Memorial Tennis Center.

Game 1
Matches on Rizal Memorial Tennis Center
Event		Winner	Loser	Score	Notes
1	Singles, 1st round	**Regina Santiago**	Hazel Grecia	6–0, 6–2	La Salle leads match, 1–0.
2	Doubles, 1st round	**Diane Bautista**; **Chrizanth Helar**	Nadine Castillo; Aira Putiz	6–1, 6–0	Match tied, 1–1.
3	Singles, 2nd round	**Martina Guba**	Linda Santos	6–1, 6–1	La Salle leads match, 2–1.
4	Doubles, 2nd round	**Macy Gonzales**; **April Santos**	Trudy Amoranto; Kirstie Barraquias	7–6 ^{(7–0)}, 3–6, 6–2	Match tied, 2–2.
5	Singles, 3rd round	**Zaza Paulino**	Enah Baba	6–2, 6–1	UST forces one game.
Game 2
Matches on Rizal Memorial Tennis Center
Event		Winner	Loser	Score	Notes
1	Singles, 1st round	**Regina Santiago**	Linda Santos	6–7 ^{(0–4)}, 6–0, 6–3	La Salle leads match, 1–0
2	Doubles, 1st round	**Diane Bautista**; **Chrizanth Helar**	Trudy Amoranto; Kirstie Barraquias	3–6, 6–2, 6–3	Match tied, 1–1.
3	Singles, 2nd round	**Martina Guba**	Hazel Grecia	6–2, 6–0	La Salle leads match, 2–1.
4	Doubles, 2nd round	**Macy Gonzales**; **April Santos**	Nadine Castillo; Aira Putiz	6–0, 6–0	Match tied, 2–2.
5	Singles, 3rd round	**Zaza Paulino**	Enah Baba	6–3, 6–3	UST wins tennis title.

==== Awards ====
- Most Valuable Player: Macy Gonzales (UST Growling Tigresses)
- Rookie of the Year: April Santos (UST Growling Tigresses)

== Badminton ==
The UAAP Season 74 badminton tournament began on August 6, 2011 at Badminton Hall, Rizal Memorial Sports Complex.

=== Men's tournament ===
==== Elimination round ====
===== Team standings =====
Team	W	L	PCT	GB
De La Salle Green Archers	6	1	.857	—
NU Bulldogs	6	1	.857	—
FEU Tamaraws	5	2	.714	1
**Ateneo Blue Eagles**	5	2	.714	1
UST Growling Tigers	2	5	.286	4
UP Fighting Maroons	2	5	.286	4
UE Red Warriors	1	6	.143	5
Adamson Soaring Falcons	1	6	.143	5

Season host is boldfaced.

Qualified to the semifinals with the twice to beat advantage
Qualified to the semifinals

===== Schedule =====
Team ╲ Game	1	2	3	4	5	6	7
AdU	UE school colors	La Salle school colors	UP school colors	NU school colors	Ateneo school colors	UST school colors	FEU school colors
ADMU	La Salle school colors	UE school colors	NU school colors	FEU school colors	Adamson school colors	UP school colors	UST school colors
DLSU	Ateneo school colors	Adamson school colors	UST school colors	UP school colors	UE school colors	FEU school colors	NU school colors
FEU	UP school colors	NU school colors	UE school colors	Ateneo school colors	UST school colors	La Salle school colors	Adamson school colors
NU	UST school colors	FEU school colors	Ateneo school colors	Adamson school colors	UP school colors	UE school colors	La Salle school colors
UE	Adamson school colors	Ateneo school colors	FEU school colors	UST school colors	La Salle school colors	NU school colors	UP school colors
UP	FEU school colors	UST school colors	Adamson school colors	La Salle school colors	NU school colors	Ateneo school colors	UE school colors
UST	NU school colors	UP school colors	La Salle school colors	UE school colors	FEU school colors	Adamson school colors	Ateneo school colors

= Win; = Loss

==== Playoffs ====
Semifinals (Nos. 1 & 2 have twice-to-beat advantage)
1	La Salle	1	0
4	**Ateneo**	**3**	**3**
2	**NU**	**3**
3	FEU	1

Finals; One-game playoff
4	**Ateneo**	**3**	—
2	NU	1	—

==== Awards ====
- Season Most Valuable Player: Toby Gadi (Ateneo Blue Eagles)
- Rookie of the Year:

=== Women's tournament ===
==== Elimination round ====
===== Team standings =====
Team	W	L	PCT	GB
De La Salle Lady Archers	6	1	.857	—
FEU Lady Tamaraws	6	1	.857	—
**Ateneo Lady Eagles**	6	1	.857	—
UE Lady Warriors	4	3	.571	2
UP Lady Maroons	3	4	.429	3
UST Growling Tigresses	2	5	.286	4
Adamson Lady Falcons	1	6	.143	5
NU Lady Bulldogs	0	7	.000	6

Season host is boldfaced.

Qualified to the semifinals with the twice to beat advantage
Qualified to the semifinals

===== Schedule =====
Team ╲ Game	1	2	3	4	5	6	7
AdU	NU school colors	La Salle school colors	Ateneo school colors	FEU school colors	UST school colors	UE school colors	UP school colors
ADMU	UP school colors	UE school colors	Adamson school colors	La Salle school colors	FEU school colors	UST school colors	NU school colors
DLSU	UST school colors	Adamson school colors	UE school colors	Ateneo school colors	NU school colors	UP school colors	FEU school colors
FEU	UE school colors	UP school colors	UST school colors	Adamson school colors	Ateneo school colors	NU school colors	La Salle school colors
NU	Adamson school colors	UST school colors	UP school colors	UE school colors	La Salle school colors	FEU school colors	Ateneo school colors
UE	FEU school colors	Ateneo school colors	La Salle school colors	NU school colors	UP school colors	Adamson school colors	UST school colors
UP	Ateneo school colors	FEU school colors	NU school colors	UST school colors	UE school colors	La Salle school colors	Adamson school colors
UST	La Salle school colors	NU school colors	FEU school colors	UP school colors	Adamson school colors	Ateneo school colors	UE school colors

= Win; = Loss

==== Playoffs ====
Semifinals (Nos. 1 & 2 have twice-to-beat advantage)
1	La Salle	2	2
4	**UE**	**3**	**3**
2	FEU	2	0
3	**Ateneo**	**3**	**3**

Finals; One-game playoff
4	**UE**	**3**	—
3	Ateneo	2	—

==== Awards ====
- Season Most Valuable Player: Jamila Fatima Cruz (UE Lady Warriors)
- Rookie of the Year: Gelita Castillo (Ateneo Lady Eagles)

== Track and field ==
The UAAP Season 74 track and field tournament is a four-day tournament held from February 9–12, 2012 at the Philippine Institute of Sports Arena in Pasig.

=== Seniors division ===
==== Men's tournament ====
===== Team standings =====
		Day 1					Day 2							Day 3					Day 4						Total
Rank	Team	A	B	C	D	E	F	G	H	I	J	K	L	M	N	O	P	Q	R	S	T	U	V	W	Total
1st place, gold medalist(s)	FEU Tamaraws	10		15	15	9	6	12		12		15	10	11		21	11	9	4		7	7	5	9	188
2nd place, silver medalist(s)	UST Growling Tigers			12	4	3	15		15	12		12	7	9	4	2	12	3	7	14		9	16	4	160
3rd place, bronze medalist(s)	De La Salle Green Archers	8	17			18		12		10			2	9	6	1		7	7		25	15		7	144
4	UE Red Warriors		8	10	2		12	6	10	3	5	10	3	3	6	6	14	6	1	13		3	16	5	142
5	**Ateneo Blue Eagles**	13	11		6		4	7	4		16				16	4		5	15	4				6	111
6	UP Fighting Maroons	6			10	6			7		16		15	5	5	3		4	3	6	5	3		3	97
7	Adamson Soaring Falcons																	2						2	4

Host team in boldface.

==== Women's tournament ====
===== Team standings =====
		Day 1						Day 2					Day 3						Day 4						Total
Rank	Team	A	B	C	D	E	F	G	H	I	J	K	L	M	N	O	P	Q	R	S	T	U	V	W	Total
1st place, gold medalist(s)	FEU Lady Tamaraws	15		15	12	11	20	17	9	17	22	14	10		8	6	24	7	20	19	10	13	6	18	293
2nd place, silver medalist(s)	UST Growling Tigresses	7	12	10	13	15	8	10	15	2	15	12		11	12		13	9	8	18	10	12	9	12	233
3rd place, bronze medalist(s)	UE Lady Warriors	5	21	10	2	5	9	10	13			11	7	22	17			6	9		4	12	7	1	171
4	UP Lady Maroons	2	4	2	6					17			3	4		16		4			5		5		68
5	De La Salle Lady Archers	3			4	6							12			14					2		4	6	51
6	**Ateneo Lady Eagles**	5								1			5					5			6		3		25
7	Adamson Lady Falcons																	3					2		5

Host team in boldface.

===== Awards =====
- Season Most Valuable Player:
- Rookie of the Year: Jenyrose Rosales (UE Lady Warriors)

=== Juniors division ===
==== Boys' tournament ====
===== Team standings =====
		Day 1					Day 2					Day 3						Day 4							Total
Rank	Team	A	B	C	D	E	F	G	H	I	J	K	L	M	N	O	P	Q	R	S	T	U	V	W	Total
1st place, gold medalist(s)	UPIS Junior Fighting Maroons	5	20	11	11	6	11	10		22	8	4	16	13	14	17	9	9	5	9	8	9	14	7	238
2nd place, silver medalist(s)	**Ateneo Blue Eaglets**	17	3		7	2		6	13	5	4	12	11	9	5		7	16	22	5	4	5	18	14	185
3rd place, bronze medalist(s)	UST Tiger Cubs	10	5	10	7	9	4	8	18	1	9	12	10			7	6	6	10	4	9	6	5	11	167
4	UE Junior Red Warriors	2		7	4	20	22	4		5	16				9	13	5			8	16	7		5	143
5	Adamson Baby Falcons		7	9				9		4				9	6		4					3			51
6	Zobel Junior Archers	3	2		8				6			9		6	3					10		4			51

Host team in boldface.

== Exhibition events ==
=== Cheerdance ===
The UAAP Cheerdance Competition was held on September 17, 2011 at the Smart Araneta Coliseum in Quezon City. The event was covered live by Studio 23 and was hosted by Boom Gonzales and the various UAAP courtside reporters.

Rank	Order	Pep squad	Score
1st place, gold medalist(s)	5th	UP Pep Squad	82.0%
2nd place, silver medalist(s)	4th	DLSU Animo Squad	73.8%
3rd place, bronze medalist(s)	6th	FEU Cheering Squad	72.6%
4th	7th	UST Salinggawi Dance Troupe	no results released
5th	1st	Adamson Pep Squad	no results released
6th	3rd	NU Pep Squad	no results released
7th	2nd	**Ateneo Blue Babble Battalion**	no results released
8th	8th	UE Pep Squad	no results released

Host team in boldface. "Order" refers to order of performance.

- Stunner awardee: Nesza Salvador (UP)

=== Street dance ===
The 2nd UAAP Street Dance Competition was held on March 10, 2012 at the Philippine International Convention Center Forum in Pasay. The event coincided with the awarding ceremony for this season's UAAP.

Rank	Team	Score
1st place, gold medalist(s)	La Salle Dance Company–Street	88.98
2nd place, silver medalist(s)	UP Street Dance Club	86.40
3rd place, bronze medalist(s)	**Company of Ateneo Dancers**	84.64
4	FEU Dance Company	82.42
5	Company of Adamson Street Dance	75.88
6	NU UnderdawgZ	72.16
7	UST Salinggawi Dance Troupe	71.50
8	UE Street Warriors	71.00

Host team in boldface.

== General championship summary ==
The general champion is determined by a point system. The system gives 15 points to the champion team of a UAAP event, 12 to the runner-up, and 10 to the third placer. The following points: 8, 6, 4, 2 and 1 are given to the rest of the participating teams according to their order of finish.

=== Medals table ===
==== Seniors' division ====
Rank	Team	Gold	Silver	Bronze	Total
1	University of Santo Tomas	8	7	3	18
2	Far Eastern University	7	3	5	15
3	De La Salle University	4	7	7	18
4	University of the Philippines Diliman	3	3	4	10
5	Ateneo de Manila University*	2	5	3	10
6	University of the East	2	0	2	4
7	National University	1	2	0	3
8	Adamson University	1	1	4	6
Totals (8 entries)		**28**	**28**	**28**	**84**

* Host nation (Season host); General champions
Notes: Results are final.

==== Juniors' division ====
Rank	Team	Gold	Silver	Bronze	Total
1	University of the East	4	2	1	7
2	Ateneo de Manila University*	2	3	1	6
3	Far Eastern University–Diliman	2	1	1	4
4	De La Salle Zobel	2	0	3	5
5	University of Santo Tomas	1	5	4	10
6	National University	1	1	2	4
7	UP Integrated School	1	0	1	2
8	Adamson University	0	1	0	1
Totals (8 entries)		**13**	**13**	**13**	**39**

* Host nation (Season host); General champions
Notes: Results are final.

=== General championship tally ===
==== Seniors' division ====
		Basketball		Volleyball (indoor)		Volleyball (beach)		Swimming		Chess		Tennis		Table tennis		Badminton		Taekwondo		Judo		Baseball	Softball	Football		Athletics		Fencing		Total		
Rank	Team	M	W	M	W	M	W	M	W	M	W	M	W	M	W	M	W	M	W	M	W	M	W	M	W	M	W	M	W	M	W	Overall
1	UST	8	10	12	10	12	15	12	8	12	2	10	15	15	8	6	4	15	8	15	15	8	8	12	15	12	12	15	4	164	134	298
2	La Salle	4	8	8	15	6	8	15	10	8	15	15	12	10	12	10	10	12	12	12	10	10	4	8	12	10	6	4	12	132	146	278
3	FEU	12	15	15	8	15	6	—	—	15	8	—	—	12	10	8	8	10	15	—	—	—	—	10	10	15	15	12	10	124	105	229
4	UP	1	2	4	1	8	2	8	15	10	12	8	10	6	15	4	6	8	10	8	12	4	12	15	8	4	8	10	8	98	121	219
5	Ateneo **(H)**	15	6	2	12	1	12	10	12	2	10	4	8	2	6	15	12	6	4	10	6	12	6	6	6	6	4	6	6	97	110	207
6	UE	2	1	1	4	4	4	6	6	1	1	6	—	8	—	2	15	4	6	6	8	—	10	4	—	8	10	8	15	60	80	140
7	Adamson	10	12	10	6	10	10	—	—	4	4	—	—	1	2	1	2	—	—	4	4	6	15	—	—	2	2	—	—	48	57	105
8	NU	6	4	6	2	2	1	—	—	6	6	12	—	4	4	12	1	—	—	—	—	15	—	—	—	—	—	—	—	63	18	81

(H) Season host; = Champion; = Runner-up; = Third place; — = No team.
Notes: Results are final.

==== Juniors' division ====
		Basketball	Volleyball (indoor)		Swimming		Chess	Table tennis	Taekwondo	Judo	Baseball	Football	Athletics	Fencing	Total				
Rank	Team	B	B	G	B	G	C	B	B	B	B	B	B	B	B	G	C	K	Overall
1	UST	4	12	10	12	12	4	10	15	12	10	8	10	12	105	22	4	0	131
2	UE	—	15	12	8	15	6	15	12	10	—	—	8	15	83	27	6	0	116
3	Ateneo **(H)**	8	8	—	15	—	8	4	6	15	12	12	12	10	102	0	8	0	110
4	DLSZ	10	6	15	10	8	2	—	8	8	15	10	4	—	71	23	2	0	96
5	UPIS	1	4	8	6	10	—	6	—	6	—	—	15	8	46	18	0	0	64
6	NU	15	10	6	—	—	10	12	—	—	—	—	—	—	37	6	10	0	53
7	FEU–D	12	—	—	—	—	15	—	10	—	—	15	—	—	37	0	15	0	52
8	Adamson	6	—	—	—	—	12	8	—	—	—	—	6	—	20	0	12	0	32

(H) Season host; = Champion; = Runner-up; = Third place; — = No team.
Notes: Results are final.

== Individual awards ==
- Athlete of the Year:
  - Seniors:
    - Johansen Benedict Aguilar (De La Salle Green Archers, swimming)
    - Rizza Bernardino (Adamson Lady Falcons, softball)
  - Juniors: Joaquin Mendoza (UST Tiger Cubs, taekwondo)

== See also ==
- NCAA Season 87
