= UAAP Cheerdance Competition =

Annual one-day event

- Sport: Cheerleading & Dance
- Founded: 1994
- No. of teams: 8
- Country: Philippines
- Most recent champion: National University (10th title)

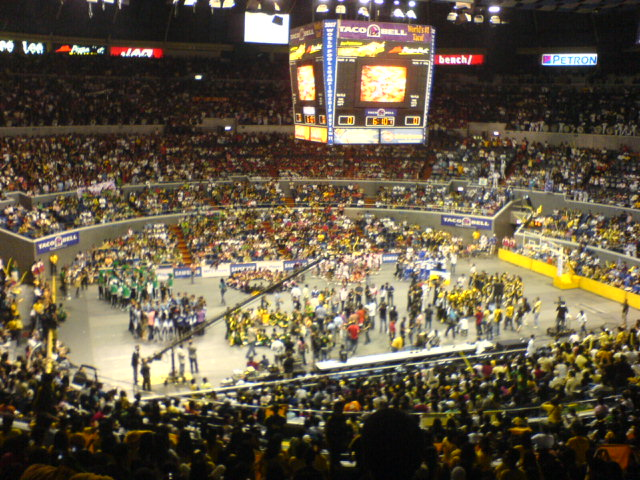
The 2007 UAAP Cheerdance Competition (CDC) held at the Araneta Coliseum in Quezon City, Philippines

The UAAP Cheerdance Competition is an annual one-day event organized by the University Athletic Association of the Philippines for cheerdancing. The sequence of performances is determined by a drawing of lots prior to the competition.

Before the announcement of the winners and after all squads have performed, a recap is shown during the telecast. Only the top three teams are announced at the end of the competition. The tally sheet detailing the total number of points earned by all squads is posted on social media shortly after the announcement of the top three.

The 2015 UAAP Cheerdance Competition holds the record as the most attended collegiate sporting event in both the UAAP and across the Philippines, with a record-breaking audience of 25,388 paying attendees.

== Participants ==
School	Cheerdance Team
Adamson University (AdU)	Adamson Pep Squad (with AdU Drummers Yellers On-line)
Ateneo de Manila University	Ateneo Blue Eagles (known as the Ateneo Blue Babble Battalion until 2022)
De La Salle University (DLSU)	DLSU Animo Squad (DLSU Pep Squad: 1986–2007) (DLSU Animo Squad: 2008–present)
Far Eastern University (FEU)	FEU Cheering Squad (with the FEU Boosters and the FEU Drummers)
National University (NU)	National U Pep Squad (with the NU Cheer Squadron and the NU Percussion Department)
University of the East (UE)	UE Pep Squad (with the UE Red Drummers)
University of the Philippines (UP)	UP Pep Squad (UP Filipiniana Dance Troupe: 1994–1996) (with the UP Varsity Pep Drummers: 2024–present)
University of Santo Tomas (UST)	UST Salinggawi Dance Troupe (with the UST Yellow Jackets)

== Judging ==
Prior to 2008, the panel of judges consisted of representatives from 8 UAAP-member schools and a representative from a credible gymnastics organization. In 2009, the UAAP replaced the panel of judges with specialists from various cheerleading, dance, and gymnastics organizations.

In 2013, a new method for composing the panel of judges was implemented by a Presiding Judge. A single judge was assigned to evaluate each element in the cheerleading criteria. For the dance criteria, either two or five judges were tasked with assessing this particular category.

The criteria for judging vary from year to year. In 2008, the criteria were changed to a more cheerleading-focused point system, providing a maximum score for each element of cheerleading and/or dancing. For the 2013 edition, the criteria were divided into two categories: cheerleading and dance. The cheerleading criteria were further subdivided into four elements (tumbling, stunts, tosses, and pyramids), with a maximum of 100 points for each element. The dance criteria, which also had a maximum of 100 points per judge, were subdivided into four sub-criteria: overall effectiveness, choreography, technique, and execution.

== Sponsors ==
Major Sponsor/s	Competition Name	Year(s)
Nestlé Ice Cream	Nestlé Crunch Ice Cream Cheering Competition	1998–1999
Nestlé Ice Cream	Nestlé Non-Stop Cheerdance Competition	2000–2005
Samsung	Samsung UAAP Cheerdance Competition	2007–2013
Purefoods, Oishi, Hana Shampoo, Systema	UAAP Cheerdance Competition	2014
Champion Detergent, Purefoods, Oishi, Jollibee, McDonald's	UAAP Cheerdance Competition	2015
Yamaha	UAAP Cheerdance Competition	2015–2021
Palmolive, PH Care	UAAP Cheerdance Competition	2022
Dunkin'	UAAP Cheerdance Competition	2023
Max	UAAP Cheerdance Competition Presented by Max	2024

== Main Cheerdance / Cheerleading Competition ==
Year	Season host	Venue	Champion	2nd place	3rd place	4th place	5th place	6th place	7th place	8th place	Ref.
1994	NU	Araneta Coliseum	UST	La Salle	FEU	UP	UE	Ateneo	Adamson	NU	
1995	Ateneo	Araneta Coliseum	UST	FEU	UP	La Salle	Adamson	UE	Ateneo	NU	
1996	La Salle	Araneta Coliseum	UST; 91.70	UP; 88.86	La Salle; 86.43	FEU; 86.39	Ateneo; 83.05	Adamson; 81.64	UE; 81.19	NU; 79.87	
1997^{a}	Adamson	The competition was suspended for a year.									
1998^{b}	UE	Araneta Coliseum	FEU	La Salle	UP	Ateneo	UE	Adamson	NU		
1999	UP	Cuneta Astrodome	UP	UST	FEU	La Salle	Adamson	Ateneo	UE	NU	
2000	UST	Araneta Coliseum	UP; 92.75	UST; 89.12	FEU; 88.99	Adamson; 84.04	UE; 83.88	La Salle; 82.25	Ateneo; 81.38	NU; 80.97	
2001	FEU	Araneta Coliseum	UP; 81.22	Adamson; 77.11	UST; 76.32	FEU; 76.17	UE; 74.96	Ateneo; 73.80	La Salle; 72.55	NU; 70.13	
2002	NU	Araneta Coliseum	UST; 87.38	UE; 84.88	UP; 84.00	FEU; 80.70	Ateneo; 78.60	Adamson; 76.80	La Salle; 71.50	NU; 64.50	
2003	Ateneo	Araneta Coliseum	UST; 89.50	UP; 88.16	FEU; 88.00	Ateneo; 83.16	UE; 78.50	Adamson; 72.60	La Salle; 69.60	NU; 61.80	
2004	La Salle	Araneta Coliseum	UST; 93.61	UP; 90.56	FEU; 87.09	Ateneo; 85.79	La Salle; 84.97	Adamson; 84.76	UE; 79.52	NU; 68.44	
2005	Adamson	Araneta Coliseum	UST; 90.98	UP; 90.76	FEU; 88.72	La Salle; 76.37	UE; 76.15	Adamson; 76.09	Ateneo; 69.33	NU; 64.48	
2006^{c}	UE	Araneta Coliseum	UST; 94.96	FEU; 93.20	UP; 91.70	Adamson	Ateneo	UE	NU		
2007	UST	Araneta Coliseum	UP; 92.66	UST; 92.16	FEU; 91.66	Ateneo; 91.63	Adamson; 91.62	UE; 91.55	La Salle; 89.54	NU; 84.23	
2008	UP	Araneta Coliseum	UP; 93.90	UST; 85.03	FEU; 83.96	Ateneo; 83.81	Adamson; 81.04	UE; 72.89	La Salle; 70.07	NU; 68.36	
2009	FEU	Araneta Coliseum	FEU; 86.10	Ateneo; 83.40	UP; 83.10	UST; 81.00	NU	UE	La Salle	Adamson	
2010	La Salle	Araneta Coliseum	UP; 88.18	FEU; 87.28	UST; 81.50	Ateneo; 78.64	La Salle; 75.06	UE; 72.20	NU; 71.58	Adamson; 70.92	
2011	Ateneo	Smart Araneta Coliseum	UP; 81.00	La Salle; 73.80	FEU; 72.60	UST	Adamson	NU	Ateneo	UE	
2012	NU	Mall of Asia Arena	UP; 92.26	FEU; 91.36	NU; 85.16	UST; 85.79	Ateneo; 80.84	UE; 79.30	La Salle; 81.76	Adamson; 77.50	
2013	Adamson	Mall of Asia Arena	NU; 87.06	UP; 77.52	La Salle; 74.56	FEU; 73.69	Adamson; 69.94	UE; 69.88	UST; 68.25	Ateneo; 64.25	
2014^{b}	UE	Smart Araneta Coliseum	NU; 84.69	UP; 82.25	UST; 78.13	Adamson; 75.00	FEU; 74.94	La Salle; 70.88	UE; 68.88	Ateneo; 61.81	
2015^{e}	UP	Mall of Asia Arena	NU; 83.50	UST; 81.44	UP; 76.31	FEU; 72.94	UE; 72.88	La Salle; 67.31	Adamson; 64.19	Ateneo; 51.50	
2016^{e}^{f}	UST	Smart Araneta Coliseum	NU; 88.88	FEU; 82.31	Adamson; 81.88	UST; 81.25	UE; 80.63	La Salle; 70.06	Ateneo; 64.00		
2017^{e}^{g}	FEU	Mall of Asia Arena	Adamson; 85.94	UST; 79.81	UE; 79.31	FEU; 76.31	NU; 76.31	UP; 71.94	La Salle; 70.94	Ateneo; 69.81	
2018^{e}	NU	Mall of Asia Arena	NU; 88.88	FEU; 81.94	Adamson; 79.81	UST; 79.75	UE; 75.31	UP; 71.06	Ateneo; 69.75	La Salle; 57.44	
2019^{e}	Ateneo	Mall of Asia Arena	NU; 90.25	FEU; 88.25	Adamson; 82.31	UST; 81.25	UE; 80.63	UP; 77.83	Ateneo; 74.13	La Salle; 72.19	
2020^{h}	La Salle	The competition was suspended for a year.									
2021^{i}^{j}	La Salle	Mall of Asia Arena	FEU; 90.93	Adamson; 86.06	NU; 85.12	UST; 77.25	UE; 74.06	UP; 72.81	La Salle; 70.93	Ateneo; 61.06	
2022^{k}	Adamson	Mall of Asia Arena	NU; 90.38	FEU; 89.88	UST; 80.00	UE; 75.81	Adamson; 74.38	UP; 71.94	La Salle; 66.06	Ateneo; 62.81	
2023	UE	Mall of Asia Arena	FEU; 87.81	NU; 87.13	UST; 85.50	Adamson; 83.13	UP; 75.25	UE; 69.88	La Salle; 69.44	Ateneo; 66.50	
2024	UP	Mall of Asia Arena	NU; 89.13	Adamson; 84.94	FEU; 81.25	UE; 80.13	UST; 79.31	UP; 70.00	La Salle; 65.63	Ateneo; 61.25	
2025	UST	Mall of Asia Arena	NU; 86.87	Adamson; 82.37	FEU; 82.31	UE; 77.87	UST; 77.31	UP; 69.75	La Salle; 68.31	Ateneo; 54.56	
2026	FEU	Mall of Asia Arena	NU; 86.69	UE; 83.06	FEU; 80.94	Adamson; 79.56	UP; 74.56	La Salle; 70.69	UST; 67.19	Ateneo; 58.69	

Notes:

- ^a – The UAAP Board suspended the competition when a member from the UP Filipiniana figured in an accident during practice.
- ^b – In 1998, UST Salinggawi Dance Troupe did not join the competition because of injured members.
- ^c – De La Salle University was suspended from the league in 2006.
- ^d – Instead of the average score from the five judges, the ranking frequency system was used in ranking and declaring the winners for 2012 UAAP Cheerdance Competition. In the case of NU and UST, NU was declared as the 2nd runner up as 3 out of 5 judges voted for NU as the 3rd placer while 3 out of 5 judges voted for UST as the 4th placer despite the higher score of UST (85.56) than NU (85.16)
- ^e – Merit-based scoring was used in the criteria: 400 points for cheerleading elements and 400 points for dance elements; for a total score of 800. Scores displayed here are its percentage equivalent (e.g. Actual Score divided by 800 then multiplied to 100).
- ^f – University of the Philippines skipped UAAP Season 79 Cheerdance Competition
- ^g – The Far Eastern University and the National University finished the competition tied in the fourth place.
- ^h – In the 2nd quarter of 2020 the remainder of the UAAP Season 82 was scrapped due to the COVID-19 Pandemic. This canceled the 83rd Season as a whole in mid 2020 and the rest of 2021,
- ^i – UAAP Season 84 was scheduled to begin in 2021, but, due to the COVID-19 pandemic, UAAP's board of trustees decided to begin the season in March 2022. The UAAP Cheerdance Competition was held on May 22, 2022

== Group Stunts Division ==
Year	Host school	Champion	2nd place	3rd place	4th place	5th place	6th place	7th place	8th place	Ref.
2011	ATENEO	UP	FEU	NU						
2012	NU	UP	FEU	NU						
2013	AdU	NU	FEU	UST						
2014	UE	FEU; 86.17	UST; 83.67	NU; 79.83	UP; 78.33	UE; 67.50	AdU; 64.17	DLSU; 61.33		
2015	UP	UST	NU	FEU						
2016	UST	NU; 83.00	UST; 76.33	FEU; 68.00	AdU; 66.00	UE; 64.00				
2017	FEU	FEU; 76.33	AdU; 73.17	UP; 72.67	UST; 72.17	NU; 67.33	DLSU; 58.83			
2018	NU	NU	FEU	AdU	UE	UST	UP	DLSU		
2019	ATENEO	NU; 237 pts.	FEU; 223 pts.	AdU; 206 pts.	UE; 184 pts.	UST; 180 pts.	UP; 168 pts.	ATENEO; 156 pts.		
2020	DLSU	UST								
2021	DLSU	NU								
2022	AdU	FEU								
2023	UE	FEU								
2024	UP	NU								
2025	UST	NU								

== Other Awards ==
=== Stunner Awardees ===
Season	Year	Season host	Person	School of origin
71	2008	UP	Frances Fleta	UP
72	2009	FEU	Sari Campos	ATENEO
73	2010	DLSU	Nikka de Dios	DLSU
74	2011	ATENEO	Nesza Isabel Salvador	UP
75	2012	NU	Nicolette Erica Ambulo	UP
76	2013	AdU	Ana de Leon	DLSU
77	2014	UE	Camille Isabel Lagmay	UP
The award was discontinued.

=== Corporate Awards ===
Season	Year	Host	Award name	Awardee	Ref.
78	2015	UP	Eats so Easy move	Adamson University (AdU)	
78	2015	UP	Oishi Oh Wow Surprising move	Far Eastern University (FEU)	
78	2015	UP	Smart Prepaid Fearless Jump	University of Santo Tomas (UST)	
78	2015	UP	Yamaha Best Toss	University of the Philippines (UP)	
78	2015	UP	PLDT Fantastic move	University of the Philippines (UP)	
79	2016	UST	Best Toss	National University (NU)	
79	2016	UST	Best Pyramid	National University (NU)	
80	2017	FEU	Yamaha Toss	National University (NU)	
80	2017	FEU	Jollibee Inextrahan! Pyramid	Adamson University (AdU)	
81	2018	NU	Yamaha Toss	University of Santo Tomas (UST)	
82	2019	ATENEO	Juicy Cologne's Juicy-fied Pyramid	Grand winner: National University (NU); 1st runner-up: Adamson University (AdU); 2nd runner-up: University of the Philippines (UP)	
82	2019	ATENEO	AXA's Know You Can Stunt (Best in Pyramid)	National University (NU)	
82	2019	ATENEO	Yamaha's Best Toss	National University (NU)	
82	2019	ATENEO	Pure Gold's Always Panalo Move	Far Eastern University (FEU)	
83	2020	DLSU	No competition was held due to COVID-19		
84	2021	DLSU	Silka Best Awra Dance Move	National University (NU)	
84	2021	DLSU	Skechers Best Performance	Far Eastern University (FEU)	
85	2022	AdU	Palmolive Handa Ang Ganda Hair Moment	Far Eastern University (FEU)	
85	2022	AdU	Skechers Most Stylish Team	National University (NU)	
85	2022	AdU	Biogenic Best Pyramid	National University (NU)	
85	2022	AdU	Silka Best Awra Dance Move	National University (NU)	
86	2023	UE	Skechers Most Stylish Performance	Far Eastern University (FEU)	
86	2023	UE	Yamaha Most Unique Dance Move	Far Eastern University (FEU)	
86	2023	UE	BYS Best Toss	Far Eastern University (FEU)	
86	2023	UE	Juicy-fied Pyramid	Far Eastern University (FEU)	
86	2023	UE	Silka Best Awra Dance Move	Far Eastern University (FEU)	
87	2024	UP	Mwell Power Performance	National University (NU)	
87	2024	UP	Juicy-fied Pyramid	National University (NU)	
87	2024	UP	AIA Best Aerial Performance	National University (NU)	
87	2024	UP	Jollibee Best Toss	National University (NU)	
87	2024	UP	Silka Stay Lit Dance Move	National University (NU)	
87	2024	UP	Skechers Stylish Performance	National University (NU)	
87	2024	UP	Yamaha Most Unique Dance Move	National University (NU)	
87	2024	UP	Max Most Synchronized Dance Move	National University (NU)	
88	2025	UST	Mwell Power Performance	National University (NU)	
88	2025	UST	Silka Time To Shine Showstopper	National University (NU)	
88	2025	UST	Converge Super FiberX Reliable Performance	National University (NU)	
88	2025	UST	Yamaha Most Unique Dance Move	National University (NU)	
88	2025	UST	Biogenic Armor Up Pyramid	Adamson University (AdU)	
88	2025	UST	Enervon Most Energetic Team	Adamson University (AdU)	
88	2025	UST	Skechers Stylish Performance	Adamson University (AdU)	
89	2026	FEU	Ford Electrifying Tumbling Pass	Far Eastern University (FEU)	
89	2026	FEU	Rise Energy Pop Energizing	National University (NU)	
89	2026	FEU	Cetaphil Fresh Dance of the Season	University of the East (UE)	
89	2026	FEU	Hana Slow Down Shine On	University of the East (UE)	
89	2026	FEU	Mwell Healthy Moves	National University (NU)	
89	2026	FEU	Skechers Performance in Style	National University (NU)	
89	2026	FEU	Chingu Café Bestie	University of the Philippines (UP)	
89	2026	FEU	Yamaha Most Unique Dance Move	University of the East (UE)	

== Championship table ==
Main Cheerdance Competition

School	Last Championship	Last Top 3 Appearance	Rank			Total	Championship Rank
School	Last Championship	Last Top 3 Appearance	1st place, gold medalist(s)	2nd place, silver medalist(s)	3rd place, bronze medalist(s)	Total	Championship Rank
National University	2026	2026	10	1	2	13	1
University of the Philippines	2012	2015	8	6	6	20	2
University of Santo Tomas	2006	2023	8	6	5	19	3
Far Eastern University	2023	2026	4	8	13	25	4
Adamson University	2017	2025	1	4	3	8	5
De La Salle University	—	2013	—	3	2	5	6
University of the East	—	2026	—	2	1	3	7
Ateneo de Manila University	—	2009	—	1	—	1	8

Note: The UAAP Cheerdance Competition for Season 84 (2021–2022) was delayed and held in May 2022.

Group Stunts Division

School	Last Championship	Last Top 3 Appearance	Rank			Total	Championship Rank
School	Last Championship	Last Top 3 Appearance	1st place, gold medalist(s)	2nd place, silver medalist(s)	3rd place, bronze medalist(s)	Total	Championship Rank
National University	2019	2019	4	1	3	8	1
Far Eastern University	2017	2019	2	5	2	9	2
University of the Philippines	2012	2017	2	—	1	3	3
University of Santo Tomas	2015	2016	1	2	1	4	4
Adamson University	—	2019	—	1	2	3	5
University of the East	—	—	—	—	—	0	6
De La Salle University	—	—	—	—	—	0	7
Ateneo De Manila University	—	—	—	—	—	0	8

The group stunt competition was discontinued 2020 onwards following the COVID-19 pandemic.

== See also ==
- UAAP Street Dance Competition
- NCAA Cheerleading Competition
- List of domestic club championship attendance: UAAP Cheerdance Competition in a global context.
- UP–UST rivalry
