= UST Yellow Jackets =

Official pep squad and drumline

- Abbreviation: UST YJ
- Formation: 1993
- Type: pep squad and drumline
- Affiliations: University of Santo Tomas
- Formerly called: UST Bangers (1993–1997)

The UST Yellow Jackets (abbreviated as UST YJ or simply YJ) is the official pep squad and drumline of the University of Santo Tomas. Together with the UST Salinggawi Dance Troupe, the UST YJ form the official cheerdance team of the University of Santo Tomas in the UAAP Cheerdance Competition. The UST Yellow Jackets also perform for halftime during the games of the UST Growling Tigers, the Men's Basketball team of the university in the University Athletic Association of the Philippines.

The UST Yellow Jackets live by the motto, "Suaviter in Modo, Fortiter in Re".

== History ==
The organization was founded by Michael Ismael Flores (aka Ancient Mike) from Baliwag, Bulacan, who first joined a dedicated P.E. Class-Cheering Squad (by his mentor Mr. Mike Silbor) in 1990 as a cheerleader. He was the first official resident cheerleader from 1990-1992. In August 1993, he formed the UST Bangers. All 8 pioneering members were initially hardcore head-banging, ear-pounding cheer drummers; hence, the name "Bangers" was coined. The group was formed during the beginning of the 4-peat era of the UST Men's Basketball Team. The UST Department of Physical Education (now known as the Institute of Physical Education & Athletics) officially recognized his leadership and his team under the said name.

GO USTE! was created by Ancient Mike in 1992. The original chant had a slower tempo and lower pitch (just like that of Vanilla Ice's Go Ninja).

In 1995, the first halftime cheer was done by a lone member of the group, Richie Medalla. It was at a women's basketball game, done over a dare to do the cheers of UST, traditional style. Then soon, others wanted in the action, cheering during pregame and halftime on the court. In 1997, the group became the official pep squad of the university under the name "UST Yellow Jackets" and was placed under UST's Institute of Physical Education and Athletics (IPEA). Under IPEA, the organization was placed under the advisory of Mr. Robinson Laxa (1994-2007), Mr. Raymond Anselmo (2008–2016), Mr. Teodoro Dela Peña (2016–2019), Mr. Al Denn Lozada (2019-2020), and Mrs. Pauline Gabayan (2020-Present).

The group got its name, as suggested by Richie Medalla from the insect, yellow jacket which is part of the wasp family and known for their black and yellow stripes (the university colors of UST).

== Logo ==
The original logo of the UST Yellow Jackets was designed by Franco Cachero (Batch '97, '99). It was a simple banner with the letters USTYJ on top and MDCXI at the bottom. The upper letters were larger than those on the lower part and the "UST" font was in white Times New Roman while the "YJ" font was in undefined yellow font. The "MDCXI" simply pertains to 1611, the year which UST was founded, in Roman numerals. This was later changed to Est. 1993, which was the original date of the establishment of the organization under the name UST Bangers. A wasp, or the yellow jacket, was then added by Alfred Tanopo (Batch 2003) beneath the revised logo to further define the identity of the group.

== Officers ==
Year	President	Head Drummer	Head Cheerleader	Secretary	Asst. Secretary	Treasurer	Auditor	P.R.O.
2000	Mark San Juan	Tristan Granados	Adrian Garcia	Candice Barilea		Sam Malli		Christer Gaudiano
2001	Franco Cachero	Matt Santiago	Adrian Garcia	Christer Gaudiano		Candice Barilea		Froilan Pitpit & Jabo Vicente
2002	Franco Cachero	RJ Gayondato	Adrian Garcia	Christer Gaudiano		Vanna De Leon		Vanessa De Castro
2003	Billy Pineda	Errol Martin	Jepi Peralta	Joseph Silverio		Je Marquez		Jed Regala
2004	Je Marquez	Joseph Silverio	Jepi Peralta	Jed Velarde		Miko Livelo		Jed Regala
2005	Miko Livelo	Neil Tin	Jed Regala	Jed Velarde		Elyan Oblifias		Josephine Donato
2006	Donn Carlo Alicante	RJ Mallari	Angelo Cachero	Raymond Agustin		Babs Corpuz		Miko Livelo
2007	Jed Regala	RJ Mallari	Joseph Regla	Raymond Agustin	Mark Mendoza	Babs Corpuz	Ace Mendoza	Mico Letargo
2008	Raymond Agustin	Jeff Gorriceta	Mark Jimenez	Mark Lean Mendoza	Carlos Montesclaros	Ace Mendoza	Lesley Ann Vivero	Jolo Livelo
2009	Jeff Gorriceta	Marco Carlos	Edan Andan	Carlos Montesclaros	Miko de Vera	Patrick Isla	Angelo Genuino	Chris Gerard Ortiz
2010	Gian Rosanes	Marco Carlos	Patrick Peñacerrada	Art Villaluz	Roy Robles	Neil Zorilla	Vernice Ortiz	Chris Gerard Ortiz
2011	Miko De Vera	John Raymond Roque	Jimson Mirador	Art Villaluz	Leo Marco Adriano	Neil Zorilla	Renz Garcia	Raymund Salumbides
2012	Marco Roberto Carlos	Irvin Jason Layno	Jimson Mirador	Leo Marco Adriano	Edmir Capuno	Ver Gabriel Bedaño	Gilbert Campos	Raymund Salumbides
2013	Leo Marco Adriano	Irvin Jason Layno	Jimson Mirador	Edmir Capuno	Jerica Dela Cruz	Gilbert Campos	Joseph Tan	Raymund Salumbides
2014	Judd Usita	Joseph Tan	Shan Mercado	Aries Annang	Rallion Bautista	Gilbert Campos	Christian Esmael	Raymund Salumbides
2015	Alvin Tong	Rallion Bautista	Shan Mercado	Aries Annang	Patricia Viola	Joshua Coronel	Edward Pancho	Louie Espejo
2016	Judd Usita	Rallion Bautista	Noel Zorilla	Patricia Viola	Myka Ibarrola	Edward Pancho	Junel Fronda	Raymund Salumbides
2017	Lorenzo Galvez	Earl Ello	Jerome Gulinao	Seatiel Chavez	Myka Ibarrola	Junel Fronda	Paolo Hilario	Edmer Diaz
2018	Eriko Macatangay	Earl Ello	Jerome Gulinao	Ezra Viola	Juan Hizon	Chile Chaguile	Jude Acibo	Sean Abela
2019	Earl Ello	Angelo Abella	Mark Lopez	Juan Hizon	Adriene Alladin	Bryan Collantes	Isaac Nuque	Randonn Belen
2020	Isaac Nuque	Ervin Cruz	Randonn Belen	Adriene Alladin	Joel Baquiran Jr.	Alyssa Libed	Kathleen De Ramos	Roshir De Castro
2021	Isaac Nuque	Ervin Cruz	Randonn Belen	Adriene Alladin	Mikhaela Ballano	Janaya Manalad	Adriane Sudla	Mark Rafer
2022	Isaac Nuque	Anton Mata	Adriane Sudla	Mikhaela Ballano	MJ Torres	Janaya Manalad	Myka Adriano	Charm Torres
2023	Anton Mata	Ralph Calas	Raeza Jacob & Joe Montoro	Rikka Parafina	Virgo Viola	Ingrid Villaruz	Dhea Sillano	Charm Torres
2024	Adriane Sudla	Ralph Calas	Joe Montoro	Virgo Viola	Gelene Pesico	Ingrid Villaruz	Stephanie Veloso	Charm Torres

== Awards ==
The UST Yellow Jackets and the UST Salinggawi Dance Troupe, jointly, are tied with the UP Pep Squad for having the most number of UAAP Cheerdance Competition championships. As of today, both UST and UP have won 8 championships. They also have the longest championship run in the said competition with 5; from 2002 and 2006.

Event	Year	Award
Jollibee Chi-Cheer Kayo Challenge (UAAP)	1994	Champion
Jollibee Chi-Cheer Kayo Challenge (UAAP)	1995	Champion; Best Jollibee Cheer
Jollibee Chi-Cheer Kayo Challenge (UAAP)	1996	Champion
Jollibee Chi-Cheer Kayo Challenge (UAAP)	1997	Champion; Hall of Fame Awardee
Nestlé Magnolia Crunch Cheering Competition	1999	1st Runner Up
Nestlé Non-Stop UAAP Cheerdance Competition	2000	1st Runner Up
Nestlé Non-Stop UAAP Cheerdance Competition	2001	2nd Runner Up
Puspusan Sa Busan Cheering Competition	2002	1st Runner Up
Nestlé Non-Stop UAAP Cheerdance Competition	2002	Champion
Nestlé Non-Stop UAAP Cheerdance Competition	2003	Champion
Nestlé Non-Stop UAAP Cheerdance Competition	2004	Champion
Nestlé Non-Stop UAAP Cheerdance Competition	2005	Champion
UAAP Cheerdance Competition	2006	Champion
Samsung UAAP Cheerdance Competition	2007	1st Runner Up
Samsung UAAP Cheerdance Competition	2008	1st Runner Up
Samsung UAAP Cheerdance Competition	2010	2nd Runner Up
UAAP Cheerdance Competition	2014	2nd Runner Up
UAAP Cheerdance Competition	2015	1st Runner Up
UAAP Cheerdance Competition	2016	4th Place
UAAP Cheerdance Competition	2017	2nd Runner Up
UAAP Cheerdance Competition	2018	4th Place
UAAP Cheerdance Competition	2019	4th Place
UAAP Cheerdance Competition	2021	4th Place
UAAP Cheerdance Competition	2022	2nd Runner Up
UAAP Cheerdance Competition	2023	2nd Runner Up

== See also ==
- UST Growling Tigers
- Salinggawi Dance Troupe
- UAAP Cheerdance Competition
