= UAAP Street Dance Competition =

School street dance competition

- Sport: Street dance
- Founded: 2011
- No. of teams: 15 teams: 8 - Seniors; 7 - Juniors
- Country: Philippines
- Most recent champions: Season 88 (2026); Collegiate – UP Streetdance Club; High School – Adamson University Dance Company – Street SHS
- Broadcasters: One Sports, Pilipinas Live

The UAAP Street Dance Competition is an annual event of the University Athletic Association of the Philippines (UAAP) during the closing ceremonies. This is to encourage more students to watch since few spectators attend the closing ceremonies, where players are awarded for their performance. Results of the street dance competition, together with the drum line competition, will not be added to the computation of the overall championship of the UAAP.

Nonetheless, in Season 88, the league decided to finally hold the Street Dance competition as a standalone event, separate from the closing ceremonies.

== Participants ==
=== Seniors division ===
School	Street Dance Team
Adamson University (AdU)	Adamson University Dance Company – Street
Ateneo de Manila University	Company of Ateneo Dancers – Street
De La Salle University (DLSU)	La Salle Dance Company – Street
Far Eastern University (FEU)	FEU Street Alliance
National University (NU)	NU Dance Company
University of the East (UE)	UE - East Force Dance Company (UE Red Warriors Dance Crew / UE Armada: 2011–2017) (UE Street Warriors: 2017–2019)
University of the Philippines (UP)	UP Streetdance Club
University of Santo Tomas (UST)	UST Prime (UST Salinggawi Dance Troupe: 2011–2015); UST Hype Crew: 2016

=== Juniors division ===
School	Street Dance Team
Adamson University (AdU)	Adamson University Dance Company – Street SHS
Ateneo de Manila University	Indayog ng Atenistang Kabataan
De La Salle Zobel (DLSZ)	Zobel Dance Crew
Far Eastern University (FEU)	T.A.M Streetz
National University (NU)	NU Dance Company – Nazalian Street
University of the East (UE)	UE East Force Varsity
University of the Philippines (UP)	UP Junior Streetdance Team
University of Santo Tomas (UST)	UST Galvanize

== Rules ==
=== Basic rules ===
1. One official team per UAAP-member university
2. 15-20 UAAP-eligible students
3. Up to 2 substitutes 12 hours before the competition

=== Performance ===
1. Maximum routine length is 3 minutes – :30 entrance, 2:30 routine and :30 exit
2. All cheer stunts and pyramids are prohibited
3. All tosses are not allowed

=== Scoring system ===
==== Until Season 80 ====
===== Performance criteria =====
Performance criteria control 60% of the total score.

- Creativity (10)
- Spacing, formation, staging (10)
- Showmanship (10)
- Attire (10)
- Entertainment value (10)
- Variety of styles (10)

===== Skills criteria =====
Skills criteria control 40% of the total score.

- Musicality (10)
- Timing (10)
- Execution (10)
- Difficulty of styles (10)

==== Season 80 ====
===== Performance criteria =====
Performance criteria control 50% of the total score.

- Creativity (5)
- Spacing, formation, staging (10)
- Attire (5)
- Entertainment value and showmanship (10)
- Variety of styles (10)
- Overall choreography (10)

===== Skills criteria =====
Skills criteria control 50% of the total score.

- Musicality (5)
- Timing (5)
- Technique Foundation (10)
- Difficulty (10)
- Strength and Control (10)
- Execution of 4 Required Styles (10)
  - At least 2 old school and 2 new school

==== Summary of deductions ====
1. Incomplete crew members upon start of the routine (1)
2. Grandstanding (staying on the stage for too long (beyond 30 seconds) before and after performance) (1)
3. Major fall per occurrence (unrecoverable stunt, lift or support) (1)
4. Minor fall per occurrence (highly noticeable accidental error: trips, falls, stumbles) (0.5)
5. Boundaries (not within the boundary lines/occurrence) (0.5)
6. Music
  - Not within the required time/length (1)
  - Inappropriate language per occurrence (1)
7. Lighting and effects
  - Usage of effects and inappropriate (1)
8. Steps (Lewd gestures and movement per occurrence) (1)
9. Attire & props (per occurrence)
  - Use of prohibited props (1)
  - Tossed clothing (1)
  - Used of prohibited attire (head to toe) (1)
10. Tumbling violations (per occurrence) (1)
11. Dance lifts/partnering violations (per occurrence) (1)

== Results ==
=== Seniors' division ===
Year	Season host	Venue	Champion	2nd place	3rd place	4th place	5th place	6th place	7th place	8th place	Ref.
2011	La Salle	Araneta Coliseum; Quezon City	La Salle; 91.00	UP; 88.25	Ateneo; 86.67	UE; 83.67	UST; 76.83	FEU; 72.17	Adamson; 70.83	NU; 64.75	
2012	Ateneo	PICC Forum; Pasay	La Salle; 88.98	UP; 86.40	Ateneo; 84.64	FEU; 82.42	Adamson; 75.88	NU; 72.16	UST; 71.50	UE; 71.00	
2013	NU	SM North Skydome; Quezon City	UP; 91.17	La Salle; 86.75	Adamson; 84.25						
2014	Adamson	No competition was held.									
2015	UE	SM Mall of Asia Arena; Pasay	UP; 178.00	Ateneo; 167.30	La Salle; 167.00	Adamson; 160.30	FEU; 151.30	UST; 143.70	UE; 137.00	NU; 126.50	
2016 (Note: Four judges ranked the seven crews from first (1) to seventh (7). At the end of the competition, all rankings were added and the crew with the lowest tally was declared the winner.) (Note: NU Underdawgz did not compete this season.)	UP	SM Mall of Asia Arena; Pasay	UP; 7.00	La Salle; 11.00	UST; 12.00	Ateneo; 14.00	FEU; 17.00	UE; 24.00	Adamson; 25.00		
2017	UST	UST Plaza Mayor; Manila	La Salle; 89.00	UP; 88.75	UST; 85.75	UE; 83.25	FEU; 79.25	Ateneo; 78.50	Adamson; 75.00		
2018	FEU	SM Mall of Asia Arena; Pasay	FEU; 85.75	La Salle; 79.50	UP; 78.60	UST; 75.60	UE; 72.20	Ateneo; 69.00	NU; 67.50	Adamson; 57.50	
2019	NU	Smart Araneta Coliseum; Quezon City	La Salle; 86.50	FEU; 85.00	NU; 83.25	UP; 82.00	UST; 79.00	UE; 72.42	Ateneo; 67.45	Adamson; 67.45	
2020	Ateneo	Cancelled due to COVID-19 pandemic.									
2021	La Salle	Cancelled due to COVID-19 pandemic.									
2023	Adamson	SM Mall of Asia Arena; Pasay	UST; 448.00	NU; 446.00	UP; 437.00	Adamson; 434.00	Ateneo; 430.00	FEU; 428.00	La Salle; 420.00		
2024	UE	SM Mall of Asia Arena; Pasay	UST; 90.50	FEU; 89.17	UP; 86.33	Ateneo; 86.17	NU; 84.59	Adamson; 83.17	La Salle; 82.33		
2025	UP	SM Mall of Asia Arena; Pasay	UP; 89.33	UST; 88.57	La Salle; 86.17	FEU; 85.03	Ateneo; 83.83	NU; 81.87	Adamson; 81.30	UE; 71.00	
2026	UST	Blue Eagle Gym; Quezon City	UP; 93.33	UST; 92.17	La Salle; 90.33	Ateneo; 89.83	Adamson; 89.83	NU; 89.00	FEU; 87.83	UE; 79.67	

=== Juniors' division ===
Year	Season host	Venue	Champion	2nd place	3rd place	4th place	5th place	6th place	7th place	8th place	Ref.
2018 (Note: Ateneo did not compete this season.)	FEU	SM Mall of Asia Arena; Pasay	UST; 82.30	FEU; 71.50	UE; 71.10	La Salle; 67.00	NU; 63.30	Adamson; 60.00	UP; 55.70		
2019	NU	Smart Araneta Coliseum; Quezon City	UST; 80.10	UE; 74.50	FEU; 74.45	NU; 72.13	La Salle; 67.40	UP; 64.15	Adamson; 60.90		
2020	Ateneo	Cancelled due to COVID-19 pandemic.									
2021	La Salle	Cancelled due to COVID-19 pandemic.									
2023	Adamson	SM Mall of Asia Arena; Pasay	UST; 437.50	Adamson; 393.50	FEU; 376.00						
2024	UE	SM Mall of Asia Arena; Pasay	UST; 86.17	Adamson; 84.50	NU; 79.33	La Salle					
2025	UP	SM Mall of Asia Arena; Pasay	NU; 82.83	Ateneo; 80.97	Adamson; 78.57	UST; 75.83	La Salle; 64.33				
2026	UST	Blue Eagle Gym; Quezon City	Adamson	UST	FEU						

== Championship table ==
=== Collegiate division ===
School	Last Championship	Last Top 3 Appearance	Rank			Total
School	Last Championship	Last Top 3 Appearance	1st place, gold medalist(s)	2nd place, silver medalist(s)	3rd place, bronze medalist(s)	Total
University of the Philippines	2026	2026	5	3	3	11
De La Salle University	2019	2026	4	3	3	10
University of Santo Tomas	2024	2026	2	2	2	6
Ateneo de Manila University	—	2015	—	1	2	3
Far Eastern University	2018	2024	1	2	—	3
National University	—	2023	—	1	1	2
Adamson University	—	2013	—	—	1	1
University of the East	—	—	—	—	—	—

=== High school division ===
School	Last Championship	Last Top 3 Appearance	Rank			Total
School	Last Championship	Last Top 3 Appearance	1st place, gold medalist(s)	2nd place, silver medalist(s)	3rd place, bronze medalist(s)	Total
University of Santo Tomas	2024	2026	4	1	–	5
National University	2025	2025	1	–	1	2
Adamson University	2026	2026	1	2	1	3
Far Eastern University	–	2026	–	1	3	43
University of the East	–	2019	–	1	1	2
Ateneo de Manila University	–	2025	–	1	–	1
De La Salle Zobel	–	–	–	–	–	–
University of the Philippines	–	–	–	–	–	–

== See also ==
- UAAP Cheerdance Competition
- NCAA Street Dance Competition
