= UAAP Season 67 =

University athletic year

- "Animo UAAP: Shooting for the Stars"
- Host school: De La Salle University

Overall
- Seniors: University of Santo Tomas
- Juniors: University of Santo Tomas

Seniors' champions
Sport		Men	Women
Basketball		FEU	N/A

Juniors' champions
Sport		Boys	Girls
Basketball		Ateneo	N/A
- (NT) = No tournament; (DS) = Demonstration Sport; (Ex) = Exhibition;

UAAP Season 67 is the 2004–05 athletic year of the University Athletic Association of the Philippines (UAAP), which was hosted by De La Salle University-Manila. The season opened on July 10, 2004.

== Basketball ==
=== Elimination round ===
Pos	Team	W	L	PCT	GB	Qualification
1	FEU Tamaraws	11	3	.786	—	Twice-to-beat in the semifinals
2	De La Salle Green Archers (Note: This "final" team standings is overturned when La Salle forfeited their games after the season was over. See La Salle forfeiture of the championship for details.) (H)	10	4	.714 (Note: Second-seed playoff: La Salle 82–69 Ateneo)	1	Twice-to-beat in the semifinals
3	Ateneo Blue Eagles	10	4	.714	1	Twice-to-win in the semifinals
4	UE Red Warriors	8	6	.571	3	Twice-to-win in the semifinals
5	UP Fighting Maroons	7	7	.500	4	
6	Adamson Falcons	5	9	.357	6	
7	UST Growling Tigers	4	10	.286	7	
8	NU Bulldogs	1	13	.071	10	

Source: UBelt.com
Rules for classification: 1) winning percentage; 2) if tied for top 4 seeds, one-game playoff; 3) head-to-head record; 4) head-to-head point differential; 5) overall point differential
(H) Hosts

=== Bracket ===
Semifinals (Top 2 twice-to-beat)
1	FEU	71
4	UE	64
2	~~La Salle~~	~~69~~
3	Ateneo	~~55~~

Finals (Best-of-three playoff)
1	FEU	~~51~~	67	~~65~~
2	~~La Salle~~	~~58~~	57	~~68~~

After La Salle's two ineligible players were discovered after UAAP Season 68, all of their games from Season 66–68 were forfeited. Prior to the forfeiture, La Salle returned their Season 67 championship trophy and their Season 68 runner-up trophy. The UAAP Board subsequently awarded the trophy to FEU in 2006.

== Cheerdance ==
The Cheerdance Competition was held on September 12, 2004 at the Araneta Coliseum.

Order	Pep squad	Score
1st	UST Salinggawi Dance Troupe	93.61
2nd	UP Pep Squad	90.56
3rd	FEU Cheering Squad	87.09
4th	Ateneo Blue Babble Battalion	85.79
5th	DLSU Animo Squad	84.97
6th	Adamson Pep Squad	84.76
7th	UE Pep Squad	79.52
8th	NU Pep Squad	68.44

== Overall championship race ==
=== Juniors' division ===
Rank	Team	Points
1	UST	115
2	UE	97
3	DLSZ (H)	86
4	Ateneo	81
5	UPIS	67
6	NU	22
7	Adamson	20

(H) Season host.
Notes: Results are final.

=== Seniors' division ===
Rank	Team	Points
1	UST	285
2	UP	279
3	La Salle (H)	224
4	Ateneo	201
5	FEU	170
6	UE	166
7	Adamson	82
8	NU	18

(H) Season host.
Notes: Results are final.

=== Individual awards ===
Athletes of the Year:

- Men: Daniel Hicban (Ateneo Blue Eagles, football)
- Women: Aewon Arayi (Adamson Lady Falcons, basketball)
- Boys: Nelson Mariano III (UE Junior Red Warriors, chess)
- Girls: Louise Sarmiento (UST Junior Tigresses, swimming)

== See also ==
- NCAA Season 80
