= UAAP Season 25 men's basketball tournament =

Basketball competition in the Philippines

1962 UAAP season
- Host school: National University
Men's Finals	G1	Wins
UP Parrots	55	0
UE Red Warriors	70	1
- Duration: October 6, 1962
- Arena(s): Rizal Memorial Coliseum
- Winning coach: Baby Dalupan

The 1962 UAAP men's basketball tournament was the 25th year of the men's tournament of the University Athletic Association of the Philippines (UAAP)'s basketball championship. Hosted by National University, the UE Warriors defeated the UP Parrots in a single game finals taking their fourth UAAP men's basketball championship.

== Participating schools ==
Teams
Far Eastern University Tamaraws
National University Bulldogs
University of the East Warriors
University of the Philippines Parrots
University of Santo Tomas Glowing Goldies

== Finals ==
Underrated University of the East recaptured the UAAP senior cage championship by demolishing University of the Philippines, 70-55, before a crowd of 5,000 at the Rizal Memorial Coliseum. The Warriors lost the title to Far Eastern University the previous year.

Coach Baby Dalupan's team secured victory through scoring of Carlos Quitzon, Angelito Flores and Norman de Vera, rebounding by Godofredo Realubit and Jimmy Mariano, and defensive plays by rookie Nathaniel Canson.

Preceded by Season 24 (1961)	UAAP basketball seasons Season 25 (1962) basketball	Succeeded by Season 26 (1963)
