= UAAP Season 24 men's basketball tournament =

Basketball competition in the Philippines

1961 UAAP season
- Host school: Far Eastern University
Men's Finals	G1	Wins
FEU Tamaraws	105	1
UE Red Warriors	84	0
- Duration: September 30, 1961
- Arena(s): Rizal Memorial Coliseum
- Finals MVP: Romy Diaz
- Winning coach: Jose "Peping" Yee

The 1961 UAAP men's basketball tournament was the 24th year of the men's tournament of the University Athletic Association of the Philippines (UAAP)'s basketball championship. Hosted by Far Eastern University, the FEU Tamaraws defeated the UE Warriors in a single game finals taking their sixth overall UAAP men's basketball championship.

== Participating schools ==
Teams
Far Eastern University Tamaraws
Manila Central University Tigers
National University Bulldogs
University of the East Warriors
University of the Philippines Parrots
University of Santo Tomas Glowing Goldies

== Finals ==
Far Eastern University's five-year long quest for a UAAP basketball diadem came to an end when it trampled University of the East, 105–84, before 8,000 fans at the Rizal Memorial Coliseum.

The Tamaraws swept their title-round engagements to win the UAAP flag.

The victory was FEU's first championship since 1956 and its sixth since the loop was born in 1938. UE deprived the Tamaraws the title by a margin of only one point during the previous year's finals.

Coach Peping Yee used only eight men — Arturo Valenzona, Romy Diaz, Rohimust Santos, Oscar Lopez, Domiciano and Alberto Legaspi, Josefino Roa, and season MVP Joselino Roa — in fashioning out the easy vengeance win.

The Tamaraws outdueled the Warriors in a frenzied shooting battle to take the halftime lead, 51–37. An air-tight zone defense rattled UE throughout and a brilliant teamwork, spearheaded by Arturo Valenzona who tallied 32 points, spelled the victory for FEU.

Romy Diaz win in his first Uaap Finals MVP

Preceded by Season 23 (1960)	UAAP basketball seasons Season 24 (1961) basketball	Succeeded by Season 25 (1962)
