= UAAP Season 65 =

University athletic year

- "Youth of Today, Future of Tomorrow, Searching for a New Beginning"
- Host school: National University

Overall
- Seniors: University of Santo Tomas
- Juniors: University of Santo Tomas

Seniors' champions
Sport		Men	Women
Basketball		Ateneo	La Salle
Volleyball		UST	FEU
Chess		La Salle	La Salle
Table tennis		UST	FEU

Juniors' champions
Sport		Boys	Girls
Basketball		UP	N/A
Volleyball		UE	La Salle
Chess		UE	
- (NT) = No tournament; (DS) = Demonstration Sport; (Ex) = Exhibition;

UAAP Season 65 is the 2002–2003 season of the University Athletic Association of the Philippines, which was hosted by National University. The season opened on July 13, 2002.

Broadcast by ABS-CBN Sports aired on Studio 23 for the third consecutive year. The theme music of the UAAP was "Energy III" composed by Craig Palmer recorded in the late 1980s at Network Music Ensemble.

== Basketball ==
=== Men's tournament ===
==== Elimination round ====
Pos	Team	W	L	PCT	GB	Qualification
1	De La Salle Green Archers	13	1	.929	—	Twice-to-beat in the semifinals
2	UE Red Warriors	10	4	.714	3	Twice-to-beat in the semifinals
3	Ateneo Blue Eagles	9	5	.643	4	Twice-to-win in the semifinals
4	UST Growling Tigers	8	6	.571	5	Twice-to-win in the semifinals
5	FEU Tamaraws	6	8	.429	7	
6	UP Fighting Maroons	5	9	.357	8	
7	Adamson Falcons	3	11	.214	10	
8	NU Bulldogs (H)	2	12	.143	11	

Rules for classification: 1) winning percentage; 2) if tied for top 4 seeds, one-game playoff; 3) head-to-head record; 4) head-to-head point differential; 5) overall point differential
(H) Hosts

==== Bracket ====
Semifinals (Top 2 twice-to-beat)
1	La Salle	97
4	UST	84
2	UE	78	70
3	Ateneo	84	72

Finals (Best-of-three playoff)
1	La Salle	70	85	70
3	Ateneo	72	77	77

== Overall championship race ==
=== Juniors' division ===
Rank	Team	Points
1	UST	97
2	UE	94
3	DLSZ	81
4	Ateneo	79
5	UPIS	76
6	NU (H)	22
7	Adamson	8

(H) Season host.
Notes: Results are final.

=== Seniors' division ===
Rank	Team	Points
1	UST	295
2	La Salle	273
3	UP	248
4	UE	190
5	Ateneo	174
6	FEU	148
7	Adamson	87
8	NU (H)	18

(H) Season host.
Notes: Results are final.

== List of Most Valuable Players ==
=== Seniors' division ===
- Jose Enrico Villanueva (Ateneo, men's basketball)
- Narciza Minerva (Adamson, women's basketball)
- Anthony Irvin Guiao (UST, men's volleyball)
- Ailyn Ege (FEU, women's volleyball)
- Mark Madrona (UE, men's football)
- Mariella Benitez (La Salle, women's football)
- Joseph Orillana (La Salle, men's baseball)
- Ediza Yator (UE, women's softball)
- Evan Grabador (UE, men's swimming)
- Michelle Nisce (La Salle, women's swimming)
- Oliver Dimakiling (La Salle, men's chess)
- Shercila Cua (UST, women's chess)
- Art Tomas Calingasan (UST, men's tennis)
- Sommer Bisagas (La Salle, women's tennis)
- Harold Baring (UST, men's table tennis)
- Rhoda Casino (UST, women's table tennis)
- Ralph Waldy Soguilon (La Salle, men's athletics)
- Mercedita Manipol (UE, women's athletics)
- Lloyd Escoses (FEU, men's badminton)
- Paula Lynn Obañana (La Salle, women's badminton)
- Rolando Canlas (UE, men's fencing)
- Ma. Dinah Remolacio (UP, women's fencing)
- Charles Adam Oliver (UST, men's judo)
- Jennifer Labon (UP, women's judo)
- Tshomlee Go (UP, men's taekwondo)
- Kristine Silverian Calulo (UP, women's taekwondo)

=== Juniors' division ===
- Marcy Arellano (UE, boys' basketball)
- Jerico Magno (UE, boys' volleyball)
- Priscilla Mae Trinidad (La Salle, girls' volleyball)
- Roland Lester Guballa (Ateneo, boys' athletics)
- Ronald Papa (Ateneo, boys' swimming)
- Lea Langit (UST, girls' swimming)
- John Paul Gomez (La Salle, boys' chess)
- Jojo Von de Guzman (UST, boys' taekwondo)
- Michael John Brieva (UE, boys' table tennis)

== See also ==
- NCAA Season 78
