= UST Salinggawi Dance Troupe =

University-wide organization

Salinggawi Dance Troupe
- Sport: Dance and Cheerleading
- Founded: 1968
- Based in: University of Santo Tomas
- Colors: Gold, black, and white
- Championships: 14
- Current Choreographer(s): Mark Anthony Chaiwalla, Robert Stephen Biadoma
- Website: UST Salinggawi Dance Troupe on Facebook

The UST Salinggawi Dance Troupe (or simply Salinggawi or SDT), is the University-wide organization for dance and the official dance troupe of the University of Santo Tomas (UST). The group is known for its versatility covering wide array of genre from performing arts to cheerleading, from contemporary to breakdancing. The Salinggawi Dance Troupe is also the official cheerdance team along with the official pep squad and drumline - the UST Yellow Jackets of the University of Santo Tomas. The group also performs for the halftime during the games of the UST Growling Tigers, the university's Men's Basketball team in the University Athletic Association of the Philippines. The group is also the official team of the University to Skecher's Streetdance Competition.

Salinggawi is derived from the Filipino phrase "Salin ng mga dating Gawi at Lahi", which translates to "transfer of customs and traditions" in English.

== History ==
It was established in 1967 as the cultural group of UST. It was the year when the former Philippine first lady Mrs. Imelda Marcos stirred the climate of the country for cultural rebirth. The formation of the dance troupe was spearheaded by Mrs. Emerita E. Basilio, an authority on the Philippine folk dance and a former directress of the women section of the Physical Education Department. Along with her in this task are other dance teachers namely: Mrs. Delly Nabong, Mrs. Carmen Cruz, Mrs. Arce Garcia and volunteered students. Other founders include Prof. Rod Escobar Cantiveros, faculty member of Artlets, Engineering and UST High School, and administrative assistant at the Office of Public and Alumni Affairs, who was in charge of publicity and promotion; and Prof. Ramon Dellosa of the School of Fine Arts and Architecture. Prof. Cantiveros did the research for the name SALINGAWI, to develop the brand of the new cultural dance troupe which would compete with Bayanihan, Barangay Dance Troupe and Folklorico. The 1st word: SALIN means transfer, mobility, and GAWI means way of life, our own culture. Salinggawi, transfer of customes and traditions thru the dances.Prof. Basilio and the rest of the founders approved the name. The transcribed researchers of dances were interpreted into steps and expression, thus, creating a stage presentation out of the repetitious classroom exercises. Since its founding in 1967, Salingawi Dance Troupe had been invited to welcome foreign tourists and became a regular cultural group at restaurant owned by the famous Reyes family and some out of town performances. Magazines and news features gave Salinggawi Dance Troupe as one of the major dance companies in the Philippines. From months of refining and polishing the group transformed it into a performance on December 16, 1968. Known for its class and grace, UST SDT is one of the most awarded, most popular and most sought-after cheering/dance troupe in UAAP and in the Philippines alongside its archrival yet U.P. closest team.

SDT was the first team to earn the first, second, third, fourth, fifth, sixth, seventh and eighth title in the UAAP Cheerdance Competition. SDT was also the only team to achieve a 5 consecutive win (2002-2006) as of the present time.

The dance troupe is composed of UST Students with a passion for dancing. They are auditioned and further trained to polish their talents. The mark of the versatility in Performing Arts is characterized in every Salinggawi performance. Integrated into their program is orientation in the different aspects of entertainment such as scriptwriting, stage production and others.

Choreographer	Year
Rene Hofilena	(1980―1992)
David Jhoy Sasis IV	(1993―1997)
Thea De Guzman	(1997―2000)
Ma. Corazon Medalla	(2000―2002)
Ryan Silva	(2002―2012)
Ramon Pagaduan IV	(2012―2016)
Robert Stephen Biadoma	(2015―Present)(SDT-Dance)
Mark Anthony Chaiwalla	(2017―Present)(SDT-Cheer)

== Logo ==
The Salinggawi logo symbolizes the dance troupe's aim for excellence in theater dances such as classical and modern ballet, jazz, modern dances, authentic folk dances and commercial dances as well. The overlapping character poses implies that the members are composed of men and women who want to exemplify Salinggawi's aim for perfection in dance. The horizontal rays represent the values integrated into their vigorous training. Those values are discipline, gratitude, respect, honesty, loyalty and integrity. These values are embodied by every Salinggawi dancer. It will hone them to become well-trained performers and responsible Thomasian leaders who will enrich and propagate the nation's desirable culture through dance.

== Activities ==
=== Cheerdance ===
The dance troupe, together with UST's official pep squad and drumline – the UST Yellow Jackets, is most popular as the university's official Cheerdance team for the University Athletic Association of the Philippines (UAAP).

SDT Joined the first UAAP Cheerdance Competition in 1994 (then known as the Jollibee Chi-Cheer Kayo Challenge) and became champions for three straight years but opted out of the competition in 1998 and instead joined the Lipton Iced Tea Cheering Competition where they won first place.

In 1999 Salinggawi went back to regain the title however failed against UP Pep Squad which earned its first championship. UP Pep Squad held on to the title for another two years, matching Salinggawi's own record. In 2002, Salinggawi regained the title and held on to it for another four years. UP Pep Squad has been their consistent runner up until 2007 when UP Pep Squad won back the title. The consistent competition among the two groups developed hardcore fans and escalated further the competition among the members of the group. After UST SDT's loss to championship in 2007, the Troupe gradually went downhill placing 3rd, and in 2009, completely losing its place in the Top 3 list. In 2013, the troupe dropped to 7th place, their lowest since the inception of UAAP CDC. In 2014, a podium finish didn't come elusive for the dance troupe as they placed third behind UP.

=== Notable attributes in UAAP Cheerdance routines ===
==== The Zigzag Pyramid ====
They introduced this pyramid in 1995. This pyramid varies each year in number of person involved, height, form, and mounting technique.

==== The Fouette ====
This ballet move was introduced in the Troupe's routine in 2003. The perfect execution, well-synchronized, and creatively choreographed form of fouette made it a distinct feature of UST Salinggawi Dance Troupe in every Cheerdance routine. In the early years of the competition, it was executed during the latter portion of their routine.

==== Huge Banners ====
The squad used huge banners as props in their annual routine. It is usually colored black, gold or white.

- 2001: A large, white banner with a nestle logo covers the dancers for the nestle cheer.
- 2003: 2 long banners used as props in nestle cheer
- 2004: Cut in half to reveal the dancers beneath it
- 2005: Dancers poked out through its holes
- 2006: Displayed a tiger on top of the UST Main Building
- 2007: Two huge flags displayed the logos of Samsung and UAAP and a long banner displayed "University of Santo Tomas" at the end of the routine
- 2008: Two huge flags displayed the last two lines of the UST Hymn: "Ever Your Valiant Legions" and "Imbued with Unending Grace", and banners coming out of a tiger's head displayed the school battle cry, "Viva Santo Tomas"
- 2009: A long banner coming out of a tiger emblem displayed "All Hail The Mighty Tigers".
- 2010: A banner coming out of a magical box completing the slogan "400 Growls of UST".
- "2011": A banner coming out with a surprising big image of UST's Main Building".

==== "Go USTe!" Closing Cheer ====
For the third year in a row since 2006, as well as in 2003 and 2015, they ended their routine with its most popular cheer - "Go USTe!". The cheer was performed with its traditional choreography. As the group exits, the squad points to the Thomasian audience.

==== Campaign Slogans ====
A banner carrying their campaign slogan is displayed by the Thomasian audience and usually represented a bid for a consecutive win.

- 2002: The Real Champions are Back for their bid to regain the title.
- 2003: Back 2 Back for their bid to have a back-to-back title.
- 2004: Balik sa Naka-GAWI-an: Three-Peat for UST for their bid to have another three-peat.
- 2005: Roar 4 More for their bid to have an unprecedented four-peat.
- 2006: Jive for Five for their bid to have an unprecedented five-peat.
- 2007: Tuloy ang Naka-GAWI-an: UST, This SIXTH It! for their bid to snatch a double grand-slam.
- 2009: All Hail The Mighty Tigers for their Ancient Civilizations-inspired routine.
- 2010: 400 Growls of UST for their Year of the Metal Tiger-themed routine and countdown to the university's quadricentennial anniversary.
- 2011: Tigers Have No Predators
- 2012: A New Breed Has Evolved
- 2013: Saling9awi
- 2014: #StoptheHate #NewsBlackout #NewsBrownout

=== Dance Concerts ===
The troupe organizes annual dance concerts usually for Thomasian audiences. Some of their past dance concerts are:

- 1983: "Life and Legend", the program is divided into two parts but unifies into one symbolic shape of a circle wherein both is a beginning and the end. It features the legend of Sarimanok and the struggle of a man in the real world. It was also staged in Philam Life Theater.
- 1984: "Gomburza", a story of the martyred priests who opposed the Spanish Government and was sentenced to death through Garrote. Their death united the nationalistic spirit of the Filipinos. The scenario was interpreted through the artistry of dance movements and steps.
- 1985: "Joseph the Dreamer", a story of the son of Jacob who was sold as a slave by his brothers in Egypt. He soon became the second hand of the pharaoh because of his ability to interpret dreams.
- 1986: "Chorus Line", an excerpt of the musical play West Side Story, which is a story of the performer's plight, his frustrations, his struggles, his dreams to fulfill his ambitions.
- 1987: "OPM (Original Pinoy Music)", a concert that paid tribute to the talented Filipino artists of music.
- 1988: "Alamat ng mga Fiesta", the story of Bundok Bangkay and the different celebration of fiestas and rituals coming from Luzon, Visayas, and Mindanao.
- 1989: "Seasons", Featured the different festivities of the Philippines from the Muslims and the Catholic communities - the way Muslims celebrate New Year and the observance of the Holy Week by the Catholics.
- 1990: "Ensalada", a tribute to Ms. Katy dela Cruz, a Bodabil performer during the prewar period who performed at the Manila Grand Opera House at the Grand Theatre. It also featured life during the Spanish Era, the Nationalistic type of dances and the music that feature the Filipino Art. "ISA", a variety show that was put up by the Performing Arts, participated in by the UST Action Singers, Teatro Tomasino and Salinggawi Dance Troupe among others. This was the first time the performing arts of the University had a joint project for the University Week celebration.
- 1991: "Dance", a concert that featured different styles and kinds of dances.
- 1992: "Alamat ng Manobo", is a concert about the fight between good and evil, the gods and goddesses, the creation of the first man and woman and the beginning of sins. It was this year when the SDT performed in "Oh! Kikay", the life and works of the National Artist for Dance, Francisca Reyes Aquino.
- 1993 - "Metamorphosis", a concert that marked the Silver Anniversary of the Salinggawi Dance Troupe. This concert is basically about changing the style and movement of the dancers. Change is the center for this program that also marked the debut performance of the Salinggawi to sing live. After which, the SDT exhibited costumes and other dance paraphernalia at the UST Central Library to display the progress of the group and the Philippine Folk dances in general.
- 1994: "Culture and the Dreams Beyond", a concert that featured Filipino dances from Igorot to Maria Clara, from Muslim to Rural and the Modern dances to show the artistic and colorful Filipino culture.
- 1995: "Apo Sandawa", Salinggawi stimulated the environmental consciousness in their Bagobo dance drama which was composed by Grupong Pendong with the story adapted from their dance theater. It is a Bagobo drama featuring the lifestyle and traditional rituals and legend of their god, Apo Sandawa. They hosted the 11th annual university-wide dance competition, "Dansensation".
- 1996: "Life, Love and Legend", a trilogy concert. Life pictured the culture and traditions of the Filipino people, while Love tackled the different kinds of affection we rendered to others, and Legend explicitly explained the story of Maria Makiling who fell in love with a mortal being.
- 1997: "Tunog Pinoy, Sayaw at Hiyaw", marked the last year of Mr. Sasis as SDT's choreographer. This concert concentrated on the Filipino's very own dances and music.
- 1998: "Triple X", the 30th dance concert performed by Salinggawi, which showcased their 3 decades of excellence. "Danscene Expo", the 14th annual university-wide dance competition was organized on this same year.
- 1999: "Koladj, Kasaysayan, Kultura, atbp.", the 31st dance concert of the group that showed the history of the Philippines.
- 2000: "SAYAWEH, Rhythm and Move of the New Millennium", is a concert about the evolution of the spiritual conquest of man.
- 2002: Dansurge
- 2003: Idlip, Danscape
- 2004: Sine't Sayaw
- 2005: "Banyuhay", an interpretation of the circle of life, the concert was composed of 21 numbers alternately performed by senior and apprentice members.
- 2006: Deja Vu
- 2007: Almost Home
- 2008: Salinggawi @ 40, a concert marking their 40th Anniversary. They performed different dance genres from ethnic, contemporary and ballet, a testament to the Troupe's versatility. It also included past Salinggawi Alumni to highlight its tradition.
- 2009: Musuo
- 2010: "FOOTNOTES: The stories of the steps we make", the 42nd concert of the group, showing their lives as Salinggawi members through dance.
- 2011: "ETERNO: The legacy continues"
- 2012: "EROS"
- 2013: "Enchant"
- 2014: "Enchant II"
- 2015: "Sibol"
- "2016": "Bakunawa: Ang Mahiwagang Nilalahg ng Lawa ng Sebu"
- "2017": "Sarimanok: Tanglaw sa Panahon ng Sigla"

=== University-wide Competitions ===
The UST Salinggawi Dance Troupe sponsors annual intercollegiate dance and cheering competitions in the University of Santo Tomas:

- Danscene, an Annual Dance Competition (since 1984)
- Street Dance Competition
- Cheermania, an Annual Cheerdance Competition

== See also ==
- UAAP Cheerdance Competition
- UAAP Street Dance Competition
- UST Growling Tigers
- UST Yellow Jackets
- UP–UST rivalry

Awards and achievements
New championship	UAAP Cheerdance Competition Champion; 1994, 1995, 1996	Suspended Title next held by FEU Cheering Squad
Preceded by UP Pep Squad	UAAP Cheerdance Competition Champion; 2002, 2003, 2004, 2005, 2006	Succeeded by UP Pep Squad
