= UP Pep Squad =

- Full name: University of the Philippines Varsity Pep Squad
- Sport: Cheerleading and Cheerdance
- Founded: 1994
- League: UAAP
- Based in: Diliman, Quezon City
- Colors: Maroon and Green
- Championships: 21 (8 UAAP, 9 PNG, 1 NCC, 1 Fil Oil Flying V, 1 Puspusan sa Busan, 1 CAIO Regulation division)
- University: University of the Philippines Diliman

The University of the Philippines Varsity Pep Squad, more popularly known as the UP Pep Squad or simply UP Pep, was formed in 1994. Beginning as a group of 5 UP basketball fans known as the "Hecklers", the squad eventually became the official cheerleading and cheerdance team of the University of the Philippines. The squad performs at the halftime of the basketball games of the UP Fighting Maroons in the University Athletic Association of the Philippines and represents the University in the UAAP Cheerdance Competition, where they were the champions for eight non-consecutive years (1999, 2000, 2001, 2007, 2008, 2010, 2011 and 2012). UP holds the unprecedented most podium finishes at 20 years straight.

The group holds Elevate: Lift One Another Up, an annual dance concert and cheerdance competition in the University. The squad also performs at different university events and functions.

== International competitions ==
Several members of the squad have represented the country in the 2002 Asian Games in Busan, South Korea and 2008 Cheerleading Asia International Open in Tokyo, Japan.

In 2009, an all-UP Pep Squad team represented the Philippines for the 3rd Cheerleading Asia International Open in Tokyo, Japan where they placed third overall in the international category and first in the regulation category.

In 2011, the squad earned the right to represent the country in the 6th Cheerleading World Championships held on November 26–27, 2011 in Hong Kong when they dominated the 1st Philippine National Games by capturing three of the four gold medals at stake. They bagged the third place in the Cheer Mixed category.

In 2013, the team once again represented the Philippines in the 2013 Cheerleading Asia International Open Championships in Tokyo, Japan. They won second place in the Partner Stunts category and third place in the Group Stunts Division. They also represented the Philippines in the 7th Cheerleading World Championships in Bangkok, Thailand last November 23–24, 2013. The squad was able to snatch two podium finishes; third place in Group Stunts category and another third-place finish in the Cheer Mixed category.

In 2015, they once again joined the Cheerleading Asia International Open Championships in Tokyo where they won second place in the Group Stunts Division. Also in the same year, they also represented the country in the 2015 Cheerleading World Championships held in Berlin, Germany which they won one silver (for the Cheer All Female) and two bronze (Small Groups Mixed and Cheer Dance Doubles) medals.

In 2016, they participated in the 8th Cheerleading World Championships held at Berlin, Germany where they won bronze for Partner Stunts (Gerard Aldrin Sison and Mariel Barraza), bronze for Small Group Stunts Mixed (Louie Castro, Nil Costales, Keith Landicho, Fae Pascua, and Juliane Barcenas) and Silver for the All Girl Cheer Division.

== See also ==
- UP–UST rivalry
