= UAAP Season 86 football tournaments =

Philippine college football tournament

UAAP Season 86 Football
- Fueling the Future
Men's Finals	G1	Wins
FEU Tamaraws	0	0
UP Fighting Maroons	1	1
- Arena(s): Rizal Memorial Stadium, Manila
- Finals MVP: Francis Tacardon
- Winning coach: Popoy Clarino
- Semifinalists: Ateneo Blue Eagles; UST Growling Tigers
- TV network(s): One Sports; UAAP Varsity Channel
Women's Finals	G1 (aet)	Wins
FEU Lady Tamaraws	2	1
De La Salle Lady Archers	1	0
- Arena(s): Rizal Memorial Stadium, Manila
- Finals MVP: Dionesa Tolentin
- Winning coach: Let Dimzon
Juniors' Finals	G1	Wins
FEU–D Baby Tamaraws	3	1
UST Tiger Cubs	0	0
- Arena(s): UP Diliman Football Stadium
- Finals MVP: Gian Carlo Lucha
- Winning coach: Albert Besa

The UAAP Season 86 collegiate division football tournament started on February 18, 2024, while the high school division started on January 21, 2024. Both the collegiate and high school divisions were played at the UP Diliman Football Stadium in Quezon City.

== Tournament format ==
The UAAP continued to use the UAAP Final Four format for the Men's Division. A double round-robin elimination round format with a knockout Final Four if no team sweeps the elimination round and a stepladder format if a team sweeps the elimination round. The High School and Women's divisions will also feature a double round-robin elimination round with the top two teams proceeding to the finals.

== Men's tournament ==
=== Elimination round ===
==== Team standings ====
Pos	Team	Pld	W	D	L	GF	GA	GD	Pts	Qualification
1	FEU Tamaraws (H)	12	9	1	2	32	15	+17	28	Qualification for semifinals
2	UP Fighting Maroons	12	9	0	3	27	13	+14	27	Qualification for semifinals
3	UST Golden Booters	12	6	2	4	27	16	+11	20	Qualification for semifinals
4	Ateneo Blue Eagles	12	5	3	4	19	17	+2	18	Qualification for semifinals
5	De La Salle Green Booters	12	4	4	4	18	18	0	16	
6	UE Red Warriors	12	2	1	9	11	30	−19	7	
7	Adamson Soaring Falcons	12	0	3	9	5	30	−25	3	

Source: The UAAP
(H) Hosts

==== Match-up results ====
	Round 1						Round 2					
Team ╲ Game	1	2	3	4	5	6	7	8	9	10	11	12
Adamson Soaring Falcons	Ateneo school colors	UST school colors	UE school colors	La Salle school colors	FEU school colors	UP school colors	UP school colors	La Salle school colors	UE school colors	FEU school colors	Ateneo school colors	UST school colors
Ateneo Blue Eagles	Adamson school colors	UST school colors	UE school colors	FEU school colors	UP school colors	La Salle school colors	UE school colors	FEU school colors	UST school colors	UP school colors	Adamson school colors	La Salle school colors
De La Salle Green Archers	UE school colors	FEU school colors	UP school colors	Adamson school colors	UST school colors	Ateneo school colors	UST school colors	Adamson school colors	UP school colors	UE school colors	FEU school colors	Ateneo school colors
FEU Tamaraws	La Salle school colors	UP school colors	Ateneo school colors	UE school colors	Adamson school colors	UST school colors	Ateneo school colors	Adamson school colors	UST school colors	UP school colors	La Salle school colors	UE school colors
UE Red Warriors	La Salle school colors	Adamson school colors	Ateneo school colors	UST school colors	FEU school colors	UP school colors	Ateneo school colors	UST school colors	Adamson school colors	UP school colors	La Salle school colors	FEU school colors
UP Fighting Maroons	UST school colors	FEU school colors	La Salle school colors	Ateneo school colors	UE school colors	Adamson school colors	Adamson school colors	La Salle school colors	UE school colors	Ateneo school colors	FEU school colors	UST school colors
UST Growling Tigers	UP school colors	Adamson school colors	Ateneo school colors	UE school colors	La Salle school colors	FEU school colors	La Salle school colors	UE school colors	Ateneo school colors	FEU school colors	Adamson school colors	UP school colors

Source: The UAAP
= Win; = Draw; = Loss

==== Results ====
School	AdU	AdMU	DLSU	FEU	UE	UP	UST
Adamson Soaring Falcons	—	1–1	0–0	0–3	0–2	2–3	0–1
Ateneo Blue Eagles	3–0	—	1–1	2–4	4–0	1–0	1–0
De La Salle Green Archers	4–0	2–2	—	3–1	2–1	1–3	1–1
FEU Tamaraws	4–0	2–1	4–0	—	2–0	4–2	3–1
UE Red Warriors	1–1	0–3	2–1	2–3	—	1–2	1–6
UP Fighting Maroons	2–0	4–0	1–2	2–0	2–1	—	2–1
UST Growling Tigers	6–1	3–0	2–1	2–2	4–0	0–4	—

Source: The UAAP
Legend: Blue = left column team win; Yellow = draw; Red = top row team win.

==== Playoffs ====
Semifinals (Knockout)
May 9
1	FEU (a.e.t.)	2
4	Ateneo	1
May 9
2	UP (p)	1 (8)
3	UST	1 (7)

Finals (Knockout)
May 16
1	FEU	0
2	UP	1

==== Semifinals ====
May 9, 2024
16:30

FEU Tamaraws	2–1 (a.e.t.)	Ateneo Blue Eagles
Martini Rey 90+3'; Sherwin Basindanan 109'	Report	Galen Fernandez 28'

Rizal Memorial Stadium, Manila
Referee: John Mike Masinang
May 9, 2024
19:00

UP Fighting Maroons	1–1 (a.e.t.)	UST Golden Booters
Francis Tacardon 45'	Report	TJ Garciano 57'
Penalties
CJ Donato (penalty missed); Francis Tacardon (penalty scored); Charles Lobitaña (penalty scored); Marc Tobias (penalty scored); Orlan Togores (penalty scored); Vince Parpan (penalty scored); Liam Lampayan (penalty scored); Emilio Bongolan (penalty scored); Angelo Pagdanganan (penalty scored)	8–7	(penalty scored) John Selarde; (penalty scored) Chris Valderrama; (penalty scored) Justine Marquez; (penalty missed) Andrew Ramos; (penalty scored) Archie Belluga; (penalty scored) TJ Garciano; (penalty scored) Sam Allegre; (penalty scored) Jarred Regis; (penalty missed) Francis Vercide

Rizal Memorial Stadium, Manila
Referee: Mick John Pineda

=== Finals ===
May 16, 2024
17:00

FEU Tamaraws	0–1	UP Fighting Maroons
	Report	Marc Tobias 50' (pen.)

Rizal Memorial Stadium, Manila
Referee: Clifford Daypuyat

=== Statistics ===
==== Top goalscorers ====
Team eliminated / inactive for this round.

Rank	Player	Team	Round 1						Round 2						SF	F	Total
Rank	Player	Team	M1	M2	M3	M4	M5	M6	M7	M8	M9	M10	M11	M12	SF	F	Total
1	(Philippines) Ramil Bation III	UP Fighting Maroons		1	1		1	2	1			2	1				9
1	(Ghana) Kofi Agyei	Ateneo Blue Eagles	1		3	1		1		1			1	1			9
3	(Ivory Coast) Franck Anoh	De La Salle Green Archers	1	2	1		1	1		1	1						8
3	(Philippines) TJ Garciano	UST Growling Tigers		1	1		1		1	2			3		1		8
5	(Philippines) Karl Absalon	FEU Tamaraws		1	1		1		1	2			1				7
5	(Philippines) Selwyn Mamon	FEU Tamaraws	1	1							2		2	1			7
5	(Philippines) Francis Tacardon	UP Fighting Maroons	1					1	1	1	1			1	1		7
8	(Philippines) Martini Rey	FEU Tamaraws		1	1	1		1						1	1		6
9	(Philippines) Kyler Escobar	UST Growling Tigers				1			1		2	1					5
9	(Philippines) Chris Valderrama	UST Growling Tigers		1		1						1	2				5

==== Hat-tricks ====
Player	School	Result	Against	Date
(Ghana) Kofi Agyei	Ateneo Blue Eagles	4–0^{R1}	UE Red Warriors	29 February 2024
(Philippines) TJ Garciano	UST Growling Tigers	6–1^{R2}	Adamson Soaring Falcons	25 April 2024

Note

^{R1} Round 1
^{R2} Round 2

==== Own goals ====
Rank	Player	School	Against	Own goals
1	(Philippines) Orlan Togores	UP Fighting Maroons	FEU Tamaraws	1
1	(Philippines) Joniel Pamati-an	UE Red Warriors	FEU Tamaraws	1

==== Top assists ====
Rank	Player	School	Assists
1	(Philippines) Chris Valderrama	UST Growling Tigers	7
2	(Philippines) Karl Absalon	FEU Tamaraws	6
3	(Philippines) Sherwin Basindanan	FEU Tamaraws	5
3	(Ghana) Kofi Agyei	Ateneo Blue Eagles	5
5	(Philippines) Ramil Bation III	UP Fighting Maroons	4
5	(Philippines) TJ Garciano	UST Growling Tigers	4
7	(Philippines) Archie Belluga	UST Growling Tigers	3
7	(Philippines) Emilio Bongolan	UP Fighting Maroons	3
7	(Philippines) Jed Bode	UP Fighting Maroons	3
7	(Philippines) Selwyn Mamon	FEU Tamaraws	3
7	(Philippines) Leo Maquiling	Ateneo Blue Eagles	3
7	(Philippines) Nikko Palacio	UE Red Warriors	3
7	(Philippines) Christian Peñalosa	De La Salle Green Archers	3
7	(Philippines) Martini Rey	FEU Tamaraws	3
7	(Philippines) Francis Tacardon	UP Fighting Maroons	3

==== Clean sheets ====
Rank	Player	School	Matches
1	(Philippines) Artuz Cezar	Ateneo Blue Eagles	5
2	(Philippines) Jose Miguel Abada	UST Growling Tigers	4
2	(Philippines) Alfonso Gonzalez	UP Fighting Maroons	4
4	(Philippines) Mon Diansuy	FEU Tamaraws	2
4	(Philippines) Enrico Mangaoang	De La Salle Green Archers	2
4	(Philippines) Jetrick Fabrigas	FEU Tamaraws	2
7	(Philippines) Andrew Nalog	Adamson Soaring Falcons	1
7	(Philippines) Jonniel James Pamati-an	UE Red Warriors	1

==== Multiple Player of the Match ====
Rank	Player	School	Matches	Against
1	(Philippines) Martini Rey	FEU Tamaraws	3	UP, Ateneo, UST
1	(Ghana) Kofi Agyei	Ateneo Blue Eagles	3	Adamson, UE, La Salle
2	(Philippines) Karl Absalon	FEU Tamaraws	2	Ateneo, Adamson
2	(Philippines) Sherwin Basindanan	FEU Tamaraws	2	UE, Ateneo^{SF}
2	(Philippines) Ramil Bation III	UP Fighting Maroons	2	UST, Ateneo
2	(Philippines) Archie Belluga	UST Growling Tigers	2	UE, FEU
2	(Philippines) Alfonso Gonzalez	UP Fighting Maroons	2	FEU, UST^{SF}
2	(Philippines) Leo Maquiling	Ateneo Blue Eagles	2	UE, Adamson
2	(Philippines) Christian Peñalosa	De La Salle Green Archers	2	UE, Adamson
2	(Philippines) John Selarde	UST Growling Tigers	2	Adamson, Ateneo
2	(Philippines) Francis Tacardon	UP Fighting Maroons	2	La Salle, Adamson

=== Awards ===
UAAP Season 86 men's football champions
UP Fighting Maroons
19th title

- Most Valuable Player: Francis Tacardon ( UP Fighting Maroons)
- Rookie of the Year: Ramil Bation III ( UP Fighting Maroons)
- Golden Boot: Kofi Agyei ( Ateneo Blue Eagles) and Ramil Bation III ( UP Fighting Maroons)
- Best Striker: Francis Tacardon ( UP Fighting Maroons)
- Best Midfielder: Marc Tobias ( UP Fighting Maroons)
- Best Defender: Viejay Frigillano ( FEU Tamaraws)
- Best Goalkeeper: Miguel Abada ( UST Growling Tigers)
- Fair Play Award: Ateneo Blue Eagles

== Women's tournament ==
=== Elimination round ===
==== Team standings ====
Pos	Team	Pld	W	D	L	GF	GA	GD	Pts	Qualification
1	FEU Lady Tamaraws	8	8	0	0	30	5	+25	24	Qualification for finals
2	De La Salle Lady Archers	8	6	0	2	25	10	+15	18	Qualification for finals
3	UP Fighting Maroons	8	3	1	4	15	14	+1	10	
4	Ateneo Blue Eagles	8	1	1	6	5	34	−29	4	
5	UST Growling Tigresses	8	1	0	7	5	17	−12	3	

Source: The UAAP

==== Match-up results ====
	Round 1				Round 2			
Team ╲ Game	1	2	3	4	5	6	7	8
Ateneo Blue Eagles	La Salle school colors	FEU school colors	UP school colors	UST school colors	UP school colors	UST school colors	La Salle school colors	FEU school colors
De La Salle Lady Archers	Ateneo school colors	UP school colors	UST school colors	FEU school colors	UST school colors	Ateneo school colors	FEU school colors	UP school colors
FEU Lady Tamaraws	UST school colors	Ateneo school colors	La Salle school colors	UP school colors	UP school colors	UST school colors	La Salle school colors	Ateneo school colors
UP Fighting Maroons	UST school colors	La Salle school colors	Ateneo school colors	FEU school colors	Ateneo school colors	FEU school colors	UST school colors	La Salle school colors
UST Growling Tigresses	UP school colors	FEU school colors	La Salle school colors	Ateneo school colors	La Salle school colors	Ateneo school colors	FEU school colors	UP school colors

Source: The UAAP
= Win; = Draw; = Loss

==== Results ====
School	AdMU	DLSU	FEU	UP	UST
Ateneo Blue Eagles	—	0–5	0–8	2–2	2–0
De La Salle Lady Archers	3–1	—	2–3	3–0	5–1
FEU Lady Tamaraws	7–0	3–1	—	2–0	1–0
UP Fighting Maroons	6–0	3–2	1–4	—	1–0
UST Growling Tigresses	3–0	0–3	1–2	0–3	—

Source: The UAAP
Legend: Blue = left column team win; Yellow = draw; Red = top row team win.

=== Final ===
May 10, 2024
17:00

FEU Lady Tamaraws	2–1 (a.e.t.)	De La Salle Lady Archers
Dionesa Tolentin 45'; Jonela Albiño 112'	Report	Mari Layacan 16'

Rizal Memorial Stadium, Manila
Referee: Jesus Abogado

=== Statistics ===
==== Top goalscorers ====
Team eliminated / inactive for this round.

Rank	Player	Team	Round 1				Round 2				F	Total
Rank	Player	Team	M1	M2	M3	M4	M5	M6	M7	M8	F	Total
1	(Philippines) Dionesa Tolentin	FEU Lady Tamaraws		1	1	1	2	1	1	2	1	10
2	(Philippines) Shai del Campo	De La Salle Lady Archers	2		2		1	1	1	1		8
3	(Philippines) Mari Layacan	De La Salle Lady Archers	2	2						2	1	7
4	(Philippines) Judie Arevalo	FEU Lady Tamaraws		2			1			2		5
4	(Philippines) Sara Tulabing	FEU Lady Tamaraws	2	2								4
4	(Philippines) Aurea Reaso	UP Fighting Maroons			1				2	1		4
4	(Philippines) Anicka Castañeda	De La Salle Lady Archers			1	1		1				3
4	(Philippines) Anya Fuentes	UP Fighting Maroons	1				2					3
4	(Philippines) Kam Mangrobang	UP Fighting Maroons					1	1				3
7	(Philippines) Jonela Albiño	FEU Lady Tamaraws				1					1	2
7	(Philippines) Melai Altiche	FEU Lady Tamaraws					1			1		2
7	(Philippines) Gly Añonuevo	UST Growling Tigresses						1	1			2
7	(Philippines) Chenny Mae Dañoso	De La Salle Lady Archers			1	1		1				2
7	(Philippines) Ma. Angel Egay	FEU Lady Tamaraws	1	1								2
7	(Philippines) Tootchie Eval	Ateneo Blue Eagles				2						2
7	(Philippines) Katrina Magbitang	FEU Lady Tamaraws		1	1							2
7	(Philippines) Drea Montilla	UP Fighting Maroons			1		1					2
7	(Philippines) Angelica Teves	De La Salle Lady Archers				1	1					2

==== Own goals ====
Rank	Player	School	Against	Own goals
1	(Philippines) Nikki Marcos	UST Growling Tigers	FEU Tamaraws	1

==== Top assists ====
Rank	Player	School	Assists
1	(Philippines) Dionesa Tolentin	FEU Lady Tamaraws	7
2	(Philippines) Aurea Reaso	UP Fighting Maroons	5
3	(Philippines) Melai Altiche	FEU Lady Tamaraws	4
3	(Philippines) TJ Isulat	De La Salle Lady Archers	4
3	(Philippines) Shai del Campo	De La Salle Lady Archers	4
3	(Philippines) Angelica Teves	De La Salle Lady Archers	4
6	(Philippines) Angely Alferez	Ateneo Blue Eagles	3
6	(Philippines) Anicka Castañeda	De La Salle Lady Archers	3
6	(Philippines) Sacey Toledo	De La Salle Lady Archers	3
6	(Philippines) Sara Tulabing	FEU Lady Tamaraws	3

==== Clean sheets ====
Rank	Player	School	Matches
1	(Philippines) Yasmin Elauria	FEU Lady Tamaraws	2
1	(Philippines) Alex Gumilao	De La Salle Lady Archers	2
1	(Philippines) Roxy Eduave	UP Fighting Maroons	2
2	(Philippines) Coline Acelo	UP Fighting Maroons	1
2	(Philippines) Liliana Artillo	FEU Lady Tamaraws	1
2	(Philippines) Pao Garcia	UST Growling Tigresses	1
2	(Philippines) Adrielle Lee	Ateneo Blue Eagles	1
2	(Philippines) Jessa Lehayan	FEU Lady Tamaraws	1
2	(Philippines) Jessica Pido	De La Salle Lady Archers	1

==== Multiple Player of the Match ====
Rank	Player	School	Matches	Against
1	(Philippines) Dionesa Tolentin	FEU Lady Tamaraws	4	La Salle, UP, UP, UST
2	(Philippines) Mari Layacan	De La Salle Lady Archers	3	Ateneo, UP, UP
3	(Philippines) Shai del Campo	De La Salle Lady Archers	2	UST, Ateneo
3	(Philippines) Sara Tulabing	FEU Lady Tamaraws	2	Ateneo, Ateneo

=== Awards ===
UAAP Season 86 women's football champions
FEU Lady Tamaraws
12th title, second consecutive title

- Most Valuable Player: Dionesa Tolentin ( FEU Lady Tamaraws)
- Rookie of the Year: Judie Rose Arevalo ( FEU Lady Tamaraws)
- Golden Boot: Dionesa Tolentin ( FEU Lady Tamaraws)
- Best Striker: Dionesa Tolentin ( FEU Lady Tamaraws)
- Best Midfielder: Shai Del Campo ( De La Salle Lady Archers)
- Best Defender: Jennifer Baroin ( UP Fighting Maroons)
- Best Goalkeeper: Frances Coline Acelo ( UP Fighting Maroons)
- Fair Play Award: Ateneo Blue Eagles

== Boys' tournament ==
=== Elimination round ===
==== Team standings ====
Pos	Team	Pld	W	D	L	GF	GA	GD	Pts	Qualification
1	FEU–D Baby Tamaraws	6	4	0	2	12	7	+5	12	Qualification for finals
2	UST Tiger Cubs	6	3	2	1	12	8	+4	11	Qualification for finals
3	Zobel Junior Archers	6	2	1	3	10	11	−1	7	
4	Ateneo Blue Eagles	6	1	1	4	4	12	−8	4	

Source: The UAAP

==== Match-up results ====
	Round 1			Round 2		
Team ╲ Game	1	2	3	4	5	6
Ateneo Blue Eagles	FEU school colors	La Salle school colors	UST school colors	UST school colors	FEU school colors	La Salle school colors
Zobel Junior Archers	UST school colors	Ateneo school colors	FEU school colors	FEU school colors	UST school colors	Ateneo school colors
FEU–D Baby Tamaraws	Ateneo school colors	UST school colors	La Salle school colors	La Salle school colors	Ateneo school colors	UST school colors
UST Tiger Cubs	La Salle school colors	FEU school colors	Ateneo school colors	Ateneo school colors	La Salle school colors	FEU school colors

Source: The UAAP
= Win; = Draw; = Loss

==== Results ====
School	AdMU	DLSZ	FEU	UST
Ateneo Blue Eagles	—	0–3	0–1	1–1
Zobel Junior Archers	0–1	—	3–4	1–4
FEU–D Baby Tamaraws	4–1	0–1	—	0–2
UST Tiger Cubs	3–1	2–2	0–3	—

Source: The UAAP
Legend: Blue = left column team win; Yellow = draw; Red = top row team win.

=== Final ===
February 29, 2024
17:30

FEU–D Baby Tamaraws	3–0	UST Tiger Cubs
Kian Niu 18'; Theo Libarnes 53'; Jacob Keleghan 78'

UP Diliman Football Stadium
Referee: Ricardo Dela Cruz

=== Statistics ===
==== Top goalscorers ====
Team eliminated / inactive for this round.

Rank	Player	Team	Round 1			Round 2			F	Total
Rank	Player	Team	M1	M2	M3	M4	M5	M6	F	Total
1	(Philippines) Theo Libarnes	FEU–D Baby Tamaraws			1		4	1	1	7
2	(Philippines) Julio Yoldi	Zobel Junior Archers	1	1	1		1			4
3	(Philippines) Kent Dela Peña	UST Tiger Cubs	1			1	1			3
3	(Philippines) Bacchus Ekberg	Zobel Junior Archers		1		1	1			3
3	(Philippines) Rodrigo Marinas III	UST Tiger Cubs	1			2				3
3	(Philippines) Kian Niu	FEU–D Baby Tamaraws			2				1	3
7	(Philippines) Javier Bengson	Zobel Junior Archers		1	1					2
7	(Philippines) Kiel Elopre	UST Tiger Cubs	2							2
7	(Philippines) Lance Locsin	UST Tiger Cubs		2						2

==== Hat-tricks ====
Player	School	Result	Against	Date
(Philippines) Theo Libarnes^{4}	FEU–D Baby Tamaraws	4–1 ^{R2}	Ateneo Blue Eagles	17 February 2024

Note

^{R2} Round 2
^{4} Player scored four goals

==== Clean sheets ====
Rank	Player	School	Goals
1	(Philippines) Quintin Lance Sanchez	FEU–D Baby Tamaraws	3
2	(Philippines) Januel Magdangal	Zobel Junior Archers	2
3	(Philippines) Edcel James Lauron	UST Tiger Cubs	1
3	(Philippines) Pio Unlay	Ateneo Blue Eagles	1

=== Awards ===
UAAP Season 86 juniors' football champions
FEU–D Baby Tamaraws
12th title, 12th consecutive title

- Most Valuable Player: Gian Lucha ( FEU–D Baby Tamaraws)
- Rookie of the Year: Jacob Keleghan ( FEU–D Baby Tamaraws)
- Golden Boot: Theo Libarnes ( FEU–D Baby Tamaraws)
- Best Striker: Theo Libarnes ( FEU–D Baby Tamaraws)
- Best Midfielder: Kent Laurenz Dela Peña ( UST Tiger Cubs)
- Best Defender: Bacchus Ekberg ( Zobel Junior Archers)
- Best Goalkeeper: Edsel James Lauron ( UST Tiger Cubs)
- Fair Play Award: Ateneo Blue Eagles

== See also ==
- UAAP Season 86
