= UAAP Season 86 =

Athletics in the Philippines

- "Fueling the Future"
- Host school: University of the East

Overall
- Seniors: University of Santo Tomas
- Juniors: University of Santo Tomas

Collegiate champions
Sport		Men	Women
Basketball		La Salle	UST
Volleyball		NU	NU
Beach volleyball		UST	UST
Badminton		Ateneo	Ateneo
Football		UP	FEU
Baseball		NU	NT
Softball		NT	Adamson
Chess		UST	FEU
Swimming		Ateneo	UP
Table tennis		UST	La Salle
Athletics		NU	La Salle
Taekwondo		NU	UST
Judo		UP	UE
Fencing		UE	UE
Tennis		UST	NU
3x3 basketball		La Salle	UST
- Poomsae: UST (Coed)
- Cheerdance: FEU (Ex - Coed)
- Street dance: UST (Ex - Coed)

High School champions
Sport		Boys	Girls
Basketball		Adamson	NT
Volleyball		NU	Adamson
Beach volleyball		NU	UST
Football		FEU	NT
Chess		FEU	FEU
Swimming		UST	UST
Table tennis		UST	UST
Athletics		Adamson	UST
Taekwondo		NU	NT
Judo		UST	UE
Fencing		UE	UE
3x3 basketball		FEU	NU
- Street dance: UST (Ex - Coed)
- (NT) = No tournament; (DS) = Demonstration Sport; (Ex) = Exhibition;

UAAP Season 86 was the 2023–24 season of the University Athletic Association of the Philippines (UAAP). The season host is the University of the East (UE) under the theme "Fueling the Future". The opening ceremonies was held on September 30, 2023, or right after the 2023 FIBA Basketball World Cup, which was co-hosted by the Philippines. UE also aims to add more events to the calendar, subject to the approval of the UAAP Board.

This was the first season where foreigners are no longer able to win the Most Valuable Player award in tournaments; if a foreigner emerges as the best player statistically, that player shall win the "Best Foreign Student-Athlete" award, while the best performing Filipino wins the Most Valuable Player award.

== Sports calendar ==
This is the calendar of sports events of UAAP Season 86. The list includes the tournament host schools and the venues.

Esports was planned to be included in the calendar, but the discipline was put on hold.

Event (Division)	Event Host	Duration	Venue/s
Opening Ceremony	University of the East	Sep 30, 2023	SM Mall of Asia Arena
Basketball (Collegiate)	University of the East	Sep 30 – Dec 6, 2023	SM Mall of Asia Arena; Smart Araneta Coliseum; Quadricentennial Pavilion; Adamson University Gym
Chess (Collegiate & High School)	Far Eastern University	Oct 14 – Nov 19, 2023	Far Eastern University Institute of Technology Gym
Badminton (Collegiate)	National University	Oct 28 – Nov 12, 2023	Centro Atletico Badminton Center
Table Tennis (Collegiate & High School)	De La Salle University	Nov 9 – 23, 2023	Amoranto Sports Complex
Beach Volleyball (Collegiate)	National University	Nov 17 – 28, 2023	Sands SM by the Bay
Athletics (Collegiate & High School)	Ateneo de Manila University	Nov 22 – 26, 2023	PhilSports Football and Athletics Stadium
Swimming (Collegiate & High School)		Nov 23 – 26, 2023	Rizal Memorial Sports Complex
Basketball (High School)		Nov 21, 2023 – Feb 11, 2024	Amoranto Sports Complex; Araneta Coliseum; Filoil EcoOil Centre; Quadricentennial Pavilion; SM Mall of Asia Arena; St. Vincent Gym
Cheerdance (Coed)	Special Events Committee	Dec 2, 2023	SM Mall of Asia Arena

== Basketball ==
The UAAP basketball championships opened the season on September 30, 2023, at the SM Mall of Asia Arena for the men's tournament, and the next day on the same venue for the women's tournament.

=== Men's tournament ===
==== Elimination round ====
Pos	Team	W	L	PCT	GB	Qualification
1	UP Fighting Maroons	12	2	.857	—	Twice-to-beat in the semifinals
2	De La Salle Green Archers	11	3	.786	1	Twice-to-beat in the semifinals
3	NU Bulldogs	10	4	.714	2	Twice-to-win in the semifinals
4	Ateneo Blue Eagles	7	7	.500 (Note: Fourth seed playoff: Ateneo 70–48 Adamson)	5	Twice-to-win in the semifinals
5	Adamson Soaring Falcons	7	7	.500	5	
6	UE Red Warriors (H)	4	10	.286	8	
7	FEU Tamaraws	3	11	.214	9	
8	UST Growling Tigers	2	12	.143	10	

Source: UAAP on Livestats
Rules for classification: 1) winning percentage; 2) if tied for #2 or #4, one-game playoff; 3) head-to-head record; 4) head-to-head point differential; 5) overall point differential
(H) Hosts

==== Playoffs ====
Semifinals (Top 2 twice-to-beat)
1	UP	57
4	Ateneo	46
2	La Salle	97
3	NU	73

Finals (Best-of-three playoff)
1	UP	97	60	69
2	La Salle	67	82	73

==== Awards ====
- Most Valuable Player: Kevin Quiambao (De La Salle Green Archers)
- Rookie of the Year: Francis Lopez (UP Fighting Maroons)

=== Women's tournament ===
==== Elimination round ====
Pos	Team	W	L	PCT	GB	Qualification
1	NU Lady Bulldogs	13	1	.929	—	Twice-to-beat in the semifinals
2	UST Growling Tigresses	11	3	.786	2	Twice-to-beat in the semifinals
3	UP Fighting Maroons	10	4	.714	3	Twice-to-win in the semifinals
4	Ateneo Blue Eagles	8	6	.571	5	Twice-to-win in the semifinals
5	De La Salle Lady Archers	7	7	.500	6	
6	Adamson Lady Falcons	4	10	.286	9	
7	FEU Lady Tamaraws	3	11	.214	10	
8	UE Lady Warriors (H)	0	14	.000	13	

Source: UAAP on Livestats
Rules for classification: 1) winning percentage; 2) if tied for #2 or #4, one-game playoff; 3) head-to-head record; 4) head-to-head point differential; 5) overall point differential
(H) Hosts

==== Playoffs ====
Semifinals (Top 2 twice-to-beat)
1	NU	58
4	Ateneo	43
2	UST	80	87
3	UP	88	83

Finals (Best-of-three playoff)
1	NU	72	72	69
2	UST	76	70	71

==== Awards ====
- Most Valuable Player: Kacey Dela Rosa (Ateneo Blue Eagles)
- Rookie of the Year: Favour Onoh (UP Fighting Maroons)

=== Boys' tournament ===
==== Elimination round ====
Pos	Team	W	L	PCT	GB	Qualification
1	Adamson Baby Falcons	13	1	.929	—	Twice-to-beat in the semifinals
2	NUNS Bullpups	11	3	.786	2	Twice-to-beat in the semifinals
3	FEU–D Baby Tamaraws	9	5	.643	4	Twice-to-win in the semifinals
4	UST Tiger Cubs	8	6	.571	5	Twice-to-win in the semifinals
5	UE Junior Red Warriors (H)	6	8	.429	7	
6	Zobel Junior Archers	4	10	.286 (Note: Head-to-head record: DLSZ 1–1 Ateneo (DLSZ +9))	9	
7	Ateneo Blue Eagles	4	10	.286	9	
8	UPIS Junior Fighting Maroons	1	13	.071	12	

Source: UAAP on Livestats
Rules for classification: 1) winning percentage; 2) if tied for No. 2 or 4, one-game playoff; 3) head-to-head record; 4) head-to-head point differential; 5) overall point differential
(H) Hosts

==== Playoffs ====
Semifinals (Top 2 twice-to-beat)
1	Adamson	80
4	UST	66
2	NUNS	80
3	FEU–D	69

Finals (Best-of-three playoff)
1	Adamson	77	64	90
2	NUNS	71	67	73

==== Awards ====
- Most Valuable Player: Collins Akowe (NUNS Bullpups)
- Rookie of the Year: Nathan Egea (UPIS Junior Fighting Maroons)

== 3×3 basketball ==
=== Men's tournament ===
==== Elimination round ====
Pos	Team	W	L	PCT	Qualification
1	De La Salle Green Archers	7	0	1.000	Advanced to the semifinals
2	UE Red Warriors (H)	5	2	.714	Advanced to the semifinals
3	UST Growling Tigers	4	3	.571	Advanced to the semifinals
4	NU Bulldogs	4	3	.571	Advanced to the semifinals
5	Adamson Soaring Falcons	4	3	.571	
6	FEU Tamaraws	3	4	.429	
7	UP Fighting Maroons	1	6	.143	
8	Ateneo Blue Eagles	0	7	.000	

Source: UAAP Season 86 3x3
Rules for classification: 1) winning percentage; 2) head-to-head record; 3) head-to-head goal average (quotient); 4) overall quotient
(H) Hosts

==== Playoffs ====
Semifinals
1	La Salle	21
4	NU	20
2	UE	21
3	UST	7

Finals
1	La Salle	17
2	UE	16
Third place
4	NU	21
3	UST	14

===== Match results =====
All times are Philippine Standard Time (UTC+08:00).

Semifinals
Date	Time	Team 1	Score	Team 2
May 5	15:40	De La Salle Green Archers	21–20	NU Bulldogs
May 5	16:00	UE Red Warriors	21–7	UST Growling Tigers

Third place
Date	Time	Team 1	Score	Team 2
May 5	17:00	UST Growling Tigers	14–21	NU Bulldogs

Finals
Date	Time	Team 1	Score	Team 2
May 5	18:40	De La Salle Green Archers	17–16	UE Red Warriors

=== Women's tournament ===
==== Elimination round ====
Pos	Team	W	L	PCT	Qualification
1	NU Lady Bulldogs	6	1	.857	Advanced to the semifinals
2	UST Growling Tigresses	6	1	.857	Advanced to the semifinals
3	Adamson Lady Falcons	4	3	.571	Advanced to the semifinals
4	De La Salle Lady Archers	4	3	.571	Advanced to the semifinals
5	Ateneo Blue Eagles	3	4	.429	
6	UE Lady Warriors (H)	2	5	.286	
7	UP Fighting Maroons	2	5	.286	
8	FEU Lady Tamaraws	1	6	.143	

Source: UAAP Season 86 3x3
Rules for classification: 1) winning percentage; 2) head-to-head record; 3) head-to-head goal average (quotient); 4) overall quotient
(H) Hosts

==== Playoffs ====
Semifinals
women

Finals
Third place

===== Match results =====
All times are Philippine Standard Time (UTC+08:00).

Semifinals
Date	Time	Team 1	Score	Team 2
May 5	15:00	NU Lady Bulldogs	20–11	De La Salle Lady Archers
May 5	15:20	UST Growling Tigresses	20–16	Adamson Lady Falcons

Third place
Date	Time	Team 1	Score	Team 2
May 5	17:00	Adamson Lady Falcons	16–18	De La Salle Lady Archers

Finals
Date	Time	Team 1	Score	Team 2
May 5	18:40	NU Lady Bulldogs	18–21	UST Growling Tigresses

=== Boys' tournament ===
==== Elimination round ====
Pos	Team	W	L	PCT	Qualification
1	FEU–D Baby Tamaraws	7	0	1.000	Advanced to the semifinals
2	UST Tiger Cubs	6	1	.857	Advanced to the semifinals
3	Adamson Baby Falcons	5	2	.714	Advanced to the semifinals
4	Zobel Junior Archers	3	4	.429	Advanced to the semifinals
5	UPIS Junior Fighting Maroons	2	5	.286	
6	NUNS Bullpups	2	5	.286	
7	UE Junior Red Warriors (H)	2	5	.286	
8	Ateneo Blue Eaglets	1	6	.143	

Source: UAAP Season 86 3x3
Rules for classification: 1) winning percentage; 2) head-to-head record; 3) head-to-head goal average (quotient); 4) overall quotient
(H) Hosts

==== Playoffs ====
Semifinals
1	FEU–D	21
4	La Salle	12
2	UST	18
3	Adamson	17

Finals
1	FEU–D	17
2	UST	15
Third place
4	La Salle	13
3	Adamson	15

===== Match results =====
All times are Philippine Standard Time (UTC+08:00).

Semifinals
Date	Time	Team 1	Score	Team 2
May 5	14:20	FEU–D Baby Tamaraws	21–12	Zobel Junior Archers
May 5	14:40	UST Tiger Cubs	18–17	Adamson Baby Falcons

Third place
Date	Time	Team 1	Score	Team 2
May 5	16:40	Adamson Baby Falcons	15–13	Zobel Junior Archers

Finals
Date	Time	Team 1	Score	Team 2
May 5	18:00	FEU–D Baby Tamaraws	17–15	UST Tiger Cubs

=== Girls' tournament ===
==== Elimination round ====
Pos	Team	W	L	PCT	Qualification
1	UST Junior Tigresses	4	0	1.000	Advanced to the finals
2	NUNS Lady Bullpups	3	1	.750	Advanced to the finals
3	Adamson Lady Baby Falcons	2	2	.500	Advanced to the third place match
4	Zobel Junior Lady Archers	1	3	.250	Advanced to the third place match
5	Ateneo Lady Eaglets	0	4	.000	

Source: UAAP Season 86 3x3
Rules for classification: 1) winning percentage; 2) head-to-head record; 3) head-to-head goal average (quotient); 4) overall quotient

==== Playoffs ====
===== Match results =====
All times are Philippine Standard Time (UTC+08:00).

Third place
Date	Time	Team 1	Score	Team 2
May 5	16:20	Adamson Lady Baby Falcons	10–18	Zobel Junior Lady Archers

Finals
Date	Time	Team 1	Score	Team 2
May 5	17:40	UST Junior Tigresses	14–21	NUNS Lady Bullpups

=== Medalists ===
Event	Gold	Silver	Bronze
Men's tournament	La Salle	UE	UST
Women's tournament	UST	NU	La Salle
Boys' tournament	FEU	UST	Adamson
Girls' tournament	NU	UST	La Salle

== Volleyball ==
The UAAP volleyball championships for the high school division began on November 4, 2023. The Adamson University gym is tournament venue.

=== Men's tournament ===
==== Elimination round ====
Pos	Team	Pld	W	L	Pts	SW	SL	SR	SPW	SPL	SPR	Qualification
1	FEU Tamaraws	14	12	2	34	38	15	2.533	1228	1113	1.103	Twice-to-beat in the semifinals
2	NU Bulldogs	14	11 (Note: Second-seed playoff: NU 3–2 La Salle)	3	33	36	13	2.769	1181	1024	1.153	Twice-to-beat in the semifinals
3	De La Salle Green Spikers	14	11	3	33	37	15	2.467	1244	1104	1.127	Twice-to-win in the semifinals
4	UST Golden Spikers	14	8	6	25	33	23	1.435	1291	1218	1.060	Twice-to-win in the semifinals
5	Ateneo Blue Eagles	14	7	7	20	26	29	0.897	1210	1202	1.007	
6	Adamson Soaring Falcons	14	4	10	13	17	30	0.567	1040	1119	0.929	
7	UP Fighting Maroons	14	2	12	7	10	39	0.256	979	1166	0.840	
8	UE Red Warriors (H)	14	1	13	3	8	41	0.195	962	1189	0.809	

Source: UAAP Volleyball on Livestats
Rules for classification: 1) win–loss record; 2) if tied for No. 2 or 4, one-game playoff; 3) match points; 4) sets ratio; 5) points ratio; 6) head-to-head record
(H) Host

==== Playoffs ====
Semifinals (Nos. 1 & 2 have twice-to-beat advantage)
1	FEU	0	1
4	UST	3	3
2	NU	3
3	La Salle	1

Finals (Best-of-three series)
4	UST	0	1
2	NU	3	3

==== Awards ====
- Most Valuable Player: Joshua Ybañez (UST Golden Spikers)
- Rookie of the Year: Jade Alex Disquitado (NU Bulldogs)

=== Women's tournament ===
==== Elimination round ====
Pos	Team	Pld	W	L	Pts	SW	SL	SR	SPW	SPL	SPR	Qualification
1	NU Lady Bulldogs	14	12	2	36	38	12	3.167	1192	965	1.235	Twice-to-beat in the semifinals
2	UST Golden Tigresses	14	12	2	34	39	17	2.294	1293	1148	1.126	Twice-to-beat in the semifinals
3	De La Salle Lady Spikers	14	11	3	32	37	15	2.467	1193	1023	1.166	Twice-to-win in the semifinals
4	FEU Lady Tamaraws	14	9	5	26	30	23	1.304	1190	1131	1.052	Twice-to-win in the semifinals
5	Ateneo Blue Eagles	14	5	9	16	22	31	0.710	1109	1182	0.938	
6	UE Lady Red Warriors (H)	14	3	11	11	18	36	0.500	1091	1268	0.860	
7	Adamson Lady Falcons	14	3	11	8	14	36	0.389	1037	1202	0.863	
8	UP Fighting Maroons	14	1	13	5	12	40	0.300	1078	1264	0.853	

Source: UAAP Volleyball on Livestats
Rules for classification: 1) win–loss record; 2) if tied for No. 2 or 4, one-game playoff; 3) match points; 4) sets ratio; 5) points ratio; 6) head-to-head record
(H) Host

==== Playoffs ====
Semifinals (Nos. 1 & 2 have twice-to-beat advantage)
1	NU	0	3
4	FEU	3	0
2	UST	3
3	La Salle	2

Finals (Best-of-three series)
1	NU	3	3
2	UST	0	1

==== Awards ====
- Most Valuable Player: Mhicaela Belen (NU Lady Bulldogs)
- Rookie of the Year: Angeline Poyos (UST Golden Tigresses)

=== Boys' tournament ===
==== Elimination round ====
Pos	Team	Pld	W	L	Pts	SW	SL	SR	SPW	SPL	SPR	Qualification
1	NUNS Bullpups	14	12	2	36	38	9	4.222	347	236	1.470	Twice-to-beat in the semifinals
2	UE Junior Red Warriors	14	12	2	35	36	10	3.600	332	221	1.502	Twice-to-beat in the semifinals
3	FEU–D Baby Tamaraws	14	11	3	33	35	11	3.182	294	221	1.330	Twice-to-win in the semifinals
4	UST Tiger Cubs	14	8	6	25	30	19	1.579	335	330	1.015	Twice-to-win in the semifinals
5	Adamson Baby Falcons (H)	14	7	7	21	25	23	1.087	318	243	1.309	
6	Zobel Junior Archers	14	4	10	11	12	33	0.364	145	275	0.527	
7	UPIS Junior Fighting Maroons	14	2	12	7	9	36	0.250	187	283	0.661	
8	Ateneo Blue Eagles	14	0	14	0	0	42	0.000	148	300	0.493	

Source: UAAP Volleyball on Twitter
Rules for classification: 1) number of wins; 2) if tied for No. 2 or 4, one-game playoff; 3) match points; 4) sets ratio; 5) points ratio; 6) head-to-head record
(H) Host

==== Playoffs ====
Semifinals (Nos. 1 & 2 have twice-to-beat advantage)
1	NUNS	3
4	UST	1
2	UE	3
3	FEU–D	1

Final (Best-of-three series)
1	NUNS	3	2	3
2	UE	1	3	1

==== Awards ====
- Most Valuable Player: Joncriz Ayco (UST Tiger Cubs)

=== Girls' tournament ===
==== Elimination round ====
Pos	Team	Pld	W	L	Pts	SW	SL	SR	SPW	SPL	SPR	Qualification
1	Adamson Lady Baby Falcons (H)	12	12	0	34	36	4	9.000	300	238	1.261	Advance to the finals
2	UST Junior Tigresses	12	8 (Note: Second–seed playoff: UST 3–2 NU)	4	24	27	14	1.929	205	168	1.220	Proceed to stepladder round 2
3	NUNS Lady Bullpups	12	8	4	26	30	14	2.143	310	234	1.325	Proceed to stepladder round 1
4	FEU–D Lady Baby Tamaraws	12	8	4	24	26	16	1.625	223	208	1.072	Proceed to stepladder round 1
5	Zobel Junior Lady Archers	12	4	8	12	13	26	0.500	165	195	0.846	
6	Ateneo Blue Eagles	12	2	10	6	7	31	0.226	262	314	0.834	
7	UPIS Junior Lady Maroons	12	0	12	0	2	36	0.056	142	250	0.568	

Source: UAAP Volleyball on Twitter
Rules for classification: 1) number of wins; 2) if tied for No. 2 or 4, one-game playoff; 3) match points; 4) sets ratio; 5) points ratio; 6) head-to-head record
(H) Host

==== Playoffs ====
Stepladder round 1 (Knockout)
3	NUNS	3
4	FEU–D	0

Stepladder round 2 (Knockout)
2	UST	1
3	NUNS	3

Finals (Best-of-three series)
1	Adamson	3	3
3	NUNS	0	0

==== Awards ====
- Most Valuable Player: Shaina Nitura (Adamson Lady Baby Falcons)

== Football ==
The UAAP football championships for the high school boys' division began on January 21, 2024 while the senior men's division started on February 18, 2024. The UP Diliman Football Stadium is the venue for both juniors and seniors division.

=== Men's tournament ===
==== Elimination round ====
Pos	Team	Pld	W	D	L	GF	GA	GD	Pts	Qualification
1	FEU Tamaraws (H)	12	9	1	2	32	15	+17	28	Qualification for semifinals
2	UP Fighting Maroons	12	9	0	3	27	13	+14	27	Qualification for semifinals
3	UST Golden Booters	12	6	2	4	27	16	+11	20	Qualification for semifinals
4	Ateneo Blue Eagles	12	5	3	4	19	17	+2	18	Qualification for semifinals
5	De La Salle Green Booters	12	4	4	4	18	18	0	16	
6	UE Red Warriors	12	2	1	9	11	30	−19	7	
7	Adamson Soaring Falcons	12	0	3	9	5	30	−25	3	

Source: The UAAP
(H) Hosts

==== Playoffs ====
Semifinals (Knockout)
May 9
1	FEU (a.e.t.)	2
4	Ateneo	1
May 9
2	UP (p)	1 (8)
3	UST	1 (7)

Finals (Knockout)
May 16
1	FEU	0
2	UP	1

==== Awards ====
- Most Valuable Player: Francis Tacardon ( UP Fighting Maroons)
- Rookie of the Year: Ramil Bation III ( UP Fighting Maroons)

=== Women's tournament ===
==== Elimination round ====
Pos	Team	Pld	W	D	L	GF	GA	GD	Pts	Qualification
1	FEU Lady Tamaraws	8	8	0	0	30	5	+25	24	Qualification for finals
2	De La Salle Lady Archers	8	6	0	2	25	10	+15	18	Qualification for finals
3	UP Fighting Maroons	8	3	1	4	15	14	+1	10	
4	Ateneo Blue Eagles	8	1	1	6	5	34	−29	4	
5	UST Growling Tigresses	8	1	0	7	5	17	−12	3	

Source: The UAAP

==== Finals ====
May 10, 2024
17:00

FEU Lady Tamaraws	2–1 (a.e.t.)	De La Salle Lady Archers
Dionesa Tolentin 45'; Jonela Albiño 112'	Report	Mari Layacan 16'

Rizal Memorial Stadium, Manila
Referee: Jesus Abogado

==== Awards ====
- Most Valuable Player: Dionesa Tolentin ( FEU Lady Tamaraws)
- Rookie of the Year: Judie Rose Arevalo ( FEU Lady Tamaraws)

=== Boys' tournament ===
==== Elimination round ====
Pos	Team	Pld	W	D	L	GF	GA	GD	Pts	Qualification
1	FEU–D Baby Tamaraws	6	4	0	2	12	7	+5	12	Qualification for finals
2	UST Tiger Cubs	6	3	2	1	12	8	+4	11	Qualification for finals
3	Zobel Junior Archers	6	2	1	3	10	11	−1	7	
4	Ateneo Blue Eagles	6	1	1	4	4	12	−8	4	

Source: The UAAP

==== Finals ====
February 29, 2024
17:30

FEU–D Baby Tamaraws	3–0	UST Tiger Cubs
Kian Niu 18'; Theo Libarnes 53'; Jacob Keleghan 78'

UP Diliman Football Stadium
Referee: Ricardo Dela Cruz

==== Awards ====
- Most Valuable Player: Gian Lucha ( FEU–D Baby Tamaraws)
- Rookie of the Year: Jacob Keleghan ( FEU–D Baby Tamaraws)

== Baseball ==
=== Men's tournament ===
==== Elimination round ====
Pos	Team	Pld	W	L	PCT	GB	Qualification
1	De La Salle Green Batters	10	7	3	.700 (Note: Head-to-head record: DLSU 1–1 NU (DLSU RA:8))	—	Twice-to-beat in the semifinals
2	NU Bulldogs	10	7	3	.700	—	Twice-to-beat in the semifinals
3	Ateneo Blue Eagles	10	5	5	.500	2	Twice-to-win in the semifinals
4	UST Golden Sox	10	4	6	.400 (Note: Fourth seed playoff: UST 15–11 UP)	3	Twice-to-win in the semifinals
5	UP Fighting Maroons	10	4	6	.400	3	
6	Adamson Soaring Falcons	10	3	7	.300	4	

Rules for classification: 1) winning percentage; 2) if tied for #2 or #4, one-game playoff; 3) head-to-head record; 4) head-to-head runs against; 5) overall run differential

===== Fourth seed playoff =====
UP and UST finished the elimination round tied for fourth. This was a one-game playoff to determine the #4 seed.

April 6, 2024 8:00 AM at UP Diliman Baseball/Softball Field
Team	1	2	3	4	5	6	7	8	9	R	H	E
UST Golden Sox	5	3	0	5	0	1	0	0	1	15	17	5
UP Fighting Maroons	0	0	0	4	5	1	1	0	0	11	11	3

==== Playoffs ====
Semifinals (Nos. 1 & 2 have twice-to-beat advantage)
1	La Salle	6
4	UST	4
2	NU	9
3	Ateneo	5

Final (Best-of-three series)
1	La Salle	4	2
2	NU	8	4

== Softball ==
=== Women's tournament ===
==== Elimination round ====
Pos	Team	Pld	W	L	PCT	GB	Qualification
1	Adamson Lady Falcons	8	8	0	1.000	—	Advance to the Finals
2	UP Fighting Maroons	8	5	3	.625 (Note: Second-seed playoff: UP 3–2 UST)	3	Advance to the Finals
3	UST Tiger Softbelles	8	5	3	.625	3	
4	De La Salle Lady Batters	8	1	7	.125 (Note: Head-to-head record: La Salle 1–1 Ateneo, La Salle (+4))	7	
5	Ateneo Blue Eagles	8	1	7	.125	7	

Rules for classification: 1) winning percentage; 2) if tied for #2 or #4, one-game playoff; 3) head-to-head record; 4) head-to-head runs against; 5) overall run differential

==== Playoffs ====
Playoff (One-game playoff)
2	UP	3
3	UST	2

Finals (Best-of-three series)
1	Adamson	2	15	4*
2	UP	3*	2	3

*Extra innings

===== Playoff =====
April 6, 2024 4:00 PM at UP Diliman Baseball/Softball Field
Team	1	2	3	4	5	6	7	R	H	E
UST Tiger Softbelles	0	1	0	0	0	0	1	2	6	3
UP Fighting Maroons	1	0	1	0	0	0	1	3	8	0

===== Finals =====
April 10, 2024 4:00 PM at UP Diliman Baseball/Softball Field
Team	1	2	3	4	5	6	7	8	R	H	E
UP Fighting Maroons	0	0	0	0	0	0	1	2	3	8	2
Adamson Lady Falcons	0	1	0	0	0	0	0	1	2	4	1

April 13, 2024 4:00 PM at UP Diliman Baseball/Softball Field
Team	1	2	3	4	5	6	7	R	H	E
Adamson Lady Falcons	4	0	2	1	0	1	7	15	20	1
UP Fighting Maroons	0	0	0	0	1	1	0	2	4	4

April 17, 2024 4:00 PM at UP Diliman Baseball/Softball Field
Team	1	2	3	4	5	6	7	8	R	H	E
UP Fighting Maroons	0	0	0	2	0	0	0	1	3	2	3
Adamson Lady Falcons	0	0	0	0	2	0	0	2	4	5	3

== Badminton ==
The UAAP badminton championships began on October 28, 2023. The tournament venue is the Centro Atletico Badminton Center in Quezon City. National University is the tournament host.

=== Men's tournament ===
==== Elimination round ====
===== Team standings =====
Pos	Team	Pld	W	L	PCT	GB	Qualification
1	Ateneo Blue Eagles	5	4	1	.800	—	Advance to the semifinals
2	UP Fighting Maroons	5	4	1	.800	—	Advance to the semifinals
3	NU Bulldogs (H)	5	4	1	.800	—	Advance to the semifinals
4	UST Male Golden Shuttlers	5	2	3	.400	2	Advance to the semifinals
5	De La Salle Green Shuttlers	5	1	4	.200	3	
6	Adamson Soaring Falcons	5	0	5	.000	4	

Rules for classification: 1) winning percentage; 2) if tied for #2 or #4, one-game playoff; 3) head-to-head record; 4) head-to-head point differential; 5) overall point differential
(H) Hosts

===== Match-up results =====
Team ╲ Game	1	2	3	4	5
Adamson	NU school colors	UST school colors	Ateneo school colors	La Salle school colors	UP school colors
Ateneo	La Salle school colors	UP school colors	Adamson school colors	UST school colors	NU school colors
La Salle	Ateneo school colors	NU school colors	UP school colors	Adamson school colors	UST school colors
NU	Adamson school colors	La Salle school colors	UST school colors	UP school colors	Ateneo school colors
UP	UST school colors	Ateneo school colors	La Salle school colors	NU school colors	Adamson school colors
UST	UP school colors	Adamson school colors	NU school colors	Ateneo school colors	La Salle school colors

= Win; = Loss

==== Playoffs ====
Semifinals
1	Ateneo	3
4	UST	0
2	UP	2
3	NU	3

Finals
1	Ateneo	3
3	NU	2
Third place
4	UST	0
2	UP	3

==== Awards ====
- Most Valuable Player: Arthur Samuel Salvado Jr. (Ateneo Blue Eagles) and Lyrden Laborte (Ateneo Blue Eagles)
- Rookie of the Year: Lance Gabriel Vargas (Ateneo Blue Eagles)

=== Women's tournament ===
==== Elimination round ====
===== Team standings =====
Pos	Team	Pld	W	L	PCT	GB	Qualification
1	Ateneo Blue Eagles	5	5	0	1.000	—	Advance to the semifinals
2	NU Lady Bulldogs (H)	5	4	1	.800	1	Advance to the semifinals
3	UP Fighting Maroons	5	3	2	.600	2	Advance to the semifinals
4	UST Female Golden Shuttlers	5	2	3	.400	3	Advance to the semifinals
5	De La Salle Lady Shuttlers	5	1	4	.200	4	
6	Adamson Lady Falcons	5	0	5	.000	5	

Rules for classification: 1) winning percentage; 2) if tied for #2 or #4, one-game playoff; 3) head-to-head record; 4) head-to-head point differential; 5) overall point differential
(H) Hosts

===== Match-up results =====
Team ╲ Game	1	2	3	4	5
Adamson	Ateneo school colors	La Salle school colors	UP school colors	UST school colors	NU school colors
Ateneo	Adamson school colors	UST school colors	La Salle school colors	NU school colors	UP school colors
La Salle	NU school colors	Adamson school colors	Ateneo school colors	UP school colors	UST school colors
NU	La Salle school colors	UP school colors	UST school colors	Ateneo school colors	Adamson school colors
UP	UST school colors	NU school colors	Adamson school colors	La Salle school colors	Ateneo school colors
UST	UP school colors	Ateneo school colors	NU school colors	Adamson school colors	La Salle school colors

= Win; = Loss

==== Playoffs ====
Semifinals
1	Ateneo	3
4	UST	1
2	NU	0
3	UP	3

Finals
1	Ateneo	3
3	UP	1
Third place
4	UST	1
2	NU	3

==== Awards ====
- Most Valuable Player: Jochelle Alvarez (Ateneo Lady Eagles) and Mikaela Joy De Guzman (Ateneo Lady Eagles)
- Rookie of the Year: Patricia De Leon (UST Growling Tigresses)

== Beach volleyball ==
The UAAP beach volleyball championships will be held on November 17–28, 2023. The Sands SM by the Bay in Pasay is the venue of the tournament.

=== Men's tournament ===
==== Elimination round ====
===== Team standings =====
Pos	Team	Pld	W	L	Pts	SW	SL	SR	SPW	SPL	SPR	Qualification
1	NU Bulldogs (H)	7	7	0	14	14	1	14.000	306	199	1.538	Twice-to-beat in the semifinals
2	UST Tiger Sands	7	6	1	13	12	2	6.000	289	182	1.588	Twice-to-beat in the semifinals
3	Ateneo Blue Eagles	7	5	2	12	11	5	2.200	252	254	0.992	Twice-to-win in the semifinals
4	FEU Tamaraws	7	4	3	11	8	6	1.333	260	234	1.111	Twice-to-win in the semifinals
5	De La Salle Green Spikers	7	3	4	10	6	8	0.750	219	260	0.842	
6	UP Fighting Maroons	7	2	5	9	5	10	0.500	241	290	0.831	
7	Adamson Soaring Falcons	7	1	6	8	2	12	0.167	198	288	0.688	
8	UE Red Warriors	7	0	7	7	0	12	0.000	186	327	0.569	

Source: @uaap_official (November 25, 2023). "#UAAPSeason86 Beach Volleyball Tournament Results, November 25, at the Sands, SM By The Bay (MOA Beach Volleyball Sand Court)" (Tweet) – via X (formerly Twitter).
Rules for classification: 1) winning percentage; 2) if tied for #2 or #4, one-game playoff; 3) head-to-head record; 4) match points; 5) sets ratio; 6) points ratio
(H) Host

===== Match-up results =====
Team ╲ Game	1	2	3	4	5	6	7
Adamson	UP school colors	Ateneo school colors	La Salle school colors	NU school colors	UST school colors	FEU school colors	UE school colors
Ateneo	UST school colors	Adamson school colors	NU school colors	UE school colors	UP school colors	La Salle school colors	FEU school colors
La Salle	UE school colors	NU school colors	Adamson school colors	UST school colors	FEU school colors	Ateneo school colors	UP school colors
FEU	NU school colors	UST school colors	UE school colors	UP school colors	La Salle school colors	Adamson school colors	Ateneo school colors
NU	FEU school colors	La Salle school colors	Ateneo school colors	Adamson school colors	UE school colors	UP school colors	UST school colors
UE	La Salle school colors	UP school colors	FEU school colors	Ateneo school colors	NU school colors	UST school colors	Adamson school colors
UP	Adamson school colors	UST school colors	UE school colors	FEU school colors	Ateneo school colors	NU school colors	La Salle school colors
UST	Ateneo school colors	UP school colors	FEU school colors	La Salle school colors	Adamson school colors	UE school colors	NU school colors

Source: @uaap_official (November 25, 2023). "#UAAPSeason86 Beach Volleyball Tournament Results, November 25, at the Sands, SM By The Bay (MOA Beach Volleyball Sand Court)" (Tweet) – via X (formerly Twitter).
= Win; = Loss

===== Game results =====
Results on top and to the right of the solid cells are for first-round games; those to the bottom and to the left of it are second-round games.

Teams	AdU	ADMU	DLSU	FEU	NU	UE	UP	UST
Adamson Soaring Falcons		0–2	0–2	0–2	0–2	2–0	0–2	0–2
Ateneo Blue Eagles			2–0	2–0	1–2	2–0	2–1	0–2
De La Salle Green Spikers				0–2	0–2	2–0	2–0	0–2
FEU Tamaraws					0–2	0–2	2–0	0–2
NU Bulldogs						2–0	2–0	2–0
UE Red Warriors							2–0	0–2
UP Fighting Maroons								0–2
UST Tiger Sands								

Source: @uaap_official (November 25, 2023). "#UAAPSeason86 Beach Volleyball Tournament Results, November 25, at the Sands, SM By The Bay (MOA Beach Volleyball Sand Court)" (Tweet) – via X (formerly Twitter).
Legend: Blue = left column team win; Red = top row team win.

=== Playoffs ===
Semifinals (Nos. 1 & 2 have twice-to-beat advantage)
RD1-text2

Finals (Knockout)
3rd place (Knockout)

==== Awards ====
- Most Valuable Player: Alche Gupiteo (UST Growling Tigers)
- Rookie of the Year:

=== Women's tournament ===
==== Elimination round ====
===== Team standings =====
Pos	Team	Pld	W	L	Pts	SW	SL	SR	SPW	SPL	SPR	Qualification
1	UST Lady Spikers	7	6 (Note: Rally point ratio: UST (1.065), NU (1.055), FEU (0.898))	1	13	13	3	4.333	320	226	1.416	Twice-to-beat in the semifinals
2	NU Lady Bulldogs (H)	7	6	1	13	12	2	6.000	287	188	1.527	Twice-to-beat in the semifinals
3	FEU Lady Tamaraws	7	6	1	13	12	4	3.000	314	244	1.287	Twice-to-win in the semifinals
4	UP Fighting Maroons	7	4	3	11	9	6	1.500	264	231	1.143	Twice-to-win in the semifinals
5	Ateneo Blue Eagles	7	3	4	10	5	10	0.500	294	284	1.035	
6	Adamson Lady Falcons	7	1	6	8	4	13	0.308	201	309	0.650	
7	UE Lady Warriors	7	1	6	8	4	14	0.286	217	300	0.723	
8	De La Salle Lady Spikers	7	1	6	8	2	13	0.154	185	301	0.615	

Source: @uaap_official (November 25, 2023). "#UAAPSeason86 Beach Volleyball Tournament Results, November 25, at the Sands, SM By The Bay (MOA Beach Volleyball Sand Court)" (Tweet) – via X (formerly Twitter).
Rules for classification: 1) winning percentage; 2) if tied for #2 or #4, one-game playoff; 3) head-to-head record; 4) match points; 5) sets ratio; 6) points ratio
(H) Host

===== Match-up results =====
Team ╲ Game	1	2	3	4	5	6	7
Adamson	UE school colors	NU school colors	Ateneo school colors	UST school colors	La Salle school colors	UP school colors	FEU school colors
Ateneo	FEU school colors	UP school colors	Adamson school colors	NU school colors	UST school colors	La Salle school colors	UE school colors
La Salle	NU school colors	UST school colors	UE school colors	FEU school colors	Adamson school colors	Ateneo school colors	UP school colors
FEU	Ateneo school colors	UST school colors	UE school colors	La Salle school colors	UP school colors	NU school colors	Adamson school colors
NU	La Salle school colors	Adamson school colors	UP school colors	Ateneo school colors	UE school colors	FEU school colors	UST school colors
UE	Adamson school colors	FEU school colors	La Salle school colors	UP school colors	NU school colors	UST school colors	Ateneo school colors
UP	UST school colors	Ateneo school colors	NU school colors	UE school colors	FEU school colors	Adamson school colors	La Salle school colors
UST	UP school colors	FEU school colors	La Salle school colors	Adamson school colors	Ateneo school colors	UE school colors	NU school colors

Source: @uaap_official (November 25, 2023). "#UAAPSeason86 Beach Volleyball Tournament Results, November 25, at the Sands, SM By The Bay (MOA Beach Volleyball Sand Court)" (Tweet) – via X (formerly Twitter).
= Win; = Loss

===== Game results =====
Results on top and to the right of the solid cells are for first-round games; those to the bottom and to the left of it are second-round games.

Teams	AdU	ADMU	DLSU	FEU	NU	UE	UP	UST
Adamson Lady Falcons		1–2	1–2	0–2	0–2	2–1	0–2	0–2
Ateneo Blue Eagles			2–0	0–2	0–2	2–1	0–2	1–2
De La Salle Lady Spikers				0–2	0–2	0–2	0–2	0–2
FEU Lady Tamaraws					0–2	2–0	2–1	2–1
NU Lady Bulldogs						2–0	2–0	0–2
UE Lady Warriors							0–2	0–2
UP Fighting Maroons								0–2
UST Lady Spikers								

Source: @uaap_official (November 25, 2023). "#UAAPSeason86 Beach Volleyball Tournament Results, November 25, at the Sands, SM By The Bay (MOA Beach Volleyball Sand Court)" (Tweet) – via X (formerly Twitter).
Legend: Blue = left column team win; Red = top row team win.

=== Playoffs ===
Semifinals (Nos. 1 & 2 have twice-to-beat advantage)
RD1-text2

Finals (Knockout)
3rd place (Knockout)

==== Awards ====
- Most Valuable Player: Gen Eslapor (UST Growling Tigresses)
- Rookie of the Year: Sofia Pagara (UST Growling Tigresses)

== Chess ==
The UAAP chess championships began on October 14, 2023. The Far Eastern University Institute of Technology Gym in Manila is the venue of the tournament.

=== Men's tournament ===
==== Elimination round ====
===== Team standings =====
Pos	Team	Match Points
1	UST Male Woodpushers	14.0
2	Ateneo Blue Eagles	12.0
3	UP Fighting Maroons	9.0
4	FEU Tamaraws	7.0
5	De La Salle Green Archers	5.0
6	Adamson Soaring Falcons	1.0

Updated to match(es) played on November 14, 2023. Source: @uaap_official (November 13, 2023). "Here are the team standings in #UAAPSeason86 Chess Championships after the games last weekend, November 11–12 at the FEU Tech Building in Manila" (Tweet) – via X (formerly Twitter).

==== Awards ====
- Most Valuable Player: Melito Ocsan Jr. (UST Growling Tigers)
- Rookie of the Year: Chester Reyes (UST Growling Tigers)

=== Women's tournament ===
==== Elimination round ====
===== Team standings =====
Pos	Team	Match Points
1	FEU Lady Tamaraws	17.0
2	NU Lady Bulldogs	15.0
3	Ateneo Lady Eagles	12.0
4	UP Fighting Maroons	10.0
5	De La Salle Lady Archers	9.0
6	UST Female Woodpushers	5.0
7	Adamson Lady Falcons	4.0

Updated to match(es) played on November 16, 2023. Source: @uaap_official (November 16, 2023). "Here's the team standings in #UAAPSeason86 Women's Chess Championships after the games yesterday, November 15 at the FEU Tech Building in Manila" (Tweet) – via X (formerly Twitter).

==== Awards ====
- Most Valuable Player: Mary Joy Tan (FEU Lady Tamaraws)
- Rookie of the Year: Mhage Sebastian (FEU Lady Tamaraws)

=== Boys' tournament ===
==== Elimination round ====
===== Team standings =====
Pos	Team	Points
1	FEU–D Baby Tamaraws	13.0
2	UST Junior Tiger Woodpushers	11.0
3	Adamson Baby Falcons	4.0
4	Ateneo Blue Eaglets	0.0
5	Zobel Junior Archers	4.0

Updated to match(es) played on November 14, 2023. Source: @uaap_official (November 13, 2023). "Here are the team standings in #UAAPSeason86 Chess Championships after the games last weekend, November 11–12 at the FEU Tech Building in Manila" (Tweet) – via X (formerly Twitter).

==== Awards ====
- Most Valuable Player: Franklin Andes (FEU–D Baby Tamaraws)
- Rookie of the Year: Al-basher Buto (UST Tiger Cubs)

=== Girls' tournament ===
==== Elimination round ====
===== Team standings =====
Pos	Team	Points
1	FEU–D Lady Baby Tamaraws	11.0
2	NUNS Lady Bullpups	10.0
3	UST Junior Tigress Woodpushers	7.0
4	Adamson Lady Baby Falcons	4.0
5	Zobel Junior Lady Archers	0.0

Updated to match(es) played on November 14, 2023. Source: @uaap_official (November 13, 2023). "Here are the team standings in #UAAPSeason86 Chess Championships after the games last weekend, November 11–12 at the FEU Tech Building in Manila" (Tweet) – via X (formerly Twitter).

==== Awards ====
- Most Valuable Player: Ruelle Canino (FEU–D Lady Baby Tamaraws)
- Rookie of the Year: Sara Dalagan (NUNS Lady Bullpups)

== Table tennis ==
The UAAP table tennis championships began on November 8, 2023. The tournament venue is the Amoranto Sports Complex in Quezon City.

=== Men's tournament ===
==== Elimination round ====
Pos	Team	Pld	W	L	Qualification
1	UST Tiger Paddlers	12	12	0	Advance to the Finals (Note: As UST won all of their elimination round games, the stepladder format was used instead of the regular Final Four format.)
2	Ateneo Blue Eagles	12	9	3	Advance to stepladder round 2
3	De La Salle Green Paddlers	12	8	4	Proceed to stepladder round 1
4	Adamson Soaring Falcons	12	5	7	Proceed to stepladder round 1
5	FEU Tamaraw Paddlers	12	4	8	
6	UP Fighting Maroons	12	4	8	
7	UE Red Warriors	12	0	12	

Source: @uaap_official (November 16, 2023). "After the conclusion of the eliminations, here are the team standings for the #UAAPSeason86 Table Tennis Tournament" (Tweet) – via X (formerly Twitter).
Rules for classification: 1) winning percentage; 2) if tied for #2 or #4, one-game playoff; 3) head-to-head record; 4) head-to-head point differential; 5) overall point differential

==== Playoffs ====
Stepladder round 1 (Knockout)
3	La Salle	0
4	Adamson	3

Stepladder round 2 (Knockout)
2	Ateneo	3
4	Adamson	1

Finals (Best-of-three series)
November 23
1	UST	3	3
2	Ateneo	0	0

=== Women's tournament ===
==== Elimination round ====
Pos	Team	Pld	W	L	Qualification
1	De La Salle Lady Paddlers	12	11	1	Advance to the semifinals
2	FEU Lady Paddlers	12	9	3	Advance to the semifinals
3	Ateneo Blue Eagles	12	8	4	Advance to the semifinals
4	UST Lady Paddlers	12	8	4	Advance to the semifinals
5	UP Fighting Maroons	12	4	8	
6	UE Lady Warriors	12	1	11	
7	Adamson Lady Falcons	12	1	11	

Source: @uaap_official (November 16, 2023). "After the conclusion of the eliminations, here are the team standings for the #UAAPSeason86 Table Tennis Tournament" (Tweet) – via X (formerly Twitter).
Rules for classification: 1) winning percentage; 2) if tied for #2 or #4, one-game playoff; 3) head-to-head record; 4) head-to-head point differential; 5) overall point differential

==== Playoffs ====
Semifinals (Nos. 1 & 2 have twice-to-beat advantage)
1	La Salle	3
4	UST	1
2	FEU	2	0
3	Ateneo	3	3

Finals (Best-of-three series)
1	La Salle	3	3
3	Ateneo	0	1

=== Boys' tournament ===
==== Elimination round ====
Pos	Team	Pld	W	L	Qualification
1	UST Junior Tiger Paddlers	10	10	0	Advance to the Finals (Note: As UST won all of their elimination round games, the stepladder format was used instead of the regular Final Four format.)
2	Adamson Baby Falcons	10	8	2	Advance to stepladder round 2
3	UE Junior Red Warriors	10	6	4	Proceed to stepladder round 1
4	De La Salle Junior Green Paddlers	10	4	6	Proceed to stepladder round 1
5	Ateneo Blue Eaglets	10	2	8	
6	UPIS Junior Fighting Maroons	10	0	10	

Source: @uaap_official (November 16, 2023). "After the conclusion of the eliminations, here are the team standings for the #UAAPSeason86 Table Tennis Tournament" (Tweet) – via X (formerly Twitter).
Rules for classification: 1) winning percentage; 2) if tied for #2 or #4, one-game playoff; 3) head-to-head record; 4) head-to-head point differential; 5) overall point differential

==== Playoffs ====
Stepladder round 1 (Knockout)
3	UE	3
4	DLSZ	2

Stepladder round 2 (Knockout)
2	Adamson	3
3	UE	1

Finals (Best-of-three series)
November 23
1	UST	3	3
2	Adamson	0	0

=== Girls' tournament ===
==== Elimination round ====
Pos	Team	Pld	W	L	Qualification
1	UST Junior Tigresses Paddlers	10	10	0	Advance to the Finals (Note: As UST won all of their elimination round games, the stepladder format was used instead of the regular Final Four format.)
2	UE Junior Lady Warriors	10	8	2	Advance to stepladder round 2
3	De La Salle Junior Lady Paddlers	10	6	4	Proceed to stepladder round 1
4	Adamson Lady Baby Falcons	10	4	6	Proceed to stepladder round 1
5	UPIS Junior Maroons	10	1	9	
6	Ateneo Lady Eaglets	10	1	9	

Source: @uaap_official (November 16, 2023). "After the conclusion of the eliminations, here are the team standings for the #UAAPSeason86 Table Tennis Tournament" (Tweet) – via X (formerly Twitter).
Rules for classification: 1) winning percentage; 2) if tied for #2 or #4, one-game playoff; 3) head-to-head record; 4) head-to-head point differential; 5) overall point differential

==== Playoffs ====
Stepladder round 1 (Knockout)
3	DLSZ	3
4	Adamson	0

Stepladder round 2 (Knockout)
2	UE	3
3	DLSZ	1

Finals (Best-of-three series)
November 23
1	UST	3	3
2	UE	0	1

== Tennis ==
The UAAP Season 86 Tennis tournament began on February 17, 2023. The tournament venue is the Felicisimo Ampon Tennis Court at the Rizal Memorial Sports Complex.

=== Men's tournament ===
==== Elimination round ====
Pos	Team	Pld	W	L	Qualification
1	UST Male Tennisters	12	10	2	Twice-to-beat in the semifinals
2	Ateneo Blue Eagles	12	10	2	Twice-to-beat in the semifinals
3	UE Red Warriors	12	9	3	Twice-to-win in the semifinals
4	NU Bulldogs	12	7	5	Twice-to-win in the semifinals
5	UP Fighting Maroons	12	4	8	
6	De La Salle Green Tennisters	12	1	11	
7	Adamson Soaring Falcons (H)	12	1	11	

Rules for classification: 1) number of wins; 2) if tied for #2 or #4, one-game playoff; 3) head-to-head record; 4) match points; 5) matches ratio; 6) games ratio
(H) Hosts

==== Playoffs ====
Semifinals (Nos. 1 & 2 have twice-to-beat advantage)
1	UST	3
4	NU	2
2	Ateneo	3
3	UE	1

Final (Best-of-three series)
1	UST	3	2	3
2	Ateneo	2	3	1

==== Awards ====
- Most Valuable Player: Nilo Ledama (UST Male Tennisters)
- Rookie of the Year: Axl Gonzaga (Ateneo Blue Eagles)

=== Women's tournament ===
==== Elimination round ====
Pos	Team	Pld	W	L	Qualification
1	NU Lady Bulldogs	8	8	0	Advance to the Finals
2	UST Female Tennisters	8	5 (Note: Second-seed playoff: UST 4–1 UP)	3	Advance to the Finals
3	UP Fighting Maroons	8	5	3	
4	Ateneo Blue Eagles	8	1	7	
5	De La Salle Lady Tennisters	8	1	7	

Rules for classification: 1) number of wins; 2) if tied for #2 or #4, one-game playoff; 3) head-to-head record; 4) match points; 5) matches ratio; 6) games ratio

==== Finals ====
Team 1	Series	Team 2	Game 1	Game 2	Game 3
NU Lady Bulldogs	2–1	UST Female Tennisters	1–3	3–1	3–2

==== Awards ====
- Most Valuable Player: Mae Bornia (NU Lady Bulldogs) and Alliah Ragunton (NU Lady Bulldogs)
- Rookie of the Year: Kaye Emana (UST Female Tennisters)

== Swimming ==
The UAAP swimming championships was on November 23 to 25, 2023 at the Teofilo Yldefonso Swimming Pool, Rizal Memorial Sports Complex in Manila.

=== Men's tournament ===
Pos	Team	Pts
1	Ateneo Blue Eagles	405
2	De La Salle Green Archers	329.5
3	UP Fighting Maroons	267.5
4	UST Growling Tigers	209

- Most Valuable Player: Phillip Joaquin Santos (Ateneo Blue Eagles)
- Rookie of the Year: Matthew Alumbres (UP Fighting Maroons)

=== Women's tournament ===
Pos	Team	Pts
1	UP Fighting Maroons	435
2	Ateneo Lady Eagles	351
3	UST Growling Tigresses	192
4	De La Salle Lady Archers	167

- Most Valuable Player: Quendy Fernandez (UP Fighting Maroons)
- Rookie of the Year: Quendy Fernandez (UP Fighting Maroons)

=== Boys' tournament ===
Pos	Team	Pts
1	UST Tiger Cubs	711
2	Ateneo Blue Eaglets	327
3	UPIS Junior Fighting Maroons	70
4	Zobel Junior Archers	64

- Most Valuable Player: Renz Santos (UST Growling Tigers)

=== Girls' tournament ===
Pos	Team	Pts
1	UST Tiger Cubs	557
2	Ateneo Blue Eaglets	264
3	UPIS Junior Fighting Maroons	210
4	Zobel Junior Archers	112

- Most Valuable Player: Patricia Santor (UST Growling Tigers)

== Athletics ==
The UAAP athletics championships were held from November 22 to 26, 2023 at the PhilSports Football and Athletics Stadium in Pasig with Ateneo de Manila University as the event host.

=== Men's tournament ===
==== Team standings ====
Rank	Team	Medals				Points
Rank	Team	1st place, gold medalist(s)	2nd place, silver medalist(s)	3rd place, bronze medalist(s)	Total	Points
1st place, gold medalist(s)	NU	6	5	6	17	312.5
2nd place, silver medalist(s)	UP	7	8	5	20	302
3rd place, bronze medalist(s)	FEU	1	2	3	6	221
4	Adamson	2	2	5	9	170
5	UE	3	3	2	8	166
6	UST	3	1	1	5	148
7	La Salle	0	1	0	1	27
8	Ateneo	0	0	0	0	16.5

==== Awards ====
- Most Valuable Player: Alhryan Labita (UP Fighting Maroons)
- Rookie of the Year: Kent Jardin (Adamson Soaring Falcons)

=== Women's tournament ===
==== Team standings ====
Rank	Team	Medals				Points
Rank	Team	1st place, gold medalist(s)	2nd place, silver medalist(s)	3rd place, bronze medalist(s)	Total	Points
1st place, gold medalist(s)	La Salle	7	6	6	19	301
2nd place, silver medalist(s)	FEU	1	5	7	13	268
3rd place, bronze medalist(s)	UST	6	3	4	13	235
4	UP	3	2	2	7	185
5	UE	3	3	1	7	138
6	NU	1	3	4	8	84.5
7	Adamson	1	1	1	3	54
8	Ateneo	1	0	0	1	16.5

===== Awards =====
- Most Valuable Player: Bernalyn Bejoy (De La Salle Lady Archers)
- Rookie of the Year: Jeanne Arnibal (UST Growling Tigresses)

=== Boys' tournament ===
==== Team standings ====
Rank	Team	Medals				Points
Rank	Team	1st place, gold medalist(s)	2nd place, silver medalist(s)	3rd place, bronze medalist(s)	Total	Points
1st place, gold medalist(s)	Adamson	13	10	6	29	503.5
2nd place, silver medalist(s)	UST	7	8	5	20	390
3rd place, bronze medalist(s)	UE	2	0	8	10	226
4	Ateneo	0	2	2	4	85
5	NUNS	0	2	1	3	40
6	DLSZ	0	0	0	0	33

==== Awards ====
- Most Valuable Player: Hussein Loraña (Adamson Baby Falcons)

=== Girls' tournament ===
==== Team standings ====
Rank	Team	Medals				Points
Rank	Team	1st place, gold medalist(s)	2nd place, silver medalist(s)	3rd place, bronze medalist(s)	Total	Points
1st place, gold medalist(s)	UST	13	10	6	29	488
2nd place, silver medalist(s)	UE	6	7	10	23	444
3rd place, bronze medalist(s)	Adamson	2	5	4	11	235.5
4	Ateneo	0	0	0	0	16
5	DLSZ	0	0	0	0	12

==== Awards ====
- Most Valuable Player: Jyzel Mae Gabriel (UE Junior Lady Warriors)
- Rookie of the Year: Marjorie Ragudos (Adamson Lady Baby Falcons)

=== Medalists ===
==== Men's ====
Event	Gold		Silver		Bronze	
100m	Alhryan Labita; UP	10.57 CR	Kent Francis Jardin; Adamson	10.70	Clint Nino Neri; UP	10.76
200m	Alhryan Labita; UP	21.42 CR	Kent Francis Jardin; Adamson	21.84 PB	Orly Orongan; NU	21.97 PB
400m	Alhryan Labita; UP	48.00 PB	Orly Orongan; NU	48.50 PB	John Lloyd Cabalo; NU	48.77
800m	John Lloyd Cabalo; NU	1:56.40	Erwin Mancao; NU	1:56.85	Edgar John Carado; Adamson	1:58.59
1500m	Erwin Mancao; NU	4:03.43	Germar Marcelo; UP	4:07.45	Michael Karl Gomez; NU	4:07.95
5000m	James Darrel Orduña; UE	15:30.58	Roy Laudit; UP	15:50.59	Germar Marcelo; UP	16:07.76
10000m	James Darrel Orduña; UE	32:15.60	Eduard Josh Buenavista; UP	33:09.28	Roy Laudit; UP	33:29.87
110m hurdles	Van Alexander Obejas; NU	14.55 PB	Edgie Garbin; UE	14.70 PB	Joseph Antiola III; FEU	14.84
400m hurdles	Alhryan Labita; UP	53.70 PB	Van Alexander Obejas; NU	53.87 PB	Joseph Antiola III; FEU	54.40
3000m steeplechase	Erwin Mancao; NU	9:31.78	Eduard Josh Buenavista; UP	9:33.65	Germar Marcelo; UP	9:42.59
5000m walk	Vincent Dela Cruz; UE	22:42.21 CR	Mark Anthony Estoya; FEU	22:48.61	John Aaron Arandia; NU	
10000m walk	Vincent Dela Cruz; UE	49:33.97 CR	Peter Lachica; UP	51:08.11	Mark Anthony Estoya; FEU	51:14.57
4 × 100m relay	UP; Gene Allen Ordinario; Clint Nino Neri; John Carlo Yuzon; Alhryan Labita	41.90	NU; Orly Orongan; Van Alexander Obejas; Mart Dave Rico; Mark Giray	42.61	UE; Lorenz Sediarin; Jerico Pacis; Edgie Garbin; Rodolfo Aldonza Jr.	42.84
4 × 400m relay	NU; Orly Orongan; Marc Allen Sister; Gabriel Gemphil; Van Alexander Obejas	3:17.90	UST; Hokett Delos Santos; Jasper Obanon; Gerald Mark Casimiro; John Romero	3:18.89	UP; John Carlo Yuzon; Marjun Suelleza; Patrick Pabulayan; Alhryan Labita	3:19.40
High jump	Ernie Calipay; FEU	2.05 m CR	Lorenz Sediarin; UE	1.85 m	Alberto Ubano; NU	1.85 m
Pole vault	Hokett Delos Santos; UST	5.00 m	Francis Edward Obiena; La Salle	4.15 m	Romer Magcalayo; UE	3.95 m
Long jump	Clint Nino Neri; UP	7.36 m	Edgie Garbin; UE	7.22 m PB	Kent Francis Jardin; Adamson	7.10 m PB
Triple jump	Kent Francis Jardin; Adamson	14.64 m	Clint Nino Neri; UP	14.61 m	Karl Arvyn Aquino; NU	14.60 m
Shot put	Tyronne Flores; NU	14.93 m CR	Ed Delina; UP	14.32 m PB	Daniel Rambacal; Adamson	13.24 m
Discus throw	Ed Delina; UP	47.28 m CR	Joshua Melgar; NU	47.16 m	Daniel Rambacal; Adamson	41.44 m
Javelin throw	Leandro Malate; Adamson	56.64 m	Joemarie Lazaro; FEU	54.87 m	John Allen Butiong; UST	54.67 m
Hammer throw	Jhon Ballelos; UST	45.63 m	Ed Delina; UP	43.95 m	Daniel Rambacal; Adamson	38.67 m
Decathlon	Hokett Delos Santos; UST	6739 CR	Allen Roy Mationg; FEU	5977	Virgilio Galicia; NU	5589
WR world record | AR area record | CR championship record | GR games record | NR national record | OR Olympic record | PB personal best | SB season best | WL world leading (in a given season)

==== Women's ====
Event	Gold		Silver		Bronze	
100m	Lianne Diana Pama; UST	11.84	Angelyn Ortiz; FEU	12.08	Jessel Lumapas; La Salle	12.09 PB
200m	Lianne Diana Pama; UST	24.16 CR	Jessel Lumapas; La Salle	24.76	Bernalyn Bejoy; La Salle	24.88
400m	Bernalyn Bejoy; La Salle	55.75 PB	Jessel Lumapas; La Salle	55.75 PB	Lenlyn Sanita; NU	57.67
800m	Bernalyn Bejoy; La Salle	2:14.54	Emmalyn Taypin; Adamson	2:14.72 PB	Susan Ramadan; FEU	2:14.72
1500m	Emmalyn Taypin; Adamson	4:52.07	Susan Ramadan; FEU	4:52.36	Ana Marie Eugenio; La Salle	4:55.01
5000m	Abegail Manzano; UP	18:21.17	Remalie Magallanes; UE	18:40.63	Maria Abutas; FEU	19:15.09
10000m	Remalie Magallanes; UE	38:29.31	Mea Gey Ninura; UP	38:57.57	Jessa Mae Roda; NU	40:02.07
100m hurdles	Abcd Agamancos; La Salle	15.03	Patricia Lobos; UE	15.10	Jeanne Arnibal; UST	15.19
400m hurdles	Bernalyn Bejoy; La Salle	1:00.49 PB	Lenlyn Sanita; NU	1:03.46	Josie Inemedo; UP	1:04.13
3000m steeplechase	Jessa Mae Roda; NU	11:24.96	Remalie Magallanes; UE	11:30.33 PB	Maria Abutas; FEU	11:35.23
3000m walk	Sally Campus; UP	15:34.73 CR	Leonalyn Raterta; UST	15:46.48	Yessamin Carbonilla; La Salle	16:03.47
5000m walk	Juliana Talaro; UP	27:54.30	Alana Halaguena; UP	27:54.62	Laurize Wangkay; La Salle	27:56.62
4 × 100m relay	La Salle; Jessel Lumapas; Erica Ruto; Hannah Delotavo; Trexie De La Torre	47.02 CR	FEU; Annie Mercurio; Angelyn Ortiz; Diane Taranza; Cindy Marigon	47.39	UST; Lianne Diana Pama; Mailene Pamisaran; Charlize Villanueva; Justine Catindoy	42.84
4 × 400m relay	La Salle; Jessel Lumapas; Erica Ruto; Bernalyn Bejoy; Hannah Delotavo	3:50.40	FEU; Susan Ramadan; Angelyn Ortiz; Annie Mercurio; Nicole Diloy	3:57.80	UP; Josie Inemedo; Abegail Manzano; Marisol Amarga; Trisha Parajas	3:58.78
High jump	Mariel Abuan; UE	1.66 m	Jeanne Arnibal; UST	1.60 m PB	Angelyn Ortiz; FEU	1.50 m
Pole vault	Jia Kawachi; Ateneo	3.61 m CR	Ma. Khrizzie Ruzol; UST	3.10 m	Jessa Libres; UST	3.10 m
Long jump	Diane Taranza; FEU	6.04 m PB	Trexie De La Torre; La Salle	5.96 m PB	Diana Huraño; Adamson	5.79 m
Triple jump	Jeanne Arnibal; UST	12.28 m	Abcd Agamancos; La Salle	12.16 m	Rica Balderama; FEU	11.88 m
Shot put	Jamela De Asis; UST	12.94 m CR	Daniela Daynata; La Salle	12.67 m PB	Mary Jean Maloloy-On; FEU	11.47 m
Discus throw	Daniela Daynata; La Salle	44.81 m CR	Jane Marie Cambonga; NU	39.65 m	Kasandra Alcantara; UE	38.50 m
Javelin throw	Lanie Carpentero; UST	45.06 m PB	Ann Quitoy; La Salle	40.23 m	Daniela Daynata; La Salle	40.07 m
Hammer throw	Kasandra Alcantara; UE	42.63 m	Jane Marie Cambonga; NU	36.91 m	Lanie Carpentero; UST	36.O3 m
Heptathlon	Jeanne Arnibal; UST	4195	Antonette Aguillon; FEU	3872	Mica Cabaddu; La Salle	3785
WR world record | AR area record | CR championship record | GR games record | NR national record | OR Olympic record | PB personal best | SB season best | WL world leading (in a given season)

== Performance sports ==
=== Cheerdance ===
The UAAP Cheerdance Competition was held on December 2, 2023, at the SM Mall of Asia Arena in Pasay. Cheerdance competition is an exhibition event. Points for the overall championship are not awarded to the participating schools.

==== Team standings ====
Rank	Team	Order	Tumbling	Stunts	Tosses	Pyramids	Dance	Penalties	Points	Percentage
1st place, gold medalist(s)	FEU Cheering Squad	7th	88	84.5	82.5	88	364.5	5	702.50	87.81%
2nd place, silver medalist(s)	NU Pep Squad	2nd	86.5	88.5	81	85	361	5	697	87.13%
3rd place, bronze medalist(s)	UST Salinggawi Dance Troupe	8th	81	79.5	81.5	83	374	15	684	85.50%
4	Adamson Pep Squad	4th	81.5	78.5	80	80	353	8	665	83.13%
5	UP Varsity Pep Squad	5th	66.5	71	67.5	60	343	6	602	75.25%
6	UE Pep Squad	1st	67.5	70.5	72.5	68	287.5	7	559	69.88%
7	DLSU Animo Squad	6th	63.5	62	62	52	327	11	555.50	69.44%
8	Ateneo Blue Eagles	3rd	57	61	65	51	312	14	532	66.50%

== General championship summary ==
The general champion is determined by a point system. The system gives 15 points to the champion team of a UAAP event, 12 to the runner-up, and 10 to the third placer. The following points: 8, 6, 4, 2 and 1 are given to the rest of the participating teams according to their order of finish.

=== Medal tables ===
==== Collegiate division ====
Rank	Team	Gold	Silver	Bronze	Total
1	University of Santo Tomas	9	7	5	21
2	National University	6	7	4	17
3	De La Salle University	4	4	5	13
4	University of the Philippines Diliman	3	5	6	14
5	Ateneo de Manila University	3	5	3	11
6	University of the East*	3	1	1	5
7	Far Eastern University	2	2	6	10
8	Adamson University	1	0	1	2
Totals (8 entries)		31	31	31	93

* Host nation (Season host); General champions
Notes: Results are final.

==== High school division ====
Rank	Team	Gold	Silver	Bronze	Total
1	University of Santo Tomas	8	7	4	19
2	Far Eastern University–Diliman	4	2	2	8
3	National University–Nazareth School	3	4	0	7
4	University of the East*	3	3	2	8
5	Adamson University	3	1	5	9
6	Ateneo de Manila University	0	3	2	5
7	De La Salle Zobel	0	1	4	5
8	UP Integrated School	0	0	2	2
Totals (8 entries)		21	21	21	63

* Host nation (Season host); General champions
Notes: Results are final.

=== General championship tally ===
==== Collegiate division ====
		Basketball		3x3 basketball		Volleyball (indoor)		Volleyball (beach)		Swimming		Chess		Tennis		Table tennis		Badminton		Taekwondo			Judo		Baseball	Softball	Football		Athletics		Fencing		Total			
Rank	Team	M	W	M	W	M	W	M	W	M	W	M	W	M	W	M	W	M	W	M	W	C	M	W	M	W	M	W	M	W	M	W	M	W	C	Overall
1	UST	1	15	8	15	12	12	15	15	8	10	15	4	15	12	15	8	8	8	12	15	15	12	12	8	10	10	6	4	10	12	10	155	162	15	332
2	La Salle	15	6	15	10	8	10	6	1	12	8	6	8	4	6	8	15	6	6	8	10	12	10	6	12	8	6	12	2	15	10	8	128	129	12	269
3	UP	12	10	2	2	2	1	4	8	10	15	10	6	6	10	4	6	10	12	6	8	8	15	8	6	12	15	10	12	8	8	12	122	128	8	258
4	Ateneo	8	8	1	6	6	6	8	6	15	12	12	10	12	8	12	12	15	15	4	4	6	8	10	10	6	8	8	1	1	6	6	126	118	6	250
5	NU	10	12	10	12	15	15	12	12	—	—	—	12	8	15	—	—	12	10	15	12	10	—	—	15	—	—	—	15	4	—	—	112	104	10	226
6	FEU	2	2	4	1	10	8	10	10	—	—	8	15	—	—	6	10	—	—	10	6	4	—	—	—	—	12	15	10	12	—	—	72	79	4	155
7	UE (H)	4	1	12	4	1	4	1	2	—	—	—	—	10	—	2	4	—	—	—	—	—	—	15	—	—	4	—	6	6	15	15	55	51	0	106
8	Adamson	6	4	6	8	4	2	2	4	—	—	4	2	2	—	10	2	4	4	—	—	—	—	—	4	15	2	—	8	2	—	—	52	43	0	95

(H) Season host; = Champion; = Runner-up; = Third place; — = No team.
Notes: Results are final.

==== High School division ====
		Basketball	3x3 basketball		Volleyball (indoor)		Volleyball (beach)		Swimming		Chess		Table tennis		Taekwondo	Judo		Football	Athletics		Fencing		Total		
Rank	Team	B	B	G	B	G	B	G	B	G	B	G	B	G	B	B	G	B	B	G	B	G	B	G	Overall
1	UST	8	12	15	8	10	10	15	15	15	12	10	15	15	12	15	12	12	12	15	12	10	143	117	260
2	DLSZ	4	8	8	4	6	4	6	8	8	6	6	8	10	6	10	10	10	4	6	8	12	80	72	152
3	Adamson	15	10	10	6	15	8	10	—	—	10	8	12	8	—	—	—	—	15	10	—	—	76	61	137
4	UE (H)	6	4	—	12	—	6	—	—	—	—	—	10	12	—	8	15	—	10	12	15	15	71	54	125
5	Ateneo	2	1	—	1	4	2	4	12	12	8	—	6	4	10	12	8	8	8	8	10	—	80	40	120
5	FEU–D	10	15	—	10	8	12	12	—	—	15	15	—	—	8	—	—	15	—	—	—	—	85	35	120
7	NUNS	12	2	12	15	12	15	8	—	—	—	12	—	—	15	—	—	—	6	—	—	—	65	44	109
8	UPIS	1	6	—	2	2	1	2	10	10	—	—	4	6	4	—	—	—	—	—	—	—	28	20	48

(H) Season host; = Champion; = Runner-up; = Third place; — = No team.
Notes: Results are final.
- Collegiate division athletes of the year:
  - Individual sports: Quendy Fernandez (UP Fighting Maroons, swimming)
  - Team sports: Kent Pastrana (UST Growling Tigers, basketball)
- High school division athletes of the year:
  - Individual sports:
  - Team sports:

== See also ==
- NCAA Season 99
