= UAAP Season 87 football tournaments =

Philippine college football tournament

UAAP Season 87 Football
- Stronger, Better, Together
Men's Finals	G1 (PSO)	Wins
Ateneo Blue Eagles	1 (3)	0
FEU Tamaraws	1 (4)	1
- Arena(s): Rizal Memorial Stadium, Manila
- Finals MVP: Allan Diansuy
- Winning coach: Roman Oliver
- Semifinalists: UP Fighting Maroons; UST Growling Tigers
- TV network(s): One Sports; UAAP Varsity Channel
Women's Finals	G1	Wins
FEU Lady Tamaraws	3	1
DLSU Lady Booters	2	0
- Arena(s): Rizal Memorial Stadium, Manila
- Finals MVP: Carmela Altiche
- Winning coach: Let Dimzon
Juniors' Finals	G1	Wins
FEU–D Baby Tamaraws	1	0
UST Tiger Cubs	2	1
- Arena(s): UP Diliman Football Stadium, Quezon City
- Finals MVP: Stephen Flores
- Winning coach: Marjo Allado
- Semifinalists: Zobel Junior Archers; Southridge Admirals

The UAAP Season 87 collegiate division football tournament started on September 15, 2024. Both the collegiate and high school divisions were played at the UP Diliman Football Stadium in Quezon City. This marks the first season to feature the collegiate division on the first semester to avoid the summer heats in the second semester while the high school boys' division will remain on the second semester.

This is also the first time guest teams are invited, with Claret School and PAREF-Southridge signing a MOA with UAAP to join in the High School Boys' Division which will start on January 18, 2025.

== Tournament format ==
The UAAP continued to use the UAAP Final Four format for the Men's Division. A double round-robin elimination round format with a knockout Final Four if no team sweeps the elimination round and a stepladder format if a team sweeps the elimination round. Women's division will also feature a double round-robin elimination round with the top two teams proceeding to the Final.

After signing a Memorandum of Agreement with Claret School and PAREF-Southridge, that allows them to participate as guest teams this season, UAAP Football High School Boys' Division will have a double round-robin elimination with a knockout Final Four.

== Men's tournament ==
=== Elimination round ===
==== Team standings ====
Pos	Team	Pld	W	D	L	GF	GA	GD	Pts	Qualification
1	Ateneo Blue Eagles	12	9	1	2	33	12	+21	28	Qualification for semifinals
2	UP Fighting Maroons	12	8	2	2	30	8	+22	26	Qualification for semifinals
3	FEU Tamaraws (H)	12	7	3	2	32	11	+21	24	Qualification for semifinals
4	UST Golden Booters	12	4	2	6	16	22	−6	14	Qualification for semifinals
5	De La Salle Green Booters	12	3	1	8	13	31	−18	10	
6	UE Red Warriors	12	2	3	7	15	31	−16	9	
7	Adamson Soaring Falcons	12	3	0	9	10	34	−24	9	

Source: The UAAP
(H) Hosts

==== Match-up results ====
	Round 1						Round 2					
Team ╲ Game	1	2	3	4	5	6	7	8	9	10	11	12
Adamson Soaring Falcons	FEU school colors	Ateneo school colors	UP school colors	UE school colors	UST school colors	La Salle school colors	FEU school colors	Ateneo school colors	UST school colors	UP school colors	La Salle school colors	UE school colors
Ateneo Blue Eagles	Adamson school colors	La Salle school colors	FEU school colors	UP school colors	UST school colors	UE school colors	Adamson school colors	UP school colors	La Salle school colors	FEU school colors	UE school colors	UST school colors
De La Salle Green Booters	UE school colors	Ateneo school colors	UST school colors	FEU school colors	Adamson school colors	UP school colors	UST school colors	UE school colors	Ateneo school colors	FEU school colors	Adamson school colors	UP school colors
FEU Tamaraws	Adamson school colors	UE school colors	Ateneo school colors	La Salle school colors	UST school colors	UP school colors	Adamson school colors	UE school colors	UST school colors	Ateneo school colors	La Salle school colors	UP school colors
UE Red Warriors	UST school colors	La Salle school colors	FEU school colors	Adamson school colors	UP school colors	Ateneo school colors	UP school colors	FEU school colors	La Salle school colors	UST school colors	Ateneo school colors	Adamson school colors
UP Fighting Maroons	UST school colors	Adamson school colors	Ateneo school colors	UE school colors	FEU school colors	La Salle school colors	UE school colors	Ateneo school colors	Adamson school colors	UST school colors	FEU school colors	La Salle school colors
UST Golden Booters	UE school colors	UP school colors	La Salle school colors	Adamson school colors	FEU school colors	Ateneo school colors	La Salle school colors	Adamson school colors	FEU school colors	UE school colors	UP school colors	Ateneo school colors

Source: The UAAP
= Win; = Draw; = Loss

==== Results ====
Teams	AdU	ATENEO	DLSU	FEU	UE	UP	UST
Adamson Soaring Falcons		1–3	2–4	0–3	0–3	0–3	0–1
Ateneo Blue Eagles	7–1		4–1 (Note: The initial opening match on September 15 was abandoned at 0–0 after 14 minutes due to heavy rain and lightning.)	2–1	3–1	2–0	2–0
De La Salle Green Archers	1–2	0–4		0–2	1–1	0–2	1–0
FEU Tamaraws	0–6	1–0	5–2		4–0	1–1	2–4
UE Red Warriors	1–2	3–3	0–2	0–5		0–3	2–1
UP Fighting Maroons	1–0	1–0	7–0	2–2	4–1		0–1
UST Growling Tigers	1–2	2–3	2–1	0–0	3–3	1–6	

Source: The UAAP
Legend: Blue = left column team win; Yellow = draw; Red = top row team win.

==== Playoffs ====
Semifinals (Knockout)
Dec 8
1	Ateneo	2
4	UST	1
Dec 8
2	UP	0
3	FEU	1

Finals (Knockout)
Dec 15
1	Ateneo	1 (3)
3	FEU (p)	1 (4)

==== Semifinals ====
December 8, 2024
16:30

UP Fighting Maroons	0–1	FEU Tamaraws
		Karl Absalon 76'

Rizal Memorial Stadium, Manila
December 8, 2024
19:00

Ateneo Blue Eagles	2–1	UST Golden Booters
Leo Maquiling 14'; Jet Dela Cruz 70'		Kyler Escobar 45+4'

Rizal Memorial Stadium, Manila

=== Finals ===
December 15, 2024
17:00

Ateneo Blue Eagles	1–1 (a.e.t.)	FEU Tamaraws
Maquiling 72'		Libarnes 65'
Penalties
Maquiling (penalty scored); Cariño (penalty scored); Bengson (penalty scored); Roxas (penalty missed); Flores (penalty missed)	3–4	Libarnes (penalty scored); Aban (penalty missed); Nañiel (penalty scored); Mustapa (penalty scored); Braga (penalty scored)

Rizal Memorial Stadium, Manila
Referee: Mick John Pineda

=== Statistics ===
As of 1 December 2024

==== Top goalscorers ====
Team eliminated / inactive for this round.

Rank	Player	Team	Round 1						Round 2						SF	F	Total
Rank	Player	Team	M1	M2	M3	M4	M5	M6	M7	M8	M9	M10	M11	M12	SF	F	Total
1	(Philippines) Dov Cariño	Ateneo Blue Eagles	2		1	2	1		1		2			2			9
1	(Philippines) Leo Maquiling	Ateneo Blue Eagles						2	3				1	1	1	1	9
3	(Philippines) Ramil Bation III	UP Fighting Maroons		1				1				3		2			7
3	(Philippines) Joseph Garces	UP Fighting Maroons		1		2	1	1					2				7
5	(Philippines) Karl Absalon	FEU Tamaraws		1			1		1	1				1	1		6
6	(Philippines) Edgar Aban	FEU Tamaraws	2	2		1											5
6	(Philippines) Selwyn Mamon	FEU Tamaraws		1					2	1				1			5
6	(Philippines) Theo Libarnes	FEU Tamaraws				1		1		1			1			1	5
9	(Philippines) Macky Tobias	UP Fighting Maroons							2		1	1					4
9	(Philippines) Lucas Aguilar	De La Salle Green Archers			1					2		1					4
9	(Philippines) Jam Mariveles	UE Red Warriors				2							1	1			4

==== Hat-tricks ====
Player	School	Result	Against	Date
(Philippines) Leo Maquiling	Ateneo Blue Eagles	7–1^{R2}	Adamson Soaring Falcons	7 November 2024
(Philippines) Ramil Bation III	UP Fighting Maroons	6–1^{R2}	UST Growling Tigers	24 November 2024

Note

^{R1} Round 1
^{R2} Round 2

==== Own goals ====
Rank	Player	School	Against	Own goals
1	(Philippines) Mark Maghinay	UE Red Warriors	Ateneo Blue Eagles	1

==== Top assists ====
Rank	Player	School	Assists
1	(Philippines) Dov Cariño	Ateneo Blue Eagles	11
2	(Philippines) Chester Tidor	UP Fighting Maroons	6
3	(Philippines) Khent Valenzuela	FEU Tamaraws	5
4	(Philippines) Matti Roxas	Ateneo Blue Eagles	4
4	(Philippines) Kyler Escobar	UST Growling Tigers	4
4	(Philippines) Edgar Aban	FEU Tamaraws	4
4	(Philippines) John Bernard Magallon	UE Red Warriors	4
4	(Philippines) John Nicho Sumanoy	UE Red Warriors	4
9	(Philippines) Ramil Bation III	UP Fighting Maroons	3
9	(Philippines) Karl Absalon	FEU Tamaraws	3
9	(Philippines) Leo Maquiling	Ateneo Blue Eagles	3
9	(Philippines) Paolo Go	FEU Tamaraws	3
9	(Philippines) Jerome Abarca	UE Red Warriors	3
9	(Philippines) Selwyn Mamon	FEU Tamaraws	3
9	(Philippines) Dexter Casing	Adamson Soaring Falcons	3

==== Clean sheets ====
Rank	Player	School	Matches
1	(Philippines) Mon Diansuy	FEU Tamaraws	5
2	(Philippines) Fonzy Gonzalez	UP Fighting Maroons	4
3	(Philippines) Artuz Cezar	Ateneo Blue Eagles	4
4	(Philippines) Jetrick Fabrigas	FEU Tamaraws	2
4	(Philippines) Enrico Mangaoang	De La Salle Green Archers	2
4	(Philippines) Miguel Abada	UST Growling Tigers	2
7	(Philippines) Jan Tambilawan	Adamson Soaring Falcons	1
7	(Philippines) Mark Daig	UST Growling Tigers	1
7	(Philippines) Chevery Celeste	UP Fighting Maroons	1
7	(Philippines) Eric Cachuella	UP Fighting Maroons	1

==== Player of the Match ====
Rank	Player	School	Matches	Against
1	(Philippines) Dov Cariño	Ateneo Blue Eagles	7	Adamson^{1}, FEU^{1}, UP^{1}, UST^{1}, Adamson^{2}, UE^{2}, UST^{2}
2	(Philippines) Ramil Bation III	UP Fighting Maroons	3	Adamson^{1}, UST^{2}, FEU^{2}
3	(Philippines) Edgar Aban	FEU Tamaraws	2	Adamson^{1}, UE^{1}
3	(Philippines) Gabriel Suarez	De La Salle Green Archers	2	UE^{1}, Adamson^{1}
3	(Philippines) Benjamin Palacio	UP Fighting Maroons	2	FEU^{1}, La Salle^{1}
3	(Philippines) Leo Maquiling	Ateneo Blue Eagles	2	UE^{1}, Adamson^{2}
3	(Philippines) Lucas Aguilar	De La Salle Green Archers	2	UST^{1}, UE^{2}
3	(Philippines) Macky Tobias	UP Fighting Maroons	2	UE^{2}, Adamson^{2}
3	(Philippines) Ace Amita	FEU Tamaraws	2	Adamson^{2}, Ateneo^{2}
3	(Philippines) Joseph Garces	UP Fighting Maroons	2	UE^{1}, La Salle^{2}

Note

^{1} Round 1
^{2} Round 2

==== Awards ====
UAAP Season 87 men's football champions
FEU Tamaraws
12th title

- Most Valuable Player: Mon Diansuy (FEU Tamaraws)
- Rookie of the Year: Edgar Aban Jr. (FEU Tamaraws)
- Golden Boot: Dov Cariño (Ateneo Blue Eagles)
- Best Striker: Leo Maquiling (Ateneo Blue Eagles)
- Best Midfielder: Dov Cariño (Ateneo Blue Eagles)
- Best Defender: Jet Dela Cruz (Ateneo Blue Eagles)
- Best Goalkeeper: Artuz Cezar (Ateneo Blue Eagles)
- Fair Play Award: Ateneo Blue Eagles

== Women's tournament ==
=== Elimination round ===
==== Team standings ====
Pos	Team	Pld	W	D	L	GF	GA	GD	Pts	Qualification
1	FEU Lady Tamaraws (H)	8	7	1	0	16	2	+14	22	Qualification for finals
2	De La Salle Lady Booters	8	4	2	2	14	7	+7	14	Qualification for finals
3	UST Lady Booters	8	2	2	4	8	9	−1	8	
4	UP Fighting Maroons	8	2	2	4	4	14	−10	8	
5	Ateneo Blue Eagles	8	1	1	6	3	13	−10	4	

Updated to match(es) played on November 30, 2024. Source: The UAAP
(H) Hosts

==== Match-up results ====
	Round 1				Round 2			
Team ╲ Game	1	2	3	4	5	6	7	8
Ateneo Blue Eagles	UP school colors	FEU school colors	La Salle school colors	UST school colors	UP school colors	UST school colors	La Salle school colors	FEU school colors
De La Salle Lady Archers	UST school colors	UP school colors	Ateneo school colors	FEU school colors	UST school colors	Ateneo school colors	FEU school colors	UP school colors
FEU Lady Tamaraws	Ateneo school colors	UST school colors	UP school colors	La Salle school colors	UP school colors	UST school colors	La Salle school colors	Ateneo school colors
UP Fighting Maroons	Ateneo school colors	La Salle school colors	FEU school colors	UST school colors	Ateneo school colors	FEU school colors	UST school colors	La Salle school colors
UST Growling Tigresses	La Salle school colors	FEU school colors	Ateneo school colors	UP school colors	La Salle school colors	Ateneo school colors	FEU school colors	UP school colors

Updated to match(es) played on November 30, 2024. Source: The UAAP
= Win; = Draw; = Loss

==== Results ====
School	ATENEO	DLSU	FEU	UP	UST
Ateneo Blue Eagles		0–1	0–3	0–1	1–0
De La Salle Lady Booters	5–2		1–1	3–1	2–0
FEU Lady Tamaraws	7–1	1–0		3–1	1–0
UP Fighting Maroons	0–0	1–0	0–5		1–1
UST Lady Booters	3–0	2–2	0–2	2–0	

Updated to match(es) played on November 30, 2024. Source: The UAAP
Legend: Blue = left column team win; Yellow = draw; Red = top row team win.

=== Final ===
December 14, 2024
17:00

FEU Lady Tamaraws	3–2	De La Salle Lady Booters
Judie Arevalo 28'; Carmela Altiche 45+7' (pen.); Regine Rebosura 68'		Chenny Dañoso 33'; Rochelle Mendaño 57'

Rizal Memorial Stadium, Manila
Referee: Timothy De Castro

=== Statistics ===
==== Top goalscorers ====
Team eliminated / inactive for this round.

Rank	Player	Team	Round 1				Round 2				F	Total
Rank	Player	Team	M1	M2	M3	M4	M5	M6	M7	M8	F	Total
1	(Philippines) Dani Tanjangco	De La Salle Lady Booters	1	2				2				5
1	(Philippines) Dionesa Tolentin	FEU Lady Tamaraws	1		2					2		5
3	(Philippines) Regine Rebosura	FEU Lady Tamaraws	1		1			1			1	4
3	(Philippines) Angely Alferez	Ateneo Blue Eagles				1			2	1		4
3	(Philippines) Carmela Altiche	FEU Lady Tamaraws					2			1	1	4
6	(Philippines) Christy Logastua	UST Lady Booters						1		2		3
6	(Philippines) Judie Arevalo	FEU Lady Tamaraws				1	1				1	3
8	(Philippines) Hannah Muros	UP Fighting Maroons		1	1							2
8	(Philippines) Arantxa Mari Trebol	De La Salle Lady Booters	1				1					2
8	(Philippines) Shai Del Campo	De La Salle Lady Booters				1	1					2
8	(Philippines) Judy Mae Prado	UST Lady Booters				1		1				2
8	(Philippines) Gleydile Añonuevo	UST Lady Booters					1	1				2
8	(Philippines) Kyza Colina	FEU Lady Tamaraws					2					2
8	(Philippines) Maegan Alforque	De La Salle Lady Booters						2				2
8	(Philippines) Ma. Angel Egay	FEU Lady Tamaraws								2		2
8	(Philippines) Chenny Mae Dañoso	De La Salle Lady Booters						1			1	2

==== Own goals ====
Rank	Player	School	Against	Own goals
1	(Philippines) Chenny Mae Dañoso	De La Salle Lady Booters	FEU Lady Tamaraws	1
1	(Philippines) Janna Santerva	UST Lady Booters	FEU Lady Tamaraws	1

==== Top assists ====
Rank	Player	School	Assists
1	(Philippines) Carmela Altiche	FEU Lady Tamaraws	5
2	(Philippines) Shai Del Campo	De La Salle Lady Booters	4
3	(Philippines) Judie Arevalo	FEU Lady Tamaraws	3
3	(Philippines) Dionesa Tolentin	FEU Lady Tamaraws	3
3	(Philippines) Janly Fontamillas	FEU Lady Tamaraws	3
3	(Philippines) Lovely Fernandez	UST Lady Booters	3
7	(Philippines) Marinelle Cristobal	FEU Lady Tamaraws	2
7	(Philippines) Chenny Mae Dañoso	De La Salle Lady Booters	2
7	(Philippines) Gleydile Añonuevo	UST Lady Booters	2
7	(Philippines) Angelica Teves	De La Salle Lady Booters	2

==== Clean sheets ====
Rank	Player	School	Matches
1	(Philippines) Yasmin Elauria	FEU Lady Tamaraws	4
2	(Philippines) Jessica Pido	De La Salle Lady Booters	3
3	(Philippines) Eunice Eduave	UP Fighting Maroons	2
3	(Philippines) Chelssy Casals	Ateneo Blue Eagles	2
3	(Philippines) Lizlie Garcia	UST Growling Tigers	2
6	(Philippines) Jessa Lehayan	FEU Tamaraws	1

==== Players of the Match ====
Rank	Player	School	Matches	Against
1	(Philippines) Dionesa Tolentin	FEU Lady Tamaraws	2	Ateneo^{1}, UP^{1}
1	(Philippines) Gleydile Añonuevo	UST Lady Booters	2	La Salle^{2}, Ateneo^{2}
1	(Philippines) Carmela Altiche	FEU Lady Tamaraws	2	UST^{2}, La Salle^{F}
2	(Philippines) Shai Del Campo	De La Salle Lady Booters	1	UST^{1}
2	(Philippines) Eunice Eduave	UP Fighting Maroons	1	Ateneo^{1}
2	(Philippines) Dani Tanjangco	De La Salle Green Archers	1	UP^{1}
2	(Philippines) Elisha Lubiano	De La Salle Lady Booters	1	Ateneo^{1}
2	(Philippines) Marinelle Cristobal	FEU Lady Tamaraws	1	UST^{1}
2	(Philippines) Angely Alferez	Ateneo Blue Eagles	1	UST^{1}
2	(Philippines) Jearfelyn Ramos	UST Lady Booters	1	UP^{1}
2	(Philippines) Judie Arevalo	FEU Lady Tamaraws	1	La Salle^{1}
2	(Philippines) Chelssy Casals	Ateneo Blue Eagles	1	UP^{2}
2	(Philippines) Kyza Colina	FEU Lady Tamaraws	1	UP^{2}
2	(Philippines) Maegan Alforque	De La Salle Lady Booters	1	Ateneo^{2}
2	(Philippines) Christy Logastua	UST Growling Tigresses	1	UP^{2}
2	(Philippines) Janly Fontamillas	FEU Lady Tamaraws	1	La Salle^{2}
2	(Philippines) Ma. Angel Egay	FEU Lady Tamaraws	1	Ateneo^{2}
2	(Philippines) Kim Yoojin	UP Lady Maroons	1	La Salle^{2}

Note

^{1} Round 1
^{2} Round 2
^{F} Finals

=== Awards ===
UAAP Season 87 women's football champions
FEU Lady Tamaraws
13th title, third consecutive title

- Most Valuable Player: Carmela Altiche ( FEU Lady Tamaraws)
- Rookie of the Year: Dani Tanjangco ( De La Salle Lady Archers)
- Golden Boot: Dionesa Tolentin ( FEU Lady Tamaraws) and Dani Tanjangco ( De La Salle Lady Archers)
- Best Striker: Dani Tanjangco ( De La Salle Lady Archers)
- Best Midfielder: Dionesa Tolentin ( FEU Lady Tamaraws)
- Best Defender: Jonela Albiño ( FEU Tamaraws)
- Best Goalkeeper: Yasmin Elauria( FEU Tamaraws)
- Fair Play Award: FEU Tamaraws

== Boys' tournament ==
=== Elimination round ===
==== Team standings ====
Pos	Team	Pld	W	D	L	GF	GA	GD	Pts	Qualification
1	FEU–D Baby Tamaraws (H)	10	9	1	0	22	0	+22	28	Qualification for semifinals
2	UST Tiger Cubs	10	7	1	2	13	0	+13	22	Qualification for semifinals
3	Zobel Junior Archers	10	4	1	5	0	0	0	13	Qualification for semifinals
4	Southridge Admirals (G)	10	3	2	5	0	1	−1	11	Qualification for semifinals
5	Ateneo Blue Eagles	10	3	1	6	0	6	−6	10	
6	Claret Red Roosters (G)	10	1	0	9	0	28	−28	3	

First match(es) will be played: January 18, 2025. Source:
(G) Guests; (H) Hosts

==== Match-up results ====
	Round 1					Round 2				
Team ╲ Game	1	2	3	4	5	6	7	8	9	10
Ateneo Blue Eagles	La Salle school colors	Claret school colors	FEU school colors	UST school colors	PAREF school colors	La Salle school colors	Claret school colors	FEU school colors	UST school colors	PAREF school colors
Claret Red Roosters	FEU school colors	Ateneo school colors	UST school colors	PAREF school colors	La Salle school colors	FEU school colors	Ateneo school colors	UST school colors	PAREF school colors	La Salle school colors
Zobel Junior Archers	Ateneo school colors	UST school colors	PAREF school colors	FEU school colors	Claret school colors	Ateneo school colors	UST school colors	PAREF school colors	FEU school colors	Claret school colors
FEU–D Baby Tamaraws	Claret school colors	PAREF school colors	Ateneo school colors	La Salle school colors	UST school colors	Claret school colors	PAREF school colors	Ateneo school colors	La Salle school colors	UST school colors
Southridge Admirals	UST school colors	FEU school colors	La Salle school colors	Claret school colors	Ateneo school colors	UST school colors	FEU school colors	La Salle school colors	Claret school colors	Ateneo school colors
UST Tiger Cubs	PAREF school colors	La Salle school colors	Claret school colors	Ateneo school colors	FEU school colors	PAREF school colors	La Salle school colors	Claret school colors	Ateneo school colors	FEU school colors

First match(es) will be played on January 18, 2025. Source:
= Win; = Draw; = Loss

==== Results ====
Teams	ATENEO	CSQC	DLSZ	FEU–D	SRG	UST
Ateneo Blue Eagles		3–1	0–1	0–2	3–0	2–5
Claret Red Roosters	2–3		1–4	0–6	0–4	1–5
Zobel Junior Archers	3–0	2–3		0–3	1–0	0–0
FEU–D Baby Tamaraws	1–0	5–0	2–0		1–0	2–1
Southridge Admirals	1–1	3–0	2–1	1–1		2–5
UST Tiger Cubs	3–1	1–0	2–1	2–3	1–0	

First match(es) will be played: January 18, 2025. Source:
Legend: Blue = left column team win; Yellow = draw; Red = top row team win.

==== Playoffs ====
Semifinals (Knockout)
Mar 22
1	FEU	1
4	Southridge	0
Mar 22
2	UST	2
3	La Salle	1

Finals (Knockout)
Mar 29
1	FEU	1
2	UST	2

==== Awards ====
UAAP Season 87 boys' football champions
UST Tiger Cubs
First title

- Most Valuable Player: Stephen Flores (UST Tiger Cubs)
- Rookie of the Year: Jerriemy Biton (FEU–D Baby Tamaraws)
- Golden Boot: Jerriemy Biton (FEU–D Baby Tamaraws)
- Best Striker: Jerriemy Biton (FEU–D Baby Tamaraws)
- Best Midfielder: Joshua Moleje (UST Tiger Cubs)
- Best Defender: Bacchus Ekberg (Zobel Junior Archers)
- Best Goalkeeper: Paolo Tansingco (Southridge Admirals)
- Fair Play Award: FEU–D Baby Tamaraws

== See also ==
- UAAP Season 87
