= Claret School of Quezon City =

Roman Catholic school in Quezon City, Philippines

- Paaralang Claret ng Lungsod Quezon (Filipino)

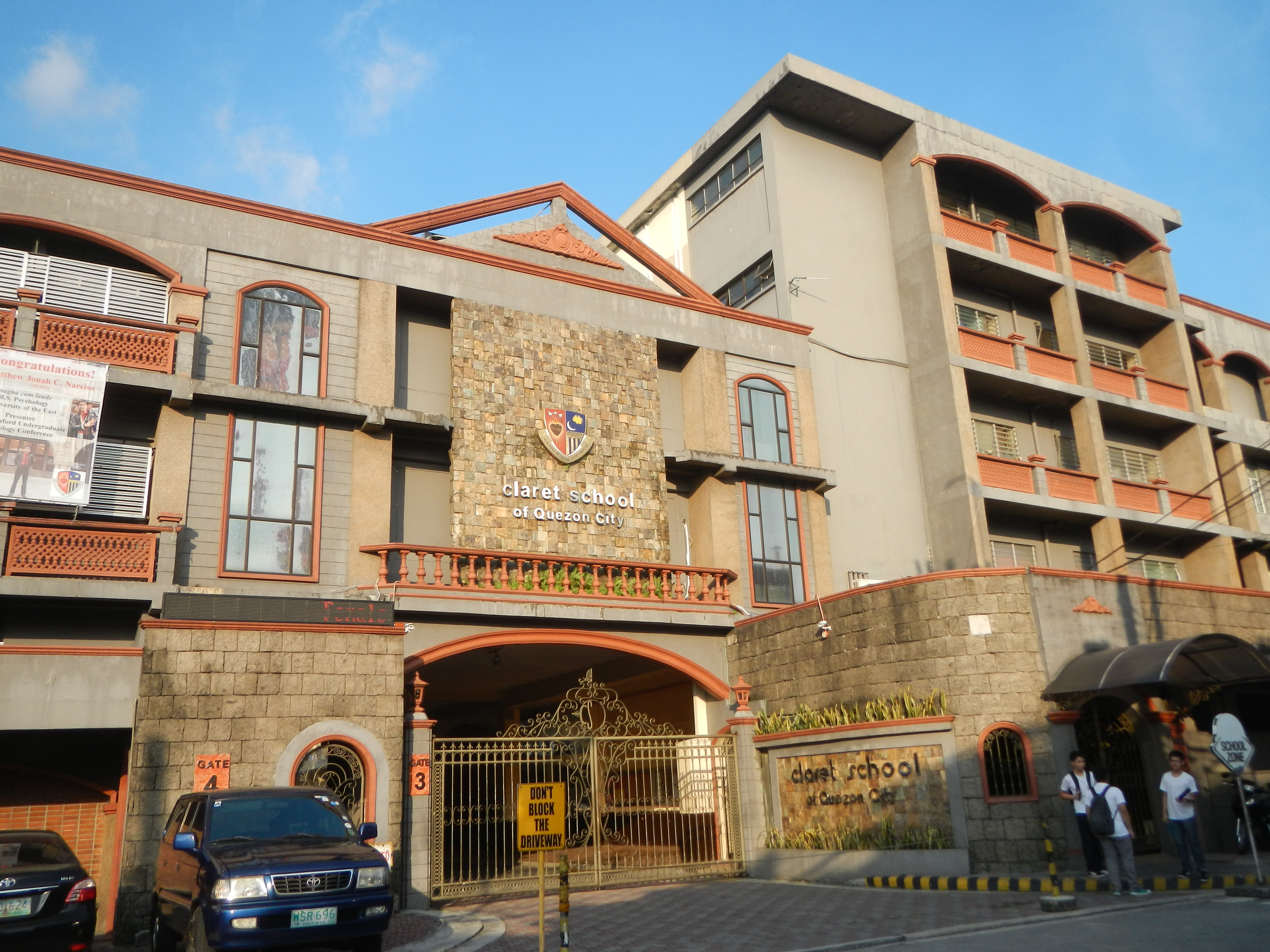

Location
- Mahinhin St., UP Village, Diliman; Quezon City, Metro Manila; Philippines; 14°38′48″N 121°3′20″E

Information
- Type: Private / Non-profit
- Motto: Latin: Scientia maxime cum virtute English: Knowledge is best with virtue
- Religious affiliation: Catholic Church (Claretian)
- Patron saint: Anthony Mary Claret
- Established: June 1967; 59 years ago
- Founders: Missionary Sons of the Immaculate Heart of Mary
- President: Very Rev. Fr. Victor F. Sadaya, CMF, PhD
- Principal: Mrs. Evelyn B. Ángeles
- Chaplain: Rev. Fr. Jeffrey C. Rasay, CMF
- Grades: K to 12
- Gender: Male (until 2020); Coed (Senior High School since 2021)
- Enrollment: ~4,100
- Campus: Urban; 2.9101 hectares (29,101 m^{2})
- Student union: Central Board of Students
- Colors: Scarlet and royal blue
- Song: Claret March
- Athletics: UAAP, AAPS, PAYA, PRADA, RFA, QCAA
- Mascot: Chant the Red Rooster
- Nickname: Claret Red Roosters
- Accreditations: CEAP; PAASCU
- Newspaper: The Claretian (Grade School); Tanglaw Ng Claret (High School)
- Affiliations: ACSP; PRISSAAP; APSA; TAAP; BSP-Quezon City Council; QC-MCGSC; Student Catholic Action of the Philippines-National Capital Region Cluster; Children's Museum and Library, Inc.
- Website: www.claretschool.edu.ph

Claret School of Quezon City (Filipino: Paaralang Claret ng Lungsod Quezon), also referred to by its acronym CSQC or colloquially as Claret, is a private Catholic basic education institution run by the Missionary Sons of the Immaculate Heart of Mary in Quezon City, Philippines. It was established by the Claretians in June 1967 and was named after its patron saint, Anthony Mary Claret, who founded the Claretians in 1849. The school also has a Child Study Center which allows girls up to the Kindergarten level.

== History ==
School Directors of Claret School of Quezon City
- 1967-81: Rev.Fr.Santiago González, CMF
- 1981: Rev. Fr. Julián Mateos, CMF; Rev. Fr. Jesús Vásquez, CMF; Rev. Fr. Emilio Pablo, CMF; Rev. Fr.Luis Fernández Rey, CMF; Rev.Fr.Domingo Moraleda, CMF
- 1981-95: Dr. Enrique Coralejo
- 1995-2001: Rev. Fr. Agapito Ferrero, CMF
- 2001-06: Rev.Fr. Felimon P. Libot, CMF
- 2006-09: Rev. Fr. Salvador G. Agualada, Jr., CMF
- 2009-10: Rev. Fr. Eduardo C. Apungan, CMF
- 2010–13: Rev.Fr.Renato B.Manubag, CMF
- 2013–16: Rev. Fr. Christian James DL. Castro, CMF
- 2016-17: Rev. Fr. Efrén L. Limpo, CMF
- 2017-2025: Rev.Fr. Mauricio T. Ulep, CMF
- 2025-present: Rev.Fr. Victor F. Sadaya, CMF, PhD

The Claretian fathers dreamt of building a school in the Philippines after they had started their missions in Zamboanga and Basilan. They needed a base to serve as the center for Claretian activities in the country.

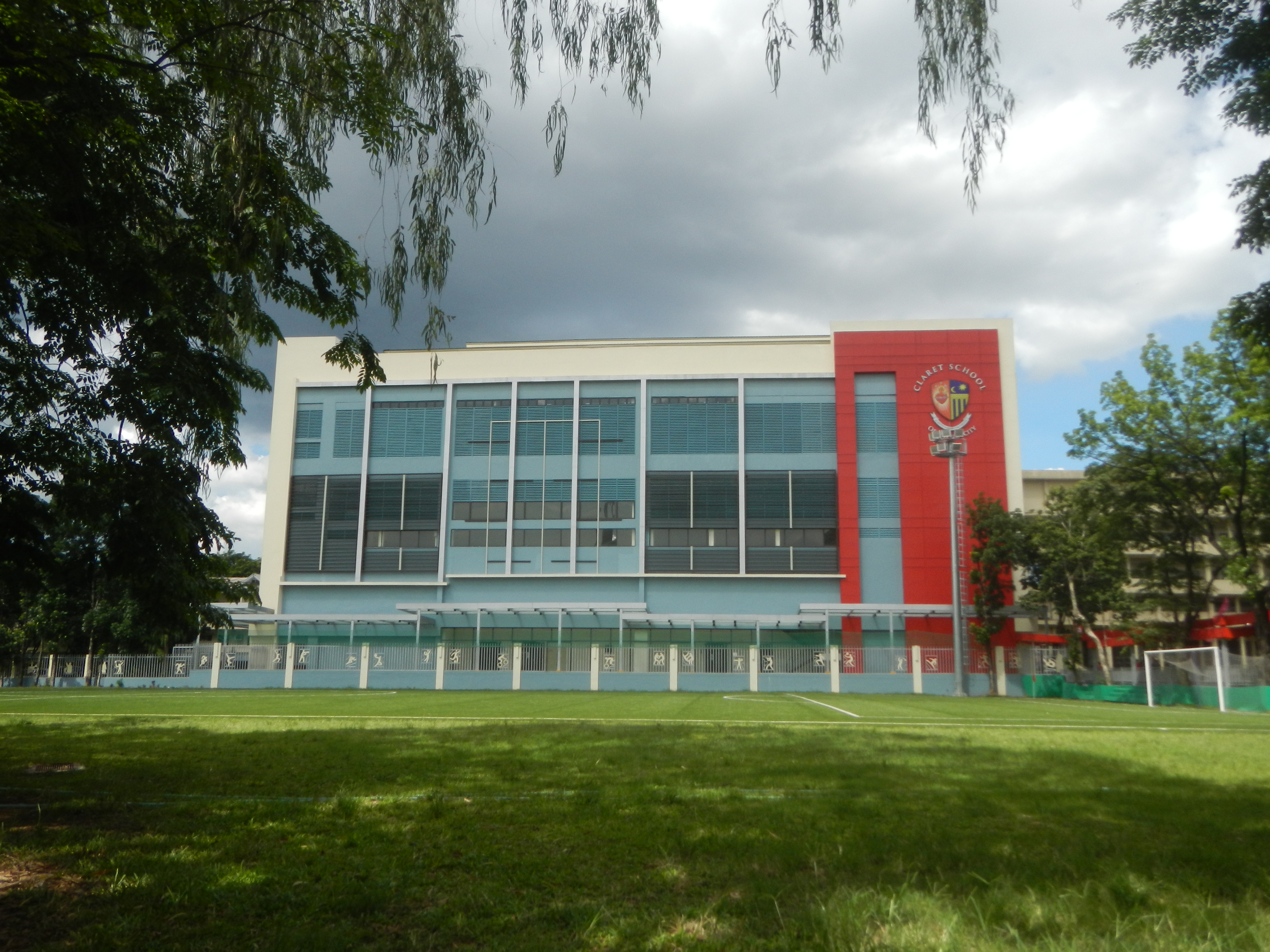
Fr. Rhoel Gallardo Hall

In the late 1960s, Fr. José Querexeta, CMF, former bishop of the Territorial Prelature of Isabela, acquired a 29,101 square meter lot in UP Village, Diliman, Quezon City. In 1967, the construction of the first two buildings of the school (Xifré and Clotet) was supervised by Fr. Miguel Mialet, CMF. Fr. Santiago González, CMF was the first school director and principal.

Under Fr. Santiago's guidance, the school quickly grew to include the Intermediate Grade School Department in 1968 and the High School Department in 1972. In the 1970s the school upgraded the old covered court into a gymnasium, and the Immaculate Heart of Mary Parish church was built.

In 1981, González was replaced by Fr. Julián Mateos, CMF; Fr. Jesús Vásquez, CMF; Fr. Emilio Pablo, CMF; Fr. Luis Fernández Rey, CMF; and Fr. Domingo Moraleda, CMF. From 1981 until 1995, supervision of the school was transferred to Dr. Enrique Coralejo, a lay director.

The 1990 Luzon earthquake forced the school to make reinforcements to the main buildings. During the same decade, the Sala building was completed as the last of the five main buildings on the campus. The Vilaró and Fàbregas buildings were also built during the 1990s. From 1995 until 2000, Fr. Agapito Ferrero, CMF was the school director.

In 2000, Fr. Felimon P. Libot, CMF became the first Claretian priest of Filipino descent to be assigned as school director. He was superseded by Fr. Salvador G. Agualada, CMF in 2006.

In 2007, the school celebrated its 40th anniversary and the TLE building was completed.

In the middle of SY 2008–2009, Fr. Domingo Moraleda, CMF, former school director, died in an accident in Mabalacat, Pampanga.

On June 1, 2009, Fr. Eduardo C. Apungan, CMF took office as the school director. He was superseded in 2010 by Fr. Renato L. Manubag, CMF. In May 2013, Very Rev. Fr. Christian James L. Castro, CMF assumed directorship of the school. In 2016, Very Rev. Fr. Efrén Limpo, CMF assumed position as the 14th school director of Claret School of Quezon City. He was succeeded by Very Rev. Fr. Mauricio T. Ulep, the current school director.

The first elementary graduates completed their studies in 1971, while the pioneer high school class graduated in 1975 with 38 students. A plaque with the names of the first 38 high school graduates can be seen in the main lobby of Claret School.

On October 22, 2016, Claret School of Quezon City was honored with the Quezon City Manuel L. Quezon Gawad Parangal Award for Most Outstanding Institution for 2016 at the Crowne Plaza Galleria Hotel, Ortigas Avenue, Quezon City.

On February 5, 2022, Claret School of Quezon City's founder and first school director and principal, CMF. Fr. Santiago Gonzales had died.

== Organization ==
Claret School of Quezon City is composed of the Child Study Center, the Grade School Department and the High School Department. The Grade School and High School units were established in 1967, while the Child Study Center was opened in June 2001.

In the school year 2003–2004, the Association of Claret Schools in the Philippines, Inc. (ACSPI) was formally established and this further strengthened the linkages of the six Claret Schools in the Philippines: Claret School of Quezon City, Claret School of Zamboanga City, Claret College of Isabela City, Claret School of Lamitan City, Claret School of Maluso and Claret School of Tumahubong in Basilan Province.

== Sports ==
The Claret Red Roosters represent the school which is best noted for its football program. The football program was established in the late 1970s by Real Madrid fans and Roman Catholic priests Luis Rey and Santiago Gonzales.

Bob Salvacion who has been leading the Claret's football program set up the Claret Football Center in 1981. Claret is among the founding schools of the inter-school league Rizal Football Association (RIFA).

In 2011, Claret established a girls' football team despite being a boys' school. In 2025, Claret along with PAREF Southridge played as guest teams at the UAAP Season 87 high school football tournament.

On July 17, 2017, a non-infill artificial turf was installed within the campus.

== Notable alumni ==
=== Sports ===
- Mac Cuan - (GS '93, HS '97) former basketball player, De La Salle Green Archers; coach, San Miguel Alab Pilipinas and MPBL coach
- Japs Cuan - (GS '99) former basketball player, UST Growling Tigers; current assistant coach
- Anto Gonzales - (HS '99) former football player, Loyola Meralco Sparks F.C. and Philippines national football team; current head coach, UP Fighting Maroons men's football team (2009, 2011, 2012, 2016 and 2018 UAAP champion) and women's football team (2016 UAAP champion)
- Alfonzo Gotladera - (GS '06) former basketball player, De La Salle Green Archers and Ateneo Blue Eagles; current basketball player, San Miguel Beermen and Philippines men's national basketball team
- JC Intal - (GS '98/HS) former basketball player, Ateneo Blue Eagles; former basketball player, Phoenix Fuel Masters
- Raphael Enrico Mella - (HS '14) 3-time SEA Games gold medalist, poomsae/taekwondo
- Aris Caslib - (HS '85) Former Head Coach of Meralco Manila and head coach of San Beda University Red Booters
- Ariel Zerrudo - former football player, Philippines national football team; UP Fighting Maroons men's football team

=== Arts, media and entertainment ===
- Jules Guiang - (GS '05, HS '09) news anchor and TV host, People's Television Network; founder, board chairman, National Alliance of Youth Leaders
- Miko Manguba - (GS '08, HS '12) musician, Star Music, former artist of GMA Records and Top One Project

=== Military ===
- Gregorio Pio Catapang - (HS '77) Chief of Staff, Armed Forces of the Philippines

=== Others ===
- Reyancarlo Buan - architect, Araneta Center
- Richard "Richie" Fernando, SJ (+) - (HS) Jesuit missionary and Servant of God
- Bo Sanchez - (HS) Catholic Charismatic preacher; founder of the Light of Jesus Community.
