= Dionesa Tolentin =

Filipino footballer (born 2000)

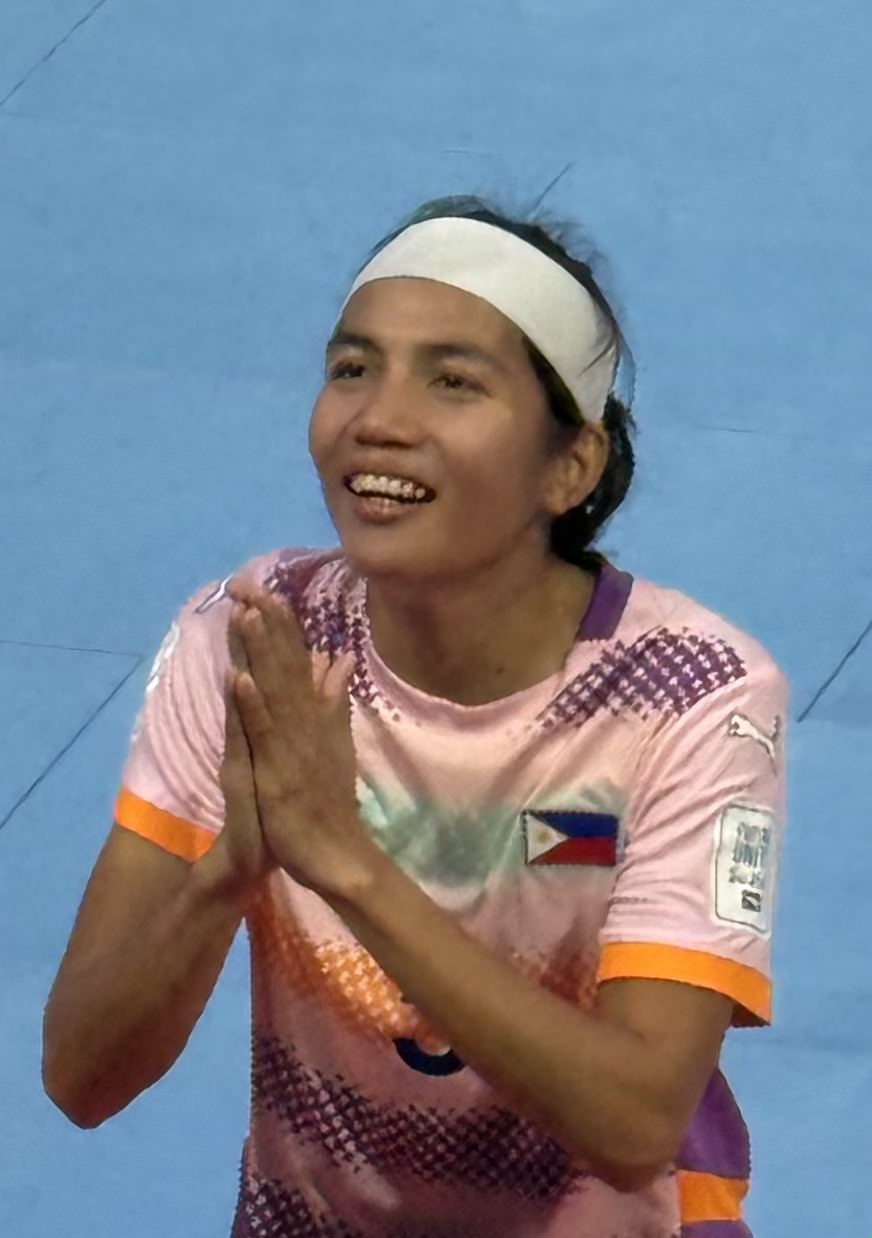
- Tolentin at the 2025 FIFA Futsal Women's World Cup

Personal information
- Date of birth: June 25, 2000 (age 26)
- Place of birth: Manukan, Zamboanga del Norte, Philippines
- Height: 5 ft 5 in (1.65 m)
- Position: Forward

Team information
- Current team: Kaya–Iloilo
- Number: 15

College career
Years	Team	Apps	(Gls)
2023–2024	Far Eastern University		

Senior career*
Years	Team	Apps	(Gls)
2024–	Kaya–Iloilo	5	(2)

International career^{‡}
2019–	Philippines	14	(2)
2025–	Philippines (futsal)	11	(5)
- * Club domestic league appearances and goals as of November 27, 2025 ‡ National team caps and goals as of September 25, 2026

Dionesa Tolentin (born June 25, 2000), also known as Inday, (Note: Inday is a Cebuano term meaning "young girl", often used as a term of endearment.) is a Filipino professional footballer who plays as a forward for PFF Women's League club Kaya–Iloilo and the Philippines national team. She also represents the country at the international level in futsal, co-captaining the team.

== Early life ==
Tolentin was raised in Manukan, Zamboanga del Norte. She grew up in a low-income household and began playing futsal in high school without access to proper equipment, often training barefoot. Her regular attendance at training sessions sometimes caused conflict at home, but she continued to participate in the sport. A Department of Education staff member discovered Tolentin and later supported her development by providing footwear and other necessities, which allowed her to remain active in school-level futsal. Tolentin later moved to Metro Manila and pursued a degree in education at the Far Eastern University.

== Career ==
=== College career ===
Tolentin played for the Lady Tamaraw Booters of the Far Eastern University (FEU), a team which also partook in the PFF Women's League. FEU won the 2022 PFF Women's Cup where Tolentin was named as the Most Valuable Player. She left FEU in December 2024, but not before helping the Tamaraws win the women's football title for UAAP Season 87. Overall she helped her team win three UAAP titles. She captained for her collegiate team. She also helped the team win the 2024 United Women's Invitational Football League.

=== Club ===
Tolentin has been part of Kaya–Iloilo as early as 2024. She was part of the club that took part at the 2024–25 AFC Women's Champions League. Tolentin helped the club win the 2025 season of the PFF Women's League. She added a third league title in the 2026 season. She also scored eight goals throughout the season, earning her the Golden Boot.

== International career ==
=== Football ===
Tolentin has played for the Philippine national team. She debuted at the 2019 AFF Women's Championship when it was still coached by Let Dimzon.

She made her return to the national team now under Mark Torcaso in February 2024 in a friendly against Finland.

She played at the 2025 ASEAN Women's Championship where she scored her first two international goals in the Philippines 7–0 opening win against Timor Leste.

=== Futsal ===
Tolentin was called up to become part of the Philippine national futsal team that took part at the 2025 AFC Women's Futsal Asian Cup qualifiers. She scored a goal in her women's futsal debut in the Philippines' 4–1 opener win against Kuwait. Tolentin was later called up to the squad for the 2025 FIFA Futsal Women's World Cup, the inaugural edition of the tournament hosted by the Philippines. During the team's second group-stage match, she scored the opening goal against Morocco from a free kick — the first-ever goal for the Philippines at a Futsal World Cup. However, Morocco came from behind to win 3–2.

== International goals ==
=== Football ===
No.	Date	Venue	Opponent	Score	Result	Competition
1.	August 7, 2025	Việt Trì Stadium, Phú Thọ, Vietnam	Timor-Leste	5–0	7–0	2025 ASEAN Women's Championship
2.	August 7, 2025	Việt Trì Stadium, Phú Thọ, Vietnam	Timor-Leste	6–0	7–0	2025 ASEAN Women's Championship

=== Futsal ===
No.	Date	Venue	Opponent	Score	Result	Competition	Ref.
1.	January 11, 2025	Yunusobod Sport Complex, Tashkent , Uzbekistan	Kuwait	3–0	4–1	2025 AFC Women's Futsal Asian Cup qualification	
2.	January 15, 2025	Yunusobod Sport Complex, Tashkent , Uzbekistan	Turkmenistan	2–0	2–0	2025 AFC Women's Futsal Asian Cup qualification	
3.	May 11, 2025	Hohhot Sports Centre, Hohhot, China	Hong Kong	1–0	3–7	2025 AFC Women's Futsal Asian Cup	
4.	November 8, 2025	La Ciudad del Fútbol, Las Rozas de Madrid, Spain	Spain	1–3	1–7	International Friendly	
5.	November 24, 2025	PhilSports Arena, Pasig, Philippines	Morocco	1–0	2–3	2025 FIFA Futsal Women's World Cup	
6.	December 13, 2025	Bangkokthonburi University Gymnasium, Bangkok, Thailand	Malaysia	1–0	3–1	2025 SEA Games	
7.	February 24, 2026	Terminal 21 Korat, Nakhon Ratchasima, Thailand	Myanmar	1–0	1–0	2026 ASEAN Women's Futsal Championship	

== Honors ==
FEU Lady Booters

- UAAP: 2023 (Season 85), 2024 (Season 86), 2024 (Season 87)

Individual

- PFF Women's Cup Most Valuable Player: 2022
- UAAP Golden boot: 2024 (Season 86)
- UAAP Most Valuable Player: 2024 (Season 86)
- UAAP Best striker: 2024 (Season 86)
