= Francis Tacardon =

Filipino footballer

Personal information
- Full name: Francis Arturo Palogan Tacardon
- Date of birth: September 30, 2001 (age 25)
- Place of birth: Quezon City, Philippines
- Position: Winger

Team information
- Current team: Champasak Avenir
- Number: 15

Youth career
- Claret School of Quezon City

College career
Years	Team	Apps	(Gls)
2020–2024	University of the Philippines		

Senior career*
Years	Team	Apps	(Gls)
2022–2024	Azkals Development Team	4	(0)
2024–2025	Loyola	17	(1)
2025	Mendiola 1991	8	(0)
2026–	Champasak Avenir	7	(2)

International career^{‡}
2019	Philippines U19	3	(1)
2022–2023	Philippines U23	1	(0)
- * Club domestic league appearances and goals as of 5:57, November 25, 2024 (UTC) ‡ National team caps and goals as of 5:57, November 25, 2024 (UTC)

Francis Arturo Palogan Tacardon (born September 30, 2001) is a Filipino professional footballer who plays as a winger for Lao League 1 club Champasak Avenir. He also played the Philippine under-23 national team.

== Personal life ==
During his high school days, Tacardon played football for Claret School of Quezon City. He played alongside his brothers, Florenz and Filbert, who were also his teammates during his college career at the University of the Philippines Diliman.

== Career ==
=== University of the Philippines ===
Tacardon made his debut for UP during UAAP Season 82, where he scored on his debut against Ateneo de Manila University in a 1–1 draw. However, his first year was cut short due to the season's cancellation as a result of the COVID-19 pandemic. As UAAP football resumed in 2022, Tacardon quickly became an important member of the UP Football Team, captaining them during his final season in 2024. During that season, Tacardon scored in the semi-final penalty shootout against UST to bring UP to the final, where they won the football championship for the first time since Season 80. Tacardon won the penalty that would lead to the only goal of the game.

In 2023, Tacardon and UP would also feature in the 2023 Copa Paulino Alcantara, a tournament composed mainly of professional and amateur clubs. Tacardon scored in UP's opening match against Manila Digger, and the team made it until the quarter-finals, where they were beaten by Kaya–Iloilo.

=== PFL career ===
While playing for UP, Tacardon was also playing for the Azkals Development Team of the Philippines Football League due to the break in college football. He played for the team during the 2022 Copa Paulino Alcantara, debuting in a 3–0 win over Mendiola 1991. 2 years later, after graduating, he would sign a pro contract with Loyola, where he made his debut in the starting XI as Loyola lost 4–1 to Maharlika Taguig.

== International career ==
=== Philippines U19 ===
In 2019, Tacardon received a call-up to the Philippine U19 national team for the 2019 AFF U-18 Youth Championship in Vietnam. He made his debut on the second matchday in a 4–1 loss against Myanmar, where he came on as a substitute for Carlo Dorin and scored the Philippines' consolation goal.

=== Philippines U23 ===
Tacardon would then receive a call-up to the Philippines U23 side in 2022 while playing for UP, representing the country at the 31st SEA Games, coming on as a substitute for Jovin Bedic in a 3–2 loss against Myanmar. He would later get called up to the squad again for the 2023 AFF U-23 Championship.

=== Philippines ===
While still competing in the UAAP, Tacardon and his college teammates Marc Tobias and Ramil Bation were called up by then-head coach of the Philippine national team Tom Saintfiet for a Manila-based training camp alongside local PFL players.
