= UST Growling Tigers basketball =

Intercollegiate men's basketball program

UST Growling Tigers
2026 UST Growling Tigers basketball team
- University: University of Santo Tomas
- Founded: 1920
- History: UST Glowing Goldies (1924–1992); UST Golden Tigers (1992–1993); UST Growling Tigers (1993–present)
- Head coach: Pido Jarencio
- Location: Manila
- Nickname: Growling Tigers
- Colors: Gold, black, and white

UAAP Champions
- 1939; 1940; 1946; 1947; 1948; 1949; 1951; 1952; 1953; 1955; 1959; 1964; 1968; 1993; 1994; 1995; 1996; 2006

NCAA Champions
- 1930

PCCL Champions
- 2012

The UST Growling Tigers basketball is the intercollegiate men's basketball program of the University of Santo Tomas. The school has won 19 basketball titles including one in the National Collegiate Athletic Association (NCAA). They are one of the winningest teams in the University Athletic Association of the Philippines (UAAP) with 18 championships, the last coming in 2006 during Pido Jarencio's rookie year of coaching. Jarencio returned as the team's head coach after ten years since resigning in 2013. He formally replaced Bal David on February 3, 2023.

== Schedule overview ==
The Growling Tigers' preparation for the season begins in late-March, or at the tail end of the academic year. It was recently moved to late-April following a shift in the opening of the school calendar from June to August. UST usually plays in two major preseason tournaments for two to three months and they sometimes join provincial pocket tournaments in the lead-up to the UAAP tournament. On many occasions, a Team B lineup from their training pool is fielded to competitions that run parallel to another tournament.

Among the offseason tournaments that the Growling Tigers participate in are the Filoil Flying V Preseason Cup, the MILCU U-25 Summer tournament, the Breakdown Basketball Invitational tournament, PBA D-League Aspirants' Cup and the Father Martin Cup.

In the 14-game UAAP basketball tournament, the Tigers play from twice to thrice weekly against the seven other member teams in the course of the two round-robin elimination games from early September until mid-November. Playoff games may last until December, after which the postseason tournaments begin.

In the postseason, UST usually qualifies to participate in the Philippine Collegiate Champions League, depending on their rank from the concluded UAAP season.

== History ==
The Growling Tigers were originally known as the "Glowing Goldies," with the name derived from UST's school colors of gold and white. Their colors were in turn inspired by the flag of the then defunct Papal States since their pontifical status was obtained in 1902.

=== Early years ===
The history of UST's basketball program dates back to 1920 when they joined the Liga Catolica, an interscholastic sports league of Manila-based Catholic schools that was founded by San Beda, La Salle, Ateneo, Letran, and San Vicente de Paul College.

The Glowing Goldies co-founded the NCAA in 1924, and under the guidance of Chito Calvo, they won their first and only championship in 1930. UST went undefeated in all of the 27 games that they played. It was the same year that the Big Three side tournament was formed. They defeated both the teams of National University and the University of the Philippines to capture the inaugural crown. They won against Ateneo in the NCAA championship game that went into overtime. At the end of regulation, the organizers were getting ready to announce the boys from Intramuros as the winners, but after rechecking the scores, it was discovered that it was actually tied at 47–all. In the end, UST prevailed, at 55–51.

UST men's basketball team—1930 NCAA champions
1 Silva ∙ 2 Heredia ∙ 3 Montinola ∙ 4 Del Rosario, C ∙ 5 Jacinto ∙ 6 Villanueva ∙ 7 Magbanua ∙ 8 Celis ∙ 9 Biel ∙ 10 Reyes ∙ 11 Bautista ∙ 12 Tudungca
Chito Calvo, coach

The Big Three was launched as an experimental sports meet among the triumvirate of UP, UST and NU, with the Goldies winning for four straight years behind the exploits of their three national team members in Jacinto Ciria Cruz, Primitivo Martinez, and Herminio Silva. It was formally inaugurated as a league in 1932—four years before the three schools formally withdrew their participation from the NCAA. Apart from the Big Three League, the Goldies also competed in the National Open Championship and tournaments organized by the Philippine Amateur Athletic Federation where they won titles in 1935, 1937, 1940, and 1941.

With the addition of Far Eastern University to the group in 1938, the Big Three League was dissolved and the UAAP was inaugurated. The Goldies lost to the Tamaraws in a game that decided the tournament's first champion. UST went on to record their first back-to-back championships in the next two years, although the 1939 crown was shared with FEU and UP when they all finished with identical 4–2 win–loss records. Silva, who had ventured into coaching after the 1938 season took over the Goldies after Dr. Jose Rodríguez resigned. The 1940 champion team became known to sports scribes as the "Captains' Team" due to the presence of five skippers in their lineup. Aside from then team captain Gabby Fajardo, the others who had served as the Goldies' leaders in past tournaments were Francisco Vestil, Salvador Siao, Enrique Novales, and Gabby's brother Fely who was a transferee from Letran.

=== Postwar era ===
The postwar resumption of the UAAP in 1946 after a five-year absence saw the Glowing Goldies record another undefeated season when they won all six of their games to claim their third straight championship. The team was honored in a ceremony on May 12, 1996 to commemorate the 50th year of the championship.

The following year, the Goldies were declared co-champions again with FEU. In the deciding match, UST was leading towards the end of regulation when a power outage struck the Rizal Memorial Coliseum, forcing play to stop. When power had not been restored after an hour, the tournament organizers decided to award the 1947 championship to both teams. Vestil was named Most Valuable Player of the season.

UST won over FEU again in 1949 for their sixth straight championship. It was their fourth straight title in the postwar era. The Tamaraws got their revenge when they defeated the Goldies for the UAAP, as well as the Intercollegiate championships in 1950.

UST Glowing Goldies—1946 UAAP champions
Benjamin Aranza ∙ Ramoncito Campos ∙ Antonio Castillejo ∙ Edward Dee ∙ Tito Eduque ∙ Pepito Genato ∙ Julian Malonso ∙ Pocholo Martinez ∙ Demosthenes Nagtalon
Francisco Nepomuceno ∙ Ricardo Pineda ∙ Felipe Tiongco ∙ Francisco Vestil
Herminio Silva, coach

UST Glowing Goldies—1947 UAAP champions
Ramoncito Campos ∙ Edward Dee ∙ Tony Dimayuga ∙ Tito Eduque ∙ Pepe Esteva ∙ Fely Fajardo ∙ Gabby Fajardo ∙ Pepito Genato ∙ Ramon Hechanova ∙ Julian Malonso
Pocholo Martinez ∙ Demosthenes Nagtalon ∙ Francisco Nepomuceno ∙ Francisco Vestil
Herminio Silva, coach

UST Glowing Goldies—1949 UAAP champions
Benjamin Coruña ∙ Ben Cruz ∙ Edward Dee ∙ Ding dela Paz ∙ Pepe Esteva ∙ Genaro Fernandez ∙ Pepito Genato ∙ Paing Hechanova ∙ Ramon Hechanova ∙ Ramon Manzano, C
Roque Miguel ∙ Alvin Paras ∙ Poy Yee
Herminio Silva, coach

Redemption came early for UST when they won the 1951 National Open Championships in January after defeating the San Miguel Braves team of their former coach Chito Calvo, 47–41 in the Finals. This was the last time that a team from the UAAP won the National Open. The Glowing Goldies went on to win their first unshared three-peat championship in the UAAP from 1951 to 1953. In the 1951 UAAP Finals, Coach Silva put into play his peculiar strategy of dribbling the ball until time ran out. UST preserved their lead over FEU and went on to win the championship on a 43–34 score. Ning Ramos was selected MVP by the Philippine Sportswriters Association in 1952. He was joined by teammate Ramon Manulat in the Mythical team selection.

The Goldies finished third behind FEU and first-time champions NU in 1954. Francis Wilson was included in the PSA's Mythical first team selection, while Eddie Pacheco made it to the second team.

In 1955, Fely Fajardo replaced longtime coach Herr Silva after the latter had fallen ill during his coaching stint at the 1954 World Championship in Brazil. UST was back to their winning ways when they dethroned NU for the UAAP title and then claimed the National Intercollegiate Championship in the postseason after beating University of the Visayas, 76–66. In the National Finals, the Goldies forced an overtime when team captain Andy Bautista converted both free throws to tie the score at 62–all. Wilson led the team in scoring with 21 points, while Jose Petel, Egie Serafico, and Benjamin Cabrera added 15, 12, and 10 points respectively.

UST Glowing Goldies—1951 UAAP champions
Francisco Bato ∙ Jose Buenaflor ∙ Benjamin Coruña ∙ Ding dela Paz ∙ Genaro Fernandez ∙ Baltazar Garcia ∙ Paing Hechanova, C ∙ Ramon Hechanova ∙ Ramon Manulat
Roque Miguel ∙ Ning Ramos ∙ Egie Serafico ∙ Poy Yee
Herminio Silva, coach

UST Glowing Goldies—1952 UAAP champions
Francisco Bato ∙ Andy Bautista ∙ Benjamin Cabrera ∙ Filemon Cober ∙ Napoleon Flores ∙ Baltazar Garcia ∙ Paing Hechanova ∙ Ramon Manulat ∙ Ning Ramos, C ∙ Egie Serafico
Jose Tapia Jr.
Herminio Silva, coach

UST Glowing Goldies—1953 UAAP champions
Francisco Bato ∙ Andy Bautista ∙ Filemon Cober ∙ Napoleon Flores ∙ Baltazar Garcia ∙ Paing Hechanova ∙ Ramon Manulat ∙ Jose Petel ∙ Ning Ramos, C ∙ Egie Serafico
Jose Tapia Jr. ∙ Francis Wilson ∙ Ludovico Yambao
Herminio Silva, coach

=== UST–UE rivalry ===
The Glowing Goldies met the University of the East's Warriors team in the 1957 Final, in what was to be their first of eight championship meetings that spans until the beginning of the 1970s decade. The Warriors joined the league as an expansion team in 1952 with Manila Central University, Adamson, and the University of Manila. UST lost the championship to UE, 55–64.

UST got back at UE in 1959 by breaking their back-to-back championship streak after winning, 66–55. The Goldies who won the first-round pennant struggled in the next round and had to go through a playoff game against FEU in order to qualify for the right to face the defending champions in the Finals. They defeated the Tamaraws, 84–67 and then went on to deploy a tight man-to-man defense against the Warriors in the championship game. They had succeeded in limiting UE's leading scorer Roehl Nadurata to only four points, all of which came from free throws. The 6-foot-3 Asencion Aparicio who hardly played long minutes was responsible for the defense on Nadurata. The Goldies' center was equally effective on the offensive end when he scored 20 points in the game. This was the 11th championship won by UST since their 1939 title. Valentino Rosabal won the 1959 Rookie of the Year award.

UST Glowing Goldies—1959 UAAP champions
Asencion Aparicio ∙ Reynaldo Arenas ∙ Jose Bacus ∙ Isabelo Capistrano ∙ Boy Codiñera ∙ Ramon Cotia ∙ Eduardo Cuyno ∙ Carlito Escobañez ∙ Priscilo Gabuya, C
Hermenegildo Isidro ∙ Rosendo Libunao ∙ Virgilio Nuñez ∙ Angel Pavilando ∙ Valentino Rosabal ∙ Romeo Tolentino
Fely Fajardo, coach

A loss to FEU in the four-team championship round prevented the Glowing Goldies from defending their championship. They made it to the semifinals by defeating the MCU Tigers, 87–72 in a playoff for the fourth and last berth where UE, FEU and UP had already qualified. FEU's Romy Diaz set a new scoring record when he tallied 40 points in ousting UST, 91–81 from the 1960 Finals.

In 1963, the UAAP introduced the twice-to-beat advantage format for the first time to replace their existing single-game, winner-take-all format to determine the champion of the season. UST defeated UE in two games, but the victory was placed under protest by the Warriors. The subject of the protest was UST's Tomas Pacheco's ineligibility for having played for a commercial team in the National Open in the summer, which was against league rules. The protest was upheld by the UAAP board, and as a result awarded the championship to UE. The Warriors also became the recipients of the El Oro trophy for having been champions for three straight years. Rosabal was named MVP, while point guard Aric del Rosario won the 1963 Rookie of the Year award.

UST did not have a promising start to their 1964 season. They lost to the University of the Visayas in the National Collegiate Championship in March and then Fajardo did not renew his contract with the team and decided to move to UP in September to be their new head coach. Sonny Reyes and Orly Bauzon, their team's top scorers moved on from the team and decided to play in the MICAA. Silva returned as their interim coach, but the Goldies still lost their opening game against UE, at 81–82. Things began to look up when Caloy Loyzaga, who had just retired as a player in April got on board to be the team's permanent head coach. The Goldies won their next games and got back at the Warriors with a close 58–57 win to qualify to the Finals against FEU. UST had erased the Tamaraws' twice-to-beat advantage and turned the championship into a best-of-three affair when they won, 61–60. Del Rosario scored all of his team's points to put the Goldies ahead at 60–55 from a 53–54 deficit. In the next game, FEU's Rolando Mojica scored 35 points to lead his team to a 69–58 win over UST to extend the Finals to a deciding third game. It was another close game with a series of one-point lead changes until the final ten seconds when the Goldies' Romeo Ramos was fouled by an FEU defender while driving to the basket. Ramos split his free throws to tie the score at 64–all as time ran out in regulation. UST managed to get the 71–68 overtime win and the championship. According to sports historian Jose Maria Escoda, newspapers at that time described the UST–FEU series as the most exhilarating matchup in the postwar history of the UAAP.

Championship head-to-head
No.	Year	Champion	Runner-up
1	1957	UE	UST
2	1959	UST	UE
3	1963	UE	UST (Note: UST's 1963 championship was overturned after UE's protest was upheld by the board)
4	1965	UE	UST
5	1966	UE	UST
6	1967	UE	UST
7	1968	Co-champions	
8	1971	UE	UST
9	1984	UE	UST
10	1985	UE	UST
Series: UE leads 9–2

The Goldies met UE again in the 1965 UAAP Finals. They prevented the Warriors from scoring a season sweep after winning their second-round game in overtime, at 74–70. They ended up tied at first place in the standings with identical 7-1 records. The Goldies won the first game of the best-of-three series, at 69–67 after Danny Florencio, their rookie forward out of FEATI University made back-to-back steals that were converted to baskets in the game's final seconds. The Warriors retaliated with a 72–65 win in Game 2 and then took the crown in the deciding third game of the series. Florencio erupted for 40 points but fouled out after committing two quick fouls on UE's Sonny Jaworski, the last coming in the final ten seconds of the game with the score tied at 84–all. The Warriors forced two turnovers on UST and scored the last four points for an 88–84 victory.

The lead-up to the 1966 season became a testament to the tenacity of the Goldies' rivalry with the Warriors when their National Collegiate game ended in a brawl. UST was trying to prevent UE from once again completing a sweep when in the last four seconds of the game, a ten-minute long fight broke out on the playing court. The game was stopped as the referees were unable to take control of the situation, with the Goldies trailing at 67–73. As a result of a hearing held by the Basketball Association of the Philippines, six players from both teams were each handed down a one-year suspension. UE's Jaworski, Nat Canson, Fernando Paseos, and UST's Florencio, team captain Manuel Tan, and Ceferino dela Paz were the recipients of the ban for throwing fists and elbows during the altercation. The penalties were later reduced to six months upon appeals by both schools, but the players would still miss the first month of the UAAP tournament which was set to start in August. The Warriors were awarded the National Collegiate championship, citing a rule that if the game is interrupted after the 35th minute, the team that had the lead is declared the winner. The two teams met again to contest the UAAP crown after finishing the elimination rounds with identical 6–2 records. The Goldies were swept in the best-of-three series, with the second game ending on a close 77–78 score.

Egie Serafico was appointed head coach after the 1966 season when Loyzaga resigned to assume coaching duties for the national team. UST faced the Warriors for the fourth straight year in the 1968 UAAP Finals. The series had been contested once again in a deciding third game, which took a strange turn at the start of the second half. Both Serafico and Baby Dalupan, coaches of the two opposing teams refused to be the first to submit to the game officials their list of their starting five prior to the tip-off. Even as the Glowing Goldies led by 11 points at 51–40 at halftime, their starters led by Bogs Adornado, Lawrence Mumar, and Cirilo Fabiosa were already in foul trouble. After repeated warnings to both teams, referee Antonio Esclabanan declared the game a no contest, citing the unsportsmanlike behavior of the two coaches. The league later recognized UST and UE as co-champions of the season.

The Goldies were once again runners-up to UE in 1971, after the Warriors went undefeated for two straight years. UST was the last team to try to prevent an 8–0 sweep in 1969 after all the other three teams lost to UE in the elimination games. The Goldies went unsuccessful and bowed to the Warriors, at 96–105. UE won two more games for a 10–0 sweep the following year, adding victories over the UAAP's sixth member, the Adamson Falcons who had been readmitted to the league that year.

UST Glowing Goldies—1964 UAAP champions
4 Romeo Ramos, C ∙ 5 Aric del Rosario ∙ 6 Bobby Salonga ∙ 7 Manuel Tan ∙ 8 Alfredo Reyes ∙ 9 Cristino Reynoso ∙ 10 Juanito Petel ∙ 11 Hector Hipolito ∙ 12 Rene Hawkins
13 Jaime Manalon ∙ 14 Ernesto Arcales ∙ 15 Fernando Lipata ∙ 16 Anselmo Briones ∙ 17 Ceferino dela Paz
Carlos Loyzaga, coach

UST Glowing Goldies—1968 UAAP champions
4 George Lizares ∙ 5 Manuel Veles ∙ 6 Lawrence Mumar ∙ 7 Maximo Laurel ∙ 8 Jesse Caimol ∙ 9 Andrew Malkinson ∙ 10 Remigio Concepcion ∙ 11 Alfonso Lao ∙ 12 Benjamin Arriola ∙ 13 Cirilo Fabiosa ∙ 14 Francisco Lorbes ∙ 15 Bogs Adornado ∙ 16 Amor Gonzales ∙ 17 Tommy Gutierrez
Egie Serafico, coach

In 1972, the Warriors were left out of the title picture after the FEU Tamaraws emerged as the tournament's dominant team. UST finished the eliminations at second place with a 7–3 record and had a twice-to-win disadvantage against FEU in the championship game. The game, which was held at Ateneo's Loyola Center on November 2 was headed for a blowout, with the Goldies trailing by 15 points, at 42–57 in the first half. They erupted with a 28–12 rally to seize the lead at 70–69 after the Tamaraws relaxed their defense. FEU's Fidel Que was able to fish Lito Maddela's second foul which sent him to the free throw line. Que converted both attempts to regain the upper hand, at 71–70. Giovanne Arceo missed his game-winning shot, with the rebound going to the Tamaraws' Roberto Concepcion who went for a coast-to-coast fast break to increase their lead to three, eventually giving FEU the win and the championship.

=== Cordero and Jarencio eras ===
Former UST forward Francis Wilson was appointed head coach in 1974, where the team struggled for two seasons. He was able to steer the Goldies to a third-place finish in 1976, but shortly after, rumors went around about their players' falling out with the coaching staff. This led to their veterans' departure to the MICAA. The 1977 roster was left with role players, with the exception of their third-year shooter Ray Obias who chose to stay. While the Glowing Goldies were no longer championship contenders, their rivalry with UE continued when the two teams battled towards the end of eliminations for fourth place in the standings. UST prevailed with a down-the-wire 76–75 win. They were actually leading at 76–72 with 43 seconds left in the game, but the Warriors scored three straight unanswered points. The Goldies weathered the uprising by keeping possession from the remaining five seconds until the buzzer. UST next defeated UP to prevent them from entering the Finals against FEU. Edmund Yee, Ricky Valero, and Danny Calsado led the Goldies with their balanced scoring, but it was the team's 18 steals that carried UST to victory. The Goldies ended up at fourth in the standings with 5 wins and 5 losses, while UE fell to fifth with a 4–6 record.

Serafico came back to replace Wilson as UST's coach in 1978. He had laid out a two-year rebuilding plan to bring the team back into title contention. The Glowing Goldies had again become UE's adversary when they met in 1979 for the playoff that would determine FEU's opponent in the Finals. Both teams ended the eliminations with a 9–3 record. UST came out on top with a 114–104 win and dethroned the Warriors, who held the 1978 title. Yee led in scoring with 34 points, but it was his collaboration with Ed Cordero and Frank Natividad that gave the team the win. The three combined for 28 points in an eight-minute stretch to surmount UE's 60–45 lead in the second half. Serafico's program saw an early success with the Goldies' entry to the Finals. UST's offense was anchored mainly on Cordero, the team's center who had set a scoring record when he finished with 54 points against Adamson in the first round. He later revealed that he had been nursing a fever prior to the playoff game against UE. His condition worsened and was hospitalized after the game, making him unavailable to play in the championship where FEU held a twice-to-beat advantage. Natividad and Yee took up the scoring cudgels, finishing with 38 and 25 respectively, but they were soundly beaten, 89–100. The team trailed FEU at the half, 27–51.

Like in 1969, the Goldies were again faced with the task of preventing an automatic championship by a rival team. FEU went undefeated in 11 games and their last scheduled match in the two round-robin eliminations of the 1980 season was against UST. Cordero, who was still the go-to-guy of the team was supported in their starting lineup by Edgar Bilasano, Louis Cu, Nestor Lugue, and Paquito Maristela. Maristela had replaced the already graduated Yee at the forward position. The 6-foot-4 Cesar Calayag alternated with Lugue in guarding Anthony Williams, their opponent's high-scoring American forward. The Goldies who had trailed FEU at 37–42 at the half opened up a rally led by rookie Raymond Fran to put the team to within two at 49–51. The lead changes went back and forth until the 69–70 count, with UST trailing. Both teams went scoreless in the next three minutes until Cu and the Tamaraws' Jojo Valle traded baskets to up the score to 71–72 with 34 seconds left in the game. A botched play off the Goldies' last timeout caused the team a 30-second violation. In the next play, FEU held on to the ball until the buzzer sounded and were declared champions of the season. Serafico later resigned and was replaced by Eddie Pacheco, another former Goldie as the team's head coach.

Pido Jarencio set the scoring record for the season in 1982 when he compiled 50 points in their 116–93 win over NU in the first round. The team opened their season with an 82–91 loss to Adamson with Jarencio top scoring for 15 points. Charlie Badion, who led Mapúa to the 1981 NCAA championship replaced Pacheco as coach of the Glowing Goldies. UST had the chance to qualify to the 1983 Finals when they tied UP at second place at the end of eliminations with an 8–4 record. They defeated the Maroons both times in the eliminations, with the second-round game ending at 76–71. UP got payback by beating the Goldies in the playoff for the second Finals slot, with an 87–85 win. Jarencio was selected to the Mythical team that year.

The 1984 UAAP Finals was a best-of-three series, where the Glowing Goldies were once again facing UE. UST won in Game 2, behind Jarencio's 34 points to avenge their Game 1 loss to the Warriors. The Goldies kept up with UE's offense until the first five minutes of the second half when the Warriors started to shift gears for a 112–99 win to clinch the championship. Jarencio and UE's Allan Caidic, front runners in the MVP race turned the game into a shooting contest by scoring 48 and 46 points respectively. Jarencio, who was hobbled with four fouls from as early as the 22nd minute failed to get support from his teammates as he scored most of their points in the second half. The Goldies trailed by as much as 19 points late in the game. They had defeated UE in both games of the elimination rounds.

The Goldies and the Warriors met again in the 1985 UAAP Finals. The two teams were on equal footing as UE topped the first round with a 5–1 record, while the Goldies became the tournament's number 1 seed with 9 wins against 3 losses. UE's lone loss in the first round was against the Glowing Goldies with Jarencio scoring a season high of 43 points. The Warriors defeated FEU in a playoff for the second-seed qualifier and then handily defeated UST in two games to crown themselves as champions for the second straight year.

=== Player migration ===
In 1987, the Glowing Goldies had to drop their top scorer Bennett Palad and big man Rabbi Tomacruz from the roster due to academic deficiencies. Tomacruz had failed to enroll in time for the submission of the lineup, making him ineligible for the season. Sophomore recruits Fedencio Oblina, and Rohimust Santos Jr. stepped up in place of Palad and Tomacruz. After placing fourth at the end of the first round, UST won back-to-back games to move up to a tie for third place at the standings. It was then that officials of Adamson filed a protest against one of their players. The UAAP Board found Oblina to be ineligible for failing his NCEE qualifying tests which resulted to the reversal of four of UST's won games. The Glowing Goldies dropped to 7th place in the standings at 2–7 from their original 6–3 record. Aric del Rosario sat out in their next game and was replaced by then coach of the women's team Orly Bauzon. Oblina was eventually handed a lifetime ban by the UAAP. The Goldies ended the season with 3 wins against 11 losses.

Bauzon formally replaced Del Rosario as the Goldies' head coach for the 1988 season. Palad was excluded from the roster for the second straight year for having exceeded the five-year playing limit in the UAAP. The league counted his participation in the PABL in 1987 as a playing year despite his absence from the UAAP. To add to the team's woes, starting point guard Alfrancis Chua left the team in the first round of eliminations after a misunderstanding with a member of the coaching staff. Chua's decision to leave was finalized after a meeting with Bauzon and PE director Fr. Franklin Beltran. UST ended their season at seventh place for the second year with the same 3–11 record.

1989 saw a shakeup in UST's basketball program when the nucleus of their high school basketball team made a surprising transfer to rival Adamson in the summer. The Golden Nuggets, regarded as the tallest basketball team in the country with their 6-foot-11 team captain EJ Feihl, 6-foot-8 Marlou Aquino, and 6-foot-6 Giovanni Pineda in the lineup had lost Aquino, Pineda, Manuel Cucio, and Gerard Hipolito in the transfer. Joining the junior players were Nuggets' head coach Hector Hipolito and assistant coach Charlie Dy, as well as Bauzon and second-year Goldie Bong dela Cruz, who was also a former Golden Nugget. Reports say that the exodus was caused by a rift between the school's administration and the coaching staff.

The Glowing Goldies made a turnaround in 1990 from their dismal 2-win season in 1989. They won eight straight games, with one coming from a reversal of their 10-point first round loss to La Salle after Green Archer Noli Locsin was declared ineligible by the board. The strong start was partly attributed to the presence of Feihl, their now 7-foot-tall rookie center. Feihl unfortunately fell ill in the middle of the season and UST went on to lose all their remaining games for an 8–6 record and a tie at fourth place with FEU in the standings.

Despite Feihl's transfer to Adamson in 1991, the Goldies had a winning season, where they began their UAAP campaign on a five-game winning streak. They defeated FEU, 114–84 on opening day and went on to beat Ateneo, NU, and Adamson in their next games. They trailed the Falcons by more than ten points at the half, but made a comeback to win, 103–101. Their next match against UE also yielded a close 74–72 win before suffering back-to-back losses to close out the first round at second place with a 5–2 record. They won all but one game in the second round with an 80–85 loss to La Salle. They ended up tied with FEU at second place with an 11–3 record. They lost by six points to the Tamaraws in the playoff to determine La Salle's opponent in the Finals on an 89–95 score. The Goldies had complained of spotty officiating in the game, which at one point in the second half resulted to a 20-minute debris-pelting protest from the stands. The game, though, had not been close with FEU leading by as much as 23 points, and even as the Goldies were able to limit them to only two points coming from free throws in the last three and a half minutes, they were only able to come within nine points. The Goldies were also outrebounded by their opponents, 23–35. Dennis Espino, who made it to the Mythical selection top scored for UST with 23 points.

=== The Growling Tigers ===
As hosts of the 1992 tournament, UST unveiled a new mascot during the opening ceremonies following a change in their varsity moniker from the "Glowing Goldies" to the "Tigers". The move behind the renaming of the team was recalled in a 2007 speech by returning rector Fr. Rolando dela Rosa when he first assumed the position in 1991. Because the Goldies literally represented the gold and white school colors, UST never had a mascot for their varsity teams. The Tiger was chosen after Dela Rosa instructed Bro. Rolando Atienza, UST's PE moderator to come up with an appropriate mascot.

For the second time in UAAP history, the Golden Tigers met FEU in a game that was interrupted by a power outage. Prior to the game, UST was tied with the Tamaraws at first place with a 10–2 record. They lost to La Salle, 80–82 and FEU lost to Adamson, resulting to a quadruple tie among the four teams with 10–3 records. In the Tigers' last game in the eliminations, power went out at the Loyola Center with 3:47 remaining in the game and with UST trailing, 56–68. The officials decided to reschedule the last three minutes of the game on a later date. UST ended up losing, 76–87 and settled for fourth place with 10 wins against 4 losses. Team captain Udoy Belmonte and Rey Evangelista were chosen to the Mythical first team, while Espino made it to the second team.

=== 14–0 season ===
In 1993, the UAAP implemented the Final Four semifinal playoffs format to replace the outright Finals series between the top two teams. The Tigers started their season with a 27-point blowout win over Ateneo and then went on to have easy wins in their next three games, including a 31-point rout of NU. Their next game against FEU was once again marred by a power failure when they played at the Araneta Coliseum, though the game was finished after a long delay with UST prevailing, 78–66. The team had been winning their games consistently that even when Aric del Rosario failed to show up in their match against NU due to a scheduling conflict, they were still able to win by 17 points. The Final Four was negated as the Tigers went on to sweep all 14 of their games and were declared automatic champions. Espino, who was declared MVP made it to the Mythical selection with teammates Evangelista and Patrick Fran. Belmonte was selected to the Mythical second team.

=== UST–La Salle rivalry ===
The Growling Tigers met La Salle in the 1994 UAAP Finals for the first time since their overtime loss in the 1948 National Open championship game. The Green Archers joined the league as the UAAP's eighth member in 1986 under controversial circumstances. The school first applied for membership in 1981 but was denied when three of the seven-member schools voted against their acceptance due to the violent reputation brought about by their recent championship game in the NCAA. UST was among those that voted out La Salle. The school managed to get two-thirds of votes in their favor in 1985, paving the way to their entry to the UAAP.

Championship head-to-head
No.	Year	Champion	Runner-up
1	1994	UST	La Salle
2	1995	UST	La Salle
3	1996	UST	La Salle
4	1999	La Salle	UST
5	2013	La Salle	UST
Series: UST leads 3–2

Even with Adamson's suspension in 1994, the Tigers still struggled and could only manage to land at fourth place at the end of the first round with 3 wins against 3 losses. They turned the season around by winning five games including four straight in the second round for an 8–4 record that was good for third place and a spot in the Final Four playoffs. The Tigers also denied La Salle a season sweep when they won, 68–66 in the second round to also avenge their 73–83 loss in the previous round. They overcame UE's twice-to-beat advantage in the semifinals and had to force a deciding Game 3 in the Finals against La Salle to win their third back-to-back title since the 1948–49 and 1952–53 seasons. The Tigers also helped to achieve the UAAP's first and only triple championship after the Tiger Cubs and the Tigresses earlier won the titles in their respective divisions. Espino was named season MVP for the second straight year.

UST met La Salle and won the championship two more times in 1995 and 1996 for their second four-peat since the 1946–49 seasons. They topped the 1995 eliminations with an 11–3 record, but like in 1994, they had to beat the Archers in three games to win the title. They also struggled to defeat their Finals opponent in the second round by overcoming two overtime periods for an 87–84 win. They came in at second behind La Salle in the standings after the eliminations with a 10–4 record but were able to sweep them in the best-of-three Finals. With the 1996 title, the Tigers became the second winningest team in the UAAP behind UE after claiming their 17th title. Chris Cantonjos won the 1995 MVP award, while Estong Ballesteros was selected to the 1996 Mythical team.

The Growling Tigers met the Green Archers yet again, but this time in the 1997 Final Four playoffs. UST held the twice-to-beat advantage, even as the two teams split their two round-robin elimination games and finished with identical 10–4 records due to the Tigers' superior +5 quotient over the Archers. UST lost in two games, with Game 2 going into overtime at 72–74.

After winning, 80–72 against UP in the playoff for the fourth semifinal slot, the Tigers faced the top-seeded Green Archers again for their 1998 Final Four match. They lost in two games after taking Game 1 with a 55–51 win.

The Growling Tigers made it back to the Finals in 1999 and went up against La Salle for the fourth time since 1994. UST featured a rookie-laden roster, but among them were four junior MVPs in Alwyn Espiritu, Derick Hubalde, Marvin Ortiguerra, and Emmerson Oreta. They won their first ten games and ended up tied at first place in the standings with La Salle at 11–3. It was their second-best start since winning 17 straight from the 1993–94 seasons. The Tigers' second-round game against Ateneo had to be stopped after the referees failed to control the players' physicality which resulted to a melee at the Cuneta Astrodome. UST was leading, 50–46 before the stoppage. The last quarter of the game was continued a week later in a closed-door match at the Lyceum Gym. The Tigers ended up losing to Ateneo, 60–63. A playoff to determine the number one seed in the Final Four was played between UST and La Salle, which the Tigers lost, sending them to again face the third-seeded Ateneo. They won a by a single point, at 75–74 to advance to the Finals. The championship series went down to a deciding Game 3, and the Tigers had the chance to win in regulation, with a two-point lead. UST's Gilbert Lao was fouled with 15 seconds remaining and split his free throws for a three-point, 67–64 advantage. La Salle's Dino Aldeguer then converted a three-point shot to send the game into overtime. The Archers went on to win, 78–75.

=== 2000s ===
UST opened their 2000 season with a 54–65 loss against FEU but bounced back with four straight wins. They then suffered back-to-back losses to end the first round with a 4–3 record in a tie for fourth place with UE. The team's inconsistency carried over to the second round and brought them the same fourth-place result at 8 wins and 6 losses for another tie with UE, who they defeated in the playoff for the fourth semifinal slot, at 65–61. They once again lost to the number one-ranked La Salle in the Final Four, at 62–65. The Tigers fell to a 0–11 scoring drought near the end of the first half for a 32–39 score. Derick Hubalde shot three straight three-pointers to come within three at 62–65 in the last 1:03 of the game. He was also able to force a La Salle turnover by stealing off Mon Jose, however, he failed to pass to the unguarded Cyrus Baguio and opted to take the shot himself. Hubalde missed a game-tying three to hand La Salle the win and were again eliminated from the Finals for the third time since 1997.

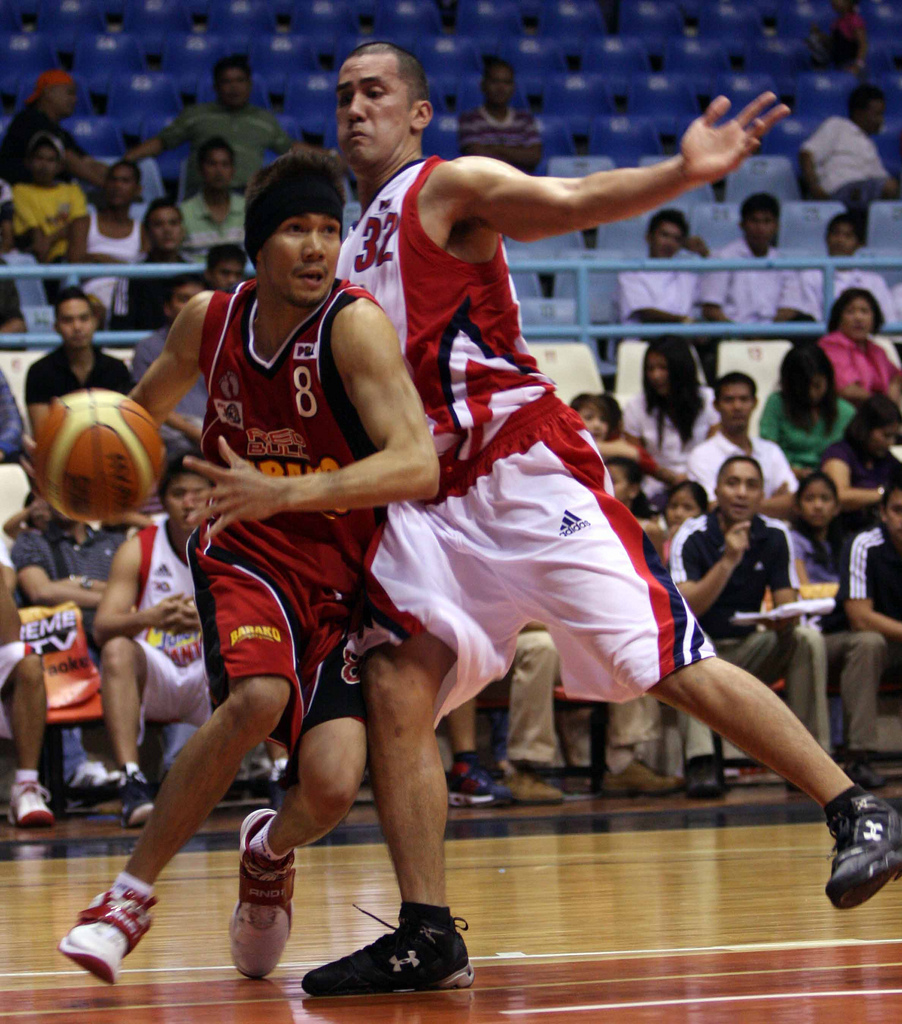
Cyrus Baguio (pictured left) played for the Growling Tigers from 1998 until 2002

The departure of key players caused the Growling Tigers to miss the Final Four for the first time in 2001 since the implementation of its format in 1993. Ortiguerra had already turned professional, while Baguio and Lao were dropped from the roster due to academic deficiencies. They started the season on a four-game losing streak and ended the first round in a tie with UP at sixth place with a 2–5 record. The Tigers' back-to-back wins over Adamson and the front-running Ateneo to start the second round gave the team a resurgence at the Final Four, but they went on to lose crucial games against NU, La Salle and FEU. They ended the season at sixth place with 6 wins and 8 losses, topped by a 76–72 win over UE. Warren de Guzman was selected to the All-rookie team at the awarding ceremonies.

With Cyrus Baguio back in the lineup for the 2002 season, the Growling Tigers also returned to the Final Four. UST qualified to the semifinals despite losing to the second-seeded UE on the last game of the eliminations to finish at fourth place with an 8–6 record. They lost to La Salle once again in the Final Four, but the season for the Tigers had been promising after finishing as runners-up in the Ambrosio Padilla Cup in the summer and as semifinalists in the Father Martin Cup. They also qualified to participate in the Collegiate Champions League in the postseason.

Aric del Rosario stepped down as head coach at the end of the 2003 season after the Growling Tigers ended up in a tie for fifth place with a 5–9 record. They won their last game of the eliminations over UP in overtime, at 92–89.

Nel Parado replaced Del Rosario as interim coach beginning in the postseason when UST participated in the 2003 PBL Platinum Cup. Their respectable showing in the tournament earned Parado a nod and a permanent tenure from the school's Institute of the Physical Education and Athletics. The Growling Tigers were off to a fair start in their 2004 UAAP campaign as they ended the first round tied at third place with La Salle and UE with a 4–3 record. UST, however failed to win a single game in the second round to finish the season at seventh place with a 4–10 record.

The Growling Tigers broke their 1989 record for their worst start when they went winless on their first five games to open the 2005 season. Their 12-game losing streak which began at the start of the second round of the previous season ended with their 107–100 overtime win over the NU Bulldogs. NU got back at UST with a 74–73 second round win for their first and only victory of the season. The Tigers ended the elimination rounds with the same 4–10 record from 2004, but on a higher rank at sixth place above Adamson and NU. The lone highlight of their campaign was when they stopped Ateneo's seven-game win streak in the second round by winning, 77–73. It was a turnaround for the team after placing third in the Father Martin Cup and winning the PRISAA tournament in the offseason. Jervy Cruz, who was a member of their training pool won the PRISAA MVP award. He was set to play his first year in the UAAP, but was pulled out of the roster due to academic deficiencies.

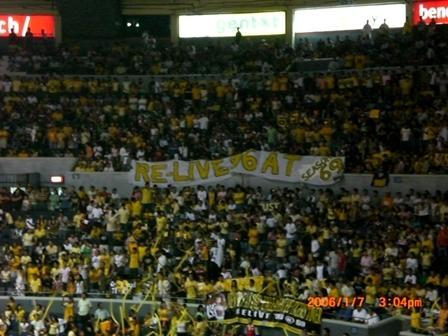
"Re-live '96 at Season '69!" The Thomasian crowd at the deciding game of the Season 69 men's basketball Finals

When Parado's contract expired in February 2006, UST hired Pido Jarencio, their former star player who had made a name for himself in the Philippine Basketball Association. Jarencio, though, had no prior coaching experience which made critics question the school's decision to choose him as Parado's replacement. This observation was made evident when the Tigers went 2–4 in the first round of eliminations of the 2006 season. The teams had played one less game in each of the rounds with the absence of La Salle due to their suspension for the season. Things began to turn around for UST in their third game in the second round when they defeated the NU Bulldogs, 75–67 to end a four-game losing streak and improve their record to 3–5 and move to a tie for fourth place with Adamson and NU. The Tigers went on a three-game winning streak, the last of which was an 88–80 overtime win over league-leading Ateneo to snap the Blue Eagles' undefeated record and avenge their 78–114 blowout loss in the first round. UST defeated Adamson, 77–74 in their last game of the eliminations to tie the Falcons at third place with a 6–6 record. They defeated Adamson again in the playoff for the number three seed prior to the Final Four pairings. In defeating the second-seeded UE Red Warriors, the Growling Tigers became the fifth team in the history of the UAAP Final Four to advance to the Finals with a twice-to-beat disadvantage. They had reached the Finals for the first time since the 1999 playoff games. UST captured the UAAP title in three games after a 76–74 overtime win against Ateneo for their 18th championship in the league. Jojo Duncil was named Finals MVP, while Jarencio was hailed Coach of the Year. Cruz was earlier selected to the Mythical team during the ceremony for the individual awards.

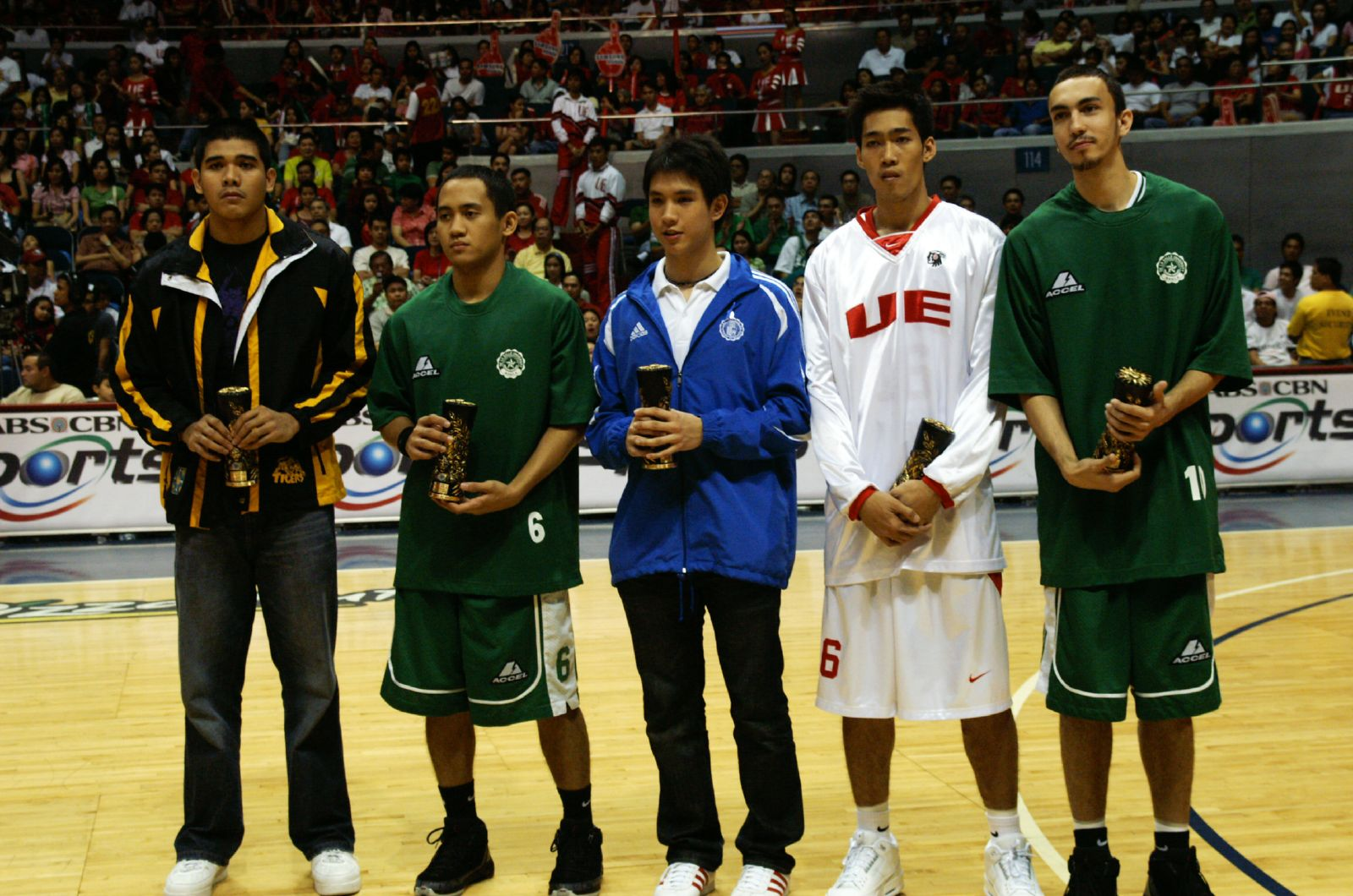
Jervy Cruz (leftmost) won the 2007 UAAP MVP award

UST failed to defend their championship after getting eliminated in the 2007 playoffs. The Tigers, who ended up tied at fourth place with FEU at the end of eliminations with an 8–6 record, were looking to qualify to the stepladder semifinals after UE went undefeated and automatically qualified to the Finals. They defeated the Tamaraws in a playoff for the remaining semifinal slot where their opponents were limited to just six points in the second quarter. They then lost their knockout game against the third-seeded Ateneo Blue Eagles, 64–69 in the first round of the stepladder semifinals, signifying the end of their UAAP season. Jervy Cruz, who topped the statistical points tally was named season MVP.

The Tigers missed the playoffs for the fifth time in the last eight years when they ended the 2008 season at fifth place with a 6–8 record. Cruz was selected to the Mythical team for the third straight year.

Despite winning only six games, the Growling Tigers had qualified to the Final Four after the NU Bulldogs defeated and eliminated La Salle at the end of the 2009 eliminations. UST finished the first round with 4 wins against 3 losses but only managed to win two games in the second round. The Adamson Falcons had the same 4–3 record in the first round, but fared worse by winning only a single game in the next round. La Salle had a chance to overtake UST had they won over NU due to a superior +13 quotient over the Tigers. UST lost to defending champions Ateneo, 64–81 in their Final Four match. Team captain Dylan Ababou was named MVP and scoring leader of the season, while Jeric Teng won the Rookie of the year award.

=== 2010s ===
In what was Jarencio's worst win–loss record as coach in the UAAP, the Growling Tigers ended their 2010 season at seventh place with a 4–10 record. UST placed fifth after the first round of eliminations with a 3–4 record but were only able to secure a single win in the next round. Except for their opening game against the UE Red Warriors where they won by 13 points, the scores of the rest of their wins were from close-scoring matches, including their first round match against UP which went into overtime.

The Growling Tigers who celebrated their quadricentennial year in 2011 made it back to the Final Four after finishing the eliminations at fourth place with an 8–6 record. They were beaten anew by the four-peat seeking Ateneo Blue Eagles in their playoff game, 66–69. UST had trailed Ateneo by ten points in the last three minutes of the game but were able to bring the lead down to three with five seconds remaining. Jeric Fortuna missed a three-point attempt to end the game in defeat.

UST made it back to the Finals in 2012 after defeating the NU Bulldogs, who qualified to the Final Four for the first time in 11 years. The Tigers finished second at the end of eliminations with a 10–4 record but were swept in their championship series by the Ateneo Blue Eagles, making their opponents five-peat champions of the tournament. Karim Abdul was selected to the Mythical team during the awarding ceremony for individual players. UST won the Philippine Collegiate Champions League title in the postseason after beating Ateneo in a three-game series. Teng was named tournament MVP.

The Growling Tigers reached the Finals again and faced the La Salle Green Archers for the first time since their 1999 championship series. Their 73–72 Game 1 win snapped the Archers' nine-game winning streak. La Salle went on to win the next two games to bag the 2013 championship. UST made it to the Finals when they defeated the NU Bulldogs in the Final Four with a twice-to-win disadvantage and became the first fourth-ranked team in UAAP history to eliminate the top seed in a playoff series.

Jarencio resigned in January 2014 after accepting an offer to coach in the PBA. His assistant coach Bong dela Cruz, who was also a former Glowing Goldie was appointed as his replacement. With their key players falling to injuries and the unfamiliarity of a new system, the Growling Tigers failed to advance to the 2014 semifinals. They finished the season on a four-game losing streak to place sixth with a 5–9 record. Karim Abdul made it to the Mythical team for the third straight year. The team had a successful preseason with their runner-up finish in the Father Martin Cup in the summer.

UST made it to the Finals for the third time in four years after defeating the 2014 champions, the NU Bulldogs in the Final Four. NU has been the Tigers' semifinal opponent for the third time in the last four years. The Growling Tigers became the fifth team in UAAP history to reach the Finals after missing the playoffs in the previous season. FEU defeated UST in three games to win their 20th championship and their first after a decade. The Tigers who were facing FEU in the Finals for the first time since 1979 won both games against them in the eliminations. Kevin Ferrer and Ed Daquioag were selected to the Mythical team during the presentation of awards for Season 78.

Another former Glowing Goldie was tapped to be the new head coach of the Growling Tigers beginning in the 2016 season. Controversies hounded the team immediately after the 2015 season ended which prompted Dela Cruz to step down and be replaced by Boy Sablan, who was a teammate of Jarencio in the 1980s. The ill-prepared Tigers who lost Ferrer, Daquioag, and Abdul to graduation only managed to win three games to record their worst win–loss record in the Final Four era.

The Tigers sank further when they almost went winless in 2017. The team went on a 17-game losing streak that dated back from the second round of the previous season. Their lone win has become UST's worst record, eclipsing their 2–12 season in 1989 and causing Sablan's termination of contract at the end of the year.

When champion coach Aldin Ayo announced his resignation from La Salle in December 2017, talks of his transfer to UST went abuzz. He eventually confirmed his appointment in January through a post on his social media account. During the elimination rounds, the Tigers' key players suffered injuries with Steve Akomo getting a concussion and CJ Cansino tearing his left ACL, causing both to bow out of the 2018 season. They were fourth in the standings at one point during the second round, but they lost all four of their remaining games to crash out of the Final Four and finish sixth with a 5–9 record.

The Growling Tigers overcame two semifinal do-or-die matches to reach the 2019 Finals against the undefeated Ateneo Blue Eagles. They ended the eliminations having the same 8–6 record of FEU but were ranked lower at fourth place due to an inferior -6 quotient. They defeated the Tamaraws, 81–71 in a knockout match and then took down the second-seeded UP Fighting Maroons in two games in the second stage of the stepladder playoffs. They were then swept by Ateneo in their best-of-three championship series. Soulémane Chabi Yo was named season MVP, while Mark Nonoy won the Rookie of the Year award.

=== 2020s ===
When news broke out on August 20, 2020 that Cansino had been kicked out of the team, it was revealed that the Tigers' players and staff had been quartered in Sorsogon since June, while lockdowns have been in effect due to the government-imposed COVID-19 restrictions. Ayo resigned amid ongoing investigations on possible health protocols and quarantine violations that may have been committed by the group. Former Growling Tiger Jino Manansala was appointed interim coach in place of Ayo. In the aftermath, 12 of the 16 players from the 2019 team transferred to other schools, with Cansino going to UP, the trio of Rhenz Abando, Brent Paraiso and Ira Bataller to Letran, and Mark Nonoy and Deo Cuajao to La Salle. Tiger Cub center JB Lina withdrew his commitment to play for the Tigers' seniors team and proceeded to enroll at UP.

The UAAP Board announced the cancellation of Season 83 on December 11, 2020. It marked the first time since World War II that an entire season is cancelled by the league. Season 82 was also cut short with the similar cancellation of the games in the second semester of the academic year due to the extended community quarantine from the COVID-19 pandemic.

The belatedly-run 84th season of the UAAP began in the second semester of the 2021–22 school year in March 2022, and even as training and preparations for the tournament had been ongoing since Manansala took over the team in October 2020, the composition of their roster could not immediately be finalized due to player transfers. Reigning MVP Soulémane Chabi Yo left the team in November 2021 after the announcement of the cancellation of Season 83. He decided to join a semi-professional team in the Liga EBA in Spain.

The 2021 squad won only three games and were riddled with blowout losses throughout the season, as they ended the tournament on a six-game losing streak. Their 50-point defeat at the hands of the Ateneo Blue Eagles, in particular, broke the league's record for the largest losing margin since recordkeeping has been automated in 2003.

Manansala's assistant coaches, led by McJour Luib tendered their resignation at the end of the tournament. The futile efforts to reinstate former coach Aldin Ayo played a big role in the coaching staff's departure. Manansala, meanwhile, was reassigned to coach the school's high school program, as rumors of a corporate backer taking over team management began circulating around the sporting community.

The IPEA announced in July 2022 the appointment of former Growling Tiger and PBA player Bal David as the team's new head coach. With sporting events all around going back to normal, UST participated in the preseason tournaments by joining the PBA D-League and Filoil. Manansala and former Tiger Cubs coach Albert Alocillo served as interim coaches to the two tournaments as they were transitioning to a new system under David.

Even as the Tigers fared well in the preseason, they were waylaid by the decommitment of their prized recruits. Filipino American Gani Stevens, who was recruited in April 2022 made a surprise transfer to the UE Red Warriors' camp in August and Kean Baclaan, their high-scoring point guard decided to leave for the NU Bulldogs. The team's lineup was further depleted after veterans Sherwin Concepcion and Bryan Santos were both ruled ineligible by the UAAP for having exceeded the league's age limit. With seven new players in the roster, the Tigers won only one game in the 2022 season. After winning their opening game against the Adamson Falcons, UST went on a 13-game losing streak to match their 2017 record for the fewest games won in the team's history. At the end of the elimination rounds, Nic Cabañero and Adama Faye led the league in scoring and rebounds with averages of 17.6 points and 12.2 rebounds per game respectively.

The Tigers' losing streak continued onto their 2023 season, when they opened the first round of eliminations with six straight losses. Their 19 consecutive defeats have surpassed their worst record for the longest winning drought of 17 back in 2017. Their season ended early again after finishing with a 2–12 record. Faye, who was again the team's foreign student-athlete, played limited minutes in their opening game against UE and had to sit out after complaining of back pains. He left the roster midway in the season to fly back to his home country in Senegal. Cabañero once again led the league in scoring with an average of 16.8 points per game. He was ranked 8th in the players' MVP tally with 60.1 statistical points at the end of the second round of eliminations.

David earlier stepped down after only a six-month tenure, paving the way for Jarencio's return as the Growling Tigers' head coach. With him came the long-awaited entry of one of Philippine basketball's corporate powerhouse, San Miguel Corporation as the team's main sponsor and backer.

The Growling Tigers made it back to the Final Four of the 2024 season for the first time since 2019, with the past year's recruitment paying dividends. Transferees Forthsky Padrigao and Kyle Paranada solved their point guard problems, which the team lacked in the past three seasons. They also found an able replacement for their foreign student-athlete in Malian center, Mo Tounkara, who led the team in rebounds with an average of 10.2 per game. Padrigao led the league in assists with 6.1 per game, and Cabañero finally cracked the Mythical team on his fourth season with the Tigers.

UST reached the Final Four again in 2025 after finishing the elimination rounds at third place with eight wins and six losses. They, however failed to get a podium finish after losing in the semifinals and were relegated to fourth place in the final rankings. Cabañero was named to the Mythical selection for the second straight year, together with Nigerian newcomer Collins Akowe, who also won the Rookie of the Year award. Cabañero was also back as the league's scoring leader after compiling 16.8 points per game in the eliminations.

== Coaches ==
The Growling Tigers have had more than 20 coaches in over a century's existence of their basketball program. Pido Jarencio returned after a couple of coaching changes since Aldin Ayo's departure in the wake of the Sorsogon Bubble controversy. Jarencio resigned at the end of the 2013 season after leading the Tigers for eight years which resulted to one championship and two runner-up finishes.

In the team's history, six of their head coaches became coaches of the national team, and four went on to coach teams in the Philippine Basketball Association.

Aric del Rosario and Herr Silva are the team's longest tenured coaches, each compiling 17 years in service. Silva's years at the helm of the Goldies were interwoven with Fely Fajardo's tenure in the 1950s and included a one-game stint as an interim coach in 1964 after Fajardo's resignation prior to the start of the UAAP season. He is also the school's winningest coach with nine championships, the first of which were six straight titles from 1939 until 1949 (interrupted by the war), and then a three-peat from 1951 to 1953. Del Rosario was promoted head coach in 1985 following a stint with UST's high school basketball program. He stepped down after three years following a controversy involving one of his players' eligibility issues. He came back in 1990 and led the Tigers to a four-year championship run, the first of which was an undefeated 1993 campaign.

Silva was also enshrined to the PSC's Philippine Sports Hall of Fame in 2010 as coach of the 1954 national team that competed in the FIBA World Championship in Brazil. Chito Calvo was included in the fourth batch of inductees in 2021. He was also enshrined to the FIBA Hall of Fame as a contributor to the sport in 2007. Both coaches were honored with the Lifetime Achievement Award by the National Basketball Hall of Fame Foundation in 1999.

=== Succession of head coaches ===
No.	Head coach	Tenure	Ref.
1	Unknown	1920–28	
2	Chito Calvo	1929–1930s	
3	Jose Rodríguez	1930s–1938	
4	Herminio Silva	1939–54	
5	Fely Fajardo	1955–56	
6	Herminio Silva	1957–58	
7	Fely Fajardo	1959–64	
8	Herminio Silva	1964 (interim)	
9	Carlos Loyzaga	1964–66	
10	Egie Serafico	1967–68	
11	Lauro Mumar	1969	
12	Laureano Silva	1970	
13	Andy Bautista	1971–73	
14	Francis Wilson	1974–77	
15	Egie Serafico	1978–80	

No.	Head coach	Tenure	Ref.
16	Eddie Pacheco	1981	
17	Charlie Badion	1982–84	
18	Aric del Rosario	1985–87	
19	Orly Bauzon	1988	
20	Fred Reyes	1989	
21	Tonichi Pujante	1989	
22	Aric del Rosario	1990–2003	
23	Reonel Parado	2004–05	
24	Pido Jarencio	2006–13	
25	Bong dela Cruz	2014–15	
26	Boy Sablan	2016–17	
27	Aldin Ayo	2018–20	
28	Jino Manansala	2020–22	
29	Bal David	2022	
30	Pido Jarencio	2023–present	

=== Coaches in the national team and the PBA ===
Coaches in the national team
No.	Head coach	Year	Tournament	Rank
1	Chito Calvo	1936; 1948; 1951	Berlin Olympics; London Olympics; New Delhi Asian Games	5th 12th 1st
2	Felicisimo Fajardo	1952; 1963; 1965; 1966; 1970	Helsinki Olympics; Taipei ABC Championship; Kuala Lumpur ABC Championship; Bangkok Asian Games; ABC Youth Championship	9th 1st 2nd 6th 1st
3	Herminio Silva	1954; 1954	Manila Asian Games; Brazil World Championship	1st 3rd
4	Carlos Loyzaga	1967; 1968	Seoul ABC Championship; Mexico Olympics	1st 13th
5	Lauro Mumar	1969	Bangkok ABC Championship	3rd
6	Aric del Rosario	2003; 2003; 2003	5th SEABA Championship; Harbin ABC Championship; Vietnam SEA Games	1st 15th 1st

Coaches in the PBA
No.	Head coach	Team	Tenure
1	Felicisimo Fajardo	N-Rich Coffee Makers; Tefilin Polyesters	1976; 1980–81
2	Carlos Loyzaga	U/Tex Weavers; Tanduay ESQ	1975–76; 1977–79
3	Pido Jarencio	NorthPort Batang Pier	2014–15; 2017–2023
4	Aldin Ayo	Converge FiberXers	2022–24

== Season-by-season record ==
Champion	Runner-up	Third place

=== Pre-UAAP era ===
NCAA
Year	Field	Result	Ref.
1929	10	2nd	
1930	9	1st	

Big Three
Year	Field	Result	Ref.
1930	3	1st	
1931	3	1st	
1932	3	1st	
1933	3	1st	

=== Pre-Final Four era ===
Round robin era
Year	Field	GP	Result	Ref.	Coach
1939	4	6	Co-champions with UP and FEU (Note: The three teams had identical 4–2 records)		Herminio Silva
1940	4	6	Champion		Herminio Silva
1941	Tournament cancelled due to war				Herminio Silva
1942	Tournament cancelled due to war				Herminio Silva
1943	Tournament cancelled due to war				Herminio Silva
1944	Tournament cancelled due to war				Herminio Silva
1945	Tournament cancelled due to war				Herminio Silva
1946	4	6	Champion (Note: Undefeated at 6–0)		Herminio Silva
1947	4	6	Co-champions with FEU (Note: Game discontinued due to power failure)		Herminio Silva
1948	4	6	Won Final vs FEU		Herminio Silva
1949	4	6	Won Final vs FEU		Herminio Silva
1950	4	6	Lost Final vs FEU		Herminio Silva
1951	4	6	Won Final vs FEU		Herminio Silva
1952	8	14	Won Final vs NU		Herminio Silva
1953	8	14	Won Final vs FEU		Herminio Silva
1954	8	14	Did not qualify; ranked 3rd Won 3rd place game vs UP		Herminio Silva
1955	6	10	Won Final vs NU		Fely Fajardo
1957	6	10	Lost Final vs UE		Herminio Silva
1959	6	10	Won 2nd-seed playoff vs FEU; Won Final vs UE		Fely Fajardo
1960	6	10	Won 4th-seed playoff vs MCU; Lost semifinal game vs FEU; Final rank: 4th		Fely Fajardo
1961	6	10	Did not qualify; ranked 3rd Won 3rd place game vs NU		Fely Fajardo

Twice-to-beat championship era
Year	Field	GP	Result	Ref.	Coach
1963	5	8	Ranked 2nd after eliminations Won Finals vs UE, 2–0; Championship overturned		Fely Fajardo
1964	5	8	Ranked 2nd after eliminations Won Finals vs FEU, 2–1		Carlos Loyzaga
1965	5	8	Ranked T-1st after eliminations, 7–1; Lost Finals vs UE, 1–2		Carlos Loyzaga
1966	5	8	Ranked T-1st after eliminations, 6–2; Lost Finals vs UE, 0–2		Carlos Loyzaga
1967	5	8	Lost Finals vs UE		Egie Serafico
1968	5	8	Finals vs UE tied at 1–all Declared co-champions with UE (Note: Deciding Game 3 discontinued at 51–40 (UST) after both coaches refused to submit their 2nd half starting lineups)		Egie Serafico
1969	5	8	Ranked 2nd after eliminations UE declared champion after eliminations sweep		Lauro Mumar
1971	6	10	Lost Finals vs UE		Andy Bautista
1972	6	10	Ranked 2nd after eliminations, 7–3; Lost Finals vs FEU, 0–1		Andy Bautista
1975	6	10	Did not qualify; ranked 5th		Francis Wilson
1976	6	10	Did not qualify; ranked 3rd		Francis Wilson
1977	6	10	Did not qualify; ranked 4th, 5–5		Francis Wilson
1979	7	12	Ranked T-2nd after eliminations, 9–3; Won 2nd-seed playoff vs UE; Lost Finals vs FEU, 0–1		Egie Serafico
1980	7	12	Ranked T-2nd after eliminations, 7–5; FEU declared champion after eliminations sweep		Egie Serafico
1983	7	12	Ranked T-2nd after eliminations, 8–4; Lost 2nd-seed playoff vs UP		Charlie Badion
1984	7	12	Ranked T-1st after eliminations Lost Finals vs UE		Charlie Badion
1985	7	12	Ranked 1st after eliminations, 9–3; Lost Finals vs UE, 0–2		Aric del Rosario
1987	8	14	Did not qualify; ranked 7th, 3–11		Aric del Rosario
1988	8	14	Did not qualify; ranked 7th, 3–11		Orly Bauzon
1989	8	14	Did not qualify; ranked 7th, 2–12		Reyes/Pujante
1990	8	14	Did not qualify; ranked T-4th, 8–6		Aric del Rosario
1991	8	14	Ranked T-2nd after eliminations, 11–3; Lost 2nd-seed playoff vs FEU		Aric del Rosario
1992	8	14	Did not qualify; ranked 4th, 10–4		Aric del Rosario

=== Final Four era ===
Season	Team	Eliminations					Playoffs					Ref.	Coach
Season	Team	Field	GP	W	L	Rank	Round	Opponent	GP	W	L	Ref.	Coach
56	1993	8	14	14	0	1st	Declared automatic champions		–	–	–		Aric del Rosario
57	1994	7	12	8	4	3rd	Semifinals; Finals	#2 UE Red Warriors #1 La Salle Green Archers	2; 3	2; 2	0; 1		Aric del Rosario
58	1995	8	14	11	3	1st	Semifinals; Finals	#4 FEU Tamaraws #2 La Salle Green Archers	2; 3	1; 2	1; 1		Aric del Rosario
59	1996	8	14	10	4	2nd	Semifinals; Finals	#3 UP Fighting Maroons #1 La Salle Green Archers	1; 2	1; 2	0; 0		Aric del Rosario
60	1997	8	14	10	4	2nd	Semifinals	#3 La Salle Green Archers	2	0	2		Aric del Rosario
61	1998	8	14	7	7	T–4th	4th-seed playoff Semifinals	UP Fighting Maroons #1 La Salle Green Archers	1; 2	1; 1	0; 1		Aric del Rosario
62	1999	8	14	11	3	T–1st	#1 seed playoff Semifinals; Finals	La Salle Green Archers #3 Ateneo Blue Eagles #1 La Salle Green Archers	1; 1; 3	0; 1; 1	1; 0; 2		Aric del Rosario
63	2000	8	14	8	6	T–4th	4th-seed playoff Semifinals	UE Red Warriors #1 La Salle Green Archers	1; 1	1; 0	0; 1		Aric del Rosario
64	2001	8	14	6	8	T–6th	Did not qualify		–	–	–		Aric del Rosario
65	2002	8	14	8	6	4th	Semifinals	#1 La Salle Green Archers	1	0	1		Aric del Rosario
66	2003	8	14	5	9	T–5th	Did not qualify		–	–	–		Aric del Rosario
67	2004	8	14	4	10	7th	Did not qualify		–	–	–		Nel Parado
68	2005	8	14	4	10	6th	Did not qualify		–	–	–		Nel Parado
69	2006	7	12	6	6	T–3rd	3rd-seed playoff Semifinals; Finals	Adamson Soaring Falcons #2 UE Red Warriors #1 Ateneo Blue Eagles	1; 2; 3	1; 2; 2	0; 0; 1		Pido Jarencio
70	2007	8	14	8	6	T–4th	4th-seed playoff Stepladder round 1	FEU Tamaraws #3 Ateneo Blue Eagles	1; 1	1; 0	0; 1		Pido Jarencio
71	2008	8	14	6	8	5th	Did not qualify		–	–	–		Pido Jarencio
72	2009	8	14	6	8	4th	Semifinals	#1 Ateneo Blue Eagles	1	0	1		Pido Jarencio
73	2010	8	14	4	10	7th	Did not qualify		–	–	–		Pido Jarencio
74	2011	8	14	8	6	4th	Semifinals	#1 Ateneo Blue Eagles	1	0	1		Pido Jarencio
75	2012	8	14	10	4	2nd	Semifinals; Finals	#3 NU Bulldogs #1 Ateneo Blue Eagles	1; 2	1; 0	0; 2		Pido Jarencio
76	2013	8	14	8	6	4th	Semifinals; Finals	#1 NU Bulldogs #2 La Salle Green Archers	2; 3	2; 1	0; 2		Pido Jarencio
77	2014	8	14	5	9	6th	Did not qualify		–	–	–		Bong dela Cruz
78	2015	8	14	11	3	1st	Semifinals; Finals	#4 NU Bulldogs #2 FEU Tamaraws	1; 3	1; 1	0; 2		Bong dela Cruz
79	2016	8	14	3	11	8th	Did not qualify		–	–	–		Boy Sablan
80	2017	8	14	1	13	8th	Did not qualify		–	–	–		Boy Sablan
81	2018	8	14	5	9	6th	Did not qualify		–	–	–		Aldin Ayo
82	2019	8	14	8	6	4th	Stepladder round 1 Stepladder round 2 Finals	#3 FEU Tamaraws #2 UP Fighting Maroons #1 Ateneo Blue Eagles	1; 2; 2	1; 2; 0	0; 0; 2		Aldin Ayo
83	2020	Tournament cancelled due to COVID-19											Jino Manansala
84	2021	8	14	3	11	7th	Did not qualify		–	–	–		Jino Manansala
85	2022	8	14	1	13	8th	Did not qualify		–	–	–		Bal David
86	2023	8	14	2	12	8th	Did not qualify		–	–	–		Pido Jarencio
87	2024	8	14	7	7	3rd	Semifinals	#2 UP Fighting Maroons	1	0	1		Pido Jarencio
88	2025	8	14	8	6	3rd	Semifinals	#2 UP Fighting Maroons	1	0	1		Pido Jarencio
Eliminations			444	216	228	.486	18 playoff appearances						
Playoffs and Finals			55	30	25	.545	9 Finals appearances						
Overall record			499	246	253	.493	5 championships						

=== Final Four seeding history ===
Year	'93	'94	'95	'96	'97	'98	'99	'00	'02	'06	'07	'09	'11	'12	'13	'15	'19	'24	'25
Seed	1 (Note: The Final Four was not held after UST was declared automatic champions)	3	1	2	2	4	2	4	4	3	4	4	4	2	4	1	4	3	3 (Note: Relegated to fourth place after final ranking)

== Current roster ==
As of 13 Sep 2026

UST Growling Tigers roster
Players
Coaches

Pos.	No.	Nat.	Name	Height	Year	High School
PG	0	(Philippines)	Kirk Nuhlan Cañete	5'10" (1.78m)	1st	University of Santo Tomas
C	3	(Nigeria)	Collins Akowe	6'10" (2.08m)	2nd	National University Nazareth School
PG	4	(United States)	Donovan Tyler Sevilla	6'0" (1.83m)	5th	Dougherty Valley High School
SF	8	(Philippines)	Hezekiah Charles Bucsit	6'3" (1.91m)	2nd	University of Santo Tomas
PF	10	(Philippines)	Mark Angelo Crisostomo	6'6" (1.98m)	4th	Sta. Teresita National High School
PG	11	(Philippines)	Prince Ray Alao	6'1" (1.85m)	1st	San Beda University–Rizal
SF	12	(Philippines)	Glenn Isaac Danting	6'2" (1.88m)	3rd	University of the Assumption
SF	14	(Philippines)	Mark Allen Llemit (C)	6'3" (1.91m)	4th	University of Santo Tomas
SF	15	(United States)	Landyn Keola Jumawan	6'4" (1.93m)	5th	Atascocita High School
PF	19	(Philippines)	Koji Ivan Buenaflor	6'6" (1.98m)	2nd	University of Santo Tomas
SG	20	(Philippines)	Leonardo Amiel Acido	6'4" (1.93m)	3rd	University of Perpetual Help
C	24	(Philippines)	Kristian Michael Porter	6'5" (1.96m)	2nd	Ateneo de Manila
PG	25	(Philippines)	Jiro Sevilla	5'11" (1.8m)	2nd	De La Salle Santiago Zobel School
SG	26	(Philippines)	Carl Vincent Manding	6'3" (1.91m)	2nd	University of Santo Tomas
PF	30	(Philippines)	Charles Francis Esteban	6'4" (1.93m)	1st	University of Santo Tomas
C	32	(Nigeria)	Peter Chukwudi Osang	6'7" (2.01m)	1st	Ikorodu
SG	77	(Philippines)	Andrew Xavier Chio	6'0" (1.83m)	1st	Xavier School

Head coach

- (Philippines) Alfredo Lorenzo Jarencio

Assistant coach(es)

- Marco Januz Sauler
- Victor Pedro Martin
- Alvin Grey
- John Paul Cuan
- Juben Ledesma
- Alfredo Jarencio II
- Carlos Joaquin Balingit

Team manager

- Waiyip Chong
- Eric Ang

Legend

- (C) Team captain
- Injured

- [ Roster]

=== Depth chart ===
Pos.	Starting 5	Bench 1	Bench 2
C	Akowe	Buenaflor	Porter
PF	Jumawan	Crisostomo	Esteban
SF	Llemit	Danting	Manding
SG	Acido	Alao
PG	D. Sevilla	Cañete

== Awards ==
=== Team ===
- UAAP

Champions:
- 1939
- 1940
- 1946
- 1947
- 1948
- 1949
- 1951
- 1952
- 1953
- 1955
- 1959
- 1964
- 1968
- 1993
- 1994
- 1995
- 1996
- 2006
Runners-up:
- 1950
- 1957
- 1963
- 1965
- 1966
- 1967
- 1971
- 1972
- 1979
- 1980
- 1984
- 1985
- 1999
- 2012
- 2013
- 2015
- 2019
3rd place:
- 1954
- 1961
- 1976
- 1983
- 1991
- 1997
- 2024

- NCAA

Champions: 1930
Runners-up: 1929

- Big Three League

Champions:
- 1930
- 1931
- 1932
- 1933

- National Students Athletic Championship (NSAC)

Champions: 2026

- National Open Championships

Champions:
- 1937
- 1940
- 1941
- 1949
- 1951
Runners-up: 1948

- National Intercollegiate Championship

Champions:
- 1952
- 1955
- 1993
Runners-up:
- 1950
- 1964
3rd place: 1966

- National Seniors Basketball Championship

Champions: 1996

- National Students Basketball Championship

Runners-up: 1988
3rd place: 1992

- PinoyLiga The Big Dance

Champions: 2026

- Philippine Collegiate Champions League

Champions: 2012
3rd place: 2002

- Fr. Martin Cup Basketball Tournament

Champions: 1996
Runners-up:
- 1995
- 2014
- 2015
3rd place: 2005

- PRISAA Basketball Tournament

Champions:
- 2001
- 2005

- Home and Away Invitational League

Runners-up: 2005

- McDonald's Cup Battle of Champions

Champions: 1994
Runners-up: 1996

- Millennium Basketball League

Champions: 2011, 2013
Runners-up: 2009

- Ambrosio Padilla Cup

Runners-up: 2002

=== Individual ===
- Francisco Vestil

1947 UAAP MVP

- Ning Ramos

1952 UAAP MVP
1952 UAAP Mythical team

- Ramon Manulat

1952 UAAP Mythical team

- Francis Wilson

1954 UAAP Mythical team

- Eddie Pacheco

1954 UAAP Mythical 2nd team

- Valentino Rosabal

1959 UAAP Rookie of the Year
1963 UAAP MVP

- Aric del Rosario

1963 UAAP Rookie of the Year

- Pido Jarencio

1983, 1984 UAAP Mythical team
2006 UAAP Coach of the Year
2012 PCCL Coach of the Year

- Dennis Espino

1991, 1993, 1994 UAAP Mythical team
1992 UAAP Mythical 2nd team
1993, 1994 UAAP MVP

- Rudolf Belmonte

1992 UAAP Mythical team
1993 UAAP Mythical 2nd team

- Rey Evangelista

1992, 1993 UAAP Mythical team

- Patrick Fran

1993 UAAP Mythical team

- Chris Cantonjos

1995 UAAP MVP
1995 UAAP Mythical team

- Gerard Francisco

1995 UAAP Rookie of the Year
1995 UAAP Mythical team

- Richard Yee

1995, 1998 UAAP Mythical 2nd team

- Ernesto Ballesteros

1996 UAAP Mythical team

- Marvin Ortiguerra

1999 UAAP Mythical team

- Warren de Guzman

2001 UAAP All-rookie team

- Cyrus Baguio

2002 UAAP Mythical team

- Jervy Cruz

2005 PRISAA MVP
2006, 2007, 2008 UAAP Mythical team
2007 UAAP MVP

- Jojo Duncil

2006 UAAP Finals MVP

- Clark Bautista

2008 UAAP All-rookie team

- Dylan Ababou

2009 UAAP MVP
2009 UAAP Mythical team
2009 UAAP Scoring leader

- Jeric Teng

2009 UAAP Rookie of the Year
2012 PCCL MVP
2012 PCCL Mythical team

- Allein Maliksi

2009 Millennium Basketball League MVP

- Jeric Fortuna

2011 Millennium Basketball League MVP
2012 PCCL Mythical team

- Karim Abdul

2012, 2013, 2014 UAAP Mythical team
2012 PCCL Mythical team

- Ed Daquioag

2013 Millennium Basketball League MVP
2015 UAAP Mythical team

- Kevin Ferrer

2015 UAAP Mythical team

- Renzo Subido

2018 Kim Lope Asis Invitational MVP

- Soulémane Chabi Yo

2019 UAAP MVP
2019 UAAP Mythical team

- Mark Nonoy

2019 UAAP Rookie of the Year

- Nic Cabañero

2022, 2023, 2025 UAAP Scoring leader
2024, 2025 UAAP Mythical team

- Collins Akowe

2025 UAAP Rookie of the Year
2025 UAAP Mythical team
2026 PinoyLiga The Big Dance MVP
2026 PinoyLiga The Big Dance Mythical team

- Mark Llemit

2025 U-Belt Basketball Cup Mythical team
2026 National Students Athletic Championship Finals MVP
2026 PinoyLiga The Big Dance Mythical team

- Ivanne Calum

2025 PinoyLiga Collegiate Cup Mythical team

- Gelo Crisostomo

2025 Filoil Preseason Cup Mythical team
2026 National Students Athletic Championship Mythical team

- Landyn Jummawan

2026 PinoyLiga The Big Dance Mythical team

== Notable players ==
=== Succession of team captains ===
No.	Player	Year	Ref.
1	Alfredo del Rosario	1930	
2	Gabby Fajardo	1939	
3	Ramon Manzano	1949	
4	Paing Hechanova	1951	
5	Ning Ramos	1952–53	
6	Andy Bautista	1955	
7	Angel Pavilando	1958	
8	Priscilo Gabuya	1959	
9	Sonny Reyes	1963	
10	Romeo Ramos	1964	
11	Manuel Tan	1965	
12	Bobby Salonga	1966	
13	Ceferino dela Paz	1967	
14	Mario Marasigan	1975	
15	Plaridel Ponge	1976	
16	Rene Ugalde	1977	
17	Edmund Yee	1978	
18	Ed Cordero	1979	
19	Benjie Gutierrez	1982	
20	Raymond Fran	1983	
21	Alfrancis Chua	1989	
22	Billy Reyes	1991	
23	Rudolf Belmonte	1992	
24	Patrick Fran	1993	
25	Edmund Reyes	1994	
26	Lester del Rosario	1995	

No.	Player	Year	Ref.
27	Chris Cantonjos	1996	
28	Dale Singson	1998	
29	Gelo Velasco	1999	
30	Marvin Ortiguerra	2000	
31	Emmerson Oreta	2001	
32	Derick Hubalde	2002	
33	Jino Manansala	2003	
34	Christian Luanzon	2004	
35	Warren de Guzman	2005	
36	Allan Evangelista	2006	
37	Anthony Espiritu	2007	
38	Francis Allera	2008	
39	Dylan Ababou	2009	
40	AC Marquez	2010	
41	Jeric Fortuna	2011–12	
42	Jeric Teng	2013	
43	Aljon Mariano	2014	
44	Kevin Ferrer	2015	
45	Louie Vigil	2016	
46	Marvin Lee	2017–18	
47	CJ Cansino	2019	
48	Vacant	2020	
49	Paul Manalang	2021–23	
50	Nic Cabañero	2024–25	
51	Mark Llemit	2025–present	

=== Retired jerseys ===
UST Growling Tigers retired jerseys
No.	Player	Position	Tenure
15	Chris Cantonjos	Center	1993–96

Chris Cantonjos' jersey No. 15 has been retired in recognition of his contributions to the team's four-peat championship that includes an undefeated season in 1993, as well as for being named MVP and a two-time member of the Mythical team.

The No. 15, however, remains in circulation and has since been used by the following players:

Robert Hainga, 2012–13
Jeepy Faundo, 2014–17
Toby Agustin, 2018
Kenji Duremdes, 2022–23
Landyn Jumawan, 2026

Jino Manansala had used the No. 15 during his rookie year in 1999 before settling for the No. 11 in 2001.

=== Hall of Fame inductees ===
No.	Year	Name	Inducted as	Award body	Ref.
1	1990	Francisco Vestil	Player	Cebu Sports Hall of Fame	
2	2000	Francisco Vestil	Player	National Basketball Hall of Fame	
3	1999	Felicisimo Fajardo	Player	National Basketball Hall of Fame	
4	1999	Gabby Fajardo	Player	National Basketball Hall of Fame	
5	1999	Jacinto Ciria Cruz	Player	National Basketball Hall of Fame	
6	1999	Primitivo Martinez	Player	National Basketball Hall of Fame	
7	1999	Ramoncito Campos	Player	National Basketball Hall of Fame	
8	1999	Julian Malonso	Lifetime achievement	National Basketball Hall of Fame	
9	1999	Chito Calvo	Lifetime achievement	National Basketball Hall of Fame	
10	2007	Chito Calvo	Contributor	FIBA Hall of Fame	
11	2021	Chito Calvo	Coach	PSC Sports Hall of Fame	
12	1999	Herminio Silva	Lifetime achievement	National Basketball Hall of Fame	
13	2010	Herminio Silva	Coach of the 1954 PH team	PSC Sports Hall of Fame	
14	2000	Paing Hechanova	Player	National Basketball Hall of Fame	
15	2000	Pocholo Martinez	Player	National Basketball Hall of Fame	
16	2000	Tito Eduque	Lifetime achievement	National Basketball Hall of Fame	
17	2005	Bogs Adornado	Player	PBA Hall of Fame	
18	2007	Danny Florencio	Player	PBA Hall of Fame	
19	2010	Ramon Manulat	Player of the 1954 PH team	PSC Sports Hall of Fame	
20	2010	Napoleon Flores	Player of the 1954 PH team	PSC Sports Hall of Fame	

=== National team appearances ===
- Jose Rodriguez

1923 Far Eastern Games

- Jacinto Ciria Cruz

1930, 1934 Far Eastern Games
1936 Olympics

- Primitivo Martinez

1934 Far Eastern Games
1936, 1948 Olympics

- Herminio Silva

1934 Far Eastern Games
1954 FIBA World Championship (coach)
1954 Asian Games (coach)

- Ramoncito Campos

1948 Olympics

- Francisco Vestil

1948 Olympics (flag bearer)

- Felicisimo Fajardo

1948 Olympics (captain)
1952 Olympics (coach)
1963, 1965 ABC Championship (coach)
1966 Asian Games (coach)

- Gabby Fajardo

1948 Olympics

- Pocholo Martinez

1951 Asian Games (captain)
1952 Olympics (captain)

- Genaro Fernandez

1951 Asian Games

- Ning Ramos

1951, 1954 Asian Games
1971 ABC Championship (coach)
1972 Olympics (coach)

- Paing Hechanova

1951 Asian Games
1954 Asian Games (captain)
1952 Olympics

- Napoleon Flores

1954 FIBA World Championship
1954 Asian Games

- Ramon Manulat

1954, 1958, 1962 Asian Games
1954, 1959 FIBA World Championship
1956 Olympics

- Francis Wilson

1958, 1962 Asian Games
1959 FIBA World Championship (alternate)

- Roberto Yburan

1959 FIBA World Championship
1960 Olympics
1960 ABC Championship

- Eddie Pacheco

1960 Olympics
1960, 1963 ABC Championship
1962 Asian Games

- Cristobal Ramas

1960 Olympics

- Sonny Reyes

1963, 1965, 1967 ABC Championship
1966, 1970 Asian Games
1968 Olympics

- Orly Bauzon

1965, 1967 ABC Championship
1968 Olympics
1970 Asian Games

- Danny Florencio

1966, 1970, 1974 Asian Games
1967 ABC Championship
1968, 1972 Olympics

- Bogs Adornado

1968, 1972 Olympics
1970 ABC Youth Championship (captain)
1973 ABC Championship
1974 FIBA World Championship
1974 Asian Games

- Lawrence Mumar

1969, 1971 ABC Championship
1973 ABC Championship (alternate)

- Genny Lucindo

1969 ABC Championship

- Edmund Yee

1978 ABC Youth Championship

- Ray Obias

1978 FIBA World Championship

- Ed Cordero

1980 ABC Youth Championship
1981 ABC Championship
1981 Southeast Asian Games

- Pido Jarencio

1985 ABC Championship

- Benjie Gutierrez

1985 ABC Championship (alternate)

- Bobby Jose

1986 ABC Youth Championship

- Gido Babilonia

1989, 1999 ABC Championships
1989 Southeast Asian Games

- EJ Feihl

1990 ABC U-18 Championship

- Joaquin Dindo Torres

1990 ABC U-18 Championship

- Renato Cabaluna

1990 ABC U-19 Championship
1993 ABC Championship

- Patrick Fran

1992 ABC U-18 Championship
1993, 1995 ABC Championship

- Dennis Espino

1992 ABC U-18 Championship
1993 ABC Championship
1998, 2002 Asian Games

- Chris Cantonjos

1992 ABC U-18 Championship
1995, 1997 Southeast Asian Games
1995, 1997 ABC Championship
1996 ABC U-22 Championship
1996, 1998 SEABA Championship

- Rudolf Belmonte

1993 ABC Championship (captain)

- Edmund Reyes

1993 ABC Championship

- Rey Evangelista

1993 ABC Championship
1994 Asian Games

- Siot Tanquingcen

1993, 1995 ABC Championship
1993 Southeast Asian Games

- Dale Singson

1993 Southeast Asian Games
1996 ABC U-22 Championship
1996 SEABA Championship

- Joel Villanueva

1994 SEABA U-19 Championship

- Billy Reyes

1995 ABC Championship
1996 ABC U-22 Championship
1996 SEABA Championship

- Bal David

1995 Southeast Asian Games

- Richard Melencio

1995, 1997, 2003 Southeast Asian Games
1996 ABC U-22 Championship
1997, 1999, 2003 ABC Championship
1998, 2003 SEABA Championship

- Ernesto Ballesteros

1996 SEABA Championship

- Melchor Latoreno

1996 SEABA U-18 Championship
1996 ABC U-18 Championship
2005 SEABA Championship

- Gerard Francisco

1996 ABC U-22 Championship
1997 ABC Championship
1997 Southeast Asian Games

- Emmerson Oreta

1998 SEABA U-18 Championship
2003 ABC Championship
2003 SEABA Championship

- Cyrus Baguio

1998 SEABA U-18 Championship
1998 ABC U-18 Championship
2009 FIBA Asia Championship
2009 SEABA Championship

- Niño Gelig

1998 SEABA U-18 Championship
1998 ABC U-18 Championship

- Aric del Rosario

2003 ABC Championship (coach)
2003 SEABA Championship (coach)
2003 Southeast Asian Games (coach)

- Dylan Ababou

2004 SEABA U-18 Championship
2011 SEABA Championship

- Mark Canlas

2004 ABC U-18 Championship

- Dondon Villamin

2005 SEABA Championship

- Christian Luanzon

2005 SEABA Championship

- Jervy Cruz

2007 Southeast Asian Games

- Kent Lao

2012 SEABA U-18 Championship

- Kevin Ferrer

2015 SEABA Championship
2015 Southeast Asian Games

- Allein Maliksi

2017 SEABA Championship
2019 FIBA World Qualifying

=== Growling Tigers in the PBA draft ===
Year	Player	Round	Pick	Team
1975	Orly Bauzon	Elevated (Note: The first PBA rookie draft was instituted in 1985)		Toyota Comets
1975	Danny Florencio	Elevated		U/Tex Weavers
1975	George Lizares	Elevated		U/Tex Weavers
1975	Lawrence Mumar	Elevated		U/Tex Weavers
1975	Bogs Adornado	Elevated		Crispa Redmanizers
1975	Bobby Salonga	Elevated		Carrier Weather Makers
1975	Genny Lucindo	Elevated		Carrier Weather Makers
1976	Ed Camus	Elevated		Quasar TV Makers
1978	Mario Marasigan	Elevated		Honda Wildcats
1980	Frank Natividad	Elevated		Crispa Redmanizers
1980	Butch Orozco	Elevated		Tefilin Fibermakers
1981	Ray Obias	Elevated		San Miguel Beermen
1982	Ed Cordero	Elevated		Toyota Super Corollas
1986	Pido Jarencio	Elevated (Note: Player elevated to the PBA from the amateur ranks by an expansion team)		Magnolia Cheese Makers
1989	Bobby Jose	1	5	San Miguel Beermen
1990	Gido Babilonia	1	4	Purefoods Hotdogs
1991	Bennett Palad	Undrafted (Note: Player was not picked during the draft but was later signed by a PBA team)		Ginebra San Miguel
1992	Rabbi Tomacruz	2	13	San Miguel Beermen
1992	Raymond Fran	Undrafted		Alaska Aces
1994	Rey Evangelista	1	2	Coney Island Ice Cream Stars
1994	Rudolf Belmonte	2	16	Swift Mighty Meaties
1994	Billy Reyes	3	20	Coney Island Ice Cream Stars
1994	Renato Cabaluna	4	22	Tondeña 65 Rum
1995	Dennis Espino	1	1	Sta. Lucia Realtors
1995	Edmund Reyes	1	7	Purefoods TJ Hotdogs
1995	Bal David	3	22	Sunkist Orange Juicers
1996	Patrick Fran	2	10	Purefoods TJ Hotdogs
1996	Siot Tanquingcen	Undrafted		Sunkist Orange Juicers
1997	Estong Ballesteros	1	4	Formula Shell Zoom Masters
1999	Chris Cantonjos	Elevated		Tanduay Rhum Masters
1999	Richard Yee	1	5	Purefoods Tender Juicy Hotdogs
1999	Gerard Francisco	2	10	Sta. Lucia Realtors
1999	Boy Valera	Undrafted		Barangay Ginebra Kings
2000	Gelo Velasco	2	13	Mobiline Phone Pals
2000	Joaquin Dindo Torres	2	17	Shell Velocity
2000	Dale Singson	Undrafted		Shell Velocity
2001	Marvin Ortiguerra	1	8	Sta. Lucia Realtors

Year	Player	Round	Pick	Team
2001	Ryan Bernardo	4	34	Mobiline Phone Pals
2002	Gilbert Lao	2	11	Coca-Cola Tigers
2002	Aries Dimaunahan	3	26	Barangay Ginebra Kings
2002	Richard Melencio	4	32	Shell Turbo Chargers
2003	Cyrus Baguio	2	14	Red Bull Thunder
2004	Niño Gelig	2	14	Talk 'N Text Phone Pals
2006	Christian Luanzon	2	18	Alaska Aces
2007	Jojo Duncil	2	15	Red Bull Barako
2009	Jervy Cruz	1	4	Rain or Shine Elasto Painters
2009	Francis Allera	2	13	Burger King Whoppers
2010	Khasim Mirza	2	16	Meralco Bolts
2010	Emmerson Oreta	Undrafted		Talk 'N Text Tropang Texters
2011	Allein Maliksi	1	8	Petron Blaze Boosters
2011	Dylan Ababou	1	10	Barako Bull Energy
2011	Mark Canlas	Undrafted		Shopinas.com Clickers
2013	Jeric Teng	2	12	Rain or Shine Elasto Painters
2013	Jeric Fortuna	2	14	Barako Bull Energy Cola
2014	Clark Bautista	3	34	Blackwater Elite
2015	Aljon Mariano	2	16	Barangay Ginebra San Miguel
2015	Robert Hainga	6	49	Mahindra Enforcer
2016	Kevin Ferrer	1	2	Barangay Ginebra San Miguel
2016	Ed Daquioag	1	6	Meralco Bolts
2017	Louie Vigil	2	17	San Miguel Beermen
2018	Jeepy Faundo	2	15	Magnolia Hotshots
2018	Kent Lao	3	30	Rain or Shine Elasto Painters
2019	Renzo Subido	2	24	NorthPort Batang Pier
2023	Bryan Santos	2	14	Converge FiberXers
2023	Sherwin Concepcion	3	27	Rain or Shine Elasto Painters
2023	Zach Huang	4	43	Meralco Bolts
2023	Ian Herrera	7	67	NorthPort Batang Pier
2023	Enrique Caunan	8	70	Terrafirma Dyip
2023	Regie Boy Basibas	11	79	NorthPort Batang Pier
2025	Christian Manaytay	1	10	Rain or Shine Elasto Painters
2025	Dave Ando	2	14	Phoenix Fuel Masters
2025	JJ Gesalem	5	50	NorthPort Batang Pier
2025	Jude Emmanuel Codiñera	7	63	Blackwater Bossing
2025	Geremy Robinson	8	70	Converge FiberXers

== Facilities ==
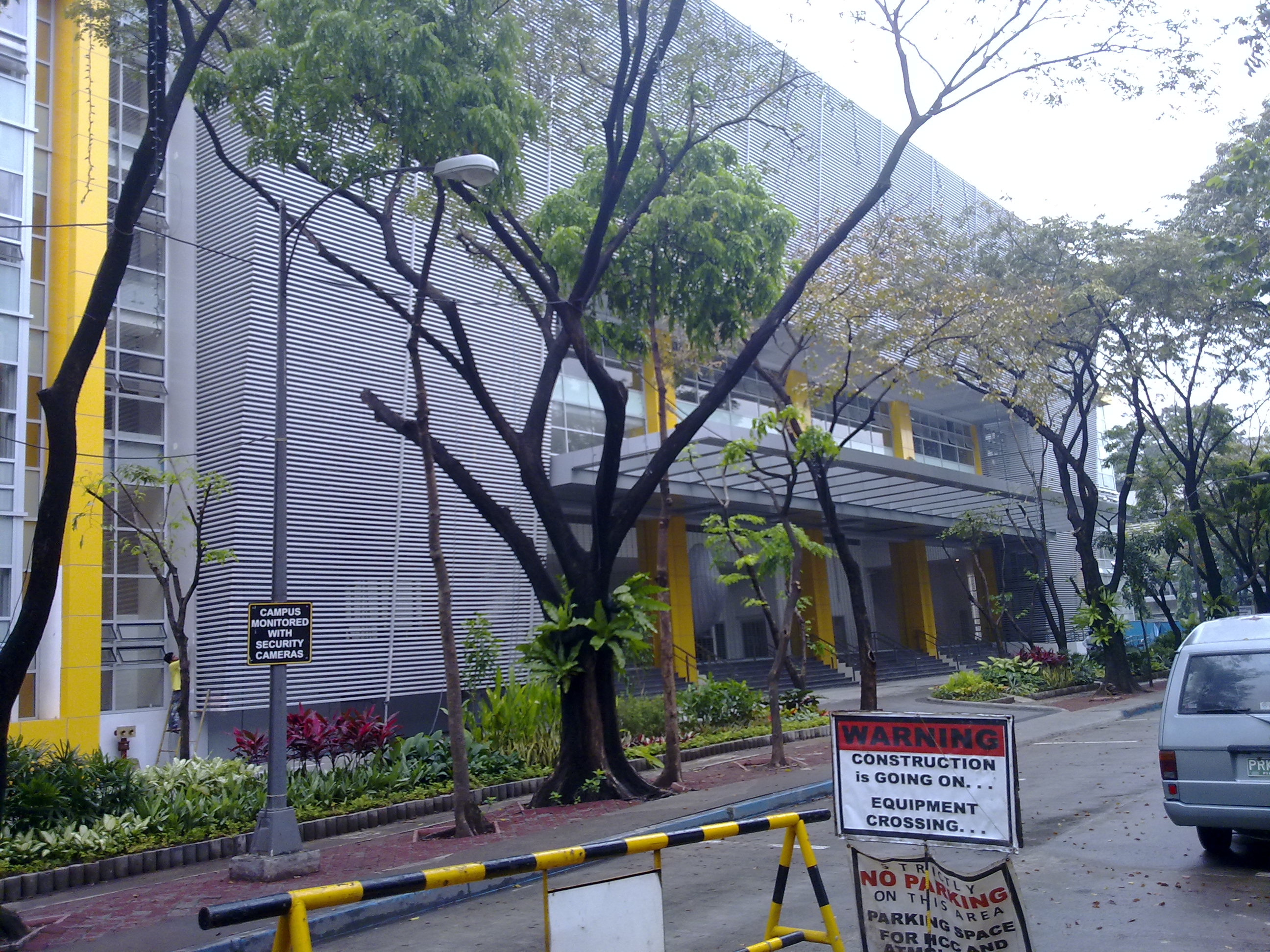
Quadricentennial Pavilion

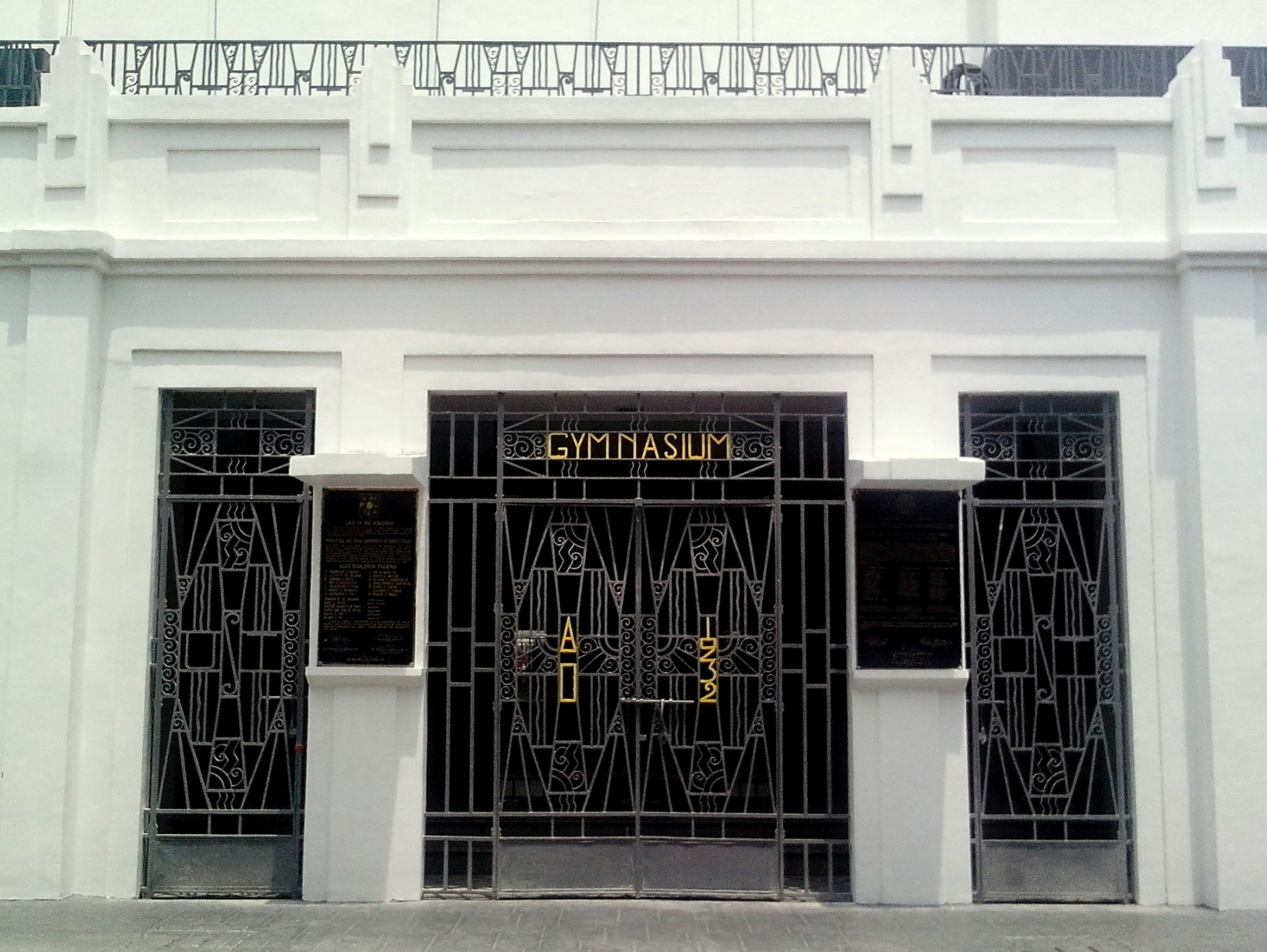
The old UST Gymnasium

- Quadricentennial Pavilion 2012–present

The Growling Tigers train and practice at the Quadricentennial Pavilion (formerly called the UST Sports Complex), located across the Faculty of Engineering's Fr. Roque Ruaño Building on España Boulevard. The four-story building houses a basketball court with a seating capacity of 5,792. Construction began in 2011, with the facility forming part of the school's numerous projects in commemoration of the 400th year of their foundation.

- UST Gymnasium 1932–2011

The old gym, which was demolished in April 2011 used to host home games of the then Glowing Goldies during the prewar UAAP until early 1946 prior to the games' transfer to the Rizal Memorial Coliseum. The transfer and the shift from the home-and-away format was necessitated after an accident occurred at the UST Gym.

== Notes ==
Awards and achievements
Preceded by UP Fighting Maroons	NCAA Men's Basketball Champion; 1930	Succeeded by Ateneo Blue Eagles
Preceded by FEU Tamaraws	UAAP Men's Basketball Champion; 1939, 1940	Vacant World War II Title next held by UST Glowing Goldies
Vacant World War II Title last held by UST Glowing Goldies	UAAP Men's Basketball Champion; 1946, 1947, 1948, 1949	Succeeded by FEU Tamaraws
Preceded by FEU Tamaraws	UAAP Men's Basketball Champion; 1951, 1952, 1953	Succeeded by NU Bulldogs
Preceded by NU Bulldogs	UAAP Men's Basketball Champion; 1955	Succeeded by FEU Tamaraws
Preceded by UE Red Warriors	UAAP Men's Basketball Champion; 1959	Succeeded by UE Red Warriors
Preceded by UE Red Warriors	UAAP Men's Basketball Champion; 1964	Succeeded by UE Red Warriors
Preceded by UE Red Warriors	UAAP Men's Basketball Champion; 1967	Succeeded by UE Red Warriors
Preceded by FEU Tamaraws	UAAP Men's Basketball Champion; 1993, 1994, 1995, 1996	Succeeded by FEU Tamaraws
Preceded by UE Red Warriors	Fr. Martin Cup Seniors Champion; 1996	Succeeded by UE Red Warriors
Preceded by FEU Tamaraws	UAAP Men's Basketball Champion; 2006	Succeeded by De La Salle Green Archers
Preceded by San Sebastian Stags	PCCL Champion; 2012	Succeeded by De La Salle Green Archers
