= Herminio Silva =

Filipino basketball coach

Career information
- College: UST

Career history

Coaching
- 1938–1954: UST
- 1954: Philippines
- 1957–1958: UST
- 1964: UST (interim)

Career highlights
- As head coach: 9× UAAP seniors' champion (1939–1940, 1946–1949, 1951–1953); As player: NCAA seniors' champion (1930); 4× Big Three league champion (1931–1934)
Medals
Head coach for Philippines
FIBA World Championship
Bronze medal – third place	1954 Brazil	Team
Asian Games
Gold medal – first place	1954 Manila	Team

Herminio "Herr" Silva is a Filipino basketball player and coach who coached the Philippine basketball team into 1954 Manila Asian Games, which the team get a gold medal, and on 1954 FIBA World Championship, which the team get the bronze medal. He also coached the UST Glowing Goldies (later Growling Tigers).

== Career ==
=== UST ===
==== Playing ====
With his national team members of Jacinto Ciria Cruz and Primitivo Martinez, Silva led the Goldies won the championships from 1931 to 1934 in the Big Three league. Silva also won the title in the NCAA in 1930.

==== Coaching ====
When the UAAP formed in 1939, Silva was hired as head coach of his alma mater when Dr. Jose Rodríguez resigned. He led the team into a championship in 1939, and 1940. The 1940 champion team became known to sports scribes as the "Captains' Team" due to the presence of five skippers in the lineup. Aside from then team captain Gabby Fajardo, the others who had served as the Goldies' leaders in past tournaments were Francisco Vestil, Salvador Siao, Enrique Novales, and Gabby's brother Fely who was a transferee from Letran. When the UAAP was on postwar resumption in 1946, Silva was retained, and after a five-year absence saw the Glowing Goldies record their first undefeated season when they won all six of their games to claim their third straight championship. In 1947, he led again the Goldies into championship, but declared co-champions with FEU for the second time in the UAAP. In the deciding match, UST was leading towards the end of regulation when a power outage struck the Rizal Memorial Coliseum, forcing play to stop. When power had not been restored after an hour, the tournament organizers decided to award the 1947 championship to both teams. He led again UST to won over FEU again in 1949 for their sixth straight championship. It was their fourth straight title in the postwar era. But they were defeated by the Tamaraws when the latter got their revenge when they defeated the Goldies for the UAAP, as well as the Intercollegiate championships in 1950.

He led the redemption for UST, as it came early for them when they won the 1951 National Open Championships in January after defeating the San Miguel Braves team of the team's former coach Chito Calvo, 47–41 in the Finals. This was the last time that a team from the UAAP won the National Open. The Glowing Goldies went on to win their first unshared three-peat championship in the UAAP from 1951 to 1953. In the 1951 UAAP Finals, Coach Silva put into play his peculiar strategy of dribbling the ball until time ran out. UST preserved their lead over FEU and went on to win the championship on a 43–34 score.

=== RP Team ===
Silva coached the Philippine basketball team at the 1954 Manila Asian Games, which the team get a gold medal, and on 1954 FIBA World Championship, which the team get the bronze medal.
