= 1992 UST Growling Tigers basketball team =

Varsity basketball season

1992 UST Growling Tigers men's basketball

Record
- Elims rank: #4
- Final rank: #4
- 1992 record: 10–4
- Head coach: Aric del Rosario (6th season)
- Assistant coaches: Boy Ascue; Mady Tabora
- Captain: Udoy Belmonte (4th season)

The 1992 UST Growling Tigers men's basketball team represented University of Santo Tomas in the 55th season of the University Athletic Association of the Philippines. The men's basketball tournament for the school year 1992–93 began on July 18, 1992, and the host school for the season was also UST.

The Glowing Goldies who had been renamed the Golden Tigers ended the double round-robin eliminations at fourth place with 10 wins against four losses. UST found themselves grouped in a quadruple tie at first place with the FEU Tamaraws, the De La Salle Green Archers, and the Adamson Falcons with a 10–3 record heading into the last game of the eliminations. They were looking into a Finals berth with a win over FEU. In the game, UST was trailing, 56–68 with 3:47 remaining when a power outage struck the venue, causing game officials to reschedule the remainder of the game. It was resumed three days later with only the last three minutes left to be contested. The Tigers lost, 76–87. They had managed to come within six points in the last 1:15 from a deficit of 63–76, but the Tamaraws clamped them down with their defense forcing the players to miss their shots.

Team captain Udoy Belmonte and Rey Evangelista were selected to the Mythical first team, while Dennis Espino, who missed a few games including the FEU match in the second round made it to the second team. Espino and Patrick Fran were members of the national team that competed at the ABC Junior Championships in Beijing.

== Roster ==
UST Growling Tigers roster
Players
Coaches

Pos.	No.	Nat.	Name	Height	Year	High School
PF	5	(Philippines)	Edmund Reyes	6'3" (1.91m)	3rd	Good Shepherd Academy
SG	6	(Philippines)	Lester Andrew del Rosario	5'11" (1.8m)	1st	University of Santo Tomas
PG	8	(Philippines)	Patrick Roy Fran	6'0" (1.83m)	4th	Aquinas School
SG	9	(Philippines)	Rudolf Belmonte (C)	5'11" (1.8m)	4th	San Beda College
SG	10	(Philippines)	Romel David	5'10" (1.78m)	1st	Mapúa Institute of Technology
PG	11	(Philippines)	Bal David, Jr.	5'9" (1.75m)	1st	University of Santo Tomas
PG	14	(Philippines)	Bethune Tanquingcen	5'9" (1.75m)	3rd	Philippine Cultural High School
C	16	(Philippines)	Dennis Espino	6'6" (1.98m)	3rd	Holy Angel University
PF	17	(Philippines)	Reynaldo Evangelista	6'4" (1.93m)	4th	St. Peter’s College of Ormoc
PG	18	(Philippines)	Vincent Kenneth Favis	5'11" (1.8m)	4th	La Salle Greenhills
SF		(Philippines)	Generoso Tengco, Jr.	6'0" (1.83m)	3rd	University of Santo Tomas
C		(Philippines)	Joaquin Dindo Torres	6'4" (1.93m)	4th	University of Santo Tomas
PF		(Philippines)	Renato Cabaluna	6'3" (1.91m)	4th	University of Santo Tomas
PF		(Philippines)	Ernesto Ballesteros	6'4" (1.93m)	1st	Mapúa Institute of Technology
SF		(Philippines)	Alexander Tan	6'2" (1.88m)	1st	–

Head coach

- (Philippines) Januario del Rosario

Assistant coach(es)

- Angel Ascue
- Amadito Tabora

Team manager

- Danny Espiritu
- Rocky Nazareno

Legend

- (C) Team captain
- Injured

- Roster

=== Depth chart ===
Pos.	Starting 5	Bench 1	Bench 2
C	Espino	Torres	Ballesteros
PF	Reyes	Evangelista	Cabaluna
SF	Tengco	Tan	Del Rosario
SG	Belmonte	Fran	R. David
PG	Favis	Tanquingcen	B. David

== Roster changes ==
=== Subtractions ===
Pos.	No.	Nat.	Player	Height	Year	High school	Notes
PG	10	(Philippines)	Beltran Reyes	5' 10"	4th	Ateneo de Manila	Graduated
SG	13	(Philippines)	Danilo Abugan	6' 1"	2nd		Academic deficiencies
SG		(Philippines)	James Sichon	5' 10"	4th	University of St. La Salle	Graduated
SF		(Philippines)	Norman Loyao		2nd		Academic deficiencies

=== Additions ===
Pos.	No.	Nat.	Player	Height	Year	High school	Notes
SG	6	(Philippines)	Lester Andrew del Rosario	5' 11"	1st	University of Santo Tomas	Rookie
SG	10	(Philippines)	Romel David	5' 10"	1st	Mapúa Institute of Technology	Rookie
PG	11	(Philippines)	Bal David, Jr.	5' 9"	1st	University of Santo Tomas	Rookie
PF		(Philippines)	Ernesto Ballesteros	6' 4"	1st	Mapúa Institute of Technology	Rookie
SF		(Philippines)	Alexander Tan	6' 2"	1st		Rookie

== Schedule and results ==
=== Preseason tournaments ===
Preseason game log

National Students Basketball Championship: 4–2
Game	Date • Time	Opponent	Result	Record	High points	High rebounds	High assists	Location
1	Mar 3	Xavier University Crusaders	W 92–71	1–0	Belmonte (18)			CSA Gym; Iloilo City
2	Mar 5	Adamson Soaring Falcons	L 95–96	1–1	Evangelista (24)			CSA Gym; Iloilo City
3	Mar 6	CCC Marines	W 99–76	2–1	Espino (26)			Tay Tung Gym; Bacolod
4	Mar 7	FEU Tamaraws	L 76–88	2–2	Belmonte (24)			Tay Tung Gym; Bacolod
5	Mar 8	CSA Eagles	W 90–73	3–2	Belmonte (24)			CSA Gym; Iloilo City
6	Mar 9	Adamson Falcons; Battle for 3rd place	W 97–89	4–2	Belmonte (22)			CSA Gym; Iloilo City

1992 National Seniors Open: 2–0
Game	Date • Time	Opponent	Result	Record	High points	High rebounds	High assists	Location
1	Mar 27 • 3:00 pm	Anaconda Metal	W 91–89	1–0	Belmonte (16)			Rizal Memorial Coliseum Manila
2	Mar 29 • 9:00 am	JCT Enterprises	W 88–82	2–0	Belmonte (30)			Rizal Memorial Coliseum Manila

1992 FCBL Senior Invitational: 7–1
Game	Date • Time	Opponent	Result	Record	High points	High rebounds	High assists	Location
1	May 3	San Beda Red Lions	W 79–53	1–0	Belmonte (24)			Arellano Legarda Gym Manila
2	May 15	Mapúa Cardinals	W 85–79	2–0	Cabaluna (16)			Arellano Legarda Gym Manila
3	May 17	De La Salle Green Archers	W 50–42	3–0	Reyes (12)			Arellano Legarda Gym Manila
4	May 22	UE Red Warriors	W 78–66	4–0	Espino (18)			Arellano Legarda Gym Manila
5	May 29	San Beda Red Lions	W 67–54	5–0	Tengco (22)			Arellano Legarda Gym Manila
6	May 31	Mapúa Cardinals	L 72–85	5–1	Tied (15)			Arellano Legarda Gym Manila
7	Jun 5	De La Salle Green Archers	W 69–59	6–1				Arellano Legarda Gym Manila
8	Jun 7	UE Red Warriors	W 85–83	7–1	Fran (14)			Arellano Legarda Gym Manila

(#) Tournament seedings in parentheses.
All times are in UTC+08:00.

=== UAAP games ===
Elimination games were played in a double round-robin format. All games were aired on RPN 9 by Silverstar Sports.

UAAP Season 55 game log

Elimination round: 10–4
Game	Date • Time	Opponent	Result	Record	High points	High rebounds	High assists	Location
1	Jul 18 • 1:00 pm	UP Fighting Maroons	W 66–58	1–0	Evangelista (25)			Araneta Coliseum; Quezon City
2	Jul 25 • 2:30 pm	Adamson Soaring Falcons	L 82–85	1–1	Evangelista (23)			Araneta Coliseum; Quezon City
3	Jul 30 • 4:00 pm	UE Red Warriors	W	2–1				
4	Aug 1 • 4:00 pm	De La Salle Green Archers	W 88–65	3–1				Loyola Center; Quezon City
5	Aug 8 • 1:00 pm	FEU Tamaraws	L	3–2				
6	Aug 15 • 4:00 pm	Ateneo Blue Eagles	W 77–55	4–2	Evangelista (25)			Loyola Center; Quezon City
7	Aug 23 • 1:30 pm	NU Bulldogs; End of R1 of eliminations	W 98–81	5–2	Belmonte (20)			Loyola Center; Quezon City
8	Aug 30 • 4:00 pm	NU Bulldogs	W 107–64	6–2	Belmonte (27)			Loyola Center; Quezon City
9	Sep 6 • 4:00 pm	UE Red Warriors	W 95–72	7–2	Evangelista (21)			Loyola Center; Quezon City
10	Sep 12 • 4:00 pm	Adamson Falcons	W 79–77	8–2	Reyes (19)			Loyola Center; Quezon City
11	Sep 17 • 4:00 pm	UP Fighting Maroons	W 83–73	9–2	Espino (16)			Loyola Center; Quezon City
12	Sep 19 • 2:00 pm	Ateneo Blue Eagles	W 72–67	10–2	Reyes (16)			Loyola Center; Quezon City
13	Sep 26 • 2:00 pm	De La Salle Green Archers	L 80–82	10–3	Tied (21)			Loyola Center; Quezon City
14	Oct 3 • 4:00 pm	FEU Tamaraws	Postponed due to power outage					Loyola Center; Quezon City
14	Oct 6 • 3:00 pm	FEU Tamaraws; End of R2 of eliminations	L 76–87	10–4	Belmonte (23)			Loyola Center; Quezon City

(#) Tournament seedings in parentheses.
All times are in UTC+08:00.
Source: Google News Archives

== Awards ==
Name	Award	Date	Ref.
Team	National Students 2nd runners-up	9 Mar 1992	
Team	FCBL Invitational 2nd runners-up	12 Jun 1992	
Rudolf Belmonte	Mythical first team	10 Oct 1992	
Rey Evangelista	Mythical first team	10 Oct 1992	
Dennis Espino	Mythical second team	10 Oct 1992	

== Players drafted into the PBA ==
Rene Cabaluna and Jay Torres, two of the Tigers' roster members were picked in the PBA draft after their stint in this year's UAAP tournament. Cabaluna was selected 22nd overall in the fourth round of the 1994 PBA draft, while Torres was 7th overall in the second round of the 2000 PBA draft.

Year	Round	Pick	Overall	Player	PBA team
1994	4	1	22	Renato Cabaluna	Tondeña 65 Rhum Masters
2000	2	7	17	Joaquin Dindo Torres	Shell Velocity
