= Charles Borck =

Filipino basketball player

Personal information
- Born: January 4, 1917 Manila, Philippine Islands
- Died: February 6, 2008 (aged 91) Las Vegas, U.S.
- Listed height: 6 ft 1 in (1.85 m)

Career information
- College: San Beda
- Position: Center

Charles Borck (January 4, 1917 – February 6, 2008) was a Filipino basketball player. Born in Quiapo, Manila, Philippines of a German father and a Spanish mother, he was nicknamed The Blonde Bombshell because of his blond hair and good looks. A 6'1" center, he played for the San Beda Red Lions men's senior basketball team and later for the Philippines at the 1936 Summer Olympics where he was the tallest member of the latter team.

After retiring from active play, Borck settled in Las Vegas, Nevada, United States in 1949. By the time of his death in 2008, he was the 1936 Philippine men's Olympic basketball team's last surviving member. He became one of the first inductees into the Philippine National Basketball Hall of Fame in 1999 along with fellow 1936 Olympic basketball team members Ambrosio Padilla, Jacinto Ciria Cruz and Primitivo Martinez.
