= UAAP Season 22 men's basketball tournament =

Basketball competition in the Philippines

1959 UAAP season
- Host school: University of Santo Tomas
| Men's Finals | G1 | Wins |
|---|---|---|
| UST Glowing Goldies | 66 | 1 |
| UE Red Warriors | 55 | 0 |
- Duration: September 15, 1959
- Arena(s): Rizal Memorial Coliseum
- Winning coach: Felicisimo Fajardo

The 1959 UAAP men's basketball tournament was the 22nd year of the men's tournament of the University Athletic Association of the Philippines (UAAP)'s basketball championship. Hosted by University of Santo Tomas, the UST Glowing Goldies defeated the UE Warriors in a single game finals taking their tenth UAAP men's basketball championship.

== Finals ==
The University of Santo Tomas displayed a well-knit man-to-man defense to smother the defending champion University of the East, 66–55, and regain the UAAP basketball crown before 9,000 fans at the Rizal Memorial Coliseum.

It was the first title for the Goldies after four years of so-so performances. Far Eastern University won it in 1956 and UE took over the next two years. FEU was eliminated by UST in the playoffs, 84–67. The victory was largely the work of two men who spent most of their playing time on the UST bench this season – rangy Asencion Aparicio and ex-Goldie skipper Angel Pavilano – and old reliable and slippery Rosendo Libunao. Established stars of the season – UST's Ramon Cotia and Reynaldo Arenas and UE's Roehl Nadurata, Mario Uson, Herman Dionisio and Tomas Paredes – failed to shake off the jitters. Nadurata, who was usually good for 20 points in tight and crucial matches, was held down to four measly points, all scored from the charity stripe, by the 6’3” Aparicio.

The lanky Tommie center didn't only excel in the guarding department. He also spearheaded UST’s offensive by scoring 20 points, two points better than Warriors pointman Rizaldo Pabillore's output. Aparicio was assisted ably by Libunao whose flawless heaves from quartercourt went for 16 points and Pavilano who checked top UE scoring aces Dionisio, Pabillore and Maximiano Concepcion from doing too much damage. This championship was the 10th the Goldies bagged since the loop commenced and, with it, they grabbed the second leg of the three-foot trophy, donated in 1955, that would go to the team that tops the loop thrice.

| Preceded by Season 21 (1958) | UAAP basketball seasons Season 22 (1959) basketball | Succeeded by Season 23 (1960) |
