= Felicisimo Fajardo =

Filipino basketball player (1914–2001)

Personal information
- Born: October 26, 1916 Floridablanca, Pampanga, Philippine Islands
- Died: August 19, 2001 (aged 84)

Career information
- High school: UST (Manila)
- College: Letran; UST
Medals
Men's basketball
Head coach for Philippines
ABC Championship
Gold medal – first place	1963 Taipei	Team
Silver medal – second place	1965 Kuala Lumpur	Team

Felicisimo Rodriguez "Fely" Fajardo (October 26, 1916 – August 19, 2001) was a Filipino basketball player who competed in the 1948 Summer Olympics.

== Basketball career ==
Fely was one of Philippine basketball's top forwards during the early 1940s. He first saw action in an organized tournament as a UST Golden Nugget in 1931. After finishing high school in 1935, he took up commerce at Letran College and powered the varsity team to its first NCAA senior title in 1940. Fely made it to the national team for the first time in the 1938 Far Eastern games in Tokyo, among his teammates were outstanding players such as Charles Borck, Francisco Vestil, brother Gabby and Arturo Rius. The Philippines placed second and Fely was again in the 1940 RP team in Manila.

After the War, Fely was back again in 1947 as a UST Glowing Goldie and one year later, was chosen to play for the national team in the 1948 London Olympics. He retired from active competition at a relatively young age of 34 in 1949.

== Coaching career ==
Fely has coach five national teams and mentored two champion teams, the 1963 ABC championships in Taipei and the 1970 ABC Youth in Manila. He piloted the Philippine team to ninth place in the 1952 Helsinki Olympics, second place in the 1965 ABC in Kuala Lumpur and fifth in the Asian Games in Bangkok in 1966. He also coached the San Beda Red Lions to three NCAA championships from 1951-1953, and transferred to his alma mater UST in 1955 and gave the Pontifical team the UAAP and inter-collegiate titles that year.

In the MICAA, Fely has coached several teams, Ysmael Steel, Meralco, YCO and lastly Mariwasa, until the team joined the PBA in 1975. After his coaching stint with Mariwasa, he became the athletic director of the University of the Philippines. However, he briefly returned to the bench via PBA expansion team Tefilin Polyesters from 1980 to 1981.
