= Udoy Belmonte =

Filipino former basketball player and commercial pilot

Personal information
- Born: December 23, 1969 (age 56)
- Listed height: 5 ft 11 in (1.80 m)
- Listed weight: 185 lb (84 kg)

Career information
- High school: San Beda (Manila)
- College: UST
- PBA draft: 1994: 4th round, 31st overall pick
- Drafted by: Swift Mighty Meaties
- Position: Guard
- Number: 16

Career history
- 1994–1995: San Miguel Beermen
- 1998–1999: Pampanga Dragons
- 2000: Batangas Blades

Career highlights
- PBA champion (1994 PBA All-Filipino); MBA champion (1998); UAAP champion (1993); UAAP Mythical First Team (1992); UAAP Mythical Second team (1993)

Rudolf "Udoy" Belmonte (born December 23, 1969) is a Filipino former basketball player, and a commercial pilot.

== Playing career ==
=== UST ===
Belmonte played for UST Growling Tigers under Aric del Rosario, and notably played with del Rosario's son Lester, Patrick Fran, Rey Evangelista, Dennis Espino, and Siot Tanquingcen.

When he was the team captain of the 1992 team, the team changed from Glowing Goldies to Golden Tigers, and for the second time, the Golden Tigers met FEU in a game that was interrupted by a power outage. Both teams lost La Salle and Adamson respectively, and in the last game of the Tigers power went-out, and the UAAP board decided to reschedule the last three minutes of the game on a later date. UST ended up losing, 76–87 and settled for fourth place with 10 wins against 4 losses. Belmonte and Rey Evangelista were chosen to the Mythical first team, while Espino made it to the second team.

The team later won the 1993 championship by sweeping all of their opponents, and got a mythical second team.

While at UST, he served as team captain of the Philippine national team for 1993 ABC Championship. And in PBL for Nikon Home Appliances in 1993, and in 1994 for Casino Rubbing Alcohol.

=== Professional and PBL ===
Belmonte was drafted by Swift Mighty Meaty in 1994, but was only signed by San Miguel Beermen and played for two seasons. He later returned to professional scene for Pampanga Dragons in Metropolitan Basketball Association in 1998, when they won championship under Del Rosario's tutelage.

== Outside basketball ==
Belmonte now currently working as a commercial pilot for Philippine Airlines.
