= NCAA Season 6 basketball tournaments =

Philippine collegiate basketball events

1930 NCAA season
- Host school: Ateneo de Manila

Men's tournament
- Champions: University of Santo Tomas
- First runner-up: Ateneo de Manila
- Winning coach: Dionisio Calvo (1st title)

Juniors' tournament
- Champions: San Juan de Letran College
- First runner-up: Jose Rizal College

The 1930 NCAA basketball tournaments, now known as the NCAA Season 6 (Note: In contemporary accounts, the 1930 NCAA season was the 8th season. However, later in the 20th century, it was reckoned that the first NCAA season in 1924 was counted as "season 0", with the 2024 season counted as "NCAA Season 100".) basketball tournaments, are the basketball tournaments of the National Collegiate Athletic Association (Philippines) (NCAA) for its 1930–31 season. Two tournaments were held, the seniors' tournament for male collegiate players, and the midgets' tournament, for male high school students.

The tournaments began on August 14, 1930, with Tomas Earnshaw, the mayor of Manila, performing the ceremonial toss, and ended on November 6, 1930.

The University of Santo Tomas (UST) won the seniors' tournament, their first, and to date, only NCAA basketball title. Meanwhile, San Juan de Letran College won their third consecutive midgets' championship.

== Teams ==
A total of 19 teams across two tournaments participated:

| College | Men's team | Midgets' team |
|---|---|---|
| Ateneo de Manila (ADM) | Team | Team |
| De La Salle College (DLSC) | Team | Team |
| Educational Institute | Team | Team |
| Jose Rizal College (JRC) | Team | Team |
| Mapua Institute of Technology (MIT) | —N/a | Team |
| National University (NU) | Team | Team |
| San Beda College (SBC) | Team | Team |
| San Juan de Letran College (SJLC) | Team | Team |
| University of the Philippines (UP) | Team | Team |
| University of Santo Tomas (UST) | Team | Team |

== Venues ==
Location of basketball venues; map's street layout corresponds to modern-day Manila

Games were initially held at the 31st Infantry Armory (formerly the Cuartel de España, now the site of the Pamantasan ng Lungsod ng Maynila) and at the Nozaleda Park (now the Agrifina Circle at Rizal Park). Beginning on the September 30 gameday, the games were held at solely at Nozaleda Park. The last game of the championship round was held at the Philippine Columbian Association.

The NCAA playing at the 31st Infantry Armory was put into question as General Douglas MacArthur decreed that only soldiers can play 31st Infantry Armory and charge admission; the NCAA's options were either to charge no admission, or play elsewhere. The NCAA then decided not to charge for admission when they play at the armory by issuing membership cards, 400 per school. These membership cards are then used to attend games.

| Venue | City |
|---|---|
| 31st Infantry Armory | Manila |
| Nozaleda Park | Manila |
| Philippine Columbian Association | Manila |

== Seniors' tournament ==
The tournament started on August 14, and ended on November 6, 1930. Opening day was also the inauguration of the 31st Infantry Armory, and was attended by about 3,500 people, including students, Catholic priests and soldiers of the United States Army Reserve, with Manila mayor Tomas Earnshaw performing the ceremonial toss.

=== Qualifying round ===
UP had its win against Educational Institute reversed as one of its players was ruled ineligible. Later in the tournament, as a result of fielding in ineligible players, all of Educational Institute's games were downgraded to exhibition games.

UST, Ateneo and NU qualified to the championship round outright. Defending champions UP and Letran were tied in the standings and held a one-game playoff to determine the final qualifier. UP won 35–28.

==== Group A ====
| Pos | Team | W | L | PCT | GB | Qualification |
|---|---|---|---|---|---|---|
| 1 | National University | 4 | 0 | 1.000 | — | Championship round |
| 2 | Ateneo de Manila (H) | 3 | 1 | .750 | 1 | Championship round |
| 3 | San Beda College | 2 | 2 | .500 | 2 | |
| 4 | De La Salle College | 1 | 3 | .250 | 3 | |
| 5 | Jose Rizal College | 0 | 4 | .000 | 4 | |

Source: The Tribune: Until Sep 10, Sep 11, Sep 13, Sep 18, Sep 21
(H) Hosts

==== Group B ====
| Pos | Team | W | L | PCT | GB | Qualification |
|---|---|---|---|---|---|---|
| 1 | University of Santo Tomas | 3 | 0 | 1.000 | — | Championship round |
| 2 | University of the Philippines (Note: UP forfeited its win against Educational Institution as one of its players were ruled ineligible for scholastic reasons.) | 1 | 2 | .333 (Note: Championship round playoff: UP 35–28 Letran) | 2 | Championship round |
| 3 | San Juan de Letran College | 1 | 2 | .333 | 2 | |
| 4 | Educational Institution (Note: The NCAA ruled downgraded all Educational Institution games into exhibition games due to ineligible players.) | 0 | 3 | .000 | 3 | Disqualified |

Source: The Tribune: Until Sep 10, Sep 11, Sep 13, Sep 18, Sep 21

=== Championship round ===
UP lost its first two games in the championship round, against Ateneo and National University, virtually guaranteeing a new champion this season. NU themselves were beaten by Santo Tomas, who were led by Herminio Silva to eliminate the former in contention. The game between UP and UST was postponed due to rain. Ateneo then avenged their qualifying round loss against National, setting up a virtual winner-takes-all game against UST for the title.

In the penultimate game that would have decided the championship, UST defeated Ateneo 55–53 in overtime, with a record crowd of 4,000 fans. Ateneo led after the end of regulation 47–46, and Ateneo players celebrated; a retabulation saw the game tied at 47–all. Both captains decided to play an extra five minutes to decide the winner, however, one of the referees, Lt. Bowen, had already left. Lou Salvador officiated the overtime by his lonesome. In the extension, Gamban and Villanueva had a 4–0 run to break a 51–all deadlock. Ouano scored for Ateneo to end the game, giving UST the title; Ateneo then put the game under protest, arguing that in a championship game, there should at least be two referees. Santo Tomas's Father Sancho told the NCAA board that there were instances that games were handled by only one referee; Ateneo's Father Hurley argued that this should only happen with the consent of both captains, with Hurley saying that they agreed to the overtime as there would have been a fight among the supporters in the venue if they decided otherwise. It was then decided to bring the matter to a neutral body to be chaired by Regino Ylanan. Ylanan chose Victor Buencamino and SIlvestre Torres as members of this neutral board; if UST lost the protest, they would ask to make the championship decided on a best-of-three series.

After three meetings, the body decided to dismiss Ateneo's protest. While the committee's letter of the decision was curt, if was inferred that they took into account that it was not Santo Tomas's fault that Lt. Bowen left after thinking that the game was over. Father Hurley accepted the decision of the body. On November 6, 1930, UST formalized the championship with a win against UP (from their postponed game earlier), finishing the season undefeated, giving the championship to coach Dionisio Calvo.

This is UST's sole NCAA seniors' basketball title. UST, UP and NU withdrew from the NCAA in 1936, and founded the University Athletic Association of the Philippines (UAAP) in 1938. Ateneo joined the UAAP in 1978.

==== Team standings ====
| Pos | Team | W | L | PCT | GB |
|---|---|---|---|---|---|
| 1 | University of Santo Tomas (C) | 3 | 0 | 1.000 | — |
| 2 | Ateneo de Manila (H) | 2 | 1 | .667 | 1 |
| 3 | National University | 1 | 2 | .333 | 2 |
| 4 | University of the Philippines | 0 | 3 | .000 | 3 |

Source: The Tribune
(C) Champions; (H) Hosts

==== Match-up results ====
| Team ╲ Game | 1 | 2 | 3 |
|---|---|---|---|
| Ateneo | UP school colors | NU school colors | UST school colors |
| NU | UP school colors | UST school colors | Ateneo school colors |
| UP | Ateneo school colors | NU school colors | UST school colors |
| UST | NU school colors | Ateneo school colors | UP school colors |

Source: Ateneo vs UP, UP vs NU, UST vs NU, NU vs Ateneo, Ateneo vs UST, UP vs UST
= Win; = OT win; = Loss; = OT loss

==== Scores ====
| Teams | ADM | NU | UP | UST |
|---|---|---|---|---|
| Ateneo | — | 43–34 | 54–27 | 53–55* |
| NU | | — | 44–29 | 39–57 |
| UP | | | — | 29–35 |
| UST | | | | — |

Source: Ateneo vs UP, UP vs NU, UST vs NU, NU vs Ateneo, Ateneo vs UST, UP vs UST
Legend: Blue = left column team win; Red = top row team win.
Matches with lighter background shading were decided after overtime.

=== Awards ===
NCAA Season 6 men's basketball champions
University of Santo Tomas
First title

== Midgets' tournament ==
The tournament started on August 14, and ended on October 11, 1930.

=== Qualifying round ===
JRC, Letran, UP and UST qualified to the championship round.

=== Championship round ===
In a battle of undefeated teams in the championship round on October 11, Letran defeated Jose Rizal by two points to retain the title.

Both UP and UST left the NCAA in 1936 and founded the UAAP in 1938. As of NCAA Season 100, both Letran and José Rizal University (JRU), formerly known as José Rizal College (JRC), are still members of the NCAA.

==== Team standings ====
| Pos | Team | W | L | PCT | GB |
|---|---|---|---|---|---|
| 1 | San Juan de Letran College (C) | 3 | 0 | 1.000 | — |
| 2 | Jose Rizal College | 2 | 1 | .667 | 1 |
| 3 | University of the Philippines | 1 | 2 | .333 | 2 |
| 4 | University of Santo Tomas | 0 | 3 | .000 | 3 |

Source: The Tribune
(C) Champions

==== Match-up results ====
| Team ╲ Game | 1 | 2 | 3 |
|---|---|---|---|
| JRC | UP school colors | UST school colors | Letran school colors |
| Letran | UST school colors | UP school colors | JRU school colors |
| UP | UST school colors | JRU school colors | Letran school colors |
| UST | UP school colors | Letran school colors | JRU school colors |

Source: UST vs UP, JRC vs UP, Letran vs UST, JRC vs UST, Letran vs UP, Letran vs JRC
= Win; = OT win; = Loss; = OT loss

==== Scores ====
| Teams | JRC | SJLC | UP | UST |
|---|---|---|---|---|
| JRC | — | 33–35 | 47–37 | 52–33 |
| Letran | | — | 33–27 | 48–46 |
| UP | | | — | 51–36 |
| UST | | | | — |

Source: UST vs UP, JRC vs UP, Letran vs UST, JRC vs UST, Letran vs UP, Letran vs JRC
Legend: Blue = left column team win; Red = top row team win.

=== Awards ===
NCAA Season 6 men's basketball champions
Colegio de San Juan de Letran
Third title, third consecutive title

== Notes ==
| Preceded by Season 5 (1929) | NCAA basketball seasons Season 6 (1930–31) | Succeeded by Season 7 (1931) |
