= UAAP Season 28 men's basketball tournament =

Basketball competition in the Philippines

1965 UAAP season
- Host school: University of Santo Tomas
Men's Finals	G1	G2	G3	Wins
UST Glowing Goldies	69	65	84	1
UE Red Warriors	67	72	88	2
- Duration: October 31 to November 27, 1965
- Arena(s): Rizal Memorial Coliseum
- Winning coach: Baby Dalupan

The 1965 UAAP men's basketball tournament was the 28th year of the men's tournament of the University Athletic Association of the Philippines (UAAP)'s basketball championship. Hosted by University of Santo Tomas, the UE Warriors defeated the UST Glowing Goldies two games to one in the best of three finals series taking their sixth overall UAAP men's basketball championship. The finals featured two future inductees to the PBA 25 Greatest Players and Hall of Fame: Danilo Florencio of UST and Robert Jaworski of UE.

== Finals ==
The best of three games for the 1965 UAAP basketball diadem went to the University of the East, but the hero of the third and decisive match came from the losing team. He was Danilo Florencio, a 19-year old UST forward, whom nobody could stop that night — except the referees. And when Coach Carlos Loyzaga’s prized rookie fouled out in the closing minute after a spectacular 40-point performance, UST's retention bid for crown crumbled under the terrific pressure put on by the mighty UE Warriors.

Although spotty officiating hurt the Goldies more than it did the Warriors — only one of the UST first stringers survived the game — UE could not be denied its hard-earned victory. But for Florencio's superb showing, Chief Warrior Robert Jaworski was the outstanding star of the evening, grabbing those rebounds like nobody's business and scattering 29 precious points, the last two of which came off Florencio's fifth and costly foul and tied the score at 84-all, with 10 seconds to go. At this stage, UST was a badly crippled lot, and Loyzaga had to scrape the bottom of a shallow bench; the reserves he sent in to face a still intact UE first team fell apart with a series of boners which enabled the Warriors to pull two sensational steals and put in four points to clinch the thrill-chocked contest.

The ending reminded fans of UST’s triumph in the first of the three-game championship series, when Florencio made two lightning interceptions in the last few seconds to give his team a hairline 69–67 victory. The Warriors evened matters in the second game, 72–65, by blanking George Lizares, one of UST’s chief gunners. And Florencio was not so hot that time, making only 17 points, most of which came rather too late to check a determined UE crew.

Ironically, that night Florencio was at his hottest — the entire UE team practically ganged up on him, to no avail — UST lost the title and made Florencio the most frustrated hero in the history of UAAP cage competitions.

Preceded by Season 27 (1964)	UAAP basketball seasons Season 28 (1965) basketball	Succeeded by Season 29 (1966)
