= UAAP Season 23 men's basketball tournament =

Basketball competition in the Philippines

1960 UAAP season
- Host school: Manila Central University
Men's Finals	G1	Wins
UE Red Warriors	87	1
FEU Tamaraws	86	0
- Duration: September 30, 1960
- Arena(s): Rizal Memorial Coliseum
- Winning coach: Baby Dalupan

The 1960 UAAP men's basketball tournament was the 23rd year of the men's tournament of the University Athletic Association of the Philippines (UAAP)'s basketball championship. Hosted by Manila Central University, the UE Warriors defeated the FEU Tamaraws in a single game finals taking their third UAAP men's basketball championship. This was the only season hosted by MCU before its pull-out from the league in 1962.

== Participating schools ==
Teams
Far Eastern University Tamaraws
Manila Central University Tigers
National University Bulldogs
University of the East Warriors
University of the Philippines Parrots
University of Santo Tomas Glowing Goldies

== Semifinals ==
The Red Warriors and the Tamaraws advance to the finals by maintaining their clean slates in the championship round. UE routed the University of the Philippines, 87-71, in the first game and FEU kicked defending champion University of Santo Tomas out of contention, 91-81, in the nightcap.

The Tamaraws broke away from a sticky fight put up by the Goldies in the early minutes of play and coasted to an easy victory on the record-breaking performance of Romy Diaz, as he scored 40 points, 29 of them in the first half. He held the record for the highest individual score in the season.

UE’s Roehl Nadurata was the season's Most Valuable Player.

== Finals ==
University of the East nosed out Far Eastern University, 87-86, to win the UAAP basketball crown before 9,000 fans at the Rizal Memorial Coliseum. A lay-up by Ramon Figueroa in the last 15 seconds of play sealed the victory for the Warriors and the four-foot El Oro trophy that went to them permanently for winning their third championship since the trophy was placed at stake. UE copped the championship in 1957 and 1958 but lost the crown to University of Santo Tomas in 1959.

A dogged stand and heads-up shooting by sophomore Rizaldo Pabillore set up the Warriors’ triumph. The Azcarraga quintet trailed the heavily-favored Tamaraws most of the way but grabbed the reins in the dying minutes of the final half. FEU led 81-75 with three minutes to play but UE staged a magnificent comeback to sew up the ball game. The rally started with a time out by coach Baby Dalupan. Norman de Vera ignited it with two charities on a foul by Rohimust Santos to narrow the gap. Pabillore kept it burning with two interceptions.

Preceded by Season 22 (1959)	UAAP basketball seasons Season 23 (1960) basketball	Succeeded by Season 24 (1961)
