= Renato Reyes =

Filipino basketball player

Personal information
- Born: September 21, 1944 Bacoor, Cavite, Commonwealth of the Philippines
- Died: June 10, 1997 (aged 52)
- Listed height: 5 ft 11 in (180 cm)
- Listed weight: 165 lb (75 kg)
Medals
Men's basketball
Representing Philippines
ABC Championship
| Gold medal – first place | 1963 Taipei | Team |
| Silver medal – second place | 1965 Kuala Lumpur | Team |
| Gold medal – first place | 1967 Seoul | Team |
| Bronze medal – third place | 1969 Bangkok | Team |

Renato "Sonny" B. Reyes Jr. (September 21, 1944 – June 10, 1997) was a Filipino basketball player who competed in the 1968 Summer Olympics.
