= Lester del Rosario =

Filipino basketball coach

Personal information
- Listed height: 5 ft 11 in (1.80 m)

Career information
- High school: UST (Manila)
- College: UST
- Position: Guard
- Number: 6

Career history

Playing
- 1998–1999: Pampanga Dragons

Coaching
- 2003: Philippines (assistant)
- 2012–2016: Perpetual (assistant)
- 2018: Paranaque Patriots (assistant)
- 2016–present: Philippine Cultural College
- 2021–2024: Pioneer ElastoSeal Katibays
- 2023–2024: UST (assistant)

Career highlights
- As player: MBA champion (1998); 3x UAAP champion (1993, 1994, 1995); As head coach: PBA 3x3 champion (2021 Second conference)
Medals
Men's basketball
Assistant coach for the Philippines
Southeast Asian Games
Gold medal – first place	2003 Hanoi	National Team

Lester Andrew del Rosario is a Filipino basketball coach known for coaching Pioneer ElastoSeal Katibays, and also served as an assistant coach for NorthPort Batang Pier.

== Playing career ==
=== UST ===
Lester del Rosario played for UST Growling Tigers under his father Aric del Rosario, and notably played with Udoy Belmonte, Patrick Fran, Rey Evangelista, Dennis Espino, and Siot Tanquingcen.

In 1992, his first year, del Rosario saw his team losing to FEU Tamaraws due to interruption by a power outage, but due to UAAP Board's decision to reschedule the last 3 minutes of the game, UST ended up losing, 76–87.

The team later won the 1993 championship by sweeping all of their opponents, and got a mythical second team. The run lasted until 1996, but in 1995, Lester became the team captain of UST.

=== Professional ===
He professional scene for Pampanga Dragons in Metropolitan Basketball Association in 1998, when they won championship under his father's tutelage.

== Coaching career ==
=== Father's assistant ===
Del Rosario served as an assistant to his father when it was appointed as head coach of the Philippine team for the 2003 SEA Games.

He later served as an assistant for Perpetual Altas, with future PBA star Scottie Thompson as one of its star players.

He also served as an assistant for Parañaque Patriots.

=== Head coaching ===
Del Rosario served as head coach for Pioneer ElastoSeal Katibays, A PBA 3x3 team, and won a championship in 2021 second conference.

He is currently coaching the Philippine Cultural College HS since 2016.

Concurrently, he is an assistant coach for UST Growling Tigers.
