= UAAP Season 27 men's basketball tournament =

Basketball competition in the Philippines

1964 UAAP season
- Host school: University of the East
Men's Finals	G1	G2	G3	Wins
UST Glowing Goldies	60	58	71	2
FEU Tamaraws	55	69	68	1
- Duration: October 1964
- Arena(s): Rizal Memorial Coliseum
- Winning coach: Carlos Loyzaga

The 1964 UAAP men's basketball tournament was the 27th year of the men's tournament of the University Athletic Association of the Philippines (UAAP)'s basketball championship. Hosted by University of the East, the UST Glowing Goldies defeated the FEU Tamaraws in the best of three finals series two games to one taking their twelfth overall UAAP men's basketball championship.

== Elimination round ==
Tournament format: Teams play a double round robin. The winner of the first round play the winner of the second round in a best of three championship to determine the champion. Ties for round winners are broken by knockout games.

If a team wins both rounds, it is automatically declared the champion, regardless if it was a sweep or not. If a team fails to win either rounds, but ends up with a better over-all record than either of the round winners, that team will challenge the second round winner for a championship slot against the first round winner.

== Finals ==
October 1964

UST Glowing Goldies	60–55	FEU Tamaraws

Rizal Memorial Coliseum, Manila

October 1964

UST Glowing Goldies	58–69	FEU Tamaraws

Rizal Memorial Coliseum, Manila

October 1964

UST Glowing Goldies	71–68	FEU Tamaraws
UST wins series 2–1

Rizal Memorial Coliseum, Manila

UST won Game 1, 60-55, but FEU forced the decider with a 69-58 win. Ceferino dela Paz scored the marginal points as UST frustrated FEU in the winner-take-all match, 71-68. The series was dubbed as the most exhilarating UAAP conquest in the post war featuring two players who would be future champion coaches of their respective schools: Aric del Rosario of UST, and Danny Gavieres of FEU.

Preceded by Season 26 (1963)	UAAP basketball seasons Season 27 (1964) basketball	Succeeded by Season 28 (1965)
