= Antonio Martínez (basketball) =

Filipino basketball player

Antonio Luis Martínez
Personal information
- Born: May 20, 1926 Manila, Philippine Islands
- Died: December 26, 2016 (aged 90)
- Listed height: 178 cm (5 ft 10 in)

Career information
- College: San Beda
- Position: Guard

Career history
- 1949: PRATRA
- 1954: Philippine Airlines
- 1955–1968: YCO Painters
Medals
Men's basketball
Representing Philippines
Asian Games
Gold medal – first place	1951 New Delhi	Team

Antonio Luis "Pocholo" Martínez (June 20, 1926 – December 26, 2016) was a Filipino basketball player who competed in the 1948 Summer Olympics and the 1952 Summer Olympics.

== Biography ==
Martínez usually played guard and saw action in the first Asian Games in New Delhi in 1951 and the 1952 Summer Olympics in Helsinki. He played for De La Salle before the last war. It was during the war years that he took up the game. After liberation, Martínez played for the San Beda junior team under coach Arturo Rius from whom he learned the fundamentals of basketball. There was no NCAA at that time so he played against American teams which belonged to the liberation forces.

He then transferred to University of Santo Tomas to take up commerce. In 1949, he played for PRATRA in the MICAA along with playing coach Gabby Fajardo and among others, Ning and Emy Ramos, Pong Bautista and Peping Tuason. In 1954, Martinez played for Philippine Air Lines, and then stayed with the YCO Painters from 1955-1968. By the time he retired, Martínez had participated in at least five championships.
