= Ignacio Ramos (basketball) =

Filipino basketball player and coach

Career information
- College: Ateneo

Career history

Coaching
- 1972–1977: Royal Tru-Orange
Medals
Men's basketball
Representing Philippines
Asian Games
Gold medal – first place	1951 New Delhi	Team
Gold medal – first place	1954 Manila	Team
Head coach for Philippines
ABC Championship
Silver medal – second place	1971 Tokyo	Team

Ignacio "Ning" R. Ramos (died June 22, 2012) was a Filipino basketball player and coach.

Ramos played for the Ateneo Blue Eagles in the NCAA from 1949 to 1950. He was part of the Philippine national basketball team that captured the gold medal at the 1951 Asian Games in New Delhi, India.

Ramos coached the San Miguel Corporation teams in the Manila Industrial and Commercial Athletic Association and the Philippine Basketball Association. Ramos was also the head coach of the national basketball team that participated in the 1972 Summer Olympics.
