= Jacinto Ciria Cruz =

Filipino basketball player

Personal information
- Born: August 16, 1910 Pandacan, Manila, Philippine Islands
- Died: December 25, 1944 Bayombong, Nueva Ecija, Philippine Commonwealth

Career information
- College: UST

Career history

Coaching
- UST
- Letran

Jacinto "Jumping Jack" Ciria Cruz (August 16, 1910 – December 25, 1944) was a Filipino basketball player and coach. Ciria Cruz played for the University of Santo Tomas men's basketball team. He was part of the team that won the gold medal in the 1930 and 1934 Far Eastern Games and also represented the Philippines at the 1936 Summer Olympics as a member of the country's national basketball team. He later ventured into coaching different collegiate squads.

In 1938, Ciria Cruz took over as Letran basketball coach from Herminio Silva, who had earlier inherited the job from Ciria Cruz when the latter played in the Berlin Olympics. It was the year Letran won its first NCAA cage title.

He was killed during World War II.
