= UAAP Season 55 men's basketball tournament =

Basketball competition in the Philippines

1992 UAAP season
- Host school: University of Santo Tomas
Men's Finals	G1	G2	Wins
Adamson Soaring Falcons	59	83	0+1
FEU Tamaraws	69	94	2
- Duration: October 10–14, 1992
- Arena(s): Loyola Center
- Winning coach: Alfredo Amador

UAAP Season 55 is the 1992–93 athletic year of the University Athletic Association of the Philippines. This season was hosted by the University of Santo Tomas.

== Men's basketball ==
The UAAP men's basketball competition opened on July 18 at the Araneta Coliseum. The year's host, UST, marked their first year of carrying their new moniker - Growling Tiger, to replace their former moniker of the Glowing Goldies. De La Salle University, declared champion by the Basketball Association of the Philippines (BAP) headed by president Lito Puyat, hired a new coach in Gabby Velasco, who replaced incumbent Derrick Pumaren. Far Eastern University, the UAAP board's recognized champion, lost the services of power forward Victor Pablo from graduation.

=== Team standings ===
Pos	Team	W	L	Pts	Qualification
1	Adamson Falcons	11	3	25 (Note: Adamson clinches #1 seed automatically by way of superior quotient; second-seed playoff: FEU 101–87 La Salle)	Twice-to-beat in the Finals
2	FEU Tamaraws	11	3	25	Twice-to-win in the Finals
3	De La Salle Green Archers	11	3	25	
4	UST Growling Tigers (H)	10	4	24	
5	Ateneo Blue Eagles	6	8	20	
6	UP Fighting Maroons	5	9	19	
7	UE Red Warriors	1	13	15	
8	NU Bulldogs	1	13	15	

Rules for classification: 1) winning percentage; 2) if tied for #2, one-game playoff; 3) head-to-head record; 4) head-to-head point differential; 5) overall point differential
(H) Hosts
Notes:

The Adamson Falcons of coach Orly Bauzon clinched the first finals berth by way of superior quotient, which was made possible by FEU's 87–76 win over UST in their final elimination assignment. This was marked by the game's last three minutes and forty-seven seconds were replayed due to a power failure at the venue.

The FEU Tamaraws advanced to the championship against Adamson Falcons by defeating the De La Salle Green Archers, 101–87, in a playoff. The Tamaraws, coached by Alfredo Amador, scored a two-game sweep over the Falcons to retain the senior's basketball title.

=== Second seed playoff ===
October 5

FEU Tamaraws	101–87	De La Salle Green Archers

Loyola Center, Quezon City

=== Finals ===
October 10

Adamson Falcons	59–69	FEU Tamaraws

Loyola Center, Quezon City

October 14

Adamson Falcons	83–94	FEU Tamaraws
FEU wins series in two games

Loyola Center, Quezon City

== See also ==
- NCAA Season 68 basketball tournaments
