= Gabriel Fajardo =

Filipino basketball player

Gabriel Rodriguez Fajardo (March 24, 1917 in Pandacan, Manila – July 19, 2008 in Pasig) was a Filipino basketball player who competed in the 1948 Summer Olympics in London, England.

Fajardo began playing basketball at the Mapa High School at the age of 14. He also played baseball and volleyball. In 1935, he enrolled at the University of Santo Tomas where he finished his commerce studies. He shifted to education and was a member of the 1939 varsity team that won the Big Three (UST, UP and NU) championship. After the end of World War II, he rejoined the UST team in 1947.

Fajardo was named to the Philippine team in the 1948 London Olympics and was so impressive that upon his return, he got the distinction of being the first to be named "Mr. Basketball" by the Philippine Sportswriters Association.

In 1949, he joined the PRATA (Philippine Relief and Trade Rehabilitation Administration) team as a playing coach in the MICAA and led his team to the championship. With him were other outstanding players like Florentino Bautista, Nano Tolentino, Baby Dalupan, Ning Ramos and Caloy Loyzaga. In 1952, Fajardo coached the PRISCO (Price Stabilization Corporation) team, successor of the PRATA team, to three titles on the same year - the MICAA, the National Open and the Challenge to Champions.
