= Francisco Vestil =

Filipino basketball player (1914–2000)

Personal information
- Born: September 17, 1914 Mambaling, Cebu City, Philippine Islands
- Died: May 28, 2000 (aged 85) Cebu City, Philippines

Career information
- High school: Visayan Institute (Cebu City)
- College: UST

Francisco Sanchez Vestil (September 17, 1914 – May 28, 2000) was a Filipino basketball player who competed in the 1948 Summer Olympics. Vestil was the flag bearer of the Philippine delegation at the 1948 Summer Olympics.

Before Vestil started his career in basketball, he was a baggage carrier who carried maguey leaves to the roof for drying. He started his basketball career and Cebu and received attention in his basketball career when he won the National Open Basketball Championships in 1938 as a guest player for the Visayan Institute.

University of Santo Tomas (UST) basketball coach Jose Rodriguez urged him to enroll at the institution. Vestil finished his high school studies in UST. He helped UST win titles at the UAAP and National Open Championships from 1930 to 1940. Vestil also helped UST win its post-World War II title at the UAAP in 1946.

Several months before his death, Vestil was bedridden due to complications from multiple strokes.

The F. Vestil Street, which was a formerly unnamed road that connected the Cebu South Road Properties with his native Mambaling, was named in his honor on January 15, 2015.
