= Primitivo Martínez =

Filipino basketball player

Primitivo "Tibing" Martínez (September 24, 1912, in Ormoc, Leyte – May 19, 1985, in San Francisco, California, U.S.) was a Filipino basketball player who competed in the 1936 Summer Olympics and in the 1948 Summer Olympics.
