= 1999 UST Growling Tigers basketball team =

Men's college basketball team season

1999 UST Growling Tigers men's basketball

UAAP Season 62 runner-up

Record
- Elims rank: #T–1
- Final rank: #2
- 1999 record: 13–6 (11–3 elims)
- Head coach: Aric del Rosario (13th season)
- Assistant coaches: Dong Vergeire; Boy Ong
- Captain: Gelo Velasco (5th season)

The 1999 UST Growling Tigers men's basketball team represented University of Santo Tomas in the 62nd season of the University Athletic Association of the Philippines. The men's basketball tournament for the school year 1999–2000 began on July 10, 1999, and the host school for the season was the University of the Philippines.

The Tigers made it back to the Finals for the first time since winning the championship in 1996 after finishing the double round-robin eliminations at joint first place with the De La Salle Green Archers with 11 wins against 3 losses. UST went undefeated in their first ten games for their best start since the 1994 season, when they compiled a 17–0 record that stretched back from their undefeated 1993 campaign. Their ten-game winning streak was snapped by the UE Red Warriors in the second round of eliminations after the Warriors converted a three-point basket to break their 71–all tie in the dying seconds of the game.

Their second-round game against the Ateneo Blue Eagles at the Cuneta Astrodome was marred by a melee after the referees failed to control the players' physicality, prompting game officials to reset the remaining last quarter a week later. The game was played behind closed doors at the Lyceum Gym, where the Tigers lost, 60–63.

The Tigers lost the playoff for the #1 seed, even as the Green Archers missed the services of Don Allado and Dino Aldeguer, who both got stranded in traffic on their way to the game venue. UST met the third-seeded Blue Eagles in the Final Four and won, 75–74.

The best-of-three Finals series was extended to a third and deciding game with the Tigers winning Game 1, after the Archers' Aldeguer missed his three-point shot to preserve UST's 62–60 lead; and with La Salle taking Game 2 as the Archers' Mac Cuan towed his team to an 81–74 win with his clutch free throws. Game 3 went into overtime with La Salle winning, 78–75.

Third-year forward Marvin Ortiguerra was selected to the Mythical team at the tournament's presentation of awards.

== Roster ==
Following the amendment of 33 league rules by the UAAP board, 16 players are now allowed in the lineup per team from the previous limit of 14.

UST Growling Tigers roster
Players
Coaches

Pos.	No.	Nat.	Name	Height	Year	High School
PG	4	(Philippines)	Glenn John Manching	6'1" (1.85m)	1st	University of the Visayas
PG	5	(Philippines)	Jake Westley Agleron	5'9" (1.75m)	2nd	San Sebastian College-Recoletos
PG	6	(Philippines)	Angelo Velasco (C)	5'9" (1.75m)	5th	St. Francis High School
C	7	(Philippines)	Marvin Ortiguerra	6'5" (1.96m)	3rd	Mapúa Institute of Technology
SG	8	(Philippines)	Cyrus Baguio	6'2" (1.88m)	2nd	Southwestern University
C	9	(Philippines)	Gilbert Lao	6'7" (2.01m)	3rd	Uno High School
SG	10	(Philippines)	Frederic Jamison Hubalde	6'1" (1.85m)	1st	Mapúa Institute of Technology
PF	11	(Philippines)	Jose Valeriano	6'3" (1.91m)	1st	–
C	12	(Philippines)	Alwyn Espiritu	6'5" (1.96m)	1st	University of Santo Tomas
SF	14	(Philippines)	Niño Greggy Gelig	6'2" (1.88m)	2nd	Holy Angel University
PG	15	(Philippines)	Jino Manansala	5'8" (1.73m)	1st	Burlington County, New Jersey
SG	16	(Philippines)	Kelwin Jansen Ang	5'10" (1.78m)	1st	University of Santo Tomas
PF	17	(Philippines)	Melchor Latoreno	6'5" (1.96m)	4th	University of Santo Tomas
SF	18	(Philippines)	Emmerson Oreta	6'3" (1.91m)	3rd	University of Santo Tomas
PG	19	(Philippines)	Erwin de Leon	5'11" (1.8m)	1st	–
PF	20	(Philippines)	Iago Jaime Raterta	6'3" (1.91m)	1st	–

Head coach

- (Philippines) Januario del Rosario

Assistant coach(es)

- Edward Vergeire
- Eusebio Ong

Team manager

- Benito Lim
- Timmy Koh Teng Chong

Legend

- (C) Team captain
- Injured

- Roster

=== Depth chart ===
Pos.	Starting 5	Bench 1	Bench 2
C	Lao	Latoreno	Espiritu
PF	Ortiguerra	Valeriano
SF	Baguio	Oreta
SG	Gelig	Hubalde
PG	Velasco	Agleron

== Roster changes ==
Four players from the 1996 champion team have departed, as Dale Singson, Richard Yee, Gerard Francisco, and Lonlon Talaga have already graduated, leaving senior point guard Gelo Velasco the remaining Tiger with a championship experience.

Velasco will be joined by former UST Tiger Cub Alwyn Espiritu and former Mapua Red Robin Derick Hubalde, both coming off as the 1998 Most Valuable Player awardees in their respective leagues, as well as the duo of two other former high school MVPs in Marvin Ortiguerra and Emmerson Oreta, and the high-flying tandem of Cyrus Baguio and Niño Gelig.

=== Subtractions ===
Pos.	No.	Nat.	Player	Height	Year	High school	Notes
SF	8	(Philippines)	Ramon Talaga, III	6' 0"	4th		Graduated
PG	10	(Philippines)	Ramon Singson	5' 11"	5th	Mandaue Academy	Graduated
SF	11	(Philippines)	Gerard Raymond Francisco	6' 3"	4th	University of Santo Tomas	Graduated
PF	14	(Philippines)	Richard Yee	6' 4"	5th	Antique National School	Graduated
C	15	(Philippines)	Mark Joseph Kong	6' 8"	2nd	University of Santo Tomas	Transferred to De La Salle University
SG	16	(Philippines)	Arnulfo Roan Tuadles, Jr.	6' 1"	2nd	Saint Francis of Assisi College	Relegated to Team B

=== Additions ===
Pos.	No.	Nat.	Player	Height	Year	High school	Notes
PG	4	(Philippines)	Glenn John Manching	6' 1"	1st	University of the Visayas	Rookie
SG	10	(Philippines)	Frederic Jamison Hubalde	6' 1"	1st	Mapúa Institute of Technology	Rookie
PF	11	(Philippines)	Jose Valeriano	6' 3"	1st		Promoted from Team B
C	12	(Philippines)	Alwyn Espiritu	6' 5"	1st	University of Santo Tomas	Rookie
PG	15	(Philippines)	Jino Manansala	5' 8"	1st	Burlington County, New Jersey	Rookie
SG	16	(Philippines)	Kelwin Jansen Ang	5' 10"	1st	University of Santo Tomas	Rookie
PG	19	(Philippines)	Erwin de Leon	5' 11"	1st		Promoted from Team B
PF	20	(Philippines)	Iago Jaime Raterta	6' 3"	1st		Rookie

== Schedule and results ==
Elimination games were played in a double round-robin format. All games were aired on PTV 4 by Silverstar Sports.

UAAP Season 62 game log

Elimination round: 11–3
Game	Date • Time	Opponent	Result	Record	High points	High rebounds	High assists	Location
1	Jul 10 • 3:00 pm	FEU Tamaraws	W 69–67	1–0	Tied (13)			PhilSports Arena; Pasig
2	Jul 15 • 1:00 pm	Adamson Soaring Falcons	W 69–59	2–0				Loyola Center; Quezon City
3	Jul 17 • 3:30 pm	De La Salle Green Archers	W 61–59	3–0				Loyola Center; Quezon City
4	Jul 24 • 3:30 pm	Ateneo Blue Eagles	W 71–57	4–0	Gelig (14)			Loyola Center; Quezon City
5	Jul 29 • 1:00 pm	NU Bulldogs	W 88–82^{OT}	5–0				Loyola Center; Quezon City
6	Jul 31 • 1:30 pm	UP Fighting Maroons	W 80–66	6–0				Cuneta Astrodome; Pasay
7	Aug 10 • 3:30 pm	UE Red Warriors; End of R1 of eliminations	W 69–62	7–0				Ninoy Aquino Stadium Manila
8	Aug 18 • 1:00 pm	UP Fighting Maroons	W 77–62	8–0				Loyola Center; Quezon City
9	Aug 22 • 1:00 pm	Adamson Soaring Falcons	W 73–67	9–0				Loyola Center; Quezon City
10	Aug 29 • 3:30 pm	FEU Tamaraws	W 86–69	10–0				Loyola Center; Quezon City
11	Sep 1 • 1:00 pm	UE Red Warriors	L 71–74	10–1				Loyola Center; Quezon City
	Sep 4 • 1:00 pm	Ateneo Blue Eagles	Game suspended at 8:25 (2nd half) due to unruly crowd; UST leads, 50–46					Cuneta Astrodome; Pasay
12	Sep 7 • 1:00 pm	NU Bulldogs	W 60–43	11–1				Ninoy Aquino Stadium Manila
13	Sep 11 • 3:00 pm	De La Salle Green Archers	L 69–78	11–2				Loyola Center; Quezon City
14	Sep 14 • 3:00 pm	Ateneo Blue Eagles; End of R2 of eliminations	L 60–63	11–3				Lyceum Gym; Manila

Playoff for #1 seed: 0–1
Game	Date • Time	Seed	Opponent	Result	Series	High points	High rebounds	High assists	Location
1	Sep 18 • 3:30 pm		De La Salle Green Archers	L 79–84	0–1 (11–4)				Loyola Center; Quezon City

Final Four: 1–0
Game	Date • Time	Seed	Opponent	Result	Series	High points	High rebounds	High assists	Location
1	Sep 23 • 1:00 pm	(#2)	(#3) Ateneo Blue Eagles	W 75–74	1–0 (12–4)				PhilSports Arena; Pasig

Finals: 1–2
Game	Date • Time	Seed	Opponent	Result	Series	High points	High rebounds	High assists	Location
1	Sep 30 • 3:30 pm	(#2)	(#1) De La Salle Green Archers	W 62–60	1–0 (13–4)		Ortiguerra (8)		PhilSports Arena; Pasig
2	Oct 2 • 3:30 pm	(#2)	(#1) De La Salle Green Archers	L 74–81	1–1 (13–5)				PhilSports Arena; Pasig
3	Oct 9 • 3:30 pm	(#2)	(#1) De La Salle Green Archers	L 75–78^{OT}	1–2 (13–6)	Ortiguerra (18)	Ortiguerra (13)		Cuneta Astrodome Pasay

(#) Tournament seedings in parentheses.
All times are in UTC+08:00.
Source: UBelt.com (archived)

=== Summary ===
Finals, Game 3

	1	2	OT	Total
UST	40	27	8	75
La Salle	43	24	11	78

The best-of-three Finals series was extended to a third and deciding game, with both teams taking one game apiece. In the deciding third game, the Tigers began an 8-0 run before La Salle's Renren Ritualo scored a jumper, five minutes after tip-off. Three more successive baskets by the Archers tied the score, followed by a series of misses and turnovers by both teams. The Archers' Dino Aldeguer next scored a three-point play for a 9-4 La Salle count, with UST still leading, 17-15. La Salle's Willy Wilson then scored his own three-point play to pull his team ahead, 18-17.

UST at this juncture went on a series of missed jump shots, which prompted head coach Aric del Rosario to point out to his team how they were more effective in scoring from under the basket. Statistics would back-up Del Rosario's claim, as they lead over the Archers in inside point production for the first half, 34-18.

"The jump shot is not our first option. We've been taking too many attempts. We're just lucky that they're going in, but I want you to take it strong to the hoop"

— Aric del Rosario to his players

The Tigers yielded their biggest deficit at the half when Niño Gelig missed a three-point attempt and a rebound by the Archers' Mac Cuan resulted to a Ritualo fast break, scoring on a two-handed bank shot as he eluded two UST defenders for a six-point La Salle lead. Two successive undergoal stabs by Marvin Ortiguerra pulled the Tigers to within two at 38-40. Ritualo then fired a three with 45 seconds remaining at the half, and was countered by Ortiguerra's basket, as he forced the goal from a near-botched play for a 40-43 count. Wilson next missed his shot which was rebounded by UST as the first half buzzer sounded.

Cyrus Baguio began the second half with a break away two-handed slam. UST tied the score after Baguio converted both free throws off a Francis Zamora foul. Two consecutive three-point shots by Derick Hubalde pulled UST to a ten-point lead at 63-53, with five minutes left in the game. The Archers went on an 9-1 run before a two-minute scoring drought between the two teams, UST still leading at 64-62. Gilbert Lao was fouled by Wilson while the two were trying to grab a missed La Salle shot, at the 1:42 mark. Lao split his free throws for a 65-62 Tigers lead. Aldeguer next converted on a jumper to trail UST by one point.

Gelig was then fouled by Ritualo while attempting a putback, with 44.6 seconds remauning. He missed the first and converted the second free throw for a 66-64 count. La Salle's Allado missed at the post and a jump ball was called at the rebound, with 29.2 seconds left. Baguio and La Salle's Mon Jose contested the tip-off, which was tapped to Ritualo, who missed a ten-foot jump shot from the left flank. Allado missed once again, this time on a putback attempt, with Lao collaring the rebound. He was fouled by Allado at the 19.5-second mark. He missed the first free throw and the second shot circled twice around the rim before falling in. Allado quickly inbouded the ball to Aldeguer, who in turn made a dash to the front court and passed to Ritualo who was being double-teamed by UST. He tried to dribble to the right corner of the three-point arc, but could not elude his two defenders. He kicked out to Allado, who drew another double-team from the Tigers' Gelig, who had run and left Aldeguer open. Aldeguer got the pass from Allado and immediately threw the shot from beyond the arc and converted while also getting fouled by Gelig, 2.7 seconds left in the clock. The score was tied at 67–all, as Aldeguer took his bonus shot but missed. He was able to rebound his own miss but threw an air ball as time expired.

The overtime tip-off was won by Zamora, who quickly passed to a sprinting Aldeguer for a two-point basket. A steal off Velasco set off another fast break by La Salle, with Ritualo passing to Aldeguer again for another basket. Velasco dribbled the ball slowly to UST's front court, but suddenly pulled up to release a three-point shot in front of Aldeguer for a 70–71 count. Allado was partially blocked by Ortiguerra and a Baseball pass to Gelig pulled UST ahead, 72–71. An errant pass by Jose to Allado was intercepted by Gelig, but Ortiguerra missed his looper which was contested by Allado. Aldeguer got the rebound and Ritualo was able to weave through UST's defense for a layup. A driving Hubalde drop-passed to an open Lao, but missed his shot, point-blank. The Archers committed two fouls in succession, one called on Allado during the rebound, and another on Wilson, who had tried to stop Ortiguerra in the ensuing post up play. Ortiguerra split his free throws to tie the score at 73–all. Lao then stole off Jose from under La Salle's basket and Ortiguerra was fouled again, with Aldeguer committing his last foul. Two converted free throws sent UST ahead momentarily, as Allado equalized on their next possession. Velasco missed a contested double-pump as Wilson collared the rebound. Ritualo drove and threw an awkward shot to send La Salle to a 77–75 lead, 29.5 seconds remaining.

Coach Aric called for timeout as Dong Vergeire drew the play for their offense. Velasco, who received the inbound pass from the backcourt, dribbled all the way to the basket, but missed an off-balanced shot. Lao was called for his fifth foul as he tried to flag the dribbling Cuan to stop the clock at 11.6 seconds. Cuan split his charities, missing the first and then converting the second. Velasco missed his three-point shot attempt as the buzzer sounded, yielding a 75–78 loss and the championship to La Salle.

== Awards ==
Name	Award	Date	Ref.
Team	UAAP runner-up trophy	9 Oct 1999	
Marvin Ortiguerra	Mythical team	2 Oct 1999	

== Players drafted into the PBA ==
Gelo Velasco was picked 13th overall in the 2000 PBA draft by the Eric Altamirano-led Mobiline Phone Pals on January 9, 2000.

Year	Round	Pick	Overall	Player	PBA team
2000	2	3	13	Gelo Velasco	Mobiline Phone Pals
