= 1997 UST Growling Tigers basketball team =

1997 UST Growling Tigers men's basketball

UAAP Season 60 semifinalist

Record
- Elims rank: #2
- Final rank: #3
- 1997 record: 10–6 (10–4 elims)
- Head coach: Aric del Rosario (11th season)
- Assistant coaches: Dong Vergeire; Binky Favis

The 1997 UST Growling Tigers men's basketball team represented University of Santo Tomas in the 60th season of the University Athletic Association of the Philippines. The men's basketball tournament for the school year 1997–98 began on July 12, 1997, and the host school for the season was Adamson University.

UST won their last six games after suffering back-to-back losses in between the two rounds of the double round-robin eliminations, for a second-place finish with 10 wins against 4 losses. The De La Salle Green Archers had the same win–loss record but were ranked lower on an inferior -5 quotient.

Two of their games went into overtime, with both resulting to wins over the FEU Tamaraws, 79–71 in the first round; and against the UE Red Warriors, 85–77 in the second round.

The Tigers lost their Final Four match against La Salle, their recurrent playoff opponent since 1994. UST squandered their twice-to-beat advantage with a 73–82 loss, resulting to a knockout game, where they were eventually eliminated after a 72–74 overtime loss.

== Roster ==
UST Growling Tigers roster
Players
Coaches

Pos.	No.	Nat.	Name	Height	Year	High School
PF	4	(Philippines)	Emmerson Oreta	6'3" (1.91m)	1st	University of Santo Tomas
SF	5	(Philippines)	John Dale Valena	6'0" (1.83m)	2nd	University of Santo Tomas
C	6	(Philippines)	Gilbert Lao	6'7" (2.01m)	1st	Uno High School
C	7	(Philippines)	Marvin Ortiguerra	6'5" (1.96m)	1st	Mapúa Institute of Technology
SF	8	(Philippines)	Ramon Talaga, III	6'0" (1.83m)	3rd	–
SG	9	(Philippines)	Romel David	5'10" (1.78m)	5th	Mapúa Institute of Technology
PG	10	(Philippines)	Ramon Singson	5'11" (1.8m)	4th	Mandaue Academy
SG	11	(Philippines)	Richard Melencio	5'9" (1.75m)	4th	San Beda College
SF	12	(Philippines)	Gerard Raymond Francisco	6'3" (1.91m)	3rd	University of Santo Tomas
PF	13	(Philippines)	Ryan Bernardo	6'5" (1.96m)	1st	–
PF	14	(Philippines)	Richard Yee (injured)	6'4" (1.93m)	4th	Antique National School
C	17	(Philippines)	Melchor Latoreno	6'5" (1.96m)	2nd	University of Santo Tomas
SG	18	(Philippines)	Henry Ong	5'11" (1.8m)	5th	Mapúa Institute of Technology
SG	20	(Philippines)	Angelo Velasco	5'9" (1.75m)	3rd	St. Francis High School

Head coach

- (Philippines) Januario del Rosario

Assistant coach(es)

- Edward Vergeire
- Vincent Kenneth Favis

Legend

- (C) Team captain
- Injured

=== Depth chart ===
Pos.	Starting 5	Bench 1	Bench 2
C	Ortiguerra	Latoreno	Lao
PF	Oreta	Bernardo
SF	Francisco	David	Valena
SG	Melencio	Ong	Talaga
PG	Singson	Velasco

== Roster changes ==
The Tigers lost team captain and Season 58 MVP Chris Cantonjos to graduation, as well as Mythical team awardee Estong Ballesteros, who decided to join the 1997 PBA Rookie Draft. In their place, UST was able to recruit blue chips from the high school ranks, with UST Tiger Cub Emmerson Oreta who was hailed the UAAP Season 59 Juniors MVP and Mapúa High School's Marvin Ortiguerra, the Juniors MVP of the NCAA in Season 71 coming onboard.

=== Subtractions ===
Pos.	No.	Nat.	Player	Height	Year	High school	Notes
PG	4	(Philippines)	Francis Mangyao	6' 0"	4th	University of Southern Philippines Foundation	Transferred to Saint Francis of Assisi College
C	15	(Philippines)	Christopher Cantonjos	6' 6"	4th	Colegio de San Juan de Letran	Graduated
PF	16	(Philippines)	Ernesto Ballesteros	6' 4"	4th	Mapúa Institute of Technology	Left team to turn professional
C	19	(United States)	Chandler Tyrone Donaldson	6' 5"	4th		Out due to a slipped disc injury

=== Additions ===
Pos.	No.	Nat.	Player	Height	Year	High school	Notes
PF	4	(Philippines)	Emmerson Oreta	6' 3"	1st	University of Santo Tomas	Rookie
C	6	(Philippines)	Gilbert Lao	6' 7"	1st	Uno High School	Rookie
C	7	(Philippines)	Marvin Ortiguerra	6' 5"	1st	Mapúa Institute of Technology	Rookie
PF	13	(Philippines)	Ryan Bernardo	6' 5"	1st		Rookie

== Schedule and results ==
=== Preseason tournament ===
Preseason game log

1997 Fr. Martin Cup: 6–2
Game	Date • Time	Opponent	Result	Record	High points	High rebounds	High assists	Location
6	May 30	Letran Knights	L 76–85	5–1				Loyola Center; Quezon City
7	Jun 1	Ateneo Blue Eagles	L 68–73	5–2	Francisco (15)			Loyola Center; Quezon City
8	Jun 4	San Sebastian Stags	W 79–64	6–2	David (16)			Loyola Center; Quezon City

(#) Tournament seedings in parentheses.
All times are in UTC+08:00.

=== UAAP games ===
Elimination games were played in a double round-robin format. All games were aired on PTV 4 by Silverstar Sports.

UAAP Season 60 game log

Elimination round: 10–4
Game	Date • Time	Opponent	Result	Record	High points	High rebounds	High assists	Location
1	Jul 12 • 6:00 pm	UP Fighting Maroons	L 56–63	0–1	Melencio (14)			Araneta Coliseum; Quezon City
2	Jul 17 • 6:00 pm	Ateneo Blue Eagles	W 70–59	1–1	Francisco (16)			Ninoy Aquino Stadium Manila
3	Jul 24 • 3:30 pm	Adamson Soaring Falcons	W 81–65	2–1	Latoreno (16)			Loyola Center; Quezon City
4	Jul 27	FEU Tamaraws	W 79–71^{OT}	3–1	Melencio (13)	Melencio (6)		Ninoy Aquino Stadium Manila
5	Aug 3	NU Bulldogs	L 62–68	3–2				Ninoy Aquino Stadium Manila
6	Aug 7	UE Red Warriors	W 67–66	4–2				Ninoy Aquino Stadium Manila
7	Aug 7 • 6:00 pm	De La Salle Green Archers; End of R1 of eliminations	L 57–64	4–3				Ninoy Aquino Stadium Manila
8	Aug 21	FEU Tamaraws	L 62–68	4–4				Ninoy Aquino Stadium Manila
9	Aug 30	UE Red Warriors	W 85–77	5–4	Melencio (23)	Melencio (5)	Melencio (2)	Ninoy Aquino Stadium Manila
10	Sep 6 • 6:00 pm	Adamson Soaring Falcons	W 66–65	6–4				Araneta Coliseum; Quezon City
11	Sep 22	NU Bulldogs	W 65–59	7–4	Tied (12)	Melencio (4)	Singson (4)	Adamson University Gym Manila
12	Sep 25 • 6:00 pm	Ateneo Blue Eagles	W 70–52	8–4				Ninoy Aquino Stadium Manila
13	Sep 27 • 4:00 pm	De La Salle Green Archers	W 70–58	9–4				Loyola Center; Quezon City
14	Sep 30 • 3:00 pm	UP Fighting Maroons; End of R2 of eliminations	W 80–71	10–4	Melencio (18)	Melencio (5)	Ong (3)	Loyola Center; Quezon City

Final Four: 0–2
Game	Date • Time	Seed	Opponent	Result	Series	High points	High rebounds	High assists	Location
1	Oct 2 • 3:30 pm	(#2)	(#3) De La Salle Green Archers	L 73–82	0–1 (10–5)				Araneta Coliseum; Quezon City
2	Oct 4 • 2:00 pm	(#2)	(#3) De La Salle Green Archers	L 72–74^{OT}	0–1 (10–6)				Araneta Coliseum; Quezon City

(#) Tournament seedings in parentheses.
All times are in UTC+08:00.
Source: UBelt.com (archived)

=== Postseason tournaments ===
Postseason game log

Philippine Invitational Basketball Championship: 0–2
Game	Date • Time	Opponent	Result	Record	High points	High rebounds	High assists	Location
1	Dec 2 • 5:00 pm	FEU Tamaraws; Semifinal round	L 65–81	0–1				Ninoy Aquino Stadium; Manila
2	Dec 3 • 2:45 pm	SWU Cobras; Semifinal round	L 61–81	0–2				Ninoy Aquino Stadium; Manila

1997 National Intercollegiate Basketball Championships—NCR leg: 3–2
Game	Date • Time	Opponent	Result	Record	High points	High rebounds	High assists	Location
1	Dec 1	San Beda Red Lions	W 74–72	1–0				Rizal Memorial Coliseum Manila
2	Dec 2	CCP Bobcats	W 103–85	2–0	David (22)			Rizal Memorial Coliseum Manila
3	Dec 3	NU Bulldogs	W 78–60	3–0	Tied (16)			Rizal Memorial Coliseum Manila
4	Dec 5	UM Hawks	L 65–85	3–1	David (15)			Rizal Memorial Coliseum Manila
5	Dec 9	San Beda Red Lions	L 75–76^{OT}	3–2	Francisco (25)			Rizal Memorial Coliseum Manila

(#) Tournament seedings in parentheses.
All times are in UTC+08:00.

== Players drafted into the PBA ==
Richard Melencio and Ryan Bernardo decided to turn professional after the 1997 season and signed with the Metropolitan Basketball Association's Pangasinan Presidents and Laguna Lakers teams respectively. Both players later applied for the PBA draft, with Bernardo getting picked in the fourth round in 2001 by the Louie Alas-led Mobiline Phone Pals, and Melencio landing the 32nd overall pick in 2002 with the Shell Turbo Chargers team.

Year	Round	Pick	Overall	Player	PBA team
2001	4	4	34	Ryan Bernardo	Mobiline Phone Pals
2002	4	6	32	Richard Melencio	Shell Turbo Chargers
