= UAAP tennis championships =

Tennis championship

Tennis has been a sport in the program of the University Athletic Association of the Philippines (UAAP) men's division since the 1949–1950 season. The women's tennis competition started in the 2001–2002 season.

== Tournament format ==
There are two championships contested, one for men, and another for women. A tournament is akin to the Davis Cup and the Billie Jean King Cup, where a tie consists of up to five matches, each best-of-three sets. The first three matches are singles, and the last 2 matches, if necessary, are doubles. Teams then play a double round-robin tournament, where the teams are ranked by ties won. The top four teams then qualify to the playoffs under the UAAP Final Four format.

There are no separate singles and doubles championships, nor are mixed doubles are held.

== Champions list ==
Denotes school won both men's and women's championship in the same year

Academic Year	Men's	Women's
12 (1949–50)	Far Eastern University	
13 (1950–51)	Far Eastern University	
14 (1951–52)	Far Eastern University	
15 (1952–53)	Far Eastern University	
16 (1953–54)	Far Eastern University	
17 (1954–55)	Far Eastern University	
18 (1955–56)	Far Eastern University	
19 (1956–57)	Far Eastern University	
20 (1957–58) to 41 (1978–79)	Not played	
42 (1979–80)	University of the Philippines Diliman	
43 (1980–81)	University of the Philippines Diliman	
44 (1981–82)	University of Santo Tomas	
45 (1982–83)	University of Santo Tomas	
46 (1983–84)	University of Santo Tomas	
47 (1984–85)	Adamson University	
48 (1985–86)	Adamson University	
49 (1986–87)	Adamson University	
50 (1987–88)	Adamson University	
51 (1988–89)	Adamson University	
52 (1989–90)	University of the Philippines Diliman	
53 (1990–91)	De La Salle University	
54 (1991–92)	Adamson University	
55 (1992–93)	University of Santo Tomas	
56 (1993–94)	University of Santo Tomas	
57 (1994–95)	De La Salle University	
58 (1995–96)	De La Salle University	
59 (1996–97)	University of Santo Tomas	
60 (1997–98)	University of the Philippines Diliman	
61 (1998–99)	University of the Philippines Diliman	
62 (1999-00)	University of the Philippines Diliman	
63 (2000–01)	Ateneo de Manila University	
64 (2001–02)	Ateneo de Manila University	
65 (2002–03)	University of Santo Tomas	De La Salle University
66 (2003–04)	De La Salle University	De La Salle University
67 (2004–05)	University of Santo Tomas	De La Salle University
68 (2005–06)	De La Salle University	De La Salle University
69 (2006–07)	University of Santo Tomas	University of Santo Tomas
70 (2007–08)	University of Santo Tomas	University of Santo Tomas
71 (2008–09)	De La Salle University	University of Santo Tomas
72 (2009–10)	University of Santo Tomas	De La Salle University
73 (2010–11)	University of Santo Tomas	De La Salle University
74 (2011–12)	De La Salle University	University of Santo Tomas
75 (2012–13)	National University	De La Salle University
76 (2013–14)	National University	National University
77 (2014–15))	National University	National University
78 (2015–16)	National University	National University
79 (2016–17)	University of the East	National University
80 (2017–18)	National University	University of Santo Tomas
81 (2018–19)	National University	National University
82 (2019–20)	Cancelled due to COVID-19 pandemic	
83 (2020–21)	Cancelled due to COVID-19 pandemic	
84 (2021–22)	Not held due to COVID-19 pandemic	
85 (2022–23)	University of Santo Tomas	National University
86 (2023–24)	University of Santo Tomas	National University
87 (2024–25)	National University	University of Santo Tomas
88 (2025–26)	University of Santo Tomas	National University

=== Streaks ===
- Far Eastern University owns the longest championship streak in the Men's Division with 8 consecutive titles.
- De La Salle University and National University have the longest championship streak in the Women's Division with 4 consecutive titles each.

=== Double crown ===
- De La Salle University won "double crowns" in Seasons 2003–04 and 2005–06.
- University of Santo Tomas won a "back-to-back double crown" in Seasons 2006–07 & 2007–08.
- National University won three consecutive double crown in Seasons 2013-14, 2014-2015, and 2015-2016. Also earned their fourth double crown in Season 2018-19.

== Number of championships by school ==
University	Men's	Women's	Total
University of Santo Tomas	17	6	20
De La Salle University	7	7	14
National University	7	7	14
Far Eastern University	8	0	8
Adamson University	6	0	6
University of the Philippines Diliman	6	0	6
Ateneo de Manila University	2	0	2
University of the East	1	0	1
