= 1998 UST Growling Tigers basketball team =

1998 UST Growling Tigers men's basketball

Record
- Elims rank: #T–4
- Final rank: #4
- 1998 record: 9–8 (7–7 elims)
- Head coach: Aric del Rosario (12th season)
- Assistant coaches: Dong Vergeire; Boy Ong
- Captain: Dale Singson (5th season)

The 1998 UST Growling Tigers men's basketball team represented University of Santo Tomas in the 61st season of the University Athletic Association of the Philippines. The men's basketball tournament for the school year 1998–99 began on July 11, 1998, and the host school for the season was the University of the East.

The Tigers ended the double round-robin eliminations with seven wins and seven losses. The UE Red Warriors and the UP Fighting Maroons had the same win–loss record, but UE was ranked higher due to a superior quotient. This left UST to contend with UP in a playoff game for the remaining fourth Final Four slot. The two teams split their elimination round games, with the Tigers winning the first round in overtime, and the Maroons getting payback in the next round with an 80–78 win. UST won the playoff with an eight-point lead at 80–72 and had once again faced the De La Salle Green Archers for the second straight year in the semifinal round. They earlier defeated the Green Archers in the second round of eliminations to give them their only loss of the season.

In the Final Four, the Tigers took away La Salle's twice-to-beat advantage with a 55–51 win to extend the series to a deciding Game 2. The concluding match saw eleven lead changes until La Salle's Renren Ritualo drove and converted from the baseline to bring UST down by three points. The Tigers were unable to score as they committed a series of turnovers. They eventually lost at 51–56, sending La Salle to the Finals.

Veteran forward Richard Yee, who had averaged 13.1 points per game was selected to the Mythical second team during the presentation of individual awards.

== Roster ==
UST Growling Tigers roster
Players
Coaches

Pos.	No.	Nat.	Name	Height	Year	High School
SF	4	(Philippines)	Emmerson Oreta	6'3" (1.91m)	2nd	University of Santo Tomas
PG	5	(Philippines)	Jake Westley Agleron	5'9" (1.75m)	1st	San Sebastian College-Recoletos
SF	6	(Philippines)	Niño Greggy Gelig	6'2" (1.88m)	1st	Holy Angel University
C	7	(Philippines)	Marvin Ortiguerra	6'5" (1.96m)	2nd	Mapúa Institute of Technology
SF	8	(Philippines)	Ramon Talaga, III	6'0" (1.83m)	4th	–
C	9	(Philippines)	Gilbert Lao	6'7" (2.01m)	2nd	Uno High School
PG	10	(Philippines)	Ramon Singson (C)	5'11" (1.8m)	5th	Mandaue Academy
SF	11	(Philippines)	Gerard Raymond Francisco	6'3" (1.91m)	4th	University of Santo Tomas
PF	14	(Philippines)	Richard Yee	6'4" (1.93m)	5th	Antique National School
C	15	(Philippines)	Mark Joseph Kong	6'8" (2.03m)	1st	University of Santo Tomas
SG	16	(Philippines)	Arnulfo Roan Tuadles, Jr.	6'1" (1.85m)	1st	Saint Francis of Assisi College
PF	17	(Philippines)	Melchor Latoreno	6'5" (1.96m)	3rd	University of Santo Tomas
SG	18	(Philippines)	Cyrus Baguio	6'2" (1.88m)	1st	Southwestern University
PG	20	(Philippines)	Angelo Velasco (injured)	5'9" (1.75m)	4th	St. Francis High School

Head coach

- (Philippines) Januario del Rosario

Assistant coach(es)

- Edward Vergeire
- Eusebio Ong

Legend

- (C) Team captain
- Injured

=== Depth chart ===
Pos.	Starting 5	Bench 1	Bench 2
C	Ortiguerra	Lao
PF	Yee	Latoreno
SF	Francisco	Gelig
SG	Oreta	Tuadles	Baguio
PG	Singson	Agleron

== Roster changes ==
The Tigers lost four of their players from the 1994–96 champion squads to departures, as Henry Ong and Romel David had already graduated. Richard Melencio and Chandler Donaldson, meanwhile were signed to teams in the newly-formed Metropolitan Basketball Association to play professionally.

=== Subtractions ===
Pos.	No.	Nat.	Player	Height	Year	High school	Notes
SF	5	(Philippines)	John Dale Valena	6' 0"	3rd	University of Santo Tomas	Transferred to José Rizal College
SG	9	(Philippines)	Romel David	5' 10"	5th	Mapúa Institute of Technology	Graduated
SG	11	(Philippines)	Richard Melencio	5' 9"	5th	San Beda College	Forwent final year to play in the MBA
PF	13	(Philippines)	Ryan Bernardo	6' 5"	2nd		Left the team to play in the MBA
C	19	(United States)	Chandler Tyrone Donaldson	6' 5"	4th		Left the team to play in the MBA
SG	18	(Philippines)	Henry Ong	5' 11"	5th	Mapúa Institute of Technology	Graduated

=== Additions ===
Pos.	No.	Nat.	Player	Height	Year	High school	Notes
PG	5	(Philippines)	Jake Westley Agleron	5' 9"	1st	San Sebastian College-Recoletos	Rookie
SF	6	(Philippines)	Niño Greggy Gelig	6' 2"	1st	Holy Angel University	Rookie
C	15	(Philippines)	Mark Joseph Kong	6' 8"	1st	University of Santo Tomas	Rookie
SG	16	(Philippines)	Arnulfo Roan Tuadles Jr.	6' 1"	1st	Saint Francis of Assisi College	Rookie
SG	18	(Philippines)	Cyrus Baguio	6' 2"	1st	Southwestern University	Rookie

== Schedule and results ==
Elimination games were played in a double round-robin format. All games were aired on PTV 4 and SBN 21 by Silverstar Sports.

UAAP Season 61 game log

Elimination round: 7–7
Game	Date • Time	Opponent	Result	Record	High points	High rebounds	High assists	Location
1	Jul 11 • 2:30 pm	FEU Tamaraws	L 58–63	0–1				Araneta Coliseum; Quezon City
2	Jul 19 • 3:30 pm	Ateneo Blue Eagles	W 80–66	1–1				Ninoy Aquino Stadium; Manila
3	Jul 26 • 3:30 pm	De La Salle Green Archers	L 62–76	1–2				Ninoy Aquino Stadium; Manila
4	Aug 1 • 5:30 pm	NU Bulldogs	W 96–73	2–2				Araneta Coliseum; Quezon City
5	Aug 6 • 3:30 pm	UE Red Warriors	L 58–72	2–3				Loyola Center; Quezon City
6	Aug 9 • 1:00 pm	Adamson Soaring Falcons	W 77–63	3–3				Loyola Center; Quezon City
7	Aug 15 • 3:30 pm	UP Fighting Maroons; End of R1 of eliminations	W 65–64^{OT}	4–3				Loyola Center; Quezon City
8	Aug 19 • 3:30 pm	Ateneo Blue Eagles	L 62–72	4–4				Ninoy Aquino Stadium; Manila
9	Aug 22 • 3:30 pm	De La Salle Green Archers	W 66–63	5–4				Ninoy Aquino Stadium; Manila
10	Aug 29 • 1:00 pm	Adamson Soaring Falcons	W 67–63	6–4				Loyola Center; Quezon City
11	Sep 5 • 3:30 pm	UP Fighting Maroons	L 78–80	6–5				Ninoy Aquino Stadium; Manila
12	Sep 12 • 2:30 pm	UE Red Warriors	W 78–72	7–5				Araneta Coliseum; Quezon City
13	Sep 19 • 3:30 pm	FEU Tamaraws	L 58–65	7–6				Ninoy Aquino Stadium; Manila
14	Sep 26 • 1:00 pm	NU Bulldogs; End of R2 of eliminations	L 74–78	7–7				Ninoy Aquino Stadium; Manila

Playoff for fourth seed: 1–0
Game	Date • Time	Seed	Opponent	Result	Series	High points	High rebounds	High assists	Location
1	Sep 28 • 3:30 pm		UP Fighting Maroons	W 80–72	1–0 (8–7)				Ninoy Aquino Stadium; Manila

Final Four: 1–1
Game	Date • Time	Seed	Opponent	Result	Series	High points	High rebounds	High assists	Location
1	Oct 1 • 1:00 pm	(#4)	(#1) De La Salle Green Archers	W 55–51	1–0 (9–7)				Araneta Coliseum; Quezon City
2	Oct 3 • 3:30 pm	(#4)	(#1) De La Salle Green Archers	L 51–56	1–1 (9–8)				Araneta Coliseum; Quezon City

(#) Tournament seedings in parentheses.
All times are in UTC+08:00.
Source: UBelt.com (archived)

== Awards ==
Name	Award	Date	Ref.
Team	National Students—NCR champions	Jan 1999	
Richard Yee	UAAP Mythical second team	7 Oct 1998	

== Players drafted into the PBA ==
Richard Yee was picked fifth in the first round of the 1999 PBA draft by the Derrick Pumaren-led Purefoods Tender Juicy Hotdogs team on January 16, 1999. Gerard Francisco was also selected in the same rookie draft as the tenth overall pick by the Adonis Tierra-coached Sta. Lucia Realtors.

Dale Singson joined the Iloilo Megavoltz in the MBA from 1999 until the middle of the 2000 season after a buyout deal by the Shell Velocity team which sent him to the PBA during the 2000 All-Filipino Cup eliminations.

Year	Round	Pick	Overall	Player	PBA team
1999	1	5	5	Richard Yee	Purefoods Tender Juicy Hotdogs
1999	2	1	10	Gerard Francisco	Sta. Lucia Realtors
2000	Signed as a free agent			Dale Singson	Shell Velocity
