= 1996 UST Growling Tigers basketball team =

1996 UST Growling Tigers men's basketball

UAAP Season 59 champions

Record
- Elims rank: #2
- Final rank: #1
- 1996 record: 13–4 (10–4 elims)
- Head coach: Aric del Rosario (10th season)
- Assistant coaches: Dong Vergeire; Binky Favis
- Captain: Chris Cantonjos (4th season)

The 1996 UST Growling Tigers men's basketball team represented University of Santo Tomas in the 59th season of the University Athletic Association of the Philippines. The men's basketball tournament for the school year 1996–97 began on July 13, 1996, and the host school for the season was De La Salle University.

They defeated the De La Salle Green Archers for the third straight year in a Finals series to achieve a four-peat for the second time in 46 years after winning them from 1946 to 1949. The 1996 title brought their total championships to 17, making them the second winningest team in the league. Third-year forward Estong Ballesteros was selected to the Mythical team at the tournament's presentation of awards.

== Roster ==
UST Growling Tigers roster
Players
Coaches

Pos.	No.	Nat.	Name	Height	Year	High School
PG	4	(Philippines)	Francis Mangyao	6'0" (1.83m)	3rd	University of Southern Philippines Foundation
SF	5	(Philippines)	John Dale Valena	6'0" (1.83m)	1st	University of Santo Tomas
SF	8	(Philippines)	Ramon Talaga, III	6'0" (1.83m)	2nd	–
SG	9	(Philippines)	Romel David	5'10" (1.78m)	4th	Mapúa Institute of Technology
PG	10	(Philippines)	Ramon Singson	5'11" (1.8m)	3rd	Mandaue Academy
SG	11	(Philippines)	Richard Melencio	5'9" (1.75m)	3rd	San Beda College
SF	12	(Philippines)	Gerard Raymond Francisco	6'3" (1.91m)	2nd	University of Santo Tomas
PF	14	(Philippines)	Richard Yee	6'4" (1.93m)	3rd	Antique National School
C	15	(Philippines)	Christopher Cantonjos (C)	6'6" (1.98m)	4th	Colegio de San Juan de Letran
PF	16	(Philippines)	Ernesto Ballesteros	6'4" (1.93m)	3rd	Mapúa Institute of Technology
C	17	(Philippines)	Melchor Latoreno	6'5" (1.96m)	1st	University of Santo Tomas
SG	18	(Philippines)	Henry Ong	5'11" (1.8m)	4th	Mapúa Institute of Technology
C	19	(United States)	Chandler Tyrone Donaldson (injured)	6'5" (1.96m)	3rd	–
SG	20	(Philippines)	Angelo Velasco	5'9" (1.75m)	2nd	St. Francis High School

Head coach

- (Philippines) Januario del Rosario

Assistant coach(es)

- Edward Vergeire
- Vincent Kenneth Favis

Legend

- (C) Team captain
- Injured

=== Depth chart ===
Pos.	Starting 5	Bench 1	Bench 2
C	Cantonjos	Latoreno
PF	Yee	Ballesteros
SF	Francisco	Melencio	Valena
SG	Ong	David	Talaga
PG	Singson	Velasco	Mangyao

== Roster changes ==
=== Subtractions ===
Pos.	No.	Nat.	Player	Height	Year	High school	Notes
SG	5	(Philippines)	Lester Andrew del Rosario	5' 11"	4th	University of Santo Tomas	Graduated
SF	7	(Philippines)	Francisco Guinto	6' 3"	4th		Academic deficiencies

=== Additions ===
Pos.	No.	Nat.	Player	Height	Year	High school	Notes
SF	5	(Philippines)	John Dale Valena	6' 0"	1st	University of Santo Tomas	Rookie
C	17	(Philippines)	Melchor Latoreno	6' 5"	1st	University of Santo Tomas	Rookie

== Schedule and results ==
=== Preseason tournaments ===
Preseason game log

1996 National Seniors Open Basketball Championship: 7–1
Game	Date • Time	Opponent	Result	Record	High points	High rebounds	High assists	Location
1	Mar 27 • 8:00 am	AMACC Cybertigers	W 66–52	1–0	Cantonjos (15)			Rizal Memorial Coliseum Manila
2 (Note: Won by forfeit)	Mar 28 • 8:00 am	Nueva Ecija	W	2–0				Rizal Memorial Coliseum Manila
3	Mar 31 • 10:30 am	PHA-Ironcon	W	3–0				Rizal Memorial Coliseum Manila
4	Apr 1 • 1:00 pm	A-1 Driving School	W 94–81	4–0	Cantonjos (15)			Rizal Memorial Coliseum Manila
5	Apr 2 • 1:00 pm	PCCr Enforcers	W 91–64	5–0	Ong (14)			Rizal Memorial Coliseum Manila
6	Apr 10 • 3:00 pm	Perpetual Altas	W	6–0				San Andres Gymnasium Manila
7	Apr	MLQU Stallions	L 81–95	6–1				Rizal Memorial Coliseum Manila
8	Apr 30	MLQU Stallions; Championship game	W 92–76	7–1	Ballesteros (20)			Rizal Memorial Coliseum Manila

1996 Fr. Martin Cup: 7–0
Game	Date • Time	Opponent	Result	Record	High points	High rebounds	High assists	Location
1	May 10	JRC Heavy Bombers	W	1–0				Loyola Center; Quezon City
2	May 12	PCCr Enforcers	W 93–56	2–0	Ballesteros (21)			Loyola Center; Quezon City
3	May 14	San Beda Red Lions	W 69–67	3–0	Cantonjos (23)			Loyola Center; Quezon City
4	May 17	Adamson Soaring Falcons	W 97–73	4–0	Ballesteros (17)			Loyola Center; Quezon City
5	May 21	UE Red Warriors	W 80–72	5–0	Yee (18)			Loyola Center; Quezon City
6	Jun 1	Letran Knights; Semifinal game	W 77–68	6–0	Cantonjos (23)			Loyola Center; Quezon City
7	Jun 3	UE Red Warriors; Championship game	W 98–95	7–0	Yee (20)			Loyola Center; Quezon City

(#) Tournament seedings in parentheses.
All times are in UTC+08:00.

=== UAAP games ===
Elimination games were played in a double round-robin format. All games were aired on PTV 4 by Silverstar Sports.

UAAP Season 59 game log

Elimination round: 10–4
Game	Date • Time	Opponent	Result	Record	High points	High rebounds	High assists	Location
1	Jul 13 • 1:00 pm	UE Red Warriors	W 58–52	1–0	Cantonjos (15)			Araneta Coliseum; Quezon City
2	Jul 20 • 3:00 pm	Ateneo Blue Eagles	L 62–66	1–1				Ninoy Aquino Stadium Manila
3	Jul 24 • 5:30 pm	NU Bulldogs	W 78–59	2–1	Melencio (16)	Francisco (6)	Tied (2)	Ninoy Aquino Stadium Manila
4	Jul 28 • 3:30 pm	UP Fighting Maroons	W 97–71	3–1	Cantonjos (24)	Cantonjos (13)	Francisco (8)	Rizal Memorial Coliseum Manila
5	Aug 4 • 3:30 pm	Adamson Soaring Falcons	W 80–65	4–1	Ballesteros (30)			Rizal Memorial Coliseum Manila
6	Aug 11 • 3:30 pm	FEU Tamaraws	L 64–67	4–2	Singson (16)			Rizal Memorial Coliseum Manila
7	Aug 17 • 3:00 pm	De La Salle Green Archers; End of R1 of eliminations	L 60–63^{OT}	4–3	Ballesteros (20)			Ninoy Aquino Stadium Manila
8	Aug 24 • 1:00 pm	Adamson Soaring Falcons	W 76–72	5–3	Francisco (19)			Ninoy Aquino Stadium Manila
9	Aug 28 • 2:00 pm	NU Bulldogs	W 74–64	6–3	Tied (19)			Ninoy Aquino Stadium Manila
10	Aug 31 • 3:00 pm	FEU Tamaraws	W 79–74	7–3	Cantonjos (18)			Ninoy Aquino Stadium Manila
11	Sep 12 • 5:00 pm	UE Red Warriors	W 76–66	8–3	Tied (17)			Loyola Center; Quezon City
12	Sep 15 • 4:00 pm	UP Fighting Maroons	W 72–71	9–3	Ballesteros (16)	Ballesteros (12)		Rizal Memorial Coliseum Manila
13	Sep 17 • 3:30 pm	De La Salle Green Archers	L 61–72	9–4	Singson (16)			Rizal Memorial Coliseum Manila
14	Sep 22 • 4:00 pm	Ateneo Blue Eagles; End of R2 of eliminations	W 84–79	10–4	Cantonjos (19)			Rizal Memorial Coliseum Manila

Final Four: 1–0
Game	Date • Time	Seed	Opponent	Result	Series	High points	High rebounds	High assists	Location
1	Sep 28 • 3:00 pm	(#2)	(#3) UP Fighting Maroons	W 63–56	1–0 (11–4)	Tied (14)			Araneta Coliseum; Quezon City

Finals: 2–0
Game	Date • Time	Seed	Opponent	Result	Series	High points	High rebounds	High assists	Location
1	Oct 5 • 3:00 pm	(#2)	(#1) De La Salle Green Archers	W 65–60	1–0 (12–4)	Ong (17)	Yee (6)	Yee (2)	Araneta Coliseum; Quezon City
2	Oct 8 • 6:00 pm	(#2)	(#1) De La Salle Green Archers	W 57–54	2–0 (13–4)	Cantonjos (14)	Ong (6)	Ong (3)	Araneta Coliseum; Quezon City

(#) Tournament seedings in parentheses.
All times are in UTC+08:00.
Source: Google News Archives

=== Summary ===
The UST community had adopted the slogan “Fourward” in support of the team's quest for a record-tying four-peat immediately after the Tigers won their third straight championship the past season. Their drive was reinforced in the preseason when they won the National Seniors and the Father Martin Cup championships. Veteran coach Aric del Rosario had built this year's team around reigning MVP Chris Cantonjos, who was the last remaining player from the undefeated 1993 Growling Tigers team. He, along with Estong Ballesteros, Richard Yee, Dale Singson, Henry Ong, and Chandler Donaldson honed their skills in the off-season while playing in the Philippine Basketball League.

==== First round ====
	1	2	Total
UST	27	31	58
UE	21	31	52

UE Red Warriors

The Tigers lost their 43–35 eight-point lead in the second half when the Warriors began a 7–0 run. They were able to pull away after a string of turnovers by UE and basket conversions by Ballesteros off assists from Singson and Gelo Velasco yielded eight unanswered points to increase their lead at 51–42 with 5:25 remaining in the game.

The first half saw the Tigers erect a 22–11 lead, but the Warriors rallied back to bring down the deficit to six at the end of the half. Reigning MVP Chris Cantonjos led UST with 15 points and 4 rebounds.

Ateneo Blue Eagles

Ateneo pulled away with a 66–62 win after the Tigers’ big men fouled out late in the game. UST was leading, 55–54 when Cantonjos committed his fifth and final foul with 3:37 left. The score has been close until the last 2:10 when the Eagles made their move behind John Verayo's efforts, first, by converting both free throws off a Richard Melencio foul for a 61–58 lead; and then a steal off Singson that led to a fast break and a layup by teammate Gabby Cui. Melencio was able to score from under the basket to move within three at 60–63, but Ballesteros got called for his fifth foul in the last 0:43 during a rebounding tussle with Verayo.

	1	2	Total
NU	29	30	59
UST	38	40	78

NU Bulldogs

The Tigers defeated the NU Bulldogs, 78–59 even as they missed the services of Yee, Donaldson, and Francis Mangyao who had suffered from various injuries. The team relied on the collective rebounding of Cantonjos, Melencio, and Gerard Francisco to deny the Bulldogs from scoring second-chance points. They broke away from their nine-point 38–29 halftime lead when the quartet of Singson, Melencio, Cantonjos, and Ong orchestrated a 16–4 run to put the game out of their opponents’ reach. Melencio led in scoring with a game-high of 16 points.

UP Fighting Maroons

Hardly missing the still-injured Yee, Mangyao and Donaldson, the Tigers won against UP by a blowout lead of 26 points. The score was tied at 43–all at the 8:44 mark of the second half before Singson and Velasco each shot a three-pointer to ignite a 20–9 run for a 63–50 lead. Cantonjos finished with 24 points to go with his 13 rebounds.

	1	2	Total
UST	40	40	80
Adamson	36	29	65

Adamson Soaring Falcons

UST won their third straight game when they defeated Adamson, 80–65 behind Ballesteros’ game-high of 30 points. The Tigers led, 40–36 at the half, until Ballesteros sparked a 14–7 rally at the 12:40 mark to pull his team to 54–43.

FEU Tamaraws

With Cantonjos sitting out due to a stress fracture on his right hand, the Tigers lost against FEU, 64–67. Singson topscored for UST with 16 points.

	1	2	OT	Total
UST	22	30	8	60
La Salle	24	28	11	63

De La Salle Green Archers

The Tigers suffered their second straight loss at the hands of La Salle by three points in a game that went into overtime. Ballesteros topscored for UST with 21 points.

==== Second round ====
UST's four wins and three losses in the first round put them in a tie at third place with Ateneo and behind La Salle and the UP Fighting Maroons’ 5–2 record.

“I let them know my displeasure whenever I don’t see them put their effort in the game. I was even telling them that other teams work so hard to try to be where we are at, and yet, here you are, refusing to give your best.”

— Aric del Rosario

	1	2	Total
UST	32	44	76
Adamson	33	39	72

Adamson Soaring Falcons

Injuries continued to hound the Tigers as Cantonjos and Donaldson sat out, forcing the still-recuperating Richard Yee to suit up to relieve forwards Ballesteros and rookie Mel Latoreno. The Falcons staged a late rally in the last two minutes in an effort to surmount UST's 10-point advantage, but the Tigers were able to keep them at bay until time ran out. Francisco and Ballesteros scored 19 and 18 points respectively.

NU Bulldogs

Dale Singson's endgame heroics prevented the NU Bulldogs from staging a late-game comeback. The starting point guard converted three free throws and made back-to-back steals in the last 18 seconds to give the Tigers an 11–4 scoring advantage for a 74–64 win. The team continued to miss the services of their two centers, with Donaldson being ruled out for the remainder of the season due to a slipped disc, and Cantonjos still suffering from dizziness.

	1	2	Total
FEU	34	40	74
UST	39	40	79

FEU Tamaraws

The Tigers avenged their first-round loss to FEU with a 79–74 win, but they were still reeling from the absences of their big men. Camtonjos, who had been suffering from dizziness had to be literally plucked out from the UST Hospital to play in place of Mel Latoreno, who was part of the Philippines' U-18 team that left for the ABC tournament in Malaysia. The Tigers regrouped from a turnover-filled first half to mount a 17–9 run by Cantonjos, Ballesteros, and Yee for a 58–45 lead.

“Maganda ang takbo namin ngayon. Kung ganyan ang takbo namin sa linggo, baka pasok kami sa Finals.”
(Our plays went well today. If we play like this on Sunday, we might make it to the Finals.)

— Aric del Rosario

UE Red Warriors

Coach Aric del Rosario heaved a sigh of relief as the Tigers benefitted from the return to form of his two starters. Richard Yee has recovered from his bout with hepatitis, while Dale Singson's sprained left thigh has finally healed. The veteran coach was pleased with how the team was able to run and execute their plays.

Henry Ong scored 14 of his 17 points the first half with three three-point shot conversions that helped his team erect a commanding 27-point lead over UE.

UP Fighting Maroons

Dale Singson towed the Tigers to a down-to-the-wire victory for the second time in the second round since his endgame performance against the NU Bulldogs on August 28. Trailing UP at 66–71 in the last 33 seconds of the game, UST was able to pull close with free throw conversions by Yee, Cantonjos, and Ballesteros to put the game within one at 70–71. Singson was able to steal off UP's Jasper Javier and convert on a drive for the win as time expired.

	1	2	Total
UST	35	26	61
La Salle	37	35	72

De La Salle Green Archers

UST could not get their perimeter shooting going as La Salle repeated their win over the Tigers in the second round. The Archers took the solo spot at first place from being tied with UST prior to the game with identical 9–3 records. The score was tied at 54–all at the 8:57 mark in the second half when La Salle's Chris Tan made two successive baskets. The Tigers were unable to score as the Archers pulled ahead, 65–54.

Ateneo Blue Eagles

The Tigers broke free from a 75–all deadlock with a 9–4 run that started with Dale Singson's jump shot and followed by a layup by Henry Ong. Ateneo cane close to within three at 79–76 in the last 56 seconds, but UST was able to force back-to-back turnovers, the first resulting to a three-point play by Cantonjos, and then a two-point conversion to end the game at 84–79.

==== Final Four ====
	1	2	Total
UP	29	27	56
UST	41	22	63

UP Fighting Maroons

Holding a twice-to-beat advantage over the third-seeded UP Fighting Maroons, the Tigers came out with a 63–56 win to advance to the Finals. Coming from a 12-point halftime lead, UST relied on steady free throw shooting from Gerard Francisco to pull away after UP's Paolo Mendoza fired a three-point shot to cut down the lead to five at 59–54 in the last 40 seconds.

==== Finals ====
“I was telling them about history, that if we win, we're already part of history. That even when we're long gone, people will still read what we accomplished. Our record will always be there.”

— Aric del Rosario

Even as UST is seeded second behind La Salle, and have lost both their head-to-head elimination games, analysts have tabbed them as the favorites to win the championship. The Archers’ Jong Uichico, who was coaching a collegiate team in the Finals for the first time in his career, will be relying on a group of young players who equally have no prior championship experience. Del Rosario begged to differ, citing injuries on his players during the eliminations have lowered their chances in the Finals. He motivated his players by emphasizing the opportunity to make history in the UAAP with winning a fourth consecutive title.

	1	2	Total
UST	26	39	65
La Salle	31	29	60

Game 1

The Tigers’ defense prevented La Salle from scoring at will in the last 10 minutes. In contrast, UST had a great game with their shooting, with nine of Henry Ong's 17 points coming from three-point shots. Down by five points at 44–49, they were able to execute a 12–0 run at the 5:36 mark to give their team a 56–49 lead.

Game 2

UST went scoreless for eight minutes in the first half, which ended with La Salle leading, 26–21. They began the second half with a 5–0 run behind Dale Singson's three-point shot and an eight-foot Pull-up jumper on a transition fast break to tie the score. The two teams traded baskets until the Archers pulled away after Tyrone Bautista made a three-point shot to put his team ahead by nine points with six minutes left. The Tigers next scored nine unanswered points which was capped by Henry Ong's three-point shot in the last 2:23 to tie the game at 48-all.

	1	2	Total
La Salle	26	28	54
UST	21	36	57

Estong Ballesteros fouled out in the ensuing play with Bautista making both free throws. Gelo Velasco made back-to-back baskets, first a mid-range shot, and then a three-point shot off a Mark Telan miss, pulling his team ahead by one. A foul by Ong sent Bautista to the line anew, making both free throws again for a La Salle lead. Ong, in turn drove and converted with a foul from Bautista for a three-point play in the last 33 seconds. He made the bonus shot for a three-point lead. Telan missed a three-point attempt but was fouled by Cantonjos in the rebound, giving possession to La Salle. Chris Tan converted on a drive and Dino Aldeguer hurriedly fouled Ong at the inboud to stop the game clock. He split his free throws, giving the Archers a chance to tie after Don Allado collared the rebound, but Dale Singson was able to steal the ball from Bautista who was driving down the basket with 11.7 seconds left. Telan fouled him in the 9.2 mark. Singson missed both free throws as Telan got the rebound, but La Salle missed two successive three point shots by Bautista and Tan as time ran out. UST won, 57–54.

== Awards ==
Name	Award	Date	Ref.
Team	National Seniors Open champions	30 Apr 1996	
Team	Fr. Martin Cup champions	3 Jun 1996	
Team	UAAP champions	8 Oct 1996	
Estong Ballesteros	Mythical team	8 Oct 1996	

== Players drafted into the PBA ==
Estong Ballesteros was picked fourth overall in the 1997 PBA draft by the Chito Narvasa-led Formula Shell Zoom Masters team on January 19, 1997. Chris Cantonjos, meanwhile, was one of the six players elevated by the Tanduay Centennial Rhum team to the PBA from the Philippine Basketball League in 1999.

Year	Round	Pick	Overall	Player	PBA team
1997	1	4	4	Estong Ballesteros	Formula Shell Zoom Masters
1999	Elevated from the PBL			Chris Cantonjos	Tanduay Rhum Masters
