= Aric del Rosario =

Filipino basketball player and coach (1940–2020)

Commissioner of the National Collegiate Athletic Association Basketball
- In office 2009–2011
- Basketball career

Personal information
- Born: January 1, 1940
- Died: March 25, 2020 (aged 80) Manila, Philippines

Career information
- College: UST
- Coaching career: 1985–2003; 2012–2015; 2018–2018

Career history

Coaching
- 1985–1987: UST
- 1989–1997: Alaska Milkmen (assistant)
- 1990–2003: UST
- 1998: Pampanga Dragons
- 2000–2003: Mobiline/Talk 'N Text Phone Pals (assistant)
- 2003: Philippines
- 2012–2015: Perpetual
- 2018: Parañaque Patriots

Career highlights
- As head coach: MBA champion (1998); 4x UAAP champion (1993, 1994, 1995, 1996); As assistant coach: 8× PBA champion (1991 Third Conference, 1994 Governors', 1995 Governors', 1996 All-Filipino, 1996 Commissioner's, 1996 Governors', 1997 Governors' 2003 All-Filipino); Grand Slam champion (1996); As player: UAAP champion (1964)
Medals
Men's basketball
Head coach for Philippines
SEA Games
Gold medal – first place	2003 Ho Chi Minh	Team
Assistant coach for Philippines
Asian Games
Bronze medal – third place	1998 Bangkok	Team
William Jones Cup
Gold medal – first place	1998 Taipei	Team

Januario "Aric" del Rosario (January 1, 1940 – March 25, 2020) was a Filipino basketball player and coach who served as head coach of the UST Growling Tigers in the UAAP, Pampanga Dragons in the Metropolitan Basketball Association, the 2003 RP Men's Team in the Southeast Asian Games, and of the UPHSD Altas from 2012 to 2015; until he retired and was made a consultant of the team in the NCAA. He was also a consultant and assistant Coach of Toyota-Balintawak Road Kings in the Philippine Basketball League. He was the commissioner of the NCAA (Philippines) from 2009 to 2011.

As a UST player, del Rosario was part of the 1964 Glowing goldies team that won the UAAP Basketball Championship that year together with Hector Hipolito, the coach of the Adamson team that battled UST in its last game of the eliminations of the 1993 season en route to the rare sweep, 14–0, that made UST the automatic champions that year.

== Playing career ==
Del Rosario played for the collegiate basketball team of the University of Santo Tomas which participates in the UAAP Basketball Championship. Then-known as the Glowing Goldies, del Rosario was part of the squad which clinched the UAAP Season 27 men's basketball title.

== Coaching career ==
=== University of Santo Tomas ===
The University of Santo Tomas (UST) Growling Tigers appointed del Rosario as their head coach in 1991. Under his tutelage, the UST Growling Tigers achieve success in the 1990s winning 4 straight championships from 1993 up to 1996. (UAAP Seasons 56 to 59) The first championship was won via a 14–0 sweep the year before the Final Four format was introduced in the University Athletic Association of the Philippines (UAAP). In the next three championships, they will beat the De La Salle Green Archers to make a dynasty in the UAAP. In 1997, their dreams of a 5-peat were spoiled as they lose to the De La Salle Green Archers (their finals opponent from 1994 to 1996) in the final 4 despite UST holding the twice to beat advantage against La Salle. It also signaled the end of the 4-year dominance of UST. In 1999, UST made it again to the finals with an 11–3 win-loss card only to lose again this time to a familiar foe, the De La Salle Green Archers courtesy of the game-tying three-point shot by Dino Aldeguer to send the game into overtime.

In 2001, UST wasn't able to play in the final 4 for the first time in school's history (the format was implemented in 1994) but came back in 2002 together with Cyrus Baguio. The following year, UST didn't reach the final 4 for the second time and it signaled the end of his long coaching reign and later he was replaced by Nel Parado.

=== Alaska Milkmen ===
Del Rosario served as an assistant coach to Alaska Milkmen head coach Tim Cone helping the team's first ever PBA title when it won the Third Conference in 1991 and achieve a grand slam in the 1996 season by winning all three conference titles for that season.

=== Pampanga Dragons ===
Del Rosario was tasked to coach the Pampanga Dragons of the Metropolitan Basketball Association in 1998. He led the Dragons to their first and only MBA title during the league's inaugural season in the same year.

=== Philippine national team ===
He worked as an assistant coach under Tim Cone's Philippine Centennial Team that won bronze in 1998 Asian Games.

He coached the Philippines men's national team which took part at the 2003 Southeast Asian Games helping the team clinch a gold medal in that edition of the regional championships.

=== Perpetual Altas ===
Del Rosario returned to college basketball, this time coaching the Perpetual Altas in the National Collegiate Athletic Association (Philippines). Del Rosario started in 2012, off the Altas missing the previous season's playoffs with a 5–13 record. The team made it to the playoffs in the next three years. On his fourth year, the Altas missed the playoffs despite a 11–7 record.

=== Parañaque Patriots ===
The Parañaque Patriots of the Maharlika Pilipinas Basketball League was coached by del Rosario in 2018.

== Coaching record ==
=== Collegiate record ===
Season	Team	Elimination round					Playoffs				
Season	Team	GP	W	L	PCT	Finish	PG	W	L	PCT	Results
1985	UST	12	9	3	.750	1st	2	0	2	.000	Finals
1987	UST	14	3	11	.214	7th	–	–	–	–	Eliminated
1993	UST	14	14	0	1.000	1st	–	–	–	–	Champions
1994	UST	14	8	4	.667	3rd	5	4	1	.800	Champions
1995	UST	14	11	3	.786	1st	5	3	2	.600	Champions
1996	UST	14	10	4	.714	2nd	3	3	0	1.000	Champions
1997	UST	14	10	4	.714	2nd	2	0	2	.000	Semifinals
1998	UST	14	7	7	.500	4th	3	2	1	.667	Semifinals
1999	UST	14	11	3	.786	2nd	5	2	3	.400	Finals
2000	UST	14	8	6	.571	4th	2	1	1	.500	Semifinals
2001	UST	14	6	8	.429	6th	–	–	–	–	Eliminated
2002	UST	14	8	6	.571	4th	1	0	1	.000	Semifinals
2003	UST	14	5	9	.357	6th	–	–	–	–	Eliminated
2012	UPHSD	18	10	8	.556	4th	2	1	1	.500	Semifinals
2013	UPHSD	18	11	7	.611	4th	2	0	2	.000	Semifinals
2014	UPHSD	18	12	6	.667	4th	2	0	2	.000	Semifinals
2015	UPHSD	18	11	7	.611	6th	–	–	–	–	Eliminated
Totals		224	142	82	.633		34	16	18	.470	4 championships

== Personal life ==
The Del Rosario family is a basketball inclined family. Coach Aric's sons are involved in basketball. Edsel is a former player at UST while Lester is also a former player and former assistant coach to the Perpetual Altas. His grandson, Zach (Lester's son) goes with him and his dad in UPHSD basketball practices and the young Del Rosario is showing a passion for basketball.

== Death ==
Del Rosario died on March 25, 2020, due to cardiact arrest. He was 80 years old.

Sporting positions
Preceded by Carlos Badion	UST Glowing Goldies men's basketball head coach 1985–1987	Succeeded by Orlando Bauzon
Preceded by Fred Reyes	UST Growling Tigers men's basketball head coach 1993–2004	Succeeded by Nel Parado
Preceded by Joe Lipa	Philippine NCAA basketball commissioner 2009–2011	Succeeded by Joe Lipa
Preceded by Jimwell Gican	UPHSD Altas men's basketball head coach 2012–2015	Succeeded by Antonio Tamayo
