= 1995 UST Growling Tigers basketball team =

1995 UST Growling Tigers men's basketball

UAAP Season 58 champions

Record
- Elims rank: #1
- Final rank: #1
- 1995 record: 14–5 (11–3 elims)
- Head coach: Aric del Rosario (9th season)
- Assistant coaches: Dong Vergeire; Binky Favis
- Captain: Lester del Rosario (4th season)

The 1995 UST Growling Tigers men's basketball team represented University of Santo Tomas in the 58th season of the University Athletic Association of the Philippines. The men's basketball tournament for the school year 1995–96 began on July 15, 1995, and the host school for the season was the Ateneo de Manila University.

UST finished the double round-robin eliminations at first place with 11 wins against 3 losses. They fell into a two-game losing streak early in the first round, with the Ateneo Blue Eagles winning over them for the first time in the last five years, and the UE Red Warriors handing them down a 19-point 54–73 defeat. The Tigers closed out the first round with a denial of the De La Salle Green Archers' quest for an undefeated season, snapping their 6-game winning streak with a 75–59 victory. They had an average winning margin of 11.7 points and an average losing margin of 9.3 points per game.

In the Final Four, UST overcame a 65–76 loss from the No. 4-ranked FEU Tamaraws by winning 74–68 in the deciding game to qualify to the Finals, where they were once again facing La Salle in a repeat of last year's best-of-three series. The Green Archers won Game 1 by 10 points, but the Tigers once again succeeded in extending the series to a third game after a 66–62 Game 2 win. In the deciding game, Dale Singson scored the last basket with a layup in the last 9.4 seconds after driving past La Salle's Jason Webb for a 67–64 count. The Archers missed a three-point shot as time expired, giving UST their third three peat since the 1946–48 seasons.

Chris Cantonjos was named Most Valuable Player of the season, while Gerard Francisco won the Rookie of the Year award.

== Roster ==
UST Growling Tigers roster
Players
Coaches

Pos.	No.	Nat.	Name	Height	Year	High School
PG	4	(Philippines)	Francis Mangyao	6'0" (1.83m)	2nd	University of Southern Philippines Foundation
SG	5	(Philippines)	Lester Andrew del Rosario (C)	5'11" (1.8m)	4th	University of Santo Tomas
SG	6	(Philippines)	Angelo Velasco	5'9" (1.75m)	1st	St. Francis High School
SF	7	(Philippines)	Francisco Guinto	6'3" (1.91m)	3rd	–
SG	9	(Philippines)	Romel David	5'10" (1.78m)	3rd	Mapúa Institute of Technology
PG	10	(Philippines)	Ramon Singson	5'11" (1.8m)	2nd	Mandaue Academy
SG	11	(Philippines)	Richard Melencio	5'9" (1.75m)	2nd	San Beda College
SF	12	(Philippines)	Gerard Raymond Francisco	6'3" (1.91m)	1st	University of Santo Tomas
SF	13	(Philippines)	Ramon Talaga, III	–	1st	–
PF	14	(Philippines)	Richard Yee	6'4" (1.93m)	2nd	Antique National School
C	15	(Philippines)	Christopher Cantonjos	6'6" (1.98m)	3rd	Colegio de San Juan de Letran
PF	16	(Philippines)	Ernesto Ballesteros	6'4" (1.93m)	2nd	Mapúa Institute of Technology
SG	18	(Philippines)	Henry Ong	5'11" (1.8m)	3rd	Mapúa Institute of Technology
C	20	(United States)	Chandler Tyrone Donaldson	6'5" (1.96m)	2nd	–

Head coach

- (Philippines) Januario del Rosario

Assistant coach(es)

- Edward Vergeire
- Vincent Kenneth Favis

Legend

- (C) Team captain
- Injured

=== Depth chart ===
Pos.	Starting 5	Bench 1	Bench 2
C	Cantonjos	Donaldson
PF	Ballesteros	Yee	Guinto
SF	Melencio	Francisco	Del Rosario
SG	David	Ong	Talaga
PG	Singson	Mangyao	Velasco

== Roster changes ==
=== Subtractions ===
Pos.	No.	Nat.	Player	Height	Year	High school	Notes
PG	4	(Philippines)	Emmanuel Joel Villanueva	5' 9"	2nd	University of Santo Tomas	Academic deficiencies
PF	5	(Philippines)	Edmund Reyes	6' 3"	5th	Good Shepherd Academy	Graduated
PG	11	(Philippines)	Bal David Jr.	5' 9"	3rd	University of Santo Tomas	Left team to turn professional
PG	14	(Philippines)	Edfendel Lao		3rd	Adamson University	Academic deficiencies
C	16	(Philippines)	Dennis Espino	6' 6"	5th	Holy Angel University	Graduated

=== Additions ===
Pos.	No.	Nat.	Player	Height	Year	High school	Notes
PG	4	(Philippines)	Francis Mangyao	6' 0"	2nd	University of Southern Philippines Foundation	Transferred from Salazar Institute of Technology
SG	6	(Philippines)	Angelo Velasco	5' 9"	1st	St. Francis High School	Rookie
SF	12	(Philippines)	Gerard Raymond Francisco	6' 3"	1st	University of Santo Tomas	Rookie
SF	13	(Philippines)	Ramon Talaga, III		1st		Rookie
PF	16	(Philippines)	Ernesto Ballesteros	6' 4"	2nd	Mapúa Institute of Technology	Returning from Season 55

== Schedule and results ==
=== Preseason tournament ===
Preseason game log

1995 Fr. Martin Cup: 6–0
Game	Date • Time	Opponent	Result	Record	High points	High rebounds	High assists	Location
1	May 7 • 10:30 am	SFAC Doves	W 64–61	1–0	Ballesteros (20)			Rizal Memorial Coliseum Manila
2	May 9 • 10:30 am	NU Bulldogs	W 67–59	2–0	Melencio (22)			Rizal Memorial Coliseum Manila
3	May 14 • 10:30 am	JRU Heavy Bombers	W 72–58	3–0	David (17)			Rizal Memorial Coliseum Manila
4	May 16 • 12:00 pm	Benilde Blazers	W 78–64	4–0	Ballesteros (14)			Rizal Memorial Coliseum Manila
5	May 17 • 3:00 pm	UE Red Warriors	W 71–66	5–0	David (18)			Rizal Memorial Coliseum Manila
6	May 30 • 12:00 pm	Adamson Soaring Falcons	W 88–85	6–0	Yee (20)			Rizal Memorial Coliseum Manila

(#) Tournament seedings in parentheses.
All times are in UTC+08:00.

=== UAAP games ===
Elimination games were played in a double round-robin format. All games were aired on PTV 4 by Silverstar Sports.

UAAP Season 58 game log

Elimination round: 11–3
Game	Date • Time	Opponent	Result	Record	High points	High rebounds	High assists	Location
1	Jul 15 • 7:00 pm	Adamson Soaring Falcons	W 68–64	1–0				Araneta Coliseum; Quezon City
2	Jul 18 • 1:30 pm	NU Bulldogs	W 85–80	2–0				Loyola Center; Quezon City
3	Jul 23 • 1:30 pm	Ateneo Blue Eagles	L 54–57	2–1				Loyola Center; Quezon City
4	Jul 26 • 12:45 pm	UE Red Warriors	L 54–73	2–2	Tied (11)			Araneta Coliseum; Quezon City
5	Jul 30 • 3:00 pm	UP Fighting Maroons	W 69–59	3–2	Yee (18)			Loyola Center; Quezon City
6	Aug 6 • 3:00 pm	FEU Tamaraws	W 85–67	4–2				Loyola Center; Quezon City
7	Aug 12 • 3:00 pm	De La Salle Green Archers; End of R1 of eliminations	W 75–59	5–2	Cantonjos (18)			Araneta Coliseum; Quezon City
8	Aug 19 • 3:00 pm	UP Fighting Maroons	W 82–61	6–2	Yee (17)			Loyola Center; Quezon City
9	Aug 23 • 1:30 pm	NU Bulldogs	W 77–64	7–2	Yee (19)			Loyola Center; Quezon City
10	Aug 26 • 3:00 pm	UE Red Warriors	L 61–67	7–3	Francisco (13)			Loyola Center; Quezon City
11	Aug 29 • 1:30 pm	Adamson Falcons	W 98–84	8–3	Cantonjos (27)			Loyola Center; Quezon City
12	Sep 3 • 3:00 pm	FEU Tamaraws	W 86–66	9–3				Loyola Center; Quezon City
13	Sep 9 • 3:00 pm	Ateneo Blue Eagles	W 72–67	10–3				Loyola Center; Quezon City
14	Sep 16 • 3:00 pm	De La Salle Green Archers; End of R2 of eliminations	W 87–84^{2OT}	11–3				Araneta Coliseum; Quezon City

Final Four: 1–1
Game	Date • Time	Seed	Opponent	Result	Series	High points	High rebounds	High assists	Location
1	Sep 23 • 1:30 pm	(#1)	(#4) FEU Tamaraws	L 65–76	0–1 (11–4)				Araneta Coliseum; Quezon City
2	Sep 27 • 3:00 pm	(#1)	(#4) FEU Tamaraws	W 74–68	1–1 (12–4)				Loyola Center; Quezon City

Finals: 2–1
Game	Date • Time	Seed	Opponent	Result	Series	High points	High rebounds	High assists	Location
1	Sep 30 • 3:00 pm	(#1)	(#2) De La Salle Green Archers	L 78–88	0–1 (12–5)				Araneta Coliseum; Quezon City
2	Oct 4 • 3:00 pm	(#1)	(#2) De La Salle Green Archers	W 66–62	1–1 (13–5)				Araneta Coliseum; Quezon City
3	Oct 7 • 3:00 pm	(#1)	(#2) De La Salle Green Archers	W 67–64	2–1 (14–5)				Araneta Coliseum; Quezon City

(#) Tournament seedings in parentheses.
All times are in UTC+08:00.
Source: Google News Archives

=== Postseason tournament ===
Postseason game log

1996 McDonald's Cup Battle of Champions: 3–1
Game	Date • Time	Opponent	Result	Record	High points	High rebounds	High assists	Location
1	Feb 1	PSBA Jaguars	W 79–75	1–0				Rizal Memorial Coliseum Manila
2	Feb 2	PUP Mighty Maroons	W 90–86	2–0	Cantonjos (18)			Rizal Memorial Coliseum Manila
3	Feb 3	San Sebastian Stags	W 84–77	3–0	Ong (17)			Rizal Memorial Coliseum Manila
4	Feb 4	San Sebastian Stags; Championship game	L 72–78	3–1	Tied (13)			Rizal Memorial Coliseum Manila

(#) Tournament seedings in parentheses.
All times are in UTC+08:00.

== Awards ==
Name	Award	Date	Ref.
Team	Fr. Martin Cup runners-up	2 Jun 1995	
Team	McDonald's Cup runners-up	4 Feb 1996	
Team	UAAP champions	7 Oct 1995	
Chris Cantonjos	Season MVP	7 Oct 1995	
Chris Cantonjos	Mythical team	7 Oct 1995	
Gerard Francisco	Rookie of the Year	7 Oct 1995	
