= 2001 UST Growling Tigers basketball team =

2001 UST Growling Tigers men's basketball

Record
- Elims rank: #T–6
- Final rank: #T–6
- 2001 record: 6–8
- Head coach: Aric del Rosario (15th season)
- Assistant coaches: Boy Ong
- Captain: Emmerson Oreta (5th season)

The 2001 UST Growling Tigers men's basketball team represented University of Santo Tomas in the 64th season of the University Athletic Association of the Philippines. The men's basketball tournament for the school year 2001–02 began on July 14, 2001, and the host school for the season was Far Eastern University.

The Growling Tigers failed to make it to the semifinals for the first time since the Final Four format was implemented in 1994. They ended the double round-robin eliminations at sixth place with a 6–8 record.

The team suffered their worst start since the 1989 season, when they went 1–4 in their first five games. They went through a three-game losing streak after recovering from an opening day loss against the FEU Tamaraws.

They had an average winning margin of 7.5 points and an average losing margin of 6.5 points.

== Roster ==
UST Growling Tigers roster
Players
Coaches

Pos.	No.	Nat.	Name	Height	Year	High School
SG	4	(Philippines)	Michael Anthony Sumalinog	6'0" (1.83m)	1st	University of the Visayas
PG	5	(Philippines)	Jake Westley Agleron	5'9" (1.75m)	4th	San Sebastian College-Recoletos
PG	6	(Philippines)	Edsel Ronald del Rosario	5'9" (1.75m)	2nd	University of Santo Tomas
SG	7	(Philippines)	Glenn John Manching	6'1" (1.85m)	3rd	University of the Visayas
C	8	(Philippines)	Marc Anthony Nanninga	6'7" (2.01m)	1st	Colegio de San Juan de Letran
SF	9	(Philippines)	Christian Pierce Luanzon	6'4" (1.93m)	2nd	Saint Stephen's High School
SG	10	(Philippines)	Frederic Jamison Hubalde	6'1" (1.85m)	3rd	Mapúa Institute of Technology
PG	11	(Philippines)	Jino Manansala	5'8" (1.73m)	3rd	Burlington County, New Jersey
C	12	(Philippines)	Alwyn Espiritu	6'5" (1.96m)	3rd	University of Santo Tomas
SG	14	(Philippines)	Niño Greggy Gelig	6'2" (1.88m)	4th	Holy Angel University
PF	16	(Philippines)	Rene de Guzman	6'3" (1.91m)	1st	University of Santo Tomas
PG	17	(Philippines)	Donn Rez Villamin	6'3" (1.91m)	2nd	Rizal High School
SF	18	(Philippines)	Emmerson Oreta (C)	6'3" (1.91m)	5th	University of Santo Tomas
PF	20	(Philippines)	Iago Jaime Raterta	6'3" (1.91m)	2nd	–
PF	21	(Philippines)	Rovie Ryd Baguio	–	1st	University of the Visayas

Head coach

- (Philippines) Januario del Rosario

Assistant coach(es)

Eusebio Ong

Team manager

- Benito Lim
- Timmy Koh Teng Chong

Legend

- (C) Team captain
- Injured

- Roster

=== Depth chart ===
Pos.	Starting 5	Bench 1	Bench 2
C	Espiritu	Nanninga
PF	De Guzman	Raterta	Baguio
SF	Oreta	Luanzon
SG	Gelig	Hubalde	Manching
PG	Agleron	Villamin	Manansala

== Roster changes ==
The Growling Tigers lost their big men in Marvin Ortiguerra, Gilbert Lao, and Kenneth Co Yu Kang, as well as the high-leaping Cyrus Baguio. Ortiguerra applied for the PBA draft and was selected by the Sta. Lucia Realtors in January 2001, while Co Yu Kang was left off the roster due to academic deficiencies. The rest were excluded by their veteran head coach Aric del Rosario from the team due to their continuous absences from team practices. The players' commitments to their Philippine Basketball League clubs prevented them from participating in the Tigers' preseason games.

=== Subtractions ===
Pos.	No.	Nat.	Player	Height	Year	High school	Notes
PF	7	(Philippines)	Marvin Ortiguerra	6' 5"	5th	Mapúa Institute of Technology	Forwent final year to turn professional
SG	8	(Philippines)	Cyrus Baguio	6' 2"	4th	Southwestern University	Dropped due to absences
C	9	(Philippines)	Gilbert Lao	6' 7"	5th	Uno High School	Dropped due to absences
SF	16	(Philippines)	Arnulfo Roan Tuadles, Jr.	6' 1"	3rd	Saint Francis of Assisi College	Left team for undisclosed reasons
PF	17	(Philippines)	Melchor Latoreno	6' 5"	5th	University of Santo Tomas	Graduated
C	19	(Philippines)	Kenneth Co Yu Kang	6' 5"	2nd	Jubilee Christian Academy	Transferred to José Rizal University

=== Additions ===
Pos.	No.	Nat.	Player	Height	Year	High school	Notes
SG	4	(Philippines)	Michael Anthony Sumalinog	6' 0"	1st	University of the Visayas	Rookie
C	8	(Philippines)	Marc Anthony Nanninga	6' 7"	1st	Colegio de San Juan de Letran	Rookie
PF	16	(Philippines)	Rene de Guzman	6' 3"	1st	University of Santo Tomas	Rookie
PF	20	(Philippines)	Iago Jaime Raterta	6' 3"	2nd		Returning from Season 62
PF	21	(Philippines)	Rovie Ryd Baguio		1st	University of the Visayas	Promoted from Team B

== Schedule and results ==
=== Preseason tournaments ===
Preseason game log

7th Fr. Martin Cup Invitational basketball tournament: 4–3
Game	Date • Time	Opponent	Result	Record	High points	High rebounds	High assists	Location
1	May 5	JRU Heavy Bombers	L 67–72	0–1				Rizal Memorial Coliseum, Manila
2	May 9	PCU-Dasmariñas	W 80–45	1–1				PCU Gym, Dasmariñas
3	May 16	FEU Tamaraws	L 66–68	1–2				Araneta Coliseum, Quezon City
4	May 16	St. Jude Crusaders	W 74–58	2–2				PhilSports Arena, Pasig
5	May 23	Letran Knights	W 81–75	3–2				FEU Gym, Manila
6	May 24	Mapúa Cardinals	W 57–56	4–2				FEU Gym, Manila
7	May 27	San Sebastian Stags	L 71–77	4–3				

(#) Tournament seedings in parentheses.
All times are in UTC+08:00.

=== UAAP games ===
Beginning in 2001, games were played with four 10-minute quarters and a 24-second shot clock. In the past, games were played with two 20-minute halves and a 30-second shot clock.

Elimination games were played in a double round-robin format and all of UST's games were televised on Studio 23.

UAAP Season 64 game log

Elimination round: 6–8
Game	Date • Time	Opponent	Result	Record	High points	High rebounds	High assists	Location
1	Jul 14 • 4:00 pm	FEU Tamaraws	L 59–66	0–1	Hubalde (15)			Araneta Coliseum Quezon City
2	Jul 21 • 2:00 pm	Adamson Soaring Falcons	W 66–54	1–1	Hubalde (18)	De Guzman (10)		Blue Eagle Gym Quezon City
3	Jul 26 • 5:00 pm	De La Salle Green Archers	L 73–87	1–2	Oreta (18)			PhilSports Arena Pasig
4	Jul 29 • 2:00 pm	UE Red Warriors	L 57–67	1–3	Raterta (14)	De Guzman (16)		Blue Eagle Gym Quezon City
5	Aug 4 • 1:45 pm	NU Bulldogs	L 80–83	1–4	Gelig (22)	Gelig (10)		Blue Eagle Gym Quezon City
6	Aug 9 • 2:30 pm	UP Fighting Maroons	W 71–65	2–4				Blue Eagle Gym Quezon City
7	Aug 11 • 2:00 pm	Ateneo Blue Eagles; End of R1 of eliminations	L 51–60	2–5	Gelig (14)			Araneta Coliseum Quezon City
8	Aug 19 • 2:00 pm	Adamson Soaring Falcons	W 69–55	3–5				Blue Eagle Gym Quezon City
9	Aug 25 • 4:00 pm	Ateneo Blue Eagles	W 62–55	4–5				Blue Eagle Gym Quezon City
10	Aug 30 • 2:30 pm	NU Bulldogs	L 69–72	4–6	Agleron (15)			Blue Eagle Gym Quezon City
11	Sep 1 • 2:00 pm	UP Fighting Maroons	W 58–56	5–6	Hubalde (15)			Araneta Coliseum Quezon City
12	Sep 6 • 5:00 pm	De La Salle Green Archers	L 62–64	5–7	Gelig (17)			Blue Eagle Gym Quezon City
13	Sep 8 • 4:00 pm	FEU Tamaraws	L 63–67^{OT}	5–8	Espiritu (17)			Blue Eagle Gym Quezon City
14	Sep 15 • 4:00 pm	UE Red Warriors; End of R2 of eliminations	W 76–72	6–8	Hubalde (14)			Blue Eagle Gym Quezon City

(#) Tournament seedings in parentheses.
All times are in UTC+08:00.
Source: Google News Archives

=== Postseason tournament ===
Postseason game log

National Students Basketball Championships—NCR leg: 3–2
Game	Date • Time	Opponent	Result	Record	High points	High rebounds	High assists	Location
1	Jan 15	JRU Heavy Bombers	W 81–69	1–0				Rizal Memorial Coliseum, Manila
2	Jan 16	GAUF Stallions	W 79–70	2–0	Villamin (16)			Rizal Memorial Coliseum, Manila
3	Jan 31	Benilde Blazers	W 70–59	3–0	Tied (11)			Rizal Memorial Coliseum, Manila
4	Feb 5	LPC Blue Lions; Semifinal round	L 85–86	3–1				Rizal Memorial Coliseum, Manila
5	Feb 7	San Sebastian Stags; Battle for 3rd place	L 68–76	3–2				Rizal Memorial Coliseum, Manila

(#) Tournament seedings in parentheses.
All times are in UTC+08:00.

=== Summary ===
The Tigers were tabbed as underdogs this season after the departures of key players led by Marvin Ortiguerra and Cyrus Baguio. With the 6-foot-5-inch Alwyn Espiritu as the only remaining veteran big man in the roster, the team was expected to struggle at the post. Missing from this year's lineup, aside from Ortiguerra were centers Gilbert Lao and Kenneth Co Yu Kang, and forward Mel Latoreno.

"Malaking bagay ang pagkawala ng mga players ko, lalo na't karamihan ng nawala ay iyong mga big man. Sila ang pinaka haligi, kasi kapag may malalaki kang players, mas nakaaangat ka sa depensa at rebound."
(Losing my (veteran) players was a great deal, especially since most were my big men. The team's plays were anchored on them, because with those tall players, we had the advantage in defense and rebounds.)

—Aric del Rosario

"Kailangang gumanda ang laro ng mga wing, para iyong kulang sa big man, ibabawi ko na lang sa mga wing man ko."
(We need to focus on improving the game of our wings, so that whatever we have lacking from our bigs, we can make up for with our wing men.)

—Aric del Rosario

Head coach Aric del Rosario had planned to break in tall rookies Warren de Guzman and Marc Nanninga, who were playing the forward and center positions, respectively, to aid Espiritu in rebounds and to make the job of their wing players easier. Picking up the void left by Baguio were three-point specialist Derick Hubalde, the high-leaping Niño Gelig, as well as Jake Agleron and team captain Emmerson Oreta.

==== First round ====
	1	2	3	4	Total
UST	24	8	17	17	66
Adamson	7	32	1	14	54

Adamson Soaring Falcons

The Tigers sent the Adamson Falcons to their 22nd straight loss after withstanding a gallant stand by the Falcons with a 66–54 win. Hubalde, Oreta, Gelig, and Agleron all finished in double figures with 18, 15, 13, and 11 points, respectively. Shooting a low 39 percent two-point field goal conversion, UST compensated on their outside sniping, with 33 of their total 66 points coming from beyond the arc. They made 11 out of 26 three-point shots for a 42 field goal percentage.

	1	2	3	4	Total
La Salle	24	20	27	16	87
UST	21	11	16	25	73

De La Salle Green Archers

UST suffered a 14-point 73–87 defeat at the hands of the De La Salle Green Archers. After a close-scoring first quarter, the Tigers fell behind by more than twenty points as they could not contain the Archers' Renren Ritualo and rookie Mark Cardona's scoring. They were able to pull within nine at 66–75 in the last 3:28, but Ritualo regained his shooting form by converting two of his total five three-pointers to tow his team to victory.

The Tigers have not won against the Archers since their Game 1 victory in their 1999 Finals series.

UE Red Warriors

The Tigers' outside shooting was well-scouted when the UE Red Warriors applied a zone defense on them, resulting to chief gunner Derick Hubalde's 0 for 6 shooting. Team captain Emmerson Oreta likewise was heavily defended as he finished the game with a 3 out of 11 field goal output, and none from the three-point area. The two were tallying a near 30-point combined average in their previous games. The whole team has held the highest three-point field goal average at 42 percent, but could only manage 5 out of 22 attempts against the Warriors.

Backup big man Iago Raterta took the scoring cudgels as he finished with a double-double of 14 points and 12 rebounds. Point guard Dondon Villamin added 10 points, while rookie Warren de Guzman bagged a career-high of 16 rebounds.

The Tigers who trailed the Warriors throughout the game, came closest at 4:36 in the fourth quarter when they cut down the lead by four at 55–59. In the end, UE prevailed in beating UST, 67–57.

	1	2	3	4	Total
UST	23	25	20	12	80
NU	26	18	21	19	84

NU Bulldogs

The Growling Tigers ended up in an upset loss against the NU Bulldogs when they went scoreless in the last four minutes of the game. UST was leading at 79–73 when the Bulldogs tightened their defense and limited the Tigers to a single free throw and caused them to commit five turnovers. The game ended with NU winning, 83–80. Gelig topscored for UST with 22 points, as Hubalde and Raterta added in 12 and 11 points, respectively.

UP Fighting Maroons

UST ended their three-game losing streak when they defeated the UP Fighting Maroons, 71–65. Oreta made back-to-back three-pointers to pull his team to five at 66–61 after trailing 60–61 in the last 1:20.

==== Second round ====
Ateneo Blue Eagles

Oreta once again made back-to-back baskets in the game's final seconds as the Growling Tigers ended Ateneo's seven-game winning streak with their second-round 62–55 win. UST's record improved to 4–5, reviving their chances for a Final Four qualification.

NU Bulldogs

The NU Bulldogs repeated their conquest of the Tigers with a 72–69 win as the Bulldogs came back from a 16-point deficit midway in the third quarter. Behind steady baskets from Oreta and Agleron, UST erected their biggest lead over the Bulldogs at 52–36, after Dondon Villamin's basket at 4:18 of the third period. It was then that NU began a 16–2 run to bring down the Tigers' lead to three at 55–52. The Bulldogs finally got the lead at 71–69 after Chico Manabat drove for a layup. A costly error by UST's Alwyn Espiritu in the last 43 seconds sent NU's Jeff Napa to the foul line. Napa split his charities to seal the win for the Bulldogs.

UP Fighting Maroons

The Growling Tigers rallied from an 11-point deficit in the third quarter to escape with a two-point 58–56 win over the UP Fighting Maroons in their second-round matchup. UST went on a 19–2 run at 6:36 in the third period behind Hubalde's three successive baskets to take the lead at 50–44 going into the final ten minutes of the game. Both teams went dry in offense in the next seven minutes, with the Tigers managing to score only six points, and the Maroons with a seven-point output as UST still held on to a 56–51 lead. UP came within two points at 56–58 after Mike Bravo's layup with 10.9 seconds remaining, but teammate Mark Jomalesa missed his half-court heave as time ran out. Hubalde led the Tigers with 15 points, while Oreta and Christian Luanzon added 12 and 11 points respectively.

De La Salle Green Archers

Derick Hubalde failed to tow his team to an extra period against the De La Salle Green Archers when his last-second shot attempt rimmed out of the basket. The Tigers tried to surmount a 14-point La Salle lead at the start of the fourth period, bringing the score to 59–all in the last 2:14 as Luanzon made one of his two free throws off a foul by Mike Cortez. The final minutes of the game were decided by a foul throw contest between the two squads, as UST trailed by two to three points on each stoppage. Oreta was able to pull his team to within one at 62–63 after a putback from Hubalde's miss in the last 7.3 seconds, but a split freethrow by La Salle's Cortez, and a missed jump shot by Hubalde off Luanzon's pass in the final 3.8 seconds sealed the 64–62 win for the Archers. Gelig and Oreta led the Tigers in scoring with 17 and 12 points.

FEU Tamaraws

The Tigers failed to advance to the semifinals for the first time since the Final Four format took effect in 1994. UST, who lost, 63–67 in overtime to the FEU Tamaraws fell behind the NU Bulldogs and the UE Red Warriors in the standings and ended up tied with the UP Fighting Maroons at sixth place.

UST was leading by five at 53–48 midway in the fourth quarter, but a 10–3 run behind the Tamaraws' Cesar Catli and Miko Roldan at 2:26 saw their lead vanish before Alwyn Espiritu scored to equalize at 58–all with 1:24 left in regulation. The quarter ended at 61–all, but the Tigers could not keep up with the Tamaraws in scoring as they could only convert two points in the extra period. FEU, on the other hand, made the most out of their free throws as UST kept fouling in the final two minutes to delay the game clock. Espiritu topscored for the Tigers with 17 points, while Gelig and Luanzon added 12 and 10 points.

UE Red Warriors

The Growling Tigers prevented UE from an outright entry to the semifinals when they won 76–72. UST had been eliminated from the Final Four for the first time since its implementation, while UE ended up tied at fourth place and would still need to win a knockout game for the #4 Final Four seeding.

The Tigers controlled the tempo throughout the game, with the Warriors managing to tie the score only twice, the last at the 8:34 mark in the final period when UE's Paolo Hubalde took an awkward shot for a 58–all score. Hubalde's brother Derick topscored for UST with 14 points, as three other Tigers scored in double figures. They also outrebounded their opponents 44–27.

== Awards ==
Name	Award	Date	Ref.
Team	MICABA Inter-school runners-up		
Warren de Guzman	UAAP All-rookie team	4 Oct 2001	

== Players drafted into the PBA ==
Emmerson Oreta applied for the 2005 PBA draft, but was not picked by any team. The Talk 'N Text Tropang Texters signed him as a free agent in 2009 after suiting up for the Smart-Pampanga Buddies in the 2009 Smart Liga Pilipinas Conference during the PBA's off-season.

Year	Round	Pick	Overall	Player	PBA team
2009	Signed as a free agent			Emmerson Oreta	Talk 'N Text Tropang Texters
