= 1994 UST Growling Tigers basketball team =

Men's basketball team

1994 UST Growling Tigers men's basketball

UAAP Season 57 champions

Record
- Elims rank: #3
- Final rank: #1
- 1994 record: 12–5 (8–4 elims)
- Head coach: Aric del Rosario (8th season)
- Assistant coaches: Dong Vergeire; Binky Favis
- Captain: Bal David (3rd season)

The 1994 UST Growling Tigers men's basketball team represented University of Santo Tomas in the 57th season of the University Athletic Association of the Philippines. The men's basketball tournament for the school year 1994–95 began on July 16, 1994, and the host school for the season was National University.

UST finished third at the end of the double round-robin eliminations, winning eight games against four losses. Even as the Adamson Falcons were suspended for the year due to eligibility violations involving former UST high school player Marlou Aquino, the Tigers still found themselves struggling in the first round as they barely made it to fourth place in the standings with a 3–3 record. They managed to win four straight games in the next round, including a 68–66 win over the De La Salle Green Archers which prevented them from getting their own season sweep and an outright championship.

They defeated the No. 2-ranked UE Red Warriors in two games of their Final Four pairing to overcome their twice-to-win disadvantage and advance to the Finals against La Salle. The Tigers yielded a 74–77 loss to the Archers in Game 1 of the best-of-three series, but were able to extend it to a third and deciding game after an 87–75 Game 2 victory. They had succeeded in defending the crown when they won in Game 3 by a single point at 77–76. The Tigers were able to wrest the lead from La Salle when Bal David converted both his free throws off a foul from the Archers' Elmer Lago with six seconds left. It was the team's first back-to-back title since winning a three peat from 1951 until 1953. They also helped to achieve the UAAP's first and only triple championship after their junior and women's team earlier won the titles in their respective divisions.

Dennis Espino, who had poured his frustration out of getting excluded from the Asian Games-bound national team into the Tigers' championship run was named season MVP for the second straight year. He was looking forward to representing the country and even had to drop 15 units of his college load and delay graduation just to be able to keep up with practices of both squads, but was then relegated as a reserve along with two amateur players after the Philippine Basketball Association allowed the inclusion of other professional players to the team.

== Roster ==
UST Growling Tigers roster
Players
Coaches

Pos.	No.	Nat.	Name	Height	Year	High School
PG	4	(Philippines)	Emmanuel Joel Villanueva	5'9" (1.75m)	1st	University of Santo Tomas
PF	5	(Philippines)	Edmund Reyes	6'3" (1.91m)	5th	Good Shepherd Academy
SG	6	(Philippines)	Lester Andrew del Rosario	5'11" (1.8m)	3rd	University of Santo Tomas
SF	7	(Philippines)	Francisco Guinto	6'3" (1.91m)	2nd	–
SG	8	(Philippines)	Richard Melencio	5'9" (1.75m)	1st	San Beda College
SG	9	(Philippines)	Romel David	5'10" (1.78m)	2nd	Mapúa Institute of Technology
PG	10	(Philippines)	Ramon Singson	5'11" (1.8m)	1st	Mandaue Academy
PG	11	(Philippines)	Bal David, Jr. (C)	5'9" (1.75m)	3rd	University of Santo Tomas
PF	12	(Philippines)	Richard Yee	6'4" (1.93m)	1st	Antique National School
PG	14	(Philippines)	Edfendel Lao	–	2nd	Adamson University
C	15	(Philippines)	Christopher Cantonjos	6'6" (1.98m)	2nd	Colegio de San Juan de Letran
C	16	(Philippines)	Dennis Espino	6'6" (1.98m)	5th	Holy Angel University
SG	18	(Philippines)	Henry Ong	5'11" (1.8m)	2nd	Mapúa Institute of Technology
C	19	(United States)	Chandler Tyrone Donaldson	6'5" (1.96m)	1st	–

Head coach

- (Philippines) Januario del Rosario

Assistant coach(es)

- Edward Vergeire
- Vincent Kenneth Favis

Team manager

- Benito Lim
- Timmy Koh Teng Chong

Legend

- (C) Team captain
- Injured

- Roster

=== Depth chart ===
Pos.	Starting 5	Bench 1	Bench 2
C	Espino	Cantonjos	Donaldson
PF	Reyes	Yee
SF	Guinto	Del Rosario	Melencio
SG	R. David	Ong	Lao
PG	B. David	Singson	Villanueva

== Roster changes ==
=== Subtractions ===
Pos.	No.	Nat.	Player	Height	Year	High school	Notes
PF	7	(Philippines)	Reynaldo Evangelista	6' 4"	5th	St. Peter's College of Ormoc	Graduated
SG	8	(Philippines)	Patrick Roy Fran	6' 0"	5th	Aquinas School	Graduated
SG	9	(Philippines)	Rudolf Belmonte	5' 11"	5th	San Beda College	Graduated
SF	10	(Philippines)	Alexander Tan	6' 2"	3rd		Academic deficiencies
SG	13	(Philippines)	Danilo Abugan	6' 1"	3rd		Academic deficiencies
PG	14	(Philippines)	Bethune Tanquingcen	5' 9"	4th	Philippine Cultural High School	Graduated
SF	17	(Philippines)	Generoso Tengco, Jr.	6' 0"	4th	University of Santo Tomas	Graduated
PG	18	(Philippines)	Rizaldy Ramos	5' 9"	5th	Mapúa Institute of Technology	Graduated

=== Additions ===
Pos.	No.	Nat.	Player	Height	Year	High school	Notes
PG	4	(Philippines)	Emmanuel Joel Villanueva	5' 9"	1st	University of Santo Tomas	Rookie
SG	8	(Philippines)	Richard Melencio	5' 9"	1st	San Beda College	Rookie
SG	9	(Philippines)	Romel David	5' 10"	2nd	Mapúa Institute of Technology	Returning from Season 55
PG	10	(Philippines)	Ramon Singson	5' 11"	1st	Mandaue Academy	Rookie
PF	12	(Philippines)	Richard Yee	6' 4"	1st	Antique National School	Rookie
PG	14	(Philippines)	Edfendel Lao		2nd	Adamson University	Transferred from Adamson University
SG	18	(Philippines)	Henry Ong	5' 11"	2nd	Mapúa Institute of Technology	Transferred from De La Salle University
C	19	(United States)	Chandler Tyrone Donaldson	6' 5"	1st		Rookie

== Schedule and results ==
=== UAAP games ===
Elimination games were played in a double round-robin format. All games were aired on RPN 9 by Silverstar Sports.

UAAP Season 57 game log

Elimination round: 8–4
Game	Date • Time	Opponent	Result	Record	High points	High rebounds	High assists	Location
1	Jul 20 • 1:00 pm	NU Bulldogs	W 127–102	1–0	Espino (19)			Loyola Center; Quezon City
2	Jul 23 • 3:00 pm	UP Fighting Maroons	W 82–72	2–0	David (22)			Loyola Center; Quezon City
3	Jul 26 • 3:00 pm	UE Red Warriors	L 75–84	2–1	Espino (23)			Loyola Center; Quezon City
4	Jul 30 • 1:00 pm	Ateneo Blue Eagles	W 84–66	3–1	Espino (22)			Loyola Center; Quezon City
5	Aug 7 • 5:00 pm	FEU Tamaraws	L 78–80	3–2				Loyola Center; Quezon City
6	Aug 13 • 5:00 pm	De La Salle Green Archers; End of R1 of eliminations	L 73–83	3–3				Cuneta Astrodome; Pasay
7	Aug 20 • 5:00 pm	UP Fighting Maroons	W 95–91	4–3				Loyola Center; Quezon City
8	Aug 24 • 5:00 pm	UE Red Warriors	L 74–77	4–4				Loyola Center; Quezon City
9	Aug 27 • 5:00 pm	De La Salle Green Archers	W 68–66	5–4				Cuneta Astrodome; Pasay
10	Aug 30 • 3:00 pm	Ateneo Blue Eagles	W 74–71	6–4				Loyola Center; Quezon City
11	Sep 7 • 3:00 pm	FEU Tamaraws	W 78–65	7–4	Tied (14)			Loyola Center; Quezon City
12	Sep 10 • 1:00 pm	NU Bulldogs; End of R2 of eliminations	W 81–70	8–4	Cantonjos (18)			Araneta Coliseum; Quezon City

Final Four: 2–0
Game	Date • Time	Seed	Opponent	Result	Series	High points	High rebounds	High assists	Location
1	Sep 17 • 4:45 pm	(#3)	(#2) UE Red Warriors	W 87–81	1–0 (9–4)	Reyes (24)			Cuneta Astrodome; Pasay
2	Sep 21 • 3:00 pm	(#3)	(#2) UE Red Warriors	W 83–74	2–0 (10–4)	Espino (22)			Loyola Center; Quezon City

Finals: 2–1
Game	Date • Time	Seed	Opponent	Result	Series	High points	High rebounds	High assists	Location
1	Sep 24 • 5:00 pm	(#3)	(#1) De La Salle Green Archers	L 74–77	0–1 (10–5)	Reyes (18)			Cuneta Astrodome; Pasay
2	Oct 1 • 4:30 pm	(#3)	(#1) De La Salle Green Archers	W 89–75	1–1 (11–5)	Espino (22)			Cuneta Astrodome; Pasay
3	Oct 8 • 4:00 pm	(#3)	(#1) De La Salle Green Archers	W 77–76	2–1 (12–5)	Tied (15)			Cuneta Astrodome; Pasay

(#) Tournament seedings in parentheses.
All times are in UTC+08:00.
Source: Google News Archives

=== Postseason tournaments ===
Postseason game log

1994 Battle of the Champions: 1–0
Game	Date • Time	Opponent	Result	Record	High points	High rebounds	High assists	Location
1	Dec 19 • 6:00 pm	San Sebastian Stags	W 84–81	1–0	B. David (14)			Rizal Memorial Coliseum Manila

1995 National Students Basketball Championships—NCR leg: 3–3
Game	Date • Time	Opponent	Result	Record	High points	High rebounds	High assists	Location
1	Jan 26 • 10:30 am	UM Hawks	L 74–100	0–1	Cantonjos (24)			Rizal Memorial Coliseum Manila
2	Jan 27 • 5:30 pm	Letran Knights	W 88–75	1–1	Cantonjos (27)			Rizal Memorial Coliseum Manila
3	Jan 28 • 4:00 pm	FEU Tamaraws	W 94–89^{OT}	2–1	Cantonjos (26)			Rizal Memorial Coliseum Manila
4	Jan 29 • 10:30 am	DOMC Cobras	W 91–80	3–1	Ballesteros (23)			Rizal Memorial Coliseum Manila
5 (Note: The game was stopped after a bench-clearing brawl between the two teams erupted.)	Jan 30 • 4:00 pm	UE Red Warriors	L 56–74	3–2	Carillo (13)			Rizal Memorial Coliseum Manila
6	Jan 31 • 10:30 am	UM Hawks	L 76–87	3–3	Cantonjos (27)			Rizal Memorial Coliseum Manila

(#) Tournament seedings in parentheses.
All times are in UTC+08:00.

== Awards ==
Name	Award	Date	Ref.
Team	UAAP champions	8 Oct 1994	
Dennis Espino	Season MVP	8 Oct 1994	
Dennis Espino	UAAP Mythical team	8 Oct 1994	
Henry Ong	FCBL Mythical team	20 Jun 1994	

== Players drafted into the PBA ==
Dennis Espino was picked first overall in the 1995 PBA draft by the Nat Canson-led Sta. Lucia Realtors team on January 8, 1995. Edmund Reyes and Bal David also got selected in the same rookie draft, with Reyes earning a first-round seventh overall selection and David in the third round as the 22nd pick.

Year	Round	Pick	Overall	Player	PBA team
1995	1	1	1	Dennis Espino	Sta. Lucia Realtors
1995	1	7	7	Edmund Reyes	Purefoods TJ Hotdogs
1995	3	7	22	Bal David	Sunkist Orange Juicers
