= UAAP Season 66 =

- "Olympism: Blending Sports with Culture and Education"
- Host school: Ateneo de Manila University

Overall
- Seniors: University of Santo Tomas
- Juniors: University of Santo Tomas

Seniors' champions
Sport		Men	Women
Basketball		FEU	Adamson

Juniors' champions
Sport		Boys	Girls
Basketball		Ateneo	N/A
- (NT) = No tournament; (DS) = Demonstration Sport; (Ex) = Exhibition;

UAAP Season 66 is the 2003−04 athletic year of the University Athletic Association of the Philippines (UAAP), which was hosted by the Ateneo de Manila University. The season opened on July 12, 2003

== Basketball ==
=== Elimination round ===
Pos	Team	W	L	PCT	GB	Qualification
1	Ateneo Blue Eagles (H)	11	3	.786 (Note: Head-to-head record: Ateneo 2–2, FEU 2–2, UE 2–2 (Ateneo +21, UE –5, FEU –16); second-seed playoff: FEU 80–75 UE)	—	Twice-to-beat in the semifinals
2	FEU Tamaraws	11	3	.786	—	Twice-to-beat in the semifinals
3	UE Red Warriors (Note: La Salle originally won against UE in the second round, but the UAAP Board awarded UE the win after instant replay showed that the buzzer beater that gave De La Salle the victory was not yet in the air when time expired.)	11	3	.786	—	Twice-to-win in the semifinals
4	De La Salle Green Archers (Note: This "final" team standings is overturned when La Salle forfeited their games after the Season 68 was over. See Suspension of De La Salle University for details.)	7	7	.500	4	Twice-to-win in the semifinals
5	Adamson Falcons	5	9	.357 (Note: Head-to-head record: Adamson 1–1 UST (Adamson 0, UST 0); overall point differential: Adamson –59, UST –62)	6	
6	UST Growling Tigers	5	9	.357	6	
7	UP Fighting Maroons	3	11	.214 (Note: Head-to-head record: UP 1–1 NU (UP +4))	8	
8	NU Bulldogs	3	11	.214	8	

Rules for classification: 1) winning percentage; 2) if tied for #2 or #4, one-game playoff; 3) head-to-head record; 4) head-to-head point differential; 5) overall point differential
(H) Hosts

=== Bracket ===
Semifinals (Top 2 twice-to-beat)
1	Ateneo	72	74
4	La Salle	76*	68
2	FEU	67
3	UE	63

Finals (Best-of-three playoff)
1	Ateneo	65	53
2	FEU	83	69

*Overtime

== Overall championship race ==
=== Juniors' division ===
Rank	Team	Points
1	UST	111
2	UE	96
3	DLSZ	79
4	Ateneo (H)	77
5	UPIS	62
6	NU	20
7	Adamson	12

(H) Season host.
Notes: Results are final.

=== Seniors' division ===
Rank	Team	Points
1	UST	284
2	La Salle	258
2	UP	258
4	UE	178
5	FEU	172
6	Ateneo (H)	169
7	Adamson	92
8	NU	17

(H) Season host.
Notes: Results are final.

=== Individual awards ===
Athletes of the Year:

- Men: Lloyd Escoses (FEU Tamaraws, badminton)
- Women: Marielle Benitez (De La Salle Lady Archers, football)
- Boys: Jed Angelo Magat (NU Bullpups, chess)
- Girls: Lea Coline Langit (UST Junior Tigresses, swimming)

== See also ==
- NCAA Season 79
