= 1997 PBA draft =

Player selection in Philippine basketball

General information
- Date(s): January 19, 1997
- Location: Glorietta Activity Center, Makati
- Network(s): VTV on IBC

Overview
- League: Philippine Basketball Association
- First selection: Andy Seigle (Mobiline Cellulars)

The 1997 Philippine Basketball Association (PBA) rookie draft was an event at which teams drafted players from the amateur ranks. The annual rookie draft was held on January 19, 1997, at the Glorietta Mall in Makati.

== Round 1 ==
Pick	Player	Country of origin*	PBA team	College
1	Andrew John Seigle	United States	Mobiline Cellulars	New Orleans
2	Nicholas Belasco	United States	Pop Cola Bottlers	Notre Dame-Maryland
3	Jason Webb	Philippines	Sta. Lucia Realtors	De La Salle
4	Ernesto Ballesteros	Philippines	Formula Shell Zoom Masters	UST
5	Lowell Briones	Philippines	Purefoods Corned Beef Cowboys	Visayas
6	Gabby Cui	Philippines	Sta. Lucia Realtors	Ateneo de Manila
7	Edward Naron	Philippines	Gordon's Gin Boars	Visayas
8	Angelo David	Philippines	Sta. Lucia Realtors	FEU

== Round 2 ==
Pick	Player	Country of origin*	PBA team	College
9	Tonyboy Espinosa	Philippines	Mobiline Cellulars	De La Salle
10	Romulo Marata	Philippines	Pop Cola Bottlers	Adamson
11	Ronilo Padilla	Philippines	San Miguel Beermen	Cebu
12	Freche Ang	Philippines	Purefoods Corned Beef Cowboys	Saint La Salle
13	Jay Mendoza	Philippines	Formula Shell Zoom Masters	Mapua
14	Manuel Ortega, Jr.	Philippines	Gordon's Gin Boars	SLU

== Notes ==
The top two draft picks; Andrew John Seigle and Nic Belasco were born outside the Philippines. It was the first time in league history that a pure-born Filipino player was not chosen as the overall top pick.
