= UAAP Season 61 =

University athletic year

- "The Filipino Spirit Shining through Sports"
- Host school: University of the East

Overall
- Seniors: University of Santo Tomas
- Juniors: University of Santo Tomas

Seniors' champions
Sport		Men	Women
Basketball		La Salle	FEU

Juniors' champions
Sport		Boys	Girls
Basketball		UST	N/A
- (NT) = No tournament; (DS) = Demonstration Sport; (Ex) = Exhibition;

UAAP Season 61 is the 1998–99 season of the University Athletic Association of the Philippines (UAAP) which was hosted by the University of the East. The season opened on 11 July 1998, thirty days after the nation's 100th anniversary of declaration of independence from Spain and eleven days after the installation of Joseph Ejercito Estrada as the nation's 13th president.

== Basketball ==
=== Men's tournament ===
==== Elimination round ====
Pos	Team	W	L	PCT	GB	Qualification
1	De La Salle Green Archers	13	1	.929	—	Twice-to-beat in the semifinals
2	FEU Tamaraws	11	3	.786	2	Twice-to-beat in the semifinals
3	UE Red Warriors (H)	7	7	.500	6	Twice-to-win in the semifinals
4	UST Growling Tigers	7	7	.500 (Note: Fourth–seed playoff: UST 80–72 UP)	6	Twice-to-win in the semifinals
5	UP Fighting Maroons	7	7	.500	6	
6	Ateneo Blue Eagles	5	9	.357	8	
7	NU Bulldogs	5	9	.357	8	
8	Adamson Falcons	1	13	.071	12	

Source: 1998–99 UAAP basketball tournament
Rules for classification: 1) winning percentage; 2) if tied for #2 or #4, one-game playoff; 3) head-to-head record; 4) head-to-head point differential; 5) overall point differential
(H) Hosts

==== Playoffs ====
Semifinals (Nos. 1 & 2 have twice-to-beat advantage)
La Salle	51	56
UST	55	51
FEU	68	83
UE	81	61

Finals (Best-of-three series)
1	La Salle	72	63
2	FEU	47	59

== Championships summary ==
=== Seniors Division championships ===
Rank	MEN'S											
Rank	Basketball	Volleyball	Swimming	Chess	Table tennis	Tennis	Badminton	Track and field	Taekwondo	Judo	Baseball	Football
1st	DLSU	UST	UP	UST	UP	UP	UP	UE	DLSU	UST	AdU	ADMU
2nd	FEU	FEU	DLSU	UP	DLSU	UST	UST	FEU	UST	UP	UP	UST
3rd	UE	DLSU	UST	DLSU	UE	DLSU	UE	DLSU	UP	ADMU	UST	UP
4th	UST	NU	ADMU	UE	UST	ADMU	ADMU	UST	UE	UE	DLSU	DLSU
5th	UP	AdU	UE	FEU	FEU	AdU	FEU	UP	ADMU	DLSU	NU	FEU
6th	ADMU	UP	AdU	AdU	AdU	UE	DLSU	AdU	FEU	AdU	ADMU	UE
7th	NU	UE		ADMU	NU		AdU	ADMU	AdU			
8th	AdU	ADMU		NU	ADMU		NU					

Rank	WOMEN'S										
Rank	Basketball	Volleyball	Swimming	Chess	Table tennis	Badminton	Track and field	Taekwondo	Judo	Softball	Football
1st	FEU	FEU	UST	FEU	UP	UP	FEU	DLSU	UST	AdU	DLSU
2nd	UST	DLSU	UP	UP	UST	FEU	UST		UP	UST	FEU
3rd	UP	UE	DLSU	UE	DLSU	ADMU	DLSU	ADMU; UST	ADMU	UP	UP
4th	AdU	UST	ADMU	UST	AdU	UST	AdU	UP	DLSU	DLSU	ADMU
5th	DLSU	UP	AdU	AdU	UE	DLSU	UE	UE	UE	UE	UST
6th	UE	AdU	UE	DLSU	FEU	AdU	UP	FEU	AdU	ADMU	
7th	ADMU	NU		ADMU	NU	UE	ADMU	AdU			
8th		ADMU			ADMU	NU					

=== Juniors Division championships ===
Rank	BOYS'						GIRLS'	
Rank	Basketball	Volleyball	Swimming	Chess	Table tennis	Track and field	Volleyball	Swimming
1st	USTHS	DLSZ	USTHS	ADMU	UE	AdU	DLSZ	USTHS
2nd	ADMU	ADMU & USTHS	DLSZ	AdU	AdU & ADMU	ADMU	USTHS	DLSZ
3rd	AdU	ADMU & USTHS	ADMU	UST	AdU & ADMU	USTHS	UE	AdU
4th	DLSZ	UE	AdU	UE	USTHS	UPIS	NU	UE
5th	UE	UPIS	UPIS	NU	UPIS	DLSZ	UPIS	UPIS
6th	UPIS	NU	UE		NU	UE		
7th	NU				DLSZ			

== Overall Championship race ==
The host school is boldfaced. Final.

=== Juniors' Division ===
Rank	School	Points
1st	USTHS	97
2nd	Ateneo	73
3rd	DLSZ	70
4th	Adamson	67
5th	**UE**	63
6th	UPIS	42
7th	NU	24

=== Seniors' Division ===
Rank	School	Points
1st	UST	257
2nd	UP	246
3rd	La Salle	224
4th	FEU	158
5th	**UE**	145
6th	Ateneo	127
7th	Adamson	117
8th	NU	25
