= UAAP Season 64 =

University athletic year

- "Sama-samang Harapin ang Pagsubok" (transl. Face the challenges together)
- Host school: Far Eastern University

Overall
- Seniors: University of Santo Tomas
- Juniors: Ateneo de Manila University

Seniors' champions
| Sport | | Men | Women |
| Basketball | | La Salle | La Salle |

Juniors' champions
| Sport | | Boys | Girls |
| Basketball | | UST | N/A |
- (NT) = No tournament; (DS) = Demonstration Sport; (Ex) = Exhibition;

UAAP Season 64 is the 2001–02 athletic year of the University Athletic Association of the Philippines, which was hosted by the Far Eastern University.

== Basketball ==
=== Elimination round ===
| Pos | Team | W | L | PCT | GB | Qualification |
|---|---|---|---|---|---|---|
| 1 | De La Salle Green Archers | 12 | 2 | .857 | — | Twice-to-beat in the semifinals |
| 2 | Ateneo Blue Eagles | 10 | 4 | .714 | 2 | Twice-to-beat in the semifinals |
| 3 | FEU Tamaraws (H) | 8 | 6 | .571 | 4 | Twice-to-win in the semifinals |
| 4 | NU Bulldogs | 7 | 7 | .500 (Note: Fourth-seed playoff: NU 108–102 UE (2OT)) | 5 | Twice-to-win in the semifinals |
| 5 | UE Red Warriors | 7 | 7 | .500 | 5 | |
| 6 | UST Growling Tigers | 6 | 8 | .429 | 6 | |
| 7 | UP Fighting Maroons | 6 | 8 | .429 | 6 | |
| 8 | Adamson Falcons | 0 | 14 | .000 | 12 | |

(H) Hosts

=== Bracket ===
Semifinals (Nos. 1 & 2 have twice-to-beat advantage)
1 | La Salle | 111
4 | NU | 85
2 | Ateneo | 67
3 | FEU | 63

Finals (Best-of-three series)
1 | La Salle | 74 | 72 | 93
2 | Ateneo | 68 | 76 | 88

== Overall championship race ==
=== Juniors' division ===
| Rank | Team | Points |
|---|---|---|
| 1 | Ateneo | 0 |
| 1 | – | 0 |
| 1 | – | 0 |
| 1 | – | 0 |
| 1 | – | 0 |
| 1 | – | 0 |
| 1 | – | 0 |

Notes: Results are final.

=== Seniors' division ===
| Rank | Team | Points |
|---|---|---|
| 1 | UST | 214 |
| 2 | UP | 176 |
| 3 | La Salle | 170 |
| 4 | FEU (H) | 141 |
| 5 | UE | 108.5 |
| 6 | Ateneo | 75.5 |
| 7 | Adamson | 67.5 |
| 8 | NU | 23.5 |

(H) Season host.
Notes: Results are final.

== See also ==
- NCAA Season 77
