= Estong Ballesteros =

Filipino basketball player (born 1973)

Ernesto "Estong" Ballesteros
Valenzuela City Darkhorse
- Title: Head coach
- League: MPBL

Personal information
- Born: January 28, 1973 (age 53)
- Listed height: 6 ft 5 in (1.96 m)
- Listed weight: 200 lb (91 kg)

Career information
- College: UST
- PBA draft: 1997: 1st round4th overall
- Drafted by: Shell Zoom Masters
- Playing career: 1997–2008
- Position: Small forward / power forward
- Number: 16

Career history

Playing
- 1997: Shell Turbo Chargers
- 1998: Pangasinan Presidents
- 1999: Pampanga Dragons
- 2000–2001: Pop Cola Panthers
- 2002: Coca-Cola Tigers
- 2003–2005: Barangay Ginebra Kings
- 2006–2008: Welcoat Dragons

Coaching
- 2006–2013: UST (assistant)
- 2019: UE Junior Warriors
- 2026–present: Valenzuela City Darkhorse

Career highlights
- As player: 3× PBA champion (2002 All-Filipino, 2004 Fiesta, 2004-05 Philippine); 2× UAAP champion (1995, 1996); As assistant coach: PCCL champion (2012)

Ernesto "Estong" Ballesteros (born January 28, 1973, in Manila, Philippines) is a Filipino former professional basketball player in the Philippine Basketball Association (PBA) and in Metropolitan Basketball Association (MBA). He was drafted fourth overall by Shell in 1997. He serves as a head coach for the Valenzuela City Darkhorse of the Maharlika Pilipinas Basketball League (MPBL).

== Player profile ==
Ballesteros played for several teams during his earlier career. He played for Shell, Coca-Cola, and for the Barangay Ginebra Kings. He also played in the defunct MBA for the Pangasinan Presidents and Pampanga Dragons. He was a free agent in the 2005–06 and 2006–07 seasons, but he was signed by Welcoat in the 2007–08 PBA Philippine Cup in a two-year contract.
