= UAAP Season 62 =

University Athletic Association of the Philippines

- "Bigyang Katuparan, 'Sang Kalikasan" (transl. Give importance to nature)
- Host school: University of the Philippines

Overall
- Seniors: University of Santo Tomas
- Juniors: University of Santo Tomas

Seniors' champions
Sport		Men	Women
Basketball		La Salle	La Salle

Juniors' champions
Sport		Boys	Girls
Basketball		Ateneo	N/A
- (NT) = No tournament; (DS) = Demonstration Sport; (Ex) = Exhibition;

UAAP Season 62 is the 1999–2000 athletic year of the University Athletic Association of the Philippines (UAAP) which was hosted by the University of the Philippines. The season opened on July 10, 1999, at the PhilSports Arena.

== Basketball ==
=== Men's tournament ===
The 62nd UAAP men's basketball tournament was held at the PhilSports Arena and Cuneta Astrodome from July 10 to October 9, 1999.

==== Elimination round ====
Pos	Team	W	L	PCT	GB	Qualification
1	De La Salle Green Archers	11	3	.786 (Note: First-seed playoff: La Salle 84–79 UST)	—	Twice-to-beat in the semifinals
2	UST Growling Tigers	11	3	.786	—	Twice-to-beat in the semifinals
3	Ateneo Blue Eagles	10	4	.714	1	Twice-to-win in the semifinals
4	FEU Tamaraws	9	5	.643	2	Twice-to-win in the semifinals
5	UE Red Warriors	6	8	.429	5	
6	UP Fighting Maroons (H)	5	9	.357	6	
7	NU Bulldogs	3	11	.214	8	
8	Adamson Falcons	1	13	.071	10	

(H) Hosts

==== Playoffs ====
Semifinals (Nos. 1 & 2 have twice-to-beat advantage)
1	La Salle	91
4	FEU	69
2	UST	75
3	Ateneo	74

Finals (Best-of-three series)
1	La Salle	60	81	78*
2	UST	62	74	75

*Overtime

== Overall championship race ==
=== Juniors' division ===
Rank	Team	Points
1	UST	0
1	–	0
1	–	0
1	–	0
1	–	0
1	–	0
1	–	0

Notes: Results are final.

=== Seniors' division ===
Rank	Team	Points
1	UST	256
2	UP (H)	244
3	La Salle	230
4	FEU	155
5	UE	151
6	Adamson	121
7	Ateneo	119
8	NU	23

(H) Season host.
Notes: Results are final.

== Broadcast notes ==
The UAAP games were covered by Silverstar Communications for the 10th and final season. ABS-CBN Sports will take over as the new official broadcaster of the UAAP starting on Season 63.

== See also ==
- NCAA Season 75
