= Dong Vergeire =

Filipino basketball coach

Personal information
- Born: 1965 or 1966
- Died: September 20, 2013 (aged 47)

Career information
- College: De La Salle

Career history

Coaching
- 1990–1994; 1999: UST (assistant)
- 1992–1994: Burger Machine (assistant)
- 1995–1999: San Beda
- 1996–1998: Philippines
- 1998: Pangasinan Presidents
- 2000–2003: Benilde

Career highlights
- As head coach: NCAA Champion (2000); As assistant coach: 4x UAAP champion (1993, 1994, 1995, 1996); PBL champion (1993 President Ramos Cup); As player: 2x UAAP champion (1989, 1990)
Medals
Men's basketball
Head Coach for Philippines
SEA Games
Gold medal – first place	1997 Jakarta	Team

Edward Santos Vergeire (died 2013), also known as Dong Vergeire, was a Filipino basketball coach who served as head coach of the Philippines men's national team.

As a player, Vergeire was also a former member of the De La Salle Green Archers.

He was coach of the Philippines men's national team which clinched the gold medal at the 1997 Southeast Asian Games in Jakarta.

Vergeire also coached at the National Collegiate Athletic Association (NCAA) who coached the St. Benilde to its first men's basketball title in 2000 (NCAA Season 76). He also mentored the San Beda Red Lions which lost to San Sebastian in the 1996 and 1997 finals. He also took part in the University Athletic Association of the Philippines (UAAP) in the 1990s as part of the UST Growling Tigers coaching staff under head coach Aric del Rosario

He was the first Pangasinan native to coach in the now defunct Metropolitan Basketball Association and also had a coaching stint in the Indonesian Basketball League. As an assistant to Perry Ronquillo, Vergeire helped Burger Machine of the Philippine Basketball League win a title.

Vergeire died on September 20, 2013, due to a heart attack. He was married to Geraldine Vergeire, with whom he had three children.
