= Dale Singson =

Filipino basketball player

Ramon Singson
Personal information
- Born: December 2, 1975 (age 50) Cebu City, Philippines
- Listed height: 6 ft 0 in (1.83 m)
- Listed weight: 180 lb (82 kg)

Career information
- College: UST
- PBA draft: 2000: Direct Hire
- Drafted by: Shell Turbo Chargers
- Playing career: 1999–2007
- Position: Point guard / shooting guard
- Number: 50

Career history
- 1999: Iloilo Megavoltz
- 2000–2003: Shell Turbo Chargers
- 2004–2005: San Miguel Beermen
- 2005–2006: Coca-Cola Tigers
- 2006–2007: Alaska Aces
- 2008–2010: Coca-Cola Tigers

Career highlights
- PBA All-Star (2004)

Ramon "Dale" Singson (born December 2, 1975) is a Filipino former professional basketball player. He last played for the Powerade Tigers in the Philippine Basketball Association (PBA). He plays the point guard and shooting guard positions. He was directly hired by Shell Turbo Chargers from the MBA in 2000. He was known as a scorer who could play both guard positions.

== College career ==
Singson played intercollegiate basketball with the University of Santo Tomas in the UAAP. He helped lead his alma mater to multiple championships.

== Professional career ==
Singson had a 10 year PBA career that saw him play for five teams (Shell, SMB, Coke, and Alaska).

== PBA career statistics ==
Legend
GP	Games played	MPG	Minutes per game
FG%	Field-goal percentage	3P%	3-point field-goal percentage	FT%	Free-throw percentage
RPG	Rebounds per game	APG	Assists per game	SPG	Steals per game
BPG	Blocks per game	PPG	Points per game	**Bold**	Career high

=== Season-by-season averages ===
Year	Team	GP	MPG	FG%	3P%	FT%	RPG	APG	SPG	BPG	PPG
2000	Shell	19	23.2	**.443**	.362	.655	2.2	2.4	.6	**.1**	8.6
2001	Shell	42	26.2	.411	.336	.737	2.6	3.5	**1.0**	**.1**	9.3
2002	Shell	17	23.9	.333	.300	.556	2.2	2.7	.5	**.1**	7.2
2003	Shell	35	**30.6**	.406	.256	.661	**3.2**	**5.0**	**1.0**	**.1**	**9.7**
2004–05	San Miguel	**67**	19.5	.383	.305	**.810**	2.2	2.8	.7	**.1**	4.9
2004–05	Coca-Cola	**67**	19.5	.383	.305	**.810**	2.2	2.8	.7	**.1**	4.9
2005–06	Coca-Cola	33	20.9	.345	.242	.696	2.6	2.7	.8	**.1**	6.6
2006–07	Alaska	38	14.2	.378	**.395**	.619	1.5	1.8	.4	.0	4.0
2008–09	Coca-Cola	5	8.2	.385	.286	.500	1.4	1.0	.4	.0	2.4
2009–10	Coca-Cola	8	9.8	.368	.286	.500	1.8	.9	.1	.0	2.4
Career		264	21.5	.388	.310	.694	2.3	2.9	.7	.1	6.6
