= Ateneo Blue Eagles =

Collegiate varsity teams of the Ateneo de Manila University in the Philippines

- School: Ateneo de Manila University
- League: UAAP
- Joined: 1978 (NCAA founding member – 1924)
- Location: Katipunan Avenue, Loyola Heights, Quezon City
- Venue/s: Moro Lorenzo Sports Center; Blue Eagle Gym
- Team colors: Blue and white
- Fight song: Blue Eagle the King
- Women's team: Blue Eagles
- Juniors' team: Blue Eagles

Seniors' general championships
- NCAA: 1 1968–69; UAAP: 0

The Ateneo Blue Eagles are the collegiate varsity teams of the Ateneo de Manila University that play in the University Athletic Association of the Philippines (UAAP), the premiere collegiate league in the Philippines. The Ateneo collegiate men's varsity basketball team was not always called the Blue Eagles. It got the name Blue Eagles when Ateneo adopted the Eagle as its mascot in 1938. Prior to that, from 1914 it was known under different names.

Ateneo has fifteen collegiate men's varsity teams that participate in fifteen sporting events of the University Athletic Association of the Philippines, its mother league.

== Team identity ==
=== Team monikers ===
When Ateneo started to participate in intercollegiate sports in 1914, its varsity basketball teams were simply referred to by the school community as the Ateneo Seniors and Ateneo Juniors. They were later dubbed the Blue and Whites by the sports press in the early 1920s when Ateneo joined sports leagues. When Ateneo adopted the Eagle as its mascot in 1938, the college team was given a new name: Blue Eagles. The Ateneo Blue Eagles are sometimes called the Hail Mary Quintet by the sports press. This moniker was given to the Blue Eagles in 1926 when sports press noticed that the team would pray the Hail Mary (as the school’s patroness is the Immaculate Conception) during game time-outs and would win by the skin of their teeth.

Ateneo is one of the four UAAP member schools that participate in all of the fifteen sporting events of the University Athletic Association of the Philippines. Until 2020, The Guidon, the school's official student publication, gave specific names to differentiate the various varsity teams. However, beginning with UAAP Season 84 in May 2022, Ateneo de Manila University officially decided to unify student athletes and varsity teams under the "Blue Eagles" moniker moving forward, regardless of sport, gender, or age group.

Former sport–specific monikers

Sport	Men	Women
Basketball	Blue Eagles	Lady Eagles
Football	Blue Booters	Lady Booters
Volleyball	Blue Spikers	Lady Eagles
Beach Volleyball	Blue Beach Spikers	Lady Beach Spikers
Baseball	Blue Batters	No team
Softball	No team	Lady Batters
Badminton	Blue Shuttlers	Lady Shuttlers
Tennis	Blue Netters	Lady Netters
Table Tennis	Blue Paddlers	Lady Paddlers
Track & Field	Blue Tracksters	Lady Tracksters
Swimming	Blue Tankers	Lady Tankers
Fencing	Blue Fencers	Lady Fencers
Judo	Blue Judokas	Lady Judokas
Taekwondo	Blue Jins	Lady Jins
Chess	Blue Woodpushers	Lady Woodpushers

=== Mascot and colors ===
Ateneo has long been involved in intercollegiate sports dating back to 1914. It was a pioneer in Philippine collegiate sports. Ateneo was the first Philippine school to adopt a mascot, and was also the first school to field an organized cheering squad with cheerleaders which was later followed by another first when it introduced a Pep Band to augment the cheerleaders during games.

The choice of an eagle as school mascot holds iconic significance. Conferred with the title "the King", the Blue Eagle is a reference to the "high-flying" Ateneo varsity teams which would "swoop down on the foe and sweep up the fields away" as a dominating force in the field of sports. Furthermore, there is some mythological significance to the eagle as a symbol of power.

The school used to have live eagles as pets in the former Padre Faura campus and later on at the Grade School campus in Loyola Heights. A live Philippine eagle would lead the men's varsity basketball team at the start of a game in the NCAA as the team enters the basketball court for their warm-up with the school Band playing the fight song, "Blue Eagle – The King". This tradition that began in the 1960s was replaced in the late 1980s due to wildlife concerns. One of the donors of the eagles was Mayor Dick Gordon straight from his private estate in Olongapo, of which the stuffed eagle has since been displayed at the school Biology laboratory. A mascot was made in its stead. Blue and White, being the colors of the school's patroness, the Blessed Virgin Mary, were chosen as the school's colors.

Thus, blue and white are the colors of the uniforms of the varsity teams. Most of the school songs, yells and cheers have the words blue and white.

== Athletic associations ==
=== Collegiate leagues ===
The Ateneo de Manila University is a member of the University Athletic Association of the Philippines, the premiere sports league in the country. It fields teams in all fifteen sporting events of the league. Ateneo was a founding member of the National Collegiate Athletic Association, which was established in 1924. It left the NCAA in 1978 due to the league-wide violence prevalent at the time, and then joined the UAAP in the same year.

=== Other tournaments ===
Aside from the UAAP, the Ateneo Blue Eagles also participate during the UAAP preseason in other sports leagues/tournaments such as the Filoil EcoOil Preseason Cup, V-League, Shakey's Super League, and Ang Liga.

== Team sports ==
=== Volleyball ===
The Ateneo Volleyball Program enjoyed a modest success in the NCAA, having won a total of nine championships during a ten-year period from 1967 to 1976. The men's team had two titles and one from the women's, while the juniors team had won six titles. Ateneo dominated NCAA volleyball in the mid-1970s. In the UAAP, Ateneo has won five championships so far since transferring from the NCAA in 1978. These titles were won by the Lady Eagle Spikers in Season 76 (2013–14), Season 77 (2014–15) and Season 81 (2018–19) and by the Blue Eagle Spikers in Season 77 (2014–15), Season 78 (2015–16) and Season 79 (2016–17), finally ending a title drought of more than 30 years in UAAP volleyball.

==== Championships ====
Men's		Reference
NCAA (2)	Season 51 (1975–76); Season 52 (1976–77)	
UAAP (3)	Season 77 (2014–15); Season 78 (2015–16); Season 79 (2016–17)	
Women's
NCAA (1)	Season 52 (1976–77)	
UAAP (3)	Season 76 (2013–14); Season 77 (2014–15); Season 81 (2018–19)	

==== Double Championships ====
Men's / Women's		Reference
NCAA Season (1)	Season 52 (1976–77)	
UAAP Season (1)	Season 77 (2014–15)	

==== UAAP Finals Appearances ====
Finals Appearances		Ref.
Men's (5)	Season 76 (2013–14); Season 77 (2014–15); Season 78 (2015–16); Season 79 (2016–17); Season 80 (2017–18)	
Women's (7)	Season 74 (2011–12); Season 75 (2012–13); Season 76 (2013–14); Season 77 (2014–15); Season 78 (2015–16); Season 79 (2016–17); Season 81 (2018–19)	

=== Football ===
The Ateneo varsity football teams have won a total 19 championships, 9 in the NCAA and 10 in the UAAP. In the NCAA, the seniors have won 6 titles. The men's team were the first to win a football championship in the NCAA when they won the title on the maiden season of the NCAA in 1924. They also won their first back-to-back (1953 and 1954) championship in the NCAA. In the UAAP, the seniors (men) have won 8 titles. The men's team were three-peat champions after winning in Seasons 2003–04, 2004–05 and 2005–06, a record that still holds today. Football was introduced in the UAAP Juniors Division as a demonstration sport in season 70 (2007–08) and declared a regular sport in season 72 (2009–10). Dov Cariño went on to represent the Philippines national football team in the 2024 ASEAN Championship where he make his debut on 18 December 2024 against Vietnam becoming the first person to played for the national team while still in the team.

Football Championships

Men's
NCAA Season (6)

- 1924–25
- 1941–42
- 1951–52
- 1953–54
- 1954–55
- 1967–68

Men's
UAAP Season (8)

- 1995–96
- 1998–99
- 2003–04
- 2004–05
- 2005–06
- 2012–13
- 2016–17
- 2018–19

Women's
UAAP Season

==== Notable football players ====
===== Men's Division =====
- Virgilio "Baby" Dalupan
- Luis "Moro" Lorenzo
- Edgardo "Ed" Ocampo
- Jarvey Gayoso
- Dov Cariño

===== Women's Division =====
- Camille Rodriguez
- Joyce Semacio

=== Baseball ===
==== Baseball Championships ====
Men's
NCAA Season (2)	1927–28; 1965–66
UAAP Season (4)	2012–13; 2013–14; 2014–15; 2016–17

==== Notable baseball players ====
===== Men's Division =====
- Ambrosio "Paddy" Padilla
- Kirk Long

=== Softball ===
Ateneo fielded a women's team when the UAAP Softball Championship was revived in 1994.

== UAAP Championships Record ==
The following tables show the rankings history of the Ateneo Blue Eagles in the UAAP since Season 50, while full statistics are available for Seasons 68 onwards.

=== Collegiate division ===
- Gold border denotes general championship season.
- Red border denotes host of the season.

X – Cancelled
* – Did Not Participate
- – Not part of UAAP sports calendar
Italics – Demonstration sport (no points toward general championship)

==== 1987–1995 ====
When Ateneo first joined the UAAP in 1978, only ten sports were included in the league calendar, including softball which was discontinued from 1985 to 1995.

UAAP Season	Collegiate Division														Overall rank	
UAAP Season	Basketball		Volleyball		Swimming		Chess	Tennis	Table tennis		Baseball	Football	Athletics		Total; Points	Rank
UAAP Season	M	W	M	W	M	W	M	M	M	W	M	M	M	W	-	-
50	1st	2nd									5th	5th				
51	1st										5th	4th				
52	4th										4th	2nd				
53	3rd										5th	5th				
54	5th										5th	4th				
55	5th										6th	6th				
56	6th		8th	6th							6th	7th				
57	6th		6th	5th							6th	6th				

==== 1995–2005 ====
Combat sports including taekwondo, judo, and fencing were introduced throughout the mid-1990s along with the introduction of badminton, women's chess, women's tennis, women's football, and the reintroduction of softball.

UAAP Season	Collegiate Division																										Overall rank	
UAAP Season	Basketball		Volleyball		Swimming		Chess		Tennis		Table tennis		Badminton		Taekwondo		Judo		Baseball	Softball	Football		Athletics		Fencing		Total Points	Rank
UAAP Season	M	W	M	W	M	W	M	W	M	W	M	W	M	W	M	W	M	W	M	W	M	W	M	W	M	W	-	-
58	7th		8th	5th				–		–			1st						6th		1st				–	–		
59	5th	7th	*	6th	6th	4th	8th	–	4th	–	7th	8th	1st	2nd	T5	5th			6th	5th	2nd	2nd	6th	7th	2nd	–	131	4th
60	6th		8th	*				–		–							1st		6th	6th	2nd					–		
61	6th	7th	8th	8th	4th	4th	7th	7th	4th	–	8th	8th	4th	3rd	5th	3rd	3rd	3rd	6th		1st	4th	7th	7th		–	127	6th
62	3rd		8th	8th						–									6th		2nd					–	119	7th
63	3rd		8th	8th					1st	–									6th		2nd							
64	2nd		8th	6th					1st	–									6th		3rd						75.5	6th
65	1st		8th	6th															5th		2nd						174	5th
66	2nd		8th	6th										1st					6th		1st						169	6th
67	2nd	2nd	8th	7th													1st		4th		1st						201	4th

==== 2005–present ====
The final UAAP sports were added throughout the new millennium including beach volleyball, poomsae, 3x3 basketball, and blitz chess.

UAAP Season	Collegiate Division																																	Overall rank	
UAAP Season	Basketball		3X3 Basketball		Volleyball		Beach volleyball		Swimming		Chess		Blitz chess		Tennis		Table tennis		Badminton		Taekwondo			Judo		Baseball	Softball	Football		Athletics		Fencing		Total Points	Rank
UAAP Season	M	W	M	W	M	W	M	W	M	W	M	W	M	W	M	W	M	W	M	W	M	W	C	M	W	M	W	M	W	M	W	M	W	-	-
68	2nd	1st	–	–	8th	5th	–	–	3rd	4th	7th	6th	–	–	4th	4th	6th	3rd	6th	6th	5th	5th	–	4th	5th	3rd	6th	1st	5th	3rd	3rd	4th	2nd	208	4th
69	2nd	3rd	–	–	5th	5th	–	–	3rd	3rd	7th	4th	–	–	3rd	3rd	5th	4th	3rd	4th	4th	4th	–	3rd	3rd	5th	5th	4th	4th	3rd	6th	1st	3rd	219	3rd
70	3rd	1st	–	–	7th	4th	5th	2nd	4th	2nd	7th	7th	–	–	4th	2nd	7th	6th	6th	6th	3rd	4th	–	3rd	2nd	5th	6th	2nd	4th	3rd	6th	5th	2nd	213	4th
71	1st	6th	–	–	4th	5th	T7	7th	4th	1st	8th	6th	–	–	4th	3rd	6th	5th	6th	7th	2nd	4th	–	1st	5th	3rd	5th	6th	4th	4th	3rd	2nd	1st	197.5	5th
72	1st	6th	–	–	3rd	3rd	7th	5th	2nd	2nd	8th	2nd	–	–	4th	3rd	7th	4th	3rd	8th	3rd	5th	–	1st	4th	6th	5th	4th	5th	3rd	4th	5th	2nd	222	4th
73	1st	7th	–	–	6th	4th	7th	6th	3rd	2nd	5th	6th	–	–	3rd	2nd	7th	5th	2nd	7th	5th	6th	–	1st	5th	4th	5th	6th	4th	4th	4th	2nd	3rd	206	5th
74	1st	5th	–	–	7th	2nd	8th	2nd	3rd	2nd	7th	3rd	–	–	6th	4th	7th	5th	1st	2nd	5th	6th	–	3rd	5th	2nd	5th	5th	5th	5th	6th	5th	5th	207	5th
75	1st	4th	–	–	6th	2nd	7th	7th	1st	2nd	7th	7th	–	–	6th	5th	7th	6th	2nd	1st	6th	7th	–	4th	5th	1st	7th	1st	4th	6th	6th	2nd	5th	205	3rd
76	5th	8th	–	–	2nd	1st	6th	3rd	3rd	2nd	7th	8th	–	–	5th	5th	8th	6th	1st	1st	6th	5th	3rd	1st	2nd	1st	7th	7th	3rd	5th	6th	3rd	4th	224	4th
77	4th	5th	–	–	1st	1st	5th	8th	1st	1st	6th	8th	–	–	6th	5th	8th	6th	3rd	2nd	6th	7th	5th	2nd	2nd	1st	7th	4th	3rd	7th	7th	7th	3rd	216	4th
78	3rd	2nd	–	–	1st	2nd	1st	3rd	1st	1st	7th	8th	–	–	4th	3rd	8th	8th	3rd	2nd	5th	6th	5th	1st	4th	2nd	7th	2nd	3rd	6th	7th	6th	6th	238	3rd
79	2nd	6th	–	–	1st	2nd	6th	8th	1st	2nd	7th	8th	–	–	4th	4th	8th	8th	2nd	2nd	7th	3rd	5th	2nd	5th	1st	7th	1st	3rd	6th	6th	4th	2nd	233	3rd
80	1st	6th	6th	3rd	2nd	3rd	4th	5th	1st	1st	8th	8th	–	–	2nd	2nd	8th	8th	3rd	3rd	6th	2nd	5th	T1	5th	3rd	7th	3rd	4th	6th	5th	5th	4th	228.5	4th
81	1st	6th	1st	5th	3rd	1st	7th	5th	1st	1st	7th	8th	–	–	2nd	3rd	8th	6th	3rd	1st	6th	5th	6th	2nd	5th	2nd	7th	1st	5th	6th	6th	3rd	1st	237	T3
82	1st	6th	X	X	X	X	8th	3rd	1st	1st	8th	4th	–	–	X	X	7th	2nd	2nd	1st	5th	6th	6th	3rd	5th	X	X	X	X	X	X	2nd	3rd	162	3rd
83	Cancelled due to COVID-19 pandemic.																																		
84	2nd	–	6th	5th	–	3rd	5th	–	–	5th	4th	–	–	–	–	–	–	–	–	–	–	–	5th	–	–	–	–	–	–	–	–	–	–	58	5th
85	1st	4th	8th	3rd	5th	6th	3rd	7th	1st	3rd	5th	3rd	–	–	2nd	4th	2nd	3rd	2nd	1st	6th	6th	3rd	4th	4th	6th	4th	2nd	5th	8th	8th	3rd	5th	248	4th
86	4th	4th	8th	5th	5th	5th	4th	5th	1st	2nd	2nd	3rd	–	–	2nd	4th	2nd	2nd	1st	1st	6th	6th	5th	4th	3rd	3rd	5th	4th	4th	8th	8th	5th	5th	250	4th
87	8th	4th	8th	1st	5th	7th	7th	6th	1st	1st	5th	4th	4th	1st	5th	5th	2nd	3rd	2nd	2nd	6th	4th	5th	4th	4th	6th	5th	2nd	5th	7th	8th	5th	5th	218	4th
88	6th	3rd	2nd	3rd	4th	7th	3rd	5th	1st	2nd	4th	5th	4th	3rd	7th	5th	2nd	4th	1st	1st	3rd	6th	5th	3rd	5th	6th	5th	5th	3rd	5th	8th	5th	5th	260	4th

==== Special Events ====
UAAP Season	Collegiate Division							
UAAP Season	Cheerdance	Streetdance	Esports			Golf		Ballroom Formation
UAAP Season	C	C	2K	V	ML	M	W	C
57	6th	–	–	–	–	–	–	–
58	7th	–	–	–	–	–	–	–
59	5th	–	–	–	–	–	–	–
60	–	–	–	–	–	–	–	–
61	4th	–	–	–	–	–	–	–
62	6th	–	–	–	–	–	–	–
63	7th	–	–	–	–	–	–	–
64	6th	–	–	–	–	–	–	–
65	5th	–	–	–	–	–	–	–
66	4th	–	–	–	–	–	–	–
67	4th	–	–	–	–	–	–	–
68	7th	–	–	–	–	–	–	–
69	5th	–	–	–	–	–	–	–
70	4th	–	–	–	–	–	–	–
71	4th	–	–	–	–	–	–	–
72	2nd	–	–	–	–	–	–	–
73	4th	3rd	–	–	–	–	–	–
74	7th	3rd	–	–	–	–	–	–
75	5th	*	–	–	–	–	–	–
76	8th	–	–	–	–	–	–	–
77	8th	2nd	–	–	–	–	–	–
78	8th	4th	–	–	–	–	–	–
79	7th	6th	–	–	–	–	–	*
80	8th	6th	–	–	–	–	–	–
81	7th	7th	–	–	–	–	–	*
82	7th	X	–	–	–	–	–	–
83	Cancelled due to COVID-19 pandemic.							
84	8th	–	–	–	–	–	–	–
85	8th	5th	–	–	–	–	–	*
86	8th	4th	1st	3rd	T7	–	–	–
87	8th	5th	1st	3rd	T7	–	–	–
88	8th	4th	TBD	TBD	TBD	2nd	3rd	–

== Championships ==
Overall/General Championships
Ateneo has not won a UAAP General Championship in the seniors division since joining the UAAP in 1978. Its best finish was a third place in Season 75 (2012–13) and Season 79 (2016–17).

- Seniors:
  - NCAA (1) – 1968–69

3x3 Basketball Championships

- Men's: (Tournaments from 2017–18 until 2018–19 were classified as a Demonstration Sport)
  - UAAP (1) – 2018–19
- Women's:
  - UAAP (1) - 2024-2025

Athletics Championships

- Men's: (Tournaments from 1925–26 until 1952–53 consisted of events in relay and track and field)
  - NCAA (9) – 1925–56 (relay), 1934–35 (relay), 1949–50 (T/F), 1960–61, 1965–66, 1966–67, 1967–68, 1968–69, 1969–70

Badminton Championships

- Men's:
  - UAAP (6) – 1995–96, 1996–97, 2011–12, 2013–14, 2023–24, 2025–26
- Women's:
  - UAAP (8) – 2003–04, 2012–13, 2013–14, 2018–19, 2019–20, 2022–23, 2023–24, 2025–26

Baseball Championships

- Men's:
  - NCAA (2) – 1927–28, 1965–66
  - UAAP (4) – 2012–13, 2013–14, 2014–15, 2016–17

Basketball Championships

- Men's:
  - NCAA (14) – 1928–29, 1931–32, 1932–33, 1933–34, 1937–38, 1941–42, 1953–54, 1954–55, 1957–58, 1958–59, 1961–62, 1969–70, 1975–76, 1976–77
  - UAAP (12) – 1987–88, 1988–89, 2002–03, 2008–09, 2009–10, 2010–11, 2011–12, 2012–13, 2017–18, 2018–19, 2019–20, 2022–23
- Women's:
  - UAAP (2) – 2005–06, 2007–08

Beach Volleyball Championships

- Men's:
  - UAAP (1) – 2015–16

Esports Championships

- NBA 2K:
  - UAAP (2) – 2024–25, 2025–26

Fencing Championships

- Women's:
  - UAAP (2) – 2006–07, 2018–19

Football Championships

- Men's:
  - NCAA (6) – 1924–25, 1941–42, 1951–52, 1953–54, 1954–55, 1967–68
  - UAAP (8) – 1995–96, 1998–99, 2003–04, 2004–05, 2005–06, 2012–13, 2016–17, 2018–19

Judo Championships

- Men's:
  - UAAP (8) – 1997–98, 2004–05, 2008–09, 2009–10, 2010–11, 2013–14, 2015–16, 2017–18

Swimming Championships

- Men's:
  - UAAP (11) – 2012–13, 2014–15, 2015–16, 2016–17, 2017–18, 2018–19, 2019–20, 2022–23, 2023–24, 2024–25, 2025–26
- Women's:
  - UAAP (7) – 2008–09, 2014–15, 2015–16, 2017–18, 2018–19, 2019–20, 2024–25

Tennis Championships

- Men's:
  - NCAA (1) – 1939–40
  - UAAP (2) – 2000–01, 2001–02

Volleyball Championships

- Men's:
  - NCAA (2) – 1975–76, 1976–77
  - UAAP (3) – 2014–15, 2015–16, 2016–17
- Women's:
  - NCAA (1) – 1976–77
  - UAAP (3) – 2013–14, 2014–15, 2018–19

== Sports traditions ==
The Ateneo has several traditions related to sports. Most of these traditions have been introduced by the American Jesuits after they took over the administration of Ateneo in 1912.
