= 2021 UST Growling Tigers basketball team =

Men's basketball team

2021 UST Growling Tigers men's basketball

Record
- Elims rank: #7
- Final rank: #7
- 2021 record: 3–11
- Head coach: Jino Manansala (1st season)
- Assistant coaches: McJour Luib; Joph Cleopas
- Captain: Paul Manalang (1st season)

The 2021 UST Growling Tigers men's basketball team represented the University of Santo Tomas in the 84th season of the University Athletic Association of the Philippines. The men's basketball tournament for the academic year 2021–22 began in the second semester on March 26, 2022, and the host school for the season was De La Salle University.

The Tigers tied their second worst record in the Final Four era after winning only three games against eleven losses which they also had in the 2016 season. After ending the first round of eliminations on a 2–5 record, the team won only one game before going on a six-game losing streak to end the tournament, which was marred by blowout losses that broke the UAAP record for the largest losing margins.

They began their season with a 25-point loss against the FEU Tamaraws in a game played behind closed doors. The UAAP had earlier decided to hold the first four playing schedules under a bubble setup in observance of COVID-19 safety precautions. UST had five more blowout losses in the season that included their 44-point marginal defeat against FEU in their last playing date in the second round to surpass their 43-point loss to the De La Salle Green Archers back in 2016. Their 50-point loss to the Ateneo Blue Eagles in the second round set the mark for the league's biggest losing margin since recordkeeping became official in 2003. They also lost against the NU Bulldogs by 31 points in the first round, and by 29 points each to La Salle and the UP Fighting Maroons in the second round. Their 83–112 defeat against the Green Archers enabled their opponents to breach the 100-point barrier in the season.

== Roster ==
UST has listed Ivan Lazarte, Rafael Pangilinan, Rafael Biag, and Patrick Javier on their reserve list, where any of the four players can be activated to replace players who would test positive for COVID-19.

UST Growling Tigers roster
Players
Coaches

| Pos. | No. | Nat. | Name | Height | Year | High School |
|---|---|---|---|---|---|---|
| PF | 4 | (Philippines) | Christian Manaytay | 6'4" (1.93m) | 1st | Sacred Heart School–Ateneo de Cebu |
| C | 5 | (Philippines) | Ian Joseph Herrera | 6'6" (1.98m) | 1st | La Salle Greenhills |
| SF | 6 | (Philippines) | Josemaria Ignacio Gómez de Liaño | 6'5" (1.96m) | 1st | UP Integrated School |
| PG | 7 | (Philippines) | Joshua Fontanilla | 5'11" (1.8m) | 4th | St. Clare College of Novaliches |
| PF | 8 | (Philippines) | Sherwin Concepcion | 6'3" (1.91m) | 2nd | Malayan High School of Science |
| SG | 9 | (Philippines) | Nicael Dominie Cabañero | 6'3" (1.91m) | 1st | University of Santo Tomas |
| SG | 10 | (Philippines) | Aldave Dale Canoy | 6'1" (1.85m) | 1st | West Negros University Integrated School |
| SF | 12 | (Australia) | Royce Deakin Mantua | 6'4" (1.93m) | 1st | Far Eastern University–Diliman |
| SF | 13 | (Philippines) | Bryan Samudio | 6'4" (1.93m) | 1st | Malayan High School of Science |
| C | 14 | (Philippines) | Arnold Dave Ando | 6'7" (2.01m) | 3rd | University of San Jose–Recoletos |
| PG | 16 | (Philippines) | Paul Matthew Manalang (C) | 5'10" (1.78m) | 1st | Nazareth School of National University |
| SF | 17 | (Philippines) | Miguel Pangilinan | 6'2" (1.88m) | 2nd | Nazareth School of National University |
| PG | 18 | (Philippines) | Renzel Symon Yongco | 6'1" (1.85m) | 1st | Saint Jude Catholic School |
| SG | 20 | (Philippines) | JC Alvin Garing | 5'9" (1.75m) | 2nd | Divine Word College of Legazpi |
| SG | 24 | (Philippines) | Jonathan Ralf Gesalem | 6'1" (1.85m) | 1st | Sacred Heart School–Ateneo de Cebu |
| PF | 26 | (Philippines) | Bryan Santos | 6'5" (1.96m) | 4th | San Luis National High School |

Head coach

- (Philippines) Jino Manansala

Assistant coach(es)

- McJour Luib
- Jose Felix Cleopas
- Jason Misolas
- Rodolfo Carlos Jr.
- Jude Anthony Paulite

Team manager

- Ryan David Roxas

Legend

- (C) Team captain
- Injured

- [ Roster]

=== Depth chart ===

| Pos. | Starting 5 | Bench 1 | Bench 2 | Bench 3 |
|---|---|---|---|---|
| C | Ando | Santos | Herrera |
| PF | Concepcion | Manaytay | Gómez de Liaño |
| SF | M. Pangilinan | Mantua | Canoy | Samudio |
| SG | Cabañero | Garing | Gesalem |
| PG | Fontanilla | Manalang | Yongco |

== Roster changes ==
"For the past three years, I have been turning off so many offers in Europe. My plan was to finish my playing years in UST but since COVID came, it destroyed everyone's plans. I hope you guys will understand me. Thank you for all the love and support, and good luck to the team on the upcoming season."

— Soulémane Chabi Yo

13 out of the 16 players from the 2019 UAAP runner-up team have departed. Renzo Subido, Zach Huang, and Enric Caunan have already graduated, while the majority went on to transfer to rival colleges at the height of the school's training bubble controversy. Season 82 Most Valuable Player Soulémane Chabi Yo forwent his final playing year in the collegiate ranks to play in the Liga EBA in Spain. The extended lockdowns and the cancellation of Season 83, despite the league's extension of eligibility of players caused the Beninese center's exit from the team. Chabi Yo transferred from Colegio de San Lorenzo in 2018, when the UCBL champion roster got disbanded. International scouts had shown interest in him from as far back as the preseason in 2019, when the Tigers competed in the NBA–China tournament.

"We are grateful that Jordi chose UST. He will be a big boost to our depleted team and we hope our basketball system will greatly enhance his development as a student-athlete."

— Jino Manansala, Growling Tigers head coach

The official lineup for UST's Season 84 campaign consisted of three holdovers, eight transferees, three rookies, and two players from their Team B training pool. Among the rookies are Jordi Gómez de Liaño and Nic Cabañero. Gómez de Liaño, younger brother of the prolific UP Fighting Maroons' Juan and Javi, decided to play for UST at the end of his high school career to make a name for himself and not be in the shadows of his siblings. The lanky 6-foot-5 forward was one of the UAAP's best scorers in the juniors' division in Season 82, where he averaged 13.0 points, 4.1 rebounds, and 1.8 assists per game, with a 30-percent outside shooting accuracy while playing for the UPIS Junior Maroons. He was also selected to the U-16 national team that was set to compete in the 2019 FIBA Asia Championship in Beirut prior to COVID-19 cancellations. His commitment was much needed by the UST community after their program was dealt a heavy blow with their mainstays transferring out in light of the training bubble issue during the pandemic lockdowns.

"First of all, the school's quality of education is one of the best, and their basketball program has a winning culture, though they're undergoing a revamp right now. But I believe that we can get back to being competitive. I wasn't able to play in my senior high school year, but I remain focused on my future. I'm just going to show what I've got in the collegiate level."

— Nic Cabañero

Cabañero, a 6-foot-3 athletic wingman from Cebu was recruited by former coach Aldin Ayo from San Beda in 2019, after the Red Cubs won the NCAA Season 95 juniors championship. He was set to play for the Tiger Cubs the following year, but the tournaments were cancelled due to the pandemic. His 2019 season averages were 6.2 points, 2.2 rebounds, and 1.7 assists in 12 games. The three freshmen are all eligible for five playing years beginning in Season 84.

"Getting Joshua was important because we need someone to take Renzo's place. We were searching for a point guard and his tall height was an added bonus."

— Aldin Ayo, former head coach

Other notable players suiting up for the Tigers for the first time are Joshua Fontanilla, Bryan Santos, Christian Manaytay, Aldave Canoy, and Bryan Samudio. The 5-foot-11 Fontanilla was recruited by Ayo in 2019 to replace the graduating Subido. The shifty veteran point guard who led Saint Clare College of Caloocan to three straight NAASCU championships averaged 10.2 points, 4.5 rebounds, 6.2 assists, and 1.8 steals per game in his last season with the Saints.

Santos transferred from the Technological Institute of the Philippines in May 2020 after the TIP Engrineers basketball team got disbanded due to inaction from suspended sporting events during the COVID-19 pandemic. The 6-foot-5 forward who used to be a member of FEU's Team B training pool was an anchor in the post for the Engineers in their campaign in the UCBL.

"Christian Manaytay had originally committed to La Salle. We were looking for bigs and he was being passed up for their one-and-dones, so he left La Salle and transferred to us."

— Aldin Ayo

Manaytay, a 6-foot-4 power forward, transferred from La Salle in 2019 when he lost his spot in their roster to the team's one-and-done Filipino American recruits. In high school, he led the Ateneo de Cebu Magis Eagles to a runner-up finish in the 2017 CESAFI juniors tournament, where he was selected to the Mythical team.

Canoy transferred from the West Negros University in 2020, where he helped the Mustangs reach the 2018 NOPSSCEA seniors finals during his rookie year. He led the Junior Mustangs to win the boys' championship the previous year with a game-high of 28 points. Samudio was recruited from the Malayan High School of Science Red Robins, champions of the 2016 NCAA Juniors tournament, where he was named Finals MVP of the championship series.

The team was entering the season without a foreign student-athlete to man the paint. The Tigers have secured Chabi Yo's replacement in Senegalese Adama Faye. Faye, a 6-foot-8 big man who had transferred from National University went back to his hometown in Dakar before the start of the UAAP season, supposedly to have his passport renewed. Team officials negotiated for his timely return, but according to reports, some requests made by the player to the management were denied, which resulted to his exclusion from the roster. Third-year Dave Ando is left to man the front line, aided by newcomers Santos and Ian Herrera.

=== Departures ===
| Pos. | No. | Nat. | Player | Height | Year | High school | Notes |
|---|---|---|---|---|---|---|---|
| PF | 0 | (Philippines) | Ira Spencer Bataller | 6' 4" | 3rd | Arellano University High School | Transferred to Colegio de San Juan de Letran |
| SF | 3 | (Philippines) | Brent Isaac Paraiso | 6' 2" | 4th | De La Salle Santiago Zobel School | Transferred to Colegio de San Juan de Letran |
| PG | 5 | (Philippines) | Henri Lorenzo Subido | 5' 9" | 5th | De La Salle Santiago Zobel School | Graduated |
| PG | 6 | (Philippines) | Mark Nonoy | 5' 8" | 2nd | University of Santo Tomas | Transferred to De La Salle University |
| SG | 10 | (Philippines) | Rhenz Joseph Abando | 6' 2" | 4th | Bactad East National High School | Transferred to Colegio de San Juan de Letran |
| C | 11 | (Philippines) | Enrique Caunan Jr. | 6' 5" | 5th | Colegio de San Juan de Letran | Graduated |
| SF | 13 | (Philippines) | Zachary Lance Eden Huang | 6' 4" | 5th | Sacred Heart School–Ateneo de Cebu | Graduated |
| PF | 16 | (Philippines) | Nathaniel Cosejo | 6' 3" | 3rd | De La Salle Santiago Zobel School | Transferred to Emilio Aguinaldo College |
| SF | 19 | (Philippines) | Ferdinand Asuncion Jr. | 6' 2" | 2nd | Chiang Kai-shek College | Transferred to Mapúa University |
| SG | 21 | (Philippines) | Alberto Bordeos Jr. | 6' 0" | 1st | La Salle Greenhills | Academic deficiencies |
| C | 23 | (Benin) | Soulémane Chabi Yo | 6' 6" | 2nd | Université d'Abomey-Calavi | Forwent eligibility to turn professional |
| SG | 27 | (Philippines) | Crispin John Cansino | 6' 2" | 3rd | University of Santo Tomas | Transferred to the University of the Philippines |
| SG | 30 | (Philippines) | Vince Petdeo Cuajao | 6' 1" | 2nd | Holy Child College of Davao | Transferred to De La Salle University |

=== Acquisitions ===
| Pos. | No. | Nat. | Player | Height | Year | High school | Notes |
|---|---|---|---|---|---|---|---|
| PF | 4 | (Philippines) | Christian Manaytay | 6' 4" | 1st | Sacred Heart School–Ateneo de Cebu | Transferred from De La Salle University |
| C | 5 | (Philippines) | Ian Joseph Herrera | 6' 6" | 2nd | La Salle Greenhills | Transferred from De La Salle University |
| SF | 6 | (Philippines) | Josemaria Ignacio Gómez de Liaño | 6' 5" | 1st | UP Integrated School | Rookie |
| PG | 7 | (Philippines) | Joshua Fontanilla | 5' 11" | 4th | St. Clare College of Novaliches | Transferred from St. Clare College of Caloocan |
| SF | 9 | (Philippines) | Nicael Dominie Cabañero | 6' 3" | 1st | University of Santo Tomas | Rookie |
| SG | 10 | (Philippines) | Aldave Dale Canoy | 6' 1" | 1st | STI WNU Integrated School | Transferred from STI West Negros University |
| SF | 12 | (Australia) | Royce Deakin Mantua | 6' 4" | 1st | Far Eastern University–Diliman | Rookie |
| SF | 13 | (Philippines) | Bryan Samudio | 6' 4" | 1st | Malayan High School of Science | Promoted from Team B |
| PG | 16 | (Philippines) | Paul Matthew Manalang | 5' 10" | 1st | Nazareth School of National University | Transferred from the University of the East |
| PG | 18 | (Philippines) | Renzel Symon Yongco | 6' 1" | 1st | Saint Jude Catholic School | Transferred from De La Salle University |
| SG | 20 | (Philippines) | JC Alvin Garing | 5' 9" | 2nd | Divine Word College of Legazpi | Transferred from Lyceum of the Philippines University |
| PG | 24 | (Philippines) | Jonathan Ralf Gesalem | 6' 1" | 1st | Sacred Heart School–Ateneo de Cebu | Promoted from Team B |
| PF | 26 | (Philippines) | Bryan Santos | 6' 5" | 4th | San Luis National High School | Transferred from the Technological Institute of the Phils. |

=== Recruiting class ===
| Name | Pos. | Height | High school | Hometown | Commit date | Ref. |
|---|---|---|---|---|---|---|
| Renzel Yongco | PG | 6' 1" | Saint Jude Catholic School | Cagayan de Oro | 2 May 2018 | |
| Renzel Yongco | 2015 NBTC Top 24 player (All-Star game participant with White Team) | | | | | |
| Paul Manalang | PG | 5' 10" | Nazareth School of NU | San Fernando, Pampanga | 4 Mar 2019 | |
| Paul Manalang | 2016 NBTC Top 24 rank: N/A (National Finals Division 1 champion with Nazareth School) | | | | | |
| Paul Manalang | 2018 NBTC Top 24 rank: N/A (National Finals #5 seed, Division 1 champion with Nazareth School) | | | | | |
| Bryan Samudio | SF | 6' 4" | Malayan High School of Science | Bocaue | 25 Nov 2019 | |
| Bryan Samudio | 2017 NBTC Top 24 rank: N/A (National Finals Division 1 semifinalist with Malayan High School) | | | | | |
| Christian Manaytay | PF | 6' 4" | SHS–Ateneo de Cebu | Roxas City | 22 Nov 2019 | |
| Christian Manaytay | 2017 NBTC Top 24 rank: N/A (National Finals Division 1 finalist with Ateneo de Cebu) | | | | | |
| Christian Manaytay | 2018 NBTC Top 24 rank: N/A (National Finals #8 seed, Division 1 semifinalist with Ateneo de Cebu) | | | | | |
| JJ Gesalem | SG | 6' 1" | SHS–Ateneo de Cebu | Mandaue | 11 May 2019 | |
| JJ Gesalem | 2018 NBTC Top 24 rank: N/A (National Finals #8 seed, Division 1 semifinalist with Ateneo de Cebu) | | | | | |
| Jordi Gómez de Liaño | SF | 6' 5" | UP Integrated School | Mandaluyong | 10 Jun 2021 | |
| Jordi Gómez de Liaño | 2018 NBTC Elite 60 rank: 41 | | | | | |
| Jordi Gómez de Liaño | 2020 NBTC UAAP Top 24 rank: 22 | | | | | |
| Nic Cabañero | SF | 6' 3" | University of Santo Tomas | Lapu-Lapu City | 16 Jun 2021 | |
| Nic Cabañero | 2018 NBTC Elite 60 rank: 50 | | | | | |
| Nic Cabañero | 2018 NBTC Top 24 rank: N/A (National Finals #7 seed, Division 1 quarterfinalist with San Beda) | | | | | |
| Nic Cabañero | 2019 NBTC Top 24 rank: N/A (National Finals #4 seed, Division 1 semifinalist with San Beda) | | | | | |
| Royce Mantua | SF | 6' 4" | Far Eastern University–Diliman | Sydney | 15 Jun 2021 | |
| Royce Mantua | 2018 NBTC Elite 60 rank: 22 | | | | | |
| Royce Mantua | 2019 NBTC Top 24 rank: N/A (National Finals #15 seed, Division 1 semifinalist with FEU–Diliman) | | | | | |
The National Basketball Training Center (NBTC) is a grassroots program in the Philippines that develops and ranks outstanding players from high schools who compete in a five month-long nationwide youth basketball tournament. The program has enabled local coaches to recruit skilled players to play collegiate basketball.

== Coaching changes ==
Aldin Ayo resigned as head coach of the Growling Tigers on September 4, 2020, amid ongoing investigations on the team's training bubble controversy. The UAAP later handed Ayo an indefinite ban from all league-sanctioned activities, having found the seasoned coach liable in endangering the health and well-being of his team by holding a training camp during the pandemic.

Resigned assistant coach and Tiger Cubs head coach Jino Manansala was called back by the Institute of Physical Education and Athletics (IPEA) and was appointed interim coach of the team to replace Ayo on October 8, 2020. IPEA earlier announced the start of the basketball program's rebuilding phase as it was moving forward without a permanent head coach.

Returning with Manansala were assistant coaches McJour Luib, Joph Cleopas, JR Carlos, and Jason Misolas. Ryan Roxas took over as team manager, together with UST's dean of Civil Law Nilo Divina as sponsor to replace Jimi Lim after his Ironcon Builders withdrew its support to the team.

== Schedule and results ==
Elimination games were played in a double round-robin format and all of UST's games were televised on One Sports and the UAAP Varsity Channel.

UAAP Season 84 game log

Elimination round: 3–11
| Game | Date • Time | Opponent | Result | Record | High points | High rebounds | High assists | Location |
|---|---|---|---|---|---|---|---|---|
| 1 | Mar 26 • 10:34 am | FEU Tamaraws | L 51–76 | 0–1 | Fontanilla (19) | Gomez de Liaño (11) | Tied (3) | Mall of Asia Arena; Pasay |
| 2 | Mar 29 • 7:16 pm | UP Fighting Maroons | L 82–98 | 0–2 | Concepcion (19) | Manaytay (7) | Tied (4) | Mall of Asia Arena; Pasay |
| 3 | Mar 31 • 7:06 pm | UE Red Warriors | W 74–62 | 1–2 | Concepcion (25) | Santos (12) | Fontanilla (8) | Mall of Asia Arena; Pasay |
| 4 | Apr 2 • 4:00 pm | Adamson Soaring Falcons | W 79–72 | 2–2 | Manalang (15) | Santos (8) | Manalang (5) | Mall of Asia Arena; Pasay |
| 5 | Apr 5 • 10:12 am | De La Salle Green Archers | L 66–75 | 2–3 | Tied (20) | Cabañero (10) | Manaytay (2) | Mall of Asia Arena; Pasay |
| 6 | Apr 7 • 1:00 pm | NU Bulldogs | L 51–82 | 2–4 | Cabañero (11) | Cabañero (8) | Cabañero (3) | Mall of Asia Arena; Pasay |
| 7 | Apr 9 • 4:00 pm | Ateneo Blue Eagles; End of R1 of eliminations | L 80–91 | 2–5 | Concepcion (22) | Cabañero (9) | Fontanilla (6) | Mall of Asia Arena; Pasay |
| 8 | Apr 12 • 4:30 pm | UE Red Warriors | W 72–61 | 3–5 | Concepcion (17) | Ando (12) | Fontanilla (5) | Mall of Asia Arena; Pasay |
| 9 | Apr 19 • 12:35 pm | De La Salle Green Archers | L 83–112 | 3–6 | Manalang (14) | Tied (7) | Fontanilla (6) | Mall of Asia Arena; Pasay |
| 10 | Apr 21 • 10:05 am | Ateneo Blue Eagles | L 51–101 | 3–7 | Cabañero (18) | Fontanilla (7) | Fontanilla (4) | Mall of Asia Arena; Pasay |
| 11 | Apr 23 • 10:05 am | Adamson Soaring Falcons | L 69–80 | 3–8 | Fontanilla (23) | Concepcion (11) | Manalang (5) | Mall of Asia Arena; Pasay |
| 12 | Apr 26 • 7:00 pm | NU Bulldogs | L 60–73 | 3–9 | Cabañero (13) | Cabañero (15) | Fontanilla (4) | Mall of Asia Arena; Pasay |
| 13 | Apr 28 • 7:03 pm | UP Fighting Maroons | L 67–96 | 3–10 | Pangilinan (21) | Tied (7) | Tied (4) | Mall of Asia Arena; Pasay |
| 14 | May 1 • 12:42 pm | FEU Tamaraws; End of R2 of eliminations | L 65–109 | 3–11 | Cabañero (16) | Ando (6) | Fontanilla (3) | Mall of Asia Arena; Pasay |

(#) Tournament seedings in parentheses.
All times are in UTC+08:00.
Source: Imperium Technology

== UAAP statistics ==
| Player | GP | GS | MPG | FGM | FGA | FG% | 3PM | 3PA | 3P% | FTM | FTA | FT% | RPG | APG | SPG | BPG | TOV | PPG |
|---|---|---|---|---|---|---|---|---|---|---|---|---|---|---|---|---|---|---|
| Nic Cabañero | 14 | 7 | 25.4 | 62 | 159 | 39.0 | 12 | 49 | 24.5 | 38 | 68 | 55.9 | 6.3 | 1.5 | 1.0 | 0.1 | 2.9 | 12.4 |
| Joshua Fontanilla | 14 | 10 | 23.1 | 60 | 154 | 39.0 | 10 | 39 | 25.6 | 33 | 50 | 66.0 | 3.6 | 3.8 | 0.9 | 0.0 | 4.6 | 11.6 |
| Sherwin Concepcion | 14 | 12 | 26.6 | 52 | 149 | 34.9 | 33 | 111 | 29.7 | 12 | 20 | 60.0 | 5.6 | 0.7 | 0.5 | 0.1 | 1.4 | 10.6 |
| Paul Manalang | 14 | 5 | 24.6 | 28 | 95 | 29.5 | 22 | 72 | 30.6 | 28 | 31 | 90.3 | 2.9 | 2.6 | 0.9 | 0.1 | 2.0 | 7.7 |
| Bryan Santos | 11 | 3 | 18.1 | 25 | 77 | 32.5 | 13 | 50 | 26.0 | 8 | 15 | 53.3 | 5.9 | 0.5 | 0.6 | 0.3 | 0.8 | 6.5 |
| Christian Manaytay | 14 | 4 | 15.9 | 25 | 58 | 43.1 | 0 | 2 | 0.0 | 19 | 36 | 52.8 | 3.9 | 0.9 | 0.4 | 0.4 | 1.4 | 4.9 |
| Dave Ando | 14 | 7 | 14.8 | 26 | 68 | 38.2 | 1 | 15 | 6.7 | 4 | 15 | 26.7 | 5.3 | 0.3 | 0.3 | 0.6 | 1.0 | 4.1 |
| Migs Pangilinan | 14 | 8 | 17.4 | 18 | 59 | 30.5 | 7 | 37 | 18.9 | 15 | 18 | 83.3 | 3.1 | 0.2 | 0.4 | 0.5 | 1.4 | 4.1 |
| Jordi Gomez de Liaño | 12 | 1 | 5.5 | 9 | 34 | 26.5 | 7 | 27 | 25.9 | 0 | 1 | 0.0 | 1.6 | 0.3 | 0.3 | 0.0 | 0.3 | 2.1 |
| Royce Mantua | 11 | 4 | 9.2 | 7 | 33 | 21.2 | 5 | 20 | 25.0 | 2 | 3 | 66.7 | 1.5 | 0.3 | 0.3 | 0.0 | 0.8 | 1.9 |
| Jamba Garing | 10 | 1 | 9.2 | 5 | 13 | 38.5 | 2 | 7 | 28.6 | 2 | 4 | 50.0 | 1.2 | 0.6 | 0.5 | 0.0 | 0.8 | 1.4 |
| Aldave Canoy | 9 | 0 | 4.1 | 4 | 7 | 57.1 | 1 | 3 | 33.3 | 4 | 5 | 80.0 | 0.2 | 0.1 | 0.1 | 0.3 | 0.3 | 1.4 |
| Ian Herrera | 12 | 3 | 7.8 | 5 | 20 | 25.0 | 2 | 13 | 15.4 | 2 | 4 | 50.0 | 2.5 | 0.2 | 0.2 | 0.2 | 0.0 | 1.2 |
| Renzel Yongco | 10 | 4 | 7.0 | 3 | 12 | 25.0 | 2 | 11 | 18.2 | 0 | 0 | 0.0 | 0.3 | 0.5 | 0.0 | 0.0 | 0.4 | 0.8 |
| Bryan Samudio | 9 | 0 | 3.0 | 2 | 6 | 33.3 | 0 | 0 | 0.0 | 1 | 1 | 100.0 | 0.7 | 0.1 | 0.0 | 0.0 | 0.6 | 0.6 |
| JJ Gesalem | 7 | 1 | 5.8 | 1 | 12 | 8.3 | 1 | 9 | 11.1 | 0 | 0 | 0.0 | 0.4 | 0.3 | 0.0 | 0.0 | 0.4 | 0.4 |
| Total | 14 | | 40.0 | 332 | 956 | 34.7 | 118 | 465 | 25.4 | 168 | 271 | 62.0 | 42.9 | 12.0 | 5.9 | 2.3 | 18.6 | 67.9 |
| Opponents | 14 | | 40.0 | 449 | 1,004 | 44.7 | 121 | 406 | 29.8 | 171 | 280 | 61.1 | 49.8 | 18.3 | 11.0 | 3.5 | 15.9 | 84.9 |

Source: Imperium Technology

Legend
| GP | Games played | GS | Games started | MPG | Minutes per game |
| FGM | Field-goal made | FGA | Field-goal attempts | FG% | Field-goal percentage |
| 3PM | 3-point field-goal made | 3PA | 3-point field-goal attempts | 3P% | 3-point field-goal percentage |
| FTM | Free-throw made | FTA | Free-throw attempts | FT% | Free-throw percentage |
| RPG | Rebounds per game | APG | Assists per game | SPG | Steals per game |
| BPG | Blocks per game | TOV | Turnovers per game | PPG | Points per game |

== Summary of games ==
The Growling Tigers were on an uptrend after an illustrious Season 82 campaign, where they finished as runners-up to the undefeated Ateneo Blue Eagles. Their trip to the Finals was as remarkable, when after finishing the elimination rounds at fourth place, they went through the stepladder semifinals in two do-or-die playoff series. Their buildup for the next season was derailed by the COVID-19 pandemic, where the team's training bubble got exposed by their former team captain's removal from the roster. The investigations led to the resignation of their head coach, Aldin Ayo, as well as the mass transfer of their players to rival teams.

UST's management installed former Growling Tiger Jino Manansala as the new coach with the intent of having Ayo's Mayhem system in continuity, and also due to Manansala's coaching record of having won multiple titles in the NAASCU. The team has also retained as assistant coach, McJour Luib, Ayo's long-time deputy, who is more than capable of implementing their former coach's game plans.

"Our team has really been depleted, and we were hoping to rush things and be ready when the tournaments begin. We're a long way to go and we continue to seek good replacements for the losses we suffered. Aside from our holdovers, we're mostly composed of new recruits. We will never know how far we've gone and how ready we would be until the actual games resume. It's hard to form a competitive team given all the IATF restrictions, but we're taking it with baby steps through our Zoom trainings. We're relying much on the individual responsibility of each player to be ready. We're staying afloat despite the pandemic because of the endearing commitment of our remaining players as well as the hopeful driving dreams of our newcomers. We are exercising the utmost patience given the circumstances."

— Jino Manansala

The defending three-peat champion Ateneo and a retooled UP Fighting Maroons team are considered the teams to beat for Season 84 according to the coaches during the UAAP's media launch at the TV5 Media Center in Mandaluyong on March 23, 2022. All of the tacticians agreed that their projections were based on limited resources and information, as scouting other teams proved to be difficult due to the ongoing pandemic.

The cancelation of Season 83 resulted to a long offseason, where blue chip recruits and transferees who needed to establish their residencies are now eligible to play. Teams who have stockpiled on new talents are seen to hold an advantage over the rest of the field.

"I think that (the absence of preseason games) it's a disadvantage, but I also think that every team is undergoing the same thing in terms of adjustment. At the end of the day, there would be a lot of unknowns (scouting-wise) at the start of the season."

— Tab Baldwin, Ateneo head coach

Local basketball analyst and TV personality Mhel Garrido projected the Tigers to be in the lower half of the standings. Not having the 6-foot-8 Faye in the roster, nor an agile local big to protect the paint will be a hindrance to them in winning games. Garrido expects UST to battle it out for sixth place with the Adamson Soaring Falcons and the NU Bulldogs. ESPN Philippines, meanwhile, gave the team's recruitment effort an F rating after the 180-degree turn of their program. The key to their success in the upcoming season lies on how quickly they can get back up on their feet in terms of recruitment and in reestablishing Ayo's tried-and-tested Mayhem system.

=== First round ===
FEU Tamaraws

| | 1 | 2 | 3 | 4 | Total |
|---|---|---|---|---|---|
| UST | 9 | 9 | 17 | 16 | 51 |
| FEU | 22 | 25 | 13 | 16 | 76 |

The Growling Tigers' return to the hardcourt after two years was met by an overwhelming 25-point, 51–76 defeat at the hands of the FEU Tamaraws. They were staring at a 19-point deficit after a scoreless stretch, with the first quarter ending at 9–22 in favor of the Tamaraws. Rookie Nic Cabañero ended the dry spell midway in the second period after a layup for an 11–28 count. FEU's RJ Abarrientos then unleashed a barrage of three-pointers to spark a 13–4 run, with the half ending at 47–18.

The second half saw UST's struggle in scoring and repeated turnovers, which caused the deficit to swell to 30. Joshua Fontanilla tried to keep the Tigers within the game, scoring 11 straight points late in the final period, but his efforts proved to be futile as the Tamaraws had an answer for each of the shots that they made. Despite outscoring FEU in the second half at 33–29, UST was unable to overcome their opponent's big lead. The Tamaraws took advantage of their weak frontcourt, as they outrebounded the Tigers, 57–40. Their defense also made the UST's perimeter scoring suffer, where they made only 8 out of their 34 outside shot attempts.

Fontanilla finished with a game-high of 19 points on a 50-percent, 8-of-16 field goal conversion. Cabañero added 12 points, as only two players scored in double-digits. UST's veteran tandem of Sherwin Concepcion and Dave Ando had a combined 9-point contribution, with Concepcion hitting 3-of-9 shots from the field, while Ando went for 1-of-8.

UP Fighting Maroons

| | 1 | 2 | 3 | 4 | Total |
|---|---|---|---|---|---|
| UST | 25 | 23 | 15 | 19 | 82 |
| UP | 16 | 26 | 36 | 20 | 98 |

The Growling Tigers could not sustain their double-digit lead in the first half, as they allowed the UP Fighting Maroons to grab control of the game which resulted to a 16-point, 82–98 loss for UST.

Sherwin Concepcion's hands waxed hot from beyond the arc to start the game, as he buried four three-pointers to give the Tigers an 18–7 advantage. The first quarter ended with UST having a 9-point, 25–16 lead. Miguel Pangilinan continued the charge, scoring five points midway in the second period via a three-point play and converting both baskets at the charity stripe, for a 39–27 count. Another and-1 by Pangilinan widened the gap to 13 points, before the Maroons made their own 8–0 run towards the end of the half to come within six, at 42–48.

The second half began with another UP rally. The Maroons' Carl Tamayo converted on the equalizer, before teammate Ricci Rivero knocked down a triple to put their team in command, at 51–48. UP ended up scoring 36 points in the third period, behind a series of runs, as they erected a 15-point, 78–63 lead after James Spencer's three-point shot.

The Maroons' lead ballooned to 21 in final period, at 67–88, with six minutes left on the clock. Paul Manalang's three-pointer was the Tigers' last attempt at a comeback, as UST could not convert. A fouled Fontanilla made only one of his two free throws to put his team to within 18, at 71–88.

Concepcion topscored for the Tigers with 19 points. Fontanilla, Cabañero, and Pangilinan added 17, 16, and 13 points, as UST stayed winless with a 0–2 record.

| | 1 | 2 | 3 | 4 | Total |
|---|---|---|---|---|---|
| UST | 25 | 11 | 14 | 24 | 74 |
| UE | 24 | 15 | 14 | 9 | 62 |

UE Red Warriors

"I give credit to the players for not giving up. It was a hard-fought game, but down the stretch, we found our strength and composure, so we were able to snatch the win."

— Jino Manansala

The Growling Tigers were finally able to post their first win of the season at the expense of the UE Red Warriors. They were trailing at 55–60 early in the fourth quarter until a Concepcion-led 19–2 run ignited the Tigers. The second-year forward who made back-to-back three-pointers to cap their rally, topscored for UST with a career-high of 25 points, on a 6-of-9 shooting. Cabañero and Christian Manaytay added 12 points, each, while Bryan Santos had a double-double of 10 points and 12 rebounds.

Adamson Soaring Falcons

| | 1 | 2 | 3 | 4 | Total |
|---|---|---|---|---|---|
| Adamson | 16 | 25 | 17 | 14 | 72 |
| UST | 19 | 26 | 19 | 15 | 79 |

UST notched their second straight win after defeating the Adamson Soaring Falcons, 79–72. The Tigers were up by two, at 72–70 late in the fourth quarter, when Fontanilla scored five straight points to increase their lead to seven, at 77–70 with under 20 seconds remaining. The Falcons' Jerom Lastimosa made a basket in the last 11 seconds to come within five, and then fouled Cabañero to stop the clock. The rookie made both free throws for the final count and the win for UST.

The Tigers got their outside shooting going, making 33 percent from the arc, with team captain Manalang going for 5-of-7 to topscore with 15 points.

De La Salle Green Archers

| | 1 | 2 | 3 | 4 | Total |
|---|---|---|---|---|---|
| La Salle | 23 | 19 | 19 | 14 | 75 |
| UST | 16 | 11 | 17 | 22 | 66 |

The Growling Tigers' short winning streak came to a halt after a 66–75 loss against the De La Salle Green Archers. After leading at 5–4 at the start of the game, the Tigers fell prey to a 17–2 run by the Archers. La Salle's Emman Galman hit back-to-back baskets, as their rally ended with a three-pointer from Cabañero that sparked UST's own 7–0 run for a 14–21 count.

The Archers exposed the Tigers' weakness on the frontcourt by dominating the second period. La Salle's Kurt Lojera and CJ Austria took turns in scoring in the paint to increase the Archers' lead over UST to 17 points, at 42–25. The Tigers continued to struggle against La Salle's bigs in the third quarter, as the Archers' Mike Phillips was even able to score a thunderous dunk from an assist by former Tiger Mark Nonoy near the end of the period.

UST showed signs of life when Santos, coming off the bench, scored two jumpers from the distance to bring his team to within 11, at 52–63. Cabañero and Fontanilla also got going to bring La Salle's lead down at 56–65. The Archers were able to widen the distance again, after Ben Phillips made consecutive shots, only to be stopped when teammate Evan Nelle got called for an unsportsmanlike foul and gave the Tigers the opportunity to score four straight points, for a 62–71 count. Nelle recovered and teamed up with Justine Baltazar to keep UST at bay and notch the victory for La Salle.

Fontanilla and Cabañero each scored 20 points for UST, who have now fallen to 2–3 in the standings.

| | 1 | 2 | 3 | 4 | Total |
|---|---|---|---|---|---|
| NU | 16 | 19 | 25 | 22 | 82 |
| UST | 13 | 18 | 9 | 11 | 51 |

NU Bulldogs

UST suffered a 31-point, 51–82 blowout loss against the NU Bulldogs. The game was closely-fought in the first half, with the Tigers trailing NU by four points, at 31–35, but the Bulldogs found their bearings and clamped down on their defense against UST. The Tigers were limited to only 9 points in the third period against NU's 25, as the Bulldogs' Shaun Ildefonso scored all of his 10 points in the quarter. NU shot a high 65-percent field goal conversion, making 11-of-17, while the Tigers went only 4-of-20, going into the final period. UST was not able to recover, as the deficit ballooned to 31 points at the end of the game, after former Tiger Germy Mahinay finished with a layup.

Cabañero scored 11 points, making only 4 of his 17 field goal attempts. Concepcion also struggled with his three-point shooting, with a 2-of-7 clip to finish with 10 points. The Tigers' record now stands at 2–4.

| | 1 | 2 | 3 | 4 | Total |
|---|---|---|---|---|---|
| UST | 19 | 14 | 25 | 22 | 80 |
| Ateneo | 27 | 23 | 24 | 17 | 91 |

Ateneo Blue Eagles

The Growling Tigers lost for the third straight time since their back-to-back wins, this time yielding to the undefeated Ateneo Blue Eagles by 11 points, at 80–91. Ateneo blazed to a hot start, scoring 27 big points against UST's 19 to end the first quarter, and then continued the trend in the next period. The Eagles' Matthew Daves made a three to give his team a 20-point, 50–30 lead, before Cabañero scored his own triple at the end of the half.

"UST has always been like that. We ended up giving away 80 points, which was a little bit high, but we're happy that we came out with the win."

— Sandy Arespacochaga, Ateneo assistant coach

The Tigers began the second half with a 10–0 run, with Cabañero, Concepcion, and Fontanilla alternating baskets to bring their team to within seven, at 43–50. Ateneo's Gian Mamuyac scored five straight points at the end of the third quarter to give the Eagles a 16-point, 74–58 advantage. Ateneo's Tyler Tio spearheaded an 8–0 run at the start of the final period to extend the Eagles' lead to 24, at 82–58. UST made their own run to bring down the lead to single digits, but the breaks still went Ateneo's way, as they eventually won the game.

Concepcion topsored for the Tigers with 22 points, with Manalang adding 10. Three other players scored 9 apiece, as UST ended the first round of eliminations with a 2–5 record.

=== Second round ===
"If we made our free thows, they would have covered for the deficit, don't you think? So, yes, they really need (to put their time in) practice, and then with the turnovers, we need to make our adjustments to limit them to just eight to twelve. That should be the limit."

— Jino Manansala

"The team needs to adjust—me, especially because I'm one of the seniors here, so it's not right for me to commit most of our team's turnovers."

— Joshua Fontanilla

The Growling Tigers ended the first round of eliminations with a 2–5 record for a sixth place ranking in the team standings, above the winless UE Red Warriors and the Adamson Soaring Falcons who hold a 1–6 record. They have a full week to prepare for the second round as the league takes a break from the Lenten Holy Week. The team's turnovers and missed free throws make up the biggest factors in their losses. In their first-round game against Ateneo, the Tigers made only 10 of their 23 free throw attempts. Concepcion, who paced the team with 22 points missed both of his foul shots, while the rookie Cabañero was 1-of-5. They rank sixth in the league in charity conversions with a 53.8 clip and second in turnovers with 18 per game. They also have a low average of assists per game with only 12, putting their assists-to-turnover ratio at a negative.

Starting point guard Joshua Fontanilla leads the team in turnovers with 4.4 per game.

"He (Fontanilla) needs to limit his errors, because, while he scores 18 to 21 points, he turns the ball over five times. It's always regretful when that happens."

— Jino Manansala

With the absence of a dominating center to replace former foreign student-athlete Chabi Yo, the Tigers produced the fewest points in the paint among the eight teams in the first round with only 23.14, while allowing 42.6 points scored by their opponents, which was the league's highest. Their inability to collar rebounds was evident, having placed eighth and last with only 7.9 per game. UST's strength, rather lay in their perimeter shooting, where they placed second behind Ateneo with 35.6 points per game.

Three players averaged in double-digit scoring for UST, with the second-year Concepcion landing fifth in the league with 13.4 points per game. Fontanilla and Cabañero are the team's other topscorers, with 12.9 and 12.6 points per game, respectively. Fontanilla ranks fourth in the league in assists, with a 3.6 per-game average.

As one of the three holdovers from the pre-pandemic UST roster, Concepcion has taken on the task of being a veteran leader to a team of newcomers.

"This task isn't easy, but I cannot think of it that way anymore. Before the pandemic, I was still a rookie, and now I suddenly became a senior, so now I have to look after my new teammates. I don't really monitor my high scores, I'm just repaying the trust that my coaches, my teammates, and the UST community have given me."

— Sherwin Concepcion

| | 1 | 2 | 3 | 4 | Total |
|---|---|---|---|---|---|
| UE | 21 | 9 | 24 | 7 | 61 |
| UST | 11 | 17 | 23 | 21 | 72 |

UE Red Warriors

Barring a sluggish start, UST was able to pull off a 72–61 victory over the still-winless UE Red Warriors to start their second-round campaign and end a three-game losing streak.

The Tigers were trailing UE throughout the first three quarters of the game, with as many as 10 points in the first period, at 11–21. They outscored the Warriors in the second quarter, and even limited them to only 9 points, but they still found themselves trailing by 2, at 28–30, going into the halftime break. UE's Kyle Paranada and Harvey Pagsanjan maintained their team's safe lead with clutch baskets, but a triple by Concepcion near the end of the third period temporarily gave UST 51–50 lead. The quarter ended with the Tigers trailing at 51–54.

Fontanilla led a 9–0 run to start the final period for a six-point, 60–54 lead. Pagsanjan kept the Warriors afloat, trading baskets with the Tigers to stay within five, at 61–66, with less than four minutes remaining. It was when Cabañero made a successful three-point play, leading UST to break away from UE for an eight-point, 69–61 count. The Warriors' Jojo Antiporda missed a three-point attempt with under a minute left. Concepcion's own three at the 36-second mark put the game away for good.

Concepcion led the Tigers with 17 points, with a 5-of-9 three-point conversion, as Dave Ando broke out with a career-high of 16 points, coupled with 12 rebounds for a double-double outing. The rookie Cabañero added 11 points, as UST's bench outscored UE, 36–13.

De La Salle Green Archers

| | 1 | 2 | 3 | 4 | Total |
|---|---|---|---|---|---|
| UST | 21 | 25 | 15 | 22 | 83 |
| La Salle | 36 | 22 | 28 | 26 | 112 |

The Growling Tigers suffered another blowout loss, this time at the hands of the De La Salle Green Archers with an 83–112 setback in their second-round meeting. The Archers shot the lights out from the get-go, scoring 36 big points in the first quarter against UST's 21. The game began with La Salle's 29–8 run, but the Tigers' three-point shooting kept them within 12 at the end of the half, at 46–58. The Archers' Schonny Winston took control at the start of the second half, scoring 19 of his team's 28 points on 9-of-11 field goals to bury UST with a 25-point, 61–86 advantage. He ended up outscoring the Tigers, 19–15 in the third period. The lead went up to as high as 32 points in the final quarter, after La Salle's Galman made a triple for a 110–78 count. The Archers became the first team to score at least a hundred points in a UAAP game since UST's 101 points in 2019.

Team captain Paul Manalang and Bryan Santos topscored for the Tigers with 14 and 13 points as they dropped to a 3–6 record. Their 22 turnovers did them in, with the Archers converting 21 points off them.

Ateneo Blue Eagles

| | 1 | 2 | 3 | 4 | Total |
|---|---|---|---|---|---|
| Ateneo | 22 | 24 | 34 | 21 | 101 |
| UST | 8 | 13 | 15 | 15 | 51 |

UST found themselves on the wrong side of history after being dealt with a 50-point, 51–101 loss by the Ateneo Blue Eagles. It was the biggest recorded margin in the UAAP since statistics were first computerized in 2003.

The Tigers struggled as they trailed the Eagles, 4–20 at the start of the game and ended up scoring only eight points at the end of the first quarter. The first half ended with Ateneo having a comfortable 25-point, 46–21 lead, but their press on the boys from España did not end there. They poured in 34 points against UST's 15 to end the third period with a 44-point, 80–36 advantage. The lead ballooned to 53 points, at 101–48 in the final 41 seconds of the game after the Eagles' Forthsky Padrigao made an undergoal basket. The Tigers were outmatched defensively by their opponent, as they got outrebounded, 32–49 and were held to a low percentage of 28.6 field goal conversion that even resulted to having their shot attempts blocked eight times. Ateneo's defense-to-offense transition resulted to 27 assists against only 12 by UST.

Cabañero was the only Tiger to score in double-digits, with 18 points. The Eagles' defense affected Concepcion and Fontanilla's shooting, with the forward scoring only 5 points on a 2-of-10 field goal, while missing all 8 of his three-point shots. The crafty point guard finished the game with 8 points on a 4-of-11 clip, as he missed his lone three-point attempt.

Adamson Soaring Falcons

| | 1 | 2 | 3 | 4 | Total |
|---|---|---|---|---|---|
| UST | 21 | 19 | 12 | 17 | 69 |
| Adamson | 22 | 19 | 25 | 14 | 80 |

The Growling Tiger fell prey to the Adamson Soaring Falcons' defensive masterclass in the third quarter and yielded a 69–80 loss that extended their downward skid to three games. UST was going toe-to-toe with their opponents, as they ended the half trailing by only one point, at 40–41, but the Falcons stepped on the gas pedal at the start of the third period. Adamson's Lastimosa led a 20–4 attack, as the Falcons broke away with a 17-point, 61–44 lead at the 2:35 mark. They ended up scoring 25 points in the quarter, while limiting the Tigers to only 12 points.

Adamson's lead had stretched to 23, at 77–54, following a three-pointer by the Falcons' Ricky Peromingan with under six minutes remaining. Fontanilla and Manalang tried to pull the Tigers back in the game with 15–1 rally, bringing the deficit down to 13, at 69–78, but fell short as the game ended with Adamson leading in double-digits.

Fontanilla had a career-high of 23 points, with Cabañero and Manalang chipping in 13 and 11, respectively. Concepcion struggled for the second straight game, going 1-for-13 for a 4-point output. His lone field goal came late in the game, at the 1:44 mark of the third quarter.

NU Bulldogs

| | 1 | 2 | 3 | 4 | Total |
|---|---|---|---|---|---|
| UST | 12 | 12 | 11 | 25 | 60 |
| NU | 17 | 19 | 18 | 19 | 73 |

The Tigers' second-round game against the NU Bulldogs ended in another loss, causing their opponents to end their four-game losing streak. UST, on the other hand, lost their fourth straight game and have been eliminated from Final Four contention, with only two playing days remaining in the elimination rounds. They were trailing by 5 points, at 12–17 at the end of the opening period, but the Bulldogs soon found their rhythm and zoomed to a double-digit lead, at 36–24, going into the halftime break. The Tigers fell behind further in the third period, as the deficit grew from 12 to 22 after back-to-back threes by the Bulldogs' Reyland Torres. NU's onslaught carried over to the final period, blowing the game wide open and further increasing their lead. UST was able to bring NU's 25-point, 63–38 lead down to just 10, at 55–65 with a 17–2 rally, which was capped by Aldave Canoy's layup with under three minutes remaining in the game. NU, however, was quick to douse cold water on them, after Torres again made two consecutive triples to bring the lead back up to 16, at 71–55. In the end, the Tigers found the Bulldogs' 25-point lead too much to overcome. Such was the Bulldogs' firepower that even their bench players outscored UST's, 46–29. The Tigers shot poorly from the charity stripe, going for a measly 13.3 percentage, on 12-of-23 attempts. They were also outrebounded, 44–55.

Cabañero led the Tigers with a double-double of 13 points and 15 rebounds, with Fontanilla and Manalang adding 12 and 11 points, respectively.

UP Fighting Maroons

| | 1 | 2 | 3 | 4 | Total |
|---|---|---|---|---|---|
| UP | 26 | 27 | 20 | 23 | 96 |
| UST | 11 | 22 | 20 | 14 | 67 |

UST suffered yet another blowout loss, this time against eventual Finals contender, the UP Fighting Maroons. The game ended with the Tigers staring at a 29-point deficit, at 67–96. The Maroons employed a tight defense from the start, leaving UST in their trail by 15 points at the end of the first quarter, at 26–11. The Tigers were caught napping as early as the game's tip-off, when UP sprang a 9–0 run on them, as the trend of their opponents' three-point barrage carried into the next two quarters of the match. Down by 20 points, at 33–53 at the end of the half, UST could only manage to get to within 17, at 47–64, late in the third period, after which, former Growling Tiger CJ Cansino spearheaded a 7–0 rally to increase the lead to 24, at 71–47, with over a minute to go in the quarter. The game's largest lead came in the last 2:46 minutes of the final period, when the Tigers found themselves chasing a 33-point, 59–92 deficit. UP's defense forced UST to commit 26 turnovers, as their starters combined for a total of only 18 points, against the Maroons' 46. Veteran forward Miguel Pangilinan topscored for the Tigers with 21 points with 5 three-pointers. Rookie Jordi Gomez de Liaño added 9, all from triples.

| | 1 | 2 | 3 | 4 | Total |
|---|---|---|---|---|---|
| FEU | 22 | 27 | 25 | 35 | 109 |
| UST | 15 | 19 | 13 | 18 | 65 |

FEU Tamaraws

The Tiger's hopes of ending the season on a positive note were dashed after a 44-point, 65–109 crushing defeat against the FEU Tamaraws. Down by seven at the end of the first period, a poor second quarter showing by UST allowed their opponents to pull away with 27 points, as the deficit increased to 15, at 34–49 at the end of the first half. The Tamaraws tightened their defense at the start of the third quarter, allowing them to pull further away from the Tigers, who only managed to score 13 points in the said period.

Cabañero scored 16 points, while Fontanilla, playing in his last game as a Tiger, added 13 points.

"We need to learn from this. I told them, 'let's cherish this losing experience, and then, next season, we will fix all that we did wrong.' Down to the very last person on the bench, everyone needs to put in the work next season, so that we can return to our winning ways. There isn't anyone here who would have wanted to win only three games, we were expecting for something bigger, but this is all that we could come up with, so we really need to work on improving ourselves next season."

— Jino Manansala

After 14 games, the Tigers bowed out at seventh place after winning only one game in the second round for a 3–11 record. The only team that did worse was the last-ranked UE Red Warriors who went winless. The number of losses does not necessarily discredit the team's performance, but the blowout losses were the ones that defined their season. UST's point differential of -238 was the league's worst, more than 30 points of UE's output. The 50-point and 44-point losses were the biggest marginal defeats in the UAAP since record-keeping became digitized in 2003, according to statistician Pong Ducanes. Head coach Jino Manansala attributes the losses to inexperience, and a return trip in the next season can only help his young players to learn and grow together, as only one player is set to depart, with point guard Joshua Fontanilla exhausting his playing eligibility.

"I decided to stay because the support was tremendous. I especially felt it in Season 82 during our run to the championship. They were all there, and until now they have not left us, so for me, I cannot bring myself to leave them. This my way of giving back to the community, that whatever happens, I am not going to leave them."

— Sherwin Concepcion

Contributing to the Tigers' downward spiral was Concepcion, whose stats dipped in the second round. From 13.7 points per game, he ended the season with only 10.6. His 38.7 three-point percentage also went down to 29.7 percent. In just his second season with UST, Concepcion has become a veteran and had been tasked to informally lead and guide the present batch of young players in the team. When the fallout between the players and the coaching staff happened in 2020, Concepcion was in his hometown province in Tarlac, excluded from the training camp. With the lockdown already in effect, he was not given clearance to return to UST and missed joining his team in their travel to Sorsogon. But after all the player transfers, he chose to stay.

"Coach (Aldin) and I have been longtime friends and I look up to him with a great deal of gratitude, so whatever the management decides (on his potential return), I will stay on to support him."

— Jino Manansala

It seems that the noise generated by the Sorsogon training bubble saga in the offseason of the now-cancelled Season 83 has not completely died down. With the Tigers losing by embarrassing blowouts, calls by the UST community for former coach Aldin Ayo's return has made rounds in social media using the hashtag, "#LetAyoCoach." It can be recalled that in the midst of investigations surrounding the training camp by the team that was deemed illegal, the UAAP board handed down a resolution to ban Ayo indefinitely from all UAAP-related activities. Manansala said in an interview that he is leaving the future of his tenure into the hands of the school management. The decorated coach who is responsible for the St. Clare College Saints' multiple basketball championships was recruited by Ayo to be one of his assistant coaches in 2019, leading the Tigers to a runner-up finish that year. He also stated that whether there will be any coaching changes, he is fully committed in developing the skills of his current players, while also being hopeful in recruiting taller players in the offseason to upgrade their undersized personnel.

== Players drafted into the PBA ==
Bryan Santos and Sherwin Concepcion, both ruled ineligible for Season 85, applied for the record 124-strong 2023 PBA draft and were selected in the second and third rounds, respectively. Santos was picked 14th overall by former Growling Tigers head coach Aldin Ayo of the Converge FiberXers team, while Concepcion ended up with the Yeng Guiao-led Rain or Shine Elasto Painters team as the 27th pick of the draft which was held on September 17, 2023.

Dave Ando, meanwhile, decided to forgo his remaining years of eligibility with UST at the end of Season 84. It was announced that he had reunited with Coach Ayo in the Chooks-to-Go 3x3 basketball team that competed in the FIBA professional circuit in July. He has since played for the San Juan Knights and the Ilagan Isabela Cowboys in the Maharlika Pilipinas Basketball League before deciding to apply for the 2025 PBA draft. He was selected 14th overall in the second round by newly-installed head coach Willy Wilson of the Phoenix Fuel Masters on September 7, 2025.

| Year | Player | Round | Pick | Overall | PBA team |
|---|---|---|---|---|---|
| 2023 | Bryan Santos | 2 | 2 | 14 | Converge FiberXers |
| 2023 | Sherwin Concepcion | 3 | 3 | 27 | Rain or Shine Elasto Painters |
| 2025 | Dave Ando | 2 | 2 | 14 | Phoenix Fuel Masters |
