= Gabriel Taborin College of Davao =

Private school in Davao del Sur, Philippines

Coordinates: 7°3′52″N 125°36′28″E

- Other names: Gabriel Taborin College of Davao Foundation, Inc.
- Former names: Gabriel Taborin Technical School
- Type: Private, Catholic, Technical school
- Established: June 18, 2001
- Founders: Brothers of the Holy Family
- Religious affiliation: Roman Catholic
- President: Bro. Delio Da Campo, FSF
- Location: Purok Sagittarius, Lasang, Bunawan, Davao City, Philippines

Gabriel Taborin College of Davao (GTCD; officially Gabriel Taborin College of Davao Foundation, Inc.; formerly Gabriel Taborin Technical School Foundation, Inc.) is a technical school in Davao City, Philippines, founded by the Congregation of Brothers of the Holy Family of Belley.

== History ==
In the year 2000, the Brothers of the Holy Family of Belley selected Lasang, Davao as a prospective new community destination for their Philippine mission. Four brothers, Davide Del Barba, Andrés Galindo, and two Vietnamese brothers were the ones to arrive on Lasang and start their first religious community in the Philippines.

In the following year, the brothers started the Gabriel Taborin Technical School.

== See also ==
- Gabriel Taborin
- List of colleges and universities in Davao City
