= List of international schools in the Philippines =

The following is a list of international K–12 schools located in provincial cities of the Philippines, sorted by region, that both have international curricula and international pre-tertiary-education accreditation. There are numerous schools in the Philippines that have the word "International" in their names as a marketing ploy and not true international schools.

True international schools are few since they had to be established by legislation or presidential decrees.

== Luzon provincial cities ==
=== By accreditation ===
==== Cambridge Assessment International Education ====
- Casa Kalayaan International School (Subic Bay Freeport Zone)
- Fountain International School (Metro Manila)
- Singapore School Clark (Clark Freeport Zone)
- Westfields International School (Angeles)

==== Advanced Placement Program ====
- Noblesse International School (Angeles)
- Saint Paul American School - Clark (Clark Freeport Zone)

==== International Baccalaureate ====
- The Beacon Academy (Biñan)
- Brent International School – Presidential Decree No. 2022, s. 1986 (Biñan)
- Learning Links Academy (Santa Rosa, Laguna; Silang, Cavite)
- Noblesse International School (Angeles)
- Our Lady of Victories Catholic School

==== International Schools Association ====
- Brentwood College of Asia International School (Naga, Camarines Sur)
- Gentry International School (Clark Freeport Zone)
- Kids International Learning Academy (Cainta)
- Westfields International School (Angeles)

==== Western Association of Schools and Colleges ====
- Brentwood College of Asia International School (Naga, Camarines Sur)
- Brent International School – Presidential Decree No. 2022, s. 1986 (Biñan)
- Stonyhurst Southville International School - Malarayat (Lipa City Campus)
- Stonyhurst Southville International School - Batangas City – Republic Act No. 9493

==== Adventist Accrediting Association ====
- Adventist International Institute of Advanced Studies (AIIAS) – Academy – Presidential Decree No. 2021, s. 1986 (Silang, Cavite)

== Visayas provincial cities ==
=== By accreditation ===
==== Cambridge Assessment International Education ====
- Global Leaders International School, Cebu City and Mactan Campus (Cebu City & Mactan)
- Centre for International Education - CIE British School (Cebu & Tacloban)
- Singapore School Cebu (Mandaue)
- Woodridge International School (Mandaue)

==== Council of British International Schools ====
- ONE International School Philippines (Dauin)

==== International Baccalaureate ====
- Cebu International School – Republic Act No. 9190
- Singapore School Cebu (Mandaue)

== Mindanao provincial cities ==
- Joji Ilagan International Schools - Stockbridge American International School (Davao City & General Santos City)
- Philippine Nikkei Jin Kai International School (Davao City)
- Precious International School of Davao (Davao City)
