= 2020 UST Growling Tigers basketball team =

2020 UST Growling Tigers men's basketball
- Head coach: Jino Manansala (Interim season)
- Assistant coaches: McJour Luib; Joph Cleopas
- Captain: Vacant

The 2020 UST Growling Tigers men's basketball team was scheduled to represent the University of Santo Tomas in the 83rd season of the University Athletic Association of the Philippines, but then the COVID-19 pandemic struck and it affected all sporting events worldwide. The rest of the UAAP tournaments in the second semester of Season 82 were discontinued and eventually terminated in April 2020. A belated opening of Season 83 was planned for January 2021, but the UAAP board eventually decided on cancelling the entire season amid the continued community quarantine measures that would affect the athletes' training and social gathering in general. This was the first time since World War II that an entire season is cancelled by the league.

The Tigers were participating in the 2020 PBA D-League Aspirants' Cup as part of their preseason training and had already played two games before its indefinite suspension on March 11. The league formally announced the cancellation of the tournament in September.

== Preseason roster ==
There were three graduating players from the 2019 UST Growling Tigers roster. Point guard Renzo Subido was drafted into the PBA in December 2019, while center Enrique Caunan who saw limited minutes in the concluded UAAP season had been left out. Only Zach Huang remained in the 15-man lineup that competed in the PBA D-League tournament.

Three other Season 82 mainstays, Miguel Pangilinan, Albert Bordeos, and Nat Cosejo were excluded from the preseason roster. Taking over their spots were Team B members Paul Manalang, Ian Herrera, and Christian Manaytay. A fourth player, Jorden Santos came all the way from Virginia.

UST Growling Tigers roster
Players
Coaches

Pos.	No.	Nat.	Name	Height	Year	High School
PF	0	(Philippines)	Ira Spencer Bataller	6'4" (1.93m)	2nd	Arellano University High School
SF	3	(Philippines)	Brent Isaac Paraiso	6'2" (1.88m)	3rd	De La Salle Santiago Zobel School
PF	4	(Philippines)	Christian Manaytay	6'4" (1.93m)	Redshirt	Sacred Heart School-Ateneo de Cebu
PG	6	(Philippines)	Mark Nonoy	5'8" (1.73m)	1st	University of Santo Tomas
SG	7	(United States)	Jorden Santos	6'0" (1.83m)	Redshirt	Green Run High School
PF	8	(Philippines)	Sherwin Concepcion	6'3" (1.91m)	1st	Malayan High School of Science
SG	10	(Philippines)	Rhenz Joseph Abando	6'2" (1.88m)	3rd	Bactad East National High School
C	12	(Philippines)	Ian Joseph Herrera	6'6" (1.98m)	Redshirt	La Salle Greenhills
SF	13	(Philippines)	Zachary Lance Eden Huang	6'4" (1.93m)	5th	Sacred Heart School–Ateneo de Cebu
C	14	(Philippines)	Arnold Dave Ando	6'7" (2.01m)	2nd	University of San Jose–Recoletos
PG	16	(Philippines)	Paul Matthew Manalang	5'10" (1.78m)	Redshirt	Nazareth School of National University
SF	19	(Philippines)	Ferdinand Asuncion, Jr.	6'2" (1.88m)	1st	Chiang Kai Shek College
C	23	(Benin)	Soulémane Chabi Yo	6'6" (1.98m)	2nd	Université d'Abomey-Calavi
SF	27	(Philippines)	Crispin John Cansino (C)	6'2" (1.88m)	2nd	University of Santo Tomas
SG	30	(Philippines)	Vince Petdeo Cuajao	6'1" (1.85m)	1st	Holy Child College of Davao

Head coach

- (Philippines) Aldin Ayo

Assistant coach(es)

- Jino Manansala
- McJour Luib
- Jason Misolas
- Rodolfo Carlos, Jr.

Team manager

- Jad Racal

Legend

- (C) Team captain
- Injured

- Roster

=== Depth chart ===
Pos.	Starting 5	Bench 1	Bench 2
C	Chabi Yo	Ando	Herrera
PF	Bataller	Manaytay	Concepcion
SF	Cansino	Huang	Asuncion
SG	Abando	Cuajao	Paraiso
PG	Nonoy	Manalang	Santos

== Schedule and results ==
The PBA D-League games were aired on 5 Plus and ESPN 5.

Preseason game log

2020 PBA D-League Aspirants' Cup: 2–0
Game	Date • Time	Opponent	Result	Record	High points	High rebounds	High assists	Location
1	Mar 5 • 3:00 pm	TIP Engineers	W 115–62	1–0	Cuajao (24)	Tied (8)	Tied (6)	Ynares Sports Arena, Pasig
2	Mar 9 • 1:00 pm	Diliman College Blue Dragons	W 106–93	2–0	Chabi Yo (24)	Ando (11)	Nonoy (5)	Paco Arena; Manila
3	Mar 16 • 3:00 pm	Mapúa Cardinals	Cancelled					Paco Arena; Manila
4	Mar 19 • 1:00 pm	Enderun Titans	Cancelled					Ynares Sports Arena, Pasig
5	Mar 30 • 3:00 pm	AMA University Titans	Cancelled					Paco Arena; Manila
6	Apr 13	Marinerong Pilipino Skippers	Cancelled					Paco Arena; Manila
7	Apr 16	San Sebastian Stags	Cancelled					Ynares Sports Arena, Pasig
8	Apr 30	FEU Tamaraws	Cancelled					Ynares Sports Arena, Pasig
9	May 5	De La Salle Green Archers	Cancelled					Ynares Sports Arena, Pasig
10	May 7	CEU Scorpions	Cancelled					Ynares Sports Arena, Pasig
11	May 11	Letran Knights	Cancelled					Paco Arena; Manila

(#) Tournament seedings in parentheses.
All times are in UTC+08:00.

=== Summary ===
The D-League Aspirants' Cup tournament was set to begin on February 13, 2020, but the organizers decided on pushing it back to March 2 following safety protocols imposed by the government in the midst of the COVID-19 outbreak.

Coming off a runner-up finish in the just-concluded UAAP basketball tournament, the Growling Tigers had aimed to build on that momentum with a strong showing in the said tournament. They defeated their opponents by an average margin of 33 points before the league went on another break due to rising cases of COVID-19 infections.

	1	2	3	4	Total
UST	30	24	26	35	115
TIP	16	15	20	11	62

TIP Engineers

UST had a 53-point blowout in their 115–62 win over the Technological Institute of the Philippines. Their 23 three-point shot conversions surpassed their record of 16 in the UAAP. Deo Cuajao contributed 7 of those threes to topscore for the team with 24 points. Junjun Asuncion continued the attack in the fourth quarter by shooting 5 more threes to finish the game with 20 points. The Tigers opened the game on a 20–5 run which ended on a 30–16 first quarter score. Their lead had ballooned to 29 points at the end of the third quarter.

	1	2	3	4	Total
UST	37	21	34	14	106
Diliman	18	24	22	29	93

Diliman College Blue Dragons

The Growling Tigers had another quick start in their game against Diliman College by racing to a 16–5 lead. They had poured on the points to end the first quarter with a score of 37–18. UST went on to lead the Blue Dragons by at least 30 points numerous times in the game before their starters were called back to the bench. They were outscored, 14–29 in the fourth quarter as Diliman managed to narrow down the lead to only 13 points at the end of the game. Soulémane Chabi Yo topscored for 24 points and was aided by Dave Ando's double-double of 14 points and 11 rebounds.

With Coach Aldin Ayo stressing the need for the players to familiarize themselves with his coaching system, the Growling Tigers displayed their three-point shooting efficiency in different scenarios. In their game against TIP, the team went on a high 50 field goal percentage when they made 23 of their 46 three-point shot attempts.

In their two games, they averaged a 57-percent accuracy on spot-up threes, 52 percent of which were from contested shots and an even higher 62 percent on uncontested attempts. The players also converted a respectable 37 percent of three-point attempts when moving from picks or evading a defender. In more difficult cases of Pull-up jumpers from beyond the arc, they had been successful twice in their eight attempts for a 25-percent clip.

== Sorsogon bubble ==
CJ Cansino's departure from the team signified the start of the Growling Tigers' saga in 2020 as allegations of multiple violations of quarantine protocols and insufficient living, dietary and health conditions caused player transfers, suspension and resignation of the team's top officials, and eventually the involvement of government bodies to step in and join the investigations on the said allegations.

=== Sequence of events ===
August 20

On August 20, 2020, The Varsitarian through their official Twitter account broke the news of Cansino's departure from the Growling Tigers' roster. In the tweet, the school's student publication had mentioned that both the player and management had reached an agreement to "part ways."

August 21

Cansino in an interview disputed The Varsitarian's report on the two parties' agreement, claiming that he was removed even though he did not want to leave. An ABS-CBN Sports article reported that Cansino's removal was due to his "defiance of authority," where sources close to the team elaborated on how he approached the coaching staff on behalf of the team to relay their desire to go back to their respective homes. The cause of his removal was not clarified in the article, but it added that he was initially removed as team captain before the eviction from the roster.

UP Fighting Maroons coach Bo Perasol later announced that Cansino has committed to their team. Throughout the events that were unfolding, social media went abuzz on speculations of the existence of a "Bicol Bubble," a term coined by sports writers in reference to the NBA Bubble, when the American league resumed their 2019–20 season by bringing together the players, coaches and personnel of the teams in one single place. Members of the Growling Tigers were allegedly quartered to conduct training activities. Sorsogon, located in the Bicol region is the home province of Aldin Ayo.

August 22

The media spectacle began reaching the attention of government agencies with the Games and Amusements Board announcing that they will begin investigating the incident over possible quarantine violations. A video surfaced around social media outlets showing members of the team conducting shooting practices. A number of commenters pointed out that the location was in Capuy, Sorsogon and that the team had been staying there since the middle of June.

August 23

The Philippine Star's Abac Cordero posted on his Twitter account a photographed document, appearing to be a copy of a waiver by the players' parent or guardian that allows them their participation in the bubble. The document was addressed to the school's athletic director, Fr. Jannel Abogado.

Coach Aldin Ayo finally issued a statement on the issue, saying "marked differences" between him and Cansino had caused the player's exit. The statement added that Ayo had chosen to refrain from making additional comments as the school had already begun their own investigation, though he was giving his assurance to fully cooperate with the inquiries by UST and the government agencies.

August 25

The Varsitarian reported Abogado's resignation just before a scheduled meeting of school officials with the government's Inter-Agency Task Force that would discuss the team's alleged quarantine guideline violations. He was replaced by former director of UST's Institute of Physical Eduacation and Athletics, Fr. Ermito de Sagon who was set to sit on an interim capacity.

August 26

UST has ordered a stoppage of the team's training in Sorsogon. Ayo gathered the players to inform them of the school's directive to send them home, pending the completion of travel documents and other government clearance requirements.

In a now-deleted social media post, Cansino shared six screenshot images from a Facebook group chat among the players and their parents regarding complaints about their living conditions in Sorsogon. In the thread, Cansino had relayed that the food being served to them was not to his preference, adding some of his teammates have resorted to ordering fast food instead. Soulémane Chabi Yo complained of experiencing homesickness and poor mobile phone signal, while Rhenz Abando said that no one from the staff was tending to the players who have become sick during their stay there.

August 27

The Commission on Higher Education has joined the investigation and announced that it was looking into UST officials' involvement and accountability in the team's "bubble" training. The CHED was tapped to join the tripartite of the Philippine Sports Commission, the GAB, and the Department of Health under the Joint Administrative Order, as the said JAO only covers professional sports teams.

August 31

The UAAP board presented UST's investigation result and recommendations to the JAO and CHED. They were looking into which government agency had the authority to mete out sanctions on the school for their violation of the government's health protocols. The JAO earlier gave UST their permission to conduct their own investigation on the team's training bubble. UST submitted their internal report to the board on August 28.

September 4

Aldin Ayo has stepped down from his position as head coach of the Growling Tigers' senior men's basketball team. In his resignation letter, he extended his apologies to the people affected by condemnations thrown at the team as a result of the "Bubble" issue and reiterated his commitment to taking responsibility and willingness to face appropriate sanctions.

September 5

UST formally accepted Ayo's resignation, as well as those of his two assistant coaches, McJour Luib and Jino Manansala. While thanking the three coaches, an official statement read that the basketball program was moving forward to a rebuilding phase without a head coach.

September 9

The UAAP board has handed down an indefinite ban on Aldin Ayo. The league came up with the conclusion that the resigned coach has endangered the "health and well-being" of his players by holding a training camp, which was a violation of the government's health protocols amid the pandemic. The league's Board of Managing Directors recommended the sanction and was ratified by the Board of Trustees, which are composed of the UAAP's eight member school presidents. The ban prohibits Ayo from participating in any capacity, in all UAAP events and UAAP-sanctioned activities.

September 14

Jimi Lim's Ironcon Builders withdrew their sponsorship of the Growling Tigers' basketball program. The consortium came onboard before the start of the 2019 UAAP season to take over Chuck Dumlao's FMR Corporation and to mainly give support to Aldin Ayo. With this new partnership, the team was able to recruit blue chips from the high school ranks, boosting not only the senior men's team, but also their junior counterpart, the UST Tiger Cubs basketball program. With Ayo's resignation, Ironcon decided to also leave.

September 19

Mark Nonoy and Deo Cuajao, in an interview disputed claims made by Cansino on what transpired in their training camp in Sorsogon. Nonoy clarified that the players did not hold any scrimmages as they trained separately in different batches and in different facilities within Ayo's property. Regarding their sleeping arrangements, Cuajao said that three players were staying in one room. He did not address the issue about the group chat complaints, adding the players involved came to Sorsogon a month before he and Nonoy arrived. On Cansino's narration about their movements being restricted within the "bubble," the two denied it by saying that anyone in the team was able to leave and come back freely at any time.

September 30

The Sorsogon Philippine National Police found no violation committed by Ayo with regards to the IATF quarantine guidelines. A memorandum submitted by the police agency to Sorsogon Governor Chiz Escudero has cleared the former Growling Tigers coach from any liabilities in the COVID-19 safety precautions. They also concluded that no school-sanctioned basketball training occurred within Ayo's property during the team's stay from June until August and certified the team's compliance in securing documents, travel passes, tests and the mandatory quarantine period upon their arrival in Sorsogon.

October 7

UST sent a letter to the UAAP endorsing Ayo's appeal for reconsideration on his indefinite ban.

October 13

The UAAP released a statement acknowledging UST's letter of endorsement of their former coach's appeal on his sanction. In their reply, the statement read that the said appeal will be tackled by the association in "due time." Reports bared that among the contents of UST's letter was a statement that they do not accept the findings of the Sorsogon PNP which absolved Ayo of any IATF violations and insisted on the correctness of the report that they earlier submitted prior to the meeting with JAO.

November 23

Aldin Ayo's appeal as well as UST's endorsement to lessen the former coach's sanction remained in limbo. When asked about the status of the case, UAAP executive director Rebo Saguisag replied that the board has yet to set a date for discussing the matter while awaiting investigations by the CHED and the Department of Justice.

The CHED has completed their fact-finding report in October and has turned it over to the DOJ, who they claimed has the jurisdiction with regards to the IATF rules that the team may have violated. CHED Chairman Popoy de Vera opined that from reading UST's internal report, there was clearly some training done in Sorsogon involving UST's basketball players.

The DOJ earlier said in a statement that they were evaluating whether or not the department had jurisdiction over the report submitted to them by the CHED. A DOJ official who was interviewed on the condition of anonymity gave his opinion on how the investigation was more of administrative, rather than criminal in nature and had doubted that the department would have jurisdiction over it. The official was short in ruling out any criminal liability due to the Sorsogon PNP clearing the parties involved in the bubble.

DOJ Secretary Menardo Guevarra said in an interview in November that the department has not started an investigation as they were yet to receive a formal complaint against Ayo or UST. It was also revealed that the DOJ has returned the report to CHED over jurisdiction issues.

December 11

The UAAP announced the cancellation of Season 83 due to lingering COVID cases that kept students out of schools and forced them to remain into quarantines. The decision was made after a series of meetings by the league's Board of Trustees, putting to priority the health and safety of the student-athletes. The league earlier ruled against the regular opening of games in the first semester of the school year in September, but had considered a January start with all games to be played in the second semester.

== Exodus of players ==
In the midst of investigations into the Sorsogon bubble controversy and the high probability of a suspension from the UAAP, the Growling Tigers saw the departure of seven of their Season 82 players.

=== Departures ===
Pos.	#	Player	Height	Year	High school	Notes
PF	0	Ira Spencer Bataller	6' 4"	2nd	Arellano University High School	Transferred to Colegio de San Juan de Letran
SF	3	Brent Isaac Paraiso	6' 2"	3rd	De La Salle Santiago Zobel School	Transferred to Colegio de San Juan de Letran
PG	5	Henri Lorenzo Subido	5' 9"	5th	De La Salle Santiago Zobel School	Graduated
PG	6	Mark Nonoy	5' 8"	1st	University of Santo Tomas	Transferred to De La Salle University
SG	10	Rhenz Joseph Abando	6' 2"	3rd	Bactad East National High School	Transferred to Colegio de San Juan de Letran
C	11	Enrique Caunan, Jr.	6' 5"	5th	Colegio de San Juan de Letran	Graduated
SF	13	Zachary Lance Eden Huang	6' 4"	5th	Sacred Heart School-Ateneo de Cebu	Graduated
PF	16	Nathaniel Cosejo	6' 3"	2nd	De La Salle Santiago Zobel School	Out of the team since February
SF	19	Ferdinand Asuncion, Jr.	6' 2"	1st	Chiang Kai-shek College	Transferred to Mapúa University
SG	21	Alberto Bordeos, Jr.	6' 0"	1st	La Salle Greenhills	Out of the team since February
SG	27	Crispin John Cansino	6' 2"	2nd	University of Santo Tomas	Transferred to the University of the Philippines
SG	30	Vince Petdeo Cuajao	6' 1"	1st	Holy Child College of Davao	Transferred to De La Salle University

=== Holdovers ===
Pos.	#	POB	Player	Height	Year	High school
PF	8	(Philippines)	Sherwin Concepcion	6' 3"	1st	Malayan High School of Science
C	14	(Philippines)	Arnold Dave Ando	6' 7"	2nd	University of San Jose–Recoletos
SG	17	(Philippines)	Miguel Pangilinan	6' 0"	1st	Nazareth School of National University
C	23	(Benin)	Soulémane Chabi Yo	6' 6"	2nd	Université d'Abomey-Calavi

=== Timeline of transfers ===
August 21

CJ Cansino was able to transfer to UP in less than twenty-four hours after news of his expulsion from the Growling Tigers' roster went around social and sports media.

August 29

Brent Paraiso announced his departure from the team shortly after being back in Manila from Sorsogon. Paraiso reportedly dropped all his subjects in the first semester of the 2020–21 school year. His transfer to Letran was finalized on September 4.

August 30

According to sources, Rhenz Abando and Ira Bataller moved out of their dormitory in UST the day after arriving from Sorsogon. They both went on to transfer to Letran with Paraiso.

September 1

Junjun Asuncion became the fifth Tiger to leave the team. The Varsitarian reported that the second-year forward had transferred to Mapua.

September 15

Mark Nonoy and Deo Cuajao finalized their move to La Salle after two days of waiting for UST's endorsement of Aldin Ayo's appeal to the UAAP on his indefinite ban. According to player agent Jax Chua, the two wanted to play for Ayo, but had to make a decision before the deadline of enrollment for the first semester.

September 21

Incoming rookie and former Tiger Cubs main man Bismarck Lina made his transfer to UP to reunite with former high school teammate CJ Cansino. The Batang Gilas mainstay had originally committed to the senior men's team of UST in February, but decided to leave due to the Sorsogon Bubble controversy.

Name	Pos.	Height	High school	Hometown	Commit date
John Bismarck Lina	C	6' 5"	University of Santo Tomas	Makati	27 Feb 2020
John Bismarck Lina	2020 NBTC rank: #6; 2019 NBTC rank: #19				
Sources: 12

== Rebuilding the team ==
Former UST High School principal Fr. Rodel Cansancio was appointed Institute of Physical Education and Athletics (IPEA) director on September 23 to take over the comebacking Fr. Ermito de Sagon, who had in turn assumed the position as interim director after Fr. Jannel Abogado's resignation at the height of the Sorsogon Bubble investigations. Fr. Cansancio has been tasked to lead the depleted basketball team in its rebuilding process, the first task of which is the selection of the next head coach after the now-resigned Aldin Ayo.

Resigned assistant coach and former Growling Tiger Jino Manansala was called back and was appointed interim head coach on October 8. He was chosen among a list of nine applicants that included fellow former Tigers Ed Cordero, Ernesto Ballesteros, Gilbert Lao, and Aries Dimaunahan, as well as Philippine Basketball Association legendary import Sean Chambers. In an interview, Manansala had said that his appointment was due to the school's wish for the continuity of Ayo's brand of "mayhem" basketball. The new coach further emphasized that they are rebuilding but not restructuring the basketball program.
