= PISD =

PISD may refer to:

== School districts ==
- Palacios Independent School District
- Pasadena Independent School District
- Pearland Independent School District
- Pflugerville Independent School District
- Plano Independent School District
- Prosper Independent School District

== Other uses ==
- Phosphatidylserine decarboxylase, encoded by the PISD gene
- Precious International School of Davao, Philippines
