= List of colleges and universities in Davao City =

This is a list of tertiary schools in Davao City, Philippines.

== Universities ==
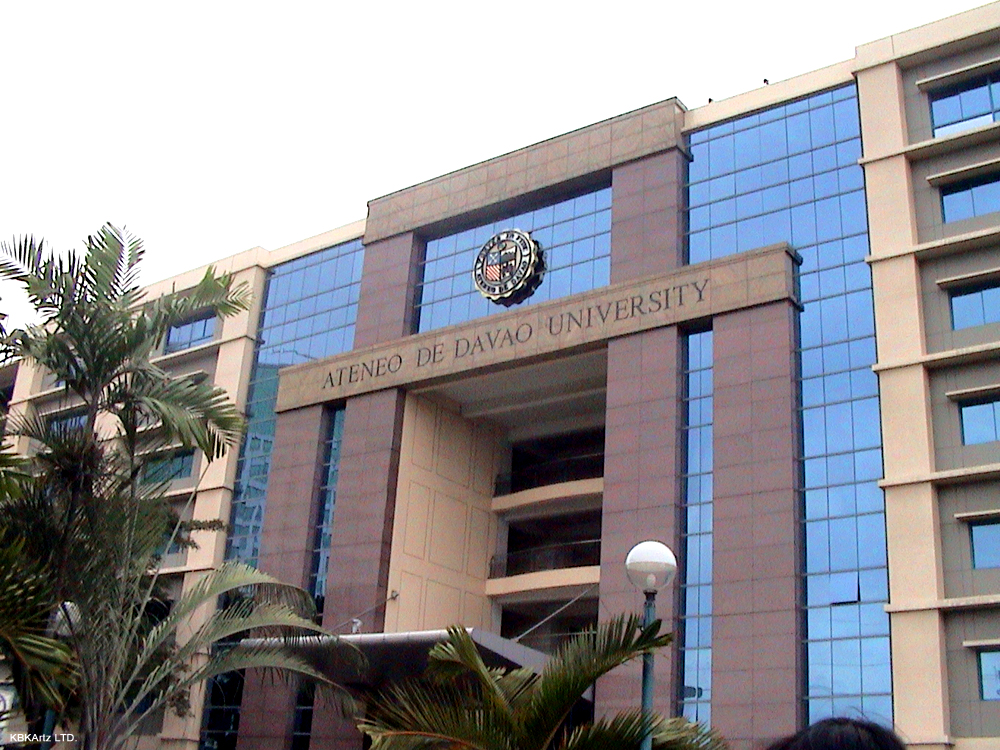
Ateneo de Davao University

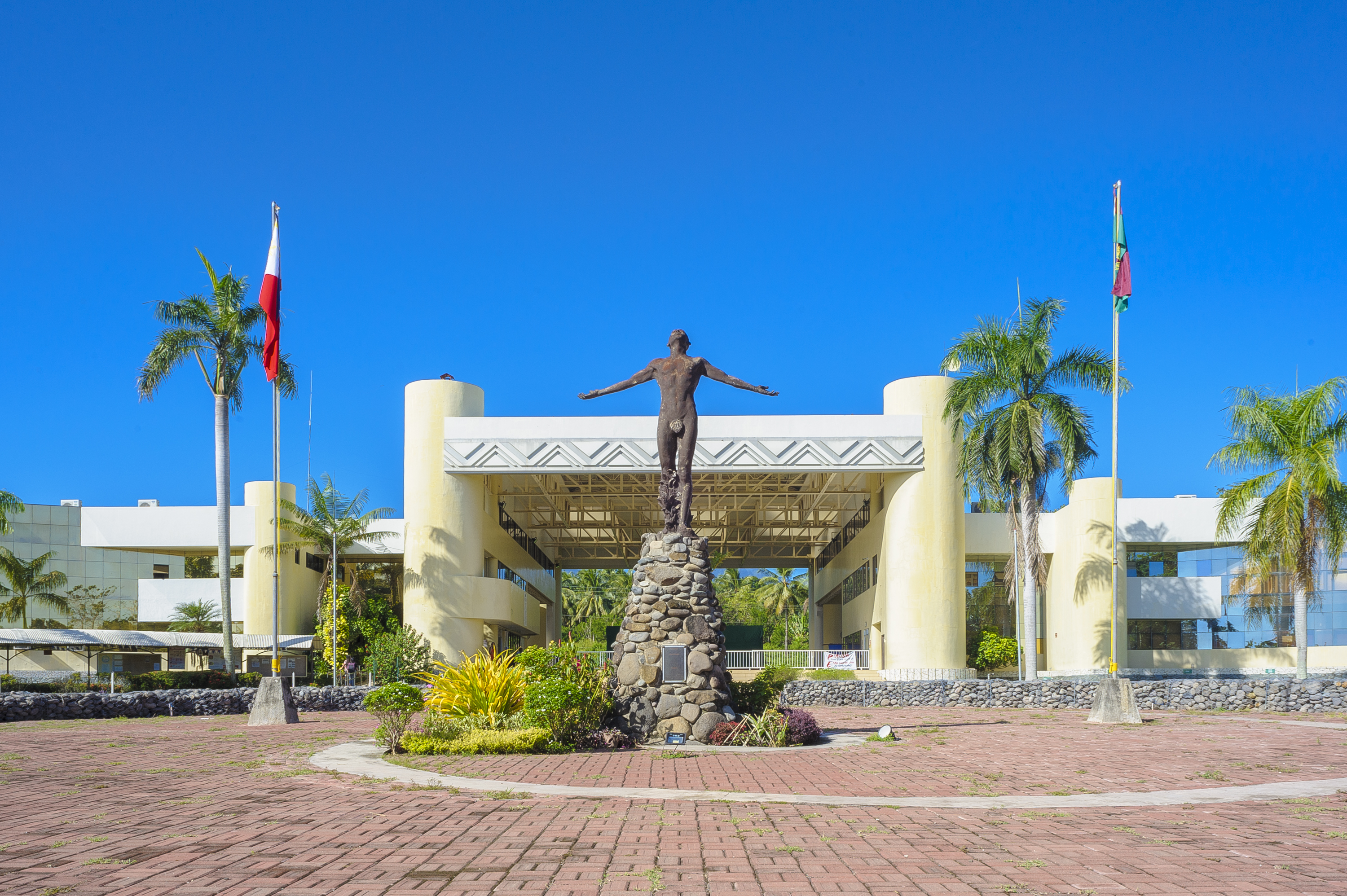
University of the Philippines Mindanao

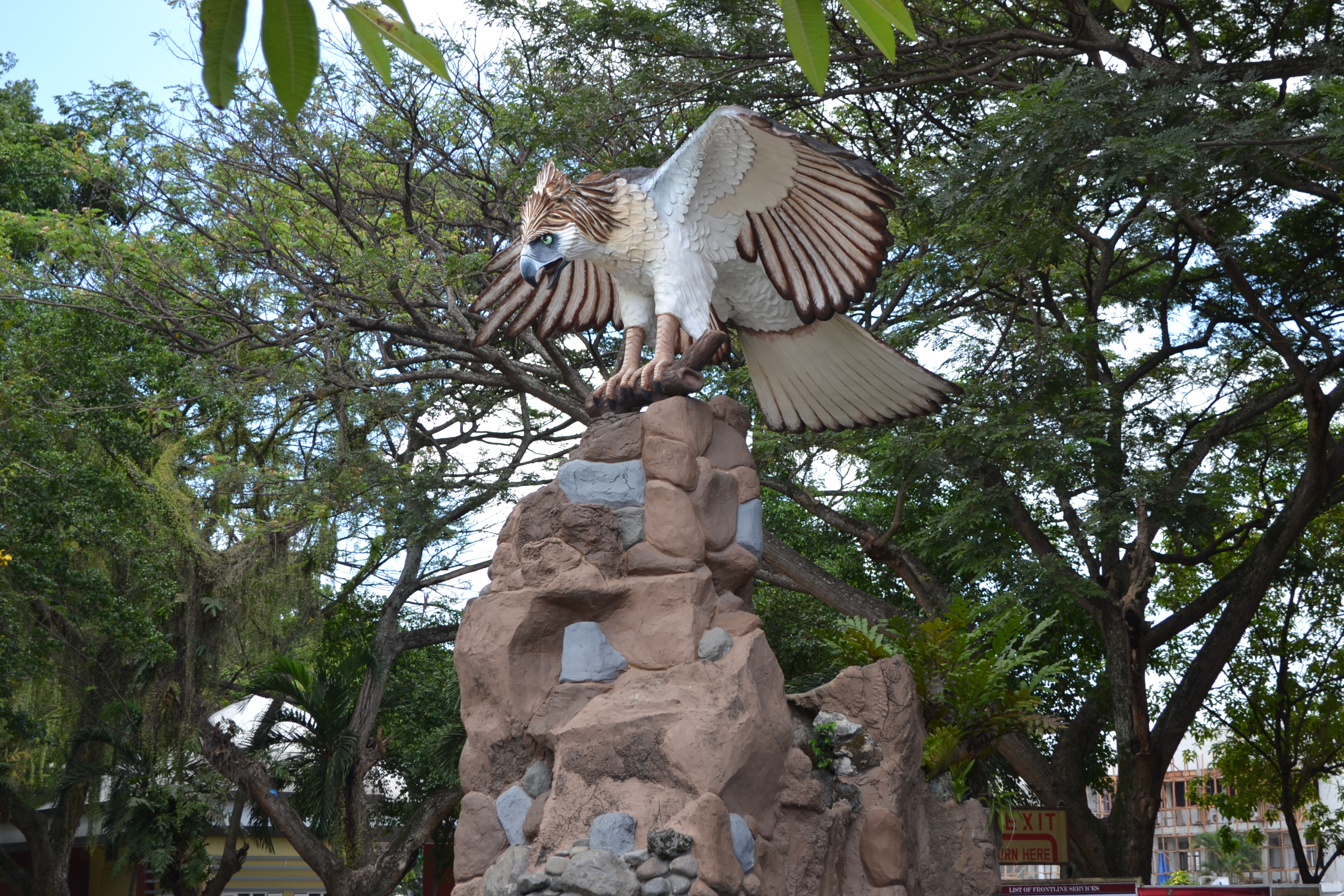
University of Southeastern Philippines - Davao City

=== A ===
- Ateneo de Davao University, the Jesuit university in the Davao region

=== L ===
- Lyceum of the Philippines – Davao, the first LPU campus outside Luzon

=== U ===
- University of Mindanao - Davao region's oldest and the first private, non-sectarian university in Mindanao
- University of the Immaculate Conception - the oldest Catholic school in Mindanao, founded in 1905 by the Congregation of the Religious of the Virgin Mary
- University of Southeastern Philippines - the first state university in the Davao Region
- University of the Philippines Mindanao - the country's national university and premier institution of higher learning, serving as the U.P. System's flag-bearer in Mindanao

== International and Science Schools ==
- Joji Ilagan International Schools
- International Management School
- Precious International School of Davao
- Philippine Nikkei-Jin Kai International School
- Stockbridge American International School
- St. Patrick Math-Sci School

== Colleges ==
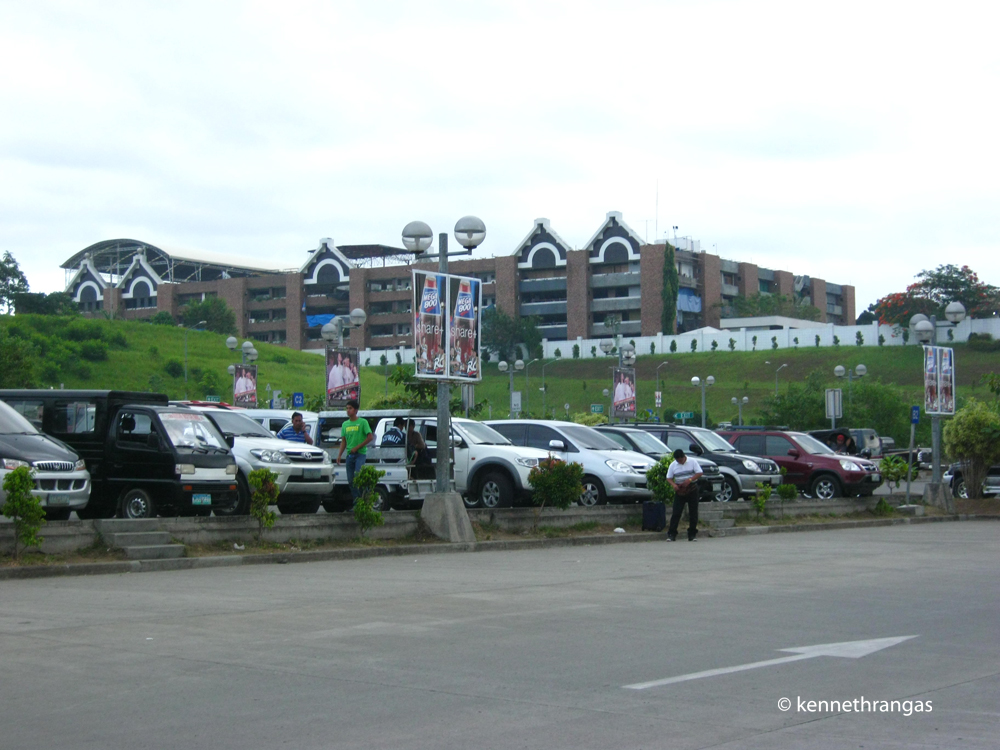
Jose Maria College

=== A ===
- Agro-Industrial Foundation College of The Philippines
- AMA College of Davao
- AMYA Polytechnic College, Inc.
- Assumption College of Davao
- Assumption Polytechnic College of Southern Mindanao

=== B ===
- Brokenshire College of Davao

=== C ===
- Christian Colleges of Southeast Asia
- Colegio de San Ignacio
- City College of Davao

=== D ===
- Davao Central College
- Davao Doctors' College
- Davao Medical School Foundation
- Davao Vision Colleges
- DMMA College of Southern Philippines

=== G ===
- Gabriel Taborin College of Davao

=== H ===
- Holy Child College of Davao
- Holy Cross of Davao College
- Holy Cross College of Calinan
- Holy Cross College of Sasa

=== J ===
- Jose Maria College Foundation

=== M ===
- Mapúa Malayan Colleges Mindanao
- MATS College of Technology
- Mindanao Medical Foundation College
- Mindanao International College

=== P ===
- Philippine College of Technology
- Philippine Women's College of Davao

=== R ===
- Rizal Memorial College

=== S ===
- Samson Polytechnic College of Davao
- Joseph Technical Academy of Davao City
- San Lorenzo College of Davao
- San Pedro College
- St. John Paul II College of Davao
- St. Paul College (Davao Campus)
- St. Peter's College of Toril
- STI College of Davao

=== T ===
- Tecarro College Foundation

== Future colleges and universities ==
- A campus of De La Salle University will open in Davao Global Township in Davao City on an undetermined date.
