= 2017 Letran Knights basketball team =

Philippine Basketball team season

2017 Letran Knights men's basketball

Record
- Elims rank: #5
- Final rank: #5
- 2017 record: 9–9
- Head coach: Jeff Napa (2nd season)
- Assistant coaches: Leo Pujante; Jay Agleron; Chico Manabat; Robert Joseph Guevarra; Kerby Raymundo
- Captain: Rey Nambatac (5th season)

The 2017 Letran Knights men's basketball team represented Colegio de San Juan de Letran in the 93rd season of the National Collegiate Athletic Association in the Philippines. The men's basketball tournament for the school year 2017-18 began on July 8, 2017, and the host school for the season was San Sebastian College–Recoletos.

The Knights finished the double round-robin eliminations tied with the Arellano Chiefs and San Sebastian Stags at fourth to sixth-place finish with 9 wins against 9 losses. The Knights underwent a series of classification matches to determine the fourth-seeded team. The Knights then defeated the Chiefs, but faltered against the Stags. The Knights then missed the Final Four playoffs for two consecutive seasons.

== Roster ==
Letran Knights roster
Players
Coaches

| Pos. | No. | Nat. | Name | Height | Year | High School |
|---|---|---|---|---|---|---|
| C | 5 | (Philippines) | Pamulaklakin, Christian Paul M. | 6'6" (1.98m) | 1st | – |
| G | 6 | (Philippines) | Nambatac, Rey Benedict C. (C) | 5'11" (1.8m) | 5th | Colegio de San Juan de Letran |
| G | 7 | (Philippines) | Balanza, Jerrick G. | 6'2" (1.88m) | 3rd | Colegio de San Juan de Letran |
| G | 8 | (Philippines) | Calvo, John Paul | 6'0" (1.83m) | 4th | Hua Siong College of Iloilo |
| G | 11 | (Philippines) | Bernabe, Maui Matthew | 5'9" (1.75m) | 3rd | University of the East |
| G | 12 | (Philippines) | Taladua, Jeremiah | 5'10" (1.78m) | 3rd | – |
| G | 13 | (Philippines) | Gedaria, Tommy York | 5'9" (1.75m) | 2nd | Colegio de San Juan de Letran |
| C | 14 | (Philippines) | Pascual, Daryl Louie | 6'6" (1.98m) | 1st | Arellano University |
| C | 15 | (Philippines) | Balagasay, Christian | 6'5" (1.96m) | 3rd | Northridge Montessori School |
| C | 17 | (Hong Kong) | De Villa, Joshua Nicholas P. | 6'6" (1.98m) | 1st | YMCA of Hong Kong Christian College |
| F | 18 | (Philippines) | Ambohot, Jeo | 6'5" (1.96m) | 2nd | Agro Industrial Foundation College of the Philippines |
| G | 19 | (Philippines) | Quinto, Kier John | 6'0" (1.83m) | 4th | Colegio de San Juan de Letran |
| C | 20 | (Philippines) | Vacaro, Lance Juviel | 6'5" (1.96m) | 1st | St. Benedict College of Cotabato |
| F | 24 | (Philippines) | Mandreza, Alexander S. | 6'4" (1.93m) | 1st | Del Monte National High School |
| F | 27 | (Philippines) | Caralipio, King Deniell | 6'3" (1.91m) | 2nd | San Pedro High School |
| G | Reserve | (Philippines) | Pambid, Gay Lord Jap | 6'1" (1.85m) | – | – |
| G | Reserve | (Philippines) | Villanueva, Jerick | – | – | Bani National High School |

Head coach

- Jeff Napa

Assistant coach(es)

- Leo Pujante
- Jay Agleron
- Chico Manabat
- Robert Joseph Guevarra
- Kerby Raymundo

Team manager

- Waiyip Chong
- Bonnie Tan

Legend

- (C) Team captain
- Injured

=== Depth chart ===
| Pos. | Starting 5 | Bench 1 | Bench 2 |
|---|---|---|---|
| C | Balagasay | Mandreza | Pascual |
| PF | Ambohot | Caralipio | De Villa |
| SF | Quinto | Taladua | Pamulaklakin |
| SG | Nambatac | Balanza | Vacaro |
| PG | Calvo | Gedaria | Bernabe |

== Roster changes ==
Most of the key players from Season 91 championship team have left the team, namely Jom Sollano, McJour Luib, and Felix Apreku. Holdovers were Rey Nambatac, Bong Quinto, Jerrick Balanza, and JP Calvo. Added to the roster was Jeremiah Taladua, transferee from Lyceum of the Philippines University. Taladuah played in the NCAA for the Pirates last 2013 & 2014 seasons.

== Injuries ==
- Jeo Ambohot suffered a fracture on his right wrist during the game against San Sebastian Stags. Ambohot received a hard foul from Stags forward JM Calma and landed badly on his right wrist.

== NCAA Season 93 games results ==
Elimination games were played in a double round-robin format. All games were aired on ABS-CBN Sports and Action.

| Date | Time | Opponent | Venue | Result | Record |
|---|---|---|---|---|---|
First round of eliminations
| Jul 11 | 4:00 p.m. | Mapúa Cardinals | Filoil Flying V Centre • San Juan | L 75–78 | 0–1 |
Game Highs: Points: Balanza – 15; Rebounds: Ambohot – 12; Assists: Calvo – 4
| Jul 18 | 12:00 p.m. | EAC Generals | Filoil Flying V Centre • San Juan | W 83–80 | 1–1 |
Game Highs: Points: Ambohot – 15; Rebounds: Nambatac – 9; Assists: Nambatac, Quinto – 5
| Jul 21 | 2:00 p.m. | JRU Heavy Bombers | Filoil Flying V Centre • San Juan | L 62–65 | 1–2 |
Game Highs: Points: Quinto – 16; Rebounds: Ambohot Calvo, Quinto – 6; Assists: Ambohot, Calvo, Nambatac – 2
| Jul 25 | 4:00 p.m. | San Beda Red Lions | Filoil Flying V Centre • San Juan | L 74–81 | 1–3 |
Game Highs: Points: Balanza – 20; Rebounds: Quinto – 15; Assists: Balanza, Calvo, Quinto – 2
| Aug 1 | 2:00 p.m. | Arellano Chiefs | Filoil Flying V Centre • San Juan | W 82–75 | 2–3 |
Game Highs: Points: Ambohot, Nambatac – 15; Rebounds: Ambohot – 13; Assists: Nambatac – 5
| Aug 3 | 4:00 p.m. | Benilde Blazers | Letran Gym • Manila | W 92–78 | 3–3 |
Game Highs: Points: Nambatac – 31; Rebounds: Ambohot – 12; Assists: Quinto – 7
| Aug 11 | 4:00 p.m. | Perpetual Altas | Filoil Flying V Centre • San Juan | W 63–61 | 4–3 |
Game Highs: Points: Quinto – 14; Rebounds: Nambatac – 15; Assists: Nambatac, Quinto – 3
| Aug 15 | 4:00 p.m. | San Sebastian Stags | Filoil Flying V Centre • San Juan | W 79–75^{OT} | 5–3 |
Game Highs: Points: Nambatac – 23; Rebounds: Nambatac – 14; Assists: Calvo – 8
| Aug 18 | 2:00 p.m. | Lyceum Pirates | Filoil Flying V Centre • San Juan | L 68–75 | 5–4 |
Game Highs: Points: Nambatac – 16; Rebounds: Caralipio, Quinto – 7; Assists: Quinto – 4
4th place after the 1st round (5 wins–4 losses)
Second round of eliminations
| Sep 7 | 2:00 p.m. | Perpetual Altas | Filoil Flying V Centre • San Juan | L 82–88 | 5–5 |
Game Highs: Points: Calvo – 21; Rebounds: Nambatac – 12; Assists: Balanza – 4
| Sep 14 | 2:00 p.m. | JRU Heavy Bombers | Filoil Flying V Centre • San Juan | L 68–77 | 5–6 |
Game Highs: Points: Calvo – 21; Rebounds: Quinto – 12; Assists: Nambatac – 4
| Sep 19 | 4:00 p.m. | Arellano Chiefs | Filoil Flying V Centre • San Juan | W 84–73 | 6–6 |
Game Highs: Points: Calvo, Quinto – 20; Rebounds: Quinto – 10; Assists: Calvo – 5
| Sep 22 | 4:00 p.m. | Mapúa Cardinals | Filoil Flying V Centre • San Juan | W 88–79 | 7–6 |
Game Highs: Points: Nambatac – 25; Rebounds: Nambatac, Quinto – 8; Assists: Quinto – 3
| Sep 26 | 2:00 p.m. | San Sebastian Stags | Filoil Flying V Centre • San Juan | L 64–95 | 7–7 |
Game Highs: Points: Quinto – 14; Rebounds: Balagasay – 7; Assists: Nambatac – 4
| Sep 29 | 2:00 p.m. | EAC Generals | Filoil Flying V Centre • San Juan | W 84–78 | 8–7 |
Game Highs: Points: Quinto – 27; Rebounds: Nambatac – 9; Assists: Gedaria – 4
| Oct 6 | 4:00 p.m. | Lyceum Pirates | Filoil Flying V Centre • San Juan | L 69–81 | 8–8 |
Game Highs: Points: Calvo – 15; Rebounds: Nambatac – 15; Assists: Gedaria – 3
| Oct 13 | 2:00 p.m. | San Beda Red Lions | Filoil Flying V Centre • San Juan | L 68–73 | 8–9 |
Game Highs: Points: Quinto – 18; Rebounds: Ambohot – 11; Assists: Quinto – 4
| Oct 17 | 4:00 p.m. | Benilde Blazers | Filoil Flying V Centre • San Juan | W 66–60 | 9–9 |
Game Highs: Points: Nambatac – 18; Rebounds: Ambohot – 13; Assists: Nambatac – 5
Tied at 4th–6th place at 9 wins–9 losses (4 wins–5 losses in the 2nd round)
Qualification playoff
| Oct 20 | 3:30 p.m. | Arellano Chiefs | Filoil Flying V Centre • San Juan | W 70–68 | 1–0 (10–9) |
Game Highs: Points: Nambatac – 25; Rebounds: Nambatac – 9; Assists: Quinto – 4
Qualified for 4th–5th seeding
Playoff for fourth-seed
| Oct 24 | 3:30 p.m. | San Sebastian Stags | Mall of Asia Arena • Pasay | L 70–68 | 0–1 (10–10) |
Game Highs: Points: Taladua – 16; Rebounds: Ambohot – 12; Assists: Quinto – 7
Fifth place at 10 wins–10 losses (9 wins–9 losses in the eliminations)

Times listed above are in UTC+08:00

Source: Pong Ducanes, Imperium Technology
