= Belleydoux =

Commune in Auvergne-Rhône-Alpes, France

- Commune
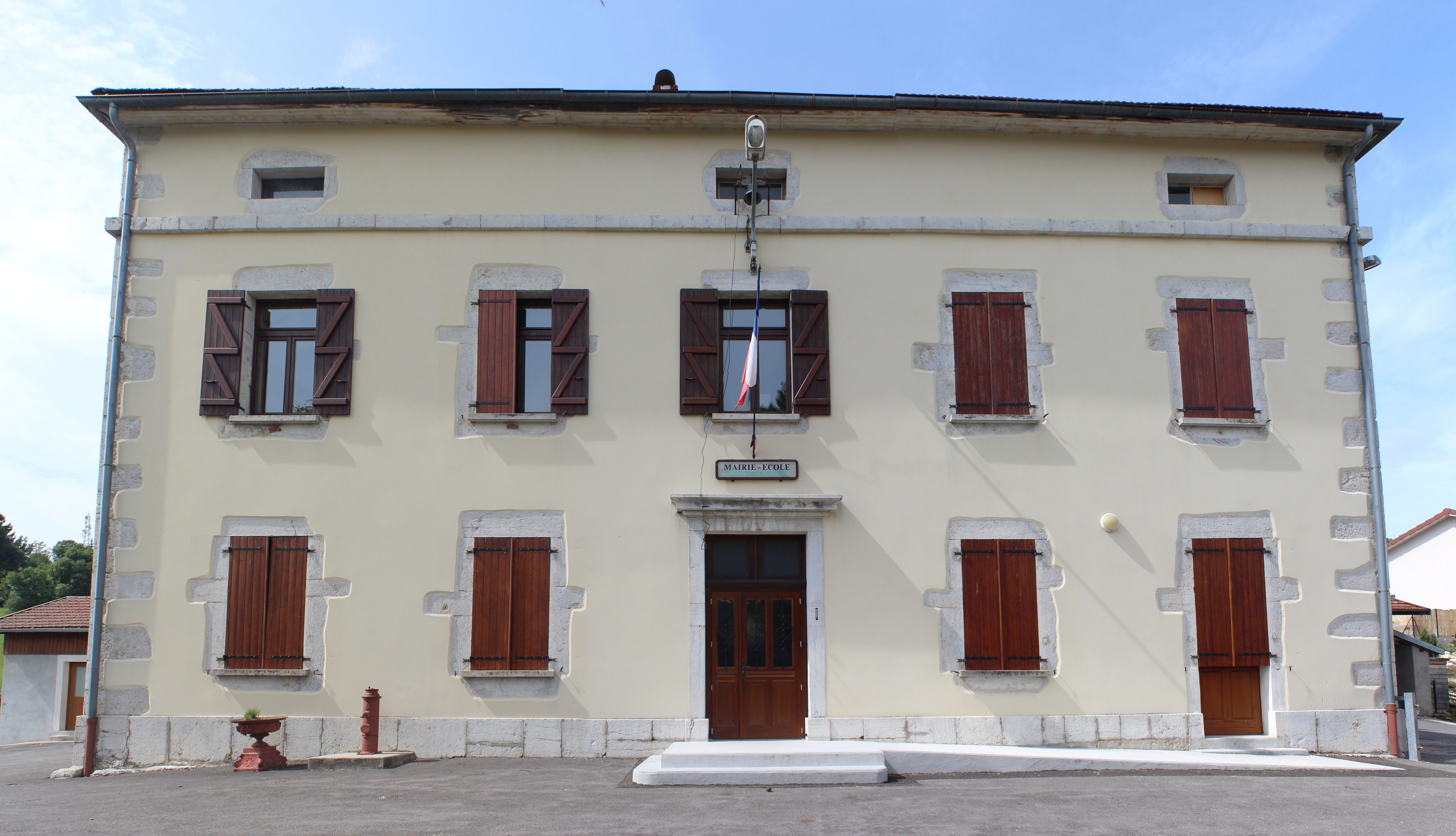
- Town hall
- Location of Belleydoux
- Location within France Location within Auvergne-Rhône-Alpes
- Coordinates: 46°15′09″N 5°46′39″E
- Country: France
- Region: Auvergne-Rhône-Alpes
- Department: Ain
- Arrondissement: Nantua
- Canton: Nantua
- Intercommunality: Haut-Bugey Agglomération

Government
  - Mayor (2020–2026): Pascal Courtois
- Area^{1}: 17.63 km^{2} (6.81 sq mi)
- Elevation: 834 m (2,736 ft)
- Highest elevation: 1,281 m (4,203 ft)
- Lowest elevation: 616 m (2,021 ft)
- Population (2023): 306
  - Density: 17.4/km^{2} (45.0/sq mi)
- Time zone: UTC+01:00 (CET)
  - Summer (DST): UTC+02:00 (CEST)
- INSEE/Postal code: 01035 /01130
- Website: https://www.belleydoux.fr/
- ^{1} French Land Register data, which excludes lakes, ponds, glaciers > 1 km^{2} (0.386 sq mi or 247 acres) and river estuaries.

Belleydoux (French pronunciation: [bəlɛdu]) is a commune in the Ain department in eastern France.

== Geography ==
Belleydoux is situated at the southernmost end of the Hautes-Combes in the Jura Mountains, and lies in the Semine valley, a tributary of the Rhône via the Valserine river. The village is overlooked by the Roche Fauconnière cliff.

== Population ==
Historical population
Year	Pop.	±% p.a.
1968	250	—
1975	200	−3.14%
1982	222	+1.50%
1990	232	+0.55%
1999	277	+1.99%
2007	287	+0.44%
2012	332	+2.96%
2017	314	−1.11%
2023	306	−0.43%
Source: INSEE

== Notable people ==
- Gabriel Taborin (1799–1864), religious Brother and founder

== See also ==
- Communes of the Ain department
