= Calinan =

District in Davao City, Philippines

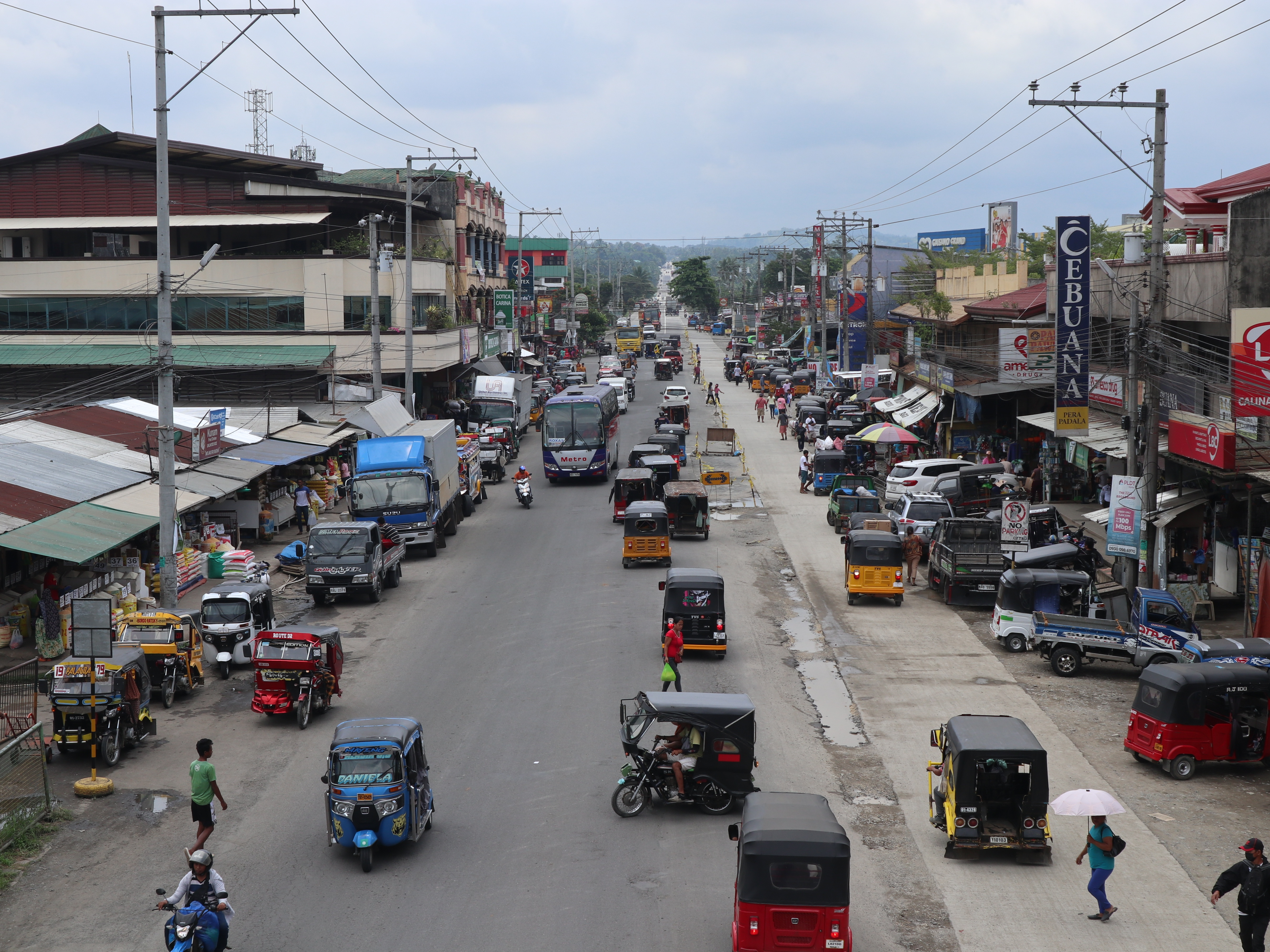

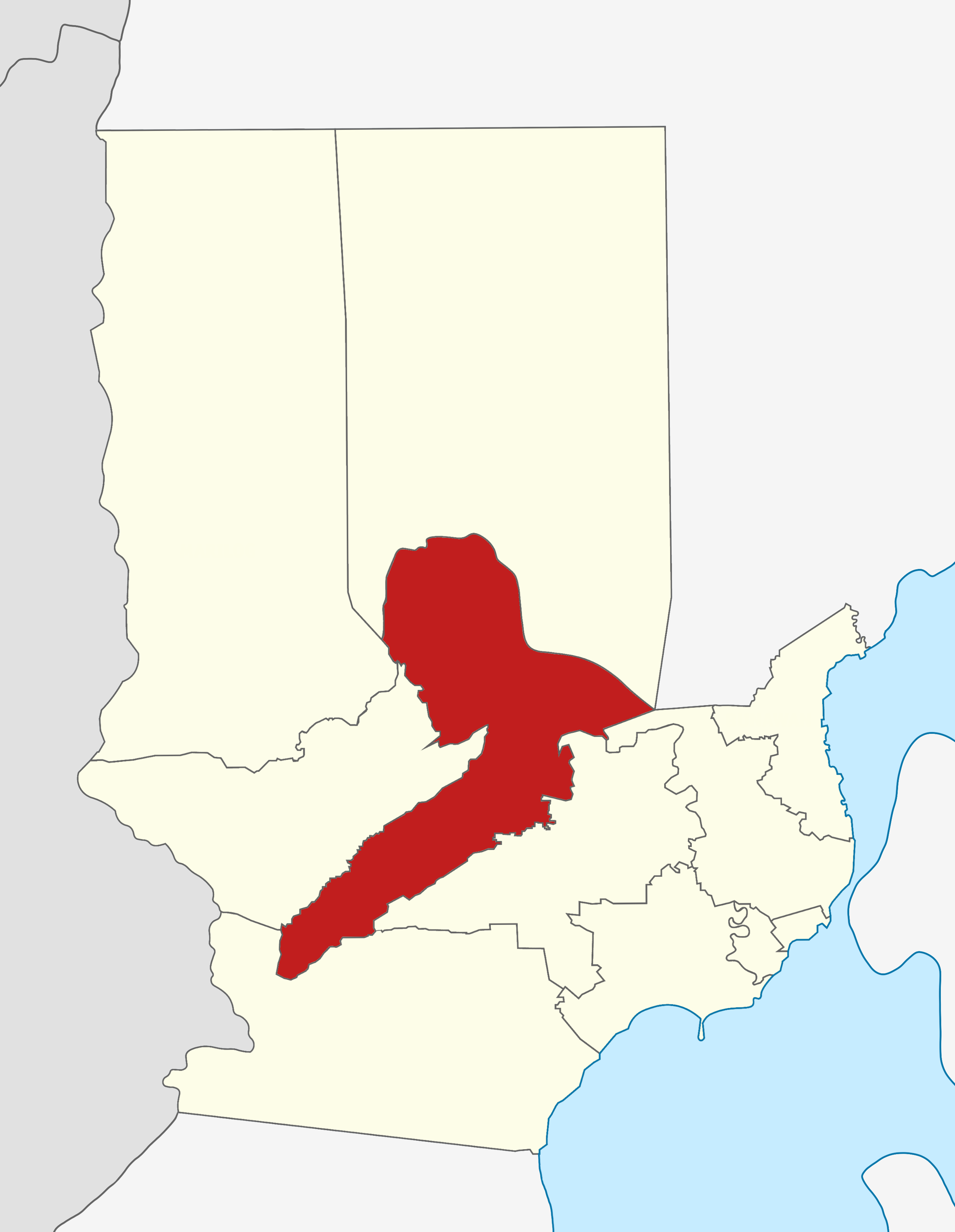
- Location of Calinan District in Davao City.
- Country: Philippines
- Region: Region XI
- Province: Davao del Sur (geographically only)
- City: Davao City

Population (2020 census)
  - Total: 102,485
- Time zone: UTC+08:00 (Philippine Standard Time)

Calinan is an administrative district of Davao City in the Philippines, which in 2020 had a population of 102,485. It is situated in the 3rd congressional district of Davao City.

Calinan is known for production of durian, cacao beans, pineapples and bananas.

== Geography ==
Calinan is a district that borders the districts of Toril, Baguio, Marilog, Paquibato, Buhangin, Tugbok, and it barely borders Davao del Norte.

== Barangays ==
Calinan is politically subdivided into 19 barangays. Each barangay consists of puroks and some have sitios.

- Biao Joaquin
- Calinan (Proper)
- Cawayan
- Dacudao
- Dalagdag
- Dominga
- Inayangan
- Lacson
- Lamanan
- Lampianao
- Megkawayan
- Pangyan
- Riverside
- Saloy
- Sirib
- Subasta
- Talomo River
- Tamayong
- Wangan

== See also ==
- Davao City
- Districts of Davao City
- Holy Cross College of Calinan
