= Gabriel Taborin =

French religions brother (1799–1864)

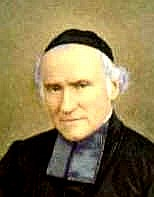
Gabriel Taborin

Gabriel Taborin (1799–1864) was a French religious brother and founder of the Brothers of the Holy Family of Belley, France.

== History ==
Taborin was born in Belleydoux, France, on November 1, 1799. He began his work in the diocese of Belley and obtained its approbation from Pope Gregory XVI in 1841.

Taborin began at a very early age to work as catechist and teacher in Belley and in the neighbouring diocese. His mission was foster a Catholic rebirth in France. The Catholic church had suffered religious persecution as a result of the French Revolution.

Taborin devoted his time to small rural centers; supporting elementary schools, catechising the Catholic parishioners, and promoting the liturgy in the parish churches. Taborine felt himself attracted to all peoples and to all individuals, loving them as brothers.

A strong believer in the value of the consecrated life. Taborin decided to found a lay institute to promulgate these Christian values. He was assisted by Mons. Raymond Devie, bishop of Belley, who served as a guide and helped, and John Vianney, Curé of Ars who helped him morally and financially..

During Taborin's life, the Institute spread in France and Savoie. Open to "every good work" he loved to get involved in mission territory. He would say: "I would rather have the title of catechist in the missions than all the titles of human worth".

Taborin died in Belley on November 24, 1864. He was reported to have the odour of sanctity. In 1991, the Vatican proclaimed Taborin as Venerable.

In 1903, as a result of rulings by the French government that limited the functions of the Institute, many of brothers dispersed to other centers in Italy and other countries.

== See also ==
Roman Catholic Diocese of Belley-Ars
