= Holy Cross College of Calinan =

Private college in Davao del Sur, Philippines

- Dalubhasaang Banal na Krus ng Calinan
- Motto: To Christ Through Mary.
- Type: Private Catholic Coeducational Basic and Higher education institution
- Established: 1948; 78 years ago
- Founder: Society of Foreign Missions (P.M.E.)
- Religious affiliation: Roman Catholic (Sisters of the Presentation of Mary)
- Academic affiliations: Davao Association of Catholic Schools CEAP
- Chairperson: Sr.Samuelita P. Enriquez, PM
- President: Sr. Zosima A. Escolano, PM
- Principal: Ma. Corazon C. Sunga, PHD (Basic Education Principal)
- Dean: Rizalito H. Paga, PHD (Dean of College)
- Location: Datu Abing St, Calinan District, Davao City, Davao del Sur, Philippines; 07°11′14.9″N 125°27′25.8″E
- Campus: Urban Main - MacArthur Highway, Calinan, Davao City, Davao Del Sur Satellite - Talomo, Davao City
- Colors: Blue and White
- Website: hccc.edu.ph

The Holy Cross College of Calinan also referred to by its acronym HCCC is a private Catholic coeducational basic and higher education institution administered by the Sisters of the Presentation of Mary in Calinan, Davao City, Philippines. It was founded by the Society of Foreign Missions (P.M.E.) in June 1948.

== History ==
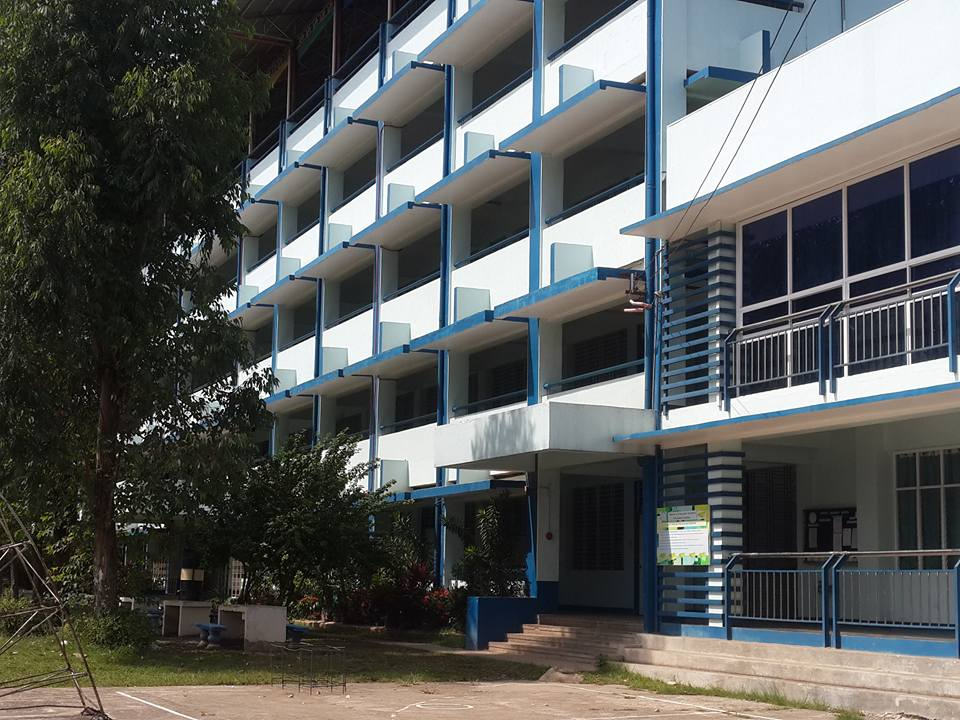
College Building

The college was established by the priests of the Society of Foreign Missions (P.M.E.) in June 1948 as a high school institution. In 1958, the Sisters of the Presentation of Mary, a Catholic religious women's congregation, took over the management of the school from the priests of the Society of Foreign Missions (P.M.E.). With the rapid growth of the school population the Sisters of the Presentation of Mary opened the college department in 1964, and offered the four-year course in Education, Liberal Arts and Commerce with an initial enrolment of 68 students.

In 1967–1968, the first college enrollees were ready to graduate from the four-year course in the college department. There was a total of 37 graduates for that year.

In 1989–1900, the HCCC added Nursing Aide for protection, General Electronics, and Practical Electricity.

== Campus ==
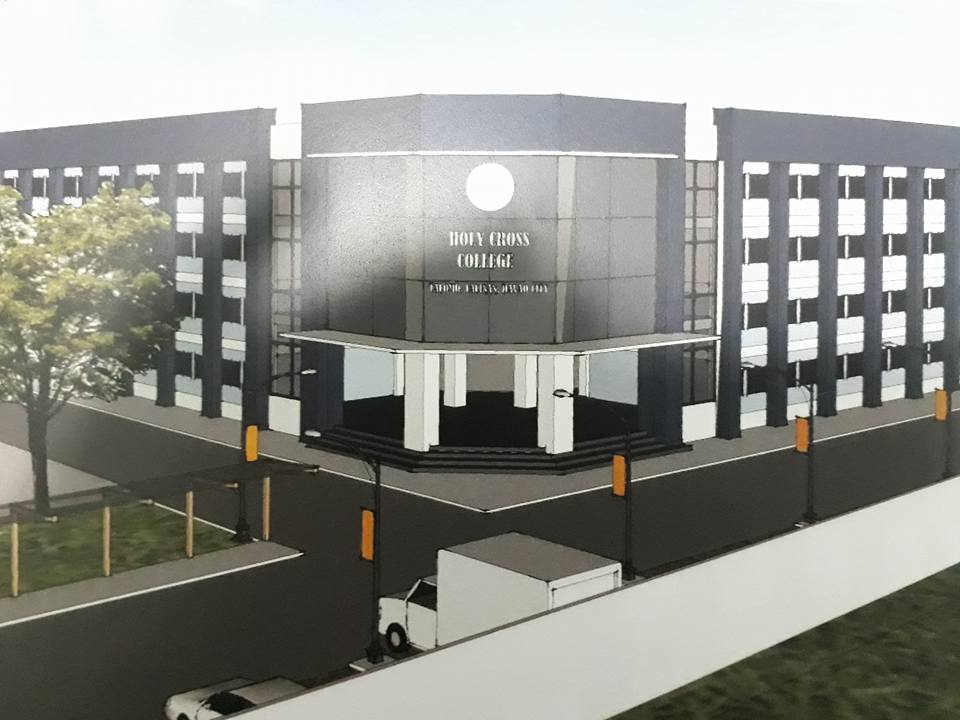
Reconstruction

HCCC has two campuses: the Main Campus at Buda National Highway and the Talomo Campus, which is still under construction.

== Academics ==
=== Colleges ===
- Business Administration
- Education
- Liberal Arts

== Incident ==
At the event, a Grade 7 student named Anne Bansag later died after suffering a third-degree burn when her costume caught fire while participating in the school's intramurals, October 25, 2019.

== Notable ==
- In 1993, Ines Yamanouchi P. Mallari graduated with a BA Major in Arts in English Literature.
- In September 2019, a student named Justine Abella has been ranked in the top 10 of the September LET exams in Davao City.
