= McJour Luib =

Filipino basketball coach

Personal information
- Listed height: 5 ft 11 in (1.80 m)

Career information
- High school: Letran (Manila)
- College: Letran
- PBA draft: 2016: undrafted
- Coaching career: 2016–present

Career history

Coaching
- 2016–2018: De La Salle (assistant)
- 2018–2020: UST (assistant)
- 2022–2024: Converge FiberXers (1st assistant)

Career highlights
- As assistant coach: UAAP Seniors champion (2016); As player: NCAA Seniors champion (2015)

McJour Luib is a Filipino coach who previously served as first assistant coach for the Converge FiberXers in the PBA.

== Career ==
=== Playing ===
Luib played for Letran Knights under 4 different coaches: Louie Alas, Caloy Garcia, Aldin Ayo and Jeff Napa. He won a championship under Ayo's coaching in 2015.

=== Coaching ===
==== UAAP ====
Being undrafted in 2016 draft, Luib joined Ayo at De La Salle Green Archers.

When Ayo left La Salle for UST, Luib also joined him. He resigned with Ayo and Jinino Manansala in 2019 due to Sorsogon bubble training controversy.

==== Converge ====
When Ayo was hired by the Converge FiberXers as head coach, Luib tapped by Ayo as his 1st assistant (equivalent of Assoiciate HC in the NBA). He played for the FiberXers for PBA On Tour, when the team was injury-depleted that time.

Before the 2024–25 season, Luib and Ayo left the team.
