= Districts of Davao City =

The following is the list of the 182 barangays of Davao City, Philippines, arranged according to the 3 legislative districts and 11 administrative districts of Davao City.

== Legislative districts ==
Legislative District	Administrative District (No. of Barangays)	Population (as of 2024)	Land Area (per sq. km.)	Barangays
1st	Poblacion (40)	182,755	11.38	1-A; 2-A; 3-A; 4-A; 5-A; 6-A; 7-A; 8-A; 9-A; 10-A; 11-B; 12-B; 13-B; 14-B; 15-B; 16-B; 17-B; 18-B; 19-B; 20-B; 21-C; 22-C; 23-C; 24-C; 25-C; 26-C; 27-C; 28-C; 29-C; 30-C; 31-D; 32-D; 33-D; 34-D; 35-D; 36-D; 37-D; 38-D; 39-D; 40-D
1st	Talomo (14)	467,813	89.16	Bago Aplaya; Bago Gallera; Baliok; Bucana; Catalunan Grande; Catalunan Pequeño; Dumoy; Langub; Ma-a; Magtuod; Matina Aplaya; Matina Crossing; Matina Pangi; Talomo Proper
2nd	Agdao (11)	99,617	593.00	Agdao Proper; Centro (San Juan); Gov. Paciano Bangoy; Gov. Vicente Duterte; Kap. Tomas Monteverde, Sr.; Lapu-Lapu; Leon Garcia; Rafael Castillo; San Antonio; Ubalde; Wilfredo Aquino
2nd	Buhangin (13)	311,932	95.08	Acacia; Alfonso Angliongto Sr. (Note: Created into separate barangays under Sangguniang Panlungsod Ordinance No. 16103, ratified on July 25, 2004; taken from Barangay Pampanga.); Buhangin Proper; Cabantian; Callawa; Communal; Indangan; Mandug; Pampanga; Sasa; Tigatto; Vicente Hizon Sr.; Waan
2nd	Bunawan (9)	176,145	66.94	Alejandra Navarro (Lasang); Bunawan Proper; Gatungan; Ilang; Mahayag; Mudiang; Panacan; San Isidro (Licanan); Tibungco
2nd	Paquibato (13)	58,040	662.42	Colosas; Fatima (Benowang); Lumiad; Mabuhay; Malabog; Mapula; Panalum; Pandaitan; Paquibato Proper; Paradise Embak; Salapawan; Sumimao; Tapak
3rd	Baguio (8)	41,004	190.23	Baguio Proper; Cadalian; Carmen; Gumalang; Malagos; Tambobong; Tawan-Tawan; Wines
3rd	Calinan (19)	109,233	232.36	Biao Joaquin; Calinan Proper; Cawayan; Dacudao; Dalagdag; Dominga; Inayangan; Lacson; Lamanan; Lampianao; Megkawayan; Pangyan; Riverside; Saloy; Sirib; Subasta; Talomo River; Tamayong; Wangan
3rd	Marilog (12)	66,534	638.00	Baganihan; Bantol; Buda; Dalag; Datu Salumay; Gumitan; Magsaysay; Malamba; Marilog Proper; Salaysay; Suawan (Tuli); Tamugan
3rd	Toril (25)	177,069	294.59	Alambre; Atan-Awe; Bangkas Heights; Baracatan; Bato; Bayabas; Binugao; Camansi; Catigan; Crossing Bayabas; Daliao; Daliaon Plantation; Eden; Kilate; Lizada; Lubogan; Marapangi; Mulig; Sibulan; Sirawan; Tagluno; Tagurano; Tibuloy; Toril Proper; Tungkalan
3rd	Tugbok (18)	158,805	153.91	Angalan; Bago Oshiro; Balenggaeng; Biao Escuela; Biao Guinga; Los Amigos; Manambulan; Manuel Guianga; Matina Biao; Mintal; New Carmen; New Valencia; Santo Niño; Tacunan; Tagakpan; Talandang; Tugbok Proper; Ula
