= Jino Manansala =

Filipino basketball coach

Saint Clare Saints
- Title: Head coach
- League: NAASCU

Personal information
- Listed height: 5 ft 8 in (1.73 m)

Career information
- College: UST
- Position: Point Guard
- Number: 11, 15
- Coaching career: 2012–present

Career history

Coaching
- 2012–present: Saint Clare College of Caloocan
- 2020–2022: UST HS
- 2020–2022: UST
- 2022–2023: UST HS
- 2023: Imus SV Squad
- 2023–2024: UST HS (assistant)
- 2024–present: Biñan Tatak Gel (assistant)
- 2025: Letran (assistant)

Career highlights
- As head coach: 7× NAASCU Champion (2012–13, 2016–17, 2017–18, 2018–19, 2019–20, 2022–23, 2023–24)

Jinino "Jino" Manansala is a Filipino basketball coach for Saint Clare Saints in NAASCU. He is the son of former PBA player Jimmy Manansala.

== Career ==
=== Playing ===
Manansala was a former UST Growling Tigers player under Aric del Rosario. He became team captain in 2003, in his final year of playing and del Rosario's final year of coaching the team.

=== Coaching ===
==== Saint Clare ====
Since 2012, Manansala coached the Saint Clare Saints in NAASCU, and on his first year, he won a championship. The team made finals for the next 3 years, all losing to CEU Scorpions, before creating another 4-peat championship from 2016 until 2019.

==== UST ====
Manansala was appointed as UST Tiger Cubs head coach since 2020. In this time, he was also appointed as interim head coach of the seniors team, UST Growling Tigers. He was later replaced by Bal David. He later returned to Tiger Cubs, and coached the team until 2023, when Manu Iñigo was appointed as head coach. Manansala stayed as his assistant.

==== Return to Saint Clare ====
Manansala returned to coaching Saint Clare, and won back-to-back titles.
