= Joji Ilagan International Schools =

Private college in Davao City, Philippines

Joji Ilagan Career Center Foundation
- Other names: Joji Ilagan International Schools; JIB
- Motto: Truly International, Truly Global
- Type: Private Nonsectarian
- Established: 1982
- Chairperson: Joji Ilagan Bian
- President: Atty. Jose Edgar J. Ilagan
- Vice-president: Nicole Niña I. Hao Bian-Ledesma (VP for Education Development); Mercy Fidelis D. Ilagan (VP for Finance and Administration)
- Dean: Anne Margaret Pelingon (Davao City); Esiel Cabrera (General Santos)
- Academic staff: 50
- Administrative staff: 100
- Undergraduates: Approx. 1000-1500 (across all schools)
- Other students: Approx. 400-500 (preschool and elementary)
- Location: Davao City, Davao del Sur, Philippines; 7°04′28″N 125°37′04″E
- Colors: Green, Yellow and Blue (JIB-CBT/JIB-IS/IMS); Orange and White (ICHEF); Maroon, Purple and Sky Blue (CAISA); Yellow and Blue (SAIS)
- Website: jib.edu.ph
- Location in Mindanao Location in the Philippines

Joji Ilagan Career Center Foundation, Inc. (doing business under the name Joji Ilagan International Schools, and the acronym JIB) is a conglomerate of schools under the JIB Group of Companies, based in Davao City, Philippines. It was founded by its chairwoman, Joji Ilagan Bian, after whom the school is named. The schools specialize in tourism, hospitality, culinary and entrepreneurship courses.

== History ==
Joji lIagan Career Centre Foundation, Inc. was founded in 1982 by businesswoman and educator Purita Arsenia "Joji" Ilagan, in a four-classroom facility in Anda Street (now F. Iñigo Street), Davao City. Joji Ilagan studied at the Immaculate Conception College (now University of the Immaculate Conception) and became the grade school valedictorian and high school salutatorian. At 16, she became an academic scholar at the University of the Philippines Diliman, Quezon City, where she earned a Bachelor of Science degree in Hotel and Restaurant Management. After graduating with a degree in Hotel and Restaurant Administration at the University of the Philippines Diliman, she established a vocational school that would give holistic training and was capable of meeting the demands of the job market at that time.

The school eventually moved to its current location in Governor Chavez Street, Davao City and established vocational and baccalaureate programs in tourism, computer skills, dressmaking, and hotel and restaurant management. In 2009, JIB established the first culinary school in Mindanao, the Institute of International Culinary and Hospitality Entrepreneurship or ICHEF. It initially offered a 2-year diploma program in Culinary in partnership with Technical and Further Education (TAFE) of New South Wales Western Sydney Institute. Later, it opened a 4-year Bachelor of Science in Culinary Management being one of the few schools in the Philippines offering the said degree program.

In 2010, JIB expanded further into General Santos as it opened the Joji Ilagan International School of Hotel and Tourism Management. It initially offered culinary programs and later HRM and tourism programs.

== Sister schools ==
The Joji Ilagan International Schools is composed of a network of exclusive schools based in Davao City and General Santos. The campuses are overseen and monitored by government departments, such Department of Education (DepEd), Technical Skills and Development Authority (TESDA), and the Commission on Higher Education (CHED).

Pursuant to TESDA compliance, the school offers ladderized education as well, a program that allows vocational students to pursue college easily, having their previous vocational course merits credited into their college curriculum.

- Joji Ilagan College of Business and Tourism (JIB-CBT) is the pioneer school of JIB, based in JIB Building, Governor Chavez Street, Barangay 30-C, Davao City, Philippines, established in 1982. It offers Hospitality Management (formerly Hotel and Restaurant Management) and Tourism Management degrees, ranging from Grand Diploma (2-years) to bachelor's degree (4-years), as well as offering Senior High School programs under the Home Economics strand of the Technical-Vocational track, with sub-strands, namely: Travel and Tourism Entrepreneurship, Hotel and Restaurant Entrepreneurship, and Culinary and Patisserie Entrepreneurship, and the Academic track, with the following strands: Accountancy and Business Management (ABM), Humanities and Social Sciences (HUMSS), and General Academic Strand (GAS).
- Institute of International Culinary and Hospitality Entrepreneurship (ICHEF) is the culinary school of JIB, located at S. De Jesus Street, Barangay 35-D, Davao City, established in 2009. It is the first culinary school established in Mindanao and is one of a few schools in the Philippines offering a four-year bachelor's degree in Culinary Management.
- Joji Ilagan International School of Hotel and Tourism Management (JIB-IS) is an educational institution located at Leon Llido Street, Barangay City Heights, General Santos, established in 2010. It is the branch school of JIB in Soccsksargen offering Tourism, Hospitality, Culinary and Entrepreneurship programs.
- Tourism-Hospitality-Entrepreneurship International Management School (doing business as the International Management School, and abbreviated as THE IMS or just IMS) is the entrepreneurship institution and the current flagship school of JIB offering Business and Entrepreneurship programs, established in 2017. It is on S. De Jesus Street, Barangay 35-D, Davao City.
- Career Institute of Southeast Asia (CAISA) is the weekend school counterpart of JIB offering 2-year diploma programs in Travel and Tourism Management and Hotel and Restaurant Management. It was established in 2010. It also operates vocational courses in Welding (under the brand JIB Welding Academy) and Hair and Salon Management. It mainly operates in the JIB-CBT Campus in Gov. Chavez St., Davao City, the ICHEF Compound in De Jesus St., Davao City and in its branch campus in Cabantian, Davao City.
- Stockbridge American International School (SAIS, formerly Tumble Tots Philippines) is the primary education component of JIB, offering an American curriculum from preschool to Grade 12. It has branches in Stockbridge Building, Barangay Ma-a, Davao City, and in the JIB Building, Leon Llido Street, General Santos. It was established in 2006 as the Philippine franchisee of UK-based nursery school Tumble Tots. It was then rebranded as Stockbridge American International School in 2015 as it re-established with a US-based curriculum.

== Academic units ==
=== Undergraduate programs ===
- College of Business and Tourism
  - Hospitality Management
  - Tourism Management
- Institute of International Culinary and Hospitality Entrepreneurship
  - Culinary Management
- International Management School
  - Entrepreneurship

=== Vocational programs ===
- Career Institute of Southeast Asia
  - Hospitality, Tourism and Cruise Ship Services
  - Welding (as JIB Welding Academy)
  - Hair and Salon Management

=== Basic education programs ===
JIB also has pre-school, elementary and secondary programs under Stockbridge American International School. Senior high school programs are also offered in JIB-CBT, ICHEF and JIB-IS.
