= 2015 Letran Knights basketball team =

2015 Letran Knights men's basketball

NCAA Season 91 champions

Record
- Elims rank: #2
- Final rank: #1
- 2015 record: 16–7 (13–5 elims)
- Head coach: Aldin Ayo (1st season)
- Assistant coaches: Glenn Capacio; Jose Luis Gonzalez; Kerby Raymundo; Napoleon Garcia
- Captain: Mark Cruz (5th season)

The 2015 Letran Knights men's basketball team represented Colegio de San Juan de Letran in the 91st season of the National Collegiate Athletic Association in the Philippines. The men's basketball tournament for the school year 2015-16 began on June 27, 2015, and the host school for the season was Mapúa Institute of Technology.

The Knights finished the double round-robin eliminations tied at first and second places together with the defending champions San Beda Red Lions with 13 wins against 5 losses. In the classification match, the Knights failed to clinched the top seed, but still got the twice-to-beat advantage going in to the Final Four. In the Final Four, the Knights beat the Mapúa Cardinals led by Nigerian center and newly crowned Season 91 MVP Allwell Oraeme, 91–90, and went on to the Finals to face the defending champions San Beda.

The Knights then defeated the Red Lions in three games, with the final game reached in overtime, ending a ten-year title drought. Mark Cruz was named NCAA Finals MVP, averaging 17.3 points, 6.3 rebounds, 4.3 assists, and three steals.

== Roster ==
Letran Knights roster
Players
Coaches

Pos.	No.	Nat.	Name	Height	Year	High School
F	4	(Israel)	Apreku, Felix Jr.	6'4" (1.93m)	2nd	PCU Dasmarinas
C	5	(Philippines)	Sollano, Jomari	6'4" (1.93m)	1st	Clarencio Calagos Memorial School of Fisheries
G	6	(Philippines)	Nambatac, Rey Benedict C.	5'11" (1.8m)	3rd	Colegio de San Juan de Letran
G	7	(Philippines)	Balanza, Jerrick G.	6'2" (1.88m)	1st	Colegio de San Juan de Letran
G	8	(Philippines)	Calvo, John Paul	6'0" (1.83m)	2nd	Hua Siong College of Iloilo
G	9	(Philippines)	Cruz, Mark L. (C)	5'7" (1.7m)	5th	Colegio de San Juan de Letran
G	10	(Philippines)	Luib, McJour	5'11" (1.8m)	4th	Colegio de San Juan de Letran
G	12	(Philippines)	Bernabe, Maui Matthew	5'9" (1.75m)	1st	University of the East
F	12	(Philippines)	De La Peña, Chrisantoni	6'4" (1.93m)	2nd	De La Salle Lipa
G	13	(Philippines)	Gedaria, Tommy York	5'9" (1.75m)	1st	Colegio de San Juan de Letran
C	15	(Philippines)	Balagasay, Christian	6'5" (1.96m)	1st	Northridge Montessori School
F	16	(Philippines)	Racal, Kevin Kent (C)	6'3" (1.91m)	5th	Muntinlupa National High School
G	17	(Philippines)	Buenaflor, Kevin	–	2nd	Southernside Montessori School
F	18	(Philippines)	Publico, Reynaldo Jr.	6'4" (1.93m)	5th	–
G	19	(Philippines)	Quinto, Kier John	6'0" (1.83m)	2nd	Colegio de San Juan de Letran

Head coach

- Aldin Ayo

Assistant coach(es)

- Glenn Capacio
- Louie Gonzales
- Kerby Raymundo
- Napoleon Garcia

Team manager

- Manny Pacquiao
- Ricky Paulino

Legend

- (C) Team captain
- Injured

=== Depth chart ===
Pos.	Starting 5	Bench 1	Bench 2
C	Sollano	Balagasay	De La Peña
PF	Apreku	Quinto	Publico
SF	Racal	Nambatac	Buenaflor
SG	Luib	Calvo	Balanza
PG	Cruz	Gedaria	Bernabe

== Coaching changes ==
Letran officials hired Aldin Ayo as the new head coach for the Knights, replacing Caloy Garcia. Ayo, then a Sorsogon CIty councilor and head coach of the city's youth program, was the former point guard of the Letran Knights in 1998 & 1999.

Added to the sidelines were former PBA player and former head coach of FEU Tamaraws Glenn Capacio, former FEU assistant coach and Letran alumnus Louie Gonzalez, and Filipino boxing icon Manny Pacquiao as its team manager.

== Roster changes ==
The Knights lost two of its key players last season, Ford Ruaya and Jamil Gabawan, as they have used up their eligibility. Chester Saldua and Daryl Singontiko opted to transfer to University of Perpetual Help System DALTA, while Fidel Castro and John Tambeling also transferred to PCU.

Holdovers were Mark Cruz, Kevin Racal, Rey Nambatac, McJour Luib and Bong Quinto. Added to the roster were Jerrick Balanza and Tommy Gedaria from the Letran Squires program, and transferee Jom Sollano.

== Suspensions ==
- The NCAA Management Committee slapped Letran head coach Aldin Ayo a one-game suspension for throwing a monobloc chair in protest of a foul called on guard McJour Luib in the Knights’ 83–78 victory against Lyceum, which earned him a technical foul. Ayo already earned a warning when the Knights were playing against the San Sebastian Stags after he removed an eyeglass of his assistant and gave it to the referee.

== NCAA Season 91 games results ==
Elimination games were played in a double round-robin format. All games were aired on ABS-CBN Sports and Action.

Date	Time	Opponent	Venue	Result	Record
First round of eliminations
Jun 30	4:00 p.m.	Benilde Blazers	Filoil Flying V Arena • San Juan	W 82–53	1–0
Game Highs: Points: Cruz – 16; Rebounds: Nambatac – 9
Jul 3	4:00 p.m.	JRU Heavy Bombers	Filoil Flying V Arena • San Juan	W 78–62	2–0
Game Highs: Points: Nambatac – 25
Jul 16	4:00 p.m.	San Beda Red Lions	Filoil Flying V Arena • San Juan	W 98–80	3–0
Game Highs: Points: Racal – 20; Rebounds: Racal – 8; Assists: Cruz, Luib – 6
Jul 21	4:00 p.m.	San Sebastian Stags	Filoil Flying V Arena • San Juan	W 82–76	4–0
Jul 23	4:00 p.m.	Perpetual Altas	Filoil Flying V Arena • San Juan	W 79–71	5–0
Game Highs: Points: Cruz, Nambatac – 15
Jul 31	2:00 p.m.	Arellano Chiefs	Filoil Flying V Arena • San Juan	W 77–68	6–0
Game Highs: Points: Racal – 24
Aug 4	4:00 p.m.	Lyceum Pirates	Filoil Flying V Arena • San Juan	W 83–78	7–0
Game Highs: Points: Racal, Nambatac – 19
Aug 7	2:00 p.m.	EAC Generals	Filoil Flying V Arena • San Juan	L 69–83	7–1
Game Highs: Points: Racal – 18
Aug 14	2:00 p.m.	Mapúa Cardinals	Filoil Flying V Arena • San Juan	W 80–77	8–1
Game Highs: Points: Nambatac – 22; Rebounds: Nambatac – 10; Assists: Cruz – 6
1st place after 1st round (8 wins–1 loss)
Second round of eliminations
Aug 25	4:00 p.m.	San Sebastian Stags	Filoil Flying V Arena • San Juan	L 87–89	8–2
Game Highs: Points: Cruz – 30
Aug 28	4:00 p.m.	EAC Generals	Filoil Flying V Arena • San Juan	W 86–76	9–2
Game Highs: Points: Cruz – 29
Sep 4	12:00 p.m.	Lyceum Pirates	Filoil Flying V Arena • San Juan	W 74–57	10–2
Game Highs: Points: Cruz – 26
Sep 10	2:00 p.m.	Benilde Blazers	Filoil Flying V Arena • San Juan	W 79–69	11–2
Game Highs: Points: Cruz – 20
Sep 15	4:00 p.m.	Mapúa Cardinals	Filoil Flying V Arena • San Juan	L 77–82	11–3
Game Highs: Points: Cruz – 17
Sep 18	4:00 p.m.	JRU Heavy Bombers	Filoil Flying V Arena • San Juan	L 80–86	11–4
Game Highs: Points: Racal – 23
Sep 25	4:00 p.m.	Arellano Chiefs	Filoil Flying V Arena • San Juan	W 87–81	12–4
Game Highs: Points: Nambatac – 21
Oct 6	4:00 p.m.	San Beda Red Lions	Filoil Flying V Arena • San Juan	L 73–77	12–5
Game Highs: Points: Nambatac – 16
Oct 9	4:00 p.m.	Perpetual Altas	Filoil Flying V Arena • San Juan	W 93–64	13–5
Game Highs: Points: Cruz – 18; Assists: Cruz – 8
Tied at 1st–2nd place at 13 wins–5 losses (5 wins–4 losses in the 2nd round)
Playoff for first-seed
Oct 13	4:00 p.m.	San Beda Red Lions	Mall of Asia Arena • Pasay	L 78–83	0–1 (13–6)
Game Highs: Points: Cruz – 29
Advanced to semifinals
Final Four (Note: Letran held a twice-to-beat advantage over Mapúa)
Oct 20	2:00 p.m.	Mapúa Cardinals	Mall of Asia Arena • Pasay	W 91–90	1–0 (14–6)
Game Highs: Points: Cruz – 26; Rebounds: Racal – 12; Assists: Cruz – 6
Letran wins series in one game
Finals
Oct 23	4:00 p.m.	San Beda Red Lions	Mall of Asia Arena • Pasay	W 94–90	1–0 (15–6)
Game Highs: Points: Racal – 28; Rebounds: Racal – 6; Assists: Racal – 5
Oct 27	4:00 p.m.	San Beda Red Lions	Mall of Asia Arena • Pasay	L 61–68	1–1 (15–7)
Game Highs: Points: Cruz – 21; Rebounds: Sollano – 7
Oct 29	4:00 p.m.	San Beda Red Lions	Mall of Asia Arena • Pasay	W 85–82^{OT}	2–1 (16–7)
Game Highs: Points: Racal – 23; Assists: Cruz – 7
Knights clinched 17th NCAA championship

Times listed above are in UTC+08:00

Source: ABS-CBN Sports

== Awards ==
Player	Award
Mark Cruz	NCAA Finals Most Valuable Player
Aldin Ayo	NCAA Coach of the Year
