= Precious International School of Davao =

Private school in Davao City, Philippines

Coordinates: 7°3′28.5264″N 125°34′41.3724″E

- Former names: Davao Precious Child Academy
- Motto: Precious in the eyes of God
- Type: Private International School
- Established: June 1999
- Affiliations: Davao Association of Private Schools and Administrators
- Principal: Perla Pichon Kwan
- Location: Santos Cuyugan Rd, Talomo, Davao City, Davao del Sur, 8000, Philippines
- Language: English, Filipino
- Website: pisdavao.com

Precious International School of Davao (PISD) is a private academic institution in Matina, Davao City, Philippines.

== History ==
Founded by Perla Pichon Kwan in June 1999 as the Davao Precious Child Academy, the school began with three faculty members, one secretary and 46 enrolees. By the 2015–2016 school year, enrolment had increased to 2000.

In 2005, the school was named "The Most Effective Private Elementary School" in Region XI by the Philippines' Department of Education. The following year, a high school campus was completed and in 2015 a preschool campus was opened.

In 2017, a senior high school opened. The school offers three tracks; the Science, Technology, Engineering and Mathematics (STEM) track; Accountancy, Business, and Management (ABM) track; and the Humanities and Social Sciences (HUMSS) track. The school is affiliated with the Davao Association of Private Schools and Administrators.
