= 2022 UST Growling Tigers basketball team =

2022 UST Growling Tigers men's basketball

Record
- Elims rank: #8
- Final rank: #8
- 2022 record: 1–13
- Head coach: Bal David (1st season)
- Assistant coaches: Rodney Santos; Ronald Magtulis
- Captain: Paul Manalang (2nd season)

The 2022 UST Growling Tigers men's basketball team represented the University of Santo Tomas in the 85th season of the University Athletic Association of the Philippines. The men's basketball tournament for the academic year 2022-23 began on October 1, 2022, and the host school for the season was Adamson University.

The Tigers finished eighth and last at the end of the double round-robin eliminations, winning only one game against 13 losses as they tied the team's worst record in the Final Four era. UST won their opening match against the Adamson Soaring Falcons before going on a 13-game losing streak to end the season.

They had an average losing margin of 15.3 points against a single 9-point win for the entire season. Four of their losses were by blowouts, with three in the first round against the De La Salle Green Archers, the Ateneo Blue Eagles, and the UP Fighting Maroons by 20, 27, and 25 points respectively. They also lost to the UE Red Warriors by 30 points in the second round.

Sophomore guard Nic Cabañero emerged as the season's scoring leader with an average of 17.6 points per game. He recorded the league's highest single-game score of 33 points in their season-opener against Adamson on October 1, 2022. Starting center Adama Faye led the league in rebounds with an average of 12.2 boards per game to go with his 11.4 points per game for a double-double average.

== Roster ==
UST has listed Ivanne Callum and Trevor Valera on their reserve list, where either player can be activated to replace players who would test positive for COVID-19.

UST Growling Tigers roster
Players
Coaches

| Pos. | No. | Nat. | Name | Height | Year | High School |
|---|---|---|---|---|---|---|
| SG | 0 | (Philippines) | Ivan Lazarte | 6'2" (1.88m) | 1st | Malayan High School of Science |
| PF | 1 | (Philippines) | Recaredo Calimag Jr. | 6'4" (1.93m) | 1st | Diamond Bar High School |
| PF | 4 | (Philippines) | Christian Manaytay | 6'4" (1.93m) | 2nd | Sacred Heart School–Ateneo de Cebu |
| C | 5 | (Philippines) | Ian Joseph Herrera | 6'6" (1.98m) | 2nd | La Salle Greenhills |
| PG | 7 | (Philippines) | Kylle Matthew Magdangal | 5'11" (1.8m) | 1st | Marina High School |
| SG | 9 | (Philippines) | Nicael Dominie Cabañero | 6'3" (1.91m) | 2nd | University of Santo Tomas |
| C | 11 | (Philippines) | Joachim Eddie Laure | 6'5" (1.96m) | 1st | Nazareth School of National University |
| SF | 12 | (Australia) | Royce Deakin Mantua | 6'4" (1.93m) | 2nd | Far Eastern University–Diliman |
| SF | 15 | (Philippines) | Kenji Trey Duremdes | 6'3" (1.91m) | 1st | Nazareth School of National University |
| PG | 16 | (Philippines) | Paul Matthew Manalang (C) | 5'10" (1.78m) | 2nd | Nazareth School of National University |
| SF | 17 | (Philippines) | Miguel Pangilinan | 6'2" (1.88m) | 3rd | Nazareth School of National University |
| SF | 18 | (Philippines) | Vincent Raymund Escobido | 6'2" (1.88m) | 1st | University of Santo Tomas |
| SG | 20 | (Philippines) | JC Alvin Garing | 5'9" (1.75m) | 3rd | Divine Word College of Legazpi |
| C | 23 | (Senegal) | Adama Faye | 6'8" (2.03m) | 1st | Le Pionnier |
| SG | 24 | (Philippines) | Jonathan Ralf Gesalem | 6'1" (1.85m) | 2nd | Sacred Heart School–Ateneo de Cebu |
| SG | 33 | (United States) | Kendall Xavier Valentin | 6'2" (1.88m) | 1st | Adamson University |

Head coach

- (Philippines) Bal David

Assistant coach(es)

- Rodney Santos
- Ronald Magtulis
- Richard Melencio
- Bernie David

Team manager

- Ryan David Roxas
- Eduardo Villanueva Jr.

Legend

- (C) Team captain
- Injured

- [ Roster]

===Depth chart===

| Pos. | Starting 5 | Bench 1 | Bench 2 |
|---|---|---|---|
| C | Faye | Herrera | Laure |
| PF | Manaytay | Calimag | Duremdes |
| SF | Pangilinan | Mantua | Escobido |
| SG | Lazarte | Garing | Gesalem |
| PG | Cabañero | Manalang | Magdangal |

== Roster changes ==
The Growling Tigers have enlisted six rookies in their lineup in the wake of some offseason developments. Veterans Sherwin Concepcion and Bryan Santos were ruled ineligible by the UAAP board for having exceeded the league's age limit. The league relaxed the rules for graduating players in the belatedly-run Season 84, but had reverted them in the succeeding season which began only a few months after. Concepcion and Santos led the Tigers to the 3x3 championship last June.

Dave Ando, last season's starting center, left the team after deciding to play in the FIBA 3x3 Professional Circuit.

New head coach Bal David was able to recruit the sons of retired PBA players, Kenneth Duremdes, Ricky Calimag, and Eddie Laure through a scouting trip with assistant coach Rodney Santos in the United States. Siblings Kenji Duremdes and Kylle Magdangal, along with Calimag's son Richi agreed to suit up for the Tigers this season, as Laure's son Echo gave his commitment a month earlier.

Calimag averaged 13.6 points, 4.9 rebounds and 1.5 steals for the Diamond Bar Brahmas. He scored 13 points in their team's loss against Glendora High School in the championship game of the 2021 Gary Prestesater Classic. Magdangal averaged 10.0 points, 5.9 rebounds and 4.3 assists for the Marina High School Vikings. He scored 11 points as Marina advanced to the 2021 CIF Southern Section Finals. Duremdes and Laure were playing as rookies for the NSNU Bullpups before the pandemic and were not able to play in their senior year due to tournament cancellations. Duremdes averaged 3.1 points and 2.3 rebounds, while Laure made 3.3 points and 3.4 rebounds per game as 11th graders.

Also suiting up for the first time were Soysoy Escobido, Ivan Lazarte, and Kendall Valentin. Escobido transferred to UST from Don Bosco Technical College–Cebu for his senior high school year, but like Duremdes and Laure, he wasn't able to play due to league suspension in light of the COVID pandemic. He averaged 10.0 points per game in the 2019 MVP Sports Foundation Youth Basketball League–Cebu (MYBL). Lazarte, who was a reserve player for the Tigers last season, came from the 2018 NCAA juniors champion Malayan Red Robins, while Valentin was recruited out of the Adamson Baby Falcons' basketball program, where he played in the 3x3 tournaments.

The Tigers have also regained a replacement for Season 82 MVP Soulémane Chabi Yo, who left the team before the start of Season 84 to play professionally in Europe. Adama Faye was already eligible last season after completing his year-long residency, but had gone to his home country in Senegal and failed to come back in time for Season 84. Faye was able to rejoin the team this season.

=== Departures ===
| Pos. | No. | Nat. | Player | Height | Year | High school | Notes |
|---|---|---|---|---|---|---|---|
| SF | 6 | (Philippines) | Josemaria Ignacio Gomez de Liaño | 6' 5" | 2nd | UP Integrated School | Transferred to Ateneo de Manila |
| PG | 7 | (Philippines) | Joshua Fontanilla | 5' 11" | 4th | St. Clare College of Novaliches | Graduated |
| PF | 8 | (Philippines) | Sherwin Concepcion | 6' 3" | 2nd | Malayan High School of Science | Age ineligible |
| SG | 10 | (Philippines) | Aldave Dale Canoy | 6' 1" | 2nd | West Negros University Integrated School | Transferred to Colegio de Sta. Ana de Victorias |
| SF | 13 | (Philippines) | Bryan Samudio | 6' 4" | 2nd | Malayan High School of Science | Transferred |
| C | 14 | (Philippines) | Arnold Dave Ando | 6' 7" | 3rd | University of San Jose–Recoletos | Forwent eligibility to turn professional |
| PG | 18 | (Philippines) | Renzel Symon Yongco | 6' 1" | 1st | Saint Jude Catholic School | Age ineligible |
| PF | 26 | (Philippines) | Bryan Santos | 6' 5" | 4th | San Luis National High School | Age ineligible |

=== Acquisitions ===
| Pos. | No. | Nat. | Player | Height | Year | High school | Notes |
|---|---|---|---|---|---|---|---|
| SG | 0 | (Philippines) | Ivan Lazarte | 6' 2" | 1st | Malayan High School of Science | Promoted from Team B |
| PF | 1 | (Philippines) | Recaredo Calimag Jr. | 6' 4" | 1st | Diamond Bar High School | Rookie |
| PG | 7 | (Philippines) | Kylle Matthew Magdangal | 5' 11" | 1st | Marina High School | Rookie |
| PF | 11 | (Philippines) | Joachim Eddie Laure | 6' 5" | 1st | Nazareth School of National University | Rookie |
| SG | 15 | (Philippines) | Kenji Trey Duremdes | 6' 3" | 1st | Nazareth School of National University | Rookie |
| SF | 18 | (Philippines) | Vincent Raymund Escobido | 6' 2" | 1st | University of Santo Tomas | Rookie |
| C | 23 | (Senegal) | Adama Faye | 6' 8" | 1st | Le Pionnier | Transferred from National University |
| SG | 33 | (United States) | Kendall Xavier Valentin | 6' 2" | 1st | Adamson University | Rookie |

=== Recruiting class ===
| Name | Pos. | Height | High school | Hometown | Commit date | Ref. |
|---|---|---|---|---|---|---|
| Ivan Lazarte | SG | 6' 2" | Malayan High School of Science | Dumaguete | 20 Oct 2020 | |
| Ivan Lazarte | 2018 NBTC Top 24 rank: N/A (National Finals #26 seed, Division 2 semifinalist with SLS–Don Bosco; Division 2 All-Star game participant with Team Dedication) | | | | | |
| Ivan Lazarte | 2019 NBTC Top 24 rank: N/A (National Finals #2 seed, Division 1 Sweet 16 participant with Malayan High School) | | | | | |
| Soysoy Escobido | SF | 6' 2" | University of Santo Tomas | Carcar | 8 Jul 2021 | |
| Soysoy Escobido | 2019 NBTC Topp 24 rank: N/A (NBTC–Cebu regional semifinalist with Don Bosco Technical College–Cebu) | | | | | |
The National Basketball Training Center (NBTC) is a grassroots program in the Philippines that develops and ranks outstanding players from high schools who compete in a five month-long nationwide youth basketball tournament. The program has enabled local coaches to recruit skilled players to play collegiate basketball.

== Coaching changes ==
Bal David replaced Jino Manansala as the head coach of the Growling Tigers on July 22, 2022. The coaching change was confirmed by UST's Institute of Physical Education and Athletics head Fr. Rodel Cansancio.

Manansala was earlier reassigned to coach the Tiger Cubs, the school's high school basketball program after McJour Luib, the former coach tendered his resignation at the end of the Season 84 tournament. Luib was Manansala's chief deputy at the senior squad. Apart from the Tigers' losing season, where the team finished with only three wins, the inability to reinstate former coach Aldin Ayo led to the resignation of the majority of Manansala's assistant coaches.

David has already applied for the coaching position back in 2017 following Boy Sablan's end of tenure in the aftermath of the Tigers' 1–13 season, but Ayo eventually got the position. His coaching staff consists of retired PBA players Rodney Santos and Ronald Magtulis, two of his teammates from his Ginebra playing years; Richard Melencio, David's teammate from the 1994 UST champion team; former UST Tiger Cubs coaches Jonjon Villanueva and David's brother Bernie.

== Schedule and results ==
=== Preseason tournaments ===
UST recorded the second biggest winning margin in the history of the PBA D-League when they won by 71 points over the AMA University Titans, 150–79. Sherwin Concepcion finished with a triple-double of 14 points, 14 rebounds and 10 assists.

The PBA D-League games were aired on One Sports and PBA Rush, while the Filoil EcoOil Preseason Cup games were aired via livestream on Smart Sports' Facebook page. (Note: Sherwin Concepcion and Bryan Santos were set to play their last collegiate season in the UAAP, but the board announced that the two were ineligible for having exceeded the league's age limit. Kean Baclaan and Gani Stevens, meanwhile transferred to rival teams during the offseason after suiting up for the Tigers in the preseason tournaments.)

Preseason game log

2022 PBA D-League Aspirants Cup: 4–5
| Game | Date • Time | Opponent | Result | Record | High points | High rebounds | High assists | Location |
|---|---|---|---|---|---|---|---|---|
| 1 | Jul 9 • 10:30 am | De La Salle Green Archers | L 82–112 | 0–1 | Cabañero (21) | Santos (15) | Cabañero (4) | Araneta Coliseum Quezon City |
| 2 | Jul 14 • 12:30 pm | San Sebastian Stags | L 83–88 | 0–2 | Baclaan (17) | Tied (7) | Baclaan (8) | Araneta Coliseum Quezon City |
| 3 | Jul 19 • 11:00 am | CEU Scorpions | L 69–86 | 0–3 | Cabañero (16) | Cabañero (11) | Cabañero (7) | Ynares Sports Arena Pasig |
| 4 | Jul 21 • 10:30 am | St. Clare College Saints | L 86–87 | 0–4 | Concepcion (19) | Concepcion (10) | Baclaan (5) | Araneta Coliseum Quezon City |
| 5 | Jul 27 • 9:00 am | AMA University Titans | W 150–79 | 1–4 | Cabañero (19) | Concepcion (14) | Concepcion (10) | Smart Araneta Coliseum Quezon City |
| 6 | Jul 28 • 3:00 pm | Marinerong Pilipino Skippers | W 88–80 | 2–4 | Tied (18) | Concepcion (10) | Cabañero (3) | Ynares Sports Arena Pasig |
| 7 | Aug 2 • 1:00 pm | Letran Knights; End of eliminations | W 89–81 | 3–4 | Concepcion (17) | Concepcion (14) | Baclaan (6) | Ynares Sports Arena Pasig |
| 8 | Aug 5 • 11:00 am | St. Clare College Saints; Quarterfinal game #1 | W 98–93 | 4–4 | Baclaan (35) | Concepcion (13) | Baclaan (5) | Araneta Coliseum Quezon City |
| 9 | Aug 10 • 11:00 am | St. Clare College Saints; Quarterfinal game #2 | L 87–90 | 4–5 | Cabañero (19) | Cabañero (6) | Baclaan (5) | Araneta Coliseum Quezon City |

2022 Filoil EcoOil 15th Preseason Cup: 2–5
| Game | Date • Time | Opponent | Result | Record | High points | High rebounds | High assists | Location |
|---|---|---|---|---|---|---|---|---|
| 1 | Jul 25 • 1:00 pm | JRU Heavy Bombers | W 86–78 | 1–0 | Tied (20) | Cabañero (7) | Baclaan (9) | Filoil EcoOil Centre; San Juan |
| 2 | Aug 3 • 9:00 am | LPU Pirates | L 73–83 | 1–1 | Herrera (12) | Stevens (10) | Concepcion (4) | Filoil EcoOil Centre; San Juan |
| 3 | Aug 9 • 5:00 pm | San Sebastian Stags | L 96–100^{OT} | 1–2 | Tied (16) | Concepcion (6) | Baclaan (6) | Filoil EcoOil Centre; San Juan |
| 4 | Aug 11 • 11:00 am | De La Salle Green Archers | L 65–86 | 1–3 | Cabañero (18) | Concepcion (11) | Garing (4) | Filoil EcoOil Centre; San Juan |
| 5 | Aug 14 • 11:00 am | FEU Tamaraws | L 79–90 | 1–4 | Baclaan (19) | Baclaan (7) | Tied (3) | Filoil EcoOil Centre; San Juan |
| 6 | Aug 15 • 3:00 pm | San Beda Red Lions | W 96–91^{2OT} | 2–4 | Cabañero (26) | Baclaan (9) | Baclaan (9) | Filoil EcoOil Centre; San Juan |
| 7 | Aug 17 • 11:00 am | Letran Knights | L 77–81 | 2–5 | Tied (19) | Cabañero (6) | Cabañero (8) | Filoil EcoOil Centre; San Juan |

(#) Tournament seedings in parentheses.
All times are in UTC+08:00
.

=== UAAP games ===
Elimination games were played in a double round-robin format and, except for their second-round game against the Ateneo Blue Eagles on November 17, 2022, all of UST's games were televised on One Sports and the UAAP Varsity Channel.

UAAP Season 85 game log

Elimination round: 1–13
| Game | Date • Time | Opponent | Result | Record | High points | High rebounds | High assists | Location |
|---|---|---|---|---|---|---|---|---|
| 1 | Oct 1 • 2:11 pm | Adamson Soaring Falcons | W 69–60 | 1–0 | Cabañero (33) | Faye (15) | Cabañero (4) | Mall of Asia Arena; Pasay |
| 2 | Oct 5 • 4:38 pm | De La Salle Green Archers | L 63–83 | 1–1 | Pangilinan (11) | Pangilinan (9) | Tied (3) | PhilSports Arena; Pasig |
| 3 | Oct 9 • 12:34 pm | NU Bulldogs | L 63–69 | 1–2 | Faye (20) | Cabañero (12) | Faye (4) | Araneta Coliseum Quezon City |
| 4 | Oct 12 • 11:06 am | Ateneo Blue Eagles | L 52–79 | 1–3 | Cabañero (12) | Garing (8) | Garing (3) | Mall of Asia Arena; Pasay |
| 5 | Oct 16 • 12:35 pm | UE Red Warriors | L 68–78 | 1–4 | Cabañero (19) | Cabañero (14) | Tied (4) | Mall of Asia Arena; Pasay |
| 6 | Oct 19 • 7:14 pm | FEU Tamaraws | L 60–75 | 1–5 | Cabañero (20) | Manaytay (10) | Cabañero (5) | Mall of Asia Arena; Pasay |
| 7 | Oct 22 • 1:14 pm | UP Fighting Maroons; End of R1 of eliminations | L 51–76 | 1–6 | Faye (15) | Faye (13) | Manaytay (3) | Ynares Center; Antipolo |
| | Oct 29 • 2:00 pm | De La Salle Green Archers | Postponed due to Typhoon Paeng | | | | | Araneta Coliseum; Quezon City |
| 8 | Nov 2 • 11:07 am | UE Red Warriors | L 51–81 | 1–7 | Faye (23) | Faye (18) | Tied (3) | Mall of Asia Arena; Pasay |
| 9 | Nov 5 • 1:35 pm | Adamson Soaring Falcons | L 55–56 | 1–8 | Cabañero (22) | Faye (16) | Manalang (5) | Araneta Coliseum; Quezon City |
| 10 | Nov 17 • 7:05 pm | Ateneo Blue Eagles | L 55–72 | 1–9 | Cabañero (26) | Faye (11) | Cabañero (7) | Araneta Coliseum; Quezon City |
| 11 | Nov 20 • 1:36 pm | NU Bulldogs | L 57–67 | 1–10 | Cabañero (20) | Faye (15) | Manalang (8) | Mall of Asia Arena; Pasay |
| 12 | Nov 23 • 11:06 am | UP Fighting Maroons | L 60–78 | 1–11 | Cabañero (14) | Faye (11) | Manalang (4) | Mall of Asia Arena; Pasay |
| 13 | Nov 26 • 1:46 pm | FEU Tamaraws | L 62–77 | 1–12 | Lazarte (13) | Faye (18) | Manaytay (4) | Araneta Coliseum; Quezon City |
| 14 | Nov 30 • 2:05 pm | De La Salle Green Archers; End of R2 of eliminations | L 72–77 | 1–13 | Mantua (17) | Faye (12) | Manalang (7) | Araneta Coliseum; Quezon City |

(#) Tournament seedings in parentheses.
All times are in UTC+08:00.
Source: Imperium Technology

== UAAP statistics ==
| Player | GP | GS | MPG | FGM | FGA | FG% | 3PM | 3PA | 3P% | FTM | FTA | FT% | RPG | APG | SPG | BPG | TOV | PPG |
|---|---|---|---|---|---|---|---|---|---|---|---|---|---|---|---|---|---|---|
| Nic Cabañero | 13 | 12 | 30.2 | 87 | 223 | 39.0 | 24 | 81 | 29.6 | 31 | 60 | 51.7 | 6.6 | 2.8 | 0.8 | 0.0 | 3.5 | 17.6 |
| Adama Faye | 13 | 13 | 30.9 | 60 | 133 | 45.1 | 0 | 7 | 0.0 | 28 | 73 | 38.4 | 12.2 | 1.0 | 0.4 | 2.2 | 3.8 | 11.4 |
| Migs Pangilinan | 14 | 9 | 25.8 | 30 | 104 | 28.8 | 17 | 61 | 27.9 | 15 | 22 | 68.2 | 4.6 | 1.4 | 0.9 | 0.1 | 1.6 | 6.1 |
| Ivan Lazarte | 11 | 8 | 15.3 | 19 | 67 | 28.4 | 6 | 31 | 19.4 | 17 | 28 | 60.7 | 2.8 | 0.8 | 0.8 | 0.0 | 0.5 | 5.5 |
| Paul Manalang | 13 | 6 | 25.1 | 17 | 88 | 19.3 | 11 | 62 | 17.7 | 14 | 18 | 77.8 | 2.7 | 2.8 | 0.6 | 0.0 | 2.0 | 4.5 |
| Christian Manaytay | 14 | 10 | 19.1 | 22 | 59 | 37.3 | 0 | 8 | 0.0 | 11 | 24 | 45.8 | 4.9 | 1.5 | 0.9 | 0.3 | 1.9 | 3.9 |
| Jamba Garing | 13 | 2 | 15.7 | 18 | 51 | 35.3 | 5 | 26 | 19.2 | 6 | 10 | 60.0 | 4.2 | 1.2 | 0.8 | 0.1 | 1.1 | 3.6 |
| Richi Calimag | 13 | 3 | 14.6 | 15 | 50 | 30.0 | 10 | 37 | 27.0 | 5 | 9 | 55.6 | 2.9 | 0.8 | 0.3 | 0.1 | 1.0 | 3.5 |
| Royce Mantua | 12 | 5 | 10.5 | 13 | 49 | 26.5 | 6 | 24 | 25.0 | 7 | 12 | 58.3 | 2.3 | 0.6 | 0.3 | 0.1 | 1.0 | 3.3 |
| Echo Laure | 9 | 0 | 7.8 | 8 | 14 | 57.1 | 1 | 2 | 50.0 | 1 | 2 | 50.0 | 1.9 | 0.7 | 0.2 | 0.1 | 0.8 | 2.0 |
| Kenji Duremdes | 13 | 2 | 10.3 | 8 | 31 | 25.8 | 2 | 14 | 14.3 | 7 | 11 | 63.6 | 2.5 | 0.8 | 0.2 | 0.0 | 0.6 | 1.9 |
| Kylle Magdangal | 5 | 0 | 6.0 | 3 | 12 | 25.0 | 0 | 4 | 0.0 | 0 | 0 | 0.0 | 1.0 | 0.4 | 0.4 | 0.0 | 1.0 | 1.2 |
| Soysoy Escobido | 8 | 0 | 6.0 | 4 | 9 | 44.4 | 0 | 2 | 0.0 | 0 | 0 | 0.0 | 0.9 | 0.5 | 0.3 | 0.0 | 0.5 | 1.0 |
| Kendall Valentin | 1 | 0 | 2.8 | 0 | 0 | 0.0 | 0 | 0 | 0.0 | 1 | 2 | 50.0 | 1.0 | 0.0 | 0.0 | 0.0 | 0.0 | 1.0 |
| Ian Herrera | 11 | 0 | 3.7 | 0 | 11 | 0.0 | 0 | 5 | 0.0 | 5 | 6 | 83.3 | 0.5 | 0.0 | 0.1 | 0.0 | 0.1 | 0.5 |
| JJ Gesalem | 7 | 0 | 4.9 | 0 | 8 | 0.0 | 0 | 8 | 0.0 | 0 | 0 | 0.0 | 0.6 | 0.1 | 0.0 | 0.1 | 0.1 | 0.0 |
| Total | 14 | | 40.0 | 304 | 909 | 33.4 | 82 | 372 | 22.0 | 148 | 277 | 53.4 | 45.7 | 13.7 | 6.0 | 2.8 | 18.4 | 59.9 |
| Opponents | 14 | | 40.0 | 373 | 990 | 37.7 | 121 | 433 | 27.9 | 161 | 243 | 66.3 | 47.3 | 20.6 | 9.9 | 3.4 | 14.1 | 73.4 |

Legend
| GP | Games played | GS | Games started | MPG | Minutes per game |
| FGM | Field-goal made | FGA | Field-goal attempts | FG% | Field-goal percentage |
| 3PM | 3-point field-goal made | 3PA | 3-point field-goal attempts | 3P% | 3-point field-goal percentage |
| FTM | Free-throw made | FTA | Free-throw attempts | FT% | Free-throw percentage |
| RPG | Rebounds per game | APG | Assists per game | SPG | Steals per game |
| BPG | Blocks per game | TOV | Turnovers per game | PPG | Points per game |

Source: Imperium Technology

== Summary of games ==
The rebuilding Growling Tigers were ranked last among the eight UAAP teams by ESPN Philippines with a C rating. Even with a good showing in their preseason tournaments, the loss of their veterans to ineligibility issues and the appointment of a new head coach places a lot of uncertainties on the team's campaign this year. Sophomores Nic Cabañero and Paul Manalang are only a few months removed from their rookie season, but have now been thrust into the leadership roles in the absence of Joshua Fontanilla, Sherwin Concepcion and Bryan Santos. Cabañero had an impressive showing in the preseason, averaging 16.8 points per game in the PBA D-League, and 14.9 points per game in the Filoil EcoOil tournament.

=== First round ===
| | 1 | 2 | 3 | 4 | Total |
|---|---|---|---|---|---|
| UST | 23 | 19 | 6 | 21 | 69 |
| Adamson | 18 | 20 | 4 | 18 | 60 |

Adamson Soaring Falcons

"What coach wouldn't trust Nic (to take charge)? With those skills? Those were big shoes left by Bryan (Santos) and Sherwin (Concepcion) to fill, but he really stepped up. I told them earlier, we are dedicating this game to the players that we lost. They were working hard in practice and worked even harder in the game."

— Bal David, head coach

Cabañero scored a career-high 33 points in their 69–60 win over the Adamsonm Soaring Falcons. The Falcons had threatened within three points in the last 41.6 seconds before Cabañero converted on a step-back jumper to beat the shot clock. The Tigers went successful in defending Adamson's Jerom Lastimosa who scored only ten points in the game as he failed a three-point shot attempt while trailing 60–63.

After a high-scoring first half of play, both UST and Adamson went lethargic, scoring only six and four points, respectively to end the third period. The two squads shared a combined total of 14 turnovers in the ten-minute duration. UST was able to pick up their offense and increase their lead to ten after outscoring the Falcons, 61-51, four minutes into the fourth quarter.

Cabañero, who was celebrating his 19th birthday in a few days tallied a high field goal percentage of 72.2 on a 13-of-18 clip. His 33-point output was the highest individual score by a Tiger since Kean Baclaan scored 35 points in their preseason game in August.

De La Salle Green Archers

| | 1 | 2 | 3 | 4 | Total |
|---|---|---|---|---|---|
| UST | 21 | 19 | 6 | 17 | 63 |
| La Salle | 30 | 17 | 18 | 18 | 83 |

"Whenever Nic gets checked, there's no one else that could step up. We've tried different kinds of adjustments, but nothing seems to be working. I am hoping for a better performance from them in the second round."

— Bal David

Coming out into their second game of the season, Cabañero had become a marked man as the De La Salle Green Archers' defense held him down to just 10 points on a 5 of 20 shooting. The Archers came out with a strong start and led by as many as 12 points in the first period to close out with a 30–21 lead. The Tigers began the second quarter with a 12–3 run to come within one at 32–33, but La Salle regained steam and ended the half with a seven-point lead.

The Tigers went anemic again in the third period as the Archers limited their scoring to only six points to end the quarter with a 19-point deficit. The game got blown away as La Salle built a huge 24-point lead with still 4:18 left in the game in the final period.

NU Bulldogs

| | 1 | 2 | 3 | 4 | Total |
|---|---|---|---|---|---|
| NU | 16 | 19 | 22 | 12 | 69 |
| UST | 14 | 9 | 19 | 21 | 63 |

The Tigers lost their first-round game against the NU Bulldogs, 63–69. After trailing NU by 2 points at the end of the first period, UST went on a nine-point second quarter scoring drought. They made a recovery in the second half to come within eight points after Jamba Garing converted on a fast break at the 2:38 mark in the third period. The Bulldogs countered with an 18–8 run that stretched from the end of the quarter until the payoff period for an 18-point 62–44 lead. UST answered back with a 19–5 run and held NU scoreless for the next seven minutes. Cabañero's pull-up triple put his team to within three points at 63–67, 10.2 seconds remaining.

The Tigers fouled NU's John Lloyd Clemente in the next play to stop the clock at 7.6 seconds. Clemente converted both free throws for the final count of 69–63. UST's run came by way of fast break points, at the same time preventing the Bulldogs from running which resulted to zero fast break points on their end. They, however shot horribly from the perimeter, missing 14 out of their 16 three point shot attempts, and converting only 24-of-65 field goals. The Tigers also did poorly in free throws, with Cabañero making only 5 out of 11, four of which he missed during the crucial stretch in the fourth period.

The tandem of Cabañero and Faye registered double-doubles, with the Senegalese center making a career-high 20 points and 10 rebounds. Cabañero chipped in 16 points and 12 rebounds in the Tigers' second straight loss.

| | 1 | 2 | 3 | 4 | Total |
|---|---|---|---|---|---|
| UST | 14 | 18 | 11 | 9 | 52 |
| Ateneo | 18 | 15 | 24 | 22 | 79 |

Ateneo Blue Eagles

After a close-scoring first half, the Tigers were dealt with a 0–12 scoring run by the Ateneo Blue Eagles to widen the lead from just one point to 13 at 32–45. UST could only manage to score 11 points as the quarter ended with the team trailing by 14 points at 43–57. Their scoring drought continued as they could only come up with 9 points in the payoff period as Ateneo's lead swelled to as high as 29 points.

The Tigers were able to keep up early in the game due to their tough physical defense on the Eagles, but the ploy backfired when Faye was called for his fifth foul with still 3:11 left in the third quarter.

UE Red Warriors

| | 1 | 2 | 3 | 4 | Total |
|---|---|---|---|---|---|
| UE | 10 | 18 | 27 | 23 | 78 |
| UST | 13 | 16 | 20 | 19 | 68 |

UST's 68–78 first-round loss to UE was the first time that the Warriors defeated them since October 7, 2017. The Tigers were leading in the first two quarters, until UE's Jojo Antiporda came out firing threes to pull his team ahead. UST was trailing UE by six points when Faye got called for a disqualifying foul on Harvey Pagsanjan in the 2:01 mark of the third period. Replays showed Faye throwing an elbow at Pagsanjan during a rebounding scuffle which resulted to a one-game suspension, effective on their next game against the FEU Tamaraws.

The Tigers' tried to make up for the absence of their center, as Cabañero came up with another double-double of 19 points and 14 rebounds. The Warriors were still within sight with 1:28 left in the game, leading only by three points, until UE's Luis Villegas sparked a 14–4 run to put the game away and handed UST a ten-point 68–78 loss.

| | 1 | 2 | 3 | 4 | Total |
|---|---|---|---|---|---|
| UST | 8 | 16 | 13 | 14 | 51 |
| UP | 19 | 19 | 20 | 18 | 76 |

UP Fighting Maroons

The Tigers closed out the first round of eliminations with a 25-point loss to the UP Fighting Maroons and extended their losing streak to six games. The game started with the Maroons igniting a 14–2 run as UST finished the first period with only 8 points.

UST tried to mount a comeback with a 20–3 run to cut the deficit to 11 from a high of 28 in the last five minutes. Cabañero scored ten straight points in that period to rally his team after being down, 29–57, but UP countered with their own 16–2 run to end the game at 76–51.

The Tigers' poor shot selection resulted to a low 27.9 field goal percentage, in contrast to the Maroons' 41.8 stat line.

=== Second round ===
After the first round of eliminations, Cabañero was the second overall leader in scoring behind La Salle's Schonny Winston. His seven-game averages were 17.7 points, 7.1 rebounds, and 3.1 assists per game, with a 16.1 player efficiency rating. Faye's 11.7 points, 9.7 rebounds, and 1.7 blocks per game nets him a higher efficiency rating of 17.0.

| | 1 | 2 | 3 | 4 | Total |
|---|---|---|---|---|---|
| UE | 25 | 20 | 15 | 21 | 81 |
| UST | 14 | 9 | 13 | 15 | 51 |

UE Red Warriors

Despite Faye's double-double game of 23 points and 18 rebounds, the Tigers fared miserably as they surrendered a 30-point loss to the UE Red Warriors. The Warriors who were coming off a three-game losing streak held UST to a nine-point second quarter scoring to end the half with a 22-point 45–23 lead.

The Tigers could not get their shots to drop, making only 18 of their 66 attempts for a 27.3 field goal percentage. UE's tough defense limited Cabañero to a season-low of seven points on a 2-of-15 shooting percentage.

The Warriors blew the game wide open in the second half with UE's CJ Payawal burying five three-point shots and then capped by Pagsanjan's own three for the game's biggest lead at 34, 43.1 seconds remaining in the game. UST slid down to their seventh straight loss for a 1–7 record.

Adamson Soaring Falcons

| | 1 | 2 | 3 | 4 | Total |
|---|---|---|---|---|---|
| Adamson | 11 | 8 | 21 | 16 | 56 |
| UST | 17 | 14 | 19 | 5 | 55 |

The Growling Tigers blew a 19-point lead against Adamson in their second-round game and lost, 55–56. After a 6–4 lead at the start by the Falcons, UST took control of the rest of the first half by outscoring their opponents, 17–11 in the first quarter, and limiting them to only 8 points in the second quarter for a 12-point 31–19 score. They were leading until midway of the third period as a result of Cabañero's three-straight triples and Garing's transition three to bring the score to 47–28. Adamson began a 19–3 uprising that lasted until the 6:15 mark of the final quarter and brought down UST's lead to two at 50–48.

"That time (after the buzzer), I was frustrated with myself, because we could have won it. We were up by two with only six seconds remaining, but we still lost. (I felt that I was fouled in the last play and) I just didn't know how to express that feeling. I'm a scorer but we have roles in our team. Someone has to step up, and my coaches know that my teammates also need to step up. In basketball, you need to make timely adjustments. When I'm struggling inside, there needs to be someone who can back me up. You cannot be a leader if there is no one following you."

— Nic Cabañero

The Tigers had managed to hold on to their 2-point lead until the final 7.1 seconds when Adamson's Cedrick Manzano was fouled by Migs Pangilinan for a three-point play. Garing missed his shot in the next possession as players from both squads scrambled for the rebound. The ball went to Cabañero's hands, but the buzzer had sounded before he was able to release his shot. He topscored for the Tigers with 22 points, but as the Falcons defended him with a double-team, no other player could step up and UST ended up scoring only five points in the fourth quarter.

Ateneo Blue Eagles

| | 1 | 2 | 3 | 4 | Total |
|---|---|---|---|---|---|
| Ateneo | 22 | 13 | 27 | 10 | 72 |
| UST | 10 | 17 | 10 | 18 | 55 |

The Tigers began the game on a strong 10–3 scoring before Ateneo got going with 19 straight points and kept UST scoreless to end the first period at 10–22. Cabañero pushed his team back to a single digit deficit of eight points from a high of 14 to end the half at 27–35. The sophomore guard had already tallied 11 points, 5 rebounds, and 4 assists in only two quarters of play.

The Tigers found themselves on the losing end of a 5–19 run by the Blue Eagles at the start of the second half, where they managed to only score 10 points for the third period. By then, Ateneo's lead had swelled to 25 points. UST rallied back in the final quarter to come within eight points, as they held Ateneo to only ten points, but their efforts fell short with the game ending on another loss for the Tigers. Cabañero finished the match with 26 points, 8 rebounds, and 7 assists. Adama Faye, meanwhile had another double-double of 10 points and 11 rebounds.

"It's the second-half, it's really our weakness. It seems like we become complacent when it comes to the third quarter, then when it comes to the fourth we try recover, but that's how it always turns out, (we've run out of) time."

— Paul Manalang, team captain

NU Bulldogs

| | 1 | 2 | 3 | 4 | Total |
|---|---|---|---|---|---|
| UST | 20 | 16 | 8 | 13 | 57 |
| NU | 11 | 18 | 17 | 21 | 67 |

"I think we got lucky against Adamson (in the first round), we weren't scouted yet. Imagine, I got the job with one month of preparation... but we saw a lot of positives and we just have to work together."

— Bal David

The Tigers' 57–67 second-round loss to the NU Bulldogs enabled their opponents to enter the Final Four for the first time since the 2015 season. UST, in contrast was eliminated from the playoffs for the second straight year after suffering their tenth straight defeat. This marked the first time for the team to incur a double-digit losing streak since 2017, when they began the season with 13 straight losses that brought their streak to 17, adding to their 4 consecutive defeats from the preceding 2016 season.

UST had the game in control in the first half, leading by as high as 11 points on a 42.4 field goal percentage. Cabañero had already scored 13 of his team-high 20 points in only two quarters of play, but the Bulldogs sprang on them at the start of the second half with eight unanswered points. The Bulldogs' Clemente and Kean Baclaan scored back-to-back three-point shots to wrest the Tigers' lead at 38–37. The Tigers went scoreless for five minutes as they were outscored by their opponents in the third quarter, 8–15.

They rallied back in the final period to retake the lead by two at 54–52, but the Bulldogs made a run of their own, outscoring the Tigers, 15–3.

"That's true (about our weak third quarter performance). That's exactly it, we are consistent when it comes to that. I keep telling them, 'here we are again at the third quarter, we are always behind, scoring only in single-digits.' Maybe we need our players to act more maturely."

— Rodney Santos, assistant coach

UP Fighting Maroons

| | 1 | 2 | 3 | 4 | Total |
|---|---|---|---|---|---|
| UP | 15 | 22 | 22 | 19 | 78 |
| UST | 16 | 18 | 15 | 11 | 60 |

The Tigers extended their losing streak to 11 games after an 18-point loss to the UP Fighting Maroons. The match was close in the first half with UST gaining a 1-point advantage at the end of the first period, and were trailing the Maroons by only three points at the halftime break. The deficit had remained at three points until midway of the third quarter when UP's Cyril Gonzales and Joel Cagulangan ignited a 15–5 run for a 13-point 52–39 lead over the Tigers.

UST went scoreless at the start of the fourth period as the Maroons piled up 11 straight points for a 70–49 count. A 4–2 run by UP in the succeeding play widened the deficit to 23 points with still 6:13 left in the game. The Tigers committed a total of 23 turnovers, giving UP 22 points in transition baskets. Cabañero led UST with 14 points, while Faye had another double-double of 12 points and 11 rebounds.

FEU Tamaraws

| | 1 | 2 | 3 | 4 | Total |
|---|---|---|---|---|---|
| FEU | 24 | 16 | 16 | 21 | 77 |
| UST | 17 | 16 | 12 | 17 | 62 |

The Tigers lost for the 12th straight time as the FEU Tamaraws handed them a 15-point 62–77 defeat in their second-round game. Down by seven points after the first period, UST went toe-to-toe to match their opponents' output of 16 points in the second quarter to close the half at 33–40. They then buckled down to work to begin the second half on a 10–2 run as they took the upperhand with a 43–42 lead off a surprise triple from Echo Laure. The Tigers would then run out of firepower and allow FEU to counter with their own 14–2 run to end the third period with an 11-point deficit. The Tamaraws' Patrick Sleat scored all of his 9 points in that stretch. UST rallied back to come within seven at 53–60, with 6:40 remaining in the game, but FEU's Xyrus Torres and Bryan Sajonia rained down three straight triples to spearhead a 12–0 run. Pat Tchuente's basket extended FEU's lead to 19, with 3:06 left.

Faye posted another double-double of 10 points with a game-high of 18 rebounds, while Ivan Lazarte led in scoring with 13 points. The Tigers played without their leading scorer Cabañero, as he sat out due to an ankle sprain that he incurred during their last game against UP.

De La Salle Green Archers

| | 1 | 2 | 3 | 4 | Total |
|---|---|---|---|---|---|
| UST | 27 | 15 | 17 | 13 | 72 |
| La Salle | 21 | 16 | 18 | 22 | 77 |

Royce Mantua's breakout game was not enough to stabilize the Tigers's run as they lost to the De La Salle Green Archers, 72–77 in their last game of the season and crashed out on a 13-game losing streak. UST had led throughout the game until the final two minutes as they went scoreless for more than eight minutes.

The Tigers were leading by four points at 59–55 after three quarters, until Mantua's three-point shot at the 8:26 mark pushed the team to their biggest lead at 69–60. It was at this juncture when the coaching staff called Cabañero and Faye to the bench to rest. Their second stringers could not convert, resulting to UST's scoring drought. The Archers, on the other hand, shot nine unanswered baskets, with La Salle's JC Macalalag giving his team a two-point lead with 1:50 remaining in the game. Two free throw conversions by the Archers' Ben Phillips, off Christian Manaytay's foul extended their run to 11.

By the time Cabañero and Faye checked back in to replace the inexperienced pair of Kenji Duremdes and Laure, their shooting hands were noticeably ice-cold. Faye, in particular, committed a crucial error with 20.9 seconds remaining as he was made to receive a side-court inbound from outside the three-point arc. With UST trailing, 70–73, Faye dribbled on his foot which resulted to a costly turnover. The Archers scored four straight points as team captain Paul Manalang and Garing, who was playing his last game in a Tigers uniform got their shots blocked while driving to the basket. A last-second triple by Richi Calimag gave UST their lone field goal since Mantua's basket early in the quarter.

Mantua topscored with 17 points, on a 5 of 7 three-point shot field goal. Cabañero, who had come off the bench while still nursing a sprain, added 16 points and 4 timely assists to Mantua and Lazarte that resulted to three-point shot conversions.

== Players drafted into the PBA ==
Ian Herrera was picked 67th overall in the seventh round of the 2023 PBA draft by the Bonnie Tan-led NorthPort Batang Pier team on September 17, 2023.

| Year | Player | Round | Pick | Overall | PBA team |
|---|---|---|---|---|---|
| 2023 | Ian Herrera | 7 | 3 | 67 | NorthPort Batang Pier |
