= 2017 UST Growling Tigers basketball team =

Men's basketball team

2017 UST Growling Tigers men's basketball

Record
- Elims rank: #8
- Final rank: #8
- 2017 record: 1–13
- Head coach: Boy Sablan (2nd season)
- Assistant coaches: Tylon Dar Juan; Bam Ledesma
- Captain: Marvin Lee (3rd season)

The 2017 UST Growling Tigers men's basketball team represented University of Santo Tomas in the 80th season of the University Athletic Association of the Philippines. The men's basketball tournament for the school year 2017–18 began on September 9, 2017 and the host school for the season was Far Eastern University.

The Tigers finished eighth and last at the end of the double round-robin eliminations for the second straight year. The team went on a 17-game losing streak that dated back from Season 79, winning only their last assignment to save themselves from having a winless season.

They had a final record of 1 win against 13 losses, the worst for the team in the last 28 years. This is also a new team low in the Final Four era, beating the previous year's record of 3 wins and 11 losses.

They had an average losing margin of 13.9 points against a single 3 point win for the entire season.

Like the previous year, UST suffered three blowout losses, against the FEU Tamaraws by 26 points in the second round, and twice against the De La Salle Green Archers by 29 and 35 points in both rounds of eliminations.

Cameroonian center Steve Akomo recorded the most rebounds made in a game twice when he hauled down 20 boards against the UP Fighting Maroons on October 11 and against the UE Red Warriors on November 12, both in the second round of eliminations. In the game against UE, the Tigers compiled a league-best total of 11 shot blocks, with six coming from Akomo.

UST also came in first with team averages of 45.9 rebounds and with 4.4 shot blocks per game.

== Roster ==
UST Growling Tigers roster
Players
Coaches

Pos.	No.	Nat.	Name	Height	Year	High School
C	0	(Cameroon)	Steve Cedrick Akomo	6'9" (2.06m)	4th	Lycée bilingue de Fondonera
SF	5	(Philippines)	Regie Boy Basibas	6'3" (1.91m)	3rd	Arellano University High School
PG	7	(Philippines)	John Jordan Sta. Ana	6'0" (1.83m)	2nd	Nazareth School of National University
PG	8	(Philippines)	Oliver Wendell de Guzman	5'8" (1.73m)	2nd	Nazareth School of National University
SG	9	(Philippines)	Dean Marvin Lee (C)	5'8" (1.73m)	3rd	Far Eastern University–Diliman
SG	10	(Philippines)	Martin Arthur Romero	6'0" (1.83m)	1st	De La Salle Santiago Zobel School
PF	11	(Philippines)	Enrique Caunan, Jr.	6'5" (1.96m)	3rd	Colegio de San Juan de Letran
SF	13	(Philippines)	Zachary Lance Eden Huang	6'4" (1.93m)	3rd	Sacred Heart School–Ateneo de Cebu
PG	14	(Canada)	Ebenezer Godwin Kwawukumey	5'7" (1.7m)	1st	Vaughan Secondary School
C	15	(Philippines)	Jeepy Faundo	6'6" (1.98m)	5th	José Rizal University
PF	16	(Philippines)	Justin Arana	6'5" (1.96m)	3rd	Basud National High School
SF	17	(Philippines)	Jose Carlos Escalambre	6'2" (1.88m)	3rd	San Sebastian College–Recoletos
SG	18	(Philippines)	Leon Alfonzo Lorenzana	6'4" (1.93m)	1st	University of Santo Tomas
PF	19	(Philippines)	Christian Laurent Garcia	6'4" (1.93m)	3rd	Arellano University High School
PF	20	(Philippines)	Vaughn Jorem Soriano	6'4" (1.93m)	1st	University of Santo Tomas
C	21	(Philippines)	Jon Cornelius Macasaet	6'3" (1.91m)	3rd	San Sebastian College–Recoletos

Head coach

- (Philippines) Rodil Sablan

Assistant coach(es)

- Tylon Filipe Dar Juan
- Juben Ledesma
- Ma. Genevieve Francisco
- Gerald Esplana
- Roberto Jose

Strength & conditioning coach(es)

- John Oswald Aquino
- Kris Anthony Agarao
- Marvin James Pangilinan

Legend

- (C) Team captain
- Injured

- Roster

=== Depth chart ===
Pos.	Starting 5	Bench 1	Bench 2	Bench 3
C	Akomo	Faundo	Macasaet
PF	Caunan	Garcia	Soriano	Arana
SF	Basibas	Escalambre	Huang
SG	Lee	Romero	Lorenzana
PG	Sta. Ana	De Guzman	Kwawukumey

== Roster changes ==
The Growling Tigers' three starting seniors, Louie Vigil, Jon Sheriff and Kent Lao have already graduated, while Mario Bonleon and Renzo Subido both dropped out of the roster to play in the PBA D-League.

UST has eight new players in their roster, composed of four transferees and four rookies that includes former UST Tiger Cubs team captain Jorem Soriano, who last played in 2012. He was set to join the seniors team in 2013, but personal and family matters kept him away from basketball. He returned to the team last year and was included in the Tigers' Team B training pool.

=== Subtractions ===
Pos.	No.	Nat.	Player	Height	Year	High school	Notes
PG	6	(Canada)	Sheak Jamil Sheriff, Jr.	5' 9"	5th	Loyola Catholic Secondary School	Graduated
PF	7	(Philippines)	Jason Strait	6' 4"	2nd	Arellano University High School	Transferred to the University of the East
PG	10	(Philippines)	Henri Lorenzo Subido	5' 9"	4th	De La Salle Santiago Zobel School	On leave
SG	14	(Philippines)	Mario Emmanuel Bonleon, Jr.	6' 3"	3rd	La Salle Greenhills	On leave
C	17	(Ghana)	William Kwabena Afoakwah	6' 6"	2nd	Ideal College Senior High School	Transferred to Southwestern Christian University
SG	18	(Philippines)	Louie Philippe Vigil	6' 3"	5th	José Rizal University	Graduated
SF	19	(Philippines)	Kent Jefferson Lao	6' 4"	5th	Saint Stephen's High School	Graduated
C	20	(Japan)	Tsutomu Tateishi	6' 9"	2nd	Ateneo de Davao University	Out on injury

=== Additions ===
Pos.	No.	Nat.	Player	Height	Year	High school	Notes
C	0	(Cameroon)	Steve Cedrick Akomo	6' 9"	4th	Lycée bilingue de Fondonera	Transferred from the University of the Visayas
PG	7	(Philippines)	John Jordan Sta. Ana	6' 0"	2nd	Nazareth School of National University	Transferred from the University of the East
SG	10	(Philippines)	Martin Arthur Romero	6' 0"	1st	De La Salle Santiago Zobel School	Rookie
PG	14	(Canada)	Ebenezer Godwin Kwawukumey	5' 7"	1st	Vaughan Secondary School	Rookie
SF	17	(Philippines)	Jose Carlos Escalambre	6' 2"	3rd	San Sebastian College-Recoletos	Transferred from Adamson University
SF	18	(Philippines)	Leon Alfonzo Lorenzana	6' 4"	1st	University of Santo Tomas	Rookie
PF	19	(Philippines)	Christian Laurent Garcia	6' 4"	3rd	Arellano University High School	Transferred from Adamson University
PF	20	(Philippines)	Vaughn Jorem Soriano	6' 4"	1st	University of Santo Tomas	Promoted from Team B

== Coaching staff ==
Boy Sablan went into his second year as the head coach of the Growling Tigers after signing a one-year contract extension in June 2017.

Former PBA players Gerry Esplana and Bobby Jose replaced Patrick Fran and Rabbi Tomacruz as assistant coaches going into Season 80.

Esplana, who was a former player of the FEU Tamaraws was the head coach of the Emilio Aguinaldo College Generals from 2011 until 2014, while the former Glowing Goldie Bobby Jose is an aspiring public servant in his hometown of Bocaue, Bulacan. Both of them have children who also play basketball for the varsity teams of their respective schools.

== Ineligibility issues ==
Steve Akomo became the subject of an eligibility probe in September 2017. In the days leading to the opening of the Season 80 men's basketball tournament, the UAAP board had insisted that Akomo needed two years for his transfer residency. He had transferred from the University of the Visayas and did his residency last season. They had cited the case of Ben Mbala, the Cameroonian player of La Salle who underwent two years of residency when he transferred from the Southwestern University in 2013. Sablan countered that former Growling Tiger and fellow Cameroonian Karim Abdul only did one year of residency before he was allowed to play for the team in 2011.

In spite of the Republic Act 10676, or the Student-Athletes Protection Act of 2015, a law that put an end to the Jerie Pingoy Rule, or the 2013 UAAP rule which required two years of residency for all incoming collegiate athletes who wished to transfer from another UAAP member university, there appears to be another existing rule specifically made for foreign student-athletes. If the foreign student has attended high school in the Philippines for at least one school year, then he only has to do one year of residency. If he studied for two years, he could play already in college. Otherwise, the two-year residency requirement remains.

While the league's Board of Managing Directors had recommended Akomo, together with UP Fighting Maroon Ibrahim Ouattara to be ruled ineligible for the season's upcoming tournament, the UAAP Board of Trustees, the official policy-making body made up of the presidents of all-member schools had a meeting at FEU on September 7, 2017 and arrived at a decision "in the interest of justice and fairness," to allow both foreigners to play with finality.

== Injuries ==
Steve Akoma and Jordan Sta. Ana missed the game against FEU in the second round as Akomo was saddled with the flu, while Sta. Ana had a shoulder injury that he suffered in practice prior to the said match.

== Close calls ==
The Growling Tigers on numerous occasions had chances to steal wins from their higher-ranked opponents, but either turnovers, poor free throws, or simply, bad breaks almost always did them in. Against the UP Fighting Maroons in the first round, UST lost by a single point, on a game-winning three point shot by Paul Desiderio during the last 5 seconds. This was when the iconic "Atin 'to, papasok ito" quote was first mentioned by the Fighting Maroons' captain. They lost again to UP in the second round, with a similar disappointing outcome. UST came to within 2 points with 9 seconds left, but team captain Marvin Lee missed a last-second heave, causing the team to lose for the eighth straight time.

Against the Adamson Falcons in the second round, the Tigers came to within 2 with 14 seconds left in the game, but fouls got the better of them. Fil-American guard Jerrick Ahanmisi converted his free throws for the final score of 70–75.

In their only win of the season against UE on their last scheduled game, the Tigers had to rely on perfect free throw shooting by second-year point guard Oli de Guzman to bail them to the final score of 88–85.

In their first-round game against Adamson, UST committed 41 turnovers, the most by any team in a single game since 2003, when record-keeping of UAAP statistics first became official.

== Last man standing ==
Having the reputation as being one of the most passionate sports fans in the country, the UST community's absence in the gallery became more noticeable as the crowd dwindled down to around fifty people that included the school's drummers and cheering squad. This absence was emphasized on October 25 after the Tigers lost their 11th straight game of the season, cameras were focused on a lone UST student at the stands singing their school hymn. This particular report awakened the community as students trooped back to the Araneta Coliseum in support of the team on the last playing game of the season on November 12. The iconic "Go USTe!" chant was once again heard for the first time after three months.

== Schedule and results ==
=== Preseason tournaments ===
The Filoil Flying V Preseason games were not aired on television for the first time in the tournament's history after the organizers' partnership with ABS-CBN Sports had ended.

Preseason game log

2017 Republica Cup–Collegiate Division: 5–2
Game	Date • Time	Opponent	Result	Record	High points	High rebounds	High assists	Location
1	Mar 1	Arellano Chiefs	W 116–109^{OT}	1–0	Akomo (26)			Malolos Sports and Convention Center Bulacan
2	Mar 9	Diliman College Blue Dragons	W 78–61	2–0	Arana (16)			Malolos Sports and Convention Center Bulacan
3	Mar 12	BulSU Gold Gears	W 122–99	3–0	Huang (27)			Malolos Sports and Convention Center Bulacan
4	Mar 19	UP Fighting Maroons	L 68–78	3–1	Lee (15)			Baliuag Star Arena Bulacan
5	Mar 21	AMA University Titans	W 98–84	4–1	Akomo (18)			Malolos Sports and Convention Center Bulacan
6	Mar 26	Diliman College Blue Dragons	W 68–60	5–1	Lee (21)			Malolos Sports and Convention Center Bulacan
7	Apr 9	UP Fighting Maroons; Championship game	L 91–100	5–2	Lee (23)			Malolos Sports and Convention Center Bulacan

11th Filoil Flying V Preseason Premier Cup: 1–7
Game	Date • Time	Opponent	Result	Record	High points	High rebounds	High assists	Location
1	May 5 • 5:00 pm	Ateneo Blue Eagles	L 72–89	0–1	Sta. Ana (11)			Filoil Flying V Centre San Juan
2	May 10 • 3:15 pm	UE Red Warriors	L 67–80	0–2	Akomo (14)			Filoil Flying V Centre San Juan
3	May 14 • 5:00 pm	De La Salle Green Archers	L 81–109	0–3	Lee (18)			Filoil Flying V Centre San Juan
4	May 21 • 3:15 pm	Perpetual Altas	W 63–55	1–3	Akomo (11)			Filoil Flying V Centre San Juan
5	May 28 • 11:15 am	JRU Heavy Bombers	L 55–64	1–4	De Guzman (17)			Filoil Flying V Centre San Juan
6	Jun 2 • 3:15 pm	Letran Knights	L 90–95	1–5	Basibas (16)			Filoil Flying V Centre San Juan
7	Jun 4 • 5:00 pm	San Beda Red Lions	L 59–86	1–6	Faundo (14)			Filoil Flying V Centre San Juan
8	Jun 12 • 1:30 pm	Lyceum Pirates	L 88–127	1–7	Faundo (17)			Filoil Flying V Centre San Juan

7th Kim Lope Asis Invitational: 3–2
Game	Date • Time	Opponent	Result	Record	High points	High rebounds	High assists	Location
1	Jun 27 • 7:00 pm	EAC Generals	W 85–74	1–0	Macasaet (25)			Lope Asis Memorial Gymnasium Bayugan
2	Jun 28 • 10:30 am	Xavier University Crusaders	W 92–56	2–0				Lope Asis Memorial Gymnasium Bayugan
3	Jun 28 • 8:30 pm	UV Green Lancers	W 83–82	3–0	Lee (19)			Lope Asis Memorial Gymnasium Bayugan
4	Jun 29 • 9:00 am	USPF Panthers	L 80–88	3–1	Lee (19)			Lope Asis Memorial Gymnasium Bayugan
5	Jun 29 • 7:00 pm	UV Green Lancers; Championship game	L 89–90	3–2	Sta. Ana (18)			Lope Asis Memorial Gymnasium Bayugan

32nd Kadayawan Basketball Invitational: 3–1
Game	Date • Time	Opponent	Result	Record	High points	High rebounds	High assists	Location
1	Aug 24 • 5:00 pm	De La Salle Green Archers	L 88–93	0–1	Faundo (15)			Davao City Recreation Center
2	Aug 25 • 5:00 pm	Davao City All-Stars	W 100–89	1–1				Davao City Recreation Center
3 (Note: Won by forfeit) (Note: A bench-clearing brawl caused La Salle and FEU to be disqualified from the tournament)	Aug 26 • 7:00 pm	FEU Tamaraws	W	2–1				Davao City Recreation Center
4	Aug 27 • 7:00 pm	Davao City All-Stars; Championship game	W 87–76	3–1	Basibas (19)			USeP Gymnasium Davao City

(#) Tournament seedings in parentheses.
All times are in UTC+08:00.

=== UAAP games ===
Elimination games were played in a double round-robin format and all of UST's games were televised on ABS-CBN Sports and Action and Balls.

UAAP Season 80 game log

Elimination round: 1–13
Game	Date • Time	Opponent	Result	Record	High points	High rebounds	High assists	Location
1	Sep 10 • 2:00 pm	UP Fighting Maroons	L 73–74	0–1	Lee (20)	Akomo (14)	Sta. Ana (6)	Mall of Asia Arena Pasay
2	Sep 16 • 4:00 pm	Adamson Soaring Falcons	L 81–88	0–2	Tied (14)	Akomo (15)	Sta. Ana (6)	Smart Araneta Coliseum Quezon City
3	Sep 20 • 2:00 pm	NU Bulldogs	L 84–94	0–3	Sta. Ana (14)	Akomo (10)	Lee (5)	Mall of Asia Arena Pasay
4	Sep 23 • 2:00 pm	FEU Tamaraws	L 65–78	0–4	Faundo (16)	Faundo (11)	Tied (2)	Mall of Asia Arena Pasay
5	Sep 27 • 4:00 pm	Ateneo Blue Eagles	L 84–94	0–5	Sta. Ana (21)	Akomo (9)	Sta. Ana (5)	Smart Araneta Coliseum Quezon City
6	Sep 30 • 2:00 pm	De La Salle Green Archers	L 86–115	0–6	Akomo (15)	Akomo (13)	Lee (6)	Smart Araneta Coliseum Quezon City
7	Oct 7 • 2:00 pm	UE Red Warriors; End of R1 of eliminations	L 91–96	0–7	Lee (20)	Akomo (18)	Sta. Ana (5)	Mall of Asia Arena Pasay
8	Oct 11 • 2:00 pm	UP Fighting Maroons	L 69–71	0–8	Soriano (14)	Akomo (20)	Sta. Ana (4)	Smart Araneta Coliseum Quezon City
9	Oct 15 • 12:00 pm	FEU Tamaraws	L 70–96	0–9	Tied (17)	Faundo (13)	De Guzman (6)	Filoil Flying V Centre San Juan
10	Oct 22 • 2:00 pm	NU Bulldogs	L 83–91	0–10	Lee (15)	Tied (6)	De Guzman (6)	Filoil Flying V Centre San Juan
11	Oct 25 • 4:00 pm	Adamson Soaring Falcons	L 70–75	0–11	Basibas (17)	Akomo (17)	Tied (3)	Mall of Asia Arena Pasay
12	Oct 29 • 2:00 pm	De La Salle Green Archers	L 59–94	0–12	Lee (25)	Akomo (10)	Sta. Ana (5)	Smart Araneta Coliseum Quezon City
13	Nov 4 • 2:00 pm	Ateneo Blue Eagles	L 83–102	0–13	Tied (12)	Faundo (12)	Sta. Ana (5)	Smart Araneta Coliseum Quezon City
14	Nov 12 • 12:00 pm	UE Red Warriors; End of R2 of eliminations	W 88–85	1–13	Basibas (21)	Akomo (20)	Basibas (4)	Smart Araneta Coliseum Quezon City

(#) Tournament seedings in parentheses.
All times are in UTC+08:00.
Source: HumbleBola

== UAAP statistics ==
Player	GP	GS	MPG	FGM	FGA	FG%	3PM	3PA	3P%	FTM	FTA	FT%	RPG	APG	SPG	BPG	TOV	PPG
Steve Akomo	12	10	27.3	52	104	50.0	0	4	0.0	33	69	47.8	13.2	1.7	0.9	2.5	3.8	11.4
Marvin Lee	12	6	26.0	50	118	42.4	17	51	33.3	19	23	82.6	3.3	2.9	1.3	0.1	4.4	11.3
Jordan Sta. Ana	13	11	25.1	60	129	46.5	0	1	0.0	24	57	42.1	2.4	4.3	0.8	0.0	3.6	11.1
Jeepy Faundo	13	3	19.7	41	97	42.3	0	1	0.0	23	36	63.9	8.2	0.4	0.3	0.5	1.2	8.1
Regie Boy Basibas	11	9	15.6	31	73	42.5	2	10	20.0	17	25	68.0	3.7	0.9	0.5	0.2	2.1	7.4
Oli de Guzman	12	6	17.6	29	91	31.9	5	28	17.9	3	6	50.0	2.4	2.1	0.1	0.0	2.0	5.5
Enric Caunan	13	6	13.0	29	50	58.0	0	0	0.0	1	6	16.7	4.0	0.6	0.1	0.6	1.1	4.5
Justin Arana	6	2	8.6	7	18	38.9	0	0	0.0	8	14	57.1	3.5	0.3	0.2	0.2	0.3	3.7
Carlo Escalambre	12	2	9.5	17	56	30.4	7	32	21.9	2	7	28.6	1.1	0.4	0.2	0.1	0.8	3.6
Zach Huang	11	3	9.3	13	37	35.1	0	0	0.0	8	15	53.3	1.9	0.2	0.5	0.0	1.5	3.1
Jorem Soriano	12	2	9.6	8	23	34.8	2	5	40.0	13	22	59.1	1.9	0.6	0.1	0.2	1.1	2.6
Christian Garcia	11	0	9.9	11	33	33.3	2	8	25.0	5	7	71.4	3.3	1.4	0.2	0.2	1.9	2.6
Joco Macasaet	13	4	12.3	12	36	33.3	0	3	0.0	6	8	75.0	2.8	0.8	0.0	0.5	0.5	2.3
MR Romero	12	2	9.6	8	18	44.4	0	0	0.0	2	3	66.7	1.3	0.3	0.1	0.2	1.0	1.5
Onzo Lorenzana	5	2	3.9	1	4	25.0	1	4	25.0	2	2	100.0	1.2	0.2	0.0	0.0	1.2	1.0
Ben Kwawukumey	11	1	4.9	5	14	35.7	0	0	0.0	0	0	0.0	0.7	0.1	0.2	0.0	1.1	0.9
Total	14		40.0	374	901	41.5	36	148	24.3	166	300	55.3	45.9	14.7	4.4	4.4	23.4	67.9
Opponents	14		40.0	415	982	42.3	101	306	33.0	188	270	69.6	40.4	19.5	9.4	4.4	15.5	79.9

Legend
GP	Games played	GS	Games started	MPG	Minutes per game
FGM	Field-goal made	FGA	Field-goal attempts	FG%	Field-goal percentage
3PM	3-point field-goal made	3PA	3-point field-goal attempts	3P%	3-point field-goal percentage
FTM	Free-throw made	FTA	Free-throw attempts	FT%	Free-throw percentage
RPG	Rebounds per game	APG	Assists per game	SPG	Steals per game
BPG	Blocks per game	TOV	Turnovers per game	PPG	Points per game

Source: HumbleBola

== Aftermath ==
Boy Sablan tendered his resignation as the team's head coach on November 20, 2017. UST Rector Fr. Herminio Dagohoy announced that the entire coaching staff's tenure was to end on November 30, but they will continue receiving compensations until May of the following year due to existing live contracts. The Tigresses assistant coach Arsenio Dysangco Jr. was tasked to facilitate team practices as the school was finalizing the process for selecting the Growling Tigers' next coach.

Former head coach Pido Jarencio once again expressed interest in coming back to lead the team, but there was someone else who was being considered for the position. On January 5, 2018, Aldin Ayo, resigned coach of the De La Salle Green Archers, announced his transfer to UST where he will coach the men's basketball team for the next six years. Ayo's appointment was made formal by Institute of Physical Education and Athletics (IPEA) director Fr. Jannel Abogado on January 11.

== Awards ==
Name	Award	Date	Ref.
Team	Republica Cup runners-up	9 Apr 2017	
Team	Kim Lope Asis Invitational runners-up	29 Jun 2017	
Team	Kadayawan Invitational champions	27 Aug 2017	
Marvin Lee	Kadayawan Invitational MVP	27 Aug 2017	

== Players drafted into the PBA ==
Jeepy Faundo was picked 15th overall in the second round of the 2018 PBA draft by the Chito Victolero-led Magnolia Hotshots team on December 16, 2018. Regie Boy Basibas, meanwhile applied for the record 124-strong 2023 PBA draft and ended up as the last pick of the night, with the Bonnie Tan-coached NorthPort Batang Pier team selecting him in the eleventh round for the draft's 79th pick on September 17, 2023.

Year	Round	Pick	Overall	Player	PBA team
2018	2	3	15	Jeepy Faundo	Magnolia Hotshots
2023	11	1	79	Regie Boy Basibas	NorthPort Batang Pier
