= 2016 UST Growling Tigers basketball team =

2016 UST Growling Tigers men's basketball

Record
- Elims rank: #8
- Final rank: #8
- 2016 record: 3–11
- Head coach: Boy Sablan (1st season)
- Assistant coaches: Tylon Dar Juan; Bam Ledesma
- Captain: Louie Vigil (5th season)

The 2016 UST Growling Tigers men's basketball team represented University of Santo Tomas in the 79th season of the University Athletic Association of the Philippines. The men's basketball tournament for the school year 2016–17 began on September 4, 2016, and the host school for the season was also UST.

The Tigers finished eighth and last at the end of the double round-robin eliminations, winning three games against eleven losses. It was the most number of losses in a season for the Growling Tigers since the Final Four format began in 1993.

They had an average winning margin of 3.7 points and an average losing margin of 16.2 points. Three of their losses were by blowouts, once to the Adamson Falcons in the first round by 27 points, and twice to the De La Salle Green Archers by 38 and 43 points respectively.

Second-year guard Marvin Lee was chosen Player of the Week by the UAAP Press Corps in the second round of eliminations for the duration of October 12–16.

== Roster ==
UST Growling Tigers roster
Players
Coaches

Pos.	No.	Nat.	Name	Height	Year	High School
PF	5	(Philippines)	Regie Boy Basibas	6'3" (1.91m)	2nd	Arellano University High School
PG	6	(Canada)	Sheak Jamil Sheriff, Jr.	5'9" (1.75m)	5th	Loyola Catholic Secondary School
PF	7	(Philippines)	Jason Strait	6'4" (1.93m)	1st	Arellano University High School
SG	8	(Philippines)	Oliver Wendell de Guzman	5'8" (1.73m)	1st	Nazareth School of National University
SG	9	(Philippines)	Dean Marvin Lee	5'8" (1.73m)	2nd	Far Eastern University–Diliman
PG	10	(Philippines)	Henri Lorenzo Subido	5'9" (1.75m)	3rd	De La Salle Santiago Zobel School
SF	11	(Philippines)	Enrique Caunan, Jr.	6'5" (1.96m)	2nd	Colegio de San Juan de Letran
PF	12	(Philippines)	Jon Cornelius Macasaet	6'3" (1.91m)	2nd	San Sebastian College-Recoletos
PF	13	(Philippines)	Zachary Lance Eden Huang	6'4" (1.93m)	2nd	Sacred Heart School–Ateneo de Cebu
SG	14	(Philippines)	Mario Emmanuel Bonleon, Jr. (injured)	6'3" (1.91m)	2nd	La Salle Greenhills
C	15	(Philippines)	Jeepy Faundo	6'6" (1.98m)	4th	José Rizal University
PF	16	(Philippines)	Justin Arana	6'5" (1.96m)	2nd	Basud National High School
C	17	(Ghana)	William Kwabena Afoakwah	6'6" (1.98m)	1st	Ideal College Senior High School
SG	18	(Philippines)	Louie Philippe Vigil (C)	6'3" (1.91m)	5th	José Rizal University
SF	19	(Philippines)	Kent Jefferson Lao	6'4" (1.93m)	5th	Saint Stephen's High School
C	20	(Japan)	Tsutomu Tateishi	6'9" (2.06m)	1st	Ateneo de Davao University

Head coach

- (Philippines) Rodil Sablan

Assistant coach(es)

- Tylon Filipe Dar Juan
- Juben Ledesma
- Ma. Genevieve Francisco
- Patrick Roy Fran
- Julian Rabbi Tomacruz

Strength & conditioning coach(es)

- John Oswald Aquino
- Kris Anthony Agarao

Legend

- (C) Team captain
- Injured

- Roster

=== Depth chart ===
Pos.	Starting 5	Bench 1	Bench 2
C	Afoakwah	Faundo	Tateishi
PF	Huang	Macasaet	Arana
SF	Lao	Caunan	Strait
SG	Vigil	Lee	Basibas
PG	Sheriff	Subido	De Guzman

== Roster changes ==
=== Subtractions ===
Pos.	No.	Nat.	Player	Height	Year	High school	Notes
SG	5	(Philippines)	Janus Kyle Christian Suarez	6' 2"	3rd	Ateneo de Manila	Out due to ACL injury
PF	7	(Philippines)	Kevin Ferrer	6' 4"	5th	University of Santo Tomas	Graduated
SG	8	(Philippines)	Eduardo Daquioag, Jr.	6' 1"	5th	RTU Laboratory High School	Graduated
PG	10	(Philippines)	Osama Said Abdurasad	5' 10"	2nd	Kaunlaran High School	Transferred to Arellano University
PG	12	(Philippines)	Janrey Garrido	5' 6"	3rd	Hope Christian High School	Out due to hamstring injury
C	20	(Cameroon)	Karim Abdul	6' 6"	5th	Sta. Clara International Academy	Graduated

=== Additions ===
Pos.	No.	Nat.	Player	Height	Year	High school	Notes
PF	5	(Philippines)	Regie Boy Basibas	6' 3"	2nd	Arellano University High School	Returning from Season 77
PF	7	(Philippines)	Jason Strait	6' 4"	1st	Arellano University High School	Rookie
SG	8	(Philippines)	Oliver Wendell de Guzman	5' 8"	1st	Nazareth School of National University	Rookie
PF	12	(Philippines)	Jon Cornelius Macasaet	6' 3"	2nd	San Sebastian College-Recoletos	Returning from Season 77
C	17	(Ghana)	William Kwabena Afoakwah	6' 6"	1st	Ideal College Senior High School	Transferred from De La Salle University
C	20	(Japan)	Tsutomu Tateishi	6' 9"	1st	Ateneo de Davao University	Promoted from Team B

== Coaching changes ==
Boy Sablan replaced Bong dela Cruz as the Tigers' head coach following controversies surrounding the latter. Almost two months after falling short of winning the championship against the FEU Tamaraws in Season 78's Finals series, Dela Cruz became the subject of an administrative investigation stemming from complaints of physical and verbal abuse that he allegedly made against some of the players in the roster.

Short of calling it a preventive suspension, the Institute of Physical Education and Athletics (IPEA) has ordered the coach to recuse himself from team activities until a decision on his tenure was reached based on would-be findings from the investigations. As a result, Dela Cruz stopped attending team practices beginning January 25, 2016.

Rumors surfaced that former Growling Tiger Bal David was among those who were being considered to replace Dela Cruz, but eventually, it was Sablan who was selected to be the new coach in late May where he signed a one-year contract for the upcoming Season 79 basketball tournament.

Sablan was a Glowing Goldies teammate of former coach Pido Jarencio in the 1980s and also served as one of his deputies from 2006 until 2013.

=== Coaching staff ===
Appointed as Sablan's deputies were Tylon Dar Juan, Bam Ledesma, Gina Francisco, Patrick Fran, Rabbi Tomacruz, John Aquino, and Kris Anthony Agarao.

- Dar Juan was the coach of the Arellano Braves in the NCAA. He was also a member of the coaching staff of the Blackwater Elite team in the PBA alongside Sablan.
- Ledesma was a member of the coaching staff of the Tigresses basketball team.
- Francisco was UST's team captain of the women's basketball team in the 1980s and has been a long-time assistant coach of the men's basketball team.
- Fran, a former Growling Tiger and PBA player, was as a member of the coaching staff at the Meralco Bolts in the PBA.
- Tomacruz, who was also a former Glowing Goldie and PBA player also served as Jarencio's assistant coach.
- Aquino has been the strength and conditioning coach of the Meralco Bolts in the PBA since 2010.
- Agarao has been the strength and conditioning coach of the Growling Tigers since 2012.

== Ineligibility issues ==
Before the start of the season, the UAAP came out with a new ruling that would lower the age limit of student-athletes from the previously accepted 25 years to 24 years. This would mean that two of the three graduating Growling Tigers would be considered over aged for the upcoming UAAP tournament. Team captain Louie Vigil, Fil-Canadian point guard Jon Sheriff and forward Kent Lao were on their final playing year in the Tigers roster, but only Vigil and Sheriff would be affected by the new rule. Sheriff turned 25 on July 31, while Vigil would be the same age on September 26.

Vigil was already considering signing up for the PBA rookie draft in October when the UAAP decided to defer implementation of the said rule. Protests lodged by concerned schools and affected athletes were instrumental in the reversion of the age eligibility rules. This was announced after the UAAP board of trustees convened in their annual planning session in Spain.

== Injuries ==
Mario Bonleon suffered a season-ending wrist injury during their September 14 game against La Salle in the first round of eliminations.

== Schedule and results ==
=== Preseason tournaments ===
Preseason game log

2016 Got Skills U25 Summer Showcase: 2–2
Game	Date • Time	Opponent	Result	Record	High points	High rebounds	High assists	Location
1	Apr 19	NU Bulldogs	L 49–56	0–1	Vigil (18)			Enderun Colleges Gym, Taguig
2	Apr 27	Enderun Colleges Titans	L 53–60	0–2	Lao (12)			Enderun Colleges Gym, Taguig
3	May 12	Lyceum Pirates	W 62–33	1–2	Lee (14)			Enderun Colleges Gym, Taguig
4	May 14	FEU Tamaraws	W 50–42	2–2	Subido (13)			Enderun Colleges Gym, Taguig

1st Recoletos de Cebu Invitational Cup: 3–1
Game	Date • Time	Opponent	Result	Record	High points	High rebounds	High assists	Location
1	Jul 14 • 2:00 pm	USJ–R Jaguars	W 73–60	1–0	Vigil (12)			Recoletos Coliseum–Basak, Cebu City
2	Jul 15 • 2:00 pm	UV Green Lancers	W 84–48	2–0	Bonleon (15)			Recoletos Coliseum–Basak, Cebu City
3	Jul 16 • 4:00 pm	USC Warriors	W 63–58	3–0	Subido (10)			Recoletos Coliseum–Basak, Cebu City
3	Jul 17 • 4:00 pm	USJ–R Jaguars; Championship game	L 86–89	3–1	Vigil (20)			Recoletos Coliseum–Basak, Cebu City

Buddha Light International Association Cup: 0–3
Game	Date • Time	Opponent	Result	Record	High points	High rebounds	High assists	Location
1	Aug 17	Hsing Wu University	L	0–1				Kaohsiung Arena; Taiwan
2	Aug 18	University of Tsukuba	L	0–2				Kaohsiung Arena; Taiwan
3	Aug 19	McMaster Marauders	L 70–93	0–3				Kaohsiung Arena; Taiwan

(#) Tournament seedings in parentheses.
All times are in UTC+08:00.

=== UAAP games ===
Elimination games were played in a double round-robin format and all of UST's games were televised on ABS-CBN Sports and Action and Balls.

UAAP Season 79 game log

Elimination round: 3–11
Game	Date • Time	Opponent	Result	Record	High points	High rebounds	High assists	Location
1	Sep 4 • 4:00 pm	Ateneo Blue Eagles	L 69–73	0–1	Vigil (21)	Tied (9)	Subido (6)	Smart Araneta Coliseum; Quezon City
2	Sep 10 • 2:00 pm	UE Red Warriors	W 88–87	1–1	Subido (26)	Macasaet (10)	Sheriff (4)	Smart Araneta Coliseum; Quezon City
3	Sep 14 • 4:00 pm	De La Salle Green Archers	L 62–100	1–2	Subido (18)	Afoakwah (10)	Subido (4)	Mall of Asia Arena; Pasay
4	Sep 17 • 2:00 pm	UP Fighting Maroons	W 83–77	2–2	Vigil (18)	Faundo (9)	Vigil (7)	Smart Araneta Coliseum; Quezon City
5	Sep 25 • 4:00 pm	NU Bulldogs	L 68–75	2–3	Sheriff (16)	Afoakwah (15)	Tied (2)	Mall of Asia Arena; Pasay
6	Oct 1 • 4:00 pm	FEU Tamaraws	L 72–79	2–4	Vigil (16)	Basibas (8)	Lee (5)	Mall of Asia Arena; Pasay
7	Oct 5 • 2:00 pm	Adamson Soaring Falcons; End of R1 of eliminations	L 52–79	2–5	Lao (13)	Afoakwah (12)	Tied (3)	Mall of Asia Arena; Pasay
8	Oct 8 • 2:00 pm	UE Red Warriors	L 61–71	2–6	Vigil (21)	Afoakwah (21)	Sheriff (4)	Mall of Asia Arena; Pasay
9	Oct 12 • 4:00 pm	FEU Tamaraws	L 48–59	2–7	Vigil (18)	Faundo (17)	Tied (2)	Mall of Asia Arena; Pasay
10	Oct 15 • 4:00 pm	NU Bulldogs	W 73–69	3–7	Lee (22)	Afoakwah (13)	Vigil (5)	Smart Araneta Coliseum; Quezon City
11	Oct 23 • 2:00 pm	De La Salle Green Archers	L 56–99	3–8	Vigil (18)	Afoakwah (11)	Vigil (3)	Smart Araneta Coliseum; Quezon City
12	Nov 6 • 4:00 pm	UP Fighting Maroons	L 69–74	3–9	Vigil (16)	Faundo (14)	Sheriff (4)	Filoil Flying V Centre; San Juan
13	Nov 9 • 4:00 pm	Adamson Soaring Falcons	L 61–76	3–10	Sheriff (13)	Faundo (9)	Tied (2)	Mall of Asia Arena; Pasay
14	Nov 12 • 2:00 pm	Ateneo Blue Eagles; End of R2 of eliminations	L 64–74	3–11	Vigil (14)	Tied (7)	Lee (5)	Mall of Asia Arena; Pasay

(#) Tournament seedings in parentheses.
All times are in UTC+08:00.
Source: HumbleBola

== UAAP statistics ==
Player	GP	GS	MPG	FGM	FGA	FG%	3PM	3PA	3P%	FTM	FTA	FT%	RPG	APG	SPG	BPG	TOV	PPG
Louie Vigil	14	12	26.7	78	199	39.2	7	47	14.9	45	70	64.3	4.9	2.9	0.8	0.5	4.4	14.9
Jon Sheriff	14	12	22.5	57	124	46.0	2	3	66.7	8	13	61.5	3.5	2.6	1.7	0.0	2.1	8.9
Jeepy Faundo	13	3	19.7	25	64	39.1	0	0	0.0	22	42	52.4	8.2	0.4	0.3	0.5	1.2	8.1
Marvin Lee	14	3	18.9	39	125	31.2	14	59	23.7	18	20	90.0	2.6	1.7	0.5	0.1	2.1	7.9
Renzo Subido	14	2	16.3	29	93	31.2	8	38	21.1	28	41	68.3	1.6	1.4	0.6	0.0	2.4	6.7
Regie Boy Basibas	12	3	13.6	23	72	31.9	1	14	7.1	16	26	61.5	4.2	0.9	0.2	0.2	1.9	5.3
Kent Lao	14	8	20.2	21	83	25.3	8	37	21.6	22	32	68.8	3.2	0.2	0.2	0.1	1.7	5.1
Mario Bonleon	3	0	8.3	6	15	40.0	2	4	50.0	0	0	0.0	0.7	0.3	0.0	0.0	1.0	4.7
Joco Macasaet	14	3	12.2	18	42	42.9	0	0	0.0	10	15	66.7	3.1	0.2	0.1	0.2	0.9	3.3
Zach Huang	14	7	9.9	11	28	39.3	0	1	0.0	15	26	57.7	2.2	0.6	0.1	0.2	1.3	2.6
William Afoakwah	14	11	19.9	12	41	29.3	0	0	0.0	9	17	52.9	8.8	0.3	0.3	0.9	1.8	2.4
Oli de Guzman	14	1	6.6	10	30	33.4	4	13	30.8	5	6	83.3	1.0	0.4	0.0	0.0	0.9	2.1
Justin Arana	8	1	7.1	4	13	30.8	0	0	0.0	4	8	50.0	1.3	0.3	0.1	0.0	1.3	1.5
Enric Caunan	8	1	6.4	4	10	40.0	0	0	0.0	2	2	100.0	1.5	0.1	0.0	0.1	0.6	1.3
Teshi Tateishi	2	0	6.7	0	1	0.0	0	0	0.0	0	0	0.0	0.0	0.5	0.0	1.0	0.5	0.0
Jason Strait	0	0	0.0	0	0	0.0	0	0	0.0	0	0	0.0	0.0	0.0	0.0	0.0	0.0	0.0
Total	14		40.0	337	940	35.9	46	216	21.3	204	318	64.2	45.2	11.6	4.6	2.6	23.3	66.1
Opponents	14		40.0	395	997	39.6	79	302	26.2	223	324	68.8	46.8	16.5	6.5	5.5	19.5	72.4

Legend
GP	Games played	GS	Games started	MPG	Minutes per game
FGM	Field-goal made	FGA	Field-goal attempts	FG%	Field-goal percentage
3PM	3-point field-goal made	3PA	3-point field-goal attempts	3P%	3-point field-goal percentage
FTM	Free-throw made	FTA	Free-throw attempts	FT%	Free-throw percentage
RPG	Rebounds per game	APG	Assists per game	SPG	Steals per game
BPG	Blocks per game	TOV	Turnovers per game	PPG	Points per game

Source: HumbleBola

== Aftermath ==
The future

Reeling from one of their worst finishes in the UAAP, the UST community anticipated Steve Akomo's debut to strengthen the roster. The Cameroonian center established himself as a reliable reinforcement when he led the University of the Visayas to the CESAFI Finals in 2012 against Ben Mbala who was then playing for Southwestern University.

During the Adamson–UST postgame interview at the MOA Arena last November 9, UST Coach Boy Sablan introduced Akomo to the press as the go-to guy for the Tigers alongside Joco Macasaet, Zach Huang and Regie Boy Basibas in their UAAP campaign for the next season. Macasaet, Huang, and Basibas, who were all in their second playing year, started the game for UST against the Falcons, while the veteran group of Louie Vigil, Kent Lao, Marvin Lee and Renzo Subido were benched, allegedly for disciplinary reasons. Sablan justified the action by saying that he was giving the fans a preview of the Tigers' future brand of basketball, in reference to the trio and Akomo.

The past

Former head coach Pido Jarencio, who gave the Tigers the 2006 UAAP title and a back-to-back Finals appearances in 2012 and 2013 had indirectly given the UST community a glimmer of hope when he sent out a controversial tweet from his social media account on December 6. The message reads, "I am just a call away," and a follow-up tweet had Jarencio exclaiming, "let's bring back the glory!"

Fans were quick to attribute his messages to the dismal performance of the team in the tournament, which was quite the opposite of their Finals run the previous year. Jarencio later confirmed in interviews that he was actually willing to come back to coach the team on two conditions, "if the position for head coach became vacant and if the management," and "if the UST community wanted him back." Jarencio resigned as UST's head coach in January 2014 in exchange for a coaching job in the PBA.

Departure of key players

On May 4, Renzo Subido announced on Twitter his plan to skip the upcoming Season 80 tournament. He explained how he was dissatisfied with the way that he has played during the course of his three-year college career. He also added that he planned to join the PBA D-League where he was hoping to improve his skills. A week later, Mario Bonleon made a similar tweet about taking time off from the team. On May 11, he had cited experiencing burnout as one of the reasons for wanting to leave the team. He also expressed his intention to join a D-League team during his time away from the Tigers.

Rumored dissatisfaction with the coach

The Growling Tigers joined the 2017 Filoil Flying V Preseason Premier Cup in the summer, but failed to make it past the elimination round compiling only a single win against seven losses. This was highlighted by a 39-point loss to the Lyceum Pirates. Because of the Tigers' poor showing, various reports began to circulate about some players' growing dissatisfaction with their head coach, which resulted to speculations that Sablan was on his way out as the team's chief tactician.

Sablan, whose one-year contract expired on May 31, 2017, denied rumors of his replacement, pointing out that there was not much time left for a new coach to prepare the team in time for the September 9 tournament opening. Dar Juan and incoming team captain Marvin Lee have also come out to Sablan's defense. Lee denied the report that some of his teammates wanted to leave the team by explaining that the players were given permission by the coaching staff to go on leave. He was referring to Regie Boy Basibas, Zach Huang, and Joco Macasaet who were all absent during the game against the San Beda Red Lions. Dar Juan, on the other hand told reporters that Sablan was not in physical shape to coach the team after going through surgery, but added that the head coach was actually present during the May 21 game against the Letran Knights. Sablan had undergone surgery on his gallbladder on May 15 and was unable to coach the team during the tournament. Assistant coaches Tylon Dar Juan and Bam Ledesma took over practices and coaching duties.

According to a tweet from former Varsitarian sports editor Alex Cerado on June 20, Sablan's contract has been renewed for another year.

== Awards ==
Name	Award	Date	Ref.
Louie Vigil	Kopiko 78's Recharged Player	7 Dec 2016	
Marvin Lee	Player of the Week	12–16 Oct 2016	

== Players drafted into the PBA ==
Louie Vigil was picked 17th overall in the second round of the 2017 PBA draft by the Leo Austria-led San Miguel Beermen on October 29, 2017. Kent Lao, meanwhile applied for the draft the following year and was selected in the third round by the Caloy Garcia-coached Rain or Shine Elasto Painters as the 30th overall pick in the 2018 PBA draft on December 16, 2018.

Year	Round	Pick	Overall	Player	PBA team
2017	2	5	17	Louie Vigil	San Miguel Beermen
2018	3	8	30	Kent Lao	Rain or Shine Elasto Painters
