= Boy Sablan =

Filipino basketball coach (born 1963/1964)

Personal information
- Born: 1963/1964

Career information
- College: UST
- Coaching career: 2006–2017

Career history

Coaching
- 2006–2013: UST (assistant)
- 2014–2018: Blackwater Bossing (assistant)
- 2016–2017: UST

Career highlights
- As assistant coach: UAAP champion (2006); PCCL champion (2012)

Rodil "Boy" Sablan is a Filipino former professional basketball coach.

== Career ==
A UST alumnus, Sablan started his career at UST Growling Tigers as an assistant coach for player academics under his former college teammate Pido Jarencio. He also became an assistant coach under Leo Isaac.

He became the head coach of UST in 2016. But due to two seasons of dismal performances, he was later replaced by Aldin Ayo. In the middle of Sablan's tenure as head coach, some Wikipedians replaced Sablan's name into Boy Sablay (sablay means fail in Tagalog) in the UST Growling Tigers basketball page.

== Coaching record ==
Season	Team	Elimination round					Playoffs				
Season	Team	GP	W	L	PCT	Finish	PG	W	L	PCT	Results
2016	UST	14	3	11	.214	8th	–	–	–	–	Eliminated
2017	UST	14	1	13	.071	8th	–	–	–	–	Eliminated
Totals		28	4	24	.143		0	0	0	.000	0 championships
