= Renzo Subido =

Filipino basketball player

No. 1 – Biñan Tatak Gel
- Position: Point guard
- League: MPBL

Personal information
- Born: February 17, 1997 (age 29) Bukidnon, Philippines
- Listed height: 5 ft 9 in (1.75 m)
- Listed weight: 135 lb (61 kg)

Career information
- High school: DLSZ (Muntinlupa)
- College: UST (2014–2016, 2018–2019)
- PBA draft: 2019: 2nd round, 24th overall pick
- Drafted by: NorthPort Batang Pier
- Playing career: 2019–present

Career history
- 2019–2020: San Juan Knights
- 2020–2022: NorthPort Batang Pier
- 2022–2023: Davao Occidental Tigers
- 2024: Zamboanga Master Sardines
- 2025–present: Biñan Tatak Gel

Career highlights
- PBA All-Rookie Team (2020)

Henri Lorenzo P. Subido (born February 17, 1997) is a Filipino professional basketball player for the Biñan Tatak Gel of the Maharlika Pilipinas Basketball League (MPBL). He was drafted 24th overall by the NorthPort during the 2019 PBA draft. He played college basketball for the UST Growling Tigers of the University Athletic Association of the Philippines (UAAP).

== Early life and high school career ==
Subido was born in Bukidnon but he grew up in Quezon City. He learned basketball at the age of nine from his father, Henry Subido, who was a former UP Maroon. He grew up idolizing Deron Williams, Rajon Rondo, and Kobe Bryant. In 2009, he won his first Palarong Pambansa title for NCR over Western Visayas. He won another Palarong Pambansa title in 2012 this time over CALABARZON.

In high school, Subido played for De La Salle Santiago Zobel School, where he led the UAAP Juniors division in scoring for two seasons. He also got into the Mythical Five in 2012, along with Thirdy Ravena. In 2014, he got to play in the Slam Rising Stars Classic and the NBTC All-Star Game.

== College career ==
=== Struggles in early seasons ===
In 2014, Subido left DLSU to join the UST Growling Tigers. Before the start of the UAAP season, he participated in the Nike All-Asia Basketball Camp, where he made the Mythical Five. In his first season, he outplayed main point guard Jon Sheriff.

Before the start of his sophomore season, Subido suffered an ACL injury. He was able to return in five months, but an ankle sprain prevented him from finishing the season.

In Season 79, Subido helped UST get its first win of the season with 26 points on 9-of-16 shooting including a 4-of-9 clip from beyond the arc against the UE Red Warriors. In a 38-point loss to DLSU, he had 18 points, but committed nine turnovers. UST did not make the Final Four that season. In his first three seasons, he only averaged 3.7 points on 29.1 percent shooting to go along with 1.1 assists.

=== Stint in PBA D-League ===
In 2017, Subido decided to sit out Season 80 to play in the PBA D-League. He first played for AMA under Coach Mark Herrera. He then led the Marinerong Pilipino Skippers to the semifinals of the 2017 D-League Foundation Cup. In November of that year, he announced that he would return to UST the next year. He played one more conference for the Skippers before UST pulled him out from the team.

=== Resurgence with UST ===
==== UAAP Season 81 ====
With Coach Aldin Ayo now with UST, UST was expected to be better than previous seasons. To start Season 81, Subido scored 15 points to lead UST to a win over the NU Bulldogs, but he and backcourt partner Marvin Lee had bad shooting percentages that game. He then scored 18 points on 4-of-9 shooting from downtown in a win over the FEU Tamaraws, gaining a Player of the Week award. In a 32-point loss to the Ateneo Blue Eagles, he led with 19 points but took 21 shots to score those points. In another loss, this time to DLSU, he led with 16 points, but shot just 4-of-13 from the field. UST finally broke its losing streak against UE, in which he had 22 points. They ended the first round of eliminations with a 3–4 record.

In another win over FEU, Subido and Lee combined for 31 points to start off the second round on a winning note. They then lost to NU, with him scoring 18 points on 6-of-17 shooting. He then was out for several games due to foot injuries. He made his return against DLSU, but they lost that game by 41 points. UST then lost to UP, ending their Final Four hopes once again. They did manage to improve their record from the previous two seasons, and finished in sixth place. After the basketball tournament ended, he played in the UAAP's 3x3 tournament alongside Rhenz Abando.

==== UAAP Season 82 ====
Subido announced that he would play his final season with UST before joining the San Juan Knights in the MPBL. UST started the season 2–0 with a win over UP in which he had 13 points, three rebounds, and three assists while his rookie backcourt partner Mark Nonoy had 16 points, five rebounds and two assists. In a game against NU, he was given an unsportsmanlike foul after referees caught him pinching Dave Ildefonso's behind. In a win over FEU, he had 11 points and five assists, while Nonoy had 11 points and six rebounds. Against UP, he hit a clutch triple in the final 30 seconds of the game that sealed the win for UP and finished the game with 13 points on 3-of-6 sniping from deep, alongside five rebounds and five assists. He then had 14 points on 4-of-6 shooting from three along with three rebounds and two assists in a win over NU.

The Tigers then won three of their last four matches, getting into the Final Four to face off against FEU. In that game, Subido scored 14 points and UST moved on to the next phase against UP, who held a twice-to-beat advantage. In Game 1 against UP, he had 12 assists to steal the win from UP. In Game 2, he made the game-winning three pointer with 23.6 seconds remaining that completed the upset over UP, and sent UST back to the Finals. In the Finals, they would lose in two games to Ateneo, with him finishing his college career with eight points.

== Professional career ==
=== San Juan Knights ===
Shortly after his college career ended, Subido signed with the San Juan Knights in the Maharlika Pilipinas Basketball League (MPBL). In a win over the Caloocan Supremos, he had 16 points and made four triples. San Juan then released him so that he could play for NorthPort.

=== NorthPort Batang Pier ===
In 2019, Subido was drafted with the 24th overall pick (last pick of the second round) by the NorthPort Batang Pier. He joined a heavy guard rotation that included Paolo Taha, Nico Elorde, and LA Revilla although star player Robert Bolick was out of the rotation due to an ACL injury. In a win over the Terrafirma Dyip, he scored 10 of his 18 points in the fourth quarter. Later in the season, he had 15 points and eight assists in a loss to Barangay Ginebra. In his rookie season he averaged 6.1 points, 1.1 rebounds, 2.2 assists and 0.3 steals per game and later he was named to the PBA All-Rookie Team.

The following season, Subido only played eight games and averaged 1.3 points, but was still given a contract extension. He played for one more conference before he and two other players were cut from the team before the start of the 2022–23 Commissioner's Cup.

=== Davao Occidental Tigers ===
Subido then played for the Davao Occidental Tigers. In the semifinals, he contributed 17 points in the third game to send Davao to the Finals of the Pilipinas Super League (PSL). There, they would lose to the Pampanga G Lanterns.

=== Zamboanga Master Sardines ===
In 2024, Subido returned to the MPBL, this time playing for the Zamboanga Master Sardines. In the 2024 season, they lost to the Parañaque Patriots.

== PBA career statistics ==
Legend
GP	Games played	MPG	Minutes per game
FG%	Field-goal percentage	3P%	3-point field-goal percentage	FT%	Free-throw percentage
RPG	Rebounds per game	APG	Assists per game	SPG	Steals per game
BPG	Blocks per game	PPG	Points per game	**Bold**	Career high

As of the end of 2022–23 season

=== Season-by-season averages ===
Year	Team	GP	MPG	FG%	3P%	FT%	RPG	APG	SPG	BPG	PPG
2020	NorthPort	**11**	**21.0**	.307	**.353**	**1.000**	**1.1**	**2.2**	**.3**	.0	**6.1**
2021	NorthPort	8	4.2	**.333**	.286	**1.000**	.3	.4	.1	.0	1.3
2022–23	NorthPort	3	7.1	.143	.000	.500	.7	1.0	.0	.0	1.0
Career		22	13.0	.297	.328	.857	.7	1.4	.2	.0	3.6

== Personal life ==
Subido's father is a former basketball coach who also mentored Gian Mamuyac and Matthew Aquino. His younger brother also played for De La Salle Zobel. His grandfather Pedro was a 1958 Asian Games gold medalist in the 4×100-meter relay and former national team coach.

One of his childhood friends is former UAAP Juniors MVP Aljun Melecio. They grew up in Bukidnon together and Melecio's family also moved to Quezon City.
