= Aldin Ayo =

Filipino basketball player and coach

Member of the Sorsogon City Council
- In office June 30, 2010 – June 30, 2019

Personal details
- Born: Aldin Valladolid Ayo; October 15, 1977 (age 49) Sorsogon City, Sorsogon, Philippines
- Party: NPC
- Basketball career

Career information
- College: Letran
- Position: Head coach
- Coaching career: 2012–present

Career history

Coaching
- 2014–2015: Mahindra Enforcer (assistant)
- 2015: Letran
- 2015–2017: De La Salle
- 2018–2020: UST
- 2018–2020: Muntinlupa Cagers
- 2020–2022: Chooks-to-Go 3x3 pro circuit teams
- 2021: Bicol Volcanoes
- 2022–2024: Converge FiberXers

Career highlights
- As player: 2× NCAA champion (1998–1999); As coach: NCAA champion (2015); NCAA Coach of the Year (2015); UAAP champion (2016); FIBA 3x3 Asia Pacific Super Quest (2020)

Aldin Valladolid Ayo (born October 15, 1977) is a Filipino basketball coach and politician who previously served as head coach for the Converge FiberXers of the Philippine Basketball Association (PBA). He formerly played (in late 90s) and coached his alma mater Letran Knights.

== High school career ==
Ayo, a native of Sorsogon City, graduated from Colegio De La Milagrosa in elementary and finished his high school education at the Our Lady of Peñafrancia Seminary in 1994.

== Collegiate career ==
Ayo played collegiate basketball at the Colegio de San Juan de Letran from 1998 to 2001. He teamed up with Kerby Raymundo and Chris Calaguio to help the Letran Knights win back-to-back NCAA titles in 1998 and 1999. As a player, he was instrumental in helping Letran win the title in 1999 when he hit the go-ahead layup in Game One of the finals against Jose Rizal College (now Jose Rizal University) Heavy Bombers. He finished his college education with a degree in philosophy.

== Coaching career ==
=== Career beginnings ===
Ayo's first experience in coaching began in his hometown in Sorsogon City, calling the shots for the Aemilianum College Knights varsity team, as well as his high school alma mater's varsity squad. He also had a basketball clinic called ABC (Ayo Basketball Clinic) Ideas, which started as a means to fund an ailing basketball program for Aemilianum College, but was shut off a year after. By the time he became councilor, he continued to conduct basketball clinics for free, until he started getting the attention of then-national youth coach Eric Altamirano, who invited him to the Nike Elite Basketball Camp, and later on, to the National Basketball Training Center. In 2012, he joined the Alaska-Jr. NBA and JR. WNBA Camp and was awarded the Coach of the Year. His experience in the grassroots level and youth camps have earned him an invitation from then assistant coaches Glenn Capacio and Louie Gonzales to join the Kia Sorento (now Mahindra Enforcer) coaching staff in the PBA under Coach Manny Pacquiao, which he accepted.

=== Letran Knights ===
In 2014, Ayo was named the new head coach of his alma mater's varsity team, the Letran Knights, besting the likes of former college teammate Kerby Raymundo and PBA legend and fellow Letran alumnus Samboy Lim. In 2015, even with a small lineup yet applying pressure mayhem defense and relentless run and gun offense, he led the Knights to win the NCAA Championship since 2005 and dethrone their archrivals, the erstwhile five-time champion San Beda Red Lions. He left the Knights to coach the DLSU Green Archers, citing problems with his family and the business. In 2016, he and FEU Tamaraws coach Nash Racela both received the Coach of the Year award by the UAAP and NCAA Press Corps in the 2016 College Basketball Awards.

=== De La Salle Green Archers ===
In 2015, Ayo was named the new head coach of the De La Salle Green Archers following Juno Sauler's resignation after the Archers were eliminated from the Final Four. He would go on to win a championship title in his first season, which included a memorable undefeated streak by the team.

=== UST Growling Tigers ===
On January 3, 2018, Coach Ayo signed with the University of Santo Tomas Growling Tigers basketball team to be their head coach replacing former coach Rodil "Boy" Sablan who resigned in November 2017. This will be his second time coaching a Dominican school after leading Letran to a title in 2015.

One year after taking over as head coach, Ayo led the UST Growling Tigers to the UAAP Season 82 Men's Basketball Finals by winning against the FEU Tamaraws and UP Fighting Maroons in the stepladder semifinals before meeting the Ateneo Blue Eagles. The Growling Tigers eventually lost in two games to the Blue Eagles, who completed a 16-game winning streak and won their third straight UAAP Men's Basketball Championship title under head coach Tab Baldwin.

On September 4, 2020, Ayo resigned as Growling Tigers head coach due to him holding practices with the team in Sorsogon amidst the COVID-19 pandemic which violates the quarantine protocols set by the Philippine government. The resulting controversy led to the departure of some of the players from UST namely CJ Cansino, Rhenz Abando, Brent Paraiso, Ira Bataller, and Jun Asuncion. As a result of this, the UAAP imposed an indefinite ban on Ayo which prevents him from taking any future role within the collegiate league.

=== Muntinlupa Cagers ===
In September 2018, the management of the Muntinlupa Cagers announced that they will tap Coach Ayo as their new head coach during the 2018 MPBL Datu Cup.

=== Chooks-to-Go 3x3 ===
Aldin Ayo was appointed as head coach of the Chooks-to-Go's 3x3 program in November 2020 succeeding Eric Altamirano. Under his watch, Cebu Chooks won the 2020 FIBA 3x3 Asia Pacific Super Quest, the first Philippine team to win a FIBA 3x3 Men's Pro Circuit title. In August 2022, he resigned as head coach of Chooks-to-Go's 3x3 program to tend to his mother who has been diagnosed with stage 4 cancer. Chico Lanete replaced him as interim head coach.

=== Bicol Volcanoes ===
November 2021 marks the return of Ayo in the MPBL, with his appointment as head coach of the Bicol Volcanoes. The team would play in the 2021 MPBL Invitational under Ayo. However the team would not feature in the 2022–23 MPBL Mumbaki season.

== Coaching record ==
=== Collegiate record ===
Season	Team	Elimination round					Playoffs				
Season	Team	GP	W	L	PCT	Finish	GP	W	L	PCT	Results
2015	CSJL	18	13	5	.722	1st	5	3	2	.600	Champions
2016	DLSU	14	13	1	.929	1st	3	3	0	1.000	Champions
2017	DLSU	14	12	2	.857	2nd	4	2	2	.500	Finals
2018	UST	14	5	9	.357	6th	—	—	—	—	Eliminated
2019	UST	14	8	6	.571	4th	5	3	2	.600	Finals
Totals		74	51	23	.689		17	11	6	.647	2 championships

=== Professional record ===
Season	Conference	Team	Elimination round					Playoffs				
Season	Conference	Team	GP	W	L	PCT	Finish	GP	W	L	PCT	Results
2022–23	Philippine Cup	Converge	11	5	6	.455	7th	1	0	1	.000	Quarterfinals
2022–23	Commissioner's Cup	Converge	12	8	4	.667	4th	2	0	2	.000	Quarterfinals
2022–23	Governors' Cup	Converge	11	6	5	.545	7th	1	0	1	.000	Quarterfinals
2023–24	Commissioner's Cup	Converge	11	1	10	.081	12th	—	—	—	—	Eliminated
2023–24	Philippine Cup	Converge	11	2	9	.182	12th	—	—	—	—	Eliminated
Career total			56	22	34	.393	Playoff Total	4	0	4	.000	0 championships

== Political career ==
As a politician, Ayo has served as city councilor of Sorsogon City for two terms since 2010. He was supposed to run for his third term of office in the upcoming 2016 elections, however he backed out due to personal and family reasons. He later had a change of heart and still ran for councilor, which he won in 2016 elections.

He headed several committees on Trade, Commerce and Industry as well as Agriculture and Food. He is affiliated with the Nationalist People's Coalition.

Sporting positions
Preceded by Caloy Garcia	Letran Knights men's basketball head coach 2015	Succeeded by Jeff Napa
Preceded by Juno Sauler	De La Salle Green Archers men's basketball head coach 2016–2017	Succeeded by Louie Gonzales
Preceded by Rodil Sablan	UST Growling Tigers men's basketball head coach 2018–2020	Succeeded by Jino Manansala
