= Louie Vigil =

Filipino basketball player

Free agent
- Position: Shooting guard / small forward

Personal information
- Born: September 26, 1991 (age 35)
- Listed height: 6 ft 3 in (1.91 m)
- Listed weight: 200 lb (91 kg)

Career information
- High school: JRU (Mandaluyong)
- College: UST
- PBA draft: 2017: 2nd round, 17th overall pick
- Drafted by: San Miguel Beermen
- Playing career: 2017–present

Career history
- 2017–2019: San Miguel Beermen
- 2019–2020: San Miguel Alab Pilipinas
- 2022–2023: NorthPort Batang Pier
- 2024: Bacolod City of Smiles
- 2025: Val City Magic
- 2026: Marikina Shoemasters

Career highlights
- 3× PBA champion (2017–18 Philippine, 2019 Philippine, 2019 Commissioner's); MPBL All-Star (2024)

Louie Philippe Vicente Vigil (born September 26, 1991) is a Filipino professional basketball player who last played for the Marikina Shoemasters of the Maharlika Pilipinas Basketball League (MPBL).

== PBA career statistics ==
Legend
GP	Games played	MPG	Minutes per game
FG%	Field-goal percentage	3P%	3-point field-goal percentage	FT%	Free-throw percentage
RPG	Rebounds per game	APG	Assists per game	SPG	Steals per game
BPG	Blocks per game	PPG	Points per game	**Bold**	Career high

As of the end of 2022–23 season

=== Season-by-season averages ===
Year	Team	GP	MPG	FG%	3P%	FT%	RPG	APG	SPG	BPG	PPG
2017–18	San Miguel	**18**	2.4	**.294**	.000	.714	.3	.4	.0	.1	.8
2019	San Miguel	9	3.2	.154	.000	.273	1.0	.2	.2	.1	.8
2022–23	NorthPort	10	**5.4**	.263	.000	**.750**	**1.2**	**.5**	**.3**	**.2**	**1.6**
Career		37	3.4	.245	.000	.538	.7	.4	.1	.1	1.0
