= UAAP Season 80 basketball tournaments =

Basketball season

UAAP Season 80
- "Go for Great"
- Host school: Far Eastern University
Men's Finals	G1	G2	G3	Wins
Ateneo Blue Eagles	76	83	88	2
De La Salle Green Archers	70	92	86	1
- Duration: November 25–December 3, 2017
- Arena(s): Mall of Asia Arena; Smart Araneta Coliseum
- Finals MVP: Thirdy Ravena
- Winning coach: Tab Baldwin (1st title)
- Semifinalists: Adamson Soaring Falcons; FEU Tamaraws
- TV network(s): ABS-CBN Sports and Action, ABS-CBN, ABS-CBN HD, The Filipino Channel, ABS-CBN Sports and Action HD
Women's Finals	G1	G2	Wins
NU Lady Bulldogs	89	79	2
UE Lady Warriors	61	68	0
- Duration: November 29–December 3, 2017
- Arena(s): Smart Araneta Coliseum
- Finals MVP: Trixie Antiquera
- Winning coach: Patrick Aquino (4th title)
- Semifinalists: UST Growling Tigresses; FEU Lady Tamaraws
- TV network(s): ABS-CBN Sports and Action, ABS-CBN, ABS-CBN HD, The Filipino Channel, ABS-CBN Sports and Action HD
Juniors' Finals	G1	G2	G3	Wins
Ateneo Blue Eaglets	86	67	63	2
NUNS Bullpups	70	70	58	1
- Duration: February 23–March 2, 2018
- Arena(s): Filoil Flying V Centre
- Finals MVP: Kai Sotto
- Winning coach: Joe Silva (2nd title)
- Semifinalists: UST Tiger Cubs; FEU–D Baby Tamaraws
- TV network(s): ABS-CBN Sports+Action, ABS-CBN Sports+Action HD

The UAAP Season 80 basketball tournaments were the University Athletic Association of the Philippines (UAAP) basketball tournaments for the 2017–18 school year. The tournaments are divided into men's, women's and juniors' divisions, for male and female college players and male high school players, respectively. The host school for the seniors' division was Far Eastern University, while Ateneo de Manila University was the sub-host for the juniors' division. The De La Salle Green Archers, NU Lady Bulldogs, and FEU Baby Tamaraws are the defending champions for the men's, women's and juniors respectively.

The senior men’s tournament began on September 9, 2017 and the games for the women's division followed on September 10. The juniors' tournament began on November 11.

Attorney Rene Saguisag, Jr. who was appointed UAAP's executive director served as commissioner for the third straight season.

== Teams ==
All eight member universities of the UAAP field teams in all three tournaments.

University	Men's team	Women's team	Juniors' team
Adamson University	Soaring Falcons	Lady Falcons	Baby Falcons
Ateneo de Manila University	Blue Eagles	Lady Eagles	Blue Eaglets
De La Salle University	Green Archers	Lady Archers	Junior Archers
Far Eastern University	Tamaraws	Lady Tamaraws	Baby Tamaraws
National University	Bulldogs	Lady Bulldogs	Bullpups
University of the East	Red Warriors	Lady Warriors	Junior Warriors
University of the Philippines Diliman	Fighting Maroons	Lady Maroons	Junior Maroons
University of Santo Tomas	Growling Tigers	Tigresses	Tiger Cubs

=== Coaches ===
University	Men's coach	Women's coach	Juniors' coach
Adamson University	(Philippines) Franz Pumaren	(Philippines) John Kallos	(Philippines) Mike Fermin
Ateneo de Manila University	(United States) Tab Baldwin	(Philippines) Anthony John Flores	(Philippines) Joe Silva
De La Salle University	(Philippines) Aldin Ayo	(Philippines) Pocholo Villanueva	(Philippines) Boris Aldeguer
Far Eastern University	(Philippines) Olsen Racela	(Philippines) Bert Flores	(Philippines) Allan Albano
National University	(Philippines) Jamike Jarin	(Philippines) Patrick Aquino	(Philippines) Goldwin Monteverde
University of the East	(Philippines) Derrick Pumaren	(Philippines) Aileen Lebornio	(Philippines) Florence Conlu
University of the Philippines Diliman	(Philippines) Bo Perasol	(Philippines) Kenneth Marius Raval	(Philippines) Paolo Mendoza
University of Santo Tomas	(Philippines) Boy Sablan	(Philippines) Haydee Ong	(Philippines) Chris Cantonjos

=== Coaching changes ===
Team	Outgoing coach	Manner of departure	Date	Replaced by	Date
FEU Tamaraws	(Philippines) Nash Racela	Signed with TNT KaTropa	November 30, 2016	(Philippines) Olsen Racela	December 20, 2016
NU Bulldogs	(Philippines) Eric Altamirano	Resignation	December 1, 2016	(Philippines) Jamike Jarin	January 6, 2017
Adamson Baby Falcons	(Philippines) Goldwin Monteverde	Resignation	April 11, 2017	(Philippines) Mike Fermin	May 2, 2017
NU Bullpups	(Philippines) Jeff Napa	Resignation	April 2017	(Philippines) Goldwin Monteverde	April 29, 2017
Adamson Lady Falcons	(Philippines) Mike Fermin	Signed with Adamson Baby Falcons	May 2017	(Philippines) John Kallos	May 2, 2017
UE Junior Warriors	(Philippines) Luis Palaganas			(Philippines) Florence Conlu	

== Venues ==
The Mall of Asia Arena, Smart Araneta Coliseum and the Filoil Flying V Centre are the venues for the men's tournament. The venues for the women's tournament are the Mall of Asia Arena, the Smart Araneta Coliseum and the Ateneo Blue Eagle Gym. The Filoil Flying V Centre and the Ateneo Blue Eagle Gym will serve as the venues for the juniors' tournament.

== Men's tournament ==
=== Elimination round ===
==== Team standings ====
Pos	Team	W	L	PCT	GB	Qualification
1	Ateneo Blue Eagles	13	1	.929	—	Twice-to-beat in the semifinals
2	De La Salle Green Archers	12	2	.857	1	Twice-to-beat in the semifinals
3	Adamson Soaring Falcons	9	5	.643	4	Twice-to-win in the semifinals
4	FEU Tamaraws (H)	7	7	.500	6	Twice-to-win in the semifinals
5	UP Fighting Maroons	6	8	.429	7	
6	NU Bulldogs	5	9	.357	8	
7	UE Red Warriors	3	11	.214	10	
8	UST Growling Tigers	1	13	.071	12	

Source: ABS-CBN Sports
Rules for classification: 1) winning percentage; 2) if tied for #2 or #4, one-game playoff; 3) head-to-head record; 4) head-to-head point differential; 5) overall point differential
(H) Hosts

==== Match-up results ====
	Round 1							Round 2						
Team ╲ Game	1	2	3	4	5	6	7	8	9	10	11	12	13	14
Adamson	Ateneo school colors	UST school colors	La Salle school colors	NU school colors	UE school colors	UP school colors	FEU school colors	Ateneo school colors	UE school colors	La Salle school colors	UST school colors	NU school colors	UP school colors	FEU school colors
Ateneo	Adamson school colors	UP school colors	FEU school colors	UE school colors	UST school colors	NU school colors	La Salle school colors	Adamson school colors	NU school colors	FEU school colors	UE school colors	UST school colors	UP school colors	La Salle school colors
La Salle	FEU school colors	NU school colors	Adamson school colors	UP school colors	UST school colors	UE school colors	Ateneo school colors	FEU school colors	UP school colors	Adamson school colors	UE school colors	UST school colors	NU school colors	Ateneo school colors
FEU	La Salle school colors	UE school colors	Ateneo school colors	UST school colors	NU school colors	UP school colors	Adamson school colors	La Salle school colors	UST school colors	Ateneo school colors	UP school colors	UE school colors	NU school colors	Adamson school colors
NU	UE school colors	La Salle school colors	UST school colors	Adamson school colors	FEU school colors	Ateneo school colors	UP school colors	UE school colors	Ateneo school colors	UST school colors	Adamson school colors	La Salle school colors	FEU school colors	UP school colors
UE	NU school colors	FEU school colors	UP school colors	Ateneo school colors	Adamson school colors	La Salle school colors	UST school colors	NU school colors	Adamson school colors	UP school colors	La Salle school colors	Ateneo school colors	FEU school colors	UST school colors
UP	UST school colors	Ateneo school colors	UE school colors	La Salle school colors	FEU school colors	Adamson school colors	NU school colors	UST school colors	La Salle school colors	UE school colors	FEU school colors	Adamson school colors	Ateneo school colors	NU school colors
UST	UP school colors	Adamson school colors	NU school colors	FEU school colors	Ateneo school colors	La Salle school colors	UE school colors	UP school colors	FEU school colors	NU school colors	Adamson school colors	La Salle school colors	Ateneo school colors	UE school colors

= Win; = OT win; = Loss; = OT loss

==== Scores ====
Teams	AdU	AdMU	DLSU	FEU	NU	UE	UP	UST
Adamson Soaring Falcons	—	65–85	73–85	95–79	83–76	79–60	73–71	88–81
Ateneo Blue Eagles	71–59	—	76–75	94–82	96–83	83–65	92–71	94–84
De La Salle Green Archers	80–74	79–76	—	95–90	115–109	106–100	87–98	115–86
FEU Tamaraws	71–54	59–70	73–75	—	90–83	90–83	78–59	78–65
NU Bulldogs	77–90	72–85	76–101	87–84	—	86–69	77–70	94–84
UE Red Warriors	57–66	73–97	78–99	63–79	90–77	—	71–84	96–91
UP Fighting Maroons	70–86	82–96	62–85	59–56	106–81	64–73	—	74–73
UST Growling Tigers	70–75	83–102	59–94	70–96	83–91	88–85	69–71	—

Legend: Blue = left column team win; Red = top row team win.
Matches with lighter background shading were decided after overtime.

=== Bracket ===
Semifinals (Top 2 twice-to-beat)
1	Ateneo	67	88*
4	FEU	80	84
2	La Salle	82
3	Adamson	75

Finals (Best-of-three playoff)
1	Ateneo	76	83	88
2	La Salle	70	92	86

*Overtime

=== Semifinals ===
In the semifinals, the higher seed has the twice-to-beat advantage, where they only have to win once, while their opponents twice, to progress.

==== (1) Ateneo vs. (4) FEU ====
The Ateneo Blue Eagles has the twice-to-beat advantage.

S+A

November 19
4:00 p.m.PHT

Boxscore

Ateneo Blue Eagles	67–80	FEU Tamaraws
Scoring by quarter: 15–21, 20–17, 13–21, 19–21
Pts: Thirdy Ravena 17; Rebs: Thirdy Ravena 6 Asts: 3 players, 3 each		Pts: Ron Dennison 17; Rebs: Ron Dennison 8 Asts: Jasper Parker 5

Smart Araneta Coliseum, Quezon City
Referees: Nestor Sembrano, AJ Escobido, Art Herrera

S+A

November 22
4:00 p.m.PHT

Boxscore

Ateneo Blue Eagles	88–84 (OT)	FEU Tamaraws
Scoring by quarter: 21–15, 19–18, 17–20, 18–22, Overtime: 13–9
Pts: Thirdy Ravena 17; Rebs: Chibueze Ikeh 11; Asts: Ravena, Ma. Nieto, 4 each		Pts: Jasper Parker 19; Rebs: Comboy, Orizu, 6 each Asts: Comboy, Dennison, 4 each
Ateneo wins series in two games

Mall of Asia Arena, Pasay
Referees: Nestor Sembrano, Eric Viray, A. Dasal

==== (2) La Salle vs. (3) Adamson ====
The De La Salle Green Archers has the twice-to-beat advantage.

S+A

November 18
4:00 p.m.PHT

Boxscore

De La Salle Green Archers	82–75	Adamson Soaring Falcons
Scoring by quarter: 11–21, 22–18, 21–24, 28–12
Pts: Ben Mbala 27; Rebs: Ben Mbala 14; Asts: Ricci Rivero 6		Pts: Jerrick Ahanmisi 17; Rebs: Sarr, Hill, 9 each Asts: Jerie Pingoy 6
La Salle wins series in one game

Smart Araneta Coliseum, Quezon City
Referees: Mollie de Luna, Ian Borbe, Enan Alejo

=== Finals ===
ABS-CBN, S+A

November 25
4:00 p.m.PHT

Report

Ateneo Blue Eagles	76–70	De La Salle Green Archers
Scoring by quarter: 26–14, 17–25, 17–19, 16–12
Pts: Thirdy Ravena 12; Rebs: Chiz Ikeh 9 Asts: Thirdy Ravena 4		Pts: Aljun Melecio 24; Rebs: Ben Mbala 12; Asts: Ben Mbala 4

Mall of Asia Arena, Pasay
Referees: Nestor Sembrano, Art Herrera, Joel Baldago

S+A

November 29
4:00 p.m.PHT

Report

Ateneo Blue Eagles	83–92	De La Salle Green Archers
Scoring by quarter: 32–15, 19–27, 8–26, 24–24
Pts: Thirdy Ravena 20; Rebs: Chiz Ikeh 7 Asts: Thirdy Ravena 4		Pts: Ben Mbala 20; Rebs: Ben Mbala 16; Asts: Kib Montalbo 5

Smart Araneta Coliseum, Quezon City
Attendance: 15,286
Referees: AJ Escobido, Nestor Sambrano, A. Dasal

ABS-CBN, S+A

December 3
4:00 p.m.PHT

Report

Ateneo Blue Eagles	88–86	De La Salle Green Archers
Scoring by quarter: 24–14, 21–24, 21–28, 22–20
Pts: Thirdy Ravena 17; Rebs: Chiz Ikeh 13; Asts: Thirdy Ravena 5		Pts: Ben Mbala 19; Rebs: Ben Mbala 14; Asts: Aljun Melecio 4
Ateneo wins series, 2–1

Smart Araneta Coliseum, Quezon City
Attendance: 22,012
Referees: Art Herrera, Nestor Sambrano, AJ Escobido

- Finals Most Valuable Player: Thirdy Ravena (Ateneo Blue Eagles)

=== Awards ===
UAAP Season 80 men's basketball champions
Ateneo Blue Eagles
Ninth title

- Most Valuable Player: Benoit Mbala (De La Salle Green Archers)
- Rookie of the Year: Juan Gómez de Liaño (UP Fighting Maroons)
- Mythical Team:
  - Benoit Mbala (De La Salle Green Archers)
  - Thirdy Ravena (Ateneo Blue Eagles)
  - Jjay Alejandro (NU Bulldogs)
  - Alvin Pasaol (UE Red Warriors)
  - Ricci Paolo Rivero (De La Salle Green Archers)

==== Sponsored awards ====
- Manulife 110% Heart and Hustle Player of the Season: Joseph Matthew Nieto (Ateneo Blue Eagles)
- Shell V-Power Most Efficient Player of the Season: Ben Mbala (De La Salle Green Archers)
- Appeton Most Improved Player of the Season: Ricci Rivero (De La Salle Green Archers)
- Milo Nutri-up Up Your Galing Performance Award: UP Fighting Maroons
- PSBankable Player of the Season: Ben Mbala (De La Salle Green Archers)
- Manulife 110% Heart and Hustle Player of the Finals: Isaac Go (Ateneo Blue Eagles)
- PSBankable Player of the Finals: Thirdy Ravena (Ateneo Blue Eagles)
- BDO Winning Ways Coach of the Season: Tab Baldwin (Ateneo Blue Eagles)

==== Players of the Week ====
Week ending	Player	Team	Ref
September 17	(Philippines) Thirdy Ravena	Ateneo Blue Eagles	
September 24	(Philippines) Paul Desiderio	UP Fighting Maroons	
October 1	(Cameroon) Chibueze Ikeh	Ateneo Blue Eagles	
October 8	(Philippines) Alvin Pasaol	UE Red Warriors	
October 15	(Philippines) Ricci Rivero	De La Salle Green Archers	
October 22	(Philippines) Alvin Pasaol	UE Red Warriors	
October 29	(Philippines) Jerrick Ahanmisi	Adamson Soaring Falcons	
November 5	(Philippines) Jerie Pingoy	Adamson Soaring Falcons	

=== Statistics ===
==== Players' statistical points ====
#	Player	Team	Total
1	(Cameroon) Benoit Mbala	De La Salle Green Archers	96.58
2	(Philippines) Thirdy Ravena	Ateneo Blue Eagles	66.50
3	(Philippines) Jjay Alejandro	NU Bulldogs	63.86
4	(Philippines) Alvin Pasaol	UE Red Warriors	63.43
5	(Cameroon) Soulemane Gawall Cherif Sarr	Adamson Soaring Falcons	63.15

Source: ABS-CBN Sports

==== Season player highs ====
Statistic	Player	Team	Average
Points	(Cameroon) Ben Mbala	De La Salle Green Archers	24.9
Rebounds	(Cameroon) Ben Mbala	De La Salle Green Archers	13.6
Assists	(Philippines) Jjay Alejandro	NU Bulldogs	6.7
Steals	(Philippines) Jerie Pingoy	Adamson Soaring Falcons	2.6
Blocks	(Senegal) Issa Seny Diouf Gaye	NU Bulldogs	2.7

Source: HumbleBola Stats

==== Game player highs ====
Statistic	Player	Team	Total	Opponent
Points	(Philippines) Alvin Pasaol	UE Red Warriors	49	De La Salle Green Archers
Rebounds	(Cameroon) Steve Cedrick Akomo	UST Growling Tigers	20	UP Fighting Maroons; UE Red Warriors
Assists	(Philippines) Jerie Pingoy (Philippines) Jjay Alejandro	Adamson Soaring Falcons; NU Bulldogs	10	FEU Tamaraws; UE Red Warriors
Steals	(Philippines) Jerie Pingoy	Adamson Soaring Falcons	6	UST Growling Tigers; NU Bulldogs; UP Fighting Maroons
Steals	(Cameroon) Benoit Mbala	De La Salle Green Archers	6	Ateneo Blue Eagles
Blocks	(Senegal) Issa Seny Diouf Gaye (Cameroon) Steve Cedrick Akomo (Cameroon) Benoit Mbala	NU Bulldogs; UST Growling Tigers; De La Salle Green Archers	6	UST Growling Tigers; UE Red Warriors; Ateneo Blue Eagles

Source: HumbleBola Stats

==== Game team highs ====
Statistic	Team	Total	Opponent
Points	De La Salle Green Archers	115	NU Bulldogs; UST Growling Tigers
Rebounds	Ateneo Blue Eagles	60	Adamson Soaring Falcons
Assists	NU Bulldogs	27	UST Growling Tigers
Steals	Adamson Soaring Falcons; De La Salle Green Archers	16	UST Growling Tigers; UST Growling Tigers
Blocks	UST Growling Tigers	11	UE Red Warriors

Source: HumbleBola Stats

==== Season team highs ====
Statistic	Team	Average
Points	Ateneo Blue Eagles	78.5
Rebounds	UST Growling Tigers	45.9
Assists	FEU Tamaraws	17.4
Steals	Adamson Soaring Falcons	8.0
Blocks	UST Growling Tigers	4.4

Source: HumbleBola Stats

=== Broadcast notes ===
ABS-CBN Sports is the official broadcaster of the UAAP Season 80 Men's Basketball games.

Game	Play-by-play	Analyst	Courtside Reporters
Semis #1 vs. #4, Game 1	Boom Gonzales	TJ Manotoc	Sydney Crespo, Martie Bautista & Paui Versoza
Semis #1 vs. #4, Game 2	Nikko Ramos	Marco Benitez	Martie Bautista, Sydney Crespo & Angelique Manto
Semis #2 vs. #3	Eric Tipan	Ronnie Magsanoc	Eileen Shi, Stef Monce & Angelique Manto
Finals, Game 1	Mico Halili	Ronnie Magsanoc	Martie Bautista, Eileen Shi & Paui Versoza
Finals, Game 2	Boom Gonzales	Ronnie Magsanoc	Eileen Shi, Martie Bautista & Angelique Manto
Finals, Game 3	Boom Gonzales	Christian Luanzon	Martie Bautista, Eileen Shi & Paui Versoza

=== UAAP-JBL Three-Point Contest ===
The UAAP Three-Point Contest, or the UAAP-JBL Three-Point Contest for sponsorship reasons, is the inaugural three-point competition of the UAAP in the basketball discipline. The contest served as a transition event from the first round going to the second round of eliminations. All eight universities fielded representative shooters to compete for the chance to clinch ₱80,000 and JBL products for the winner, and another ₱50,000 will be given to the winning university. In the end of the competition, the older brother of Adrian Wong, Dan Angelo Wong, claimed the inaugural title for the said competition.

==== Competition format ====
In the first round, all eight participants will get a chance to shoot as many three-pointers as they can within the time limit of one (1) minute. In each rack, the first four balls were regular balls, which is worth only one point, and the fifth and the last ball is the moneyball, which is worth two points. After the first round, only the top two (2) players would advance the final round, competing for the championship.

==== Results ====
Pos	Participant	First round	Final Round
1	Dan Angelo Wong (Ateneo)	22	17
2	Mark Maloles (UE)	18	15
3	Jerrick Ahanmisi (Adamson)	18	Eliminated
4	Jojo Trinidad (FEU)	17	Eliminated
5	JP Cauilan (NU)	16	Eliminated
6	Ralph Cu (La Salle)	14	Eliminated
7	Diego Dario (UP)	13	Eliminated
8	Marvin Lee (UST)	8	Eliminated

== Women's tournament ==
The NU Lady Bulldogs won their 64th straight match after clinching their four-peat championship against the UE Lady Warriors on December 3, 2017.

NU's Ria Nabalan recorded a triple-double in their second round win over the FEU Lady Tamaraws on October 18, 2017. Nabalan tallied 12 points, 10 rebounds and 10 assists to lead the Lady Bulldogs to their 56th consecutive win that dates back to Season 77.

For the first time in 49 years, the UE Lady Warriors advanced to the Finals after defeating the UST Tigresses in the second round of the Stepladder semifinals to face the undefeated NU Lady Bulldogs. A punch thrown by UST's Sai Larosa at Love Sto. Domingo ignited a bench-clearing brawl among the players of the two teams. Larosa was disqualified from inclusion to the Mythical team following her ejection and subsequent suspension.

The UE Lady Warriors held the Adamson Lady Falcons to a scoreless 2nd quarter in their 62-44 win on October 1, 2017.

=== Elimination round ===
==== Team standings ====
Pos	Team	W	L	PCT	GB	Qualification
1	NU Lady Bulldogs	14	0	1.000	—	Advance to the Finals (Note: As NU won all of their elimination round games, the stepladder format will be used instead of the regular Final Four format.)
2	UE Lady Warriors	11	3	.786	3	Twice-to-beat in stepladder round 2
3	UST Growling Tigresses	10	4	.714	4	Proceed to stepladder round 1
4	FEU Lady Tamaraws (H)	8	6	.571	6	Proceed to stepladder round 1
5	Adamson Lady Falcons	6	8	.429	8	
6	Ateneo Lady Eagles	4	10	.286	10	
7	De La Salle Lady Archers	3	11	.214	11	
8	UP Fighting Maroons	0	14	.000	14	

Source: ABS-CBN Sports
Rules for classification: 1) winning percentage; 2) if tied for #2 or #4, one-game playoff; 3) head-to-head record; 4) head-to-head point differential; 5) overall point differential
(H) Hosts

==== Match-up results ====
	Round 1							Round 2						
Team ╲ Game	1	2	3	4	5	6	7	8	9	10	11	12	13	14
Adamson	Ateneo school colors	UST school colors	La Salle school colors	NU school colors	UE school colors	UP school colors	FEU school colors	UST school colors	UP school colors	NU school colors	FEU school colors	La Salle school colors	Ateneo school colors	UE school colors
Ateneo	Adamson school colors	UP school colors	FEU school colors	UE school colors	UST school colors	NU school colors	La Salle school colors	UE school colors	La Salle school colors	UST school colors	NU school colors	Adamson school colors	UP school colors	FEU school colors
La Salle	FEU school colors	NU school colors	Adamson school colors	UP school colors	UST school colors	UE school colors	Ateneo school colors	UST school colors	Ateneo school colors	NU school colors	Adamson school colors	UE school colors	FEU school colors	UP school colors
FEU	La Salle school colors	UE school colors	Ateneo school colors	UST school colors	NU school colors	UP school colors	Adamson school colors	NU school colors	UP school colors	Adamson school colors	UE school colors	UST school colors	La Salle school colors	Ateneo school colors
NU	UE school colors	La Salle school colors	UST school colors	Adamson school colors	FEU school colors	Ateneo school colors	UP school colors	FEU school colors	Adamson school colors	La Salle school colors	Ateneo school colors	UP school colors	UST school colors	UE school colors
UE	NU school colors	FEU school colors	UP school colors	Ateneo school colors	Adamson school colors	La Salle school colors	UST school colors	Ateneo school colors	UST school colors	UP school colors	FEU school colors	La Salle school colors	Adamson school colors	NU school colors
UP	UST school colors	Ateneo school colors	UE school colors	La Salle school colors	FEU school colors	Adamson school colors	NU school colors	Adamson school colors	FEU school colors	UE school colors	UST school colors	NU school colors	Ateneo school colors	La Salle school colors
UST	UP school colors	Adamson school colors	NU school colors	FEU school colors	Ateneo school colors	La Salle school colors	UE school colors	Adamson school colors	La Salle school colors	UE school colors	Ateneo school colors	UP school colors	FEU school colors	NU school colors

= Win; = OT win; = Loss; = OT loss

==== Scores ====
Teams	AdU	AdMU	DLSU	FEU	NU	UE	UP	UST
Adamson Lady Falcons	—	58–61	88–84	55–54	38–82	44–62	67–57	66–75
Ateneo Lady Eagles	46–47	—	46–49	58–64	53–70	51–62	62–61	65–71
De La Salle Lady Archers	60–67	49–56	—	62–70	56–77	68–69	76–64	62–65
FEU Lady Tamaraws	66–60	69–60	63–61*	—	48–71	56–59	73–49	67–73
NU Lady Bulldogs	109–59	60–49	91–56	76–56	—	69–66*	92–38	95–65
UE Lady Warriors	70–51	56–48	82–79	63–61*	50–63	—	52–42	49–54
UP Fighting Maroons	60–82	42–44	72–75	48–84	35–76	36–50	—	58–85
UST Growling Tigresses	88–65	67–50	68–56	58–62	58–79	62–66	78–63	—

Legend: Blue = left column team win; Red = top row team win.
Matches with lighter background shading were decided after overtime.

=== Bracket ===
Stepladder round 1 (Single-elimination)
3	UST	86
4	FEU	72

Stepladder round 2 (No. 2 twice-to-beat)
2	UE	53	69
3	UST	63	62

Finals (Best-of-three playoff)
1	NU	89	79
2	UE	61	68

=== Stepladder semifinals ===
==== (3) UST vs. (4) FEU ====
November 19
1:00 p.m.PHT

Report

UST Growling Tigresses	86–72	FEU Lady Tamaraws
Scoring by quarter: 19–19, 20–12, 21–24, 26–17
Pts: Anjel Anies 24; Rebs: Gandalla, Peñaflor, 8 each Asts: Ruby Portillo 6		Pts: Precious Arellado 19; Rebs: Angelica Gerner 11; Asts: Precious Arellado 6
UST advances to the stepladder semifinals round 2

Smart Araneta Coliseum, Quezon City
Referees: D. See, Eric Viray, Ian Borbe

==== (2) UE vs. (3) UST ====
In the semifinals, UE has the twice-to-beat advantage, where they only have to win once, while their opponents twice, to progress.

November 22
11:00 a.m.PHT

Report

UE Lady Warriors	53–63	UST Growling Tigresses
Scoring by quarter: 9–17, 12–16, 14–14, 18–16
Pts: Ruthlaine Tacula 14; Rebs: Love Joy Sto. Domingo 12; Asts: Ruthlaine Tacula 3		Pts: Anjel Anies 21; Rebs: Jem Angeles 11; Asts: Jem Angeles 8

Mall of Asia Arena, Pasay
Referees: Allan Manzano, Art Herrera, Irewin Traballo

November 25
11:00 a.m.PHT

Report

UE Lady Warriors	69–62	UST Growling Tigresses
Scoring by quarter: 10–16, 17–19, 20–21, 22–6
Pts: Love Joy Sto. Domingo 18; Rebs: Love Joy Sto. Domingo 12; Asts: Ruthlaine Tacula 8		Pts: Anies, Larosa, 16 each Rebs: Larosa, Angeles, 8 each Asts: Jem Angeles 7
UE wins series in two games

Mall of Asia Arena, Pasay

=== Finals ===
For the fourth straight year, the NU Lady Bulldogs accomplished an elimination round sweep and will battle in a best-of-three Finals.

S+A

November 29
11:00 a.m.PHT

Report

NU Lady Bulldogs	89–61	UE Lady Warriors
Scoring by quarter: 22–7, 21–14, 20–13, 26–27
Pts: Trixie Antiquera 30; Rebs: Jack Animam 17; Asts: Janet Sison 7		Pts: Love Joy Sto. Domingo 17; Rebs: Love Joy Sto. Domingo 12; Asts: Ruthlaine Tacula 7

Smart Araneta Coliseum, Quezon City
Referees: A. Barba, Julius Medillo, Edgar Orpilla

S+A

December 3
11:00 a.m.PHT

Report

NU Lady Bulldogs	79–68	UE Lady Warriors
Scoring by quarter: 13–16, 20–19, 18–19, 28–14
Pts: Trixie Antiquera 19; Rebs: Jack Animam 23; Asts: Animam, Harada, 4 each		Pts: Ruthlaine Tacula 25; Rebs: Ruthlaine Tacula 12; Asts: Joyce Francisco 6
NU wins series 2–0

Smart Araneta Coliseum, Quezon City
Referees: D. See, Julius Medillo, Edgar Orpilla

- Finals Most Valuable Player: Trixie Antiquera (NU Lady Bulldogs)

=== Awards ===
UAAP Season 80 women's basketball champions
NU Lady Bulldogs
Fourth title, fourth consecutive title

- Most Valuable Player: Jack Danielle Animam (NU Lady Bulldogs)
- Rookie of the Year: Marian Justine Domingo (UP Lady Maroons)
- Mythical Five:
  - Jack Danielle Animam (NU Lady Bulldogs)
  - Love Joy Sto. Domingo (UE Lady Warriors)
  - Rhena Malembe Itesi (NU Lady Bulldogs)
  - Ria Joy Nabalan (NU Lady Bulldogs)
  - Jhenn Angeles (UST Growling Tigresses)

=== Statistics ===
==== Players' statistical points ====
#	Player	Team	Total
1	(Philippines) Jack Danielle Animam	NU Lady Bulldogs	77.29
2	(Philippines) Love Joy Sto. Domingo	UE Lady Warriors	75.64
3	(Democratic Republic of the Congo) Rhena Malembe Itesi	NU Lady Bulldogs	71.14
4	(Philippines) Ria Joy Nabalan	NU Lady Bulldogs	69.00
5	(Philippines) Misaela Aurea Larosa	UST Growling Tigresses	61.00

Source: Tiebreaker Times

== Juniors' tournament ==
=== Elimination round ===
==== Team standings ====
Pos	Team	W	L	PCT	GB	Qualification
1	Ateneo Blue Eaglets	14	0	1.000	—	Advance to the Finals (Note: As Ateneo won all of their elimination round games, the stepladder format will be used instead of the regular Final Four format.)
2	NUNS Bullpups (Note: NU forfeited its first round win over UE after the UAAP Board ruled that NU player Jayson Puray to be ineligible.) (H)	11	3	.786	3	Twice-to-beat in stepladder round 2
3	FEU–D Baby Tamaraws	8	6	.571	6	Proceed to stepladder round 1
4	UST Tiger Cubs	7	7	.500 (Note: Fourth-seed playoff: UST 73–72 Adamson (OT))	7	Proceed to stepladder round 1
5	Adamson Baby Falcons	7	7	.500	7	
6	Zobel Junior Archers	4	10	.286	10	
7	UPIS Junior Fighting Maroons	3	11	.214	11	
8	UE Junior Red Warriors	2	12	.143	12	

Source: ABS-CBN Sports
Rules for classification: 1) winning percentage; 2) if tied for #2 or #4, one-game playoff; 3) head-to-head record; 4) head-to-head point differential; 5) overall point differential
(H) Hosts

==== Match-up results ====
	Round 1							Round 2						
Team ╲ Game	1	2	3	4	5	6	7	8	9	10	11	12	13	14
Adamson	Ateneo school colors	UST school colors	La Salle school colors	NU school colors	UP school colors	UE school colors	FEU school colors	UP school colors	Ateneo school colors	UE school colors	FEU school colors	UST school colors	NU school colors	La Salle school colors
Ateneo	Adamson school colors	UP school colors	FEU school colors	UE school colors	UST school colors	NU school colors	La Salle school colors	UST school colors	Adamson school colors	FEU school colors	La Salle school colors	UP school colors	UE school colors	NU school colors
La Salle	FEU school colors	NU school colors	Adamson school colors	UP school colors	UE school colors	UST school colors	Ateneo school colors	UE school colors	NU school colors	UP school colors	Ateneo school colors	FEU school colors	UST school colors	Adamson school colors
FEU	La Salle school colors	UE school colors	Ateneo school colors	UST school colors	NU school colors	UP school colors	Adamson school colors	NU school colors	UE school colors	Ateneo school colors	Adamson school colors	La Salle school colors	UP school colors	UST school colors
NU	UE school colors	La Salle school colors	UST school colors	Adamson school colors	FEU school colors	Ateneo school colors	UP school colors	FEU school colors	La Salle school colors	UST school colors	UP school colors	UE school colors	Adamson school colors	Ateneo school colors
UE	NU school colors	FEU school colors	UP school colors	Ateneo school colors	La Salle school colors	Adamson school colors	UST school colors	La Salle school colors	FEU school colors	Adamson school colors	UST school colors	NU school colors	Ateneo school colors	UP school colors
UP	UST school colors	Ateneo school colors	UE school colors	La Salle school colors	Adamson school colors	FEU school colors	NU school colors	Adamson school colors	UST school colors	La Salle school colors	NU school colors	Ateneo school colors	FEU school colors	UE school colors
UST	UP school colors	Adamson school colors	NU school colors	FEU school colors	Ateneo school colors	La Salle school colors	UE school colors	Ateneo school colors	UP school colors	NU school colors	UE school colors	Adamson school colors	La Salle school colors	FEU school colors

= Win; = OT win; = Win by forfeit; = Loss; = OT loss; = Loss by forfeit

==== Scores ====
Teams	AdU	AdMU	DLSZ	FEU	NU	UE	UP	UST
Adamson Baby Falcons	—	64–82	62–58	91–96	82–92	83–65	86–55	69–78
Ateneo Blue Eaglets	64–47	—	87–63	59–47	64–49	97–47	78–58	94–63
Zobel Junior Archers	51–75	73–93	—	67–71	61–94	?–?	79–73	72–83
FEU–D Baby Tamaraws	72–71	65–68	87–86	—	68–80	86–68	90–63	79–82
NUNS Bullpups	73–62	68–78	85–67	86–81	—	0–20 (Note: NU originally won 107–69. However, the UAAP forfeited NSNU's win since they fielded an ineligible player.)	103–79	89–85
UE Junior Red Warriors	66–72	74–101	74–93	63–91	64–83	—	81–83	99–106
UPIS Junior Fighting Maroons	58–76	75–90	71–69	56–65	60–91	85–94	—	62–97
UST Tiger Cubs	74–91	54–78	79–86	64–62	75–109	88–76	87–91	—

Legend: Blue = left column team win; Red = top row team win.
Matches with lighter background shading were decided after overtime.

=== Fourth seed playoff ===
February 14
10:00 a.m.PHT

Report

Adamson Baby Falcons	72–73 (OT)	UST Tiger Cubs
Scoring by quarter: 14–16, 9–16, 21–15, 19–16, Overtime: 9–10
Pts: Sabandal 20; Rebs: Manlapaz 11; Asts: Sabandal 9		Pts: Cansino 24; Rebs: Lina 12; Asts: Cansino 6
UST advances to the Final Four

Blue Eagle Gym, Quezon City
Referees: Art Herrera, Nestor Sambrano, Mollie de Luna

=== Bracket ===
Stepladder round 1 (Single-elimination)
3	FEU–D	80
4	UST	81

Stepladder round 2 (No. 2 twice-to-beat)
2	NSNU	91
4	UST	72

Finals (Best-of-three playoff)
1	Ateneo	86	67	63
2	NSNU	70	70	58

=== Stepladder semifinals ===
==== (3) FEU Diliman vs. (4) UST ====
February 17
10:00 a.m.PHT

Report

FEU–D Baby Tamaraws	80–81	UST Tiger Cubs
Scoring by quarter: 15–20, 26–16, 21–17, 18–28
Pts: Abarrientos 24; Rebs: Tolentico 11; Asts: Alforque, Gonzalez 7 each		Pts: Cansino 18; Rebs: Cansino, Lina 16 each Asts: Cansino 5
UST advances to the stepladder semifinals round 2

Blue Eagle Gym, Quezon City
Referees: Ian Borbe, Edmar Avis, VC Jaramillo

==== (2) NSNU vs. (4) UST ====
NU has the twice-to-beat advantage

S+A

February 20
4:00 p.m.PHT

Report

NUNS Bullpups	91–72	UST Tiger Cubs
Scoring by quarter: 21–17, 24–14, 22–20, 24–21
Pts: Fortea 17; Rebs: Javillonar 16; Asts: Manalang 6		Pts: Baquial, Villapando 16 each Rebs: Cansino 16; Asts: Cansino 7
NU wins series in one game

Filoil Flying V Centre, San Juan City
Referees: Mollie de Luna, Julius Medillo, Irewin Traballo

=== Finals ===
S+A

February 23
4:00 p.m.PHT

Report

Ateneo Blue Eaglets	86–70	NUNS Bullpups
Scoring by quarter: 11–17, 20–14, 30–20, 25–19
Pts: Sotto 22; Rebs: Sotto 16; Asts: Belangel 8		Pts: Fortea 21; Rebs: Amsali 11; Asts: Manalang 3

Filoil Flying V Centre, San Juan City
Referees: Ian Borbe, Eric Viray, Dela Cruz

S+A

February 27
4:00 p.m.PHT

Report

Ateneo Blue Eaglets	67–70	NUNS Bullpups
Scoring by quarter: 21–21, 14–13, 13–13, 19–23
Pts: Ildefonso 14; Rebs: Ildefonso 13; Asts: Manuel 4		Pts: Oczon 17; Rebs: Amsali 13; Asts: Manalang 4

Filoil Flying V Centre, San Juan City
Referees: A. Dasal, Julius Medillo, Irewin Traballo

S+A

March 2
4:00 p.m.PHT

Report

Ateneo Blue Eaglets	63–58	NUNS Bullpups
Scoring by quarter: 15–6, 13–17, 16–20, 19–15
Pts: Sotto 19; Rebs: Sotto 13; Asts: Credo 4		Pts: Fortea 14; Rebs: 3 players 9 each Asts: 3 players 3 each
Ateneo wins series, 2–1

Filoil Flying V Centre, San Juan City
Referees: Mollie de Luna, Baria, Nestor Sambrano

- Finals Most Valuable Player: Kai Zachary Sotto (Ateneo Blue Eaglets)

The Ateneo Blue Eaglets' 7'1" center Kai Sotto recorded a triple-double in their Game 1 win over the NU Bullpups in their best-of-three Finals series on February 23, 2018. Sotto tallied 22 points, 16 rebounds and 11 blocks. Of those 11 shot-blocks, five were made in the first half.

=== Awards ===
UAAP Season 80 juniors' basketball champions
Ateneo Blue Eaglets
19th title

- Most Valuable Player: Crispin John Cansino (UST Tiger Cubs)
- Rookie of the Year:
- Mythical Five:
  - Crispin John Cansino (UST Tiger Cubs)
  - Kai Zachary Sotto (Ateneo Blue Eaglets)
  - Samjosef Belangel (Ateneo Blue Eaglets)
  - Sean Dave Ildefonso (Ateneo Blue Eaglets)
  - Louell Jay Gonzales (FEU–D Baby Tamaraws)

=== Statistics ===
==== Players' statistical points ====
#	Player	Team	Total
1	(Philippines) Crispin John Cansino	UST Tiger Cubs	88.43
2	(Philippines) Kyle Zachary Sotto	Ateneo Blue Eaglets	70.21
3	(Philippines) Samjosef Belangel	Ateneo Blue Eaglets	68.86
4	(Philippines) Sean David Ildefonso	Ateneo Blue Eaglets	64.21
5	(Philippines) Louell Jay Gonzales	FEU–D Baby Tamaraws	

Source: ABS-CBN Sports

== Overall Championship points ==
=== Seniors' division ===
Team	Men	Women	Total
Ateneo Blue Eagles	15	4	19
NU Bulldogs	4	15	19
Adamson Soaring Falcons	10	6	16
FEU Tamaraws	8	8	16
De La Salle Green Archers	12	2	14
UE Red Warriors	2	12	14
UST Growling Tigers	1	10	11
UP Fighting Maroons	6	1	7

Pts.	Ranking
15	Champion
12	2nd
10	3rd
8	4th
6	5th
4	6th
2	7th
1	8th
—	Did not join
WD	Withdrew

In case of a tie, the team with the higher position in any tournament is ranked higher. If both are still tied, they are listed by alphabetical order.

How rankings are determined:

- Ranks 5th to 8th determined by elimination round standings.
- Loser of the #1 vs #4 semifinal match-up is ranked 4th
- Loser of the #2 vs #3 semifinal match-up is ranked 3rd
- Loser of the finals is ranked 2nd
- Champion is ranked 1st

== See also ==
- NCAA Season 93 basketball tournaments

Preceded by Season 79 (2016)	UAAP basketball seasons Season 80 (2017)	Succeeded by Season 81 (2018)
