= 2017 Filoil Flying V Preseason Premier Cup =

Men's Finals	G1	Wins
San Beda Red Lions	75	1
De La Salle Green Archers	72	0
- Duration: May 1 - June 25, 2017
- Arena(s): Filoil Flying V Centre
- Winning coach: Boyet Fernandez (1st title)
- Semifinalists: Lyceum Pirates (3rd place); JRU Heavy Bombers
Juniors' Finals	G1	Wins
Malayan Red Robins	89	1
Ateneo Blue Eaglets	82	0
- Duration: May 1 - June 25, 2017
- Arena(s): Filoil Flying V Centre
- Semifinalists: NUNS Bullpups (3rd place); UST Tiger Cubs

The 2017 Filoil Flying V Preseason Premier Cup is the twelfth preseason high school and collegiate basketball tournament organized by Filoil Flying V Sports.

This is the only year that the cup was not televised after its former broadcast partner ABS-CBN Sports parted ways with the tournament organizers Filoil Flying V Sports at the end of the last year's edition of the tournament; the television broadcast of the tournament officially returned to ESPN 5 in the following year.

== Teams ==
Legend
NCAA team	UAAP team

=== Seniors' Division ===
Senior A
Ateneo Blue Eagles
Letran Knights
De La Salle Green Archers
JRU Heavy Bombers
Lyceum Pirates
San Beda Red Lions
UE Red Warriors
Perpetual Altas
UST Growling Tigers

Senior B
Adamson Soaring Falcons
Arellano Chiefs
Benilde Blazers
EAC Generals
FEU Tamaraws
Mapúa Cardinals
NU Bulldogs
San Sebastian Stags
UP Fighting Maroons

=== Juniors' Division ===
Junior A
Ateneo Blue Eaglets
Letran Squires
La Salle Green Hills Greenies
Lyceum Junior Pirates
NUNS Bullpups
San Beda Red Cubs

Junior B
FEU–D Baby Tamaraws
JRU Light Bombers
Malayan Red Robins
UE Junior Warriors
UPIS Junior Maroons
UST Tiger Cubs

== Tournament format ==
Due to different number of groups in men's and juniors' division, each has its own competition format.

=== Men's division ===
The tournament format for men's division are as follows:

- During elimination round, teams will only play against teams in their group in a single round-robin schedule.
- At the end of the eliminations, the top four teams in each group will advance to the quarterfinal round.
- At the quarterfinals:
  - Seeds #1 in group A meets #4 of group B (QF1)
  - Seeds #2 in group B meets #3 of group A (QF2)
  - Seeds #1 in group B meets #4 of group A (QF3)
  - Seeds #2 in group A meets #3 of group B (QF4)
- Winner of QF1 meets winner of QF2 while QF3 winner meets QF4 winner in the semifinals.
- Winners of the semifinals will play for the Final round, while losers will battle for third place.
- The quotient system shall be applied in case of a tie in the standings between two or more teams.
- Only one foreign player shall play at a time in the court.

=== Juniors' division ===
The tournament format for junior's division are as follows:

- During elimination round, teams will only play against teams in their group in a single round-robin schedule.
- The top six teams in overall standings, regardless of the group, will play for the quarterfinal round. The seeds #1 and #2 teams automatically advances to the semifinals.
- At the quarterfinals, team #3 meets #6 while #4 meets #5.
- At the semifinals, winners of the playoffs between #3 and #6 will face team #1, while #2 will play against the winner between #4 and #5.
- Winners of the semifinals will play for the Final round, while losers will battle for third place.
- The quotient system shall be applied in case of a tie in the standings between two or more teams.

== Men's division ==
=== Elimination round ===
==== Group A ====
===== Team standings =====
#	Team	W	L	PCT	GB	Tie
1	San Beda Red Lions	8	0	1.000	–	
2	Lyceum Pirates	6	2	.750	2	
3	JRU Heavy Bombers	5	3	.625	3	+4
4	De La Salle Green Archers	5	3	.625	3	−4
5	Ateneo Blue Eagles	4	4	.500	4	
6	Perpetual Altas	3	5	.375	5	+4
7	UE Red Warriors	3	5	.375	5	−4
8	Letran Knights	1	7	.125	7	+8
9	UST Growling Tigers	1	7	.125	7	−8

Qualified to the quarterfinals

===== Schedule =====
Team ╲ Game	1	2	3	4	5	6	7	8
Ateneo	Lyceum school colors	UE school colors	UST school colors	Letran school colors	La Salle school colors	UPHD school colors	JRU school colors	San Beda school colors
Letran	Ateneo school colors	Lyceum school colors	UPHD school colors	JRU school colors	UST school colors	UE school colors	San Beda school colors	La Salle school colors
La Salle	JRU school colors	UPHD school colors	UST school colors	Lyceum school colors	UE school colors	San Beda school colors	Ateneo school colors	Letran school colors
JRU	La Salle school colors	UE school colors	Letran school colors	Lyceum school colors	UPHD school colors	UST school colors	Ateneo school colors	San Beda school colors
Lyceum	Ateneo school colors	Letran school colors	La Salle school colors	UE school colors	JRU school colors	San Beda school colors	UPHD school colors	UST school colors
San Beda	Lyceum school colors	UE school colors	La Salle school colors	UPHD school colors	UST school colors	Letran school colors	JRU school colors	Ateneo school colors
UE	Ateneo school colors	JRU school colors	UST school colors	Lyceum school colors	UPHD school colors	San Beda school colors	La Salle school colors	Letran school colors
Perpetual	La Salle school colors	Letran school colors	UST school colors	UE school colors	JRU school colors	Lyceum school colors	San Beda school colors	Ateneo school colors
UST	Ateneo school colors	La Salle school colors	UE school colors	UPHD school colors	JRU school colors	Letran school colors	San Beda school colors	Lyceum school colors

= Win; = OT win; = Loss; = OT loss

===== Results =====
Team	ADMU	CSJL	DLSU	JRU	LPU	SBC	UE	UPHSD	UST
Ateneo		78–76	80–78	59–51	89–90	67–82	71–72	59–60	89–72
Letran			77–93	74–82	90–99	63–75	77–81	87–88	89–81
La Salle				85–81	121–119*	80–82	77–71	94–71	109–81
JRU					87–95	57–73	67–62	70–56	61–55
Lyceum						79–96	96–80	89–73	127–88
San Beda							68–55	64–61*	86–59
UE								68–72	104–63
Perpetual									55–63
UST									

Legend: Blue = left column team win; Red = top row team win.
Matches with lighter background shading were decided after overtime.
- Number of asterisks (*) denotes the number of overtime periods.

==== Group B ====
===== Team standings =====
#	Team	W	L	PCT	GB	Tie
1	FEU Tamaraws	7	1	.875	–	
2	Adamson Soaring Falcons	6	2	.750	1	+3
3	San Sebastian Stags	6	2	.750	1	−3
4	UP Fighting Maroons	5	3	.625	2	
5	NU Bulldogs	4	4	.500	3	+3
6	Arellano Chiefs	4	4	.500	3	−3
7	EAC Generals	3	5	.375	4	
8	Benilde Blazers	1	7	.125	6	
9	Mapúa Cardinals	0	8	.000	7	

Qualified to the quarterfinals

===== Schedule =====
Team ╲ Game	1	2	3	4	5	6	7	8
Adamson	Arellano school colors	SSC-R school colors	Mapua school colors	CSB school colors	NU school colors	EAC school colors	UP school colors	FEU school colors
Arellano	Adamson school colors	NU school colors	FEU school colors	EAC school colors	SSC-R school colors	CSB school colors	Mapua school colors	UP school colors
Benilde	Mapua school colors	SSC-R school colors	Adamson school colors	FEU school colors	UP school colors	EAC school colors	Arellano school colors	NU school colors
EAC	NU school colors	SSC-R school colors	Adamson school colors	UP school colors	CSB school colors	Arellano school colors	FEU school colors	Mapua school colors
FEU	CSB school colors	Arellano school colors	NU school colors	Mapua school colors	UP school colors	Adamson school colors	EAC school colors	SSC-R school colors
Mapúa	CSB school colors	Adamson school colors	NU school colors	UP school colors	SSC-R school colors	FEU school colors	Arellano school colors	EAC school colors
NU	EAC school colors	Arellano school colors	Mapua school colors	Adamson school colors	FEU school colors	SSC-R school colors	CSB school colors	UP school colors
San Sebastian	Adamson school colors	CSB school colors	EAC school colors	Mapua school colors	NU school colors	Arellano school colors	UP school colors	FEU school colors
UP	Mapua school colors	CSB school colors	EAC school colors	Adamson school colors	FEU school colors	SSC-R school colors	Arellano school colors	NU school colors

= Win; = OT win; = Loss; = OT loss

===== Results =====
Team	AdU	AU	CSB	EAC	FEU	MU	NU	SSC	UP
Adamson		61–56*	70–59	73–76*	53–72	74–68	78–72	64–61	58–50
Arellano			67–63	95–92	81–87	68–58	79–82	63–71	73–68
Benilde				70–78	67–73	64–49	88–104	68–76	77–70
EAC					61–68	79–71	85–87	54–79	59–61
FEU						99–84	88–77	84–80	68–71
Mapúa							80–85	67–76	72–80
NU								82–86	56–59
San Sebastian									64–51
UP									

Legend: Blue = left column team win; Red = top row team win.
Matches with lighter background shading were decided after overtime.
- Number of asterisks (*) denotes the number of overtime periods.

=== Bracket ===
Quarter-finals
(A1) San Beda	65
(B4) UP	56
(B2) Adamson	56
(A3) JRU	67
(B1) FEU	53
(A4) La Salle	78
(A2) Lyceum	86
(B3) San Sebastian	71

Semi-finals
(A1) San Beda	80
(A3) JRU	61
(A4) La Salle	100
(A2) Lyceum	99

Final
(A1) San Beda	75
(A4) La Salle	72
Third place
(A2) Lyceum	82
(A3) JRU	75

=== Quarterfinals ===
All times are local (UTC+8).

June 21, 2017
11:15 AM

Lyceum Pirates	86–71	San Sebastian Stags
Scoring by quarter: 16–16, 27–19, 20–14, 23–22
Pts: Pretta 17, Perez 14, Baltazar 11		Pts: Gayosa 14, Calma 9, Are 9
Lyceum advances to Semi-finals.

Filoil Flying V Arena, San Juan

June 21, 2017
1:30 PM

JRU Heavy Bombers	67–56	Adamson Soaring Falcons
Scoring by quarter: 23–11, 17–16, 13–11, 14–18
Pts: Teodoro 23, Grospe 16, Mendoza 9		Pts: Sarr 19, Ahanmisi 15, Manganti 11
JRU advances to Semi-finals.

Filoil Flying V Arena, San Juan

June 21, 2017
3:15 PM

San Beda Red Lions	65–56	UP Fighting Maroons
Scoring by quarter: 15–9, 12–17, 18–7, 20–23
Pts: Bolick 17, Presbitero 14, Noah 10		Pts: Quattara 22, Dario 6, Manzo 6
San Beda advances to Semi-finals.

Filoil Flying V Arena, San Juan

June 21, 2017
5:00 PM

De La Salle Green Archers	78–53	FEU Tamaraws
Scoring by quarter: 20–11, 15–11, 22–19, 21–12
Pts: Mbala 32, Melecio 13, Rivero 13		Pts: Tolentino 10, Escoto 10, Inigo 6
La Salle advances to Semi-finals.

Filoil Flying V Arena, San Juan

=== Semifinals ===
All times are local (UTC+8).

San Beda Red Lions	80–64	JRU Heavy Bombers
Scoring by quarter: 12–17, 21–12, 23–18, 24–17
Pts: Bolick 22, Noah 16, Soberano 14		Pts: Grospe 17, Poutouchi 12, Dela Virgen 10
San Beda advances to the Finals.

Filoil Flying V Arena, San Juan

Lyceum Pirates	99–100	De La Salle Green Archers
Scoring by quarter: 15–23, 32–22, 26–32, 26–23
Pts: Perez 24, Baltazar 19, Tansingco 15		Pts: Melecio 30, R. Rivero 27, Mbala 26
La Salle advances to the Finals.

Filoil Flying V Arena, San Juan

=== Battle for Third ===
All times are local (UTC+8).

June 25, 2017
2:00 PM

JRU Heavy Bombers	75–82	Lyceum Pirates

Filoil Flying V Arena, San Juan

=== Final ===
All times are local (UTC+8).

June 25, 2017
4:00 PM

San Beda Red Lions	75–72	De La Salle Green Archers
Scoring by quarter: 16–19, 19–17, 16–19, 24–17

Filoil Flying V Center, San Juan City

== Juniors' division ==
=== Elimination round ===
==== Group A ====
===== Team standings =====
#	Team	W	L	PCT	GB	Tie
1	Ateneo Blue Eaglets	4	1	0.800	—	+10
2	NUNS Bullpups	4	1	0.800	—	−10
3	Lyceum Junior Pirates	3	2	0.600	1	
4	San Beda Red Cubs	2	3	0.400	2	
5	La Salle Green Hills Greenies	1	4	0.200	3	+17
6	Letran Squires	1	4	0.200	3	−17

Qualified to the semi-finals
Source: Philsports.ph

===== Schedule =====
Team ╲ Game	1	2	3	4	5
ADMU	San Beda school colors	NU school colors	Letran school colors	CSB school colors	Lyceum school colors
CSJL	NU school colors	CSB school colors	Ateneo school colors	San Beda school colors	Lyceum school colors
LSGH	NU school colors	San Beda school colors	Letran school colors	Lyceum school colors	Ateneo school colors
LPU–C	San Beda school colors	CSB school colors	NU school colors	Letran school colors	Ateneo school colors
NSNU	CSB school colors	Letran school colors	Ateneo school colors	Lyceum school colors	San Beda school colors
SBC–R	Ateneo school colors	CSB school colors	Lyceum school colors	Letran school colors	NU school colors

= Win; = Loss

===== Results =====
Team	ADMU	CSJL	LSGH	LPU-C	NSNU	SBC-R
ADMU		97–95	70–62	97–106	76–66	73–66
CSJL			60–77	69–81	69–75	81–78
LSGH				72–86	70–73	82–100
LPU–C					95–103	76–88
NSNU						103–97
SBC–R						

Legend: Blue = left column team win; Red = top row team win.
Matches with lighter background shading were decided after overtime.
- Number of asterisks (*) denotes the number of overtime periods.

==== Group B ====
===== Team standings =====
#	Team	W	L	PCT	GB	Tie
1	FEU–D Baby Tamaraws	0	0	0.000	–	
2	JRU Light Bombers	0	0	0.000	–	
3	Malayan Red Robins	0	0	0.000	–	
4	UE Junior Warriors	0	0	0.000	–	
5	UPIS Junior Maroons	0	0	0.000	–	
6	UST Tiger Cubs	0	0	0.000	–	

Qualified to the quarterfinals

===== Schedule =====
Team ╲ Game	1	2	3	4	5
FEU–D					
JRU					
MHSS					
UE					
UPIS					
UST					

= Win; = Loss

===== Results =====
Team	FEU-D	JRU	MHSS	UE	UPIS	UST
FEU–D		–	60–58	–	–	–
JRU			–	–	–	71–79
MHSS				–	–	–
UE					–	–
UPIS						–
UST						

Legend: Blue = left column team win; Red = top row team win.
Matches with lighter background shading were decided after overtime.
- Number of asterisks (*) denotes the number of overtime periods.

=== Bracket ===
Semifinals
A1	Ateneo	79
B2	UST	67
B1	Malayan	72
A2	NSNU	67

Finals
A1	Ateneo	82
B1	Malayan	89
Battle for Third
B2	UST	75
A2	NSNU	86

=== Semifinals ===
All times are local (UTC+8).

Filoil Flying V Arena, San Juan

Filoil Flying V Arena, San Juan

=== Battle for Third ===
All times are local (UTC+8).

Filoil Flying V Arena, San Juan

=== Final ===
All times are local (UTC+8).

Filoil Flying V Arena, San Juan
