= Ben Mbala =

Cameroonian basketball player

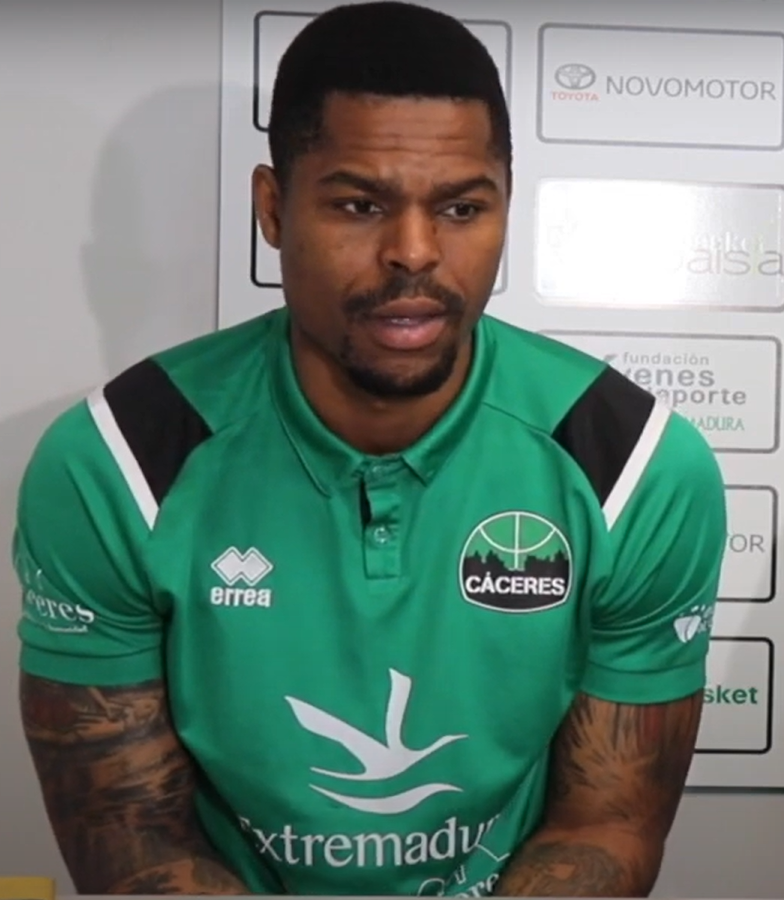
- Mbala with Cáceres Ciudad in 2022

No. 0 – Cedi Osman Basket
- Position: Power forward / center
- League: TBL

Personal information
- Born: July 13, 1995 (age 31) Yaoundé, Cameroon
- Listed height: 2.03 m (6 ft 8 in)
- Listed weight: 104 kg (229 lb)

Career information
- College: SWU (2012–2013); De La Salle (2016–2017)
- Playing career: 2017–present

Career history
- 2017–2018: Fuerza Regia de Monterrey
- 2018: Chorale Roanne
- 2018: Seoul Samsung Thunders
- 2018–2019: Aix Maurienne Savoie
- 2019–2021: Limoges
- 2021: Aix Maurienne Savoie
- 2021–2022: Cáceres Ciudad
- 2022–2023: Ormanspor
- 2023–2024: Iğdır Basketbol
- 2024–2026: Champagne Basket
- 2026: Quimper Rams
- 2026–present: Cedi Osman Basket

Career highlights
- UAAP champion (2016); CESAFI champion (2012); 2x UAAP Most Valuable Player (2016, 2017); 2x UAAP Mythical Team (2016, 2017); Filoil Flying V Preseason Cup champion (2016); 2x Filoil Flying V Preseason Cup MVP (2016, 2017); 2x Filoil Flying V Preseason Cup Mythical 5 (2016, 2017)

Benoit Mbala (born July 13, 1995) is a Cameroonian professional basketball player for Cedi Osman Basket of the Türkiye Basketbol Ligi (TBL). He played college basketball in the Philippines, playing for the SWU Cobras of the Cebu Schools Athletic Foundation, Inc. (CESAFI) and the De La Salle Green Archers of the University Athletic Association of the Philippines (UAAP).

== Early life and career ==
Mbala is a native of Yaoundé, Cameroon. He was first into football until the age of 13 when he grew about 6 feet 2 inches tall and switched to playing basketball. His older brother who manages the junior team of their municipality urged him to play for the team. He attended Institute Ndi Samba for his high school studies and made attempts to join his school's varsity team on his first two years. He continued to play for his municipality's team and managed to play for his high school in his last two years of secondary education.

Mbala participated twice at an annual national basketball camp organized by Luc Mbah a Moute. He failed in his goal of making the All-Star Selection on his first year of participation but achieved it on his second try when he was chosen as one of the top 20 players of the camp. He was further declared as one of the top five players of the Mbah a Moute's camp, which gave him the opportunity to participate in the Basketball Without Borders camp in Johannesburg, South Africa in 2011.

At the South African Basketball Without Borders camp, he won the African MVP Honors. His feat would have enabled him to study in the United States under a scholarship but visa issues prevented him from studying there.

== College career ==
=== Southwestern University ===
Moustapha Arafat, a former player of the University of the East in Manila invited Mbala to play basketball in the Philippines. He heeded to the invitation and went to study and play for the Southwestern University (SWU) Cobras of the Cebu Schools Athletic Foundation, Inc. (CESAFI) in 2012. In his lone season with the Cobras, Mbala led SWU to its first CESAFI title in school history, winning over archrival University of the Visayas (UV) Green Lancers. At the 2012 Philippine Collegiate Champions League he led the Cobras to a fourth-place finish, scoring 41 points in an upset win against the University of Santo Tomas (UST) Growling Tigers.

=== De La Salle University ===
He was recruited by the De La Salle University (DLSU) Green Archers of the University Athletic Association of the Philippines (UAAP), after Mbala led SWU to victory in a match against DLSU in a summer tournament in Manila in 2012. Mbala played for De La Salle at the University Athletic Association of the Philippines basketball tournament. Mbala originally planned to study and play for De La Salle's archrivals Ateneo de Manila University.

As a transfer student, Mbala had to sit out two years as part of his residency. An additional one-year ban was imposed on him by the UAAP after he played at the Pacquiao Challenge Cup in December 2014, where he was compensated monetarily, which was against the collegiate league's rules for players serving residency which caused him not to play for his school at UAAP Season 78. He was named part of the Mythical Five at the 2016 Filoil Flying V Preseason Premier Cup which was won by his team.

At Season 79, Mbala made his UAAP debut for De La Salle, and led the team to an 8–0 record halfway through the tournament and was the favorite to become the first foreigner to win the MVP Award since Anthony Williams of the FEU Tamaraws bagging the award in 1981 and he is the first Lasallian to win the MVP award since Don Allado who last won the said award in 1999. He was also the MVP in Season 80 despite De La Salle losing to Ateneo in the finals.

On 22 December 2017, Mbala announced his decision to not use his final year of eligibility and leave La Salle after five years. Mbala had one year of eligibility left to play for De La Salle in Season 81. However his stint was uncertain since the UAAP board was set to discuss the "seven years out of high school" rule of the collegiate year which would have rendered him ineligible for the next season if the rule is abolished.

== Professional career ==
=== Fuerza Regia (2017–2018) ===
Two days before Mbala announced his intention to leave La Salle, Fuerza Regia already announced via Instagram that Mbala will play for them. Mbala had a one-month stint with Fuerza Regia. According to his own account, Mbala was hindered by his veteran teammates while with Fuerza which made him unhappy with his stay with the Mexican ball club.

=== Chorale Roanne (2018) ===
French ballclub Chorale Roanne of LNB Pro B announced they have signed Mbala mid-January 2018. For Roanne, Mbala played 25 games where he averaged 11.6 points on 54 percent shooting and made an average of 5.6 rebounds per game. Mbala was made a role player in Chorale Roanne and was offered a contract renewal. However Mbala decided to move to South Korea after accepting an offer from the Seoul Samsung Thunders.

=== Seoul Samsung Thunders (2018) ===
On July 9, 2018, the Seoul Samsung Thunders of the Korean Basketball League announced that they have signed Mbala.

=== Magnolia Hotshots ===
Mbala became a standby player for the Magnolia Hotshots of the Philippine Basketball Association during the 2018 PBA Governors' Cup due to their import Romeo Travis sustained an injury. However Travis' condition got better and was able to play through his injury and Mbala didn't play a single game for Magnolia.

=== Aix Maurienne Savoie Basket (2018–2019) ===
Mbala returned to France in late 2018 signing up for Aix Maurienne Savoie Basket which plays in the second tier of French basketball.

=== Limoges CSP (2019–2021) ===
On July 11, 2019, he has signed with CSP Limoges of the LNB Pro A.

=== Aix Maurienne Savoie Basket (2021–2022) ===
January 2021, Limoges and Ben Mbala mutually decided to end their contract. Ben returned to the club where he got his French exposure : Aix Maurienne Savoie Basket.

=== OGM Ormanspor (2022–2023) ===
On August 26, 2022, he has signed with OGM Ormanspor of the TBL.

== National team career ==
The Cameroon Basketball Federation sent a letter to Mbala in June 2016 inviting him to participate in a training camp in Yaounde, Cameroon and two tournaments in China as preparation of the Cameroon national basketball team's participation at the 2017 FIBA Africa Championship. As of that time, there were no rules in the UAAP preventing players to play for their national teams. While expressing gratitude for the invitation, Mbala declined as he did not want to risk his eligibility to play in the UAAP and had to maintain academic requirements to remain playing for his collegiate team.

It was announced on February 5, 2017, that the Cameroon national team has included Mbala in their 30-man pool for the qualifiers and main tournament of the 2017 FIBA Africa Championship. He played for the national team in the aforementioned continental tournament.

== Awards ==
On January 26, 2017, Mbala was named the Smart College Player of the Year Award at the Collegiate Basketball Awards.
