= 2016 Filoil Flying V Preseason Premier Cup =

Men's Finals	1	Wins
De La Salle Green Archers	86	1
Arellano Chiefs	74	0
- Duration: April 30 - June 12, 2016
- Arena(s): Filoil Flying V Centre
- Finals MVP: Ben Mbala
- Winning coach: Aldin Ayo
- Semifinalists: Ateneo Blue Eagles (3rd place); NU Bulldogs
- TV network(s): ABS-CBN Sports and Action
Juniors' Finals	G1	Wins
San Beda Red Cubs	84	1
Adamson Baby Falcons	76	0
- Arena(s): Filoil Flying V Centre
- Finals MVP: Samuel Abuhijle
- Semifinalists: NUNS Bullpups (3rd place); FEU–D Baby Tamaraws

The 2016 Filoil Flying V Preseason Premier Cup is the eleventh preseason high school and collegiate basketball tournament organized by Filoil Flying V Sports. The opening ceremonies was held on April 30, 2016 at the Filoil Flying V Centre in San Juan.

Former UAAP champions De La Salle Green Archers and former NCAA champions Arellano University Chiefs will head-to-head in the seniors division finals. At the end, the Green Archers won the championship over the Chiefs, 86-74.

This was their final television broadcast year with ABS-CBN Sports and Action after 10 years, as the television broadcast eventually returned to ESPN 5 beginning with the 2018 edition of the cup.

== Teams ==
Legend
NCAA team	UAAP team

=== Senior's ===
Senior A
Arellano Chiefs
EAC Generals
San Sebastian Stags
Perpetual Altas
FEU Tamaraws
UP Fighting Maroons
NU Bulldogs
Benilde Blazers

Senior B
Adamson Soaring Falcons
De La Salle Green Archers
Ateneo Blue Eagles
UE Red Warriors
Mapúa Cardinals
Lyceum Pirates
Letran Knights
San Beda Red Lions

=== Junior's ===
Junior A
EAC–ICA Brigadiers
Mapúa Red Robins
La Salle Green Hills Greenies
NUNS Bullpups
FEU–D Baby Tamaraws

Junior B
Ateneo Blue Eaglets
Adamson Baby Falcons
DLS–Santiago Zobel School Junior Archers
San Beda Red Cubs
Lyceum Junior Pirates

== Seniors' tournament ==
=== Elimination round ===
==== Group A ====
===== Team standings =====
#	Team	W	L	PCT	GB
1	Perpetual Altas	4	0	1.000	—
2	Arellano Chiefs	3	1	0.750	1.0
3	NU Bulldogs	3	1	0.750	1.0
4	UP Fighting Maroons	2	1	0.667	1.5
5	San Sebastian Stags	2	2	0.500	2.0
6	FEU Tamaraws	1	3	0.250	3.0
3	EAC Generals	0	3	0.000	3.5
2	Benilde Blazers	0	4	0.000	4.0

Qualified to the quarterfinals

===== Schedule =====
Team ╲ Game	1	2	3	4	5	6	7
Arellano	EAC school colors	FEU school colors	CSB school colors	UPHD school colors	SSC-R school colors	UP school colors	NU school colors
Benilde	NU school colors	SSC-R school colors	Arellano school colors	UP school colors	EAC school colors	FEU school colors	UPHD school colors
EAC	Arellano school colors	NU school colors	UPHD school colors	SSC-R school colors	UP school colors	CSB school colors	FEU school colors
FEU	SSC-R school colors	Arellano school colors	UP school colors	NU school colors	UPHD school colors	CSB school colors	EAC school colors
NU	CSB school colors	EAC school colors	UPHD school colors	SSC-R school colors	FEU school colors	Arellano school colors	UP school colors
Perpetual	UP school colors	NU school colors	EAC school colors	Arellano school colors	FEU school colors	SSC-R school colors	CSB school colors
San Sebastian	FEU school colors	CSB school colors	NU school colors	EAC school colors	Arellano school colors	UPHD school colors	UP school colors
UP	UPHD school colors	FEU school colors	CSB school colors	EAC school colors	Arellano school colors	SSC-R school colors	NU school colors

= Win; = OT win; = Loss; = OT loss

===== Results =====
Team	Arellano	Benilde	EAC	FEU	NU	Perpetual	San Sebastian	UP
Arellano		81–65	79–72	92–70	—	—		—
Benilde	—		—	—	54–59	—	46–59	—
EAC	—	—		—	—	—	—	—
FEU	—	—	—		—	—	77–64	61–67
NU	—	—	—	—		66–78	70–65	—
Perpetual	—	—	—	—	—		—	73–61
San Sebastian	—	—	—	—	—	—		—
UP	—	—	—	—	—	—	—	

Legend: Blue = left column team win; Red = top row team win.
Matches with lighter background shading were decided after overtime.
- Number of asterisks (*) denotes the number of overtime periods.

==== Group B ====
===== Team Standings =====
#	Team	W	L	PCT	GB
1	De La Salle Green Archers	2	0	1.000	—
2	San Beda Red Lions	0	0	0.000	—
3	UE Red Warriors	2	1	0.667	0.5
4	Letran Knights	1	1	0.500	1.0
5	Ateneo Blue Eagles	1	1	0.500	1.0
6	Mapúa Cardinals	1	1	0.500	1.0
7	Adamson Soaring Falcons	1	2	0.333	1.5
8	Lyceum Pirates	1	3	0.250	2.0

Qualified to the quarterfinals

===== Schedule =====
Team ╲ Game	1	2	3	4	5	6	7
Adamson	La Salle school colors	Ateneo school colors	Lyceum school colors	Letran school colors	Mapua school colors	San Beda school colors	UE school colors
Ateneo	UE school colors	Adamson school colors	Letran school colors	Lyceum school colors	San Beda school colors	Mapua school colors	La Salle school colors
La Salle	Adamson school colors	UE school colors	San Beda school colors	Mapua school colors	Letran school colors	Lyceum school colors	Ateneo school colors
Lyceum	Mapua school colors	Letran school colors	UE school colors	Adamson school colors	San Beda school colors	Ateneo school colors	La Salle school colors
Letran	Lyceum school colors	Mapua school colors	Adamson school colors	UE school colors	Ateneo school colors	La Salle school colors	San Beda school colors
Mapua	Lyceum school colors	Letran school colors	San Beda school colors	Adamson school colors	La Salle school colors	UE school colors	Ateneo school colors
San Beda	Mapua school colors	Lyceum school colors	La Salle school colors	UE school colors	Ateneo school colors	Adamson school colors	Letran school colors
UE	Ateneo school colors	La Salle school colors	Lyceum school colors	Letran school colors	San Beda school colors	Mapua school colors	Adamson school colors

= Win; = OT win; = Loss; = OT loss

===== Results =====
Team	Adamson	Ateneo	La Salle	Lyceum	Letran	Mapúa	San Beda	UE
Adamson		75–84	88–98	—	—	—	—	—
Ateneo	—		—	—	—	—	—	91–93*
La Salle	—	—		—	—	—	—	97–75
Lyceum	—	—	—		84–89	91–82	—	75–91
Letran	—	—	—	—		—	—	—
Mapúa	—	—	—	—	—		—	—
San Beda	—	—	—	—	—	—		—
UE	—	—	—	—	—	—	—	

Legend: Blue = left column team win; Red = top row team win.
Matches with lighter background shading were decided after overtime.
- Number of asterisks (*) denotes the number of overtime periods.

=== Bracket ===
Semi-finals
NU	85
Arellano	94
La Salle	92
Ateneo	77

Final
Arellano	74
La Salle	86
Battle-for-Third
NU	54
Ateneo	66

=== Semi-finals ===
ABS-CBN Sports and Action

June 9
2:00 p.m.

Report

NU Bulldogs	85–94	Arellano Chiefs
Scoring by quarter: 19–20, 28–20, 19–21, 25–27
Pts: Aroga 24		Pts: Jalalon 34

Filoil Flying V Centre, San Juan

ABS-CBN Sports and Action

June 9
4:00 p.m.

Report

De La Salle Green Archers	92–77	Ateneo Blue Eagles
Scoring by quarter: 27–14, 21–26, 18–16, 27–22
Pts: Torres 17		Pts: Black 24

Filoil Flying V Centre, San Juan

=== Battle-for-Third ===
ABS-CBN Sports and Action

June 12
2:00 p.m.

Report

NU Bulldogs	54–66	Ateneo Blue Eagles
Scoring by quarter: 20–8, 28–6, 12–16, 16–14
Pts: Mosqueda 9		Pts: Ikeh 18

Filoil Flying V Centre, San Juan

=== Final ===
ABS-CBN Sports and Action

June 12
4:00 p.m.

Report

Arellano Chiefs	74–86	De La Salle Green Archers
Scoring by quarter: 26–21, 16–19, 19–21, 16–25
Pts: Jalalon 28		Pts: Mbala 32

Filoil Flying V Centre, San Juan

== Juniors' tournament ==
=== Bracket ===
==== Battle-for-Third ====
June 12
10:00 a.m.

Report

Nazareth NU Bullpups	86–67	FEU-Diliman Baby Tamaraws
Scoring by quarter: 29–12, 12–18, 24–17, 21–20
Pts: Atienza 13		Pts: Abarrientos 15

Filoil Flying V Centre, San Juan

=== Final ===
June 12
12:00 p.m.

Report

San Beda–Rizal Red Cubs	84–76	Adamson Baby Falcons
Scoring by quarter: 19–14, 21–13, 12–29, 32–20
Pts: Etrata 24		Pts: Antiporda 18

Filoil Flying V Centre, San Juan

== Final standings ==
Juniors

Rank	Team
1st place, gold medalist(s)	San Beda-Rizal Red Cubs
2nd place, silver medalist(s)	Adamson Baby Falcons
3rd place, bronze medalist(s)	Nazareth NU Bullpups
4	FEU-Diliman Baby Tamaraws

Seniors

Rank	Team
1st place, gold medalist(s)	De La Salle Green Archers
2nd place, silver medalist(s)	Arellano Chiefs
3rd place, bronze medalist(s)	Ateneo Blue Eagles
4	NU Bulldogs
5	FEU Tamaraws
6	San Beda Red Lions
7	Adamson Soaring Falcons
8	Perpetual Altas

=== Individual awards ===
Juniors

- Most Valuable Player: Samuel Abuhijle ( San Beda)
- Mythical Five:
  - Samuel Abuhijle ( San Beda)
  - Evan Agbong ( Adamson)
  - Kenji Roman ( FEU)
  - John Lloyd Clemente ( NU)
  - Rhayyan Amsali ( NU)
- Best Defensive Player: Kenji Roman ( FEU)

Seniors

- Most Valuable Player: Ben Mbala ( La Salle)
- Mythical Five:
  - Ben Mbala ( La Salle)
  - Jeron Teng ( La Salle)
  - Michael Salado ( Arellano)
  - Abu Tratter ( La Salle)
  - Jio Jalalon ( Arellano)
- Best Defensive Player: Ben Mbala ( La Salle)
