= Ateneo–La Salle rivalry =

School rivalry in the Philippines

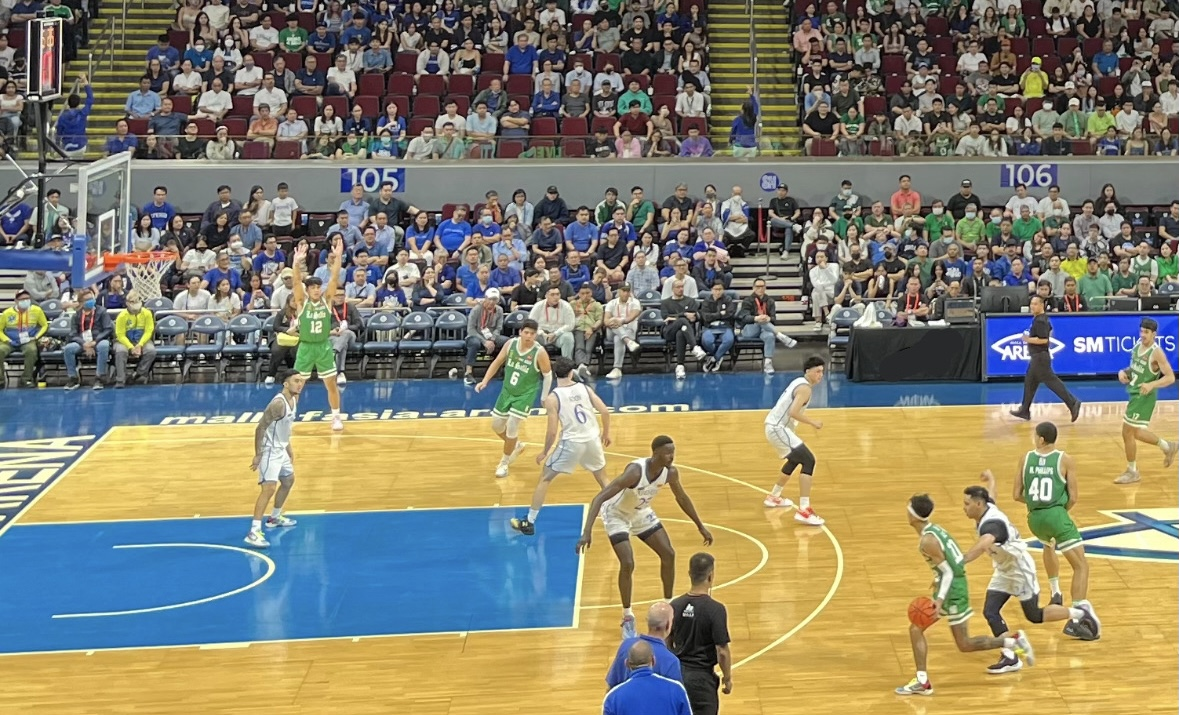
- Ateneo and La Salle in UAAP Season 86 basketball
- Sports: Various
- Location: Philippines
- Teams: Ateneo Blue Eagles; De La Salle Green Archers
- First meeting: 1924 (NCAA)
- Latest meeting: October 31, 2026 (UAAP)
- Stadiums: Smart Araneta Coliseum; SM Mall of Asia Arena

Statistics
- Most wins: La Salle (UAAP basketball, 51–50) (Note: Four Ateneo wins and seven La Salle wins from the 2003 to 2005 seasons were forfeited, but this only affected the championships, moreover nullity of title does not imply a win column to the opposition.)
- Largest victory: Ateneo: 25 points, 80–55 (September 14, 1996); La Salle: 24 points, 94–70 (July 15, 2000)

Locations of Ateneo and La Salle

The school rivalry between Ateneo de Manila University and De La Salle University began when both educational institutions participated in the National Collegiate Athletic Association (NCAA) and has carried over to the University Athletic Association of the Philippines (UAAP) where both universities compete in currently.

Beginning with UAAP Season 84 in May 2022, Ateneo de Manila University decided to unify student-athletes and varsity teams under the "Blue Eagles" moniker moving forward, regardless of sport, gender, or age group. Meanwhile, the Green Archer is the traditional mascot of De La Salle University and the varsity teams are collectively referred to as the "Green Archers", however, each team carries a specific moniker that references the sport that they play.

Ateneo and La Salle were both co-founders of the NCAA in 1924, until Ateneo left the league in 1978 to join the UAAP in the same year while La Salle announced its decision to leave the NCAA in a press conference in September 1980, effective after the then ongoing 1980–81 NCAA Season. Both Catholic private schools in the Metro Manila area have been competing against each other in the UAAP ever since La Salle was also admitted to join the league in 1986.

== History ==
The rivalry began in 1939 when Ateneo lost to La Salle in a hotly contested championship basketball game in NCAA Season 16 (1939–40). Basketball games between Ateneo and La Salle in the old NCAA were always hard-fought, but they were not yet tagged by local sportswriters as a recognized rivalry. The more popular collegiate sports rivalries in the NCAA were Ateneo versus San Beda and La Salle versus Letran.

When Ateneo and La Salle transferred to the UAAP in 1978 and 1986 respectively, they naturally continued their fierce battles and innate animosity against each other on and off-court, and the sports press began to recognize the rivalry. The rivalry started with the men's basketball games and has since expanded to other UAAP sports, particularly in women's volleyball where both teams fought head-to-head in the UAAP Finals for six consecutive times from 2012 to 2017. Both universities have also extended their rivalry beyond sports and have gone into academic competitions.

From 1924 to 1925, basketball games between Ateneo and La Salle were played at an open basketball court at the Padre Faura, Ermita campus of UP, and in 1926 at the Nozaleda Park (now called Agrifina Circle which is part of Luneta Park). The venue later moved to the covered courts of the US Army's 31st Infantry Gym and UST Gym. The games then moved to the pre-war Rizal Memorial Coliseum to accommodate bigger crowds, and at one point, the venues included the Ateneo Loyola Center, the Cuneta Astrodome, and the PhilSports Arena. Currently, the Smart Araneta Coliseum and the SM Mall of Asia Arena are the present main venues for their sold-out games.

== Head-to-head records by sport ==
=== Seniors' division ===
As of 2026, La Salle has more collegiate championships compared to Ateneo in the NCAA and UAAP combined, in both men's and women's divisions. La Salle has 201 collegiate titles whereas Ateneo has 123. La Salle also has eight General Collegiate Championships versus Ateneo with one General Collegiate Championship. This count excludes additional collegiate titles and the five General Collegiate Championships also won by De La Salle–College of Saint Benilde since it participated in the NCAA in 1998.

- 3x3 basketball – La Salle (4) – Ateneo (2)
- Athletics – La Salle (14) – Ateneo (9)
- Badminton – Ateneo (14) – La Salle (6)
- Baseball – Ateneo (6) – La Salle (6)
- Basketball – Ateneo (28) – La Salle (21)
- Beach Volleyball – Ateneo (1) – La Salle (1)
- Cheerdance – Ateneo (none) – La Salle (none)
- Chess
  - Standard – La Salle (16) – Ateneo (6)
  - Rapid – Ateneo (none) – La Salle (none)
  - Blitz – Ateneo (1) – La Salle (none)
- Esports
  - NBA 2K – Ateneo (2) – La Salle (none)
  - Valorant – La Salle (2) – Ateneo (none)
  - MLBB – La Salle (1) – Ateneo (none)
- Fencing – Ateneo (2) – La Salle (none)
- Football – La Salle (36) – Ateneo (14)
- Golf – La Salle (2) – Ateneo (none)
- Judo – Ateneo (8) – La Salle (2)
- Softball – La Salle (3) – Ateneo (1)
- Street dance – La Salle (4) – Ateneo (none)
- Swimming – Ateneo (18) – La Salle (17)
- Table tennis – La Salle (13) – Ateneo (none)
- Taekwondo Kyorugi – La Salle (10) – Ateneo (none)
- Taekwondo Poomsae – La Salle (3) – Ateneo (none)
- Tennis – La Salle (20) – Ateneo (2)
- Volleyball – La Salle (20) – Ateneo (9)

General (Overall) Championships
La Salle leads Ateneo in the number of General Championships in the seniors' division, 8–1. Note that all championships listed are NCAA General Championships and UAAP General Championships. La Salle won its first UAAP General Championship in the seniors' division in UAAP Season 75 (2012–13), and won two additional General Championship titles in UAAP Season 76 (2013–14), and UAAP Season 78 (2015–16).

- La Salle (8) – (5) NCAA: 1972–73, 1974–75, 1976–77, 1977–78, 1980–81; (3) UAAP: 2012–13, 2013–14, 2015–16
- Ateneo (1) – NCAA: 1968–69

=== Juniors' division ===
As of 2026, La Salle has 120 high school titles while Ateneo has 118. La Salle's juniors' team was represented first by DLSC High School from 1924 to 1967, followed by La Salle Green Hills (LSGH) from 1968 to 1981, and currently De La Salle Santiago Zobel School (DLSZ) since 1986. La Salle has 10 General High School Championships versus Ateneo with four General High School Championships. This count excludes the additional high school titles and the four General High School Championships won by La Salle Green Hills after it began to represent De La Salle–College of Saint Benilde in the NCAA Juniors division in 1998.

- 3x3 basketball
  - High School (19U) – Ateneo (none) – La Salle (none)
  - Junior High School (16U) – Ateneo (2) – La Salle (none)
- Athletics – Ateneo (34) – La Salle (14)
- Baseball – Ateneo (5) – La Salle (4)
- Basketball
  - High School (19U) – Ateneo (30) – La Salle (8)
  - Junior High School (16U) – Ateneo (none) – La Salle (none)
- Beach Volleyball – Ateneo (none) – La Salle (none)
- Chess – Ateneo (7) – La Salle (4)
- Fencing – Ateneo (2) – La Salle (none)
- Football – La Salle (31) – Ateneo (5)
- Judo – Ateneo (9) – La Salle (none)
- Softball – La Salle (8) – Ateneo (2)
- Swimming – La Salle (13) – Ateneo (12)
- Table tennis – La Salle (5) – Ateneo (1)
- Taekwondo Kyorugi – Ateneo (3) – La Salle (none)
- Tennis – La Salle (9) – Ateneo (none)
- Volleyball – La Salle (24) – Ateneo (6)

General (Overall) Championships
La Salle leads Ateneo in General High School Championship titles, 10–4. The first two General High School Championship titles of La Salle were won by DLSC High School while the next eight titles were won by La Salle Green Hills. Note that included are NCAA and UAAP General Championships.

- La Salle (10) – NCAA: 1965–66, 1966–67 (DLSC High School), 1971–72, 1973–74, 1974–75, 1975–76, 1977–78, 1978–79, 1979–80, 1980–81 (LSGH)
- Ateneo (4) – (2) NCAA: 1967–68, 1976–77; (2) UAAP: 2000–01, 2001–02

== Basketball ==
=== Overall ===
In terms of total collegiate and high school basketball titles won in the NCAA and UAAP, Ateneo leads La Salle, 58–29. In men's basketball, Ateneo has a total of 26 championship titles whereas La Salle has 16. The Blue Eagles have 14 NCAA titles and 12 UAAP titles while the Green Archers have five NCAA titles and 11 UAAP titles. In juniors' basketball, Ateneo has 11 NCAA titles and 19 UAAP titles, for a total of 30, whereas La Salle has six NCAA titles and two UAAP titles, for eight in total.

The Ateneo Blue Eagles and the De La Salle Green Archers have met in the championships of the NCAA and UAAP at least nine times. The Blue Eagles won the men's basketball title over La Salle in 1958, 1988, 2002, 2008, and 2017 whereas the Green Archers prevailed in 1939, 1974, 2001, and 2016. In women's basketball, both schools have only won titles in the UAAP as the NCAA does not have a women's basketball tournament, where La Salle leads Ateneo, 5–2. In the juniors' division, the De La Salle Junior Archers defeated the top-seeded Ateneo Blue Eaglets in 2007. In 2009, the Eaglets defeated the top-seeded Junior Archers.

=== Collegiate titles of national scope ===
In terms of collegiate titles of national scope, Ateneo leads with five titles to La Salle's three. Ateneo won the Collegiate Champions League (CCL) title in 2007, and won back to back titles in the Philippine Collegiate Championship League (PCCL) in the 2009 and 2010 seasons, as well as in the 2018 and 2019 seasons. La Salle won the Philippine Intercollegiate Championship in 1988 and the Philippine Collegiate Championship in 2008 and 2013 against Ateneo and the South Western University Cobras, respectively.

Ateneo won the 2007 Collegiate Champions League title against the University of the Visayas Green Lancers, 71–54. The Collegiate Champions League (CCL), was then reformatted and became the Philippine Collegiate Championship League (PCCL). It is currently the national collegiate basketball championship tournament, sanctioned by the Samahang Basketbol ng Pilipinas, the country's official basketball federation. College teams from all over the country participate in the tournament. The tournament also has a Sweet 16 similar to the United States' NCAA basketball tournament during "March Madness."

The Green Archers won the 2008 PCCL title. La Salle defeated the second-seeded NCAA champion San Beda Red Lions and arranged a finals meeting with the top-seeded UAAP champion Ateneo Blue Eagles, who defeated the Letran Knights in the Final Four. In the championship match, the De La Salle Green Archers prevailed over the Ateneo Blue Eagles, 71–62.

In the 2009 season of the Philippine Collegiate Championship League, the Blue Eagles defeated the FEU Tamaraws in three games to clinch their second national title, whereas the Green Archers were eliminated by the Letran Knights in their first game in the round of 16. In the 2010 season, the Blue Eagles defeated the Adamson Soaring Falcons in three games to clinch their third and back-to-back national titles, while the Green Archers settled for 3rd-place beating the University of Cebu Webmasters despite having 4 players injured and only 10 players intact in the line-up.

In the 2013 season of the Philippine Collegiate Championship League, the Green Archers defeated the South Western University Cobras, via sweep to reclaim the national championship for the first time since 2008 and winning their second title in the tournament.

In the 2018 season of the Philippine Collegiate Championship League, the Blue Eagles defeated the University of the Visayas Green Lancers, 95–71 to reclaim the national championship for the first time since 2010 and winning their fourth title in the tournament. In the 2019 season, the Blue Eagles defeated the San Beda Red Lions 57–46 to win their fifth title in the PCCL.

=== Championship streaks ===
Ateneo was 3-peat NCAA champion from 1931 through 1933, and its record of 14 collegiate titles remained unsurpassed by any school in the NCAA until 2003. They currently hold the distinction of having the longest UAAP basketball title streak in the Final Four era after winning five straight times from 2008 to 2012. In 2019, Ateneo achieved another 3-peat and became the first team in the UAAP Final Four era to finish an entire season (including the finals) without a single loss (16–0) in the men's basketball tournament.

Both schools have also managed to post what are regarded as "double championships" by winning both the seniors and juniors titles in the same year. The Ateneo Blue Eagles still have the most number of double titles in NCAA history, with four double championships, including the NCAA's second back-to-back double championships in 1975 and 1976 (the first was accomplished by the University of the Philippines in 1925 and 1926).

Ateneo holds the distinction of being the only double 3-peat champion in the senior and junior levels whether in the NCAA or UAAP, from 2008 to 2010, and has posted two 4-peats and three back-to-back title streaks in the UAAP juniors' division.

La Salle does not have any such streaks in the NCAA, but won back-to-back titles once in 1989 and 1990, and also posted a 4-peat in UAAP men's basketball from 1998 to 2001. La Salle accomplished the double championship once during its stint in the NCAA (1939) and UAAP (2007).

The Lady Archers were able to duplicate the championship streak of the Green Archers and achieved a 4-peat of their own from 1999 to 2002, which was the longest UAAP women's basketball championship streak in the Final Four era until it was surpassed by the NU Lady Bulldogs when they won seven straight championships from 2014 to 2022.

La Salle holds the distinction of being the first and only school to be 3-peat UAAP basketball champions in both men's and women's divisions in the same period, from 1999 to 2001. In 2013, La Salle were champions in both divisions again in the UAAP Season 76 basketball tournaments.

=== NCAA ===
In 1939, La Salle defeated Ateneo in both the Seniors and Juniors NCAA Championship. The school rivalry reputedly started that year when after La Salle defeated Ateneo, then the defending champions, some Lasallians allegedly mocked Ateneans by throwing fried chicken outside the gates of the Ateneo Padre Faura campus in Manila. Ateneo and La Salle would not meet in the championship again until 1958 where Ateneo defeated La Salle by a basket in overtime. One last finals meeting of both schools took place when the third rubber match series occurred in 1974 with La Salle led by future Philippine Basketball Association star Lim Eng Beng prevailing over Ateneo in the championship. Ateneo and La Salle then left the NCAA in 1978 and 1981 respectively after games turned into full-blown riots with other schools, with Ateneo leaving after losing the 1978 championship against San Beda in closed doors, and La Salle after fan disturbance in their 1980 second-round game against Letran.

=== UAAP ===
1988: First Ateneo–La Salle finals in the UAAP

In 1988, Ateneo and La Salle met in their first finals match since 1974 when both teams still competed in the NCAA. Ateneo won, 76–70 at the Rizal Memorial Coliseum. Ateneo was led by Gilbert Reyes under head coach Fritz Gaston, while La Salle was led by Dindo Pumaren under head coach and older brother Derrick Pumaren. La Salle would win their first basketball championship in the UAAP the following year in Season 52, while Ateneo would not win another title until 14 years later in Season 65.

2001: La Salle secures fourth straight title

Game	Winner	Loser	Series
Game 1	La Salle 74	Ateneo 68	La Salle 1–0
Game 2	Ateneo 76	La Salle 72	Tied 1–1
Game 3	La Salle 93	Ateneo 88	La Salle 2–1

In 2001, La Salle was the defending three-time champion, while Ateneo were in a 13-year championship drought. La Salle won the game. At Game 2, Enrico Villanueva scored 22 points to lead the Eagles to a series-extending win. After Mike Cortez tying the game at 72–all, Villanueva passed the ball to teammate Magnum Membrere who scored a three-pointer. On the next possession, Renren Ritualo failed to answer with a game-tying three of his own to force a sudden-death Game 3, scoring Ateneo's first win against La Salle in the season after three games. In the deciding game, Carlo Sharma scored a UAAP career-high 22 points, 11 in the final quarter to prevent an Ateneo victory. Ateneo's rookie LA Tenorio had 30 points of his own but it was not enough, as La Salle coach Pumaren remarked that "This was the sweetest of the four championships because we're able to erase the stigma of our 1988 loss to Ateneo."

2002: Ateneo ends 14-year championship drought

Game	Winner	Loser	Series
Game 1	Ateneo 72	La Salle 70	Ateneo 1–0
Game 2	La Salle 85	Ateneo 77	Tied 1–1
Game 3	Ateneo 77	La Salle 70	Ateneo 2–1

In 2002 prior to the Finals, Ateneo prevented a 14–0 elimination round sweep of La Salle that would have given a bye up to the best-of-three Finals. Instead, Ateneo defeated La Salle in the elimination round finale 76–63. La Salle defeated rival University of Santo Tomas (UST), and Ateneo overcame No. 2 seed University of the East (UE) in two games, with the second game ending in a buzzer beater by Gec Chia to push Ateneo into the Finals anew.

Game 1 ended with Villanueva scoring Ateneo's last ten points, and teammate Larry Fonacier blocking two shots by Mark Cardona that would have forced overtime to give Ateneo a 1–0 series lead. In Game 2, with the Ateneo team noted as being "tense," La Salle had an 18-point lead at halftime, which Ateneo cut down to three, 80–77, but Sharma and Adonis Santa Maria converted crucial free-throws that gave La Salle enough breathing space to force another Game 3. In Game 3, La Salle player Mike Cortez shot just 2-of-13 from the field for 13 points, which caused La Salle students and alumni to accuse him of throwing the game, as Ateneo eventually won the title to deny La Salle a fifth consecutive championship.

2003–2005: Semifinals meetings

Ateneo and La Salle would play second fiddle to Far Eastern University (FEU) from 2003 to 2005, with the Tamaraws defeating Ateneo in 2003, losing to La Salle in 2004 and defeating La Salle in 2005.

Along the way, the two teams met in the semifinals, where the higher seed gets the twice-to-beat advantage. In 2003, La Salle forced No. 1 seed Ateneo into a rubber match after a 76–72 overtime win, with the game being halted after a brawl erupted between the two teams. With Ateneo's LA Tenorio and La Salle's Ryan Araña suspended for the deciding game, Ateneo eliminated La Salle from Finals contention in the deciding game with a 74–68 triumph.

In 2004, La Salle and Ateneo finished the elimination round tied for second place, so a playoff game was played to determine which team gets the twice-to-beat advantage. La Salle won the game, and ended Ateneo's season in the semifinals, to face FEU in the Finals. La Salle would win in three games to deny FEU which had defeated Ateneo a season before, a back-to-back championship run.

In 2005, three teams, La Salle, Ateneo and UE, were all tied for second place. La Salle won the tiebreaker with a superior point differential on games played by the three teams, causing Ateneo and UE to play for the right to face La Salle with the twice-to-win disadvantage in which the Eagles won. However, La Salle defeated Ateneo in the semifinals to clinch another Finals appearance against FEU.

2006: La Salle suspension

After FEU swept La Salle in the 2005 championship series, La Salle admitted it fielded two ineligible players from 2003 to 2005 albeit it claimed not to be aware of their ineligibility, which caused them to return the 2005 runner-up trophy and the 2004 championship trophy they won against FEU (the league would later award FEU the trophy). The league suspended La Salle in 2006 for a year due to negligence, with all of their games during that period also forfeited. Ateneo faced UST in the 2006 Finals, a series UST won in three games.

2007: "Two is Greater than Three"

Upon their return in 2007, UE swept the elimination round 14–0, with their last game against La Salle going into overtime with the Warriors still prevailing. With Ateneo also losing their last game, the two teams were again tied for second place, and La Salle won the playoff game to clinch the twice-to-beat advantage. Prior to this, Ateneo won the two elimination round games against La Salle.

Unlike earlier match-ups where the team with the advantage won the first game, Ateneo won the first game, with Chris Tiu playing pivotal roles in crunch time where he scored the winning lay-up with 7.3 seconds remaining to force a deciding game. In their fifth meeting of the season, Pocholo Villanueva scored a three-pointer to add La Salle's lead to nine with less than three minutes in the game left. After an Ateneo 6–2 run, Villanueva scored a jump-shot anew, padding the lead to seven. After Ford Arao later cut the lead to five, La Salle's OJ Cua missed two free-throws with 23.9 seconds remaining. Chris Tiu passed the ball to Nonoy Baclao who scored a three-pointer to cut the lead to two, but JVee Casio converted both of his free-throws with 4 seconds left to punch La Salle's ticket to the Finals. This had been the only time Ateneo and La Salle played for five games in a season without both the teams advancing to the Finals.

La Salle would eventually sweep UE in the Finals 2–0 to cap their seventh men's basketball championship. After the season, La Salle coach Franz Pumaren remarked that "This is the only time that two is greater than three, they beat us three times, but we beat them when it counted the most."

2008–2012: Ateneo wins five straight titles

Game	Winner	Loser	Series
Game 1	Ateneo 69	La Salle 61	Ateneo 1–0
Game 2	Ateneo 62	La Salle 51	Ateneo 2–0

Ateneo would later claim their fourth UAAP title in 2008 against defending champions La Salle by sweeping the finals series 2–0. In Game 1, Rabeh Al-Hussaini scored 31 points to lead Ateneo to a win. In Game 2, Ateneo led by 15 points at halftime, but La Salle rallied to cut the lead down to 50–47 at the end of the third quarter. However, La Salle forward Rico Maierhofer was ejected just before the end of the quarter after the officials said that he flashed the dirty finger. Maierhofer denied the charge and revealed nine years later in 2017 that he was actually signaling for a La Salle teammate to switch places. La Salle suffered a scoring drought which saw the lead balloon to eight in the last two minutes, and Ateneo never looked back after a Jai Reyes three-point play to secure Ateneo's fourth UAAP men's basketball title.

La Salle paraded several rookies for the 2009 season, while Ateneo emerged with only Chris Tiu as the major graduating player. With these conditions, the first Ateneo–La Salle game came at the heels of former President Corazon Aquino's death, and as a result, spectators wore yellow as a sign for respect for Aquino. Ateneo outlasted La Salle in overtime to end the first round with a solitary loss. The two teams met a week later, but this time Ateneo had a big enough lead to prevent La Salle from catching up. Ateneo qualified for the semifinals as the No. 1 seed, eventually winning the championship; La Salle missed out on the Final Four on the final day after being defeated by NU. The 2009 season would be the first time Ateneo and La Salle would not meet in the playoffs since 2001, not including their Finals encounter in 2008 and the DLSU suspension in 2006.

In 2010, parading some new players and an improved set of veterans, the Green Archers defeated the Blue Eagles, 66–63, with the Blue Eagles still feeling the loss of three of the previous season's starters and sophomore guard Sam Marata shooting hot in the end game. This was the first official win of the Green Archers against the Blue Eagles in UAAP action since 2007. In the second round encounter, the Ateneo Blue Eagles were threatened with falling into a tie in the standings had they lost to DLSU. After falling behind 4–9, the Blue Eagles went on a 10–0 scoring run to take a double digit lead, and went on to defeat the Archers decisively, 74–57.

2010 was the second straight year that Ateneo and DLSU would not meet in a post eliminations series. DLSU managed to reach the Final Four after missing it in the previous season, but fell to the top-seeded FEU Tamaraws in overtime. The Blue Eagles defeated the Adamson Falcons in the Final Four, and went on to sweep the Tamaraws for their third consecutive title despite not having any player in the Mythical Team.

In 2011, the Ateneo Blue Eagles team headlined by two rookies defeated DLSU again in both of their elimination matches. It is also the third straight year that Ateneo and DLSU would not meet in a post elimination series, since the DLSU Green Archers failed to qualify once again for the Final Four. The Ateneo Blue Eagles were the top-seeded team in the semifinals and defeated the UST Growling Tigers in one game. The Blue Eagles then proceeded to sweep the Finals series against the FEU Tamaraws, thus achieving its own four-peat.

Prior to the start of the 2012 season, Norman Black announced that this would be his last season as head coach of the Ateneo. La Salle, on the other hand, had a rookie coach in Gee Abanilla. The two schools met thrice that season – twice in the elimination and once in the semi-finals with Ateneo winning all of the games. A few days prior to the Final 4 match between Ateneo and La Salle, the Blue Eagle's patron, Manny Pangilinan, announced that he would be pulling out his support from the school. Despite the controversy, Ateneo eventually won its fifth consecutive title, sweeping UST in the Finals.

2013: La Salle reclaims the championship

Upon the departure of Norman Black, Dolreich "Bo" Perasol, a former member of the UP Fighting Maroons men's basketball team and a seasoned Philippine Basketball Association head coach, was tapped by Ateneo as head coach of the Blue Eagles. The entry of Perasol, who was rumored to be tapped as team consultant of the UP Fighting Maroons prior to his appointment as Ateneo head coach, also heralded the return of Manny Pangilinan as the Blue Eagles' main patron. Joining Ateneo men's basketball team was Filipino-American forward Chris Newsome.

Over at La Salle, a series of reshuffles within and outside of the team resulted to the appointment of then assistant coach Juno Sauler as the head coach of the Green Archers. Joining the De La Salle Green Archers coaching staff prior to the start of the 2013 season was Allan Caidic, who took on the chores of shooting coach. Filipino-American forwards Jason Perkins and Matthew Salem became a part of team roster, which had to adjust to the loss of resident players Yutien Andrada, Mac Tallo, Alfonzo Gotladera and Papot Paredes. For the first time since 2005, La Salle was able to sweep Ateneo during the elimination round.

During their first round meeting at the Mall of Asia Arena on July 7, 2013, the Green Archers, banking on the heroics of combo guard Almond Vosotros and center Arnold Van Opstal, defeated the Blue Eagles, 82–73, resulting to Ateneo's third straight loss to start the season. The second round meeting, which was held at the Araneta Coliseum on September 1, 2013, was tightly contested by Ateneo and La Salle, with the Green Archers winning over the Blue Eagles, 66–64, after sophomore forward Jeron Teng sank a floater with only two seconds left in the shot clock. Toward the end of the second round Ateneo-La Salle game, Perasol was involved in a scuffle with JJ Atayde, an alumnus of La Salle, after the former got irked with the latter's heckling. The incident caused the UAAP Board to penalize Perasol with a one-game suspension and Atayde with a season-wide ban from watching games.

Controversy further ensued after Perasol violated his one-game suspension by watching from inside the Ateneo dugout during the Blue Eagles' September 8, 2013 game against the UE Red Warriors, forcing UE team officials to file an inquiry before the UAAP Board. The UAAP Board acted on UE's request for an inquiry, ordering Perasol to serve his one-game suspension during Ateneo's September 18, 2013 game against the UST Growling Tigers. Ateneo, with Perasol serving his one-game suspension, was eventually defeated by UST, 74–82, causing the Blue Eagles to not only be dethroned as UAAP Men's Basketball Champions after five straight seasons but to also miss Final Four contention for the first time since 1998.

La Salle, after a disappointing 3–4 finish during the first round of elimination games, swept the second round and ended the elimination round at 10–4, forcing a three-way tie for the top spot alongside the NU Bulldogs and the FEU Tamaraws. Due to having the highest quotient, NU took the Number One spot with twice-to-beat advantage and faced UST in the Final Four, with the Growling Tigers defeating the Bulldogs in two games. On the other hand, La Salle and FEU faced each other twice, the first meeting being a rubber match game for the Number Two spot and the twice-to-beat advantage and the second being the formal Final Four game, with the Green Archers winning on both occasions and entering the Finals for the first time since UAAP Season 71. During the finals series, La Salle defeated UST in three games to win the UAAP Season 76 men's basketball championship title.

2016: Green Archers unleash "Mayhem"

Game	Winner	Loser	Series
Game 1	La Salle 67	Ateneo 65	La Salle 1–0
Game 2	La Salle 79	Ateneo 72	La Salle 2–0

Both Ateneo and La Salle's men's basketball teams were eliminated during the Final Four games in 2014 and 2015, marking the most recent time as of 2026 that neither schools qualified to the UAAP Finals. By 2016, La Salle was able to utilize center Ben Mbala, and tapped the services of former Letran Knights coach Aldin Ayo while Ateneo was on a rebuilding stage after the graduation of their top two scorers in Kiefer Ravena and Von Pessumal though they were able to get the services of former Gilas Pilipinas coach Tab Baldwin. Under coach Ayo, La Salle adopted a defense-oriented system with emphasis on fast breaks and the use of full-court press which Ayo called "Mayhem". The Green Archers finished the elimination round as the top seed with a 13–1 record with Ateneo coming in second with a 10–4 win–loss record. The only loss of the Green Archers came at the hands of their archivals, the Ateneo Blue Eagles during the second to the last game of the elimination round. Coming into Final Four both teams have a twice-to-beat advantage with La Salle defeating Adamson in just one game while Ateneo had to utilize their twice-to-beat incentives against FEU. After eight years, Ateneo and La Salle faced off in the Finals, with La Salle emerging as the champion of Season 79 after sweeping Ateneo in the Finals.

2017–2019: Blue Eagles win three consecutive championships

Game	Winner	Loser	Series
Game 1	Ateneo 76	La Salle 70	Ateneo 1–0
Game 2	La Salle 92	Ateneo 83	Tied 1–1
Game 3	Ateneo 88	La Salle 86	Ateneo 2–1

The following year, in Season 80, the Ateneo Blue Eagles won their first 13 games of the elimination round. Their bid for a sweep was denied by the De La Salle Green Archers. In the Final Four matches, La Salle went on to defeat the Adamson Soaring Falcons, while the Blue Eagles lost the first game to the FEU Tamaraws, their second loss of the season. Ateneo prevailed over FEU in the decider and faced La Salle in the championship series. The Blue Eagles took Game One, 76–70, whereas the Green Archers rallied from 21 points down to take Game 2, 92–83. In Game 3, the Blue Eagles led by as much as 10 points in order to defeat La Salle, 88–86, and retake the men's basketball championship.

Season 80 would eventually become the first of three consecutive championships (all against La Salle, UP and UST, respectively) for Ateneo up to Season 82 (the first championship round between the #1 and #4-seeded men's basketball teams, and the first 16–0 season sweep, in UAAP history), anchored by Thirdy Ravena, the first collegiate player in UAAP history to win three consecutive Finals Most Valuable Player (MVP) awards. As of 2026, Ateneo remains the most recent men's basketball team to win consecutive UAAP championships.

2022: Back-to-back Battle of Katipunan finals

The COVID-19 pandemic halted all the remaining league tournaments in 2020, and the remainder of the season, including the entire following season, was cancelled on April 7 of that year. During the resumption of the UAAP Season 84 in 2022, however, both Ateneo and La Salle lost to the UP Fighting Maroons in the men's basketball post-season rounds. UP swept La Salle in the eliminations before ousting them in their final game of their Final Four series. In addition, UP ended Ateneo's UAAP record of 39-game winning streak and their bid for a second consecutive season of elimination round sweep and stepladder finals berth, before dethroning them in their do-or-die match in the championship round and denying their bid for an unprecedented second streak of four consecutive UAAP championships. As a result, this marked the first time in UAAP history that an eventual champion team has defeated both Ateneo and La Salle, as well as win multiple overtime games in the championship series, in the post-season rounds in men's basketball in any single season.

In UAAP Season 85, La Salle ended their seven-game losing streak to Ateneo in UAAP men's basketball dating from the Season 80 championship series in the first round of the eliminations before Ateneo won their head-to-head matchup in the second round of the eliminations. While both Ateneo and La Salle split their respective elimination records with the semifinal-bound UP Fighting Maroons and NU Bulldogs, Ateneo defeated UP in the second round of the eliminations to clinch the top seed while gain a twice-to-beat semifinal advantage for the sixth consecutive season—the longest overall streak in the Final Four era of UAAP men's basketball—after sweeping the Adamson Soaring Falcons due to quotient system in the eliminations. Meanwhile, La Salle was eliminated from semifinal contention after losing to Adamson in their playoff for the fourth seed. UP and Ateneo eventually ousted NU and Adamson, respectively, en route to their second consecutive (and third overall) joint UAAP men's basketball championship series appearance. Ateneo prevailed in three games to deny the UP Fighting Maroons their bid for an unprecedented double UAAP championship streak in a single calendar year, anchored by Ange Kouame, the first naturalized and overall player in UAAP men's basketball history to win Rookie of the Year, and Season and Finals Most Valuable Player (MVP) awards.

2023–2025: La Salle–UP finals trilogy

In December 2022, La Salle opted not to renew the contract of Derrick Pumaren after having been the head coach of the Green Archers for UAAP Seasons 84 and 85. In January 2023, Topex Robinson was named as the new head coach, taking over from Pumaren for UAAP Season 86. Ateneo won over La Salle in their first round encounter of the season. La Salle would then beat Ateneo to sweep the second round of the eliminations on an eight-game win streak. The Blue Eagles were eventually dethroned by the UP Fighting Maroons in the first game of their Final Four encounter, ending Ateneo's streak of UAAP Finals and podium appearances dating back from Baldwin's debut as head coach in the UAAP in 2016. Meanwhile, La Salle would make their first UAAP Finals appearance since UAAP Season 80 in 2017 after beating the NU Bulldogs, extending the all-time record for the most overall number of Finals appearances by any men's basketball team in UAAP Final Four history.

The Green Archers went on to win their 10th UAAP championship against the Fighting Maroons in three games during their first ever head-to-head UAAP Finals (and second overall playoffs stage) matchup. The third game of the finals drew a record 25,192 fans in attendance at the Smart Araneta Coliseum. Kevin Quiambao became the first local UAAP Season MVP since Ateneo's Kiefer Ravena, and the first Green Archer to win the award since Ben Mbala. He would also be crowned the Finals MVP, becoming the first local UAAP player in the post-COVID pandemic era to have won Rookie of the Year, Season and Finals MVP awards in a single career. Robinson joined a group of La Salle mentors who reached the UAAP Finals in their first year as head coach and won the championship. This includes coaches Franz Pumaren, Juno Sauler, and Aldin Ayo.

In Season 87, the De La Salle Green Archers emerged as the top seed after sweeping both Ateneo Blue Eagles and second-seeded UP Fighting Maroons in the elimination rounds, while Ateneo dropped to the eighth seed and did not qualify to the men's basketball playoffs for the first time in the Coach Tab Baldwin era and since 2013. La Salle and UP defeated the Adamson Soaring Falcons and UST Growling Tigers, respectively, for their second consecutive and overall UAAP Finals matchup. However, La Salle was dethroned after losing to UP in three games in the championship series in the same season. The winner-take-all game between the Fighting Maroons and the Green Archers drew a record 25,248 fans inside the Smart Araneta Coliseum, resetting their joint previous record the preceding year to become the second largest in-venue attendance in any event in UAAP history after NU defeated UP and UST during the 2015 Cheerdance Competition.

In Season 88, Ateneo and La Salle split their elimination round matchups, with Ateneo winning the first round and La Salle winning the second round. The Green Archers' win in the second round eliminated the Blue Eagles from Final Four contention. This marked the first time since UAAP Seasons 60 and 61 that the Blue Eagles missed the Final Four in two consecutive seasons. The UP Fighting Maroons and the De La Salle Green Archers emerged as the second and fourth seed teams respectively, heading into the Final Four. UP eliminated the third-seeded UST Growling Tigers in one game, while La Salle swept the top-seeded NU Bulldogs to return to the finals to face the Fighting Maroons for the third consecutive year. The De La Salle Green Archers dethroned the UP Fighting Maroons during the best-of-three series, having lost Game 2 but won Games 1 and 3 to claim their 11th UAAP championship. The Green Archers became the second fourth seed team to win the title after the NU Bulldogs from UAAP Season 77 in 2014. This also marked the fifth consecutive season where the UAAP Finals series reached a do-or-die third game – the longest such streak so far in the league's Final Four history.

=== Juniors' basketball rivalry ===
The two universities are also represented in the high school level, with the Ateneo de Manila High School (AHS) and La Salle's junior teams. La Salle's juniors' team was represented first by DLSC High School from 1924 to 1967, followed by La Salle Green Hills (LSGH) from 1968 up to 1981, and then De La Salle Santiago Zobel School (DLSZ) from 1986 through the present. A similar rivalry, although on a much lesser scale, currently exists. When La Salle Green Hills used to be the juniors' team of the Green Archers in the NCAA, the rivalry between Ateneo and La Salle in the high school level was much stronger, considering that both the Ateneo de Manila High School and La Salle Green Hills used to be all-male schools, igniting a huge rumble in 1978. Ateneo de Manila High School became coed in 2016, while La Salle Green Hills became coed in its senior high school program first in 2020, and then in all levels by 2021. However, this rivalry has since faded with AHS transferring to the UAAP in 1978 and LSGH staying in the NCAA. Still, the remnants of this rivalry live on in the UAAP with LSGH's sister school DLSZ, the juniors representative of De La Salle University in the UAAP, taking its place.

In juniors' basketball, Ateneo has 11 NCAA titles and 19 UAAP titles, for a total of 30, whereas La Salle has six NCAA titles and two UAAP titles, for eight in total. The De La Salle Greenies defeated the Ateneo Blue Eaglets in the 1939 NCAA Juniors Championship. Ateneo de Manila High School and De La Salle Santiago Zobel School met twice in the UAAP juniors' basketball finals; in 2007 in which the Junior Archers swept the series in two games dethroning the Eaglets in the process, and in 2009 in which the Blue Eaglets won the best-of-three series, 2–1. In addition, the Junior Archers were not able to defend their 2005 championship due to their suspension along with their seniors' counterparts.

=== UAAP Final Four rankings ===
For comparison, these are the rankings of these two teams since the Final Four format was introduced in UAAP Season 56 (1993–94).

==== Seniors' division ====
A.Y.	Ateneo	La Salle
1993–1994	5th	3rd
1994–1995	6th	1st
1995–1996	7th	2nd
1996–1997	5th	1st
1997–1998	6th	3rd
1998–1999	6th	1st
1999–2000	3rd	1st
2000–2001	2nd	1st
2001–2002	2nd	1st
2002–2003	3rd	1st
2003–2004	1st	~~4th~~ ^{a}
2004–2005	3rd	~~2nd~~ ^{a}
2005–2006	3rd	~~2nd~~ ^{a}
2006–2007	1st	
2007–2008	3rd	2nd
2008–2009	1st	2nd
2009–2010	1st	6th
2010–2011	2nd	4th
2011–2012	1st	6th
2012–2013	1st	4th
2013–2014	5th	2nd
2014–2015	1st	3rd
2015–2016	3rd	5th
2016–2017	2nd	1st
2017–2018	1st	2nd
2018–2019	1st	5th
2019–2020	1st	5th
2021–2022	1st	3rd
2022–2023	1st	5th
2023–2024	4th	2nd
2024–2025	8th	1st
2025–2026	6th	4th

==== Juniors' division ====
A.Y.	Ateneo	La Salle
1993–1994	3rd	5th
1994–1995	2nd	5th
1995–1996	1st	7th
1996–1997	2nd	3rd
1997–1998	1st	5th
1998–1999	2nd	4th
1999–2000	1st	6th
2000–2001	1st	3rd
2001–2002	2nd	4th
2002–2003	2nd	5th
2003–2004	1st	4th
2004–2005	1st	3rd
2005–2006	1st	2nd
2006–2007	1st	
2007–2008	1st	2nd
2008–2009	1st	2nd
2009–2010	3rd	1st
2010–2011	1st	4th
2011–2012	4th	2nd
2012–2013	4th	5th
2013–2014	2nd	3rd
2014–2015	1st	4th
2015–2016	3rd	2nd
2016–2017	3rd	4th
2017–2018	1st	6th
2018–2019	2nd	6th
2019–2020	3rd	7th
2022–2023	5th	6th
2023–2024	7th	6th
2024–2025	7th	6th
2025–2026	3rd	4th

Finished as the champion
Finished as the 1st runner-up
Finished as the 2nd runner-up
Finished as the 3rd runner-up
Suspended

a.La Salle admitted to have unknowingly fielded two ineligible players for the previous years from 2003 to 2005. However, the admission was made months after learning about the ineligibility. The UAAP Board forfeited their 2004–05 championship title and had to return their trophy. As a result, FEU was awarded the men's basketball championship for the 2004–05 season. The Green Archers' team standings from 2003 to 2005 were revoked and La Salle was suspended in the 2006–07 season from all UAAP events. Four Ateneo wins and seven La Salle wins from the 2003 to 2005 seasons were forfeited, but this only affected the championships, moreover nullity of title does not imply a win column to the opposition.

=== National Seniors Open ===
The National Seniors Open was a tournament participated by top commercial (MICAA) and collegiate teams in the country. La Salle won the 1939 and 1949 Championships. Ateneo has not won a National Seniors Open championship.

=== National Open ===
The De La Salle Green Archers won the National Open in 1983.

=== Philippine University Games ===
Ateneo has won the basketball crown of the Philippine University Games three times in 2008, 2009, and 2011. La Salle has won it once in 1998.

=== Filoil EcoOil Preseason Cup ===
In the Filoil EcoOil Preseason Cup, the Ateneo Blue Eagles have won the title twice, while the De La Salle Green Archers have won the championship four times. The Blue Eagles won their first title in 2011 and their second in 2018. The Green Archers won the first two editions of the tournament in 2006 and 2007. They also won the championship in 2014 and 2016.

=== PBA D-League ===
Both the Ateneo Blue Eagles and the De La Salle Green Archers have participated in the PBA D-League Aspirants' Cup as Cignal–Ateneo and EcoOil–La Salle, respectively. Ateneo won the title in 2019, while La Salle won three straight championships in 2022, 2023, and 2024.

=== World University Basketball Series ===
Ateneo and La Salle have competed in the World University Basketball Series (WUBS) held in Tokyo, Japan. Ateneo was crowned the first champion of the World University Basketball Series after sweeping the tournament in 2022. In 2024, La Salle also swept the tournament and won the championship.

=== Pinoyliga Collegiate Cup ===
Both the Ateneo Blue Eagles and De La Salle Green Archers have participated in the Pinoyliga Collegiate Cup. The Blue Eagles won in 2023, while the Green Archers won in 2024.

=== AsiaBasket ===
Both Ateneo and La Salle have participated in the AsiaBasket tournaments. Ateneo first competed in the 2023 AsiaBasket Las Piñas Championship where they won the championship against the CSB Blazers, 60–57. De La Salle then made their debut in the 2025 AsiaBasket College Campus Tour, where the two teams would meet in the finals. The Green Archers won against the Blue Eagles, 89–77, to claim the championship.

=== University Top League ===
Ateneo and La Salle participated in the University Top League (UTL) tournaments in Japan. The Blue Eagles won the tournament via sweep in 2025. The following year, Ateneo withdrew from the tournament and was replaced by La Salle. The Green Archers would also sweep the tournament to win the title.

== Men's basketball tournament results ==
Men's basketball games between the two in the UAAP are the most anticipated match-ups in the season, with most games being sold out. Both teams are guaranteed to face each other at the elimination round (regular season) twice, while they can meet for a maximum of three times in the playoffs (up to three times in the semifinals, or twice in the semifinals plus a seeding playoff). The games were played consistently from 1986 until 2006 when La Salle was suspended after admitting that it fielded two ineligible players from the 2003 to 2005 seasons, which it claimed to do so unknowingly.

=== NCAA men's basketball results ===
Ateneo victories	La Salle victories

No.	Date	Location	Winner	Score	Tournament
1	1939		La Salle	27–23	(Note: First Ateneo-La Salle championship game results with La Salle winning their first NCAA title.)
2	1958*	Rizal Memorial Coliseum	Ateneo	105–103^{OT}	(Note: NCAA championship, Ateneo wins second consecutive title.)
3	August 13, 1966	Rizal Memorial Coliseum	Ateneo	72–69	
4	September 29, 1966	Rizal Memorial Coliseum	Ateneo	80–74	

No.	Date	Location	Winner	Score	Tournament
5	1968	Loyola Center	La Salle	49–48	(Note: NCAA second round.)
6	September 27, 1969	Loyola Center	Ateneo	93–88	(Note: NCAA second round.)
7	1974*		La Salle	90–80	(Note: La Salle wins NCAA championship.)
(*) = finals games; (^) = semifinals; (≠) = seeding playoffs

=== UAAP men's basketball results ===
Ateneo victories	La Salle victories

No.	Date	Location	Winner	Score	Note/s
1	July 26, 1986	PhilSports Arena	Ateneo	88–77	(Note: Ateneo won their first four meetings against La Salle in the UAAP.)
2	August 23, 1986	Loyola Center	Ateneo	92–81	
3	August 23, 1987	Rizal Memorial Coliseum	Ateneo	95–91	
4	September 26, 1987	Rizal Memorial Coliseum	Ateneo	98–89	
5	August 13, 1988	Rizal Memorial Coliseum	La Salle	78–76	(Note: First win of La Salle against Ateneo in the UAAP.)
6	October 2, 1988	Rizal Memorial Coliseum	Ateneo	73–72	(Note: Ateneo defeated La Salle in the second round, giving Ateneo a twice-to-beat advantage in the finals.)
7	October 7, 1988*	Rizal Memorial Coliseum	Ateneo	76–70	(Note: First Ateneo-La Salle Finals in the UAAP. Ateneo defeated La Salle to retain its title and won back-to-back championships.)
8	August 27, 1989	Araneta Coliseum	La Salle	77–69	(Note: La Salle had a 6–0 record prior to the game.)
9	September 17, 1989	Araneta Coliseum	Ateneo	67–61	(Note: La Salle had a 9–0 record prior to the game.)
10	August 12, 1990	Araneta Coliseum	La Salle	64–57	
11	September 16, 1990	Araneta Coliseum	La Salle	66–64	
12	August 10, 1991	Araneta Coliseum	La Salle	99–77	
13	September 7, 1991	Araneta Coliseum	La Salle	79–75	
14	July 25, 1992	Araneta Coliseum	La Salle	70–64	
15	September 5, 1992	Blue Eagle Gym	La Salle	94–89	
16	August 7, 1993	Araneta Coliseum	La Salle	81–71	
17	September 18, 1993	Araneta Coliseum	Ateneo	77–66	(Note: Ateneo ends its 7-game losing streak against La Salle. Blue Eagles' Richie Ticzon and Vince Hizon's last game.)
18	August 13, 1994	Cuneta Astrodome	La Salle	81–66	(Note: La Salle had a 4–0 record prior to the game.)
19	September 3, 1994	Cuneta Astrodome	Ateneo	73–72	(Note: Blue Eagle Red Camua scored 18 points with 4 three-point shots and the last 4 free throws to seal the win for Ateneo.)
20	August 5, 1995	Araneta Coliseum	La Salle	54–49	(Note: La Salle had a 5–0 record prior to the game.)
21	September 2, 1995	Araneta Coliseum	La Salle	66–58	
22	July 27, 1996	Araneta Coliseum	La Salle	77–69	(Note: La Salle had a 2–0 record prior to the game.)
23	September 14, 1996	Araneta Coliseum	Ateneo	80–55	(Note: Ateneo shot 50% from 3-point range (16 of 32) and led the entire game.)
24	July 26, 1997	Araneta Coliseum	La Salle	61–54	(Note: Ren-Ren Ritualo's first Ateneo-La Salle game.)
25	September 6, 1997	Araneta Coliseum	La Salle	68–66	
26	August 1, 1998	Araneta Coliseum	La Salle	64–50	(Note: La Salle had a 3–0 record prior to the game. This is also the first ADMU-DLSU game for Coach Franz Pumaren as head coach of La Salle.)
27	September 12, 1998	Araneta Coliseum	La Salle	87–75	
28	July 31, 1999	Cuneta Astrodome	Ateneo	60–57	(Note: Coach Joe Lipa's 1st Ateneo-La Salle game as head coach for Ateneo. This is also BJ Manalo's first game against Ateneo.)
29	August 28, 1999	PhilSports Arena	La Salle	70–59	(Note: Don Allado's last Ateneo-La Salle game.)
30	July 15, 2000	Araneta Coliseum	La Salle	94–70	(Note: Opening day game. Mike Cortez and Larry Fonacier's first Ateneo-La Salle game.)
31	September 16, 2000	Araneta Coliseum	Ateneo	66–63	
32	July 15, 2001	Araneta Coliseum	La Salle	91–76	(Note: Opening day game. LA Tenorio, Joseph Yeo, Pocholo Villanueva and Mac Cardona's first Ateneo-La Salle game.)
33	September 16, 2001	Araneta Coliseum	La Salle	76–63	
34	September 27, 2001*	Araneta Coliseum	La Salle	74–68	(Note: UAAP Finals–Game 1.)
35	October 4, 2001*	Araneta Coliseum	Ateneo	76–72	(Note: UAAP Finals–Game 2.)
36	October 16, 2001*	Araneta Coliseum	La Salle	93–88	(Note: UAAP Finals–Game 3; La Salle wins their fourth consecutive title. LA Tenorio scored a career high 30 points in the Finals despite losing the game and the series. Ren-Ren Ritualo's last Ateneo-La Salle game. The game also served as the last Ateneo-La Salle game for Coach Joe Lipa as head coach for Ateneo.)
37	August 10, 2002	Araneta Coliseum	La Salle	70–60	(Note: La Salle had 6–0 record prior to the game. Coach Joel Banal's 1st Ateneo-La Salle game as head coach for Ateneo. This is also JC Intal, Doug Kramer, Macky Escalona, Junjun Cabatu and TY Tang's first ADMU-DLSU game.)
38	September 14, 2002	Araneta Coliseum	Ateneo	76–63	(Note: La Salle had a 13–0 record prior to the game. Ateneo eventually denied La Salle a 14–0 sweep of the eliminations, the first stepladder semifinals in the Final Four Era and an outright Finals berth.)
39	September 26, 2002*	Araneta Coliseum	Ateneo	72–70	(Note: UAAP Finals–Game 1. Larry Fonacier blocks Mac Cardona twice to secure the win.)
40	September 29, 2002*	Araneta Coliseum	La Salle	85–77	(Note: UAAP Finals–Game 2.)
41	October 5, 2002*	Araneta Coliseum	Ateneo	77–70	(Note: UAAP Finals–Game 3. Ateneo ends their 14-year championship drought. Enrico Villanueva, Gec Chia, Mike Cortez, Adonis Santa Maria and Willy Wilson's last Ateneo-La Salle game. The game is also controversial when Cortez shot only 2-of-13 from the field for 13 points, and was accused of match-fixing.)
42	~~August 9, 2003~~	Araneta Coliseum	Ateneo	82–68	(Note: First game with ineligible La Salle players. Chris Tiu and JVee Casio's first Ateneo-La Salle game. This is also Ryan Araña and Jerwin Gaco's first Ateneo-La Salle game since transferring to La Salle.)
43	~~September 13, 2003~~	Araneta Coliseum	Ateneo	98–89	
44	~~September 25, 2003~~	Araneta Coliseum	La Salle	76–72^{OT}	(Note: OT. UAAP semifinals, marred by a brawl that halted the game for several minutes when LA Tenorio sneaked in a punch against Jerwin Gaco which led to his suspension in the next game.)
45	~~September 30, 2003~~^	Araneta Coliseum	Ateneo	74–68	(Note: UAAP Semifinals. Ateneo lost in the Finals vs. FEU. Wesley Gonzales, Rich Alvarez and Carlo Sharma's last Ateneo-La Salle game. The game also served as the last Ateneo-La Salle game for Coach Joel Banal as head coach for Ateneo. Another commotion broke out again after the game between supporters.)
46	~~July 11, 2004~~	Araneta Coliseum	Ateneo	75–72	(Note: Opening day game. Japeth Aguilar and Rico Maierhofer's first ADMU-DLSU game. Larry Fonacier's last Ateneo-La Salle game for his UAAP career prior to their game against UP that eventually ended his final season as he sustained a season ending ACL injury. First ADMU-DLSU game of Coach Sandy Arespacochaga as head coach of Ateneo.)
47	~~August 22, 2004~~	Araneta Coliseum	La Salle	72–61	
48	~~September 14, 2004~~≠	Araneta Coliseum	#2 La Salle	82–69	(Note: 2nd-seed game.)
49	~~September 19, 2004~~^	Araneta Coliseum	La Salle	69–55	(Note: UAAP semifinals. La Salle was later stripped of their championship. Jerwin Gaco and Mac Cardona's last Ateneo-La Salle game. Last game of Coach Sandy Arespacochaga as head coach of Ateneo.)
50	~~July 10, 2005~~	Araneta Coliseum	La Salle	78–60	(Note: Opening day game. First Ateneo-La Salle game for Coach Norman Black as head coach for Ateneo. This is also the first ADMU-DLSU game for Jai Reyes and Rabeh Al-Hussaini.)
51	~~September 15, 2005~~	Araneta Coliseum	La Salle	72–55	
52	~~September 25, 2005~~^	Araneta Coliseum	La Salle	74–57	(Note: UAAP semifinals. La Salle lost in the Finals vs. FEU. LA Tenorio, Magnum Membrere, Japeth Aguilar, Joseph Yeo, Junjun Cabatu and Ryan Araña's last Ateneo-La Salle game. The game also served as the last Ateneo-La Salle for the two ineligible La Salle players after further investigation and eventually the two got expelled from the institution.)

No.	Date	Location	Winner	Score	Note/s
53	July 26, 2007	Araneta Coliseum	Ateneo	80–77^{OT}	(Note: OT. First game since the La Salle suspension. Nonoy Baclao's first Ateneo-La Salle game. This is also Ateneo's 1st official win against La Salle since 2004. The game is also controversial when La Salle protested that the two Atenean foreigners played at the same time. The UAAP Technical Committee junked La Salle's protest, since American Kirk Long did not actually enter the playing court, hence did not affect the outcome of the game.)
54	September 9, 2007	Araneta Coliseum	Ateneo	89–87	(Note: Chris Tiu converted a 3-point shot in the dying seconds of the game to seal the win for Ateneo.)
55	September 18, 2007≠	Araneta Coliseum	#2 La Salle	70–69	(Note: 2nd-seed game.)
56	September 27, 2007^	Araneta Coliseum	Ateneo	65–64	(Note: UAAP stepladder semifinals 2nd round.)
57	September 30, 2007^	Araneta Coliseum	La Salle	65–60	(Note: UAAP stepladder semifinals 2nd round. La Salle went on to win the championship vs. UE. Pocholo Villanueva and TY Tang's last game against Ateneo.)
58	July 6, 2008	Araneta Coliseum	Ateneo	79–73	(Note: LA Revilla, Ryan Buenafe and Nico Salva's first Ateneo-La Salle game.)
59	September 6, 2008	Araneta Coliseum	Ateneo	65–57	
60	September 21, 2008*	Araneta Coliseum	Ateneo	69–61	(Note: UAAP Finals–Game 1. Rabeh Al-Hussaini exploded for 31 points in the game. The game was highlighted by Nonoy Baclao's block on Rico Maierhofer.)
61	September 25, 2008*	Araneta Coliseum	Ateneo	62–51	(Note: UAAP Finals–Game 2; Ateneo wins second championship in 6 years. Chris Tiu, JVee Casio and Rico Maierhofer's last Ateneo-La Salle game. The game became controversial when Maierhofer was thrown out of the game after he allegedly flashed a dirty finger.)
62	August 9, 2009	Araneta Coliseum	Ateneo	76–72^{OT}	(Note: OT. Game played with a tribute to the late president Corazon Aquino. Some supporters from both sides wore yellow.)
63	August 16, 2009	Araneta Coliseum	Ateneo	81–65	(Note: Rabeh Al-Hussaini, Jai Reyes, and Nonoy Baclao's last game against La Salle. The game also served as the last Ateneo-La Salle game for Coach Franz Pumaren as head coach of La Salle. Ateneo went on to win their second consecutive championship.)
64	July 24, 2010	Araneta Coliseum	La Salle	66–63	(Note: Dindo Pumaren's first Ateneo-La Salle game as head coach of La Salle. First win of La Salle against Ateneo since 2007. Arthur dela Cruz's first Ateneo-La Salle game.)
65	August 22, 2010	Araneta Coliseum	Ateneo	74–57	(Note: Ateneo goes on to win their first three-peat in UAAP men's basketball. The Eaglets also took home the championship to make it a double three-peat, the first in the history of the two major collegiate leagues in the Philippines—UAAP and NCAA. Nico Elorde's last game against Ateneo and this is also Arthur dela Cruz's last Ateneo-La Salle Game.)
66	July 16, 2011	Araneta Coliseum	Ateneo	81–72	(Note: Kiefer Ravena exploded for 24 points on his first Ateneo-La Salle game in the Seniors division. This is also Greg Slaughter's first ADMU-DLSU game since transferring to Ateneo.)
67	August 28, 2011	Smart Araneta Coliseum	Ateneo	79–62	(Note: Ateneo had a 10–0 record prior to the game and later went on to win their fourth consecutive championship. This is also Dindo Pumaren's last Ateneo-La Salle game as head coach of La Salle.)
68	July 28, 2012	SM Mall of Asia Arena	Ateneo	71–61	(Note: This is the first Ateneo-La Salle game held at the SM Mall of Asia Arena. Gee Abanilla's first Ateneo-La Salle game as head coach of La Salle, Jeron Teng's first game against Ateneo and Nico Elorde's 1st game against La Salle since transferring to Ateneo.)
69	September 1, 2012	Smart Araneta Coliseum	Ateneo	77–67	
70	September 29, 2012^	Smart Araneta Coliseum	Ateneo	66–63	(Note: UAAP Semifinals. Ateneo went on to win their 5th straight UAAP championship vs. UST. Greg Slaughter, Nico Salva, Justin Chua and Coaches Norman Black and Gee Abanilla's last Ateneo-La Salle game.)
71	July 7, 2013	SM Mall of Asia Arena	La Salle	82–73	(Note: La Salle defeats Ateneo turning Ateneo's record to 0–3. Bo Perasol and Juno Sauler's first Ateneo-La Salle game as head coaches for Ateneo and La Salle respectively. Robert Bolick's first game against Ateneo.)
72	September 1, 2013	Smart Araneta Coliseum	La Salle	66–64	(Note: Ateneo loses bid for a sixth straight UAAP Men's Basketball Championship title and misses the Final Four for the first time in 14 years after losing its last elimination round game against the UST Growling Tigers. La Salle enters the Final Four and wins the UAAP Season 76 championship title after defeating UST in the Finals. LA Revilla, Juami Tiongson, Ryan Buenafe and Frank Golla's last Ateneo-La Salle game.)
73	July 20, 2014	Smart Araneta Coliseum	Ateneo	97–86	(Note: First meeting between the two teams in 2014. Ateneo defeats La Salle that sends them to a 0–2 start. Alfonzo Gotladera's first game against La Salle since transferring to Ateneo. The game also served as the first ADMU-DLSU game for Thirdy Ravena and Arvin Tolentino.)
74	August 17, 2014	Smart Araneta Coliseum	La Salle	88–86	(Note: Jeron Teng explodes for 32 points and 6 rebounds, including 17–20 from the free throw line. Ateneo lost to NU and La Salle was defeated by FEU in the Final Four. For the first time since 1993, both the Blue Eagles and the Green Archers failed to enter the UAAP Men's Basketball Finals. Robert Bolick, Norbert Torres, Almond Vosotros, Arnold Van Opstal, Chris Newsome and Nico Elorde's last ADMU-DLSU game.)
75	October 4, 2015	Smart Araneta Coliseum	La Salle	80–76	(Note: First meeting between the two teams in 2015. La Salle defeats Ateneo to tie with Ateneo for the 3rd. Andrei Caracut, Larry Muyang, Jollo Go, Renzo Navarro, Darryl Pascual, Jerie Pingoy, Isaac Go, Aaron Black, Hubert Cani, Matt and Mike Nieto's first Ateneo-La Salle game.)
76	November 8, 2015	Smart Araneta Coliseum	Ateneo	73–62	(Note: Ateneo avenged its first-round loss against La Salle. Ateneo won 5 consecutive games while La Salle lost 3 in a row. For the second straight year both Ateneo and La Salle failed to enter the UAAP Finals with La Salle failing to enter the Final Four for the first time since 2011. Kiefer Ravena, Von Pessumal and Alfonzo Gotladera's last Ateneo-La Salle game. Bo Perasol and Juno Sauler's last Ateneo-La Salle game as head coaches for Ateneo and La Salle respectively. The game also served as the last ADMU-DLSU game for Arvin Tolentino, Hubert Cani and Jerie Pingoy after transferring to other UAAP schools. This was also Darryl Pascual, Larry Muyang and Renzo Navarro's last Ateneo-La Salle game as they transferred to other NCAA schools.)
77	October 2, 2016	SM Mall of Asia Arena	La Salle	97–81	(Note: La Salle had a 6–0 record prior to the game. Coach Tab Baldwin and Aldin Ayo's first ADMU–DLSU game as head coaches for Ateneo and La Salle respectively. Ben Mbala, Aljun Melecio, Ricci Rivero, Justine Baltazar, Brent Paraiso, Mark Dyke, Jolo Mendoza, Shaun Ildefonso and Raffy Verano's first Ateneo-La Salle game.)
78	November 5, 2016	Smart Araneta Coliseum	Ateneo	83–71	(Note: La Salle had a 12–0 record prior to the game.)
79	December 3, 2016*	SM Mall of Asia Arena	La Salle	67–65	(Note: UAAP Finals Game 1. First Ateneo-La Salle finals since 2008.)
80	December 7, 2016*	Smart Araneta Coliseum	La Salle	79–72	(Note: UAAP Finals Game 2. Jeron Teng, Jason Perkins and Thomas Torres' last ADMU–DLSU game. This is also Shaun Ildefonso's last game as an Atenean after he decided to transfer to National University.)
81	October 8, 2017	Mall of Asia Arena	Ateneo	76–75	(Note: Ateneo had a 6–0 record prior to the game. Matt Nieto sinks 2 clutch freethrows to seal the win for Ateneo.)
82	November 12, 2017	Smart Araneta Coliseum	La Salle	79–76	(Note: Regular Season Finale for both teams. Ateneo had a 13–0 record prior to the game.)
83	November 25, 2017*	SM Mall of Asia Arena	Ateneo	76–70	(Note: UAAP Finals Game 1. First back-to-back Ateneo-La Salle finals since 2002. The game was marred by controversy after Ben Mbala accidentally elbowed Matt Nieto that resulted on a bloody cut above his left eye.)
84	November 29, 2017*	Smart Araneta Coliseum	La Salle	92–83	(Note: UAAP Finals Game 2. La Salle rallied back from a 21-point deficit. The game was marred by controversy when an Ateneo fan threw a bottle to the side of the La Salle bench.)
85	December 3, 2017*	Smart Araneta Coliseum	Ateneo	88–86	(Note: UAAP Finals Game 3. Ateneo ended their five-year championship drought. Vince Tolentino, Chibueze Ikeh, Kris Porter, Abu Tratter, Ben Mbala, and Coach Aldin Ayo's last Ateneo-La Salle game. This is also the last Ateneo-La Salle game for Prince and Ricci Rivero and Brent Paraiso, as the 3 of them were struck in a controversy a few months later. Prince eventually decided to end his UAAP career while the latter 2 decided to move to other UAAP schools, respectively.)
86	October 6, 2018	SM Mall of Asia Arena	Ateneo	71–55	(Note: Coach Louie Gonzales' first ADMU-DLSU game as head coach of La Salle. SJ Belangel, Angelo Kouame, William Navarro, Matthew Daves, Brandon Bates and Encho Serrano's first Ateneo-La Salle game. This is also Joaqui Manuel's first game against Ateneo. The game was highlighted when Ateneo forced La Salle to commit a season highs and lows of 28 turnovers (16 in the 1st half) and 3 assists. Both were season worst.)
87	November 11, 2018	Smart Araneta Coliseum	Ateneo	71–62	(Note: Ateneo clinches the #1 seed and the 1st twice-to-beat advantage after beating La Salle. This is Anton Asistio, Aaron Black, Kib Montalbo, Leonard Santillan, Jollo Go, Mark Dyke and Coach Louie Gonzales' last Ateneo-La Salle game. This is also Taane Samuel's 1st and only official Ateneo-La Salle game after suffering from a Jones fracture that kept him out of the season for 2 months and eventually he decided to go professional after signing a contract with the Manawatu Jets of the NBL a few months later effectively ending his UAAP eligibility. La Salle missed the last Final Four berth after losing to UP on their last game of the regular season and against FEU in the knockout match for the #4 seed. This is also the 1st time that La Salle would not make it in the post season since 2015 after 2 straight Finals appearances for both teams. Ateneo went on to win the championship vs UP.)
88	September 8, 2019	Smart Araneta Coliseum	Ateneo	81–69	(Note: Coach Gian Nazario's 1st Ateneo-La Salle game as head coach of La Salle. Jason Credo, Patrick Maagdenberg, Donn Lim, Joel Cagulangan, Francis Escandor, Jamie Malonzo, Keyshawn Meeker, James Laput, Ralph Cu, Tyrus Hill, Kurt Lojera and Jordan Bartlett's first ADMU-DLSU game.)
89	October 13, 2019	SM Mall of Asia Arena	Ateneo	77–69	(Note: Ateneo had a 9–0 record prior to the game. Coach Gian Nazario, Jordan Bartlett, Keyshawn Meeker, Jamie Malonzo, James Laput, Andrei Caracut, Aljun Melecio, Tyrus Hill, Encho Serrano, Brandon Bates, Thirdy Ravena, Isaac Go, Adrian Wong, William Navarro, Matt and Mike Nieto's last Ateneo-La Salle game. For the first time in Final Four history La Salle missed the post season for 2 consecutive seasons, Ateneo went on to win their 3rd straight championship against the UST Growling Tigers with a perfect 16–0 season win sweep record.)
90	April 2, 2022	SM Mall of Asia Arena	Ateneo	74–57	(Note: Both teams had 3–0 records prior to the game. La Salle's Evan Nelle, Mike Phillips and Deschon Winston's first Ateneo-La Salle game. Ateneo's Dave Ildefonso and La Salle's Mark Nonoy's first Ateneo-La Salle game following their transfers from NU and UST, respectively. This was the first Ateneo-La Salle game held since the COVID-19 pandemic in the Philippines. The game was not yet open to the public.)
91	April 12, 2022	SM Mall of Asia Arena	Ateneo	75–68	(Note: Ateneo had a 7–0 record prior to the game. La Salle's Justine Baltazar and Kurt Lojera, and Ateneo's Gian Mamuyac, Tyler Tio, Raffy Verano, SJ Belangel, and Jolo Mendoza's last Ateneo-La Salle game. Both teams eventually lost to the UP Fighting Maroons in the post-season, with La Salle losing in the semifinals, and Ateneo being denied another stepladder finals berth after the end of its league-record 39-game winning streak before being defeated in the Finals.)
92	October 9, 2022	Smart Araneta Coliseum	La Salle	83–78	(Note: Ateneo had a 2–0 record prior to the game. La Salle's Kevin Quiambao and Ateneo's Kai Ballungay and Gab Gomez's first Ateneo-La Salle game. It is also La Salle's first win against their rivals since the COVID-19 pandemic and since forcing a third game in the championship series in 2017, as they ended a 7-game losing streak against Ateneo.)
93	November 5, 2022	Smart Araneta Coliseum	Ateneo	68–54	(Note: Ateneo avenged its first-round loss against La Salle, as Ateneo dealt La Salle a fourth consecutive loss and its worst losing skid since 2011. Ateneo eventually registers its 8th consecutive Final Four appearance – the longest active post-season appearance streak in UAAP men's basketball – and 6th consecutive Finals appearance – the school's longest overall streak in the same tournament – after the Adamson Soaring Falcons eliminated the FEU Tamaraws from Final Four contention in this same round of the season to end their 8-season run in the semifinals from 2013 to 2022, barring the suspended tournament in 2020. This is also Ateneo's Angelo Kouame, BJ Andrade, Dave Ildefonso, and La Salle's Deschon Winston's last Ateneo-La Salle game. La Salle missed the last Final Four berth after losing to Adamson in the knockout match for the #4 seed. Ateneo went on to win the championship by dethroning UP in three games in the Finals.)
94	October 4, 2023	SM Mall of Asia Arena	Ateneo	77–72	(Note: Coach Topex Robinson's first Ateneo-La Salle game as the head coach of La Salle.)
95	November 18, 2023	Smart Araneta Coliseum	La Salle	72–69	(Note: La Salle sweeps the second round of the eliminations and ended Ateneo's three-game win streak. This is also Ateneo's Kai Ballungay and La Salle's Evan Nelle and Mark Nonoy's last Ateneo-La Salle game. La Salle had a seven-game win streak prior to the match. La Salle defeated the NU Bulldogs later on in the Final Four to return to the Finals for the first time since Season 80, while Ateneo was eventually dethroned by the UP Fighting Maroons in the Final Four. La Salle went on to win the championship against the Fighting Maroons in three games.)
96	September 15, 2024	SM Mall of Asia Arena	La Salle	74–61	(Note: First Ateneo-La Salle game of Ateneo's Jared Bahay and La Salle's Lian Ramiro, Vhoris Marasigan, Henry Agunanne, Andrei Dungo, and Alex Konov. This also marked the first time both Ateneo and La Salle wore dark jerseys, representing their school colors of blue and green, respectively.)
97	October 26, 2024	SM Mall of Asia Arena	La Salle	80–65	(Note: Kevin Quiambao sets a career-high 33 points. La Salle sweeps Ateneo in the elimination rounds for the first time since Season 76 in 2013 and earned their seventh consecutive win in Season 87. This is also Ateneo's Sean Quitevis, Chris Koon and Geo Chiu, and La Salle's Kevin Quiambao, CJ Austria, Raven Gonzales and Joshua David's last Ateneo-La Salle game. Ateneo misses the Final Four for the first time in 11 years, ending the season in last place of the standings with a 4–10 record. Meanwhile, La Salle was eventually dethroned by the UP Fighting Maroons after losing in three games in the Finals.)
98	October 5, 2025	SM Mall of Asia Arena	Ateneo	81–74	(Note: Ateneo had a 3–0 record prior to the game. Ateneo overcame a late La Salle resurgence in the 4th quarter after leading by as much as 33 points to seal the win for the Blue Eagles.)
99	November 26, 2025	Smart Araneta Coliseum	La Salle	78–72	(Note: La Salle avenged its first-round loss and knocks Ateneo out of Final Four contention. This marks the first time since UAAP Seasons 60 and 61 that Ateneo missed the UAAP Final Four in two consecutive seasons. La Salle went on to win their 11th UAAP title after dethroning the UP Fighting Maroons in three games. This marked the final Ateneo-La Salle game for Ateneo's Josh Lazaro, and La Salle's Mike Phillips. This was also Coach Tab Baldwin's final UAAP game for the Blue Eagles following the 2026 Ateneo drowning incident, which prompted his resignation and lifetime ban imposed by the UAAP.)
100	October 7, 2026	SM Mall of Asia Arena	La Salle	83–76	(Note: This was the 100th edition of the rivalry in the UAAP. With the win, La Salle tied up the overall head-to-head record 50–50. This was Coach Louie Alas' first Ateneo-La Salle game as interim head coach of Ateneo. This also was the first Ateneo-La Salle matchup for Ateneo's Kieffer Alas and La Salle's Joaquin Tovera.)
101	October 31, 2026	Smart Araneta Coliseum	La Salle	76–73^{OT}	(Note: Both teams had a 5–4 record prior to this game. La Salle extends its win streak to three games. First Ateneo-La Salle overtime game since August 9, 2009.)
Series: La Salle leads 51–50
(*) = finals games; (^) = semifinals; (≠) = seeding playoffs; (—) = forfeits

== Volleyball ==
=== Overall ===
In terms of total collegiate and high school volleyball titles won in the NCAA and UAAP, La Salle leads with 44 championships compared to Ateneo's 15 championships. In the seniors' division, La Salle leads Ateneo 20–9. La Salle was 4-peat NCAA men's champions from Seasons 53 to 56. The Green Spikers won their most recent UAAP titles in Seasons 64 and 66. The Lady Spikers were the first NCAA women's champions in volleyball when the tournament was introduced in NCAA Season 51 (1975–76) and have 12 UAAP titles. They are thrice 3-peat UAAP women's champions (2004–2006, 2011–2013, and 2016–2018), and hold the distinction of having the longest appearance in the UAAP Finals in the Final Four era, from Season 71 to Season 80 (2009–2018). La Salle is also the only women's volleyball team in UAAP history to both outright win the championship by winning all 14 elimination round games in a season (Season 67), and to have advanced outright to then-best-of-five championship series with thrice-to-beat incentives by winning all 14 elimination round games in a season for at least two seasons (Season 74 and Season 76). In Season 88, the De La Salle Lady Spikers became the third team after the Ateneo Lady Eagles in Season 77 and the NU Lady Bulldogs in Season 84 to sweep the tournament with a flawless 16–0 record.

Ateneo won the double (men's and women's) volleyball championship in NCAA Season 52 (1976–77), won its first UAAP volleyball championship in Season 76, and, by Season 77 and as of 2026, remains the most recent school to win the double UAAP volleyball championship in the seniors' division. The Lady Eagles were back-to-back UAAP women's champions in Seasons 76 and 77, and won their third title in Season 81. The Lady Eagles became the first volleyball team in UAAP history to finish an entire season (including the finals) without a single loss (16–0) in the Season 77 women's volleyball tournament. The Blue Eagles were 3-peat UAAP men's champions from Season 77 to Season 79 (2015–2017), the latter marking their perfect season in the men's volleyball tournament. Ateneo is the first member school in the UAAP to have scored 16–0 season win sweep records in both men's and women's divisions in collegiate volleyball.

The Ateneo Lady Eagles and the De La Salle Lady Spikers have met in the championships of the UAAP for six consecutive (and overall) times from Seasons 74 to 79 (2012–2017). The Lady Eagles won back-to-back titles over La Salle in 2014 and 2015, while the Lady Spikers prevailed back-to-back in 2012 and 2013, and 2016 and 2017. From UAAP Season 72 to UAAP Season 84, both Ateneo and La Salle have qualified in the postseason of women's volleyball (semifinals onwards), marking the longest joint Final Four appearance by any two UAAP volleyball teams in the league's history. Also, from UAAP Season 71 to UAAP Season 85, either or both Ateneo and La Salle have competed in the championship series in UAAP collegiate volleyball.

In the juniors' division, La Salle has 24 championships while Ateneo has six. Ateneo did not have a girls' team in the juniors' division prior to UAAP Season 86. The Blue Eaglet Spikers won championship titles in NCAA Seasons 43, 45, and 48, and were 3-peat champions from Seasons 50 to 52. The De La Salle Junior Spikers won seven championship titles under their membership stint in the NCAA which included a 4-peat championship streak along with the Green Spikers from Seasons 53 to 56. In the UAAP, they were 6-peat champions in the boys' division from Seasons 57 to 62, and have also won the title in Season 66. The Junior Lady Spikers were 5-peat champions from UAAP Seasons 57 to 61, and were 3-peat champions from Seasons 73 to 75. They also won additional titles in UAAP Seasons 65 and 81.

=== UAAP ===
UAAP Season 74 Women's Volleyball Finals

For the first time in UAAP history, Ateneo and La Salle met each other at the UAAP Season 74 women's volleyball finals. The De La Salle Lady Spikers became the first volleyball team ever to automatically enter the UAAP Finals with a thrice-to-beat advantage after sweeping the elimination round. On the other hand, the Ateneo Lady Eagles, consistently ranked second throughout much of the elimination round (with losses to La Salle, twice, and UST in the second round), defeated the third-seeded (and previous season's runner-up) UST Tigresses in the semifinals in four sets. This marks Ateneo's first entry to the UAAP volleyball finals since the school's 1978 admission into the UAAP.

Game One of the Finals was won by Ateneo in four sets, 23–25, 28–26, 25–23, 25–17, marking the first recorded Ateneo victory in any UAAP volleyball championship series while halting then-league record of 24 consecutive wins by La Salle (dating back from Season 73). La Salle went on to recover in Game Two in four sets, 23–25, 25–21, 26–24, 25–18, before sweeping Ateneo in Game Three, 25–16, 25–22, 25–13, to finish off the series in three games and win their second consecutive (and seventh overall) UAAP women's volleyball championship title. Abigail Maraño of La Salle was named as Most Valuable Player (MVP) of the Season, while then-graduating La Salle team captain Charleen Cruz is the first volleyball player in UAAP history to win multiple and consecutive Finals Most Valuable Player (MVP) awards.

UAAP Season 75 Women's Volleyball Finals

Ateneo and La Salle faced each other once again during the UAAP Season 75 women's volleyball finals after the De La Salle Lady Spikers defeated the NU Lady Bulldogs (in the latter's first ever Final Four placement in UAAP women's volleyball) and the Ateneo Lady Eagles defeated the Adamson Lady Falcons during the Final Four matches, both in straight sets, that were held at the Smart Araneta Coliseum on February 23, 2013. The UAAP Season 75 marked the first time ever that the league's Final Four and championship volleyball matches were played at the Smart Araneta Coliseum and the Mall of Asia Arena.

Game One of the Finals was played before a crowd of 17,342 at the Smart Araneta Coliseum on March 2, 2013. The Lady Spikers posed a comeback win over the Lady Eagles in five sets, 20–25, 17–25, 25–22, 25–22, 15–6. La Salle eventually swept Ateneo in Game Two, 25–23, 25–20, 25–16, in front of 18,779 people at the Mall of Asia Arena, to finish the series in two games and win their eighth UAAP women's volleyball championship title (and their second three-peat championship streak). La Salle team captain Abigail Maraño and teammate Victonara Galang became the first pair of volleyball players in UAAP history to be named co-Most Valuable Players (MVPs) of the Season, while then-graduating La Salle player Michele Gumabao was named the Most Valuable Player (MVP) of the Finals.

UAAP Season 76 Women's Volleyball Finals

For the third time, Ateneo and La Salle faced each other during UAAP Season 76 women's volleyball finals. The De La Salle Lady Spikers became the first volleyball team ever to enter the UAAP Finals with a thrice-to-beat advantage after sweeping the elimination round for a second overall season. On the other hand, the Ateneo Lady Eagles, under new head coach Anusorn "Tai" Bundit, were able to reach their third consecutive finals after winning three consecutive knockout matches against fourth-seeded Adamson Lady Falcons and then second-seeded, twice-to-beat NU Lady Bulldogs under the stepladder format.

Game One of the Finals, which was held on March 5, 2014, was won by Ateneo in four sets, 17–25, 25–23, 25–13, 25–20, marking their first win against La Salle in the entire season (and their only second win against La Salle in their entire joint UAAP women's volleyball finals appearances) while ending a still-standing league record of 30 consecutive wins by La Salle in UAAP women's volleyball history (dating back from the second game of the eliminations in Season 75). Three days later, on March 8, 2014, La Salle bounced back in Game Two and defeated Ateneo in four sets, 25–14, 25–20, 19–25, 26–24. The first two games of the Finals were held at the Smart Araneta Coliseum.

The venue of the remaining games of the Finals shifted to the Mall of Asia Arena. In Game Three, which was held on March 12, 2014, Ateneo defeated La Salle in five sets in front of the 18,095-strong crowd, 25–21, 25–23, 18–25, 16–25, 17–15, to force a winner-take-all title match on March 15, 2014. As a result, the UAAP Season 76 women's volleyball finals series became the league's longest volleyball championship series, and is, to date, the only one to last up to four games (in a best-of-five finals series format with a 1–0 advantage for any team). In Game Four, the Ateneo Lady Eagles swept the De La Salle Lady Spikers, 25–23, 26–24, 25–21, to deny La Salle's second overall four-peat championship bid and become the lowest-seeded volleyball team to ever win a UAAP volleyball championship title (Ateneo's maiden title) at the Mall of Asia Arena after a 21,314-strong audience.

Ateneo's team captain Alyssa Valdez became the first volleyball player in UAAP history to win both awards of the Most Valuable Player (MVP) of the Season and of the Finals, and the first UAAP athlete to win at least four awards in a single season (including awards for the Season's Best Scorer and Best Server categories).

UAAP Season 77 Women's Volleyball Finals

For the fourth time, Ateneo and La Salle faced each other during UAAP Season 77 women's volleyball finals. For the first time in UAAP history, the Ateneo Lady Eagles defeated the De La Salle Lady Spikers twice during the elimination rounds, and entered the finals with the thrice-to-beat advantage after amassing a 14–0 eliminations sweeps record. On the other hand, the second-seeded De La Salle Lady Spikers suffered their first defeat from a non-Ateneo team in the tournament (since UST Tigresses' shocking five-set season-opening win against DLSU in Season 75) during Game One against the third-seeded NU Lady Bulldogs in the semifinals (in straight sets), but recovered in Game Two in four sets at the expense of then La Salle's team captain Victonara Galang's post-season injury (which sidelined her from playing for Season 77 Finals).

Game One of the Finals, which was held on March 11, 2015 at the Smart Araneta Coliseum in front of 18,363 fans, was won by Ateneo in straight sets, 25–18, 25–19, 25–19. Three days later, on March 14, 2015, watched by 20,705 fans at the Mall of Asia Arena, Ateneo swept La Salle again in straight sets, 25–22, 25–17, 25–23, becoming the league's first ever overall volleyball varsity team to achieve a 16–0 perfect season (eliminations round up to the championship series) record and defeated La Salle for the second consecutive season to win the UAAP Season 77 volleyball championship title. Ateneo team captain Alyssa Valdez was named back-to-back Most Valuable Player (MVP) of the Season, while Amy Ahomiro won the award as the Most Valuable Player (MVP) of the Finals.

UAAP Season 78 Women's Volleyball Finals

For the fifth time, Ateneo and La Salle faced each other during UAAP Season 78 women's volleyball finals. During the first round of the eliminations, the eventually second-seeded DLSU Lady Spikers swept the season's top-seeded ADMU Lady Eagles in three straight sets (with La Salle dealing Ateneo's first single game loss after still-standing league record of 24 consecutive wins and since winning their maiden UAAP women's volleyball title in Season 76) to deny them a sweep of the elimination round and revert the tournament to a Regular Final Four format for the first time since Season 75. In the second round, however, Ateneo recovered in a five-set comeback win to seal their top-seed position.

After the eliminations, the Ateneo Lady Eagles swept the UP Lady Maroons during their comeback Final Four appearance after 13 years in three straight sets in the semifinals in a return trip to the finals for fifth consecutive UAAP Finals appearance, while the De La Salle Lady Spikers recovered from a shocking five-set loss in Game 1 of their Final Four match-up against the third-seeded FEU Lady Tamaraws to sweep their opponents in do-or-die Game 2 and book their eighth consecutive UAAP Finals appearance.

The UAAP Season 78 women's volleyball finals became the first championship series since the DLSU–FEU match-up in Season 71 to last up to three games under such tournament division (in a best-of-three finals series format). Game One of the Finals, which was held on April 23, 2016 and watched by 19,921 fans at the Smart Araneta Coliseum, was won by La Salle in straight sets, 25–22, 25–22, 25–21. Four days later, on April 27, 2016, Ateneo posed a come-from-behind win against La Salle in Game Two in five sets, 18–25, 26–28, 25–17, 25–16, 15–11, in front of the 20,541-strong crowd at the Mall of Asia Arena to force a winner-take-all match on April 30, 2016. La Salle, however, recovered in four sets, 19–25, 25–21, 25–16, 25–16 in Game Three to deny Ateneo's three-peat championship bid and win their ninth overall UAAP women's volleyball championship title (and first since Season 75) in front of a record 22,858-strong crowd at the Smart Araneta Coliseum - the largest in-venue attendance for any non-basketball or cheerdance event in UAAP history. In all of Philippine volleyball, it was only surpassed by game 2 of the 2023 Premier Volleyball League Second All-Filipino Conference championship between the Creamline Cool Smashers and Choco Mucho Flying Titans.

Graduating Ateneo Lady Eagles' team captain Alyssa Valdez earned her third straight award for Most Valuable Player (MVP) of the Season, becoming the first UAAP women's volleyball athlete to earn three consecutive MVP awards since Monica Aleta from FEU from Seasons 63 to 65, and the first volleyball athlete in UAAP history to win at least four overall Most Valuable Player (MVP) awards. Meanwhile, Kim Kianna Dy of the De La Salle Lady Spikers was hailed as the Most Valuable Player (MVP) of the Finals.

UAAP Season 79 Women's Volleyball Finals

For the sixth time, Ateneo and La Salle faced each other during UAAP Season 79 women's volleyball finals. During the first round of eliminations, the defending champions (and eventually second-seeded) De La Salle Lady Spikers suffered a shock straight sets loss to the UP Lady Maroons but recovered in the second round of eliminations against the same team with another straight sets victory. Meanwhile, the Ateneo Lady Eagles suffered losses only to the NU Lady Bulldogs twice in the elimination rounds but swept the De La Salle Lady Spikers in the elimination rounds to secure the top seed for this season. This marks the most recent season that Ateneo has won at least a single game against La Salle in UAAP women's volleyball tournament as of 2026.

In the semifinal round, the De La Salle Lady Spikers won over the third-seeded UST Tigresses during the latter's comeback Final Four appearance after 5 years in four sets to book their ninth consecutive UAAP Finals appearance, while the Ateneo Lady Eagles also won against the fourth-seeded FEU Lady Tamaraws in four sets to book their sixth consecutive UAAP Finals appearance. This marked the longest streak of joint UAAP Finals appearances by any two women's volleyball teams in the league's history.

Game One of the Finals was held at the Smart Araneta Coliseum on May 2, 2017 in front of 13,468 fans. The De La Salle Lady Spikers recorded their first victory against Ateneo Lady Eagles during this game for this season in four sets, 21–25, 29–27, 25–22 and 25–20. Game Two of the Finals was held again at the Smart Araneta Coliseum on May 6, 2017 in front of 20,860 fans. The De La Salle Lady Spikers won against the Ateneo Lady Eagles in five sets, 19–25, 25–14, 18–25, 25–18 and 15–10, to sweep the series in two games and earn their second consecutive (and 10th overall) UAAP women's volleyball title. La Salle players Mary Joy Baron and Desiree Cheng were named as Most Valuable Player (MVP) of the Season and of the Finals, respectively.

UAAP Seasons 80 and 81 Women's Volleyball

Season 79 would eventually be the last of the string of six consecutive Ateneo–La Salle match-ups in the UAAP women's volleyball finals dating back from Season 74. The Lady Eagles, after losing twice to the De La Salle Lady Spikers, FEU Lady Tamaraws and NU Lady Bulldogs in the first round, and to the UP Lady Maroons in the second round of the eliminations, were booted out from finals contention in Season 80 as the third-seeded team by that season's hosting school and second-seeded team FEU Lady Tamaraws in four sets. This marked the first time that Ateneo lost in the Final Four with a twice-to-beat disadvantage since their Final Four showdown against La Salle in Season 73.

Meanwhile, the top-seeded De La Salle Lady Spikers, after losing only to both the Adamson Lady Falcons and NU Lady Bulldogs in the first round of the eliminations, swept the fourth-seeded NU Lady Bulldogs in their Final Four match-up to pose their tenth consecutive UAAP Finals appearance in 2018. La Salle would eventually sweep FEU in the finals (in the first consecutive UAAP women's volleyball finals sweep records since collegiate volleyball's shift to second semester in the UAAP annual calendar in Season 69) to win their 11th UAAP women's volleyball title (and their third three-peat championship streak, the most in UAAP history) in 2018. Then-graduating La Salle player Dawn Macandili became the first volleyball libero in UAAP history to win the award for Most Valuable Player (MVP) of the Finals. As of 2026, La Salle remains the most recent women's volleyball team to win consecutive UAAP championships.

In Season 81, however, La Salle lost back-to-back games against the UP Lady Maroons and UST Golden Tigresses in the first round of the eliminations (marking their first back-to-back elimination round losses since the forfeiture of their wins in Season 70 due to eligibility issues), and lost back-to-back games against the FEU Lady Tamaraws in the last game of the eliminations, and the second-seed playoff (and twice-to-beat semifinal incentive) to UST (marking their first back-to-back losses between the elimination rounds and the post-season playoffs since Season 77). La Salle was eventually dethroned in their Final Four match-up against UST the same year, ending their third overall bid for four straight championships and still-standing league record of decade-long appearance in the UAAP Finals. This season marked the first time that no green-colored school has competed in the UAAP women's volleyball finals in the 21st century, and the first time that the defending UAAP women's volleyball champions have been dethroned in the season outside the championship series since FEU's Final Four ousting of UST (and eventual overall title win) in Season 70.

Meanwhile, the top-seeded Ateneo Lady Eagles, after losing only to La Salle twice in the elimination rounds, won in their third consecutive year of Final Four match-up against fourth-seeded FEU (after erasing Ateneo's twice-to-beat incentive in the opening match of their semifinal showdown) to pose their return to the finals (their seventh overall) after missing the cut in the previous year. This marked the first time since Season 69 that both of the previous season's finalists were eliminated before the UAAP women's volleyball championship round. The Lady Eagles went on to win the finals against UST, 2–1, in the first ever Ateneo–UST UAAP volleyball finals showdown, to claim their third (overall) women's volleyball title (and their first since Season 77). This marked the first time that the eventual UAAP women's volleyball champions overcame a finals series game deficit to win the title since Season 76. Then-graduating team captains Sisi Rondina of UST and Bea de Leon of Ateneo were hailed the Most Valuable Player (MVP) awards of the Season and Finals, respectively.

UAAP Seasons 82 and 84 Women's Volleyball

Ateneo's UAAP women's volleyball title defense campaign, however, was postponed due to the COVID-19 pandemic that halted all remaining league tournaments in 2020. The first and only Ateneo–La Salle women's volleyball game which La Salle won in four sets, became the UAAP's last match to be held (and the last major sporting event broadcast live in the Philippines) in the same year. The remainder of Season 82 was officially cancelled on April 7, 2020.

La Salle would later on repeat the same victory against Ateneo in the first round of the eliminations in the post-pandemic resumption of the UAAP tournaments in 2022 to extend their head-to-head winning streak since their finals sweep in Season 79. In the second game of the tournament, La Salle would win in five sets to sweep Ateneo in the elimination round. During the eliminations, Ateneo and La Salle were swept by the NU Lady Bulldogs and split their win-loss records with the UST Golden Tigresses and Adamson Lady Falcons. La Salle would later on grab the second seed and twice-to-beat advantage in the stepladder playoffs after National University advanced outright to the UAAP Finals, while fourth-seeded Ateneo ousted Adamson and UST in consecutive games to become the lowest-seeded Final Four team in UAAP women's volleyball history to complete a podium finish after setting up the only second Ateneo–La Salle semifinals series in the same division. La Salle dethroned Ateneo via sweep in the stepladder semifinals to pose their return to the UAAP Finals, marking the first time in the Final Four era of UAAP women's volleyball that both preceding season's finalists were ousted from the championship round for consecutive seasons.

La Salle eventually lost to the NU Lady Bulldogs via series sweep as the Lady Bulldogs went on to win their first championship in 65 years. National University became the first non-Ateneo and non-La Salle team to complete a sweep in UAAP women's volleyball, following the season sweep records by La Salle in 2004 (Season 67, 14–0 all throughout the eliminations) and Ateneo in 2015 (Season 77, 16–0 from the eliminations to stepladder finals series). Consequently, this season marked the first time in UAAP women's volleyball history that both Ateneo and La Salle lost in all the races of Rookie of the Year, Season and Finals Most Valuable Player (MVP) awards, as NU clinched these accolades courtesy of Mhicaela Belen, the league's first collegiate volleyball player ever to sweep the Rookie of the Year, Most Valuable Player (MVP) and tournament championship awards in the same year, and team captain Princess Anne Robles.

UAAP Seasons 85 and 86 Women's Volleyball

In Season 85, La Salle swept all first nine games of the season to secure the top seed, including an eventual sweep of Ateneo and the defending champions NU Lady Bulldogs in the elimination rounds via quadruple 3-set wins. However, the UST Golden Tigresses defeated both Ateneo and La Salle in the second round of the eliminations to both revert the UAAP women's volleyball post-season format back to a regular Final Four setting for the first time in UAAP's post-COVID-19 pandemic era and since Season 81, and end Ateneo's Final Four appearance streak in UAAP women's volleyball dating back from Season 72 – the school's longest in the tournament's history. This also officially ended the joint Ateneo-La Salle presence in the UAAP women's volleyball post-season rounds from the said season to Season 84 – the longest by multiple schools simultaneously in the tournament's history.

La Salle went on to sweep the NU Lady Bulldogs in the Finals and claim their 12th UAAP women's volleyball title in their first joint back-to-back UAAP Finals appearance since the sixth consecutive (and most recent) Ateneo-La Salle matchup in the championship series in Season 79, spearheaded by Angel Anne Canino, who became the school's first ever collegiate (and, as of 2026, the league's only second consecutive women's and most recent overall) volleyball player to win Rookie of the Year and Season Most Valuable Player (MVP) awards, and tournament championship in the same year.

La Salle's ongoing head-to-head winning streak against Ateneo continued throughout the elimination rounds in Season 86, with Ateneo missing out consecutive seasons for Final Four contention for the first time since Season 69. La Salle, however, lost to the eventual finalists UST Golden Tigresses and NU Lady Bulldogs in the elimination rounds, with UST eventually dethroning La Salle during their Final Four matchup and becoming the first team to oust La Salle from UAAP Finals contention at any given point of the season (elimination rounds or playoffs) multiple times since the debut of Ramil de Jesus as the latter team's (currently ongoing) head coach in Season 60 in 1997. As a result, Season 86 marks the first time since Season 70 in 2008 that neither Ateneo nor La Salle have qualified to the women's volleyball championship series in the UAAP.

== Women's volleyball tournament results ==
The rivalry started to gain recognition in UAAP Season 74 when both teams met in the finals for the first time. Head-to-head championships between the teams have La Salle leading four championships to two. The Ateneo Lady Eagles and the De La Salle Lady Spikers have fought in the UAAP Finals for six consecutive times from Seasons 74 to 79 (2012–2017), where the Lady Eagles won in 2014 and 2015 while the Lady Spikers won in 2012, 2013, 2016, and 2017.

=== UAAP women's volleyball results ===
Ateneo victories	La Salle victories

No.	Date	Location	Winner	Score	Note/s
1	1997/1998	UP Human Kinetics Gym	La Salle	3–0	
2	1997/1998	UP Human Kinetics Gym	La Salle	3–0	(Note: DLSU Lady Spikers first UAAP Final Four appearance since their admission in 1986.)
3	1998/1999	UP Human Kinetics Gym	La Salle	3–1	
4	1998/1999	Blue Eagle Gym	La Salle	3–2	(Note: DLSU Lady Spikers first UAAP women's volleyball finals appearance since their admission in 1986.)
5	1999/2000	Blue Eagle Gym	La Salle	3–2	
6	1999/2000	Blue Eagle Gym	La Salle	3–0	(Note: DLSU Lady Spikers went on to bag their first UAAP women's volleyball championship title.)
7	2000/2001	UP Human Kinetics Gym	La Salle	3–2	
8	2000/2001	UP Human Kinetics Gym	La Salle	3–2	
9	2001/2002	UP Human Kinetics Gym	La Salle	3–2	
10	2001/2002	UP Human Kinetics Gym	La Salle	3–1	
11	2002/2003	UP Human Kinetics Gym	La Salle	3–2	
12	2002/2003	Blue Eagle Gym	La Salle	3–2	
13	2003/2004	UP Human Kinetics Gym	La Salle	3–2	
14	2003/2004	UP Human Kinetics Gym	La Salle	3–0	(Note: DLSU Lady Spikers went on to win their second UAAP women's volleyball championship title.)
15	2004/2005	UP Human Kinetics Gym	La Salle	3–2	
16	2004/2005	Blue Eagle Gym	La Salle	3–2	(Note: DLSU Lady Spikers went on to face UST in September 11, 2004 at the UP College of Human Kinetics Gym to nab its 14th straight victory and claim the women's volleyball crown outright. It was also their second straight and third UAAP women's volleyball championship title. This is the only championship-clinching perfect 14-0 season win sweep record in UAAP volleyball history prior to the application of the stepladder format for all succeeding elimination round-sweeping athletic teams in the league.)
17	2005/2006	Cuneta Astrodome	La Salle	3–1	
18	2005/2006	Cuneta Astrodome	La Salle	3–1	(Note: DLSU Lady Spikers went on to bag their third straight and fourth UAAP women's volleyball championship title.)
19	2008	Filoil Flying V Centre	Ateneo	3–1	(Note: Ateneo Lady Eagles and DLSU Lady Spikers first meeting since La Salle's suspension.)
20	~~2008~~	Filoil Flying V Centre	Ateneo	3–1	(Note: All games of La Salle in the second elimination round were nullified due to La Salle's Jacqueline Alarca's ineligibility. Ateneo Lady Eagles first UAAP Final Four appearance since their admission in 1978. The exit of Ateneo's Charo Soriano.)
21	2009	Filoil Flying V Centre	La Salle	3–0	
22	2009	Filoil Flying V Centre	La Salle	3–2	(Note: DLSU Lady Spikers went on to bag their fifth UAAP women's volleyball championship title. The exit of La Salle's Manilla Santos, Celine Hernandez and Michelle Datuin.)
23	2010	Filoil Flying V Centre	La Salle	3–0	
24	2010	Filoil Flying V Centre	La Salle	3–1	(Note: Ateneo poses their first ever podium finish in UAAP women's volleyball, while La Salle would eventually lose to the UST Golden Tigresses in the Finals.)
25	2011	Filoil Flying V Centre	La Salle	3–1	
26	2011	Filoil Flying V Centre	La Salle	3–0	
27	February 19, 2011^	Filoil Flying V Centre	La Salle	3–2	(Note: The first UAAP Final Four match-up between the two rival teams. DLSU Lady Spikers went on to bag their sixth UAAP women's volleyball championship title. The exit of Ateneo's Carmina Acevedo and Bea Pascual, and La Salle's Jaqueline Alarca and Stephanie Mercado.)
28	December 3, 2011	Filoil Flying V Centre	La Salle	3–1	(Note: The renaissance of Philippine Volleyball with the entry of Victonara Galang, Mika Reyes and Alyssa Valdez.)
29	February 12, 2012	Filoil Flying V Centre	La Salle	3–2	
30	February 22, 2012*	Filoil Flying V Centre	Ateneo	3–1	(Note: Ateneo Lady Eagles first UAAP women's volleyball finals appearance and their first win in the finals against La Salle since their admission in 1978. The first UAAP women's volleyball Finals match-up between the top two rival teams.)
31	February 25, 2012*	Filoil Flying V Centre	La Salle	3–1	
32	February 29, 2012*	Filoil Flying V Centre	La Salle	3–0	(Note: DLSU Lady Spikers captured their second straight and seventh UAAP women's volleyball championship title, Abigail Maraño was awarded as the MVP of the season. The exit of La Salle's Cha Cruz who was adjudged as the MVP of the Finals.)
33	January 12, 2013	Filoil Flying V Centre	La Salle	3–2	
34	February 9, 2013	Smart Araneta Coliseum	La Salle	3–0	
35	March 2, 2013*	Smart Araneta Coliseum	La Salle	3–2	(Note: Their second straight UAAP women's volleyball finals match-up. Victonara Galang and Abigail Maraño were co-awarded as the MVP of the season.)
36	March 6, 2013*	SM Mall of Asia Arena	La Salle	3–0	(Note: DLSU Lady Spikers captured their third straight and eighth UAAP women's volleyball championship title. The exit of Ateneo's Fab 5, Fille Cainglet, Jamenea Ferrer, Dzi Gervacio, Gretchen Ho and Aillysse Nacachi, and La Salle's Melissa Gohing, Jeushl Wensh Tiu and Michele Gumabao who was adjudged as the MVP of the Finals.)
37	January 12, 2014	Smart Araneta Coliseum	La Salle	3–0	

No.	Date	Location	Winner	Score	Note/s
38	January 19, 2014	Filoil Flying V Arena	La Salle	3–0	
39	March 5, 2014*	Smart Araneta Coliseum	Ateneo	3–1	(Note: La Salle's first defeat in the season against the very promising squad of Ateneo after a league-record winning streak of 30 consecutive games since Season 75. Their third straight UAAP women's volleyball finals match-up.)
40	March 8, 2014*	Smart Araneta Coliseum	La Salle	3–1	
41	March 12, 2014*	SM Mall of Asia Arena	Ateneo	3–2	
42	March 15, 2014*	SM Mall of Asia Arena	Ateneo	3–0	(Note: First winner-take-all UAAP women's volleyball finals match since Season 71. Ateneo Lady Eagles captured their first UAAP women's volleyball championship title, Alyssa Valdez was awarded as the MVP of the season and the Finals. The exit of La Salle's Abigail Maraño.)
43	January 11, 2015	Smart Araneta Coliseum	Ateneo	3–2	
44	February 18, 2015	Smart Araneta Coliseum	Ateneo	3–1	
45	March 11, 2015*	Smart Araneta Coliseum	Ateneo	3–0	(Note: Their fourth straight UAAP women's volleyball finals match-up.)
46	March 14, 2015*	SM Mall of Asia Arena	Ateneo	3–0	(Note: Ateneo Lady Eagles captured their back-to-back and second UAAP women's volleyball championship title with a league-first perfect 16–0 season win sweep record, Ateneo's Alyssa Valdez was awarded as the MVP of the season and Amy Ahomiro as the MVP of the Finals. The exit of Ateneo's Denden Lazaro and Ella de Jesus.)
47	February 27, 2016	Smart Araneta Coliseum	La Salle	3–0	(Note: La Salle ends Ateneo's 24-game win streak.)
48	April 10, 2016	SM Mall of Asia Arena	Ateneo	3–2	
49	April 23, 2016*	Smart Araneta Coliseum	La Salle	3–0	(Note: Their fifth straight UAAP women's volleyball finals match-up.)
50	April 27, 2016*	SM Mall of Asia Arena	Ateneo	3–2	
51	April 30, 2016*	Smart Araneta Coliseum	La Salle	3–1	(Note: DLSU Lady Spikers captured their ninth UAAP women's volleyball championship title. The exit of La Salle's Cydthealee Demecillo, Victonara Galang and Mika Reyes, and Ateneo's Amy Ahomiro and Alyssa Valdez.)
52	March 4, 2017	SM Mall of Asia Arena	Ateneo	3–1	
53	April 8, 2017	Smart Araneta Coliseum	Ateneo	3–1	
54	May 2, 2017*	Smart Araneta Coliseum	La Salle	3–1	(Note: Their sixth straight UAAP women's volleyball finals match-up.)
55	May 6, 2017*	Smart Araneta Coliseum	La Salle	3–2	(Note: DLSU Lady Spikers captured their tenth UAAP women's volleyball championship title. The exit of La Salle's Kim Fajardo and Ateneo's Gizelle Tan. Also, Ateneo's Jia Morado decided not to continue her final year in the UAAP.)
56	March 3, 2018	SM Mall of Asia Arena	La Salle	3–1	(Note: Season 80 first round match.)
57	April 15, 2018	SM Mall of Asia Arena	La Salle	3–0	(Note: Season 80 second round match. The last Ateneo–La Salle game of La Salle's Mary Joy Baron, Kim Kianna Dy, and Dawn Macandili. This is also the last ADMU–DLSU game of Tai Bundit as head coach of Ateneo. Ateneo was eliminated by FEU in their Final Four match-up which ended their string of six consecutive Finals appearance. La Salle went on to sweep FEU in the Finals and claim their 11th UAAP women's volleyball championship title.)
58	February 17, 2019	SM Mall of Asia Arena	La Salle	3–1	(Note: Season 81 first round match. First Ateneo–La Salle game of Oliver Almadro as head coach of Ateneo and La Salle's Jolina Dela Cruz.)
59	April 13, 2019	Smart Araneta Coliseum	La Salle	3–0	(Note: Season 81 second round match. La Salle ends Ateneo's 10-game winning streak. This is also the last Ateneo–La Salle game of La Salle's Desiree Cheng, Lourdes Clemente, and May Luna; and Ateneo's Deanna Wong, Bea De Leon, Maddie Madayag, and Kim Gequillana. La Salle was eliminated in their Final Four match-up against UST, which ended their string of ten consecutive Finals appearance. Meanwhile, Ateneo went on to defeat UST in the Finals 2–1 to claim their third UAAP women's volleyball championship title.)
60	March 7, 2020	SM Mall of Asia Arena	La Salle	3–1	(Note: Season 82 first round match. First Ateneo–La Salle game of Ateneo's Faith Nisperos, and La Salle's Leila Cruz, Thea Gagate, Justine Jazareno and Jyne Soreño. This marked the only ADMU–DLSU game in UAAP Season 82, and was the last game of Ateneo's Kat Tolentino, Jhoanna Maraguinot and Pauline Gaston; and La Salle's Ernestine Tiamzon, Michelle Cobb and Aduke Ogunsanya in the UAAP. The season was cancelled on April 7, 2020, due to the COVID-19 pandemic.)
61	May 5, 2022	SM Mall of Asia Arena	La Salle	3–1	(Note: Season 84 first round match. First Ateneo–La Salle game of La Salle's Alleiah Malaluan and Ateneo's AC Miner. First opening day of the UAAP volleyball tournament since the beginning of the COVID-19 pandemic in the Philippines.)
62	June 7, 2022	SM Mall of Asia Arena	La Salle	3–2	(Note: Season 84 second round match. La Salle secures its fifth straight win of the season.)
63	June 16, 2022^	SM Mall of Asia Arena	La Salle	3–0	(Note: The second UAAP Final Four match-up between Ateneo and La Salle, and the exit of Ateneo's Dani Ravena and Erika Raagas, and La Salle's Erika Santos. La Salle dethrones Ateneo but loses to the NU Lady Bulldogs in the Finals, which completed a perfect 16-0 season win sweep record.)
64	March 5, 2023	SM Mall of Asia Arena	La Salle	3–0	(Note: Season 85 first round match. First Ateneo-La Salle game of La Salle's Angel Anne Canino. La Salle secures their third straight win as the remaining undefeated team of the season before losing to UST in the second round of eliminations to revert the UAAP women's volleyball post-season to a regular Final Four format for the first time since Season 81.)
65	April 23, 2023	SM Mall of Asia Arena	La Salle	3–0	(Note: Season 85 second round match. Exit of Ateneo's Vanie Gandler and Faith Nisperos, and La Salle's Mars Alba, Jolina Dela Cruz, Fifi Sharma, Leila Cruz and Justine Jazareno. La Salle secures the top seed in the Final Four while Ateneo was eventually ousted from Final Four contention by the UST Golden Tigresses in the same round, ending their streak of post-season appearances in UAAP women's volleyball dating from Season 72. La Salle went on to dethrone the NU Lady Bulldogs in the finals via sweep and win their 12th UAAP women's volleyball championship.)
66	March 2, 2024	SM Mall of Asia Arena	La Salle	3–0	(Note: Season 86 first round match. First Ateneo-La Salle game of Ateneo head coach Sergio Veloso after replacing Oliver Almadro.)
67	April 24, 2024	Smart Araneta Coliseum	La Salle	3–0	(Note: Season 86 second round match. Exit of Ateneo's Roma Mae Doromal and La Salle's Thea Gagate, Julia Coronel and Maicah Larroza. Ateneo misses the Final Four cut in consecutive seasons for the first time since Season 69, while La Salle would eventually be dethroned by the UST Golden Tigresses in their Final Four matchup.)
68	March 12, 2025	SM Mall of Asia Arena	La Salle	3–1	(Note: Season 87 first round match.)
69	April 2, 2025	Smart Araneta Coliseum	La Salle	3–0	(Note: Season 87 second round match. La Salle ends Ateneo's three-game win streak.)
70	March 1, 2026	Smart Araneta Coliseum	La Salle	3–1	(Note: Season 88 first round match.)
71	April 11, 2026	FilOil EcoOil Centre	La Salle	3–0	(Note: Season 88 second round match.)
Series: La Salle leads 57–14
(*) = finals games; (^) = semifinals; (≠) = seeding playoffs; (—) = forfeits

== Other sports ==
Both schools have also competed in various sports including 3x3 basketball, athletics (track and field), badminton, baseball, chess, football (soccer), judo, softball, swimming, taekwondo kyorugi and poomsae, tennis, and table tennis during various periods of the NCAA and UAAP.

=== 3x3 basketball ===
Ateneo won the UAAP Season 81 3x3 basketball tournament in 2019 on its second and final year as a demonstration sport. The 3x3 basketball tournament became an official sport in UAAP Season 82. Ateneo also won the women's and Junior High School boys' tournaments in UAAP Season 87. In Season 88, Ateneo retained its title in the Junior High School tournament. La Salle won four consecutive championships from UAAP Season 85 to Season 88 in the men's division.

=== Badminton ===
Ateneo has 14 titles whereas La Salle has six in terms of total seniors' badminton collegiate championships. In men's badminton, the first and most recent championship for La Salle came in 2007, while Ateneo has won the title in 1995, 1996, 2011, 2013, 2023, and 2025. In women's badminton, La Salle won in 2002, 2004, 2005, 2009, and 2017. Ateneo won in 2003, 2012, 2013, 2018, 2019, 2022, 2023, and 2025.

=== Baseball ===
In collegiate baseball, both Ateneo and La Salle have six championships each. Prior to Ateneo's 10-year curse, in 1991, La Salle lost to Ateneo 10–5 for Ateneo's last victory before the infamous losing streak. It took 13 years before Ateneo could beat La Salle when in 2004, Johnel Clemente's game-winning RBI single off La Salle pitcher Angel Gabriel nailed Ateneo's victory, 9–8. In 2006, Ateneo handed La Salle its first humiliating 10-run loss, 17–7, on Jonathan Sibal's 2-RBI single off pitcher Jeff Ardio which ended the game prematurely at the 8th inning (mercy rule). La Salle actually led 7–4 in the 4th inning before Ateneo exploded for 9 runs and put the game out of reach. In 2009, Ateneo and La Salle combined for what may be the highest scoring game in UAAP Baseball history when Ateneo defeated La Salle, 27–14. In UAAP Season 78, La Salle ended their 13-year title drought and dethroned Ateneo, who were the defending three-time champions. Both teams would meet again in the UAAP Season 81 Finals, where La Salle won their fifth championship title after defeating Ateneo in Game 3, 11–9. In the juniors' division, Ateneo has two NCAA titles and three UAAP titles for a total of five championship titles, while La Salle won all four of its championship titles in the UAAP.

=== Football (soccer) ===
Football, the most popular sport in the world, was also reported to be the top sport in the Philippines from the 1920s, 1930s, and shortly after World War II. In terms of the total number of collegiate and high school titles in the NCAA and UAAP combined La Salle leads Ateneo 67–19.

La Salle has the most number of collegiate championships in NCAA history with 21 versus Ateneo with six. The De La Salle Green Booters were 9-peat champions from 1932 through 1940. In the UAAP, La Salle also leads with a combined 15 titles, made up of four men's titles and 11 women's titles, versus Ateneo's eight men's titles. The Green Booters were back-to-back champions in UAAP Seasons 59 and 60, while the Lady Booters were 4-peat champions in UAAP Seasons 65 to 68, and 3-peat champions in UAAP Seasons 79 to 81. The Ateneo Lady Eagles have yet to win a title, while the Blue Eagles were 3-peat champions in UAAP Seasons 66 to 68, and won its most recent title in UAAP Season 81.

In the NCAA juniors division, La Salle has 30 titles versus Ateneo's three titles. The De La Salle Junior Archers were twice 5-peat champions from 1937 through 1941 and 1971 through 1976. In the UAAP, the Ateneo Blue Eaglets have two championships while the De La Salle Junior Archers have one title. In the inaugural UAAP Juniors Football Championship in Season 70, De La Salle Zobel won the demonstration championship. Ateneo won the demonstration championship the following year. In Season 72, Ateneo won the first official UAAP Juniors Football Championship.

=== Judo ===
In judo, Ateneo has the upper hand with eight collegiate titles while La Salle has two. La Salle's men's team won their first title in 1992 while the women's team won their first title in 2013 which ended La Salle's 21-year title drought. La Salle almost won their first Judo championships in Season 71 with three gold medals and Ateneo with two. Ateneo was able to clinch championships with bronze medals that boosted them to the overall championship. Ateneo also won the men's title in UAAP Season 78, and was declared co-champion in UAAP Season 80 with UST. In the juniors' division, Ateneo has nine championships while La Salle has yet to win a title.

=== Swimming ===
In collegiate swimming, Ateneo leads with 18 titles compared to La Salle's 17. La Salle was twice 3-peat champion in the men's division in UAAP Seasons 53 to 55 and Seasons 63 to 65. La Salle was also back-to-back champions in the women's division in UAAP Seasons 65 and 66. In UAAP Season 85, the DLSU Lady Tankers ended their 19-year championship drought. Ateneo has won 10 consecutive championships in the men's division in UAAP Seasons 77 to 88, and won three consecutive titles in the women's division in UAAP Seasons 80 to 82. In the juniors' division, La Salle has nine NCAA titles and four UAAP titles for a total of 13 championship titles, while Ateneo won all 12 of its championship titles in the UAAP.

=== Taekwondo Kyorugi and Poomsae ===
In another popular collegiate sport, taekwondo kyorugi, La Salle has 10 collegiate titles whereas Ateneo has no titles to date. The latest championship of La Salle came from the Green Jins in UAAP Season 87. In the juniors' division, Ateneo were 3-peat champions from UAAP Seasons 62 to 64. In taekwondo poomsae, Ateneo has yet to win a title, whereas La Salle has three championships.

== Cultural impact ==
Due to the numerous socialites watching the games live, La Salle head coach Franz Pumaren mentioned that "The janitors in the Araneta Coliseum would often say if there's an Ateneo–La Salle game, once everybody's out of the Coliseum, it still smells good because of all the socialites watching." In the late 1990s, former first daughter and actress Kris Aquino would call Ateneo head coach Joe Lipa to check on the team's progress, according to Ricky Dandan, Lipa's former assistant coach. Joel Banal, Ateneo's head coach from 2002 to 2003, used to have nightmares about La Salle's dreaded press, and considers the 2002 championship as his greatest accomplishment, after which Ateneo alums would pay for his restaurant bills. Moreover, Ateneo alumni installed the playing floor on the 2000 NBA All-Star Game to the Moro Lorenzo Sports Center, while International Container Terminal Services chairman and president Enrique K. Razon donated US$1 million to refurbish De La Salle University's sporting facilities at the Enrique M. Razon Sports Center.

Former DLSU Green Archers Basketball head team manager and financier, Danding Cojuangco of San Miguel Corporation, on his 78th birthday celebration in 2013 gave a ₱250 million check to the Brother President of DLSU. Boxing coach Freddie Roach, world-renowned trainer of eight-division boxing champion Manny Pacquiao, was in attendance and gave full support to the De La Salle Green Archers that battled against the Ateneo Blue Eagles on the first elimination round match-up between the two teams in UAAP Season 79. Asked about his support of La Salle, Roach said: "I like Notre Dame, I like Irish. I like green. I met the Green Archers yesterday (Saturday). I met the players and the coaches and I like them."

During the collegiate games between both schools, televised coverage would occasionally flash famous and notable alumni from entertainment, politics, business, education, and other fields watching and cheering from the sidelines. Former Ateneo cheerleader and Philippine senator Richard Gordon is renowned for sideline antics like jumping on the scorer's table to rile up the crowd. Gary Valenciano and Ogie Alcasid, two notable LSGH Kundirana and DLSU alumni, entertained the crowds during the UAAP Season 73 opening ceremonies hosted by DLSU for their university's 2011 centennial celebration. Actress Angelica Panganiban is known for attending the games of the Ateneo Lady Eagles, while comedian Ai-Ai delas Alas has shown support for the De La Salle Lady Spikers. Former NBA player Gilbert Arenas described the Ateneo–La Salle game as "Their college game would be like if it was Duke and Maryland playing each other and you split the crowd in half, 50–50. One side of their gym was blue and one side of their gym was green and everybody was just yelling."

== See also ==
- Battle of Katipunan
- Battle of the East
- La Salle–UST rivalry
- UP–UST rivalry
