= Battle of Katipunan =

School sports rivalry in the Philippines

Locations of (1) Ateneo and (2) UP

The Battle of Katipunan, also known as the Katipunan derby, refers to the school rivalry between Ateneo de Manila University and the University of the Philippines Diliman (UP) began during games and meets that preceded the establishing of the National Collegiate Athletic Association (NCAA), of which both schools were founding members, and continues in the University Athletic Association of the Philippines (UAAP) where both universities compete. After competing in the NCAA for several years, UP left the NCAA to co-found the UAAP. Ateneo joined the UAAP in 1978.

As the main campuses of both schools are located along Katipunan Avenue in Quezon City, games between Ateneo and UP are referred to as the "Battle of Katipunan".

The Ateneo teams are called the Ateneo Blue Eagles and the UP teams are called the UP Fighting Maroons.

== History ==
Friendly basketball games between Ateneo and UP were held in the 1920s. The games saw the introduction of organized cheerleading in the Philippines by Ateneo to boost their teams. In 1924, both schools co-founded the NCAA. UP left the NCAA in 1938 and co-founded the UAAP. Ateneo left the NCAA in 1978 due to violence in games, and joined the UAAP. Ateneo–UP basketball games were originally held in Intramuros.

== Basketball ==
Both schools have enjoyed success in basketball in both the NCAA and UAAP. In terms of total collegiate and high school basketball titles won in the NCAA and UAAP, Ateneo leads UP, 58–19. In men's basketball, Ateneo has a total of 26 championship titles whereas UP has eight. The Blue Eagles have 14 NCAA titles and 12 UAAP titles while the Fighting Maroons have four titles each in the NCAA and the UAAP. In juniors' basketball, Ateneo has 11 NCAA titles and 19 UAAP titles, for a total of 30, whereas UP has three NCAA titles and one UAAP title, for four in total. In women's basketball, both schools have only won titles in the UAAP as the NCAA does not have a women's basketball tournament, where UP leads Ateneo, 7–2.

The Ateneo Blue Eagles and the UP Fighting Maroons have met in the championship of the UAAP three times. Ateneo won in Season 81 in 2018, and in Season 85 held in 2022, whereas UP won in Season 84 in 2022.

=== Men's basketball results ===
==== Pre-Final Four era ====
Ateneo victories	UP victories

No.	Date	Location	Winner	Score	Ref.
1	1987		UP	83–79	
2	1987		Ateneo	88–56	
3	August 5, 1988	Rizal Memorial Coliseum	Ateneo	88–58	
4	September 4, 1988	Rizal Memorial Coliseum	UP	83–69	(Note: Match was abandoned by Ateneo with 1:21 left in the game after a bench-clearing brawl.)
5	August 20, 1989	Rizal Memorial Coliseum	UP	84–71	
(*) = finals games; (^) = semifinals; (≠) = seeding playoffs

==== Final Four era ====
Ateneo victories	UP victories

No.	Date	Location	Winner	Score	Ref.
1	July 26, 1994	Loyola Center	UP	76–74	
2	September 10, 1994	Loyola Center	UP	94–78	
3	August 12, 1995	Araneta Coliseum	UP	55–54	
4	September 17, 1995	Loyola Center	Ateneo	82–79	
5	August 17, 1996	Araneta Coliseum	UP	77–75	
6	September 18, 1996	Ninoy Aquino Stadium	UP	83–79	
7	August 2, 1997	Ninoy Aquino Stadium	Ateneo	70–66	
8	September 11, 1997	Loyola Center	Ateneo	73–62	
9	August 9, 1998	Loyola Center	UP	83–80	
10	September 20, 1998	Ninoy Aquino Stadium	Ateneo	81–78	
11	August 7, 1999	PhilSports Arena	Ateneo	64–54	
12	September 7, 1999	Ninoy Aquino Stadium	UP	74–71	
13	August 3, 2000	Rizal Memorial Coliseum	Ateneo	59–49	
14	August 31, 2000	Rizal Memorial Coliseum	Ateneo	72–68	
15	August 4, 2001	Loyola Center	Ateneo	63–50	
16	September 13, 2001	Loyola Center	UP	91–84	
17	July 28, 2002	Makati Coliseum	UP	53–49	(Note: Ateneo had a 3–0 record prior to the game.)
18	September 5, 2002	Araneta Coliseum	Ateneo	87–74	
19	August 2, 2003	Loyola Center	Ateneo	70–68	
20	August 31, 2003	Loyola Center	Ateneo	56–53	
21	July 25, 2004	Araneta Coliseum	Ateneo	72–63	
22	September 2, 2004	PhilSports Arena	UP	74–69	
23	July 30, 2005	Araneta Coliseum	Ateneo	71–63	
24	August 25, 2005	Blue Eagle Gym	Ateneo	67–57	
25	July 16, 2006	Ninoy Aquino Stadium	Ateneo	98–89	
26	August 20, 2006	Araneta Coliseum	Ateneo	98–88	(Note: Ateneo had a 7–0 record prior to the game.)
27	July 12, 2007	Ninoy Aquino Stadium	Ateneo	79–55	
28	September 6, 2007	Ninoy Aquino Stadium	Ateneo	93–59	
29	July 19, 2008	PhilSports Arena	Ateneo	83–66	
30	August 24, 2008	Araneta Coliseum	Ateneo	79–58	
31	July 26, 2009	PhilSports Arena	UP	68–58	
32	September 6, 2009	Filoil Flying V Arena	Ateneo	93–75	
33	August 5, 2010	Araneta Coliseum	Ateneo	78–53	
34	August 14, 2010	Araneta Coliseum	Ateneo	75–59	
35	July 30, 2011	Smart Araneta Coliseum	Ateneo	77–57	(Note: Ateneo had a 4–0 record prior to the game.)
36	September 1, 2011	Smart Araneta Coliseum	Ateneo	73–58	(Note: Ateneo had an 11–0 record prior to the game.)
37	August 2, 2012	Smart Araneta Coliseum	Ateneo	76–70	
38	August 25, 2012	SM Mall of Asia Arena	Ateneo	73–66	

No.	Date	Location	Winner	Score	Ref.
39	July 21, 2013	SM Mall of Asia Arena	Ateneo	72–64	
40	August 15, 2013	Smart Araneta Coliseum	Ateneo	67–59	
41	July 22, 2014	SM Mall of Asia Arena	Ateneo	86–75	(Note: Ateneo had a 2–0 record prior to the game.)
42	September 3, 2014	Smart Araneta Coliseum	Ateneo	70–69	
43	September 30, 2015	SM Mall of Asia Arena	Ateneo	56–43	
44	November 4, 2015	Smart Araneta Coliseum	Ateneo	74–65	
45	September 28, 2016	SM Mall of Asia Arena	Ateneo	79–64	
46	October 8, 2016	SM Mall of Asia Arena	UP	56–52	
47	September 13, 2017	Smart Araneta Coliseum	Ateneo	92–71	
48	November 8, 2017	Smart Araneta Coliseum	Ateneo	96–82	(Note: Ateneo had a 12–0 record prior to the game.)
49	September 12, 2018	Smart Araneta Coliseum	Ateneo	83–66	
50	October 14, 2018	SM Mall of Asia Arena	Ateneo	87–79	
51	December 1, 2018*	SM Mall of Asia Arena	Ateneo	88–79	
52	December 5, 2018*	Smart Araneta Coliseum	Ateneo	99–81	
53	September 29, 2019	Smart Araneta Coliseum	Ateneo	89–63	(Note: Ateneo had a 6–0 record prior to the game.)
54	October 30, 2019	SM Mall of Asia Arena	Ateneo	86–64	(Note: Ateneo had a 13–0 record prior to the game.)
55	March 26, 2022	SM Mall of Asia Arena	Ateneo	90–81	(Note: Opening day game.)
56	May 1, 2022	SM Mall of Asia Arena	UP	84–83	
57	May 8, 2022*	SM Mall of Asia Arena	UP	81–74^{OT}	
58	May 11, 2022*	SM Mall of Asia Arena	Ateneo	69–66	
59	May 13, 2022*	SM Mall of Asia Arena	UP	72–69^{OT}	
60	October 16, 2022	SM Mall of Asia Arena	UP	76–71^{OT}	
61	November 26, 2022	Smart Araneta Coliseum	Ateneo	75–67	
62	December 11, 2022*	SM Mall of Asia Arena	UP	72–66	
63	December 14, 2022*	Smart Araneta Coliseum	Ateneo	65–55	
64	December 19, 2022*	Smart Araneta Coliseum	Ateneo	75–68	
65	October 22, 2023	SM Mall of Asia Arena	Ateneo	99–89^{OT}	(Note: UP had a 6–0 record prior to the game.)
66	October 29, 2023	Smart Araneta Coliseum	UP	65–60	
67	November 25, 2023^	Smart Araneta Coliseum	UP	57–46	(Note: UP had a 4–0 record prior to the game and dethroned defending champion Ateneo in the semifinals.)
68	September 7, 2024	Smart Araneta Coliseum	UP	77–61	(Note: Opening day game.)
69	October 30, 2024	SM Mall of Asia Arena	UP	75–47	
70	October 8, 2025	SM Mall of Asia Arena	UP	83–69	
71	November 19, 2025	SM Mall of Asia Arena	UP	79–75	
72	September 19, 2026	Smart Araneta Coliseum	UP	94–75	
73	November 7, 2026	Smart Araneta Coliseum	UP	82–74	
Series: Ateneo leads 48–25
(*) = finals games; (^) = semifinals; (≠) = seeding playoffs

=== Final Four Rankings ===
For comparison, these are the elimination round rankings of these two teams since the Final Four format was introduced.

==== Seniors' division ====
A.Y.	Ateneo	UP
1993–1994	6th	7th
1994–1995	6th	5th
1995–1996	7th	5th
1996–1997	5th	3rd
1997–1998	6th	4th
1998–1999	6th	5th
1999–2000	3rd	6th
2000–2001	2nd	6th
2001–2002	2nd	7th
2002–2003	3rd	6th
2003–2004	1st	7th
2004–2005	3rd	5th
2005–2006	3rd	5th
2006–2007	1st	6th
2007–2008	3rd	8th
2008–2009	1st	6th
2009–2010	1st	8th
2010–2011	2nd	8th
2011–2012	1st	8th
2012–2013	1st	8th
2013–2014	5th	8th
2014–2015	1st	7th
2015–2016	3rd	7th
2016–2017	2nd	6th
2017–2018	1st	5th
2018–2019	1st	2nd
2019–2020	1st	2nd
2021–2022	1st	2nd
2022–2023	1st	2nd
2023–2024	4th	1st
2024–2025	8th	2nd

== Other sports ==
=== Football ===
UP leads Ateneo in total championships won, 20–19, with the lone women's title for the Fighting Maroons in UAAP Season 78 being the difference.

Ateneo has six NCAA men's titles, three NCAA boys' titles, and 10 UAAP men's titles. On the other hand, UP has 19 UAAP men's titles and one UAAP women's title.

Ateneo and UP have twice faced off in the UAAP men's football championship finals, with each school prevailing once.

=== Volleyball ===
Ateneo leads UP in terms of total championships won, 15–12. Ateneo has two NCAA men's titles, one NCAA women's title, and six NCAA boys' titles, as well as three UAAP men's titles and three UAAP women's titles. UP has four UAAP men's titles, and eight UAAP women's titles.

== See also ==
- Ateneo–La Salle rivalry
- Battle of the East
- La Salle–UST rivalry
- UP–UST rivalry
