= Battle of the East =

College basketball rivalry

FEU–UE Rivalry
Last Meeting	November 4, 2026 (94–83, FEU)
Next Meeting	TBA
Current Streak
History
Pennant Era	Tied 2–2
1960 UAAP Finals	UE won, 87–86
1961 UAAP Finals	FEU won, 105–84
1975 UAAP Finals	UE won, 85–80
1976 UAAP Finals	FEU won, 91–82
UAAP Final Four	4–1 (FEU)
1998 UAAP Basketball Semifinals	FEU won, 81–68, 83–61
2003 UAAP Basketball Semifinals	FEU won, 67–63
2004 UAAP Basketball Semifinals	FEU won, 71–64
2005 UAAP Basketball Semifinals	FEU won, 78–57
2009 UAAP Basketball Semifinals	UE won, 84–74, 78–72
Philippine Collegiate Championship	Series tied 1–1
2002 PCC Championship	UE won, 2–0
2004 PCC Championship	FEU won, 1–0
Men's Basketball Records
UAAP Final Four Appearances: FEU – 22; UE – 12; UAAP Championships: FEU – 20 (1st); UE – 18 (tied for 2nd with UST); Final Four format first introduced in 1993

Locations of FEU and UE

The "Battle of the East", also known as the Battle of Morayta (Note: Refers to Morayta Street, now Nicanor Reyes Street, a road that runs between the two universities) is a college rivalry between the Far Eastern University Tamaraws and University of the East Red Warriors. They have a combined 38 UAAP Basketball titles.

== History ==
FEU left the National Collegiate Athletic Association in 1936 and later on to form the University Athletic Association of the Philippines along with University of Santo Tomas, National University and the University of the Philippines in 1938. UE was part of the first UAAP expansion with Adamson University in 1952. It did not take long for the Warriors to dominate since joining the league as it holds the longest finals appearance with 16 from 1957 to 1972, including a seven straight title run from 1965 to 1971 (1967 title to be shared with UST), with FEU winning the title in 1961 and 1972.

== Notable Games ==
=== 1960 UAAP Finals ===
UE stormed back from 81–75 with three minutes left to play at the half to complete an upset, 87–86 taking the El Oro trophy home in front of a crowded Rizal Memorial Coliseum. A run started with Norman de Vera's two free throws after being fouled by Rohimust Santos to cut the lead, while sophomore Rizaldo Pabillore came up with two interceptions all within the last three minutes of the second half to earn their third title.

=== 1961 UAAP Second Round Eliminations ===
UE subdued FEU, 78–74 in the second round of the UAAP basketball series at the Rizal Memorial Coliseum. But the jam-packed crowd of 9,000 (over maximum capacity of the coliseum) got an unexpected show after the final buzzer when cagers from both teams engaged in an impromptu brawl on the floor. The fight was triggered off by a last-second scuffle for the ball between Tamaraw Romy Diaz and Warrior Carlos Quitzon. Quitzon had the ball and was being harassed by Diaz when the buzzer sounded and hell broke loose. Searing blast by lanky Jimmy Mariano and clutch baskets by Jose Sison and Wenceslao Olaguera at the homestretch saved the Warriors after they were behind by six points. Mariano scored twice on a twisting shot to regain the lead for UE, 63–60, with five minutes left in the game. The two schools met again in the finals with FEU winning the championship.

=== 1981 UAAP Finals ===
With the game on the line, University of the East rookie Allan Caidic, with the chance of beating the rival FEU to win the championship, missed both free throws and let the Tamaraws led by Glenn Capacio steal the 1981 title. Caidic, with the rest of UE squad, won the championship the following year after beating the University of the Philippines.

=== 2009 UAAP Semifinals ===
Holding a twice to beat advantage, the second-seeded Tamaraws fell short during the Game 1 of the series, 74–84, without their sophomore guard Mark Barroca, who was accused of game-fixing prior to his performance on the team's last stretch of the elimination. Going on to the second game of the series, a much favored FEU, despite a 49–39 lead at the half, once again took the beating as Paul Lee and the Warriors pulled an upset and entered the finals with the score of 72–78 to face Ateneo.

== Game Results ==
=== Final Four Era ===
FEU victories	UE victories

No.	Date	Location	Winner	Score	Note/s
1	1996		UE	1–0	
2	1996		UE	1–0	
3	1997		FEU	1–0	
4	1997		FEU	1–0	
5	1998^		UE	81–68	(Note: UE forced a rubber match.)
6	1998^		FEU	83–61	(Note: FEU utilized its twice-to-beat advantage as the #2 seed to advance to the Finals.)
7	1999		FEU	1–0	
8	1999		FEU	1–0	
9	July 29, 2000	Ninoy Aquino Stadium	FEU	74–62	
10	September 16, 2000	Araneta Coliseum	UE	67–65^{OT}	
11	August 5, 2001	Loyola Center	FEU	78–67	
12	August 26, 2001	Loyola Center	UE	68–63	
13	August 3, 2002	Makati Coliseum	UE	65–58	
14	August 29, 2002	Makati Coliseum	UE	80–75	
15	August 3, 2003	Blue Eagle Gym	FEU	64–62	
16	August 30, 2003	Araneta Coliseum	UE	77–72	
17	September 20, 2003≠	Araneta Coliseum	#2 FEU	80–75	(Note: 2nd seed-playoff.)
18	September 24, 2003^	Araneta Coliseum	FEU	80–75	(Note: Semifinals. FEU won in the finals vs. Ateneo.)
19	July 10, 2004	Araneta Coliseum	FEU	89–61	(Note: Opening day game.)
20	August 21, 2004	Cuneta Astrodome	FEU	64–62	
21	September 16, 2004^	PhilSports Arena	FEU	71–64	(Note: Semifinals. FEU lost in the finals vs. La Salle, however, all of La Salle's games were forfeited from Seasons 66 to 68. The UAAP Board subsequently awarded the trophy to FEU in 2006.)
22	July 9, 2005	Araneta Coliseum	FEU	82–66	(Note: Opening day game.)
23	August 14, 2005	Araneta Coliseum	UE	62–57	(Note: FEU had a 7-0 record prior to the game.)
24	September 25, 2005^	Araneta Coliseum	FEU	78–57	(Note: Semifinals. FEU won in the finals vs. La Salle.)
25	July 15, 2006	Ninoy Aquino Stadium	UE	92–84^{OT}	
26	August 20, 2006	Araneta Coliseum	UE	76–63	
27	August 2, 2007	Ninoy Aquino Stadium	UE	89–60	(Note: UE had a 5-0 record prior to the game.)
28	September 1, 2007	Cuneta Astrodome	UE	79–72	(Note: UE had an 11-0 record prior to the game.)
29	July 26, 2008	PhilSports Arena	FEU	71–69	
30	September 4, 2008	Araneta Coliseum	UE	73–61	
31	August 9, 2009	Araneta Coliseum	FEU	76–72	
32	August 23, 2009	Araneta Coliseum	UE	87–72	
33	September 19, 2009^	Araneta Coliseum	UE	84–74	(Note: Semifinals. UE forced a rubber match.)
34	September 24, 2009^	Araneta Coliseum	UE	78–72	(Note: Semifinals. UE lost in the finals vs. Ateneo.)

No.	Date	Location	Winner	Score	Note/s
35	July 22, 2010	Araneta Coliseum	FEU	91–81	(Note: FEU had a 2-0 record prior to the game.)
36	August 15, 2010	PhilSports Arena	FEU	83–77^{OT}	
37	July 21, 2011	Araneta Coliseum	FEU	66–47	
38	September 4, 2011	Smart Araneta Coliseum	FEU	78–69	
39	July 29, 2012	Mall of Asia Arena	FEU	92–66	(Note: FEU had a 3-0 record prior to the game.)
40	September 8, 2012	Mall of Asia Arena	FEU	83–78	
41	June 29, 2013	Mall of Asia Arena	FEU	89–78	(Note: Opening day game.)
42	August 25, 2013	Smart Araneta Coliseum	FEU	98–94^{2OT}	
43	July 30, 2014	Mall of Asia Arena	FEU	73–63	
44	September 7, 2014	Smart Araneta Coliseum	UE	94–71	
45	September 23, 2015	Mall of Asia Arena	FEU	92–81	
46	October 24, 2015	Smart Araneta Coliseum	FEU	71–67	
47	September 18, 2016	Smart Araneta Coliseum	FEU	67–59	
48	November 16, 2016	Mall of Asia Arena	FEU	64–61	
49	September 13, 2017	Smart Araneta Coliseum	FEU	90–83	
50	November 5, 2017	Smart Araneta Coliseum	FEU	79–63	
51	September 30, 2018	Mall of Asia Arena	UE	90–65	
52	November 4, 2018	Ynares Center	FEU	80–61	
53	September 8, 2019	Smart Araneta Coliseum	FEU	81–65	
54	October 27, 2019	Ynares Center	FEU	82–58	
55	April 5, 2022	Mall of Asia Arena	FEU	88–74	
56	April 23, 2022	Mall of Asia Arena	FEU	91–61	
57	October 5, 2022	PhilSports Arena	UE	76–66	
58	October 30, 2022	Smart Araneta Coliseum	FEU	75–68	
59	October 7, 2023	Smart Araneta Coliseum	UE	65–58	
60	November 5, 2023	Mall of Asia Arena	UE	87–86^{OT}	
61	September 18, 2024	Smart Araneta Coliseum	UE	62–56	
62	November 3, 2024	Quadricentennial Pavilion	FEU	59–51	
63	October 19, 2025	Smart Araneta Coliseum	FEU	95–76	
64	November 22, 2025	Smart Araneta Coliseum	FEU	84–77	
65	September 26, 2026	Mall of Asia Arena	FEU	93–70	
66	November 3, 2026	Smart Araneta Coliseum	FEU	94–83	
Series: FEU leads 43–23
(*) = finals games; (^) = semifinals; (≠) = seeding playoffs

=== Final Four Rankings ===
For comparison, these are the elimination round rankings of these two teams since the Final Four format was introduced.

==== Seniors' division ====
A.Y.	FEU	UE
1993–1994	4th	5th
1994–1995	4th	2nd
1995–1996	4th	3rd
1996–1997	6th	4th
1997–1998	1st	5th
1998–1999	2nd	3rd
1999–2000	4th	5th
2000–2001	3rd	5th
2001–2002	3rd	5th
2002–2003	5th	2nd
2003–2004	2nd	3rd
2004–2005	1st	4th
2005–2006	1st	4th
2006–2007	5th	2nd
2007–2008	5th	1st
2008–2009	3rd	4th
2009–2010	2nd	3rd
2010–2011	1st	6th
2011–2012	3rd	7th
2012–2013	5th	7th
2013–2014	3rd	6th
2014–2015	2nd	5th
2015–2016	2nd	6th
2016–2017	3rd	7th
2017–2018	4th	7th
2018–2019	4th	8th
2019–2020	3rd	7th
2021–2022	4th	8th
2022–2023	7th	6th
2023–2024	7th	6th
2024–2025	6th	5th
2025–2026	5th	8th

=== Offseason meetings ===
FEU victories	UE victories

No.	Date	Location	Winner	Score	Tournament
1	November 26, 2003	Makati Coliseum	UE	82–58	PCCL
2	November 27, 2003	Makati Coliseum	UE	57–55	PCCL
3	February 27, 2005	Makati Coliseum	FEU	69–49	PCCL

No.	Date	Location	Winner	Score	Tournament
4	December 2, 2009	Ynares Sports Arena	FEU	86–85	PCCL
Series: Tied 2–2
(*) = finals games; (^) = semifinals; (≠) = seeding playoffs

== Volleyball Statistics ==
=== Men's volleyball results ===
FEU victories	UE victories

No.	Date	Location	Winner	Score	Note/s
1	2007		FEU	1–0	
2	2007		FEU	1–0	
3	2008		FEU	1–0	
4	2008		FEU	1–0	
5	2009		FEU	1–0	
6	2009		FEU	1–0	
7	2010		UE	1–0	
8	2010		FEU	1–0	
9	2011	Filoil Flying V Arena	FEU	3–0	
10	2011	Filoil Flying V Arena	FEU	3–0	
11	2012	Filoil Flying V Arena	FEU	3–1	
12	2012	Filoil Flying V Arena	FEU	3–0	
13	2013	Filoil Flying V Arena	FEU	3–0	
14	2013	Filoil Flying V Arena	FEU	3–0	
15	2014	Filoil Flying V Arena	FEU	3–2	
16	2014	Filoil Flying V Arena	FEU	3–0	
17	2015		FEU	3–2	
18	2015		FEU	3–1	
19	2016		FEU	3–0	

No.	Date	Location	Winner	Score	Note/s
20	2016		FEU	3–1	
21	2017		FEU	3–2	
22	2017		FEU	3–0	
23	2018		FEU	3–0	
24	2018		FEU	3–0	
25	2019		FEU	3–0	
26	2019		FEU	3–0	
27	March 3, 2020	Mall of Asia Arena	FEU	3–0	
28	2023		FEU	3–1	
29	2023		UE	3–2	
30	2024		FEU	3–0	
31	2024		FEU	3–1	
32	2025		FEU	3–0	
33	2025		FEU	3–1	
34	February 18, 2026	Quadricentennial Pavilion	FEU	3–0	
35	March 18, 2026	Smart Araneta Coliseum	FEU	3–1	
Series: FEU leads 33–2
(*) = finals games; (^) = semifinals; (≠) = seeding playoffs

=== Women's volleyball results ===
FEU victories	UE victories

No.	Date	Location	Winner	Score	Note/s
1	2007		FEU	1–0	
2	2007		FEU	1–0	
3	February 11, 2007≠		FEU	3–0	
4	2008		FEU	1–0	
5	2008		FEU	1–0	
6	2009		FEU	1–0	
7	2009		FEU	1–0	
8	2010		FEU	3–1	
9	2010		FEU	3–0	
10	2011	Filoil Flying V Arena	UE	3–1	
11	2011	Filoil Flying V Arena	FEU	3–1	
12	2012	Filoil Flying V Arena	FEU	3–0	
13	2012	Filoil Flying V Arena	FEU	3–0	
14	2013	Filoil Flying V Arena	FEU	3–0	
15	2013	Filoil Flying V Arena	FEU	3–0	
16	2014	Filoil Flying V Arena	FEU	3–0	
17	2014	Filoil Flying V Arena	FEU	3–1	
18	2015		FEU	3–0	
19	2015		FEU	3–1	
20	2016		FEU	3–1	

No.	Date	Location	Winner	Score	Note/s
21	2016		FEU	3–0	
22	2017		FEU	3–1	
23	2017		FEU	3–0	
24	2018		FEU	3–1	
25	2018		FEU	3–0	
26	2019		FEU	3–2	
27	2019		FEU	3–2	
28	2020	Mall of Asia Arena	FEU	3–0	
29	2022	Mall of Asia Arena	FEU	3–2	
30	2022	Mall of Asia Arena	UE	3–1	
31	2023		FEU	3–2	
32	2023		FEU	3–1	
33	2024		FEU	3–2	
34	2024		FEU	3–1	
35	2025		FEU	3–0	
36	March 26, 2025	Filoil EcoOil Centre	FEU	3–0	
37	February 18, 2026	Quadricentennial Pavilion	FEU	3–0	
38	March 18, 2026	Smart Araneta Coliseum	FEU	3–1	
Series: FEU leads 36–2
(*) = finals games; (^) = semifinals; (≠) = seeding playoffs

== See also ==
- Ateneo–La Salle rivalry
- Battle of Katipunan
- La Salle–UST rivalry
- UP–UST rivalry
