= Jayvee Gayoso =

Filipino former basketball player and coach

Personal information
- Born: April 9, 1966 (age 60)
- Listed height: 6 ft 2 in (1.88 m)
- Listed weight: 190 lb (86 kg)

Career information
- College: Ateneo
- PBA draft: 1991: 1st round, 5th overall pick
- Drafted by: Ginebra San Miguel
- Playing career: 1991–2001
- Position: Shooting guard / Small forward
- Number: 11

Career history

Playing
- 1991–1998: Ginebra San Miguel
- 1999–2000: Tanduay Rhum Masters

Coaching
- 2019–2020: Rizal Crusaders

Career highlights
- As player: 2× PBA champion (1991 First, 1997 Commissioner's); 2× UAAP champion (1987, 1988)

Jaime Vicente "Jayvee" Gayoso (born April 9, 1966) is a former Filipino basketball player, former coach and sports commentator. He was nicknamed "Mr. Adrenaline".

== Playing career ==
=== Collegiate ===
Gayoso played with Danny Francisco, Eric Reyes, future PBA star Olsen Racela, and UAAP MVP Jun Reyes in Ateneo Blue Eagles, and won championship against Jerry Codiñera-led UE in 1987 and Dindo Pumaren-led La Salle in 1988.

=== Professional ===
Gayoso was drafted by Ginebra in 1991 draft, and played for the team until 1998. He later played for Tanduay Rhum Masters, and while at the Rhum Masters, the team has alleged salary violations which proven false.

== Coaching ==
Gayoso was the head coach of Rizal Crusaders in the MPBL from 2019 until 2020.

== Commentary ==
Gayoso started his commentary career at PBA coverages on NBN in 2003. He also worked the same for Maharlika Pilipinas Basketball League.

== Executive career ==
Gayoso became Luzon deputy commissioner for Pilipinas Super League in 2023.

== Acting career ==
Gayoso became actor and appeared in some movies.

== Personal life ==
He is the father of football player Jarvey Gayoso.
