= UE Red Warriors basketball =

Philippine collegiate varsity team

UE Red Warriors
2026 UE Red Warriors basketball team
- University: University of the East
- Head coach: Paulo Hubalde (interim season)
- Location: Sampaloc, Manila
- Nickname: UE Red Warriors
- Colors: Red and White

UAAP Champion (18)
- 1957; 1958; 1960; 1962; 1963; 1965; 1966; 1967; 1968; 1969; 1970; 1971; 1974; 1975; 1978; 1982; 1984; 1985

PCCL Champion (2)
- 2003; 2006

The UE Red Warriors are the collegiate men's basketball team of the University of the East, which play in the University Athletic Association of the Philippines (UAAP), the premiere sports league in the country.

== History ==
The UE Red Warriors holds the longest senior basketball championship run with seven straight UAAP titles. They also hold the longest finals streak appearances, with sixteen straight from 1957 to 1972. The team has also represented the country at the 1967 Summer Universiade.

As of 2023, The Red Warriors were tied with the University of Santo Tomas as the second most successful team in UAAP men's basketball, with 18 titles, most of them coming from the time of coach Baby Dalupan and Robert Jaworski.

== Current roster ==
UE Red Warriors roster
Players
Coaches

Pos.	No.	Nat.	Name	Height	Year	High School
F	0	(Philippines)	Nurjadden Datumalim	6'3" (1.91m)	2nd	–
G/F	1	(Canada)	Cole Cruz-Dumont	6'4" (1.93m)	2nd	Vancouver College
G	2	(United States)	Mariano Tañedo	5'10" (1.78m)	2nd	–
G	4	(Philippines)	Kristopher Lagat	6'0" (1.83m)	2nd	–
G	7	(Philippines)	Axle Javier	6'0" (1.83m)	1st	–
F	8	(Guam)	Daryll Robles (C)	6'6" (1.98m)	3rd	Father Dueñas Memorial School
G/F	9	(United States)	Kyle Perez	6'4" (1.93m)	1st	–
F	12	(United States)	Edoukok Assouan	6'1" (1.85m)	1st	–
G	14	(Philippines)	Gene Carllo	6'1" (1.85m)	1st	–
F/C	16	(Philippines)	John Dexter Santos	6'5" (1.96m)	1st	–
G/F	19	(Philippines)	Jozef Sigfrid Apostol	6'3" (1.91m)	1st	–
C	24	(Philippines)	Drew Jimenez	6'9" (2.06m)	5th	Arellano University
PF	29	(Philippines)	Kean Dungca	6'4" (1.93m)	1st	–
G	30	(United States)	Colby Vazquez	6'1" (1.85m)	5th	–
C	34	(Nigeria)	Ajani Olamilekan	6'8" (2.03m)	1st	–
G	54	(Philippines)	Lance Sabroso	5'10" (1.78m)	2nd	–

Head coach

- (Philippines) Paulo Hubalde

Assistant coach(es)

- (Philippines) Alex Cabagnot (Lead Assistant Coach)
- (Philippines) Don Allado
- (Philippines) KG Canaleta
- (Philippines) LA Revilla
- (Philippines) RJ Argamino
- (Philippines) Melvin Reyes
- (Philippines) Louie Vigil
- (Philippines) John Mari Quilang
- (Philippines) William Arroyo
- (Philippines) Carlo Perigeino De Dios
- (Philippines) Allan Caidic

Team manager

- (Philippines) Jean Michael Alabanza

Legend

- (C) Team captain
- Injured

== Head coaches ==
- 1952–54: Gabriel Fajardo
- 1955–71: Baby Dalupan
- 1972–78: Pilo Pumaren
- 1979–80: Rhoel Nadurata
- 1981: Roberto Flores
- 1982: Agapito De Castro
- 1983: Roberto Flores
- 1984–85: Jimmy Mariano
- 1986: Johnny Revilla
- 1987–90: Rhoel Nadurata
- 1991: Rudy Soriano
- 1992: Johnny Revilla
- 1993–97: Francis Rodriguez
- 1998–99: Jimmy Mariano
- 2000: Angelito Esguerra
- 2001–03: Boyzie Zamar
- 2004–08: Dindo Pumaren
- 2009–10: Lawrence Chongson
- 2011–12: Jerry Codiñera
- 2012–13: Boyzie Zamar
- 2014–2017: Derrick Pumaren
- 2018: Joe Silva
- 2019: Bong Tan
- 2020–2024: Jack Santiago
- 2025–2026: Chris Gavina
- 2026–present: Paulo Hubalde

== Season-by-season records ==
Until 1997, the UAAP primarily ranked the teams by tournament points using FIBA's method. Starting in 1998, the UAAP primarily ranked by winning percentage. There's no difference in ranking once all games were played, but in the middle of the season, rankings made by these two methods may differ.

=== Until 1997 ===
Season	League	Elimination round					Playoffs			
Season	League	Pos	GP	W	L	Pts	GP	W	L	Results
1986	UAAP	1st/8					2	0	2	Lost Finals vs UP
1987	UAAP	2nd/8	14	10	4	24	1	0	1	Lost Finals vs Ateneo
1988	UAAP	5th/8	14	6	8	20	Did not qualify			
1989	UAAP	3rd/8	14	9	5	23	Did not qualify			
1990	UAAP	2nd/8	14	9	5	23	3	2	1	Lost Finals vs La Salle
1991	UAAP	7th/8	14	2	12	18	Did not qualify			
1992	UAAP	7th/8	14	1	13	16	Did not qualify			
1993	UAAP	5th/8	14	6	8	20	No playoffs held (Note: UST won all elimination round games. Based on the rules at that time, they were then named automatic champions, and other teams were ranked by elimination round finish.)			
1994	UAAP	2nd/7	12	9	3	21	2	0	2	Lost semifinals vs UST
1995	UAAP	3rd/8	14	10	4	24	1	0	1	Lost semifinals vs La Salle
1996	UAAP	4th/8	14	8	6	22	1	0	1	Lost semifinals vs La Salle
1997	UAAP	5th/8	14	6	8	20	Did not qualify			

=== Since 1998 ===
Season	League	Elimination round						Playoffs			
Season	League	Pos	GP	W	L	PCT	GB	GP	W	L	Results
1998	UAAP	3rd/8	14	7	7	.500	6	2	1	1	Lost semifinals vs FEU
1999	UAAP	5th/8	14	6	8	.429	5	Did not qualify			
2000	UAAP	5th/8	14	8	6	.571	4	1	0	1	Lost 4th seed playoff vs UST
2001	UAAP	5th/8	14	7	7	.500	5	1	0	1	Lost 4th seed playoff vs NU
2002	UAAP	2nd/8	14	10	4	.714	3	2	0	2	Lost semifinals vs Ateneo
2003	UAAP	3rd/8	14	11	3	.786	—	2	0	2	Lost semifinals vs FEU
2004	UAAP	4th/8	14	8	6	.571	3	1	0	1	Lost semifinals vs FEU
2005	UAAP	4th/8	14	10	4	.714	2	2	0	2	Lost semifinals vs FEU
2006	UAAP	2nd/7	12	8	4	.667	2	2	0	2	Lost semifinals vs UST
2007	UAAP	1st/8	14	14	0	1.000	—	2	0	2	Lost Finals to La Salle
2008	UAAP	4th/8	14	9	5	.643	4	1	0	1	Lost semifinals vs Ateneo
2009	UAAP	3rd/8	14	10	4	.714	3	5	3	2	Lost Finals to Ateneo
2010	UAAP	6th/8	14	6	8	.429	6	Did not qualify			
2011	UAAP	7th/8	14	3	11	.214	10	Did not qualify			
2012	UAAP	7th/8	14	3	11	.214	9	Did not qualify			
2013	UAAP	6th/8	14	7	7	.500	3	Did not qualify			
2014	UAAP	5th/8	14	9	5	.643	2	1	0	1	Lost 4th seed playoff vs NU
2015	UAAP	6th/8	14	6	8	.429	5	Did not qualify			
2016	UAAP	7th/8	14	3	11	.214	10	Did not qualify			
2017	UAAP	7th/8	14	3	11	.214	10	Did not qualify			
2018	UAAP	8th/8	14	1	13	.071	11	Did not qualify			
2019	UAAP	7th/8	14	4	10	.286	10	Did not qualify			
2020 (Note: Season cancelled due to the COVID-19 pandemic.)	UAAP	Season canceled									
2022 (S84)	UAAP	8th/8	14	0	14	.000	13	Did not qualify			
2022 (S85)	UAAP	6th/8	14	5	9	.357	6	Did not qualify			
2023	UAAP	6th/8	14	4	10	.286	8	Did not qualify			
2024	UAAP	5th/8	14	6	8	.429	6	1	0	1	Lost 4th seed playoff vs Adamson
2025	UAAP	8th/8	14	0	14	.000	11	Did not qualify			

== Honors ==
=== Team honors ===
- University Athletic Association of the Philippines (UAAP)
  - Champions (18): 1957, 1958, 1960, 1962, 1963, 1965, 1966, 1967, 1968, 1969, 1970, 1971, 1974, 1975, 1978, 1982, 1984, 1985
- Filoil EcoOil Preseason Cup
  - Champions (1): 2008, 2013

=== Player honors ===
- UAAP Most Valuable Player
  - Roehl Nadurata (1): 1960
  - Robert Jaworski (1): 1965
  - Allan Caidic (3): 1982, 1984, 1985
  - James Yap (1): 2003
- UAAP Rookie of the Year
  - Robert Jaworski: 1964
  - Bobby Diloy: 1994
  - Marcy Arellano: 2004

== Notable players ==
- (Senegal) Adama Diakhite
- (Philippines) Allan Caidic
- (Philippines) Alvin Pasaol
- (Philippines) (Indonesia) Biboy Enguio
- (Philippines) Bonbon Custodio
- (Philippines) Bong Galanza
- (Philippines) Bong Ravena
- (Sierra Leone) Charles Mammie
- (Philippines) Chris Javier
- (Philippines) Constancio Ortiz
- (Philippines) Derrick Pumaren
- (Philippines) Pilo Pumaren
- (Philippines) Elmer Espiritu
- (Philippines) Hans Thiele
- (Philippines) Jimmy Martinez
- (Philippines) James Yap
- (Philippines) Jerry Codiñera
- (Philippines) Jimmy Mariano
- (Philippines) Jolly Escobar
- (Philippines) KG Canaleta
- (Philippines) Marcy Arellano
- (Philippines) Mark Borboran
- (Philippines) Nat Canson
- (Philippines) Olan Omiping
- (Philippines) Paul Artadi
- (Philippines) Paul Lee
- (Philippines) Paul Zamar
- (Philippines) Paulo Hubalde
- (Philippines) Philip Butel
- (Philippines) Raphy Reyes
- (Philippines) Rob Labagala
- (Philippines) Robert Jaworski
- (Philippines) Roberto Yburan
- (Philippines) Rogelio Melencio
- (Philippines) Roi Sumang
- (Philippines) Ronald Tubid
- (Philippines) Rudy Distrito
- (Philippines) Rudy Lingganay
- (Philippines) Val Acuña
- (Philippines) Xian Lim

Legend
C	Center
PG	Point Guard
PF	Power Forward
SG	Shooting Guard
SF	Small Forward

== See also ==
- University of the East
- UE Red Warriors
