= Ateneo Blue Eagles men's basketball =

Men's college basketball team in Manila, Philippines

Ateneo Blue Eagles
2026 Ateneo Blue Eagles basketball team
- University: Ateneo de Manila University
- Founded: 1914
- History: Ateneo Blue and Whites (c. 1920s–1938); Ateneo Blue Eagles (1938–present)
- Head coach: Louie Alas (interim)
- Location: Katipunan Avenue, Quezon City
- Nickname: Blue Eagles
- Colors: Blue and white

UAAP Championships (12)
- 1987; 1988; 2002; 2008; 2009; 2010; 2011; 2012; 2017; 2018; 2019; 2022

NCAA Championships (14)
- 1928; 1931; 1932; 1933; 1937; 1941; 1953; 1954; 1957; 1958; 1961; 1969; 1975; 1976

The Ateneo Blue Eagles men's basketball team represent Ateneo de Manila University in the men's collegiate basketball tournaments in the University Athletic Association of the Philippines (UAAP). They previously competed in the National Collegiate Athletic Association (NCAA) from 1924 until 1978 when they transferred to the UAAP in the same year.

== 5-on-5 basketball ==
=== Rivalry with De La Salle University ===
The school rivalry between Ateneo de Manila University and De La Salle University began when both educational institutions participated in the National Collegiate Athletic Association (NCAA) and has carried over to the University Athletic Association of the Philippines (UAAP) where both universities compete in currently.

Beginning with UAAP Season 84 in May 2022, Ateneo de Manila University decided to unify student-athletes and varsity teams under the "Blue Eagles" moniker moving forward, regardless of sport, gender, or age group. Meanwhile, the Green Archer is the traditional mascot of De La Salle University and the varsity teams are collectively referred to as the "Green Archers", however, each team carries a specific moniker that references the sport that they play.

Ateneo and La Salle were both co-founders of the NCAA in 1924, until Ateneo left the league in 1978 to join the UAAP in the same year while La Salle announced its decision to leave the NCAA in a press conference in September 1980, effective after the then ongoing 1980–81 NCAA Season. Both Catholic private schools in the Metro Manila area have been competing against each other in the UAAP ever since La Salle was also admitted to join the league in 1986.

=== Rivalry with University of the Philippines Diliman ===
The Battle of Katipunan, also known as the Katipunan derby, refers to the school rivalry between Ateneo de Manila University and the University of the Philippines Diliman (UP) began during games and meets that preceded the establishing of the National Collegiate Athletic Association (NCAA), of which both schools were founding members, and continues in the University Athletic Association of the Philippines (UAAP) where both universities compete. After competing in the NCAA for several years, UP left the NCAA to co-found the UAAP. Ateneo joined the UAAP in 1978.

As the main campuses of both schools are located along Katipunan Avenue in Quezon City, games between Ateneo and UP are referred to as the "Battle of Katipunan".

The Ateneo teams are called the Ateneo Blue Eagles and the UP teams are called the UP Fighting Maroons.

== Current roster ==
Ateneo Blue Eagles roster
Players
Coaches

Pos.	No.	Nat.	Name	Height	Year	High School
G	1	(Philippines)	Kieffer Alas	6'2" (1.88m)	1st	De La Salle Santiago Zobel School
G/F	3	(United States)	Andrew Bongo	6'4" (1.93m)	4th	Charter Oak High School
G	4	(Philippines)	Michael Asoro	6'0" (1.83m)	2nd	Sacred Heart School-Ateneo de Cebu
G/F	5	(United States)	Travis Roberts	6'6" (1.98m)	GS	Alcorn State University
G	7	(Philippines)	Ian Espinosa (C)	5'10" (1.78m)	4th	Ateneo High School
G	9	(Philippines)	Jared Bahay (C)	5'10" (1.78m)	3rd	Sacred Heart School-Ateneo de Cebu
F	10	(United States)	Shawn Tuano	6'3" (1.91m)	4th	Villanova Preparatory School
G/F	11	(United States)	Matthew De Luna	6'3" (1.91m)	3rd	West Torrance High School
F	12	(Philippines)	Jay-M Leal	6'7" (2.01m)	1st	Ateneo High School
G	13	(United States)	Grayson Rogers	6'3" (1.91m)	1st	Ritenour High School
G	17	(Philippines)	Chris Urbina	5'9" (1.75m)	1st	Ateneo High School
G/F	19	(Philippines)	Waki Espina	6'2" (1.88m)	3rd	De La Salle Santiago Zobel School
G/F	25	(Philippines)	Alden Cainglet	6'3" (1.91m)	2nd	Sacred Heart School-Ateneo de Cebu
F	30	(United States)	EJ Kapihe (C)	6'6" (1.98m)	GS	College of Wooster
F	34	(Philippines)	Sam Reyes	6'4" (1.93m)	2nd	UST High School
C	37	(Nigeria)	Sultan Baruwa	6'10" (2.08m)	1st	Topfield College, Nigeria

Head coach

- (Philippines) Louie Alas (interim)

Assistant coach(es)

- (Philippines) Sandy Arespacochaga (Lead Assistant Coach)
- (Philippines) Kerby Raymundo
- (Philippines) Bacon Austria
- (United States) Alton Lister
- (Philippines) Gene Afable
- (Philippines) RJ Jazul
- (Philippines) Ford Arao
- (Philippines) Reynaldo "Jon" Jacinto Jr.
- (Philippines) Dean Castaño

Team manager

- (Philippines) Nico Salva
- (Philippines) Debbie Tan

Legend

- (C) Team captain
- Injured

== Championships ==
=== NCAA ===
Blue Eagles
NCAA (14)	1928; 1931; 1932; 1933; 1937; 1941; 1953; 1954; 1957; 1958; 1961; 1969; 1975; 1976

=== UAAP ===
Season	Tournament	Title	Ref			
Season	Tournament	Title	Ref	1987	UAAP Season 50	Champions
1988	UAAP Season 51	Champions				
2002	UAAP Season 65	Champions				
2008	UAAP Season 71	Champions				
2009	UAAP Season 72	Champions				
2010	UAAP Season 73	Champions				
2011	UAAP Season 74	Champions				
2012	UAAP Season 75	Champions				
2017	UAAP Season 80	Champions				
2018	UAAP Season 81	Champions				
2019	UAAP Season 82	Champions				
2022	UAAP Season 85	Champions				

In men's basketball, the Ateneo Blue Eagles have won 26 titles as of 2022, 14 in the NCAA and 12 in the UAAP.

=== Other leagues and tournaments ===
The Blue Eagles also competed at the 2018 William Jones Cup, an international tournament in Taiwan for both club and national teams.

Year – Champions

- 2006 – Blue Eagles – Fr. Martin Summer Cup
- 2007 – Blue Eagles – Collegiate Champions League
- 2008 – Blue Eagles – Philippine University Games / Nike Summer League
- 2009 – Blue Eagles – Philippine University Games / Philippine Collegiate Champions League
- 2010 – Blue Eagles – Fr. Martin Summer Cup / Philippine Collegiate Champions League
- 2011 – Blue Eagles – Philippine University Games / Filoil Flying V Preseason Cup
- 2019 – Blue Eagles – Philippine Collegiate Champions League / PBA D-League
- 2020 – Blue Eagles – Philippine Collegiate Champions League
- 2022 – Blue Eagles – World University Basketball Series
- 2023 – Blue Eagles – AsiaBasket Las Piñas Championship

== Season-by-season records ==
=== NCAA ===
==== Multi-stage era (1924–1941) ====
In the early years of the NCAA, a qualifying round robin sees teams split into two groups; the top teams from each group qualify to a round robin championship round.

Season	League	Qualifying round					Championship round					
Season	League	Pos	GP	W	L	PCT	Pos	GP	W	L	PCT	Finish
1930	NCAA	2nd/5	4	3	1	.750	2nd/4	3	2	1	.667	Second place
1931	NCAA	1st/5	4	4	0	1.000	1st/3	2	2	0	1.000	Champion

==== Pennant era (1947–1977) ====
In the pennant era, a split season format was followed, where the winners of each half of the season (the pennant winners) play for the championship.

Season	League	Elimination round					Finals			
Season	League	Pos	GP	W	L	Pts	GP	W	L	Results
1975	NCAA	1st/8	14	13	1	27	Automatic champions			
1976	NCAA						2	2	0	Won Finals vs San Beda
1977	NCAA						3	1	2	Lost Finals vs San Beda

=== UAAP ===
==== Pre-Final Four era (1978–1992) ====
In the UAAP before the Final Four era, the top two teams qualify to the Finals, with the top seeded team having the twice-to-beat advantage.

Season	League	Elimination round					Finals			
Season	League	Pos	GP	W	L	Pts	GP	W	L	Results
1987	UAAP	1st/8	14	13	1	27	1	1	0	Won Finals vs UE
1988	UAAP	1st/8	14	12	2	26	1	1	0	Won Finals vs DLSU
1989	UAAP	4th/8	14	8	6	22	Did not qualify			
1990	UAAP	3rd/8	14	9	5	23	1	0	1	Lost 2nd-seed playoff vs UE
1991	UAAP	5th/8	14	6	8	20	Did not qualify			
1992	UAAP	5th/8	14	6	8	20	Did not qualify			

==== Final Four era (1993–present) ====
In the Final Four era, the top four teams qualify to the semifinals, with the top two seeded teams having the twice-to-beat advantage. The semifinal winners then advance to the best-of-three Finals.

Season	League	Elimination round					Playoffs			
Season	League	Pos	GP	W	L	PCT	GP	W	L	Results
1993	UAAP	6th/8	14	6	8	.429	Did not qualify			
1994	UAAP	6th/7	12	4	8	.333	Did not qualify			
1995	UAAP	7th/8	14	4	10	.286	Did not qualify			
1996	UAAP	5th/8	14	7	7	.500	Did not qualify			
1997	UAAP	6th/8	14	4	10	.286	Did not qualify			
1998	UAAP	6th/8	14	5	9	.357	Did not qualify			
1999	UAAP	3rd/8	14	10	4	.714	1	0	1	Lost semifinals vs UST
2000	UAAP	2nd/8	14	11	3	.786	2	0	2	Lost semifinals vs FEU
2001	UAAP	2nd/8	14	10	4	.714	4	2	2	Lost Finals vs DLSU
2002	UAAP	3rd/8	14	9	5	.643	5	4	1	Won Finals vs DLSU
2003	UAAP	1st/8	14	11	3	.786	4	1	3	Lost Finals vs FEU
2004	UAAP	3rd/8	14	10	4	.714	1	0	1	Lost semifinals vs DLSU
2005	UAAP	3rd/8	14	10	4	.714	1	0	1	Lost semifinals vs DLSU
2006	UAAP	1st/7	12	10	2	.833	4	2	2	Lost Finals vs UST
2007	UAAP	3rd/8	14	9	5	.643	3	2	1	Lost stepladder round 2 vs DLSU
2008	UAAP	1st/8	14	13	1	.929	3	3	0	Won Finals vs DLSU
2009	UAAP	1st/8	14	13	1	.929	4	3	1	Won Finals vs UE
2010	UAAP	2nd/8	14	10	4	.714	3	3	0	Won Finals vs FEU
2011	UAAP	1st/8	14	13	1	.929	3	3	0	Won Finals vs FEU
2012	UAAP	1st/8	14	12	2	.857	3	3	0	Won Finals vs UST
2013	UAAP	5th/8	14	7	7	.500	Did not qualify			
2014	UAAP	1st/8	14	11	3	.786	2	0	2	Lost semifinals vs NU
2015	UAAP	3rd/8	14	9	5	.643	1	0	1	Lost semifinals vs FEU
2016	UAAP	2nd/8	14	10	4	.714	4	1	3	Lost Finals vs DLSU
2017	UAAP	1st/8	14	13	1	.929	5	3	2	Won Finals vs DLSU
2018	UAAP	1st/8	14	12	2	.857	3	3	0	Won Finals vs UP
2019	UAAP	1st/8	14	14	0	1.000	2	2	0	Won Finals vs UST
2022 (S84)	UAAP	1st/8	14	13	1	.929	4	2	2	Lost Finals vs UP
2022 (S85)	UAAP	1st/8	14	11	3	.786	4	3	1	Won Finals vs UP
2023	UAAP	4th/8	14	7	7	.500	1	0	1	Lost semifinals vs UP
2024	UAAP	8th/8	14	4	10	.286	Did not qualify			
2025	UAAP	6th/8	14	6	8	.429	Did not qualify			
2026	UAAP	TBD/8	13	5	8	.385	Did not qualify			

=== Notable players ===
- Gene Afable
- Japeth Aguilar
- Rich Alvarez
- Rabeh Al-Hussaini
- Ford Arao
- Francis Arnaiz
- Anton Asistio
- Nonoy Baclao
- SJ Belangel
- Aaron Black
- Ryan Buenafe
- Paolo Bugia
- Bernardo Carpio
- Gec Chia
- Justin Chua
- Ricardo Cleofas
- Baby Dalupan
- Arthur dela Cruz
- Paquito Diaz
- Nico Elorde
- John Paul Erram
- Macky Escalona
- Yuri Escueta
- Larry Fonacier
- Fritz Gaston
- Jayvee Gayoso
- Isaac Go
- Frank Golla
- Wesley Gonzales
- Alfonzo Gotladera
- Vince Hizon
- JC Intal
- Padim Israel
- Robert Jaworski Jr.
- Angelo Kouame
- Doug Kramer
- Jojo Lastimosa
- Kirk Long
- Moro Lorenzo
- Gian Mamuyac
- Honesto Mayoralgo
- Magnum Membrere
- Emman Monfort
- LA Mumar
- Chito Narvasa
- Ogie Narvasa
- Chris Newsome
- Ed Ocampo
- Ambrosio Padilla
- Von Pessumal
- Kris Porter
- Francisco Rabat
- Olsen Racela
- Dwight Ramos
- Ning Ramos
- Kiefer Ravena
- Thirdy Ravena
- Chot Reyes
- Eric Reyes
- Jai Reyes
- Gilbert "Jun" Reyes
- Jun Ross
- Nico Salva
- Marte Samson
- Greg Slaughter
- LA Tenorio
- Richie Ticzon
- Tyler Tio
- Juami Tiongson
- Chris Tiu
- Arvin Tolentino
- Enrico Villanueva
- Adrian Wong

== Head coaches ==
- Fr. John Hurley S.J.
- Fr. James Martin S.J.
- Fr. Matthew Kane S.J.
- Fr. Joseph Geib S.J.
- Fr. Denis Lynch S.J.
- 1960–1965: Al Dunbar
- 1969: Nilo Verona
- 1972–1976: Baby Dalupan
- 1977: Adriano Go
- 1978: Dodie Agcaoli
- 1982: Chito Narvasa
- 1985-1986: Chito Afable
- 1987: Cris Calilan
- 1988: Fritz Gaston
- 1989: Ogie Narvasa
- 1990–1992: Chot Reyes
- 1993: Baby Dalupan
- 1994: Cris Calilan
- 1995: Mark Molina
- 1996: Ricky Palou
- 1997: Perry Ronquillo
- 1997–1998: Mark Molina
- 1999–2001: Joe Lipa
- 2002–2003: Joel Banal
- 2004: Sandy Arespacochaga
- 2005–2012: Norman Black
- 2013–2015: Bo Perasol
- 2015–2016: Sandy Arespacochaga
- 2016–2026: Tab Baldwin
- 2026–present: Louie Alas (interim)

== Uniform ==
=== Manufacturer ===
- 1988: Adidas
- 1996: Reebok
- 1997: Nike
- 2000–2001: Guess
- 2002: Nike
- 2003–2009: Adidas
- 2010–present: Nike
  - 2022–present: Jordan Brand

== 3x3 basketball ==
Ateneo won the UAAP Season 81 3x3 basketball tournament on its second and final year as a demonstration sport before it became an official sport in UAAP Season 82.

== Individual awards ==
=== Most Valuable Player (Season) ===
Season	Tournament	Player
1987	UAAP Season 50	Jun Reyes
1988	UAAP Season 51	Jun Reyes
2000	UAAP Season 63	Rich Alvarez
2001	UAAP Season 64	Rich Alvarez
2002	UAAP Season 65	Enrico Villanueva
2008	UAAP Season 71	Rabeh Al-Hussaini
2014	UAAP Season 77	Kiefer Ravena
2015	UAAP Season 78	Kiefer Ravena
2021	UAAP Season 84	Ange Kouame

=== Most Valuable Player (Finals) ===
Season	Tournament	Player/s
2002	UAAP Season 65	Larry Fonacier; Wesley Gonzales
2008	UAAP Season 71	Nonoy Baclao
2009	UAAP Season 72	Rabeh Al-Hussaini
2010	UAAP Season 73	Ryan Buenafe
2011	UAAP Season 74	Nico Salva
2012	UAAP Season 75	Nico Salva
2017	UAAP Season 80	Thirdy Ravena
2018	UAAP Season 81	Thirdy Ravena
2019	UAAP Season 82	Thirdy Ravena
2022	UAAP Season 85	Ange Kouame

=== Rookie of the Year ===
Season	Tournament	Player
1998	UAAP Season 61	Enrico Villanueva
2005	UAAP Season 68	Jai Reyes
2008	UAAP Season 71	Ryan Buenafe
2011	UAAP Season 74	Kiefer Ravena
2014	UAAP Season 77	Arvin Tolentino
2018	UAAP Season 81	Ange Kouame

=== Mythical Team ===
Season	Tournament	Player/s
2000	UAAP Season 63	Rich Alvarez
2001	UAAP Season 64	Rich Alvarez
2002	UAAP Season 65	Rich Alvarez
2002	UAAP Season 65	Rich Alvarez; Enrico Villanueva
2003	UAAP Season 66	Rich Alvarez
2004	UAAP Season 67	LA Tenorio
2005	UAAP Season 68	LA Tenorio
2006	UAAP Season 69	JC Intal
2007	UAAP Season 70	Chris Tiu
2008	UAAP Season 71	Chris Tiu; Rabeh Al-Hussaini
2009	UAAP Season 72	Rabeh Al-Hussaini
2011	UAAP Season 74	Kiefer Ravena; Greg Slaughter
2012	UAAP Season 75	Greg Slaughter
2014	UAAP Season 77	Kiefer Ravena; Chris Newsome
2015	UAAP Season 78	Kiefer Ravena
2016	UAAP Season 79	Thirdy Ravena
2017	UAAP Season 80	Thirdy Ravena
2021	UAAP Season 84	Ange Kouame
2022	UAAP Season 85	Dave Ildefonso; Forthsky Padrigao
