= UAAP Season 68 men's basketball tournament =

Basketball competition in the Philippines

UAAP Season 68
- Host school: Adamson University
Men's Finals	G1	G2	Wins
FEU Tamaraws	75	73	2
De La Salle Green Archers	73	71	0
- Duration: September 29 to October 6
- Arena(s): Araneta Coliseum
- Finals MVP: Arwind Santos
- Winning coach: Bert Flores
- Semifinalists: Ateneo Blue Eagles; UE Red Warriors
- TV network(s): Studio 23 and TFC

The UAAP Season 68 men's basketball tournament is the men's basketball tournament of A.Y. 2005–06 season of the University Athletic Association of the Philippines (UAAP). The tournament was hosted by Adamson University. ABS-CBN covered the games on Studio 23.

At the end of the elimination round, the FEU Tamaraws finished on top of the team standings; the defending champions De La Salle Green Archers was tied with the Ateneo Blue Eagles and the UE Red Warriors for second. By virtue of a better point differential from games among the three teams, La Salle clinched the second seed; Ateneo and UE played for the #3 seed, a game Ateneo won. FEU and La Salle won convincingly against Ateneo and UE respectively in the semifinals to set up a rematch of the previous year's finals series. In the finals, the FEU Tamaraws defeated De La Salle Green Archers in two close games (both games were decided in the final minute) to win the championship.

FEU Tamaraw Arwind Santos was named season and finals Most Valuable Player.

At the end of the tournament, La Salle returned their 2005 runner-up and 2004 championship trophies to the league after it was revealed they fielded two ineligible players. The league decided to suspend La Salle for the succeeding season in both divisions for all events, and the 2004 championship trophy was awarded to FEU.

== Coaches ==
=== Current coaches ===
- Adamson Soaring Falcons – Mel Alas
- Ateneo Blue Eagles – Norman Black
- De La Salle Green Archers – Franz Pumaren
- FEU Tamaraws – Bert Flores
- NU Bulldogs – Manny Dandan
- UE Red Warriors – Dindo Pumaren
- UP Fighting Maroons – Lito Vergara
- UST Growling Tigers – Nel Parado

=== Coaching changes ===
Team	Outgoing coach	Replaced by
Adamson Soaring Falcons	Luigi Trillo	Mel Alas
Ateneo Blue Eagles	Sandy Arespacochaga	Norman Black
FEU Tamaraws	Koy Banal	Bert Flores
NU Bulldogs	Rico Perez	Manny Dandan

== Elimination round ==
Pos	Team	W	L	PCT	GB	Qualification
1	FEU Tamaraws	12	2	.857	—	Twice-to-beat in the semifinals
2	De La Salle Green Archers (Note: This "final" team standings is overturned when La Salle forfeited their games after the season was over. See Suspension of De La Salle University for details.)	10	4	.714 (Note: Head-to-head record: La Salle 3–1, Ateneo 2–2, UE 1–3; third-seed playoff: Ateneo 76–65 UE)	2	Twice-to-beat in the semifinals
3	Ateneo Blue Eagles	10	4	.714	2	Twice-to-win in the semifinals
4	UE Red Warriors	10	4	.714	2	Twice-to-win in the semifinals
5	UP Fighting Maroons	6	8	.429	6	
6	UST Growling Tigers	4	10	.286	8	
7	Adamson Falcons (H)	3	11	.214	9	
8	NU Bulldogs	1	13	.071	11	

Source: UBelt.com
(H) Hosts

=== Match-up results ===
	Round 1							Round 2						
Team ╲ Game	1	2	3	4	5	6	7	8	9	10	11	12	13	14
Adamson	NU school colors	FEU school colors	UST school colors	La Salle school colors	UE school colors	UP school colors	Ateneo school colors	UE school colors	Ateneo school colors	NU school colors	UST school colors	UP school colors	FEU school colors	La Salle school colors
Ateneo	La Salle school colors	UST school colors	FEU school colors	NU school colors	UP school colors	UE school colors	Adamson school colors	Adamson school colors	UP school colors	UE school colors	UST school colors	NU school colors	FEU school colors	La Salle school colors
La Salle	Ateneo school colors	UP school colors	UE school colors	Adamson school colors	UST school colors	FEU school colors	NU school colors	UST school colors	FEU school colors	NU school colors	UP school colors	Adamson school colors	Ateneo school colors	UE school colors
FEU	UE school colors	Adamson school colors	Ateneo school colors	UST school colors	NU school colors	La Salle school colors	UP school colors	UE school colors	La Salle school colors	UP school colors	Adamson school colors	UST school colors	Ateneo school colors	NU school colors
NU	Adamson school colors	UE school colors	UP school colors	Ateneo school colors	FEU school colors	UST school colors	La Salle school colors	UP school colors	Adamson school colors	La Salle school colors	UE school colors	Ateneo school colors	UST school colors	FEU school colors
UE	FEU school colors	NU school colors	La Salle school colors	UP school colors	Adamson school colors	Ateneo school colors	UST school colors	FEU school colors	Adamson school colors	UST school colors	Ateneo school colors	NU school colors	UP school colors	La Salle school colors
UP	UST school colors	La Salle school colors	NU school colors	UE school colors	Ateneo school colors	Adamson school colors	FEU school colors	UST school colors	NU school colors	Ateneo school colors	FEU school colors	Adamson school colors	La Salle school colors	UE school colors
UST	UP school colors	Ateneo school colors	Adamson school colors	FEU school colors	La Salle school colors	NU school colors	UE school colors	UP school colors	La Salle school colors	UE school colors	Adamson school colors	Ateneo school colors	FEU school colors	NU school colors

= Win; = OT win; = Loss; = OT loss

=== Scores ===
Results on top and to the right of the dashes are for first-round games; those to the bottom and to the left of it are second-round games.

Teams	AdU	AdMU	DLSU	FEU	NU	UE	UP	UST
Adamson Soaring Falcons	—	75–91	58–65	51–68	116–103	69–90	61–77	83–68
Ateneo Blue Eagles	71–58	—	60–78	54–65	83–51	65–63	71–63	79–72
De La Salle Green Archers	100–70	72–55	—	62–69	91–70	56–57	56–61	98–78
FEU Tamaraws	66–56	60–69	70–69	—	83–68	82–66	75–67	76–51
NU Bulldogs	67–93	65–70	54–78	43–76	—	64–71	59–81	100–107
UE Red Warriors	78–57	69–75	67–79 (Note: Game originally played on September 1 with La Salle winning over UE 86-83 in overtime, however, the UAAP Board nullified the game and called for a replay on September 18 after it upheld UE's protest against a timeout given to La Salle in the final 1.8 seconds of the game.)	62–57	68–50	—	57–51	84–68
UP Fighting Maroons	70–63	57–67	45–59	63–71	72–67	61–65	—	69–66
UST Growling Tigers	65–62	77–73	72–98	63–64	73–74	53–66	92–85*	—

Source: Philippine Daily Inquirer
Legend: Blue = left column team win; Red = top row team win.
Matches with lighter background shading were decided after overtime.

== Third seed playoff ==
Since La Salle, Ateneo and UE finished the eliminations with identical 10-4 cards, the quotient system was used. La Salle emerged with the best quotient among the three, so UE and Ateneo figured for a one-game playoff for the third seed. The winner will face the second seed, while the loser will face the first seed. The top two seeded teams possess the twice-to-beat advantage.

Studio 23

September 22
4:00 p.m.

Ateneo Blue Eagles	76–65	UE Red Warriors
Scoring by quarter: 21–19, 20–13, 18–23, 17–10
Pts: JC Intal 21		Pts: Bonbon Custodio 17

Araneta Coliseum, Quezon City

== Bracket ==
Semifinals (Top 2 twice-to-beat)
1	FEU	78
4	UE	57
2	La Salle	74
3	Ateneo	57

Finals (Best-of-three playoff)
1	FEU	75	73
2	La Salle	73	71

== Semifinals ==
Both FEU and La Salle only has to win once in the series, while their opponents have to win twice to qualify for the Finals.

=== (1) FEU vs. (4) UE ===
Studio 23

September 25
4:00 p.m.

FEU Tamaraws	78–57	UE Red Warriors
Scoring by quarter: 15–14, 24–14, 24–11, 15–18
Pts: Fernandez, Barcellano 12 each		Pts: Mark Borboran 11
FEU wins series in one game

Araneta Coliseum, Quezon City

First seed FEU Tamaraws eliminated the UE Red Warriors 78–57. FEU coach Bert Flores remarked that one of the reasons why Arwind Santos skipped the 2005 PBA Draft was to win the championship for the year after losing last year's championship series.

=== (2) La Salle vs. (3) Ateneo ===
Studio 23

September 25
1:30 p.m.

De La Salle Green Archers	74–57	Ateneo Blue Eagles
Scoring by quarter: 11–10, 11–15, 28–11, 24–21
Pts: Joseph Yeo 28; Rebs: Junjun Cabatu 13; Asts: Junjun Cabatu 3		Pts: LA Tenorio 20; Rebs: LA Tenorio 6 each Asts: Intal, Tenorio 3 each
La Salle wins series in one game

Araneta Coliseum, Quezon City

With La Salle routing Ateneo in their two elimination round games, Ateneo's LA Tenorio led the Eagles in the first half, with the Eagles leading by three points at halftime. Tenorio will finish the game with a team-high 20 points, along with six rebounds, three assists and four steals. La Salle's go-to guy Joseph Yeo scored 23 of his 28 points in the second half to blow the game wide open; he led the 11–0 run at the third quarter to erase Ateneo's three-point halftime lead to a 43–31 La Salle lead. Ateneo will not catch up, and La Salle qualifies for the finals with a 74–57 victory.

== Finals ==
The Finals is a best-of-three series; the team that wins twice wins the championship.

=== Game 1 ===
Studio 23

September 29
3:30 p.m.

FEU Tamaraws	75–73	De La Salle Green Archers
Scoring by quarter: 17–28, 25–15, 17–16, 16–14
Pts: Arwind Santos 29; Rebs: Arwind Santos 14; Asts: Jonas Villanueva 3		Pts: Joseph Yeo 26; Rebs: Ryan Araña 6 Asts: Joseph Yeo 6
FEU leads series 1–0

Araneta Coliseum, Quezon City

La Salle led for much of the first half, leading 43–29. Arwind Santos led a 13–0 run to trim the lead by one point at halftime. FEU led for the third quarter, but La Salle cut the gap to one point at the end of that quarter. La Salle continued their run at the fourth quarter, capped off by Joseph Yeo who gave the lead to La Salle 73–70 with 1:37 left in the game. Later, Santos made a three-pointer to tie the game at 73–all with 48.6 seconds left. With La Salle failing to score on their possession, Santos scored on a put-back with 5.5 seconds remaining. JV Casio missed a three-pointer at the other end, and Rico Maierhofer missed the put-back to clinch FEU's game 1 victory. Yeo finished with 26 points, while Santos had a double-double of 29 points and 14 rebounds. At the end of the game, La Salle assistant team manager Manny Salgado rushed to the court and hit Santos at the back of the head. The act was seen on national television.

FEU coach Bert Flores had to be restrained as he tried to go after Salgado who had run for safety. Salgado later said that while Santos and Yeo were exchanging words, he tried to pacify them but Santos uttered some foul words. Salgado lost his temper and threw a closed fist at the back of Santos' head. Salgado later issued an apology as La Salle condemned the act and will accept the decision of the UAAP Board. Subsequently, the UAAP Board unanimously banned Salgado for life at all UAAP events, the stiffest penalty on a team official.

=== Game 2 ===
Studio 23

October 6
3:30 p.m.

FEU Tamaraws	73–71	De La Salle Green Archers
Scoring by quarter: 21–13, 19–25, 17–24, 16–9
Pts: Arwind Santos 14; Rebs: Arwind Santos 13; Asts: Jonas Villanueva 6		Pts: Ryan Araña 20; Rebs: Ryan Araña 11; Asts: TY Tang 8
FEU wins series 2–0

Araneta Coliseum, Quezon City

- Finals Most Valuable Player: Arwind Santos (FEU Tamaraws)

The Tamaraws led at the end of first quarter by eight points, but La Salle cut the lead to two by halftime. In the third quarter, Ryan Araña scored three three-pointers to put La Salle up by 11. The Tamaraws cut the lead to three early in the fourth quarter, capped off by Jeff Chan's three-point play. La Salle would still lead up to the final minute when Yeo fouled Mark Isip, who converted the three-point play to put FEU up 72–71. La Salle failed to score on their next possession, and they fouled Jonas Villanueva, who split his free-throws to end the game. Santos was named Finals MVP after having another double-double performance with 14 points, 13 rebounds and three blocks.

== Awards ==
UAAP Season 68 men's basketball champions
FEU Tamaraws
19th title, third consecutive title

- Most Valuable Player: Arwind Santos (FEU Tamaraws)
- Rookie of the Year: Jai Reyes (Ateneo Blue Eagles)
- Mythical Five:
  - Arwind Santos (FEU Tamaraws)
  - Mark Isip (FEU Tamaraws)
  - Joseph Yeo (De La Salle Green Archers)
  - LA Tenorio (Ateneo Blue Eagles)
  - Edwin Asoro (NU Bulldogs)
- Defensive Player of the Year: Arwind Santos (FEU Tamaraws)

== La Salle's suspension ==
On August 15, La Salle had received reports that the papers of their men's basketball players Mark Benitez and Tim Gatchalian were spurious. However, they took no action until a month later when the allegations were made public. At the end of the finals series, La Salle voluntarily gave up the 2004 championship trophy and the 2005 runner-up trophy to the league. The league, on April 22, 2006, suspended La Salle for the following season in all sports and in both Seniors and Juniors divisions for negligence, "as La Salle violated existing UAAP rules and regulations when it submitted the documents of Mark Benitez and Tim Gatchalian during the 2003-2004 season which proved to be spurious."

== Broadcast notes ==
Game	Play-by-play	Analyst	Courtside reporters
Game 1	Boom Gonzales	TJ Manotoc	Yvette Gavieres and Micky Deles
Game 2	Sev Sarmenta	Alex Compton	Yvette Gavieres and Micky Deles

== See also ==
- NCAA Season 81 basketball tournaments

Preceded by Season 67 (2004)	UAAP men's basketball seasons Season 68 (2005) basketball	Succeeded by Season 69 (2006)
