= LA Tenorio =

Filipino basketball player and coach (born 1984)

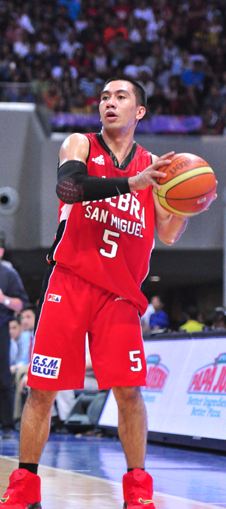
- Tenorio with the Barangay Ginebra San Miguel in 2014

No. 5 – Magnolia Chicken Timplados Hotshots
- Position: Point guard / head coach
- League: PBA

Personal information
- Born: July 9, 1984 (age 42) Nasugbu, Batangas, Philippines
- Listed height: 5 ft 9 in (1.75 m)
- Listed weight: 152 lb (69 kg)

Career information
- High school: San Beda (Manila)
- College: Ateneo
- PBA draft: 2006: 1st round, 4th overall pick
- Drafted by: San Miguel Beermen
- Playing career: 2006–present
- Coaching career: 2019–present

Career history

Playing
- 2006–2008: San Miguel Beermen/Magnolia Beverage Masters
- 2008–2012: Alaska Aces
- 2012–2025: Barangay Ginebra San Miguel
- 2025–present: Magnolia Chicken Timplados Hotshots

Coaching
- 2019–2022: Letran (assistant)
- 2023, 2025: Barangay Ginebra San Miguel (assistant)
- 2023: Philippines (assistant)
- 2025: Philippines U-17
- 2025–present: Magnolia Chicken Timplados Hotshots

Career highlights
- As player: 8× PBA champion (2010 Fiesta, 2016 Governors', 2017 Governors', 2018 Commissioner's, 2019 Governors', 2020 Philippine, 2021 Governors', 2022–23 Commissioner's); 4× PBA Finals MVP (2010 Fiesta, 2016 Governors', 2017 Governors', 2020 Philippine); PBA Best Player of the Conference (2013 Commissioner's); 10× PBA All-Star (2009, 2011–2015, 2017–2019, 2023); 2× PBA Mythical First Team (2010, 2013); 2× PBA Mythical Second Team (2016, 2017); PBA All-Rookie Team (2007); PBA Comeback Player of the Year (2024); 2× PBA Order of Merit (2013, 2017); PBA Most Improved Player (2010); UAAP champion (2002); 2× UAAP Mythical Team (2004, 2005); William Jones Cup MVP (2012); PBL champion (2006 Unity); PBL Finals MVP (2006 Unity); PBL Mythical Second Team (2005 Unity); As assistant coach: 2× NCAA champion (2019, 2022)
Medals
Men's basketball
Philippines
FIBA Asia Championship
Silver medal – second place	2013 Manila	Team
FIBA Asia Cup
Bronze medal – third place	2014 Wuhan	Team
SEABA Cup
Gold medal – first place	2012 Chiang Mai	Team
SEA Games
Gold medal – first place	2019 Philippines	Team
William Jones Cup
Gold medal – first place	2012 Taipei	Team
Assistant coach for Philippines
Asian Games
Gold medal – first place	2022 Hangzhou	Team

Lewis Alfred Vasquez Tenorio (born July 9, 1984) is a Filipino professional basketball player and head coach for the Magnolia Chicken Timplados Hotshots of the Philippine Basketball Association (PBA) and the Gilas Youth. He was an assistant coach for the Letran Knights of the Philippines' NCAA.

Tenorio played for the Ateneo Blue Eagles in college, winning a UAAP title in Season 65 (2002). In 2006, he was selected by the San Miguel Beermen with the fourth pick of the 2006 PBA draft. He then was selected to the All-Rookie Team.

In 2008, Tenorio was traded to the Alaska Aces, where he earned his first all-star selection in 2009, as well as his first title, Finals MVP, and Mythical Team selection in 2010. He also won the Most Improved Player that year.

In 2012, Tenorio was traded to the Barangay Ginebra San Miguel where he had his most successful stint in the league, winning seven titles and three Finals MVPs. He also holds the record for most consecutive PBA games played at 744 before suffering a groin injury in March 2023. Later that month, he was also diagnosed with stage 3 colon cancer. After being cleared in September, he then returned to playing in December. After thirteen years of play with Ginebra, Tenorio was appointed as head coach of the Magnolia Chicken Timplados Hotshots in 2025.

During his nineteen-year PBA playing career, Tenorio won a total of eight titles, four Finals MVPs, ten all-star selections, and four Mythical Team selections.

== Early life ==
Tenorio started playing basketball when he was 6 years old. No one really saw him play or his potential, but he tried his luck to join a basketball team when he was in grade three at Don Bosco Technical Institute of Makati. He, then in sixth grade, played a nationally televised exhibition game in front of a PBA audience. His team faced the Ateneo Grade School's Small Basketeers Team. Tenorio's team did not win, but he pretty much stole the show, scoring 31 points in only 21 minutes of play.

After his elementary days were over, he first went to Adamson under coach Charlie Dy before eventually transferring to San Beda under legendary bench tactician Ato Badolato. LA became part of a Bedan squad that was rife with future collegiate stars – Magnum Membrere, Arjun Cordero, Toti Almeda, and Jon Jon Tabique. He won a title in his junior year, but finished just third in his last year with the Red Cubs.

== College and amateur career ==
Tenorio made an immediate impact as a rookie for the Blue Eagles of Ateneo de Manila University as he helped lead his team into the 2001 basketball finals of the University Athletic Association of the Philippines (UAAP). He was practically unstoppable in game 3 of the best-of-3 finals series as he scored 30 points against their college rival De La Salle Green Archers. DLSU-Manila however would go on to win that series.

The following year, in 2002, he would once again lead the Ateneo de Manila back to the UAAP finals. This time he and his team would not be denied as they exacted vengeance on DLSU-Manila to win the UAAP Men's Seniors basketball championship.

He would make a third straight finals appearance in 2003 but he and his Blue Eagle team would yield their crown to the veteran Far Eastern University Tamaraws.

He played a total of five seasons with Ateneo de Manila and also graduated with a Bachelor of Arts degree in 2006. He played under four college coaches: Joe Lipa, Joel Banal, Sandy Arespacochaga and Norman Black.

After completing his collegiate eligibility he then saw action in the quasi-commercial basketball league of the Philippines, the Philippine Basketball League (PBL) the last stepping stone towards achieving a professional basketball career. In his last PBL Conference he led his Harbour Centre Portmasters team to the 2006 PBL Unity Cup championship, a fitting end to his career as an amateur player.

== PBA career ==
During the 2006 PBA draft, Tenorio was the fourth overall draft pick by the San Miguel Beermen. He played an average of 25.5 minutes for Magnolia with a respectable average of 7.8 points, 4.6 assists and 3.6 rebounds in nine games.

In March 2008, he and Larry Fonacier were traded to the Alaska Aces in exchange for Mike Cortez and Ken Bono. The Aces benefited from acquiring Tenorio, a dedicated point guard, allowing Willie Miller to focus on scoring.

In the first four games of the 2009–10 PBA Philippine Cup, Tenorio met Alaska's expectations. As starting point guard, he led the team to a narrow victory over San Miguel Beer in the opening game and continued to perform reliably in the next three games, helping Alaska reach the top of the standings.

On August 31, 2012, Tenorio was traded to Barangay Ginebra San Miguel in a six-player blockbuster deal. Tenorio was also famous because of his "Pambansang reverse" which is a reverse lay up made him famous in international basketball.

On October 14, 2016, Tenorio was recognized during the PBA Leo Awards Night as he was named to the PBA Mythical Second Team. On October 19, 2016, Tenorio was named as the 2016 PBA Governors' Cup finals Most Valuable Player after averaging 17.2 points, 4.7 assists and 3.8 rebounds against the Meralco Bolts.

On June 12, 2022, Tenorio played in his 700th consecutive game, the most consecutive games played for a PBA player. On December 10, 2022, he made his 1,178th three points field goals made and tied James Yap for third most all time. On March 1, 2023, Tenorio's consecutive games played ended at 744 due to a groin injury.

On September 6, 2025, Tenorio formally announced his retirement as a player. But on December 20, 2025, Tenorio was activated as a playing coach due to the injury of Paul Lee.

== PBA career statistics ==
Legend
GP	Games played	MPG	Minutes per game	FG%	Field-goal percentage
3FG%	3-point field-goal percentage	4P%	4-point field-goal percentage	FT%	Free-throw percentage
RPG	Rebounds per game	APG	Assists per game	SPG	Steals per game
BPG	Blocks per game	PPG	Points per game	127	Career high

As of the end of 2025–26 season

=== Season-by-season averages ===
Year	Team	GP	MPG	FG%	3P%	4P%	FT%	RPG	APG	SPG	BPG	PPG
2006–07	San Miguel	62	22.3	.363	.297	—	.824	2.5	3.1	1.0	—	8.2
2007–08	Magnolia	39	28.4	.405	.338	—	.701	3.6	4.5	1.2	.1	8.6
2007–08	Alaska	39	28.4	.405	.338	—	.701	3.6	4.5	1.2	.1	8.6
2008–09	Alaska	47	33.3	.712	.312	—	.785	4.2	4.7	1.1	.0	11.0
2009–10	Alaska	62	35.3	.399	.337	—	.844	4.6	4.6	1.2	.0	12.8
2010–11	Alaska	42	35.5	.394	.378	—	.833	4.8	4.5	1.3	.1	13.5
2011–12	Alaska	35	36.1	.373	.246	—	.800	5.4	5.4	1.2	.1	14.0
2012–13	Barangay Ginebra	52	36.0	.364	.297	—	.753	5.0	5.8	1.5	.1	14.0
2013–14	Barangay Ginebra	43	32.8	.376	.275	—	.830	4.3	5.5	1.3	.1	11.2
2014–15	Barangay Ginebra	37	29.2	.382	.333	—	.793	4.3	3.9	1.5	—	9.9
2015–16	Barangay Ginebra	49	33.7	.433	.387	—	.804	4.1	4.5	1.2	.1	13.0
2016–17	Barangay Ginebra	64	34.3	.403	.370	—	.780	3.5	4.7	1.3	.0	14.2
2017–18	Barangay Ginebra	57	35.9	.372	.335	—	.837	3.5	4.6	1.6	.1	12.5
2019	Barangay Ginebra	52	35.4	.387	.361	—	.863	3.3	4.6	1.2	.0	11.8
2020	Barangay Ginebra	22	31.3	.423	.400	—	.750	2.9	4.6	.8	.1	9.6
2021	Barangay Ginebra	36	37.8	.405	.338	—	.853	3.3	5.0	.5	.1	12.7
2022–23	Barangay Ginebra	45	26.8	.338	.313	—	.739	2.0	3.6	.8	.0	7.8
2023–24	Barangay Ginebra	30	14.2	.340	.391	—	.600	1.7	1.6	.4	—	2.9
2024–25	Barangay Ginebra	25	8.4	.443	.455	.400	.800	.6	.6	.3	—	2.9
2025–26	Magnolia	2	11.2	.333	.400	—	1.000	1.5	3.0	—	—	3.5
Career		801	31.2	.398	.334	.400	.800	3.6	4.3	1.1	.1	11.1

== National team career ==
Tenorio made his name on the final list of the Smart Gilas 2.0 roster. The first tournament of the Gilas were the prestigious 2012 William Jones Cup which was held from August 18–26 in Taipei. Gilas had an impressive 6–1 record, before battling out the USA Team for their last game. Tenorio led the team to beat the USA team 76–75, finishing with 20 points and grabbing the most important rebound of the game. Gilas won the tournament with a 7–1 record, and the 4th championship of the Philippines in the Jones Cup. Tenorio eventually became the tournament's Most Valuable Player after his last performance against the tough USA Team.

== Coaching career ==
While playing for Ginebra, Tenorio joined Bonnie Tan's coaching staff at the Letran Knights starting in NCAA Season 95 (2019). Tenorio coached Letran for four years, then was a part of the coaching staff of the Philippine national team for the 2022 Asian Games under Tim Cone.

Tenorio was appointed by the Samahang Basketbol ng Pilipinas as the head coach of the Philippines men's youth teams in November 2024.

== Personal life ==
Tenorio is married to Chesca Bugia, sister of his former Ateneo teammate Paolo Bugia.

On March 21, 2023, Tenorio announced that he was diagnosed with stage 3 colon cancer. He was declared cancer-free in September 2023.
