= UAAP Season 67 men's basketball tournament =

Basketball competition in the Philippines

UAAP Season 67
- Host school: De La Salle University
Men's Finals	G1	G2	G3	Wins
FEU Tamaraws	~~51~~	67	~~65~~	(Note: La Salle originally won the series 2–1. A year later, it was revealed that they unknowingly fielded two ineligible players for the past three seasons (Seasons 66 to 68). They originally offered to return the Season 67 championship trophy and the Season 68 runner-up trophy. The UAAP Board later stripped them of the Season 67 title and Season 68 runner-up finish, forfeited all their wins from Season 66 to 68, awarded the Season 67 championship to FEU, and suspended them in Season 69.)
~~De La Salle Green Archers~~	~~58~~	57	~~68~~
- Duration: September 23 to 30
- Arena(s): Araneta Coliseum
- Finals MVP: Mark Cardona
- Winning coach: Franz Pumaren
- Semifinalists: Ateneo Blue Eagles; UE Red Warriors
- TV network(s): Studio 23 and TFC

The men's basketball tournament of UAAP Season 67 (2004–05 season) of the University Athletic Association of the Philippines (UAAP) was hosted by De La Salle University. ABS-CBN covered the games on Studio 23.

Defending champions FEU Tamaraws finished first after the elimination round clinching the twice-to-beat advantage; a game behind was last season's finalist Ateneo Blue Eagles and archrival De La Salle Green Archers, and a further two games behind are the UE Red Warriors. La Salle defeated Ateneo on the playoff for the second seed, hence clinching the twice-to-beat advantage. In the semifinals, both top seeded teams eliminated their opponents. The heavily favored Tamaraws were dealt with a shock loss by La Salle in the first game of the finals, but they rebounded on the second game to extend the series into a deciding third game. In a game that had plenty of lead changes in the final two minutes, La Salle's JV Casio converted a three-point shot to put La Salle up for good to win the championship. Mark Cardona was named finals Most Valuable Player (MVP).

FEU's Arwind Santos was named the season MVP, and Marcy Arellano was awarded the Rookie of the Year honors.

La Salle would return the 2004 championship and the 2005 runner-up trophies in 2005 after it was revealed that two of their players used spurious records to enroll at the school; since the players are not eligible to be college students, they were ineligible to play as varsity players. The league later suspended all of La Salle's teams in both divisions for the 2006 season, forfeited all of La Salle's wins from 2003 to 2005, and gave the 2004 championship trophy to FEU, the defeated finalists. This gave FEU three consecutive championships from 2003 to 2005. La Salle's varsity teams would return for the 2007–08 season.

== Coaches ==
=== Current coaches ===
- Adamson Soaring Falcons – Luigi Trillo
- Ateneo Blue Eagles – Sandy Arespacochaga
- De La Salle Green Archers – Franz Pumaren
- FEU Tamaraws – Koy Banal
- NU Bulldogs – Rico Perez
- UE Red Warriors – Dindo Pumaren
- UP Fighting Maroons – Lito Vergara
- UST Growling Tigers – Nel Parado

=== Coaching changes ===
Team	Outgoing coach	Replaced by
Ateneo Blue Eagles	Joel Banal	Sandy Arespacochaga
UE Red Warriors	Boyzie Zamar	Dindo Pumaren
UST Growling Tigers	Aric del Rosario	Nel Parado

== Elimination round ==
Pos	Team	W	L	PCT	GB	Qualification
1	FEU Tamaraws	11	3	.786	—	Twice-to-beat in the semifinals
2	De La Salle Green Archers (Note: This "final" team standings is overturned when La Salle forfeited their games after the season was over. See La Salle forfeiture of the championship for details.) (H)	10	4	.714 (Note: Second-seed playoff: La Salle 82–69 Ateneo)	1	Twice-to-beat in the semifinals
3	Ateneo Blue Eagles	10	4	.714	1	Twice-to-win in the semifinals
4	UE Red Warriors	8	6	.571	3	Twice-to-win in the semifinals
5	UP Fighting Maroons	7	7	.500	4	
6	Adamson Falcons	5	9	.357	6	
7	UST Growling Tigers	4	10	.286	7	
8	NU Bulldogs	1	13	.071	10	

Source: UBelt.com
Rules for classification: 1) winning percentage; 2) if tied for top 4 seeds, one-game playoff; 3) head-to-head record; 4) head-to-head point differential; 5) overall point differential
(H) Hosts

=== Match-up results ===
	Round 1							Round 2						
Team ╲ Game	1	2	3	4	5	6	7	8	9	10	11	12	13	14
Adamson	UP school colors	FEU school colors	NU school colors	La Salle school colors	UE school colors	Ateneo school colors	UST school colors	NU school colors	FEU school colors	UP school colors	Ateneo school colors	La Salle school colors	UE school colors	UST school colors
Ateneo	La Salle school colors	UST school colors	UE school colors	UP school colors	Adamson school colors	NU school colors	FEU school colors	UE school colors	UST school colors	La Salle school colors	Adamson school colors	UP school colors	NU school colors	FEU school colors
La Salle	Ateneo school colors	NU school colors	FEU school colors	Adamson school colors	UST school colors	UP school colors	UE school colors	FEU school colors	NU school colors	Ateneo school colors	UST school colors	Adamson school colors	UP school colors	UE school colors
FEU	UE school colors	Adamson school colors	La Salle school colors	UST school colors	NU school colors	UP school colors	Ateneo school colors	La Salle school colors	Adamson school colors	UE school colors	UP school colors	NU school colors	UST school colors	Ateneo school colors
NU	UST school colors	La Salle school colors	Adamson school colors	UE school colors	FEU school colors	Ateneo school colors	UP school colors	Adamson school colors	La Salle school colors	UST school colors	UE school colors	FEU school colors	Ateneo school colors	UP school colors
UE	FEU school colors	UP school colors	Ateneo school colors	NU school colors	Adamson school colors	UST school colors	La Salle school colors	Ateneo school colors	UP school colors	FEU school colors	NU school colors	UST school colors	Adamson school colors	La Salle school colors
UP	Adamson school colors	UE school colors	UST school colors	Ateneo school colors	La Salle school colors	FEU school colors	NU school colors	UST school colors	UE school colors	Adamson school colors	FEU school colors	Ateneo school colors	La Salle school colors	NU school colors
UST	NU school colors	Ateneo school colors	UP school colors	La Salle school colors	UE school colors	FEU school colors	Adamson school colors	UP school colors	Ateneo school colors	NU school colors	La Salle school colors	UE school colors	FEU school colors	Adamson school colors

= Win; = OT win; = Loss; = OT loss

=== Scores ===
Results on top and to the right of the dashes are for first-round games; those to the bottom and to the left of it are second-round games.

Teams	AdU	AdMU	DLSU	FEU	NU	UE	UP	UST
Adamson Soaring Falcons	—	55–58	64–62	57–64	69–53	51–59	68–54	65–70
Ateneo Blue Eagles	83–63	—	75–72	67–64	67–56	74–50	72–63	81–70
De La Salle Green Archers	~~79–67~~	~~72-61~~	—	~~69–54~~	~~60–40~~	79–82	~~69–68~~	~~79–75~~
FEU Tamaraws	58–55	65–51	70–52	—	86–85*	89–61	63–56	83–65
NU Bulldogs	65–70	58–62	~~51–80~~	65–78	—	51–67	56–69	71–86
UE Red Warriors	57–53	64–59	~~61–81~~	62–64	67–45	—	63–56	72–74
UP Fighting Maroons	66–55	74–69	~~52–70~~	61–56	64–55	65–57	—	77–81
UST Growling Tigers	61–72	62–77	~~77–86~~	57–66	63–82	59–77	74–79	—

Source: Philippine Daily Inquirer
Legend: Blue = left column team win; Red = top row team win.
Matches with lighter background shading were decided after overtime.

== Second seed playoff ==
Ateneo and La Salle ended tied for second; as a result, a playoff was held to determine which team will clinch the #2 seed and the twice-to-beat advantage that goes along with it, a de facto first game of a best-of-three series.

Studio 23

September 14
3:30 p.m.

De La Salle Green Archers	~~82–69~~	Ateneo Blue Eagles
Scoring by quarter: 21–17, 20–17, 21–15, 20–20
Pts: Mark Cardona 20; Rebs: Junjun Cabatu 11; Asts: TY Tang 7		Pts: LA Tenorio 22; Rebs: 3 players, 8 each Asts: Tenorio, Intal 3 each
La Salle wins the twice to beat advantage; La Salle subsequently forfeited all wins in this season

Araneta Coliseum, Quezon City

La Salle's Mark Cardona scored 13 points to give the Green Archers a 41–34 lead early in the game. Early in the third quarter, La Salle scored eight unanswered baskets to give them a 15-point lead; later in the quarter, Ateneo's top scorer JC Intal, who was suffering from fever, fouled out with six points. Further offensive incursions ballooned La Salle's lead to 19 in the fourth quarter that sealed the victory for the Green Archers. La Salle will possess the twice-to-beat advantage against Ateneo in their semifinal series.

== Bracket ==
Semifinals (Top 2 twice-to-beat)
1	FEU	71
4	UE	64
2	~~La Salle~~	~~69~~
3	Ateneo	~~55~~

Finals (Best-of-three playoff)
1	FEU	~~51~~	67	~~65~~
2	~~La Salle~~	~~58~~	57	~~68~~

After La Salle's two ineligible players were discovered after UAAP Season 68, all of their games from Season 66-68 were forfeited. Prior to the forfeiture, La Salle returned their Season 67 championship trophy and their Season 68 runner-up trophy. The UAAP Board subsequently awarded the trophy to FEU in 2006.

== Semifinals ==
FEU and La Salle have the twice-to-beat advantage, with them only have to win once, while the opponents twice, to progress.

=== (1) FEU vs. (4) UE ===
Studio 23

September 16
4:00 p.m.

FEU Tamaraws	71–64	UE Red Warriors
Scoring by quarter: 20–20, 13–21, 21–11, 17–12
Pts: Denok Miranda 19		Pts: Hubalde, Saguindel 16 each
FEU wins series in one game

Philsports Arena, Pasig

With UE up 44–33 at halftime, FEU had a 17–7 run in the third quarter to lead the game 50–48. In the fourth quarter, the Tamaraws had another 12–2 run to lead by 12 points. UE's Paolo Hubalde led an 8–2 run that cut FEU's lead to six, but the Red Warriors turned the ball over three times in the final minutes. Dennis Miranda had a game-high 19 points to lead the Tamaraws to their second-consecutive finals berth.

=== (2) La Salle vs. (3) Ateneo ===
Studio 23

September 19
4:00 p.m.

De La Salle Green Archers	~~69–55~~	Ateneo Blue Eagles
Scoring by quarter: 13–13, 17–15, 19–7, 20–20
Pts: Mark Cardona 24; Rebs: Junjun Cabatu 11; Asts: Mark Cardona 5		Pts: Tenorio, Membrere 11 each Rebs: 4 players, 6 each Asts: LA Tenorio 5
La Salle wins series in one game; La Salle subsequently forfeited all wins in this season

Araneta Coliseum, Quezon City

At the first half, La Salle led by two points 30–28. Jerwin Gaco and JV Casio padded La Salle's lead to 14 points to close the third quarter. Mark Cardona scored a three-point shot and earned La Salle an insurmountable 18-point lead. Magnum Membrere will convert two consecutive three-point shots to cut the lead to ten with less than two minutes remaining but La Salle would hold on and meet defending champions FEU in the finals.

== Finals ==
This is a best-of-three playoff.

=== Game 1 ===
Studio 23

September 23
4:00 p.m.

FEU Tamaraws	~~51–58~~	De La Salle Green Archers
Scoring by quarter: 10–24, 16–15, 12–14, 13–5
Pts: Arwind Santos 14; Rebs: Arwind Santos 12; Asts: Miranda, Yabut 3 each		Pts: Ryan Araña 16; Rebs: Junjun Cabatu 8 Asts: Cardona, Cabatu 4 each
La Salle leads series 1–0; La Salle subsequently forfeited all wins in this season

Araneta Coliseum, Quezon City

La Salle led 24–10 after the first quarter with Ryan Araña and Mark Cardona leading the effort. The Green Archers increased their lead to 19 points in the third quarter when FEU's RJ Rizada and Arwind Santos unsuccessfully led a late-game run to undermine the rout. La Salle held on to lead the series, with Cardona having 15 points and Araña scoring a game-high of 16 points; Santos had a double-double performance of 14 points and 12 rebounds and teammates Rizada and Dennis Miranda scored 10 points in a losing effort.

=== Game 2 ===
Studio 23

September 26
4:00 p.m.

FEU Tamaraws	67–57	De La Salle Green Archers
Scoring by quarter: 18–14, 24–18, 8–16, 17–9
Pts: R.J. Rizada 13; Rebs: Arwind Santos 15; Asts: R.J. Rizada 4		Pts: Mark Cardona 18; Rebs: Junjun Cabatu 10; Asts: 3 players, 3 each
Series tied 1–1

Araneta Coliseum, Quezon City

FEU's RJ Rizada and Jeff Chan scored the team's 11 of 18 first quarter points to set the tone of the game; Rizada and Paul Flores led FEU in the second quarter to secure a 42–32 halftime lead. Ty Tang, Mark Cardona and Ryan Araña cut FEU's lead to two points at the end of the third, but FEU scored ten unanswered points, preventing La Salle from scoring until there were only five minutes left in the fourth, to settle the outcome of the game, and extend their title defense. Santos had another double-double performance, scoring ten points and grabbing 15 rebounds. Cardona, who was beaten by Santos in the season Most Valuable Player honors that was awarded prior to the game, had a game-high 18 points.

=== Game 3 ===
The game was held a day before the 29th anniversary of the Thrilla in Manila which was also held at the Araneta Coliseum, the venue of the Finals.

Studio 23

September 30
4:00 p.m.

FEU Tamaraws	~~65–68~~	De La Salle Green Archers
Scoring by quarter: 18–14, 14–18, 11–18, 22–18
Pts: Arwind Santos 17; Rebs: Arwind Santos 13; Asts: Denok Miranda 3		Pts: Mark Cardona 17; Rebs: Junjun Cabatu 6 Asts: Yeo, Cabatu 4 each
La Salle wins series 2–1, La Salle subsequently forfeited all wins in this season; FEU awarded championship

Araneta Coliseum, Quezon City

- Finals Most Valuable Player: Mark Cardona (De La Salle Green Archers)

The deciding game was close all throughout, but La Salle built a 54–43 lead at the start of the fourth quarter after a Rico Maierhofer put-back. FEU then had a 16–3 run to give the Tamaraws back the lead with 4:14 left. Jerwin Gaco broke the FEU run, but Miranda and Mark Isip each split their free-throws to bring back the lead to FEU with 2:21 left. Gaco and Joseph Yeo scored a basket each to wrest the lead back to La Salle, but Isip made his own two consecutive baskets to give FEU the lead with 37 seconds left. With La Salle having the possession, JV Casio scored a three-point shot off a fake that freed him from Miranda's defenses that gave La Salle the lead. Miranda drove hard to the basket but missed, and another FEU put-back from pointblank range also resulted in a miss; Cardona rebounded the ball, that led to him being fouled by Miranda with 2.4 seconds left. Cardona split his free-throws, Jeff Chan got the ball and heaved from half court but missed, clinching the championship to La Salle.

== Broadcast notes ==
=== UAAP Final Four ===
September 16, 2004

Game	Play-by-play	Analyst	Team
Game 1	Boom Gonzalez	Ronnie Magsanoc	FEU vs. UE

September 19, 2004

Game	Play-by-play	Analyst	Team
Game 1	Boom Gonzalez	TJ Manotoc	DLSU vs. ADMU

=== UAAP Finals ===
Game	Play-by-play	Analyst
Game 1	Sev Sarmenta	Randy Sacdalan
Game 2	Boom Gonzalez	TJ Manotoc
Game 3	Sev Sarmenta	Randy Sacdalan

== Awards ==
The awards were given out prior to Game 2 at the Araneta Coliseum:

- Most Valuable Player: Arwind Santos (FEU Tamaraws)
- Rookie of the Year: Marcy Arellano (UE Red Warriors)
- Mythical Five:
  - Arwind Santos (FEU Tamaraws)
  - Mark Cardona (De La Salle Green Archers)
  - LA Tenorio (Ateneo Blue Eagles)
  - Paolo Bugia (Ateneo Blue Eagles)
  - Dennis Miranda (FEU Tamaraws)
- Most Improved Player: JC Intal (Ateneo Blue Eagles)

== La Salle forfeiture of the championship ==
At the end of the 2005 finals in which FEU won over La Salle, it was revealed that La Salle unknowingly fielded two ineligible players. This caused them to return the 2004 championship trophy and the 2005 runner-up trophy. The league would later suspend La Salle for the 2006 season, give the 2004 championship trophy to FEU, and forfeit all of their games from 2003 to 2005.

== See also ==
- NCAA Season 80 basketball tournaments

== Footnotes ==
Preceded by Season 66 (2003)	UAAP men's basketball seasons Season 67 (2004) basketball	Succeeded by Season 68 (2005)
