= Fritz Gaston =

Filipino basketball player and coach

Commissioner of the Philippine Sports Commission
- Incumbent
- Assumed office March 4, 2023

Commissioner of the Games and Amusements Board
- In office 2011–2017
- Basketball career

Personal information
- Listed height: 6 ft 1 in (1.85 m)
- Listed weight: 175 lb (79 kg)

Career information
- College: Ateneo
- Playing career: 1979–1986
- Position: Guard
- Number: 14, 20, 22

Career history

Playing
- 1979 – 1980: U/Tex Wranglers
- 1983: San Miguel Beermen
- 1984: Crispa Redmanizers
- 1985: Manila Beer Brewmasters
- 1986: Great Taste Coffee Makers

Coaching
- 1988: Ateneo
- 1997: Mobiline Cellulars
- 2003, 2007: Philippines (women)

Career highlights
- As head coach: UAAP champion (1988); As player: PBA champion (1984 First All-Filipino); NCAA champion (1975, 1976)
Medals
Men's basketball
Representing Philippines
SEA Games
Gold medal – first place	1977 Kuala Lumpur	Team
Head coach Philippines
SEABA Women's Championship
Silver medal – second place	2007 Phuket	Team
Southeast Asian Games
Bronze medal – third place	2007 Nakhon Ratchasima	Team

Matthew "Fritz" Gaston is a Filipino former basketball player and coach.

== Career ==
=== Playing career ===
==== College ====
The basketball team of the Ateneo de Manila University had Gaston as a player. He was part of the Ateneo squad which won two consecutive titles in the National Collegiate Athletic Association (NCAA) in 1975 and 1976. He was part of the last NCAA Ateneo squad before the university left the collegiate league in 1978 to transfer to the University Athletic Association of the Philippines (UAAP).

==== Club ====
Gaston also played in the Philippine Basketball Association from 1979 to 1986. He played for multiple teams namely as the U/Tex Wranglers (1980), San Miguel Beermen (1983), Crispa Redmanizers (1984), Manila Beer Brewmasters (1985) and the Great Taste Coffee Makers (1986). With U/Tex he clinched the 1980 PBA All-Filipino Conference title.

==== National team ====
He was also a player for the Philippine youth national team in 1977.

=== Coaching career ===
Gaston became coach of his alma mater's basketball team. He led the Ateneo Blue Eagles to a UAAP title in Season 51 (1988).

He served as an assistant coach under Norman Black for the Mobiline Cellulars for the 1997 PBA All-Filipino Cup and Commissioner's Cup.

In 2003, Gaston became the head coach of the Philippines women's national basketball team. He guided the team to a bronze medal finish at the 2007 Southeast Asian Games in Thailand and a silver medal finish at the 2007 SEABA Championship for Women.

=== Sports administration ===
Gaston was commissioner for the Games and Amusement Board, a government body which deals with professional sports in the Philippines, from 2011 to 2017. He would be later appointed as a commissioner for the Philippine Sports Commission (that administers grassroots and amateur sports) on March 24, 2023 by President Bongbong Marcos.

== Personal life ==
Gaston has Silay, Negros Occidental as his hometown. Gaston is married to Aurora Mandanas Gaston, a former beauty pageant contestant who won the 1984 Miss Asia Pacific.

His daughter, Pauline is a professional volleyball player who has played in the Filipino Premier Volleyball League. Therese, another daughter is a former collegiate volleyball player and a beauty pageant queen like her mother.
