= Nel Parado =

Filipino basketball coach

Reonel Parado
Personal information
- Listed height: 5 ft 7 in (1.70 m)

Career information
- High school: San Beda (Manila)
- College: San Beda
- Position: Point guard
- Coaching career: 1996–2006

Career history

Playing
- 1994: Burger Machine

Coaching
- 1996: Philippines (assistant)
- 1996: Philippines women
- 1998: Pangasinan Waves (assistant)
- 1999: Cagayan de Oro Amigos (assistant)
- 1999: Cagayan de Oro Amigos (interim)
- 2000: Cagayan de Oro Amigos (assistant)
- 2000–2002: Cagayan de Oro Amigos
- 2000–2003: Benilde (assistant)
- 2003–2006: UST

Career highlights
- As assistant coach: NCAA Champion (2000)

Reonel "Nel" Parado is a Filipino former basketball coach.

== Career ==
=== Playing ===
A San Beda Red Lion, Parado played for Burger Machine in the PBL.

=== Coaching ===
==== With Dong Vergeire ====
Parado started his coaching gig with Dong Vergeire, his former teammate at San Beda High School. They started their partnership at Philippine team, as Vergeire as head coach while Parado as assistant, who is concurrently coaching its women's counterpart.

==== MBA ====
Parado also worked with Vergeire at Pangasinan Waves as assistant. Parado later became an assistant for Cagayan de Oro Amigos. But became an interim head coach in late 1999 MBA season. He was later returned to his post after Arlene Rodriguez' appointment in early 2000, but later resigned in late part of that year and made Parado its permanent coach.

==== Benilde ====
He later reunited with Vergeire, this time at Benilde Blazers, and won the 2000 championship.

==== UST ====
He became the interim coach of UST Growling Tigers after the resignation of Aric del Rosario. Vergeire, a former del Rosario's assistant was originally hired, but due to Cebuana Lhuillier commitment, Vergeire recommended Parado as the new head coach.

Parado begin coaching in the postseason when UST participated in the 2003 PBL Platinum Cup. Their respectable showing in the tournament earned Parado a nod and a permanent tenure from the school's Institute of the Physical Education and Athletics. The Growling Tigers were off to a fair start in their 2004 UAAP campaign as they ended the first round tied at third place with La Salle and UE with a 4–3 record. UST, however failed to win a single game in the second round to finish the season at seventh place with a 4–10 record.

The Growling Tigers broke their 1989 record for their worst start when they went 0–5 to open the 2005 season. Their 12-game losing streak which began at the start of the second round of the previous season ended with their 107–100 overtime win over the winless NU Bulldogs. NU got back at UST with a 74–73 second round win for their first and only victory of the season. The Tigers ended the elimination rounds with the same 4–10 record from 2004, but on a higher rank at sixth place above Adamson and NU. The lone highlight of their campaign was when they stopped Ateneo's seven-game win streak in the second round by winning, 77–73. It was a turnaround for the team after placing third in the Father Martin Cup and winning the PRISAA tournament in the offseason. Jervy Cruz, who was a member of their training pool won the PRISAA MVP award. He was set to play his first year in the UAAP, but was pulled out of the roster due to academic deficiencies.

When Parado's contract expired in February 2006, he was replaced by alumni and former Ginebra player Pido Jarencio.

== Outside basketball ==
Onel called by some people, he was featured in the March 15, 2004 pilot episode of GMA's TV newscast 24 Oras, on its segment Imbestigador ng Bayan narrated by Mike Enriquez which discuss the popularity of Mane 'N Tail horse shampoo for human usage and the fake products of the brand. Parado tells that when he used the shampoo product, he feels that his hair heating, and discovered that he is using fake product of the brand.

== Coaching record ==
Record table
Season	Team	Overall	Conference	Standing	Postseason
UST Growling Tigers (University Athletic Association of the Philippines) (2004–2005)
2004	UST	4–10	4–10	7th	Eliminated
2005	UST	4–10	4–10	7th	Eliminated
UST:		8–20 (.286)	8–20 (.286)		
Total:		8–20 (.286)			
National champion Postseason invitational champion Conference regular season champion Conference regular season and conference tournament champion Division regular season champion Division regular season and conference tournament champion Conference tournament champion
