= UAAP Season 50 basketball tournaments =

Basketball competition in the Philippines

UAAP Season 50
- Golden Year
- Host school: Ateneo de Manila University
Men's Finals	G1	Wins
Ateneo Blue Eagles	94	1+1
UE Red Warriors	92	0
- Duration: October 4, 1987
- Arena(s): Rizal Memorial Coliseum
- Winning coach: Cris Calilan
- TV network(s): PTV 4
Women's Finals	G1	Wins
UST Lady Goldies	113	1+1
Ateneo Lady Eagles	64	0
- Duration: October 4, 1987
- Arena(s): Rizal Memorial Coliseum
- Winning coach: Orly Bauzon
Juniors' Finals	G1	G2	Wins
FEU Baby Tamaraws	69	87	1+1
Adamson Baby Falcons	77	79	1
- Duration: October 4 & 8, 1987
- Arena(s): Rizal Memorial Coliseum
- Winning coach: Alfredo Amador

The UAAP Season 50 basketball tournaments involved 23 teams from the eight member schools that played two rounds of elimination games in the University Athletic Association of the Philippines (UAAP) in the 1987–88 school year. Ateneo de Manila University was the host school for the second time since joining the league in 1978.

The UP Fighting Maroons and the Adamson Lady Falcons were the defending men's and women's champions, while the Ateneo Blue Eaglets have been the juniors' champions since Season 46 (1983).

The games of the senior men's division began on July 18, 1987, while the women's and juniors' games began on July 19. The venue for the opening ceremonies was changed from the Araneta Coliseum to Rizal Memorial Coliseum due to its unavailability, with the ongoing Grand Circus Internationale which opened on July 2.

A special award was given to Professor Candido Bartolome of the University of the Philippines, being the last surviving founder of the UAAP on its 50th anniversary. Fr. Raymond Holscher, Ateneo's athletic director declared the games open.

The Ateneo Blue Eagles defeated the UE Red Warriors in the Finals to take their first UAAP men's basketball championship after transferring from the NCAA in 1978.

The NU Bulldogs ended their six-year losing streak when they defeated the Adamson Falcons and the UP Fighting Maroons for a 2–12 win-loss record.

== Teams ==
All eight member universities of the UAAP fielded teams in the men's and junior divisions. National University did not have a team in the women's division.

University	Men's team	Women's team	Juniors' team
Adamson University (AdU)	Falcons	Lady Falcons	Baby Falcons
Ateneo de Manila University (AdMU)	Blue Eagles	Lady Eagles	Blue Eaglets
De La Salle University (DLSU)	Green Archers	Lady Archers	Bengals
Far Eastern University (FEU)	Tamaraws	Lady Tamaraws	Baby Tamaraws
National University (NU)	Bulldogs	No team	Bullpups
University of the East (UE)	Red Warriors	Lady Warriors	Red Pages
University of the Philippines Diliman (UP)	Fighting Maroons	Lady Maroons	Junior Maroons
University of Santo Tomas (UST)	Glowing Goldies	Lady Goldies	Golden Nuggets

=== Coaches ===
University	Men's coach	Women's coach	Juniors' coach	Ref.
Adamson University	Nemie Villegas	Nilo Verona	Boy Ascue	
Ateneo de Manila University	Cris Calilan	Virgil Villavicencio	Chot Reyes	
De La Salle University	Derrick Pumaren	Pilo Pumaren	Cris Arroyo	
Far Eastern University	Fidel Que	Chito Lazaro	Alfredo Amador	
National University	Sonny Paguia	No team	Ernie Espejo	
University of the East	Roehl Nadurata	Benjamin Castillo	Fernando Lozano	
University of the Philippines Diliman	Ramon Bernabe	Georgie Henares	Audie Victorino	
University of Santo Tomas	Aric del Rosario	Orly Bauzon	Hector Hipolito	

=== Coaching changes ===
Team	Outgoing coach	Replaced by	Ref.
Ateneo Blue Eagles	Ed Ocampo	Cris Calilan	
UE Red Warriors	Johnny Revilla	Roehl Nadurata	
UP Fighting Maroons	Joe Lipa	Ramon Bernabe	
UE Lady Warriors	Fernando Lozano	Benjamin Castillo	
Ateneo Blue Eaglets	Cris Calilan	Chot Reyes	
DLSZ Bengals	Butch Bautista	Cris Arroyo	
UE Red Pages	Rodolfo Gabriel	Fernando Lozano	

== Venues ==
The Rizal Memorial Coliseum in Manila was the primary venue for the men's tournament and for the Finals series of the women's and juniors' tournament. The Loyola Center inside the Ateneo campus in Quezon City was the venue for the women's and boys' tournaments. The Uno High School Gym in Manila was an alternate site for the women's games.

Coordinates	Location	Stadium	Capacity	Year
14°33′43″N 120°59′38″E	Manila	Rizal Memorial Coliseum	6,100	1934–present
14°36′37″N 120°58′38″E	Manila	Uno High School Gym	2,800	1960–present
14°38′6″N 121°4′31″E	Quezon City	Loyola Center	7,500	1949–present

== Tournament format ==
- Double round robin eliminations, with the top two teams advancing to the Finals:

The team with the best win-loss record needs only to win once to clinch the championship;
The second-seeded team needs to beat the #1 seed twice to win the championship.

== Men's tournament ==
=== Elimination round ===
==== Team standings ====
Pos	Team	W	L	Pts	Qualification
1	Ateneo Blue Eagles (H)	13	1	27	Twice-to-beat in the finals
2	UE Red Warriors	10	4	24	Twice-to-win in the finals
3	UP Fighting Maroons	9	5	23	
4	FEU Tamaraws	8	6	22	
5	De La Salle Green Archers	6	8	20	
6	Adamson Falcons	5	9	19	
7	UST Glowing Goldies (Note: UST's first round wins over FEU and Ateneo, and both wins over Adamson were overturned after the UAAP board ruled Fedencio Oblina to be ineligible)	3	11	17	
8	NU Bulldogs	2	12	16	

Source: Google News Archives
Rules for classification: 1) match points; 2) if tied for #2, one-game playoff; 3) head-to-head record; 4) head-to-head point differential; 5) overall point differential
(H) Hosts
Notes:

As a result of a protest filed by Adamson against UST's sophomore forward Fedencio Oblina, the UAAP board found him to be ineligible for failing his NCEE qualifying tests, causing the reversal of four of UST's wins. The Glowing Goldies dropped to 7th place in the standings at 2–7 from their original 6–3 record. The forfeitures benefited Adamson, Ateneo and FEU. Ateneo found themselves on top of the standings with an 8–1 record. Oblina was later handed down a lifetime ban by the UAAP.

==== Match-up results ====
	Round 1							Round 2						
Team ╲ Game	1	2	3	4	5	6	7	8	9	10	11	12	13	14
Adamson	NU school colors	Ateneo school colors	UP school colors	La Salle school colors	UST school colors	FEU school colors	UE school colors	UE school colors	UST school colors	Ateneo school colors	La Salle school colors	FEU school colors	UP school colors	NU school colors
Ateneo	UP school colors	Adamson school colors	NU school colors	UE school colors	FEU school colors	UST school colors	La Salle school colors	FEU school colors	NU school colors	Adamson school colors	UP school colors	UE school colors	La Salle school colors	UST school colors
La Salle	FEU school colors	UE school colors	UST school colors	Adamson school colors	NU school colors	UP school colors	Ateneo school colors	UP school colors	UE school colors	UST school colors	Adamson school colors	NU school colors	Ateneo school colors	FEU school colors
FEU	La Salle school colors	UST school colors	UE school colors	NU school colors	Ateneo school colors	Adamson school colors	UP school colors	Ateneo school colors	UP school colors	UE school colors	NU school colors	Adamson school colors	UST school colors	La Salle school colors
NU	Adamson school colors	UP school colors	Ateneo school colors	FEU school colors	La Salle school colors	UE school colors	UST school colors	UST school colors	Ateneo school colors	UP school colors	FEU school colors	La Salle school colors	UE school colors	Adamson school colors
UE	UST school colors	La Salle school colors	FEU school colors	Ateneo school colors	UP school colors	NU school colors	Adamson school colors	Adamson school colors	La Salle school colors	FEU school colors	UST school colors	Ateneo school colors	NU school colors	UP school colors
UP	Ateneo school colors	NU school colors	Adamson school colors	UST school colors	UE school colors	La Salle school colors	FEU school colors	La Salle school colors	FEU school colors	NU school colors	Ateneo school colors	UST school colors	Adamson school colors	UE school colors
UST	UE school colors	FEU school colors	La Salle school colors	UP school colors	Adamson school colors	Ateneo school colors	NU school colors	NU school colors	Adamson school colors	La Salle school colors	UE school colors	UP school colors	FEU school colors	Ateneo school colors

Source: Google News Archives
= Win; = OT win; = Win by forfeit; = Loss; = OT loss; = Loss by forfeit

==== Scores ====
Results on top and to the right of the dashes are for first round games; those to the bottom and to the left of it are second round games.

Teams	AdU	AdMU	DLSU	FEU	NU	UE	UP	UST
Adamson	—	75–89	71–83	87–84	97–87	98–114	95–85	81–84 (Note: Win by forfeit)
Ateneo	105–94	—	95–91	78–68	107–94	102–100*	79–83	89–91
La Salle	88–71	89–98	—	79–83	91–89*	95–104	109–123*	89–76
FEU	113–88	81–87	99–87	—	118–93	107–94	104–105	81–88
NU	98–96	85–94	89–113	89–107	—	75–96	81–100	74–92
UE	94–82	102–105	89–76	91–82	102–99	—	116–100*	105–101*
UP	107–103	56–88	90–99	109–81	75–89	101–87	—	97–92
UST	99–81 (Note: Loss by forfeit)	101–108	100–85	84–96	116–104	110–116	83–92	—

Source: Google News Archives
Legend: Blue = left column team win; Red = top row team win.
Matches with lighter background shading were decided after overtime.

=== Finals ===
Top seed Ateneo only has to win once, while second seed UE has to win twice to clinch the championship.

==== Elimination round games ====
- August 12: Ateneo defeated UE, 102–100 in overtime at the Rizal Memorial Coliseum.

The Blue Eagles led at halftime, at 49–44. The score was tied at 90–all at the end of regulation.
The score was still tied at 100–all with eight seconds remaining in extra time when Jun Reyes was fouled by Conrado Barile. Reyes converted both free throws for an Ateneo win.
Nonoy Chuatico topscored with 24 points for Ateneo, while Verni Villarias had 35 for UE.

- September 20: Ateneo won again over UE, 105–102 in their second round game at the Rizal Memorial Coliseum.

They led the Warriors at the half, 60–58.
Jayvee Gayoso led the Eagles in scoring with 26 points, while Jerry Codiñera had 32 for UE.

The UE Warriors were gunning for their 19th championship, while the Blue Eagles had reached the Finals for only the first time since joining the UAAP in 1978. (Ateneo held a twice-to-beat advantage over UE.)

PTV 4

October 4
4:30 p.m.PHT

Report

Ateneo Blue Eagles	94–92	UE Red Warriors
Scoring by half: 38-51, 56-41
Pts: Eric Reyes 23		Pts: Verni Villarias 17
Ateneo wins series in one game

Rizal Memorial Coliseum
Attendance: 6,000+
Referees: Rado Mercado, Nick Peñalosa

The UE Warriors capitalized on the absence of Danny Francisco with a strong start. The Ateneo starting center was earlier hospitalized for a lung-related illness. The Blue Eagles' Jayvee Gayoso scored the first basket, but the Warriors sped off to a 10–2 run and ended the half with a 51–38 lead.

Despite Jerry Codiñera's foul trouble, the Warriors were able to extend their lead to 83–63 with ten minutes remaining. Amid cheers from supporters in the stands, Ateneo erupted for a 22–2 run. Jett Nieto's three-point shot sparked the rally until the scores were tied at 85-all.

UE coach Roehl Nadurata was ejected from the game in the last 3:03 after complaining against an offensive foul slapped on Conrado Barile. The Warriors were trailing, 86–87. UE's Modesto Hojilla was then called for an unsportsmanlike foul in the ensuing play when he cut into the path of Ateneo's Nonoy Chuatico who was driving for a basket. Chuatico split his charities, but the Blue Eagles still had ball possession as a result of the flagrant foul. A desperation foul by Codiñera with three seconds left in the game sent Eric Reyes to the freethrow line where he also made one out of two shots for the final count of 94–92.

The Ateneo Blue Eagles have won their first UAAP men's championship. In contrast, the UE Warriors have lost in a Finals series after having a wide lead over their opponents for the second straight year. They were defeated by the UP Fighting Maroons in 1986.

=== Awards ===
UAAP Season 50 men's basketball champions
Ateneo Blue Eagles
First title

- Most Valuable Player: Jun Reyes (Ateneo Blue Eagles)

=== Broadcasting ===
PTV 4 was the official broadcaster of the UAAP Season 50 Men's basketball games.

- Dick Ildefonso, play-by-play
- Chot Reyes, analyst
- Danny Ochoa, broadcast director

== Women's tournament ==
=== Elimination round ===
==== Team standings ====
Pos	Team	W	L	Pts	Qualification
1	UST Lady Goldies	11	1	23	Twice-to-beat in the finals
2	Ateneo Lady Eagles (H)	7	5	19 (Note: Second-seed playoff: Ateneo 64–60 FEU)	Twice-to-win in the finals
3	FEU Lady Tamaraws	7	5	19	
4	Adamson Lady Falcons (Note: All of Adamson's first round wins were overturned after the UAAP board ruled Irmina de Guzman to be ineligible)	6	6	18 (Note: Head-to-head record: Adamson 1–1 La Salle; Adamson +16)	
5	De La Salle Lady Archers	6	6	18	
6	UE Lady Warriors	3	9	15	
7	UP Lady Maroons	2	10	14	

Source: Google News Archives
Rules for classification: 1) match points; 2) if tied for #2, one-game playoff; 3) head-to-head record; 4) head-to-head point differential; 5) overall point differential
(H) Hosts
Notes:

Adamson's wins in the first round were reversed into losses after the board found Irmina de Guzman ineligible for skipping the one-year residency rule. De Guzman had earlier transferred to the Lady Falcons' team from FEU.

==== Match-up results ====
	Round 1						Round 2					
Team ╲ Game	1	2	3	4	5	6	7	8	9	10	11	12
Adamson	Ateneo school colors	UE school colors	UP school colors	FEU school colors	La Salle school colors	UST school colors	FEU school colors	Ateneo school colors	UE school colors	UP school colors	La Salle school colors	UST school colors
Ateneo	UE school colors	Adamson school colors	UP school colors	UST school colors	La Salle school colors	FEU school colors	La Salle school colors	UP school colors	Adamson school colors	UST school colors	UE school colors	FEU school colors
La Salle	UST school colors	UP school colors	UE school colors	Ateneo school colors	Adamson school colors	FEU school colors	Ateneo school colors	FEU school colors	UE school colors	UST school colors	Adamson school colors	UP school colors
FEU	UP school colors	UE school colors	UST school colors	Adamson school colors	Ateneo school colors	La Salle school colors	Adamson school colors	La Salle school colors	UP school colors	UE school colors	UST school colors	Ateneo school colors
UE	Ateneo school colors	FEU school colors	Adamson school colors	La Salle school colors	UST school colors	UP school colors	UP school colors	UST school colors	La Salle school colors	Adamson school colors	FEU school colors	Ateneo school colors
UP	FEU school colors	La Salle school colors	Ateneo school colors	Adamson school colors	UST school colors	UE school colors	UE school colors	Ateneo school colors	UST school colors	FEU school colors	Adamson school colors	La Salle school colors
UST	La Salle school colors	FEU school colors	Ateneo school colors	UE school colors	UP school colors	Adamson school colors	UE school colors	UP school colors	La Salle school colors	Ateneo school colors	FEU school colors	Adamson school colors

Source: Google News Archives
= Win; = OT win; = Win by forfeit; = Loss; = OT loss; = Loss by forfeit

==== Scores ====
Results on top and to the right of the dashes are for first round games; those to the bottom and to the left of it are second round games.

Teams	AdU	AdMU	DLSU	FEU	UE	UP	UST
Adamson	—	79–28 (Note: Loss by forfeit)	71–52	77–50	70–60	76–29	62–94
Ateneo	45–74	—	68–66	73–85	65–59	1–0 (Note: Score unavailable)	41–84
La Salle	62–80	64–59	—	38–58	47–44	69–32	56–73
FEU	62–70	61–62	65–41	—	0–1	49–31	54–62
UE	45–64	60–66	51–68	55–64	—	57–61	42–69
UP	43–88	42–55	49–67	53–73	42–58	—	38–82
UST	67–86	105–40	96–75	102–65	64–54	83–34	—

Source: Google News Archives
Legend: Blue = left column team win; Red = top row team win.

UST failed to get a sweep when they lost to the Adamson Lady Falcons in the last game of the double round robin eliminations, 67–86. The Lady Goldies struggled early in the game, yielding a 27–44 halftime deficit to Adamson.

A playoff to determine UST's Finals opponent was held between FEU and Ateneo after the Lady Eagles defeated the Lady Tamaraws in the last game of eliminations, 62–61. Both teams ended up with identical 7–5 records.

=== Playoffs ===
#2-seed playoff			Finals (#1 has twice-to-beat advantage)
			1	UST	113
2	Ateneo	64	2	Ateneo	64
3	FEU	60

=== Second seed playoff ===
This is a one-game playoff. The winner advances to the Finals with a twice-to-win disadvantage; the loser is eliminated.

==== Elimination round games ====
- August 9: FEU defeated Ateneo, 85–73 at the Loyola Center.

The Lady Tamaraws led at halftime, 48–33.
Estela Galang topscored with 18 points for FEU, while Peachy Cheng had a season high of 40 points for Ateneo.

- September 23: Ateneo got back at FEU in their second round game with a 62–61 win at the Loyola Center.

They led the Lady Tamaraws at the half, 27–22.
Cheng once again led the Eagles in scoring with 24 points, while Galang had 19 for FEU.

September 27
10:00 a.m.PHT

Report

Ateneo Lady Eagles	64–60	FEU Lady Tamaraws
Scoring by half: 29-28, 35-32
Pts: Cheng, Lazaro 22 each		Pts: Jocelyn Doles 13
Ateneo advances to the Finals

Uno High School Gym

Ateneo won the playoff for the second Finals berth over FEU on September 27. The Lady Eagles fielded a team for the first time in the UAAP and had barely been together with three weeks to go before the start of the season. They needed to beat FEU twice in order to qualify for the Finals against season leader UST. They were behind the Lady Tamaraws in the standings with a 6–5 record heading into the last game of the elimination round.

=== Finals ===
Top seed UST only has to win once, while second seed Ateneo has to win twice to clinch the championship.

==== Elimination round games ====
- August 2: UST defeated Ateneo, 84–41 at the Loyola Center.

The Lady Goldies led at halftime, 41–26.
Jho Gutierrez topscored with 17 points for UST, while Mitchie Lazaro had 13 for Ateneo.

- September 13: UST won again over Ateneo, 105–40 in their second round game at the Loyola Center.

Brigida Duran led the Lady Goldies in scoring with 20 points, while Lazaro had 14 for Ateneo.

The UST Lady Goldies were gunning for their fourth championship, with the Lady Eagles vying for their first on the year that the team was formed. (UST held a twice-to-beat advantage over Ateneo.)

October 4
3:00 p.m.PHT

Report

UST Lady Goldies	113–64	Ateneo Lady Eagles
Scoring by half: 47-29, 66-35
Pts: Clemence Pastor 32		Pts: Peachy Cheng 22
UST wins series after one game

Rizal Memorial Coliseum

=== Awards ===
UAAP Season 50 women's basketball champions
UST Growling Tigresses
Fourth title
(known as the Lady Goldies in 1987)

== Juniors' tournament ==
=== Elimination round ===
==== Team standings ====
Pos	Team	W	L	Pts	Qualification
1	FEU Baby Tamaraws	13	1	27	Twice-to-beat in the finals
2	Adamson Baby Falcons	11	3	25	Twice-to-win in the finals
3	Ateneo Blue Eaglets (H)	10	4	24	
4	UST Golden Nuggets	9	5	23	
5	DLSZ Bengals	6	8	20	
6	NU Bullpups	4	10	18	
7	UPIS Junior Fighting Maroons	2	12	16	
8	UE Red Pages	1	13	15	

Source: Google News Archives
Rules for classification: 1) match points; 2) if tied for #2, one-game playoff; 3) head-to-head record; 4) head-to-head point differential; 5) overall point differential
(H) Hosts

==== Match-up results ====
	Round 1							Round 2						
Team ╲ Game	1	2	3	4	5	6	7	8	9	10	11	12	13	14
Adamson	NU school colors	FEU school colors	UST school colors	Ateneo school colors	La Salle school colors	UE school colors	UP school colors	UE school colors	UP school colors	La Salle school colors	NU school colors	UST school colors	FEU school colors	Ateneo school colors
Ateneo	UP school colors	UST school colors	FEU school colors	Adamson school colors	UE school colors	La Salle school colors	NU school colors	NU school colors	La Salle school colors	UP school colors	UE school colors	FEU school colors	UST school colors	Adamson school colors
DLSZ	FEU school colors	UP school colors	NU school colors	UE school colors	Adamson school colors	Ateneo school colors	UST school colors	FEU school colors	Ateneo school colors	Adamson school colors	UST school colors	UE school colors	NU school colors	UP school colors
FEU	La Salle school colors	Adamson school colors	Ateneo school colors	UST school colors	NU school colors	UP school colors	UE school colors	La Salle school colors	UE school colors	NU school colors	UP school colors	Ateneo school colors	Adamson school colors	UST school colors
NU	Adamson school colors	UE school colors	La Salle school colors	UP school colors	FEU school colors	UST school colors	Ateneo school colors	Ateneo school colors	UST school colors	FEU school colors	Adamson school colors	UP school colors	La Salle school colors	UE school colors
UE	UST school colors	NU school colors	UP school colors	La Salle school colors	Ateneo school colors	Adamson school colors	FEU school colors	Adamson school colors	FEU school colors	UST school colors	Ateneo school colors	La Salle school colors	UP school colors	NU school colors
UPIS	Ateneo school colors	La Salle school colors	UE school colors	NU school colors	UST school colors	FEU school colors	Adamson school colors	UST school colors	Adamson school colors	Ateneo school colors	FEU school colors	NU school colors	UE school colors	La Salle school colors
UST	UE school colors	Ateneo school colors	Adamson school colors	FEU school colors	UP school colors	NU school colors	La Salle school colors	UP school colors	NU school colors	UE school colors	La Salle school colors	Adamson school colors	Ateneo school colors	FEU school colors

Source: Google News Archives
= Win; = OT win; = Loss; = OT loss

==== Scores ====
Results on top and to the right of the dashes are for first round games; those to the bottom and to the left of it are second round games.

Teams	AdU	AdMU	DLSZ	FEU	NU	UE	UPIS	UST
Adamson	—	79–74	92–64	68–66	99–77	106–75	111–64	89–75
Ateneo	1–0 (Note: Score unavailable)	—	97–70	73–88	87–80	90–68	95–65	74–68
DLSZ	0–1	74–73	—	84–109	68–74	88–76	89–87	62–92
FEU	77–74	61–55	86–75	—	87–78	95–74	101–96	88–74
NU	76–117	74–111	66–72	0–1	—	74–72	81–85	72–85
UE	91–136	89–109	65–87	82–112	69–76	—	83–78	67–75
UPIS	85–120	0–1	60–67	55–60	65–69	62–61	—	57–85
UST	85–83	71–73	105–64	79–83	91–82	1–0	80–61	—

Source: Google News Archives
Legend: Blue = left column team win; Red = top row team win.

The Ateneo Blue Eaglets were eliminated from the Finals for the first time since the 1982 season after finishing third in the eliminations with a 10–4 record. They finished behind Adamson with only a one game difference, though the Baby Falcons earlier led in the standings with an 11–0 record until the final three games of the second round.

=== Finals ===
Top seed FEU only has to win once, while second seed Adamson has to win twice to clinch the championship.

==== Elimination round games ====
- July 25: Adamson defeated FEU, 68–66 at the Loyola Center.

The Baby Falcons led at halftime, at 38–28, but the Baby Tamaraws rallied to close the gap. The game was decided in the last 43 seconds when a fouled Terry James Pearson converted both his free throws to break away from a 66–all deadlock with FEU and send his Baby Falcons team to their second-straight victory of the tournament.
Antonio Barrameda topscored with 16 points for Adamson, while Johnny Abarrientos and Sixto Mondarte had 14 apiece for FEU.

- September 13: FEU got back at Adamson in their second round game with a 77–74 win at the Loyola Center. The Baby Tamaraws have taken over the lead in the standings after handing the Baby Falcons their second straight loss.

They led Adamson at the half, at 44–38.
Abarrientos led FEU in scoring with 24 points, while Robert Talamayan had 23 for the Baby Falcons.

October 4
1:30 p.m.PHT

Report

FEU Baby Tamaraws	69–77	Adamson Baby Falcons
Scoring by half: 38-36, 31-41
Pts: Johnny Abarrientos 31		Pts: Antonio Peñaranda 23

Rizal Memorial Coliseum

October 8
3:00 p.m.PHT

Report

FEU Baby Tamaraws	87–78	Adamson Baby Falcons
Scoring by half: 46-34, 41-44
Pts: Sixto Mondarte 29		Pts: Barrameda, Nodado 17 each
FEU wins series in two games

Rizal Memorial Coliseum

The FEU Baby Tamaraws reclaimed the championship they last won in 1976. The second-seeded Adamson Baby Falcons negated FEU's twice-to-beat advantage by winning, 77–69 to extend the Finals series to a second game. FEU prevailed with an 87–79 win for their seventh title in the junior's tournament.

=== Awards ===
UAAP Season 50 juniors' basketball champions
FEU–D Baby Tamaraws
Seventh title
(known as the FEU Baby Tamaraws in 1987)

== Overall championship points ==
Pts.	Ranking
15	Champion
12	2nd
10	3rd
8	4th
6	5th
4	6th
2	7th
1	8th
—	Did not join
WD	Withdrew

In case of ties, the team with the higher position in any tournament is ranked higher. If both are still tied, they are listed in alphabetical order.

=== Seniors' division ===
Team	Men	Women	Total
Ateneo Blue Eagles	15	12	27
FEU Tamaraws	8	10	18
UST Glowing Goldies	2	15	17
UE Warriors	12	4	16
UP Fighting Maroons	10	2	12
Adamson Falcons	4	8	12
De La Salle Green Archers	6	6	12
NU Bulldogs	1	—	1

=== Juniors' division ===
Team	Total
FEU Baby Tamaraws	15
Adamson Baby Falcons	12
Ateneo Blue Eaglets	10
UST Golden Nuggets	8
DLSZ Bengals	6
NU Bullpups	4
UPIS Junior Fighting Maroons	2
UE Red Pages	1

Preceded by Season 49 (1986)	UAAP basketball seasons Season 50 (1987)	Succeeded by Season 51 (1988)
