= UAAP Season 58 =

- Host school: Ateneo de Manila University

Overall
- Seniors: University of Santo Tomas
- Juniors: University of Santo Tomas

Seniors' champions
Sport		Men	Women
Basketball		UST	UST

Juniors' champions
Sport		Boys	Girls
Basketball		Ateneo	N/A
- (NT) = No tournament; (DS) = Demonstration Sport; (Ex) = Exhibition;

UAAP Season 58 is the 1995–96 athletic year of the University Athletic Association of the Philippines (UAAP), which was hosted by the Ateneo de Manila University.

It was first aired on PTV-4, it produced by Silverstar Sports.

== Basketball ==
=== Men's tournament ===
==== Team standings ====
Pos	Team	W	L	Pts	Qualification
1	UST Growling Tigers	11	3	25	Twice-to-beat in the semifinals
2	De La Salle Green Archers	10	4	24	Twice-to-beat in the semifinals
3	UE Red Warriors	10	4	24	Twice-to-win in the semifinals
4	FEU Tamaraws	8	6	22	Twice-to-win in the semifinals
5	UP Fighting Maroons	5	9	19	
6	Adamson Falcons	4	10	18 (Note: Head-to-head record: Adamson 1–1 Ateneo; Adamson +3)	
7	Ateneo Blue Eagles (H)	4	10	18	
8	NU Bulldogs	2	12	16	

(H) Hosts

==== Playoffs ====
Semifinals (Nos. 1 & 2 have twice-to-beat advantage)
1	UST	65	74
4	FEU	76	68
2	La Salle	86
3	UE	79

Finals (Best-of-three series)
1	UST	78	66	67
2	La Salle	88	62	64

== Overall championship race ==
=== Juniors' division ===
Rank	Team	Points
1	UST	0
1	–	0
1	–	0
1	–	0
1	–	0
1	–	0
1	–	0
1	–	0

Notes: Results are final.

=== Seniors' division ===
Rank	Team	Points
1	UST	0
1	La Salle	0
1	–	0
1	–	0
1	–	0
1	–	0
1	–	0
1	–	0

Notes: Results are final.
