= UAAP Season 59 =

- "The New Generation of Sports Excellence"
- Host school: De La Salle University

Overall
- Seniors: University of Santo Tomas
- Juniors: University of Santo Tomas

Seniors' champions
Sport		Men	Women
Basketball		UST	FEU

Juniors' champions
Sport		Boys	Girls
Basketball		UST	N/A
- (NT) = No tournament; (DS) = Demonstration Sport; (Ex) = Exhibition;

UAAP Season 59 is the 1996–97 season of the University Athletic Association of the Philippines (UAAP), which was hosted by De La Salle University-Manila. The season opened on July 13, 1996, at the Araneta Coliseum. The 3rd Annual UAAP Cheerdance Competition was also held after the opening ceremonies.

== Basketball ==
=== Men's tournament ===
==== Elimination round ====
Pos	Team	W	L	Pts	Qualification
1	De La Salle Green Archers (H)	11	3	25	Twice-to-beat in the semifinals
2	UST Growling Tigers	10	4	24	Twice-to-beat in the semifinals
3	UP Fighting Maroons	9	5	23	Twice-to-win in the semifinals
4	UE Red Warriors	8	6	22	Twice-to-win in the semifinals
5	Ateneo Blue Eagles	7	7	21	
6	FEU Tamaraws	4	10	18	
7	NU Bulldogs	4	10	18	
8	Adamson Falcons	3	11	17	

Source: Manila Standard via Google News
(H) Hosts

==== Playoffs ====
Semifinals (Nos. 1 & 2 have twice-to-beat advantage)
1	La Salle	67
4	UE	55
2	UST	63
3	UP	56

Finals (Best-of-three series)
1	La Salle	60	54
2	UST	65	57

== Championships summary ==
=== Seniors' division championships ===
Men's
Rank	Basketball	Volleyball	Swimming	Chess	Table tennis	Tennis	Badminton	Track and field	Fencing	Taekwondo	Judo	Baseball	Football
1st	UST	FEU	DLSU	UST	UST	UST	ADMU	UE	UP	UST	UP	UST	DLSU
2nd	DLSU	UST	UP	UP	AdU	UP	UST	FEU	ADMU	DLSU		UP	ADMU
3rd	UP	DLSU	UST	DLSU	UP	DLSU	UP	UST	DLSU	UP		DLSU	UST
4th	UE	UP	AdU	UE	UE	ADMU	DLSU	DLSU	UE	UE		NU	FEU
5th	ADMU	UE	UE	FEU	FEU	UE	NU	UP		ADMU & FEU		AdU	UE
6th	FEU & NU	AdU	ADMU	AdU	DLSU	AdU	UE	ADMU		ADMU & FEU		ADMU	UP
7th	FEU & NU	NU		NU	ADMU			AdU					
8th	AdU			ADMU	NU								

Women's
Rank	Basketball	Volleyball	Swimming	Table tennis	Badminton	Track and field	Fencing	Taekwondo	Judo	Softball	Football
1st	FEU	UST	DLSU	UP	UP	FEU	UP	UST	UP	UP	FEU
2nd	DLSU	FEU	UP	FEU	ADMU	UST	ADMU	DLSU		AdU	ADMU
3rd	UST	UP	UST	DLSU	DLSU	DLSU	DLSU	UP		DLSU	DLSU
4th	UP	UE	ADMU	UST	UST	UE		UE		UST	UST
5th	AdU	DLSU	AdU & UE	UE	UE	UP		ADMU		ADMU	UP
6th	UE	ADMU	AdU & UE	AdU	NU	AdU		FEU			
7th	ADMU	AdU		NU		ADMU					
8th		NU		ADMU							

=== Juniors' division championships ===
Rank	BOYS'						GIRLS'	
Rank	Basketball	Volleyball	Swimming	Chess	Table tennis	Track and field	Volleyball	Swimming
1st	USTHS	DLSZ	UST	ADMU	AdU & UE	ADMU	DLSZ	USTHS
2nd	ADMU	UE	DLSZ	UE	AdU & UE	AdU	UPIS	AdU
3rd	DLSZ	ADMU	ADMU	USTHS	NU	USTHS	USTHS	UE
4th	AdU	UPIS	UE	NU	USTHS	DLSZ	UE	DLSZ
5th	UE	NU	AdU	AdU	ADMU	UE & UPIS	NU	UPIS
6th	UPIS	USTHS	UPIS	DLSZ	UPIS	UE & UPIS		
7th	NU			FEU	DLSZ			
8th	FEU							

== Overall championship race ==
The host school is boldfaced. Final.

=== Juniors' division ===
Rank	School	Points
1st	USTHS	87
2nd	UE	77
3rd	**DLSZ**	74
4th	Ateneo	68
5th	Adamson	59
6th	UPIS	44
7th	NU	32
8th	FEU-FERN	3

=== Seniors' division ===
Rank	School	Points
1st	UST	254
2nd	UP	**233**
3rd	**La Salle**	225
4th	Ateneo	131
5th	FEU	**130**
6th	UE	**121**
7th	Adamson	**75**
8th	NU	**30**

Note for Seniors division: Point totals in italics are partial results. The results for the Men and Women's Judo tournaments, in which only Ateneo, La Salle, UP, and UST joined in, are incomplete. UP won both tournaments. Fencing is a demonstration sport, and is not included in the final tally.

=== Individual awards ===
Top Athletes:
Men: Herminio Gallo, Jr. (Volleyball)
Women: Emmilyn Ong Jimenez (Swimming)
Junior: Rufino Manotok (Swimming)
