= UAAP Season 63 =

Season of university sports in the Philippines

- "Recreating the Value of Friendship through Sports"
- Host school: University of Santo Tomas

Overall
- Seniors: University of Santo Tomas
- Juniors: Ateneo de Manila University

Seniors' champions
Sport		Men	Women
Basketball		La Salle	La Salle
Volleyball		FEU	FEU
Chess		La Salle	?
Table tennis		La Salle	UP
Taekwondo		UST	UST
Judo		UST	UP
Track and field		UE	UST
Fencing		UE	UP
Football		UP	FEU
Tennis		Ateneo	
Badminton		UP	UP
Baseball		UP	
Softball		N/A	Adamson
Swimming		La Salle	UST
- Cheerdance: UP (EX) (Ex - Coed)

Juniors' champions
Sport		Boys	Girls
Basketball		Ateneo	N/A
Volleyball		?	UE
Chess		Ateneo	
Table tennis		?	
Taekwondo		Ateneo	
Judo		Ateneo	
Track and field		?	?
- (NT) = No tournament; (DS) = Demonstration Sport; (Ex) = Exhibition;

UAAP Season 63 is the 2000–01 athletic year of the University Athletic Association of the Philippines (UAAP), which was hosted by the University of Santo Tomas. The season opened on July 15, 2000, at the Araneta Coliseum.

ABS-CBN Sports took over the league's TV coverage beginning this season after winning the TV rights over previous broadcaster Silverstar Communications.

== Basketball ==
=== Men's tournament ===
==== Elimination round ====
Pos	Team	W	L	PCT	GB	Qualification
1	De La Salle Green Archers	12	2	.857	—	Twice-to-beat in the semifinals
2	Ateneo Blue Eagles	11	3	.786	1	Twice-to-beat in the semifinals
3	FEU Tamaraws	9	5	.643	3	Twice-to-win in the semifinals
4	UST Growling Tigers (H)	8	6	.571 (Note: Fourth-seed playoff: UST 65–61 UE)	4	Twice-to-win in the semifinals
5	UE Red Warriors	8	6	.571	4	
6	UP Fighting Maroons	4	10	.286	8	
7	NU Bulldogs	4	10	.286	8	
8	Adamson Falcons	0	14	.000	12	

(H) Hosts

==== Playoffs ====
Semifinals (Nos. 1 & 2 have twice-to-beat advantage)
1	La Salle	65
4	UST	62
2	Ateneo	60	67
3	FEU	61	75

Finals (Best-of-three series)
1	La Salle	67	74
3	FEU	64	65

== Overall championship race ==
=== Juniors' division ===
Rank	Team	Points
1	Ateneo	0
1	UE	0
1	UST (H)	0
1	DLSZ	0
1	UPIS	0
1	Adamson	0
1	NU	0

(H) Season host.
Notes: Results are final.

=== Seniors' division ===
Rank	Team	Points
1	UST (H)	199
2	UP	173
3	La Salle	159
4	FEU	0
4	UE	0
4	Adamson	0
4	Ateneo	0
4	NU	0

(H) Season host.
Notes: Results are final.

== Broadcast notes ==
Season 63 would be the first season under the UAAP's new broadcast contract with ABS-CBN Sports. Games were aired through their UHF channel Studio 23, together with the games of ABS-CBN's professional league, the Metropolitan Basketball Association.

== See also ==
- NCAA Season 76
