= UAAP Season 57 =

University athletic year

- Host school: National University

Overall
- Seniors: University of Santo Tomas
- Juniors: None

Seniors' champions
Sport		Men	Women
Basketball		UST	UST

Juniors' champions
Sport		Boys	Girls
Basketball		UST	N/A
- (NT) = No tournament; (DS) = Demonstration Sport; (Ex) = Exhibition;

UAAP Season 57 is the 1994–95 athletic year of the University Athletic Association of the Philippines (UAAP), which was hosted by the National University.

The season opened on July 16, 1994 at the Araneta Coliseum. Only seven teams showed up as Adamson University was under a one-year ban because of the Marlou Aquino academic controversy.

== Basketball ==
=== Men's basketball ===
==== Elimination round ====
Pos	Team	W	L	Pts	Qualification
1	De La Salle Green Archers	10	2	22	Twice-to-beat in the semifinals
2	UE Red Warriors	9	3	21	Twice-to-beat in the semifinals
3	UST Growling Tigers	8	4	20	Twice-to-win in the semifinals
4	FEU Tamaraws	7	5	19	Twice-to-win in the semifinals
5	UP Fighting Maroons	4	8	16 (Note: Head-to-head record: UP 2–0 Ateneo)	
6	Ateneo Blue Eagles	4	8	16	
7	NU Bulldogs (H)	0	12	12	

Source: Manila Standard
Rules for classification: 1) winning percentage; 2) if tied for #2 or #4, one-game playoff; 3) head-to-head record; 4) head-to-head point differential; 5) overall point differential
(H) Hosts

==== Playoffs ====
Semifinals (Nos. 1 & 2 have twice-to-beat advantage)
1	La Salle	65
4	FEU	63
2	UE	81	74
3	UST	88	83

Finals (Best-of-three series)
1	La Salle	77	75	76
3	UST	74	89	77

September 17

recap

De La Salle Green Archers	65–63	FEU Tamaraws

Cuneta Astrodome, Pasay

September 17

UE Red Warriors	81–88	UST Growling Tigers

Cuneta Astrodome, Pasay

September 21

recap

UE Red Warriors	74–83	UST Growling Tigers

Loyola Center, Quezon City
