= UAAP Season 60 =

- Host school: Adamson University

Overall
- Seniors: University of the Philippines Diliman
- Juniors: University of Santo Tomas

Seniors' champions
Sport		Men	Women
Basketball		FEU	FEU
Volleyball		FEU	UST
Football		La Salle	FEU
Baseball		Adamson	N/A
Softball		N/A	Adamson
Swimming		UP	UP
Badminton		UP	UP
Chess		UST	?
Judo		UST	UP
Table tennis		La Salle	UP
Tennis		UP	
Track and field		UE	FEU
Taekwondo		UST	UST
- Cheerdance: no competition (Ex - Coed)

Juniors' champions
Sport		Boys	Girls
Basketball		FEU	N/A
Volleyball		La Salle	La Salle
Football		?	?
Baseball		Ateneo	
Softball		?	
Swimming		Ateneo	
- (NT) = No tournament; (DS) = Demonstration Sport; (Ex) = Exhibition;

UAAP Season 60 is the 1997–98 athletic year of the University Athletic Association of the Philippines (UAAP), which was hosted by Adamson University.

== Basketball ==
=== Men's tournament ===
==== Elimination round ====
Pos	Team	W	L	Pts	Qualification
1	FEU Tamaraws	11	3	25	Twice-to-beat in the semifinals
2	UST Growling Tigers	10	4	24 (Note: Head-to-head record: UST 1-1 La Salle; UST +5)	Twice-to-beat in the semifinals
3	De La Salle Green Archers	10	4	24	Twice-to-win in the semifinals
4	UP Fighting Maroons	8	6	22	Twice-to-win in the semifinals
5	UE Red Warriors	6	8	20	
6	Ateneo Blue Eagles	4	10	18	
7	Adamson Falcons (H)	4	10	18	
8	NU Bulldogs	3	11	17	

Source: Manila Standard via Google News
(H) Hosts

==== Playoffs ====
Semifinals (Nos. 1 & 2 have twice-to-beat advantage)
1	FEU	69	70
4	UP	70	69
2	UST	73	72
3	La Salle	82	74

Finals (Best-of-three series)
1	FEU	62	65
3	La Salle	60	64

== Overall championship race ==
The host school is boldfaced. Final.

=== Juniors' division ===
Rank	School	Points
1st	USTHS	-
2nd	-	-
3rd	-	-
4th	-	-
5th	-	-
6th	-	-
7th	-	-
8th	-	-

=== Seniors' division ===
Rank	School	Points
1st	UP	-
2nd	UST	-
3rd	-	-
4th	-	-
5th	-	-
6th	-	-
7th	-	-
8th	-	-
