= UAAP Season 51 men's basketball tournament =

Basketball competition in the Philippines

1988 UAAP season
- Host school: De La Salle University
Men's Finals	G1	Wins
Ateneo Blue Eagles	76	1+1
De La Salle Green Archers	70	0
- Duration: October 7, 1988
- Arena(s): Rizal Memorial Coliseum
- Winning coach: Fritz Gaston
- TV network(s): IBC, PTV

The 1988 UAAP men's basketball tournament was the 51st year of the men's tournament of the University Athletic Association of the Philippines (UAAP)'s basketball championship. Hosted by De La Salle University, the Ateneo Blue Eagles defeated the De La Salle Green Archers in the finals defending their first UAAP men's basketball championship: it was the first UAAP finals series for the Ateneo–La Salle rivalry that originated in the NCAA (Philippines).

== Tournament format ==
- Double round robin; the two teams with the best records advance Finals:
  - The #1 seed will only need to win once to clinch the championship.
  - The #2 seed has to win twice to clinch the championship.

== Elimination round ==
Pos	Team	W	L	Pts	Qualification
1	Ateneo Blue Eagles	12	2	26	Twice-to-beat in the finals
2	De La Salle Green Archers (H)	11	3	25	Twice-to-win in the finals
3	UP Parrots	10	4	24	
4	Adamson Falcons	7	7	21	
5	UE Red Warriors	6	8	20	
6	FEU Tamaraws	5	9	19	
7	UST Glowing Goldies	3	11	17	
8	NU Bulldogs	2	12	16	

Rules for classification: 1) match points; 2) if tied for #2, one-game playoff; 3) head-to-head record; 4) head-to-head point differential; 5) overall point differential
(H) Hosts

Ateneo abandoned its game against the University of the Philippines (UP) with the Fighting Maroons leading 83–69 1:21 left in the game when a melee broke out involving Ateneo's Joseph Canlas and UP's Joseph Marata. The referees ejected Canlas after he tripped Marata, then the two players traded punches that led to a bench-clearing situation. An unidentified spectator fired a gun, who was escorted out of the Rizal Memorial Coliseum by UP baseball coach and police officer Boy Codiñera.

With the system currently in place, Ateneo would've forfeited the game and received no points (a loss under ordinary circumstances merited one point, two points for a win); however, Ateneo coach Fritz Gaston appealed the decision to the UAAP Board which was granted, ruling the game as an ordinary loss for Ateneo and giving them one point.

== Finals ==
Ateneo clinched the twice-to-beat advantage in the elimination round finale which served as a de facto Game 1 of a best-of-3 series with a win against La Salle.

PTV

October 7

Ateneo Blue Eagles	76–70	De La Salle Green Archers
Scoring by half: 42–33, 34–37
Ateneo wins series in one game

Rizal Memorial Coliseum, Manila

La Salle, led by Dindo Pumaren, had a ten-point advantage midway through the first half, 21–11. However, Ateneo caught up with them and kept the score close until the final deadlock at 66–all when Ateneo started an 8–2 run. Joseph Canlas scored four of Ateneo's eight points in the run, which ended with a Gilbert Reyes conversion off a steal from Joey Santa Maria. Pumaren closed the gap to four points at 74–70, with two free throws off Joseph Kenneth Nieto, but the Blue Eagles prevented further scoring opportunities for La Salle; Santa Maria fouled Daniel Francisco, who converted his two free-throws to give Ateneo the win, and a successful defense of their championship. Their back-to-back title run was their first successful title defense since the 1975 and 1976 NCAA seasons.

== See also ==
- NCAA Season 64 basketball tournaments

Preceded by Season 50 (1987)	UAAP basketball seasons Season 51 (1988)	Succeeded by Season 52 (1989)
