= UAAP Season 70 men's basketball tournament =

Basketball competition in the Philippines

UAAP Season 70
- Host school: University of Santo Tomas
Men's Finals	G1	G2	Wins
UE Red Warriors	63	64	0
De La Salle Green Archers	64	73	2
- Duration: October 4–7, 2007
- Arena: Araneta Coliseum
- Finals MVP: JVee Casio and Pocholo Villanueva (co-awardees)
- Winning coach: Franz Pumaren
- Semifinalists: Ateneo Blue Eagles; UST Growling Tigers
- TV networks: Studio 23 and TFC

The UAAP Season 70 men's basketball tournament is the flagship tournament of the University Athletic Association of the Philippines (UAAP) basketball championships.

The University of Santo Tomas (UST) is the season's host. The games began on July 7 at the Araneta Coliseum in Quezon City with the resurgent De La Salle Green Archers defeating the UP Fighting Maroons in the first game. La Salle, which was suspended on the previous tournament, went on to win the championship, sweeping the UE Red Warriors 2–0 in the Finals series. UE on the other hand, had the distinction of sweeping the double round eliminations 14–0, capped by a win against La Salle in overtime on their last elimination round game. JVee Casio and Pocholo Villanueva were awarded co-finals most valuable player honors, for leading La Salle to their seventh men's UAAP championship.

Jervy Cruz of UST, with his double-double statistics, is the most valuable player. JR Cawaling of the FEU Tamaraws is the rookie of the year.

== Preseason events ==
New coaches are Bogs Adornado for the Adamson Falcons (replacing Leo Austria who resigned to coach the Welcoat Dragons professional basketball team) and Glenn Capacio replacing Bert Flores as he became an FEU Tamaraws manager. De La Salle Green Archers coach Franz Pumaren, who had previously resigned after the PEPTCR scandal, was rehired by La Salle.

== Coaches ==
=== Current coaches ===
- Adamson Soaring Falcons – Bogs Adornado
- Ateneo Blue Eagles – Norman Black
- De La Salle Green Archers – Franz Pumaren
- FEU Tamaraws – Glenn Capacio
- NU Bulldogs – Manny Dandan
- UE Red Warriors – Dindo Pumaren
- UP Fighting Maroons – Joe Lipa
- UST Growling Tigers – Pido Jarencio

=== Coaching changes ===
Team	Outgoing coach	Replaced by
Adamson Soaring Falcons	Leo Austria	Bogs Adornado
FEU Tamaraws	Bert Flores	Glenn Capacio

== Elimination round ==
=== Team standings ===
Pos	Team	W	L	PCT	GB	Qualification
1	UE Red Warriors	14	0	1.000	—	Advance to the Finals (Note: As UE won all of their elimination round games, the stepladder format was used instead of the regular Final Four format.)
2	De La Salle Green Archers	9	5	.643 (Note: Second-seed playoff: La Salle 70–69 Ateneo)	5	Twice-to-beat in stepladder round 2
3	Ateneo Blue Eagles	9	5	.643	5	Stepladder round 1
4	UST Growling Tigers (H)	8	6	.571 (Note: Fourth-seed playoff: UST 80–69 FEU)	6	Stepladder round 1
5	FEU Tamaraws	8	6	.571	6	
6	NU Bulldogs	6	8	.429	8	
7	Adamson Soaring Falcons	2	12	.143	12	
8	UP Fighting Maroons	0	14	.000	14	

Source: ABS-CBN Sports
Rules for classification: 1) winning percentage; 2) if tied for #2 or #4, one-game playoff; 3) head-to-head record; 4) head-to-head point differential; 5) overall point differential
(H) Hosts

=== Match-up results ===
	Round 1							Round 2						
Team ╲ Game	1	2	3	4	5	6	7	8	9	10	11	12	13	14
Adamson	Ateneo school colors	La Salle school colors	UST school colors	FEU school colors	NU school colors	UP school colors	UE school colors	FEU school colors	La Salle school colors	UE school colors	Ateneo school colors	NU school colors	UST school colors	UP school colors
Ateneo	Adamson school colors	UP school colors	UE school colors	NU school colors	La Salle school colors	FEU school colors	UST school colors	UE school colors	FEU school colors	UST school colors	Adamson school colors	UP school colors	La Salle school colors	NU school colors
La Salle	UP school colors	Adamson school colors	FEU school colors	UE school colors	Ateneo school colors	UST school colors	NU school colors	UST school colors	FEU school colors	Adamson school colors	UP school colors	NU school colors	Ateneo school colors	UE school colors
FEU	NU school colors	UST school colors	La Salle school colors	Adamson school colors	Ateneo school colors	UE school colors	UP school colors	Adamson school colors	La Salle school colors	Ateneo school colors	UP school colors	UE school colors	NU school colors	UST school colors
NU	FEU school colors	UE school colors	UP school colors	Ateneo school colors	UST school colors	Adamson school colors	La Salle school colors	UP school colors	UE school colors	UST school colors	La Salle school colors	Adamson school colors	FEU school colors	Ateneo school colors
UE	UST school colors	NU school colors	Ateneo school colors	La Salle school colors	UP school colors	FEU school colors	Adamson school colors	Ateneo school colors	UST school colors	NU school colors	Adamson school colors	FEU school colors	UP school colors	La Salle school colors
UP	La Salle school colors	Ateneo school colors	NU school colors	UST school colors	UE school colors	Adamson school colors	FEU school colors	NU school colors	La Salle school colors	FEU school colors	UST school colors	Ateneo school colors	UE school colors	Adamson school colors
UST	UE school colors	FEU school colors	Adamson school colors	UP school colors	NU school colors	La Salle school colors	Ateneo school colors	La Salle school colors	UE school colors	NU school colors	Ateneo school colors	UP school colors	Adamson school colors	FEU school colors

= Win; = OT win; = Loss; = OT loss

=== Scores ===
Results on top and to the right of the dashes are for first-round games; those to the bottom and to the left of it are second-round games.

Teams	AdU	AdMU	DLSU	FEU	NU	UE	UP	UST
Adamson Soaring Falcons	—	63–69*	75–99	49–54	76–91	70–95	95–76	84–96
Ateneo Blue Eagles	81–68	—	80–77*	64–77	66–65	73–76	79–55	74–87
De La Salle Green Archers	75–55	87–89	—	64–61	85–81	76–96	82–61	90–86*
FEU Tamaraws	72–69	75–83	66–74	—	70–73*	60–89	87–82	81–66
NU Bulldogs	68–57	96–88*	64–78	70–72	—	75–82	86–79	72–83
UE Red Warriors	73–56	73–68	92–84*	79–72	70–66	—	97–66	73–60
UP Fighting Maroons	75–93	59–93	61–89	61–83	66–85	59–99	—	61–77
UST Growling Tigers	74–62	71–72	81–73*	73–84	84–72	82–99	76–68	—

Source: Philippine Daily Inquirer
Legend: Blue = left column team win; Red = top row team win.
Matches with lighter background shading were decided after overtime.

== Postseason teams ==
=== UE Red Warriors ===
After their heartbreaking semi-final loss against the UST Growling Tigers on 2006, the Warriors won several off-season tournaments, such as the Collegiate Champions League, where they beat the NCAA champions San Beda Red Lions.

On their first UAAP game, they beat the Tigers by a comfortable margin. UE then had to ward off NU in the endgame and survive Ateneo to remain unbeaten. In a game of unbeaten teams, the Warriors buried the Green Archers, as they broke the game wide open at the fourth quarter. UE then swept the first round with relatively easy wins against UP (31 points), FEU (29 points) and Adamson (25 points).

On their second round opener, the Warriors had to ward off the persistent Blue Eagles in the endgame to preserve their winning streak. UE then defeated UST, which had kept themselves in striking distance until the Red Warriors rallied in the fourth quarter. UE's closest win came against the Bulldogs which collapsed in the end game to lose by four points. UE then paraded with three more wins against Adamson, FEU and UP. UE has swept the eliminations by beating La Salle via overtime and advanced automatically to the Finals.

=== De La Salle Green Archers ===
Returning from suspension, La Salle had an easy opening day win against the UP Fighting Maroons. After another relatively easy win against Adamson, La Salle had a scare when FEU managed to hang on but were ultimately defeated. On their next game against UE, La Salle managed to fight tooth and nail but where overwhelmed by UE's accurate shooting in the second half as they were dealt with their first loss. La Salle was then defeated by Ateneo who rallied in overtime. La Salle then put the game in protest but was junked by the Technical Committee. On their next game, the Archers kept their 7-year winning streak against UST alive via another overtime game.

After finishing the first round with a win against the Bulldogs, the Archers had the win on their grasp but the Tigers had a 13–0 run in the last two minutes to force overtime. The Tigers prevailed in overtime to stop their seven-year losing streak against La Salle. The Green Archers then had a four-game winning streak to assure themselves of a place in the Final Four. However, with a twice to beat advantage a win away, archrivals Ateneo snapped La Salle's winning streak via a defensive stand to deny La Salle the shot within regulation.

Seeking to prevent a sweep, La Salle managed to keep away UE in their last elimination round game but UE mounted a furious comeback to force the game into overtime - La Salle actually had the opportunity to win the game but Rico Maierhoffer tapped the ball last when he stood unmolested under the basket. Clutch freethrows from Mark Borboran and disqualifications of La Salle's Maierhoffer and JV Casio due to fouling out kept La Salle from coming back and resulted to the first sweep of the men's tournament since 1993, when UST did it.

The game was marred when La Salle player Bryan Ilad punched Mark Fampulme at the back of the head after a hard foul of La Salle's Rico Maierhofer to Mark Borboran of UE during the first quarter. Ilad was ejected at the game and would be suspended for five games (details below). It was recommended by the UAAP board that Ilad would make a public apology to Fampulme, to UE and the UAAP Community.

=== Ateneo Blue Eagles ===
Ateneo opened the season with an overtime win against Adamson, then a blowout win against neighbors UP. In the battle of undefeated teams, UE held on to win by three points to deal the Eagles with their first loss. After a last-possession win against NU, Ateneo had a controversial win against archrival La Salle, in which La Salle protested when two Atenean foreigners played at the same time. The UAAP Technical Committee junked La Salle's protest, since American Kirk Long did not actually enter the playing court, hence did not affect the outcome of the game. However, Ateneo lost their next three games, against FEU including a game against last year's Finals opponent UST and UE in the start of the second-round.

Ateneo then rebounded with a five-game winning streak, including triumphs against FEU, Adamson, UST, where Kirk Long converted a walk-off buzzer beater, UP and archrivals La Salle where Chris Tiu converted a three-point shot in the dying seconds, and La Salle failed to convert a put-back within time limits.

=== UST Growling Tigers ===
The defending champions started the season with a 0–2 record, losing to UE and FEU. UST rebounded with wins against Adamson, UP and NU. Transferee Khasim Mirza made up for last year's Finals MVP Jojo Duncil's departure, with accurate three-point shooting. On a seven-year losing streak, La Salle had to win via overtime to break UST's streak. A win over last year's Finals opponent Ateneo assured the Tigers of an above-.500 record at the end of the first round.

On their rematch with the Green Archers, the Tigers forced overtime after coming up with a 13–0 run at the final two minutes of regulation. With a near-flawless game, Jervy Cruz led the team into victory, the first since 1999. With momentum on their side, the Tigers were humbled by a streaking UE Red Warriors, who staged their own rally at the fourth quarter to hold off any UST run. After a win against NU, the Tigers were beaten by Ateneo, thanks to Kirk Long's buzzer beater. Needing to win their last three games to assure of a Final Four berth, the Tigers made short work of doormats UP and Adamson, but were upended by FEU to force a deciding knockout game between the two to determine which team will advance to the playoffs.

== Fourth seed playoff ==
Studio 23

September 17
3:00 p.m.

FEU Tamaraws	69–80	UST Growling Tigers
Scoring by quarter: 19–17, 6–22, 18–24, 26–17
Pts: Reil Cervantes 17		Pts: Jervy Cruz 17
UST advances to the Final Four

Araneta Coliseum, Quezon City

Winning both of their elimination round games (81–66 at the Ninoy Aquino Stadium and 84–73 at the Araneta Coliseum), the Tamaraws forced the knockout game by winning their second-round game. FEU started rather well, leading by two points at the end of the first period. UST on the other hand, pulled away, with inside plays of Jervy Cruz and defense against the Tamaraws.

Leading by as much as 20 points, FEU managed to bring down to lead to 16 at the third quarter but the Tigers answered back, bringing it back to 20. On the fourth quarter, the Tams, thanks to three-point shooting by Paul Sanga, cut the lead into ten; they had run out of time however as the Tigers advanced to the playoffs to assure of defending their title for a little longer.

== Second seed playoff ==
Studio 23

September 18
3:00 p.m.

Ateneo Blue Eagles	69–70	De La Salle Green Archers
Scoring by quarter: 13–12, 19–16, 15–22, 22–20
Pts: Kirk Long 11; Rebs: Ford Arao 12; Asts: Jai Reyes 8		Pts: JV Casio 21; Rebs: Rico Maierhofer 12; Asts: TY Tang 3
La Salle wins the twice-to-beat advantage

Araneta Coliseum, Quezon City

== Bracket ==
Stepladder round 1 (Single-elimination)
3	Ateneo	69
4	UST	64

Stepladder round 2 (No. 2 twice-to-beat)
2	La Salle	64	65
3	Ateneo	65	60

Finals (Best-of-three playoff)
1	UE	63	64
2	La Salle	64	73

== Stepladder semifinals ==
=== First round ===
Studio 23

September 23
3:00 p.m.

Ateneo Blue Eagles	69–64	UST Growling Tigers
Scoring by quarter: 10–18, 22–12, 23–21, 14–13
Pts: Ford Arao 17; Rebs: Nonoy Baclao 8 Asts: Yuri Escueta 4		Pts: Jervy Cruz 17; Rebs: Jervy Cruz 16; Asts: Japs Cuan 5
Ateneo advances to the stepladder round 2

Araneta Coliseum, Quezon City

=== Second round ===
Studio 23

September 27
3:00 p.m.

De La Salle Green Archers	64–65	Ateneo Blue Eagles
Scoring by quarter: 16–15, 15–15, 21–17, 12–18
Pts: TY Tang 20; Rebs: Rico Maierhofer 7 Asts: JVee Casio 4		Pts: Ford Arao 19; Rebs: Nonoy Baclao 9 Asts: Chris Tiu 4

Araneta Coliseum, Quezon City
Attendance: 16,000

Studio 23

September 30
3:00 p.m.

De La Salle Green Archers	65–60	Ateneo Blue Eagles
Scoring by quarter: 16–14, 13–12, 19–17, 17-17
Pts: Pocholo Villanueva 13; Rebs: Rico Maierhofer 10; Asts: JVee Casio 6		Pts: Ford Arao 14; Rebs: Rabeh Al-Hussaini 8 Asts: Chris Tiu 4
La Salle wins series in two games

Araneta Coliseum, Quezon City
Attendance: 23,315

With La Salle having the twice to beat advantage, As both teams kept fluctuating exchanging leads and tying, eventually La Salle ending the first quarter leading by a point. However, Ateneo scored 7 consecutive points at the start of the 2nd quarter to lead by 6 points had a rally and led by as much as 4, La Salle care of JVee Casio scored five consecutive points in the final minute to maintain the lead going into halftime. On the third quarter, La Salle had a 5–0 run to lead by as much as seven by forcing Ateneo several turnovers (Ateneo wound up with 24 turnovers at the end of the game). Ateneo eventually cut the deficit into five points at the end of the third.

Ateneo continued on their momentum, tying the score thanks to a Nonoy Baclao tip-in. However, La Salle countered with their own 4–0 run with 5 minutes to go; Ateneo caught up with another Baclao tip-in and a three-point field goal by Chris Tiu to cut the deficit into one point. With half a minute remaining, La Salle turned over the ball, Tiu drove hard to the basket and made the shot, giving the lead to Ateneo. With seven seconds left, Casio drove to the basket and kicked out the ball to Bader Malabes; Malabes missed the jump shot, then Rico Maierhofer missed the tip-in as time expired.

La Salle beat the Eagles in the sold out Araneta Coliseum for their fifth and last encounter for the year to advance to the Finals. At the press conference after Game 2, La Salle coach Franz Pumaren said "I think it's the first time that two (wins) is greater than three (wins)," referencing Ateneo's three wins earlier in the elimination round and the first game of the second round series, against La Salle's two wins in its crucial moments (playoff for the second-seed and the twice-to-beat advantage and the sudden death match in the right to face UE in the Finals).

== Finals ==
Last championship matchup: 1990 season (UAAP Season 53)—La Salle 78–74 UE (La Salle had the twice-to-beat advantage)

Studio 23

October 4
3:00 p.m.

UE Red Warriors	63–64	De La Salle Green Archers
Scoring by quarter: 21–14, 18–23, 11–10, 13–17
Pts: Mark Borboran 13; Rebs: Hans Thiele 16; Asts: Arellano, Cañizares 3 each Team TOs: 30		Pts: TY Tang 17; Rebs: Rico Maierhofer 9 Asts: Villanueva, Maierhofer 3 each Bench/starter pts: 26/38

Araneta Coliseum, Quezon City
Attendance: 16,000

Studio 23

October 7
3:00 p.m.

UE Red Warriors	64–73	De La Salle Green Archers
Scoring by quarter: 11–15, 12–19, 22–19, 19–21
Pts: Borboran, Lee 12 each Rebs: Borboran, Gregorio 10 each Asts: 3 players 3 each Team TOs: 21		Pts: JVee Casio 17; Rebs: Rico Maierhofer 11; Asts: Pocholo Villanueva 6 FTs: 27/36 (75%)
La Salle wins series 2–0

Araneta Coliseum, Quezon City
Attendance: 18,067

- Finals Most Valuable Player: co-awardees, JV Casio and Pocholo Villanueva (De La Salle Green Archers)

UE started out firing on all cylinders, leading as much as seven in the first few minutes of the ball game; however, De La Salle was able to recover and tie the game at 8 apiece, the only deadlock in the game. La Salle eventually took the lead and never looked back for the rest of the game en route to their seventh UAAP men's basketball championship (excluding the 2004 title).

UE, rusty from a three-week layoff, started strong, having an 11–0 run to close the first quarter leading, 21–14. La Salle battled back to trail by two points at halftime. La Salle maintained the status quo at the third quarter.

The Archers tied the ballgame 58-all with four minutes left; La Salle then overtook the Warriors 63–60 at the last minute. UE's Mark Borboran scored a three-point field goal to tie once again the score, 63-all, with 34 seconds remaining. At ensuing La Salle offensive, Rico Maierhofer was fouled as he went up for an offensive rebound. Maierhofer converted one of his two free throws to put La Salle up by one, with 14.1 seconds left. Borboran then shot a three-pointer at the top of the key after a UE time-out but it bounced off the rim. Bader Malabes of La Salle rebounded the ball as time expired.

== Suspensions ==
- Brian Ilad of the De La Salle Green Archers was suspended for punching Mark Fampulme of the UE Red Warriors for five games. He served the first game against the Ateneo Blue Eagles; however, since La Salle can only have a maximum of four more games after the Ateneo game, Ilad is technically suspended for the rest of the season.

== Awards ==
UAAP Season 70 men's basketball champions
De La Salle Green Archers
Seventh title

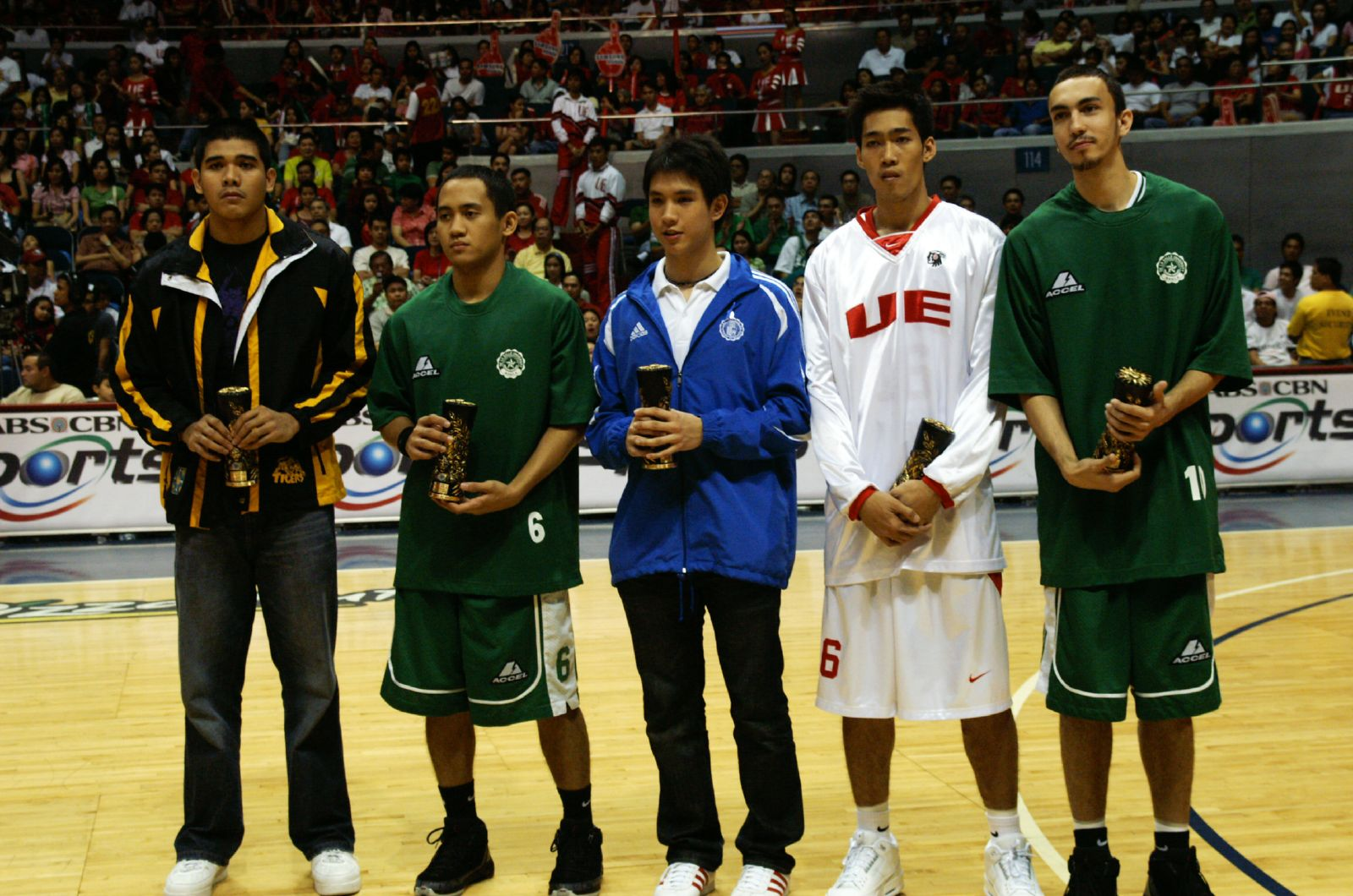
UAAP Season 70's mythical team for men's basketball: Jervy Cruz, JVee Casio, Chris Tiu (represented by his brother Charles), Mark Borboran and Rico Maierhofer.

The awards were given before Game 2 at the Araneta Coliseum, except for the Finals MVP award which was given after Game 2.

- Most Valuable Player: Jervy Cruz (UST Growling Tigers)
- Rookie of the Year: JR Cawaling (FEU Tamaraws)
- Defensive Player of the Year: Edwin Asoro (NU Bulldogs)
- Mythical Five:
  - Chris Tiu (Ateneo Blue Eagles)
  - JV Casio (De La Salle Green Archers)
  - Mark Borboran (UE Red Warriors)
  - Rico Maierhofer (De La Salle Green Archers)
  - Jervy Cruz (UST Growling Tigers)
- PSBank Maasahan (Dependable) Award: Jervy Cruz (UST Growling Tigers)
- KFC Assist Delivery Award: Japs Cuan (UST Growling Tigers)
- Smart Defensive Player of the Year: Edwin Asoro (NU Bulldogs)

Preceded by Season 69 (2006)	UAAP men's basketball seasons Season 70 (2007) basketball	Succeeded by Season 71 (2008)
