= UAAP basketball championships =

Universities' tournament in the Philippines

- Sport: Basketball
- Founded: 1938
- No. of teams: 8 (men's, women's, boys'); 4 (girls')
- Most recent champions: Men's – La Salle (2025); Women's – UST (2025); Boys' – UST (2025); Girls' – UST (2025); Junior high school – UE (2024)
- Most titles: Overall – UST (43); Men's – FEU (20); Women's – UST (12); Boys' – Ateneo (19); Girls' – UST (2); Junior high school – UE and NUNS (1)

The UAAP basketball championships are basketball tournaments held from September to December by the University Athletic Association of the Philippines, and the men's tournament is the flagship tournament of the UAAP. Basketball is a mandatory sport for all schools. All eight universities participate in the men's, women's, and high school (boys') tournaments.

== History ==
The tournament is divided into two divisions, the collegiate (formerly seniors') division, which is further subdivided into the men's and the women's tournament, and the high school (formerly juniors'), which is subdivided into boys' and girls' tournaments.

The UAAP basketball sport has a rich history of schools establishing dynasties. UE won a record seven consecutive basketball titles from 1965 to 1971 albeit the third one was a shared championship with UST. Ateneo had a 5-year winning streak from 2008 to 2012. Two other schools ended their championship streak at four. UST won it from 1993 to 1996 and La Salle from 1998 to 2001.

The championship in basketball, with its major overall points contribution to the annual UAAP general championship tallies, is one of the most coveted titles. The boys' tournament was called the "juniors' tournament" prior to 2019. The tournament was held concurrently with the seniors' tournaments in the first semester of the academic year (July to October), until 2014, when it was moved to the second semester (November to March).

== Tournament format ==
=== Pre-first expansion format ===
Before the UAAP's first expansion, teams would play a single round robin where the team with the best record would be crowned champions. If two or more teams are tied, they would be declared co-champions. No quotient system or knockout games were used to break ties.

=== First expansion format ===
Teams play a double round robin in a split season format. The winner of the first round play the winner of the second round in a 1-game championship to determine the champion. Ties for round winners are broken by knockout games.

If a team wins both rounds, it is automatically declared the champion, regardless if it was a sweep or not. If a team fails to win either rounds, but ends up with a better over-all record than either of the round winners, that team will challenge the second round winner for a championship slot against the first round winner.

=== Second and third expansion format ===
Teams play a double round robin. The top two teams (over-all record) after the double round robin play in the Finals with the No. 1 seed holding a one-win advantage in a best-of-three series. If a team sweeps the double round robin, they are automatically declared champions.

=== Final four format ===
The tournament currently uses the Final Four format, first implemented in 1993. The Tournament begins with a double round-robin elimination, where a team plays the other teams twice to determine which teams will qualify for the semi-finals (also called Final Four). The top four finishers enter the Final Four phase.

=== Sweeper's advantage ===
Previously, if a team sweeps the double round robin, they are automatically declared champions. However, after UST's sweep in 1993, it was modified so that the sweeping team would automatically qualify for the best-of-three Finals. After UE swept their way to the Finals in 2007, it was again modified so that the sweeping team would now automatically qualify for a best-of-five Finals, holding a 1–0 game advantage.

=== Regular final four ===
If no team sweeps the double round eliminations, the four top teams (and tiebreakers, if applicable) qualify for the regular postseason.

The regular post-season is divided into the semi-finals (also called the Final Four) and the Finals. In the semi-Finals, the two top seeds (Nos. 1 & 2) have a twice-to-beat advantage against the lower seeds (Nos. 3 & 4).

The surviving teams face off in a best-of-three finals, where the team which notches two wins first wins the championship.

=== Step ladder final four ===
From 2008 to 2015, if a team wins all of the games in the elimination round, the step ladder format is used, where the unbeaten team has a bye up to the best-of-5 finals holding a 1–0 game advantage. The third and fourth seed will figure in a knockout game; the winner of that game will face the second seed with a twice-to-win disadvantage. The surviving team meets the first seed at the Finals. The format was modified in 2016, where the unbeaten team proceeds to the best-of-3 finals without any playoff advantage, but the knockout games in all of the three semifinal seeds remain in place.

== List of basketball champions ==
Key
| Indicator | Meaning |
|---|---|
| | School won the championship in all divisions in the same year |
| | School won double or triple (but not all) championship in the same year |
| (No.) | Number of titles |
| (D.S.) | Held as a demonstration sport |

=== Early years ===
The foundation of the UAAP by FEU, NU, UP and UST in 1938.

| Season | Year | Men's | Women's | Juniors' |
|---|---|---|---|---|
| 1 | 1938–39 | Far Eastern University (1) | No tournament | No tournament |
| 2 | 1939–40 | Far Eastern University (2); University of the Philippines (1); University of Santo Tomas (1) | No tournament | No tournament |
| 3 | 1940–41 | University of Santo Tomas (2) | No tournament | No tournament |
| 4 | 1941–42 | Not held due to World War II. | | |
| 5 | 1942–43 | Not held due to World War II. | | |
| 6 | 1943–44 | Not held due to World War II. | | |
| 7 | 1944–45 | Not held due to World War II. | | |
| 8 | 1945–46 | Not held due to World War II. | | |
| 9 | 1946–47 | University of Santo Tomas (3) | No tournament | No tournament |
| 10 | 1947–48 | Far Eastern University (3); University of Santo Tomas (4) | No tournament | No tournament |
| 11 | 1948–49 | University of Santo Tomas (5) | No tournament | Far Eastern University (1) |
| 12 | 1949–50 | University of Santo Tomas (6) | No tournament | Far Eastern University (2) |
| 13 | 1950–51 | Far Eastern University (4) | Far Eastern University (1) | No tournament |
| 14 | 1951–52 | University of Santo Tomas (7) | Far Eastern University (2) | Far Eastern University (3) |

=== First expansion ===
Adamson University, Manila Central University, University of Manila and University of the East were admitted in 1952 on a two-year probationary membership status. Only UE and MCU retained as permanent member. However, MCU pulled-out in 1962. Adamson was readmitted into the association in 1970.

| Season | Year | Men's | Women's | Juniors' |
|---|---|---|---|---|
| 15 | 1952–53 | University of Santo Tomas (8) | Far Eastern University (3) | Far Eastern University (4) |
| 16 | 1953–54 | University of Santo Tomas (9) | Far Eastern University (4) | Far Eastern University (5) |
| 17 | 1954–55 | National University (1) | No tournament | University of Santo Tomas (1) |
| 18 | 1955–56 | University of Santo Tomas (10) | No tournament | |
| 19 | 1956–57 | Far Eastern University (5) | No tournament | |
| 20 | 1957–58 | University of the East (1) | No tournament | |
| 21 | 1958–59 | University of the East (2) | No tournament | |
| 22 | 1959–60 | University of Santo Tomas (11) | No tournament | |
| 23 | 1960–61 | University of the East (3) | No tournament | |
| 24 | 1961–62 | Far Eastern University (6) | No tournament | |
| 25 | 1962–63 | University of the East (4) | No tournament | |
| 26 | 1963–64 | University of the East (5) | No tournament | National University (1) |
| 27 | 1964–65 | University of Santo Tomas (12) | No tournament | |
| 28 | 1965–66 | University of the East (6) | No tournament | |
| 29 | 1966–67 | University of the East (7) | No tournament | |
| 30 | 1967–68 | University of the East (8); University of Santo Tomas (13) (Note: During the 1-game championship, the game was declared as a no contest prior to the third quarter as both coaches refused to issue to the officials their respective starting lineups for the third quarter. The UAAP Board later ruled the championship series as a tie and declared UE and UST as co-champions.) | No tournament | |
| 31 | 1968–69 | University of the East (9) | No tournament | |
| 32 | 1969–70 | University of the East (10) | No tournament | |
| 33 | 1970–71 | University of the East (11) | No tournament | University of Santo Tomas (?) |
| 34 | 1971–72 | University of the East (12) | No tournament | National University (2) |
| 35 | 1972–73 | Far Eastern University (7) | No tournament | University of the East (1) |
| 36 | 1973–74 | Far Eastern University (8) | No tournament | |
| 37 | 1974–75 | University of the East (13) | No tournament | National University (3) |
| 38 | 1975–76 | University of the East (14) | No tournament | Adamson University (1) |
| 39 | 1976–77 | Far Eastern University (9) | University of the Philippines Diliman (1) | |
| 40 | 1977–78 | Adamson University (1) | University of the Philippines Diliman (2) | Adamson University (2) |

=== Second expansion ===
Ateneo was accepted as a member in 1978.

| Season | Year | Men's | Women's | Juniors' |
|---|---|---|---|---|
| 41 | 1978–79 | University of the East (15) | University of the Philippines Diliman (3) | Ateneo de Manila University (1) |
| 42 | 1979–80 | Far Eastern University (10) | University of Santo Tomas (1) | Ateneo de Manila University (2) |
| 43 | 1980–81 | Far Eastern University (11) | University of the Philippines Diliman (4) | Ateneo de Manila University (3) |
| 44 | 1981–82 | Far Eastern University (12) | University of the Philippines Diliman (5) | University of the East (2) (Note: UE's juniors' division championship win was overturned after it was discovered that the team had over-aged players.) |
| 45 | 1982–83 | University of the East (16) | University of the Philippines Diliman (6) | University of Santo Tomas (7) (Note: Prior to 1980, the UST "Nuggets" had 6 UAAP Juniors titles.) (Note: Top seeded teams Adamson and UE's wins were forfeited after it was discovered that the teams had over-aged players.) |
| 46 | 1983–84 | Far Eastern University (13) | University of the Philippines Diliman (7) | Ateneo de Manila University (4) |
| 47 | 1984–85 | University of the East (17) | University of Santo Tomas (2) | Ateneo de Manila University (5) |
| 48 | 1985–86 | University of the East (18) | University of Santo Tomas (3) | Ateneo de Manila University (6) |

=== Third expansion ===
La Salle was accepted as a member in 1986.

| Season | Year | Men's | Women's | Juniors' |
|---|---|---|---|---|
| 49 | 1986–87 | University of the Philippines Diliman (2) | Adamson University (1) | Ateneo de Manila University (7) |
| 50 | 1987–88 | Ateneo de Manila University (1) | University of Santo Tomas (4) | Far Eastern University (6) |
| 51 | 1988–89 | Ateneo de Manila University (2) | University of Santo Tomas (5) | Adamson University (3) |
| 52 | 1989–90 | De La Salle University (1) | University of Santo Tomas (6) | Adamson University (4) |
| 53 | 1990–91 | De La Salle University (2) | University of Santo Tomas (7) | Adamson University (5) |
| 54 | 1991–92 | Far Eastern University (14) (Note: De La Salle, holding a twice-to-beat advantage in the finals, defeated FEU. DLSU had a player with 5 fouls within the game for a very brief period. The table officials had mistakenly allowed the player to stay in the court for less than 10 seconds. FEU protested the game within the prescribed period and a replay was ordered by the UAAP Board. FEU was given the title after De La Salle failed to appear on the replay date. The controversy was elevated to the FIBA and BAP which sided with La Salle. FEU needed to win one more game after this. However, the board's lack of organization decided to hand over the Tamaraws the controversial title.) | Far Eastern University (5) | Adamson University (6) |
| 55 | 1992–93 | Far Eastern University (15) | University of Santo Tomas (8) | Adamson University (7) |

=== Final Four era ===
Introduction of the Final Four format.

| Season | Year | Men's | Women's | Juniors' |
|---|---|---|---|---|
| 56 | 1993–94 | University of Santo Tomas (14) | Adamson University (2) | Adamson University (8) |
| 57 | 1994–95 | University of Santo Tomas (15) | University of Santo Tomas (9) | University of Santo Tomas (8) |
| 58 | 1995–96 | University of Santo Tomas (16) | University of Santo Tomas (10) | Ateneo de Manila University (8) |
| 59 | 1996–97 | University of Santo Tomas (17) | Far Eastern University (6) | University of Santo Tomas (9) |
| 60 | 1997–98 | Far Eastern University (16) | Far Eastern University (7) | Ateneo de Manila University (9) |
| 61 | 1998–99 | De La Salle University (3) | Far Eastern University (8) | University of Santo Tomas (10) |
| 62 | 1999–00 | De La Salle University (4) | De La Salle University (1) | Ateneo de Manila University (10) |
| 63 | 2000–01 | De La Salle University (5) | De La Salle University (2) | Ateneo de Manila University (11) |
| 64 | 2001–02 | De La Salle University (6) | De La Salle University (3) | University of Santo Tomas (11) |
| 65 | 2002–03 | Ateneo de Manila University (3) | De La Salle University (4) | UP Integrated School (1) |
| 66 | 2003–04 | Far Eastern University (17) | Adamson University (3) | Ateneo de Manila University (12) |
| 67 | 2004–05 | Far Eastern University (18) (Note: De La Salle admitted to have unknowingly fielded two ineligible players for the previous 3 years, from 2003–2005. However, the admission was made months after learning about the ineligibility. The UAAP Board forfeited their 2004–05 championship title and had to return their trophy. As a result, FEU was awarded the men's basketball championship for the 2004–05 season. De La Salle team standings from 2003–2005 were revoked and De La Salle was suspended in the 2006–07 season from all UAAP events.) | Adamson University (4) | Ateneo de Manila University (13) |
| 68 | 2005–06 | Far Eastern University (19) | Ateneo de Manila University (1) | De La Salle Zobel (1) |
| 69 | 2006–07 | University of Santo Tomas (18) | University of Santo Tomas (11) | Ateneo de Manila University (14) |
| 70 | 2007–08 | De La Salle University (7) | Ateneo de Manila University (2) | De La Salle Zobel (2) |
| 71 | 2008–09 | Ateneo de Manila University (4) | Far Eastern University (9) | Ateneo de Manila University (15) |
| 72 | 2009–10 | Ateneo de Manila University (5) | Adamson University (5) | Ateneo de Manila University (16) |
| 73 | 2010–11 | Ateneo de Manila University (6) | Adamson University (6) | Ateneo de Manila University (17) |
| 74 | 2011–12 | Ateneo de Manila University (7) | Far Eastern University (10) | National University (4) |
| 75 | 2012–13 | Ateneo de Manila University (8) | Far Eastern University (11) | Far Eastern University (7) |
| 76 | 2013–14 | De La Salle University (8) | De La Salle University (5) | National University (5) |
| 77 | 2014–15 | National University (2) | National University (1) | Ateneo de Manila University (18) |
| 78 | 2015–16 | Far Eastern University (20) | National University (2) | National University (6) |
| 79 | 2016–17 | De La Salle University (9) | National University (3) | Far Eastern University (8) |
| 80 | 2017–18 | Ateneo de Manila University (9) | National University (4) | Ateneo de Manila University (19) |
| 81 | 2018–19 | Ateneo de Manila University (10) | National University (5) | National University (7) |

==== Inclusivity era ====
In line with the association's commitment for inclusiveness, the tournament for girls' division was introduced in 2019, and a junior high school tournament was introduced in 2023. The tournament was renamed as the 16U boys' division in 2025, while the existing high school tournaments were renamed as 19U.

| Season | Year | Men's | Women's | 19U Boys' | 19U Girls' | 16U Boys' |
|---|---|---|---|---|---|---|
| 82 | 2019–20 | Ateneo de Manila University (11) | National University (6) | National University (8) | Adamson University (1); University of Santo Tomas (1) (D.S.) (Note: The UAAP Board decided to declare both Adamson and UST as co-champions after they decided to cancel the rest of the season due to the COVID-19 pandemic.) | No tournament |
| 83 | 2020–21 | No tournament | | | | No tournament |
| 84 | 2021–22 | University of the Philippines Diliman (3) | No tournament | | | No tournament |
| 85 | 2022–23 | Ateneo de Manila University (12) | National University (7) | Far Eastern University (9) | No tournament | No tournament |
| 86 | 2023–24 | De La Salle University (10) | University of Santo Tomas (12) | Adamson University (9) | No tournament | National University (1) (D.S.) |
| 87 | 2024–25 | University of the Philippines Diliman (4) | National University (8) | University of Santo Tomas (12) | University of Santo Tomas (2) | University of the East (1) |
| 88 | 2025–26 | De La Salle University (11) | University of Santo Tomas (13) | Far Eastern University (10) | University of Santo Tomas (3) | National University (2) |

== Number of championships by school ==
Including championships won when a tournament was a demonstration sport for Girls' and 16U tournament.

| University | Men's | Women's | Boys' | Girls' | 16U | Total |
|---|---|---|---|---|---|---|
| University of Santo Tomas | 18 | 13 | 12 (Note: Prior to 1980, the UST "Nuggets" had 6 UAAP Juniors titles.) | 3 | 0 | 46 |
| Far Eastern University | 20 (Note: FEU's totals includes disputed 1991 championship where De La Salle did not attend the replayed Game 1, and the disputed 2004 championship, where De La Salle forfeited the championship due to unknown fielding of ineligible players.) | 11 | 10 | 0 | 0 | 41 |
| Ateneo de Manila University | 12 | 2 | 19 | 0 | 0 | 33 |
| University of the East | 18 | 0 | 2 | 0 | 1 | 21 |
| National University | 2 | 8 | 8 | 0 | 2 | 20 |
| De La Salle University | 11 | 5 | 2 | 0 | 0 | 18 |
| Adamson University | 1 | 6 | 9 | 1 | 0 | 17 |
| University of the Philippines Diliman | 4 | 7 | 1 | 0 | 0 | 12 |
| University of Manila (Note: The team was not accepted as a regular member after its two-year probationary membership in the UAAP expired.) | 0 | 0 | 0 | 0 | 0 | 0 |
| Manila Central University (Note: MCU pulled-out of the association in 1962.) | 0 | 0 | 0 | 0 | 0 | 0 |

== Statistics ==
- Longest finals appearances

| Division | Team | Duration | |
| Division | Team | From | Until |
|---|---|---|---|
| Girls' | | | |
| Boys' | Ateneo de Manila University | Season 57 (1994) | Season 67 (2004) |
| Women's | University of Santo Tomas | Season 39 (1976) | Season 58 (1995) |
| Men's | University of the East | Season 20 (1957) | Season 35 (1972) |

- Longest finals match-ups between two teams

| Division | Teams | Duration | |
| Division | Teams | from | until |
|---|---|---|---|
| Girls' | | | |
| Boys' | Ateneo de Manila University, University of Santo Tomas | Season 57 (1994) | Season 64 (2001) |
| Women's | University of Santo Tomas, University of the Philippines | Season 39 (1976) | Season 48 (1985) |
| Men's | University of the East, University of Santo Tomas | Season 27 (1964) | Season 34 (1971) |

- Longest championship streaks

| Division | Team | Streak | Duration | |
| Division | Team | Streak | from | until |
|---|---|---|---|---|
| Men's | University of the East | 7 | Season 28 (1965) | Season 34 (1971) |

- Longest unshared championship streaks

| Division | Team | Streak | Duration | |
| Division | Team | Streak | from | until |
|---|---|---|---|---|
| Girls' | | | | |
| Boys' | Adamson University | 6 | Season 51 (1988) | Season 56 (1993) |
| Women's | National University | 7 | Season 77 (2014) | Season 85 (2022) |
| Men's | Ateneo de Manila University | 5 | Season 71 (2008) | Season 75 (2012) |

- Longest championship droughts

| Team | Juniors' | Women's | Men's |
|---|---|---|---|
| Adamson University | 33 years, since 1993 | 16 years, since 2010 | 49 years, since 1977 |
| Ateneo de Manila University | 8 years, since 2018 | 19 years, since 2007 | 4 years, since 2022 |
| De La Salle University | 19 years, since 2007 | 13 years, since 2013 | 10 years, since 2016 |
| Far Eastern University | 10 years, since 2016 | 14 years, since 2012 | 11 years, since 2015 |
| National University | 6 years, since 2020 | 12 years, since 2014 | 12 years, since 2014 |
| University of the East | 45 years, since 1981 | 74 years, since 1952 | 41 years, since 1985 |
| University of the Philippines | 24 years, since 2002 | 43 years, since 1983 | 5 years, since 2021 |
| University of Santo Tomas | 25 years, since 2001 | 20 years, since 2006 | 20 years, since 2006 |

- Elimination sweeps

| Division | Team | Season(s) |
|---|---|---|
| Girls' | | |
| Boys' | Ateneo de Manila University | Season 47 (1984), Season 49 (1986), Season 60 (1997), Season 62 (1999), Season 69 (2006), Season 73 (2010), Season 77 (2014), Season 80 (2017) |
| Boys' | National University | Season 76 (2013), Season 78 (2015) |
| Women's | De La Salle University | Season 65 (2002), Season 64 (2001) |
| Women's | Far Eastern University | Season 75 (2012) |
| Women's | National University | Season 77 (2014), Season 78 (2015), Season 79 (2016), Season 80 (2017), Season 81 (2018), Season 82 (2019) |
| Women's | University of Santo Tomas | Season 88 (2025) |
| Men's | Ateneo de Manila University | Season 82 (2019) |
| Men's | Far Eastern University | Season 43 (1980) |
| Men's | University of the East | Season 49 (1986), Season 70 (2007) |
| Men's | University of Santo Tomas | Season 56 (1993) |

The first ever sweep in UAAP basketball history was recorded by the FEU Tamaraws in 1980.

== Championship streaks ==
| * | Ongoing streak |

Men's tournament
| No. | School | Seasons |
|---|---|---|
| 7 | University of the East^{a} | 1965–66 to 1971–72 |
| 6 | University of Santo Tomas | 1939, 1940, 1946, 1947, 1948, 1949 |
| 5 | Ateneo de Manila University | 2008–09 to 2012–13 |
| 4 | De La Salle University | 1998–99 to 2001–02 |
| 4 | University of Santo Tomas | 1993–94 to 1996–97 |
| 4 | University of Santo Tomas | 1946–47 to 1949–50 |
| 3 | Ateneo de Manila University | 2017–18 to 2019–20 |
| 3 | Far Eastern University^{b} | 2003–04 to 2005–06 |
| 3 | Far Eastern University | 1979–80 to 1981–82 |
| 3 | University of Santo Tomas | 1951–52 to 1953–54 |
| 2 | Far Eastern University^{c} | 1991–92 to 1992–93 |
| 2 | De La Salle University | 1989–90 to 1990–91 |
| 2 | Ateneo de Manila University | 1987–88 to 1988–89 |
| 2 | University of the East | 1984–85 to 1985–86 |
| 2 | University of the East | 1974–75 to 1975–76 |
| 2 | Far Eastern University | 1972–73 to 1973–74 |
| 2 | University of the East | 1957–58 to 1958–59 |
| 2 | University of Santo Tomas | 1939–40 to 1940–41 |

Boys' tournament
| No. | School | Seasons |
|---|---|---|
| 6 | Adamson University | 1988–89 to 1993–94 |
| 6 | Far Eastern University | 1948–49 to 1953–54 |
| 4 | Ateneo de Manila University | 1983–84 to 1986–87 |
| 3 | Ateneo de Manila University | 2008–09 to 2010–11 |
| 3 | Ateneo de Manila University | 1978–79 to 1980–81 |
| 2 | National University | 2018–19 to 2019–20 |
| 2 | Ateneo de Manila University | 2003–04 to 2004–05 |
| 2 | Ateneo de Manila University | 1999–00 to 2000–01 |

Women's tournament
| No. | School | Seasons |
|---|---|---|
| 7 | National University | 2014–15 to 2022–23 |
| 6 | University of Santo Tomas | 1939–40 to 1949–50 |
| 4 | De La Salle University | 1999–00 to 2002–03 |
| 4 | University of Santo Tomas | 1987–88 to 1990–91 |
| 4 | University of the Philippines Diliman | 1980–81 to 1983–84 |
| 4 | Far Eastern University | 1950–51 to 1953–54 |
| 3 | Far Eastern University | 1996–97 to 1998–99 |
| 3 | University of the Philippines Diliman | 1976–77 to 1978–79 |
| 2 | Far Eastern University | 2011–12 to 2012–13 |
| 2 | Adamson University | 2009–10 to 2010–11 |
| 2 | Adamson University | 2003–04 to 2004–05 |
| 2 | University of Santo Tomas | 1994–95 to 1995–96 |

Notes

a. UE Red Warriors own the longest championship run in Seniors Basketball, with seven straight championships (including a shared title), from 1965 to 1971.
b. Includes the 2004 championship, where De La Salle forfeited the championship due to the fielding of ineligible players.
c. Includes the disputed 1991 championship where De La Salle did not show-up in the replay of Game 1.

== Final Four records ==
Women's basketball tournament
| University | Number of appearances | Last appearance | Finals appearances | Highest seed | Postseason record (W-L) |
|---|---|---|---|---|---|
| Adamson | 19 | 2013 | 12 | 1st | 25-16 (58.1%) |
| Ateneo | 6 | 2012 | 3 | 1st | 12-5 (70.6%) |
| De La Salle | 15 | 2013 | 6 | 1st | 15-18 (45.5%) |
| FEU | 15 | 2011 | 10 | 1st | 31-27 (53.4%) |
| NU | 1 | 2013 | 1 | 1st | —N/a |
| UE | — | — | — | — | — |
| UP | 13 | 2008 | 5 | 2nd | 11-16 (40.7%) |
| UST | 11 | 2013 | 2 | 1st | 11-16 (40.7%) |

Juniors' basketball tournament
| School | Number of appearances | Last appearance | Finals appearances | Highest seed | Postseason record (W-L) |
|---|---|---|---|---|---|
| Adamson | 13 | 2014 | 3 | 1st | 7-17 (29.2%) |
| Ateneo | 19* | 2016 | 17 | 1st | 48-21 (69.6%) |
| DLSZ | 15 | 2016 | 4 | 1st | 9-14 (39.1%) |
| FEU | 15 | 2018 | 5 | 1st | 9-11 (45.0%) |
| NU | 6^ | 2018 | 6 | 1st | 10-8 (55.6%) |
| UE | 1 | 2003 | — | 4th | 0-1 (0.00%) |
| UPIS | 6 | 2006 | 2 | 1st | 6-8 (42.9%) |
| UST | 13 | 2018 | 10 | 1st | 22-25 (46.8%) |

* Does not include 6 seasons (1997–98, 1999–2000, 2006–07, 2010–11, 2014–15 and 2017–18) where Ateneo swept the elimination round and automatically advanced to the Finals.

^ Does not include 2 seasons (2013–14 and 2015–16) where NU swept the elimination round and automatically advanced to the Finals.

== Awards ==
=== Most Valuable Player ===
==== Men's tournament ====
| Season | Name | Nationality | Team |
|---|---|---|---|
| 1960 | Roehl Nadurata | Philippines | UE |
| 1961 | Joselino Roa | Philippines | FEU |
| 1963 | Valentino Rosabal | Philippines | UST |
| 1966 | Robert Jaworski | Philippines | UE |
| 1968 | Fort Acuña | Philippines | UP |
| 1969 | Garry Artajos | Philippines | UST |
| 1981 | Anthony Williams | United States | FEU |
| 1982 | Allan Caidic | Philippines | UE |
| 1983 | Glenn Capacio | Philippines | FEU |
| 1984 | Allan Caidic | Philippines | UE |
| 1985 | Allan Caidic | Philippines | UE |
| 1986 | Eric Altamirano | Philippines | UP |
| 1987 | Jun Reyes | Philippines | Ateneo |
| 1988 | Jun Reyes | Philippines | Ateneo |
| 1989 | Jun Limpot | Philippines | La Salle |
| 1990 | Jun Limpot | Philippines | La Salle |
| 1991 | Johnny Abarrientos | Philippines | FEU |
| 1992 | Jun Limpot | Philippines | La Salle |
| 1993 | Dennis Espino | Philippines | UST |
| 1994 | Dennis Espino | Philippines | UST |
| 1995 | Chris Cantonjos | Philippines | UST |
| 1996 | Mark Telan | Philippines | La Salle |
| 1997 | Mark Telan | Philippines | La Salle |
| 1998 | Don Allado | Philippines | La Salle |
| 1999 | Don Allado | Philippines | La Salle |
| 2000 | Rich Alvarez | Philippines | Ateneo |
| 2001 | Rich Alvarez | Philippines | Ateneo |
| 2002 | Enrico Villanueva | Philippines | Ateneo |
| 2003 | James Yap | Philippines | UE |
| 2004 | Arwind Santos | Philippines | FEU |
| 2005 | Arwind Santos | Philippines | FEU |
| 2006 | Ken Bono | Philippines | Adamson |
| 2007 | Jervy Cruz | Philippines | UST |
| 2008 | Rabeh Al-Hussaini | Philippines | Ateneo |
| 2009 | Dylan Ababou | Philippines | UST |
| 2010 | RR Garcia | Philippines | FEU |
| 2011 | Bobby Ray Parks Jr. | Philippines | NU |
| 2012 | Bobby Ray Parks Jr. | Philippines | NU |
| 2013 | Terrence Romeo | Philippines | FEU |
| 2014 | Kiefer Ravena | Philippines | Ateneo |
| 2015 | Kiefer Ravena | Philippines | Ateneo |
| 2016 | Ben Mbala | Cameroon | La Salle |
| 2017 | Ben Mbala | Cameroon | La Salle |
| 2018 | Bright Akhuetie | Nigeria | UP |
| 2019 | Chabi Yo | Benin | UST |
| 2020 (Note: Season cancelled due to the COVID-19 pandemic.) | No tournament held | | |
| 2021 (Note: Season postponed to early 2022 due to the COVID-19 pandemic.) | Ange Kouame | Ivory Coast | Ateneo |
| 2022 | Malick Diouf | Senegal | UP |
| 2023 | Kevin Quiambao | Philippines | La Salle |
| 2024 | Kevin Quiambao | Philippines | La Salle |
| 2025 | Janrey Pasaol | Philippines | FEU |

==== Women's tournament ====
| Season | Name | Nationality | Team |
|---|---|---|---|
| 1999 | Che Lubiano | Philippines | UP |
| 2000 | Minerva Narciza | Philippines | Adamson |
| 2001 | Roussel Ocampo | Philippines | La Salle |
| 2002 | Minerva Narciza | Philippines | Adamson |
| 2003 | Dorothy Torres | Philippines | Adamson |
| 2004 | Merenciana Arayi | Philippines | Adamson |
| 2005 | Kristine Prado | Philippines | La Salle |
| 2006 | Cassie Tioseco | Philippines | Ateneo |
| 2007 | Cassie Tioseco | Philippines | Ateneo |
| 2008 | Marichu Bacaro | Philippines | UST |
| 2009 | Analyn Almazan | Philippines | Adamson |
| 2010 | Analyn Almazan | Philippines | Adamson |
| 2011 | Raiza Palmera | Philippines | FEU |
| 2012 | Allana May Lim | Philippines | FEU |
| 2013 | Camille Sambile | Philippines | FEU |
| 2014 | Afril Bernardino | Philippines | NU |
| 2015 | Afril Bernardino | Philippines | NU |
| 2016 | Afril Bernardino | Philippines | NU |
| 2017 | Jack Animam | Philippines | NU |
| 2018 | Grace Irebu | Congo | UST |
| 2019 | Grace Irebu | Congo | UST |
| 2020 | No tournament | | |
| 2021 | No tournament | | |
| 2022 | Eka Soriano | Philippines | UST |
| 2023 | Kacey Dela Rosa | Philippines | Ateneo |
| 2024 | Kacey Dela Rosa | Philippines | Ateneo |
| 2025 | Ann Pingol | Philippines | NU |

==== Boys' tournament ====
| Season | Name | Nationality | Team |
|---|---|---|---|
| 1992 | Adrodan Santos | Philippines | Adamson |
| 1999 | Larry Fonacier | Philippines | Ateneo |
| 2000 | June Cortez | Philippines | UST |
| 2001 | June Cortez | Philippines | UST |
| 2002 | Marcy Arellano | Philippines | UE |
| 2003 | Ken Barracoso | Philippines | Ateneo |
| 2004 | Julius Porlaje | Philippines | UE |
| 2005 | Francis Maniego | Philippines | UPIS |
| 2006 | Bacon Austria | Philippines | Ateneo |
| 2007 | Samuel Marata | Philippines | UPIS |
| 2008 | Mark Juruena | Philippines | Adamson |
| 2009 | Terrence Romeo | Philippines | FEU–D |
| 2010 | Kevin Ferrer | Philippines | UST |
| 2011 | Jerie Pingoy | Philippines | FEU–D |
| 2012 | Jerie Pingoy | Philippines | FEU–D |
| 2013 | Thirdy Ravena | Philippines | Ateneo |
| 2015 | Mike Nieto | Philippines | Ateneo |
| 2016 | Aljun Melecio | Philippines | DLSZ |
| 2017 | Juan Gomez de Liaño | Philippines | UPIS |
| 2018 | CJ Cansino | Philippines | UST |
| 2019 | Kai Sotto | Philippines | Ateneo |
| 2020 | Jake Figueroa | Philippines | Adamson |
| 2021 | No tournament held | | |
| 2022 | No tournament held | | |
| 2023 | Reinhard Jumamoy | Philippines | NUNS |
| 2024 | Collins Akowe | Cameroon | NUNS |
| 2025 | Kieffer Alas | Philippines | DLSZ |
| 2026 | Wilhalm Cabonilas | Philippines | FEU–D |

==== Girls tournament ====
| Season | Name | Nationality | Team |
|---|---|---|---|
| 2020 | Crisnalyn Padilla | Philippines | Adamson |
| 2021 | No tournament held | | |
| 2022 | No tournament held | | |
| 2023 | No tournament held | | |
| 2024 | No tournament held | | |
| 2025 | Barby Dajao | Philippines | UST |
| 2026 | Riri Perez | Philippines | UST |

=== Finals MVP ===
==== Men's tournament ====
| Season | Name | Nationality | Team |
|---|---|---|---|
| 1983 | Glenn Capacio | Philippines | FEU |
| 1992 | Nestor Echano | Philippines | FEU |
| 1999 | Don Allado | Philippines | La Salle |
| 2000 | | | |
| 2001 | Ren-Ren Ritualo | Philippines | La Salle |
| 2002 | Larry Fonacier (Note: Co-winners) | Philippines | Ateneo |
| 2002 | Wesley Gonzales | Philippines | Ateneo |
| 2003 | Arwind Santos | Philippines | FEU |
| 2004 | Mark Cardona | Philippines | La Salle |
| 2005 | Arwind Santos | Philippines | FEU |
| 2006 | Jojo Duncil | Philippines | UST |
| 2007 | JV Casio | Philippines | La Salle |
| 2007 | Pocholo Villanueva | Philippines | La Salle |
| 2008 | Nonoy Baclao | Philippines | Ateneo |
| 2009 | Rabeh Al-Hussaini | Philippines | Ateneo |
| 2010 | Ryan Buenafe | Philippines | Ateneo |
| 2011 | Nico Salva | Philippines | Ateneo |
| 2012 | Nico Salva | Philippines | Ateneo |
| 2013 | Jeron Teng | Philippines | La Salle |
| 2014 | Alfred Aroga | Cameroon | NU |
| 2015 | Mac Belo | Philippines | FEU |
| 2016 | Jeron Teng | Philippines | La Salle |
| 2017 | Thirdy Ravena | Philippines | Ateneo |
| 2018 | Thirdy Ravena | Philippines | Ateneo |
| 2019 | Thirdy Ravena | Philippines | Ateneo |
| 2020 | No tournament | | |
| 2021 | Malick Diouf | Senegal | UP |
| 2022 | Ange Kouame | Philippines | Ateneo |
| 2023 | Kevin Quiambao | Philippines | La Salle |
| 2024 | JD Cagulangan | Philippines | UP |
| 2025 | Michael Phillips | Philippines | La Salle |

==== Women's tournament ====
| Season | Name | Nationality | Team |
|---|---|---|---|
| 2001 | Regina Velarde | Philippines | La Salle |
| 2002 | Regina Velarde | Philippines | La Salle |
| 2003 | | | |
| 2004 | | | |
| 2005 | Cassie Tioseco | Philippines | Ateneo |
| 2006 | Charmaine Canuel | Philippines | UST |
| 2007 | Katrina Quimpo | Philippines | Ateneo |
| 2008 | Bernadette Mercado | Philippines | FEU |
| 2009 | Amby Almazan | Philippines | Adamson |
| 2010 | Amby Almazan | Philippines | Adamson |
| 2011 | Allana May Lim | Philippines | FEU |
| 2012 | Marilourd Borja | Philippines | FEU |
| 2013 | Trisha Piatos | Philippines | La Salle |
| 2014 | Gemma Miranda | Philippines | NU |
| 2015 | Afril Bernardino | Philippines | NU |
| 2016 | Gemma Miranda | Philippines | NU |
| 2017 | Trixie Antiquera | Philippines | NU |
| 2018 | Jack Animam | Philippines | NU |
| 2019 | Monique del Carmen | Philippines | NU |
| 2020 | No tournament held | | |
| 2021 | No tournament held | | |
| 2022 | Kristine Cayabyab | Philippines | NU |
| 2023 | Reynalyn Ferrer | Philippines | UST |
| 2024 | Cielo Pagdulagan | Philippines | NU |
| 2025 | Kent Pastrana | Philippines | UST |

==== Boys' tournament ====
| Season | Name | Nationality | Team |
|---|---|---|---|
| 2002 | Marvin Cruz | Philippines | UPIS |
| 2003 | Mark Intal | Philippines | Ateneo |
| 2004 | Jai Reyes | Philippines | Ateneo |
| 2005 | Simon Atkins | Philippines | DLSZ |
| 2006 | Mike Gamboa | Philippines | Ateneo |
| 2007 | Joshua Webb | Philippines | DLSZ |
| 2008 | Jayvee Dumrique | Philippines | Ateneo |
| 2009 | Kiefer Ravena | Philippines | Ateneo |
| 2010 | Kiefer Ravena | Philippines | Ateneo |
| 2011 | Ralph Atangan | Philippines | NSNU |
| 2012 | Roger Domingo | Philippines | FEU–D |
| 2013 | Hubert Cani | Philippines | NSNU |
| 2015 | Jolo Mendoza | Philippines | Ateneo |
| 2016 | Justine Baltazar | Philippines | NSNU |
| 2017 | Ljay Gonzales | Philippines | FEU–D |
| 2018 | Kai Sotto | Philippines | Ateneo |
| 2019 | Carl Tamayo | Philippines | NSNU |
| 2020 | Carl Tamayo | Philippines | NSNU |
| 2021 | No tournament | | |
| 2022 | No tournament | | |
| 2023 | Kirby Mongcopa | Philippines | FEU–D |
| 2024 | Mark Esperanza | Philippines | Adamson |
| 2025 | Racine Kane | Senegal | UST |
| 2026 | Wilhalm Cabonilas | Philippines | FEU–D |

=== Rookie of the Year ===
Prior to 2005, all players playing in their first year (including transfers and those elevated from "team B") are eligible for the award.

In Season 68, the rule covering the collegiate division was changed. Only fresh high school graduates are eligible. The exception was in UAAP Season 85 when those enrolled in 2021, along with those enrolled in 2022 or fresh high school graduates, are eligible for the award at the collegiate level. Similarly, in the same season, adjustments were also implemented in the high school division where only those aged 17 and below will be eligible for the same award.

==== Men's tournament ====
| Season | Name | Nationality | Team |
|---|---|---|---|
| 1961 | Valentino Rosabal | Philippines | UST |
| 1964 | Robert Jaworski | Philippines | UE |
| 1983 | Eric Altamirano | Philippines | UP |
| 1989 | Johnny Abarrientos | Philippines | FEU |
| 1991 | Paul Du | Philippines | UP |
| 1993 | Mark Telan | Philippines | La Salle |
| 1994 | Bobby Diloy | Philippines | UE |
| 1995 | Gerard Francisco | Philippines | UST |
| 1996 | Mark Victoria | Philippines | FEU |
| 1997 | Ren-Ren Ritualo | Philippines | La Salle |
| 1998 | Enrico Villanueva | Philippines | Ateneo |
| 1999 | Leo Avenido | Philippines | FEU |
| 2000 | Mike Cortez | Philippines | La Salle |
| 2001 | Mark Cardona | Philippines | La Salle |
| 2002 | Arwind Santos | Philippines | FEU |
| 2003 | JV Casio | Philippines | La Salle |
| 2004 | Marcy Arellano | Philippines | UE |
| 2005 | Jai Reyes | Philippines | Ateneo |
| 2006 | Woody Co | Philippines | UP |
| 2007 | JR Cawaling | Philippines | FEU |
| 2008 | Ryan Buenafe | Philippines | Ateneo |
| 2009 | Jeric Teng | Philippines | UST |
| 2010 | Terrence Romeo | Philippines | FEU |
| 2011 | Kiefer Ravena | Philippines | Ateneo |
| 2012 | Jeron Teng | Philippines | La Salle |
| 2013 | Kyles Jefferson Lao | Philippines | UP |
| 2014 | Arvin Tolentino | Philippines | Ateneo |
| 2015 | Andrei Caracut | Philippines | La Salle |
| 2016 | Aljun Melecio | Philippines | La Salle |
| 2017 | Juan Gómez de Liaño | Philippines | UP |
| 2018 | Ange Kouame | Ivory Coast | Ateneo |
| 2019 | Mark Nonoy | Philippines | UST |
| 2020 | No tournament held | | |
| 2021 | Carl Tamayo | Philippines | UP |
| 2022 | Kevin Quiambao | Philippines | La Salle |
| 2023 | Francis Lopez | Philippines | UP |
| 2024 | Veejay Pre | Philippines | FEU |
| 2025 | Collins Akowe | Nigeria | UST |

==== Women's tournament ====
| Season | Name | Nationality | Team |
|---|---|---|---|
| 1999 | Camille Dowling | Philippines | UP |
| 2000 | Erika Catlin Dy | Philippines | Ateneo |
| 2001 | Kristine Chua | Philippines | Ateneo |
| 2002 | Carolyn Tan-Chi | Philippines | Ateneo |
| 2003 | Cassie Tioseco | Philippines | Ateneo |
| 2004 | Angelica Barracoso | Philippines | Ateneo |
| 2005 | Sihaya Sadorra | Philippines | UP |
| 2006 | Katherine Sandel | Philippines | Adamson |
| 2007 | Cindy Resultay | Philippines | UE |
| 2008 | Angelica Ortega | Philippines | Adamson |
| 2009 | Miller Joy Ong | Philippines | La Salle |
| 2010 | Aracelie Abaca | Philippines | La Salle |
| 2011 | Gemma Miranda | Philippines | NU |
| 2012 | Princess Cochico | Philippines | Adamson |
| 2013 | Love Joy Sto. Domingo | Philippines | UE |
| 2014 | Ria Joy Nabalan | Philippines | NU |
| 2015 | Jack Animam | Philippines | NU |
| 2016 | Not awarded | | |
| 2017 | Mariann Justine Domingo | Philippines | UP |
| 2018 | Reynalyn Ferrer | Philippines | UST |
| 2019 | Kent Pastrana | Philippines | La Salle |
| 2020 | No tournament held | | |
| 2021 | No tournament held | | |
| 2022 | Kacey dela Rosa | Philippines | Ateneo |
| 2023 | Favour Onoh | Nigeria | UP |
| 2024 | Cielo Pagdulagan | Philippines | NU |
| 2025 | Erica de Luna | Philippines | Ateneo |

==== Boys' tournament ====
| Season | Name | Nationality | Team |
|---|---|---|---|
| 2001 | Christian Manlapaz | Philippines | UPIS |
| 2002 | Japs Cuan | Philippines | UST |
| 2003 | Leo Canuday | Philippines | Adamson |
| 2004 | David Urra | Philippines | DLSZ |
| 2005 | Raffy Mangahas | Philippines | FEU–FERN |
| 2006 | Jeff Olalia | Philippines | Adamson |
| 2007 | David Kurt de Guzman | Philippines | UE |
| 2008 | Luis Alfonso dela Paz | Philippines | DLSZ |
| 2009 | Kevin Ferrer | Philippines | UST |
| 2010 | Roque Estoce | Philippines | NSNU |
| 2011 | Tomas Ramos | Philippines | Ateneo |
| 2012 | Reggie Morido | Philippines | NSNU |
| 2013 | Aaron Reyes | Philippines | UST |
| 2015 | Not awarded | | |
| 2016 | Carl Tamayo | Philippines | Adamson |
| 2017 | Kai Sotto | Philippines | Ateneo |
| 2018 | Not awarded | | |
| 2019 | Not awarded | | |
| 2020 | Jean Lorenz Canillas | Philippines | UPIS |
| 2021 | No tournament held | | |
| 2022 | No tournament held | | |
| 2023 | Daryl Valdeavilla | Philippines | UPIS |
| 2024 | Nathan Egea | Philippines | UPIS |
| 2025 | Jhustin Hallare | Philippines | NU |
| 2026 | Moussa Diakite | Philippines | NU |

== Commissioner ==
| Season | Name |
|---|---|
| 2006 | Elmer Yanga |
| 2007 | Ed Cordero |
| 2008 | Chito Narvasa |
| 2009 | Joe Lipa |
| 2010 | Ato Badolato |
| 2011 | Andy Jao |
| 2012 | Ato Badolato |
| 2013 | Chito Loyzaga |
| 2014–15 | Andy Jao |
| 2015–16 | Rebo Saguisag |
| 2016–17 | Rebo Saguisag |
| 2017–18 | Rebo Saguisag |
| 2018–19 | Junel Baculi |
| 2019–20 | Jensen Ilagan |
| 2020 | – |
| 2021–22 | Tonichi Pujante |
| 2022–23 | Dickie Bachmann; Xavy Nunag |
| 2023–24 | Xavy Nunag |
| 2024–25 | Xavy Nunag |
| 2025–26 | Jai Reyes |

== Facts and trivia ==
- Last championship

- Men's Division:
  - De La Salle Green Archers: 2025
  - Ateneo Blue Eagles: 2022
  - UP Fighting Maroons: 2024
  - FEU Tamaraws: 2015
  - NU Bulldogs: 2014
  - UST Growling Tigers: 2006
  - UE Red Warriors: 1985
  - Adamson Falcons: 1977
- Juniors' Division:
  - Adamson Baby Falcons: 2024
  - FEU Baby Tamaraws: 2022
  - NU Bullpups: 2020
  - Ateneo Blue Eaglets: 2018
  - La Salle Junior Archers: 2007
  - UPIS Junior Maroons: 2002
  - UST Tiger Cubs: 2001
  - UE Junior Red Warriors: 1981
- Women's Division:
  - UST Tigresses: 2023
  - NU Lady Bulldogs: 2024
  - La Salle Lady Archers: 2013
  - FEU Lady Tamaraws: 2012
  - Adamson Lady Falcons: 2010
  - Ateneo Lady Eagles: 2007
  - UP Lady Maroons: 1983
  - UE Lady Warriors: –

- Last finals appearance:

- Men's Division:
  - La Salle Green Archers: 2025 (def. UP)
  - UP Fighting Maroons: 2025 (def. by La Salle)
  - Ateneo Blue Eagles: 2022 (def. UP)
  - UST Growling Tigers: 2019 (def. by Ateneo)
  - FEU Tamaraws: 2015 (def. UST)
  - NU Bulldogs: 2014 (def. FEU)
  - UE Red Warriors: 2009 (def. by Ateneo)
  - Adamson Falcons: 1993 (def. by UST)
  - MCU Tigers: 1958 (def. by UE)
- Juniors' Division:
  - Adamson Baby Falcons: 2024 (def. NU)
  - NU Bullpups: 2024 (def. by Adamson)
  - Ateneo Blue Eaglets: 2019 (def. by NU)
  - La Salle Junior Archers: 2015 (def. by NU)
  - FEU Baby Tamaraws: 2012 (def. by NU)
  - UST Tiger Cubs: 2010 (def. by Ateneo)
  - UPIS Junior Maroons: 2005 (def. by La Salle)
  - UE Red Pages: 1986 (def. by Ateneo)
- Women's Division:
  - NU Lady Bulldogs: 2023 (def. by UST)
  - UST Tigresses: 2023 (def. NU)
  - La Salle Lady Archers: 2022 (def. by NU)
  - FEU Lady Tamaraws: 2018 (def. by NU)
  - UE Lady Warriors: 2017 (def. by NU)
  - Ateneo Lady Eagles: 2015 (def. by NU)
  - Adamson Lady Falcons: 2011 (def. by FEU)
  - UP Lady Maroons: 2008 (def. by FEU)

- Championship streaks:
  - The UE Red Warriors owns the longest championship run in UAAP seniors' basketball, with seven straight championships (including a shared title), from 1965 to 1971.
  - The University of Santo Tomas won the juniors', women's and men's championship in the 1994–95 season, the only instance where the three championships were won by a school in one school year.
  - De La Salle University won both the men's and women's basketball championships in the 1999, 2000, 2001 and 2013 seasons, making them the first school to win three consecutive double championships in the seniors' division tournament.
  - The Ateneo de Manila University won the juniors' and men's championships in 2008 and 2009, making them the first school to score a back-to-back double championships in men's and juniors divisions. The following year 2010, Ateneo won the titles in both divisions again, making them the first school to win a three-peat double championship.
  - The NU Lady Bulldogs owns the longest championship run in UAAP women's basketball, with seven straight championships from Seasons 77 to 85. They also hold the record for the longest winning streak by any team in any sport in the UAAP, at 108 games (6 consecutive 16-game season sweeps from Season 77 to Season 82 + no tournament in Seasons 83 and 84 + all first 12 games of the eliminations in UAAP Season 85), and the first team in the league's history to win at least 100 consecutive games.
  - The Ateneo de Manila University won the men's championships in seasons 80, 81 and 82, making them the first school in UAAP history to win a 3-peat championship multiple times in the Final Four era. They are also the first men's basketball team to win all of their games in one season in the Final Four era, and has the longest winning streak in UAAP men's basketball history, at 39 games (10 from 2nd round of the eliminations to Finals in Season 81 + 16 for the entire season in Season 82 + no tournament in Season 83 + 13 in all first 13 games of the eliminations in Season 84).
  - The UP vs. La Salle Game 3 in 2024 holds the record for the largest in-venue attendance in any UAAP basketball match, and the second largest overall in-venue attendance in any sporting event in the UAAP, with 25,248 spectators at the Smart Araneta Coliseum.

== Championships by coach ==
Listed below are the coaches who won at least one UAAP men's championship. The list is incomplete.

| Active | Denotes coach who is still active in the UAAP |

| Coach | Championships | Champion teams handled | Last championship |
|---|---|---|---|
| Baby Dalupan | 12 | UE | 1971 |
| Herminio Silva | 9 | UST | 1953 |
| Arturo Valenzona | 8 | FEU | 1991 |
| Norman Black | 5 | Ateneo | 2012 |
| Franz Pumaren | 5 | La Salle | 2007 |
| Tab Baldwin | 4 | Ateneo | 2022 |
| Aric del Rosario | 4 | UST | 1996 |
| Felicisimo Fajardo | 2 | UST | 1959 |
| Jimmy Mariano | 2 | UE | 1985 |
| Topex Robinson | 2 | La Salle | 2025 |
| Goldwin Monteverde | 2 | UP | 2024 |
| Derrick Pumaren | 2 | La Salle | 1990 |
| Pilo Pumaren | UE | 1978 | |
| Eric Altamirano | 1 | NU | 2014 |
| Alfredo Amador | 1 | FEU | 1992 |
| Aldin Ayo | 1 | La Salle | 2016 |
| Cris Calilan | 1 | Ateneo | 1987 |
| Joel Banal | 1 | Ateneo | 2002 |
| Koy Banal | 1 | FEU | 2003 |
| Agapito de Castro | 1 | UE | 1982 |
| Bert Flores | 1 | FEU | 2005 |
| Fritz Gaston | 1 | Ateneo | 1988 |
| Danny Gaviernes | 1 | FEU | 1997 |
| Leonardo "Skip" Guinto | 1 | NU | 1954 |
| Pido Jarencio | 1 | UST | 2006 |
| Joe Lipa | 1 | UP | 1986 |
| Carlos Loyzaga | 1 | UST | 1964 |
| Nash Racela | 1 | FEU | 2015 |
| Juno Sauler | 1 | La Salle | 2013 |
| Egie Serafico | 1 | UST | 1967 |
| Moises Urbiztondo | 1 | Adamson | 1978 |

== See also ==
- NCAA Basketball Championship (Philippines)
