= UAAP Season 33 men's basketball tournament =

Basketball competition in the Philippines

1970 UAAP season
- Host school: University of Santo Tomas
Men's Finals	G1	Wins
UE Red Warriors	106	1
NU Bulldogs	95	0
- Duration: October 10, 1970
- Arena(s): Rizal Memorial Coliseum
- Winning coach: Baby Dalupan

The 1970 UAAP men's basketball tournament was the 33rd year of the men's tournament of the University Athletic Association of the Philippines (UAAP)'s basketball championship. Hosted by University of Santo Tomas, the UE Warriors defeated the NU Bulldogs in the finals taking their eleventh overall and sixth straight UAAP men's basketball championship. The Warriors would eventually win the title the following year achieving a league record seven-peat. This was National University's first finals appearance in 15 years since they were beaten by UST for the title round in 1955. This was also NU's last finals appearance prior to their 2014 championship title.

== Finals ==
University of the East remained the country's top varsity squad for the sixth straight year as the Warriors clobbered the National University Bulldogs, 106-95 for the UAAP basketball title at the Rizal Memorial Coliseum. The temperamental Johnny Revilla pumped in 27 points and had 12 assists as he sparked a savage third quarter attacked that boosted UE to the throne unbeaten for the second straight year.

Revilla, who maintained his cool for once despite getting deliberately tripped twice, combined with Rudolf Kutch, Rodolfo Soriano and Reynaldo Franco for a 20-4 outburst that gave UE a 20-point bubble at 79-59 going into the last quarter. The splurge left NU gagged for good and all that they could do was whittle the lead at gun-time. "He has to control his temper when he plays for me", said Baby Dalupan of Revilla after the match. Indeed, Revilla was a wonderful sight in his "keep cool" attitude. When he was not feeding or shooting, the RP youth player was hauling rebounds with authority.

UE's 46-28 edge in rebounds was enough factor for an early breakaway but its 26 errors stifled the spurt time and again. The Bulldogs, fighting in their first championship in 16 years, took advantage of these UE lapses to cling on to the Warriors' back at the half, 42-44.

== Trivia ==
Rafael Altamirano, the uncle of former NU coach Eric Altamirano, played for the Bulldogs in this title match.

Preceded by Season 32 (1969)	UAAP basketball seasons Season 33 (1970) basketball	Succeeded by Season 34 (1971)
