= UAAP Season 74 basketball tournaments =

Basketball competition in the Philippines

UAAP Season 74
- Host school: Ateneo de Manila University
| Men's Finals | G1 | G2 | Wins |
|---|---|---|---|
| Ateneo Blue Eagles | 82 | 82 | 2 |
| FEU Tamaraws | 64 | 69 | 0 |
- Duration: September 24–October 1, 2011
- Arena(s): Smart Araneta Coliseum
- Finals MVP: Nico Salva
- Winning coach: Norman Black (4th title)
- Semifinalists: Adamson Soaring Falcons; UST Growling Tigers
- TV network(s): ABS-CBN, The Filipino Channel, Balls, Balls HD
| Women's Finals | G1 | G2 | G3 | Wins |
|---|---|---|---|---|
| FEU Lady Tamaraws | 56 | 72 | 68 | 2 |
| Adamson Lady Falcons | 60 | 50 | 57 | 1 |
- Duration: September 24–October 2, 2011
- Arena(s): Smart Araneta Coliseum; Filoil Flying V Arena
- Finals MVP: Allana Lim
- Winning coach: Michael Oliver
- Semifinalists: UST Growling Tigresses; De La Salle Lady Archers
- TV network(s): Studio 23 (Games 2 & 3)
| Juniors' Finals | G1 (OT) | G2 | G3 | Wins |
|---|---|---|---|---|
| FEU–D Baby Tamaraws | 71 | 46 | 63 | 1 |
| NUNS Bullpups | 67 | 57 | 72 | 2 |
- Duration: September 24–October 2, 2011
- Arena(s): Smart Araneta Coliseum; Filoil Flying V Arena
- Finals MVP: Ralph Atangan
- Winning coach: Jeff Napa
- Semifinalists: Zobel Junior Archers; Ateneo Blue Eaglets
- TV network(s): Studio 23 (Games 2 & 3)

The University Athletic Association of the Philippines Season 74 basketball tournaments are the basketball events of UAAP's 2011–12 season. Ateneo de Manila University was the season host. The season started with an Olympic-style opening ceremony on July 9, 2011 and followed by a doubleheader basketball games on July 10 at the Araneta Coliseum.

The UAAP named former Philippine Basketball League (PBL) commissioner, current Rain or Shine Elasto Painters team consultant and Philippine Basketball Association (PBA) TV commentator Andy Jao as commissioner for basketball. Jao is considering on recommending to the UAAP board on hiring referees from the Samahang Basketbol ng Pilipinas (SBP).

The game schedules were changed. Instead of the usual 2 p.m. and 4 p.m. schedules, game time were moved to 1 p.m. and 3 p.m. so that students can go home earlier and that basketball fans can also get to watch the PBA games which usually start at 5:30 p.m.

The eligibility of two players, Ray Parks and Greg Slaughter, were scrutinized by the UAAP Eligibility Committee. Parks of NU studied high school in the United States of America while Slaughter of Ateneo played with the Smart Gilas national team in the 2011 PBA Commissioner's Cup while serving residency.

At the eligibility meeting, Parks' and Slaughter's eligibilities were questioned. Parks had already undergone a one-year residency but the committee says that he has to do a two-year residency as he studied abroad. Ateneo's Ricky Palou, also UAAP President, said that Slaughter's appearance with Smart Gilas was not an issue.

Slaughter's eligibility was cleared by the Eligibility Committee, pending approval by the UAAP Board. Meanwhile, Parks did not get a recommendation as additional documents were required by the Eligibility Committee.

NU officials issued a statement that Parks has met all eligibility requirements and should be allowed play. NU athletic director Junel Baculi mentioned exceptions to the two-year redshirt rule when a player's parents were assigned abroad due to the nature of their jobs and children whose parents are overseas Filipino workers. Parks, who was born in the Philippines and studied in a local school up to seventh grade, went abroad when his mother took a job in the US where he studied at St. George's up to the 11th grade. He returned to the Philippines with his father in the late 2000s recession.

The UAAP Board eventually cleared both Parks and Slaughter, the former after having presented additional documents.

Another decision the Board had to make was which group of referees would be selected to officiate the games. The Basketball Referees Association for Schools, Colleges and Universities (BRASCU) and the referees from the SBP were the two organizations that were being chosen by the UAAP board.

== Final Four Recap ==
The Ateneo Blue Eagles finished on top of the elimination round standings although they were denied a 14–0 sweep by the Adamson Falcons, which clinched the #2 seed. The FEU Tamaraws faced the Falcons in the semifinals, in a series that went into two games. The Tamaraws were on their way of eliminating Adamson but the Falcons managed to cut FEU's double-digit lead but the Tamaraws held on to win. The Eagles met the UST Growling Tigers in the other semifinal series, with the Tigers reducing Ateneo's double-digit lead to a single basket but were denied in their last possession. In a rematch of the 2010 Finals where Ateneo won, the Eagles swept the Finals series 2–0 against the Tamaraws, with Nico Salva being named the Finals MVP. Ateneo won its fourth consecutive championship in Men's Basketball.

In the Juniors' tournament, the FEU-FERN Baby Tamaraws clinched the #1 seed after winning 12 consecutive games; their only loss against Ateneo at their second game. The Baby Tamaraws faced the Blue Eaglets in the semifinals, where Ateneo forced a deciding game; FEU-FERN won on the second game to advance to the Finals. The De La Salle Zobel Junior Archers, which won their first eight games, lost to FEU, NU and Ateneo in the second round to finish second. They met the NU Bullpups in the semifinals, which won in the first game. The Bullpups hanged on for a three-point win to clinch a Finals berth. The Baby Tamaraws won Game 1 in overtime, but the Bullpups won their school's first juniors' basketball title since 1974 by winning the last two games. Ralph Atangan was named the Finals MVP.

Last season's runner-up FEU Lady Tamaraws finished first after the elimination round and faced the De La Salle Lady Archers in the semifinals. DLSU forced a rubber match with a three-point win but FEU scored a 22-point blowout in the second game to advance to the Finals. The UST Tigresses, which had won all first round games, were tied by Adamson and DLSU at the end of the eliminations. With DLSU emerging as the team with lowest quotient, UST and Adamson played off for the #2 seed, a game where the Lady Falcons won convincingly. The Lady Falcons had another convincing win against the Tigresses in the semifinals to arrange a Finals rematch against FEU. The Lady Falcons took Game 1 with a 4-point win, but FEU won Game 2 with a 22-point margin; FEU won the deciding game via an 11-point victory. Allana Lim was awarded Finals MVP.

== Men's tournament ==
=== Teams ===
| Team | University | Coach |
|---|---|---|
| Adamson Soaring Falcons | Adamson University (AdU) | (Philippines) Leo Austria |
| Ateneo Blue Eagles | Ateneo de Manila University (ADMU) | (United States) Norman Black |
| De La Salle Green Archers | De La Salle University (DLSU) | (Philippines) Dindo Pumaren |
| FEU Tamaraws | Far Eastern University (FEU) | (Philippines) Bert Flores |
| NU Bulldogs | National University (NU) | (Philippines) Eric Altamirano |
| UE Red Warriors | University of the East (UE) | (Philippines) Jerry Codiñera |
| UP Fighting Maroons | University of the Philippines Diliman (UP) | (Philippines) Ricky Dandan |
| UST Growling Tigers | University of Santo Tomas (UST) | (Philippines) Pido Jarencio |

==== Coaching changes ====
| Team | Old coach | Reason | New coach |
|---|---|---|---|
| UE | (Philippines) Lawrence Chongson | Expired contract | (Philippines) Jerry Codinera |
| UP | (Philippines) Boyet Fernandez | Resigned | (Philippines) Ricky Dandan |
| NU | (Philippines) Eric Gonzales | Returned as NU assistant coach | (Philippines) Eric Altamirano |
| FEU | (Philippines) Glenn Capacio | Resigned | (Philippines) Bert Flores |

=== Elimination round ===
==== Team standings ====
| Pos | Team | W | L | PCT | GB | Qualification |
|---|---|---|---|---|---|---|
| 1 | Ateneo Blue Eagles (H) | 13 | 1 | .929 | — | Twice-to-beat in the semifinals |
| 2 | Adamson Soaring Falcons | 10 | 4 | .714 | 3 | Twice-to-beat in the semifinals |
| 3 | FEU Tamaraws | 9 | 5 | .643 | 4 | Twice-to-win in the semifinals |
| 4 | UST Growling Tigers | 8 | 6 | .571 | 5 | Twice-to-win in the semifinals |
| 5 | NU Bulldogs | 6 | 8 | .429 | 7 | |
| 6 | De La Salle Green Archers | 5 | 9 | .357 | 8 | |
| 7 | UE Red Warriors | 3 | 11 | .214 | 10 | |
| 8 | UP Fighting Maroons | 2 | 12 | .143 | 11 | |

Source: ABS-CBN Sports
Rules for classification: 1) winning percentage; 2) if tied for #2 or #4, one-game playoff; 3) head-to-head record; 4) head-to-head point differential; 5) overall point differential
(H) Hosts

==== Match-up results ====
| | Round 1 | | | | | | | Round 2 | | | | | | |
| Team ╲ Game | 1 | 2 | 3 | 4 | 5 | 6 | 7 | 8 | 9 | 10 | 11 | 12 | 13 | 14 |
|---|---|---|---|---|---|---|---|---|---|---|---|---|---|---|
| Adamson | Ateneo school colors | FEU school colors | UST school colors | UE school colors | NU school colors | La Salle school colors | UP school colors | La Salle school colors | NU school colors | FEU school colors | UP school colors | UE school colors | UST school colors | Ateneo school colors |
| Ateneo | Adamson school colors | La Salle school colors | NU school colors | UE school colors | UP school colors | UST school colors | FEU school colors | FEU school colors | UST school colors | UE school colors | La Salle school colors | UP school colors | NU school colors | Adamson school colors |
| La Salle | FEU school colors | Ateneo school colors | UP school colors | NU school colors | UE school colors | Adamson school colors | UST school colors | Adamson school colors | UE school colors | UST school colors | Ateneo school colors | UP school colors | NU school colors | FEU school colors |
| FEU | La Salle school colors | Adamson school colors | UE school colors | NU school colors | UST school colors | UP school colors | Ateneo school colors | Ateneo school colors | UP school colors | Adamson school colors | NU school colors | UE school colors | UST school colors | La Salle school colors |
| NU | UST school colors | UP school colors | Ateneo school colors | FEU school colors | La Salle school colors | Adamson school colors | UE school colors | UE school colors | Adamson school colors | UP school colors | FEU school colors | Ateneo school colors | La Salle school colors | UST school colors |
| UE | UP school colors | UST school colors | FEU school colors | Ateneo school colors | Adamson school colors | La Salle school colors | NU school colors | NU school colors | La Salle school colors | Ateneo school colors | UST school colors | Adamson school colors | FEU school colors | UP school colors |
| UP | UE school colors | NU school colors | La Salle school colors | Ateneo school colors | FEU school colors | UST school colors | Adamson school colors | UST school colors | FEU school colors | NU school colors | Adamson school colors | Ateneo school colors | La Salle school colors | UE school colors |
| UST | NU school colors | UE school colors | Adamson school colors | FEU school colors | Ateneo school colors | UP school colors | La Salle school colors | UP school colors | Ateneo school colors | La Salle school colors | UE school colors | Adamson school colors | FEU school colors | NU school colors |

= Win; = OT win; = Loss; = OT loss

==== Results ====
| Team | AdU | ADMU | DLSU | FEU | NU | UE | UP | UST |
|---|---|---|---|---|---|---|---|---|
| Adamson Soaring Falcons | | 51–55 | 66–58 | 78–59 | 56–63 | 85–54 | 72–46 | 81–71 |
| Ateneo Blue Eagles | 46–62 | | 81–72 | 69–49 | 86–62 | 73–61 | 77–57 | 66–53 |
| De La Salle Green Archers | 66–68 | 62–79 | | 65–74 | 74–63 | 87–63 | 79–67 | 74–71 |
| FEU Tamaraws | 62–61 | 67–74* | 66–57 | | 62–59 | 66–47 | 63–76 | 62–59 |
| NU Bulldogs | 53–68 | 39–61 | 56–40 | 82–84** | | 71–72 | 75–66 | 72–73* |
| UE Red Warriors | 57–76 | 70–74 | 74–69 | 68–79 | 51–91 | | 61–69 | 63–70 |
| UP Fighting Maroons | 51–64 | 58–73 | 72–73 | 53–59 | 43–65 | 54–68 | | 49–68 |
| UST Growling Tigers | 74–58 | 57–82 | 60–52 | 77–73 | 49–73 | 54–45 | 77–70 | |

Legend: Blue = left column team win; Red = top row team win.
Matches with lighter background shading were decided after overtime.

=== Bracket ===
Semifinals (Top 2 twice-to-beat)
1 | Ateneo | 69
4 | UST | 66
2 | Adamson | 49 | 74
3 | FEU | 59 | 78

Finals (Best-of-three playoff)
1 | Ateneo | 82 | 82
3 | FEU | 64 | 69

=== Semifinals ===
==== (1) Ateneo vs. (4) UST ====
Studio 23

September 15
1:00 p.m.

| Ateneo Blue Eagles | 69–66 | UST Growling Tigers |
Scoring by quarter: 18-18, 20-12, 14-10, 17-26
Ateneo wins series in one game

Smart Araneta Coliseum, Quezon City

==== (2) Adamson vs. (3) FEU ====
Studio 23

September 15
3:00 p.m.

| Adamson Soaring Falcons | 49–59 | FEU Tamaraws |
Scoring by quarter: 9-11, 14-18, 9-23, 17-7

Smart Araneta Coliseum, Quezon City

Studio 23

September 18
3:00 p.m.

| Adamson Soaring Falcons | 74–78 | FEU Tamaraws |
Scoring by quarter: 18-14, 15-21, 17-22, 24-21
FEU wins series in two games

Smart Araneta Coliseum, Quezon City

=== Finals ===
ABS-CBN

September 24
3:00 p.m.

| Ateneo Blue Eagles | 82–64 | FEU Tamaraws |

Smart Araneta Coliseum, Quezon City

ABS-CBN

October 1
3:00 p.m.

| Ateneo Blue Eagles | 82–69 | FEU Tamaraws |
Ateneo wins series 2–0

Smart Araneta Coliseum, Quezon City

- Finals Most Valuable Player: Nico Salva (Ateneo Blue Eagles)

Note: Due to typhoon Pedring, Game 2 was suspended and rescheduled to October 1, 2011.

=== Awards ===
UAAP Season 74 men's basketball champions
Ateneo Blue Eagles
Seventh title, fourth consecutive title

- Most Valuable Player: Bobby Ray Parks Jr. (NU Bulldogs)
- Rookie of the Year: Kiefer Ravena (Ateneo Blue Eagles)
- Mythical Five:
  - Kiefer Ravena (Ateneo Blue Eagles)
  - Greg Slaughter (Ateneo Blue Eagles)
  - Bobby Ray Parks Jr. (NU Bulldogs)
  - Alex Nuyles (Adamson Soaring Falcons)
  - Aldrech Ramos (FEU Tamaraws)
- Champ of the Season: RR Garcia (FEU Tamaraws)
- Maaasahan Player of the Year: RR Garcia (FEU Tamaraws)
- Most Improved Player of the Season: Jett Manuel (UP Fighting Maroons)

== Women's tournament ==
=== Elimination round ===
==== Team standings ====
| Pos | Team | W | L | PCT | GB | Qualification |
|---|---|---|---|---|---|---|
| 1 | FEU Lady Tamaraws | 12 | 2 | .857 | — | Twice-to-beat in the semifinals |
| 2 | Adamson Lady Falcons | 10 | 4 | .714 (Note: Head-to-head record: Adamson 2–2, La Salle 2–2, UST 2–2 (UST +27, Adamson –3, La Salle –24); second-seed playoff: Adamson 70–59 UST) | 2 | Twice-to-beat in the semifinals |
| 3 | UST Growling Tigresses | 10 | 4 | .714 | 2 | Twice-to-win in the semifinals |
| 4 | De La Salle Lady Archers | 10 | 4 | .714 | 2 | Twice-to-win in the semifinals |
| 5 | Ateneo Lady Eagles (H) | 7 | 7 | .500 | 5 | |
| 6 | NU Lady Bulldogs | 4 | 10 | .286 | 8 | |
| 7 | UP Lady Maroons | 2 | 12 | .143 | 10 | |
| 8 | UE Lady Warriors | 1 | 13 | .071 | 11 | |

Source: ABS-CBN Sports
Rules for classification: 1) winning percentage; 2) if tied for #2 or #4, one-game playoff; 3) head-to-head record; 4) head-to-head point differential; 5) overall point differential
(H) Hosts

==== Match-up results ====
| | Round 1 | | | | | | | Round 2 | | | | | | |
| Team ╲ Game | 1 | 2 | 3 | 4 | 5 | 6 | 7 | 8 | 9 | 10 | 11 | 12 | 13 | 14 |
|---|---|---|---|---|---|---|---|---|---|---|---|---|---|---|
| Adamson | UST school colors | NU school colors | La Salle school colors | UP school colors | Ateneo school colors | UE school colors | FEU school colors | UST school colors | UP school colors | FEU school colors | UE school colors | La Salle school colors | NU school colors | Ateneo school colors |
| Ateneo | NU school colors | UST school colors | UP school colors | FEU school colors | Adamson school colors | La Salle school colors | UE school colors | FEU school colors | UE school colors | UST school colors | La Salle school colors | NU school colors | UP school colors | Adamson school colors |
| La Salle | FEU school colors | UE school colors | Adamson school colors | NU school colors | UP school colors | Ateneo school colors | UST school colors | UP school colors | UST school colors | UE school colors | Ateneo school colors | Adamson school colors | FEU school colors | NU school colors |
| FEU | La Salle school colors | UP school colors | UST school colors | Ateneo school colors | UE school colors | NU school colors | Adamson school colors | Ateneo school colors | NU school colors | Adamson school colors | UP school colors | UE school colors | La Salle school colors | UST school colors |
| NU | Ateneo school colors | Adamson school colors | UE school colors | La Salle school colors | UST school colors | FEU school colors | UP school colors | UE school colors | FEU school colors | UP school colors | UST school colors | Ateneo school colors | Adamson school colors | La Salle school colors |
| UE | UP school colors | La Salle school colors | NU school colors | UST school colors | FEU school colors | Adamson school colors | Ateneo school colors | NU school colors | Ateneo school colors | La Salle school colors | Adamson school colors | FEU school colors | UST school colors | UP school colors |
| UP | UE school colors | FEU school colors | Ateneo school colors | Adamson school colors | La Salle school colors | UST school colors | NU school colors | La Salle school colors | Adamson school colors | NU school colors | FEU school colors | UST school colors | Ateneo school colors | UE school colors |
| UST | Adamson school colors | Ateneo school colors | FEU school colors | UE school colors | NU school colors | UP school colors | La Salle school colors | Adamson school colors | La Salle school colors | Ateneo school colors | NU school colors | UP school colors | UE school colors | FEU school colors |

= Win; = OT win; = Loss; = OT loss

==== Results ====
| Team | AdU | ADMU | DLSU | FEU | NU | UE | UP | UST |
|---|---|---|---|---|---|---|---|---|
| Adamson Lady Falcons | | 69–44 | 49–41 | 45–53 | 70–58 | 74–55 | 53–41 | 60–66 |
| Ateneo Lady Eagles | 42–49 | | 60–53 | 32–53 | 64–51 | 67–45 | 41–30 | 51–64 |
| De La Salle Lady Archers | 58–51* | 43–39 | | 61–59 | 62–52 | 55–52 | 38–29 | 53–60 |
| FEU Lady Tamaraws | 74–51 | 67–49 | 59–53* | | 65–52 | 88–50 | 58–34 | 65–66 |
| NU Lady Bulldogs | 60–78 | 49–60 | 39–47 | 60–83 | | 55–47 | 57–51 | 58–62 |
| UE Lady Warriors | 67–77 | 51–67 | 57–63* | 53–88 | 68–79 | | 52–64 | 74–76 |
| UP Lady Maroons | 42–75 | 43–53 | 29–58 | 40–64 | 60–59 | ??–?? | | 48–60 |
| UST Tigresses | 55–67 | 56–46 | 49–51 | 58–71 | 74–81 | 72–63 | 56–43 | |

Legend: Blue = left column team win; Red = top row team win.
Matches with lighter background shading were decided after overtime.

=== Second seed playoff ===
September 13

| Adamson Lady Falcons | 70–59 | UST Growling Tigresses |
Adamson wins the twice–to–beat advantage

Blue Eagle Gym, Quezon City

=== Bracket ===
Semifinals (Top 2 twice-to-beat)
1 | FEU | 54 | 66
4 | La Salle | 57 | 44
2 | Adamson | 53
3 | UST | 45

Finals (Best-of-three playoff)
1 | FEU | 56 | 72 | 68
2 | Adamson | 60 | 50 | 57

=== Semifinals ===
==== (1) FEU vs. (4) La Salle ====
September 16

| FEU Lady Tamaraws | 54–57 | De La Salle Lady Archers |

Blue Eagle Gym, Quezon City

September 20

| FEU Lady Tamaraws | 66–44 | De La Salle Lady Archers |
FEU wins series in two games

Blue Eagle Gym, Quezon City

==== (2) Adamson vs. (3) UST ====
September 16

| Adamson Lady Falcons | 53–45 | UST Growling Tigresses |
Adamson wins series in one game

Blue Eagle Gym, Quezon City

=== Finals ===
September 24

| FEU Lady Tamaraws | 56–60 | Adamson Lady Falcons |

Smart Araneta Coliseum, Quezon City

September 27

| FEU Lady Tamaraws | 72–50 | Adamson Lady Falcons |

Smart Araneta Coliseum, Quezon City

October 2

| FEU Lady Tamaraws | 68–57 | Adamson Lady Falcons |
FEU wins series 2–1

Filoil Flying V Arena, San Juan

- Finals Most Valuable Player: Allana Lim (FEU Lady Tamaraws)

Studio 23 aired Games 2 and 3 on October 20 and 21.

=== Awards ===
UAAP Season 74 women's basketball champions
FEU Lady Tamaraws
Tenth title

- Most Valuable Player: Raiza Palmera (FEU Lady Tamaraws)
- Rookie of the Year: Gemma Miranda (NU Lady Bulldogs)

== Juniors' tournament ==
=== Elimination round ===
==== Team standings ====
| Pos | Team | W | L | PCT | GB | Qualification |
|---|---|---|---|---|---|---|
| 1 | FEU–D Baby Tamaraws | 12 | 2 | .857 | — | Twice-to-beat in the semifinals |
| 2 | Zobel Junior Archers | 11 | 3 | .786 | 1 | Twice-to-beat in the semifinals |
| 3 | NUNS Bullpups | 10 | 4 | .714 | 2 | Twice-to-win in the semifinals |
| 4 | Ateneo Blue Eaglets (H) | 9 | 5 | .643 | 3 | Twice-to-win in the semifinals |
| 5 | Adamson Baby Falcons | 7 | 7 | .500 | 5 | |
| 6 | UST Tiger Cubs | 5 | 9 | .357 | 7 | |
| 7 | UE Junior Red Warriors | 1 | 13 | .071 (Note: Head-to-head record: UE 1–1 UP (UE +8)) | 11 | |
| 8 | UPIS Junior Fighting Maroons | 1 | 13 | .071 | 11 | |

Source: ABS-CBN Sports
Rules for classification: 1) winning percentage; 2) if tied for #2 or #4, one-game playoff; 3) head-to-head record; 4) head-to-head point differential; 5) overall point differential
(H) Hosts

==== Schedule ====
| | Round 1 | | | | | | | Round 2 | | | | | | |
| Team ╲ Game | 1 | 2 | 3 | 4 | 5 | 6 | 7 | 8 | 9 | 10 | 11 | 12 | 13 | 14 |
|---|---|---|---|---|---|---|---|---|---|---|---|---|---|---|
| Adamson | UP school colors | UST school colors | UE school colors | Ateneo school colors | NU school colors | La Salle school colors | FEU school colors | UE school colors | La Salle school colors | UP school colors | NU school colors | FEU school colors | Ateneo school colors | UST school colors |
| Ateneo | La Salle school colors | FEU school colors | NU school colors | Adamson school colors | UE school colors | UP school colors | UST school colors | NU school colors | UST school colors | FEU school colors | UE school colors | UP school colors | Adamson school colors | La Salle school colors |
| DLSZ | Ateneo school colors | UE school colors | UST school colors | UP school colors | FEU school colors | Adamson school colors | NU school colors | FEU school colors | Adamson school colors | NU school colors | UST school colors | UE school colors | UP school colors | Ateneo school colors |
| FEU–FERN | UE school colors | Ateneo school colors | UP school colors | NU school colors | La Salle school colors | UST school colors | Adamson school colors | La Salle school colors | UE school colors | Ateneo school colors | UP school colors | Adamson school colors | UST school colors | NU school colors |
| NSNU | UST school colors | UP school colors | Ateneo school colors | FEU school colors | Adamson school colors | UE school colors | La Salle school colors | Ateneo school colors | UP school colors | La Salle school colors | Adamson school colors | UST school colors | UE school colors | FEU school colors |
| UE | FEU school colors | La Salle school colors | Adamson school colors | UST school colors | Ateneo school colors | NU school colors | UP school colors | Adamson school colors | FEU school colors | UST school colors | Ateneo school colors | La Salle school colors | NU school colors | UP school colors |
| UPIS | Adamson school colors | NU school colors | FEU school colors | La Salle school colors | UST school colors | Ateneo school colors | UE school colors | UST school colors | NU school colors | Adamson school colors | FEU school colors | Ateneo school colors | La Salle school colors | UE school colors |
| UST | NU school colors | Adamson school colors | La Salle school colors | UE school colors | UP school colors | FEU school colors | Ateneo school colors | UP school colors | Ateneo school colors | UE school colors | La Salle school colors | NU school colors | FEU school colors | Adamson school colors |

= Win; = OT win; = Loss; = OT loss

==== Results ====
| Team | AdU | ADMU | DLSZ | FEU-F | NU | UE | UPIS | UST |
|---|---|---|---|---|---|---|---|---|
| Adamson Baby Falcons | | 65–71 | 61–70 | 52–60 | 57–63 | 92–54 | 83–64 | 75–65* |
| Ateneo Blue Eaglets | 61–76 | | 75–78* | 60–48 | 47–42 | 81–59 | 74–59 | 52–54 |
| Zobel Junior Archers | 82–58 | 56–67 | | 63–60 | 69–52 | 92–59 | 102–48 | 74–55 |
| FEU-FERN Baby Tamaraws | 63–61 | 73–58 | 62–56 | | 84–79 | 96–68 | 92–46 | 66–55 |
| NSNU Bullpups | 64–53 | 76–53 | 52–47 | 60–71 | | 73–67 | 85–49 | 63–59* |
| UE Junior Warriors | 45–75 | 60–69 | 48–77 | 79–72 | 50–57 | | 92–82* | 56–68 |
| UPIS Junior Maroons | 60–63 | 62–66 | 56–78 | 49–64 | 68–74 | 73–71* | | 61–67 |
| UST Tiger Cubs | 49–57 | 42–63 | 47–56 | 48–51 | 50–51 | 65–47 | 60–58 | |

Legend: Blue = left column team win; Red = top row team win.
Matches with lighter background shading were decided after overtime.

=== Bracket ===
Semifinals (Top 2 twice-to-beat)
1 | FEU–FERN | 53 | 63
4 | Ateneo | 62 | 56
2 | DLSZ | 52 | 46
3 | NSNU | 66 | 49

Finals (Best-of-three playoff)
1 | FEU–FERN | 71 | 46 | 63
3 | NSNU | 67 | 57 | 72

=== Semifinals ===
==== (1) FEU-D vs. (4) Ateneo ====
September 16

| FEU–D Baby Tamaraws | 53–62 | Ateneo Blue Eaglets |

Blue Eagle Gym, Quezon City

September 20

| FEU–D Baby Tamaraws | 63–56 | Ateneo Blue Eaglets |
FEU wins series in two games

Blue Eagle Gym, Quezon City

==== (2) DLSZ vs. (3) NU ====
September 16

| Zobel Junior Archers | 52–66 | NUNS Bullpups |

Blue Eagle Gym, Quezon City

September 20

| Zobel Junior Archers | 46–49 | NUNS Bullpups |
NU wins series in two games

Blue Eagle Gym, Quezon City

=== Finals ===
September 24

| FEU–D Baby Tamaraws | 71–67 (OT) | NUNS Bullpups |

Smart Araneta Coliseum, Quezon City

September 27

| FEU–D Baby Tamaraws | 46–57 | NUNS Bullpups |

Smart Araneta Coliseum, Quezon City

October 2

| FEU–D Baby Tamaraws | 63–72 | NUNS Bullpups |
NU wins series 2–1

Filoil Flying V Arena, San Juan

- Finals Most Valuable Player: Ralp Atangan (NUNS Bullpups)

Studio 23 aired Games 2 and 3 on October 20 and 21.

=== Awards ===
UAAP Season 74 juniors' basketball champions
NUNS Bullpups
Fourth title

- Most Valuable Player: Jerie Pingoy (FEU–D Baby Tamaraws)
- Rookie of the Year: Tomas Ramos (Ateneo Blue Eaglets)

== See also ==
- NCAA Season 87 basketball tournaments

| Preceded by Season 73 (2010) | UAAP basketball seasons Season 74 (2011) | Succeeded by Season 75 (2012) |
