= La Salle–UST rivalry =

Rivalry between two teams in the Philippines

- De La Salle Green Archers UST Growling Tigers
- Sport: Men's basketball
- First meeting: August 8, 1987
- Latest meeting: October 25, 2026 (at Blue Eagle Gym); La Salle, 92–80
- Next meeting: TBA

Statistics
- All-time series (UAAP only): La Salle, 68–29
- Trophy series: UST, 8–6
- Largest victory: La Salle, 128–85 (1989); La Salle, 99–56 (2016)
- Smallest victory: UST, 77–76 (1994); La Salle, 85–84 (2008); UST, 73–72 (2013); La Salle, 80–79 (2019)
- Largest goal scoring: La Salle, 43 points (1989, 2016)

Playoffs history
- UAAP Season 57 Finals: UST, 2–1; UAAP Season 58 Finals: UST, 2–1; UAAP Season 59 Finals: UST, 2–0; UAAP Season 60 Semifinals: La Salle, 2–0; UAAP Season 61 Semifinals: 1–1 (La Salle advances to Finals); UAAP Season 62 #1 seed playoff: La Salle, 84–79; UAAP Season 62 Finals: La Salle, 2–1; UAAP Season 63 Semifinals: La Salle, 65–62; UAAP Season 65 Semifinals: La Salle, 97–84; UAAP Season 76 Finals: La Salle, 2–1

Locations of UST and La Salle

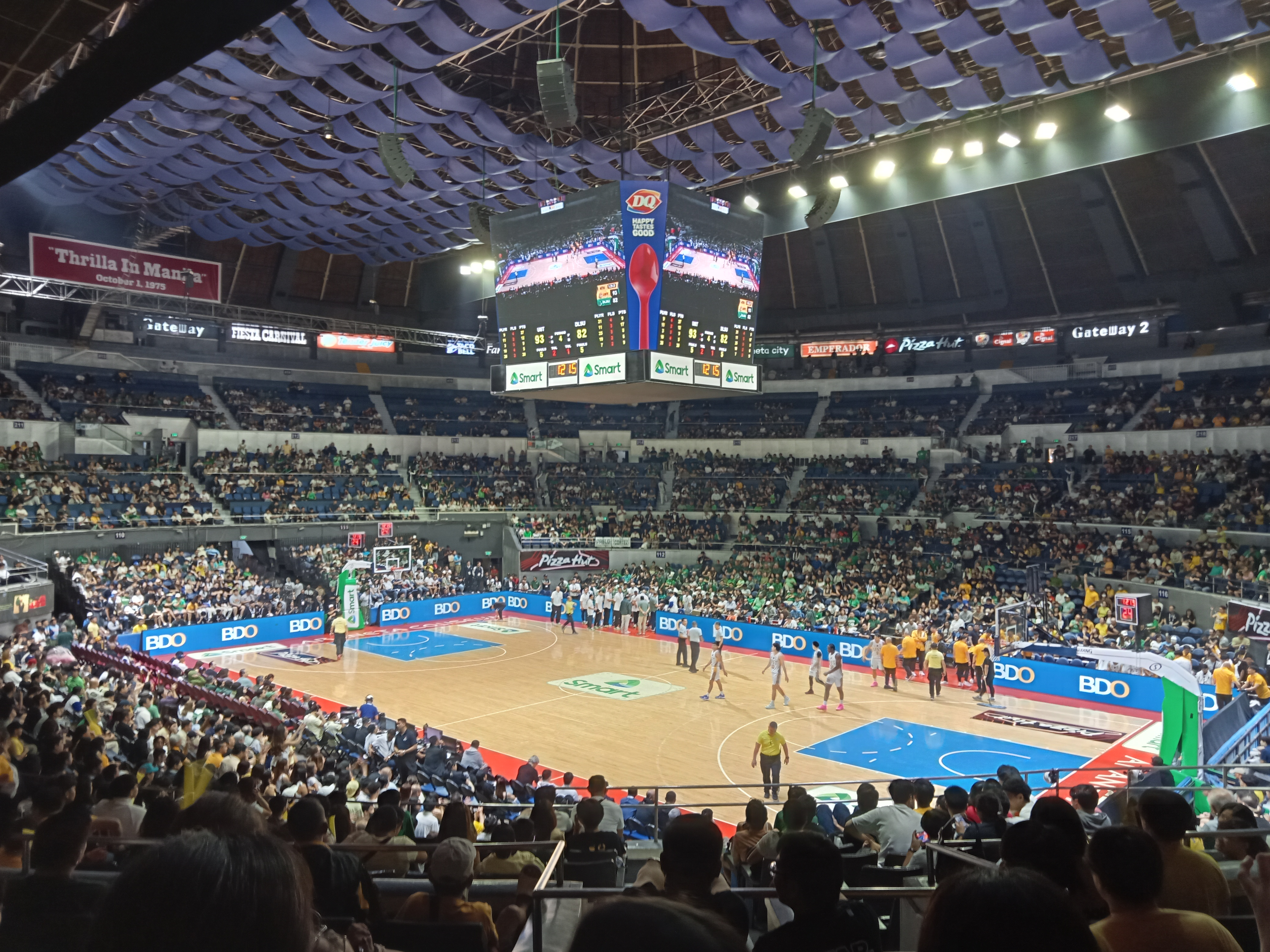
UAAP Season 88 basketball tournaments men's 1st round game between UST and La Salle.

The rivalry between the De La Salle University (DLSU) Green Archers and the University of Santo Tomas (UST) Growling Tigers is contested at the University Athletic Association of the Philippines (UAAP). Although the men's basketball rivalry had died down after the 1990s, it returned in 2013 as both schools again met in the UAAP basketball championship series. The rivalry had also been apparent in women's volleyball where the two teams are frequent finalists in the UAAP volleyball championships and the Shakey's V-League.

== History ==
Prior to La Salle joining the UAAP the two schools met in the championship of the 1948–49 season of the National Seniors Open, a yearly tournament of top collegiate and commercial teams in the country. The De La Salle Green Archers defeated the UST Glowing Goldies in overtime to win the title.

The rivalry returned on consecutive UAAP Finals series in men's basketball. La Salle was defeated three consecutive years in the Finals from 1994 through 1996 capping UST's four-year title run. UST was finally dethroned by La Salle during the 1997 semifinals. In 1998 La Salle again eliminated UST in the semifinals to begin their own four-year championship streak. La Salle bounced back defeating UST in overtime for the 1999 UAAP basketball title. The Game 1 finals victory was their last against La Salle until 2007 when UST won in overtime during regular season; La Salle went on to win the 2007 UAAP title. At this point UST's basketball program regressed, but they won a championship against the Ateneo Blue Eagles in three games in 2006. La Salle was suspended in 2006 after admitting they had unknowingly fielded two ineligible players in the previous seasons. La Salle would then win all games until 2011. La Salle again defeated UST in overtime during the UAAP Season 76 basketball championship in 2013.

The rivalry carried over to women's volleyball in the UAAP and Shakey's V-League. The De La Salle Lady Spikers and the UST Golden Tigresses met three times in the championship of the Shakey's V-League tournament with UST winning the first and La Salle winning the latter two. The Tigresses have won six championships while the Lady Spikers have three under their belt.

In the UAAP, the De La Salle Lady Spikers and the UST Golden Tigresses met in the Finals for two consecutive seasons – Season 72 (won by UST) and Season 73 (won by La Salle), although UST has seen fluctuation in season-long performances in women's volleyball amidst the rise of contemporary contenders such as Ateneo de Manila University, Far Eastern University, and National University. Both schools, however, met in the semifinals in Season 79 (won by La Salle) and Season 81 (won by UST), the latter of which ended La Salle's decade-long streak of finals appearances by 2019 (running from 2009 to 2018), the most in the Final Four era of the UAAP.

== Men's basketball ==
Both teams are guaranteed to face each other at the elimination round (regular season) twice, while they can meet for a maximum of three times in the playoffs. The games were played consistently from 1986 until 2006 when La Salle was suspended for fielding two ineligible players. La Salle and UST previously met each other when they were members of the NCAA from 1924 to 1936.

La Salle victories	UST victories

No.	Date	Location	Winner	Score
1	August 1, 1987	Rizal Memorial Coliseum	La Salle	89–76
2	September 9, 1987	Rizal Memorial Coliseum	UST	100–85
3	August 4, 1988	Rizal Memorial Coliseum	La Salle	71–66
4	August 27, 1988	Rizal Memorial Coliseum	UST	75–70
5	July 23, 1989	Araneta Coliseum	La Salle	88–69
6	September 10, 1989	Araneta Coliseum	La Salle	128–85
7	August 8, 1990	Araneta Coliseum	UST	20–0 (Note: La Salle's 90–80 win over UST on August 8, 1990, was reversed to a loss after the board ruled Noli Locsin to be ineligible.)
8	September 30, 1990	Araneta Coliseum	La Salle	80–78
9	August 14, 1991	Loyola Center	La Salle	100–83
10	August 31, 1991	Loyola Center	La Salle	85–80
11	August 1, 1992	Loyola Center	UST	88–65
12	September 26, 1992	Loyola Center	La Salle	82–80
13	July 24, 1993	Araneta Coliseum	UST	80–70
14	September 11, 1993	Loyola Center	UST	95–84
15	August 13, 1994	Cuneta Astrodome	La Salle	83–73
16	August 27, 1994	Cuneta Astrodome	UST	68–66
17	September 24, 1994*	Cuneta Astrodome	La Salle	77–74
18	October 1, 1994*	Cuneta Astrodome	UST	89–75
19	October 8, 1994*	Cuneta Astrodome	UST	77–76
20	August 12, 1995	Araneta Coliseum	UST	75–59
21	September 16, 1995	Araneta Coliseum	UST	87–84
22	September 30, 1995*	Araneta Coliseum	La Salle	88–78
23	October 4, 1995*	Araneta Coliseum	UST	66–62
24	October 7, 1995*	Araneta Coliseum	UST	67–64
25	August 17, 1996	Ninoy Aquino Stadium	La Salle	63–60^{OT}
26	September 17, 1996	Rizal Memorial Coliseum	La Salle	72–61
27	October 5, 1996*	Araneta Coliseum	UST	65–60
28	October 8, 1996*	Araneta Coliseum	UST	57–54
29	August 16, 1997	Ninoy Aquino Stadium	La Salle	64–57
30	September 27, 1997	Loyola Center	UST	70–58
31	October 2, 1997^	Araneta Coliseum	La Salle	82–73
32	October 4, 1997^	Araneta Coliseum	La Salle	74–72^{OT}
33	July 26, 1998	Ninoy Aquino Stadium	La Salle	76–62^{OT}
34	August 22, 1998	Ninoy Aquino Stadium	UST	66–63
35	October 1, 1998^	Araneta Coliseum	UST	55–51
36	October 3, 1998^	Araneta Coliseum	La Salle	56–51
37	July 17, 1999	Loyola Center	UST	61–59
38	August 28, 1999	Loyola Center	La Salle	78–69
39	Sep 1999≠	Loyola Center	#1 La Salle	84–79
40	September 30, 1999*	PhilSports Arena	UST	62–60
41	October 2, 1999*	PhilSports Arena	La Salle	81–74
42	October 9, 1999*	PhilSports Arena	La Salle	78–75^{OT}
43	August 10, 2000	Ninoy Aquino Stadium	La Salle	59–55
44	August 24, 2000	Blue Eagle Gym	La Salle	67–59
45	September 24, 2000^	Araneta Coliseum	La Salle	65–62
46	July 26, 2001	PhilSports Arena	La Salle	87–73
47	September 6, 2001	Blue Eagle Gym	La Salle	64–62
48	July 27, 2002	Rizal Memorial Coliseum	La Salle	81–76
49	August 22, 2002	Rizal Memorial Coliseum	La Salle	91–89^{OT}
50	September 19, 2002^	Araneta Coliseum	La Salle	97–84
51	~~July 12, 2003~~	Araneta Coliseum	La Salle	90–86 (Note: La Salle's wins from 2003 to 2005 were later forfeited after La Salle admitted it unknowingly fielded two ineligible players during that time period. Six La Salle wins from the 2003 to 2005 seasons were forfeited, but this only affected the championships, moreover nullity of title does not imply a win column to the opposition.)
52	~~August 23, 2003~~	Blue Eagle Gym	La Salle	71–66
53	~~July 29, 2004~~	Araneta Coliseum	La Salle	79–75
54	~~August 29, 2004~~	PhilSports Arena	La Salle	86–77
55	~~July 28, 2005~~	Araneta Coliseum	La Salle	98–78
56	~~August 18, 2005~~	Blue Eagle Gym	La Salle	98–72
57	July 26, 2007	Araneta Coliseum	La Salle	90–86^{OT}
58	August 11, 2007	Araneta Coliseum	UST	81–73^{OT}
59	July 17, 2008	PhilSports Arena	La Salle	85–84
60	August 28, 2008	Araneta Coliseum	La Salle	81–79
61	August 2, 2009	Araneta Coliseum	La Salle	101–92^{2OT}
62	September 3, 2009	Araneta Coliseum	La Salle	68–64
63	August 1, 2010	PhilSports Arena	La Salle	61–53
64	September 2, 2010	Araneta Coliseum	La Salle	78–69
65	August 11, 2011	Smart Araneta Coliseum	La Salle	74–71
66	August 25, 2011	Smart Araneta Coliseum	UST	60–52
67	August 4, 2012	SM Mall of Asia Arena	UST	84–82^{2OT}
68	August 29, 2012	SM Mall of Asia Arena	La Salle	53–51
69	June 29, 2013	SM Mall of Asia Arena	UST	63–58^{OT}
70	September 14, 2013	SM Mall of Asia Arena	La Salle	69–64
71	October 2, 2013*	Smart Araneta Coliseum	UST	73–72
72	October 5, 2013*	Smart Araneta Coliseum	La Salle	77–70
73	October 12, 2013*	SM Mall of Asia Arena	La Salle	71–69^{OT}
74	August 10, 2014	SM Mall of Asia Arena	La Salle	83–70
75	September 6, 2014	SM Mall of Asia Arena	La Salle	67–60
76	September 30, 2015	SM Mall of Asia Arena	UST	77–61
77	October 11, 2015	Smart Araneta Coliseum	UST	81–79
78	September 14, 2016	SM Mall of Asia Arena	La Salle	100–62
79	October 23, 2016	Smart Araneta Coliseum	La Salle	99–56
80	September 30, 2017	Smart Araneta Coliseum	La Salle	115–86
81	October 29, 2017	SM Mall of Asia Arena	La Salle	94–59
82	October 3, 2018	SM Mall of Asia Arena	La Salle	99–72
83	November 3, 2018	Ynares Center	La Salle	110–69
84	September 28, 2019	SM Mall of Asia Arena	La Salle	92–77
85	October 23, 2019	Smart Araneta Coliseum	La Salle	80–79
86	April 2, 2022	SM Mall of Asia Arena	La Salle	75–66
87	April 19, 2022	SM Mall of Asia Arena	La Salle	112–83
88	October 5, 2022	PhilSports Arena	La Salle	83–63
89	November 30, 2022	Smart Araneta Coliseum	La Salle	77–72
90	October 7, 2023	Smart Araneta Coliseum	La Salle	91–71
91	October 25, 2023	SM Mall of Asia Arena	La Salle	100–69
92	September 29, 2024	Smart Araneta Coliseum	La Salle	88–67
93	October 16, 2024	SM Mall of Asia Arena	La Salle	94–87^{OT}
94	September 27, 2025	Smart Araneta Coliseum	UST	93–84
95	October 25, 2025	SM Mall of Asia Arena	La Salle	86–77
96	September 16, 2026	SM Mall of Asia Arena	UST	80–75
97	October 25, 2026	Blue Eagle Gym	La Salle	92–80
Series: La Salle leads 68–29
(*) = finals games; (^) = semifinals; (≠) = seeding playoffs; (—) = forfeits

=== UAAP Final Four rankings ===
For comparison, these are the elimination round rankings of these two teams since the Final Four format was introduced in UAAP Season 56 (1993–94).

==== Seniors' division ====
A.Y.	La Salle	UST
1993–1994	3rd	1st
1994–1995	1st	3rd
1995–1996	2nd	1st
1996–1997	1st	2nd
1997–1998	3rd	2nd
1998–1999	1st	4th
1999–2000	1st	2nd
2000–2001	1st	4th
2001–2002	1st	6th
2002–2003	1st	4th
2003–2004	~~4th~~ ^{a}	6th
2004–2005	~~2nd~~ ^{a}	7th
2005–2006	~~2nd~~ ^{a}	6th
2006–2007		3rd
2007–2008	2nd	4th
2008–2009	2nd	5th
2009–2010	6th	4th
2010–2011	4th	7th
2011–2012	6th	4th
2012–2013	4th	2nd
2013–2014	2nd	4th
2014–2015	3rd	6th
2015–2016	5th	1st
2016–2017	1st	8th
2017–2018	2nd	8th
2018–2019	5th	6th
2019–2020	5th	4th
2021–2022	3rd	7th
2022–2023	5th	8th
2023–2024	2nd	8th
2024–2025	1st	3rd
2025–2026	4th	3rd

Finished as the champion
Finished as the 1st runner-up
Finished as the 2nd runner-up
Finished as the 3rd runner-up
Suspended

a.La Salle admitted to have unknowingly fielded two ineligible players for the previous years from 2003 to 2005. However, the admission was made months after learning about the ineligibility. The UAAP Board forfeited their 2004–05 championship title and had to return their trophy. As a result, FEU was awarded the men's basketball championship for the 2004–05 season. The Green Archers' team standings from 2003 to 2005 were revoked and La Salle was suspended in the 2006–07 season from all UAAP events. Six La Salle wins from the 2003 to 2005 seasons were forfeited, but this only affected the championships, moreover nullity of title does not imply a win column to the opposition.

== Women's volleyball ==
Both teams are expected to meet at least two times per year in UAAP volleyball tournaments.

La Salle victories	UST victories

No.	Date	Location	Winner	Score
1	July 25, 1987	Rizal Multi-purpose Arena	UST	3–0
2	September 13, 1987	Rizal Multi-purpose Arena	UST	3–0
3	July 24, 1988	Rizal Multi-purpose Arena	UST	3–0
4	September 4, 1988	La Salle Taft Gym	UST	3–0
5	August 20, 1989	UP College of Human Kinetics	UST	3–0
6	September 21, 1990	FEU Gym	UST	3–1
7	August 30, 1992	UP College of Human Kinetics	UST	3–0
8	August 12, 1993		UST	3–0
9	September 1, 1993		UST	3–0
10	August 4, 1994		UST	3–0
11	September 18, 1994	UP College of Human Kinetics	UST	3–0
12	August 10, 1995	UP College of Human Kinetics	UST	3–0
13	August 22, 1995		La Salle	3–2
14	July 21, 1996	Ninoy Aquino Stadium	UST	3–0
15	August 29, 1996	La Salle Taft Gym	UST	3–0
16	July 23, 1997	Ninoy Aquino Stadium	UST	3–0
17	Sep 1997	Ninoy Aquino Stadium	UST	3–0
18	September 13, 1998	UP College of Human Kinetics	La Salle	3–1
19	July 18, 1999	UP College of Human Kinetics	La Salle	3–0
20	Jul 2001	UP College of Human Kinetics	La Salle	3–0
21	Aug 2001	UP College of Human Kinetics	UST	3–0
22	August 4, 2002	UP College of Human Kinetics	UST	3–0
23	September 3, 2002	UP College of Human Kinetics	La Salle	3–1
24	July 30, 2003	UP College of Human Kinetics	La Salle	3–1
25	September 7, 2003	UP College of Human Kinetics	La Salle	3–0
26	September 28, 2003^	UP College of Human Kinetics	La Salle	3–1
27	October 1, 2003^	UP College of Human Kinetics	La Salle	3–1
28	July 25, 2004	UP College of Human Kinetics	La Salle	3–2
29	September 25, 2004	UP College of Human Kinetics	La Salle	3–0
30	August 14, 2005	UP College of Human Kinetics	La Salle	3–0
31	August 25, 2005	UP College of Human Kinetics	UST	3–2
32	September 24, 2005^	UP College of Human Kinetics	La Salle	3–0
33	January 13, 2008	Blue Eagle Gym	UST	3–1
34	February 6, 2008	Blue Eagle Gym	UST	3–1
35	December 10, 2008	Blue Eagle Gym	La Salle	3–0
36	January 18, 2009	The Arena in San Juan	La Salle	3–0
37	December 8, 2009	Filoil Flying V Arena	La Salle	3–2
38	February 14, 2010	Filoil Flying V Arena	UST	3–2
39	February 24, 2010*	Filoil Flying V Arena	UST	3–1
40	February 27, 2010*	Filoil Flying V Arena	UST	3–1

No.	Date	Location	Winner	Score
41	January 12, 2011	Filoil Flying V Arena	La Salle	3–0
42	February 13, 2011	Filoil Flying V Arena	La Salle	3–2
43	February 23, 2011*	Filoil Flying V Arena	La Salle	3–2
44	February 26, 2011*	Filoil Flying V Arena	La Salle	3–0
45	January 8, 2012	Filoil Flying V Arena	La Salle	3–2
46	January 29, 2012	Filoil Flying V Arena	La Salle	3–0
47	December 2, 2012	Filoil Flying V Arena	UST	3–2
48	January 26, 2013	Filoil Flying V Arena	La Salle	3–0
49	December 8, 2013	Filoil Flying V Arena	La Salle	3–0
50	February 8, 2014	Filoil Flying V Arena	La Salle	3–0
51	November 30, 2014	Filoil Flying V Arena	La Salle	3–0
52	February 4, 2015	Filoil Flying V Arena	La Salle	3–0
53	March 2, 2016	Filoil Flying V Centre	UST	3–0
54	March 12, 2016	Filoil Flying V Centre	La Salle	3–0
55	February 11, 2017	Filoil Flying V Centre	La Salle	3–1
56	March 29, 2017	Filoil Flying V Centre	La Salle	3–0
57	April 22, 2017^	Smart Araneta Coliseum	La Salle	3–1
58	February 3, 2018	SM Mall of Asia Arena	La Salle	3–2
59	April 8, 2018	Filoil Flying V Centre	La Salle	3–0
60	March 6, 2019	Filoil Flying V Centre	UST	3–0
61	March 31, 2019	Mall of Asia Arena	La Salle	3–1
62	May 1, 2019≠	Filoil Flying V Centre	#2 UST	3–1
63	May 5, 2019^	SM Mall of Asia Arena	UST	3–2
64	May 12, 2022	SM Mall of Asia Arena	UST	3–2
65	June 5, 2022	SM Mall of Asia Arena	La Salle	3–1
66	February 26, 2023	SM Mall of Asia Arena	La Salle	3–2
67	April 2, 2023	Smart Araneta Coliseum	UST	3–1
68	May 3, 2023^	Smart Araneta Coliseum	La Salle	3–1
69	February 25, 2024	SM Mall of Asia Arena	UST	3–2
70	April 27, 2024	Smart Araneta Coliseum	UST	3–1
71	May 5, 2024^	SM Mall of Asia Arena	UST	3–2
72	February 26, 2025	SM Mall of Asia Arena	UST	3–2
73	March 29, 2025	Smart Araneta Coliseum	La Salle	3–2
74	April 30, 2025≠	SM Mall of Asia Arena	#2 La Salle	3–1
75	May 3, 2025^	Smart Araneta Coliseum	La Salle	3–1
76	February 22, 2026	SM Mall of Asia Arena	La Salle	3–0
77	March 25, 2026	Smart Araneta Coliseum	La Salle	3–1
Series: La Salle leads 42–35
(*) = finals games; (^) = semifinals; (≠) = seeding playoffs

== See also ==
- Ateneo–La Salle rivalry
- Battle of Katipunan
- Battle of the East
- UP–UST rivalry
