= UAAP Season 17 men's basketball tournament =

Basketball competition in the Philippines

1954 UAAP season
- Host school: University of Santo Tomas
Men's Finals	G1	Wins
FEU Tamaraws	36	0
NU Bulldogs	41	1
- Duration: September 19, 1954
- Arena(s): Rizal Memorial Coliseum
- Winning coach: Leonardo "Skip" Guinto

The 1954 UAAP men's basketball tournament was the 17th year of the men's tournament of the University Athletic Association of the Philippines (UAAP)'s basketball championship. Hosted by University of Santo Tomas, the NU Bulldogs defeated the FEU Tamaraws in a single game finals taking their first UAAP men's basketball championship since the league's inception in 1938. This was the only title of NU until they won their second crown 60 years later in 2014.

== Finals ==
After 16 lean and hungry years, the NU Bulldogs finally wins their first cage title. Coach Skip Guinto's determined Bulldogs battered and tore their way to gain the crown in the expense of the Tamaraws of Far Eastern U by the low final count of 41-36.

The two standouts of the league made it a rare rip-roaring finish for some 9,000 fans at the Rizal Memorial Coliseum. They battled it out tensely all the way, and the issue was up in the air until the closing minutes of play.

In the brilliant finish, Bulldogs Antonio Villamor and A. de Jesus accounted for the difference. The two veteran Nationals broke the defense of the opposition with neat interceptions and timely shots to pull their team out of the fire and clinch the thrilling ball game.

It was a Tamaraw show for fully three quarters of play. In the final 10 minutes, the driving and battering game of the Bulldogs paid off. Villamor and De Jesus tied the count at 31-all and at 32-all. Then, with only five minutes to go, De Jesus scored a series of four free shots to give the Nats their first real lead which maintained to the end.

Preceded by Season 16 (1953)	UAAP basketball seasons Season 17 (1954) basketball	Succeeded by Season 18 (1955)
