= Bert Flores =

Filipino basketball coach (born 1968)

FEU Tamaraws
- Position: Assistant coach
- League: UAAP

Personal information
- Born: October 27, 1968 (age 58)
- Coaching career: 2005–present

Career history

Coaching
- 2005–2007: FEU (men)
- 2007–2010: FEU (men) (assistant)
- 2010–2013: FEU (men)
- 2013–2024: FEU (women)
- 2024–present: FEU (men) (assistant)

Career highlights
- As head coach: UAAP Senior's champion (2005)

Bert Flores (born October 27, 1968) is a Filipino collegiate coach who serves as an assistant coach of the FEU Tamaraws of the University Athletic Association of the Philippines (UAAP).

== Career ==
Flores served as manager of the FEU Tamaraws' basketball team until 2005, when he was appointed as head coach. He steered the Tamaraws to win the championship that year with a Finals revenge against La Salle. After a dismal performance, he focused on being the manager, consultant and assistant coach until 2010, when he was reappointed again and steered the Tamaraws to a finals appearance, and served until 2013.

After his men's basketball team stint, Flores served as athletic coordinator, overseeing the women's volleyball while coaching the women's basketball team. He coached the women's team until 2024.

He currently works as FEU Tamaraws' men's team assistant coach.

== Coaching record ==
=== Men's collegiate ===
| Season | Team | Elimination round | | | | | Playoffs | | | | |
| Season | Team | GP | W | L | PCT | Finish | PG | W | L | PCT | Results |
|---|---|---|---|---|---|---|---|---|---|---|---|
| 2005 | FEU | 14 | 12 | 2 | .857 | 1st | 3 | 3 | 0 | 1.000 | Champions |
| 2006 | FEU | 14 | 5 | 7 | .417 | 5th | — | — | — | — | Eliminated |
| 2011 | FEU | 14 | 9 | 5 | .643 | 3rd | 4 | 2 | 2 | .500 | Runner-up |
| 2012 | FEU | 14 | 9 | 5 | .643 | 5th | — | — | — | — | Eliminated |
| Totals | | 56 | 35 | 19 | .648 | | 7 | 5 | 2 | .714 | 1 championship |

| Preceded by Koy Banal | FEU Tamaraws men's basketball head coach 2005–2006 | Succeeded by Glenn Capacio |
| Preceded by Glenn Capacio | FEU Tamaraws men's basketball head coach 2011–2012 | Succeeded by Nash Racela |
