= UAAP Season 66 men's basketball tournament =

Basketball competition in the Philippines

UAAP Season 66
- Host school: Ateneo de Manila University
Men's Finals	G1	G2	Wins
Ateneo Blue Eagles	65	56	0
FEU Tamaraws	83	69	2
- Duration: October 2 to 5
- Arena(s): Araneta Coliseum
- Finals MVP: Arwind Santos
- Winning coach: Koy Banal
- Semifinalists: UE Red Warriors; De La Salle Green Archers
- TV network(s): Studio 23 and TFC

The UAAP Season 66 men's basketball tournament refers to the men's basketball tournament of UAAP Season 66 (2003–04 season) of the University Athletic Association of the Philippines (UAAP). The tournament was hosted by Ateneo de Manila University. ABS-CBN covered the games on Studio 23.

After a UAAP Board decision that upheld the UE Red Warriors' protest against the DLSU Green Archers, three teams ended tied for first after the elimination round. By virtue of having the superior point differential from games among the tied teams, the defending champions Ateneo Blue Eagles secured the #1 seed; the FEU Tamaraws defeated UE in the second-seed playoff in a virtual game one of a best-of-3 series. Ateneo needed their twice-to-beat advantage to outlast La Salle in a fight-marred series to advance to the Finals, while FEU needed one game to eliminate a stubborn UE team. In the Finals, FEU coach Koy Banal led the team to victory over a tired Ateneo team coached by his brother Joel to win FEU's first UAAP men's basketball championship since 1997.

UE's James Yap was named Most Valuable Player (MVP) of the season. Arwind Santos was named Finals MVP.

== Coaches ==
=== Current coaches ===
- Adamson Soaring Falcons – Luigi Trillo
- Ateneo Blue Eagles – Joel Banal
- De La Salle Green Archers – Franz Pumaren
- FEU Tamaraws – Koy Banal
- NU Bulldogs – Rico Perez
- UE Red Warriors – Boyzie Zamar
- UP Fighting Maroons – Lito Vergara
- UST Growling Tigers – Aric del Rosario

=== Coaching changes ===
Team	Outgoing coach	Replaced by
NU Bulldogs	Manny Dandan	Rico Perez
UP Fighting Maroons	Allan Gregorio	Lito Vergara

== Elimination round ==
Pos	Team	W	L	PCT	GB	Qualification
1	Ateneo Blue Eagles (H)	11	3	.786 (Note: Head-to-head record: Ateneo 2–2, FEU 2–2, UE 2–2 (Ateneo +21, UE –5, FEU –16); second-seed playoff: FEU 80–75 UE)	—	Twice-to-beat in the semifinals
2	FEU Tamaraws	11	3	.786	—	Twice-to-beat in the semifinals
3	UE Red Warriors (Note: La Salle originally won against UE in the second round, but the UAAP Board awarded UE the win after instant replay showed that the buzzer beater that gave De La Salle the victory was not yet in the air when time expired.)	11	3	.786	—	Twice-to-win in the semifinals
4	De La Salle Green Archers (Note: This "final" team standings is overturned when La Salle forfeited their games after the Season 68 was over. See Suspension of De La Salle University for details.)	7	7	.500	4	Twice-to-win in the semifinals
5	Adamson Falcons	5	9	.357 (Note: Head-to-head record: Adamson 1–1 UST (Adamson 0, UST 0); overall point differential: Adamson –59, UST –62)	6	
6	UST Growling Tigers	5	9	.357	6	
7	UP Fighting Maroons	3	11	.214 (Note: Head-to-head record: UP 1–1 NU (UP +4))	8	
8	NU Bulldogs	3	11	.214	8	

Rules for classification: 1) winning percentage; 2) if tied for #2 or #4, one-game playoff; 3) head-to-head record; 4) head-to-head point differential; 5) overall point differential
(H) Hosts

=== Match-up results ===
	Round 1							Round 2						
Team ╲ Game	1	2	3	4	5	6	7	8	9	10	11	12	13	14
Adamson	FEU school colors	UE school colors	UP school colors	Ateneo school colors	UST school colors	NU school colors	La Salle school colors	UP school colors	Ateneo school colors	NU school colors	UST school colors	FEU school colors	La Salle school colors	UE school colors
Ateneo	UE school colors	FEU school colors	UST school colors	NU school colors	Adamson school colors	UP school colors	La Salle school colors	UE school colors	Adamson school colors	FEU school colors	NU school colors	UP school colors	UST school colors	La Salle school colors
La Salle	UST school colors	UP school colors	UE school colors	FEU school colors	NU school colors	Ateneo school colors	Adamson school colors	FEU school colors	UST school colors	UP school colors	NU school colors	Adamson school colors	Ateneo school colors	UE school colors
FEU	Adamson school colors	Ateneo school colors	NU school colors	UST school colors	La Salle school colors	UE school colors	UP school colors	La Salle school colors	NU school colors	Ateneo school colors	UE school colors	Adamson school colors	UP school colors	UST school colors
NU	UP school colors	UST school colors	FEU school colors	Ateneo school colors	La Salle school colors	UE school colors	Adamson school colors	UST school colors	FEU school colors	Adamson school colors	Ateneo school colors	La Salle school colors	UE school colors	UP school colors
UE	Ateneo school colors	Adamson school colors	La Salle school colors	FEU school colors	NU school colors	UST school colors	UP school colors	Ateneo school colors	UP school colors	FEU school colors	NU school colors	UST school colors	Adamson school colors	La Salle school colors
UP	NU school colors	La Salle school colors	Adamson school colors	Ateneo school colors	UST school colors	FEU school colors	UE school colors	Adamson school colors	UE school colors	La Salle school colors	Ateneo school colors	FEU school colors	NU school colors	UST school colors
UST	La Salle school colors	NU school colors	Ateneo school colors	FEU school colors	Adamson school colors	UP school colors	UE school colors	NU school colors	La Salle school colors	Adamson school colors	Ateneo school colors	UE school colors	FEU school colors	UP school colors

= Win; = OT win; = Loss; = OT loss

=== Scores ===
Results on top and to the right of the dashes are for first-round games; those to the bottom and to the left of it are second-round games.

Teams	AdU	AdMU	DLSU	FEU	NU	UE	UP	UST
Adamson Soaring Falcons	—	62–70	61–81	53–57	74–70**	61–74	83–80	60–57
Ateneo Blue Eagles	69–55	—	82–68	62–73	63–57	68–69	70–68	69–65
De La Salle Green Archers	82–74	89–98	—	72–74	92–85*	84–65	67–58	88–75
FEU Tamaraws	–	63–87	76–74	—	71–49	64–62	65–50	45–51
NU Bulldogs	67–85	76–62	80–59	56–69	—	75–79	74–70	77–84
UE Red Warriors	82–76	67–76	64–62 (Note: UE put the result of their 65–64 second round game loss against La Salle under protest as UE contended that Junjun Cabatu's last-second three-point buzzer beater for La Salle was made after the end-game buzzer sounded. After the UAAP Technical Committee, citing a review of the tapes that showed the ball was until in Cabatu's fingertips as time expired, concluded that indeed the ball was released after time expired, the UAAP Board upheld UE's protest and awarded UE the 64–62 victory. This earned them a playoff for the second seed against FEU as they ended up in a three-way tie for first place. Ateneo, with the superior point differential, won the #1 seed.)	77–72	80–69	—	75–65	73–69
UP Fighting Maroons	66–68*	53–56	80–70	61–67	75–67	61–68	—	73–55
UST Growling Tigers	64–61	–	66–71	58–71	83–78	69–76	92–89*	—

Source: Philippine Daily Inquirer
Legend: Blue = left column team win; Red = top row team win.
Matches with lighter background shading were decided after overtime.

== Second seed playoff ==
Since Ateneo, FEU and UE finished the eliminations with identical 11-3 cards, the quotient system was used. Ateneo emerged with the best quotient among the three, so UE and FEU figured out for a playoff game for the second seed to determine which team will clinch the twice-to-beat advantage that goes along with it, leading to a de facto first game of a best-of-three series. The winner only has to win once in the series, while the loser have to win twice to qualify for the Finals.

Studio 23

September 21
4:00 p.m.

FEU Tamaraws	80–75	UE Red Warriors
Scoring by quarter: 24–19, 20–13, 20–17, 16–26
Pts: Dennis Miranda 16		Pts: James Yap 27
FEU wins the twice to beat advantage

Araneta Coliseum, Quezon City

UE fell behind by as much as 18 points in the fourth quarter, but caught up with FEU due to their trapping defense. Olan Omiping hit a shot to start a 21–4 UE run, that was ended by RJ Masbang when he scored on a three-point play to cut FEU's lead to one point. Denok Miranda and Mark Isip initiated a 5–0 FEU run when UE coach Boyzie Zamar benched Masbang for shooter Charles Tan, who turned the ball over and fouled Santos that caused a three-point play to put FEU up by eight points. Up by three points, Santos tipped-in a Miranda miss to seal the win for FEU and the #2 seed.

== Bracket ==
Semifinals (Top 2 twice-to-beat)
1	Ateneo	72	74
4	La Salle	76*	68
2	FEU	67
3	UE	63

Finals (Best-of-three playoff)
1	Ateneo	65	53
2	FEU	83	69

*Overtime

== Semifinals ==
FEU and Ateneo have the twice-to-beat advantage. They only have to win once, while their opponents, twice, to progress.

=== (1) Ateneo vs. (4) La Salle ===
==== Game 1 ====
Studio 23

September 25
4:00 p.m.

Ateneo Blue Eagles	72–76 (OT)	De La Salle Green Archers
Scoring by quarter: 23–23, 19–11, 9–16, 14–15, Overtime: 7–11
Pts: Wesley Gonzales 20		Pts: Joseph Yeo 31; Rebs: Araña, Gaco 8 each Asts: Joseph Yeo 4
La Salle extends series

Araneta Coliseum, Quezon City

With former Chicago Bulls player Scott Burrell at court side, Ateneo led for much of the game; La Salle top scorer Mark Cardona was injured. La Salle's Joseph Yeo led the Archers back into the game; Jerwin Gaco scored on a put-back after a La Salle miss to force overtime. With 1:31 left in the overtime period, a bench-clearing brawl erupted after Gaco bumped LA Tenorio after a loose-ball scramble. Slo-mo replays later showed Tenorio sneaked in a punch to Gaco's side. After commissioner Joe Lipa and Araneta Coliseum personnel restored order, referees thrown out Ateneo's Magnum Membrere and La Salle's Ryan Araña. Yeo, who scored 31 points, and JV Casio led La Salle at the end of overtime to extend the series.

==== Game 2 ====
Studio 23

September 30
3:00 p.m.

Ateneo Blue Eagles	74–68	De La Salle Green Archers
Scoring by quarter: 21–21, 23–12, 14–22, 16–13
Pts: Larry Fonacier 20; Rebs: Larry Fonacier 11; Asts: Larry Fonacier 3		Pts: Joseph Yeo 26
Ateneo wins series in two games

Araneta Coliseum, Quezon City

After the fracas at their first semifinals game, Tenorio was suspended. This gave Macky Escalona Tenorio's starting point-guard spot. Cardona, who was dressed to play, was not fielded in by La Salle coach Franz Pumaren. At the end of the first half, a commotion broke out between the two teams in the Araneta Coliseum tunnel as they went to their respective locker rooms. At the stands, there were at least three incidents of shoving, punching and debris-throwing involving officials and supporters. Lipa ordered a certain fan to be expelled after having a word war with the Ateneo supporters. Midway through the third quarter, Ateneo led 47–33 but La Salle crept up. At the fourth quarter, as Ateneo's shot clock was running out, center Paolo Bugia made an improbable three-pointer to pad their lead 63–59. Larry Fonacier scored six straight points in the final 61 seconds to put Ateneo up for good; after Joseph Yeo scored on a three-pointer to cut Ateneo's lead 71–68, Fonacier made two free-throws off Cabatu's unsportsmanlike foul to put them up by five points. A last-ditch foul from Casio on Macky Escalona settled the final score as Escalona split his free-throws.

At the end of the game, another scuffle between the supporters broke out, and included former Ateneo players Enrico Villanueva, Rainier Sison and Andrew Cruz; both Sison and Cruz suffered bruises. Uniformed policemen, including the SWAT team, and Araneta Coliseum security guards restored order.

=== (2) FEU vs. (3) UE ===
Studio 23

September 25
2:00 p.m.

FEU Tamaraws	67–63	UE Red Warriors
Scoring by quarter: 19–17, 12–27, 21–11, 15–8
Pts: Gerard Jones 18		Pts: Olan Omiping 20
FEU wins series in one game

Araneta Coliseum, Quezon City

FEU and UE were locked in a close game until the final minutes. Paul Artadi scored a three-pointer to put the Red Warriors up 61–60. RJ Rizada and Gerald Jones scored baskets late in the game to eliminate the Red Warriors anew.

== Finals ==
In the finals, defending champion Ateneo coach Joel Banal faced his brother, FEU coach Koy.

=== Game 1 ===
Studio 23

October 2
4:00 p.m.

FEU Tamaraws	83–65	Ateneo Blue Eagles
FEU leads series 1–0

Araneta Coliseum, Quezon City

Ateneo threatened to blow the game wide open in the first quarter, but FEU responded with defense that gave Ateneo few easy points. The Tamaraws grabbed rebounds that led into easy fast break points to cruise to an easy win to lead the best-of-3 series 1–0.

=== Game 2 ===
Studio 23

October 5
4:00 p.m.

FEU Tamaraws	69–56	Ateneo Blue Eagles
Scoring by quarter: 17–17, 22–9, 10–13, 20–17
Pts: Cesar Catli 16; Rebs: Denok Miranda 11		Pts: Larry Fonacier 17; Rebs: Larry Fonacier 7
FEU wins series 2–0

Araneta Coliseum, Quezon City

- Finals Most Valuable Player: Arwind Santos (FEU Tamaraws)

FEU led for most of the game, with Cesar Catli, RJ Rizada and Rhagnee Singco scoring baskets to increase FEU's lead 39–26. Ateneo cut the lead 46–39 near the end of the third quarter thanks to Larry Fonacier's free-throws. However, Jeffrei Chan scored on a three-point shot to increase FEU's lead to ten to end the quarter. At the start of the fourth quarter, FEU led for good, 56–39, after a Gerald Jones shot. The Eagles threatened anew late in the fourth, but Dennis Miranda converted a three-point shot with 2:31 left to put the Eagles away, 63–50. FEU won their first UAAP men's basketball championship since 1997.

== Broadcast notes ==
=== UAAP Final Four ===
September 25, 2003

Game	Play-by-play	Analyst	Courtside reporters	Team
Game 1	Boom Gonzalez	Randy Sacdalan	Jamela Alindongan (FEU) and Eugene Lalaan (UE)	FEU vs. UE
Game 1	Jude Turcuato	Ryan Gregorio	Hazel Aguilon (DLSU) and Carmi Tanjutco (ADMU)	DLSU vs. ADMU

September 30, 2003

Game	Play-by-play	Analyst	Courtside reporters	Team
Game 2	Boom Gonzalez	Randy Sacdalan	Carmi Tanjutco (ADMU) and Hazel Aguilon (DLSU)	DLSU vs. ADMU

=== UAAP Finals ===
Game	Play-by-play	Analyst	Courtside reporters
Game 1	Jude Turcuato	Randy Sacdalan	Jamela Alindongan (FEU) and Carmi Tanjutco (ADMU)
Game 2	Jude Turcuato	Ronnie Magsanoc	Jamela Alindongan (FEU) and Carmi Tanjutco (ADMU)

== Awards ==
The awards were given out prior to Game 2 at the Araneta Coliseum:

- Most Valuable Player: James Yap (UE Red Warriors)
- Rookie of the Year: JV Casio (De La Salle Green Archers)
- Mythical Five:
  - James Yap (UE Red Warriors)
  - Paul Artadi (UE Red Warriors)
  - Rey Mendoza (NU Bulldogs)
  - Rich Alvarez (Ateneo Blue Eagles)
  - Arwind Santos (FEU Tamaraws)

== See also ==
- NCAA Season 79 basketball tournaments

Preceded by Season 65 (2002)	UAAP men's basketball seasons Season 66 (2003) basketball	Succeeded by Season 67 (2004)
