= List of UAAP seasons =

This is a list of seasons of the University Athletic Association of the Philippines (UAAP).

== List ==
Season	Academic year	Host	Theme
1	1938–39		
2	1939–40		
3	1940–41		
4 (Note: Not held due to World War II)	1941–42	—N/a	
5	1942–43	—N/a	
6	1943–44	—N/a	
7	1944–45	—N/a	
8	1945–46	—N/a	
9	1946–47	University of Santo Tomas	
10	1947–48	Far Eastern University	
11	1948–49	National University	
12	1949–50	University of the Philippines	
13	1950–51	University of Santo Tomas	
14	1951–52	Far Eastern University	
15	1952–53	National University	
16	1953–54	University of the Philippines	
17	1954–55	University of Santo Tomas	
18	1955–56	Far Eastern University	
19	1956–57	National University	
20	1957–58	University of the Philippines	
21	1958–59	University of the East	
22	1959–60	University of Santo Tomas	
23	1960–61	Manila Central University	
24	1961–62	Far Eastern University	
25	1962–63	National University	
26	1963–64	University of the Philippines	
27	1964–65	University of the East	
28	1965–66	University of Santo Tomas	
29	1966–67	Far Eastern University	
30	1967–68	National University	
31	1968–69	University of the Philippines	
32	1969–70	University of the East	
33	1970–71	University of Santo Tomas	
34	1971–72	Far Eastern University	
35	1972–73	National University	
36	1973–74	University of the Philippines	
37	1974–75	Adamson University	
38	1975–76	University of the East	
39	1976–77	University of Santo Tomas	
40	1977–78	Far Eastern University	
41	1978–79	National University	
42	1979–80	University of the Philippines	
43	1980–81	Ateneo de Manila University	
44	1981–82	Adamson University	
45	1982–83	University of the East	
46	1983–84	University of the Philippines	
47	1984–85	University of Santo Tomas	
48	1985–86	Far Eastern University	
49	1986–87	National University	
50	1987–88	Ateneo de Manila University	
51	1988–89	De La Salle University	
52	1989–90	Adamson University	
53	1990–91	University of the East	
54	1991–92	University of the Philippines	
55	1992–93	University of Santo Tomas	
56	1993–94	Far Eastern University	
57	1994–95	National University	
58	1995–96	Ateneo de Manila University	
59	1996–97	De La Salle University	The New Generation of Sports Excellence
60	1997–98	Adamson University	
61	1998–99	University of the East	The Filipino Spirit Shining Through Sports
62	1999–2000	University of the Philippines	Bigyang Katuparan, 'Sang Kalikasan
63	2000–01	University of Santo Tomas	Recreating the Value of Friendship through Sports
64	2001–02	Far Eastern University	Sama-samang Harapin ang Pagsubok
65	2002–03	National University	Youth of Today, Future of Tomorrow, Searching for a New Beginning
66	2003–04	Ateneo de Manila University	Olympism: Blending Sports with Culture and Education
67	2004–05	De La Salle University	Animo UAAP: Shooting for the Stars
68	2005–06	Adamson University	Soar Higher!
69	2006–07	University of the East	Achieving Excellence in Sports Through Unity, Harmony and Commitment
70	2007–08	University of Santo Tomas	Winners All, Recreating the Value of Honesty through Sports
71	2008–09	University of the Philippines	Filipino Leadership Through Sports Excellence
72	2009–10	Far Eastern University	One color. One goal
73	2010–11	De La Salle University	Where Heroes Are Made
74	2011–12	Ateneo de Manila University	All Out, All Heart
75	2012–13	National University	Unbreakable at 75
76	2013–14	Adamson University	Greatness Never Ends
77	2014–15	University of the East	Unity in Excellence
78	2015–16	University of the Philippines	Tumitindig, Sumusulong
79	2016–17	University of Santo Tomas	Dare to Dream
80	2017–18	Far Eastern University	Go for Great
81	2018–19	National University	It All Begins Here
82 (Note: Canceled due to the COVID-19 pandemic)	2019–20	Ateneo de Manila University	All for More
83 (Note: Not held due to the COVID-19 pandemic)	2020–21	De La Salle University	Fully Alive. Champions for Life!
84 (Note: Limited number of events due to the COVID-19 pandemic)	2021–22	De La Salle University	Fully Alive. Champions for Life!
85	2022–23	Adamson University	Rise as One
86	2023–24	University of the East	Fueling the Future
87	2024–25	University of the Philippines	Stronger, Better, Together
88	2025–26	University of Santo Tomas	Strength in Motion, Hope in Action
89	2026–27	Far Eastern University	For Everyone, UAAP

=== Times hosted per university ===
University	Total
Far Eastern University	13
University of Santo Tomas	13
National University	12
University of the Philippines	12
University of the East	10
Adamson University	8
Ateneo de Manila University	6
De La Salle University	5
Manila Central University (Note: No longer a UAAP member)	1

== See also ==
- List of NCAA Philippines seasons
