= UAAP Season 71 volleyball tournaments =

Volleyball tournaments

UAAP Season 71 Seniors' Volleyball
- Host school: University of the Philippines, Diliman
Men's Finals	G1	G2	Wins
UST Growling Tigers	3	3	2
UP Fighting Maroons	0	0	0
- Duration: March 1–4, 2009
- Arena(s): The Arena in San Juan
- Finals MVP: Ray Karl Dimaculangan
- Winning coach: Emil Lontoc
- Semifinalists: De La Salle Green Archers; Ateneo Blue Eagles
- TV network(s): Studio 23
Women's Finals	G1	G2	G3	Wins
De La Salle Lady Archers	2	3	3	2
FEU Lady Tamaraws	3	1	1	1
- Duration: March 1–8, 2009
- Arena(s): The Arena in San Juan
- Finals MVP: Manilla Santos
- Winning coach: Ramil de Jesus
- Semifinalists: UST Tigresses; Adamson Lady Falcons
- TV network(s): Studio 23

UAAP Season 71 Juniors' Volleyball
- Automatic champions: Elimination round record
UE Junior Warriors	10–0 (1.000)
UST Lady Tiger Cubs	6–0 (1.000)
< Season 70	2008-09	Season 72 >

The seniors' division of the UAAP Season 71 volleyball tournaments opened December 6, 2008. Tournament host will be Far Eastern University. Tournament games will be at the Far Eastern University Gym and The Arena in San Juan.

The juniors' division tournaments were held on the first semester of the 2008-09 school year; the UE Pages and the UST Lady Tiger Cubs won all of their elimination round games in their respective divisions to clinch the championship outright.

In the men's tournament, the UST Growling Tigers also won all of their elimination round games but went through the usual the Final Four format; they beat Ateneo in three straight sets in the semifinals to formalize their entry to the Finals; they then swept the UP Fighting Maroons 2–0 in the best-of-3 Finals series without losing a set to have an immaculate 17–0 Season 71 record to successfully defend their championship.

In the women's tournament, the FEU Lady Tamaraws and La Salle Lady Archers emerged on top of the standings and beat their semifinals opponents to meet in the Finals. FEU overcame UST Tigresses which gave them their opening day loss, while La Salle beat the Adamson Lady Falcons in a rematch of their third-place playoff in the Shakey's V-League. FEU and La Salle split their elimination round games, with La Salle winning over FEU in the second round's last game to wrest the #1 seed away from the Lady Tamaraws who had held it all tournament long. After winning Game 1 in five sets, FEU lost the next two games in four sets to award La Salle their fifth UAAP women's volleyball championship.

Qualified for semifinals with twice to beat advantage
Qualified for semifinals

== Men's tournament ==
=== Elimination round ===
With UST's 14–0 sweep of the tournament, they were supposed to receive at least an automatic Finals berth but instead will go through the usual Final Four phase with the release of the playoffs schedule.

==== Team standings ====
Team	W	L	PCT	GB	Tie
UST Growling Tigers	14	0	1.000	--	
De La Salle Green Archers	10	4	.714	4	
UP Fighting Maroons	9	5	.643	5	
Ateneo Blue Eagles	9	5	.643	5	
Adamson Soaring Falcons	6	8	.429	8	2-0
FEU Tamaraws	6	8	.429	8	0-2
UE Red Warriors	2	12	.083	12	
NU Bulldogs	0	14	.000	14	

Tiebreakers:

- UP defeated Ateneo 3–2 in the third-seed game.
- Adamson defeated FEU in both of their elimination round games.

==== Schedule ====
Win	Loss

School	Round 1							Round 2						
School	1	2	3	4	5	6	7	8	9	10	11	12	13	14
AdU	UST school colors	Ateneo school colors	FEU school colors	NU school colors	UE school colors	La Salle school colors	UP school colors	UE school colors	UST school colors	NU school colors	UP school colors	La Salle school colors	Ateneo school colors	FEU school colors
ADMU	UE school colors	Adamson school colors	La Salle school colors	FEU school colors	UST school colors	UP school colors	NU school colors	UP school colors	FEU school colors	La Salle school colors	UE school colors	Adamson school colors	NU school colors	UST school colors
DLSU	NU school colors	FEU school colors	Ateneo school colors	UST school colors	UP school colors	Adamson school colors	UE school colors	UST school colors	UE school colors	Ateneo school colors	NU school colors	Adamson school colors	FEU school colors	UP school colors
FEU	UP school colors	La Salle school colors	Adamson school colors	Ateneo school colors	NU school colors	UE school colors	UST school colors	NU school colors	Ateneo school colors	UE school colors	UST school colors	UP school colors	La Salle school colors	Adamson school colors
NU	La Salle school colors	UP school colors	UE school colors	Adamson school colors	FEU school colors	UST school colors	Ateneo school colors	FEU school colors	UP school colors	Adamson school colors	La Salle school colors	UST school colors	Ateneo school colors	UE school colors
UE	Ateneo school colors	UST school colors	NU school colors	UP school colors	Adamson school colors	FEU school colors	La Salle school colors	Adamson school colors	La Salle school colors	FEU school colors	Ateneo school colors	UP school colors	UST school colors	NU school colors
UP	FEU school colors	NU school colors	UST school colors	UE school colors	La Salle school colors	Ateneo school colors	Adamson school colors	Ateneo school colors	NU school colors	UST school colors	Adamson school colors	FEU school colors	UE school colors	La Salle school colors
UST	Adamson school colors	UE school colors	UP school colors	La Salle school colors	Ateneo school colors	NU school colors	FEU school colors	La Salle school colors	Adamson school colors	UP school colors	FEU school colors	NU school colors	UE school colors	Ateneo school colors

=== Bracket ===
3rd-seed playoff
2	Ateneo	2
5	UP	3

Semifinals; Top seeds twice-to-beat
1	UST	3
4	Ateneo	0
2	La Salle	0	1
3	UP	3	3

Finals; Best-of-three series
1	UST	3	3
3	UP	0	0

=== Third-seed playoff ===
Date		Score		Set 1	Set 2	Set 3	Set 4	Set 5	Total
Feb 18	Ateneo Blue Eagles	2–3	UP Fighting Maroons	25–19	26–28	22–25	25–19	10–15	108–106

=== Semifinals ===
==== UST vs. Ateneo ====
Date		Score		Set 1	Set 2	Set 3	Set 4	Set 5	Total
Feb 21	UST Growling Tigers	3–0	Ateneo Blue Eagles	25–19	25–23	25–20	–	–	75–62
UST advances to the Finals

==== La Salle vs. UP ====
Date		Score		Set 1	Set 2	Set 3	Set 4	Set 5	Total
Feb 22	De La Salle Green Archers	0–3	UP Fighting Maroons	18–25	20–25	22–25	–	–	60–75
Feb 25	De La Salle Green Archers	1–3	UP Fighting Maroons	25–16	17–25	15–25	23–25	–	80–91
UP advances to the Finals

=== Finals ===
Date		Score		Set 1	Set 2	Set 3	Set 4	Set 5	Total
Mar 1	UST Growling Tigers	3–0	UP Fighting Maroons	25–20	25–18	25–21	–	–	75–59
Mar 4	UST Growling Tigers	3–0	UP Fighting Maroons	25–22	25–14	25–17	–	–	75–53
UST wins series 2–0

=== Awards ===
- Rookie of the Year: Duane Craig Teves (Ateneo de Manila University)
- Best attacker: Jayson Ramos (University of Santo Tomas)
- Best blocker: Lloyd Arden Belgado (University of the Philippines Diliman)
- Best setter: Gerald Magtoto (University of the Philippines Diliman)
- Best server: Ray Karl Dimaculangan (University of Santo Tomas)
- Best receiver: Henry James Pecaña (University of Santo Tomas)
- Best digger: Bernardino Lorenz Casanova (De La Salle University)
- Most valuable player: Ray Karl Dimaculangan (University of Santo Tomas)

== Women's tournament ==
=== Elimination round ===
==== Team standings ====
Team	W	L	PCT	GB	Tie
De La Salle Lady Archers	13	1	.929	--	
FEU Lady Tamaraws	12	2	.857	1	
UST Tigresses	9	5	.643	4	
Adamson Lady Falcons	9	5	.643	4	
Ateneo Lady Eagles	6	8	.429	7	
UE Lady Warriors	3	11	.214	10	
UP Lady Maroons	3	11	.214	10	
NU Lady Bulldogs	1	13	.071	12	

Tiebreakers:
- UST defeated Adamson 3–0 in the third-seed game.

==== Schedule ====
Win	Loss

School	Round 1							Round 2						
School	1	2	3	4	5	6	7	8	9	10	11	12	13	14
AdU	Ateneo school colors	NU school colors	UST school colors	La Salle school colors	UE school colors	UP school colors	FEU school colors	FEU school colors	NU school colors	La Salle school colors	UP school colors	UE school colors	Ateneo school colors	UST school colors
ADMU	Adamson school colors	UE school colors	FEU school colors	UP school colors	NU school colors	La Salle school colors	UST school colors	NU school colors	FEU school colors	UP school colors	UST school colors	La Salle school colors	Adamson school colors	UE school colors
DLSU	UP school colors	UST school colors	NU school colors	Adamson school colors	FEU school colors	Ateneo school colors	UE school colors	UST school colors	UE school colors	Adamson school colors	NU school colors	Ateneo school colors	UP school colors	FEU school colors
FEU	UST school colors	UP school colors	Ateneo school colors	NU school colors	La Salle school colors	UE school colors	Adamson school colors	Adamson school colors	Ateneo school colors	UST school colors	UE school colors	NU school colors	UP school colors	La Salle school colors
NU	UE school colors	Adamson school colors	La Salle school colors	FEU school colors	Ateneo school colors	UST school colors	UP school colors	Ateneo school colors	Adamson school colors	UE school colors	La Salle school colors	FEU school colors	UST school colors	UP school colors
UE	NU school colors	Ateneo school colors	UP school colors	UST school colors	Adamson school colors	FEU school colors	La Salle school colors	UP school colors	La Salle school colors	NU school colors	FEU school colors	UST school colors	Adamson school colors	Ateneo school colors
UP	La Salle school colors	FEU school colors	UE school colors	Ateneo school colors	UST school colors	Adamson school colors	NU school colors	UE school colors	UST school colors	Ateneo school colors	Adamson school colors	FEU school colors	La Salle school colors	NU school colors
UST	FEU school colors	La Salle school colors	Adamson school colors	UE school colors	UP school colors	NU school colors	Ateneo school colors	La Salle school colors	UP school colors	FEU school colors	Ateneo school colors	UE school colors	NU school colors	Adamson school colors

=== Bracket ===
3rd-seed playoff
2	Adamson	0
5	UST	3

Semifinals; Top seeds twice-to-beat
1	La Salle	3
4	Adamson	1
2	FEU	3
3	UST	1

Finals; Best-of-three series
1	La Salle	2	3	3
2	FEU	3	1	1

=== Third-seed playoff ===
Date		Score		Set 1	Set 2	Set 3	Set 4	Set 5	Total
Feb 18	Adamson Lady Falcons	0–3	UST Tigresses	21–25	21–25	13–25	–	–	55–75

=== Semifinals ===
==== La Salle vs. Adamson ====
Date		Score		Set 1	Set 2	Set 3	Set 4	Set 5	Total
Feb 21	De La Salle Lady Archers	3–1	Adamson Lady Falcons	25–16	23–25	25–22	25–13	–	98–76
La Salle advances to the Finals

==== FEU vs. UST ====
Date		Score		Set 1	Set 2	Set 3	Set 4	Set 5	Total
Feb 22	FEU Lady Tamaraws	3–1	UST Tigresses	25–14	19–25	25–22	25–23	–	94–84
FEU advances to the Finals

=== Finals ===
Date		Score		Set 1	Set 2	Set 3	Set 4	Set 5	Total
Mar 1	De La Salle Lady Archers	2–3	FEU Lady Tamaraws	25–16	25–27	21–25	26–24	10–15	107–107
Mar 4	De La Salle Lady Archers	3–1	FEU Lady Tamaraws	17–25	25–21	25–18	25–18	–	92–82
Mar 8	De La Salle Lady Archers	3–1	FEU Lady Tamaraws	25–19	20–25	25–21	25–21	–	95–86
La Salle wins series 2–1

=== Awards ===
- Rookie of the Year: Melissa Gohing (De La Salle University)
- Best scorer: Aiza Maizo (University of Santo Tomas)
- Best attacker: Aiza Maizo (University of Santo Tomas)
- Best blocker: Jacqueline Alarca (De La Salle University)
- Best setter: April Linor Jose (Far Eastern University)
- Best server: Macaila Irish May Morada (Far Eastern University)
- Best receiver: Manilla Santos (De La Salle University)
- Best digger: Lizlee Ann Gata-Pantone (Adamson University)
- Most valuable player: Manilla Santos (De La Salle University)

== Boys' tournament ==
With UE sweeping the elimination round, they were declared automatic champions and the playoffs were scrapped.

=== Elimination round ===
==== Team standings ====
Team	W	L	PCT	GB
UE Junior Warriors	10	0	1.000	--
Ateneo Blue Eaglets	7	3	.700	
UST Tiger Cubs	7	3	.700	
DLSZ Junior Archers				
NUNS Bullpups				
**UPIS Junior Maroons**				

Host team in boldface.

==== Last game of the eliminations ====
September 29 –
Team	1	2	3	4	Sets
Ateneo	**25**	11	27	21	**1**
**UE**	23	**25**	**29**	**25**	**3**

UE wins the championship by sweeping the tournament.

=== Awardees ===
- Most Valuable Player: Michael Reyes (UE)
- Rookie of the Year: Karl Roque (UE)

== Girls' tournament ==
With UST sweeping the elimination round, they were declared automatic champions and the playoffs were scrapped.

=== Elimination round ===
Team	W	L	PCT	GB
UST Lady Tiger Cubs	6	0	1.000	--
UE Junior Amazons				
La Salle Junior Lady Archers				
**UPIS Junior Lady Maroons**				

Host team in boldface.

=== Awardees ===
- Most Valuable Player: Alyssa Valdez (UST)
- Rookie of the Year: Jelly Buan (UST)

Preceded by Season 70 (2007–08)	UAAP volleyball tournaments Season 71 (2008–09)	Succeeded by Season 72 (2009–10)
