= UAAP Season 71 basketball tournaments =

Basketball competition in the Philippines

UAAP Season 71
- Madrama
- Host school: University of the Philippines Diliman
Men's Finals	G1	G2	Wins
Ateneo Blue Eagles	69	62	2
De La Salle Green Archers	61	51	0
- Duration: September 21–25, 2008
- Arena(s): Araneta Coliseum
- Finals MVP: Nonoy Baclao
- Winning coach: Norman Black (1st title)
- Semifinalists: FEU Tamaraws; UE Red Warriors
- TV network(s): Studio 23
Women's Finals	G1	G2	Wins
FEU Lady Tamaraws	54	52	2
UP Lady Maroons	52	46	0
- Duration: September 20–27, 2008
- Arena(s): The Arena in San Juan
- Finals MVP: Bernadette Mercado
- Winning coach: Michael Oliver
- Semifinalists: UST Growling Tigresses; Adamson Lady Falcons
- TV network(s): Studio 23
Juniors' Finals	G1	G2	Wins
Ateneo Blue Eaglets	72	71	2
FEU–D Baby Tamaraws	62	60	0
- Duration: September 20–27, 2008
- Arena(s): The Arena in San Juan
- Finals MVP: JV Dumrique
- Winning coach: Jamike Jarin (6th title)
- Semifinalists: Zobel Junior Archers; Adamson Baby Falcons
- TV network(s): Studio 23

The basketball tournaments of University Athletic Association of the Philippines (UAAP) Season 71 started on July 5, 2008, at the Araneta Coliseum with University of the Philippines, Diliman as hosts. The defending champions were the De La Salle Green Archers (men), Ateneo Lady Eagles (women) and the De La Salle Junior Archers (juniors).

Basketball Coaches Association of the Philippines president Chito Narvasa is the season's commissioner. The theme is "Filipino Leadership Through Sports Excellence".

== Men's tournament ==
=== Teams ===
Team	University	Coach
Adamson Soaring Falcons	Adamson University (AdU)	(Philippines) Leo Austria
Ateneo Blue Eagles	Ateneo de Manila University (ADMU)	(United States) Norman Black
De La Salle Green Archers	De La Salle University (DLSU)	(Philippines) Franz Pumaren
FEU Tamaraws	Far Eastern University (FEU)	(Philippines) Glenn Capacio
NU Bulldogs	National University (NU)	(Philippines) Manny Dandan
UE Red Warriors	University of the East (UE)	(Philippines) Dindo Pumaren
UP Fighting Maroons	University of the Philippines Diliman (UP)	(Philippines) Aboy Castro
UST Growling Tigers	University of Santo Tomas (UST)	(Philippines) Pido Jarencio

=== Elimination round ===
==== Team standings ====
Pos	Team	W	L	PCT	GB	Qualification
1	Ateneo Blue Eagles	13	1	.929	—	Twice-to-beat in the semifinals
2	De La Salle Green Archers	10	4	.714 (Note: Second-seed playoff: La Salle 62–59 FEU)	3	Twice-to-beat in the semifinals
3	FEU Tamaraws	10	4	.714	3	Twice-to-win in the semifinals
4	UE Red Warriors	9	5	.643	4	Twice-to-win in the semifinals
5	UST Growling Tigers	6	8	.429	7	
6	UP Fighting Maroons (H)	3	11	.214 (Note: Head-to-head record: UP 2–0 Adamson)	10	
7	Adamson Soaring Falcons	3	11	.214	10	
8	NU Bulldogs	2	12	.143	11	

Source: ABS-CBN Sports
Rules for classification: 1) winning percentage; 2) if tied for #2 or #4, one-game playoff; 3) head-to-head record; 4) head-to-head point differential; 5) overall point differential
(H) Hosts

==== Match-up results ====
	Round 1							Round 2						
Team ╲ Game	1	2	3	4	5	6	7	8	9	10	11	12	13	14
Adamson	FEU school colors	Ateneo school colors	NU school colors	UE school colors	La Salle school colors	UST school colors	UP school colors	UST school colors	FEU school colors	Ateneo school colors	UP school colors	UE school colors	La Salle school colors	NU school colors
Ateneo	La Salle school colors	Adamson school colors	UE school colors	UP school colors	NU school colors	FEU school colors	UST school colors	FEU school colors	UST school colors	Adamson school colors	UE school colors	UP school colors	NU school colors	La Salle school colors
La Salle	Ateneo school colors	FEU school colors	UST school colors	NU school colors	Adamson school colors	UP school colors	UE school colors	UE school colors	UP school colors	NU school colors	FEU school colors	UST school colors	Adamson school colors	Ateneo school colors
FEU	Adamson school colors	La Salle school colors	UP school colors	UST school colors	UE school colors	Ateneo school colors	NU school colors	Ateneo school colors	Adamson school colors	UST school colors	La Salle school colors	NU school colors	UP school colors	UE school colors
NU	UP school colors	UE school colors	Adamson school colors	La Salle school colors	Ateneo school colors	UST school colors	FEU school colors	UP school colors	UE school colors	La Salle school colors	UST school colors	FEU school colors	Ateneo school colors	Adamson school colors
UE	UST school colors	NU school colors	Ateneo school colors	Adamson school colors	UP school colors	FEU school colors	La Salle school colors	La Salle school colors	NU school colors	UP school colors	Ateneo school colors	Adamson school colors	UST school colors	FEU school colors
UP	NU school colors	UST school colors	FEU school colors	Ateneo school colors	UE school colors	La Salle school colors	Adamson school colors	NU school colors	La Salle school colors	UE school colors	Adamson school colors	Ateneo school colors	FEU school colors	UST school colors
UST	UE school colors	UP school colors	La Salle school colors	FEU school colors	Adamson school colors	NU school colors	Ateneo school colors	Adamson school colors	Ateneo school colors	FEU school colors	NU school colors	La Salle school colors	UE school colors	UP school colors

= Win; = OT win; = Loss; = OT loss

==== Results ====
Team	AdU	ADMU	DLSU	FEU	NU	UE	UP	UST
Adamson Soaring Falcons		45–72	61–76	71–74	73–65	66–64	68–76	80–88*
Ateneo Blue Eagles	78–59		79–73	66–72	74–62	64–58	83–66	64–57
De La Salle Green Archers	84–79*	57–65		73–62	93–69	62–68	82–60	85–84
FEU Tamaraws	70–62	74–78	83–75		61–69	71–69	88–66	70–65
NU Bulldogs	57–68	58–83	67–79	60–64		69–82	58–87	77–88
UE Red Warriors	58–45	57–61*	61–70	73–61	67–50		87–58	78–73
UP Fighting Maroons	73–42	58–79	61–81	70–71	59–72	65–95		75–94
UST Growling Tigers	97–83	76–85	79–81	69–74*	68–58	87–89	71–63	

Legend: Blue = left column team win; Red = top row team win.
Matches with lighter background shading were decided after overtime.

=== Second seed playoff ===
Studio 23

September 11

De La Salle Green Archers	62–59	FEU Tamaraws
La Salle wins the twice–to–beat advantage

Araneta Coliseum, Quezon City

=== Bracket ===
Semifinals (Top 2 twice-to-beat)
1	Ateneo	70
4	UE	50
2	La Salle	67
3	FEU	62

Finals (Best-of-three playoff)
1	Ateneo	69	62
2	La Salle	61	51

=== Semifinals ===
==== (1) Ateneo vs. (4) UE ====
The Ateneo Blue Eagles has the twice-to-beat advantage.

Studio 23

September 14

Ateneo Blue Eagles	70–50	UE Red Warriors
Ateneo wins series in one game

Araneta Coliseum, Quezon City

==== (2) La Salle vs. (3) FEU ====
The De La Salle Green Archers has the twice-to-beat advantage.

Studio 23

September 14

De La Salle Green Archers	67–62	FEU Tamaraws
La Salle wins series in one game

Araneta Coliseum, Quezon City

=== Finals ===
Studio 23

September 21

Ateneo Blue Eagles	69–61	De La Salle Green Archers

Araneta Coliseum, Quezon City

Studio 23

September 25

Ateneo Blue Eagles	62–51	De La Salle Green Archers
Ateneo wins series 2–0

Araneta Coliseum, Quezon City

- Finals Most Valuable Player: Nonoy Baclao (Ateneo Blue Eagles)

=== Awards ===
UAAP Season 71 men's basketball champions
Ateneo Blue Eagles
Fourth title
(18th title including NCAA championships)

- Most Valuable Player: Rabeh Al-Hussaini (Ateneo Blue Eagles)
- Rookie of the Year: Ryan Buenafe (Ateneo Blue Eagles)

== Women's tournament ==
=== Elimination round ===
Games, which began on July 6, are held at the Blue Eagle Gym.

==== Team standings ====
Pos	Team	W	L	PCT	GB	Qualification
1	FEU Lady Tamaraws	13	1	.929	—	Twice-to-beat in the semifinals
2	UST Growling Tigresses	10	4	.714 (Note: Second-seed playoff: UST 69–64)	3	Twice-to-beat in the semifinals
3	UP Lady Maroons (H)	10	4	.714	3	Twice-to-win in the semifinals
4	Adamson Lady Falcons	9	5	.643	4	Twice-to-win in the semifinals
5	De La Salle Lady Archers	7	7	.500	6	
6	Ateneo Lady Eagles	4	10	.286	9	
7	UE Lady Warriors	2	12	.143	11	
8	NU Lady Bulldogs	1	13	.071	12	

Source: ABS-CBN Sports
Rules for classification: 1) winning percentage; 2) if tied for #2 or #4, one-game playoff; 3) head-to-head record; 4) head-to-head point differential; 5) overall point differential
(H) Hosts

==== Match-up results ====
	Round 1							Round 2						
Team ╲ Game	1	2	3	4	5	6	7	8	9	10	11	12	13	14
AdU	UP school colors	NU school colors	Ateneo school colors	FEU school colors	La Salle school colors	UE school colors	UST school colors	UE school colors	FEU school colors	NU school colors	La Salle school colors	UST school colors	UP school colors	Ateneo school colors
AdMU	UST school colors	FEU school colors	Adamson school colors	La Salle school colors	UE school colors	NU school colors	UP school colors	NU school colors	UP school colors	UE school colors	FEU school colors	La Salle school colors	UST school colors	Adamson school colors
DLSU	NU school colors	UP school colors	UE school colors	Ateneo school colors	Adamson school colors	UST school colors	FEU school colors	UP school colors	NU school colors	FEU school colors	Adamson school colors	Ateneo school colors	UE school colors	UST school colors
FEU	UE school colors	Ateneo school colors	NU school colors	Adamson school colors	UST school colors	UP school colors	La Salle school colors	UST school colors	Adamson school colors	La Salle school colors	Ateneo school colors	UE school colors	NU school colors	UP school colors
NU	La Salle school colors	Adamson school colors	FEU school colors	UST school colors	UP school colors	Ateneo school colors	UE school colors	Ateneo school colors	La Salle school colors	Adamson school colors	UST school colors	UP school colors	FEU school colors	UE school colors
UE	FEU school colors	UST school colors	La Salle school colors	UP school colors	Ateneo school colors	Adamson school colors	NU school colors	Adamson school colors	UST school colors	Ateneo school colors	UP school colors	FEU school colors	La Salle school colors	NU school colors
UP	Adamson school colors	La Salle school colors	UST school colors	UE school colors	NU school colors	FEU school colors	Ateneo school colors	La Salle school colors	Ateneo school colors	UST school colors	UE school colors	NU school colors	Adamson school colors	FEU school colors
UST	Ateneo school colors	UE school colors	UP school colors	NU school colors	FEU school colors	La Salle school colors	Adamson school colors	FEU school colors	UE school colors	UP school colors	NU school colors	Adamson school colors	Ateneo school colors	La Salle school colors

= Win; = OT win; = Loss; = OT loss

==== Rivalry games ====
July 20

Ateneo Lady Eagles	45–70	Adamson Lady Falcons

Blue Eagle Gym, Quezon City

September 3

Ateneo Lady Eagles	52–64	Adamson Lady Falcons

Blue Eagle Gym, Quezon City

July 23

Adamson Lady Falcons	36–48	FEU Lady Tamaraws

Blue Eagle Gym, Quezon City

August 24

Adamson Lady Falcons	33–52	FEU Lady Tamaraws

Blue Eagle Gym, Quezon City

July 23

Ateneo Lady Eagles	47–58	De La Salle Lady Archers

Blue Eagle Gym, Quezon City

August 28

Ateneo Lady Eagles	49–61	De La Salle Lady Archers

Blue Eagle Gym, Quezon City

July 27

Adamson Lady Falcons	47–59	De La Salle Lady Archers

Blue Eagle Gym, Quezon City

August 24

Adamson Lady Falcons	67–33	De La Salle Lady Archers

Blue Eagle Gym, Quezon City

August 17

Ateneo Lady Eagles	55–68	UP Lady Maroons

Blue Eagle Gym, Quezon City

August 3

Ateneo Lady Eagles	43–57	UP Lady Maroons

Blue Eagle Gym, Quezon City

=== Second seed playoff ===
September 10

UP Lady Maroons	64–69	UST Growling Tigresses
UST wins the twice–to–beat advantage

The Arena in San Juan, San Juan

=== Bracket ===
Semifinals (Top 2 twice-to-beat)
1	FEU	56	74
4	Adamson	57	63
2	UST	39	46
3	UP	52	50

Finals (Best-of-three playoff)
1	FEU	54	52
3	UP	52	46

=== Semifinals ===
==== (1) FEU vs. (4) Adamson ====
September 13

FEU Lady Tamaraws	56–57	Adamson Lady Falcons

The Arena in San Juan, San Juan

September 17

FEU Lady Tamaraws	74–63	Adamson Lady Falcons
FEU wins series in two games

The Arena in San Juan, San Juan

==== (2) UP vs. (3) UST ====
September 13

UST Growling Tigresses	39–52	UP Lady Maroons

The Arena in San Juan, San Juan

September 17

UST Growling Tigresses	46–50	UP Lady Maroons
UP wins series in two games

The Arena in San Juan, San Juan

=== Finals ===
Studio 23

September 20

FEU Lady Tamaraws	54–52	UP Lady Maroons

The Arena in San Juan, San Juan

Studio 23

September 27

FEU Lady Tamaraws	52–46	UP Lady Maroons
FEU wins series 2–0

The Arena in San Juan, San Juan

- Finals Most Valuable Player: Bernadette Mercado (FEU Lady Tamaraws)

=== Awards ===
UAAP Season 71 women's basketball champions
FEU Lady Tamaraws
Ninth title

The season's awardees were:

- Most Valuable Player: Marichu Bacaro (UST Growling Tigresses)
- Rookie of the Year: Angelica Ortega (Adamson Lady Falcons)
- Mythical Five:
  - Katherine Sandel (Adamson Lady Falcons)
  - Marichu Bacaro (UST Growling Tigresses)
  - Cindy Resultay (UE Lady Warriors)
  - Sihaya Sadorra (UP Lady Maroons)
  - Ma. Ana Fatima Tolentino (UP Lady Maroons)

== Juniors' tournament ==
=== Elimination round ===
Games, which began on July 9, are held at the Blue Eagle Gym

==== Team standings ====
Pos	Team	W	L	PCT	GB	Qualification
1	Ateneo Blue Eaglets	12	2	.857 (Note: Head-to-head record: Ateneo 1–1 La Salle (Ateneo +2))	—	Twice-to-beat in the semifinals
2	Zobel Junior Archers	12	2	.857	—	Twice-to-beat in the semifinals
3	FEU–D Baby Tamaraws	9	5	.643 (Note: Head-to-head record: FEU 1–1 Adamson (FEU +10))	3	Twice-to-win in the semifinals
4	Adamson Baby Falcons	9	5	.643	3	Twice-to-win in the semifinals
5	UST Tiger Cubs	8	6	.571	4	
6	UE Junior Red Warriors	3	11	.214 (Note: Head-to-head record: UE 1–1 NU (UE +10))	9	
7	NUNS Bullpups	3	11	.214	9	
8	UPIS Junior Fighting Maroons (H)	0	14	.000	12	

Source: ABS-CBN Sports
Rules for classification: 1) winning percentage; 2) if tied for #2 or #4, one-game playoff; 3) head-to-head record; 4) head-to-head point differential; 5) overall point differential
(H) Hosts

==== Match-up results ====
	Round 1							Round 2						
Team ╲ Game	1	2	3	4	5	6	7	8	9	10	11	12	13	14
AdU	UST school colors	Ateneo school colors	UP school colors	La Salle school colors	NU school colors	FEU school colors	UE school colors	UE school colors	La Salle school colors	UP school colors	FEU school colors	UST school colors	Ateneo school colors	NU school colors
AdMU	NU school colors	Adamson school colors	FEU school colors	UP school colors	UST school colors	UE school colors	La Salle school colors	FEU school colors	NU school colors	UST school colors	UE school colors	UP school colors	Adamson school colors	La Salle school colors
DLSZ	FEU school colors	UE school colors	NU school colors	Adamson school colors	UP school colors	UST school colors	Ateneo school colors	UST school colors	Adamson school colors	FEU school colors	NU school colors	UE school colors	UP school colors	Ateneo school colors
FEU	La Salle school colors	UP school colors	Ateneo school colors	UST school colors	UE school colors	Adamson school colors	NU school colors	Ateneo school colors	UP school colors	La Salle school colors	Adamson school colors	NU school colors	UE school colors	UST school colors
NSNU	Ateneo school colors	UST school colors	La Salle school colors	UE school colors	Adamson school colors	UP school colors	FEU school colors	UP school colors	Ateneo school colors	UE school colors	La Salle school colors	FEU school colors	UST school colors	Adamson school colors
UE	UP school colors	La Salle school colors	UST school colors	NU school colors	FEU school colors	Ateneo school colors	Adamson school colors	Adamson school colors	UST school colors	NU school colors	Ateneo school colors	La Salle school colors	FEU school colors	UP school colors
UPIS	UE school colors	FEU school colors	Adamson school colors	Ateneo school colors	La Salle school colors	NU school colors	UST school colors	NU school colors	FEU school colors	Adamson school colors	UST school colors	Ateneo school colors	La Salle school colors	UE school colors
UST	Adamson school colors	NU school colors	UE school colors	FEU school colors	Ateneo school colors	La Salle school colors	UP school colors	La Salle school colors	UE school colors	Ateneo school colors	UP school colors	Adamson school colors	NU school colors	FEU school colors

= Win; = OT win; = Loss; = OT loss

==== Rivalry games ====
July 22

Ateneo Blue Eaglets	76–29	UPIS Junior Fighting Maroons

Blue Eagle Gym, Quezon City

August 26

Ateneo Blue Eaglets	115–28	UPIS Junior Fighting Maroons

Blue Eagle Gym, Quezon City

July 26

UST Tiger Cubs	74–75	Ateneo Blue Eaglets

Blue Eagle Gym, Quezon City

August 16

UST Tiger Cubs	72–93	Ateneo Blue Eaglets

Blue Eagle Gym, Quezon City

August 2

Ateneo Blue Eaglets	74–77	Zobel Junior Archers

Blue Eagle Gym, Quezon City

September 6

Ateneo Blue Eaglets	69–64	Zobel Junior Archers

Blue Eagle Gym, Quezon City

=== Bracket ===
Semifinals (Top 2 twice-to-beat)
1	Ateneo	78
4	Adamson	45
2	La Salle Zobel	70	56
3	FEU–FERN	72**	58

Finals (Best-of-three playoff)
1	Ateneo	72	71
3	FEU–FERN	62	60

**Double overtime

=== Semifinals ===
==== (1) Ateneo vs. (4) Adamson ====
September 13

Ateneo Blue Eaglets	78–45	Adamson Baby Falcons
Ateneo wins series in one game

The Arena in San Juan, San Juan

==== (2) DLSZ vs. (3) FEU-FERN ====
September 13

Zobel Junior Archers	70–72 (2OT)	FEU–FERN Baby Tamaraws

The Arena in San Juan, San Juan

September 17

Zobel Junior Archers	56–58	FEU–FERN Baby Tamaraws
FEU-FERN wins series in two games

The Arena in San Juan, San Juan

=== Finals ===
Studio 23

September 20

Ateneo Blue Eaglets	72–62	FEU–FERN Baby Tamaraws

The Arena in San Juan, San Juan

Studio 23

September 27

Ateneo Blue Eaglets	71–60	FEU–FERN Baby Tamaraws
Ateneo wins series 2–0

The Arena in San Juan, San Juan

- Finals Most Valuable Player: John David Dumrique (Ateneo Blue Eaglets)

=== Awards ===
UAAP Season 71 juniors' basketball champions
Ateneo Blue Eaglets
15th title

The season's awardees were:

- Most Valuable Player: Mark Kevin Juruena (Adamson Baby Falcons)
- Rookie of the Year: Luis Alfonso dela Paz (Zobel Junior Archers)
- Mythical team:
  - Juan Miguel Tiongson (Ateneo Blue Eaglets)
  - Mark Kevin Juruena (Adamson Baby Falcons)
  - Luis Alfonso dela Paz (Zobel Junior Archers)
  - Juan Nicolas Elorde (Zobel Junior Archers)
  - Gwyne Matthew Capacio (Zobel Junior Archers)

== Broadcast notes ==
Studio 23 broadcast all of the men's basketball games. UAAP Sports Center airs every Tuesday as a supplement to the coverage.

Playoff broadcasters are:

Game	Play-by-play	Analyst	Courtside reporters
Second-seed game			
La Salle-FEU semifinal	Eric Tipan	Luigi Trillo	Sharon Yu and Kristel Filart
Ateneo-UE semifinal	Boom Gonzalez	Mark Molina	Portia Silva and Alexis Go
Juniors' Finals Game 1			
Men's Finals Game 1	Boom Gonzalez	TJ Manotoc	Sharon Yu and Kamae de Jesus
Men's Finals Game 2	Boom Gonzalez	TJ Manotoc	Kamae de Jesus and Sharon Yu

== Champion rosters ==
=== Ateneo Blue Eagles ===
Years are years spent in the university, not number of years that he played for the team. Note: Flags indicate national team eligibility at FIBA sanctioned events. Players may hold other non-FIBA nationality not displayed.

No.		Position	Player
19	(Philippines)	C	Rabeh Al-Hussaini
8	(Philippines)	SF	Bacon Austria
7	(Philippines)	PF/C	Nonoy Baclao
16	(Philippines)	PF	Mike Baldos
13	(Philippines)	SF	Ryan Buenafe
15	(United States)	C	Vince Burke
18	(Philippines)	PF	Justin Chua
4	(Philippines)	PG	Yuri Escueta
20	(Philippines)	SF	Torino Gonzaga
12	(United States)	PG	Kirk Long
10	(Philippines)	C	Jobe Nkemakolam
5	(Philippines)	PG	Jai Reyes
11	(Philippines)	SG	Eric Salamat
14	(Philippines)	PF	Nico Salva
6	(Philippines)	SG	Oping Sumalinog
17	(Philippines)	SG	Chris Tiu
Position			Name/s
Head coach:			(United States) Norman Black
				Ateneo Blue Eagles

== See also ==
- NCAA Season 84 basketball tournaments

Preceded by Season 70 (2007)	UAAP basketball seasons Season 71 (2008)	Succeeded by Season 72 (2009)
