= Manilla Santos =

Filipino volleyball player (born 1984)

Personal information
- Full name: Manilla Santos-Ng
- Nickname: Illa
- Nationality: Filipino
- Born: December 28, 1984 (age 41)
- Height: 1.63 m (5 ft 4 in)
- Education: De La Salle University (2002–2009)

Volleyball information
- Position: Outside Hitter

Career
Years	Teams
2019	Choco Mucho Flying Titans

Manilla Santos-Ng (born December 28, 1984) is a former Filipino volleyball player last played for the Choco Mucho Flying Titans of the Premier Volleyball League.

== Career ==
=== Collegiate ===
Santos-Ng played for the Lady Archers of the De La Salle University in the University Athletic Association of the Philippines (UAAP). She also tried out for the Letran Knights of the Colegio de San Juan de Letran but decided to go to De La Salle.

She ended her stint with La Salle playing for them in Season 71, where they won the championship title in 2009. After her farewell game and winning their championship title, her jersey #14 was retired by De La Salle University. She is the first non-basketball player to retire the jersey.

=== Club ===
Granting her son's wish to see her play, Santos-Ng in 2019 came out of retirement to suit up for the Choco Mucho Flying Titans of the Premier Volleyball League. After playing for her only tournament with Choco Mucho, the 2019 Open Conference, Santos-Ng announced that she would not suit up for the 2021 season.

== Personal life ==
After her retirement from collegiate volleyball, Santos would get married and had children. Aside from being a housewife, she would work as part-time make up artist with some of her clients who knew her through her volleyball stint. She is married to a business executive from the Ng family who works for Republic Biscuit Corporation, with whom she has two children.

== Clubs ==
- Choco Mucho Flying Titans (2019)

== Awards ==
=== Individual (partial awards) ===
Year	UAAP Season	Award	Ref			
Year	UAAP Season	Award	Ref	2009	71	Most Valuable Player
Best Receiver				2009	71	

=== Collegiate ===
==== De La Salle Lady Archers ====
Year	UAAP Season	Title	Ref			
Year	UAAP Season	Title	Ref	2003	65	Runner-up
2004	66	Champions				
2005	67	Champions				
2006	68	Champions				
2009	71	Champions				
