= List of NCAA Philippines seasons =

This is a list of National Collegiate Athletic Association (Philippines) seasons.

== List ==
Season	Academic year	Host	Theme
0	1924–25	University of the Philippines	
1	1925–26	University of the Philippines	
2	1926–27	University of the Philippines	
3	1927–28	none	
4	1928–29	University of the Philippines	
5	1929–30	University of Santo Tomas	
6	1930–31	Ateneo de Manila	
7	1931–32	Ateneo de Manila	
8	1932–33	Colegio de San Juan de Letran	
9	1933–34	José Rizal College	
10	1934–35	José Rizal College	
11	1935–36	San Beda College	
12	1936–37	Mapúa Institute of Technology	
13	1937–38	none	
14	1938–39	Colegio de San Juan de Letran	
15	1939–40	Colegio de San Juan de Letran	
16	1940–41	José Rizal College	
17 (Note: Cancelled mid-season due to World War II)	1941–42	José Rizal College	
18 (Note: Not held due to World War II)	1942–43	—N/a	
19	1943–44	—N/a	
20	1944–45	—N/a	
21	1945–46	—N/a	
22	1946–47	—N/a	
23	1947–48	De La Salle College	
24	1948–49	De La Salle College	
25	1949–50	De La Salle College	
26	1950–51	Colegio de San Juan de Letran	
27	1951–52	Colegio de San Juan de Letran	
28	1952–53	Mapúa Institute of Technology	
29	1953–54	Ateneo de Manila	
30	1954–55	De La Salle College	
31	1955–56	José Rizal College	
32	1956–57	José Rizal College	
33	1957–58	Colegio de San Juan de Letran	
34	1958–59	San Beda College	
35	1959–60	Ateneo de Manila University	
36	1960–61	Colegio de San Juan de Letran	
37	1961–62	De La Salle College	
38	1962–63	none	
39	1963–64	De La Salle College	
40	1964–65	De La Salle College	
41	1965–66	Ateneo de Manila University	
42	1966–67	Colegio de San Juan de Letran	
43	1967–68	José Rizal College	
44	1968–69	Mapúa Institute of Technology	
45	1969–70	San Beda College	
46	1970–71	Ateneo de Manila University	
47	1971–72	De La Salle College	
48	1972–73	José Rizal College	
49	1973–74	Mapúa Institute of Technology	
50	1974–75	San Sebastian College – Recoletos	
51	1975–76	Ateneo de Manila University	
52	1976–77	Colegio de San Juan de Letran	
53	1977–78	De La Salle University	
54	1978–79	José Rizal College	
55	1979–80	Mapúa Institute of Technology	
56	1980–81	San Beda College	
57	1981–82	none	
58	1982–83	Trinity College of Quezon City	
59	1983–84	Colegio de San Juan de Letran	
60	1984–85	José Rizal College	
61	1985–86	Mapúa Institute of Technology	
62	1986–87	San Sebastian College – Recoletos	
63	1987–88	Colegio de San Juan de Letran	
64	1988–89	José Rizal College	Strong Bridges, Not Walls
65	1989–90	José Rizal College	
66	1990–91	Perpetual Help College of Rizal	
67	1991–92	San Beda College	
68	1992–93	San Sebastian College – Recoletos	
69	1993–94	José Rizal College	
70	1994–95	Mapúa Institute of Technology	Empowering the Youth through Sports
71	1995–96	Perpetual Help College of Rizal	
72	1996–97	San Beda College	Sports for national consciousness and global understanding
73	1997–98	San Sebastian College – Recoletos	
74	1998–99	Colegio de San Juan de Letran	
75	1999–2000	José Rizal University	Continuing Its Legacy of Friendship and Goodwill Through Sports
76	2000–01	Mapúa Institute of Technology	Living the Tradition Building for Tomorrow
77	2001–02	Philippine Christian University	The Heritage of Sports: A Search for Balance and Harmony
78	2002–03	San Beda College	Pursuing the Culture of Peace through Sports
79	2003–04	San Sebastian College – Recoletos	NCAA at 79: A Family Through Time
80	2004–05	University of Perpetual Help Rizal	Mighty @ 80!
81	2005–06	Colegio de San Juan de Letran	One @ 81: Values Formation Through Sports
82	2006–07	De La Salle–College of Saint Benilde	Proud and True at 82: Blazing Beyond Limits
83	2007–08	José Rizal University	Soaring High and Free at 83
84	2008–09	Mapúa Institute of Technology	To the Fore at 84: Building Bridges Through Sports
85	2009–10	San Beda College	Winning Drive at 85
86	2010–11	San Sebastian College – Recoletos	Youth Speaks @ 86!
87	2011–12	University of Perpetual Help System DALTA	Brazen @ 87
88	2012–13	Colegio de San Juan de Letran	Celebrate @ 88!: Conquering new glories for your honor
89	2013–14	De La Salle–College of Saint Benilde	Our stars will shine in 89
90	2014–15	José Rizal University	Today's Heroes, Tomorrow's Legends. NCAA@90: We Make History.
91	2015–16	Mapúa Institute of Technology	Engineered for Sports Excellence in the New Decade, Season 91
92	2016–17	San Beda College	Sports Builds Character: Achieving Breakthroughs at Season 92
93	2017–18	San Sebastian College – Recoletos	Reignite: Bolder. Braver. Stronger.
94	2018–19	University of Perpetual Help System DALTA	UnParalleled Heights through Sports Development
95 (Note: Cancelled mid-season due to the COVID-19 pandemic)	2019–20	Arellano University	Kaisa sa Pagkakaiba
96 (Note: Not held due to the COVID-19 pandemic)	2020–21	Colegio de San Juan de Letran	Rise Up Stronger
97 (Note: Limited number of events due to the COVID-19 pandemic)	2021–22	De La Salle–College of Saint Benilde	Stronger Together. Buo ang Puso
98	2022–23	Emilio Aguinaldo College	Achieve Greatness Every Day
99	2023–24	José Rizal University	New Heroes of the Game
100	2024–25	Lyceum of the Philippines University	Siglo Uno: Inspiring Legacies
101	2025–26	Mapúa University	Building Greatness
102	2026–27	San Beda University	Strive. Believe. Unite. One League. One Community. One Pride.

=== Times hosted per member ===
School	Total
José Rizal University	17
Colegio de San Juan de Letran	15
Mapúa University	11
San Beda University	10
De La Salle University (Note: No longer an NCAA member)	9
Ateneo de Manila University	7
San Sebastian College – Recoletos	7
University of Perpetual Help System DALTA	5
University of the Philippines	4
De La Salle–College of Saint Benilde	3
Arellano University	1
Emilio Aguinaldo College	1
Lyceum of the Philippines University	1
Philippine Christian University	1
Trinity College of Quezon City	1
University of Santo Tomas	1

== Gallery ==
Blazie, the mascot of the 82nd season.

== See also ==
- List of UAAP seasons
