= UAAP Season 70 basketball tournaments =

Basketball competition in the Philippines

UAAP Season 70
- Host school: University of Santo Tomas
Men's Finals	G1	G2	Wins
UE Red Warriors	63	64	0
De La Salle Green Archers	64	73	2
- Duration: October 4–11, 2007
- Arena(s): Araneta Coliseum
- Finals MVP: JV Casio and Pocholo Villanueva (co-winners)
- Winning coach: Franz Pumaren (5th title)
- Semifinalists: Ateneo Blue Eagles; UST Growling Tigers
- TV network(s): Studio 23 and TFC
Women's Finals	G1	G2	Wins
Ateneo Lady Eagles	64	62	2
UP Lady Maroons	60	58	0
- Duration: September 22–29
- Arena(s): Ninoy Aquino Stadium
- Finals MVP: Kat Quimpo
- Winning coach: John Flores (2nd title)
- Semifinalists: Adamson Lady Falcons; UST Growling Tigresses
- TV network(s): Studio 23 and TFC
Juniors' Finals	G1	G2 (OT)	Wins
Ateneo Blue Eaglets	74	92	0
Zobel Junior Archers	76	98	2
- Duration: September 22–29
- Arena(s): Ninoy Aquino Stadium
- Finals MVP: Joshua Webb
- Winning coach: Boris Aldeguer (1st title)
- Semifinalists: FEU–D Baby Tamaraws; NUNS Bullpups
- TV network(s): Studio 23 and TFC

The basketball tournaments of University Athletic Association of the Philippines (UAAP) Season 70 started on July 7, 2007, at the Araneta Coliseum with University of Santo Tomas (UST) Rector Very Rev. Fr. Ernesto Arceo, O.P. delivering the speech. Manuel V. Pangilinan of the Samahang Basketbol ng Pilipinas and United States ambassador to the Philippines Kristie Kenney were the guests.

Former UST Growling Tigers basketball player Ed Cordero is the season's commissioner. The theme is "Winners All, Recreating the Value of Honesty through Sports" The Studio 23 coverage uses the theme "Madrama" (Tagalog for "full of drama").

Despite a 14–0 sweep by the University of the East (UE) Red Warriors in the elimination round, they were in turn swept by the De La Salle University-Manila Green Archers 2–0 in the finals after UE had a half-a-month's rest. De La Salle Santiago Zobel School (DLSZ) Junior Archers clinched their second championship by beating the Ateneo High School Blue Eaglets with their own 2–0 sweep. Ateneo took home the women's championship with their own version of a sweep against the University of the Philippines Lady Maroons.

== Men's tournament ==
=== Teams ===
Team	University	Coach
Adamson Soaring Falcons	Adamson University (AdU)	(Philippines) Bogs Adornado
Ateneo Blue Eagles	Ateneo de Manila University (ADMU)	(United States) Norman Black
De La Salle Green Archers	De La Salle University (DLSU)	(Philippines) Franz Pumaren
FEU Tamaraws	Far Eastern University (FEU)	(Philippines) Glenn Capacio
NU Bulldogs	National University (NU)	(Philippines) Manny Dandan
UE Red Warriors	University of the East (UE)	(Philippines) Dindo Pumaren
UP Fighting Maroons	University of the Philippines Diliman (UP)	(Philippines) Joe Lipa
UST Growling Tigers	University of Santo Tomas (UST)	(Philippines) Pido Jarencio

=== Elimination round ===
==== Team standings ====
Pos	Team	W	L	PCT	GB	Qualification
1	UE Red Warriors	14	0	1.000	—	Advance to the Finals (Note: As UE won all of their elimination round games, the stepladder format will be used instead of the regular Final Four format.)
2	De La Salle Green Archers	9	5	.643 (Note: Second-seed playoff: La Salle 70–69 Ateneo)	5	Twice-to-beat in stepladder round 2
3	Ateneo Blue Eagles	9	5	.643	5	Proceed to stepladder round 1
4	UST Growling Tigers (H)	8	6	.571 (Note: Fourth-seed playoff: UST 80–69 FEU)	6	Proceed to stepladder round 1
5	FEU Tamaraws	8	6	.571	6	
6	NU Bulldogs	6	8	.429	8	
7	Adamson Soaring Falcons	2	12	.143	12	
8	UP Fighting Maroons	0	14	.000	14	

Source: ABS-CBN Sports
Rules for classification: 1) winning percentage; 2) if tied for #2 or #4, one-game playoff; 3) head-to-head record; 4) head-to-head point differential; 5) overall point differential
(H) Hosts

==== Match-up results ====
	Round 1							Round 2						
Team ╲ Game	1	2	3	4	5	6	7	8	9	10	11	12	13	14
Adamson	Ateneo school colors	La Salle school colors	UST school colors	FEU school colors	NU school colors	UP school colors	UE school colors	FEU school colors	La Salle school colors	UE school colors	Ateneo school colors	NU school colors	UST school colors	UP school colors
Ateneo	Adamson school colors	UP school colors	UE school colors	NU school colors	La Salle school colors	FEU school colors	UST school colors	UE school colors	FEU school colors	UST school colors	Adamson school colors	UP school colors	La Salle school colors	NU school colors
La Salle	UP school colors	Adamson school colors	FEU school colors	UE school colors	Ateneo school colors	UST school colors	NU school colors	UST school colors	FEU school colors	Adamson school colors	UP school colors	NU school colors	Ateneo school colors	UE school colors
FEU	NU school colors	UST school colors	La Salle school colors	Adamson school colors	Ateneo school colors	UE school colors	UP school colors	Adamson school colors	La Salle school colors	Ateneo school colors	UP school colors	UE school colors	NU school colors	UST school colors
NU	FEU school colors	UE school colors	UP school colors	Ateneo school colors	UST school colors	Adamson school colors	La Salle school colors	UP school colors	UE school colors	UST school colors	La Salle school colors	Adamson school colors	FEU school colors	Ateneo school colors
UE	UST school colors	NU school colors	Ateneo school colors	La Salle school colors	UP school colors	FEU school colors	Adamson school colors	Ateneo school colors	UST school colors	NU school colors	Adamson school colors	FEU school colors	UP school colors	La Salle school colors
UP	La Salle school colors	Ateneo school colors	NU school colors	UST school colors	UE school colors	Adamson school colors	FEU school colors	NU school colors	La Salle school colors	FEU school colors	UST school colors	Ateneo school colors	UE school colors	Adamson school colors
UST	UE school colors	FEU school colors	Adamson school colors	UP school colors	NU school colors	La Salle school colors	Ateneo school colors	La Salle school colors	UE school colors	NU school colors	Ateneo school colors	UP school colors	Adamson school colors	FEU school colors

= Win; = OT win; = Loss; = OT loss

==== Rivalry games ====
Studio 23

July 12

UP Fighting Maroons	55–79	Ateneo Blue Eagles

Ninoy Aquino Stadium, Manila

Studio 23

September 6

UP Fighting Maroons	59–93	Ateneo Blue Eagles

Ninoy Aquino Stadium, Manila

Studio 23

July 19

La Salle Green Archers	64–61	FEU Tamaraws

Ninoy Aquino Stadium, Manila

Studio 23

August 19

La Salle Green Archers	74–66	FEU Tamaraws

Cuneta Astrodome, Pasay

Studio 23

July 26

La Salle Green Archers	77–80 (OT)	Ateneo Blue Eagles

Araneta Coliseum, Quezon City

Studio 23

September 9

La Salle Green Archers	87–89	Ateneo Blue Eagles

Araneta Coliseum, Quezon City

Studio 23

July 29

La Salle Green Archers	90–86 (OT)	UST Growling Tigers

Araneta Coliseum, Quezon City

Studio 23

August 11

La Salle Green Archers	73–81 (OT)	UST Growling Tigers

Araneta Coliseum, Quezon City

Studio 23

August 2

UE Red Warriors	89–60	FEU Tamaraws

Ninoy Aquino Stadium, Manila

Studio 23

September 1

UE Red Warriors	79–72	FEU Tamaraws

Cuneta Astrodome, Pasay

=== Fourth seed playoff ===
Studio 23

September 17
3:00 p.m.

FEU Tamaraws	69–80	UST Growling Tigers
Scoring by quarter: 19–17, 6–22, 18–24, 26–17
UST advances to the Final Four

Araneta Coliseum, Quezon City

=== Second seed playoff ===
Studio 23

September 18
3:00 p.m.

Ateneo Blue Eagles	69–70	De La Salle Green Archers
Scoring by quarter: 13–12, 19–16, 15–22, 22–20
La Salle wins the twice-to-beat advantage

Araneta Coliseum, Quezon City

=== Bracket ===
Stepladder round 1 (Single-elimination)
3	Ateneo	69
4	UST	64

Stepladder round 2 (No. 2 twice-to-beat)
2	La Salle	64	65
3	Ateneo	65	60

Finals (Best-of-three playoff)
1	UE	63	64
2	La Salle	64	73

=== Stepladder semifinals ===
==== (3) Ateneo vs. (4) UST ====
This is a single-elimination game.

Studio 23

September 23
3:00 p.m.

Ateneo Blue Eagles	69–64	UST Growling Tigers
Scoring by quarter: 10–18, 22–12, 23–21, 14–13
Pts: Ford Arao 17; Rebs: Nonoy Baclao 8 Asts: Yuri Escueta 4		Pts: Jervy Cruz 17; Rebs: Jervy Cruz 16; Asts: Japs Cuan 5
Ateneo advances to the stepladder semifinals round 2

Araneta Coliseum, Quezon City

==== (2) La Salle vs. (3) Ateneo ====
La Salle has the twice-to-beat advantage, where they only have to win once, while their opponents twice, to progress.

Studio 23

September 27
3:00 p.m.

De La Salle Green Archers	64–65	Ateneo Blue Eagles
Scoring by quarter: 15–15, 16–15, 21–17, 12–18
Pts: Tyrone Tang 20; Rebs: Rico Maierhofer 7 Asts: JVee Casio 4		Pts: Ford Arao 19; Rebs: Nonoy Baclao 9 Asts: Chris Tiu 4

Araneta Coliseum, Quezon City
Attendance: 16,000

Studio 23

September 30
3:00 p.m.

De La Salle Green Archers	65–60	Ateneo Blue Eagles
Scoring by quarter: 16–14, 13–12, 19–17, 17-17
Pts: Cholo Villanueva 13; Rebs: Rico Maierhofer 10; Asts: JVee Casio 6		Pts: Ford Arao 14; Rebs: Rabah Al-Hussaini 8 Asts: Chris Tiu 4
La Salle wins series in two games

Araneta Coliseum, Quezon City
Attendance: 23,315

=== Finals ===
This is a best-of-three playoff.

Studio 23

October 4
3:00 p.m.

UE Red Warriors	63–64	De La Salle Green Archers
Scoring by quarter: 21–14, 18–23, 11–10, 13–17
Pts: Mark Borboran 13; Rebs: Hans Thiele 16; Asts: Arellano, Cañizares 3 Team TOs: 30		Pts: Ty Tang 17; Rebs: Rico Maierhofer 9 Asts: Villanueva, Maierhofer 3 Bench/starter pts: 26/38

Araneta Coliseum, Quezon City
Attendance: 16,000

Studio 23

October 7
3:00 p.m.

UE Red Warriors	64–73	De La Salle Green Archers
Scoring by quarter: 11–15, 12–19, 22–19, 19–21
Pts: Borboran, Lee 12 each Rebs: Borboran, Gregorio 10; Asts: 3 players 3 each Team TOs: 21		Pts: JVee Casio 17; Rebs: Rico Maierhofer 11; Asts: Cholo Villanueva 6 FTs: 27/36 (75%)
La Salle wins series 2–0

Araneta Coliseum, Quezon City
Attendance: 18,067

- Finals Most Valuable Player: JV Casio and Pocholo Villanueva (De La Salle Green Archers)

=== Awards ===
UAAP Season 70 men's basketball champions
De La Salle Green Archers
Seventh title

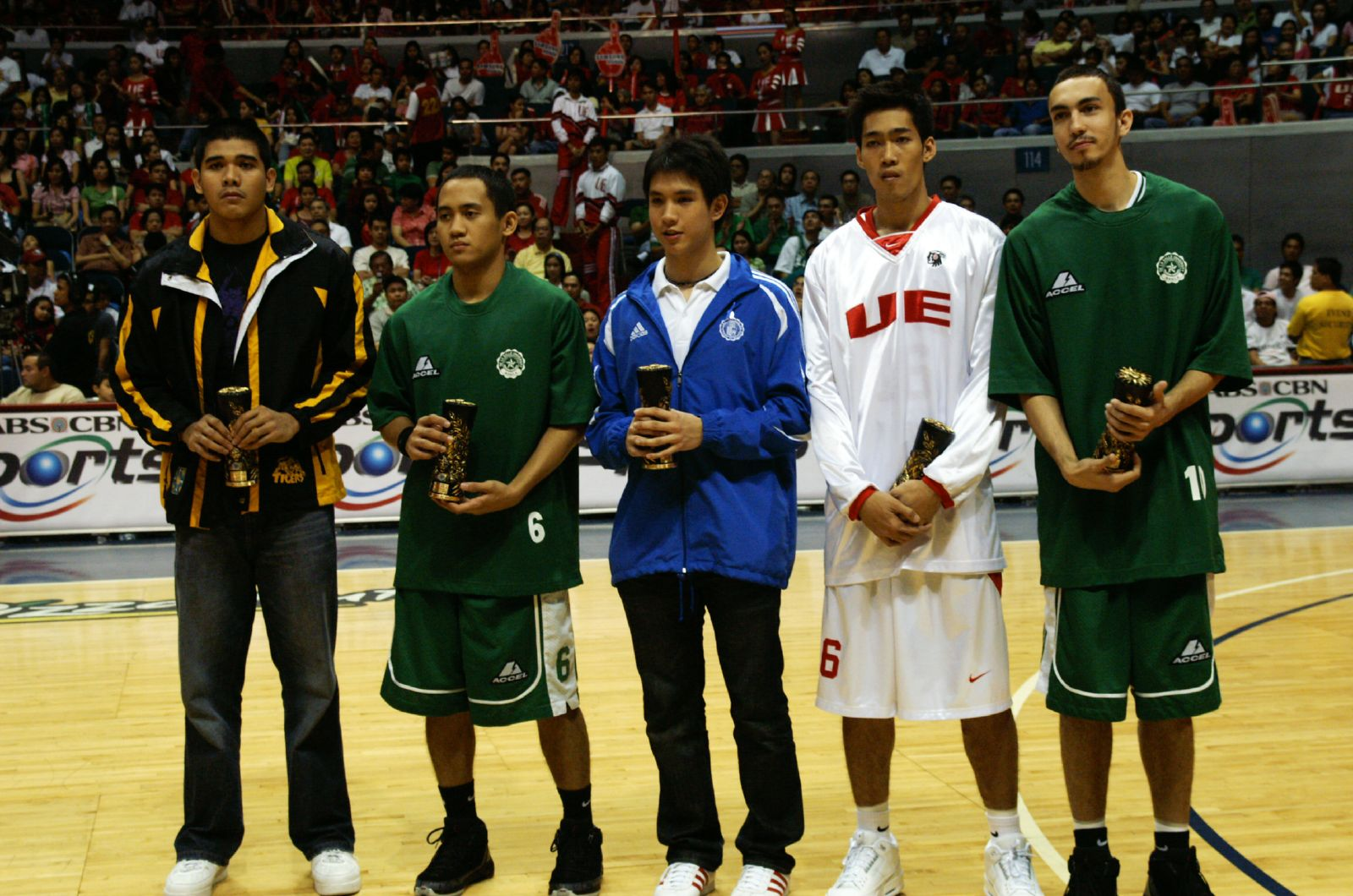
Mythical team for men's basketball: Jervy Cruz, JV Casio, Chris Tiu (represented by his brother Charles), Mark Borboran & Rico Maierhofer.

- Most Valuable Player: Jervy Cruz (UST Growling Tigers)
- Rookie of the Year: JR Cawaling (FEU Tamaraws)
- Defensive Player of the Year: Edwin Asoro (NU Bulldogs)
- Mythical Five:
  - Chris Tiu (Ateneo Blue Eagles)
  - JV Casio (De La Salle Green Archers)
  - Mark Borboran (UE Red Warriors)
  - Rico Maierhofer (De La Salle Green Archers)
  - Jervy Cruz (UST Growling Tigers)

== Women's tournament ==
=== Elimination round ===
Pos	Team	W	L	PCT	GB	Qualification
1	Ateneo Lady Eagles	12	2	.857	—	Twice-to-beat in the semifinals
2	UP Lady Maroons	11	3	.786	1	Twice-to-beat in the semifinals
3	UST Growling Tigresses (H)	10	4	.714	2	Twice-to-win in the semifinals
4	Adamson Lady Falcons	8	6	.571	4	Twice-to-win in the semifinals
5	FEU Lady Tamaraws	7	7	.500	5	
6	De La Salle Lady Archers	5	9	.357	7	
7	UE Lady Warriors	2	12	.143	10	
8	NU Lady Bulldogs	1	13	.071	11	

Rules for classification: 1) winning percentage; 2) if tied for #2 or #4, one-game playoff; 3) head-to-head record; 4) head-to-head point differential; 5) overall point differential
(H) Hosts

=== Schedule ===
	Round 1							Round 2						
Team ╲ Game	1	2	3	4	5	6	7	8	9	10	11	12	13	14
Adamson	NU school colors	UST school colors	La Salle school colors	UP school colors	Ateneo school colors	FEU school colors	UE school colors	NU school colors	Ateneo school colors	FEU school colors	La Salle school colors	UE school colors	UST school colors	UP school colors
Ateneo	UST school colors	NU school colors	FEU school colors	La Salle school colors	Adamson school colors	UE school colors	UP school colors	FEU school colors	Adamson school colors	La Salle school colors	UE school colors	NU school colors	UP school colors	UST school colors
La Salle	UE school colors	UP school colors	Adamson school colors	Ateneo school colors	FEU school colors	UST school colors	NU school colors	UP school colors	UE school colors	Ateneo school colors	Adamson school colors	UST school colors	FEU school colors	NU school colors
FEU	UP school colors	UE school colors	Ateneo school colors	NU school colors	La Salle school colors	Adamson school colors	UST school colors	Ateneo school colors	NU school colors	Adamson school colors	UST school colors	UP school colors	La Salle school colors	UE school colors
NU	Adamson school colors	Ateneo school colors	UE school colors	FEU school colors	UST school colors	UP school colors	La Salle school colors	Adamson school colors	FEU school colors	UST school colors	UP school colors	Ateneo school colors	UE school colors	La Salle school colors
UE	La Salle school colors	FEU school colors	NU school colors	UST school colors	UP school colors	Ateneo school colors	Adamson school colors	UST school colors	La Salle school colors	UP school colors	Ateneo school colors	Adamson school colors	NU school colors	FEU school colors
UP	FEU school colors	La Salle school colors	UST school colors	Adamson school colors	UE school colors	NU school colors	Ateneo school colors	La Salle school colors	UST school colors	UE school colors	NU school colors	FEU school colors	Ateneo school colors	Adamson school colors
UST	Ateneo school colors	Adamson school colors	UP school colors	UE school colors	NU school colors	La Salle school colors	FEU school colors	UE school colors	UP school colors	NU school colors	FEU school colors	La Salle school colors	Adamson school colors	Ateneo school colors

= Win; = OT win; = Loss; = OT loss

=== Rivalry games ===
July 21

Adamson Lady Falcons	61–46	De La Salle Lady Archers

Adamson University, Manila

August 29

Adamson Lady Falcons	67–57	De La Salle Lady Archers

Far Eastern University, Manila

July 26

De La Salle Lady Archers	51–63	Ateneo Lady Eagles

Far Eastern University, Manila

August 25

De La Salle Lady Archers	53–65	Ateneo Lady Eagles

Ateneo de Manila University, Quezon City

August 1

Ateneo Lady Eagles	74–68	Adamson Lady Falcons

Ateneo de Manila University, Quezon City

August 21

Ateneo Lady Eagles	64–56	Adamson Lady Falcons

Far Eastern University, Manila

August 4

Adamson Lady Falcons	44–51	FEU Lady Tamaraws

Adamson University, Manila

August 25

Adamson Lady Falcons	36–46	FEU Lady Tamaraws

Ateneo de Manila University, Quezon City

August 12

UP Lady Maroons	38–52	Ateneo Lady Eagles

Ateneo de Manila University, Quezon City

September 4

UP Lady Maroons	48–60	Ateneo Lady Eagles

Far Eastern University, Manila

=== Bracket ===
Semifinals (Top 2 twice-to-beat)
1	Ateneo	57
4	Adamson	46
2	UP	56
3	UST	54

Finals (Best-of-three playoff)
1	Ateneo	64	62
2	UP	60	58

=== Semifinals ===
==== (1) Ateneo vs. (4) Adamson ====
September 15

Ateneo Lady Eagles	57–46	Adamson Lady Falcons
Ateneo wins series in one game

Far Eastern University, Manila

==== (2) UP vs. (3) UST ====
September 15

UP Lady Maroons	56–54	UST Growling Tigresses
UP wins series in one game

Far Eastern University, Manila

=== Finals ===
No TV

Sept 22

Ateneo Lady Eagles	64–60	UP Lady Maroons

Ninoy Aquino Stadium, Manila

Studio 23

Sept 29

Ateneo Lady Eagles	62–58	UP Lady Maroons
Ateneo wins series 2–0

Ninoy Aquino Stadium, Manila

- Finals Most Valuable Player: Katrina Quimpo (Ateneo Lady Eagles)

=== Awards ===
UAAP Season 70 women's basketball champions
Ateneo Lady Eagles
Second title

- Most Valuable Player: Cassandra Tioseco (Ateneo Lady Eagles)
- Rookie of the Year: Cindy Resultay (UE Lady Warriors)

== Juniors' tournament ==
=== Elimination round ===
Pos	Team	W	L	PCT	GB	Qualification
1	Ateneo Blue Eaglets	13	1	.929	—	Twice-to-beat in the semifinals
2	Zobel Junior Archers	11	3	.786	2	Twice-to-beat in the semifinals
3	FEU–D Baby Tamaraws	9	5	.643	4	Twice-to-win in the semifinals
4	NUNS Bullpups	6	8	.429 (Note: Head-to-head record: NU 1–1 UE; fourth-seed playoff: NU 83–80)	7	Twice-to-win in the semifinals
5	UE Pages	6	8	.429	7	
6	Adamson Baby Falcons	5	9	.357	8	
7	UPIS Junior Fighting Maroons	4	10	.286	9	
8	UST Tiger Cubs (H)	2	12	.143	11	

Source: ABS-CBN Sports
Rules for classification: 1) winning percentage; 2) if tied for #2 or #4, one-game playoff; 3) head-to-head record; 4) head-to-head point differential; 5) overall point differential
(H) Hosts

=== Schedule ===
	Round 1							Round 2						
Team ╲ Game	1	2	3	4	5	6	7	8	9	10	11	12	13	14
AdU	Ateneo school colors	NU school colors	FEU school colors	La Salle school colors	UST school colors	UE school colors	UP school colors	UP school colors	Ateneo school colors	NU school colors	FEU school colors	La Salle school colors	UE school colors	UST school colors
AdMU	Adamson school colors	UST school colors	UP school colors	UE school colors	NU school colors	La Salle school colors	FEU school colors	FEU school colors	Adamson school colors	UE school colors	UP school colors	UST school colors	La Salle school colors	NU school colors
DLSZ	UE school colors	UP school colors	UST school colors	Adamson school colors	FEU school colors	Ateneo school colors	NU school colors	NU school colors	UE school colors	UP school colors	UST school colors	Adamson school colors	Ateneo school colors	FEU school colors
FEU	UP school colors	UE school colors	Adamson school colors	NU school colors	La Salle school colors	UST school colors	Ateneo school colors	Ateneo school colors	UP school colors	UST school colors	Adamson school colors	UE school colors	NU school colors	La Salle school colors
NU	UST school colors	Adamson school colors	UE school colors	FEU school colors	Ateneo school colors	UP school colors	La Salle school colors	La Salle school colors	UST school colors	Adamson school colors	UE school colors	UP school colors	FEU school colors	Ateneo school colors
UE	La Salle school colors	FEU school colors	NU school colors	Ateneo school colors	UP school colors	Adamson school colors	UST school colors	UST school colors	La Salle school colors	Ateneo school colors	NU school colors	FEU school colors	Adamson school colors	UP school colors
UPIS	FEU school colors	La Salle school colors	Ateneo school colors	UST school colors	UE school colors	NU school colors	Adamson school colors	Adamson school colors	FEU school colors	La Salle school colors	Ateneo school colors	NU school colors	UST school colors	UE school colors
UST	NU school colors	Ateneo school colors	La Salle school colors	UP school colors	Adamson school colors	FEU school colors	UE school colors	UE school colors	NU school colors	FEU school colors	La Salle school colors	Ateneo school colors	UP school colors	Adamson school colors

= Win; = OT win; = Loss; = OT loss

=== Rivalry games ===
July 8

Ateneo Blue Eaglets	74–68	Adamson Baby Falcons

Ateneo de Manila University, Quezon City

August 14

Ateneo Blue Eaglets	65–40	Adamson Baby Falcons

Far Eastern University, Manila

July 14

Ateneo Blue Eaglets	79–64	UST Tiger Cubs

Far Eastern University, Manila

August 28

Ateneo Blue Eaglets	82–66	UST Tiger Cubs

Far Eastern University, Manila

July 18

UPIS Junior Fighting Maroons	62–77	Ateneo Blue Eaglets

Adamson University, Manila

August 26

UPIS Junior Fighting Maroons	59–54	Ateneo Blue Eaglets

Ateneo de Manila University, Quezon City

July 22

UST Tiger Cubs	58–60	UPIS Junior Fighting Maroons

Ateneo de Manila University, Quezon City

September 1

UST Tiger Cubs	73–65	UPIS Junior Fighting Maroons

University of Santo Tomas, Manila

August 2

Ateneo Blue Eaglets	78–72	Zobel Junior Archers

Far Eastern University, Manila

September 1

Ateneo Blue Eaglets	71–63	Zobel Junior Archers

University of Santo Tomas, Manila

=== Fourth seed playoff ===
September 14

NUNS Bullpups	83–80	UE Pages

University of Santo Tomas, Manila

=== Bracket ===
Semifinals (Top 2 twice-to-beat)
1	Ateneo	70	94
4	NU	73	75
2	DLSZ	67
3	FEU–FERN	61

Finals (Best-of-three playoff)
1	Ateneo	74	92
2	DLSZ	76	98*

*Overtime

=== Semifinals ===
==== (1) Ateneo vs. (4) NU ====
September 16

Ateneo Blue Eaglets	70–73	NUNS Bullpups

University of Santo Tomas, Manila

September 18

Ateneo Blue Eaglets	94–75	NUNS Bullpups
Ateneo wins series in two games

University of Santo Tomas, Manila

==== (2) DLSZ vs. (3) FEU–FERN ====
September 16

Zobel Junior Archers	67–61	FEU–FERN Baby Tamaraws
La Salle wins series in one game

University of Santo Tomas, Manila

=== Finals ===
No TV

Sept 22

Ateneo Blue Eaglets	74–76	Zobel Junior Archers

Ninoy Aquino Stadium, Manila

Studio 23

Sept 29

Ateneo Blue Eaglets	92–98 (OT)	Zobel Junior Archers
La Salle wins series 2–0

Ninoy Aquino Stadium, Manila

- Finals Most Valuable Player: Joshua David Webb (Zobel Junior Archers)

=== Awards ===
- Most Valuable Player: Samuel Joseph Marata (UPIS Junior Fighting Maroons)
- Rookie of the Year: David Kurt De Guzman (FEU–D Baby Tamaraws)
- Mythical Five:
  - John David Dumrique (Ateneo Blue Eaglets)
  - Juan Miguel Tiongson (Ateneo Blue Eaglets)
  - Kevin Michael Batac (NUNS Bullpups)
  - Joshua David Webb (Zobel Junior Archers)
  - Mark Jovet Mendoza (NUNS Bullpups)

== Broadcast notes ==
ABS-CBN's UHF channel Studio 23 is the sole coverer of the games, covering all men's games. 101.9 For Life!, ABS-CBN's FM radio station, delivers updates on game dates. FM radio station NU 107 delivers on-the-court updates for Ateneo games.

UAAP Sportscenter airs every Tuesday afternoons as a supplement for the main UAAP coverage. Boom Gonzalez hosts the program.

Playoffs broadcasters:

Game	Play-by-play	Analyst	Courtside reporters
Men's fourth-seed game	Sev Sarmenta	Ronnie Magsanoc	Andi Manzano & Dianne Querrer
Men's second-seed game	Boom Gonzalez	TJ Manotoc	Sharon Yu & Vanna Lim
Men's first round game			Vanna Lim & Dianne Querrer
Men's Semifinal game 1	Boom Gonzalez	Ronnie Magsanoc	Vanna Lim & Sharon Yu
Women's Finals game 2	Eric Tipan	Ronnie Magsanoc	none
Juniors' Finals game 2	Boom Gonzalez	Mark Molina	none
Men's Semifinal game 2	Sev Sarmenta	Randy Sacdalan	Vanna Lim & Sharon Yu
Men's Finals game 1	Boom Gonzalez	Mark Molina	Tracy Abad & Sharon Yu
Men's Finals game 2	Boom Gonzalez	TJ Manotoc	Tracy Abad & Sharon Yu

== Champion rosters ==
=== De La Salle Green Archers ===
Note: Flags indicate national team eligibility at FIBA sanctioned events. Players may hold other non-FIBA nationality not displayed.

No.		Position	Player
5	(Philippines)	C	PJ Walsham
6	(Philippines)	PG	JV Casio
7	(Philippines)	PG	Simon Atkins
8	(Philippines)	SF	Bader Malabes
9	(Philippines)	SG	Pocholo Villanueva
10	(Philippines)	PF	Rico Maierhofer
11	(Philippines)	PG	Ty Tang (C)
12	(Philippines)	PF	Kish Co
15	(Philippines)	C	Brian Ilad
16	(Philippines)	SF	OJ Cua
17	(Philippines)	SF	Peejay Barua
18	(Indonesia)	PF	Ferdinand Damanik
19	(Philippines)	SF	James Mangahas
20	(Serbia)	C	Marko Batricevic
21	(Philippines)	SG	Rejan Lee
Position			Name/s
Head coach:			(Philippines) Franz Pumaren
				De La Salle Green Archers

== See also ==
- NCAA Season 83 basketball tournaments

Preceded by Season 69 (2006)	UAAP basketball seasons Season 70 (2007)	Succeeded by Season 71 (2008)
