= UAAP Season 72 basketball tournaments =

Basketball competition in the Philippines

UAAP Season 72
- Madrama
- Host school: Far Eastern University
| Men's Finals | G1 | G2 | G3 | Wins |
|---|---|---|---|---|
| Ateneo Blue Eagles | 78 | 68 | 71 | 2 |
| UE Red Warriors | 71 | 88 | 58 | 1 |
- Duration: October 1–8, 2009
- Arena(s): Araneta Coliseum
- Finals MVP: Rabeh Al-Hussaini
- Winning coach: Norman Black (2nd title)
- Semifinalists: FEU Tamaraws; UST Growling Tigers
- TV network(s): Studio 23, The Filipino Channel, Balls HD
| Women's Finals | G1 | G2 | Wins |
|---|---|---|---|
| FEU Lady Tamaraws | 51 | 50 | 0 |
| Adamson Lady Falcons | 58 | 64 | 2 |
- Duration: October 3–6, 2009
- Arena(s): Filoil Flying V Arena
- Finals MVP: Amby Almazan
- Winning coach: Emily Vega
- Semifinalists: De La Salle Lady Archers; UST Growling Tigresses
- TV network(s): Studio 23, The Filipino Channel, Balls HD
| Juniors' Finals | G1 | G2 | G3 | Wins |
|---|---|---|---|---|
| Zobel Junior Archers | 73 | 57 | 56 | 1 |
| Ateneo Blue Eaglets | 80 | 53 | 61 | 2 |
- Duration: October 3–8, 2009
- Arena(s): Filoil Flying V Arena (Games 1 & 2); Araneta Coliseum (Game 3)
- Finals MVP: Kiefer Ravena
- Winning coach: Jamike Jarin (7th title)
- Semifinalists: UST Tiger Cubs; FEU–D Baby Tamaraws
- TV network(s): Studio 23, The Filipino Channel, Balls HD

The University Athletic Association of the Philippines Season 72 basketball tournaments are the basketball events of UAAP's 2009–10 season.

Far Eastern University was the season host and the tournament kicked off with a doubleheader on July 11 at the Araneta Coliseum. At the conclusion of the season, the Ateneo Blue Eagles and the Ateneo Blue Eaglets successfully defended their men's and juniors' championships, beating the UE Red Warriors and the De La Salle Junior Archers in the Finals; the Adamson Lady Falcons reclaimed the women's championship beating the defending champions FEU Lady Tamaraws in their own Finals series.

ABS-CBN UHF channel Studio 23 broadcast the men's tournament for the tenth consecutive year, and renewed their contract with the UAAP for another five years.

== Preseason ==
NCAA Season 84 commissioner Joe Lipa will take over from last season's commissioner Chito Narvasa this season after he was appointed by the UAAP Board.

Major rule changes are:

- Instituting a more thorough system in breaking ties after the elimination round to determine seedings,
- Teams may now challenge the validity of a three-point field goal at any point of the game via instant replay,
- During the final two minutes of the game and in overtime, jump ball situations will be settled by a jump ball in the necessary area (free-throw lane or center circle). The possession arrow will be turned off and is not in use.

Major rules that are retained are:

- The adhesive pro-grip is still banned.
- Teams are still limited to two foreign nationals in their rosters, with only one allowed to play at a time.

League president Anton Montinola of Far Eastern University said that the method in breaking ties will use "common sense" as the tournament is prolonged by holding unnecessary matches.

Commissioner Joe Lipa also instructed referees, which come from Philippine Basketball Association, Philippine Basketball League and BRAASCU, to limit unnecessary technical fouls. Furthermore, a "no ID, no sitting on the bench rule" will be implemented to avoid what happened last season when La Salle coach Franz Pumaren was slapped a technical foul for not wearing his ID. Lipa said that the referees "must have the integrity" and their diverse backgrounds should not be a drawback for Lipa had been an advocate of having diverse groups of referees participating in a single tournament "instead of having the attitude of being parochial."

Due to the high demand of tickets for Ateneo-La Salle games, host FEU has devised a way for allocating tickets for fans of the two schools, although the Ateneo-La Salle game will still be a part of a doubleheader, tickets will be sold separately for the Ateneo-La Salle and the following FEU-UE game. The patrons who only have tickets for one game has to watch only the game stated on their tickets and has to leave when the other game is being held. The two-hour gap between the games was to allow Araneta Coliseum personnel to clear the arena for the second game. During last year's finals series between Ateneo and La Salle, the crowd was estimated to be at least 22,000.

== Men's tournament ==
=== Teams ===
| Team | University | Coach |
|---|---|---|
| Adamson Soaring Falcons | Adamson University (AdU) | (Philippines) Leo Austria |
| Ateneo Blue Eagles | Ateneo de Manila University (ADMU) | (United States) Norman Black |
| De La Salle Green Archers | De La Salle University (DLSU) | (Philippines) Franz Pumaren |
| FEU Tamaraws | Far Eastern University (FEU) | (Philippines) Glenn Capacio |
| NU Bulldogs | National University (NU) | (Philippines) Manny Dandan |
| UE Red Warriors | University of the East (UE) | (Philippines) Lawrence Chongson |
| UP Fighting Maroons | University of the Philippines Diliman (UP) | (Philippines) Aboy Castro |
| UST Growling Tigers | University of Santo Tomas (UST) | (Philippines) Pido Jarencio |

=== Elimination round ===
==== Team standings ====
| Pos | Team | W | L | PCT | GB | Qualification |
|---|---|---|---|---|---|---|
| 1 | Ateneo Blue Eagles | 13 | 1 | .929 | — | Twice-to-beat in the semifinals |
| 2 | FEU Tamaraws (H) | 11 | 3 | .786 | 2 | Twice-to-beat in the semifinals |
| 3 | UE Red Warriors | 10 | 4 | .714 | 3 | Twice-to-win in the semifinals |
| 4 | UST Growling Tigers | 6 | 8 | .429 | 7 | Twice-to-win in the semifinals |
| 5 | Adamson Soaring Falcons | 5 | 9 | .357 (Note: Head-to-head record: Adamson 1–1 La Salle (Adamson +5)) | 8 | |
| 6 | De La Salle Green Archers | 5 | 9 | .357 | 8 | |
| 7 | NU Bulldogs | 3 | 11 | .214 (Note: Head-to-head record: NU 1–1 UP (NU +8)) | 10 | |
| 8 | UP Fighting Maroons | 3 | 11 | .214 | 10 | |

Source: ABS-CBN Sports
Rules for classification: 1) winning percentage; 2) if tied for #2 or #4, one-game playoff; 3) head-to-head record; 4) head-to-head point differential; 5) overall point differential
(H) Hosts

==== Match-up results ====
| | Round 1 | | | | | | | Round 2 | | | | | | |
| Team ╲ Game | 1 | 2 | 3 | 4 | 5 | 6 | 7 | 8 | 9 | 10 | 11 | 12 | 13 | 14 |
|---|---|---|---|---|---|---|---|---|---|---|---|---|---|---|
| Adamson | UST school colors | UP school colors | FEU school colors | La Salle school colors | Ateneo school colors | UE school colors | NU school colors | La Salle school colors | UE school colors | NU school colors | FEU school colors | Ateneo school colors | UST school colors | UP school colors |
| Ateneo | FEU school colors | UE school colors | UST school colors | UP school colors | Adamson school colors | NU school colors | La Salle school colors | UE school colors | La Salle school colors | UST school colors | NU school colors | Adamson school colors | UP school colors | FEU school colors |
| La Salle | UE school colors | FEU school colors | UP school colors | Adamson school colors | NU school colors | UST school colors | Ateneo school colors | Adamson school colors | Ateneo school colors | UP school colors | UE school colors | UST school colors | FEU school colors | NU school colors |
| FEU | Ateneo school colors | La Salle school colors | Adamson school colors | NU school colors | UP school colors | UST school colors | UE school colors | UST school colors | NU school colors | UE school colors | Adamson school colors | UP school colors | La Salle school colors | Ateneo school colors |
| NU | UP school colors | UST school colors | UE school colors | FEU school colors | La Salle school colors | Ateneo school colors | Adamson school colors | UP school colors | FEU school colors | Adamson school colors | Ateneo school colors | UST school colors | UE school colors | La Salle school colors |
| UE | La Salle school colors | Ateneo school colors | NU school colors | UST school colors | Adamson school colors | UP school colors | FEU school colors | Ateneo school colors | Adamson school colors | FEU school colors | La Salle school colors | UP school colors | NU school colors | UST school colors |
| UP | NU school colors | Adamson school colors | La Salle school colors | Ateneo school colors | FEU school colors | UE school colors | UST school colors | NU school colors | UST school colors | La Salle school colors | FEU school colors | UE school colors | Ateneo school colors | Adamson school colors |
| UST | Adamson school colors | NU school colors | Ateneo school colors | UE school colors | La Salle school colors | FEU school colors | UP school colors | FEU school colors | UP school colors | Ateneo school colors | NU school colors | La Salle school colors | Adamson school colors | UE school colors |

= Win; = OT win; = Loss; = OT loss

==== Results ====
Results to the right and top of the gray cells are first round games, those to the left and below are second round games.

| Team | AdU | ADMU | DLSU | FEU | NU | UE | UP | UST |
|---|---|---|---|---|---|---|---|---|
| Adamson Soaring Falcons | | 51–61 | 63–64* | 60–63 | 70–76 | 91–95** | 72–68 | 75–76 |
| Ateneo Blue Eagles | 61–52 | | 76–72* | 63–59 | 75–47 | 72–57 | 58–68 | 93–77 |
| De La Salle Green Archers | 55–61 | 65–81 | | 51–65 | 68–48 | 46–65 | 73–63 | 101–92** |
| FEU Tamaraws | 84–75 | 73–74 | 71–69* | | 82–57 | 76–72 | 75–67 | 90–63 |
| NU Bulldogs | 50–79 | 54–75 | 63–61 | 66–76 | | 59–73 | 74–64 | 89–104 |
| UE Red Warriors | 60–56 | 75–80 | 66–64 | 87–72 | 70–58 | | 77–69* | 88–92 |
| UP Fighting Maroons | 61–74 | 75–93 | 83–78 | 74–86 | 78–76 | 72–81 | | 85–95 |
| UST Growling Tigers | 64–83 | 70–80 | 64–68 | 67–75 | 79–58 | 67–77 | 93–88 | |

Legend: Blue = left column team win; Red = top row team win.
Matches with lighter background shading were decided after overtime.

=== Bracket ===
Semifinals (Top 2 twice-to-beat)
1 | Ateneo | 81
4 | UST | 64
2 | FEU | 74 | 72
3 | UE | 84 | 78

Finals (Best-of-three playoff)
1 | Ateneo | 78 | 68 | 71
3 | UE | 71 | 88 | 58

=== Semifinals ===
==== (1) Ateneo vs. (4) UST ====
The Ateneo Blue Eagles had the twice-to-beat advantage.

Studio 23

September 20

| Ateneo Blue Eagles | 81–64 | UST Growling Tigers |
Ateneo wins series in one game

Araneta Coliseum, Quezon City

==== (2) FEU vs. (3) UE ====
The FEU Tamaraws had the twice-to-beat advantage.

Studio 23

September 19

| FEU Tamaraws | 74–84 | UE Red Warriors |

Araneta Coliseum, Quezon City

Studio 23

September 24

| FEU Tamaraws | 72–78 | UE Red Warriors |
UE wins series in two games

Araneta Coliseum, Quezon City

=== Finals ===
Studio 23

October 1

| Ateneo Blue Eagles | 78–71 | UE Red Warriors |

Araneta Coliseum, Quezon City

Studio 23

October 4

| Ateneo Blue Eagles | 68–88 | UE Red Warriors |

Araneta Coliseum, Quezon City

Studio 23

October 8

| Ateneo Blue Eagles | 71–58 | UE Red Warriors |
Ateneo wins series 2–1

Araneta Coliseum, Quezon City

- Finals Most Valuable Player: Rabeh Al-Hussaini (Ateneo Blue Eagles)

=== Awards ===
UAAP Season 72 men's basketball champions
Ateneo Blue Eagles
Fifth title, second consecutive title
(19th title including NCAA championships)

- Most Valuable Player: Dylan Ababou (UST Growling Tigers)
- Rookie of the Year: Jeric Teng (UST Growling Tigers)

== Women's tournament ==
The women's tournament started on July 15 with most of the games played at the Far Eastern University Gym in Manila.

=== Elimination round ===
==== Team standings ====
| Pos | Team | W | L | PCT | GB | Qualification |
|---|---|---|---|---|---|---|
| 1 | FEU Lady Tamaraws (H) | 13 | 1 | .929 | — | Twice-to-beat in the semifinals |
| 2 | Adamson Lady Falcons | 11 | 3 | .786 (Note: Second-seed playoff: Adamson 65–56 La Salle) | 2 | Twice-to-beat in the semifinals |
| 3 | De La Salle Lady Archers | 11 | 3 | .786 | 2 | Twice-to-win in the semifinals |
| 4 | UST Growling Tigresses | 8 | 6 | .571 | 5 | Twice-to-win in the semifinals |
| 5 | UP Lady Maroons | 5 | 9 | .357 | 8 | |
| 6 | Ateneo Lady Eagles | 4 | 10 | .286 | 9 | |
| 7 | NU Lady Bulldogs | 3 | 11 | .214 | 10 | |
| 8 | UE Lady Warriors | 1 | 13 | .071 | 12 | |

Source: ABS-CBN Sports
Rules for classification: 1) winning percentage; 2) if tied for #2 or #4, one-game playoff; 3) head-to-head record; 4) head-to-head point differential; 5) overall point differential
(H) Hosts

==== Match-up results ====
| | Round 1 | | | | | | | Round 2 | | | | | | |
| Team ╲ Game | 1 | 2 | 3 | 4 | 5 | 6 | 7 | 8 | 9 | 10 | 11 | 12 | 13 | 14 |
|---|---|---|---|---|---|---|---|---|---|---|---|---|---|---|
| AdU | UP school colors | UE school colors | FEU school colors | La Salle school colors | Ateneo school colors | NU school colors | UST school colors | La Salle school colors | UP school colors | UST school colors | Ateneo school colors | NU school colors | UE school colors | FEU school colors |
| ADMU | UE school colors | UP school colors | NU school colors | FEU school colors | Adamson school colors | UST school colors | La Salle school colors | UE school colors | FEU school colors | NU school colors | Adamson school colors | UST school colors | La Salle school colors | UP school colors |
| DLSU | NU school colors | FEU school colors | UE school colors | Adamson school colors | UST school colors | UP school colors | Ateneo school colors | Adamson school colors | NU school colors | FEU school colors | UE school colors | UP school colors | Ateneo school colors | UST school colors |
| FEU | UST school colors | La Salle school colors | Adamson school colors | Ateneo school colors | NU school colors | UE school colors | UP school colors | UST school colors | Ateneo school colors | La Salle school colors | NU school colors | UE school colors | UP school colors | Adamson school colors |
| NU | La Salle school colors | UST school colors | Ateneo school colors | UP school colors | FEU school colors | Adamson school colors | UE school colors | UP school colors | La Salle school colors | Ateneo school colors | FEU school colors | Adamson school colors | UST school colors | UE school colors |
| UE | Ateneo school colors | Adamson school colors | La Salle school colors | UST school colors | UP school colors | FEU school colors | NU school colors | Ateneo school colors | UST school colors | UP school colors | La Salle school colors | FEU school colors | Adamson school colors | NU school colors |
| UP | Adamson school colors | Ateneo school colors | UST school colors | NU school colors | UE school colors | La Salle school colors | FEU school colors | NU school colors | Adamson school colors | UE school colors | UST school colors | La Salle school colors | FEU school colors | Ateneo school colors |
| UST | FEU school colors | NU school colors | UP school colors | UE school colors | La Salle school colors | Ateneo school colors | Adamson school colors | FEU school colors | UE school colors | Adamson school colors | UP school colors | Ateneo school colors | NU school colors | La Salle school colors |

= Win; = OT win; = Loss; = OT loss

==== Results ====
| Team | AdU | ADMU | DLSU | FEU | NU | UE | UP | UST |
|---|---|---|---|---|---|---|---|---|
| Adamson | | 80–60 | 55–57 | 60–52 | 53–46 | 114–63 | 66–57 | 80–66 |
| Ateneo | 59–83 | | 34–41 | 33–46 | 50–35 | 75–40 | 47–48 | 62–66 |
| La Salle | 61–57 | 68–44 | | 46–53 | 66–51 | 84–72 | 61–55 | 66–68 |
| FEU | 52–51 | 51–45 | 56–46 | | 54–38 | 75–43 | 43–42 | 68–43 |
| NU | 61–72 | 49–63 | 49–53 | 33–67 | | 71–61 | 59–47 | 50–61 |
| UE | 69–90 | 38–68 | 52–60 | 36–75 | 50–64 | | 60–73 | 61–73 |
| UP | 59–77 | 57–45 | 36–72 | 47–66 | 57–55 | 45–50 | | 55–49 |
| UST | 71–85 | 70–45 | 67–73 | 52–65 | 50–46 | 96–69 | 62–56 | |

Legend: Blue = left column team win; Red = top row team win.
Matches with lighter background shading were decided after overtime.

=== Second seed playoff ===
September 16

| De La Salle Lady Archers | 56–65 | Adamson Lady Falcons |

Far Eastern University Gym, Manila

=== Bracket ===
Semifinals (Top 2 twice-to-beat)
1 | FEU | 74
4 | UST | 71
2 | Adamson | 55
3 | La Salle | 50

Finals (Best-of-three playoff)
1 | FEU | 51 | 50
2 | Adamson | 58 | 64

=== Semifinals ===
==== (1) FEU vs. (4) UST ====
September 19

| FEU Lady Tamaraws | 74–71 | UST Growling Tigresses |
FEU wins series in one game

PhilSports Arena, Pasig

==== (2) Adamson vs. (3) La Salle ====
September 19

| Adamson Lady Falcons | 55–50 | De La Salle Lady Archers |
Adamson wins series in one game

PhilSports Arena, Pasig

=== Finals ===
Studio 23

October 3

| FEU Lady Tamaraws | 51–58 | Adamson Lady Falcons |

Filoil Flying V Arena, San Juan

Studio 23

October 6

| FEU Lady Tamaraws | 50–64 | Adamson Lady Falcons |
Adamson wins series 2–0

Filoil Flying V Arena, San Juan

- Finals Most Valuable Player: Analyn Almazan (Adamson Lady Falcons)

=== Awards ===
UAAP Season 72 women's basketball champions
Adamson Lady Falcons
Fifth title

- Most Valuable Player: Analyn Almazan (Adamson Lady Falcons)
- Rookie of the Year: Miller Joy Ong (De La Salle Lady Archers)

== Juniors' tournament ==
=== Elimination round ===
==== Team standings ====
| Pos | Team | W | L | PCT | GB | Qualification |
|---|---|---|---|---|---|---|
| 1 | Zobel Junior Archers | 12 | 2 | .857 | — | Twice-to-beat in the semifinals |
| 2 | UST Tiger Cubs | 11 | 3 | .786 | 1 | Twice-to-beat in the semifinals |
| 3 | Ateneo Blue Eaglets | 10 | 4 | .714 (Note: Head-to-head record: Ateneo 1–1 FEU (Ateneo +4)) | 2 | Twice-to-win in the semifinals |
| 4 | FEU–D Baby Tamaraws (H) | 10 | 4 | .714 | 2 | Twice-to-win in the semifinals |
| 5 | UE Junior Red Warriors | 6 | 8 | .429 | 6 | |
| 6 | Adamson Baby Falcons | 5 | 9 | .357 | 7 | |
| 7 | NUNS Bullpups | 2 | 12 | .143 | 10 | |
| 8 | UPIS Junior Fighting Maroons | 0 | 14 | .000 | 12 | |

Source: ABS-CBN Sports
Rules for classification: 1) winning percentage; 2) if tied for #2 or #4, one-game playoff; 3) head-to-head record; 4) head-to-head point differential; 5) overall point differential
(H) Hosts

==== Match-up results ====
| | Round 1 | | | | | | | Round 2 | | | | | | |
| Team ╲ Game | 1 | 2 | 3 | 4 | 5 | 6 | 7 | 8 | 9 | 10 | 11 | 12 | 13 | 14 |
|---|---|---|---|---|---|---|---|---|---|---|---|---|---|---|
| AdU | FEU school colors | UP school colors | Ateneo school colors | UST school colors | UE school colors | NU school colors | La Salle school colors | NU school colors | La Salle school colors | UP school colors | FEU school colors | Ateneo school colors | UST school colors | UE school colors |
| ADMU | La Salle school colors | UST school colors | Adamson school colors | UE school colors | NU school colors | UP school colors | FEU school colors | La Salle school colors | NU school colors | UST school colors | UP school colors | Adamson school colors | UE school colors | FEU school colors |
| DLSU | Ateneo school colors | NU school colors | FEU school colors | UP school colors | UST school colors | UE school colors | Adamson school colors | Ateneo school colors | Adamson school colors | FEU school colors | UE school colors | NU school colors | UP school colors | UST school colors |
| FEU | Adamson school colors | UE school colors | La Salle school colors | NU school colors | UP school colors | UST school colors | Ateneo school colors | UST school colors | UP school colors | La Salle school colors | Adamson school colors | UE school colors | NU school colors | Ateneo school colors |
| NU | UST school colors | La Salle school colors | UE school colors | FEU school colors | Ateneo school colors | Adamson school colors | UP school colors | Adamson school colors | Ateneo school colors | UE school colors | UST school colors | La Salle school colors | FEU school colors | UP school colors |
| UE | UP school colors | FEU school colors | NU school colors | Ateneo school colors | Adamson school colors | La Salle school colors | UST school colors | UP school colors | UST school colors | NU school colors | La Salle school colors | FEU school colors | Ateneo school colors | Adamson school colors |
| UP | UE school colors | Adamson school colors | UST school colors | La Salle school colors | FEU school colors | Ateneo school colors | NU school colors | UE school colors | FEU school colors | Adamson school colors | Ateneo school colors | UST school colors | La Salle school colors | NU school colors |
| UST | NU school colors | Ateneo school colors | UP school colors | Adamson school colors | La Salle school colors | FEU school colors | UE school colors | FEU school colors | UE school colors | Ateneo school colors | NU school colors | UP school colors | Adamson school colors | La Salle school colors |

= Win; = OT win; = Loss; = OT loss

==== Results ====
| Home \ Away | AdU | ADMU | DLSZ | FEU | NSNU | UE | UPIS | UST |
|---|---|---|---|---|---|---|---|---|
| Adamson | | 74–102 | 58–79 | 58–74 | 100–91* | 87–84* | 96–64 | 60–74 |
| Ateneo | 77–54 | | 78–100 | 59–51 | 98–62 | 101–68 | 94–50 | 73–82 |
| La Salle | 98–62 | 78–84 | | 82–65 | 92–65 | 99–61 | 86–36 | 71–69 |
| FEU | 77–61 | 84–80* | 74–77** | | 76–54 | 62–70 | 88–48 | 76–74 |
| NSNU | 54–66 | 69–96 | 54–112 | 56–96 | | 50–57 | 84–77 | 48–118 |
| UE | 59–44 | 61–78 | 60–86 | 49–77 | 82–57 | | 80–56 | 67–104 |
| UP | 59–76 | 53–84 | 57–121 | 55–104 | 82–93 | 53–82 | | 91–50 |
| UST | 107–69 | 75–72 | 65–60 | 43–60 | 100–69 | 97–71 | 106–54 | |

Legend: Blue = home team win; Yellow = draw; Red = away team win.

=== Bracket ===
Semifinals (Top 2 twice-to-beat)
1 | DLSZ | 86
4 | FEU–FERN | 69
2 | UST | 66 | 68
3 | Ateneo | 72 | 73

Finals (Best-of-three playoff)
1 | DLSZ | 73 | 57 | 56
3 | Ateneo | 80 | 53 | 61

=== Semifinals ===
==== (1) DLSZ vs. (4) FEU–FERN ====
DLSZ has the twice-to-beat advantage.

September 19

| Zobel Junior Archers | 86–69 | FEU–FERN Baby Tamaraws |
La Salle wins series in one game

Filoil Flying V Arena, San Juan

==== (2) UST vs. (3) Ateneo ====
UST has the twice-to-beat advantage.

September 19

| UST Tiger Cubs | 66–72 | Ateneo Blue Eaglets |

Filoil Flying V Arena, San Juan

September 22

| UST Tiger Cubs | 68–73 | Ateneo Blue Eaglets |
Ateneo wins series in two games

Filoil Flying V Arena, San Juan

=== Finals ===
Studio 23

October 3

| Zobel Junior Archers | 73–80 | Ateneo Blue Eaglets |

Filoil Flying V Arena, San Juan

Studio 23

October 6

| Zobel Junior Archers | 57–53 | Ateneo Blue Eaglets |

Filoil Flying V Arena, San Juan

Studio 23

October 8

| Zobel Junior Archers | 56–61 | Ateneo Blue Eaglets |
Ateneo wins series 2–1

Araneta Coliseum, Quezon City

- Finals Most Valuable Player: Kiefer Ravena (Ateneo Blue Eaglets)

=== Awards ===
UAAP Season 72 juniors' basketball champions
Ateneo Blue Eaglets
16th title, second consecutive title

- Most Valuable Player: Ron Javier (UST Tiger Cubs)
- Rookie of the Year: Kevin Ferrer (UST Tiger Cubs)

== See also ==
- NCAA Season 85 basketball tournaments

| Preceded by Season 71 (2008) | UAAP basketball seasons Season 72 (2009) | Succeeded by Season 73 (2010) |
