= UAAP Season 71 =

- "Filipino Leadership through Sports Excellence"
- Host school: University of the Philippines

Overall
- Seniors: University of Santo Tomas
- Juniors: University of Santo Tomas

Seniors' champions
Sport		Men	Women
Basketball		Ateneo	FEU
Volleyball		UST	La Salle
Chess		FEU	La Salle
Table tennis		UST	FEU
Taekwondo		UST	UST
Judo		Ateneo	UP
Swimming		UST	Ateneo
Beach Volleyball		UST	FEU
Track and field		FEU	FEU
Football		UP	UST
Fencing		UST	UE
Tennis		La Salle	UST
Badminton		UE	FEU
Baseball		Adamson	NT
Softball		NT	Adamson
- Cheerdance: UP (Ex - Coed)

Juniors' champions
Sport		Boys	Girls
Basketball		Ateneo	NT
Volleyball		UE	UST
Chess		Adamson	
Table tennis		UST	
Taekwondo		UE	
Judo		Ateneo	
Swimming		Ateneo	UST
Beach Volleyball		Ateneo	
Track and field		Ateneo	
Football		Ateneo	
- (NT) = No tournament; (DS) = Demonstration Sport; (Ex) = Exhibition;

UAAP Season 71 was the 2008–2009 season of the University Athletic Association of the Philippines. The University of the Philippines (UP) hosted this season, which coincided with the centennial anniversary of the University's establishment. It opened on July 5, 2008 with an elaborate ceremony held at the Araneta Coliseum.

== Universal rules ==
- Two-round eliminations, the top 4 teams enter the semifinals, with the top 2 seeds possessing the twice-to-beat advantage. Semifinal winners play in the best-of-three finals.
- If there are ties in the standings, the standard tiebreaking procedure will be used per sport, except for the last seed, in which an extra game will be held to break the tie.
  - Exception: In basketball and volleyball, an extra game will be played regardless of the position and tiebreaking procedure recommended in a sport.
- If a team wins all of their elimination round games, the postseason will be scrapped and that team will win the championship outright.
- Exceptions:
  - In basketball, the team that wins all elimination round games will have the thrice-to-beat advantage in the finals.
  - In volleyball, the team that wins all elimination round games advances outright to the finals.
  - In both instances, the #3 and #4 teams play for a berth to face the #2 seed with the twice-to-win advantage in the semifinals.

== Basketball ==
The UAAP Season 71 Basketball tournament began on July 5, 2008 at the Araneta Coliseum in Cubao, Quezon City. The tournament host was University of the Philippines and tournament commissioner was Andres "Chito" Narvasa, Jr.

=== Seniors division ===
==== Men's tournament ====
===== Elimination round =====
Pos	Team	W	L	PCT	GB	Qualification
1	Ateneo Blue Eagles	13	1	.929	—	Twice-to-beat in the semifinals
2	De La Salle Green Archers	10	4	.714 (Note: Second-seed playoff: La Salle 62–59 FEU)	3	Twice-to-beat in the semifinals
3	FEU Tamaraws	10	4	.714	3	Twice-to-win in the semifinals
4	UE Red Warriors	9	5	.643	4	Twice-to-win in the semifinals
5	UST Growling Tigers	6	8	.429	7	
6	UP Fighting Maroons (H)	3	11	.214 (Note: Head-to-head record: UP 2–0 Adamson)	10	
7	Adamson Soaring Falcons	3	11	.214	10	
8	NU Bulldogs	2	12	.143	11	

Source: ABS-CBN Sports
Rules for classification: 1) winning percentage; 2) if tied for #2 or #4, one-game playoff; 3) head-to-head record; 4) head-to-head point differential; 5) overall point differential
(H) Hosts

===== Playoffs =====
Semifinals (Top 2 twice-to-beat)
1	Ateneo	70
4	UE	50
2	La Salle	67
3	FEU	62

Finals (Best-of-three playoff)
1	Ateneo	69	62
2	La Salle	61	51

===== Awards =====
- Most Valuable Player: Rabeh Al-Hussaini (Ateneo Blue Eagles)
- Rookie of the Year: Ryan Buenafe (Ateneo Blue Eagles)

==== Women's tournament ====
===== Elimination round =====
Pos	Team	W	L	PCT	GB	Qualification
1	FEU Lady Tamaraws	13	1	.929	—	Twice-to-beat in the semifinals
2	UST Growling Tigresses	10	4	.714 (Note: Second-seed playoff: UST 69–64)	3	Twice-to-beat in the semifinals
3	UP Lady Maroons (H)	10	4	.714	3	Twice-to-win in the semifinals
4	Adamson Lady Falcons	9	5	.643	4	Twice-to-win in the semifinals
5	De La Salle Lady Archers	7	7	.500	6	
6	Ateneo Lady Eagles	4	10	.286	9	
7	UE Lady Warriors	2	12	.143	11	
8	NU Lady Bulldogs	1	13	.071	12	

Source: ABS-CBN Sports
Rules for classification: 1) winning percentage; 2) if tied for #2 or #4, one-game playoff; 3) head-to-head record; 4) head-to-head point differential; 5) overall point differential
(H) Hosts

===== Playoffs =====
Semifinals (Top 2 twice-to-beat)
1	FEU	56	74
4	Adamson	57	63
2	UST	39	46
3	UP	52	50

Finals (Best-of-three playoff)
1	FEU	54	52
3	UP	52	46

===== Awards =====
- Most Valuable Player: Marichu Bacaro (UST Growling Tigresses)
- Rookie of the Year: Angelica Ortega (Adamson Lady Falcons)

=== Juniors division ===
==== Boys' tournament ====
===== Elimination round =====
Pos	Team	W	L	PCT	GB	Qualification
1	Ateneo Blue Eaglets	12	2	.857 (Note: Head-to-head record: Ateneo 1–1 La Salle (Ateneo +2))	—	Twice-to-beat in the semifinals
2	Zobel Junior Archers	12	2	.857	—	Twice-to-beat in the semifinals
3	FEU–D Baby Tamaraws	9	5	.643 (Note: Head-to-head record: FEU 1–1 Adamson (FEU +10))	3	Twice-to-win in the semifinals
4	Adamson Baby Falcons	9	5	.643	3	Twice-to-win in the semifinals
5	UST Tiger Cubs	8	6	.571	4	
6	UE Junior Red Warriors	3	11	.214 (Note: Head-to-head record: UE 1–1 NU (UE +10))	9	
7	NUNS Bullpups	3	11	.214	9	
8	UPIS Junior Fighting Maroons (H)	0	14	.000	12	

Source: ABS-CBN Sports
Rules for classification: 1) winning percentage; 2) if tied for #2 or #4, one-game playoff; 3) head-to-head record; 4) head-to-head point differential; 5) overall point differential
(H) Hosts

===== Playoffs =====
Semifinals (Top 2 twice-to-beat)
1	Ateneo	78
4	Adamson	45
2	La Salle Zobel	70	56
3	FEU–FERN	72**	58

Finals (Best-of-three playoff)
1	Ateneo	72	71
3	FEU–FERN	62	60

**Double overtime

===== Awards =====
- Most Valuable Player: Mark Kevin Juruena (Adamson Baby Falcons)
- Rookie of the Year: Luis Alfonso dela Paz (Zobel Junior Archers)

== Volleyball ==
=== Seniors division ===
==== Men's tournament ====
===== Elimination round =====
====== Team standings ======
Rank	Team	W	L	PCT	GB	Tie
1	UST Growling Tigers	14	0	1.000	--	
2	De La Salle Green Archers	10	4	.714	4	
3	UP Fighting Maroons	9	5	.643	5	
4	Ateneo Blue Eagles	9	5	.643	5	
5	Adamson Soaring Falcons	6	8	.429	8	2-0
6	FEU Tamaraws	6	8	.429	8	0-2
7	UE Red Warriors	2	12	.083	12	
8	NU Bulldogs	0	14	.000	14	

Qualified to the Finals with the twice-to-beat advantage
Qualified to the Finals

Tiebreakers:

- UP defeated Ateneo 3–2 in the third-seed game.
- Adamson defeated FEU in both of their elimination round games.

===== Playoffs =====
3rd-seed playoff
2	Ateneo	2
5	UP	3

Semifinals; Top seeds twice-to-beat
1	UST	3
4	Ateneo	0
2	La Salle	0	1
3	UP	3	3

Finals; Best-of-three series
1	UST	3	3
3	UP	0	0

===== Awards =====
- Most Valuable Player: Ray Karl Dimaculangan (UST Growling Tigers)
- Best Digger: Henry James Pecaña (UST Growling Tigers)
- Best Server: Ray Karl Dimaculangan (UST Growling Tigers)
- Best Attacker: Jayson Ramos (UST Growling Tigers)
- Best Blocker: Lloyd Arden Belgado (UP Fighting Maroons)
- Best Receiver: Bernardino Casanova (De La Salle Green Archers)
- Best Setter: Gerard Magtoto (UP Fighting Maroons)

==== Women's tournament ====
===== Elimination round =====
====== Team standings ======
Rank	Team	GP	W	L	PCT	Tie
1	De La Salle Lady Archers	14	13	1	.929	
2	FEU Lady Tamaraws	14	12	2	.857	
3	UST Growling Tigresses	14	9	5	.643	
4	Adamson Lady Falcons	14	9	5	.643	
5	Ateneo Lady Eagles	14	6	8	.429	
6	UE Lady Warriors	14	3	11	.214	
7	UP Lady Maroons	14	3	11	.214	
8	NU Lady Bulldogs	14	1	13	.071	

Qualified to the Finals with the twice-to-beat advantage
Qualified to the Finals

===== Playoffs =====
3rd-seed playoff
2	Adamson	0
5	UST	3

Semifinals; Top seeds twice-to-beat
1	La Salle	3
4	Adamson	1
2	FEU	3
3	UST	1

Finals; Best-of-three series
1	La Salle	2	3	3
2	FEU	3	1	1

===== Awards =====
- Most Valuable Player: Manilla Santos (De La Salle Lady Archers)
- Rookie of the Year: Melissa Gohing (De La Salle Lady Archers)
- Best Blocker: Jacqueline Alarca (De La Salle Lady Archers)
- Best Server: Rachel Daquis (FEU Lady Tamaraws)
- Best Receiver: Manilla Santos (De La Salle Lady Archers)
- Best Setter: April Linor Jose (FEU Lady Tamaraws)
- Best Digger: Lizlee Ann Gata (Adamson Lady Falcons)
- Best Attacker: Manilla Santos (De La Salle Lady Archers)
- Best Scorer: Aiza Maizo (UST Growling Tigresses)

=== Juniors division ===
==== Boys' tournament ====
===== Elimination round =====
====== Team standings ======
Rank	Team	GP	W	L	PCT	Tie
1	UE Red Pages	10	10	0	1.000	
2	Ateneo Blue Eaglets	10	7	3	.700	
3	UST Tiger Cubs	10	7	3	.700	
	Zobel Junior Archers					
	NUNS Bullpups					
	UPIS Junior Fighting Maroons					

With UE sweeping the elimination round, the Red Pages were declared automatic champions and the Finals was not held.

===== Awards =====
- Most Valuable Player: Michael Reyes (UE Junior Red Warriors)
- Rookie of the Year: Karl Roque (UE Junior Red Warriors)

==== Girls' tournament ====
===== Elimination round =====
====== Team standings ======
Rank	Team	GP	W	L	PCT
1	UST Junior Tigresses	6	6	0	1.000
	UE Junior Amazons				
	Zobel Junior Archers				
	UPIS Junior Lady Maroons				

With UST sweeping the elimination round, the Tigress Cubs were declared automatic champions and the Finals was not held.

===== Awards =====
- Most Valuable Player: Alyssa Valdez (UST Junior Tigresses)
- Rookie of the Year: Jelly Buan (UST Junior Tigresses)

== Beach volleyball ==
The UAAP Beach Volleyball tournament started on September 6, 2008 at the University of the East Caloocan Grounds. UST and FEU were declared outright champions after sweeping the men's and women's tournaments, respectively.

=== Men's tournament ===
Team	W	L	GB
UST Growling Tigers	7	0	--
FEU Tamaraws	6	1	1
Adamson Soaring Falcons	5	2	2
UP Fighting Maroons	3	4	4
De La Salle Green Archers	3	4	4
NU Bulldogs	2	5	5
UE Red Warriors	1	6	6
Ateneo Blue Eagles	1	6	6

==== Awards ====
- Most Valuable Player: Henry James Pecana (UST Growling Tigers)
- Rookie of the Year: Dominico Ramon Lucindo (UP Fighting Maroons)

=== Women's tournament ===
Team	W	L	GB
FEU Lady Tamaraws	7	0	--
UE Lady Warriors	6	1	1
UST Growling Tigresses	5	2	2
Adamson Lady Falcons	4	3	3
NU Lady Bulldogs	3	4	4
De La Salle Lady Archers	2	5	5
Ateneo Lady Eagles	1	6	6
UP Lady Maroons	0	7	7

==== Awards ====
- Most Valuable Player: Anna Camille Abanto (FEU Lady Tamaraws)
- Rookie of the Year: Melissa Gohing (De La Salle Lady Archers)

== Football ==
The UAAP Football tournament opened on January 18, 2009. Games were played at the Erenchun and Ocampo Football Fields of the Ateneo de Manila University.

=== Men's tournament ===
==== Elimination round ====
===== Team standings =====
Pos	Team	Pld	W	D	L	GF	GA	GD	Pts
1	FEU Tamaraws	10	6	2	2	16	6	+10	20
2	UP Fighting Maroons	10	5	4	1	10	6	+4	19
3	De La Salle Green Archers	10	4	2	4	4	8	−4	14
4	UST Growling Tigers	10	3	2	5	8	12	−4	11
5	UE Red Warriors	10	2	3	5	7	10	−3	9
6	Ateneo Blue Eagles	10	2	3	5	6	9	−3	9

Qualified to the Finals with the twice-to-beat advantage
Qualified to the Finals

===== Match-up results =====
	Round 1					Round 2				
Team ╲ Game	1	2	3	4	5	6	7	8	9	10
Ateneo	UE school colors	UST school colors	La Salle school colors	UP school colors	FEU school colors	UP school colors	FEU school colors	La Salle school colors	UE school colors	UST school colors
La Salle	FEU school colors	UP school colors	Ateneo school colors	UE school colors	UST school colors	UE school colors	UST school colors	Ateneo school colors	FEU school colors	UP school colors
FEU	La Salle school colors	UE school colors	UP school colors	UST school colors	Ateneo school colors	UST school colors	Ateneo school colors	UP school colors	La Salle school colors	UE school colors
UE	Ateneo school colors	FEU school colors	UST school colors	La Salle school colors	UP school colors	La Salle school colors	UP school colors	UST school colors	Ateneo school colors	FEU school colors
UP	UST school colors	La Salle school colors	FEU school colors	Ateneo school colors	UE school colors	Ateneo school colors	UE school colors	FEU school colors	UST school colors	La Salle school colors
UST	UP school colors	Ateneo school colors	UE school colors	FEU school colors	La Salle school colors	FEU school colors	La Salle school colors	UE school colors	UP school colors	Ateneo school colors

= Win; = Draw; = Loss

==== Finals ====
FEU had the twice to beat advantage.

February 26

UP Fighting Maroons	2–1	FEU Tamaraws

Erenchun Field, Ateneo de Manila University, Quezon City
March 3

UP Fighting Maroons	1–0	FEU Tamaraws

Erenchun Field, Ateneo de Manila University, Quezon City

=== Women's tournament ===
==== Elimination round ====
===== Team standings =====
Pos	Team	Pld	W	D	L	GF	GA	GD	Pts
1	De La Salle Lady Archers	8	6	2	0	16	1	+15	20
2	UST Growling Tigresses	8	5	2	1	12	3	+9	17
3	FEU Lady Tamaraws	8	3	3	2	11	6	+5	12
4	Ateneo Lady Eagles	8	1	2	5	2	16	−14	5
5	UP Lady Maroons	8	0	1	7	2	15	−13	1

Qualified to the Finals with the twice-to-beat advantage
Qualified to the Finals

===== Match-up results =====
	Round 1				Round 2			
Team ╲ Game	1	2	3	4	5	6	7	8
Ateneo	UST school colors	FEU school colors	La Salle school colors	UP school colors	FEU school colors	La Salle school colors	UST school colors	UP school colors
La Salle	UP school colors	UST school colors	Ateneo school colors	FEU school colors	Ateneo school colors	UP school colors	UST school colors	FEU school colors
FEU	Ateneo school colors	UP school colors	La Salle school colors	UST school colors	Ateneo school colors	UST school colors	UP school colors	La Salle school colors
UP	La Salle school colors	FEU school colors	UST school colors	Ateneo school colors	UST school colors	La Salle school colors	FEU school colors	Ateneo school colors
UST	Ateneo school colors	La Salle school colors	UP school colors	FEU school colors	UP school colors	FEU school colors	Ateneo school colors	La Salle school colors

= Win; = Draw; = Loss

==== Finals ====
La Salle had the twice to beat advantage.

February 26

UST Growling Tigresses	2–0 (aet)	De La Salle Lady Archers

Erenchun Field, Ateneo de Manila University, Quezon City
March 3

UST Growling Tigresses	1–1 (aet) 4–1 (pso)	De La Salle Lady Archers

Erenchun Field, Ateneo de Manila University, Quezon City

== Baseball ==
The UAAP Baseball tournament opened on January 11, 2009. Games were played at the Rizal Memorial Baseball Stadium.

=== Men's tournament ===
==== Elimination round ====
===== Team standings =====
Team	W	L	GB
Adamson Soaring Falcons	10	0	--
UP Fighting Maroons	7	3	3
Ateneo Blue Eagles	6	4	4
UST Growling Tigers	4	6	6
NU Bulldogs	3	7	7
De La Salle Green Archers	0	10	10

===== Match-up results =====
	Round 1					Round 2				
Team ╲ Game	1	2	3	4	5	6	7	8	9	10
Adamson	La Salle school colors	Ateneo school colors	NU school colors	UP school colors	UST school colors	La Salle school colors	NU school colors	UST school colors	UP school colors	Ateneo school colors
Ateneo	UST school colors	Adamson school colors	UP school colors	La Salle school colors	NU school colors	NU school colors	UP school colors	La Salle school colors	UST school colors	Adamson school colors
La Salle	Adamson school colors	NU school colors	UST school colors	Ateneo school colors	UP school colors	Adamson school colors	UST school colors	Ateneo school colors	NU school colors	UP school colors
NU	UP school colors	La Salle school colors	Adamson school colors	UST school colors	Ateneo school colors	Ateneo school colors	Adamson school colors	UP school colors	La Salle school colors	UST school colors
UP	NU school colors	UST school colors	Ateneo school colors	Adamson school colors	La Salle school colors	UST school colors	Ateneo school colors	NU school colors	Adamson school colors	La Salle school colors
UST	Ateneo school colors	UP school colors	La Salle school colors	NU school colors	Adamson school colors	UP school colors	La Salle school colors	Adamson school colors	Ateneo school colors	NU school colors

= Win; = Loss

== Softball ==
The UAAP Softball tournament opened on January 10, 2009. Games were played at the UST Open Field.

=== Women's tournament ===
==== Elimination round ====
===== Team standings =====
Team	W	L	GB
Adamson Lady Falcons	10	0	--
UST Growling Tigresses	6	4	4
UE Lady Warriors	5	5	5
UP Lady Maroons	5	5	5
Ateneo Lady Eagles	4	6	6
De La Salle Lady Archers	0	10	10

===== Match-up results =====
	Round 1					Round 2				
Team ╲ Game	1	2	3	4	5	6	7	8	9	10
Adamson	La Salle school colors	UST school colors	Ateneo school colors	UE school colors	UP school colors	La Salle school colors	UE school colors	Ateneo school colors	UST school colors	UP school colors
Ateneo	UP school colors	UE school colors	Adamson school colors	La Salle school colors	UST school colors	UST school colors	La Salle school colors	Adamson school colors	UP school colors	UE school colors
La Salle	Adamson school colors	UP school colors	UST school colors	Ateneo school colors	UE school colors	Adamson school colors	Ateneo school colors	UP school colors	UE school colors	UST school colors
UE	UST school colors	Ateneo school colors	UP school colors	Adamson school colors	La Salle school colors	UP school colors	Adamson school colors	UST school colors	La Salle school colors	Ateneo school colors
UP	Ateneo school colors	La Salle school colors	UE school colors	UST school colors	Adamson school colors	UE school colors	UST school colors	La Salle school colors	Ateneo school colors	Adamson school colors
UST	UE school colors	Adamson school colors	La Salle school colors	UP school colors	Ateneo school colors	Ateneo school colors	UP school colors	UE school colors	Adamson school colors	La Salle school colors

= Win; = Loss

== Chess ==
The UAAP Season 71 Chess tournament started on August 9, 2008, at the Tan Yan Kee Student Center of the University of Santo Tomas.

=== Seniors division ===
==== Men's tournament ====
===== Team standings =====
Standings after 12 rounds

Team	Points
FEU Tamaraws	36.0
UST Growling Tigers	33.5
Adamson Soaring Falcons	33.0
De La Salle Green Archers	31.5
UE Red Warriors	29.5
NU Bulldogs	25.5
UP Fighting Maroons	24.5
Ateneo Blue Eagles	10.5

===== Awards =====
- Most Valuable Player: John Paul Gomez (De La Salle Green Archers)
- Rookie of the Year: Sheider Nebato (FEU Tamaraws)

==== Women's tournament ====
===== Team standings =====
Standings after 12 rounds

Team	Points	TB
De La Salle Lady Archers	35.0	
FEU Lady Tamaraws	35.0	
UST Growling Tigresses	28.0	
UP Lady Maroons	25.5	
UE Lady Warriors	23.0	
Ateneo Lady Eagles	17.0	
NU Lady Bulldogs	4.0	

===== Awards =====
- Most Valuable Player: Aices Salvador (De La Salle Lady Archers)
- Rookie of the Year: Jedara Docena (FEU Lady Tamaraws)

=== Juniors division ===
==== Boys' tournament ====
===== Team standings =====
Standings after 12 rounds

Team	Points
Adamson Baby Falcons	36.5
UE Red Pages	33.5
Ateneo Blue Eaglets	32.5
FEU–D Baby Tamaraws	26.5
NUNS Bullpups	26
UST Tiger Cubs	7.5
Zobel Junior Archers	5.5

===== Awards =====
- Most Valuable Player: Gabriel Layugan (Ateneo Blue Eaglets)
- Rookie of the Year: Dominique Lagula (FEU–D Baby Tamaraws)

== Taekwondo ==
The UAAP Season 71 Taekwondo tournaments were held on September 13 and September 17, 2008 at the Far Eastern University Gym.

=== Seniors division ===
==== Men's tournament ====
===== Team standings =====
Final.

Team	W	L	GB
UST Growling Tigers	5	0	-
Ateneo Blue Eagles	4	1	-
FEU Tamaraws	3	2	-
UP Fighting Maroons	3	3	-
UE Red Warriors			-
De La Salle Green Archers			-

===== Awards =====
- Most Valuable Player: Jurrie Bernardino (UST Growling Tigers)
- Rookie of the Year: Dane Pio de Roda (UST Growling Tigers)

==== Women's tournament ====
===== Team standings =====
Final.

Team	W	L	GB
UST Growling Tigresses	5	0	-
FEU Lady Tamaraws	4	1	-
UP Lady Maroons	4	2	-
Ateneo Lady Eagles	3	2	-
De La Salle Lady Archers			-
UE Lady Warriors			-

===== Awards =====
- Most Valuable Player: Caryn Pilongo (UST Growling Tigresses)
- Rookie of the Year: Jade Zafra (UST Growling Tigresses)

=== Juniors division ===
==== Boys' tournament ====
===== Team standings =====
Final.

Team	W	L	GB
UE Red Pages	5	0	-
UST Tiger Cubs	4	1	-
Ateneo Blue Eaglets	3	2	-
FEU–D Baby Tamaraws			-
UPIS Junior Fighting Maroons			-
Zobel Junior Archers			-

===== Awards =====
- Most Valuable Player: Anthony John Samia (UE Junior Red Warriors)
- Rookie of the Year: John Resaba (UE Junior Red Warriors)

== Judo ==
The UAAP Judo Championships ran from October 4 to October 5, 2008 at the UP College of Human Kinetics Gym. For the third straight year, Judo was a demonstration sport in the boys' (junior's) division.

=== Seniors division ===
==== Men's tournament ====
===== Team standings =====
Final results:

Team	Medals				Points
Team	1st place, gold medalist(s)	2nd place, silver medalist(s)	3rd place, bronze medalist(s)	Total	Points
Ateneo	2	1	6	9	37
La Salle	3		1	4	32
UST					28
UP			7		26
Adamson					
UE					

===== Awards =====
- Most Valuable Player: Paulo Hector Luz (Ateneo Blue Eagles)
- Rookie of the Year: Alex Diaz (UP Fighting Maroons)

==== Women's tournament ====
===== Team standings =====
Final results:

Team	Medals				Points
Team	1st place, gold medalist(s)	2nd place, silver medalist(s)	3rd place, bronze medalist(s)	Total	Points
UP	5	5	0	10	75
UST					21
La Salle	1			2	14
Ateneo			4		
UE					

===== Awards =====
- Most Valuable Player: Ada Therese Estanislao (UP Lady Maroons)
- Rookie of the Year: Ada Therese Estanislao (UP Lady Maroons)

=== Juniors division ===
==== Boys' tournament ====
===== Team standings =====
Final results:

Team	Medals				Points
Team	1st place, gold medalist(s)	2nd place, silver medalist(s)	3rd place, bronze medalist(s)	Total	Points
Ateneo	5	2	1	8	62
UST					
UE	0	0	3	3	
DLSZ					

===== Awards =====
- Most Valuable Player: Ronaldo Vergel de Dios (Ateneo Blue Eaglets)
- Rookie of the Year:

== Badminton ==
UE and FEU won all of their elimination round games in the men's and women's tournaments respectively to clinch the championship outright.

=== Men's tournament ===
Team	W	L	GB
UE Red Warriors	7	0	--
UST Growling Tigers	6	1	1
De La Salle Green Archers	5	2	2
FEU Tamaraws	4	3	3
UP Fighting Maroons	3	4	4
Ateneo Blue Eagles	2	5	5
Adamson Soaring Falcons	1	6	6
NU Bulldogs	0	7	7

Awards:
- Most Valuable Player: Winston Aquilo (UE Red Warriors)
- Rookie of the Year: R-Jay Ormilla (UST Growling Tigers)
- Most Improved Player: Don Johnson Agustin (UE Red Warriors)

=== Women's tournament ===
Team	W	L	GB
FEU Lady Tamaraws	7	0	--
De La Salle Lady Archers	5	2	1
UST Growling Tigresses	5	2	2
UE Lady Warriors	5	2	3
Adamson Lady Falcons	3	4	4
UP Lady Maroons	2	5	5
Ateneo Lady Eagles	1	6	6
NU Lady Bulldogs	0	7	7

Awards
- Most Valuable Player: Racquel Guerrero (UE Lady Warriors)
- Rookie of the Year: Bianca Legaspi (UP Lady Maroons)
- Most Improved Player: Diosan Abangan (FEU Lady Tamaraws)

== Tennis ==
The UAAP Season 71 Tennis tournaments began on January 10, 2009 at the Rizal Memorial Sports Complex Tennis Courts.

=== Men's tournament ===
==== Elimination round ====
Team	W	L	GB
De La Salle Green Archers	5	1	0.5
UST Growling Tigers	5	0	--
UP Fighting Maroons	3	3	2.5
UE Red Warriors	1	5	4.5
Ateneo Blue Eagles	0	5	5

==== Awards ====
- Most Valuable Player: Glen Rodriguez (UST Growling Tigers)
- Rookie of the Year: Zoren Mendiola (UST Growling Tigers)

=== Women's tournament ===
==== Elimination round ====
Team	W	L	GB
UST Growling Tigresses	6	0	--
De La Salle Lady Archers	4	2	2
Ateneo Lady Eagles	2	4	4
UP Lady Maroons	0	6	6

== Table tennis ==
The UAAP Season 71 Table Tennis tournament began on September 20, 2008 at the Blue Eagle Gym inside the Ateneo de Manila University campus.

=== Seniors division ===
==== Men's tournament ====
Team standings

Team	W	L	GB
UST Growling Tigers	12	0	--
FEU Tamaraws	10	2	2
UP Fighting Maroons	6	6	6
De La Salle Green Archers	5	7	7
UE Red Warriors	4	8	8
Ateneo Blue Eagles	2	10	10
NU Bulldogs	0	12	12

===== Awards =====
- Most Valuable Player:
- Rookie of the Year:

==== Women's tournament ====
Team standings

Team	W	L	GB
FEU Lady Tamaraws	10	0	-
UST Growling Tigresses	8	2	2
UP Lady Maroons	6	4	4
De La Salle Lady Archers	4	6	6
Ateneo Lady Eagles	2	8	8
NU Lady Bulldogs	0	10	10

===== Awards =====
- Most Valuable Player: Beverly Villar (FEU Lady Tamaraws)
- Rookie of the Year: Princess Masong (UST Growling Tigresses)

=== Juniors' division ===
==== Boys' tournament ====
Team standings

Team	W	L	GB
UST Tiger Cubs	12	0	-
UE Red Pages	10	2	-
Ateneo Blue Eaglets	6	4	-
Adamson Baby Falcons	6	6	-
UPIS Junior Fighting Maroons	5	7	-
NUNS Bullpups	2	10	-
Zobel Junior Archers	0	10	-

===== Awards =====
- Most Valuable Player:
- Rookie of the Year:

== Swimming ==
The UAAP Season 71 Swimming Championships started on September 25, 2008 at the Trace Aquatics Centre in Los Baños, Laguna. Four titles were disputed, namely: the men's division, the women's division, the boys' division and the girls' division

Team ranking is determined by a point system, similar to that of the overall championship. The points given are based on the swimmer's/team's finish in the finals of an event, which include only the top eight finishers from the preliminaries. The gold medalist(s) receive 15 points, silver gets 12, bronze has 10. The following points: 8, 6, 4, 2 and 1 are given to the rest of the participating swimmers/teams according to their order of finish.

=== Seniors division ===
==== Men's tournament ====
===== Team standings =====
Final results:

Team	Medals				Points
Team	1st place, gold medalist(s)	2nd place, silver medalist(s)	3rd place, bronze medalist(s)	Total	Points
UST					223
La Salle					211
UP	3	6	2	11	176
Ateneo	1	7	7	15	
UE					

===== Awards =====
- Most Valuable Player: Ernest Lorenzo Dee (De La Salle Green Archers)
- Rookie of the Year: Timothy Vincent Yap (De La Salle Green Archers)

==== Women's tournament ====
===== Team standings =====
Final results:

Team	Medals				Points
Team	1st place, gold medalist(s)	2nd place, silver medalist(s)	3rd place, bronze medalist(s)	Total	Points
Ateneo	9	6	10	25	216
UP					213
UST					172
La Salle					
UE					

===== Awards =====
- Most Valuable Player: Luica Gaudes Dacanay (UP Lady Maroons)
- Rookie of the Year: Jackie Junio (UP Lady Maroons)

Pos.	Pts.
1st	15
2nd	12
3rd	10
4th	8
5th	6
6th	4
7th	2
8th	1

=== Juniors division ===
==== Boys' tournament ====
===== Team standings =====
Final results:

Team	Medals				Points
Team	1st place, gold medalist(s)	2nd place, silver medalist(s)	3rd place, bronze medalist(s)	Total	Points
Ateneo	15	13	10	38	385
UST					
La Salle					
UPIS					
UE					

===== Awards =====
- Most Valuable Player: Gian Daniel Berino (UST Tiger Cubs)
- Rookie of the Year: Gabe Castelo (Ateneo Blue Eaglets)

==== Girls' tournament ====
===== Team standings =====
Final results:

Team	Medals				Points
Team	1st place, gold medalist(s)	2nd place, silver medalist(s)	3rd place, bronze medalist(s)	Total	Points
UST					260
UE					
UPIS					
DLSZ					

===== Awards =====
- Most Valuable Player: Sabrina Ingrid Ilustre (UE Junior Lady Warriors)
- Rookie of the Year: Maria Kristina Bartolome (UST Junior Tigresses)

== Cheerdance ==
The 2008 Cheerdance Competition was held on September 7, 2008 at the Araneta Coliseum in Cubao, Quezon City. This year, the pep squads performed before a record attendance of 23,443 students, alumni and fans.

Cheer dance competition is an exhibition event. Points for the general championship are not awarded to the participants.

Rank	Pep squad	Score
1st	UP Pep Squad	93.30
2nd	UST Salinggawi Dance Troupe	85.27
3rd	FEU Cheering Squad	83.96
4th	Ateneo Blue Babble Battalion	83.81
5th	Adamson Pep Squad	81.04
6th	UE Cheering Squad	72.89
7th	DLSU Pep Squad	70.07
8th	NU Pep Squad	68.36

Stunner awardee: Frances Fleta

== General championship summary ==
The general champion is determined by a point system. The system gives 15 points to the champion team of a UAAP event, 12 to the runner-up, and 10 to the third placer. The following points: 8, 6, 4, 2 and 1 are given to the rest of the participating teams according to their order of finish.

=== Medals table ===
==== Seniors' division ====
Rank	Team	Gold	Silver	Bronze	Total
1	University of Santo Tomas	9	8	8	25
2	Far Eastern University	7	6	3	16
3	De La Salle University	3	6	4	13
4	Ateneo de Manila University	3	1	3	7
5	University of the Philippines Diliman*	2	5	6	13
6	University of the East	2	2	2	6
7	Adamson University	2	0	2	4
8	National University	0	0	0	0
Totals (8 entries)		28	28	28	84

* Host nation (Season host); General champions
Notes: Results are final.

==== Juniors' division ====
Rank	Team	Gold	Silver	Bronze	Total
1	University of Santo Tomas	3	2	2	7
2	Ateneo de Manila University	3	1	3	7
3	University of the East	2	4	0	6
4	Adamson University	1	0	0	1
5	UP Integrated School*	0	1	1	2
6	Far Eastern University–FERN College	0	1	0	1
7	De La Salle Zobel	0	0	3	3
8	National University	0	0	0	0
Totals (8 entries)		9	9	9	27

* Host nation (Season host); General champions
Notes: Results are final.

=== General championship tally ===
==== Seniors' division ====
		Basketball		Volleyball (indoor)		Volleyball (beach)		Swimming		Chess		Tennis		Table tennis		Badminton		Taekwondo		Judo		Baseball	Softball	Football		Athletics		Fencing		Total		
Rank	Team	M	W	M	W	M	W	M	W	M	W	M	W	M	W	M	W	M	W	M	W	M	W	M	W	M	W	M	W	M	W	Overall
1	UST	6	10	15	10	15	10	15	10	12	10	12	15	15	12	12	10	15	15	10	12	8	12	8	15	12	12	15	10	170	163	333
2	La Salle	12	6	10	15	7	4	12	8	8	15	15	12	8	8	10	12	4	6	12	10	4	4	10	12	4	4	6	4	122	120	242
3	UP (H)	4	12	12	2	7	1	10	12	2	8	10	8	10	10	6	4	8	10	8	15	12	8	15	6	6	6	10	12	120	114	234
4	FEU	10	15	4	12	12	15	—	—	15	12	—	—	12	15	8	15	10	12	—	—	—	—	12	10	15	15	8	6	106	127	233
5	Ateneo	15	4	8	6	1.5	2	8	15	1	4	8	10	4	6	4	2	12	8	15	6	10	6	4	8	10	8	4	8	104.5	93	197.5
6	UE	8	1	2	4	1.5	12	6	6	6	6	6	—	6	—	15	8	6	4	5	8	—	10	6	—	8	10	12	15	87.5	84	171.5
7	Adamson	2	8	6	8	10	8	—	—	10	—	—	—	—	—	2	6	—	—	5	4	15	15	—	—	—	—	—	—	50	49	99
8	NU	1	2	1	1	4	6	—	—	4	2	—	—	2	4	1	1	—	—	—	—	6	—	—	—	—	—	—	—	19	16	35

(H) Season host; = Champion; = Runner-up; = Third place; — = No team.
Notes: Results are final.

==== Juniors' division ====
		Basketball	Volleyball (indoor)		Swimming		Chess	Table tennis	Taekwondo	Athletics	Total				
Rank	Team	B	B	G	B	G	C	B	B	B	B	G	C	K	Overall
1	UST	6	10	15	12	15	4	15	12	10	65	30	4	0	99
2	UE	4	15	12	6	12	12	12	15	8	60	24	12	0	96
3	Ateneo	15	12	—	15	—	10	10	10	15	77	0	10	0	87
4	DLSZ	10	8	10	10	8	2	2	4	4	38	18	2	0	58
5	UPIS (H)	1	4	8	8	10	—	6	8	12	39	18	0	0	57
6	FEU–FERN	12	—	—	—	—	8	—	6	6	24	0	8	0	32
7	Adamson	8	—	—	—	—	15	8	—	—	16	0	15	0	31
8	NU	2	6	—	—	—	6	4	—	—	12	0	6	0	18

(H) Season host; = Champion; = Runner-up; = Third place; — = No team.
Notes: Results are final.

== Individual awards ==
- Athlete of the Year:
  - Seniors': John Paul Gomez (De La Salle Green Archers, chess)
  - Juniors': Alyssa Valdez (UST Junior Tigresses, volleyball)

== See also ==
- NCAA Season 84
