= Boom Gonzalez =

Filipino sportscaster, TV host and disc jockey

- Born: Marcelino Antonio Gonzalez; March 30, 1980 (age 46)
- Years active: 1997–present
- Title: Sportscaster, host
- Sports commentary career
- Genre: Play-by-play
- Sports: Basketball; Volleyball; Football

Marcelino Antonio "Boom" Gonzalez (born March 30, 1980) is a Filipino sportscaster, disc jockey and TV host.

== Career ==
Gonzalez started his career at PBL and coverages PBA coverages of Viva. He continued his career at NBN-IBC consortium coverage. He later joined at ABS-CBN Sports' coverage of UAAP games, and later with One Sports coverage.

He formerly hosted a sports show named Gameday. He also hosted some Manila NBA events.

He is also a radio disc jockey for Magic 89.9.
