= UAAP Season 78 basketball tournaments =

Basketball season

UAAP Season 78
- Host school: University of the Philippines Diliman
Men's Finals	G1	G2	G3	Wins
UST Growling Tigers	64	62	62	1
FEU Tamaraws	75	56	67	2
- Duration: November 25 – December 2, 2015
- Arena(s): Smart Araneta Coliseum; Mall of Asia Arena
- Finals MVP: Mac Belo
- Winning coach: Nash Racela (1st title)
- Semifinalists: Ateneo Blue Eagles; NU Bulldogs
- TV network(s): ABS-CBN, ABS-CBN HD, ABS-CBN Sports and Action, The Filipino Channel, Balls, Balls HD
Women's Finals	G1	G2	Wins
NU Lady Bulldogs	91	75	2+1
Ateneo Lady Eagles	59	55	0
- Duration: December 2–6, 2015
- Arena(s): Mall of Asia Arena; Blue Eagle Gym
- Finals MVP: Afril Bernardino
- Winning coach: Patrick Aquino (2nd title)
- Semifinalists: De La Salle Lady Archers; Ateneo Lady Eagles
Juniors' Finals	G1	G2	G3	Wins
NUNS Bullpups	78	60	96	2+1
Zobel Junior Archers	58	71	75	1
- Duration: February 19 – March 4, 2016
- Arena(s): Filoil Flying V Arena
- Finals MVP: Justine Baltazar
- Winning coach: Jeff Napa (3rd title)
- Semifinalists: Ateneo Blue Eaglets; FEU–D Baby Tamaraws
- TV network(s): ABS-CBN Sports and Action

The UAAP Season 78 basketball tournaments are held in school year 2015–16. University of the Philippines Diliman is the season host. The basketball tournaments started with a doubleheader basketball games after the opening ceremonies on September 5, 2015, at the Smart Araneta Coliseum and ended on December 2, 2015, at the Mall of Asia Arena, while the junior's basketball has currently been held since November. ABS-CBN's UHF channel ABS-CBN Sports and Action broadcast the men's tournament for the sixteenth consecutive year.

== Men's tournament ==
=== Teams ===
Team	University	Coach
Adamson Soaring Falcons	Adamson University (AdU)	(Philippines) Mike Fermin
Ateneo Blue Eagles	Ateneo de Manila University (ADMU)	(Philippines) Bo Perasol
De La Salle Green Archers	De La Salle University (DLSU)	(Philippines) Juno Sauler
FEU Tamaraws	Far Eastern University (FEU)	(Philippines) Nash Racela
NU Bulldogs	National University (NU)	(Philippines) Eric Altamirano
UE Red Warriors	University of the East (UE)	(Philippines) Derrick Pumaren
UP Fighting Maroons	University of the Philippines Diliman (UP)	(Philippines) Rensy Bajar
UST Growling Tigers	University of Santo Tomas (UST)	(Philippines) Bong dela Cruz

==== Coaching changes ====
Team	Old coach	Reason	New coach
UP	(Philippines) Rey Madrid	Fired	(Philippines) Renzy Bajar
Adamson	(Philippines) Kenneth Duremdes	Fired	(Philippines) Mike Fermin

=== Elimination round ===
==== Team standings ====
Pos	Team	W	L	PCT	GB	Qualification
1	UST Growling Tigers	11	3	.786 (Note: Head-to-head record: UST 2–0 FEU)	—	Twice-to-beat in the semifinals
2	FEU Tamaraws	11	3	.786	—	Twice-to-beat in the semifinals
3	Ateneo Blue Eagles	9	5	.643	2	Twice-to-win in the semifinals
4	NU Bulldogs	7	7	.500	4	Twice-to-win in the semifinals
5	De La Salle Green Archers	6	8	.429 (Note: Head-to-head record: La Salle 2–0 UE)	5	
6	UE Red Warriors	6	8	.429	5	
7	UP Fighting Maroons (H)	3	11	.214 (Note: Head-to-head record: UP 1–1 Adamson (UP 0, Adamson 0); overall point differential: UP –91, Adamson –128)	8	
8	Adamson Soaring Falcons	3	11	.214	8	

Source: ABS-CBN Sports
Rules for classification: 1) winning percentage; 2) if tied for #2 or #4, one-game playoff; 3) head-to-head record; 4) head-to-head point differential; 5) overall point differential
(H) Hosts

==== Match-up results ====
	Round 1							Round 2						
Team ╲ Game	1	2	3	4	5	6	7	8	9	10	11	12	13	14
Adamson	UST school colors	Ateneo school colors	UE school colors	La Salle school colors	NU school colors	FEU school colors	UP school colors	UP school colors	Ateneo school colors	NU school colors	La Salle school colors	FEU school colors	UE school colors	UST school colors
Ateneo	FEU school colors	Adamson school colors	NU school colors	UE school colors	UST school colors	UP school colors	La Salle school colors	FEU school colors	Adamson school colors	UST school colors	NU school colors	UP school colors	La Salle school colors	UE school colors
La Salle	NU school colors	UP school colors	FEU school colors	Adamson school colors	UE school colors	UST school colors	Ateneo school colors	UST school colors	UE school colors	Adamson school colors	NU school colors	Ateneo school colors	UP school colors	FEU school colors
FEU	Ateneo school colors	UST school colors	La Salle school colors	UP school colors	UE school colors	Adamson school colors	NU school colors	Ateneo school colors	UP school colors	UE school colors	Adamson school colors	UST school colors	NU school colors	La Salle school colors
NU	La Salle school colors	UE school colors	Ateneo school colors	UST school colors	Adamson school colors	UP school colors	FEU school colors	UE school colors	UST school colors	Adamson school colors	Ateneo school colors	La Salle school colors	UP school colors	FEU school colors
UE	UP school colors	NU school colors	Adamson school colors	Ateneo school colors	FEU school colors	La Salle school colors	UST school colors	NU school colors	La Salle school colors	FEU school colors	UST school colors	Adamson school colors	Ateneo school colors	UP school colors
UP	UE school colors	La Salle school colors	UST school colors	FEU school colors	NU school colors	Ateneo school colors	Adamson school colors	Adamson school colors	FEU school colors	UST school colors	Ateneo school colors	NU school colors	La Salle school colors	UE school colors
UST	Adamson school colors	FEU school colors	UP school colors	NU school colors	Ateneo school colors	La Salle school colors	UE school colors	La Salle school colors	NU school colors	Ateneo school colors	UP school colors	UE school colors	FEU school colors	Adamson school colors

= Win; = OT win; = Loss; = OT loss

==== Scores ====
Team	AdU	ADMU	DLSU	FEU	NU	UE	UP	UST
Adamson Soaring Falcons		60–84	71–88	60–64	54–75	78–89	73–68	64–70
Ateneo Blue Eagles	87–72		76–80	64–88	74–70**	77–72	56–43	58–68
De La Salle Green Archers	74–75	62–73		75–93	67–63	71–64	66–71	61–77
FEU Tamaraws	82–69	66–61	71–68		61–59	92–81	75–58	71–72
NU Bulldogs	85–79*	59–68	81–73	70–68		71–76	68–52	55–54
UE Red Warriors	71–74	74–69	64–72	67–71	52–47		55–62	76–83
UP Fighting Maroons	89–84	65–74	68–72	57–68	69–75	67–79		59–67
UST Growling Tigers	78–63	74–80	81–79	85–76	65–57	77–91	83–76	

Legend: Blue = left column team win; Red = top row team win.
Matches with lighter background shading were decided after overtime.

=== Bracket ===
Semifinals (Top 2 twice-to-beat)
1	UST	64
4	NU	55
2	FEU	76
3	Ateneo	74

Finals (Best-of-three playoff)
1	UST	64	62	62
2	FEU	75	56	67

=== Semifinals ===
In the semifinals, the higher seed has the twice-to-beat advantage, where they only have to win once, while their opponents twice, to progress.

==== (1) UST vs. (4) NU ====
The UST Growling Tigers had the twice-to-beat advantage.

ABS-CBN Sports and Action

November 22
3:30 p.m.

Boxscore

UST Growling Tigers	64–55	NU Bulldogs
Scoring by quarter: 15–12, 15–8, 14–12, 20–23
Pts: Louie Vigil 19; Rebs: Louie Vigil 10; Asts: Louie Vigil 7		Pts: Pao Javelona 17; Rebs: Alfred Aroga 15; Asts: Alolino, Alejandro 2 each
UST wins series in one game

Smart Araneta Coliseum, Quezon City

==== (2) FEU vs. (3) Ateneo ====
The FEU Tamaraws had the twice-to-beat advantage.

ABS-CBN Sports and Action

November 21
3:30 p.m.

Boxscore

FEU Tamaraws	76–74	Ateneo Blue Eagles
Scoring by quarter: 19–12, 19–20, 18–18, 20–24
Pts: Roger Pogoy 16; Rebs: Mac Belo 9 Asts: Tolomia, Ru. Escoto 2 each		Pts: Kiefer Ravena 25; Rebs: Pessumal, Ikeh 6 each Asts: Ravena, Pingoy 2 each
FEU wins series in one game

Smart Araneta Coliseum, Quezon City

=== Finals ===
This is the first Finals matchup between the FEU Tamaraws and the UST Growling Tigers in 36 years. The last time these two teams faced each other in the Finals was in UAAP Season 42. This is also, as of 2026, the last UAAP Finals series to not feature either or both Ateneo and La Salle men's basketball teams and the second consecutive season to feature two founding UAAP schools in the finals.

ABS-CBN Sports and Action

November 25
3:30 p.m.

Boxscore

UST Growling Tigers	64–75	FEU Tamaraws
Scoring by quarter: 24–28, 10–19, 17–10, 13–18
Pts: Karim Abdul 19; Rebs: Karim Abdul 9 Asts: 5 players 1 each		Pts: Roger Pogoy 15; Rebs: Mac Belo 13; Asts: Pogoy, Inigo, 3 each

Mall of Asia Arena, Pasay

ABS-CBN

November 28
3:30 p.m.

Boxscore

UST Growling Tigers	62–56	FEU Tamaraws
Scoring by quarter: 13–20, 8–10, 26–11, 15–15
Pts: Kevin Ferrer 29; Rebs: Kevin Ferrer 10; Asts: Ed Daquioag 4		Pts: Mac Belo 16; Rebs: Mac Belo 11; Asts: Mike Tolomia 6

Smart Araneta Coliseum, Quezon City
Attendance: 21,933

ABS-CBN Sports and Action

December 2
3:30 p.m.

UST Growling Tigers	62–67	FEU Tamaraws
Scoring by quarter: 19–18, 11–12, 16–21, 16–16
Pts: Ed Daquioag 21; Rebs: Louie Vigil 7 Asts: 3 players, 2 each		Pts: Mac Belo 23; Rebs: Belo, Ru. Escoto, 8 each Asts: Mike Tolomia 3
FEU wins series 2–1

Mall of Asia Arena, Pasay
Attendance: 23,124

- Finals Most Valuable Player: Mac Belo (FEU Tamaraws)

==== Broadcast notes ====
ABS-CBN Sports is the official broadcaster of the UAAP Season 78 Men's Basketball Finals. Simulcast over ABS-CBN Channel 2 and ABS-CBN HD Channel 167 (Game 2 only), ABS-CBN Sports and Action, Balls HD channel 195, The Filipino Channel. Livestream over TFC.tv, sports.abs-cbn.com and IWant TV. Replays on Balls. This is the first time in the finals of the game 2 series to broadcast in both ABS-CBN Channel 2 and ABS-CBN Sports and Action.

Game	Play-by-play	Analyst	Courtside Reporters	Upfront at the UAAP Hosts
Game 1	Boom Gonzales	TJ Manotoc	Angelique Manto and Ganiel Krishnan	Janeena Chan and Nathasha Alquiros
Game 2	TJ Manotoc	Marco Benitez	Angelique Manto and Ganiel Krishnan	No Upfront at the UAAP
Game 3	Mico Halili	TJ Manotoc	Angelique Manto and Ganiel Krishnan	Janeena Chan, Nathasha Alquiros and Bea Daez

Additional Game 2 crew:

- Awards Presenter: Nikko Ramos

Additional Game 3 crew:

- Awards Presenter: TJ Manotoc

=== Awards ===
UAAP Season 78 men's basketball champions
FEU Tamaraws
20th title

- Most Valuable Player: Kiefer Ravena (Ateneo Blue Eagles)
- Rookie of the Year: Joshua Andrei Caracut (De La Salle Green Archers)
- Mythical Team:
  - Kiefer Ravena (Ateneo Blue Eagles)
  - Jeron Teng (De La Salle Green Archers)
  - Alfred Aroga (NU Bulldogs)
  - Ed Daquioag (UST Growling Tigers)
  - Kevin Ferrer (UST Growling Tigers)

==== Sponsored awards ====
- Bear Brand Adult Plus Level Up Player: Kevin Ferrer (UST Growling Tigers)
- Jolibee Beeda ang Galing Player: Jeron Teng (De La Salle Green Archers)
- Master Gwapo Player: Kiefer Ravena (Ateneo Blue Eagles)
- Appeton Most Improved Player: Ed Daquioag (UST Growling Tigers)
- PS Bank PSBankable Player: Mac Belo (FEU Tamaraws)
- Team Bonchon of the Year: FEU Tamaraws

=== Discipline ===
- Mike Fermin of the Adamson Falcons was suspended on their game against the NU Bulldogs, last September 23, after he was ejected during their game against La Salle due to a slit-throat gesture.

== Women's tournament ==
=== Elimination round ===
==== Team standings ====
Pos	Team	W	L	PCT	GB	Qualification
1	NU Lady Bulldogs	14	0	1.000	—	Thrice-to-beat in the Finals (Note: As NU won all of their elimination round games, the stepladder format will be used instead of the regular Final Four format.)
2	De La Salle Lady Archers	12	2	.857	2	Twice-to-beat in stepladder round 2
3	UE Lady Warriors	7	7	.500	7	Proceed to stepladder round 1
4	Ateneo Lady Eagles	6	8	.429 (Note: Fourth-seed playoff: Ateneo 64–53 UST (OT))	8	Proceed to stepladder round 1
5	UST Growling Tigresses	6	8	.429	8	
6	Adamson Lady Falcons	4	10	.286 (Note: Head-to-head record: Adamson 1–1 UP (Adamson +2))	10	
7	UP Fighting Maroons (H)	4	10	.286	10	
8	FEU Lady Tamaraws	3	11	.214	11	

Source: ABS-CBN Sports
Rules for classification: 1) winning percentage; 2) if tied for #2 or #4, one-game playoff; 3) head-to-head record; 4) head-to-head point differential; 5) overall point differential
(H) Hosts

==== Match-up results ====
	Round 1							Round 2						
Team ╲ Game	1	2	3	4	5	6	7	8	9	10	11	12	13	14
Adamson	UP school colors	FEU school colors	UE school colors	NU school colors	UST school colors	La Salle school colors	Ateneo school colors	UP school colors	FEU school colors	NU school colors	La Salle school colors	UST school colors	UE school colors	Ateneo school colors
Ateneo	UE school colors	NU school colors	UP school colors	UST school colors	La Salle school colors	FEU school colors	Adamson school colors	FEU school colors	UP school colors	UST school colors	NU school colors	UE school colors	La Salle school colors	Adamson school colors
La Salle	NU school colors	UE school colors	FEU school colors	UP school colors	Ateneo school colors	Adamson school colors	UST school colors	UST school colors	UE school colors	FEU school colors	Adamson school colors	UP school colors	Ateneo school colors	NU school colors
FEU	UST school colors	Adamson school colors	La Salle school colors	UE school colors	UP school colors	Ateneo school colors	NU school colors	Ateneo school colors	Adamson school colors	La Salle school colors	UE school colors	NU school colors	UST school colors	UP school colors
NU	La Salle school colors	Ateneo school colors	UST school colors	Adamson school colors	UE school colors	UP school colors	FEU school colors	UE school colors	UST school colors	Adamson school colors	Ateneo school colors	FEU school colors	UP school colors	La Salle school colors
UE	Ateneo school colors	La Salle school colors	Adamson school colors	FEU school colors	NU school colors	UST school colors	UP school colors	NU school colors	La Salle school colors	UP school colors	FEU school colors	Ateneo school colors	Adamson school colors	UST school colors
UP	Adamson school colors	UST school colors	Ateneo school colors	La Salle school colors	FEU school colors	NU school colors	UE school colors	Adamson school colors	Ateneo school colors	UE school colors	UST school colors	La Salle school colors	NU school colors	FEU school colors
UST	FEU school colors	UP school colors	NU school colors	Ateneo school colors	Adamson school colors	UE school colors	La Salle school colors	La Salle school colors	NU school colors	Ateneo school colors	UP school colors	Adamson school colors	FEU school colors	UE school colors

= Win; = OT win; = Loss; = OT loss

==== Scores ====
Team	AdU	ADMU	DLSU	FEU	NU	UE	UP	UST
Adamson Lady Falcons		39–49	57–75	69–64*	62–76	57–49	62–53	67–70
Ateneo Lady Eagles	55–41		43–44	48–46	36–70	29–43	56–43	48–57
De La Salle Lady Archers	78–62	63–58		54–45	78–90	63–59	76–34	67–56
FEU Lady Tamaraws	48–39	51–60	43–54		43–86	38–54	46–38	58–65
NU Lady Bulldogs	75–49	70–43	81–74	71–57		66–63	80–44	71–45
UE Lady Warriors	67–43	62–66	70–73*	44–41	40–80		56–51	75–65*
UP Lady Maroons	46–39	42–41	53–78	52–54	39–87	46–45		52–58
UST Tigresses	71–75	67–53	63–70	68–53	60–85	53–68	59–61	

Legend: Blue = left column team win; Red = top row team win.
Matches with lighter background shading were decided after overtime.

=== Fourth seed playoff ===
November 18

UST Growling Tigresses	53–64 (OT)	Ateneo Lady Eagles
Scoring by quarter: 5–12, 10–19, 19–9, 16–10, Overtime: 3–14
Pts: Bettina Peñaflor 18; Rebs: Misaela Larosa 18; Asts: Candice Magdaluyo 3		Pts: Hazelle Yam 26; Rebs: Danica Jose 19; Asts: Likhang Javier 7
Ateneo enters the Final Four

Blue Eagle Gym, Quezon City

=== Bracket ===
Stepladder round 1 (Single-elimination)
3	UE	62
4	Ateneo	65

Stepladder round 2 (No. 2 twice-to-beat)
2	La Salle	53	50
4	Ateneo	55	62

Finals (No. 1 thrice-to-beat)
1	NU	91	75
4	Ateneo	59	55

=== Stepladder semifinals ===
==== (3) UE vs. (4) Ateneo ====
This is a single-elimination game.

November 22
10:00 am

UE Lady Warriors	62–65	Ateneo Lady Eagles
Scoring by quarter: 16–21, 13–14, 21–18, 12–12
Pts: Ruthlaine Tacula 17; Rebs: Eunique Chan 19; Asts: Ruthlaine Tacula 2		Pts: Jose, Yam, 17 each Rebs: Caramia Buendia 9 Asts: Danica Jose 4
Ateneo advances to the stepladder semifinals round 2

Smart Araneta Coliseum, Quezon City

==== (2) La Salle vs. (4) Ateneo ====
La Salle has the twice-to-beat advantage, where they only have to win once, while their opponents twice, to progress.

November 25
10:00 a.m.

De La Salle Lady Archers	53–55	Ateneo Lady Eagles
Scoring by quarter: 16–11, 20–14, 8–22, 9–8
Pts: Snow Peñaranda 12; Rebs: Ara Abaca 15; Asts: Ara Abaca 4		Pts: Hazelle Yam 19; Rebs: Danica Jose 19; Asts: Likhang Javier 5

Mall of Asia Arena, Pasay

November 28
10:00 a.m.

De La Salle Lady Archers	50–62	Ateneo Lady Eagles
Scoring by quarter: 12–15, 12–11, 14–12, 12–24
Pts: Camille Claro 13; Rebs: Ara Abaca 9 Asts: Abaca, Claro, 2 each		Pts: Hazelle Yam 15; Rebs: Danica Jose 11; Asts: Danica Jose 4
Ateneo win series in two games

Smart Araneta Coliseum, Quezon City

=== Finals ===
NU has to win two times, while their opponent has to win three times.

December 2
10:00 am

NU Lady Bulldogs	91–59	Ateneo Lady Eagles
Scoring by quarter: 21–10, 22–10, 22–16, 26–23
Pts: Afril Bernardino 17; Rebs: Afril Bernardino 18; Asts: Andrea Tongco 7		Pts: Katrina Guytingco 14; Rebs: Danica Jose 10; Asts: Yam, Javier, 4 each

Mall of Asia Arena, Pasay

December 6
3:30 pm

NU Lady Bulldogs	75–55	Ateneo Lady Eagles
Scoring by quarter: 10–6, 30–15, 20–13, 15–21
Pts: Afril Bernardino 18; Rebs: Afril Bernardino 17; Asts: Shelley Gupilan 7		Pts: Jolina Go 19; Rebs: Danica Jose 10; Asts: Likhang Javier 6
NU wins series in two games

Blue Eagle Gym, Quezon City

- Finals Most Valuable Player: Afril Bernardino (NU Lady Bulldogs)

=== Awards ===
UAAP Season 78 women's basketball champions
NU Lady Bulldogs
Second title, second consecutive title

- Most Valuable Player: Afril Bernardino (NU Lady Bulldogs)
- Rookie of the Year: Jack Danielle Animam (NU Lady Bulldogs)
- Mythical Team:
  - Danica Therese Jose (Ateneo Lady Eagles)
  - Ara Abaca (De La Salle Lady Archers)
  - Afril Bernardino (NU Lady Bulldogs)
  - Cherry Ano-os (UE Lady Warriors)
  - Maica Cortes (UST Growling Tigresses)

== Juniors' tournament ==
=== Elimination round ===
==== Team standings ====
Pos	Team	W	L	PCT	GB	Qualification
1	NUNS Bullpups	14	0	1.000	—	Thrice-to-beat in the Finals (Note: As NU won all of their elimination round games, the stepladder format will be used instead of the regular Final Four format.)
2	Zobel Junior Archers	11	3	.786	3	Twice-to-beat in stepladder round 2
3	Ateneo Blue Eaglets	10	4	.714	4	Proceed to stepladder round 1
4	FEU–D Baby Tamaraws	8	6	.571	6	Proceed to stepladder round 1
5	Adamson Baby Falcons	7	7	.500	7	
6	UPIS Junior Fighting Maroons (H)	3	11	.214 (Note: Head-to-head record: UP 1–1 UST (UP +13))	11	
7	UST Tiger Cubs	3	11	.214	11	
8	UE Junior Red Warriors	0	14	.000	14	

Source: ABS-CBN Sports
Rules for classification: 1) winning percentage; 2) if tied for #2 or #4, one-game playoff; 3) head-to-head record; 4) head-to-head point differential; 5) overall point differential
(H) Hosts

==== Match-up results ====
	Round 1							Round 2						
Team ╲ Game	1	2	3	4	5	6	7	8	9	10	11	12	13	14
Adamson	NU school colors	UE school colors	Ateneo school colors	FEU school colors	UST school colors	UP school colors	La Salle school colors	UP school colors	NU school colors	UE school colors	FEU school colors	Ateneo school colors	La Salle school colors	UST school colors
Ateneo	La Salle school colors	FEU school colors	Adamson school colors	UST school colors	UP school colors	UE school colors	NU school colors	NU school colors	UP school colors	La Salle school colors	UE school colors	Adamson school colors	UST school colors	FEU school colors
DLSZ	Ateneo school colors	UP school colors	NU school colors	UE school colors	FEU school colors	UST school colors	Adamson school colors	FEU school colors	UST school colors	Ateneo school colors	UP school colors	UE school colors	Adamson school colors	NU school colors
FEU	UP school colors	Ateneo school colors	UE school colors	Adamson school colors	La Salle school colors	NU school colors	UST school colors	La Salle school colors	UE school colors	NU school colors	Adamson school colors	UST school colors	UP school colors	Ateneo school colors
NSNU	Adamson school colors	UST school colors	La Salle school colors	UP school colors	UE school colors	FEU school colors	Ateneo school colors	Ateneo school colors	Adamson school colors	FEU school colors	UST school colors	UP school colors	UE school colors	La Salle school colors
UE	UST school colors	Adamson school colors	FEU school colors	La Salle school colors	NU school colors	Ateneo school colors	UP school colors	UST school colors	FEU school colors	Adamson school colors	Ateneo school colors	La Salle school colors	NU school colors	UP school colors
UPIS	FEU school colors	La Salle school colors	UST school colors	NU school colors	Ateneo school colors	Adamson school colors	UE school colors	Adamson school colors	Ateneo school colors	UST school colors	La Salle school colors	NU school colors	FEU school colors	UE school colors
UST	UE school colors	NU school colors	UP school colors	Ateneo school colors	Adamson school colors	La Salle school colors	FEU school colors	UE school colors	La Salle school colors	UP school colors	NU school colors	FEU school colors	Ateneo school colors	Adamson school colors

= Win; = OT win; = Win by forfeit; = Loss; = OT loss; = Loss by forfeit

==== Scores ====
Team	AdU	ADMU	DLSZ	FEU	NSNU	UE	UPIS	UST
Adamson Baby Falcons		55–71	79–66	49–51	55–61	83–52	76–65	76–45
Ateneo Blue Eaglets	82–73		71–84	85–66	60–73	91–51	74–67	79–56
Zobel Junior Archers	47–35	80–73		67–55	53–68	107–79	72–61	96–43
FEU-FERN Baby Tamaraws	60–55	53–78	58–78		56–70	–	58–52	61–40
NSNU Bullpups	68–66	81–69	80–57	67–53		89–33	77–65	80–54
UE Junior Warriors	26–80	58–96	64–110	79–93	60–94		69–104	73–77
UP Junior Maroons	61–66	67–75	74–85	71–81	54–70	99–79		0–2 (Note: Loss by default)
UST Tiger Cubs	63–77	57–80	52–78	66–86	58–82	95–94	71–82	

Legend: Blue = left column team win; Red = top row team win.
Matches with lighter background shading were decided after overtime.

=== Bracket ===
Stepladder round 1 (Single-elimination)
3	Ateneo	84
4	FEU–Diliman	68

Stepladder round 2 (No. 2 twice-to-beat)
2	DLSZ	75
3	Ateneo	68

Finals (No. 1 thrice-to-beat)
1	NSNU	78	60	96
2	DLSZ	58	71	75

=== Stepladder semifinals ===
==== (3) Ateneo vs. (4) FEU Diliman ====
February 10, 2016
4:00 p.m.

Report 1

Ateneo Blue Eaglets	84–68	FEU–D Baby Tamaraws
Scoring by quarter: 20–14, 15–14, 28–19, 21–21
Pts: SJ Belangel 15; Rebs: Justin Eustaquio 9 Asts: SJ Belangel 8		Pts: Kenji Roman 21; Rebs: Kenji Roman 13; Asts: Gloria, Gonzales, 4 each
Ateneo advances to the stepladder semifinals round 2

Filoil Flying V Arena

==== (2) DLSZ vs. (3) Ateneo ====
In the semifinals, La Salle has the twice-to-beat advantage, where they only have to win once, while their opponents twice, to progress.

February 15, 2016
4:00 p.m.

Zobel Junior Archers	75–68	Ateneo Blue Eaglets
Scoring by quarter: 15–12, 15–16, 24–14, 21–26
Pts: Brent Paraiso 15; Rebs: Brent Paraiso 13; Asts: Miguel Fortuna 5		Pts: Mamuyac, Andrade, 16 each Rebs: Shaun Ildefonso 18; Asts: Sam Belangel 4
La Salle wins series in one game

Filoil Flying V Arena

=== Finals ===
NU has to win two times, while their opponent has to win three times. The finals series will be aired on ABS-CBN Sports and Action Channel 23 and HD Channel 166.

ABS-CBN Sports and Action

February 19
2:00 p.m.

NUNS Bullpups	78–58	Zobel Junior Archers
Scoring by quarter: 22–13, 18–9, 22–17, 16–19
Pts: John Lloyd Clemente 16; Rebs: Justine Baltazar 27; Asts: Paul Manalang 4		Pts: Aljun Melecio 15; Rebs: Marco Sario 8 Asts: Aljun Melecio 6

Filoil Flying V Arena

ABS-CBN Sports and Action

February 26
2:00 p.m.

NUNS Bullpups	60–71	Zobel Junior Archers
Scoring by quarter: 17–14, 13–16, 21–27, 9–14
Pts: John Lloyd Clemente 25; Rebs: Justine Baltazar 20; Asts: Atienza, Manalang, 4 each		Pts: Marco Sario 16; Rebs: MR Romero 10; Asts: Aljun Melecio 9

Filoil Flying V Arena

ABS-CBN Sports and Action

March 4
2:00 p.m.

NUNS Bullpups	96–75	Zobel Junior Archers
Scoring by quarter: 22–9, 26–28, 31–15, 17–23
Pts: Winderlich Coyoca 20; Rebs: John Lloyd Clemente 15; Asts: 3 players, 4 each		Pts: Aljun Melecio 22; Rebs: MR Romero 8 Asts: Aljun Melecio 6
NU wins series in three games

Filoil Flying V Arena

- Finals Most Valuable Player: Justine Baltazar (NUNS Bullpups)

=== Awards ===
UAAP Season 78 juniors' basketball champions
NUNS Bullpups
Sixth title

- Most Valuable Player: Aljun Melecio (Zobel Junior Archers)
- Rookie of the Year: Carl Tamayo (Adamson Baby Falcons)
- Mythical Five:
  - Aljun Melecio (Zobel Junior Archers)
  - Justine Baltazar (NUNS Bullpups)
  - John Lloyd Clemente (NUNS Bullpups)
  - Javi Gómez de Liaño (UPIS Junior Fighting Maroons)
  - Juan Gómez de Liaño (UPIS Junior Fighting Maroons)

== Overall Championship points ==
=== Seniors' division ===
Team	Men	Women	Total
NU Bulldogs	8	15	23
Ateneo Blue Eagles	10	12	22
UST Growling Tigers	12	6	18
De La Salle Green Archers	6	10	16
FEU Tamaraws	15	1	16
UE Red Warriors	4	8	12
Adamson Soaring Falcons	1	4	5
UP Fighting Maroons	2	2	4

Pts.	Ranking
15	Champion
12	2nd
10	3rd
8	4th
6	5th
4	6th
2	7th
1	8th
—	Did not join
WD	Withdrew

In case of a tie, the team with the higher position in any tournament is ranked higher. If both are still tied, they are listed by alphabetical order.

How rankings are determined:

- Ranks 5th to 8th determined by elimination round standings.
- Loser of the #1 vs #4 semifinal match-up is ranked 4th
- Loser of the #2 vs #3 semifinal match-up is ranked 3rd
- Loser of the finals is ranked 2nd
- Champion is ranked 1st

== See also ==
- NCAA Season 91 basketball tournaments

Preceded by Season 77 (2014)	UAAP basketball seasons Season 78 (2015)	Succeeded by Season 79 (2016)
