= 2015 UST Growling Tigers basketball team =

2015 UST Growling Tigers men's basketball

UAAP Season 78 runner-up

Record
- Elims rank: #1
- Final rank: #2
- 2015 record: 13–5 (11–3 elims)
- Head coach: Bong dela Cruz (2nd season)
- Assistant coaches: Rene Baena; Senen Dueñas
- Captain: Kevin Ferrer (5th season)

The 2015 UST Growling Tigers men's basketball team represented University of Santo Tomas in the 78th season of the University Athletic Association of the Philippines. The men's basketball tournament for the school year 2015-16 began on September 5, 2015 and the host school for the season was the University of the Philippines.

UST made it back to the playoffs after getting eliminated in Season 77. They finished the double round-robin eliminations at first place with 11 wins against 3 losses. The FEU Tamaraws had the same win–loss record but were ranked lower on an inferior -10 quotient. The last time that the Tigers got the top seed was in 1995 when they won their third straight championship. It was also the last time that they won as many as 11 games at the end of eliminations in a season.

They had a twice-to-beat advantage over their Final Four opponent and defending champions, the NU Bulldogs who they defeated in one game to advance to the Finals against FEU. NU has been the Tigers' semifinal opponent for the third time in the last four years. UST became the fifth team in UAAP history to reach the Finals after missing the Final Four playoffs in the previous season.

In Game Two of the Finals series, Kevin Ferrer's 24 points in the third quarter broke the UAAP record for most points scored in a period. He tied his career-high of 29 points in their 62–56 win over FEU to extend the series to a deciding Game Three. In that game, UST was also able to limit the Tamaraws to their lowest scoring output, as they have not scored lower than 60 points in the season. FEU won the series in three games, ending a decade-long wait to claim their 20th men's basketball championship. The Tigers who had faced FEU in the Finals for the first time since 1979 won both games against them in the elimination rounds.

UST recorded the most three point shots made in the season with 89 for a league-best 31% field goal percentage. They also held the highest free throw conversion of 68.4% among all teams.

Graduating players Ferrer and Ed Daquioag were included in the Mythical team selection during the presentation of awards. Ferrer was chosen back-to-back Player of the Week by the UAAP Press Corps for the duration of September 23–27 and on the week of September 30-October 4, while Daquioag received the citation for the period of September 9–13.

== Roster ==
UST Growling Tigers roster
Players
Coaches

Pos.	No.	Nat.	Name	Height	Year	High School
SG	5	(Philippines)	Janus Kyle Christian Suarez (injured)	6'2" (1.88m)	2nd	Ateneo de Manila
PG	6	(Canada)	Sheak Jamil Sheriff, Jr.	5'9" (1.75m)	4th	Loyola Catholic Secondary School
PF	7	(Philippines)	Kevin Ferrer (C)	6'4" (1.93m)	5th	University of Santo Tomas
SG	8	(Philippines)	Eduardo Daquioag, Jr.	6'1" (1.85m)	5th	RTU Laboratory High School
SG	9	(Philippines)	Dean Marvin Lee	5'8" (1.73m)	1st	Far Eastern University–Diliman
PG	10	(Philippines)	Osama Said Abdurasad	5'10" (1.78m)	1st	Kaunlaran High School
C	11	(Philippines)	Enrique Caunan, Jr.	6'5" (1.96m)	1st	Colegio de San Juan de Letran
PG	12	(Philippines)	Janrey Garrido	5'6" (1.68m)	2nd	Hope Christian High School
SF	13	(Philippines)	Zachary Lance Eden Huang	6'4" (1.93m)	1st	Sacred Heart School–Ateneo de Cebu
SF	14	(Philippines)	Mario Emmanuel Bonleon, Jr.	6'3" (1.91m)	1st	La Salle Greenhills
C	15	(Philippines)	Jeepy Faundo	6'6" (1.98m)	3rd	José Rizal University
PF	16	(Philippines)	Justin Arana	6'5" (1.96m)	1st	Basud National High School
PG	17	(Philippines)	Henri Lorenzo Subido (injured)	5'9" (1.75m)	2nd	De La Salle Santiago Zobel School
SF	18	(Philippines)	Louie Philippe Vigil	6'3" (1.91m)	4th	José Rizal University
PF	19	(Philippines)	Kent Jefferson Lao	6'4" (1.93m)	4th	Saint Stephen's High School
C	20	(Cameroon)	Karim Abdul	6'6" (1.98m)	5th	Sta. Clara International Academy

Head coach

- (Philippines) Segundo dela Cruz, III

Assistant coach(es)

- Renaldo Baena
- Senen Dueñas
- Alvin Patrimonio
- Ma. Genevieve Francisco

Strength & conditioning coach(es)

- Emmanuel Calipes
- Kris Anthony Agarao

Team manager

- Kenneth Causon
- Eduardo Villanueva, Jr.

Legend

- (C) Team captain
- Injured

- Roster

=== Depth chart ===
Pos.	Starting 5	Bench 1	Bench 2	Bench 3
C	Abdul	Faundo	Caunan
PF	Ferrer	Lao	Arana
SF	Vigil	Bonleon	Huang
SG	Daquioag	Lee	Suarez
PG	Sheriff	Subido	Garrido	Abdurasad

== Roster changes ==
=== Subtractions ===
Pos.	No.	Nat.	Player	Height	Year	High school	Notes
SF	5	(Philippines)	Kim Kaizen Lo	6' 1"	5th	St. Jude Catholic School	Graduated
PG	9	(Philippines)	Levi dela Cruz, II	5' 7"	2nd	Nazareth School of National University	Transferred to Jose Maria College
SF	10	(Philippines)	Aljon Mariano	6' 3"	5th	San Beda College–Rizal	Graduated
SF	11	(Philippines)	Regie Boy Basibas	6' 3"	2nd	Arellano University High School	Out due to groin injury
PF	12	(Philippines)	Jon Cornelius Macasaet	6' 3"	3rd	San Sebastian College-Recoletos	Out due to ACL injury
C	13	(Philippines)	Paulo Lorenzo Pe	6' 4"	5th	Ateneo de Manila	Graduated
PF	14	(Philippines)	Raymart Angelo Sablan	6' 4"	2nd	UP Integrated School	Transferred to University of the Philippines
SF	16	(Philippines)	Alfren Gayosa	6' 2"	2nd	San Sebastian College-Recoletos	Transferred to San Sebastian College-Recoletos

=== Additions ===
Pos.	No.	Nat.	Player	Height	Year	High school	Notes
SG	5	(Philippines)	Janus Kyle Christian Suarez	6' 2"	2nd	Ateneo de Manila	Transferred from University of the Philippines
SG	9	(Philippines)	Dean Marvin Lee	5' 8"	1st	Far Eastern University–Diliman	Rookie
PG	10	(Philippines)	Osama Said Abdurasad	5' 10"	1st	Kaunlaran High School	Rookie
C	11	(Philippines)	Enrique Caunan, Jr.	6' 5"	1st	Colegio de San Juan de Letran	Rookie
PG	12	(Philippines)	Janrey Garrido	5' 6"	2nd	Hope Christian High School	Returning from Season 75
SF	13	(Philippines)	Zachary Lance Eden Huang	6' 4"	1st	Sacred Heart School–Ateneo de Cebu	Rookie
SF	14	(Philippines)	Mario Emmanuel Bonleon, Jr.	6' 3"	1st	La Salle Greenhills	Promoted from Team B
PF	16	(Philippines)	Justin Arana	6' 5"	1st	Basud National High School	Rookie

=== Recruiting class ===
Name	Pos.	Height	High school	Hometown	Commit date
Mario Bonleon	SF	6' 3"	La Salle Greenhills	Davao City	10 Jul 2013
Mario Bonleon	2013 National Basketball Training Center Top 30 player				
Marvin Lee	SG	5' 8"	Far Eastern University–Diliman	Antipolo	25 Apr 2015
Marvin Lee	2015 National Basketball Training Center Top 30 player				
Zachary Huang	SF	6' 4"	Sacred Heart School–Ateneo de Cebu	Cebu City	9 Mar 2015
Zachary Huang	2015 NBTC rank: N/A (Division 1 champion)				
Sources: 12345

== Coaching staff ==
Estong Ballesteros, the Growling Tigers' assistant coach for offense and trainer has resigned from his post. He had informed head coach Bong dela Cruz of his decision to concentrate on coaching the Philippine National Police basketball team in the MBL and as deputy to Lawrence Chongson at Tanduay in the PBA D-League.

Rene Baena was hired to replace Ballesteros. The veteran coach who was a member of UST's track and field team was an assistant coach of the Adamson Baby Falcons juniors' basketball team. He has coached the juniors teams of La Salle Greenhills, Ateneo U13, and the San Beda Red Cubs in the past. He has also served as an assistant coach of the UE Red Warriors team that made it to the UAAP Finals in 2009.

Four-time Philippine Basketball Association MVP Alvin Patrimonio has also come on board as consultant and trainer of the team's big men.

== Injuries ==
Forwards Joco Macaseat and Regie Boy Basibas were excluded from the roster with both suffering from year-long injuries. Macasaet tore his ACL while lifting weights in the offseason, while Basibas had some issues with his groin.

Karim Abdul, Louie Vigil, and Kyle Suarez also fell to various injures in the summer, but all three were able to play in the UAAP. Abdul underwent surgery on his left knee in April to have his bone spurs removed. Vigil failed to suit for the Tigers in the Filoil Flying V tournament as he got sidelined by a hamstring injury, and while Suarez was able to play after recovering from an ACL injury in December, he reinjured it during a game against the De La Salle Green Archers in the first round.

Mario Bonleon and Renzo Subido also missed games during the season. Bonleon hurt his finger during practice and was not able to play against the Adamson Falcons in the first round, while Subido also had an ACL injury before their Finals series with FEU.

== Schedule and results ==
=== Preseason tournaments ===
Preseason game log

2015 Filoil Flying V Hanes Premier Cup: 4–4
Game	Date • Time	Opponent	Result	Record	High points	High rebounds	High assists	Location
1	Apr 25 • 2:00 pm	UE Red Warriors	L 59–60	0–1	Bonleon (17)			Filoil Flying V Arena; San Juan
2	Apr 29 • 5:00 pm	Mapúa Cardinals	W 78–59	1–1	Bonleon (22)			Filoil Flying V Arena; San Juan
3	May 2 • 5:00 pm	San Beda Red Lions	L 64–74	1–2	Daquioag (29)			Filoil Flying V Arena; San Juan
4	May 20 • 3:15 pm	UP Fighting Maroons	W 76–72	2–2	Ferrer (19)			Filoil Flying V Arena; San Juan
5	May 23 • 3:15 pm	CEU Scorpions	L 77–82	2–3	Daquioag (34)			Filoil Flying V Arena; San Juan
6	May 27 • 11:45 am	Lyceum Pirates	W 72–66	3–3	Daquioag (16)			Filoil Flying V Arena; San Juan
7	Jun 3 • 1:30 pm	SWU Cobras	W 66–59	4–3	Daquioag (22)			Filoil Flying V Arena; San Juan
8	Jun 6 • 5:00 pm	De La Salle Green Archers	L 82–84	4–4	Daquioag (20)			Filoil Flying V Arena; San Juan

21st Fr. Martin Cup Summer basketball tournament: 5–2
Game	Date • Time	Opponent	Result	Record	High points	High rebounds	High assists	Location
1 (Note: Jasper Magno was a member of the Team B training pool)	May 18	Letran Knights	W 84–82^{OT}	1–0	Magno (26)			St. Placid Gym; Manila
2	May 19	JRU Heavy Bombers	L 66–93	1–1				St. Placid Gym; Manila
3	May 26	NU Bulldogs	W 70–55	2–1	Bonleon (17)			St. Placid Gym; Manila
4	Jun 2	Enderun Colleges Titans	W 75–72	3–1	Sheriff (13)			St. Placid Gym; Manila
5	Jun 8	Arellano Chiefs; Quarterfinal round	W 73–68	4–1				Arellano Gym; Manila
6	Jun 15	San Beda Red Lions; Semifinal round	W 75–72	5–1	Lao (22)			Arellano Gym; Manila
7	Jun 17	JRU Heavy Bonbers; Championship game	L 65–73	5–2	Tied (18)			Arellano Gym; Manila

(#) Tournament seedings in parentheses.
All times are in UTC+08:00.

=== UAAP games ===
Elimination games were played in a double round-robin format. All games were aired on ABS-CBN Sports and Action and Balls. The second game of the Finals series was aired on ABS-CBN and Balls.

UAAP Season 78 game log

Elimination round: 11–3
Game	Date • Time	Opponent	Result	Record	High points	High rebounds	High assists	Location
1	Sep 5 • 4:00 pm	Adamson Soaring Falcons	W 70–64	1–0	Daquioag (28)	Ferrer (8)	Ferrer (4)	Smart Araneta Coliseum; Quezon City
2	Sep 9 • 4:00 pm	FEU Tamaraws	W 72–71	2–0	Daquioag (18)	Ferrer (8)	Sheriff (3)	Smart Araneta Coliseum; Quezon City
3	Sep 13 • 2:00 pm	UP Fighting Maroons	W 67–59	3–0	Daquioag (27)	Ferrer (10)	Sheriff (2)	Mall of Asia Arena; Pasay
4	Sep 19 • 4:00 pm	NU Bulldogs	L 54–55	3–1	Ferrer (14)	Ferrer (11)	Tied (3)	Mall of Asia Arena; Pasay
5	Sep 26 • 4:00 pm	Ateneo Blue Eagles	W 68–58	4–1	Ferrer (27)	Abdul (11)	Daquioag (3)	Mall of Asia Arena; Pasay
6	Sep 30 • 4:00 pm	De La Salle Green Archers	W 77–61	5–1	Ferrer (27)	Abdul (13)	Sheriff (5)	Mall of Asia Arena; Pasay
7	Oct 7 • 2:00 pm	UE Red Warriors; End of R1 of eliminations	W 83–76	6–1	Daquioag (34)	Abdul (10)	Daquioag (6)	Smart Araneta Coliseum; Quezon City
8	Oct 12 • 4:00 pm	De La Salle Green Archers	W 81–79	7–1	Abdul (18)	Tied (11)	Ferrer (2)	Smart Araneta Coliseum; Quezon City
9	Oct 17 • 4:00 pm	NU Bulldogs	W 62–57	8–1	Tied (13)	Ferrer (10)	Vigil (3)	Mall of Asia Arena; Pasay
10	Oct 21 • 4:00 pm	Ateneo Blue Eagles	L 74–80	8–2	Daquioag (19)	Tied (9)	Daquioag (3)	Smart Araneta Coliseum; Quezon City
11	Oct 25 • 4:00 pm	UP Fighting Maroons	W 83–76	9–2	Ferrer (29)	Ferrer (14)	Vigil (6)	Mall of Asia Arena; Pasay
12	Nov 4 • 2:00 pm	UE Red Warriors	L 77–91	9–3	Abdul (25)	Abdul (15)	Daquioag (6)	Smart Araneta Coliseum; Quezon City
13	Nov 7 • 4:00 pm	FEU Tamaraws	W 85–76	10–3	Abdul (23)	Vigil (7)	Abdul (3)	Smart Araneta Coliseum; Quezon City
14	Nov 11 • 2:00 pm	Adamson Soaring Falcons; End of R2 of eliminations	W 78–63	11–3	Ferrer (25)	Ferrer (10)	Tied (4)	Smart Araneta Coliseum; Quezon City

Final Four: 2–0
Game	Date • Time	Seed	Opponent	Result	Series	High points	High rebounds	High assists	Location
1	Nov 22 • 3:30 pm	(#1)	(#4) NU Bulldogs	W 64–55	1–0 (12–3)	Vigil (19)	Vigil (10)	Vigil (7)	Smart Araneta Coliseum; Quezon City

Finals: 1–2
Game	Date • Time	Seed	Opponent	Result	Series	High points	High rebounds	High assists	Location
1	Nov 25 • 3:30 pm	(#1)	(#2) FEU Tamaraws	L 64–75	0–1 (12–4)	Abdul (19)	Abdul (9)	Tied (1)	Mall of Asia Arena; Pasay
2	Nov 28 • 3:30 pm	(#1)	(#2) FEU Tamaraws	W 62–56	1–1 (13–4)	Ferrer (29)	Ferrer (10)	Daquioag (4)	Smart Araneta Coliseum; Quezon City
3	Dec 2 • 3:30 pm	(#1)	(#2) FEU Tamaraws	L 62–67	1–2 (13–5)	Daquioag (21)	Vigil (7)	Tied (2)	Mall of Asia Arena; Pasay

(#) Tournament seedings in parentheses.
All times are in UTC+08:00.
Source: HumbleBola

=== Postseason tournament ===
The Philippine Collegiate Champions League games were aired on ABS-CBN Sports and Action.

Postseason game log

2015 PCCL National Collegiate Championship: 0–1
Game	Date • Time	Opponent	Result	Record	High points	High rebounds	High assists	Location
1	Dec 15 • 4:00 pm	USC Warriors; Elite Eight knockout stepladder rounds	L 72–82	0–1	Daquioag (17)			Filoil Flying V Arena, San Juan

(#) Tournament seedings in parentheses.
All times are in UTC+08:00.

== UAAP statistics ==
=== Eliminations ===
Player	GP	GS	MPG	FGM	FGA	FG%	3PM	3PA	3P%	FTM	FTA	FT%	RPG	APG	SPG	BPG	TOV	PPG
Kevin Ferrer	14	14	31.5	71	177	40.1	32	92	34.8	77	99	77.8	8.2	1.6	0.9	0.4	2.2	17.9
Ed Daquioag	14	14	34.5	89	211	42.2	7	41	17.1	45	66	68.2	5.6	2.2	1.1	0.8	3.4	16.4
Karim Abdul	14	14	29.4	59	136	43.4	2	5	40.0	57	86	66.3	8.4	1.2	0.5	1.2	2.4	12.6
Louie Vigil	14	8	24.1	49	115	42.6	11	42	26.2	21	35	60.0	4.8	2.5	0.4	0.4	2.1	9.3
Marvin Lee	14	2	19.8	25	62	40.3	14	37	37.8	23	29	79.3	2.9	0.6	1.1	0.0	1.6	6.2
Mario Bonleon	13	6	16.6	23	58	39.7	8	23	34.8	4	7	57.1	2.4	0.8	0.0	0.2	1.8	4.5
Kent Lao	14	2	17.1	15	51	29.4	11	34	32.4	6	9	66.7	2.9	0.4	0.1	0.1	0.6	3.4
Jon Sheriff	14	10	17.2	11	44	25.0	0	0	0.0	10	25	40.0	2.4	2.1	0.6	0.0	0.7	2.3
Kyle Suarez	6	0	14.3	3	5	66.0	3	3	100.0	0	0	0.0	0.3	0.2	0.0	0.0	0.5	1.5
Renzo Subido	12	0	5.9	2	13	15.4	1	9	11.1	3	4	75.0	0.4	0.8	0.1	0.0	0.5	0.7
Jeepy Faundo	10	0	3.1	1	1	100.0	0	0	0.0	3	4	75.0	0.6	0.0	0.1	0.2	0.0	0.5
Zach Huang	6	0	2.3	0	1	0.0	0	0	0.0	0	0	0.0	0.3	0.0	0.0	0.0	0.2	0.0
Justin Arana	2	0	1.2	0	0	0.0	0	0	0.0	0	0	0.0	0.0	0.0	0.0	0.0	0.0	0.0
Janrey Garrido	6	0	0.8	0	2	0.0	0	1	0.0	0	0	0.0	0.2	0.0	0.0	0.0	0.3	0.0
Enric Caunan	4	0	0.6	0	1	0.0	0	0	0.0	0	0	0.0	0.0	0.0	0.0	0.0	0.0	0.0
Ama Abdurasad	4	0	0.5	0	0	0.0	0	0	0.0	0	0	0.0	0.0	0.0	0.0	0.0	0.0	0.0
Total	14		40.0	348	877	39.7	89	287	31.0	249	364	68.4	40.6	11.9	4.9	3.2	16.4	73.9
Opponents	14		40.0	345	908	38.0	78	299	26.1	198	307	64.5	44.1	13.1	3.4	3.1	18.7	69.0

=== Playoffs ===
Player	GP	GS	MPG	FGM	FGA	FG%	3PM	3PA	3P%	FTM	FTA	FT%	RPG	APG	SPG	BPG	TOV	PPG
Kevin Ferrer	4	4	34.8	22	59	37.3	9	30	30.0	8	15	53.3	6.3	1.3	0.5	1.0	1.8	15.3
Karim Abdul	4	4	31.2	14	40	35.0	0	0	0.0	20	29	69.0	7.3	1.0	0.0	1.3	3.0	12.0
Ed Daquioag	4	4	32.9	15	46	32.6	1	9	11.1	12	16	75.0	5.8	2.0	1.0	1.0	3.5	10.8
Louie Vigil	4	4	28.7	16	50	32.0	2	16	12.5	4	7	57.1	6.3	2.5	1.0	0.5	1.0	9.5
Marvin Lee	4	0	17.6	6	16	37.5	3	13	23.1	7	9	77.8	2.3	1.3	0.0	0.0	1.3	5.5
Mario Bonleon	4	0	16.4	7	14	50.0	2	7	28.6	0	0	0.0	2.0	0.0	0.0	0.0	0.5	4.0
Jon Sheriff	4	3	15.0	6	11	54.5	0	0	0.0	4	12	33.3	3.0	0.5	0.5	0.0	0.8	4.0
Kent Lao	4	1	18.0	2	14	14.3	1	10	10.0	3	4	75.0	1.5	0.0	0.3	0.0	0.3	2.0
Zach Huang	2	0	4.4	0	0	0.0	0	0	0.0	0	0	0.0	0.5	0.0	0.5	0.0	0.0	0.0
Jeepy Faundo	4	0	3.2	0	0	0.0	0	0	0.0	0	2	0.0	1.5	0.0	0.0	0.0	0.3	0.0
Total	4		40.0	88	250	35.2	18	85	21.2	58	94	61.7	39.0	8.5	3.5	3.8	12.5	63.0
Opponents	4		40.0	83	259	32.0	18	90	20.0	69	97	71.1	50.8	10.0	2.0	3.3	17.3	63.3

Legend
GP	Games played	GS	Games started	MPG	Minutes per game
FGM	Field-goal made	FGA	Field-goal attempts	FG%	Field-goal percentage
3PM	3-point field-goal made	3PA	3-point field-goal attempts	3P%	3-point field-goal percentage
FTM	Free-throw made	FTA	Free-throw attempts	FT%	Free-throw percentage
RPG	Rebounds per game	APG	Assists per game	SPG	Steals per game
BPG	Blocks per game	TOV	Turnovers per game	PPG	Points per game

Source: HumbleBola

== Awards ==
Name	Award	Date	Ref.
Team	Fr. Martin Cup runner-up trophy	17 Jun 2015	
Team	UAAP runner-up trophy	2 Dec 2015	
Ed Daquioag	Mythical team	28 Nov 2015	
Ed Daquioag	Appeton Most Improved Player	28 Nov 2015	
Ed Daquioag	Player of the Week	9–13 Sep 2015	
Kevin Ferrer	Mythical team	28 Nov 2015	
Kevin Ferrer	Bear Brand Adult Plus Level Up Player	28 Nov 2015	
Kevin Ferrer	Player of the Week	23–27 Sep 2015	
Kevin Ferrer	Player of the Week	30 Sep–4 Oct 2015	

== Players drafted into the PBA ==
Kevin Ferrer and Ed Daquioag, both members of the Gilas national team training pool applied for the 2016 PBA draft and were selected through a special draft separate from the regular rookie applicants on October 30, 2016.

Ferrer was selected by the Tim Cone-led Barangay Ginebra San Miguel team as the second pick, while Daquioag ended up with the Norman Black-coached Meralco Bolts for the special draft's sixth overall pick.

Year	Round	Pick	Overall	Player	PBA team
2016	Special draft for Gilas players	2	2	Kevin Ferrer	Barangay Ginebra San Miguel
2016	Special draft for Gilas players	6	6	Ed Daquioag	Meralco Bolts
