= Kevin Ferrer =

Filipino basketball player (born 1993)

No. 77 – TNT Tropang 5G
- Position: Small forward / power forward
- League: PBA

Personal information
- Born: March 26, 1993 (age 33) Makati, Philippines
- Listed height: 6 ft 5 in (1.96 m)
- Listed weight: 200 lb (91 kg)

Career information
- High school: UST (Manila)
- College: UST
- PBA draft: 2016: Special draft
- Drafted by: Barangay Ginebra San Miguel
- Playing career: 2016–present

Career history
- 2016–2019: Barangay Ginebra San Miguel
- 2019–2022: NorthPort Batang Pier
- 2023–2025: Terrafirma Dyip
- 2025–present: TNT Tropang 5G

Career highlights
- 2× PBA champion (2017 Governors', 2018 Commissioner's); PBA All-Star (2017); PBA All-Rookie Team (2017); PCCL champion (2012); UAAP Mythical Five (2015)

Kevin Manuel Ferrer (born March 26, 1993) is a Filipino professional basketball player for the TNT Tropang 5G of the Philippine Basketball Association (PBA).

== High school career ==
Ferrer played for the Tiger Cubs from 2009 up to 2010.

In his rookie season with the Tiger Cubs, Ferrer was crowned the Junior's Rookie of the Year. Ferrer along with season MVP Ron Javier led the Tigers into a second-place finish at the end of the eliminations. Unfortunately, the Tiger Cubs were eliminated by the Kiefer Ravena-led Ateneo Blue Eaglets squad in the Final Four despite having a twice-to-beat advantage against the Eaglets.

In his final season with the Tiger Cubs, Ferrer was crowned the Junior's Most Valuable Player where he led the Tiger Cubs into the Finals where they faced off once again with Ravena and the Blue Eaglets who finished the elimination round undefeated at 14–0 with an automatic Finals berth and a 1–0 advantage in a virtual best-of-5 final series. In Game 1, Ferrer led the Tiger Cubs with 35 points as the Tiger Cubs took Game 1 77–71 to even up the series 1-1, but the Tiger Cubs lost the next two games 66–76, 59–76 and the series as the Blue Eaglets pull off a three-peat in the Junior's division of the UAAP.

== College career ==
=== Rookie season ===
Despite offers from different universities, Ferrer stayed with his alma mater and suited up for the Tigers in 2011. In his rookie season, Ferrer averaged 7.6 points per game, 5.2 rebounds per game and 1.2 assists per game. Stepping up in the second round of eliminations together with veterans Jeric Teng, Jeric Fortuna, Chris Camus and fellow rookie Karim Abdul, Ferrer and the Tigers finished the season in 4th place with an 8–6 record and returned to the Final Four. In their Final Four, Ferrer once again faced off against Kiefer Ravena and the Ateneo Blue Eagles, this time in the senior's division. Ferrer scored 10 points, but his efforts came up short as the Tigers were knocked out by the Blue Eagles to advance to the Finals 66–69.

=== Second season ===
In his second season with the Tigers, Ferrer led the Tigers back to the UAAP Finals in the Final Four with a season-high 17 points as the Tigers defeat the NU Bulldogs to advance to the UAAP Finals 63–57. The Tigers were able to advance to the UAAP Finals and faced off against the Ateneo Blue Eagles but were swept in the Finals 2–0 as the Blue Eagles completed their five-peat. Ferrer finished his sophomore campaign averaging 6.4 points per game, 4.5 rebounds per game and 1.2 assists per game.

In the Philippine Collegiate Champions League later that year, Ferrer would play a key part in the Tigers run in the tournament as they first won the Metro Manila-Luzon tournament by defeating both the Letran Knights and the Adamson Soaring Falcons to enter into the PCCL Final Four with the Ateneo Blue Eagles, San Beda Red Lions and the Southwestern U Cobras. The Tigers would finish with a 2–1 record in the Final Four to set up a rematch with the Blue Eagles in the Finals, where the Tigers exacted their revenge against the Eagles as they were crowned the National Champions after winning the title in a tightly contested three-game series.

=== Third season ===
In his third season with the Tigers, Ferrer would continue his role as the primary wing defender for the Tigers clamping down on defense over top scoring options on opposing teams. Ferrer though struggled with his offense throughout the season. However, he would break out of his slump in the Final Four against the top-seeded NU Bulldogs where he led the Tigers in scoring in both games while clamping down on defense against Bulldogs star Ray Ray Parks as the Tigers made history by becoming the first #4 seeded team to knock out a #1 seed in the UAAP Final Four to advance to the UAAP Finals for the second straight season. In Game 1 of the UAAP Finals against the De La Salle Green Archers, Ferrer would once again top the scoring for the Tigers as they escaped with a 73–72 win to go up 1–0 in the series. However, Ferrer would struggle in the next two games as the Archers recovered to win their first UAAP title since 2007. Ferrer improved his numbers during the season averaging 12.2 points per game, 7.4 rebounds per game and 1.9 assists per game on 46% shooting from the field and 70% shooting from the free throw line.

=== Fourth season and injury ===
In his fourth season with the Tigers, with new head coach Bong dela Cruz taking the helm from Pido Jarencio. Ferrer played the first eight games of the season giving them a 4–4 record and their chances of returning the Final Four still in play. However, Ferrer suffered a fracture on his left hand in practice which caused him to miss the rest of the season as the Tigers missed the Final Four for the year. Ferrer had career lows in his offensive he production as he only averaged 9.6 points per game and shot 24% from the field and 17% from 3-point range. He also averaged 5.3 rebounds per game, 1.3 assists per game and 1 steal per game.

=== Final season ===
Ferrer was able to carry his team to the finals but lost to the FEU Tamaraws. In Game 2 he placed 6 three-pointers in which the Tigers were able to force Game 3.

== Professional career ==
=== Mighty Sports ===
In 2016, Ferrer joined the Mighty Sports team of the Pilipinas Commercial Basketball League.

=== Barangay Ginebra San Miguel ===
Ferrer was drafted in the second round of the 2016 PBA draft by Ginebra. He was given a three-year max contract. In his first PBA game, he had just 3 points and 3 rebounds in 11 minutes. In their Game 2 of their Philippine Cup semis against the Star Hotshots, he scored a PBA career-high 25 points on 5-of-11 shooting from three, and 10-of-20 overall, but Ginebra still lost that game. The team eventually made it to the Finals, where they lost to the San Miguel Beermen in five games. He was also named an All-Star for that year. In Game 4 of their Governors' Cup semis against the TNT Katropa, he was shoved in the neck to the ground by TnT import Glen Rice Jr., who also threw the ball at him. Rice was ejected from the game. Ginebra eventually made it to the Finals, where they defeated the Meralco Bolts and won the championship.

Ferrer won one more championship in the 2018 Commissioner's Cup. In 2019, he was traded to the NorthPort Batang Pier.

=== NorthPort Batang Pier ===
Ferrer, along with Sol Mercado and Jervy Cruz, were traded for star guard Stanley Pringle. The trade also reunited him with his former coach in college, Pido Jarencio. In his debut for the Batang Pier, he scored 23 points to rout the Blackwater Elite. A foot injury kept him out of the playoffs for the 2019 Governors' Cup.

In 2020, he injured his foot against the Phoenix Super LPG Fuel Masters. In a rematch against them the following year, he scored 10 of his 20 points in the fourth quarter and grabbed nine rebounds off the bench as NorthPort won over Phoenix.

On January 27, 2022, Ferrer signed a two-year maximum contract extension with the Batang Pier.

=== Terrafirma Dyip ===
On January 12, 2023, Ferrer was traded to the Terrafirma Dyip for Joshua Munzon.

In a preseason game against TNT, he suffered an Achilles injury, which caused him to be out for at least the 2023–24 PBA Commissioner's Cup. While recovering from injury, he signed a one-year contract extension with the team on February 1, 2024.

=== TNT Tropang 5G ===
On September 8, 2025, the TNT Tropang 5G announced that Ferrer has been signed to a one-year deal.

== Career statistics ==
=== PBA ===
Legend
GP	Games played	MPG	Minutes per game	FG%	Field-goal percentage
3FG%	3-point field-goal percentage	4P%	4-point field-goal percentage	FT%	Free-throw percentage
RPG	Rebounds per game	APG	Assists per game	SPG	Steals per game
BPG	Blocks per game	PPG	Points per game	127	Career high

As of the end of 2024–25 season

==== Season-by-season averages ====
Year	Team	GP	MPG	FG%	3P%	4P%	FT%	RPG	APG	SPG	BPG	PPG
2016–17	Barangay Ginebra	58	17.9	.366	.278	—	.694	2.7	1.0	.3	.4	5.4
2017–18	Barangay Ginebra	56	17.6	.419	.339	—	.612	2.6	1.5	.5	.2	5.3
2019	Barangay Ginebra	40	22.7	.398	.350	—	.736	3.7	1.6	.6	.3	8.1
2019	NorthPort	40	22.7	.398	.350	—	.736	3.7	1.6	.6	.3	8.1
2020	NorthPort	10	28.5	.381	.375	—	.389	4.4	2.2	.5	.3	10.8
2021	NorthPort	22	22.5	.335	.271	—	.667	3.9	1.2	.5	.4	6.9
2022–23	NorthPort	31	21.8	.414	.342	—	.659	2.2	.9	.6	.2	8.5
2022–23	Terrafirma	31	21.8	.414	.342	—	.659	2.2	.9	.6	.2	8.5
2024–25	Terrafirma	29	22.5	.352	.302	.250	.714	2.4	1.2	.8	.3	9.0
Career		246	20.5	.384	.321	.250	.668	2.9	1.3	.5	.3	7.0

=== College ===
==== Elimination rounds ====
Year	Team	GP	MPG	FG%	3P%	FT%	RPG	APG	SPG	BPG	PPG
2011–12	UST	14	26.9	.270	.179	.667	5.4	1.3	.4	.1	7.6
2012–13	UST	10	20.9	.302	.244	.474	4.6	1.2	.5	.6	5.1
2013–14	UST	14	30.4	.339	.127	.689	8.1	2.1	.7	1.0	11.9
2014–15	UST	8	28.2	.242	.174	.806	5.3	1.4	1.0	.3	9.6
2015–16	UST	14	31.5	.401	.348	.778	8.2	1.6	.9	.4	17.9
Career		60	27.5	.325	.226	.716	6.4	1.5	.7	.5	10.0

==== Playoffs ====
Year	Team	GP	MPG	FG%	3P%	FT%	RPG	APG	SPG	BPG	PPG
2013–14	UST	5	30.6	.354	.406	.720	5.6	1.2	1.0	.4	13.0
2015–16	UST	4	34.8	.373	.300	.533	6.3	1.3	.5	1.0	15.3
Career		9	32.4	.364	.355	.650	5.9	1.2	.8	.7	14.0

== National team career ==
Ferrer first played for the Philippine national team in 2009, for the FIBA Asia U16 Championship. In 2013, he represented the country in the FIBA Asia 3x3 championships. He has also won multiple medals in basketball in the SEA Games.

In the 2017 edition of the Jones Cup, Ferrer used a crossover to get by Iraqi defender Hussein Talib. Talib got his ankle injured on that play and had to be carried out of the court by his Iraqi teammates. The play went viral, and was covered by Bleacher Report and by Yahoo Sports.

== Personal life ==
Ferrer is married to MM Belarmino, whom he met while he was still in college. He has a younger brother, Vince Jansel. His cousin, Bismarck Lina, is also a basketball player set to play for the San Beda Red Lions.
