= Queeny Sabobo =

Filipino softball player

Queeny T. Sabobo is a Filipina softball player (as short stop and outfielder). Born and raised in Negros Occidental, Sabodo was part of the Adamson University Falcons women's softball team who swept 5 championships and a 73-game winning run in the UAAP softball tournament.

Sabodo was awarded Rookie of the Year on her first season, and became Season's and Finals MVP during her final year in the UAAP. She was also awarded the Most Home Runs, Most Runs Batted In, and Best Slugger awards in the same tournament.

She represented the country in the 2015 Southeast Asian Games where they won a gold medal in women's softball.

Recently, Sabodo was awarded as co-Athlete of the Year of the UAAP Season 78, alongside Alyssa Valdez and Jessie Lacuna of Ateneo and Ian Lariba of La Salle.
