= Ed Daquioag =

Filipino basketball player (born 1991)

Free agent
- Position: Shooting guard / point guard

Personal information
- Born: August 18, 1991 (age 35) Dingras, Ilocos Norte, Philippines
- Listed height: 6 ft 1 in (1.85 m)
- Listed weight: 170 lb (77 kg)

Career information
- High school: Benedictine International School (Quezon City); RTU (Mandaluyong)
- College: UST
- PBA draft: 2016: Special draft
- Drafted by: Meralco Bolts
- Playing career: 2016–present

Career history
- 2016–2017: Meralco Bolts
- 2017–2019: Rain or Shine Elasto Painters
- 2020–2021: Blackwater Elite / Blackwater Bossing
- 2021–2024: Terrafirma Dyip
- 2024: Pangasinan Heatwaves
- 2024: Nueva Ecija Rice Vanguards
- 2025: Parañaque Patriots
- 2026: Marikina Shoemasters

Career highlights
- PBA All-Star (2017); PBA D-League Aspirant's Cup champion (2016)

Eduardo Damo Daquioag Jr. (born August 18, 1991) is a Filipino professional basketball player who last played for the Marikina Shoemasters of the Maharlika Pilipinas Basketball League (MPBL). He was picked by the Meralco Bolts in the special draft of the 2016 PBA draft. He also played collegiate basketball with the UST Growling Tigers.

== Early life and career ==
Eduardo Daquioag was born in Dingras, Ilocos Norte to a carpenter and housewife. He was scouted by UST Growling Tigers head coach, Pido Jarencio during his third year in high school while he was playing for the Ilocos Norte College of Arts and Trades at the Ilocos Regional Athletic Association. Jarencio was originally scouting Jeoff Javillonar but later was convinced to recruit Daquioag too along with Javillonar when they both finish high school.

== High school career ==
UST assistant coach Beaujing Acot, brought Daquioag and Javillonar to the Benedictine International School where Acot was head coach of the school's basketball team. Daquioag won various titles with Benedictine International School including the 2008 National Students Basketball Championship in Cebu where he was named among the Mythical Five. When the school's basketball program was dissolved in 2009, Daquioag moved to Rizal Technological University where he played under the institution's junior team which was now headed by Acot.

== College career ==
Eric Altamirano convinced Daquioag to study at the National University where the mentor was then newly appointed as the school's basketball head coach. Daquioag was unable to secure a slot at the NU Bulldogs and tried out to play for the UST Growling Tigers instead.

He made his debut for UST at the UAAP against the University of the East where his performance was well received. However his performance on the following games were lackluster and was benched in the following games. In his second year he was diagnosed with rheumatic fever, a potentially fatal disease and was forced to play limited minutes with the UST Growling Tigers on his second year. He returned to the team on his third year as a rotation player, and on his fourth year was named as a candidate for the MVP honor.

== Professional career ==
=== PBA D-League ===
Daquioag was tapped to play with the Phoenix Petroleum Accelerators at the 2016 PBA D-League Aspirant's Cup. His team won the championship beating Café France-CEU Bakers in the final.

=== PBA ===
Daquioag was selected by the Meralco Bolts in the 2016 PBA draft.

On August 7, 2017, he was traded to the Rain or Shine Elasto Painters for Mike Tolomia.

On January 14, 2020, he was traded to the TNT KaTropa for three draft picks. On February 28, before appearing in a game for TNT, he was traded to the Blackwater Elite in a three-team deal involving TNT, Blackwater, and NLEX.

On December 24, 2021, he was traded to the Terrafirma Dyip for Justin Melton.

During the 2022 Philippine Cup, he broke his right fibula, causing him to be out for the remainder of the conference.

On January 13, 2023, he signed a one-year contract extension with Terrafirma. He made his return during the 2023 Governors' Cup.

== Career statistics ==
Legend
GP	Games played	MPG	Minutes per game
FG%	Field-goal percentage	3P%	3-point field-goal percentage	FT%	Free-throw percentage
RPG	Rebounds per game	APG	Assists per game	SPG	Steals per game
BPG	Blocks per game	PPG	Points per game	**Bold**	Career high

As of the end of 2023–24 season

=== PBA season-by-season averages ===
Year	Team	GP	MPG	FG%	3P%	FT%	RPG	APG	SPG	BPG	PPG
2016–17	Meralco	32	11.8	**.465**	**.333**	.750	1.8	1.1	.5	.0	5.3
2016–17	Rain or Shine	32	11.8	**.465**	**.333**	.750	1.8	1.1	.5	.0	5.3
2017–18	Rain or Shine	41	20.5	.404	.323	.692	2.3	1.5	.8	.1	8.7
2019	Rain or Shine	**46**	20.4	.396	.298	.653	2.3	1.7	.8	.2	7.6
2020	Blackwater	10	**27.6**	.343	.227	.564	**3.7**	**3.5**	.7	**.3**	**10.2**
2021	Blackwater	23	23.1	.356	.260	.766	**3.7**	2.4	**1.1**	**.3**	8.0
2021	Terrafirma	23	23.1	.356	.260	.766	**3.7**	2.4	**1.1**	**.3**	8.0
2022–23	Terrafirma	12	14.4	.318	.320	.533	1.5	1.8	.6	.1	3.7
2023–24	Terrafirma	9	6.0	.450	.182	**1.000**	.6	.2	.3	—	2.3
Career		173	18.5	.393	.293	.682	2.3	1.7	.7	.2	7.1

=== College ===
==== Elimination rounds ====
Year	Team	GP	MPG	FG%	3P%	FT%	RPG	APG	SPG	BPG	PPG
2010-11	UST	**14**	9.2	.400	.235	.500	1.4	.9	.6	-	2.7
2012-13	UST	11	4.4	.235	.222	**1.000**	.5	.2	.2	-	1.0
2013-14	UST	**14**	24.4	**.433**	**.243**	.615	4.5	**2.5**	.6	.4	8.8
2014-15	UST	12	22.5	.352	.211	.737	2.6	1.5	**1.3**	.4	7.2
2015-16	UST	**14**	**34.5**	.422	.171	.682	**5.6**	2.2	1.1	**.8**	**16.4**
Career		65	19.5	.401	.211	.657	3.0	1.5	.8	.3	7.5

==== Playoffs ====
Year	Team	GP	MPG	FG%	3P%	FT%	RPG	APG	SPG	BPG	PPG
2013-14	UST	**4**	12.8	.286	.000	**1.000**	1.0	1.3	.0	.3	2.3
2015-16	UST	**4**	**32.9**	**.326**	**.111**	.750	**5.8**	**2.0**	**1.0**	**1.0**	**10.8**
Career		8	22.8	.317	.071	.765	3.4	1.6	.5	.6	6.5

== International career ==
While at the RTU, Daquioag was named into the Philippine national youth team led by head coach Eric Altamirano. He was also part of the amateur-laden senior Philippine national team that participated at the 2016 FIBA Asia Challenge.
