= UAAP Season 78 =

University athletic year

- "Tumitindig, Sumusulong" (transl. Standing up, Progressing)
- Host school: University of the Philippines

Overall
- Seniors: De La Salle University
- Juniors: University of Santo Tomas

Seniors' champions
Sport		Men	Women
Basketball		FEU	NU
Volleyball		Ateneo	La Salle
Beach volleyball		Ateneo	La Salle
Football		UP	UP
Baseball		La Salle	N/A
Softball		N/A	Adamson
Fencing		UE	UE
Swimming		Ateneo	Ateneo
Badminton		NU	UP
Chess		NU	La Salle
Judo		Ateneo	UST
Table tennis		La Salle	La Salle
Tennis		NU	NU
Track and field		FEU	UST
Taekwondo		UST	UE
- Poomsae: UST (Coed)
- Cheerdance: NU (Ex - Coed)
- Street dance: UP (Ex - Coed)

Juniors' champions
Sport		Boys	Girls
Basketball		NU	N/A
Volleyball		NU	NU
Football		FEU	N/A
Baseball		Ateneo	N/A
Fencing		UE	UE
Swimming		Ateneo	UST
Chess		FEU	N/A
Judo		UST	UST (DS)
Table tennis		La Salle	La Salle
Track and field		UE	UE
Taekwondo		UE	N/A
- (NT) = No tournament; (DS) = Demonstration Sport; (Ex) = Exhibition;

UAAP Season 78 was the 2015–2016 athletic year of the University Athletic Association of the Philippines (UAAP). It opened on September 5, 2015, almost two months after the usual July opening of the league during previous seasons, due to the shift in the academic calendars of four member universities, i.e. Ateneo, La Salle, UP and UST. It was hosted by the University of the Philippines.

The eight-member universities of the UAAP competed in fifteen sports to vie for the general championship title.

== Opening ceremony ==
The opening ceremonies of the UAAP Season 78 was held last September 5, 2015 at the Smart Araneta Coliseum. "Philippine Archipelago" was the theme for the opening. A festive dance number featuring the rich history of the country and the eight vintas, consisting of eight universities of the UAAP, was performed by UP Dance & Performance groups including UP Streetdance Club, UP Dance Company, UP Dancesport Society, UP Filipiniana Dance Group, ROTC Symphonic Band, Tugma and the UP Pep Squad.

It was well attended with high officials from the UAAP Board and ABS-CBN Sports present. The host's (UP) President Alfredo Pascual and UP Diliman Chancellor Michael Tan formally opened the season. This was followed with the parade of athletes and the awarding presentation of the UAAP Season 77 general championship trophies.

A basketball double header to start off the 1st elimination round, UP vs. UE at 2p.m. and Adamson vs. UST at 4p.m. followed after the opening ceremonies.

The following day at the Mall of Asia Arena, La Salle faced reigning champion NU and FEU battled Ateneo, while Women's Basketball festivities started on the same day at the Blue Eagle Gym.

A Press conference was also held at Gateway Cubao, few days before the opening.

== Sports calendar ==
=== First semester ===
Sport/Division	Event host	Date	Venue
Volleyball (Juniors)	Adamson	August 29 - October 22, 2015	Adamson University Gym
Basketball (Men)	UP	September 5 - December 2, 2015	SM Mall of Asia Arena, Smart Araneta Coliseum
Basketball (Women)	UP	September 6 - December 6, 2015	Ateneo Blue Eagle Gym
Badminton (Seniors)	FEU	September 19, 2015 – October 17, 2015	Rizal Memorial Badminton Hall
Cheerdance	Special Events Committee	October 3, 2015	SM Mall of Asia Arena
Beach Volleyball (Seniors)	UST	October 9–21, 2015	Sands at SM By The Bay, SM Mall of Asia
Taekwondo (M/W/B)	Ateneo	October 13–14 and 23, 2015	Ateneo Blue Eagle Gym, Filoil Flying V Arena
Poomsae (M/W/B)	Ateneo	October 21, 2015	Ateneo Blue Eagle Gym, Filoil Flying V Arena
Table Tennis (M/W/B)	UE	October 17–18 and 24-25, 2015	Ninoy Aquino Stadium
Swimming (Seniors/Juniors)	NU	October 23–25, 2015	Rizal Memorial Swimming Pool
Basketball (Boys)	FEU	November 14, 2015 - February 2016	Ateneo Blue Eagle Gym, Filoil Flying V Arena
Judo (Seniors/Juniors)	La Salle	November 18–19, 2015	La Salle Greenhills Gym
Football (Boys)	Ateneo	December 5, 2015 - February 7, 2016	Ateneo de Manila University Moro Lorenzo Field

=== Second semester ===
Sport/Division	Event host	Date	Venue
Baseball (M/B), Softball (W)	La Salle	Boys - January 9, 2016; Men's - February 4, 2016 - April 2016; Women's - January 30, 2016	Rizal Memorial Baseball Stadium
Volleyball (Seniors)	UP	January 30, 2016	Filoil Flying V Arena, Smart Araneta Coliseum, Mall of Asia Arena, Philsports Arena
Football (Seniors)	Ateneo	February 7 - May 2016	Moro Lorenzo Field, McKinley Hill Stadium, Rizal Memorial Football Stadium (postseason only)
Chess (Seniors/B)	Adamson	February 7 - March 2016	Henry Sy Sr.Hall in DLSU, Taft Ave, Manila.
Fencing (Seniors/Juniors)	FEU	February 10–13, 2016	Ateneo Blue Eagle Gym
Lawn Tennis (Seniors)	UST	January 30, 2016 - March 2016	Rizal Memorial Tennis Center
Track and Field (Seniors/Boys)	NU	2nd week of February - March 2016	ULTRA Track Oval
Streetdance	Special Events Committee	April 9, 2016	SM Mall of Asia Arena

== Basketball ==
The UAAP Season 78 seniors' division basketball tournament began on September 5, 2015. The tournament host was the University of the Philippines and the tournament commissioner was Rene "Rebo" Saguisag, Jr together with his deputies Romy Guevarra, Joe Lipa and Bai Cristobal. Referees from BRASCU will be hired for officiating. UAAP adopts FIBA rules on technicals, timeouts, among others.

The UAAP Season 78 juniors division basketball tournament started on November 14, 2015. The tournament venue was at the Ateneo Blue Eagle Gym. FEU was the tournament host. The Ateneo Blue Eaglets were the defending champions.

At the end of the tournament, the FEU Tamaraws won the Men's Basketball title in a best-of-three game finals series against the UST Growling Tigers which ended on December 2, 2015.

=== Seniors' division ===
==== Men's tournament ====
===== Elimination round =====
====== Team standings ======
Pos	Team	W	L	PCT	GB	Qualification
1	UST Growling Tigers	11	3	.786 (Note: Head-to-head record: UST 2–0 FEU)	—	Twice-to-beat in the semifinals
2	FEU Tamaraws	11	3	.786	—	Twice-to-beat in the semifinals
3	Ateneo Blue Eagles	9	5	.643	2	Twice-to-win in the semifinals
4	NU Bulldogs	7	7	.500	4	Twice-to-win in the semifinals
5	De La Salle Green Archers	6	8	.429 (Note: Head-to-head record: La Salle 2–0 UE)	5	
6	UE Red Warriors	6	8	.429	5	
7	UP Fighting Maroons (H)	3	11	.214 (Note: Head-to-head record: UP 1–1 Adamson (UP 0, Adamson 0); overall point differential: UP –91, Adamson –128)	8	
8	Adamson Soaring Falcons	3	11	.214	8	

Source: ABS-CBN Sports
Rules for classification: 1) winning percentage; 2) if tied for #2 or #4, one-game playoff; 3) head-to-head record; 4) head-to-head point differential; 5) overall point differential
(H) Hosts

===== Playoffs =====
Semifinals (Top 2 twice-to-beat)
1	UST	64
4	NU	55
2	FEU	76
3	Ateneo	74

Finals (Best-of-three playoff)
1	UST	64	62	62
2	FEU	75	56	67

===== Awards =====
- Season Most Valuable Player: Kiefer Ravena (Ateneo Blue Eagles)
- Finals Most Valuable Player: Mac Belo (FEU Tamaraws)
- Rookie of the Year: Joshua Andrei Caracut (De La Salle Green Archers)

==== Women's tournament ====
===== Elimination round =====
====== Team standings ======
Pos	Team	W	L	PCT	GB	Qualification
1	NU Lady Bulldogs	14	0	1.000	—	Thrice-to-beat in the Finals (Note: As NU won all of their elimination round games, the stepladder format will be used instead of the regular Final Four format.)
2	De La Salle Lady Archers	12	2	.857	2	Twice-to-beat in stepladder round 2
3	UE Lady Warriors	7	7	.500	7	Proceed to stepladder round 1
4	Ateneo Lady Eagles	6	8	.429 (Note: Fourth-seed playoff: Ateneo 64–53 UST (OT))	8	Proceed to stepladder round 1
5	UST Growling Tigresses	6	8	.429	8	
6	Adamson Lady Falcons	4	10	.286 (Note: Head-to-head record: Adamson 1–1 UP (Adamson +2))	10	
7	UP Fighting Maroons (H)	4	10	.286	10	
8	FEU Lady Tamaraws	3	11	.214	11	

Source: ABS-CBN Sports
Rules for classification: 1) winning percentage; 2) if tied for #2 or #4, one-game playoff; 3) head-to-head record; 4) head-to-head point differential; 5) overall point differential
(H) Hosts

===== Playoffs =====
Stepladder round 1 (Single-elimination)
3	UE	62
4	Ateneo	65

Stepladder round 2 (No. 2 twice-to-beat)
2	La Salle	53	50
4	Ateneo	55	62

Finals (No. 1 thrice-to-beat)
1	NU	91	75
4	Ateneo	59	55

===== Awards =====
- Most Valuable Player: Afril Bernardino (NU Lady Bulldogs)
- Rookie of the Year: Jack Danielle Animam (NU Lady Bulldogs)

=== Juniors' division ===
==== Boys' tournament ====
===== Elimination round =====
====== Team standings ======
Pos	Team	W	L	PCT	GB	Qualification
1	NUNS Bullpups	14	0	1.000	—	Thrice-to-beat in the Finals (Note: As NU won all of their elimination round games, the stepladder format will be used instead of the regular Final Four format.)
2	Zobel Junior Archers	11	3	.786	3	Twice-to-beat in stepladder round 2
3	Ateneo Blue Eaglets	10	4	.714	4	Proceed to stepladder round 1
4	FEU–D Baby Tamaraws	8	6	.571	6	Proceed to stepladder round 1
5	Adamson Baby Falcons	7	7	.500	7	
6	UPIS Junior Fighting Maroons (H)	3	11	.214 (Note: Head-to-head record: UP 1–1 UST (UP +13))	11	
7	UST Tiger Cubs	3	11	.214	11	
8	UE Junior Red Warriors	0	14	.000	14	

Source: ABS-CBN Sports
Rules for classification: 1) winning percentage; 2) if tied for #2 or #4, one-game playoff; 3) head-to-head record; 4) head-to-head point differential; 5) overall point differential
(H) Hosts

===== Playoffs =====
Stepladder round 1 (Single-elimination)
3	Ateneo	84
4	FEU–Diliman	68

Stepladder round 2 (No. 2 twice-to-beat)
2	DLSZ	75
3	Ateneo	68

Finals (No. 1 thrice-to-beat)
1	NSNU	78	60	96
2	DLSZ	58	71	75

===== Awards =====
- Most Valuable Player: Aljun Jay Melecio (Zobel Junior Archers)
- Rookie of the Year: Carl Tamayo (Adamson Baby Falcons)

== Volleyball ==
=== Seniors' division ===
The UAAP Season 78 seniors' division volleyball tournament started on January 31, 2016. The tournament main venue is the Filoil Flying V Arena in San Juan City while selected games will be played at the Smart Araneta Coliseum in Cubao, Quezon City, the Philsports Arena in Pasig, and the Mall of Asia Arena in Pasay. The tournament host is the University of the Philippines. Noreen Go is the tournament commissioner while the Deputy Commissioner and Asst. Deputy Commissioner are Sherwin Malonzo and Ivan Isada, respectively. Referees from the Philippine Volleyball Federation (PVF) headed by Nestor Bello will be used for the tournament's officiating purposes.

==== Men's tournament ====
===== Elimination round =====
====== Team standings ======
Pos	Team	Pld	W	L	Pts	SW	SL	SR	SPW	SPL	SPR	Qualification
1	Ateneo Blue Eagles	14	13	1	38	41	9	4.556	1203	975	1.234	Twice-to-beat in the semifinals
2	NU Bulldogs	14	10	4	29	32	17	1.882	1154	1085	1.064	Twice-to-beat in the semifinals
3	Adamson Soaring Falcons	14	9	5	24	29	26	1.115	1241	1220	1.017	Twice-to-win in the semifinals
4	UP Fighting Maroons (H)	14	8	6	24	28	25	1.120	1187	1179	1.007	Twice-to-win in the semifinals
5	FEU Tamaraws	14	7	7	23	28	25	1.120	1126	1206	0.934	
6	De La Salle Green Archers	14	5	9	16	24	32	0.750	1228	1259	0.975	
7	UST Growling Tigers	14	4	10	13	19	30	0.633	1090	1124	0.970	
8	UE Red Warriors	14	0	14	1	5	42	0.119	910	1159	0.785	

Source: ABS-CBN Sports
Rules for classification: 1) number of wins; 2) if tied for #2 or #4, one-game playoff; 3) match points; 4) sets ratio; 5) points ratio; 6) head-to-head record
(H) Host

====== Playoffs ======
Semifinals (Nos. 1 & 2 have twice-to-beat advantage)
1	Ateneo	3
4	UP	0
2	NU	1	3
3	Adamson	3	1

Finals (Best-of-three series)
1	Ateneo	3	3
2	NU	1	0

===== Awards =====
- Season Most Valuable Player: Marck Jesus Espejo (Ateneo Blue Eagles)
- Finals Most Valuable Player: Ysrael Wilson Marasigan (Ateneo Blue Eagles)
- Rookie of the Year: James Martin Natividad (NU Bulldogs)

==== Women's tournament ====
===== Elimination round =====
====== Team standings ======
Pos	Team	Pld	W	L	Pts	SW	SL	SR	SPW	SPL	SPR	Qualification
1	Ateneo Lady Eagles	14	12	2	35	37	9	4.111	1094	858	1.275	Twice-to-beat in the semifinals
2	De La Salle Lady Archers	14	11	3	33	36	14	2.571	1163	910	1.278	Twice-to-beat in the semifinals
3	FEU Lady Tamaraws	14	9	5	27	31	24	1.292	1200	1181	1.016	Twice-to-win in the semifinals
4	UP Lady Maroons (H)	14	8	6	25	29	22	1.318	1151	1133	1.016	Twice-to-win in the semifinals
5	NU Lady Bulldogs	14	7	7	22	26	25	1.040	1099	1065	1.032	
6	UST Growling Tigresses	14	5	9	15	24	31	0.774	1150	1209	0.951	
7	Adamson Lady Falcons	14	3	11	8	14	37	0.378	1042	1199	0.869	
8	UE Lady Warriors	14	1	13	3	4	39	0.103	718	1062	0.676	

Source: ABS-CBN Sports
Rules for classification: 1) number of wins; 2) if tied for #2 or #4, one-game playoff; 3) match points; 4) sets ratio; 5) points ratio; 6) head-to-head record
(H) Host

====== Playoffs ======
Semifinals (Nos. 1 & 2 have twice-to-beat advantage)
1	Ateneo	3
4	UP	0
2	La Salle	2	3
3	FEU	3	0

Finals (Best-of-three series)
1	Ateneo	0	3	1
2	La Salle	3	2	3

===== Awards =====
- Season Most Valuable Player: Alyssa Valdez (Ateneo Lady Eagles)
- Finals Most Valuable Player: Kim Kianna Dy (De La Salle Lady Archers)
- Rookie of the Year: Isa Molde (UP Lady Maroons)

=== Juniors' division ===
The UAAP Season 78 Juniors volleyball tournament will start on August 22, 2015. The tournament venue will be at the Adamson University Gym in San Marcelino St., Ermita, Manila. Adamson is the tournament host. The number of participating schools in the boys' and girls' tournaments both increased to seven. Far Eastern University fielded boys' and girls' volleyball teams beginning season 77. Since there are now seven participating schools, the tournaments will have a Final Four format. The UAAP Board decided to move the high school volleyball tournaments from 2nd semester to 1st semester due to the basketball juniors tournament being moved from the 1st semester to 2nd semester.

==== Boys' tournament ====
===== Elimination round =====
Pos	Team	Pld	W	L	PCT	GB	Qualification
1	NUNS Bullpups	12	12	0	1.000	—	Advance to the Finals
2	UE Junior Red Warriors	12	10	2	.833	2	Twice-to-beat in stepladder round 2
3	FEU–D Baby Tamaraws	12	8	4	.667	4	Stepladder round 1
4	Ateneo Blue Eaglets	12	5	7	.417 (Note: Fourth-seed playoff: Ateneo wins over UST)	7	Stepladder round 1
5	UST Tiger Cubs	12	5	7	.417	7	Fourth-seed playoff
6	Zobel Junior Archers	12	2	10	.167	10	
7	UPIS Junior Fighting Maroons (H)	12	0	12	.000	12	

Source: ABS-CBN Sports
Rules for classification: 1) winning percentage; 2) if tied for #2 or #4, one-game playoff; 3) head-to-head record; 4) head-to-head point differential; 5) overall point differential
(H) Hosts

===== Awards =====
- Most Valuable Player: Shaun Ledesma (UE Junior Red Warriors)
- Rookie of the Year: Lawrence Paladin (Zobel Junior Archers)

==== Girls' tournament ====
===== Elimination round =====
Pos	Team	Pld	W	L	PCT	GB	Qualification
1	NUNS Lady Bullpups	12	11	1	.917	—	Twice-to-beat in the semifinals
2	UST Junior Tigresses	12	10	2	.833	1	Twice-to-beat in the semifinals
3	Zobel Junior Lady Archers	12	7	5	.583	4	Twice-to-win in the semifinals
4	UE Junior Lady Warriors	11	5	6	.455	5.5	Twice-to-win in the semifinals
5	FEU–D Lady Baby Tamaraws	11	4	7	.364	6.5	
6	Adamson Lady Baby Falcons	12	4	8	.333	7	
7	UPIS Junior Lady Maroons (H)	12	0	12	.000	11	

Source: ABS-CBN Sports
Rules for classification: 1) winning percentage; 2) if tied for #2 or #4, one-game playoff; 3) head-to-head record; 4) head-to-head point differential; 5) overall point differential
(H) Hosts

===== Awards =====
- Most Valuable Player:
- Rookie of the Year:

== Beach volleyball ==
The UAAP Season 78 beach volleyball tournament began on October 9, 2015. The tournament venue was at the Sands at SM by the Bay SM Mall of Asia in Pasay, Metro Manila. University of Santo Tomas was the tournament host. Beach volleyball is a single round-robin elimination tournament.

=== Men's tournament ===
==== Elimination round ====
Team standings

Pos	Team	Pld	W	L	PCT	GB	Qualification
1	Ateneo Blue Eagles	7	7	0	1.000	—	Advance to the Finals
2	NU Bulldogs	7	6	1	.857	1	Twice-to-beat in stepladder round 2
3	UST Growling Tigers (H)	7	5	2	.714	2	Qualified to stepladder round 1
4	FEU Tamaraws	7	4	3	.571	3	Qualified to stepladder round 1
5	Adamson Soaring Falcons	7	3	4	.429	4	
6	UP Fighting Maroons	7	2	5	.286	5	
7	De La Salle Green Archers	7	1	6	.143	6	
8	UE Red Warriors	7	0	7	.000	7	

Source: ABS-CBN Sports
Rules for classification: 1) winning percentage; 2) if tied for #2 or #4, one-game playoff; 3) head-to-head record; 4) head-to-head point differential; 5) overall point differential
(H) Hosts

Match-up results

Team ╲ Game	1	2	3	4	5	6	7
AdMU	UP school colors	NU school colors	La Salle school colors	FEU school colors	Adamson school colors	UST school colors	UE school colors
AdU	NU school colors	UP school colors	UST school colors	La Salle school colors	Ateneo school colors	UE school colors	FEU school colors
DLSU	UE school colors	FEU school colors	Ateneo school colors	Adamson school colors	UST school colors	NU school colors	UP school colors
FEU	UST school colors	La Salle school colors	NU school colors	Ateneo school colors	UE school colors	UP school colors	Adamson school colors
NU	Adamson school colors	Ateneo school colors	FEU school colors	UE school colors	UP school colors	La Salle school colors	UST school colors
UE	La Salle school colors	UST school colors	UP school colors	NU school colors	FEU school colors	Adamson school colors	Ateneo school colors
UP	Ateneo school colors	Adamson school colors	UE school colors	UST school colors	NU school colors	FEU school colors	La Salle school colors
UST	FEU school colors	UE school colors	Adamson school colors	UP school colors	La Salle school colors	Ateneo school colors	NU school colors

= Win; = Loss

==== Playoffs ====
Stepladder round 1 (One-game playoff)
3	UST	2
4	FEU	1

Stepladder round 2 (No. 2 has twice-to-beat advantage)
2	NU	1	1
3	UST	2	2

Finals (#1 seed has thrice-to-beat advantage)
1	Ateneo	0	2	0	2
3	UST	2	1	2	0

==== Awards ====
- Most Valuable Player: Ysrael Wilson Marasigan (Ateneo Blue Eagles)
- Rookie of the Year: Jude Garcia (FEU Tamaraws)

=== Women's tournament ===
==== Elimination round ====
Team standings

Pos	Team	Pld	W	L	PCT	GB	Qualification
1	FEU Lady Tamaraws	7	6	1	.857	—	Twice-to-beat in the semifinals
2	De La Salle Lady Archers	7	5	2	.714 (Note: Second-seed playoff: La Salle 2–0 Ateneo)	1	Twice-to-beat in the semifinals
3	Ateneo Lady Eagles	7	5	2	.714	1	Twice-to-win in the semifinals
4	Adamson Lady Falcons	7	5	2	.714	1	Twice-to-win in the semifinals
5	UST Growling Tigresses (H)	7	4	3	.571	2	
6	UP Lady Maroons	7	2	5	.286	4	
7	NU Lady Bulldogs	7	1	6	.143	5	
8	UE Lady Warriors	7	0	7	.000	6	

Source: ABS-CBN Sports
Rules for classification: 1) winning percentage; 2) if tied for #2 or #4, one-game playoff; 3) head-to-head record; 4) head-to-head point differential; 5) overall point differential
(H) Hosts
Notes:

Match-up results

Team ╲ Game	1	2	3	4	5	6	7
AdU	UST school colors	UE school colors	La Salle school colors	Ateneo school colors	NU school colors	UP school colors	FEU school colors
AdMU	UP school colors	FEU school colors	NU school colors	Adamson school colors	La Salle school colors	UST school colors	UE school colors
DLSU	FEU school colors	UP school colors	Adamson school colors	UE school colors	Ateneo school colors	NU school colors	UST school colors
FEU	La Salle school colors	Ateneo school colors	UST school colors	NU school colors	UP school colors	UE school colors	Adamson school colors
NU	UE school colors	UST school colors	Ateneo school colors	FEU school colors	Adamson school colors	La Salle school colors	UP school colors
UE	NU school colors	Adamson school colors	UP school colors	La Salle school colors	UST school colors	FEU school colors	Ateneo school colors
UP	Ateneo school colors	La Salle school colors	UE school colors	UST school colors	FEU school colors	Adamson school colors	NU school colors
UST	Adamson school colors	NU school colors	FEU school colors	UP school colors	UE school colors	Ateneo school colors	La Salle school colors

= Win; = Loss

==== Playoffs ====
2nd-seed playoff
3	La Salle	2
4	Ateneo	0

Semifinals; Top seeds twice-to-beat
1	FEU	2
4	Adamson	0
2	La Salle	0	2
3	Ateneo	2	1

Finals; Best-of-three series
1	FEU	1	0
2	La Salle	2	2

==== Awards ====
- Most Valuable Player: Kim Fajardo (De La Salle Lady Archers)
- Rookie of the Year: Jasmine Nabor (NU Lady Bulldogs)

== Football ==
The UAAP Season 78 seniors' division football tournament started on February 7, 2016 at the Emperador McKinley Hill Stadium at Fort Bonifacio, Taguig City. The other tournament venues will be at the Moro Lorenzo Football Field of Ateneo de Manila University in Katipunan Ave., Loyola Heights, Quezon City and at the FEU Diliman Football Field. The tournament host is Ateneo with Jojo Rodriguez as the tournament commissioner.

=== Seniors' division ===
==== Men's tournament ====
===== Elimination round =====
====== Team standings ======
Pos	Team	Pld	W	D	L	GF	GA	GD	Pts	Qualification
1	UP Fighting Maroons	14	9	3	2	16	5	+11	30	Semifinals
2	De La Salle Green Archers	14	9	2	3	26	10	+16	29	Semifinals
3	Ateneo Blue Eagles (H)	14	8	1	5	32	21	+11	25	Semifinals
4	UST Growling Tigers	14	7	4	3	21	21	0	25	Semifinals
5	FEU Tamaraws	14	7	3	4	28	10	+18	24	
6	NU Bulldogs	14	4	5	5	26	18	+8	17	
7	Adamson Soaring Falcons	14	1	2	11	3	42	−39	5	
8	UE Red Warriors	14	0	2	12	4	29	−25	2	

Source: ABS-CBN Sports
(H) Hosts

==== Match-up results ====
	Round 1							Round 2						
Team ╲ Game	1	2	3	4	5	6	7	8	9	10	11	12	13	14
AdU	UST school colors	NU school colors	Ateneo school colors	UE school colors	UP school colors	La Salle school colors	FEU school colors	NU school colors	Ateneo school colors	FEU school colors	UP school colors	UST school colors	La Salle school colors	UE school colors
AdMU	La Salle school colors	FEU school colors	Adamson school colors	UP school colors	NU school colors	UST school colors	UE school colors	UE school colors	Adamson school colors	UST school colors	UP school colors	FEU school colors	La Salle school colors	NU school colors
DLSU	Ateneo school colors	UP school colors	UST school colors	FEU school colors	UE school colors	Adamson school colors	NU school colors	FEU school colors	UP school colors	NU school colors	UE school colors	Ateneo school colors	Adamson school colors	UST school colors
FEU	UP school colors	Ateneo school colors	NU school colors	La Salle school colors	UST school colors	UE school colors	Adamson school colors	La Salle school colors	UST school colors	Adamson school colors	UE school colors	NU school colors	Ateneo school colors	UP school colors
NU	UE school colors	Adamson school colors	FEU school colors	UST school colors	Ateneo school colors	UP school colors	La Salle school colors	Adamson school colors	UE school colors	La Salle school colors	FEU school colors	UP school colors	UST school colors	Ateneo school colors
UE	NU school colors	UST school colors	UP school colors	Adamson school colors	La Salle school colors	FEU school colors	Ateneo school colors	Ateneo school colors	NU school colors	UP school colors	FEU school colors	La Salle school colors	UST school colors	Adamson school colors
UP	FEU school colors	La Salle school colors	UE school colors	Ateneo school colors	Adamson school colors	NU school colors	UST school colors	UST school colors	La Salle school colors	UE school colors	Adamson school colors	Ateneo school colors	NU school colors	FEU school colors
UST	Adamson school colors	UE school colors	La Salle school colors	NU school colors	FEU school colors	Ateneo school colors	UP school colors	UP school colors	FEU school colors	Ateneo school colors	Adamson school colors	NU school colors	UE school colors	La Salle school colors

= Win; = Draw; = Loss

==== Playoffs ====
Semifinals
1	**UP**	**3**
4	UST	0
2	La Salle	1(4)
3	**Ateneo**	**1(5)**

Finals
1	**UP**	**4**
3	Ateneo	1

- **Bold** = winner
- * = after extra time, ( ) = penalty shootout score

===== Awards =====
- Most Valuable Player: Daniel Bernan Gadia (UP Fighting Maroons)
- Rookie of the Year: Darius Diamante (De La Salle Green Archers)

==== Women's tournament ====
===== Elimination round =====
====== Team standings ======
Pos	Team	Pld	W	D	L	GF	GA	GD	Pts	Qualification
1	De La Salle Lady Archers	8	6	2	0	23	8	+15	**20**	Finals
2	UP Lady Maroons	8	4	2	2	16	12	+4	**14**	Finals
3	Ateneo Lady Eagles (H)	8	3	0	5	13	15	−2	**9**	
4	FEU Lady Tamaraws	8	2	3	3	8	11	−3	**9**	
5	UST Growling Tigresses	8	1	1	6	10	24	−14	**4**	

Source: ABS-CBN Sports
(H) Hosts

==== Match-up results ====
	Round 1				Round 2			
Team ╲ Game	1	2	3	4	5	6	7	8
AdMU	La Salle school colors	UST school colors	UP school colors	FEU school colors	FEU school colors	La Salle school colors	UP school colors	UST school colors
DLSU	Ateneo school colors	FEU school colors	UST school colors	UP school colors	Ateneo school colors	UP school colors	UST school colors	FEU school colors
FEU	La Salle school colors	UST school colors	UP school colors	Ateneo school colors	Ateneo school colors	UP school colors	UST school colors	La Salle school colors
UP	UST school colors	Ateneo school colors	FEU school colors	La Salle school colors	UST school colors	FEU school colors	La Salle school colors	Ateneo school colors
UST	UP school colors	Ateneo school colors	FEU school colors	La Salle school colors	UP school colors	FEU school colors	La Salle school colors	Ateneo school colors

= Win; = Draw; = Loss

===== Finals =====
FT: UP 2 v 1 DLSU

===== Awards =====
- Most Valuable Player: Molly Manalansan (UP Lady Maroons)
- Rookie of the Year: Sara Castaneda (De La Salle Lady Archers)

=== Juniors' division ===
The UAAP Season 78 juniors division football tournament started on December 5, 2015 and ended on February 7, 2016 at the Moro Lorenzo Football Field in the Ateneo de Manila campus in Loyola Heights, Quezon City. FEU-Diliman was crowned as the champion of the tournament.

==== Boys' Tournament ====
===== Elimination round =====
====== Team standings ======
Pos	Team	Pld	W	D	L	GF	GA	GD	Pts	Qualification
1	FEU–D Baby Tamaraws	6	6	0	0	24	2	+22	**18**	Finals
2	Ateneo Blue Eaglets (H)	6	3	0	3	11	14	−3	**9**	Finals
3	Zobel Junior Archers	6	2	1	3	5	15	−10	**7**	Second-seed playoff
4	UST Tiger Cubs	6	0	1	5	0	9	−9	**1**	

Source: ABS-CBN Sports
(H) Hosts

====== Match-up results ======
	Round 1			Round 2		
Team ╲ Game	1	2	3	4	5	6
AdMU	La Salle school colors	UST school colors	FEU school colors	UST school colors	La Salle school colors	FEU school colors
DLSZ	Ateneo school colors	FEU school colors	UST school colors	FEU school colors	Ateneo school colors	UST school colors
FEU	UST school colors	La Salle school colors	Ateneo school colors	La Salle school colors	UST school colors	Ateneo school colors
UST	FEU school colors	Ateneo school colors	La Salle school colors	Ateneo school colors	FEU school colors	La Salle school colors

= Win; = Draw; = Loss

====== Scores ======
Team	AdMU	FEU	DLSU	UST
AdMU		0–6	0–3	2–0
FEU	4–2		6–0	1–0
DLSZ	1–6	0–3		0–0
UST	0–1	0–4	0–1	

Legend: Blue = left column team win; Yellow = draw; Red = top row team win.

Results to the right and top of the gray cells are first round games, those to the left and below are second round games.

===== Playoffs =====
February 3, 2016

Zobel Junior Archers	1–1 (a.e.t.)	Ateneo Blue Eaglets
Penalties
	2–3

===== Finals =====
February 7, 2016

FEU–D Baby Tamaraws	6–1	Ateneo Blue Eaglets
Christian Bacara 5'; Darryl Aban 12'; Chester Gio Pabualan 38'; Kieth Absalon 75'; John Villaseñor 85'; Josh Abundo 89'		Miguel Roque 30'

Moro Lorenzo Football Field

===== Awards =====
- Most Valuable Player: Kieth Absalon (FEU–D Baby Tamaraws)
- Rookie of the Year: Roberto Ripoll (FEU–D Baby Tamaraws)
- Best Striker: Chester Gio Pabualan (FEU–D Baby Tamaraws)
- Best Midfielder: Chester Gio Pabualan (FEU–D Baby Tamaraws)
- Best Defender: Roberto Ripoll (FEU–D Baby Tamaraws)
- Best Goalkeeper: Gavin Rosario (Ateneo Blue Eaglets)
- Fair Play Award: Zobel Junior Archers

== Baseball ==
=== Men's tournament ===
The UAAP Season 78 seniors' division baseball tournament began on February 4, 2016 at the Rizal Memorial Baseball Stadium in Malate Manila. The tournament host is La Salle.

==== Elimination round ====
Team standings

Pos	Team	Pld	W	L	PCT	GB	Qualification
1	Ateneo Blue Eagles	10	9	1	.900	—	Qualified to the Finals
2	De La Salle Green Archers (H)	9	7	2	.778	1.5	Qualified to the Finals
3	NU Bulldogs	8	3	5	.375	5	
4	Adamson Soaring Falcons	10	4	6	.400	5	
5	UST Growling Tigers	9	3	6	.333	5.5	
6	UP Fighting Maroons	9	1	8	.111	7.5	

Source: ABS-CBN Sports
Rules for classification: 1) winning percentage; 2) if tied for #2 or #4, one-game playoff; 3) head-to-head record; 4) head-to-head point differential; 5) overall point differential
(H) Hosts

Match-up results

	Round 1					Round 2				
Team ╲ Game	1	2	3	4	5	6	7	8	9	10
AdU	Ateneo school colors	UST school colors	La Salle school colors	NU school colors	UP school colors	NU school colors	UP school colors	La Salle school colors	Ateneo school colors	UST school colors
AdMU	Adamson school colors	NU school colors	UST school colors	UP school colors	La Salle school colors	UST school colors	NU school colors	UP school colors	Adamson school colors	La Salle school colors
DLSU	NU school colors	UP school colors	Adamson school colors	UST school colors	Ateneo school colors	UP school colors	UST school colors	Adamson school colors	NU school colors	Ateneo school colors
NU	La Salle school colors	Ateneo school colors	UP school colors	Adamson school colors	UST school colors	Adamson school colors	Ateneo school colors	UST school colors	La Salle school colors	UP school colors
UP	UST school colors	La Salle school colors	NU school colors	Ateneo school colors	Adamson school colors	La Salle school colors	Adamson school colors	Ateneo school colors	UST school colors	NU school colors
UST	UP school colors	Adamson school colors	Ateneo school colors	La Salle school colors	NU school colors	Ateneo school colors	La Salle school colors	NU school colors	UP school colors	Adamson school colors

= Win; = Loss

==== Scores ====
Results to the right and top of the gray cells are first round games, those to the left and below are second round games. Superscript is the number of innings played before the mercy rule applied.

Team	AdU	ADMU	DLSU	NU	UP	UST
Adamson		3–7	0–10			11–2
Ateneo	10–5		7–14	8–4	26–9	5–4
La Salle		16–19		7–8	7–4	14–9
NU		3–5			5–3	6–8
UP	10–3	10–11	5–14	6–8		4–5
UST	6–11	3–6	2–3	8–6	8–7	

Legend: Blue = left column team win; Red = top row team win.

==== Awards ====
- Most Valuable Player: Julius Diaz (UST Growling Tigers)
- Rookie of the Year: Julius Diaz (UST Growling Tigers)
- Best Hitter: Paulo Gonzalo Salud (De La Salle Green Archers)
- Best Slugger: Jose Miguel San Juan (UP Fighting Maroons)
- Best Pitcher: Juan Paulo Macasaet (Ateneo Blue Eagles)
- Most Stolen Bases (8): Marquis Rey Alindogan (Ateneo Blue Eagles)
- Most Runs Batted-In (12): Jerome Yenson (Adamson), Jonathan Park (La Salle) and Julius Diaz (UST)
- Most Home-runs (1): Marco Luis Mallari (Ateneo), Jose Maria Tantuico (Ateneo), Mark Steven Manaig (Adamson), Ariel Aligno (UST) and Kirk Daquis (UST)

=== Boys' tournament ===
The UAAP Season 78 juniors' division (demonstration sport) baseball tournament will begin on January 9, 2016 at the Rizal Memorial Baseball Stadium in Malate Manila. The tournament host is La Salle.

==== Elimination round ====
===== Team standings =====
Pos	Team	Pld	W	L	PCT	GB	Qualification
1	Ateneo Blue Eaglets	4	4	0	1.000	—	Qualified to the Finals with a twice-to-beat advantage
2	Zobel Junior Archers (H)	3	1	2	.333	2.5	Qualified to the Finals
3	UST Tiger Cubs	3	0	3	.000	3.5	

Source: ABS-CBN Sports
Rules for classification: 1) winning percentage; 2) if tied for #2 or #4, one-game playoff; 3) head-to-head record; 4) head-to-head point differential; 5) overall point differential
(H) Hosts

===== Match-up results =====
	Round 1		Round 2	
Team ╲ Game	1	2	3	4
AdMU	UST school colors	La Salle school colors	UST school colors	La Salle school colors
DLSZ	UST school colors	Ateneo school colors	UST school colors	Ateneo school colors
UST	La Salle school colors	Ateneo school colors	La Salle school colors	Ateneo school colors

= Win; = Loss

===== Scores =====
Team	AdMU	DLSZ	UST
Ateneo		10–3	11–8
La Salle	8–13		11–1
UST	8–13	–	

Legend: Blue = left column team win; Red = top row team win.

Results to the right and top of the gray cells are first round games, those to the left and below are second round games. Superscript is the number of innings played before the mercy rule applied.

==== Finals ====
Team 1	Score	Team 2
Ateneo Blue Eaglets	3–2	Zobel Junior Archers

==== Awards ====
- Most Valuable Player:
- Rookie of the Year:

== Softball ==
The UAAP Season 78 softball tournament began on January 30, 2016 at the Rizal Memorial Baseball Stadium in Malate Manila. The tournament host is La Salle.

=== Women's tournament ===
==== Elimination round ====
Team standings

Pos	Team	Pld	W	L	PCT	GB	Qualification
1	Adamson Lady Falcons	12	11	1	.917	—	Twice-to-beat in the semifinals
2	UST Growling Tigresses	12	8	4	.667	3	Twice-to-beat in the semifinals
3	NU Lady Bulldogs	12	8	4	.667	3	Twice-to-win in the semifinals
4	UP Lady Maroons	12	5	7	.417	6	Twice-to-win in the semifinals
5	De La Salle Lady Archers (H)	12	4	8	.333	7	
6	UE Lady Warriors	12	4	8	.333	7	
7	Ateneo Lady Eagles	12	2	10	.167	9	

Source: ABS-CBN Sports
Rules for classification: 1) winning percentage; 2) if tied for #2 or #4, one-game playoff; 3) head-to-head record; 4) head-to-head point differential; 5) overall point differential
(H) Hosts

Match-up results

	Round 1						Round 2					
Team ╲ Game	1	2	3	4	5	6	7	8	9	10	11	12
AdU	UST school colors	UP school colors	Ateneo school colors	La Salle school colors	UE school colors	NU school colors				NU school colors	La Salle school colors	UST school colors
AdMU	UP school colors	NU school colors	UST school colors	Adamson school colors	UE school colors	La Salle school colors			UE school colors	UST school colors		UP school colors
DLSU	NU school colors	UE school colors	UST school colors	Adamson school colors	UP school colors	Ateneo school colors				UP school colors	Adamson school colors	UE school colors
NU	La Salle school colors	Ateneo school colors	UE school colors	UP school colors	UST school colors	Adamson school colors					Adamson school colors	UE school colors
UE	UST school colors	La Salle school colors	NU school colors	UP school colors	Ateneo school colors	Adamson school colors			Ateneo school colors		NU school colors	La Salle school colors
UP	Ateneo school colors	Adamson school colors	UE school colors	NU school colors	La Salle school colors	UST school colors				La Salle school colors	UST school colors	Ateneo school colors
UST	UE school colors	Adamson school colors	Ateneo school colors	La Salle school colors	NU school colors	UP school colors				Ateneo school colors	UP school colors	Adamson school colors

= Win; = Loss

===== Scores =====
Team	AdU	ADMU	DLSU	NU	UE	UP	UST
Adamson			4–0	5–2	6–2	7–4	10–0^{4}
Ateneo			1–6	1–2	1–10^{6}	0–11^{4}	0–8^{6}
La Salle	2–4			2–10^{5}	3–4	1–3	
NU	3–7				6–0	3–2	6–5
UE			3–1	2–12^{5}			0–4
UP		8–1	2–4				2–1
UST	6–2	5–6		6–0		6–1	

Legend: Blue = left column team win; Red = top row team win.

Results to the right and top of the gray cells are first round games, those to the left and below are second round games. Superscript is the number of innings played before the mercy rule applied.

==== Awards ====
- Most Valuable Player: Queeny Sabobo (Adamson Lady Falcons)
- Rookie of the Year:

== Badminton ==
The UAAP Season 78 badminton tournament began on September 19, 2015. The tournament venue was the Rizal Memorial Badminton Hall in Vito Cruz St., Malate, Manila. Badminton is a single round-robin elimination tournament. Far Eastern University was the tournament host.

=== Seniors' division ===
==== Men's tournament ====
===== Elimination round =====
Team standings

Pos	Team	Pld	W	L	PCT	GB	Qualification
1	NU Bulldogs	7	7	0	1.000	—	Advance to the Finals
2	De La Salle Green Archers	7	6	1	.857	1	Twice-to-beat in stepladder round 2
3	Ateneo Blue Eagles	7	5	2	.714	2	Qualified to stepladder round 1
4	UP Fighting Maroons	7	4	3	.571	3	Qualified to stepladder round 1
5	UST Growling Tigers	7	3	4	.429	4	
6	FEU Tamaraws (H)	7	1	6	.143	6	
7	Adamson Soaring Falcons	7	1	6	.143	6	
8	UE Red Warriors	7	1	6	.143	6	

Source: ABS-CBN Sports
Rules for classification: 1) winning percentage; 2) if tied for #2 or #4, one-game playoff; 3) head-to-head record; 4) head-to-head point differential; 5) overall point differential
(H) Hosts

Match-up results

Team ╲ Game	1	2	3	4	5	6	7
ADMU	NU school colors	UE school colors	La Salle school colors	FEU school colors	UST school colors	Adamson school colors	UP school colors
AdU	FEU school colors	La Salle school colors	UE school colors	NU school colors	UP school colors	Ateneo school colors	UST school colors
DLSU	UP school colors	Adamson school colors	Ateneo school colors	UE school colors	FEU school colors	UST school colors	NU school colors
FEU	Adamson school colors	UP school colors	UST school colors	Ateneo school colors	La Salle school colors	NU school colors	UE school colors
NU	Ateneo school colors	UST school colors	UP school colors	Adamson school colors	UE school colors	FEU school colors	La Salle school colors
UE	UST school colors	Ateneo school colors	Adamson school colors	La Salle school colors	NU school colors	UP school colors	FEU school colors
UP	La Salle school colors	FEU school colors	NU school colors	UST school colors	Adamson school colors	UE school colors	Ateneo school colors
UST	UE school colors	NU school colors	FEU school colors	UP school colors	Ateneo school colors	La Salle school colors	Adamson school colors

= Win; = Loss

===== Playoffs =====
Stepladder round 1 (One-game playoff)
3	Ateneo	3
4	UP	2

Stepladder round 2 (No. 2 has twice-to-beat advantage)
2	La Salle	3
3	Ateneo	0

Finals (#1 seed has 1-0 lead in a best-of-5 series)
1	NU	3	3
2	La Salle	0	1

===== Awards =====
- Most Valuable Player: Peter Gabriel Magnaye (NU Bulldogs)
- Rookie of the Year: Keeyan Gabuelo (NU Bulldogs)

==== Women's tournament ====
===== Elimination round =====
Team standings

Pos	Team	Pld	W	L	PCT	GB	Qualification
1	UP Lady Maroons	7	7	0	1.000	—	Advance to the Finals
2	De La Salle Lady Archers	7	6	1	.857	1	Twice-to-beat in stepladder round 2
3	Ateneo Lady Eagles	7	5	2	.714	2	Qualified to stepladder round 1
4	FEU Lady Tamaraws (H)	7	4	3	.571	3	Qualified to stepladder round 1
5	UST Growling Tigresses	7	3	4	.429	4	
6	NU Lady Bulldogs	7	2	5	.286	5	
7	Adamson Lady Falcons	7	1	6	.143	6	
8	UE Lady Warriors	7	0	7	.000	7	

Source: ABS-CBN Sports
Rules for classification: 1) winning percentage; 2) if tied for #2 or #4, one-game playoff; 3) head-to-head record; 4) head-to-head point differential; 5) overall point differential
(H) Hosts

Match-up results

Team ╲ Game	1	2	3	4	5	6	7
AdMU	La Salle school colors	Adamson school colors	FEU school colors	UE school colors	NU school colors	UST school colors	UP school colors
AdU	NU school colors	Ateneo school colors	UE school colors	UP school colors	La Salle school colors	FEU school colors	UST school colors
DLSU	Ateneo school colors	NU school colors	UP school colors	UST school colors	Adamson school colors	UE school colors	FEU school colors
FEU	UP school colors	UE school colors	Ateneo school colors	NU school colors	UST school colors	Adamson school colors	La Salle school colors
NU	Adamson school colors	La Salle school colors	UST school colors	FEU school colors	Ateneo school colors	UP school colors	UE school colors
UE	UST school colors	FEU school colors	Adamson school colors	Ateneo school colors	UP school colors	La Salle school colors	NU school colors
UP	FEU school colors	UST school colors	La Salle school colors	Adamson school colors	UE school colors	NU school colors	Ateneo school colors
UST	UE school colors	UP school colors	NU school colors	La Salle school colors	FEU school colors	Ateneo school colors	Adamson school colors

= Win; = Loss

===== Playoffs =====
Stepladder round 1 (One-game playoff)
3	Ateneo	3
4	FEU	1

Stepladder round 2 (No. 2 has twice-to-beat advantage)
2	La Salle	1	1
3	Ateneo	3	3

Finals (#1 seed has 1-0 lead in a best-of-5 series)
1	UP	3	3
3	Ateneo	1	1

===== Awards =====
- Most Valuable Player: Paola Beatriz Bernardo (UP Fighting Maroons)
- Rookie of the Year: Eleanor Christine Inlayo (UP Fighting Maroons)

== Table tennis ==
The UAAP Season 78 table tennis tournament began on October 17, 2015. The tournament venue was Ninoy Aquino Stadium. University of the East was the tournament host.

=== Seniors' division ===
==== Men's tournament ====
===== Elimination round =====
====== Team standings ======
Pos	Team	Pld	W	L	PCT	GB	Qualification
1	De La Salle Green Archers	14	13	1	.929	—	Twice-to-beat in the semifinals
2	UST Growling Tigers	14	12	2	.857	1	Twice-to-beat in the semifinals
3	FEU Tamaraws	14	9	5	.643	4	Twice-to-win in the semifinals
4	NU Bulldogs	14	7	7	.500	6	Twice-to-win in the semifinals
5	UP Fighting Maroons	14	6	8	.429	7	
6	UE Red Warriors (H)	14	5	9	.357	8	
7	Adamson Soaring Falcons	14	4	10	.286	9	
8	Ateneo Blue Eagles	14	0	14	.000	13	

Source: ABS-CBN Sports
Rules for classification: 1) winning percentage; 2) if tied for #2 or #4, one-game playoff; 3) head-to-head record; 4) head-to-head point differential; 5) overall point differential
(H) Hosts

====== Match-up results ======
	Round 1							Round 2						
Team ╲ Game	1	2	3	4	5	6	7	8	9	10	11	12	13	14
AdU	Ateneo school colors	UP school colors	UE school colors	La Salle school colors	FEU school colors	UST school colors	NU school colors	UE school colors	UST school colors	Ateneo school colors	NU school colors	FEU school colors	La Salle school colors	UP school colors
AdMU	Adamson school colors	FEU school colors	NU school colors	UST school colors	UP school colors	La Salle school colors	UE school colors	UP school colors	NU school colors	Adamson school colors	FEU school colors	La Salle school colors	UST school colors	UE school colors
DLSU	UST school colors	NU school colors	FEU school colors	Adamson school colors	UE school colors	Ateneo school colors	UP school colors	NU school colors	UP school colors	FEU school colors	UE school colors	Ateneo school colors	Adamson school colors	UST school colors
FEU	UP school colors	Ateneo school colors	La Salle school colors	NU school colors	Adamson school colors	UE school colors	UST school colors	UST school colors	UE school colors	La Salle school colors	Ateneo school colors	Adamson school colors	UP school colors	NU school colors
NU	UE school colors	La Salle school colors	Ateneo school colors	FEU school colors	UST school colors	UP school colors	Adamson school colors	La Salle school colors	Ateneo school colors	UST school colors	Adamson school colors	UP school colors	UE school colors	FEU school colors
UE	NU school colors	UST school colors	Adamson school colors	UP school colors	La Salle school colors	FEU school colors	Ateneo school colors	Adamson school colors	FEU school colors	UP school colors	La Salle school colors	UST school colors	NU school colors	Ateneo school colors
UP	FEU school colors	Adamson school colors	UST school colors	UE school colors	Ateneo school colors	NU school colors	La Salle school colors	Ateneo school colors	La Salle school colors	UE school colors	UST school colors	NU school colors	FEU school colors	Adamson school colors
UST	La Salle school colors	UE school colors	UP school colors	Ateneo school colors	NU school colors	Adamson school colors	FEU school colors	FEU school colors	Adamson school colors	NU school colors	UP school colors	UE school colors	Ateneo school colors	La Salle school colors

= Win; = Loss

===== Playoffs =====
Semifinals (Nos. 1 & 2 have twice-to-beat advantage)
1	La Salle	3
4	NU	2
2	UST	3
3	FEU	1

Finals (Best-of-three series)
1	La Salle	3	3
2	UST	1	2

===== Awards =====
- Most Valuable Player: Walden Ledesma (De La Salle Green Archers)
- Rookie of the Year: Carlo Mateo (De La Salle Green Archers)

==== Women's tournament ====
===== Elimination round =====
====== Team standings ======
Pos	Team	Pld	W	L	PCT	GB	Qualification
1	De La Salle Lady Archers	14	14	0	1.000	—	Advance to the Finals
2	FEU Lady Tamaraws	14	11	3	.786	3	Twice-to-beat in stepladder round 2
3	UP Lady Maroons	14	9	5	.643	5	Qualified to stepladder round 1
4	UST Growling Tigresses	14	8	6	.571	6	Qualified to stepladder round 1
5	NU Lady Bulldogs	14	6	8	.429	8	
6	UE Lady Warriors (H)	14	5	9	.357	9	
7	Adamson Lady Falcons	14	2	12	.143	12	
8	Ateneo Lady Eagles	14	1	13	.071	13	

Source: ABS-CBN Sports
Rules for classification: 1) winning percentage; 2) if tied for #2 or #4, one-game playoff; 3) head-to-head record; 4) head-to-head point differential; 5) overall point differential
(H) Hosts

====== Match-up results ======
	Round 1							Round 2						
Team ╲ Game	1	2	3	4	5	6	7	8	9	10	11	12	13	14
AdU	Ateneo school colors	FEU school colors	NU school colors	UP school colors	La Salle school colors	UST school colors	UE school colors	UE school colors	UST school colors	NU school colors	FEU school colors	La Salle school colors	UP school colors	Ateneo school colors
ADMU	Adamson school colors	UP school colors	UE school colors	La Salle school colors	UST school colors	FEU school colors	NU school colors	La Salle school colors	UST school colors	UP school colors	FEU school colors	UE school colors	NU school colors	Adamson school colors
DLSU	FEU school colors	NU school colors	UST school colors	Ateneo school colors	Adamson school colors	UE school colors	UP school colors	UST school colors	UE school colors	UP school colors	NU school colors	Adamson school colors	Ateneo school colors	FEU school colors
FEU	La Salle school colors	Adamson school colors	UP school colors	UE school colors	NU school colors	Ateneo school colors	UST school colors	UP school colors	NU school colors	UE school colors	Adamson school colors	Ateneo school colors	UST school colors	La Salle school colors
NU	UE school colors	La Salle school colors	Adamson school colors	UST school colors	FEU school colors	UP school colors	Ateneo school colors	Ateneo school colors	FEU school colors	Adamson school colors	La Salle school colors	UP school colors	UST school colors	UE school colors
UE	NU school colors	UST school colors	Ateneo school colors	FEU school colors	UP school colors	La Salle school colors	Adamson school colors	Adamson school colors	La Salle school colors	FEU school colors	UST school colors	Ateneo school colors	NU school colors	UP school colors
UP	UST school colors	Ateneo school colors	FEU school colors	Adamson school colors	UE school colors	NU school colors	La Salle school colors	FEU school colors	Ateneo school colors	La Salle school colors	NU school colors	UST school colors	Adamson school colors	UE school colors
UST	UP school colors	UE school colors	La Salle school colors	NU school colors	Ateneo school colors	Adamson school colors	FEU school colors	La Salle school colors	Ateneo school colors	Adamson school colors	UE school colors	UP school colors	FEU school colors	NU school colors

= Win; = Loss

===== Playoffs =====
Stepladder round 1 (One-game playoff)
3	UP	2
4	UST	3

Stepladder round 2 (No. 2 has twice-to-beat advantage)
2	FEU	2	3
3	UST	3	1

Finals (#1 seed has 1-0 lead in a best-of-5 series)
1	La Salle	3	3
2	FEU	0	1

===== Awards =====
- Most Valuable Player: Ian Lariba (De La Salle Lady Archers)
- Rookie of the Year: Emy Rose Dael (De La Salle Lady Archers)

== Taekwondo ==
The UAAP Season 78 taekwondo tournament began on October 23, 2015. The tournament venue was the Ateneo Blue Eagle Gym in Loyola Heights, Quezon City, Metro Manila. Taekwondo is a single round-robin elimination tournament. Ateneo de Manila University was the tournament host.

=== Seniors' division ===
==== Men's tournament ====
===== Elimination round =====
Team standings

Pos	Team	Pld	W	L	PCT	GB
1	UST Growling Tigers	6	5	1	.833	—
2	UE Red Warriors	6	5	1	.833	—
3	De La Salle Green Archers	6	4	2	.667	1
4	UP Fighting Maroons	6	2	4	.333	3
5	Ateneo Blue Eagles (H)	6	2	4	.333	3
6	FEU Tamaraws	6	2	4	.333	3
7	NU Bulldogs	6	1	5	.167	4

Source: ABS-CBN Sports
Rules for classification: 1) winning percentage; 2) if tied for #2 or #4, one-game playoff; 3) head-to-head record; 4) head-to-head point differential; 5) overall point differential
(H) Hosts

Match-up results

Team ╲ Game	1	2	3	4	5	6
AdMU	UP school colors	UST school colors	NU school colors	UE school colors	FEU school colors	La Salle school colors
DLSU	UE school colors	NU school colors	FEU school colors	UST school colors	Ateneo school colors	UP school colors
FEU	UST school colors	UE school colors	La Salle school colors	NU school colors	Ateneo school colors	UP school colors
NU	La Salle school colors	UP school colors	Ateneo school colors	FEU school colors	UST school colors	UE school colors
UE	La Salle school colors	FEU school colors	UP school colors	Ateneo school colors	NU school colors	UST school colors
UP	Ateneo school colors	NU school colors	UE school colors	UST school colors	FEU school colors	La Salle school colors
UST	FEU school colors	Ateneo school colors	UP school colors	La Salle school colors	NU school colors	UE school colors

= Win; = Loss

===== Awards =====
- Most Valuable Player: Joaquin Mendoza (UST Growling Tigers)
- Rookie of the Year: Kyle Arsenal (De La Salle Green Archers)

==== Women's tournament ====
===== Elimination round =====
Team standings

Pos	Team	Pld	W	L	PCT	GB
1	UE Lady Warriors	6	6	0	1.000	—
2	UST Growling Tigresses	6	5	1	.833	1
3	De La Salle Lady Archers	6	4	2	.667	2
4	FEU Lady Tamaraws	6	2	4	.333	4
5	UP Lady Maroons	6	2	4	.333	4
6	Ateneo Lady Eagles (H)	6	2	4	.333	4
7	NU Lady Bulldogs	6	0	6	.000	6

Source: ABS-CBN Sports
Rules for classification: 1) winning percentage; 2) if tied for #2 or #4, one-game playoff; 3) head-to-head record; 4) head-to-head point differential; 5) overall point differential
(H) Hosts

Match-up results

Team ╲ Game	1	2	3	4	5	6
AdMU	UE school colors	UST school colors	La Salle school colors	UP school colors	FEU school colors	NU school colors
DLSU	NU school colors	FEU school colors	Ateneo school colors	UE school colors	UP school colors	UST school colors
FEU	UST school colors	La Salle school colors	UP school colors	NU school colors	Ateneo school colors	UE school colors
NU	La Salle school colors	UP school colors	FEU school colors	UST school colors	UE school colors	Ateneo school colors
UE	UP school colors	Ateneo school colors	UST school colors	La Salle school colors	NU school colors	FEU school colors
UP	UE school colors	NU school colors	FEU school colors	Ateneo school colors	La Salle school colors	UST school colors
UST	FEU school colors	Ateneo school colors	UE school colors	NU school colors	UP school colors	La Salle school colors

= Win; = Loss

===== Awards =====
- Most Valuable Player: Karen Celis (UE Lady Warriors)
- Rookie of the Year: Baby Jessica Canabal (UE Lady Warriors)

=== Juniors' division ===
==== Boys' tournament ====
===== Elimination round =====
====== Team standings ======
Pos	Team	Pld	W	L	PCT	GB
1	UE Junior Red Warriors	5	5	0	1.000	—
2	FEU–D Baby Tamaraws	5	4	1	.800	1
3	UST Tiger Cubs	5	3	2	.600	2
4	Ateneo Blue Eaglets (H)	0	0	0	—	2.5
5	Zobel Junior Archers	0	0	0	—	2.5
6	NUNS Bullpups	0	0	0	—	2.5

Source: ABS-CBN Sports
Rules for classification: 1) winning percentage; 2) if tied for #2 or #4, one-game playoff; 3) head-to-head record; 4) head-to-head point differential; 5) overall point differential
(H) Hosts

====== Match-up results ======
Team ╲ Game	1	2	3	4	5
AdMU					
DLSU					
FEU					
NU					
UE					
UST	FEU school colors	UE school colors	NU school colors	Ateneo school colors	La Salle school colors

= Win; = Loss

===== Awards =====
- Most Valuable Player:
- Rookie of the Year:

== Judo ==
The UAAP Season 78 Judo Championships was held from November 18–19, 2015 at the La Salle Greenhills Gym . The tournament host was De La Salle University.

=== Seniors' division ===
==== Men's tournament ====
===== Elimination round =====
====== Team standings ======
Rank	Team	Medals				Points
Rank	Team	1st place, gold medalist(s)	2nd place, silver medalist(s)	3rd place, bronze medalist(s)	**Total**	Points
Champions	Ateneo	5	1	3	9	**61**
Runners-up	UST	1	5	5	11	**45**
Third-placers	**La Salle**	1	1	2	4	**19**
4	UP	1	0	4	5	**18**
5	UE	0	1	2	3	**9**
6	Adamson	0	0	0	0	**0**

Event host in **boldface**

===== Awards =====
- Most Valuable Player: Monch Santiago (Ateneo Blue Eagles)
- Rookie of the Year: Christian Dominic Clemente (Ateneo Blue Eagles)

Medal	Pts.
1st	10
2nd	5
3rd	2

==== Women's tournament ====
===== Elimination round =====
====== Team standings ======
Rank	Team	Medals				Points
Rank	Team	1st place, gold medalist(s)	2nd place, silver medalist(s)	3rd place, bronze medalist(s)	**Total**	Points
1st place, gold medalist(s)	UST	5	4	3	12	**76**
2nd place, silver medalist(s)	UE	2	2	2	6	**29**
3rd place, bronze medalist(s)	UP	0	2	5	7	**20**
4	Ateneo	1	0	1	2	**12**
5	**La Salle**	0	0	4	4	**8**
6	Adamson	0	0	1	1	**2**

Event host in **boldface**

===== Awards =====
- Most Valuable Player:
- Rookie of the Year:

=== Juniors' division ===
==== Boys' tournament ====
===== Elimination round =====
====== Team standings ======
Rank	Team	Medals				Points
Rank	Team	1st place, gold medalist(s)	2nd place, silver medalist(s)	3rd place, bronze medalist(s)	**Total**	Points
1st place, gold medalist(s)	UST					**53**
2nd place, silver medalist(s)	Ateneo	2	1	3	6	**31**
3rd place, bronze medalist(s)	**La Salle**					**25**
4	FEU					**24**
5	UE					**17**
6	UP	0	0	0	0	**0**

Event host in **boldface**

===== Awards =====
- Most Valuable Player:
- Rookie of the Year:

==== Girls' tournament ====
This is a demonstration event.

===== Elimination round =====
====== Team standings ======
Rank	Team	Medals				Points
Rank	Team	1st place, gold medalist(s)	2nd place, silver medalist(s)	3rd place, bronze medalist(s)	**Total**	Points
1st place, gold medalist(s)	UST	0	0	0	0	0
2nd place, silver medalist(s)	FEU	0	0	0	0	0
3rd place, bronze medalist(s)	**La Salle**	0	0	0	0	0
4	UE	0	0	0	0	0

Event host in **boldface**

===== Awards =====
- Most Valuable Player:
- Rookie of the Year:

== Swimming ==
The UAAP Season 78 swimming championships was held on October 22–25, 2015 at the Rizal Memorial Swimming Pool in Vito Cruz St., Malate, Manila. The tournament host was National University and tournament commissioner was Richard G. Luna.

Team ranking is determined by a point system, similar to that of the overall championship. The points given are based on the swimmer's/team's finish in the finals of an event, which include only the top eight finishers from the preliminaries. The gold medalist(s) receive 15 points, silver gets 12, bronze has 10. The following points: 8, 6, 4, 2 and 1 are given to the rest of the participating swimmers/teams according to their order of finish.

=== Seniors' division ===
==== Men's tournament ====
**Team standings (final)**

Rank	Team	Medals				Rec	Points
Rank	Team	1st place, gold medalist(s)	2nd place, silver medalist(s)	3rd place, bronze medalist(s)	**Total**	Rec	Points
1st place, gold medalist(s)	Ateneo	19	9	9	37	15	563
2nd place, silver medalist(s)	La Salle	2	8	5	15	3	286
3rd place, bronze medalist(s)	UP	0	3	6	9	1	199
4	UST	0	1	3	4	0	120
5	**NU**	0	0	1	1	0	73
6	UE	0	0	0	0	0	16
7	Adamson	0	0	0	0	0	12

**Rec** - Number of new swimming records established
Event host in **boldface**

===== Awards =====
- Most Valuable Player: Jessie Khing Lacuna (Ateneo Blue Eagles)
- Rookie of the Year: Arian Neil Puyo (De La Salle Green Archers)

==== Women's tournament ====
**Team standings (final)**

Rank	Team	Medals				Rec	Points
Rank	Team	1st place, gold medalist(s)	2nd place, silver medalist(s)	3rd place, bronze medalist(s)	**Total**	Rec	Points
1st place, gold medalist(s)	Ateneo	15	7	4	26	3	428
2nd place, silver medalist(s)	UP	5	9	6	20	0	419
3rd place, bronze medalist(s)	La Salle	1	5	3	9	0	177
4	UST	0	0	8	8	0	113
5	UE	0	0	0	0	0	28
6	Adamson	0	0	0	0	0	0

**Rec** - Number of new swimming records established

===== Awards =====
- Most Valuable Player: Hannah Dato (Ateneo Lady Eagles)
- Rookie of the Year: Romina Rafaelle Gavino (Ateneo Lady Eagles)

Pos.	Pts.
1st	15
2nd	12
3rd	10
4th	8
5th	6
6th	4
7th	2
8th	1

=== Juniors' division ===
==== Boys' tournament ====
**Team standings (final)**

Rank	Team	Medals				Rec	Points
Rank	Team	1st place, gold medalist(s)	2nd place, silver medalist(s)	3rd place, bronze medalist(s)	**Total**	Rec	Points
1st place, gold medalist(s)	Ateneo	10	11	9	30	8	503
2nd place, silver medalist(s)	La Salle	8	2	4	14	5	293
3rd place, bronze medalist(s)	UST	0	6	5	11	0	241
4	UE	1	2	3	6	0	90
5	UP	2	0	0	2	0	77
6	**NU**	0	0	1	1	0	44

**Rec** - Number of new swimming records established
Event host in **boldface**

===== Awards =====
- Most Valuable Player: Maurice Sacho Ilustre (Zobel Junior Archers)
- Rookie of the Year: Rafael Barreto (Ateneo Blue Eaglets)

==== Girls' tournament ====
**Team standings (final)**

Rank	Team	Medals				Rec	Points
Rank	Team	1st place, gold medalist(s)	2nd place, silver medalist(s)	3rd place, bronze medalist(s)	**Total**	Rec	Points
1st place, gold medalist(s)	UST	10	6	7	23	5	422
2nd place, silver medalist(s)	DLSZ	9	5	2	16	6	298
3rd place, bronze medalist(s)	UPIS	1	5	9	15	1	289
4	UE	0	4	2	6	0	135
5	**NU**	0	0	0	0	0	8

**Rec** - Number of new swimming records established

Event host in **boldface**

===== Awards =====
- Most Valuable Player: Nicole Meah Pamintuan (Zobel Junior Lady Archers)
- Rookie of the Year: Camille Lauren Buico (UST Junior Tigresses)

== Performance sports ==
=== Cheerdance ===
The UAAP Season 78 Cheerdance Competition was held on October 3, 2015, at the Mall of Asia Arena in Pasay. It was hosted by Boom Gonzalez and Sofia Andres and was attended by 25,388 spectators. The cheerdance competition is an exhibition event, and no championship points are awarded to the participating schools.

==== Team standings ====
Rank	Team	Order	Tumbling	Stunts	Tosses	Pyramids	Dance	Penalties	Points	Percentage
1	NU Pep Squad	4	91.50	70.50	84.00	88.00	340.00	–6	668.00	83.50 %
2	UST Salinggawi Dance Troupe	8	85.50	63.00	69.00	83.00	354.00	–3	651.50	81.44 %
3	UP Pep Squad	1	77.00	68.50	56.00	85.00	324.00	0	610.50	76.31 %
4	FEU Cheering Squad	7	83.50	60.00	58.00	82.00	306.00	–6	583.50	72.94 %
5	UE Pep Squad	5	80.00	55.00	67.00	84.00	306.00	–9	583.00	72.88 %
6	DLSU Animo Squad	2	66.50	66.00	49.00	65.00	300.00	–8	538.00	67.25 %
7	Adamson Pep Squad	6	70.50	58.00	55.00	77.00	281.00	–28	513.50	64.19 %
8	Ateneo Blue Babble Battalion	3	55.00	45.00	39.00	68.00	232.00	–27	412.00	51.50 %

The UP Pep Squad was the first to perform, followed by the UST Salinggawi Dance Troupe as the final performer. The NU Pep Squad earned the highest points in tumbling, stunts, tosses, and pyramids, and won the championship for that season. The UST Salinggawi Dance Troupe placed first runner-up and achieved the highest dance score, while the UP Pep Squad finished as second runner-up.

Stunner Awardee: No stunner awardee that season.

- Special awards from sponsors:
  - Purefoods Eats So Easy Move: Adamson Pep Squad
  - Oishi Oh Wow Surprising Move: FEU Cheering Squad
  - Smart Fearless Jump: UST Salinggawi Dance Troupe
  - Yamaha Best Toss: UP Pep Squad
  - PLDT Famtastic Pyramid: UP Pep Squad

==== Group stunts competition ====
Champion	2nd place	3rd place
UST	NU	FEU

=== Street dance ===
The 4th UAAP Street Dance Competition was held on April 9, 2016 at the Mall of Asia Arena in Pasay hosted by upfront at the UAAP host Justin Quirino and Myx VJ Ai dela Cruz. Street dance competition is an exhibition event. Points for the general championship are not awarded to the participating schools. NU Underdawgz has decided to forgo their participation in this season's streetdance competition.

Rank	Team
1st place, gold medalist(s)	UP Street Dance Club
2nd place, silver medalist(s)	La Salle Dance Company–Street
3rd place, bronze medalist(s)	UST Hype Crew
4	Company of Ateneo Dancers
	Adamson CAST
	FEU Dance Company
	UE Armada

The host team is in boldface.

== General championship summary ==
The general champion is determined by a point system. The system gives 15 points to the champion team of a UAAP event, 12 to the runner-up, and 10 to the third placer. The following points: 8, 6, 4, 2 and 1 are given to the rest of the participating teams according to their order of finish.

=== Medals table ===
==== Seniors' division ====
Rank	Team	Gold	Silver	Bronze	Total
1	De La Salle University	6	3	10	19
2	Ateneo de Manila University	5	5	5	15
3	National University	5	1	3	9
4	University of Santo Tomas	4	11	1	16
5	University of the Philippines Diliman*	3	3	5	11
6	University of the East	3	2	2	7
7	Far Eastern University	2	4	2	8
8	Adamson University	1	0	1	2
Totals (8 entries)		29	29	29	87

* Host nation (Season host); General champions
Notes: Results are final.

==== Juniors' division ====
Rank	Team	Gold	Silver	Bronze	Total
1	University of the East	4	2	1	7
2	Nazareth School of National University	3	1	1	5
3	University of Santo Tomas	2	4	2	8
4	De La Salle Zobel	2	3	3	8
5	Far Eastern University–Diliman	2	1	1	4
6	Ateneo de Manila University	1	3	1	5
7	UP Integrated School*	0	0	2	2
8	Adamson University	0	0	1	1
Totals (8 entries)		14	14	12	40

* Host nation (Season host); General champions
Notes: Results are final.

=== General championship tally ===
==== Seniors' division ====
		Basketball		Volleyball (indoor)		Volleyball (beach)		Swimming		Chess		Tennis		Table tennis		Badminton		Taekwondo			Judo		Baseball	Softball	Football		Athletics		Fencing		Total			
Rank	Team	M	W	M	W	M	W	M	W	M	W	M	W	M	W	M	W	M	W	C	M	W	M	W	M	W	M	W	M	W	M	W	C	Overall
1	La Salle	6	10	4	15	2	15	12	10	10	15	4	8	15	15	12	10	10	10	10	10	6	15	4	10	12	8	8	6	10	124	148	10	282
2	UST	12	6	2	4	12	6	8	8	12	6	6	12	12	10	6	6	15	12	15	12	15	6	12	8	6	12	15	12	12	135	130	15	280
3	Ateneo	10	12	15	12	15	10	15	15	2	1	8	10	1	1	10	12	6	4	6	15	8	12	2	12	10	4	2	4	4	129	103	6	238
4	UP (H)	2	2	8	8	4	4	10	12	1	10	12	6	6	8	8	15	8	6	12	8	10	4	8	15	15	10	6	10	8	106	118	12	236
5	FEU	15	1	6	10	8	12	—	—	8	12	—	—	10	12	4	8	4	8	8	—	—	—	—	6	8	15	12	8	6	84	89	8	181
6	NU	8	15	12	6	10	2	6	—	15	8	15	15	8	6	15	4	2	2	4	—	—	10	10	4	—	—	—	—	—	105	68	4	177
7	UE	4	8	1	1	1	1	4	6	6	4	10	—	4	4	1	1	12	15	—	6	12	—	6	1	—	6	10	15	15	71	83	0	154
8	Adamson	1	4	10	2	6	8	2	—	4	2	—	—	2	2	2	2	—	—	—	4	4	8	15	2	—	2	4	—	—	43	43	0	86

(H) Season host; = Champion; = Runner-up; = Third place; — = No team.
Notes: Results are final.

==== Juniors' division ====
		Basketball	Volleyball (indoor)		Swimming		Chess	Table tennis		Taekwondo	Judo	Football	Athletics	Fencing		Total				
Rank	Team	B	B	G	B	G	C	B	G	B	B	B	B	B	G	B	G	C	K	Overall
1	UST	2	8	12	10	15	12	8	8	10	15	8	6	12	12	79	47	12	0	138
2	UE	1	12	8	8	8	8	10	12	15	6	—	15	15	15	82	43	8	0	133
3	DLSZ	12	4	10	12	12	2	15	15	—	10	10	4	—	—	67	37	2	0	106
4	NSNU	15	15	15	4	6	10	12	—	—	—	—	—	—	—	46	21	10	0	77
5	FEU–D	8	10	6	—	—	15	—	—	12	8	15	—	—	—	53	6	15	0	74
6	Ateneo	10	6	—	15	—	4	—	—	—	12	12	12	—	—	67	0	4	0	71
7	UPIS (H)	4	2	2	6	10	—	—	6	—	4	—	10	—	—	26	18	0	0	44
8	Adamson	6	—	4	—	—	6	—	10	—	—	—	8	—	—	14	14	6	0	34

(H) Season host; = Champion; = Runner-up; = Third place; — = No team.
Notes: Results are final.

== Closing ceremony ==
The UAAP Season 78 closing ceremony was held at the Bahay ng Alumni of the UP-Diliman Campus. The highlight of the 5 p.m. event is the announcement of the league's Athlete of the Year. All MVPs from 15 sporting disciplines of the UAAP are eligible to win the Athlete of the Year award. The UAAP were given out special citations to student-athletes who excel in their academics and some who represent the country in local and international competitions.

The closing ceremony has also featured the turn-over of the flag of the UAAP to Season 79 host University of Santo Tomas.

- Co-Athletes of the Year (Seniors)
  - Team Sports Category:
    - Alyssa Valdez (Ateneo / Women's Volleyball)
    - Queeny Sabobo (Adamson / Softball)
  - Individual Sports Category:
    - Jessie Khing Lacuna (Ateneo / Men's Swimming)
    - Ian Lariba (La Salle / Table Tennis)
- Athlete of the Year (Juniors)
  - John Lloyd Osorio (UE / Track and Field)
- Athlete Scholars Citations:
  - Alex Toni Steven Ngui (Ateneo / Men's Swimming)
  - David Camacho (Adamson / Men's Basketball)
  - David Angelo Diamante (La Salle / Men's Football)
  - Noelito Jose, Jr. (UST / Men's Fencing)
  - Mary Remy Palma (FEU / Women's Volleyball)
  - Cyrene Torres (NU / Women's Table Tennis)
  - Karen Cells (UE / Women's Taekwando)
  - Janna Dominique Oliva (UP / Poomsae)

== Broadcast coverage ==
Starting from Season 78 until Season 82, ABS-CBN Sports will still the broadcast coverer of the UAAP. ABS-CBN Sports+Action, Balls HD 195 for the basketball tournament only and ABS-CBN Sports+Action International will cover the games on a live basis, with Finals games on ABS-CBN Channel 2 and ABS-CBN HD 167 and replays on ABS-CBN Sports+Action, they also introduced the newest batch of courtside reporters for the broadcast coverage. Laura Lehmann and Jeanine Tsoi, had returned as the courtside reporters for Ateneo and La Salle, with 6 new faces.

The High Definition channel will be aired on Balls HD 195 for the basketball tournament only after the said channel was ceased off. The HD channel has been transfer to ABS-CBN Sports+Action HD 166 for the volleyball tournament.

Aside from the refreshed line-up of the panel, including returnee Mico Halili (current anchor of CNN Philippines SportsDesk) who last worked with ABS-CBN Sports in the MBA Games and the league until Season 65 (2002), Anton Roxas and Allan Gregorio will not return to the UAAP basketball panel since they been returned to the NCAA basketball panel but Roxas will return for the UAAP volleyball panel. Noreen Go will also not return to the volleyball panel since she was chosen as a commissioner of the UAAP Volleyball tournament season 78. The coverage will have a pre-game show called "Upfront at the UAAP" every gamedays at 1:30pm, the show will delivered the latest updates and features in all of the sports disciplines of the league.

Anchors

- Marielle Benitez (Football only)
- Boom Gonzales (Basketball & Volleyball)
- Bob Guerrero (Football only)
- Mico Halili (Basketball only)
- Jing Jamlang (Football only)
- Ian Laurel (Volleyball only)
- TJ Manotoc (Basketball Finals & Football)
- Nikko Ramos (Basketball only)
- Anton Roxas (Volleyball only)
- Eric Tipan (Basketball & Volleyball)

Analysts (basketball)

- Marco Benitez
- Enzo Flojo
- Christian Luanzon
- TJ Manotoc
- Renren Ritualo
- Randy Sacdalan

Analysts (Volleyball)

- Michele Gumabao
- Ian Laurel
- Denden Lazaro
- Kirk Long
- Ronnie Magsanoc
- Mozzy Ravena
- Anne Remulla-Canda
- Ivy Remulla

Analysts (Football)

- Natasha Alquiros
- Marielle Benitez
- Mikee Carrion
- Darren Hartmann
- Armand del Rosario

Courtside reporters

- Stef Monce - Adamson
- Laura Lehmann - Ateneo
- Ganiel Krishnan - FEU
- Jennine Tsoi - La Salle
- Ira Pablo - NU
- Paui Verzosa - UE
- Nina Alvia - UP
- Angelique Manto - UST

Upfront at the UAAP hosts

- Bea Daez (Basketball & Volleyball)
- Janeena Chan (Basketball & Volleyball)
- Addie Manzano (Basketball & Volleyball)
- Natasha Alquiros (Basketball & Volleyball)
- Richard Juan (Volleyball only)
- Justin Quirino (Volleyball only)
- Marco Gumabao (Volleyball only)

Additional Cast:

- Opening Ceremony Host: Boom Gonzales
- Tumitinding Sumusulong: The UAAP Season 78 Primer Host: TJ Manotoc
- UAAP Season 78 Cheerdance Competition Host: Boom Gonzales and Sofia Andres
- UAAP Season 78 Beach Volleyball Finals Crew: Ian Laurel and Mozzy Ravena
- UAAP Season 78 Baseball and Softball Finals Crew: Anton Roxas and Kiko Diaz
- UAAP Season 78 Men's and Women's Tennis Finals Crew: Dyan Castillejo and Eric Tipan
- UAAP Season 78 Streetdance Competition Hosts: Justin Quirino and Ai dela Cruz

== See also ==
- NCAA Season 91
