= UAAP Season 77 basketball tournaments =

Basketball season

UAAP Season 77
- Host school: University of the East
Men's Finals	G1	G2	G3	Wins
FEU Tamaraws	75	47	59	1
NU Bulldogs	70	62	75	2
- Duration: October 4–15, 2014
- Arena(s): Smart Araneta Coliseum; Mall of Asia Arena
- Finals MVP: Alfred Aroga
- Winning coach: Eric Altamirano (1st title)
- Semifinalists: De La Salle Green Archers; Ateneo Blue Eagles
- TV network(s): ABS-CBN, ABS-CBN Sports and Action, The Filipino Channel, Balls, Balls HD
Women's Finals	G1	G2	Wins
NU Lady Bulldogs	80	59	2+1
FEU Lady Tamaraws	58	48	0
- Duration: October 1–4, 2014
- Arena(s): Smart Araneta Coliseum; Mall of Asia Arena
- Finals MVP: Gemma Miranda
- Winning coach: Patrick Aquino (1st title)
- Semifinalists: De La Salle Lady Archers; UST Growling Tigresses
- TV network(s): ABS-CBN Sports and Action, The Filipino Channel, Balls, Balls HD
Juniors' Finals	G1	G2	G3	Wins
Ateneo Blue Eaglets	72	78	90	2+1
NUNS Bullpups	76	76	73	1
- Duration: February 13–20, 2015
- Arena(s): Filoil Flying V Arena
- Finals MVP: Jolo Mendoza
- Winning coach: Joe Silva (1st title)
- Semifinalists: Zobel Junior Archers; Adamson Baby Falcons
- TV network(s): ABS-CBN Sports and Action

The UAAP Season 77 basketball tournaments were held in school year 2014–15. University of the East was the season host. The basketball tournaments started with a doubleheader basketball games after the opening ceremonies on July 12, 2014 at the Smart Araneta Coliseum. ABS-CBN UHF channel Sports and Action broadcast the men's tournament for the fifteenth consecutive year.

== Men's tournament ==
=== Teams ===
Team	University	Coach
Adamson Soaring Falcons	Adamson University (AdU)	(Philippines) Kenneth Duremdes
Ateneo Blue Eagles	Ateneo de Manila University (ADMU)	(Philippines) Bo Perasol
De La Salle Green Archers	De La Salle University (DLSU)	(Philippines) Juno Sauler
FEU Tamaraws	Far Eastern University (FEU)	(Philippines) Nash Racela
NU Bulldogs	National University (NU)	(Philippines) Eric Altamirano
UE Red Warriors	University of the East (UE)	(Philippines) Derrick Pumaren
UP Fighting Maroons	University of the Philippines Diliman (UP)	(Philippines) Rey Madrid
UST Growling Tigers	University of Santo Tomas (UST)	(Philippines) Bong dela Cruz

==== Coaching changes ====
Team	Old coach	Reason	New coach
Adamson	(Philippines) Leo Austria	Resigned	(Philippines) Kenneth Duremdes
UE	(Philippines) Boyzie Zamar	Fired	(Philippines) Derrick Pumaren
UST	(Philippines) Pido Jarencio	Signed by Globalport Batang Pier	(Philippines) Bong dela Cruz

=== Elimination round ===
==== Team standings ====
Pos	Team	W	L	PCT	GB	Qualification
1	Ateneo Blue Eagles	11	3	.786	—	Twice-to-beat in the semifinals
2	FEU Tamaraws	10	4	.714 (Note: Second-seed playoff: FEU 65–60 La Salle)	1	Twice-to-beat in the semifinals
3	De La Salle Green Archers	10	4	.714	1	Twice-to-win in the semifinals
4	NU Bulldogs	9	5	.643 (Note: Fourth-seed playoff: NU 51–49 UE)	2	Twice-to-win in the semifinals
5	UE Red Warriors (H)	9	5	.643	2	
6	UST Growling Tigers	5	9	.357	6	
7	UP Fighting Maroons	1	13	.071 (Note: Head-to-head record: UP 1–1 Adamson (UP +9))	10	
8	Adamson Soaring Falcons	1	13	.071	10	

Source: ABS-CBN Sports
Rules for classification: 1) winning percentage; 2) if tied for #2 or #4, one-game playoff; 3) head-to-head record; 4) head-to-head point differential; 5) overall point differential
(H) Hosts

==== Match-up results ====
	Round 1							Round 2						
Team ╲ Game	1	2	3	4	5	6	7	8	9	10	11	12	13	14
AdU	Ateneo school colors	UE school colors	UST school colors	NU school colors	La Salle school colors	UP school colors	FEU school colors	UST school colors	NU school colors	UE school colors	La Salle school colors	FEU school colors	Ateneo school colors	UP school colors
ADMU	Adamson school colors	La Salle school colors	UP school colors	NU school colors	FEU school colors	UST school colors	UE school colors	La Salle school colors	UE school colors	NU school colors	UST school colors	UP school colors	Adamson school colors	FEU school colors
DLSU	FEU school colors	Ateneo school colors	NU school colors	UE school colors	Adamson school colors	UP school colors	UST school colors	Ateneo school colors	UP school colors	FEU school colors	Adamson school colors	UST school colors	UE school colors	NU school colors
FEU	La Salle school colors	UST school colors	UP school colors	UE school colors	Ateneo school colors	NU school colors	Adamson school colors	NU school colors	UST school colors	La Salle school colors	UP school colors	Adamson school colors	UE school colors	Ateneo school colors
NU	UST school colors	UP school colors	La Salle school colors	Ateneo school colors	Adamson school colors	UE school colors	FEU school colors	FEU school colors	Adamson school colors	Ateneo school colors	UE school colors	UP school colors	UST school colors	La Salle school colors
UE	UP school colors	Adamson school colors	La Salle school colors	FEU school colors	NU school colors	Ateneo school colors	UST school colors	UP school colors	Ateneo school colors	Adamson school colors	NU school colors	FEU school colors	La Salle school colors	UST school colors
UP	UE school colors	NU school colors	Ateneo school colors	FEU school colors	UST school colors	La Salle school colors	Adamson school colors	UE school colors	La Salle school colors	UST school colors	FEU school colors	Ateneo school colors	NU school colors	Adamson school colors
UST	NU school colors	FEU school colors	Adamson school colors	UP school colors	Ateneo school colors	La Salle school colors	UE school colors	Adamson school colors	FEU school colors	UP school colors	Ateneo school colors	La Salle school colors	NU school colors	UE school colors

= Win; = OT win; = Loss; = OT loss

==== Scores ====
Team	AdU	ADMU	DLSU	FEU	NU	UE	UP	UST
Adamson Soaring Falcons		57–79	48–67	62–71	25–62	72–99	64–77	49–50
Ateneo Blue Eagles	67–52		97–86	81–78	60–64	93–91*	86–75	63–61
De La Salle Green Archers	66–57	88–86		77–82	57–55	60–58	74–53	83–70
FEU Tamaraws	90–73	64–68*	74–70		71–62	73–63	85–71	67–69
NU Bulldogs	71–50	76–66	56–68	70–74*		57–55	70–59	59–40
UE Red Warriors	72–59	73–78	68–66	94–71	64–55		87–59	72–62
UP Fighting Maroons	63–67	69–70	65–86	69–75	51–66	48–68		57–73
UST Growling Tigers	61–59	58–69	60–67	55–66	64–75	73–78	77–65	

Legend: Blue = left column team win; Red = top row team win.
Matches with lighter background shading were decided after overtime.

=== Fourth seed playoff ===
ABS-CBN Sports and Action

September 20
4:00 p.m.

4th seed

UE Red Warriors	49–51	NU Bulldogs
Scoring by quarter: 14–15, 7–11, 10–12, 18–13
Pts: Roi Sumang 19; Rebs: Charles Mammie 14; Asts: Irvin Alberto 3		Pts: Glenn Khobuntin 12; Rebs: Troy Rosario 9 Asts: Paolo Javelona 6
NU advances to the Final Four

Smart Araneta Coliseum, Quezon City

=== Second seed playoff ===
ABS-CBN Sports and Action

September 21
4:00 p.m.

2nd seed

FEU Tamaraws	65–60	De La Salle Green Archers
Scoring by quarter: 15–12, 17–12, 21–26, 12–10
Pts: Mike Tolomia 19; Rebs: Mac Belo 10; Asts: Pogoy, Inigo, 3 each		Pts: Jason Perkins 15; Rebs: Jason Perkins 13; Asts: Jason Perkins 3
FEU wins the twice–to–beat advantage

Mall of Asia Arena, Pasay

=== Bracket ===
Semifinals (Top 2 twice-to-beat)
1	Ateneo	74	63
4	NU	78	65
2	FEU	73	67
3	La Salle	94	64

Finals (Best-of-three playoff)
4	NU	70	62	75
2	FEU	75	47	59

=== Semifinals ===
In the semifinals, the higher seed has the twice-to-beat advantage, where they only have to win once, while their opponents twice, to progress.

==== (1) Ateneo vs. (4) NU ====
The Ateneo Blue Eagles had the twice-to-beat advantage.

ABS-CBN Sports and Action

September 24
4:00 p.m.

Ateneo Blue Eagles	74–78	NU Bulldogs
Scoring by quarter: 14–24, 18–20, 18–16, 24–18
Pts: Kiefer Ravena 24; Rebs: Chris Newsome 7 Asts: Chris Newsome 4		Pts: Jay-Jay Alejandro 20; Rebs: Rosario, Aroga, 13 each Asts: Jay-Jay Alejandro 4

Smart Araneta Coliseum, Quezon City

ABS-CBN Sports and Action

October 1
2:00 p.m.

Ateneo Blue Eagles	63–65	NU Bulldogs
Scoring by quarter: 8–12, 19–20, 20–14, 16–19
Pts: Chris Newsome 22; Rebs: Chris Newsome 6 Asts: K. Ravena, Elorde 7 each		Pts: Alfred Aroga 14; Rebs: Alfred Aroga 12; Asts: 4 players, 2 each
NU wins series in two games

Smart Araneta Coliseum, Quezon City

==== (2) FEU vs. (3) La Salle ====
The FEU Tamaraws had the twice-to-beat advantage after beating the De La Salle Green Archers in the playoff for the #2 seed, which led to a virtual best-of-three playoff series.

ABS-CBN Sports and Action

September 27
4:00 p.m.

FEU Tamaraws	73–94	De La Salle Green Archers
Scoring by quarter: 14–24, 13–10, 20–29, 26–31
Pts: Mac Belo 32; Rebs: Tolomia, Cruz, 7 each Asts: Mike Tolomia 4		Pts: Jeron Teng 25; Rebs: Jason Perkins 12; Asts: Vosotros, Perkins, 4 each

Mall of Asia Arena, Pasay

ABS-CBN Sports and Action

October 1
6:00 p.m.

FEU Tamaraws	67–64	De La Salle Green Archers
Scoring by quarter: 24–17, 18–20, 9–10, 16–17
Pts: Mac Belo 23; Rebs: RR Pogoy 11; Asts: Mike Tolomia 6		Pts: Jeron Teng 13; Rebs: Jason Perkins 12; Asts: Jeron Teng 6
FEU wins series in two games

Smart Araneta Coliseum, Quezon City

=== Finals ===
This was the first time since 1993 that neither Ateneo nor La Salle featured in the UAAP Finals.

ABS-CBN

October 4
3:30 p.m.

FEU Tamaraws	75–70	NU Bulldogs
Scoring by quarter: 14–15, 21–23, 25–12, 15–20
Pts: Mike Tolomia 15; Rebs: 3 players, 7 each Asts: 3 players, 3 each		Pts: Alfred Aroga 17; Rebs: Aroga, Rosario, 8 each Asts: Paolo Javelona 4

Mall of Asia Arena, Pasay
Attendance: 17,065

ABS-CBN Sports and Action

October 8
4:00 p.m.

FEU Tamaraws	47–62	NU Bulldogs
Scoring by quarter: 6–18, 12–8, 12–17, 17–19
Pts: Mac Belo 17; Rebs: RR Pogoy 9 Asts: Achie Inigo 3		Pts: Troy Rosario 19; Rebs: Troy Rosario 14; Asts: Paolo Javelona 4

Smart Araneta Coliseum, Quezon City
Attendance: 24,896

ABS-CBN Sports and Action

October 15
3:30 p.m.

FEU Tamaraws	59–75	NU Bulldogs
Scoring by quarter: 18–20, 8–10, 18–25, 15–20
Pts: Mike Tolomia 23; Rebs: Mac Belo 13; Asts: Mike Tolomia 3		Pts: Alfred Aroga 24; Rebs: Alfred Aroga 18; Asts: Paolo Javelona 5
NU wins series 2–1

Smart Araneta Coliseum, Quezon City
Attendance: 25,138

- Finals Most Valuable Player: Alfred Aroga (NU Bulldogs)

Game 3 of the series holds the pre-COVID pandemic basketball attendance record of Smart Araneta Coliseum. This was later to be surpassed by Game 3 of the UAAP Season 86 (2023) finals.

=== Awards ===
UAAP Season 77 men's basketball champions
NU Bulldogs
Second title

- Most Valuable Player: Kiefer Ravena (Ateneo Blue Eagles)
- Rookie of the Year: Arvin Tolentino (Ateneo Blue Eagles)
- Mythical Five:
  - Kiefer Ravena (Ateneo Blue Eagles)
  - Chris Newsome (Ateneo Blue Eagles)
  - Jeron Teng (De La Salle Green Archers)
  - Mac Belo (FEU Tamaraws)
  - Karim Abdul (UST Growling Tigers)

=== Broadcast notes ===
==== Television ====
Simulcast over ABS-CBN Channel 2 (Game 1), ABS-CBN Sports and Action (Games 2 and 3), The Filipino Channel, and Balls HD with replays on ABS-CBN Sports and Action and Balls.

Game	Play-by-play	Analyst
Game 1	Boom Gonzales	TJ Manotoc
Game 2	Boom Gonzales	TJ Manotoc
Game 3	Boom Gonzales	TJ Manotoc

==== Radio ====
Simulcast over DZMM Radio Patrol 630.

Game	Play-by-play	Analyst
Game 1	Noel Zarate	Allan Gregorio
Game 2	Noel Zarate	Allan Gregorio
Game 3	Noel Zarate	Allan Gregorio

== Women's tournament ==
=== Elimination round ===
==== Team standings ====
Pos	Team	W	L	PCT	GB	Qualification
1	NU Lady Bulldogs	14	0	1.000	—	Thrice-to-beat in the Finals (Note: As NU won all of their elimination round games, the stepladder format will be used instead of the regular Final Four format.)
2	De La Salle Lady Archers	10	4	.714	4	Twice-to-beat in stepladder round 2
3	UST Growling Tigresses	8	6	.571 (Note: Head-to-head record: UST 1–1 FEU (UST +4))	6	Proceed to stepladder round 1
4	FEU Lady Tamaraws	8	6	.571	6	Proceed to stepladder round 1
5	Ateneo Lady Eagles	7	7	.500	7	
6	Adamson Lady Falcons	6	8	.429	8	
7	UE Lady Warriors (H)	3	11	.214	11	
8	UP Lady Maroons	0	14	.000	14	

Source: ABS-CBN Sports
Rules for classification: 1) winning percentage; 2) if tied for #2 or #4, one-game playoff; 3) head-to-head record; 4) head-to-head point differential; 5) overall point differential
(H) Hosts

==== Match-up results ====
	Round 1							Round 2						
Team ╲ Game	1	2	3	4	5	6	7	8	9	10	11	12	13	14
Adamson	NU school colors	La Salle school colors	FEU school colors	UP school colors	UE school colors	Ateneo school colors	UST school colors	La Salle school colors	NU school colors	UP school colors	FEU school colors	UE school colors	Ateneo school colors	UST school colors
Ateneo	UP school colors	FEU school colors	UST school colors	NU school colors	La Salle school colors	Adamson school colors	UE school colors	UP school colors	La Salle school colors	UE school colors	NU school colors	UST school colors	Adamson school colors	FEU school colors
La Salle	UST school colors	Adamson school colors	UP school colors	UE school colors	Ateneo school colors	FEU school colors	NU school colors	Adamson school colors	UST school colors	Ateneo school colors	UE school colors	UP school colors	FEU school colors	NU school colors
FEU	UE school colors	Ateneo school colors	Adamson school colors	UST school colors	NU school colors	La Salle school colors	UP school colors	UE school colors	NU school colors	UP school colors	Adamson school colors	La Salle school colors	UST school colors	Ateneo school colors
NU	Adamson school colors	UST school colors	Ateneo school colors	UE school colors	FEU school colors	UP school colors	La Salle school colors	UST school colors	Adamson school colors	FEU school colors	Ateneo school colors	UE school colors	UP school colors	La Salle school colors
UE	FEU school colors	UP school colors	La Salle school colors	NU school colors	Adamson school colors	UST school colors	Ateneo school colors	FEU school colors	UST school colors	Ateneo school colors	La Salle school colors	NU school colors	Adamson school colors	UP school colors
UP	Ateneo school colors	UE school colors	La Salle school colors	Adamson school colors	UST school colors	NU school colors	FEU school colors	Ateneo school colors	Adamson school colors	FEU school colors	UST school colors	La Salle school colors	NU school colors	UE school colors
UST	La Salle school colors	NU school colors	Ateneo school colors	FEU school colors	UP school colors	UE school colors	Adamson school colors	NU school colors	La Salle school colors	UE school colors	UP school colors	Ateneo school colors	FEU school colors	Adamson school colors

= Win; = OT win; = Loss; = OT loss

==== Scores ====
Team	AdU	ADMU	DLSU	FEU	NU	UE	UP	UST
Adamson Lady Falcons		59–47	42–50	48–47	46–62	53–54*	57–44	47–59
Ateneo Lady Eagles	51–48		39–48	58–55	50–59	50–35	54–42	54–55
De La Salle Lady Archers	50–55	53–37		46–43	55–77	64–56	66–31	56–50
FEU Lady Tamaraws	66–62	45–34	48–43		40–56	52–37	65–61	57–56
NU Lady Bulldogs	71–60	74–52	75–71	67–50		81–59	57–44	62–60
UE Lady Warriors	68–80	56–70	52–78	50–59	66–70		58–47	54–69
UP Lady Maroons	47–59	49–56	40–62	54–59	44–64	60–69		43–44
UST Tigresses	74–63	54–60	63–69	73–68	68–73	54–36	88–75	

Legend: Blue = left column team win; Red = top row team win.
Matches with lighter background shading were decided after overtime.

=== Bracket ===
Stepladder round 1 (Single-elimination)
3	UST	61
4	FEU	62

Stepladder round 2 (No. 2 twice-to-beat)
2	La Salle	56	80
4	FEU	61	81*

Finals (No. 1 thrice-to-beat)
1	NU	80	59
4	FEU	58	48

*Overtime

=== Stepladder semifinals ===
==== (3) UST vs. (4) FEU ====
ABS-CBN Sports and Action

September 21
1:30 p.m.

UST Growling Tigresses	61–62	FEU Lady Tamaraws
Scoring by quarter: 12–11, 19–13, 17–17, 13–21
FEU advances to the stepladder semifinals round 2

Mall of Asia Arena, Pasay

==== (2) La Salle vs. (4) FEU ====
The De La Salle Lady Archers has the twice-to-beat advantage.

September 25
11:00 a.m.

De La Salle Lady Archers	56–61	FEU Lady Tamaraws
Scoring by quarter: 7–6, 22–11, 16–20, 11–24

Filoil Flying V Arena, San Juan

ABS-CBN Sports and Action

September 27
01:30 p.m.

De La Salle Lady Archers	80–81 (OT)	FEU Lady Tamaraws
Scoring by quarter: 15–14, 21–16, 14–14, 21–27, Overtime: 9–10
FEU wins series in two games

Mall of Asia Arena, Pasay

=== Finals ===
The NU Lady Bulldogs have the thrice-to-beat advantage, while the FEU Lady Tamaraws have the twice-to-win disadvantage.

ABS-CBN Sports and Action

October 1, 2014
11:00 am

NU Lady Bulldogs	80–58	FEU Lady Tamaraws
Scoring by quarter: 24–9, 20–7, 16–23, 20–19

Smart Araneta Coliseum, Quezon City

ABS-CBN Sports and Action

October 4, 2014
12:30 pm

NU Lady Bulldogs	59–48	FEU Lady Tamaraws
Scoring by quarter: 13–19, 16–11, 11–6, 19–12
NU wins series in two games

Mall of Asia Arena, Pasay

- Finals Most Valuable Player: Gemma Miranda (NU Lady Bulldogs)

=== Awards ===
UAAP Season 77 women's basketball champions
NU Lady Bulldogs
First title

- Most Valuable Player: Afril Bernardino (NU Lady Bulldogs)
- Rookie of the Year: Ria Joy Nabalan (NU Lady Bulldogs)
- Mythical Five:
  - Danica Therese Jose (Ateneo Lady Eagles)
  - Afril Bernardino (NU Lady Bulldogs)
  - Shelley Anne Gupilan (NU Lady Bulldogs)
  - Gemma Miranda (NU Lady Bulldogs)
  - Lore Rivera (UST Growling Tigresses)

=== Broadcast notes ===
Game	Play-by-play	Analyst
Game 1		
Game 2	Anton Roxas	Marco Benitez

== Juniors' tournament ==
=== Elimination round ===
==== Team standings ====
Pos	Team	W	L	PCT	GB	Qualification
1	Ateneo Blue Eaglets	14	0	1.000	—	Thrice-to-beat in the Finals (Note: As Ateneo won all of their elimination round games, the stepladder format will be used instead of the regular Final Four format.)
2	NUNS Bullpups	9	5	.643 (Note: Head-to-head record: NSNU 3–1, Adamson 2–2, DLSZ 1–3; second-seed playoff: NSNU 72–45 Adamson)	5	Twice-to-beat in stepladder round 2
3	Adamson Baby Falcons	9	5	.643	5	Proceed to stepladder round 1
4	Zobel Junior Archers	9	5	.643	5	Proceed to stepladder round 1
5	FEU–D Baby Tamaraws	8	6	.571	6	
6	UST Tiger Cubs	5	9	.357	9	
7	UPIS Junior Fighting Maroons	2	12	.143	12	
8	UE Junior Red Warriors (H)	0	14	.000	14	

Source: ABS-CBN Sports
Rules for classification: 1) winning percentage; 2) if tied for #2 or #4, one-game playoff; 3) head-to-head record; 4) head-to-head point differential; 5) overall point differential
(H) Hosts

==== Match-up results ====
	Round 1							Round 2						
Team ╲ Game	1	2	3	4	5	6	7	8	9	10	11	12	13	14
AdU	UST school colors	La Salle school colors	UE school colors	FEU school colors	Ateneo school colors	NU school colors	UP school colors	UP school colors	Ateneo school colors	UE school colors	FEU school colors	La Salle school colors	NU school colors	UST school colors
AdMU	La Salle school colors	UST school colors	FEU school colors	UP school colors	Adamson school colors	UE school colors	NU school colors	La Salle school colors	Adamson school colors	FEU school colors	UST school colors	UP school colors	UE school colors	NU school colors
DLSZ	Ateneo school colors	Adamson school colors	NU school colors	UE school colors	UST school colors	UP school colors	FEU school colors	Ateneo school colors	UP school colors	NU school colors	UE school colors	Adamson school colors	UST school colors	FEU school colors
FEU	NU school colors	UP school colors	Ateneo school colors	Adamson school colors	UE school colors	UST school colors	La Salle school colors	NU school colors	UE school colors	Ateneo school colors	Adamson school colors	UST school colors	UP school colors	La Salle school colors
NU	FEU school colors	UE school colors	La Salle school colors	UST school colors	UP school colors	Adamson school colors	Ateneo school colors	FEU school colors	UST school colors	La Salle school colors	UP school colors	UE school colors	Adamson school colors	Ateneo school colors
UE	UP school colors	NU school colors	Adamson school colors	La Salle school colors	FEU school colors	Ateneo school colors	UST school colors	UST school colors	FEU school colors	Adamson school colors	La Salle school colors	NU school colors	Ateneo school colors	UP school colors
UPIS	UE school colors	FEU school colors	UST school colors	Ateneo school colors	NU school colors	La Salle school colors	Adamson school colors	Adamson school colors	La Salle school colors	UST school colors	NU school colors	Ateneo school colors	FEU school colors	UE school colors
UST	Adamson school colors	Ateneo school colors	UP school colors	NU school colors	La Salle school colors	FEU school colors	UE school colors	UE school colors	NU school colors	UP school colors	Ateneo school colors	FEU school colors	La Salle school colors	Adamson school colors

= Win; = OT win; = Loss; = OT loss

==== Scores ====
Team	AdU	ADMU	DLSZ	FEU	NU	UE	UPIS	UST
Adamson Baby Falcons		66–75	61–67	58–63	55–63	68–37	56–50	75–69
Ateneo Blue Eaglets	66–61		68–57	76–73*	66–64	84–60	87–65	82–70
Zobel Junior Archers	61–81	67–69		55–50	57–59	98–38	104–54	55–62
FEU-FERN Baby Tamaraws	39–63	52–78	58–60		66–71*	62–40	67–51	53–41
NSNU Bullpups	64–74	49–76	50–37	65–68**		83–38	84–64	71–44
UE Junior Warriors	42–78	77–101	66–77	55–81	52–75		54–67	65–77
UPIS Junior Maroons	52–76	66–83	41–78	52–60	55–81	93–65		48–60
UST Tiger Cubs	67–76	66–84	53–66	48–57	51–49	77–67	61–55	

Legend: Blue = left column team win; Red = top row team win.
Matches with lighter background shading were decided after overtime.

=== Second seed playoff ===
The winner advances to the second round of the stepladder semifinals with the twice-to-beat advantage; the loser proceeds to the first round.

February 3

Adamson Baby Falcons	45–72	NUNS Bullpups

Blue Eagle Gym, Quezon City

=== Bracket ===
Stepladder round 1 (Single-elimination)
3	Adamson	81
4	DLSZ	87

Stepladder round 2 (No. 2 twice-to-beat)
2	NU	61
4	DLSZ	45

Finals (No. 1 thrice-to-beat)
1	Ateneo	72	78	90
2	NU	76	76	73

=== Stepladder semifinals ===
==== (3) Adamson vs. (4) DLSZ ====
This is a single-elimination game.

February 6

Adamson Baby Falcons	81–87	Zobel Junior Archers

Blue Eagle Gym, Quezon City

==== (2) NU vs. (4) DLSZ ====
The NU Bullpups have the twice-to-beat advantage.

February 9

NUNS Bullpups	61–45	Zobel Junior Archers
NU wins series in one game

Blue Eagle Gym, Quezon City

=== Finals ===
The Ateneo Blue Eaglets have the thrice-to-beat advantage; the NU Bullpups can lose the series by losing twice.

February 13

Ateneo Blue Eaglets	72–76	NUNS Bullpups

Filoil Flying V Arena, San Juan

February 17

Ateneo Blue Eaglets	78–76	NUNS Bullpups

Filoil Flying V Arena, San Juan

February 20

Ateneo Blue Eaglets	90–73	NUNS Bullpups
Ateneo wins series in three games

Filoil Flying V Arena, San Juan

- Finals Most Valuable Player: Jolo Mendoza (Ateneo Blue Eaglets)

=== Awards ===
UAAP Season 77 juniors' basketball champions
Ateneo Blue Eaglets
18th title

- Most Valuable Player: Michael Joseph Nieto (Ateneo Blue Eaglets)
- Rookie of the Year:
- Mythical Five:
  - Michael Joseph Nieto (Ateneo Blue Eaglets)
  - Joseph Matthew Nieto (Ateneo Blue Eaglets)
  - JD Frederick Tungcab (Adamson Baby Falcons)
  - Aljun Jay Melecio (Zobel Junior Archers)
  - Mark Anthony Dyke (NUNS Bullpups)

== Overall championship points ==
=== Seniors' division ===
Team	Men	Women	Total
National University	15	15	30
Far Eastern University	12	12	24
De La Salle University	10	10	20
Ateneo de Manila University	8	6	14
University of Santo Tomas	4	8	12
University of the East	6	2	8
Adamson University	1	4	5
University of the Philippines Diliman	2	1	3

=== Juniors' division ===
Team	Points
Ateneo de Manila University	15
Nazareth School of National University	12
De La Salle Zobel	10
Adamson University	8
Far Eastern University Diliman	6
University of Santo Tomas	4
University of the Philippines Integrated School	2
University of the East	1

Pts.	Ranking
15	Champion
12	2nd
10	3rd
8	4th
6	5th
4	6th
2	7th
1	8th
—	Did not join
WD	Withdrew

In case of a tie, the team with the higher position in any tournament is ranked higher. If both are still tied, they are listed by alphabetical order.

How rankings are determined:

- Ranks 5th to 8th determined by elimination round standings.
- Loser of the #1 vs #4 semifinal match-up is ranked 4th
- Loser of the #2 vs #3 semifinal match-up is ranked 3rd
- Loser of the finals is ranked 2nd
- Champion is ranked 1st

== See also ==
- NCAA Season 90 basketball tournaments

Preceded by Season 76 (2013)	UAAP basketball seasons Season 77 (2014)	Succeeded by Season 78 (2015)
