= 2014 UST Growling Tigers basketball team =

2014 UST Growling Tigers men's basketball

Record
- Elims rank: #6
- Final rank: #6
- 2014 record: 5–9
- Head coach: Bong dela Cruz (1st season)
- Assistant coaches: Estong Ballesteros; Senen Dueñas
- Captain: Aljon Mariano (5th season)

The 2014 UST Growling Tigers men's basketball team represented University of Santo Tomas in the 77th season of the University Athletic Association of the Philippines. The men's basketball tournament for the school year 2014-15 began on July 12, 2014, and the host school for the season was University of the East.

UST finished sixth at the end of the double round-robin eliminations with five games against nine losses. They had an average losing margin of 9.2 points and an average winning margin of 6.6 points per game.

The Tigers failed to qualify to the Final Four for the first time since Season 73 and after being in back-to-back Finals appearances the past two years.

Cameroonian center Karim Abdul made it to the Mythical team selection for the third straight year.

== Roster ==
UST Growling Tigers roster
Players
Coaches

Pos.	No.	Nat.	Name	Height	Year	High School
SF	5	(Philippines)	Kim Kaizen Lo	6'1" (1.85m)	5th	St. Jude Catholic School
PG	6	(Canada)	Sheak Jamil Sheriff, Jr.	5'9" (1.75m)	3rd	Loyola Catholic Secondary School
PF	7	(Philippines)	Kevin Ferrer	6'4" (1.93m)	4th	University of Santo Tomas
SG	8	(Philippines)	Eduardo Daquioag, Jr.	6'1" (1.85m)	4th	RTU Laboratory High School
PG	9	(Philippines)	Levi dela Cruz, II	5'7" (1.7m)	1st	Nazareth School of National University
SF	10	(Philippines)	Aljon Mariano (C)	6'3" (1.91m)	5th	San Beda College–Rizal
SF	11	(Philippines)	Regie Boy Basibas	6'3" (1.91m)	1st	Arellano University High School
PF	12	(Philippines)	Jon Cornelius Macasaet	6'3" (1.91m)	2nd	San Sebastian College-Recoletos
C	13	(Philippines)	Paulo Lorenzo Pe	6'4" (1.93m)	5th	Ateneo de Manila
PF	14	(Philippines)	Raymart Angelo Sablan	6'4" (1.93m)	1st	UP Integrated School
C	15	(Philippines)	Jeepy Faundo	6'6" (1.98m)	2nd	José Rizal University
SF	16	(Philippines)	Alfren Gayosa	6'2" (1.88m)	1st	San Sebastian College-Recoletos
PG	17	(Philippines)	Henri Lorenzo Subido	5'9" (1.75m)	1st	De La Salle Santiago Zobel School
SG	18	(Philippines)	Louie Philippe Vigil	6'3" (1.91m)	3rd	José Rizal University
SF	19	(Philippines)	Kent Jefferson Lao	6'4" (1.93m)	3rd	Saint Stephen's High School
C	20	(Cameroon)	Karim Abdul	6'6" (1.98m)	4th	Sta. Clara International Academy

Head coach

- (Philippines) Segundo dela Cruz, III

Assistant coach(es)

- Ernesto Ballesteros
- Senen Dueñas
- Alvin Grey
- Ma. Genevieve Francisco

Strength & conditioning coach(es)

- Emmanuel Calipes
- Kris Anthony Agarao

Team manager

- Rudy Yu
- Christian Calvin Cheng

Legend

- (C) Team captain
- Injured

- Roster

=== Depth chart ===
Pos.	Starting 5	Bench 1	Bench 2	Bench 3
C	Abdul	Pe	Faundo
PF	Lao	Ferrer	Macasaet	Sablan
SF	Mariano	Lo	Gayosa
SG	Vigil	Daquioag	Basibas
PG	Sheriff	Subido	Dela Cruz

== Roster changes ==
=== Subtractions ===
Pos.	No.	Nat.	Player	Height	Year	High school	Notes
PG	8	(Philippines)	Robin Allan Tan	5' 7"	4th	Xavier School	Relegated to Team B
SG	9	(Philippines)	Clark Daniel Oliver Bautista	5' 9"	5th	Benedictine International School	Graduated
PG	11	(Philippines)	Edcor Marata	5' 10"	3rd	University of the Visayas	Transferred to Lyceum of the Philippines University
SF	14	(Philippines)	Brian James So	6' 2"	2nd	Colegio de San Juan de Letran	Out on injury
C	15	(Philippines)	Roberto Hainga	6' 7"	4th	Iloilo Central Commercial High School	Graduated
SG	16	(Philippines)	Jeric Allen Teng	6' 2"	5th	Xavier School	Graduated

=== Additions ===
Pos.	No.	Nat.	Player	Height	Year	High school	Notes
PG	9	(Philippines)	Levi dela Cruz, II	5' 7"	1st	Nazareth School of National University	Promoted from Team B
SF	11	(Philippines)	Regie Boy Basibas	6' 3"	1st	Arellano University High School	Promoted from Team B
PF	14	(Philippines)	Raymart Angelo Sablan	6' 4"	1st	UP Integrated School	Rookie
SF	16	(Philippines)	Alfren Gayosa	6' 2"	1st	San Sebastian College-Recoletos	Rookie
PG	17	(Philippines)	Henri Lorenzo Subido	5' 9"	1st	De La Salle Santiago Zobel School	Rookie
SF	18	(Philippines)	Louie Philippe Vigil	6' 3"	3rd	José Rizal University	Returning from Season 75

=== Recruiting class ===
Name	Pos.	Height	High school	Hometown	Commit date
Levi dela Cruz	PG	5' 7"	Nazareth School of National University	Davao City	Apr 2014
Levi dela Cruz	2013 National Basketball Training Center Top 30 player				
Alfren Gayosa	SF	6' 2"	San Sebastian College-Recoletos	Manila	17 Apr 2014
Alfren Gayosa	2014 National Basketball Training Center Top 30 player				
Renzo Subido	PG	5' 9"	De La Salle Santiago Zobel School	Mandaluyong	2 Jun 2014
Renzo Subido	2014 National Basketball Training Center Top 30 player				
Sources: 1234

== Coaching changes ==
Bong dela Cruz replaced Pido Jarencio as the head coach of the Growling Tigers senior men's basketball team on March 27, 2014. The coaching change was announced by Institute of Physical Education and Athletics (IPEA) secretary and UAAP board representative Ms. Gilda Kamus following Jarencio's resignation in January.

Jarencio, the Growling Tigers coach for eight years who led the team to the UAAP title in his rookie year in 2006, signed a two-year contract as head coach of GlobalPort in the Philippine Basketball Association.

Dela Cruz was a point guard of the Glowing Goldies in 1988 before he transferred to the Adamson Falcons to join former high school teammates Giovanni Pineda, Gerardo Hipolito, Manuel Cucio, Marlou Aquino, and Christopher de Leon. Together with EJ Feihl, the Golden Nuggets juniors team was once regarded as the tallest basketball team in the country.

After his college playing days, he became a coach in the Philippine Basketball League, the National Basketball Conference, and Liga Pilipinas. He was hired as an assistant coach of the Growling Tigers beginning in Season 75. Aside from UST, he was also an assistant coach for the Enderun Titans under former FEU Tamaraws player Pipo Noundou.

== Injuries ==
Fourth year forward Kevin Ferrer's season was cut short after only eight games after fracturing his left hand during practice prior to their second-round match against the FEU Tamaraws.

Karim Abdul missed their game against the UE Red Warriors in the first round after being confined in the hospital from dehydration due to a viral infection.

== Schedule and results ==
=== Preseason tournament ===
Preseason game log

20th Fr. Martin Cup Summer basketball tournament: 7–1
Game	Date • Time	Opponent	Result	Record	High points	High rebounds	High assists	Location
1	Apr 22	DCTI Senators	W 85–68	1–0	Vigil (22)			St. Placid Gym; Manila
2	May 1	St. Clare College Saints	W 61–58	2–0	Tied (12)			Trinity University of Asia, Quezon City
3	May 5	San Beda Red Lions	W	3–0				
4 (Note: Won by forfeit)	May 7	San Sebastian Stags	W	4–0				St. Placid Gym; Manila
5	May 22	U-18 National team	W 79–76	5–0	Vigil (21)			Trinity University of Asia, Quezon City
6	Jun 2	Lyceum Pirates	W 71–69	6–0	Lo (15)			St. Placid Gym; Manila
7	Jun 7	Enderun Colleges Titans; Semifinal round	W 74–66	7–0	Vigil (18)			Trinity University of Asia, Quezon City
8	Jun 8	Perpetual Altas; Championship game	L 56–65	7–1	Abdul (17)			Trinity University of Asia, Quezon City

(#) Tournament seedings in parentheses.
All times are in UTC+08:00.

=== UAAP games ===
Elimination games were played in a double round-robin format and all of UST's games were televised on ABS-CBN Sports and Action.

UAAP Season 77 game log

Elimination round: 5–9
Game	Date • Time	Opponent	Result	Record	High points	High rebounds	High assists	Location
1	Jul 13 • 4:00 pm	NU Bulldogs	L 40–59	0–1	Abdul (11)	Mariano (6)	Tied (1)	Smart Araneta Coliseum; Quezon City
	Jul 16 • 2:00 pm	UE Red Warriors	Postponed due to Typhoon Glenda					Mall of Asia Arena; Pasay
2	Jul 20 • 4:00 pm	FEU Tamaraws	W 69–67	1–1	Ferrer (18)	Tied (4)	Vigil (4)	Smart Araneta Coliseum; Quezon City
3	Jul 26 • 2:00 pm	Adamson Soaring Falcons	W 50–49	2–1	Vigil (11)	Abdul (7)	Mariano (2)	Mall of Asia Arena; Pasay
4	Aug 2 • 2:00 pm	UP Fighting Maroons	W 73–57	3–1	Abdul (18)	Abdul (8)	Mariano (4)	Smart Araneta Coliseum; Quezon City
5	Aug 6 • 4:00 pm	Ateneo Blue Eagles	L 61–63	3–2	Abdul (19)	Abdul (12)	Tied (3)	Smart Araneta Coliseum; Quezon City
6	Aug 10 • 4:00 pm	De La Salle Green Archers	L 70–83	3–3	Mariano (20)	Sheriff (7)	Tied (4)	Mall of Asia Arena; Pasay
7	Aug 13 • 2:00 pm	UE Red Warriors; End of R1 of eliminations	L 62–72	3–4	Mariano (21)	Mariano (10)	Tied (3)	Smart Araneta Coliseum; Quezon City
8	Aug 16 • 2:00 pm	Adamson Soaring Falcons	W 61–59	4–4	Vigil (13)	Mariano (12)	Tied (3)	Smart Araneta Coliseum; Quezon City
9	Aug 23 • 4:00 pm	FEU Tamaraws	L 55–66	4–5	Abdul (24)	Abdul (16)	Sheriff (7)	Mall of Asia Arena; Pasay
10	Aug 27 • 2:00 pm	UP Fighting Maroons	W 77–65	5–5	Abdul (21)	Basibas (18)	Subido (5)	Mall of Asia Arena; Pasay
11	Aug 30 • 4:00 pm	Ateneo Blue Eagles	L 58–69	5–6	Abdul (17)	Abdul (13)	Tied (2)	Smart Araneta Coliseum; Quezon City
12	Sep 6 • 4:00 pm	De La Salle Green Archers	L 60–67	5–7	Daquioag (19)	Abdul (14)	Sheriff (3)	Mall of Asia Arena; Pasay
13	Sep 10 • 4:00 pm	NU Bulldogs	L 64–75	5–8	Abdul (15)	Abdul (9)	Daquioag (5)	Smart Araneta Coliseum; Quezon City
14	Sep 16 • 4:00 pm	UE Red Warriors; End of R2 of eliminations	L 73–78	5–9	Mariano (18)	Lo (8)	Vigil (7)	Smart Araneta Coliseum; Quezon City

(#) Tournament seedings in parentheses.
All times are in UTC+08:00.
Source: HumbleBola

== UAAP statistics ==
Player	GP	GS	MPG	FGM	FGA	FG%	3PM	3PA	3P%	FTM	FTA	FT%	RPG	APG	SPG	BPG	TOV	PPG
Karim Abdul	13	12	30.0	61	139	43.9	0	5	0.0	65	90	72.2	9.2	1.5	1.2	1.7	3.8	14.4
Aljon Mariano	14	9	26.7	57	167	34.1	13	42	31.0	27	40	67.5	5.5	1.4	0.5	0.2	2.7	11.0
Louie Vigil	13	10	26.5	49	133	36.8	13	60	21.7	25	44	56.8	4.2	2.1	0.4	0.5	2.4	10.5
Kevin Ferrer	8	6	28.2	22	91	24.2	8	46	17.4	25	31	80.6	5.3	1.4	1.0	0.3	2.6	9.6
Ed Daquioag	12	7	22.5	32	91	35.2	8	38	21.1	14	19	73.7	2.6	1.5	1.3	0.4	2.4	7.2
Jon Sheriff	14	13	24.7	27	62	43.5	0	2	0.0	4	8	50.0	4.1	2.5	1.6	0.0	2.4	4.1
Kent Lao	13	10	14.0	17	41	41.5	6	22	27.3	6	12	50.0	2.0	0.4	0.0	0.2	0.5	3.5
Renzo Subido	14	0	16.5	15	52	28.8	9	34	26.5	8	11	72.7	1.5	1.0	0.5	0.0	0.9	3.4
Regie Boy Basibas	10	0	8.8	8	18	44.4	1	2	50.0	6	13	46.2	2.9	0.4	0.1	0.1	0.8	2.3
Jeepy Faundo	4	0	6.8	1	5	20.0	0	0	0.0	5	6	83.3	2.0	0.0	0.0	0.3	0.0	1.8
Paolo Pe	14	2	9.0	9	23	39.1	0	0	0.0	2	8	25.0	1.6	0.0	0.0	0.2	0.2	1.4
Kim Lo	14	1	8.8	8	31	25.8	0	9	0.0	4	10	40.0	1.7	0.9	0.1	0.0	0.6	1.4
Alfren Gayosa	10	0	4.9	3	10	30.0	1	5	20.0	5	11	45.5	1.2	0.1	0.2	0.1	0.6	1.2
Joco Macasaet	5	0	1.4	0	0	0.0	0	0	0.0	0	0	0.0	0.2	0.0	0.0	0.0	0.0	0.0
Levi dela Cruz	4	0	2.8	0	2	0.0	0	2	0.0	0	0	0.0	0.0	0.3	0.0	0.0	0.3	0.0
Gelo Sablan	2	0	2.0	0	1	0.0	0	1	0.0	0	0	0.0	1.0	0.0	0.0	0.0	0.0	0.0
Total	14		40.0	309	866	35.7	59	268	22.0	196	303	64.7	39.2	12.0	6.1	3.4	18.1	62.4
Opponents	14		40.0	329	830	39.6	66	262	25.2	205	309	66.3	41.1	13.1	4.1	1.7	19.8	66.4

Legend
GP	Games played	GS	Games started	MPG	Minutes per game
FGM	Field-goal made	FGA	Field-goal attempts	FG%	Field-goal percentage
3PM	3-point field-goal made	3PA	3-point field-goal attempts	3P%	3-point field-goal percentage
FTM	Free-throw made	FTA	Free-throw attempts	FT%	Free-throw percentage
RPG	Rebounds per game	APG	Assists per game	SPG	Steals per game
BPG	Blocks per game	TOV	Turnovers per game	PPG	Points per game

Source: HumbleBola

== Awards ==
Name	Award	Date	Ref.
Team	Fr. Martin Cup runners-up	8 Jun 2014	
Karim Abdul	Mythical team	8 Oct 2014	
Karim Abdul	KFC Double-Double Delivery award	8 Oct 2014	

== Players drafted into the PBA ==
Aljon Mariano was picked 16th overall in the second round of the 2015 PBA draft by the Tim Cone-led Barangay Ginebra San Miguel team on August 23, 2015.

Year	Round	Pick	Overall	Player	PBA team
2015	2	4	16	Aljon Mariano	Barangay Ginebra San Miguel
