= UAAP Season 77 =

University athletic year

- "Unity in Excellence"
- Host school: University of the East

Overall
- Seniors: University of Santo Tomas
- Juniors: University of Santo Tomas

Seniors' champions
| Sport | | Men | Women |
| Basketball | | NU | NU |
| Volleyball | | Ateneo | Ateneo |
| Beach volleyball | | NU | UST |
| Football | | FEU | FEU |
| Baseball | | Ateneo | N/A |
| Softball | | N/A | Adamson |
| Fencing | | UE | UE |
| Swimming | | Ateneo | Ateneo |
| Badminton | | NU | UP |
| Chess | | La Salle | FEU |
| Judo | | UST | UST |
| Table tennis | | La Salle | La Salle |
| Tennis | | NU | NU |
| Track and field | | FEU | UST |
| Taekwondo | | UST | UP |
- Poomsae: UP (Coed)
- Cheerdance: NU (Ex - Coed)
- Street dance: UP (Ex - Coed)

Juniors' champions
| Sport | | Boys | Girls |
| Basketball | | Ateneo | N/A |
| Volleyball | | UE | NU |
| Beach volleyball | | FEU | N/A |
| Football | | FEU | |
| Baseball | | UE | UE |
| Softball | | Ateneo | UST |
| Fencing | | NU | N/A |
| Swimming | | Ateneo | |
| Badminton | | UE | |
| Chess | | UE | |
| Judo | | UE | |
- (NT) = No tournament; (DS) = Demonstration Sport; (Ex) = Exhibition;

UAAP Season 77 is the 2014–15 athletic year of the University Athletic Association of the Philippines (UAAP). The season host is the University of the East with Carmelita Mateo as president. Eight universities are competing in fifteen sports to vie for the general championship. Each sporting event is hosted by a school.

Some of these sporting events are aired live or on a delayed telecast by ABS-CBN Sports+Action and ABS-CBN Channel 2. All the men's basketball games and the women's volleyball games are aired live by ABS-CBN Sports, the former for the fifteenth consecutive year following the renewal of the contract for the broadcast of the games and the latter since Season 69 (2006−07).

== Opening ceremony ==
Season 77 kicked off at 12:30 P.M. on Saturday, July 12, 2014 at the Smart Araneta Coliseum with University of the East (UE) as the host school. This year's theme was "Unity in Excellence". Eight huge spheres were hanged from the ceiling of the coliseum representing the different universities united in the pursuit of excellence.

The opening ceremony featured a parade of the "constellations," with students portraying legendary figures from Greek mythology such as Zeus, Andromeda, Pegasus and Orion. Team captains of the basketball teams of the eight participating schools were introduced riding on Segways. UE Red Warriors team captain Bong Galanza led the oath of sportsmanship.

A basketball double header followed after the opening ceremonies. Host school UE took on the UP Fighting Maroons, while the defending champion De La Salle Green Archers was pitted against the FEU Tamaraws.

== Sports calendar ==
First semester events
(July–October)
July
Basketball (Seniors' division)
Volleyball (Juniors' division)
August
Badminton
Beach volleyball
September
Judo
Table tennis
Taekwondo
Poomsae
Cheerdance
October
Swimming

Second semester events
(November–March)
November
Basketball (Juniors' division)
Football (Seniors' division)
Volleyball (Seniors' division)
December
Fencing
Track and field
January
Baseball
Softball
Football (Juniors' division)
Tennis
Chess

== Basketball ==
=== Seniors division ===
The UAAP Season 77 seniors division basketball tournament began on July 12, 2014. The tournament main venue was the Smart Araneta Coliseum in Cubao, Quezon City and the secondary venue was the Mall of Asia Arena in Pasay, Metro Manila. The tournament host was University of the East and the tournament commissioner was Andy Jao.

The UAAP Season 77 juniors division basketball tournament started on November 29, 2014. The UAAP Board decided to move the juniors division basketball tournament from the 1st semester to the 2nd semester to give way to the players participating in the 2014 FIBA Asia Under-18 Championship tournament. The NU Bullpups were the defending champions.

==== Men's tournament ====
===== Elimination round =====
====== Team standings ======
| Pos | Team | W | L | PCT | GB | Qualification |
|---|---|---|---|---|---|---|
| 1 | Ateneo Blue Eagles | 11 | 3 | .786 | — | Twice-to-beat in the semifinals |
| 2 | FEU Tamaraws | 10 | 4 | .714 (Note: Second-seed playoff: FEU 65–60 La Salle) | 1 | Twice-to-beat in the semifinals |
| 3 | De La Salle Green Archers | 10 | 4 | .714 | 1 | Twice-to-win in the semifinals |
| 4 | NU Bulldogs | 9 | 5 | .643 (Note: Fourth-seed playoff: NU 51–49 UE) | 2 | Twice-to-win in the semifinals |
| 5 | UE Red Warriors (H) | 9 | 5 | .643 | 2 | |
| 6 | UST Growling Tigers | 5 | 9 | .357 | 6 | |
| 7 | UP Fighting Maroons | 1 | 13 | .071 (Note: Head-to-head record: UP 1–1 Adamson (UP +9)) | 10 | |
| 8 | Adamson Soaring Falcons | 1 | 13 | .071 | 10 | |

Source: ABS-CBN Sports
Rules for classification: 1) winning percentage; 2) if tied for #2 or #4, one-game playoff; 3) head-to-head record; 4) head-to-head point differential; 5) overall point differential
(H) Hosts

===== Playoffs =====
Semifinals (Top 2 twice-to-beat)
1 | Ateneo | 74 | 63
4 | NU | 78 | 65
2 | FEU | 73 | 67
3 | La Salle | 94 | 64

Finals (Best-of-three playoff)
4 | NU | 70 | 62 | 75
2 | FEU | 75 | 47 | 59

===== Awards =====
- Most Valuable Player: Kiefer Ravena (Ateneo Blue Eagles)
- Rookie of the Year: Arvin Tolentino (Ateneo Blue Eagles)

==== Women's tournament ====
===== Elimination round =====
====== Team standings ======
| Pos | Team | W | L | PCT | GB | Qualification |
|---|---|---|---|---|---|---|
| 1 | NU Lady Bulldogs | 14 | 0 | 1.000 | — | Thrice-to-beat in the Finals (Note: As NU won all of their elimination round games, the stepladder format will be used instead of the regular Final Four format.) |
| 2 | De La Salle Lady Archers | 10 | 4 | .714 | 4 | Twice-to-beat in stepladder round 2 |
| 3 | UST Growling Tigresses | 8 | 6 | .571 (Note: Head-to-head record: UST 1–1 FEU (UST +4)) | 6 | Proceed to stepladder round 1 |
| 4 | FEU Lady Tamaraws | 8 | 6 | .571 | 6 | Proceed to stepladder round 1 |
| 5 | Ateneo Lady Eagles | 7 | 7 | .500 | 7 | |
| 6 | Adamson Lady Falcons | 6 | 8 | .429 | 8 | |
| 7 | UE Lady Warriors (H) | 3 | 11 | .214 | 11 | |
| 8 | UP Lady Maroons | 0 | 14 | .000 | 14 | |

Source: ABS-CBN Sports
Rules for classification: 1) winning percentage; 2) if tied for #2 or #4, one-game playoff; 3) head-to-head record; 4) head-to-head point differential; 5) overall point differential
(H) Hosts

===== Playoffs =====
Stepladder round 1 (Single-elimination)
3 | UST | 61
4 | FEU | 62

Stepladder round 2 (No. 2 twice-to-beat)
2 | La Salle | 56 | 80
4 | FEU | 61 | 81*

Finals (No. 1 thrice-to-beat)
1 | NU | 80 | 59
4 | FEU | 58 | 48

*Overtime

===== Awards =====
- Most Valuable Player: Afril Bernardino (NU Lady Bulldogs)
- Rookie of the Year: Ria Joy Nabalan (NU Lady Bulldogs)

=== Juniors division ===
The UAAP Season 77 juniors division basketball tournament started on November 29, 2014. The tournament main venue is the Ateneo Blue Eagle gym in Katipunan Avenue, Loyola Heights, Quezon City. The tournament host is the University of the East.

==== Elimination round ====
===== Team standings =====
| Pos | Team | W | L | PCT | GB | Qualification |
|---|---|---|---|---|---|---|
| 1 | Ateneo Blue Eaglets | 14 | 0 | 1.000 | — | Thrice-to-beat in the Finals (Note: As Ateneo won all of their elimination round games, the stepladder format will be used instead of the regular Final Four format.) |
| 2 | NUNS Bullpups | 9 | 5 | .643 (Note: Head-to-head record: NSNU 3–1, Adamson 2–2, DLSZ 1–3; second-seed playoff: NSNU 72–45 Adamson) | 5 | Twice-to-beat in stepladder round 2 |
| 3 | Adamson Baby Falcons | 9 | 5 | .643 | 5 | Proceed to stepladder round 1 |
| 4 | Zobel Junior Archers | 9 | 5 | .643 | 5 | Proceed to stepladder round 1 |
| 5 | FEU–D Baby Tamaraws | 8 | 6 | .571 | 6 | |
| 6 | UST Tiger Cubs | 5 | 9 | .357 | 9 | |
| 7 | UPIS Junior Fighting Maroons | 2 | 12 | .143 | 12 | |
| 8 | UE Junior Red Warriors (H) | 0 | 14 | .000 | 14 | |

Source: ABS-CBN Sports
Rules for classification: 1) winning percentage; 2) if tied for #2 or #4, one-game playoff; 3) head-to-head record; 4) head-to-head point differential; 5) overall point differential
(H) Hosts

==== Playoffs ====
Stepladder round 1 (Single-elimination)
3 | Adamson | 81
4 | DLSZ | 87

Stepladder round 2 (No. 2 twice-to-beat)
2 | NU | 61
4 | DLSZ | 45

Finals (No. 1 thrice-to-beat)
1 | Ateneo | 72 | 78 | 90
2 | NU | 76 | 76 | 73

==== Awards ====
- Most Valuable Player: Michael Joseph Nieto (Ateneo Blue Eaglets)
- Rookie of the Year:

== Volleyball ==
=== Seniors' division ===
The UAAP Season 77 seniors' division volleyball tournament started on November 22, 2014 at the Mall of Asia Arena in Pasay, Metro Manila. Opening-day games were the women's teams of UE vs UST at 2 PM and Ateneo vs NU at 4 PM. The tournament main venue is the Filoil Flying V Arena in San Juan City while selected games will be played at the Smart Araneta Coliseum in Cubao, Quezon City, and the Mall of Asia Arena in Pasay. Tournament commissioner was Rustico "Otie" Camangian.

The UAAP Season 77 high school volleyball tournament started on July 26, 2014. The tournament venue was the Adamson University Gym in San Marcelino St., Ermita, Manila. The number of participating schools in the boys' and girls' tournaments both increased to seven. Far Eastern University fielded boys' and girls' volleyball teams this season. Since there are now seven participating schools, the tournaments will have a Final Four format. The UAAP Board decided to move the high school volleyball tournaments from 2nd semester to 1st semester due to the basketball juniors tournament being moved from the 1st semester to 2nd semester.

The tournament host for volleyball was University of the East.

==== Men's tournament ====
===== Elimination round =====
| Pos | Team | Pld | W | L | Pts | SW | SL | SR | SPW | SPL | SPR | Qualification |
|---|---|---|---|---|---|---|---|---|---|---|---|---|
| 1 | Ateneo Blue Eagles | 14 | 11 | 3 | 34 | 38 | 14 | 2.714 | 1214 | 1064 | 1.141 | Semifinals with a twice-to-beat advantage |
| 2 | UST Growling Tigers | 14 | 11 | 3 | 32 | 37 | 15 | 2.467 | 1210 | 1094 | 1.106 | Semifinals with a twice-to-beat advantage |
| 3 | NU Bulldogs | 14 | 10 | 4 | 29 | 33 | 18 | 1.833 | 1079 | 974 | 1.108 | Semifinals |
| 4 | Adamson Soaring Falcons | 14 | 10 | 4 | 29 | 32 | 19 | 1.684 | 1103 | 992 | 1.112 | Semifinals |
| 5 | FEU Tamaraws | 14 | 6 | 8 | 14 | 22 | 34 | 0.647 | 1197 | 1263 | 0.948 | |
| 6 | De La Salle Green Archers | 14 | 4 | 10 | 15 | 21 | 33 | 0.636 | 1134 | 1216 | 0.933 | |
| 7 | UP Fighting Maroons | 14 | 4 | 10 | 12 | 20 | 37 | 0.541 | 1169 | 1252 | 0.934 | |
| 8 | UE Red Warriors (H) | 14 | 0 | 14 | 3 | 9 | 42 | 0.214 | 970 | 1213 | 0.800 | |

Rules for classification: Point system: 3 points = win match in 3 or 4 sets; 2 points = win match in 5 sets; 1 point = lose match in 5 sets; 0 point = lose match in 3 or 4 sets
(H) Host

===== Playoffs =====
Semifinals (Nos. 1 & 2 have twice-to-beat advantage)
1 | Ateneo | 3
4 | Adamson | 1
2 | UST | 1 | 0
3 | NU | 3 | 3

Finals (Best-of-three series)
1 | Ateneo | 3 | 3
3 | NU | 1 | 1

===== Awards =====
- Most Valuable Player: Marck Jesus Espejo (Ateneo Blue Eagles)
- Rookie of the Year: Edward Camposano (UE Red Warriors)

==== Women's tournament ====
===== Elimination round =====
| Pos | Team | Pld | W | L | Pts | SW | SL | SR | SPW | SPL | SPR | Qualification |
|---|---|---|---|---|---|---|---|---|---|---|---|---|
| 1 | Ateneo Lady Eagles | 14 | 14 | 0 | 39 | 42 | 7 | 6.000 | 1161 | 926 | 1.254 | Finals |
| 2 | De La Salle Lady Archers | 14 | 12 | 2 | 37 | 39 | 11 | 3.545 | 1212 | 948 | 1.278 | Semifinals with a twice-to-beat advantage |
| 3 | NU Lady Bulldogs | 14 | 8 | 6 | 22 | 25 | 24 | 1.042 | 1083 | 1045 | 1.036 | First round |
| 4 | FEU Lady Tamaraws | 14 | 6 | 8 | 18 | 21 | 26 | 0.808 | 1036 | 1047 | 0.989 | First round |
| 5 | UST Growling Tigresses | 14 | 6 | 8 | 20 | 24 | 26 | 0.923 | 1095 | 1056 | 1.037 | Fourth-seed playoff |
| 6 | UP Lady Maroons | 14 | 5 | 9 | 17 | 23 | 31 | 0.742 | 1114 | 1203 | 0.926 | |
| 7 | Adamson Lady Falcons | 14 | 5 | 9 | 15 | 22 | 30 | 0.733 | 1094 | 1162 | 0.941 | |
| 8 | UE Lady Warriors (H) | 14 | 0 | 14 | 0 | 1 | 42 | 0.024 | 665 | 1073 | 0.620 | |

Rules for classification: Point system: 3 point = win match in 3 or 4 sets; 2 points = win match in 5 sets; 1 point = lose match in 5 sets; 0 point = lose match in 3 or 4 sets
(H) Host

===== Playoffs =====
4th–seed playoff (One–game playoff)
4 | UST | 2
5 | FEU | 3

First round (One–game playoff)
3 | NU | 3
4 | FEU | 1

Semifinals (No. 2 seed has twice-to-beat advantage)
2 | La Salle | 0 | 3
3 | NU | 3 | 1

Finals (No. 1 seed has to win twice; opponent thrice)
1 | Ateneo | 3 | 3
2 | La Salle | 0 | 0

===== Awards =====
- Most Valuable Player: Alyssa Valdez (Ateneo Lady Eagles)
- Rookie of the Year: Ennajie Laure (UST Growling Tigresses) and Kath Arado (UE Lady Warriors)

=== Juniors' division ===
==== Boys' tournament ====
===== Elimination round =====
| Pos | Team | Pld | W | L | PCT | GB | Qualification |
|---|---|---|---|---|---|---|---|
| 1 | UE Junior Red Warriors (H) | 12 | 12 | 0 | 1.000 | — | Advance to the Finals |
| 2 | NUNS Bullpups | 12 | 9 | 3 | .750 | 3 | Twice-to-beat in stepladder round 2 |
| 3 | Ateneo Blue Eaglets | 12 | 8 | 4 | .667 | 4 | Stepladder round 1 |
| 4 | UST Tiger Cubs | 12 | 7 | 5 | .583 | 5 | Stepladder round 1 |
| 5 | Zobel Junior Archers | 12 | 3 | 9 | .250 | 9 | |
| 6 | FEU–D Baby Tamaraws | 12 | 2 | 10 | .167 | 10 | |
| 7 | UPIS Junior Fighting Maroons | 12 | 1 | 11 | .083 | 11 | |

Rules for classification: 1) winning percentage; 2) if tied for #2 or #4, one-game playoff; 3) head-to-head record; 4) head-to-head point differential; 5) overall point differential
(H) Hosts

===== Playoffs =====
Stepladder round 1 (One-game playoff)
3 | Ateneo | 3
4 | UST | 0

Stepladder round 2 (No. 2 has twice-to-beat advantage)
2 | NU | 1 | 0
3 | Ateneo | 3 | 3

Finals (No. 1 seed has to win twice; opponent thrice)
1 | UE | 3 | 3
3 | Ateneo | 2 | 2

===== Awards =====
- Most Valuable Player: Ron Adrian Medalla (UE Junior Red Warriors)
- Rookie of the Year: Raymart Reyes (NUNS Bullpups)

==== Girls' tournament ====
===== Elimination round =====
| Pos | Team | Pld | W | L | PCT | GB | Qualification |
|---|---|---|---|---|---|---|---|
| 1 | NUNS Lady Bullpups | 12 | 11 | 1 | .917 | — | Twice-to-beat in the semifinals |
| 2 | UST Junior Tigresses | 12 | 10 | 2 | .833 | 1 | Twice-to-beat in the semifinals |
| 3 | Zobel Junior Lady Archers | 12 | 9 | 3 | .750 | 2 | Twice-to-win in the semifinals |
| 4 | Adamson Lady Baby Falcons | 12 | 5 | 7 | .417 (Note: Fourth-seed playoff: Adamson 3–2 UE) | 6 | Twice-to-win in the semifinals |
| 5 | UE Junior Lady Warriors (H) | 12 | 5 | 7 | .417 | 6 | Fourth-seed playoff |
| 6 | FEU–D Lady Baby Tamaraws | 12 | 2 | 10 | .167 | 9 | |
| 7 | UPIS Junior Lady Maroons | 12 | 0 | 12 | .000 | 11 | |

Rules for classification: 1) winning percentage; 2) if tied for #2 or #4, one-game playoff; 3) head-to-head record; 4) head-to-head point differential; 5) overall point differential
(H) Hosts

===== Playoffs =====
Fourth-seed playoff
Adamson | 3
UE | 2

Semifinals; Top seeds twice-to-beat
1 | NU | 3
4 | Adamson | 1
2 | UST | 3
3 | La Salle | 1

Finals; Best-of-three series
1 | NU | 3 | 3
2 | UST | 1 | 1

===== Awards =====
- Most Valuable Player: Faith Janine Shirley Nisperos (NUNS Lady Bullpups)
- Rookie of the Year: Rachelle Anne Fabro (FEU–D Lady Baby Tamaraws)

== Beach volleyball ==
The UAAP Season 77 beach volleyball tournament began on August 23, 2014. The tournament venue was the University of the East (UE) sand courts in Caloocan, Metro Manila. Beach volleyball is a single round-robin elimination tournament. Adamson University was the tournament host.

=== Men's tournament ===
==== Elimination round ====
Team standings

| Pos | Team | Pld | W | L | PCT | GB | Qualification |
|---|---|---|---|---|---|---|---|
| 1 | UST Growling Tigers | 7 | 6 | 1 | .857 | — | Twice-to-beat in the semifinals |
| 2 | NU Bulldogs | 7 | 6 | 1 | .857 (Note: Second-seed playoff: NU 2–0 Adamson) | — | Twice-to-beat in the semifinals |
| 3 | Adamson Soaring Falcons | 7 | 6 | 1 | .857 | — | Twice-to-win in the semifinals |
| 4 | FEU Tamaraws | 7 | 4 | 3 | .571 | 2 | Twice-to-win in the semifinals |
| 5 | Ateneo Blue Eagles | 7 | 3 | 4 | .429 | 3 | |
| 6 | UE Red Warriors | 7 | 2 | 5 | .286 | 4 | |
| 7 | UP Fighting Maroons | 7 | 1 | 6 | .143 | 5 | |
| 8 | De La Salle Green Archers | 7 | 0 | 7 | .000 | 6 | |

Source: ABS-CBN Sports
Rules for classification: 1) winning percentage; 2) if tied for #2 or #4, one-game playoff; 3) head-to-head record; 4) head-to-head point differential; 5) overall point differential
Notes:

Match-up results

| Team ╲ Game | 1 | 2 | 3 | 4 | 5 | 6 | 7 |
|---|---|---|---|---|---|---|---|
| ADMU | La Salle school colors | UST school colors | UE school colors | NU school colors | Adamson school colors | UP school colors | FEU school colors |
| AdU | NU school colors | UST school colors | UE school colors | La Salle school colors | Ateneo school colors | FEU school colors | UP school colors |
| DLSU | Ateneo school colors | FEU school colors | UP school colors | Adamson school colors | UST school colors | NU school colors | UE school colors |
| FEU | UE school colors | NU school colors | La Salle school colors | UP school colors | UST school colors | Adamson school colors | Ateneo school colors |
| NU | Adamson school colors | FEU school colors | UP school colors | Ateneo school colors | UE school colors | La Salle school colors | UST school colors |
| UE | FEU school colors | Ateneo school colors | Adamson school colors | UST school colors | NU school colors | UP school colors | La Salle school colors |
| UP | UST school colors | NU school colors | La Salle school colors | FEU school colors | UE school colors | Ateneo school colors | Adamson school colors |
| UST | UP school colors | Ateneo school colors | Adamson school colors | UE school colors | La Salle school colors | FEU school colors | NU school colors |

= Win; = Loss

==== Playoffs ====
2nd-seed playoff
3 | NU | 2
4 | Adamson | 0

Semifinals; Top seeds twice-to-beat
1 | UST | 2
4 | FEU | 0
2 | NU | 2
3 | Adamson | 0

Finals; Best-of-three series
1 | UST | 1 | 2 | 1
2 | NU | 2 | 0 | 2

==== Awards ====
- Most Valuable Player: Josephenry Tipay (NU Bulldogs)
- Rookie of the Year: Edward Camposano (UE Red Warriors)

=== Women's tournament ===
==== Elimination round ====
Team standings

| Pos | Team | Pld | W | L | PCT | GB | Qualification |
|---|---|---|---|---|---|---|---|
| 1 | UST Growling Tigresses | 7 | 7 | 0 | 1.000 | — | Advance to the Finals |
| 2 | De La Salle Lady Archers | 7 | 6 | 1 | .857 | 1 | Twice-to-beat in stepladder round 2 |
| 3 | FEU Lady Tamaraws | 7 | 5 | 2 | .714 | 2 | Qualified to stepladder round 1 |
| 4 | Adamson Lady Falcons | 7 | 4 | 3 | .571 (Note: Fourth-seed playoff: Adamson 2–0 NU) | 3 | Qualified to stepladder round 1 |
| 5 | NU Lady Bulldogs | 7 | 4 | 3 | .571 | 3 | Qualified to fourth-seed playoff |
| 6 | UP Lady Maroons | 7 | 2 | 5 | .286 | 5 | |
| 7 | UE Lady Warriors | 7 | 1 | 6 | .143 | 6 | |
| 8 | Ateneo Lady Eagles | 7 | 0 | 7 | .000 | 7 | |

Source: ABS-CBN Sports
Rules for classification: 1) winning percentage; 2) if tied for #2 or #4, one-game playoff; 3) head-to-head record; 4) head-to-head point differential; 5) overall point differential
Notes:

Match-up results

| Team ╲ Game | 1 | 2 | 3 | 4 | 5 | 6 | 7 |
|---|---|---|---|---|---|---|---|
| AdU | Ateneo school colors | NU school colors | La Salle school colors | UE school colors | FEU school colors | UP school colors | UST school colors |
| ADMU | Adamson school colors | UST school colors | FEU school colors | UP school colors | UE school colors | NU school colors | La Salle school colors |
| DLSU | UST school colors | Adamson school colors | UP school colors | NU school colors | FEU school colors | UE school colors | Ateneo school colors |
| FEU | NU school colors | UE school colors | Ateneo school colors | UST school colors | Adamson school colors | La Salle school colors | UP school colors |
| NU | FEU school colors | Adamson school colors | UP school colors | La Salle school colors | UST school colors | Ateneo school colors | UE school colors |
| UE | UP school colors | UST school colors | FEU school colors | Adamson school colors | Ateneo school colors | La Salle school colors | NU school colors |
| UP | UE school colors | NU school colors | La Salle school colors | Ateneo school colors | UST school colors | Adamson school colors | FEU school colors |
| UST | La Salle school colors | UE school colors | Ateneo school colors | FEU school colors | UP school colors | NU school colors | Adamson school colors |

= Win; = Loss

==== Playoffs ====
4th–seed playoff (One–game playoff)
4 | NU | 0
5 | Adamson | 2

First round (One–game playoff)
3 | FEU | 0
4 | Adamson | 2

Semifinals (No. 2 seed has twice-to-beat advantage)
2 | La Salle | 2
4 | Adamson | 0

Finals (No. 1 seed has to win twice; opponent thrice)
1 | UST | 2 | 1 | 2
2 | La Salle | 0 | 2 | 0

==== Awards ====
- Most Valuable Player: Cherry Ann Rondina (UST Growling Tigresses)
- Rookie of the Year: Rica Jane Rivera (UST Growling Tigresses)

== Football ==
The UAAP Season 77 seniors division football tournament started on November 29, 2014 with a double header in the men's tournament at the Moro Lorenzo Football Field of Ateneo de Manila University in Katipunan Ave., Loyola Heights, Quezon City. UP will face off against La Salle at 4pm, while Ateneo will go against UE at 6pm.

The number of participating schools increased to eight in the men's division. Adamson University fielded a men's team. Adamson made its return in men's football after more than a decade of absence. The tournament host is FEU.

=== Seniors division ===
==== Men's tournament ====
===== Elimination round =====
====== Team standings ======
| Pos | Team | Pld | W | D | L | GF | GA | GD | Pts | Qualification |
|---|---|---|---|---|---|---|---|---|---|---|
| 1 | De La Salle Green Archers | 14 | 9 | 5 | 0 | 24 | 9 | +15 | 32 | Semifinals |
| 2 | FEU Tamaraws | 14 | 9 | 3 | 2 | 52 | 17 | +35 | 30 | Semifinals |
| 3 | UP Fighting Maroons | 14 | 8 | 4 | 2 | 32 | 13 | +19 | 28 | Semifinals |
| 4 | Ateneo Blue Eagles | 14 | 7 | 4 | 3 | 21 | 18 | +3 | 25 | Semifinals |
| 5 | NU Bulldogs | 14 | 7 | 2 | 5 | 21 | 17 | +4 | 23 | |
| 6 | UST Growling Tigers | 14 | 4 | 0 | 10 | 23 | 34 | −11 | 12 | |
| 7 | UE Red Warriors | 14 | 1 | 2 | 11 | 8 | 38 | −30 | 5 | |
| 8 | Adamson Soaring Falcons | 14 | 0 | 2 | 12 | 12 | 47 | −35 | 2 | |

Source: ABS-CBN Sports

===== Playoffs =====
Semifinals
1 | La Salle | 1
4 | Ateneo | 0
2 | FEU (a.e.t.) | 1
3 | UP | 0

Final
1 | La Salle | 2
2 | FEU (a.e.t.) | 3

===== Awards =====
- Most Valuable Player: Jesus Joaquin Melliza (FEU Tamaraws)
- Rookie of the Year: Julian Vincent Roxas (Ateneo Blue Eagles)

==== Women's tournament ====
===== Elimination round =====
====== Team standings ======
| Pos | Team | Pld | W | D | L | GF | GA | GD | Pts | Qualification |
|---|---|---|---|---|---|---|---|---|---|---|
| 1 | UP Lady Maroons | 8 | 5 | 1 | 2 | 12 | 6 | +6 | 16 | Finals |
| 2 | FEU Lady Tamaraws | 8 | 5 | 1 | 2 | 11 | 8 | +3 | 16 | Finals |
| 3 | Ateneo Lady Eagles | 8 | 3 | 2 | 3 | 8 | 6 | +2 | 11 | |
| 4 | De La Salle Lady Archers | 8 | 2 | 2 | 4 | 5 | 8 | −3 | 8 | |
| 5 | UST Growling Tigresses | 8 | 2 | 0 | 6 | 4 | 12 | −8 | 6 | |

Source: ABS-CBN Sports

===== Final =====
| Team 1 | Score | Team 2 |
|---|---|---|
| UP Lady Maroons | 1–2 | FEU Lady Tamaraws |

===== Awards =====
- Most Valuable Player: Alesa Dolino (FEU Lady Tamaraws)
- Rookie of the Year: Marie Chelo Hodges (De La Salle Lady Archers)

=== Juniors division ===
==== Boys' tournament ====
The UAAP Season 77 juniors division football tournament started on January 24, 2015 at the FEU-Diliman football field.

===== Elimination round =====
====== Team standings ======
| Pos | Team | Pld | W | D | L | GF | GA | GD | Pts | Qualification |
|---|---|---|---|---|---|---|---|---|---|---|
| 1 | FEU–D Baby Tamaraws | 6 | 6 | 0 | 0 | 32 | 2 | +30 | 18 | Finals |
| 2 | Ateneo Blue Eaglets | 6 | 3 | 1 | 2 | 12 | 13 | −1 | 10 | Finals |
| 3 | Zobel Junior Archers | 6 | 1 | 1 | 4 | 6 | 19 | −13 | 4 | |
| 4 | UST Tiger Cubs | 6 | 0 | 2 | 4 | 5 | 19 | −14 | 2 | |

Source: ABS-CBN Sports

===== Finals =====
| Team 1 | Score | Team 2 |
|---|---|---|
| FEU–D Baby Tamaraws | 2–1 | Ateneo Blue Eaglets |

===== Awards =====
- Most Valuable Player:
- Rookie of the Year: Miguel Joaquin Roque (Ateneo Blue Eaglets)

== Baseball ==
The UAAP Season 77 baseball tournament began on January 25, 2015 at the Rizal Memorial Baseball Stadium in Malate Manila.

=== Men's tournament ===
==== Elimination round ====
Team standings

| Pos | Team | Pld | W | L | PCT | GB | Qualification |
|---|---|---|---|---|---|---|---|
| 1 | De La Salle Green Archers | 10 | 8 | 2 | .800 | — | Qualified to the Finals |
| 2 | Ateneo Blue Eagles | 10 | 7 | 3 | .700 | 1 | Qualified to the Finals |
| 3 | UP Fighting Maroons | 10 | 5 | 5 | .500 | 3 | |
| 4 | UST Growling Tigers | 10 | 4 | 6 | .400 (Note: Head-to-head record: UST 1–1 NU; UST –0.19, NU –0.26) | 4 | |
| 5 | NU Bulldogs | 10 | 4 | 6 | .400 | 4 | |
| 6 | Adamson Soaring Falcons | 10 | 2 | 8 | .200 | 6 | |

Source: ABS-CBN Sports
Rules for classification: 1) winning percentage; 2) if tied for #2 or #4, one-game playoff; 3) head-to-head record; 4) head-to-head point differential; 5) overall point differential
Notes:

Match-up results

| | Round 1 | | | | | Round 2 | | | | |
| Team ╲ Game | 1 | 2 | 3 | 4 | 5 | 6 | 7 | 8 | 9 | 10 |
|---|---|---|---|---|---|---|---|---|---|---|
| AdU | Ateneo school colors | UST school colors | La Salle school colors | UP school colors | NU school colors | Ateneo school colors | UP school colors | La Salle school colors | NU school colors | UST school colors |
| ADMU | Adamson school colors | UP school colors | UST school colors | NU school colors | La Salle school colors | Adamson school colors | NU school colors | UP school colors | UST school colors | La Salle school colors |
| DLSU | UP school colors | NU school colors | Adamson school colors | UST school colors | Ateneo school colors | NU school colors | UST school colors | Adamson school colors | UP school colors | Ateneo school colors |
| NU | UST school colors | La Salle school colors | UP school colors | Ateneo school colors | Adamson school colors | La Salle school colors | Ateneo school colors | UST school colors | Adamson school colors | UP school colors |
| UP | La Salle school colors | Ateneo school colors | NU school colors | Adamson school colors | UST school colors | UST school colors | Adamson school colors | Ateneo school colors | La Salle school colors | NU school colors |
| UST | NU school colors | Adamson school colors | Ateneo school colors | La Salle school colors | UP school colors | UP school colors | La Salle school colors | NU school colors | Ateneo school colors | Adamson school colors |

= Win; = Loss

==== Scores ====
Results to the right and top of the gray cells are first round games, those to the left and below are second round games. Superscript is the number of innings played before the mercy rule applied.

| Team | AdU | ADMU | DLSU | NU | UP | UST |
|---|---|---|---|---|---|---|
| Adamson | | 3–5 | 6–7 | 4–3 | 1–11^{8} | 10–12 |
| Ateneo | 11–5 | | 4–1 | 19–7^{7} | 8–6 | 12–2^{7} |
| La Salle | 11–5 | 14–12 | | 7–8 | 19–5^{7} | 2–0 |
| NU | 7–6 | 4–9 | 3–6 | | 12–9 | 3–8 |
| UP | 1–8 | 9–8 | 4–9 | 7–4 | | 11–4 |
| UST | 9–3 | 7–1 | 0–13^{5} | 3–4 | 7–9 | |

Legend: Blue = left column team win; Red = top row team win.

==== Finals ====
| March 5 | Ateneo Blue Eagles | 7–3 | De La Salle Green Archers | Rizal Memorial Baseball Stadium, Manila |

| March 13 | Ateneo Blue Eagles | 3–2 | De La Salle Green Archers | Rizal Memorial Baseball Stadium, Manila |

Ateneo wins series 2-0

==== Awards ====
- Most Valuable Player: Andrew Antonio Augustine Tan (Ateneo Blue Eagles)
- Rookie of the Year: Vicente Manuel Barandiaran (De La Salle Green Archers)

=== Boys' tournament ===
==== Elimination round ====
===== Team standings =====
| Pos | Team | Pld | W | L | PCT | GB | Qualification |
|---|---|---|---|---|---|---|---|
| 1 | Ateneo Blue Eaglets | 4 | 3 | 1 | .750 | — | Qualified to the Finals |
| 2 | Zobel Junior Archers | 4 | 3 | 1 | .750 | — | Qualified to the Finals |
| 3 | UST Tiger Cubs | 4 | 0 | 4 | .000 | 3 | |

Source: ABS-CBN Sports
Rules for classification: 1) winning percentage; 2) if tied for #2 or #4, one-game playoff; 3) head-to-head record; 4) head-to-head point differential; 5) overall point differential

===== Match-up results =====
| | Round 1 | | Round 2 | |
| Team ╲ Game | 1 | 2 | 3 | 4 |
|---|---|---|---|---|
| ADMU | UST school colors | La Salle school colors | UST school colors | La Salle school colors |
| DLSZ | Ateneo school colors | UST school colors | UST school colors | Ateneo school colors |
| UST | Ateneo school colors | La Salle school colors | Ateneo school colors | La Salle school colors |

= Win; = Loss

===== Scores =====
Results to the right and top of the gray cells are first round games, those to the left and below are second round games. Superscript is the number of innings played before the mercy rule applied.

| Team | ADMU | DLSU | UST |
|---|---|---|---|
| Ateneo | | - | 12–0^{5} |
| La Salle | 4–9 | | - |
| UST | 6–16 | – | |

Legend: Blue = left column team win; Red = top row team win.

==== Awards ====
- Most Valuable Player:
- Rookie of the Year:

== Softball ==
UAAP softball tournament opened on Jan. 24, 2015 at the Rizal Memorial Baseball Stadium in Malate Manila.

=== Women's tournament ===
==== Elimination round ====
===== Team standings =====
| Pos | Team | Pld | W | L | PCT | GB | Qualification |
|---|---|---|---|---|---|---|---|
| 1 | Adamson Lady Falcons | 12 | 12 | 0 | 1.000 | — | Advance to the Finals |
| 2 | UP Lady Maroons | 12 | 7 | 5 | .583 (Note: Second-seed playoff: UP 7–4 UST) | 5 | Twice-to-beat in stepladder round 2 |
| 3 | UST Growling Tigresses | 12 | 7 | 5 | .583 | 5 | Qualified to stepladder round 1 |
| 4 | NU Lady Bulldogs | 12 | 6 | 6 | .500 (Note: Fourth-seed playoff: NU 11–0 La Salle) | 6 | Qualified to stepladder round 1 |
| 5 | De La Salle Lady Archers | 12 | 6 | 6 | .500 | 6 | Qualified to fourth-seed playoff |
| 6 | UE Lady Warriors | 12 | 4 | 8 | .333 | 8 | |
| 7 | Ateneo Lady Eagles | 12 | 0 | 12 | .000 | 12 | |

Source: ABS-CBN Sports
Rules for classification: 1) winning percentage; 2) if tied for #2 or #4, one-game playoff; 3) head-to-head record; 4) head-to-head point differential; 5) overall point differential

===== Match-up results =====
| | Round 1 | | | | | | Round 2 | | | | | |
| Team ╲ Game | 1 | 2 | 3 | 4 | 5 | 6 | 7 | 8 | 9 | 10 | 11 | 12 |
|---|---|---|---|---|---|---|---|---|---|---|---|---|
| AdU | UST school colors | UP school colors | Ateneo school colors | NU school colors | UE school colors | La Salle school colors | UST school colors | UP school colors | La Salle school colors | Ateneo school colors | UE school colors | NU school colors |
| ADMU | NU school colors | UE school colors | Adamson school colors | La Salle school colors | UST school colors | UP school colors | La Salle school colors | UE school colors | NU school colors | UST school colors | Adamson school colors | UP school colors |
| DLSU | UST school colors | UP school colors | Ateneo school colors | NU school colors | UE school colors | Adamson school colors | Ateneo school colors | UE school colors | Adamson school colors | NU school colors | UST school colors | UP school colors |
| NU | Ateneo school colors | UE school colors | La Salle school colors | Adamson school colors | UST school colors | UP school colors | UST school colors | UP school colors | Ateneo school colors | UE school colors | La Salle school colors | Adamson school colors |
| UE | UP school colors | Ateneo school colors | NU school colors | La Salle school colors | Adamson school colors | UST school colors | UP school colors | Ateneo school colors | La Salle school colors | NU school colors | Adamson school colors | UST school colors |
| UP | UE school colors | La Salle school colors | Adamson school colors | UST school colors | Ateneo school colors | NU school colors | UE school colors | NU school colors | Adamson school colors | UST school colors | Ateneo school colors | La Salle school colors |
| UST | La Salle school colors | Adamson school colors | UP school colors | Ateneo school colors | NU school colors | UE school colors | NU school colors | Adamson school colors | Ateneo school colors | UP school colors | La Salle school colors | UE school colors |

= Win; = Loss

===== Scores =====
Results to the right and top of the gray cells are first round games, those to the left and below are second round games. Superscript is the number of innings played before the mercy rule applied.

| Team | AdU | ADMU | DLSU | NU | UE | UP | UST |
|---|---|---|---|---|---|---|---|
| Adamson | | 10–2^{5} | 11–1^{5} | 13–3 | 10–0 | 8–1^{5} | 11–1^{4} |
| Ateneo | 0–18 | | 1–3 | 5–15^{6} | 4–7 | 1–8 | 0–9 |
| La Salle | 3–11 | 10–0^{4} | | 8–1^{5} | 5–1 | 2–5 | 7–3 |
| NU | 2–13 | 9–6 | 6–5 | | 2–3 | 3–10^{6} | 7–2 |
| UE | 2–10 | 5–0 | 2–4 | 4–6 | | 10–4 | 3–7 |
| UP | 0–7^{6} | 20–1 | 7–0 | 4–3 | 8–2 | | 1–2 |
| UST | 0–12 | 11–4 | 6–2 | 3–9 | 7–0 | 3–2 | |

Legend: Blue = left column team win; Red = top row team win.

==== Playoffs ====
Seeding playoff (One–game playoff)
For 2nd seed
3 | UST | 4
6 | UP | 7
For 4th seed
4 | La Salle | 0
5 | NU | 11

First round (One-tie playoff)
3 | UST | 4
4 | NU | 3

Semifinals (No. 2 seed has twice-to-beat advantage)
2 | UP | 2 | 9
3 | UST | 7 | 1

Finals (No. 1 seed has to win twice; opponent thricee)
1 | Adamson | 6 | 10
2 | UP | 0 | 0

==== Awards ====
- Most Valuable Player: Annalie Benjamen (Adamson Lady Falcons)
- Rookie of the Year: Florable Pabiana (Adamson Lady Falcons)

== Badminton ==
The UAAP Season 77 badminton tournament began on August 9, 2014. The tournament venue was the Rizal Memorial Badminton Hall in Vito Cruz St., Malate, Manila. Badminton is a single round-robin elimination tournament. National University was the tournament host.

=== Men's tournament ===
==== Elimination round ====
Team standings

| Pos | Team | Pld | W | L | PCT | GB | Qualification |
|---|---|---|---|---|---|---|---|
| 1 | NU Bulldogs | 7 | 7 | 0 | 1.000 | — | Advance to the Finals |
| 2 | De La Salle Green Archers | 7 | 6 | 1 | .857 | 1 | Twice-to-beat in stepladder round 2 |
| 3 | Ateneo Blue Eagles | 7 | 5 | 2 | .714 | 2 | Qualified to stepladder round 1 |
| 4 | UP Fighting Maroons | 7 | 4 | 3 | .571 | 3 | Qualified to stepladder round 1 |
| 5 | UST Growling Tigers | 7 | 3 | 4 | .429 | 4 | |
| 6 | Adamson Soaring Falcons | 7 | 2 | 5 | .286 | 5 | |
| 7 | UE Red Warriors | 7 | 1 | 6 | .143 | 6 | |
| 8 | FEU Tamaraws | 7 | 0 | 7 | .000 | 7 | |

Source: ABS-CBN Sports
Rules for classification: 1) winning percentage; 2) if tied for #2 or #4, one-game playoff; 3) head-to-head record; 4) head-to-head point differential; 5) overall point differential

Match-up results

| Team ╲ Game | 1 | 2 | 3 | 4 | 5 | 6 | 7 |
|---|---|---|---|---|---|---|---|
| ADMU | UST school colors | La Salle school colors | UP school colors | FEU school colors | Adamson school colors | UE school colors | NU school colors |
| AdU | La Salle school colors | UST school colors | FEU school colors | NU school colors | Ateneo school colors | UP school colors | UE school colors |
| DLSU | Adamson school colors | Ateneo school colors | UE school colors | UP school colors | UST school colors | NU school colors | FEU school colors |
| FEU | UE school colors | NU school colors | Adamson school colors | Ateneo school colors | UP school colors | UST school colors | La Salle school colors |
| NU | UP school colors | FEU school colors | UST school colors | Adamson school colors | UE school colors | La Salle school colors | Ateneo school colors |
| UE | FEU school colors | UP school colors | La Salle school colors | UST school colors | NU school colors | Ateneo school colors | Adamson school colors |
| UP | NU school colors | UE school colors | Ateneo school colors | La Salle school colors | FEU school colors | Adamson school colors | UST school colors |
| UST | Ateneo school colors | Adamson school colors | NU school colors | UE school colors | La Salle school colors | FEU school colors | UP school colors |

= Win; = Loss

==== Playoffs ====
Stepladder round 1 (One-game playoff)
3 | Ateneo | 3
4 | UP | 1

Stepladder round 2 (No. 2 has twice-to-beat advantage)
2 | La Salle | 3
3 | Ateneo | 0

Finals (#1 seed has 1-0 lead in a best-of-5 series)
1 | NU | 3 | 3
2 | La Salle | 0 | 0

==== Awards ====
- Most Valuable Player: Philip Joper Escueta (NU Bulldogs)
- Rookie of the Year: Alvin Morada (NU Bulldogs)

=== Women's tournament ===
==== Elimination round ====
Team standings

| Pos | Team | Pld | W | L | PCT | GB | Qualification |
|---|---|---|---|---|---|---|---|
| 1 | UP Lady Maroons | 7 | 7 | 0 | 1.000 | — | Advance to the Finals |
| 2 | Ateneo Lady Eagles | 7 | 5 | 2 | .714 (Note: Second-seed playoff: Ateneo 3–1 La Salle) | 2 | Twice-to-beat in stepladder round 2 |
| 3 | De La Salle Lady Archers | 7 | 5 | 2 | .714 | 2 | Qualified to stepladder round 1 |
| 4 | FEU Lady Tamaraws | 7 | 4 | 3 | .571 (Note: Fourth-seed playoff: FEU 3–1 La Salle) | 3 | Qualified to stepladder round 1 |
| 5 | UST Growling Tigresses | 7 | 4 | 3 | .571 | 3 | Qualified to fourth-seed playoff |
| 6 | Adamson Lady Falcons | 7 | 2 | 5 | .286 | 5 | |
| 7 | UE Lady Warriors | 7 | 1 | 6 | .143 | 6 | |
| 8 | NU Lady Bulldogs | 7 | 0 | 7 | .000 | 7 | |

Source: ABS-CBN Sports
Rules for classification: 1) winning percentage; 2) if tied for #2 or #4, one-game playoff; 3) head-to-head record; 4) head-to-head point differential; 5) overall point differential
Notes:

Match-up results

| Team ╲ Game | 1 | 2 | 3 | 4 | 5 | 6 | 7 |
|---|---|---|---|---|---|---|---|
| ADMU | UP school colors | UST school colors | FEU school colors | UE school colors | Adamson school colors | NU school colors | La Salle school colors |
| AdU | UST school colors | UP school colors | UE school colors | La Salle school colors | Ateneo school colors | FEU school colors | NU school colors |
| DLSU | FEU school colors | UE school colors | UP school colors | Adamson school colors | NU school colors | UST school colors | Ateneo school colors |
| FEU | La Salle school colors | NU school colors | Ateneo school colors | UST school colors | UE school colors | Adamson school colors | UP school colors |
| NU | UE school colors | FEU school colors | UST school colors | UP school colors | La Salle school colors | Ateneo school colors | Adamson school colors |
| UE | NU school colors | La Salle school colors | Adamson school colors | Ateneo school colors | FEU school colors | UP school colors | UST school colors |
| UP | Ateneo school colors | Adamson school colors | La Salle school colors | NU school colors | UST school colors | UE school colors | FEU school colors |
| UST | Adamson school colors | Ateneo school colors | NU school colors | FEU school colors | UP school colors | La Salle school colors | UE school colors |

= Win; = Loss

==== Playoffs ====
Seeding playoff (One–game playoff)
For 2nd seed
3 | La Salle | 1
6 | Ateneo | 3
For 4th seed
4 | FEU | 3
5 | UST | 1

First round (One-tie playoff)
3 | La Salle | 2
4 | FEU | 3

Semifinals (No. 2 seed has twice-to-beat advantage)
2 | Ateneo | 3
4 | FEU | 1

Finals (No. 1 seed has thrice-to-beat advantage)
1 | UP | 3 | 3
2 | Ateneo | 2 | 2

==== Awards ====
- Most Valuable Player: Jessie Francisco (UP Lady Maroons)
- Rookie of the Year: Mary Ann Marañon (UP Lady Maroons)

== Table tennis ==
The UAAP Season 77 table tennis tournament began on September 13, 2014. The tournament venue was the Blue Eagle Gym of the Ateneo de Manila University in Katipunan Ave., Loyola Heights, Quezon City. Ateneo de Manila University was the tournament host.

=== Seniors division ===
==== Men's tournament ====
===== Elimination round =====
Team standings

| Pos | Team | Pld | W | L | PCT | GB | Qualification |
|---|---|---|---|---|---|---|---|
| 1 | De La Salle Green Archers | 14 | 14 | 0 | 1.000 | — | Advance to the Finals |
| 2 | UST Growling Tigers | 14 | 11 | 3 | .786 | 3 | Twice-to-beat in stepladder round 2 |
| 3 | UP Fighting Maroons | 14 | 9 | 5 | .643 | 5 | Qualified to stepladder round 1 |
| 4 | FEU Tamaraws | 14 | 8 | 6 | .571 | 6 | Qualified to stepladder round 1 |
| 5 | NU Bulldogs | 14 | 5 | 9 | .357 | 9 | |
| 6 | Adamson Soaring Falcons | 14 | 5 | 9 | .357 | 9 | |
| 7 | UE Red Warriors | 14 | 4 | 10 | .286 | 10 | |
| 8 | Ateneo Blue Eagles | 14 | 0 | 14 | .000 | 14 | |

Source: ABS-CBN Sports
Rules for classification: 1) winning percentage; 2) if tied for #2 or #4, one-game playoff; 3) head-to-head record; 4) head-to-head point differential; 5) overall point differential

Match-up results

| | Round 1 | | | | | | | Round 2 | | | | | | |
| Team ╲ Game | 1 | 2 | 3 | 4 | 5 | 6 | 7 | 8 | 9 | 10 | 11 | 12 | 13 | 14 |
|---|---|---|---|---|---|---|---|---|---|---|---|---|---|---|
| AdU | NU school colors | UE school colors | UP school colors | FEU school colors | La Salle school colors | UST school colors | Ateneo school colors | UE school colors | La Salle school colors | Ateneo school colors | FEU school colors | UST school colors | UP school colors | NU school colors |
| ADMU | UP school colors | UST school colors | NU school colors | UE school colors | FEU school colors | La Salle school colors | Adamson school colors | NU school colors | FEU school colors | Adamson school colors | UST school colors | UP school colors | La Salle school colors | UE school colors |
| DLSU | UE school colors | NU school colors | UST school colors | UP school colors | Adamson school colors | Ateneo school colors | FEU school colors | UST school colors | Adamson school colors | FEU school colors | NU school colors | UE school colors | Ateneo school colors | UP school colors |
| FEU | UST school colors | UP school colors | UE school colors | Adamson school colors | Ateneo school colors | NU school colors | La Salle school colors | UP school colors | Ateneo school colors | La Salle school colors | Adamson school colors | NU school colors | UE school colors | UST school colors |
| NU | Adamson school colors | La Salle school colors | Ateneo school colors | UST school colors | UE school colors | FEU school colors | UP school colors | Ateneo school colors | UP school colors | UE school colors | La Salle school colors | FEU school colors | UST school colors | Adamson school colors |
| UE | La Salle school colors | Adamson school colors | FEU school colors | Ateneo school colors | NU school colors | UP school colors | UST school colors | Adamson school colors | UST school colors | NU school colors | UP school colors | La Salle school colors | FEU school colors | Ateneo school colors |
| UP | Ateneo school colors | FEU school colors | Adamson school colors | La Salle school colors | UST school colors | UE school colors | NU school colors | FEU school colors | NU school colors | UST school colors | UE school colors | Ateneo school colors | Adamson school colors | La Salle school colors |
| UST | FEU school colors | Ateneo school colors | La Salle school colors | NU school colors | UP school colors | Adamson school colors | UE school colors | La Salle school colors | UE school colors | UP school colors | Ateneo school colors | Adamson school colors | NU school colors | FEU school colors |

= Win; = Loss

===== Playoffs =====
Stepladder round 1 (One-game playoff)
3 | UP | 3
4 | FEU | 2

Stepladder round 2 (No. 2 has twice-to-beat advantage)
2 | UST | 1 | 2
3 | UP | 3 | 3

Finals (#1 seed has 1-0 lead in a best-of-5 series)
1 | La Salle | 3 | 3
3 | UP | 0 | 0

===== Awards =====
- Most Valuable Player: Jerald Cristobal (De La Salle Green Archers)
- Rookie of the Year: Vladimir Venz Rarama (Adamson Soaring Falcons)

==== Women's tournament ====
===== Elimination round =====
Team standings

| Pos | Team | Pld | W | L | PCT | GB | Qualification |
|---|---|---|---|---|---|---|---|
| 1 | UP Lady Maroons | 12 | 11 | 1 | .917 | — | Twice-to-beat in the semifinals |
| 2 | FEU Lady Tamaraws | 12 | 10 | 2 | .833 | 1 | Twice-to-beat in the semifinals |
| 3 | De La Salle Lady Archers | 12 | 8 | 4 | .667 | 3 | Twice-to-win in the semifinals |
| 4 | UST Growling Tigresses | 12 | 7 | 5 | .583 | 4 | Twice-to-win in the semifinals |
| 5 | NU Lady Bulldogs | 12 | 4 | 8 | .333 | 7 | |
| 6 | Ateneo Lady Eagles | 12 | 1 | 11 | .083 | 10 | |
| 7 | Adamson Lady Falcons | 12 | 1 | 11 | .083 | 10 | |

Source: ABS-CBN Sports
Rules for classification: 1) winning percentage; 2) if tied for #2 or #4, one-game playoff; 3) head-to-head record; 4) head-to-head point differential; 5) overall point differential

Match-up results

| | Round 1 | | | | | | Round 2 | | | | | |
| Team ╲ Game | 1 | 2 | 3 | 4 | 5 | 6 | 7 | 8 | 9 | 10 | 11 | 12 |
|---|---|---|---|---|---|---|---|---|---|---|---|---|
| AdU | La Salle school colors | FEU school colors | Ateneo school colors | UP school colors | UST school colors | NU school colors | FEU school colors | NU school colors | Ateneo school colors | UP school colors | UST school colors | La Salle school colors |
| ADMU | UST school colors | NU school colors | Adamson school colors | La Salle school colors | FEU school colors | UP school colors | UP school colors | UST school colors | Adamson school colors | La Salle school colors | FEU school colors | NU school colors |
| DLSU | Adamson school colors | FEU school colors | Ateneo school colors | UP school colors | UST school colors | NU school colors | FEU school colors | NU school colors | Ateneo school colors | UP school colors | UST school colors | Adamson school colors |
| FEU | NU school colors | Adamson school colors | La Salle school colors | Ateneo school colors | UP school colors | UST school colors | Adamson school colors | La Salle school colors | NU school colors | Ateneo school colors | UP school colors | UST school colors |
| NU | FEU school colors | Ateneo school colors | UP school colors | UST school colors | Adamson school colors | La Salle school colors | UST school colors | Adamson school colors | La Salle school colors | FEU school colors | Ateneo school colors | UP school colors |
| UP | UST school colors | NU school colors | Adamson school colors | La Salle school colors | FEU school colors | Ateneo school colors | Ateneo school colors | UST school colors | Adamson school colors | La Salle school colors | FEU school colors | NU school colors |
| UST | Ateneo school colors | UP school colors | NU school colors | Adamson school colors | La Salle school colors | FEU school colors | NU school colors | Ateneo school colors | UP school colors | Adamson school colors | La Salle school colors | FEU school colors |

= Win; = Loss

===== Playoffs =====
Semifinals (Nos. 1 & 2 have twice-to-beat advantage)
1 | UP | 3
4 | UST | 2
2 | FEU | 2 | 1
3 | La Salle | 3 | 3

Finals (Best-of-three series)
1 | UP | 2 | 1
3 | La Salle | 3 | 3

===== Awards =====
- Most Valuable Player: Ian Lariba (De La Salle Lady Archers)
- Rookie of the Year: Josephine Talay (FEU Lady Tamaraws)

=== Juniors division ===
==== Boys' tournament ====
===== Elimination round =====
Team standings

| Pos | Team | Pld | W | L | PCT | GB |
|---|---|---|---|---|---|---|
| 1 | UE Junior Red Warriors | 0 | 0 | 0 | — | — |
| 2 | UST Tiger Cubs | 0 | 0 | 0 | — | — |
| 3 | NUNS Bullpups | 0 | 0 | 0 | — | — |
| 4 | Ateneo Blue Eaglets | 0 | 0 | 0 | — | — |
| 5 | Adamson Baby Falcons | 0 | 0 | 0 | — | — |
| 6 | Zobel Junior Archers | 0 | 0 | 0 | — | — |
| 7 | UPIS Junior Fighting Maroons | 0 | 0 | 0 | — | — |

Rules for classification: 1) winning percentage; 2) if tied for #2 or #4, one-game playoff; 3) head-to-head record; 4) head-to-head point differential; 5) overall point differential

Match-up results

| | Round 1 | | | | | | Round 2 | | | | | |
| Team ╲ Game | 1 | 2 | 3 | 4 | 5 | 6 | 7 | 8 | 9 | 10 | 11 | 12 |
|---|---|---|---|---|---|---|---|---|---|---|---|---|
| AdU | UE school colors | | | | | | | | | | | |
| ADMU | | | | | | | | | | | | |
| DLSU | | | | | | | | | | | | |
| NU | | | | | | | | | | | | |
| UE | UST school colors | Adamson school colors | | | | | | | | | | |
| UP | | | | | | | | | | | | |
| UST | UE school colors | | | | | | | | | | | |

= Win; = Loss

===== Awards =====
- Most Valuable Player: Lyndon Jose (UE Junior Red Warriors)
- Rookie of the Year: Paul Vincent Tolentino (UST Tiger Cubs)

== Taekwondo ==
The UAAP Season 77 taekwondo tournament began on September 9, 2014. The tournament venue was the Filoil Flying V Arena in San Juan City, Metro Manila. Taekwondo is a single round-robin elimination tournament. Far Eastern University was the tournament host.

=== Seniors division ===
==== Men's tournament ====
===== Elimination round =====
Team standings

| Pos | Team | Pld | W | L | PCT | GB |
|---|---|---|---|---|---|---|
| 1 | UST Growling Tigers | 6 | 6 | 0 | 1.000 | — |
| 2 | UE Red Warriors | 6 | 5 | 1 | .833 | 1 |
| 3 | NU Bulldogs | 6 | 3 | 3 | .500 | 3 |
| 4 | De La Salle Green Archers | 6 | 3 | 3 | .500 | 3 |
| 5 | FEU Tamaraws | 6 | 2 | 4 | .333 | 4 |
| 6 | Ateneo Blue Eagles | 6 | 1 | 5 | .167 | 5 |
| 7 | UP Fighting Maroons | 6 | 1 | 5 | .167 | 5 |

Source: ABS-CBN Sports
Rules for classification: 1) winning percentage; 2) if tied for #2 or #4, one-game playoff; 3) head-to-head record; 4) head-to-head point differential; 5) overall point differential

Match-up results

| Team ╲ Game | 1 | 2 | 3 | 4 | 5 | 6 |
|---|---|---|---|---|---|---|
| ADMU | La Salle school colors | UP school colors | NU school colors | UST school colors | FEU school colors | UE school colors |
| DLSU | Ateneo school colors | FEU school colors | NU school colors | UP school colors | UST school colors | UE school colors |
| FEU | UST school colors | La Salle school colors | UE school colors | UP school colors | Ateneo school colors | NU school colors |
| NU | Ateneo school colors | UST school colors | La Salle school colors | UE school colors | UP school colors | FEU school colors |
| UE | UP school colors | UST school colors | FEU school colors | NU school colors | La Salle school colors | Ateneo school colors |
| UP | UE school colors | Ateneo school colors | FEU school colors | La Salle school colors | NU school colors | UST school colors |
| UST | FEU school colors | UE school colors | NU school colors | Ateneo school colors | La Salle school colors | UP school colors |

= Win; = Loss

===== Awards =====
- Most Valuable Player: Paul Romero (UST Growling Tigers)
- Rookie of the Year: Aries Capispisan (UST Growling Tigers)

==== Women's tournament ====
===== Elimination round =====
Team standings

| Pos | Team | Pld | W | L | PCT | GB |
|---|---|---|---|---|---|---|
| 1 | UP Lady Maroons | 6 | 5 | 1 | .833 | — |
| 2 | De La Salle Lady Archers | 6 | 4 | 2 | .667 | 1 |
| 3 | UST Growling Tigresses | 6 | 4 | 2 | .667 | 1 |
| 4 | FEU Lady Tamaraws | 6 | 4 | 2 | .667 | 1 |
| 5 | NU Lady Bulldogs | 6 | 2 | 4 | .333 | 3 |
| 6 | Ateneo Lady Eagles | 6 | 1 | 5 | .167 | 4 |
| 7 | UE Lady Warriors | 6 | 1 | 5 | .167 | 4 |

Rules for classification: 1) winning percentage; 2) if tied for #2 or #4, one-game playoff; 3) head-to-head record; 4) head-to-head point differential; 5) overall point differential

===== Awards =====
- Most Valuable Player: Charizza Camille Alombro (UP Lady Maroons)
- Rookie of the Year: Camille Bonje (De La Salle Lady Archers)

Match-up results

| Team ╲ Game | 1 | 2 | 3 | 4 | 5 | 6 |
|---|---|---|---|---|---|---|
| ADMU | UP school colors | UST school colors | La Salle school colors | FEU school colors | UE school colors | NU school colors |
| DLSU | FEU school colors | NU school colors | Ateneo school colors | UST school colors | UE school colors | UP school colors |
| FEU | La Salle school colors | UP school colors | Ateneo school colors | UE school colors | NU school colors | UST school colors |
| NU | UST school colors | La Salle school colors | UE school colors | UP school colors | FEU school colors | Ateneo school colors |
| UE | NU school colors | UST school colors | UP school colors | FEU school colors | La Salle school colors | Ateneo school colors |
| UP | Ateneo school colors | FEU school colors | NU school colors | UE school colors | UST school colors | La Salle school colors |
| UST | NU school colors | Ateneo school colors | UE school colors | La Salle school colors | UP school colors | FEU school colors |

= Win; = Loss

=== Juniors division ===
==== Boys' tournament ====
===== Elimination round =====
Team standings

| Pos | Team | Pld | W | L | PCT | GB |
|---|---|---|---|---|---|---|
| 1 | UE Junior Red Warriors | 0 | 0 | 0 | — | — |
| 2 | UST Tiger Cubs | 0 | 0 | 0 | — | — |
| 3 | FEU–D Baby Tamaraws | 0 | 0 | 0 | — | — |
| 4 | Ateneo Blue Eaglets | 0 | 0 | 0 | — | — |
| 5 | Zobel Junior Archers | 0 | 0 | 0 | — | — |

Rules for classification: 1) winning percentage; 2) if tied for #2 or #4, one-game playoff; 3) head-to-head record; 4) head-to-head point differential; 5) overall point differential

===== Awards =====
- Most Valuable Player:
- Rookie of the Year:

Match-up results

| Team ╲ Game | 1 | 2 | 3 | 4 |
|---|---|---|---|---|
| ADMU | La Salle school colors | FEU school colors | UE school colors | UST school colors |
| DLSU | Ateneo school colors | FEU school colors | UE school colors | UST school colors |
| FEU | UE school colors | Ateneo school colors | La Salle school colors | UST school colors |
| UE | FEU school colors | La Salle school colors | Ateneo school colors | UST school colors |
| UST | UE school colors | La Salle school colors | FEU school colors | Ateneo school colors |

= Win; = Loss

== Chess ==
The UAAP Season 77 chess tournament began on January 10, 2015 at the Henry Sy, Sr. Building in De La Salle University in Taft Avenue, Malate, Manila.

=== Seniors division ===
==== Men's tournament ====
===== Team standings =====
| | | | Matches | | | Pts | Tiebreaks | | |
| Rank | Team | GP | W | D | L | Pts | MP | Res | SBFIDE |
|---|---|---|---|---|---|---|---|---|---|
| 1st place, gold medalist(s) | De La Salle Green Archers | 14 | 12 | 1 | 1 | 40½ | 25 | 0 | 1,026.75 |
| 2nd place, silver medalist(s) | Adamson Soaring Falcons | 14 | 10 | 2 | 2 | 37 | 22 | 0 | 902.75 |
| 3rd place, bronze medalist(s) | UST Growling Tigers | 14 | 8 | 2 | 4 | 33½ | 18 | 0 | 813.75 |
| 4 | FEU Tamaraws | 14 | 6 | 4 | 4 | 30½ | 16 | 0 | 786.25 |
| 5 | NU Bulldogs | 14 | 7 | 1 | 6 | 30½ | 15 | 0 | 716.50 |
| 6 | Ateneo Blue Eagles | 14 | 3 | 2 | 9 | 23½ | 8 | 0 | 590.50 |
| 7 | UP Fighting Maroons | 14 | 1 | 3 | 10 | 17 | 5 | 0 | 442.75 |
| 8 | UE Red Warriors | 14 | 0 | 3 | 11 | 11½ | 3 | 0 | 299.25 |

===== Match-up results =====
| | Round 1 | | | | | | | Round 2 | | | | | | |
| Team ╲ Game | 1 | 2 | 3 | 4 | 5 | 6 | 7 | 8 | 9 | 10 | 11 | 12 | 13 | 14 |
|---|---|---|---|---|---|---|---|---|---|---|---|---|---|---|
| AdU | UST school colors | UP school colors | La Salle school colors | Ateneo school colors | UE school colors | NU school colors | FEU school colors | UST school colors | FEU school colors | NU school colors | Ateneo school colors | UP school colors | UE school colors | La Salle school colors |
| ADMU | NU school colors | La Salle school colors | UP school colors | Adamson school colors | FEU school colors | UST school colors | UE school colors | UE school colors | La Salle school colors | UP school colors | Adamson school colors | NU school colors | UST school colors | FEU school colors |
| DLSU | FEU school colors | Ateneo school colors | Adamson school colors | UE school colors | NU school colors | UP school colors | UST school colors | NU school colors | Ateneo school colors | UST school colors | UP school colors | UE school colors | FEU school colors | Adamson school colors |
| FEU | La Salle school colors | NU school colors | UST school colors | UP school colors | Ateneo school colors | UE school colors | Adamson school colors | UP school colors | Adamson school colors | UE school colors | NU school colors | UST school colors | La Salle school colors | Ateneo school colors |
| NU | Ateneo school colors | FEU school colors | UE school colors | UST school colors | La Salle school colors | NU school colors | UP school colors | La Salle school colors | UE school colors | Adamson school colors | FEU school colors | Ateneo school colors | UP school colors | UST school colors |
| UE | UP school colors | UST school colors | NU school colors | La Salle school colors | Adamson school colors | FEU school colors | Ateneo school colors | La Salle school colors | NU school colors | FEU school colors | UST school colors | La Salle school colors | Adamson school colors | UP school colors |
| UP | UE school colors | Adamson school colors | Ateneo school colors | FEU school colors | UST school colors | La Salle school colors | NU school colors | FEU school colors | UST school colors | Ateneo school colors | La Salle school colors | Adamson school colors | NU school colors | UE school colors |
| UST | Adamson school colors | UE school colors | FEU school colors | NU school colors | UP school colors | Ateneo school colors | La Salle school colors | Adamson school colors | UP school colors | La Salle school colors | UE school colors | FEU school colors | Ateneo school colors | NU school colors |

= Win; = Draw; = Loss

===== Results =====
| Opposing team: | | DLSU | | AdU | | UST | | FEU | | NU | | ADMU | | UP | | UE | | Points |
| Round: | | 1 | 2 | 1 | 2 | 1 | 2 | 1 | 2 | 1 | 2 | 1 | 2 | 1 | 2 | 1 | 2 | Points |
| 1st place, gold medalist(s) | La Salle | | | 1½ | 3 | 3½ | 2½ | 2½ | 2½ | 3 | 3½ | 2 | 3 | 3 | 3½ | 3 | 4 | 40½ |
| 2nd place, silver medalist(s) | Adamson | 2½ | 1 | | | 2½ | 1½ | 2 | 2 | 2½ | 3 | 2½ | 3 | 3½ | 4 | 3 | 4 | 37 |
| 3rd place, bronze medalist(s) | UST | ½ | 1½ | 1½ | 2½ | | | 2 | 1 | 2½ | 2 | 2½ | 2½ | 4 | 3 | 4 | 4 | 33½ |
| 4 | FEU | 1½ | 1½ | 2 | 2 | 2 | 3 | | | 1 | 3 | 2½ | 3 | 3 | 1 | 3 | 2 | 30½ |
| 5 | NU | 1 | ½ | 1½ | 1 | 1½ | 2 | 3 | 1 | | | 3 | 3½ | 2½ | 2½ | 4 | 3½ | 30½ |
| 6 | Ateneo | 2 | 1 | 1½ | 1 | 1½ | 1½ | 1½ | 1 | 1 | ½ | | | 2 | 3 | 3½ | 2½ | 23½ |
| 7 | UP | 1 | ½ | ½ | 0 | 0 | 1 | 1 | 3 | 1½ | 1½ | 2 | 1 | | | 2 | 2 | 17 |
| 8 | UE | 1 | 0 | 1 | 0 | 0 | 0 | 1 | 2 | 0 | ½ | ½ | 1½ | 2 | 2 | | | 11½ |

===== Awards =====
- Most Valuable Player: Jerad Docena (De La Salle Green Archers)
- Rookie of the Year: Jerad Docena (De La Salle Green Archers)

==== Women's tournament ====
===== Team standings =====
| | | | Matches | | | Pts | Tiebreaks | | |
| Rank | Team | GP | W | D | L | Pts | MP | Res | SBFIDE |
|---|---|---|---|---|---|---|---|---|---|
| 1st place, gold medalist(s) | FEU Lady Tamaraws | 14 | 13 | 0 | 1 | 44 | 26 | 0 | 1,071.00 |
| 2nd place, silver medalist(s) | De La Salle Lady Archers | 14 | 12 | 1 | 1 | 43 | 25 | 0 | 1,053.25 |
| 3rd place, bronze medalist(s) | UP Lady Maroons | 14 | 7 | 2 | 5 | 31½ | 16 | 0 | 755.50 |
| 4 | NU Lady Bulldogs | 14 | 7 | 1 | 6 | 27½ | 15 | 0 | 631.50 |
| 5 | UST Growling Tigresses | 14 | 3 | 4 | 7 | 23 | 10 | 0 | 584.75 |
| 6 | Adamson Lady Falcons | 14 | 1 | 5 | 8 | 21 | 7 | 0 | 530.00 |
| 7 | UE Lady Warriors | 14 | 2 | 4 | 8 | 17 | 8 | 0 | 423.50 |
| 8 | Ateneo Lady Eagles | 14 | 1 | 3 | 10 | 17 | 5 | 0 | 413.00 |

===== Match-up results =====
| | Round 1 | | | | | | | Round 2 | | | | | | |
| Team ╲ Game | 1 | 2 | 3 | 4 | 5 | 6 | 7 | 8 | 9 | 10 | 11 | 12 | 13 | 14 |
|---|---|---|---|---|---|---|---|---|---|---|---|---|---|---|
| AdU | Ateneo school colors | UP school colors | UE school colors | La Salle school colors | UST school colors | FEU school colors | NU school colors | UE school colors | FEU school colors | Ateneo school colors | La Salle school colors | UP school colors | NU school colors | UST school colors |
| ADMU | Adamson school colors | UST school colors | NU school colors | FEU school colors | UP school colors | La Salle school colors | UE school colors | UST school colors | NU school colors | Adamson school colors | FEU school colors | La Salle school colors | UP school colors | UE school colors |
| DLSU | FEU school colors | NU school colors | UST school colors | Adamson school colors | UE school colors | Ateneo school colors | UP school colors | NU school colors | UST school colors | UP school colors | Adamson school colors | Ateneo school colors | UE school colors | FEU school colors |
| FEU | La Salle school colors | UE school colors | UP school colors | Ateneo school colors | NU school colors | Adamson school colors | UST school colors | UP school colors | Adamson school colors | NU school colors | Ateneo school colors | UE school colors | UST school colors | La Salle school colors |
| NU | UE school colors | La Salle school colors | Ateneo school colors | UST school colors | FEU school colors | UP school colors | Adamson school colors | La Salle school colors | Ateneo school colors | FEU school colors | UE school colors | UST school colors | Adamson school colors | UP school colors |
| UE | NU school colors | FEU school colors | Adamson school colors | UP school colors | La Salle school colors | UST school colors | Ateneo school colors | Adamson school colors | UP school colors | UST school colors | NU school colors | FEU school colors | La Salle school colors | Ateneo school colors |
| UP | UST school colors | Adamson school colors | FEU school colors | UE school colors | Ateneo school colors | NU school colors | La Salle school colors | FEU school colors | UE school colors | La Salle school colors | UST school colors | Adamson school colors | Ateneo school colors | NU school colors |
| UST | UP school colors | Ateneo school colors | La Salle school colors | NU school colors | Adamson school colors | UE school colors | FEU school colors | Ateneo school colors | La Salle school colors | UE school colors | UP school colors | NU school colors | FEU school colors | Adamson school colors |

= Win; = Draw; = Loss

===== Results =====
| Opposing team: | | FEU | | DLSU | | UP | | NU | | UST | | AdU | | UE | | ADMU | | Points |
| Round: | | 1 | 2 | 1 | 2 | 1 | 2 | 1 | 2 | 1 | 2 | 1 | 2 | 1 | 2 | 1 | 2 | Points |
| 1st place, gold medalist(s) | FEU | | | 2½ | 1½ | 3 | 2½ | 3 | 3½ | 4 | 3½ | 3 | 3½ | 3 | 4 | 3 | 4 | 44 |
| 2nd place, silver medalist(s) | La Salle | 1½ | 2½ | | | 4 | 2 | 3½ | 3 | 2½ | 3 | 3 | 3½ | 4 | 3 | 3½ | 4 | 43 |
| 3rd place, bronze medalist(s) | UP | 1 | 1½ | 0 | 2 | | | 3½ | 1½ | 1½ | 2½ | 2½ | 3½ | 2 | 4 | 3½ | 2½ | 31½ |
| 4 | NU | 1 | ½ | ½ | 1 | ½ | 2½ | | | 3 | ½ | 3 | 2 | 4 | 3 | 3½ | 2½ | 27½ |
| 5 | UST | 0 | ½ | 1½ | 1 | 2½ | 1½ | 1 | 3½ | | | 2 | ½ | 2 | 2 | 2 | 3 | 23 |
| 6 | Adamson | 1 | ½ | 1 | ½ | 1½ | ½ | 1 | 2 | 2 | 3½ | | | 2 | 1½ | 2 | 2 | 21 |
| 7 | UE | 1 | 0 | 0 | 1 | 2 | 0 | 0 | 1 | 2 | 2 | 2 | 2½ | | | 1 | 2½ | 17 |
| 8 | Ateneo | 1 | 0 | ½ | 0 | ½ | 1½ | ½ | 1½ | 2 | 1 | 2 | 2 | 3 | 1½ | | | 17 |

===== Awards =====
- Most Valuable Player: Janelle Mae Frayna (FEU Lady Tamaraws)
- Rookie of the Year: Shania Mae Mendoza (FEU Lady Tamaraws)

=== Juniors division ===
==== Boys' tournament ====
===== Team standings =====
| | | | Matches | | | Pts | Tiebreaks | | |
| Rank | Team | GP | W | D | L | Pts | MP | Res | SBFIDE |
|---|---|---|---|---|---|---|---|---|---|
| 1st place, gold medalist(s) | NUNS Bullpups | 12 | 9 | 2 | 1 | 37½ | 20 | 0 | 744.50 |
| 2nd place, silver medalist(s) | FEU–D Baby Tamaraws | 12 | 8 | 1 | 3 | 33 | 17 | 0 | 647.00 |
| 3rd place, bronze medalist(s) | Adamson Baby Falcons | 12 | 7 | 2 | 3 | 32 | 16 | 0 | 625.50 |
| 4 | UE Junior Red Warriors | 12 | 6 | 1 | 5 | 25 | 13 | 0 | 442.50 |
| 5 | UST Tiger Cubs | 12 | 3 | 3 | 6 | 21 | 9 | 0 | 466.50 |
| 6 | Ateneo Blue Eaglets | 12 | 3 | 1 | 8 | 13 | 7 | 0 | 207.00 |
| 7 | Zobel Junior Archers | 12 | 1 | 0 | 11 | 6½ | 2 | 0 | 134.50 |

===== Awards =====
- Most Valuable Player: Ryan Christian Magtabog (NUNS Bullpups)
- Rookie of the Year: Lee Roi Palma (UE Junior Red Warriors)

== Judo ==
The UAAP Season 77 Judo Championships ran from September 27–28, 2014 at the Blue Eagle Gym of the Ateneo de Manila University in Katipunan Ave., Loyola Heights, Quezon City. The tournament host was Ateneo de Manila University.

=== Seniors division ===
==== Men's tournament ====
Team standings

| Rank | Team | Medals | | | | Points |
|---|---|---|---|---|---|---|
| Rank | Team | 1st place, gold medalist(s) | 2nd place, silver medalist(s) | 3rd place, bronze medalist(s) | Total | Points |
| 1st place, gold medalist(s) | UST | 1 | 5 | 5 | 11 | 45 |
| 2nd place, silver medalist(s) | Ateneo | 3 | 1 | 4 | 8 | 43 |
| 3rd place, bronze medalist(s) | UP | 2 | 1 | 4 | 7 | 33 |
| 4 | La Salle | 1 | 0 | 1 | 2 | 12 |
| 5 | UE | 0 | 0 | 0 | 0 | 0 |
| 6 | Adamson | 0 | 0 | 0 | 0 | 0 |

===== Awards =====
- Most Valuable Player: Al Rolan Llamas (UST Growling Tigers)
- Rookie of the Year: Von Kieffer Yu (UP Fighting Maroons)

==== Women's tournament ====
Team standings

| Rank | Team | Medals | | | | Points |
|---|---|---|---|---|---|---|
| Rank | Team | 1st place, gold medalist(s) | 2nd place, silver medalist(s) | 3rd place, bronze medalist(s) | Total | Points |
| 1st place, gold medalist(s) | UST | 2 | 2 | 6 | 10 | 42 |
| 2nd place, silver medalist(s) | Ateneo | 3 | 0 | 1 | 4 | 32 |
| 3rd place, bronze medalist(s) | UE | 1 | 2 | 1 | 4 | 22 |
| 4 | UP | 0 | 3 | 3 | 6 | 21 |
| 5 | La Salle | 1 | 0 | 2 | 3 | 14 |
| 6 | Adamson | 0 | 0 | 1 | 1 | 2 |

===== Awards =====
- Most Valuable Player: Annie Ramirez (UST Growling Tigresses)
- Rookie of the Year: Beatriz Isabel Que (UP Lady Maroons)

=== Juniors division ===
==== Boys' tournament ====
Team standings

| Rank | Team | Medals | | | | Points |
|---|---|---|---|---|---|---|
| Rank | Team | 1st place, gold medalist(s) | 2nd place, silver medalist(s) | 3rd place, bronze medalist(s) | Total | Points |
| 1st place, gold medalist(s) | Ateneo | 6 | 1 | 4 | 11 | 73 |
| 2nd place, silver medalist(s) | UST | 1 | 4 | 2 | 7 | 34 |
| 3rd place, bronze medalist(s) | La Salle | 0 | 1 | 4 | 5 | 13 |
| 4 | UE | 0 | 1 | 2 | 3 | 9 |

===== Awards =====
- Most Valuable Player: Christian Dominic Clemente (Ateneo Blue Eaglets)
- Rookie of the Year: Jose Ariel Querubin (Ateneo Blue Eaglets)

| Medal | Pts. |
|---|---|
| 1st | 10 |
| 2nd | 5 |
| 3rd | 2 |

== Swimming ==
The UAAP Season 77 Swimming Championships was held on October 2–5, 2014 at the Rizal Memorial Swimming Pool in Vito Cruz St., Malate, Manila. The tournament host was National University.

Team ranking is determined by a point system, similar to that of the overall championship. The points given are based on the swimmer's/team's finish in the finals of an event, which include only the top eight finishers from the preliminaries. The gold medalist(s) receive 15 points, silver gets 12, bronze has 10. The following points: 8, 6, 4, 2 and 1 are given to the rest of the participating swimmers/teams according to their order of finish.

| Pos. | Pts. |
|---|---|
| 1st | 15 |
| 2nd | 12 |
| 3rd | 10 |
| 4th | 8 |
| 5th | 6 |
| 6th | 4 |
| 7th | 2 |
| 8th | 1 |

=== Seniors division ===
==== Men's tournament ====
Team standings (Final)

| Rank | Team | Medals | | | | Rec | Points |
|---|---|---|---|---|---|---|---|
| Rank | Team | 1st place, gold medalist(s) | 2nd place, silver medalist(s) | 3rd place, bronze medalist(s) | Total | Rec | Points |
| 1st place, gold medalist(s) | Ateneo | 18 | 11 | 7 | 36 | 10 | 540 |
| 2nd place, silver medalist(s) | UP | 3 | 5 | 7 | 15 | 0 | 325 |
| 3rd place, bronze medalist(s) | UST | 0 | 1 | 5 | 6 | 0 | 187 |
| 4 | La Salle | 1 | 5 | 4 | 10 | 1 | 159 |
| 5 | UE | 0 | 0 | 0 | 0 | 0 | 26 |
| 6 | Adamson | 0 | 0 | 0 | 0 | 0 | 16 |

Rec - Number of new swimming records established

===== Awards =====
- Most Valuable Player: Jessie Khing Lacuna (Ateneo Blue Eagles)
- Rookie of the Year: Alberto Batungbacal (Ateneo Blue Eagles)

==== Women's tournament ====
Team standings (Final)

| Rank | Team | Medals | | | | Rec | Points |
|---|---|---|---|---|---|---|---|
| Rank | Team | 1st place, gold medalist(s) | 2nd place, silver medalist(s) | 3rd place, bronze medalist(s) | Total | Rec | Points |
| 1st place, gold medalist(s) | Ateneo | 15 | 10 | 2 | 27 | 8 | 468 |
| 2nd place, silver medalist(s) | UP | 5 | 10 | 11 | 26 | 4 | 430 |
| 3rd place, bronze medalist(s) | La Salle | 1 | 0 | 3 | 4 | 0 | 121 |
| 4 | UST | 0 | 0 | 5 | 5 | 0 | 95 |
| 5 | UE | 0 | 1 | 1 | 2 | 0 | 56 |
| 6 | Adamson | 0 | 0 | 0 | 0 | 0 | 0 |

Rec - Number of new swimming records established

===== Awards =====
- Most Valuable Player: Hannah Dato (Ateneo Lady Eagles)
- Rookie of the Year: Ariana Herranz (Ateneo Lady Eagles)

=== Juniors division ===
==== Boys' tournament ====
Team standings (Final)

| Rank | Team | Medals | | | | Rec | Points |
|---|---|---|---|---|---|---|---|
| Rank | Team | 1st place, gold medalist(s) | 2nd place, silver medalist(s) | 3rd place, bronze medalist(s) | Total | Rec | Points |
| 1st place, gold medalist(s) | Ateneo | 12 | 8 | 8 | 28 | 2 | 544 |
| 2nd place, silver medalist(s) | UST | 8 | 9 | 1 | 18 | 2 | 318 |
| 3rd place, bronze medalist(s) | La Salle | 2 | 4 | 7 | 13 | 0 | 211 |
| 4 | UP | 0 | 1 | 5 | 6 | 0 | 94 |
| 5 | UE | 0 | 0 | 1 | 1 | 0 | 58 |

Rec - Number of new swimming records established

===== Awards =====
- Most Valuable Player: Miguel Antonio Arellano (Ateneo Blue Eaglets)
- Rookie of the Year: Emilio Jose Viovicente (Ateneo Blue Eaglets)

==== Girls' tournament ====
Team standings (Final)

| Rank | Team | Medals | | | | Rec | Points |
|---|---|---|---|---|---|---|---|
| Rank | Team | 1st place, gold medalist(s) | 2nd place, silver medalist(s) | 3rd place, bronze medalist(s) | Total | Rec | Points |
| 1st place, gold medalist(s) | UST | 6 | 7 | 9 | 22 | 1 | 360 |
| 2nd place, silver medalist(s) | UPIS | 10 | 3 | 2 | 15 | 0 | 317 |
| 3rd place, bronze medalist(s) | DLSZ | 2 | 5 | 5 | 12 | 1 | 235 |
| 4 | UE | 2 | 5 | 4 | 11 | 0 | 233 |

Rec - Number of new swimming records established

===== Awards =====
- Most Valuable Player: Pricila Loren Aquino (UPIS Junior Lady Maroons)
- Rookie of the Year: Imee Saavedra (UST Junior Tigresses)

== Track and field ==
UAAP Season 77 track and field was held on December 6, 7, 9, and 10, 2014 at the Philsports Track and Field Oval in Pasig. The tournament host was De La Salle University.

Team ranking is determined by a point system, similar to that of the overall championship. The gold medalist receives 15 points, silver gets 12, bronze has 10. The following points: 8, 6, 4, 2 and 1 are given to the rest of the participating swimmers/teams according to their order of finish.

=== Men's tournament ===
Team standings (Final)

| Rank | Team | Medals | | | | Rec | Points |
|---|---|---|---|---|---|---|---|
| Rank | Team | 1st place, gold medalist(s) | 2nd place, silver medalist(s) | 3rd place, bronze medalist(s) | Total | Rec | Points |
| 1st place, gold medalist(s) | FEU | 10 | 11 | 4 | 25 | 3 | 479 |
| 2nd place, silver medalist(s) | La Salle | 4 | 1 | 5 | 10 | 1 | 228 |
| 3rd place, bronze medalist(s) | UST | 5 | 4 | 5 | 14 | 1 | 226 |
| 4 | UP | 1 | 5 | 6 | 12 | — | 202 |
| 5 | UE | 0 | 0 | 2 | 2 | — | 106 |
| 6 | Ateneo | 1 | 0 | 0 | 1 | — | 59 |
| 7 | Adamson | 0 | 0 | 0 | 0 | — | 22 |

Rec - Number of new athletic records established

==== Awards ====
- Most Valuable Player: Janry Ubas (FEU Tamaraws)
- Rookie of the Year: Brayan-Jay Pacheco (FEU Tamaraws)

=== Women's tournament ===
Team standings (Final)

| Rank | Team | Medals | | | | Rec | Points |
|---|---|---|---|---|---|---|---|
| Rank | Team | 1st place, gold medalist(s) | 2nd place, silver medalist(s) | 3rd place, bronze medalist(s) | Total | Rec | Points |
| 1st place, gold medalist(s) | UST | 10 | 10 | 6 | 26 | 2 | 478 |
| 2nd place, silver medalist(s) | FEU | 2 | 5 | 10 | 17 | 1 | 377 |
| 3rd place, bronze medalist(s) | UE | 8 | 5 | 2 | 15 | 3 | 259 |
| 4 | La Salle | 2 | 2 | 0 | 4 | — | 106 |
| 5 | UP | 0 | 1 | 1 | 1 | — | 76.5 |
| 6 | Ateneo | 0 | 0 | 0 | 0 | — | 24 |
| 7 | Adamson | 0 | 0 | 0 | 0 | — | 18 |

Rec - Number of new athletic records established

==== Awards ====
- Most Valuable Player: Jennyrose Rosales (UE Lady Warriors)
- Rookie of the Year: Louielyn Pamatian (UE Lady Warriors)

== Special events ==
=== Cheerdance ===
The UAAP Season 77 cheerdance competition was held on September 14, 2014 at the Smart Araneta Coliseum in Cubao, Quezon City. Cheerdance competition is an exhibition event. Points for the overall championship are not awarded to the participating schools.

==== Team standings ====
| Rank | Team | Order | Tumbling | Stunts | Tosses | Pyramids | Dance | Penalties | Points | Percentage |
|---|---|---|---|---|---|---|---|---|---|---|
| 1st place, gold medalist(s) | NU Pep Squad | 8th | 84.00 | 78.00 | 71.50 | 90.00 | 369.00 | –15 | 677.50 | 84.69% |
| 2nd place, silver medalist(s) | UP Pep Squad | 3rd | 78.50 | 74.50 | 60.50 | 85.50 | 360.00 | –1 | 658.00 | 82.25% |
| 3rd place, bronze medalist(s) | UST Salinggawi Dance Troupe | 4th | 69.00 | 70.50 | 67.50 | 69.00 | 353.00 | –4 | 625.00 | 78.13% |
| 4 | Adamson Pep Squad | 7th | 61.00 | 68.50 | 76.50 | 70.00 | 327.00 | –3 | 600.00 | 75.00% |
| 5 | FEU Cheering Squad | 2nd | 76.00 | 69.50 | 64.00 | 69.00 | 326.00 | –5 | 599.50 | 74.94% |
| 6 | DLSU Animo Squad | 6th | 59.50 | 71.50 | 63.50 | 70.50 | 318.00 | –26 | 557.00 | 69.63% |
| 7 | UE Pep Squad | 1st | 62.00 | 61.50 | 60.00 | 65.50 | 273.00 | –19 | 503.00 | 62.88% |
| 8 | Ateneo Blue Babble Battalion | 5th | 50.50 | 63.50 | 59.50 | 54.00 | 279.00 | –12 | 494.50 | 61.81% |

Order refers to order of performance.

- Stunner award: Camille Isabel Lagmay (University of the Philippines)

==== Group stunts competition ====
| Rank | Team | Order | Stunt Difficulty | Stunt Execution | Overall Performance | Total | Percentage |
|---|---|---|---|---|---|---|---|
| 1st place, gold medalist(s) | FEU Cheering Squad | 2nd | 106.00 | 75.00 | 77.50 | 258.50 | 86.17% |
| 2nd place, silver medalist(s) | UST Salinggawi Dance Troupe | 4th | 100.00 | 76.00 | 75.00 | 251.00 | 83.67% |
| 3rd place, bronze medalist(s) | NU Pep Squad | 7th | 96.50 | 72.50 | 70.50 | 239.50 | 79.83% |
| 4 | UP Pep Squad | 3rd | 93.00 | 71.50 | 70.50 | 235.00 | 78.33% |
| 5 | UE Pep Squad | 1st | 74.00 | 67.00 | 31.50 | 202.50 | 67.50% |
| 6 | Adamson Pep Squad | 6th | 72.50 | 62.00 | 58.00 | 192.50 | 64.17% |
| 7 | DLSU Animo Squad | 5th | 67.00 | 60.50 | 56.50 | 184.00 | 61.33% |

=== Street dance ===
The 4th UAAP Street Dance Competition was held on February 8, 2015 at Mall of Asia Arena in Pasay. Street dance competition is an exhibition event. Points for the general championship are not awarded to the participants.

| Rank | Team | Creativity | Formation and staging | Entertainment value | Attire | Variety | Choreography | Musicality | Timing | Execution | Technique | Difficulty | Penalty | Points |
|---|---|---|---|---|---|---|---|---|---|---|---|---|---|---|
| 1st place, gold medalist(s) | UP Street Dance Club | 9.5 | 17.5 | 18 | 8.5 | 19 | 19 | 8.5 | 8.5 | 17.5 | 35.5 | 16.5 | 0 | 178 |
| 2nd place, silver medalist(s) | Company of Ateneo Dancers | 8.3 | 17.5 | 17.5 | 8 | 17.5 | 18.5 | 8 | 8 | 16 | 33.5 | 14.5 | 0 | 167.3 |
| 3rd place, bronze medalist(s) | La Salle Dance Company–Street | 9 | 17.5 | 18.5 | 9 | 18.5 | 19 | 6.5 | 6.5 | 15.5 | 33 | 14 | 0 | 167.0 |
| 4th | Adamson CAST | 7.7 | 17.8 | 16.8 | 8 | 16.5 | 16 | 6 | 6.5 | 17 | 34 | 14 | 0 | 160.3 |
| 5th | FEU Dance Company | 8.6 | 17 | 17.5 | 6.5 | 16.5 | 16.7 | 5.5 | 6 | 15.5 | 30 | 11.5 | 0 | 151.3 |
| 6th | UST Salinggawi Dance Troupe | 7.5 | 15.5 | 14.6 | 7 | 16 | 16.1 | 4.5 | 4.5 | 16 | 31 | 14 | –3 | 143.7 |
| 7th | **UE Street Warriors** | 5.5 | 14.5 | 14.5 | 6.5 | 14 | 13.5 | 5 | 6 | 16.5 | 29 | 12 | 0 | 137 |
| 8th | NU Underdawgz | 5 | 14 | 12 | 6 | 13 | 12 | 4.5 | 5.5 | 15.5 | 29 | 10 | 0 | 126.5 |

Host team in boldface.

== General championship summary ==
The general champion is determined by a point system. The system gives 15 points to the champion team of a UAAP event, 12 to the runner-up, and 10 to the third placer. The following points: 8, 6, 4, 2 and 1 are given to the rest of the participating teams according to their order of finish.

=== Medals table ===
==== Seniors' division ====
| Rank | Team | Gold | Silver | Bronze | Total |
|---|---|---|---|---|---|
| 1 | National University | 6 | 1 | 2 | 9 |
| 2 | University of Santo Tomas | 5 | 5 | 8 | 18 |
| 3 | Ateneo de Manila University | 5 | 3 | 3 | 11 |
| 4 | Far Eastern University | 4 | 3 | 2 | 9 |
| 5 | De La Salle University | 3 | 9 | 4 | 16 |
| 6 | University of the Philippines Diliman | 3 | 6 | 5 | 14 |
| 7 | University of the East* | 2 | 1 | 3 | 6 |
| 8 | Adamson University | 1 | 1 | 2 | 4 |
| Totals (8 entries) | | 29 | 29 | 29 | 87 |

* Host nation (Season host); General champions
Notes: Results are final.

==== Juniors' division ====
| Rank | Team | Gold | Silver | Bronze | Total |
|---|---|---|---|---|---|
| 1 | University of the East* | 6 | 0 | 0 | 6 |
| 2 | Ateneo de Manila University | 3 | 4 | 0 | 7 |
| 3 | National University | 2 | 1 | 2 | 5 |
| 4 | University of Santo Tomas | 1 | 6 | 1 | 8 |
| 5 | Far Eastern University–Diliman | 1 | 1 | 1 | 3 |
| 6 | UP Integrated School | 0 | 1 | 0 | 1 |
| 7 | De La Salle Zobel | 0 | 0 | 7 | 7 |
| 8 | Adamson University | 0 | 0 | 1 | 1 |
| Totals (8 entries) | | 13 | 13 | 12 | 38 |

* Host nation (Season host); General champions
Notes: Results are final.

=== General championship tally ===
==== Seniors' division ====
| | | Basketball | | Volleyball (indoor) | | Volleyball (beach) | | Swimming | | Chess | | Tennis | | Table tennis | | Badminton | | Taekwondo | | | Judo | | Baseball | Softball | Football | | Athletics | | Fencing | | Total | | | |
| Rank | Team | M | W | M | W | M | W | M | W | M | W | M | W | M | W | M | W | M | W | C | M | W | M | W | M | W | M | W | M | W | M | W | C | Overall |
|---|---|---|---|---|---|---|---|---|---|---|---|---|---|---|---|---|---|---|---|---|---|---|---|---|---|---|---|---|---|---|---|---|---|---|
| 1 | UST | 4 | 8 | 10 | 6 | 12 | 15 | 10 | 8 | 10 | 6 | 12 | 12 | 10 | 8 | 6 | 6 | 15 | 10 | 10 | 15 | 15 | 6 | 10 | 4 | 6 | 10 | 15 | 12 | 12 | 136 | 137 | 10 | 283 |
| 2 | La Salle | 10 | 10 | 4 | 12 | 1 | 12 | 8 | 10 | 15 | 12 | 6 | 10 | 15 | 15 | 12 | 8 | 8 | 12 | 12 | 8 | 6 | 12 | 6 | 12 | 8 | 12 | 8 | 8 | 8 | 131 | 137 | 12 | 280 |
| 3 | UP | 2 | 1 | 2 | 4 | 2 | 4 | 12 | 12 | 2 | 10 | 8 | 8 | 12 | 12 | 8 | 15 | 2 | 15 | 15 | 10 | 8 | 10 | 12 | 10 | 12 | 8 | 6 | 10 | 4 | 98 | 123 | 15 | 236 |
| 4 | Ateneo | 8 | 6 | 15 | 15 | 6 | 1 | 15 | 15 | 4 | 1 | 4 | 6 | 1 | 4 | 10 | 12 | 4 | 2 | 6 | 12 | 12 | 15 | 2 | 8 | 10 | 4 | 4 | 4 | 10 | 110 | 100 | 6 | 216 |
| 5 | FEU | 12 | 12 | 6 | 8 | 8 | 8 | — | — | 8 | 15 | — | — | 8 | 10 | 1 | 10 | 6 | 8 | 8 | — | — | — | — | 15 | 15 | 15 | 12 | 6 | 6 | 85 | 104 | 8 | 197 |
| 6 | NU | 15 | 15 | 12 | 10 | 15 | 6 | — | — | 6 | 8 | 15 | 15 | 6 | 6 | 15 | 1 | 10 | 6 | 4 | — | — | 8 | 8 | 6 | — | — | — | — | — | 108 | 75 | 4 | 187 |
| 7 | UE (H) | 6 | 2 | 1 | 1 | 4 | 2 | 6 | 6 | 1 | 2 | 10 | — | 2 | — | 2 | 4 | 12 | 4 | — | 6 | 10 | — | 4 | 2 | — | 6 | 10 | 15 | 15 | 73 | 60 | 0 | 133 |
| 8 | Adamson | 1 | 4 | 8 | 2 | 10 | 10 | 4 | 4 | 12 | 4 | — | — | 4 | 2 | 4 | 2 | — | — | — | 4 | 4 | 4 | 15 | 1 | — | 2 | 2 | — | — | 54 | 49 | 0 | 103 |

(H) Season host; = Champion; = Runner-up; = Third place; — = No team.
Notes: Results are final.

==== Juniors' division ====
| | | Basketball | Volleyball (indoor) | | Swimming | | Chess | Table tennis | Taekwondo | Judo | Football | Athletics | Fencing | | Total | | | | |
| Rank | Team | B | B | G | B | G | C | B | B | B | B | B | B | G | B | G | C | K | Overall |
|---|---|---|---|---|---|---|---|---|---|---|---|---|---|---|---|---|---|---|---|
| 1 | UST | 4 | 8 | 12 | 12 | 15 | 6 | 12 | 12 | 12 | 8 | 8 | 10 | 12 | 86 | 39 | 6 | 0 | 131 |
| 2 | UE (H) | 1 | 15 | 6 | 6 | 8 | 8 | 15 | 15 | 8 | — | 15 | 15 | 15 | 90 | 29 | 8 | 0 | 127 |
| 3 | Ateneo | 15 | 12 | — | 15 | — | 4 | 8 | 8 | 15 | 12 | 12 | 12 | — | 109 | 0 | 4 | 0 | 113 |
| 4 | DLSZ | 10 | 6 | 10 | 10 | 10 | 2 | — | 6 | 10 | 10 | 10 | — | — | 62 | 20 | 2 | 0 | 84 |
| 5 | NU | 12 | 10 | 15 | — | — | 15 | 10 | — | — | — | — | — | — | 32 | 15 | 15 | 0 | 62 |
| 6 | FEU–D | 6 | 4 | 4 | — | — | 12 | — | 10 | — | 15 | — | — | — | 35 | 4 | 12 | 0 | 51 |
| 7 | UPIS | 2 | 2 | 2 | 8 | 12 | — | 4 | — | — | — | — | — | — | 16 | 14 | 0 | 0 | 30 |
| 8 | Adamson | 8 | — | 8 | — | — | 10 | — | — | — | — | — | — | — | 8 | 8 | 10 | 0 | 26 |

(H) Season host; = Champion; = Runner-up; = Third place; — = No team.
Notes: Results are final.

== Individual awards ==
- Athlete of the Year:
  - Seniors:
    - Hannah Dato (Ateneo Lady Eagles, swimming)
    - Ian Lariba (De La Salle Lady Archers, table tennis)
    - Janelle Mae Frayna (FEU Lady Tamaraws, chess)
  - Juniors:
    - Divine Romero (UE Lady Warriors, fencing)

== See also ==
- NCAA Season 90
