= Bong dela Cruz =

Filipino basketball coach

Career information
- College: Adamson
- PBA draft: 1996: 5th round, 17th overall pick
- Drafted by: Pepsi Mega
- Coaching career: 2012–2021

Career history

Coaching
- 2012–2014: UST (assistant)
- 2014–2016: UST
- 2020–2021: Pasig Sta. Lucia Realtors

Career highlights
- As assistant coach: PCCL champion (2012)

Segundo "Bong" dela Cruz III is a Filipino former professional basketball coach.

== Career ==
He served as an assistant coach for the UST Growling Tigers. He was promoted to head coach when Pido Jarencio resigned. He led the Tigers in a finals appearance in 2015, but lost to FEU Tamaraws. He served as head coach until 2016.

He also served as head coach of Pasig Sta. Lucia Realtors of the MPBL.

== Controversy ==
=== Game-fixing ===
In the early part of the 2016, the Growling Tigers management investigated UST head coach Bong dela Cruz for the alleged involvement in game-fixing. A report from sports news website Fastbreak states from a source that the management disbanded the men's basketball team due to game-fixing and sell-out games allegations.

=== Maltreating UST players ===
In his second year of coaching UST, Dela Cruz was accused of maltreating players while on practice. The maltreatment and abusive incidents against some of the players, particularly players from Team B, during his two-year term as a coach. Sooner, the media has yet to confirm the statement regarding the issue on Dela Cruz.

Dela Cruz, later in a statement released on February 1, 2016, said that since the issues emerged, he decided to keep quiet about it. He denies the allegations against him and is confident that he will be proven innocent of the issues against him.

Dela Cruz was later replaced by Boy Sablan.
