= List of UAAP Final Four results =

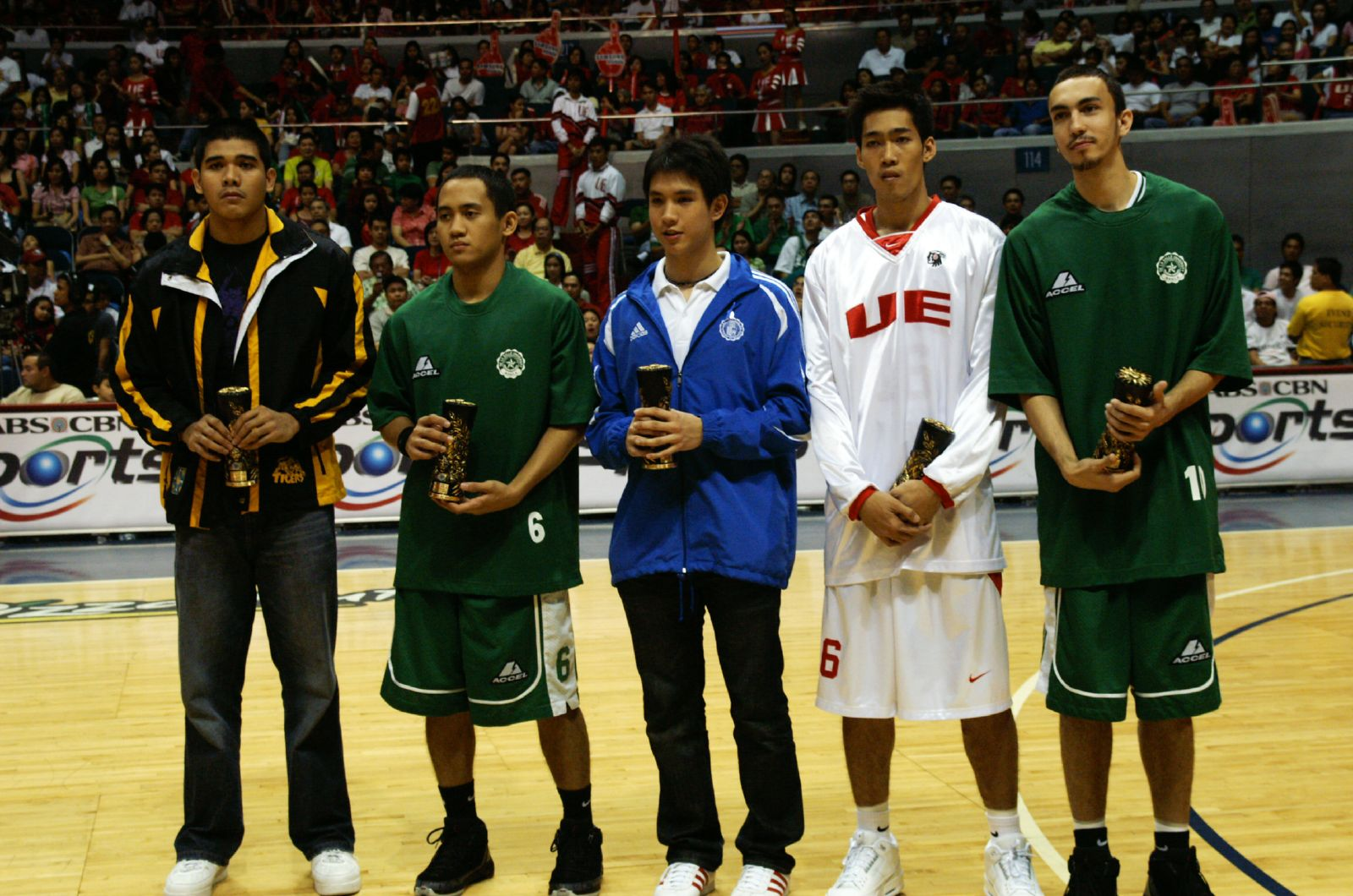
The all-tournament team for the 2007 men's basketball tournament: Jervy Cruz, JV Casio, Chris Tiu (represented by his brother Charles), Mark Borboran and Rico Maierhofer, awarded in Game 2 of the 2007 Finals.

The UAAP Final Four is the postseason of the men's tournament of the UAAP basketball championships of the University Athletic Association of the Philippines (UAAP). Other divisions of UAAP basketball, the women's and juniors', also have their own versions of the Final Four.

Since the UAAP is not a home-and-away league, the position of season host rotates among member universities, and the host pays for the arena rental and other facilities. In previous decades, the common venues for the league's playoffs stages were the Cuneta Astrodome in Pasay, Blue Eagle Gym in Quezon City, Ninoy Aquino Stadium in Manila, and the PhilSports Arena in Pasig. Since 2012, all playoff games (including seed-determining matches, semifinals and championship series) are now played at the Araneta Coliseum and the Mall of Asia Arena.

The league uses a modified Shaughnessy playoff system: the top four teams enter the playoffs, while the top two seeds are given the "twice-to-beat" advantage. This advantage for the No. 1 and No. 2 seeds is that for them to be eliminated in the semifinals, they have to be beaten twice by the No. 4 and No. 3 seeds respectively; however, they need to win only once to advance. The winners in the semifinals dispute the championship trophy in a best-of-three series.

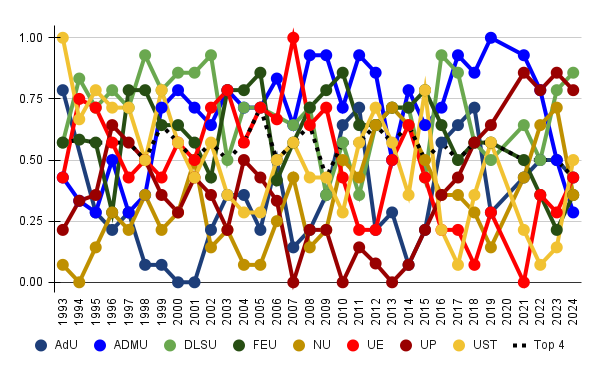
Winning percentage by the teams in the elimination round since 2000; La Salle's forfeited wins were not taken into account.

In its institution in 1993, if a team wins all of its elimination round games (the "sweep"), the sweeping team wins the championship outright. In that same year, the University of Santo Tomas (UST) won all fourteen games and were awarded the championship trophy, scrapping the postseason. As a result, the "stepladder" format was used from 1994 to 2007 if a team sweeps the elimination round – the sweeping team advances outright to the best-of-three finals, while the No. 3 and No. 4 seeds face off in a playoff to face the No. 2 seed still possessing the twice-to-beat advantage. After University of the East (UE) swept the elimination round in 2007 (the first since UST's sweep in 1993), they were beaten by De La Salle University 2–0 in the finals series after a 21-day layoff. As a result, the league modified the "sweeper clause" by instituting the "bonus rule" – the sweeping team has to be beaten thrice in the finals, while its opponent has to be beaten only twice. The "bonus rule" was later repealed in 2016 for most UAAP sports. In the new rule, a team which finishes the elimination round has a bye to the finals and the championship is a best-of-3 series only, while the other three teams will play in a stepladder semifinals round with the number 2 seed getting a twice-to-beat advantage. The stepladder round winner advances to the finals against the sweeping team.

Until 2009, ties among teams that qualified for the playoffs, including those tied for the fourth seed, were resolved by playing a game. If there were three teams tied, two games were to be played to break the tie. By 2009, it was instituted that "common sense" will be used to break ties to avoid "senseless" games.

This list includes men's basketball games played under the final-four format since the 1994 season, a year after the format was instituted, and one-game playoffs in which teams tied after the elimination round for a final-four berth played an extra game to determine which team clinches the higher seed in the playoffs.

== Results ==
For the semifinal columns, the No. 1 vs. No. 4 matchup is given first.

Legend

| Adamson | Adamson University |
| Ateneo | Ateneo de Manila University |
| La Salle | De La Salle University |
| FEU | Far Eastern University |
| NU | National University |

| UE | University of the East |
| UP | University of the Philippines Diliman |
| UST | University of Santo Tomas |
| (OT) | Game went into overtime. |
| ~~strikethrough~~ | Game was forfeited. |

| Season | Finals | | | Semifinals | | | One-game playoff | | | |
| Season | Higher seed | Scores | Lower seed | Higher seed | Score/s | Lower seed | Winner | Score | Loser | Seed |
|---|---|---|---|---|---|---|---|---|---|---|
| 1993 (details) | UST | – | UST named automatic champions after 14–0 elimination round record. | | | | | | | |
| 1994 (details) | La Salle | 77–74; 75–89; 76–77 | UST | La Salle | 65–63 | FEU | None | | | |
| 1994 (details) | La Salle | 77–74; 75–89; 76–77 | UST | UE | 81–87; 74–83 | UST | None | | | |
| 1995 (details) | UST | 78–88; 66–62; 67–64 | La Salle | UST | 65–76; 74–68 | FEU | None | | | |
| 1995 (details) | UST | 78–88; 66–62; 67–64 | La Salle | La Salle | 86–79 | UE | None | | | |
| 1996 (details) | La Salle | 60–65; 54–57 | UST | La Salle | 67–55 | UE | None | | | |
| 1996 (details) | La Salle | 60–65; 54–57 | UST | UST | 63–56 | UP | None | | | |
| 1997 (details) | FEU | 62–60; 65–64 | La Salle | FEU | 69–70; 70–69 | UP | None | | | |
| 1997 (details) | FEU | 62–60; 65–64 | La Salle | UST | 73–82; 72–74 | La Salle | None | | | |
| 1998 (details) | La Salle | 72–47; 63–59 | FEU | La Salle | 51–55; 56–51 | UST | UST | 80–72 | UP | 4th |
| 1998 (details) | La Salle | 72–47; 63–59 | FEU | FEU | 68–81; 83–61 | UE | UST | 80–72 | UP | 4th |
| 1999 (details) | La Salle | 60–62; 81–74; 78–75 (OT) | UST | La Salle | 91–69 | FEU | La Salle | 84–79 | UST | 1st |
| 1999 (details) | La Salle | 60–62; 81–74; 78–75 (OT) | UST | UST | 75–74 | Ateneo | La Salle | 84–79 | UST | 1st |
| 2000 (details) | La Salle | 67–64; 74–65 | FEU | La Salle | 65–62 | UST | UST | 65–61 | UE | 4th |
| 2000 (details) | La Salle | 67–64; 74–65 | FEU | Ateneo | 60–61; 67–75 | FEU | UST | 65–61 | UE | 4th |
| 2001 (Note: Starting in 2001, each game was played with four 10-minute quarters and a 24-second shot clock. Games before 2001 were played with two 20-minute halves and a 30 second shot clock.) (details) | La Salle | 74–68; 72–76; 93–88 | Ateneo | La Salle | 111–85 | NU | NU | 108–102 (2OT) | UE | 4th |
| 2001 (details) | La Salle | 74–68; 72–76; 93–88 | Ateneo | Ateneo | 67–63 | FEU | NU | 108–102 (2OT) | UE | 4th |
| 2002 (details) | La Salle | 70–72; 85–77; 70–77 | Ateneo | La Salle | 97–84 | UST | None | | | |
| 2002 (details) | La Salle | 70–72; 85–77; 70–77 | Ateneo | UE | 78–84; 70–72 | Ateneo | None | | | |
| 2003 (details) | Ateneo | 65–83; 53–69 | FEU | Ateneo | ~~72–76 (OT)~~ (Note: In 2005, La Salle had to forfeit all of their won games (group stage and playoffs) from the 2003 to the 2005 seasons when two of their players were found to have falsified papers to enroll at the school, causing them to be ineligible. This led to the suspension all of La Salle's varsity teams (not just men's basketball) during the 2006–07 season and awarding Far Eastern University (FEU), their finals opponent, the 2004 men's basketball trophy.); 74–68 | La Salle | FEU | 80–75 | UE | 2nd |
| 2003 (details) | Ateneo | 65–83; 53–69 | FEU | FEU | 67–63 | UE | FEU | 80–75 | UE | 2nd |
| 2004 (details) | FEU | ~~51–58~~; 67–57; ~~65–68~~ | La Salle | FEU | 71–64 | UE | La Salle | ~~82–69~~ | Ateneo | 2nd |
| 2004 (details) | La Salle returned their trophy. | | | La Salle | ~~69–55~~ | Ateneo | La Salle | ~~82–69~~ | Ateneo | 2nd |
| 2005 (details) | FEU | 75–73; 73–71 | La Salle | FEU | 78–57 | UE | Ateneo | 76–65 | UE | 3rd |
| 2005 (details) | FEU | 75–73; 73–71 | La Salle | La Salle | ~~74–57~~ | Ateneo | Ateneo | 76–65 | UE | 3rd |
| 2006 (details) | Ateneo | 73–72; 71–87; 74–76 (OT) | UST | Ateneo | 76–73 | Adamson | UST | 85–71 | Adamson | 3rd |
| 2006 (details) | Ateneo | 73–72; 71–87; 74–76 (OT) | UST | UE | 75–79; 81–82 | UST | UST | 85–71 | Adamson | 3rd |
| 2007 (Note: In 2007, UE won all of their group stage games so the "stepladder" format was used for the first time.) (details) | UE | 63–64; 64–73 | La Salle | La Salle | 64–65; 65–60 | Ateneo | UST | 80–69 | FEU | 4th |
| 2007 (details) | UE | 63–64; 64–73 | La Salle | Ateneo | 69–64 | UST | La Salle | 70–69 | Ateneo | 2nd |
| 2008 (details) | Ateneo | 69–61; 62–51 | La Salle | Ateneo | 70–50 | UE | La Salle | 62–59 | FEU | 2nd |
| 2008 (details) | Ateneo | 69–61; 62–51 | La Salle | La Salle | 67–62 | FEU | La Salle | 62–59 | FEU | 2nd |
| 2009 (details) | Ateneo | 78–71; 68–88; 71–58 | UE | Ateneo | 81–64 | UST | None | | | |
| 2009 (details) | Ateneo | 78–71; 68–88; 71–58 | UE | FEU | 74–84; 72–78 | UE | None | | | |
| 2010 (details) | FEU | 49–72; 62–65 | Ateneo | FEU | 69–59 (OT) | La Salle | None | | | |
| 2010 (details) | FEU | 49–72; 62–65 | Ateneo | Ateneo | 68–55 | Adamson | None | | | |
| 2011 (details) | Ateneo | 82–64; 82–69 | FEU | Ateneo | 69–66 | UST | None | | | |
| 2011 (details) | Ateneo | 82–64; 82–69 | FEU | Adamson | 49–59; 74–78 | FEU | None | | | |
| 2012 (details) | Ateneo | 83–78; 65–62 | UST | Ateneo | 66–63 | La Salle | La Salle | 69–66 | FEU | 4th |
| 2012 (details) | Ateneo | 83–78; 65–62 | UST | UST | 63–57 | NU | La Salle | 69–66 | FEU | 4th |
| 2013 (details) | La Salle | 72–73; 77–70; 71–69 (OT) | UST | NU | 62–71; 69–76 | UST | La Salle | 74–69 | FEU | 2nd |
| 2013 (details) | La Salle | 72–73; 77–70; 71–69 (OT) | UST | La Salle | 71–68 | FEU | La Salle | 74–69 | FEU | 2nd |
| 2014 (details) | FEU | 75–70; 47–62; 59–75 | NU | Ateneo | 74–78; 63–65 | NU | NU | 51–49 | UE | 4th |
| 2014 (details) | FEU | 75–70; 47–62; 59–75 | NU | FEU | 73–94; 67–64 | La Salle | FEU | 65–60 | La Salle | 2nd |
| 2015 (details) | UST | 64–75; 62–56; 62–67 | FEU | UST | 64–55 | NU | None | | | |
| 2015 (details) | UST | 64–75; 62–56; 62–67 | FEU | FEU | 76–74 | Ateneo | None | | | |
| 2016 (details) | La Salle | 67–65; 79–72 | Ateneo | La Salle | 69–64 | Adamson | None | | | |
| 2016 (details) | La Salle | 67–65; 79–72 | Ateneo | Ateneo | 61–62; 69–68 (OT) | FEU | None | | | |
| 2017 (details) | Ateneo | 76–70; 83–92; 88–86 | La Salle | Ateneo | 67–80; 88–84 (OT) | FEU | None | | | |
| 2017 (details) | Ateneo | 76–70; 83–92; 88–86 | La Salle | La Salle | 82–75 | Adamson | None | | | |
| 2018 (details) | Ateneo | 88–79; 99–81 | UP | Ateneo | 80–61 | FEU | FEU | 71–70 | La Salle | 4th |
| 2018 (details) | Ateneo | 88–79; 99–81 | UP | Adamson | 71–73; 87–89 (OT) | UP | FEU | 71–70 | La Salle | 4th |
| 2019 (Note: In 2019, Ateneo became the first men's basketball team in the league's history to complete the 16–0 season sweep.) (details) | Ateneo | 91–77; 86–79 | UST | UP | 69–89; 65–68 | UST | None | | | |
| 2019 (details) | Ateneo | 91–77; 86–79 | UST | FEU | 71–81 | UST | None | | | |
| 2020 | Not held | | | Not held | | | None | | | |
| 2021 (Note: The basketball tournaments were held in the second semester of the 2021–2022 academic year and only featured the collegiate men's division due to COVID-19 pandemic restrictions at the time.) (details) | Ateneo | 74–81 (OT); 69–66; 69–72 (OT) | UP | Ateneo | 85–72 | FEU | None | | | |
| 2021 (details) | Ateneo | 74–81 (OT); 69–66; 69–72 (OT) | UP | UP | 80–83; 78–74 | La Salle | None | | | |
| 2022 (details) | Ateneo | 66–72; 65–55; 75–68 | UP | Ateneo | 81–60 | Adamson | Adamson | 80–76 | La Salle | 4th |
| 2022 (details) | Ateneo | 66–72; 65–55; 75–68 | UP | UP | 69–61 | NU | Adamson | 80–76 | La Salle | 4th |
| 2023 (details) | UP | 97–67; 60–82; 69–73 | La Salle | UP | 57–46 | Ateneo | Ateneo | 70–48 | Adamson | 4th |
| 2023 (details) | UP | 97–67; 60–82; 69–73 | La Salle | La Salle | 97–73 | NU | Ateneo | 70–48 | Adamson | 4th |
| 2024 (details) | La Salle | 65–73; 76–75; 62–66 | UP | La Salle | 70–55 | Adamson | Adamson | 68–55 | UE | 4th |
| 2024 (details) | La Salle | 65–73; 76–75; 62–66 | UP | UP | 78–69 | UST | Adamson | 68–55 | UE | 4th |
| 2025 (details) | UP | 70–74; 66–63; 72–80 | La Salle | NU | 77–87; 73–78 | La Salle | None | | | |
| 2025 (details) | UP | 70–74; 66–63; 72–80 | La Salle | UP | 82-81 | UST | None | | | |

== See also ==
- NCAA final four (Philippines)
- List of NCAA final four results (Philippines)
