= UAAP Season 75 basketball tournaments =

Basketball competition in the Philippines

UAAP Season 75
- Host school: National University
Men's Finals	G1	G2	Wins
Ateneo Blue Eagles	83	65	2
UST Growling Tigers	78	62	0
- Duration: October 6–11, 2012
- Arena(s): Mall of Asia Arena; Smart Araneta Coliseum
- Finals MVP: Nico Salva
- Winning coach: Norman Black (5th title)
- Semifinalists: NU Bulldogs; De La Salle Green Archers
- TV network(s): ABS-CBN, Studio 23, The Filipino Channel, Balls, Balls HD
Women's Finals	G1	G2	Wins
FEU Lady Tamaraws	64	70	2+1
De La Salle Lady Archers	56	66	0
- Duration: October 7–11, 2012
- Arena(s): Smart Araneta Coliseum; Filoil Flying V Arena
- Finals MVP: Marilourd Socorro Borja
- Semifinalists: Adamson Lady Falcons; Ateneo Lady Eagles
- TV network(s): Studio 23 (Games 2 & 3)
Juniors' Finals	G1	G2 (3OT)	Wins
FEU Baby Tamaraws	78	113	2
NUNS Bullpups	77	109	0
- Duration: October 7–11, 2012
- Arena(s): Smart Araneta Coliseum; Filoil Flying V Arena
- Finals MVP: Roger Domingo, Jr.
- Semifinalists: UST Tiger Cubs; Ateneo Blue Eaglets
- TV network(s): Studio 23 (Games 2 & 3)

The University Athletic Association of the Philippines Season 75 basketball tournaments are the basketball events of UAAP's 2012–13 season. National University is the host this season. The opening ceremony was held on July 14, 2012, followed by doubleheader basketball games after the ceremonies at the Mall of Asia Arena.

The UAAP named former San Beda Red Cubs head coach Ato Badolato as commissioner for basketball. Badolato also served as basketball commissioner for UAAP Season 73.

== Men's tournament ==
=== Teams ===
Team	University	Coach
Adamson Soaring Falcons	Adamson University (AdU)	(Philippines) Leo Austria
Ateneo Blue Eagles	Ateneo de Manila University (ADMU)	(United States) Norman Black
De La Salle Green Archers	De La Salle University (DLSU)	(Philippines) Gee Abanilla
FEU Tamaraws	Far Eastern University (FEU)	(Philippines) Bert Flores
NU Bulldogs	National University (NU)	(Philippines) Eric Altamirano
UE Red Warriors	University of the East (UE)	(Philippines) Boyzie Zamar
UP Fighting Maroons	University of the Philippines Diliman (UP)	(Philippines) Ricky Dandan
UST Growling Tigers	University of Santo Tomas (UST)	(Philippines) Pido Jarencio

==== Coaching changes ====
Team	Old coach	Reason	New coach
La Salle	(Philippines) Dindo Pumaren	Resigned	(Philippines) Gee Abanilla
UE	(Philippines) Jerry Codiñera	Appointed UE Sports Consultant midseason	(Philippines) Boyzie Zamar

Following the resignation of head coach Dindo Pumaren last September, the De La Salle Green Archers have tapped Gee Abanilla as his replacement. Abanilla previously served as assistant coach for La Salle under former head coach Franz Pumaren and for the Petron Blaze Boosters prior to accepting the head coaching job. In the preseason, he led the Green Archers to a 1st runner-up finish at the Filoil tournament.

=== Elimination round ===
==== Team standings ====
Pos	Team	W	L	PCT	GB	Qualification
1	Ateneo Blue Eagles	12	2	.857	—	Twice-to-beat in the semifinals
2	UST Growling Tigers	10	4	.714	2	Twice-to-beat in the semifinals
3	NU Bulldogs (H)	9	5	.643 (Note: Head-to-head record: NU 3–1, La Salle 2–2, FEU 1–3; fourth-seed playoff: La Salle 69–66 FEU)	3	Twice-to-win in the semifinals
4	De La Salle Green Archers	9	5	.643	3	Twice-to-win in the semifinals
5	FEU Tamaraws	9	5	.643	3	
6	Adamson Soaring Falcons	3	11	.214 (Note: Head-to-head record: Adamson 1–1 UE (Adamson +15))	9	
7	UE Red Warriors	3	11	.214	9	
8	UP Fighting Maroons	1	13	.071	11	

Source: ABS-CBN Sports
Rules for classification: 1) winning percentage; 2) if tied for #2 or #4, one-game playoff; 3) head-to-head record; 4) head-to-head point differential; 5) overall point differential
(H) Hosts

==== Schedule ====
	Round 1							Round 2						
Team ╲ Game	1	2	3	4	5	6	7	8	9	10	11	12	13	14
Adamson	Ateneo school colors	FEU school colors	UP school colors	NU school colors	La Salle school colors	UE school colors	UST school colors	NU school colors	FEU school colors	UP school colors	UST school colors	Ateneo school colors	UE school colors	La Salle school colors
Ateneo	Adamson school colors	UST school colors	NU school colors	La Salle school colors	UP school colors	UE school colors	FEU school colors	UP school colors	FEU school colors	La Salle school colors	UE school colors	Adamson school colors	NU school colors	UST school colors
La Salle	UP school colors	UE school colors	FEU school colors	Ateneo school colors	UST school colors	Adamson school colors	NU school colors	UE school colors	UST school colors	Ateneo school colors	UP school colors	NU school colors	FEU school colors	Adamson school colors
FEU	UST school colors	La Salle school colors	Adamson school colors	UE school colors	NU school colors	UP school colors	Ateneo school colors	UST school colors	Adamson school colors	Ateneo school colors	UE school colors	UP school colors	La Salle school colors	NU school colors
NU	UE school colors	Ateneo school colors	UP school colors	UST school colors	FEU school colors	Adamson school colors	La Salle school colors	Adamson school colors	UST school colors	UE school colors	La Salle school colors	Ateneo school colors	UP school colors	FEU school colors
UE	NU school colors	La Salle school colors	FEU school colors	Ateneo school colors	UST school colors	Adamson school colors	UP school colors	La Salle school colors	NU school colors	UP school colors	Ateneo school colors	FEU school colors	Adamson school colors	UST school colors
UP	La Salle school colors	NU school colors	Adamson school colors	Ateneo school colors	FEU school colors	UST school colors	UE school colors	Ateneo school colors	Adamson school colors	UE school colors	La Salle school colors	UST school colors	FEU school colors	NU school colors
UST	FEU school colors	Ateneo school colors	NU school colors	La Salle school colors	UE school colors	UP school colors	Adamson school colors	FEU school colors	NU school colors	La Salle school colors	Adamson school colors	UP school colors	Ateneo school colors	UE school colors

= Win; = OT win; = Loss; = OT loss

==== Results ====
Team	AdU	ADMU	DLSU	FEU	NU	UE	UP	UST
Adamson Soaring Falcons		57–73	52–56	62–65	62–77	66–71	69–67	60–61
Ateneo Blue Eagles	79–72		71–61	74–71	89–65	68–51	76–70	70–71
De La Salle Green Archers	72–59	67–77		46–48	87–86**	67–59	73–68	82–84**
FEU Tamaraws	76–68	64–77	56–63		57–61	92–66	73–70	73–72
NU Bulldogs	81–77*	56–70	72–62	84–81* (Note: The game was originally played on September 6 in which FEU defeated NU 77-75. However, the UAAP Board nullified the game and called for a replay on September 23 after the video of FEU guard RR Garcia's game-winner was ruled inconclusive.)		90–55	67–50	71–77
UE Red Warriors	69–89	79–77	52–73	78–83	74–83		48–63	69–85
UP Fighting Maroons	70–75	66–73	69–76	63–67	60–65	76–79		58–68
UST Growling Tigers	83–79	66–68	51–53	60–87	58–57*	87–75	75–68	

Legend: Blue = left column team win; Red = top row team win.
Matches with lighter background shading were decided after overtime.

=== Fourth seed playoff ===
Studio 23

September 26
3:30 p.m.

4th seed

De La Salle Green Archers	69–66	FEU Tamaraws
Scoring by quarter: 13–19, 15–16, 18–17, 23–14
Pts: Norbert Torres 21; Rebs: Norbert Torres 13; Asts: LA Revilla 3		Pts: Terrence Romeo 13; Rebs: Russel Escoto 5 Asts: RR Garcia 6
La Salle advances in the Final four

Mall of Asia Arena, Pasay

=== Bracket ===
Semifinals (Top 2 twice-to-beat)
1	Ateneo	66
4	La Salle	63
2	UST	63
3	NU	57

Finals (Best-of-three playoff)
1	Ateneo	83	65
2	UST	78	62

=== Semifinals ===
In the semifinals, the higher seed has the twice-to-beat advantage, where they only have to win once, while their opponents twice, to progress.

==== (1) Ateneo vs. (4) La Salle ====
Studio 23

September 29
3:30 p.m.

Ateneo Blue Eagles	66–63	De La Salle Green Archers
Scoring by quarter: 14–12, 17–14, 7–21, 28–16
Pts: Kiefer Ravena 28; Rebs: Kiefer Ravena 12; Asts: Kiefer Ravena 7		Pts: Yutien Andrada 17; Rebs: JN. Teng, N.Torres 7 each Asts: JN. Teng, T.Torres 4 each
Ateneo wins series in one game

Smart Araneta Coliseum, Quezon City

==== (2) UST vs. (3) NU ====
Studio 23

September 29
12:00 p.m.

UST Growling Tigers	63–57	NU Bulldogs
Scoring by quarter: 17–18, 21–16, 18–16, 7–7
Pts: Kevin Ferrer 17; Rebs: Karim Abdul 8 Asts: Aljon Mariano 4		Pts: Jeff Javillonar 15; Rebs: Javillonar, Mbe 11 each Asts: Bobby Ray Parks Jr. 4
UST wins series in one game

Smart Araneta Coliseum, Quezon City

=== Finals ===
ABS-CBN

October 6
3:30 p.m.

Ateneo Blue Eagles	83–78	UST Growling Tigers
Scoring by quarter: 18–24, 13–14, 30–13, 22–27
Pts: Nico Salva 30; Rebs: Greg Slaughter 12; Asts: Kiefer Ravena 5		Pts: Jeric Teng 25; Rebs: Aljon Mariano 12; Asts: Aljon Mariano 5

Mall of Asia Arena, Pasay
Attendance: 20,686

Studio 23

October 11
3:45 p.m.

Ateneo Blue Eagles	65–62	UST Growling Tigers
Scoring by quarter: 13–14, 16–15, 18–17, 18–16
Pts: Kiefer Ravena 22; Rebs: Greg Slaughter 11; Asts: Ryan Buenafe 5		Pts: Jeric Fortuna 20; Rebs: Karim Abdul 12; Asts: Jeric Fortuna 6
Ateneo wins series 2–0

Smart Araneta Coliseum, Quezon City
Attendance: 20,186

- Finals Most Valuable Player: Nico Salva (Ateneo Blue Eagles)

=== Awards ===
UAAP Season 75 men's basketball champions
Ateneo Blue Eagles
Eighth title, fifth consecutive title

- Most Valuable Player: Bobby Ray Parks Jr. (NU Bulldogs)
- Rookie of the Year: Jeron Teng (De La Salle Green Archers)
- Mythical Five:
  - Greg Slaughter (Ateneo Blue Eagles)
  - Terrence Romeo (FEU Tamaraws)
  - Bobby Ray Parks Jr. (NU Bulldogs)
  - Jeron Teng (De La Salle Green Archers)
  - Karim Abdul (UST Growling Tigers)
- Game Changing Player of the Season: Greg Slaughter (Ateneo Blue Eagles)
- Todo Bigay Player of the Year: Kiefer Ravena (Ateneo Blue Eagles)
- Champ of the Season: Bobby Ray Parks Jr. (NU Bulldogs)
- Maaasahan Player of the Year: Bobby Ray Parks Jr. (NU Bulldogs)

== Women's tournament ==
=== Elimination round ===
==== Team standings ====
Pos	Team	W	L	PCT	GB	Qualification
1	FEU Lady Tamaraws	14	0	1.000	—	Thrice-to-beat in the Finals (Note: As FEU won all of their elimination round games, the stepladder format will be used instead of the regular Final Four format.)
2	De La Salle Lady Archers	11	3	.786	3	Twice-to-beat in stepladder round 2
3	Adamson Lady Falcons	10	4	.714	4	Proceed to stepladder round 1
4	Ateneo Lady Eagles	7	7	.500 (Note: Fourth-seed playoff: Ateneo 50–48 NU)	7	Proceed to stepladder round 1
5	NU Lady Bulldogs	7	7	.500	7	
6	UST Growling Tigresses	5	9	.357	9	
7	UP Lady Maroons	2	12	.143	12	
8	UE Lady Warriors	0	14	.000	14	

Source: ABS-CBN Sports
Rules for classification: 1) winning percentage; 2) if tied for #2 or #4, one-game playoff; 3) head-to-head record; 4) head-to-head point differential; 5) overall point differential

==== Schedule ====
	Round 1							Round 2						
Team ╲ Game	1	2	3	4	5	6	7	8	9	10	11	12	13	14
Adamson	La Salle school colors	NU school colors	UST school colors	UP school colors	UE school colors	Ateneo school colors	FEU school colors	NU school colors	UST school colors	UE school colors	La Salle school colors	UP school colors	Ateneo school colors	FEU school colors
Ateneo	UP school colors	FEU school colors	UE school colors	La Salle school colors	UST school colors	Adamson school colors	NU school colors	UP school colors	FEU school colors	La Salle school colors	UE school colors	NU school colors	Adamson school colors	UST school colors
La Salle	Adamson school colors	UE school colors	FEU school colors	Ateneo school colors	NU school colors	UP school colors	UST school colors	FEU school colors	UP school colors	Ateneo school colors	Adamson school colors	UE school colors	UST school colors	NU school colors
FEU	UST school colors	Ateneo school colors	La Salle school colors	NU school colors	UP school colors	UE school colors	Adamson school colors	La Salle school colors	Ateneo school colors	UP school colors	UST school colors	UE school colors	Adamson school colors	NU school colors
NU	UE school colors	Adamson school colors	UP school colors	FEU school colors	La Salle school colors	UST school colors	Ateneo school colors	Adamson school colors	UE school colors	UST school colors	Ateneo school colors	UP school colors	La Salle school colors	FEU school colors
UE	NU school colors	La Salle school colors	Ateneo school colors	UST school colors	Adamson school colors	FEU school colors	UP school colors	UST school colors	NU school colors	Adamson school colors	Ateneo school colors	La Salle school colors	FEU school colors	UP school colors
UP	Ateneo school colors	UST school colors	NU school colors	Adamson school colors	FEU school colors	La Salle school colors	UE school colors	Ateneo school colors	La Salle school colors	FEU school colors	UST school colors	Adamson school colors	NU school colors	UE school colors
UST	FEU school colors	UP school colors	Adamson school colors	UE school colors	Ateneo school colors	NU school colors	La Salle school colors	UE school colors	Adamson school colors	NU school colors	UP school colors	FEU school colors	La Salle school colors	Ateneo school colors

= Win; = OT win; = Loss; = OT loss

==== Results ====
Team	AdU	ADMU	DLSU	FEU	NU	UE	UP	UST
Adamson Lady Falcons		74–70*	52–60	53–66	76–57	92–39	71–56	66–63
Ateneo Lady Eagles	57–71		43–45	53–68	57–77	70–49	77–43	70–53
La Salle Lady Archers	66–47	48–45		58–63	45–46	67–47	58–45	77–53
FEU Lady Tamaraws	66–61*	54–44	72–68		67–48	85–43	60–50	58–52
NU Lady Bulldogs	69–77	71–75	64–75	50–58		96–59	61–53	59–52
UE Lady Warriors	73–81	76–87	47–81	54–74	56–81		73–79	62–70
UP Lady Maroons	–	52–74	50–69	31–48	56–66	66–61		58–72
UST Tigresses	72–75	54–74	55–63	56–68	74–73*	88–75	78–70	

Legend: Blue = left column team win; Red = top row team win.
Matches with lighter background shading were decided after overtime.

=== Fourth seed playoff ===
September 26
12 p.m.

4th seed

NU Lady Bulldogs	48–50	Ateneo Lady Eagles
Scoring by quarter: 9–12, 11–14, 13–9, 15–15

Mall of Asia Arena, Pasay

=== Bracket ===
Stepladder round 1 (Single-elimination)
3	Adamson	68
4	Ateneo	61

Stepladder round 2 (No. 2 twice-to-beat)
2	La Salle	81
3	Adamson	73

Finals (No. 1 thrice-to-beat)
1	FEU	64	70
2	La Salle	56	66

=== Stepladder semifinals ===
==== (3) Adamson vs. (4) Ateneo ====
September 30
12:00 p.m.

Adamson Lady Falcons	68–61	Ateneo Lady Eagles
Scoring by quarter: 17–17, 20–16, 14–15, 17–13

Filoil Flying V Arena, San Juan

==== (2) La Salle vs. (3) Adamson ====
In the semifinals, La Salle has the twice-to-beat advantage, where they only have to win once, while their opponents twice, to progress.

October 3
12:00 p.m.

De La Salle Lady Archers	81–73	Adamson Lady Falcons
Scoring by quarter: 26–23, 18–15, 19–14, 18–21
La Salle wins series in one game

Filoil Flying V Arena, San Juan

=== Finals ===
FEU has to win two times, while their opponent has to win three times.

Studio 23

October 7
2:00 p.m.

FEU Lady Tamaraws	64–56	De La Salle Lady Archers
Scoring by quarter: 9–8, 9–13, 25–20, 21–15

Filoil Flying V Arena, San Juan

Studio 23

October 11
10:00 a.m.

FEU Lady Tamaraws	70–66	De La Salle Lady Archers
Scoring by quarter: 16–21, 17–12, 22–16, 15–17
FEU wins series in two games

Smart Araneta Coliseum, Quezon City

- Finals Most Valuable Player: Marilourd Socorro Borja (FEU Lady Tamaraws)

=== Awards ===
UAAP Season 75 women's basketball champions
FEU Lady Tamaraws
11th title, second consecutive title

- Most Valuable Player: Allana May Lim (FEU Lady Tamaraws)
- Rookie of the Year: Princess Joy Cochico (Adamson Lady Falcons)
- Mythical Five:
  - Allana May Lim (FEU Lady Tamaraws)
  - Marilourd Socorro Borja (FEU Lady Tamaraws)
  - Aracelie Abaca (De La Salle Lady Archers)
  - Maica Cortes (UST Growling Tigresses)
  - Mary Snow April Peñaranda (Adamson Lady Falcons)

== Juniors' tournament ==
=== Elimination round ===
==== Team standings ====
Pos	Team	W	L	PCT	GB	Qualification
1	FEU–D Baby Tamaraws	13	1	.929 (Note: Head-to-head record: FEU 1–1 NSNU (FEU +3))	—	Twice-to-beat in the semifinals
2	NUNS Bullpups	13	1	.929	—	Twice-to-beat in the semifinals
3	UST Tiger Cubs	10	4	.714	3	Twice-to-win in the semifinals
4	Ateneo Blue Eaglets	8	6	.571	5	Twice-to-win in the semifinals
5	Zobel Junior Archers	5	9	.357	8	
6	UPIS Junior Fighting Maroons	4	10	.286	9	
7	Adamson Baby Falcons	3	11	.214	10	
8	UE Junior Red Warriors	0	14	.000	13	

Source: ABS-CBN Sports
Rules for classification: 1) winning percentage; 2) if tied for #2 or #4, one-game playoff; 3) head-to-head record; 4) head-to-head point differential; 5) overall point differential

==== Schedule ====
	Round 1							Round 2						
Team ╲ Game	1	2	3	4	5	6	7	8	9	10	11	12	13	14
Adamson	UE school colors	NU school colors	UP school colors	Ateneo school colors	La Salle school colors	FEU school colors	UST school colors	La Salle school colors	UP school colors	NU school colors	UST school colors	FEU school colors	Ateneo school colors	UE school colors
Ateneo	FEU school colors	UP school colors	NU school colors	Adamson school colors	UST school colors	UE school colors	La Salle school colors	NU school colors	FEU school colors	UP school colors	UE school colors	La Salle school colors	Adamson school colors	UST school colors
DLSZ	NU school colors	UE school colors	FEU school colors	UP school colors	Adamson school colors	UST school colors	Ateneo school colors	Adamson school colors	UE school colors	UST school colors	NU school colors	Ateneo school colors	FEU school colors	UP school colors
FEU–FERN	Ateneo school colors	UST school colors	La Salle school colors	UE school colors	UP school colors	Adamson school colors	NU school colors	UST school colors	Ateneo school colors	UE school colors	UP school colors	Adamson school colors	La Salle school colors	NU school colors
NSNU	La Salle school colors	Adamson school colors	Ateneo school colors	UST school colors	UE school colors	UP school colors	FEU school colors	Ateneo school colors	UST school colors	Adamson school colors	La Salle school colors	UP school colors	UE school colors	FEU school colors
UE	Adamson school colors	La Salle school colors	UST school colors	FEU school colors	NU school colors	Ateneo school colors	UP school colors	UP school colors	La Salle school colors	FEU school colors	Ateneo school colors	UST school colors	NU school colors	Adamson school colors
UPIS	UST school colors	Ateneo school colors	Adamson school colors	La Salle school colors	FEU school colors	NU school colors	UE school colors	UE school colors	Adamson school colors	Ateneo school colors	FEU school colors	NU school colors	UST school colors	La Salle school colors
UST	UP school colors	FEU school colors	UE school colors	NU school colors	Ateneo school colors	La Salle school colors	Adamson school colors	FEU school colors	NU school colors	La Salle school colors	Adamson school colors	UE school colors	UP school colors	Ateneo school colors

= Win; = OT win; = Loss; = OT loss

==== Results ====
Team	AdU	ADMU	DLSU	FEU	NU	UE	UP	UST
Adamson Baby Falcons		54–75	68–79	59–80	50–75	73–67	61–63	69–80
Ateneo Blue Eaglets	86–64		86–64	58–69	89–95	79–53	92–75	77–83
Zobel Junior Archers	65–61	80–92		67–70	74–80	78–67	66–61	71–78
FEU-FERN Baby Tamaraws	76–55	73–70	71–56		70–62	87–45	76–46	82–66
NU Bullpups	81–59	72–70	77–76	80–75		78–59	69–47	68–64
UE Junior Warriors	54–86	60–88	77–90	39–93	78–86		44–60	55–105
UPIS Junior Maroons	47–57	63–65	52–63	64–87	55–63	–		73–77
UST Tiger Cubs	72–62	72–64	85–63	82–79	72–67	75–52	61–52	

Legend: Blue = left column team win; Red = top row team win.
Matches with lighter background shading were decided after overtime.

=== Bracket ===
Semifinals (Top 2 twice-to-beat)
1	FEU–Diliman	70
4	Ateneo	67
2	NSNU	78
3	UST	66

Finals (Best-of-three playoff)
1	FEU–Diliman	78	113***
2	NSNU	77	109

***Triple overtime

=== Semifinals ===
In the semifinals, the higher seed has the twice-to-beat advantage, where they only have to win once, while their opponents twice, to progress.

==== (1) FEU-D vs. (4) Ateneo ====
September 30
1:45 p.m.

FEU–D Baby Tamaraws	70–67	Ateneo Blue Eaglets
Scoring by quarter: 10–10, 19–20, 21–18, 20–19
FEU-Diliman wins series in one game

Filoil Flying V Arena, San Juan

==== (2) NU vs. (3) UST ====
September 30
3:30 p.m.

NUNS Bullpups	78–66	UST Tiger Cubs
Scoring by quarter: 23–17, 15–13, 21–12, 19–24
NU wins series in one game

Filoil Flying V Arena, San Juan

=== Finals ===
Studio 23

October 7
3:30 p.m.

FEU–D Baby Tamaraws	78–77	NUNS Bullpups
Scoring by quarter: 15–12, 25–19, 10–24, 28–22

Filoil Flying V Arena, San Juan

Studio 23

October 11
12:00 n.n.

FEU–D Baby Tamaraws	113–109 (3OT)	NUNS Bullpups
Scoring by quarter: 26–21, 20–20, 13–18, 19–19, Overtime: 11–11, 11–11, 13–9
FEU wins series 2–0

Smart Araneta Coliseum, Quezon City

- Finals Most Valuable Player: Roger Domingo, Jr. (FEU–D Baby Tamaraws)

=== Awards ===
UAAP Season 75 juniors' basketball champions
FEU–D Baby Tamaraws
Seventh title

- Season Most Valuable Player: Jerie Marlon Pingoy (FEU–D Baby Tamaraws)
- Rookie of the Year: Reggienal Morido (NUNS Bullpups)
- Mythical Five:
  - Thirdy Ravena (Ateneo Blue Eaglets)
  - Jerie Marlon Pingoy (FEU–D Baby Tamaraws)
  - Reggienal Morido (NUNS Bullpups)
  - Alvin Gerard Ungria (UST Tiger Cubs)
  - Renzo Subido (Zobel Junior Archers)

== See also ==
- NCAA Season 88 basketball tournaments

Preceded by Season 74 (2011)	UAAP basketball seasons Season 75 (2012)	Succeeded by Season 76 (2013)
