= 2012 Filoil Flying V Preseason Cup =

Preseason high school and collegiate basketball tournament

The 2012 Filoil Flying V Preseason Hanes Cup is the seventh preseason high school and collegiate basketball tournament organized by Filoil Flying V Sports. The opening ceremonies was held on April 14, 2012 with the first tripleheader of basketball games at the Filoil Flying V Arena in San Juan. All eight teams from the University Athletic Association of the Philippines (UAAP) and ten from the National Collegiate Athletic Association (Philippines) (NCAA) participate in the tournament. Their junior counterparts also join the tournament, except for UE Junior Warriors.

== Participants ==
The tournament is composed of 18 teams, eight are from the UAAP and the remaining ten are from the NCAA. These squads are grouped into two, each consisting of nine teams. Meanwhile, their junior counterparts will also join the tournament, except for UE Junior Warriors, with Xavier School as the lone guest team for this division. The juniors' teams are grouped into three, each consisting of six teams.

=== Men's division ===
| Group A | Group B |
|---|---|
| Ateneo Blue Eagles (UAAP); De La Salle Green Archers (UAAP); Letran Knights (NCAA); Mapúa Cardinals (NCAA); Perpetual Altas (NCAA); San Beda Red Lions (NCAA); UE Red Warriors (UAAP); UP Fighting Maroons (UAAP); UST Growling Tigers (UAAP) | Adamson Soaring Falcons (UAAP); Arellano Chiefs (NCAA); Benilde Blazers (NCAA); EAC Generals (UAAP); FEU Tamaraws (UAAP); JRU Heavy Bombers (NCAA); Lyceum Pirates (NCAA); NU Bulldogs (UAAP); San Sebastian Stags (NCAA) |

=== Juniors' division ===
| Group A | Group B | Group C |
|---|---|---|
| Adamson Baby Falcons (UAAP); La Salle Green Hills Greenies (NCAA); Perpetual Junior Altas (NCAA); San Beda Red Cubs (NCAA); UST Tiger Cubs (UAAP); Xavier Golden Stallions* | Arellano Braves (NCAA); FEU–D Baby Tamaraws (UAAP); JRU Light Bombers (NCAA); Mapúa Red Robins (NCAA); NU Bullpups (UAAP); UPIS Junior Fighting Maroons (UAAP) | Ateneo Blue Eaglets (UAAP); Letran Squires (NCAA); Zobel Junior Archers (UAAP); EAC–ICA Brigadiers (NCAA); Lyceum Junior Pirates (NCAA); San Sebastian Staglets (NCAA) |

== Tournament format ==
Due to different number of groups in men's and juniors' division, each has its own competition format.

=== Men's division ===
The tournament format for men's division are as follows:

- During elimination round, teams will only play against teams in their group in a single round-robin schedule.
- At the end of the eliminations, the top four teams in each group will advance to the quarterfinal round.
- At the quarterfinals:
  - Seeds #1 in group A meets #4 of group B (QF1)
  - Seeds #2 in group B meets #3 of group A (QF2)
  - Seeds #1 in group B meets #4 of group A (QF3)
  - Seeds #2 in group A meets #3 of group B (QF4)
- Winner of QF1 meets winner of QF2 while QF3 winner meets QF4 winner in the semifinals.
- Winners of the semifinals will play for the Final round, while losers will battle for third place.
- The quotient system shall be applied in case of a tie in the standings between two or more teams.
- Only one foreign player shall play at a time in the court.

=== Juniors' division ===
The tournament format for junior's division are as follows:

- During elimination round, teams will only play against teams in their group in a single round-robin schedule.
- The top six teams in overall standings, regardless of the group, will play for the quarterfinal round. The seeds #1 and #2 teams automatically advances to the semifinals.
- At the quarterfinals, team #3 meets #6 while #4 meets #5.
- At the semifinals, winners of the playoffs between #3 and #6 will face team #1, while #2 will play against the winner between #4 and #5.
- Winners of the semifinals will play for the Final round, while losers will battle for third place.
- The quotient system shall be applied in case of a tie in the standings between two or more teams.

== Men's division ==
=== Elimination round ===
==== Group A ====
===== Team standings =====
| Pos | Team | W | L | PCT | GB | Qualification |
|---|---|---|---|---|---|---|
| 1 | San Beda Red Lions | 8 | 0 | 1.000 | — | Quarterfinals |
| 2 | Ateneo Blue Eagles | 6 | 2 | .750 | 2 | Quarterfinals |
| 3 | De La Salle Green Archers | 5 | 3 | .625 (Note: Head-to-head record: La Salle 1–0 UST) | 3 | Quarterfinals |
| 4 | UST Growling Tigers | 5 | 3 | .625 | 3 | Quarterfinals |
| 5 | Letran Knights | 4 | 4 | .500 | 4 | |
| 6 | UE Red Warriors | 3 | 5 | .375 | 5 | |
| 7 | Perpetual Altas | 2 | 6 | .250 (Note: Head-to-head record: Perpetual 1–0 Mapúa) | 6 | |
| 8 | Mapúa Cardinals | 2 | 6 | .250 | 6 | |
| 9 | UP Fighting Maroons | 1 | 7 | .125 | 7 | |

Rules for classification: 1) winning percentage; 2) head-to-head record; 3) head-to-head quotient; 4) overall quotient

===== Schedule =====
| Team ╲ Game | 1 | 2 | 3 | 4 | 5 | 6 | 7 | 8 |
|---|---|---|---|---|---|---|---|---|
| Ateneo | Letran school colors | UPHD school colors | San Beda school colors | UST school colors | UP school colors | UE school colors | Mapua school colors | La Salle school colors |
| La Salle | San Beda school colors | Letran school colors | UST school colors | UP school colors | UE school colors | UPHD school colors | Mapua school colors | Ateneo school colors |
| Letran | Ateneo school colors | UE school colors | La Salle school colors | UPHD school colors | UP school colors | Mapua school colors | UST school colors | San Beda school colors |
| Mapúa | UE school colors | San Beda school colors | UP school colors | Ateneo school colors | UST school colors | UPHD school colors | Letran school colors | La Salle school colors |
| San Beda | La Salle school colors | UST school colors | Ateneo school colors | UP school colors | UE school colors | Mapua school colors | UPHD school colors | Letran school colors |
| UE | Letran school colors | Mapua school colors | San Beda school colors | Ateneo school colors | La Salle school colors | UST school colors | UPHD school colors | UP school colors |
| Perpetual | Ateneo school colors | UST school colors | San Beda school colors | UP school colors | Letran school colors | Mapua school colors | La Salle school colors | UE school colors |
| UP | San Beda school colors | Ateneo school colors | Mapua school colors | UPHD school colors | La Salle school colors | Letran school colors | UE school colors | UST school colors |
| UST | San Beda school colors | UPHD school colors | Ateneo school colors | La Salle school colors | Mapua school colors | UE school colors | Letran school colors | UP school colors |

= Win; = OT win; = Loss; = OT loss

===== Results =====
| Team | Ateneo | La Salle | Letran | Mapúa | SBC | UE | Perpetual | UP | UST |
|---|---|---|---|---|---|---|---|---|---|
| Ateneo | | 59–62* | 55–51 | 78–75 | 61–63 | 79–73 | 62–60 | 69–60 | 65–63 |
| La Salle | — | | 80–73 | 61–67 | 63–69 | 65–67 | 75–67 | 64–50 | 78–70 |
| Letran | — | — | | 79–55 | 56–76 | 64–56 | 71–67 | 64–55 | 69–86 |
| Mapúa | — | — | — | | 61–77 | 82–86* | 59–63 | 61–56 | 61–80 |
| San Beda | — | — | — | — | | 91–57 | 74–55 | 73–63 | 70–54 |
| UE | — | — | — | — | — | | 76–83 | 72–62 | 64–67 |
| Perpetual | — | — | — | — | — | — | | 47–61 | 66–70 |
| UP | — | — | — | — | — | — | — | | 70–77 |
| UST | — | — | — | — | — | — | — | — | |

Legend: Blue = left column team win; Red = top row team win.
Matches with lighter background shading were decided after overtime.
- Number of asterisks (*) denotes the number of overtime periods.

==== Group B ====
===== Team standings =====
| Pos | Team | W | L | PCT | GB | Qualification |
|---|---|---|---|---|---|---|
| 1 | NU Bulldogs | 8 | 0 | 1.000 | — | Quarterfinals |
| 2 | San Sebastian Stags | 6 | 2 | .750 (Note: Head-to-head record: San Sebastian 1–0 FEU) | 2 | Quarterfinals |
| 3 | FEU Tamaraws | 6 | 2 | .750 | 2 | Quarterfinals |
| 4 | Benilde Blazers | 4 | 4 | .500 (Note: Head-to-head record: Benilde 1–0 Adamson) | 4 | Quarterfinals |
| 5 | Adamson Soaring Falcons | 4 | 4 | .500 | 4 | |
| 6 | JRU Heavy Bombers | 3 | 5 | .375 | 5 | |
| 7 | EAC Generals | 2 | 6 | .250 (Note: Head-to-head record: EAC 1–0 Arellano) | 6 | |
| 8 | Arellano Chiefs | 2 | 6 | .250 | 6 | |
| 9 | Lyceum Pirates | 1 | 7 | .125 | 7 | |

Rules for classification: 1) winning percentage; 2) head-to-head record; 3) head-to-head quotient; 4) overall quotient

===== Schedule =====
| Team ╲ Game | 1 | 2 | 3 | 4 | 5 | 6 | 7 | 8 |
|---|---|---|---|---|---|---|---|---|
| Adamson | Lyceum school colors | FEU school colors | EAC school colors | SSC-R school colors | NU school colors | CSB school colors | JRU school colors | Arellano school colors |
| Arellano | Lyceum school colors | NU school colors | CSB school colors | JRU school colors | EAC school colors | FEU school colors | SSC-R school colors | Adamson school colors |
| Benilde | EAC school colors | NU school colors | Arellano school colors | FEU school colors | SSC-R school colors | Adamson school colors | Lyceum school colors | JRU school colors |
| EAC | JRU school colors | CSB school colors | NU school colors | Adamson school colors | Lyceum school colors | Arellano school colors | SSC-R school colors | FEU school colors |
| FEU | NU school colors | Lyceum school colors | Adamson school colors | CSB school colors | JRU school colors | Arellano school colors | EAC school colors | SSC-R school colors |
| JRU | NU school colors | EAC school colors | Lyceum school colors | SSC-R school colors | Arellano school colors | FEU school colors | Adamson school colors | CSB school colors |
| Lyceum | Adamson school colors | Arellano school colors | FEU school colors | JRU school colors | EAC school colors | NU school colors | SSC-R school colors | CSB school colors |
| NU | JRU school colors | FEU school colors | Arellano school colors | EAC school colors | CSB school colors | SSC-R school colors | Lyceum school colors | Adamson school colors |
| San Sebastian | JRU school colors | NU school colors | Adamson school colors | CSB school colors | Lyceum school colors | EAC school colors | Arellano school colors | FEU school colors |

= Win; = OT win; = Loss; = OT loss

===== Results =====
| Team | AdU | AU | Benilde | EAC | FEU | JRU | Lyceum | NU | San Sebastian |
|---|---|---|---|---|---|---|---|---|---|
| Adamson | | 78–58 | 66–71 | 77–59 | 60–67 | 71–70 | 97–80 | 67–69 | 68–78 |
| Arellano | — | | 47–67 | 65–76 | 64–79 | 76–74 | 89–80 | 64–76 | 80–90 |
| Benilde | — | — | | 72–77* | 67–74 | 67–63 | 78–71 | 52–71 | 80–82 |
| EAC | — | — | — | | 61–76 | 55–63 | 47–59 | 52–93 | 68–83 |
| FEU | — | — | — | — | | 69–52 | 72–50 | 74–85 | 70–81 |
| JRU | — | — | — | — | — | | 83–70 | 48–99 | 79–65 |
| Lyceum | — | — | — | — | — | — | | 52–82 | 72–78 |
| NU | — | — | — | — | — | — | — | | 76–73 |
| San Sebastian | — | — | — | — | — | — | — | — | |

Legend: Blue = left column team win; Red = top row team win.
Matches with lighter background shading were decided after overtime.
- Number of asterisks (*) denotes the number of overtime periods.

=== Bracket ===
Quarterfinals
A1 | San Beda | 80
B4 | Benilde | 41
B2 | San Sebastian | 70
A3 | La Salle | 84
B1 | NU | 77
A4 | UST | 68
A2 | Ateneo | 74
B3 | FEU | 63

Semifinals
A1 | San Beda | 46
A3 | La Salle | 50
B1 | NU | 85
A2 | Ateneo | 68

Finals
A3 | La Salle | 54
B1 | NU | 64
Battle for third
A1 | San Beda | 55
A2 | Ateneo | 66

=== Quarterfinals ===
All times are local (UTC+8).

June 6
12:00 p.m.

Recap

| Ateneo Blue Eagles | 74–63 | FEU Tamaraws |
Scoring by quarter: 15–16, 15–17, 21–17, 23–13
| Pts: Greg Slaughter 29; Rebs: Greg Slaughter 11; Asts: Kiefer Ravena 7 | | Pts: Terrence Romeo 13; Rebs: Anthony Hargrove 9 Asts: RR Garcia 6 |

Filoil Flying V Arena, San Juan

June 6
1:45 p.m.

Recap

| San Beda Red Lions | 80–41 | Benilde Blazers |
Scoring by quarter: 22–4, 22–11, 13–15, 23–11
| Pts: Ola Adeogun 18; Rebs: dela Cruz, dela Rosa 6 each Asts: Baser Amer 6 | | Pts: Carlo Lastimosa 12; Rebs: Mark Romero 6 Asts: Carlo Lastimosa 2 |

Filoil Flying V Arena, San Juan

June 6
3:30 p.m.

Recap

| NU Bulldogs | 77–68 | UST Growling Tigers |
Scoring by quarter: 15–25, 22–13, 22–20, 18–10
| Pts: Bobby Ray Parks 23; Rebs: Emmanuel Mbe 13; Asts: Robin Roño 5 | | Pts: Aljon Mariano 16; Rebs: Jeric Fortuna 13; Asts: Fortuna, Teng 3 each |

Filoil Flying V Arena, San Juan

June 6
5:15 p.m.

Recap

| San Sebastian Stags | 70–84 | De La Salle Green Archers |
Scoring by quarter: 19–19, 24–23, 15–22, 12–20
| Pts: Ian Sangalang 17; Rebs: Sangalang, Abueva 8 each Asts: Abueva, Antipuesto 3 each | | Pts: Teng, Revilla 17 each Rebs: Norbert Torres 14; Asts: Norbert Torres 4 |

Filoil Flying V Arena, San Juan

=== Semifinals ===
All times are local (UTC+8).

June 9
1:45 p.m.

Recap

| San Beda Red Lions | 46–50 | De La Salle Green Archers |
Scoring by quarter: 13–16, 6–11, 12–8, 15–15
| Pts: Pascual J., Amer 10 each Rebs: Adeogun, Amer 6 each Asts: Baser Amer 3 | | Pts: Norbert Torres 12; Rebs: Norbert Torres 10; Asts: 3 players, 2 each |

Filoil Flying V Arena, San Juan

June 9
3:30 p.m.

Recap

| NU Bulldogs | 85–68 | Ateneo Blue Eagles |
Scoring by quarter: 25–16, 22–19, 21–16, 17–17
| Pts: Bobby Ray Parks 30; Rebs: 3 players, 6 each Asts: Gelo Alolino 6 | | Pts: Greg Slaughter 21; Rebs: Greg Slaughter 7 Asts: Juami Tiongson 4 |

Filoil Flying V Arena, San Juan

=== Battle for third ===
All times are local (UTC+8).

June 12
2:00 p.m.

| San Beda Red Lions | 55–66 | Ateneo Blue Eagles |

Filoil Flying V Arena, San Juan

=== Final round ===
All times are local (UTC+8).

Studio 23

June 12
4:00 p.m.

| De La Salle Green Archers | 54–64 | NU Bulldogs |

Filoil Flying V Arena, San Juan

== Juniors' division ==
=== Elimination round ===
==== Group A ====
===== Team standings =====
| Pos | Team | W | L | PCT | GB | Qualification |
|---|---|---|---|---|---|---|
| 1 | San Beda Red Cubs | 5 | 0 | 1.000 | — | Semifinals |
| 2 | Xavier Golden Stallions | 3 | 2 | .600 (Note: Head-to-head record: Xavier 1–0 LSGH) | 2 | Quarterfinals |
| 3 | La Salle Green Hills Greenies | 3 | 2 | .600 | 2 | |
| 4 | Adamson Baby Falcons | 2 | 3 | .400 (Note: Head-to-head record: UST 1–0 Adamson) | 3 | |
| 5 | UST Tiger Cubs | 2 | 3 | .400 | 3 | |
| 6 | Perpetual Junior Altas | 0 | 5 | .000 | 5 | |

Rules for classification: 1) winning percentage; 2) head-to-head record; 3) head-to-head quotient; 4) overall quotient

===== Schedule =====
| Team ╲ Game | 1 | 2 | 3 | 4 | 5 |
|---|---|---|---|---|---|
| Adamson | San Beda school colors | UST school colors | JRU school colors | UPHD school colors | CSB school colors |
| LSGH | UPHD school colors | JRU school colors | UST school colors | Adamson school colors | San Beda school colors |
| San Beda | Adamson school colors | UPHD school colors | JRU school colors | UST school colors | CSB school colors |
| Perpetual | JRU school colors | CSB school colors | San Beda school colors | UST school colors | Adamson school colors |
| UST | Adamson school colors | UPHD school colors | JRU school colors | CSB school colors | San Beda school colors |
| Xavier | UPHD school colors | CSB school colors | Adamson school colors | UST school colors | San Beda school colors |

= Win; = Loss

===== Results =====
| Team | AdU | Benilde | Perpetual | SBC | UST | Xavier |
|---|---|---|---|---|---|---|
| Adamson | | 52–73 | 99–90 | 52–90 | 57–61 | 75–63 |
| Benilde | — | | 90–75 | 60–66 | 60–48 | 46–53 |
| Perpetual | — | — | | 66–122 | 79–84 | 74–83 |
| San Beda | — | — | — | | 80–60 | 64–63 |
| UST | — | — | — | — | | 62–63 |
| Xavier | — | — | — | — | — | |

Legend: Blue = left column team win; Red = top row team win.
Matches with lighter background shading were decided after overtime.

==== Group B ====
===== Team standings =====
| Pos | Team | W | L | PCT | GB | Qualification |
|---|---|---|---|---|---|---|
| 1 | UPIS Junior Fighting Maroons | 4 | 1 | .800 (Note: Head-to-head record: UPIS 1–0 NU) | — | Quarterfinals |
| 2 | NUNS Bullpups | 4 | 1 | .800 | — | Quarterfinals |
| 3 | Mapúa Red Robins | 3 | 2 | .600 | 1 | |
| 4 | FEU–D Baby Tamaraws | 2 | 3 | .400 (Note: Head-to-head record: FEU–D 1–0 Arellano) | 2 | |
| 5 | Arellano Braves | 2 | 3 | .400 | 2 | |
| 6 | JRU Light Bombers | 0 | 5 | .000 | 4 | |

Rules for classification: 1) winning percentage; 2) head-to-head record; 3) head-to-head quotient; 4) overall quotient

===== Schedule =====
| Team ╲ Game | 1 | 2 | 3 | 4 | 5 |
|---|---|---|---|---|---|
| Arellano | UP school colors | Mapua school colors | NU school colors | JRU school colors | FEU school colors |
| FEU–D | JRU school colors | UP school colors | Mapua school colors | Arellano school colors | NU school colors |
| JRU | FEU school colors | NU school colors | Arellano school colors | UP school colors | Mapua school colors |
| Malayan | UP school colors | Arellano school colors | FEU school colors | NU school colors | JRU school colors |
| NU | JRU school colors | Arellano school colors | Mapua school colors | FEU school colors | UP school colors |
| UPIS | Arellano school colors | Mapua school colors | FEU school colors | JRU school colors | NU school colors |

= Win; = OT win; = Win by forfeit; = Loss; = OT loss; = Loss by forfeit

===== Results =====
| Team | AU | FEU–F | JRU | MHSS | NU | UPIS |
|---|---|---|---|---|---|---|
| Arellano | | 60–67 | 67–57 | 62–67* | 66–80 | 58–50 |
| FEU–FERN | — | | 93–60 | 52–66 | 57–59 | 56–59 |
| JRU | — | — | | 43–82 | 54–83 | 42–51 |
| MHSS | — | — | — | | 55–81 | 76–77** |
| NU | — | — | — | — | | ~~62–52~~ (Note: Loss by forfeit) |
| UPIS | — | — | — | — | — | |

Legend: Blue = left column team win; Red = top row team win.
Matches with lighter background shading were decided after overtime.
Notes:

* Number of asterisks (*) denotes the number of overtime periods.

==== Group C ====
===== Team standings =====
| Pos | Team | W | L | PCT | GB | Qualification |
|---|---|---|---|---|---|---|
| 1 | Letran Squires | 5 | 0 | 1.000 | — | Semifinals |
| 2 | San Sebastian Staglets | 4 | 1 | .800 | 1 | Quarterfinals |
| 3 | Ateneo Blue Eaglets | 3 | 2 | .600 | 2 | |
| 4 | Zobel Junior Archers | 2 | 3 | .400 | 3 | |
| 5 | EAC–ICA Brigadiers | 1 | 4 | .200 | 4 | |
| 6 | Lyceum Junior Pirates | 0 | 5 | .000 | 5 | |

Rules for classification: 1) winning percentage; 2) head-to-head record; 3) head-to-head quotient; 4) overall quotient

===== Schedule =====
| Team ╲ Game | 1 | 2 | 3 | 4 | 5 |
|---|---|---|---|---|---|
| Ateneo | Lyceum school colors | EAC school colors | Letran school colors | SSC-R school colors | La Salle school colors |
| La Salle Zobel | Lyceum school colors | SSC-R school colors | EAC school colors | Letran school colors | Ateneo school colors |
| EAC–IAC | Ateneo school colors | Letran school colors | SSC-R school colors | La Salle school colors | Lyceum school colors |
| Letran | Lyceum school colors | EAC school colors | Ateneo school colors | La Salle school colors | SSC-R school colors |
| Lyceum | Ateneo school colors | Letran school colors | La Salle school colors | SSC-R school colors | EAC school colors |
| San Sebastian | EAC school colors | Ateneo school colors | La Salle school colors | Lyceum school colors | Letran school colors |

= Win; = Loss

===== Results =====
| Team | ADMU | DLSZ | Letran | EAC–IAC | Lyceum | San Sebastian |
|---|---|---|---|---|---|---|
| Ateneo | | 75–63 | 88–103 | 97–54 | 118–54 | 58–84 |
| DLSZ | — | | 67–80 | 98–67 | 113–27 | 58–64 |
| Letran | — | — | | 118–51 | 108–48 | 57–51 |
| EAC–IAC | — | — | — | | 88–54 | 40–87 |
| Lyceum | — | — | — | — | | 18–114 |
| San Sebastian | — | — | — | — | — | |

Legend: Blue = left column team win; Red = top row team win.
Matches with lighter background shading were decided after overtime.

=== Bracket ===
Quarterfinals
3 | San Sebastian | 71
6 | Xavier | 72
4 | UP | 55
5 | NU | 73

Semifinals
1 | Letran | 87
6 | Xavier | 82
2 | San Beda | 79
5 | NU | 60

Finals
1 | Letran | 77
2 | San Beda | 79
Third place
6 | Xavier | 60
5 | NU | 72

=== Quarterfinals ===
All times are local (UTC+8).

June 6
8:30 a.m.

| San Sebastian Staglets | 71–72 | Xavier Golden Stallions |

Filoil Flying V Arena, San Juan

June 6
10:15 a.m.

| UPIS Junior Fighting Maroons | 55–73 | NUNS Bullpups |

Filoil Flying V Arena, San Juan

=== Semifinals ===
All times are local (UTC+8).

June 9
10:15 a.m.

| San Beda Red Cubs | 79–60 | NUNS Bullpups |

Filoil Flying V Arena, San Juan

June 9
12:00 p.m.

| Letran Squires | 87–82 | Xavier Golden Stallions |

Filoil Flying V Arena, San Juan

=== Battle for third ===
All times are local (UTC+8).

June 12
10:00 a.m.

| Xavier Golden Stallions | 60–72 | NUNS Bullpups |

Filoil Flying V Arena, San Juan

=== Final round ===
All times are local (UTC+8).

June 12
12:00 p.m.

| San Beda Red Cubs | 79–77 | Letran Squires |

Filoil Flying V Arena, San Juan

== See also ==
- Shakey's V-League 9th Season 1st Conference
