= 2012 UST Growling Tigers basketball team =

2012 UST Growling Tigers men's basketball

UAAP Season 75 runner-up

Record
- Elims rank: #2
- Final rank: #2
- 2012 record: 11–6 (10–4 elims)
- Head coach: Pido Jarencio (7th season)
- Assistant coaches: Estong Ballesteros; Senen Dueñas
- Captain: Jeric Fortuna (5th season)

The 2012 UST Growling Tigers men's basketball team represented University of Santo Tomas in the 75th season of the University Athletic Association of the Philippines. The men's basketball tournament for the school year 2012-2013 began on July 14, 2012 and the host school for the season was National University.

The Tigers made it back to the Finals for the first time since winning the championship in 2006 after finishing the double round-robin eliminations at second place with 10 wins against 4 losses. They defeated the NU Bulldogs who had qualified to the Final Four for the first time in 11 years, and lost to the Ateneo Blue Eagles in the best-of-three championship series via sweep, making their opponents five-peat champions of the tournament.

UST later won the Philippine Collegiate Champions League title in December and avenged their UAAP Finals loss to Ateneo by beating them in a best-of-three series, 2-1.

Jeric Teng, who was named PCCL's tournament MVP missed three games in the elimination round of the UAAP due to an MCL injury in August, while PCCL Coach of the year Pido Jarencio missed Game One of the PCCL Finals when he got infected with measles.

== Roster ==
UST Growling Tigers roster
Players
Coaches

Pos.	No.	Nat.	Name	Height	Year	High School
SF	5	(Philippines)	Kim Kaizen Lo	6'1" (1.85m)	3rd	St. Jude Catholic School
SG	6	(Philippines)	Eduardo Daquioag, Jr.	6'1" (1.85m)	2nd	RTU Laboratory High School
PG	7	(Philippines)	Jeric Marco Fortuna (C)	5'7" (1.7m)	5th	De La Salle Santiago Zobel School
PF	8	(Philippines)	Carmelo Afuang	6'4" (1.93m)	5th	San Beda College–Rizal
SG	9	(Philippines)	Clark Daniel Oliver Bautista	5'9" (1.75m)	4th	Benedictine International School
SF	10	(Philippines)	Aljon Mariano	6'3" (1.91m)	3rd	San Beda College–Rizal
PG	11	(Philippines)	Robin Allan Tan	5'7" (1.7m)	2nd	Xavier School
PG	12	(Philippines)	Janrey Garrido	5'6" (1.68m)	1st	Hope Christian High School
C	13	(Philippines)	Paulo Lorenzo Pe	6'4" (1.93m)	3rd	Ateneo de Manila
PF	14	(Philippines)	Kevin Ferrer	6'4" (1.93m)	2nd	University of Santo Tomas
C	15	(Philippines)	Roberto Hainga	6'7" (2.01m)	3rd	Iloilo Central Commercial High School
SG	16	(Philippines)	Jeric Allen Teng	6'2" (1.88m)	4th	Xavier School
SG	17	(Philippines)	Christian Errol Villar	6'0" (1.83m)	1st	Hope Christian High School
SF	18	(Philippines)	Louie Philippe Vigil	6'3" (1.91m)	2nd	José Rizal University
C	19	(Philippines)	Kenneth Mamaril	6'5" (1.96m)	2nd	San Sebastian College-Recoletos
C	20	(Cameroon)	Karim Abdul	6'6" (1.98m)	2nd	Sta. Clara International Academy

Head coach

- (Philippines) Alfredo Jarencio

Assistant coach(es)

- Senen Dueñas
- Ernesto Ballesteros
- Segundo dela Cruz, III
- Alvin Grey
- Christopher Cantonjos
- Ma. Genevieve Francisco
- Rodil Sablan

Strength & conditioning coach(es)

- Emmanuel Calipes
- Yi Ming Liu
- Kris Anthony Agarao

Team manager

- Clarence Aytona

Legend

- (C) Team captain
- Injured

- Roster

=== Depth chart ===
Pos.	Starting 5	Bench 1	Bench 2
C	Abdul	Pe	Hainga
PF	Ferrer	Afuang
SF	Mariano	Lo	Daquioag
SG	Teng	Vigil	Tan
PG	Fortuna	Bautista	Garrido

== Roster changes ==
=== Subtractions ===
Pos.	No.	Nat.	Player	Height	Year	High school	Notes
SF	4	(Philippines)	Ron Kristoffer Javier	6' 1"	2nd	University of Santo Tomas	Transferred to Adamson University
PG	6	(Canada)	Sheak Jamil Sheriff, Jr.	5' 9"	2nd	Loyola Catholic Secondary School	Out on injury
SG	9	(Philippines)	Jaypee Sarcia		2nd	University of Santo Tomas	Relegated to Team B
SG	10	(Philippines)	Aljohn Gil Ungria	6' 1"	3rd	Colegio de San Lorenzo	Relegated to Team B
PF	12	(United States)	Christopher Camus	6' 4"	5th	Sunny Hills High School	Graduated
SG	17	(Philippines)	Eduardo Aytona, Jr.	5' 10"	4th	University of Santo Tomas	Relegated to Team B
SF	19	(Philippines)	Kent Jefferson Lao	6' 4"	2nd	Saint Stephen's High School	On leave–with Men's U-18 national team

=== Additions ===
Pos.	No.	Nat.	Player	Height	Year	High school	Notes
SG	6	(Philippines)	Eduardo Daquioag, Jr.	6' 1"	2nd	RTU Laboratory High School	Returning from Season 73
SG	9	(Philippines)	Clark Daniel Oliver Bautista	5' 9"	4th	Benedictine International School	Returning from Season 73
SF	10	(Philippines)	Aljon Mariano	6' 3"	3rd	San Beda College–Rizal	Returning from Season 73
PG	12	(Philippines)	Janrey Garrido	5' 6"	1st	Hope Christian High School	Rookie
C	15	(Philippines)	Roberto Hainga	6' 7"	3rd	Iloilo Central Commercial High School	Transferred from University of Perpetual Help
SG	17	(Philippines)	Christian Errol Villar	6' 0"	1st	Hope Christian High School	Rookie
C	19	(Philippines)	Kenneth Mamaril	6' 5"	2nd	San Sebastian College-Recoletos	Returning from Season 73

== Schedule and results ==
=== Preseason tournaments ===
The Tigers participated in only one offseason tournament, the 2012 Filoil Flying V Preseason Hanes Cup, where they advanced to the quarterfinal round but bid goodbye in the tournament after losing to the NU Bulldogs 68–77.

The Filoil Flying V Preseason Premier Cup games were aired on Studio 23.

Preseason game log

2012 Filoil Flying V Preseason Hanes Cup: 5–4
Game	Date • Time	Opponent	Result	Record	High points	High rebounds	High assists	Location
1	Apr 18 • 5:15 pm	San Beda Red Lions	L 54–70	0–1	Ferrer (13)	Abdul (8)	Tied (2)	Filoil Flying V Arena; San Juan
2	Apr 23 • 1:45 pm	Perpetual Altas	W 70–66	1–1	Tied (14)	Abdul (12)	Teng (3)	Filoil Flying V Arena; San Juan
3	Apr 25 • 5:15 pm	Ateneo Blue Eagles	L 63–65	1–2	Mariano (18)	Ferrer (9)	Teng (5)	Filoil Flying V Arena; San Juan
4	May 5 • 5:15 pm	De La Salle Green Archers	L 70–78	1–3	Mariano (19)	Ferrer (10)	Fortuna (5)	Filoil Flying V Arena; San Juan
5	May 16 • 3:30 pm	Mapúa Cardinals	W 80–61	2–3	Tied (15)	Abdul (15)	Teng (3)	Filoil Flying V Arena; San Juan
6	May 25 • 3:30 pm	UE Red Warriors	W 67–64	3–3	Mariano (18)	Abdul (12)	Tied (2)	Filoil Flying V Arena; San Juan
7	May 28 • 3:30 pm	Letran Knights	W 86–69	4–3	Abdul (18)	Abdul (7)	Mariano (6)	Filoil Flying V Arena; San Juan
8	Jun 2 • 11:00 am	UP Fighting Maroons	W 77–70	5–3	Mariano (26)	Mariano (10)	Fortuna (6)	Filoil Flying V Arena; San Juan
9	Jun 6 • 3:30 pm	NU Bulldogs; Quarterfinal round	L 68–77	5–4	Mariano (16)	Fortuna (13)	Tied (3)	Filoil Flying V Arena; San Juan

(#) Tournament seedings in parentheses.
All times are in UTC+08:00.

=== UAAP games ===
Elimination games were played in a double round-robin format. All games were aired on Studio 23 and Balls. The first game of the Finals series was aired on ABS-CBN and Balls.

UAAP Season 75 game log

Elimination round: 10–4
Game	Date • Time	Opponent	Result	Record	High points	High rebounds	High assists	Location
1	Jul 14 • 4:00 pm	FEU Tamaraws	L 72–73	0–1	Abdul (24)	Abdul (16)	Fortuna (6)	Mall of Asia Arena; Pasay
2	Jul 19 • 2:00 pm	Ateneo Blue Eagles	W 71–70	1–1	Mariano (21)	Mariano (13)	Bautista (3)	Smart Araneta Coliseum; Quezon City
3	Jul 28 • 11:00 am	NU Bulldogs	W 77–71	2–1	Teng (21)	Abdul (15)	Fortuna (6)	Mall of Asia Arena; Pasay
	Jul 21 • 4:00 pm	UP Fighting Maroons	Postponed due to Typhoon Ferdie					Mall of Asia Arena; Pasay
4	Aug 4 • 2:00 pm	De La Salle Green Archers	W 84–82^{2OT}	3–1	Bautista (21)	Abdul (16)	Fortuna (7)	Mall of Asia Arena; Pasay
	Aug 8 • 4:00 pm	UE Red Warriors	Postponed due to Typhoon Helen					Smart Araneta Coliseum; Quezon City
	Aug 11 • 2:00 pm	Adamson Soaring Falcons	Postponed due to Typhoon Helen					PhilSports Arena; Pasig
5	Aug 12 • 4:00 pm	UE Red Warriors	W 85–69	4–1	Abdul (20)	Abdul (19)	Fortuna (5)	Smart Araneta Coliseum; Quezon City
6	Aug 15 • 4:00 pm	UP Fighting Maroons	W 68–58	5–1	Abdul (20)	Abdul (12)	Bautista (4)	Smart Araneta Coliseum; Quezon City
7	Aug 19 • 2:00 pm	Adamson Soaring Falcons; End of R1 of eliminations	W 61–60	6–1	Abdul (18)	Abdul (12)	Fortuna (7)	Smart Araneta Coliseum; Quezon City
8	Aug 23 • 4:00 pm	FEU Tamaraws	L 60–87	6–2	Mariano (15)	Abdul (9)	Fortuna (6)	Mall of Asia Arena; Pasay
9	Aug 26 • 4:00 pm	NU Bulldogs	W 58–57^{OT}	7–2	Mariano (22)	Abdul (10)	Fortuna (8)	Mall of Asia Arena; Pasay
10	Aug 29 • 12:00 pm	De La Salle Green Archers	L 51–53	7–3	Abdul (14)	Tied (6)	Fortuna (5)	Mall of Asia Arena; Pasay
11	Sep 1 • 12:00 pm	Adamson Soaring Falcons	W 83–79	8–3	Teng (22)	Mariano (12)	Fortuna (7)	Smart Araneta Coliseum; Quezon City
12	Sep 8 • 2:00 pm	UP Fighting Maroons	W 75–68	9–3	Tied (16)	Abdul (21)	Fortuna (4)	Mall of Asia Arena; Pasay
13	Sep 15 • 4:00 pm	Ateneo Blue Eagles	L 66–68	9–4	Abdul (22)	Abdul (12)	Fortuna (5)	Mall of Asia Arena; Pasay
14	Sep 20 • 2:00 pm	UE Red Warriors; End of R2 of eliminations	W 87–75	10–4	Teng (26)	Abdul (9)	Fortuna (7)	Mall of Asia Arena; Pasay

Final Four: 1–0
Game	Date • Time	Seed	Opponent	Result	Series	High points	High rebounds	High assists	Location
1	Sep 29 • 12:00 pm	(#2)	(#3) NU Bulldogs	W 63–57	1–0 (11–4)	Ferrer (17)	Abdul (8)	Mariano (4)	Smart Araneta Coliseum; Quezon City

Finals: 0–2
Game	Date • Time	Seed	Opponent	Result	Series	High points	High rebounds	High assists	Location
1	Oct 6 • 3:00 pm	(#2)	(#1) Ateneo Blue Eagles	L 78–83	0–1 (11–5)	Teng (25)	Mariano (12)	Mariano (5)	Mall of Asia Arena; Pasay
2	Oct 11 • 3:00 pm	(#2)	(#1) Ateneo Blue Eagles	L 62–65	0–2 (11–6)	Fortuna (20)	Abdul (12)	Fortuna (6)	Smart Araneta Coliseum; Quezon City

(#) Tournament seedings in parentheses.
All times are in UTC+08:00.
Source: HumbleBola

=== Postseason tournament ===
Postseason game log

2012 Philippine Collegiate Champions League: 6–2
Game	Date • Time	Opponent	Result	Record	High points	High rebounds	High assists	Location
1	Nov 17 • 4:00 pm	Letran Knights; Luzon-NCR Main draw bracket	W 78–73	1–0	Fortuna (19)			Filoil Flying V Arena; San Juan
2	Nov 18 • 4:00 pm	Adamson Soaring Falcons; Luzon-NCR Main draw bracket	W 88–64	2–0	Mariano (20)			Filoil Flying V Arena; San Juan
3	Nov 20 • 4:00 pm	Ateneo Blue Eagles; Final Four round-robin	W 76–66	3–0	Teng (22)			Filoil Flying V Arena; San Juan
4	Nov 23 • 4:00 pm	San Beda Red Lions; Final Four round-robin	W 63–60	4–0	Mariano (16)			Filoil Flying V Arena; San Juan
5	Nov 24 • 2:00 pm	SWU Cobras; Final Four round-robin	L 91–93^{OT}	4–1	Teng (20)			Filoil Flying V Arena; San Juan
6	Nov 27 • 4:00 pm	Ateneo Blue Eagles; Finals	W 82–76	5–1	Ferrer (18)			Filoil Flying V Arena; San Juan
7	Nov 29 • 4:00 pm	Ateneo Blue Eagles; Finals	L 69–70	5–2	Fortuna (18)			Filoil Flying V Arena; San Juan
8	Dec 7 • 4:00 pm	Ateneo Blue Eagles; Finals	W 81–76	6–2	Teng (22)			Filoil Flying V Arena; San Juan

(#) Tournament seedings in parentheses.
All times are in UTC+08:00.

== UAAP statistics ==
Player	GP	GS	MPG	FGM	FGA	FG%	3PM	3PA	3P%	FTM	FTA	FT%	RPG	APG	SPG	BPG	TOV	PPG
Karim Abdul	14	14	34.6	89	189	47.1	0	0	0.0	59	90	65.6	12.2	1.9	1.5	2.0	3.1	16.9
Jeric Teng	11	11	28.4	53	139	38.1	23	61	37.7	21	31	67.7	4.3	1.1	0.6	0.0	1.9	13.6
Aljon Mariano	14	10	28.8	73	172	42.4	9	25	36.0	31	49	63.3	7.1	2.0	0.8	0.7	3.0	13.3
Tata Bautista	14	0	24.3	40	122	32.8	26	92	28.3	15	20	75.0	2.9	1.8	0.6	0.1	0.9	8.6
Jeric Fortuna	14	14	33.8	46	129	35.7	7	44	15.9	18	22	81.8	5.1	5.5	1.1	0.0	1.7	8.4
Kevin Ferrer	14	2	20.9	26	86	30.2	11	45	24.4	9	19	47.4	4.6	1.2	0.5	0.6	1.0	5.1
Louie Vigil	12	5	6.8	13	30	43.3	3	9	33.3	4	9	44.4	1.3	0.3	0.3	0.1	0.6	2.9
Melo Afuang	14	5	17.3	14	46	30.4	0	0	0.0	3	9	33.3	2.9	0.8	0.1	0.0	0.4	2.2
Kim Lo	14	8	7.7	11	28	39.3	0	4	0.0	5	8	62.5	1.1	0.5	0.4	0.0	0.6	1.9
Ed Daquioag	11	1	4.4	4	17	23.5	2	9	22.2	1	1	100.0	0.5	0.2	0.0	0.0	0.4	1.0
Paolo Pe	14	0	5.6	5	11	45.5	0	0	0.0	0	0	0.0	1.1	0.1	0.1	0.0	0.3	0.7
Janrey Garrido	2	0	1.5	0	0	0.0	0	0	0.0	1	2	50.0	0.0	0.0	0.0	0.0	1.0	0.5
Robert Hainga	3	0	1.7	0	0	0.0	0	0	0.0	0	0	0.0	0.3	0.0	0.0	0.3	0.0	0.0
Robin Tan	1	0	5.0	0	0	0.0	0	0	0.0	0	0	0.0	1.0	2.0	0.0	0.0	1.0	0.0
Total	14		41.1	375	969	38.7	81	292	27.7	167	260	64.2	44.2	15.1	6.0	3.6	14.9	71.3
Opponents	14		41.1	346	896	38.6	80	269	29.7	198	296	66.9	42.6	15.6	3.9	5.2	17.3	69.3

Legend
GP	Games played	GS	Games started	MPG	Minutes per game
FGM	Field-goal made	FGA	Field-goal attempts	FG%	Field-goal percentage
3PM	3-point field-goal made	3PA	3-point field-goal attempts	3P%	3-point field-goal percentage
FTM	Free-throw made	FTA	Free-throw attempts	FT%	Free-throw percentage
RPG	Rebounds per game	APG	Assists per game	SPG	Steals per game
BPG	Blocks per game	TOV	Turnovers per game	PPG	Points per game

Source: HumbleBola

== Awards ==
Name	Award	Date	Ref.
Team	UAAP runners-up	11 Oct 2012	
Team	2012 PCCL champions	7 Dec 2012	
Jeric Teng	2012 PCCL MVP	7 Dec 2012	
Jeric Teng	2012 PCCL Mythical team	7 Dec 2012	
Jeric Fortuna	2012 PCCL Mythical team	7 Dec 2012	
Pido Jarencio	2012 PCCL Coach of the Year	7 Dec 2012	
Karim Abdul	2012 PCCL Mythical team	7 Dec 2012	
Karim Abdul	UAAP Season 75 Mythical team	11 Oct 2012	

== Players drafted into the PBA ==
Jeric Fortuna was picked 14th overall in the second round of the 2013 PBA draft by the Bong Ramos-led Barako Bull Energy Cola team on November 3, 2013.

Year	Round	Pick	Overall	Player	PBA team
2013	2	4	14	Jeric Fortuna	Barako Bull Energy Cola
