= Aljon Mariano =

Filipino basketball player

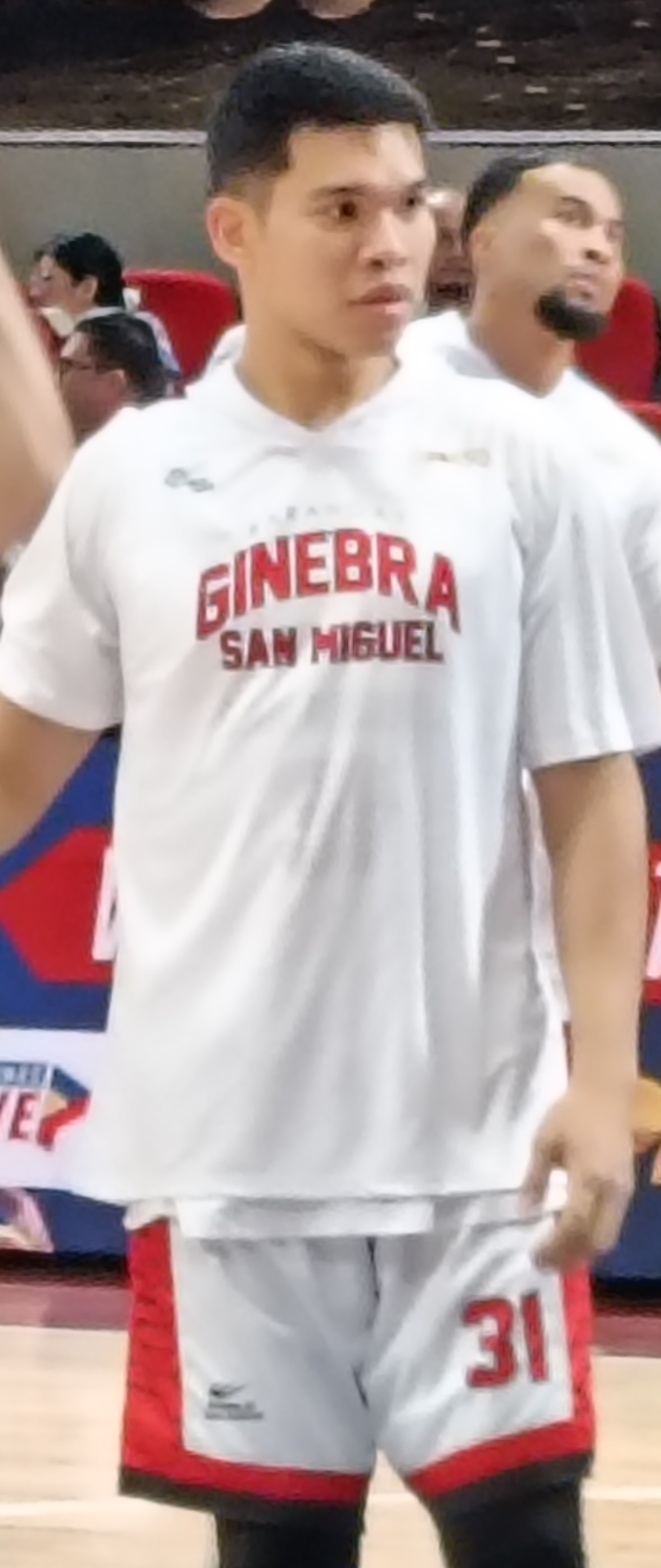
- Mariano with the Barangay Ginebra San Miguel in 2025

No. 10 – Terrafirma Dyip
- Position: Small forward / power forward
- League: PBA

Personal information
- Born: August 3, 1992 (age 34) Mandaluyong, Philippines
- Listed height: 6 ft 3 in (1.91 m)
- Listed weight: 175 lb (79 kg)

Career information
- High school: San Beda (Manila)
- College: UST (2009–2014)
- PBA draft: 2015: 2nd round, 16th overall pick
- Drafted by: Barangay Ginebra San Miguel
- Playing career: 2015–present

Career history
- 2015–2025: Barangay Ginebra San Miguel
- 2025–present: Terrafirma Dyip

Career highlights
- 7× PBA champion (2016 Governors', 2017 Governors', 2018 Commissioner's, 2019 Governors', 2020 Philippine, 2021 Governors', 2022–23 Commissioner's); PCCL champion (2012)

Aljon Escalona Mariano (born August 3, 1992) is a Filipino professional basketball player for the Terrafirma Dyip of the Philippine Basketball Association (PBA). He was drafted with the 16th overall pick in the 2015 PBA draft by the Barangay Ginebra San Miguel, with whom he has won 7 PBA titles.

== High school career ==
Mariano played for Ato Badolato with the San Beda Red Cubs. When he was 13 years old, he was part of the first batch that joined the Jr. NBA program. He also participated in the Nike Elite Camp and played in the NBTC League.

== College career ==
=== Rookie season ===
Mariano joined the Tigers in 2009. Mariano played limited minutes with the Tigers during his first season with the team.

=== Second season ===
In his second season, Mariano became a starter for the Tigers, while averaging 7.1 points per game and 3.1 rebounds per game. Unfortunately, the inexperienced Tigers failed to return to the Final Four and finished 7th in the standings at 4–10 ahead of the last place UP Fighting Maroons.

=== Injury and return ===
Mariano sat out the entire season in UAAP Season 74 due to a fractured ankle which kept him out of action for 6 months.

Mariano returned to the Tigers the following season. In a game against the Ateneo Blue Eagles, Mariano scored a career-high 21 points and 13 rebounds as he led the Tigers to snap a 12-game losing streak against the Blue Eagles 71–70. In a game against the De La Salle Green Archers, Mariano scored all of his 15 points in the 4th quarter and in the two overtime periods, including the game-winning basket with 7.1 seconds left as the Tigers defeat the Green Archers in double overtime 84–82. Then in their second round meeting against the NU Bulldogs, Mariano set another career-high 22 points, including the game winner with 4.4 seconds left in overtime as he led the Tigers to an overtime victory against the Bulldogs 58–57. The Tigers were able to advance to the UAAP Final Four as the #2 seed with a 10–4 record in the elimination round, they were able to defeat the NU Bulldogs to advance to the UAAP Finals and faced off against the Ateneo Blue Eagles but were swept in the Finals 2–0 as the Blue Eagles completed their five-peat. Mariano finished the season averaging 13.3 points per game, 7.3 rebounds per game and 2.2 assists per game on 42% shooting from the field, 36% shooting from 3-point range and 67% free throw shooting.

In the Philippine Collegiate Champions League later that year, Mariano would play a key part in the Tigers run in the tournament as they first won the Metro Manila-Luzon tournament by defeating both the Letran Knights and the Adamson Soaring Falcons to enter into the PCCL Final Four with the Ateneo Blue Eagles, San Beda Red Lions and the Southwestern U Cobras. The Tigers would finish with a 2–1 record in the Final Four to set up a rematch with the Blue Eagles in the Finals, where the Tigers exacted their revenge against the Eagles as they were crowned the National Champions after winning the title in a tightly contested three-game series.

=== Fourth season ===
In his fourth season with the Tigers, Mariano fought through an ankle injury throughout the season as the Tigers struggled throughout the season after coming off their runner-up finish the previous season and their national championship run. Despite the injury, Mariano would be a key catalyst to the Tigers' run throughout the season as the Tigers made a stunning bid to return UAAP Finals where they battled the De La Salle Green Archers. Mariano however would struggle during the Finals against the Archers. In Game 3 of the Finals, he missed the title-clinching jumper that sent the game into overtime and would turn the ball over in the final moments that led to the title-clinching jumper by Almond Vosotros as the Archers won the title with a Game 3 win over the Tigers 71–69. Mariano ended the season averaging 11.4 points per game, 7.3 rebounds per game and 2.1 assists per game on 40% shooting from the field and 66% shooting from the free throw line.

=== Final season ===
In his final season with the Tigers, with new head coach Bong dela Cruz taking the helm from Pido Jarencio, Mariano was named the captain of the Tigers with the departure of Jeric Teng last season. However, the Tigers were riddled with injuries late in the season as Mariano ended his college playing career with the Tigers missing the Final Four. Mariano in his final season with the Tigers averaged 11 points per game, 5.5 rebounds per game, and 1.4 assists per game on 34% shooting from the field and 30% shooting from three-point range.

== Professional career ==
=== Barangay Ginebra San Miguel (2015–2025) ===
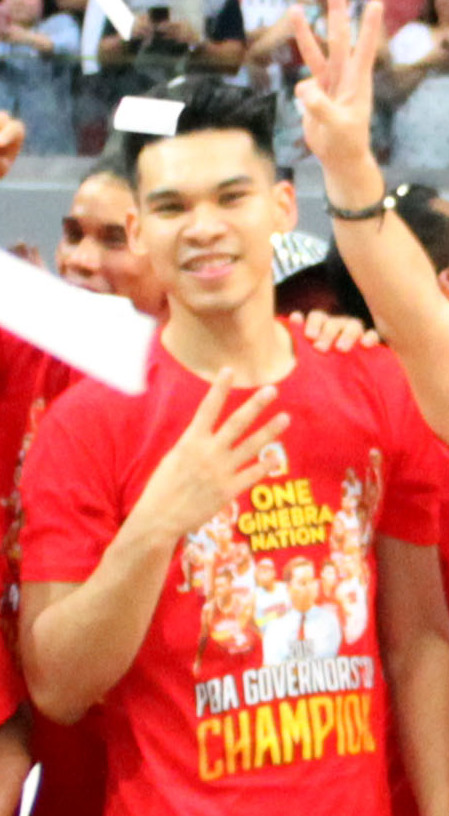
Mariano in 2020

On August 23, 2015, Mariano was drafted by the Barangay Ginebra San Miguel in the 2015 PBA draft as the sixteenth overall pick. He had his first start in a win over the Phoenix Fuel Masters during the 2016 Governors' Cup. They made the finals that conference, with him making contributions off the bench throughout the playoffs. Ginebra won the finals 4–2 for his first PBA title.

Mariano stepped up once again during the 2016–17 Philippine Cup playoffs, this time filling in for Joe Devance who was out due to injury. In a do-or-die match against the Alaska Aces in the quarterfinals, he scored a career-high 20 points to go with eight boards and one steal in 23 minutes off the bench as Ginebra moved on to the next round. Ginebra made it to the finals, where he started Game 1. Although Ginebra lost in that finals, they were able to defend their Governors' Cup title in 2017.

The following season, Mariano had more minutes, beginning in the Philippine Cup when he took advantage of minutes that would usually be given to Devance when healthy or Ginebra import Justin Brownlee for conferences with imports. Ginebra then won the 2018 Commissioner's Cup. During the 2018 Governors' Cup, Mariano tied his career-high of 20 points, making all seven of his shots along with seven rebounds in a win over the San Miguel Beermen as Ginebra missed several key players. Eventually, the injuries caught up to Ginebra that conference as they were unable to defend their Governors' Cup title. At the end of the 2017–18 season, he signed a contract extension for three more years.

During the 2019 season, Mariano tied his career-high of 20 points once again in a win over Phoenix. He had a limited role that season, averaging 11 minutes a game, but won another championship as Ginebra won the 2019 Governors' Cup.

The 2020 season saw Mariano take on a bigger role. In the first game of the season, a win over the NLEX Road Warriors, he matched his career-high for the third time in his career by scoring 20 points in 30 minutes. He was among eight locals who scored at least 10 points in a win over the NorthPort Batang Pier with 15 points, seven assists, and five rebounds as they secured a slot in the quarterfinals. With a win over the Terrafirma Dyip in which he had 17 points and 11 rebounds, Ginebra had the #1 seed for the playoffs. Ginebra made it to the finals that season against the TNT Tropang Giga. In Game 2, he had 20 points as his aggressiveness keyed Ginebra into the win. Ginebra eventually won the finals in six games, making this his fifth championship.

In the offseason, Mariano's contract was renewed. However, surgery for bone spurs placed him on injury reserve for the start of the 2021 Philippine Cup in July. He recovered quickly, and when the Philippine Cup restarted in August, he was able to get back into the lineup. Then, during the playoffs, he hurt his leg as Ginebra was eliminated in the first round. He returned a conference later, the 2021 Governors', returning to the roster during the quarterfinals and getting to play during the finals. Ginebra was able to win their fourth Governors' Cup title in six years during that conference. During the 2022–23 Commissioner's Cup, Mariano won his seventh PBA title.

Mariano missed the 2023–24 season due to an ankle injury that required arthroscopic surgery. During the 2024–25 season, he signed a two-year contract to stay with the team.

=== Terrafirma Dyip (2025–present) ===
On October 15, 2025, Mariano, along with Maverick Ahanmisi was traded to the Terrafirma Dyip in exchange for a 2027 first-round pick.

== Personal life ==
Mariano is married to Kayesha Chua, who he met at UST. She is a former flight attendant who took part in the 2018 Bb. Pilipinas pageant and 2019 Miss World Philippines. They have a son, Aden Karlos.

== PBA career statistics ==
Legend
GP	Games played	MPG	Minutes per game	FG%	Field-goal percentage
3FG%	3-point field-goal percentage	4P%	4-point field-goal percentage	FT%	Free-throw percentage
RPG	Rebounds per game	APG	Assists per game	SPG	Steals per game
BPG	Blocks per game	PPG	Points per game	127	Career high

As of the end of 2025–26 season

=== Season-by-season averages ===
Year	Team	GP	MPG	FG%	3P%	4P%	FT%	RPG	APG	SPG	BPG	PPG
2015–16	Barangay Ginebra	26	10.6	.460	.000	—	.429	2.6	.5	.1	.1	.3
2016–17	Barangay Ginebra	35	10.2	.462	.000	—	.610	2.6	.3	.2	.1	3.1
2017–18	Barangay Ginebra	42	14.9	.463	.250	—	.651	3.4	1.0	.3	.1	4.9
2019	Barangay Ginebra	45	11.1	.468	.000	—	.545	2.5	.9	.2	.1	3.2
2020	Barangay Ginebra	22	26.0	.455	.200	—	.754	6.1	2.0	.5	.3	8.5
2021	Barangay Ginebra	14	15.5	.442	.444	—	.400	2.6	.9	.3	.1	3.1
2022–23	Barangay Ginebra	55	11.3	.416	.258	—	.538	1.6	.6	.1	.1	2.7
2024–25	Barangay Ginebra	28	5.5	.415	.200	—	.625	1.1	.6	.0	—	1.4
2025–26	Terrafirma	21	17.3	.333	.265	.000	.652	3.4	1.0	.3	.1	4.8
Career		288	12.8	.436	.245	.000	.629	2.7	.8	.2	.1	3.6
