= UAAP Season 75 =

University athletic year

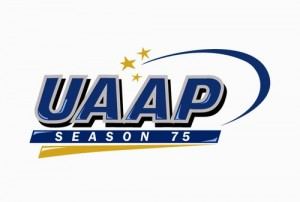
- "Unbreakable at 75"
- Host school: National University

Overall
- Seniors: De La Salle University
- Juniors: University of Santo Tomas

Seniors' champions
Sport		Men	Women
Basketball		Ateneo	FEU
Volleyball		NU	La Salle
Beach Volleyball		NU	UST
Football		Ateneo	FEU
Baseball		Ateneo	N/A
Softball		N/A	Adamson
Fencing		UE	UE
Swimming		Ateneo	UP
Badminton		NU	Ateneo
Chess		UST	La Salle
Judo		UST	UST
Taekwondo		UST	La Salle
Table tennis		UST	La Salle
Tennis		NU	La Salle
Track and field		FEU	FEU
- Cheerdance: UP (Ex - Coed)
- Street dance: UP (Ex - Coed)

Juniors' champions
Sport		Boys	Girls
Basketball		FEU–D	N/A
Volleyball		UE	La Salle
Beach Volleyball		FEU–D	
Football		Ateneo	
Baseball		-	
Softball		UE	UE
Fencing		Ateneo	UE
Swimming		FEU–D	
Badminton		UST	
Chess		UST	
Judo		NU	
Taekwondo		UP	
- (NT) = No tournament; (DS) = Demonstration Sport; (Ex) = Exhibition;

UAAP Season 75 was the 2012–2013 athletic year of the University Athletic Association of the Philippines (UAAP). The season's theme was "Unbreakable at 75" in relation to the league's diamond year. It was hosted by National University.

The men's basketball and the women's volleyball tournaments have been aired by ABS-CBN Channel 2 and Studio 23, the former for the thirteenth consecutive year and the latter since Season 69.

This season, the men's football and women's softball both became a seven-school tournament. National University made a comeback in these two events. NU was participating in these two events in the 1940s up to the 1950s. NU also fielded for the first time men's and women's teams in Taekwondo to also make these events a seven-school tournament. As seven-school tournaments, men's football and women's softball will now include the Final 4 in its format.

== Opening ceremony ==
The opening ceremony was held on July 14, 2012 at the Mall of Asia Arena in Pasay, Metro Manila.

== Basketball ==
The UAAP Season 75 basketball tournament began on July 14, 2012 at the Mall of Asia Arena, Pasay, Metro Manila. The tournament host was National University and tournament commissioner was Edmundo "Ato" Badolato.

The main venue of the basketball tournaments of season 75 was the newly constructed Mall of Asia Arena, which hosted at least 16 of 28 elimination round playing dates. The Smart Araneta Coliseum served as an alternate venue. PhilSports Arena also served as an alternative venue when the Mall of Asia Arena and Smart Araneta Coliseum were both unavailable. Games of the men's basketball tournament began after the opening ceremony.

=== Seniors division ===
==== Men's tournament ====
===== Elimination round =====
Pos	Team	W	L	PCT	GB	Qualification
1	Ateneo Blue Eagles	12	2	.857	—	Twice-to-beat in the semifinals
2	UST Growling Tigers	10	4	.714	2	Twice-to-beat in the semifinals
3	NU Bulldogs (H)	9	5	.643 (Note: Head-to-head record: NU 3–1, La Salle 2–2, FEU 1–3; fourth-seed playoff: La Salle 69–66 FEU)	3	Twice-to-win in the semifinals
4	De La Salle Green Archers	9	5	.643	3	Twice-to-win in the semifinals
5	FEU Tamaraws	9	5	.643	3	
6	Adamson Soaring Falcons	3	11	.214 (Note: Head-to-head record: Adamson 1–1 UE (Adamson +15))	9	
7	UE Red Warriors	3	11	.214	9	
8	UP Fighting Maroons	1	13	.071	11	

Source: ABS-CBN Sports
Rules for classification: 1) winning percentage; 2) if tied for #2 or #4, one-game playoff; 3) head-to-head record; 4) head-to-head point differential; 5) overall point differential
(H) Hosts

===== Playoffs =====
Semifinals (Top 2 twice-to-beat)
1	Ateneo	66
4	La Salle	63
2	UST	63
3	NU	57

Finals (Best-of-three playoff)
1	Ateneo	83	65
2	UST	78	62

===== Awards =====
- Most Valuable Player: Bobby Ray Parks Jr. (NU Bulldogs)
- Rookie of the Year: Jeron Teng (De La Salle Green Archers)

==== Women's tournament ====
===== Elimination round =====
Pos	Team	W	L	PCT	GB	Qualification
1	FEU Lady Tamaraws	14	0	1.000	—	Thrice-to-beat in the Finals (Note: As FEU won all of their elimination round games, the stepladder format will be used instead of the regular Final Four format.)
2	De La Salle Lady Archers	11	3	.786	3	Twice-to-beat in stepladder round 2
3	Adamson Lady Falcons	10	4	.714	4	Proceed to stepladder round 1
4	Ateneo Lady Eagles	7	7	.500 (Note: Fourth-seed playoff: Ateneo 50–48 NU)	7	Proceed to stepladder round 1
5	NU Lady Bulldogs	7	7	.500	7	
6	UST Growling Tigresses	5	9	.357	9	
7	UP Lady Maroons	2	12	.143	12	
8	UE Lady Warriors	0	14	.000	14	

Source: ABS-CBN Sports
Rules for classification: 1) winning percentage; 2) if tied for #2 or #4, one-game playoff; 3) head-to-head record; 4) head-to-head point differential; 5) overall point differential

===== Playoffs =====
Stepladder round 1 (Single-elimination)
3	Adamson	68
4	Ateneo	61

Stepladder round 2 (No. 2 twice-to-beat)
2	La Salle	81
3	Adamson	73

Finals (No. 1 thrice-to-beat)
1	FEU	64	70
2	La Salle	56	66

===== Awards =====
- Most Valuable Player: Allana May Lim (FEU Lady Tamaraws)
- Rookie of the Year: Princess Joy Cochico (Adamson Lady Falcons)

=== Juniors division ===
==== Boys' tournament ====
===== Elimination round =====
Pos	Team	W	L	PCT	GB	Qualification
1	FEU–D Baby Tamaraws	13	1	.929 (Note: Head-to-head record: FEU 1–1 NSNU (FEU +3))	—	Twice-to-beat in the semifinals
2	NUNS Bullpups	13	1	.929	—	Twice-to-beat in the semifinals
3	UST Tiger Cubs	10	4	.714	3	Twice-to-win in the semifinals
4	Ateneo Blue Eaglets	8	6	.571	5	Twice-to-win in the semifinals
5	Zobel Junior Archers	5	9	.357	8	
6	UPIS Junior Fighting Maroons	4	10	.286	9	
7	Adamson Baby Falcons	3	11	.214	10	
8	UE Junior Red Warriors	0	14	.000	13	

Source: ABS-CBN Sports
Rules for classification: 1) winning percentage; 2) if tied for #2 or #4, one-game playoff; 3) head-to-head record; 4) head-to-head point differential; 5) overall point differential

===== Playoffs =====
Semifinals (Top 2 twice-to-beat)
1	FEU–Diliman	70
4	Ateneo	67
2	NSNU	78
3	UST	66

Finals (Best-of-three playoff)
1	FEU–Diliman	78	113***
2	NSNU	77	109

***Triple overtime

===== Awards =====
- Most Valuable Player: Jerie Marlon Pingoy (FEU–D Baby Tamaraws)
- Rookie of the Year: Reggienal Morido (NUNS Bullpups)

== Volleyball ==
=== Seniors division ===
==== Men's tournament ====
===== Elimination round =====
Pos	Team	Pld	W	L	Pts	SW	SL	SR	SPW	SPL	SPR	Qualification
1	NU Bulldogs (H)	14	12	2	34 (Note: Head-to-head record: NU 1–1 FEU; NU +1)	38	15	2.533	1261	1144	1.102	Twice-to-beat in the semifinals
2	FEU Tamaraws	14	12	2	33	39	15	2.600	1266	1101	1.150	Twice-to-beat in the semifinals
3	De La Salle Green Archers	14	9	5	29 (Note: Head-to-head record: La Salle 2–0 Adamson)	32	18	1.778	1163	1055	1.102	Twice-to-win in the semifinals
4	Adamson Soaring Falcons	14	9	5	25	30	26	1.154	1242	1213	1.024	Twice-to-win in the semifinals
5	UST Growling Tigers	14	7	7	23	27	25	1.080	1175	1153	1.019	
6	Ateneo Blue Eagles	14	3	11	11 (Note: Head-to-head record: Ateneo 1–1 UP; Ateneo +1)	15	34	0.441	1011	1141	0.886	
7	UP Fighting Maroons	14	3	11	10	17	38	0.447	1144	1237	0.925	
8	UE Red Warriors	14	1	13	3	14	41	0.341	1105	1323	0.835	

Source: ABS-CBN Sports
Rules for classification: 1) number of wins; 2) if tied for #2 or #4, one-game playoff; 3) head-to-head record; 4) match points; 5) sets ratio; 6) points ratio
(H) Host

===== Playoffs =====
Semifinals (Nos. 1 & 2 have twice-to-beat advantage)
1	**NU**	**3**
4	Adamson	1
2	**FEU**	**3**
3	La Salle	0

Finals (Best-of-three series)
1	NU	**3**	1	**3**
2	FEU	2	**3**	1

===== Awards =====
- Most Valuable Player: Mark Gil Alfafara (UST Growling Tigers) and Red Christensen (De La Salle Green Archers)
- Rookie of the Year: Nikko Ramirez (Adamson Soaring Falcons)

==== Women's tournament ====
===== Elimination round =====
Pos	Team	Pld	W	L	Pts	SW	SL	SR	SPW	SPL	SPR	Qualification
1	De La Salle Lady Archers	14	13	1	38	41	7	5.857	1149	832	1.381	Twice-to-beat in the semifinals
2	Ateneo Lady Eagles	14	10	4	29	34	18	1.889	1166	1030	1.132	Twice-to-beat in the semifinals
3	Adamson Lady Falcons	14	9	5	26	32	22	1.455	1175	1073	1.095	Twice-to-win in the semifinals
4	NU Lady Bulldogs (H)	14	8	6	27 (Note: Head-to-head record: NU 1–1 UST; fourth-seed playoff: NU 3–1 UST)	31	21	1.476	1170	1066	1.098	Twice-to-win in the semifinals
5	UST Growling Tigresses	14	8	6	22	27	25	1.080	1122	1136	0.988	Qualified to fourth-seed playoff
6	FEU Lady Tamaraws	14	6	8	20	23	25	0.920	1031	999	1.032	
7	UP Lady Maroons	14	2	12	4	7	40	0.175	769	1118	0.688	
8	UE Lady Warriors	14	0	14	2	5	42	0.119	801	1129	0.709	

Source: ABS-CBN Sports
Rules for classification: 1) number of wins; 2) if tied for #2 or #4, one-game playoff; 3) head-to-head record; 4) match points; 5) sets ratio; 6) points ratio
(H) Host

===== Playoffs =====
Fourth-seed playoff (Knockout game)
**NU**	**3**
UST	1

Semifinals; Top seeds twice-to-beat
1	La Salle	**3**
4	NU	0
2	**Ateneo**	**3**
3	Adamson	0

Finals; Best-of-three series
1	**La Salle**	**3**	**3**
2	Ateneo	2	0

===== Awards =====
- Most Valuable Player: Victonara Galang and Abigail Maraño (De La Salle Lady Archers)
- Rookie of the Year: Aiko Urdas (NU Lady Bulldogs)

=== Juniors division ===
==== Boys' tournament ====
===== Elimination round =====
Rank	Team	W	L	Pts
1	UE Junior Red Warriors	5	0	15
2	**NUNS Bullpups**	4	1	12
3	UST Tiger Cubs	2	3	6
4	Ateneo Blue Eaglets	2	3	6
5	Zobel Junior Archers	1	4	3
6	UPIS Junior Fighting Maroons	1	4	3

Host team in boldface.

Qualified to the semifinals with a twice-to-beat advantage
Qualified to the semifinals

===== Awards =====
- Most Valuable Player: Edward Camposano (UE Junior Red Warriors)
- Rookie of the Year:

==== Girls' tournament ====
===== Elimination round =====
Rank	Team	W	L	Pts
1	Zobel Junior Lady Archers	3	1	9
2	**NUNS Lady Bullpups**	3	1	9
3	UST Junior Tigresses	2	2	6
4	UE Junior Lady Warriors	1	3	3
5	UPIS Junior Lady Maroons	1	3	3

Host team in boldface.

Qualified to the semifinals with a twice-to-beat advantage
Qualified to the semifinals

===== Awards =====
- Most Valuable Player: Alessandra Isabela Narciso (Zobel Junior Lady Archers)
- Rookie of the Year: Ejiya Laure (UST Junior Tigresses)

== Beach Volleyball ==
The UAAP Season 75 beach volleyball tournament began on August 25, 2012 at the sand courts of UE Caloocan.

=== Men's tournament ===
==== Elimination round ====
Team standings

Rank	Team	W	L	PCT	GB
1	NU Bulldogs	6	1	0.857	—
2	FEU Tamaraws	6	1	0.857	—
3	Adamson Soaring Falcons	5	2	0.714	1.0
4	De La Salle Green Archers	4	3	0.571	1.0
5	UE Red Warriors	3	4	0.429	3.0
6	UP Fighting Maroons	2	5	0.286	4.0
7	Ateneo Blue Eagles	1	6	0.143	5.0
8	UST Growling Tigers	1	6	0.143	5.0

Qualified to the semifinals with the twice-to-beat advantage
Qualified to the semifinals

Match-up results

Team ╲ Game	1	2	3	4	5	6	7
AdU	FEU school colors	NU school colors	UST school colors	Ateneo school colors	La Salle school colors	UE school colors	UP school colors
AdMU	UE school colors	UP school colors	La Salle school colors	Adamson school colors	UST school colors	FEU school colors	NU school colors
DLSU	NU school colors	FEU school colors	Ateneo school colors	UP school colors	Adamson school colors	UST school colors	UE school colors
FEU	Adamson school colors	La Salle school colors	UP school colors	UE school colors	NU school colors	Ateneo school colors	UST school colors
NU	La Salle school colors	Adamson school colors	UE school colors	UST school colors	FEU school colors	UP school colors	Ateneo school colors
UE	Ateneo school colors	UST school colors	NU school colors	FEU school colors	UP school colors	Adamson school colors	La Salle school colors
UP	UST school colors	Ateneo school colors	FEU school colors	La Salle school colors	UE school colors	NU school colors	Adamson school colors
UST	UP school colors	UE school colors	Adamson school colors	NU school colors	Ateneo school colors	La Salle school colors	FEU school colors

= Win; = Loss

==== Awards ====
- Most Valuable Player: Edwin Tolentino (NU Bulldogs)
- Rookie of the Year: Justin Roque (NU Bulldogs)

=== Women's tournament ===
==== Elimination round ====
Team standings

Rank	Team	W	L	PCT	GB
1	UST Growling Tigresses	7	0	1.000	—
2	De La Salle Lady Archers	6	1	.857	1.0
3	Adamson Lady Falcons	5	2	.714	2.0
4	UP Lady Maroons	4	3	.571	3.0
5	NU Lady Bulldogs	3	4	.429	4.0
6	UE Lady Warriors	1	6	.143	6.0
7	Ateneo Lady Eagles	1	6	.143	6.0
8	FEU Lady Tamaraws	1	6	.143	6.0

Qualified to the Finals with the thrice-to-beat advantage
Qualified to the semifinals with the twice-to-beat advantage
Qualified to the semifinals

Match-up results

Team ╲ Game	1	2	3	4	5	6	7
AdU	UST school colors	UP school colors	Ateneo school colors	NU school colors	FEU school colors	UE school colors	La Salle school colors
AdMU	La Salle school colors	UE school colors	Adamson school colors	UP school colors	NU school colors	FEU school colors	UST school colors
DLSU	Ateneo school colors	NU school colors	UST school colors	FEU school colors	UE school colors	UP school colors	Adamson school colors
FEU	UP school colors	UST school colors	NU school colors	La Salle school colors	Adamson school colors	Ateneo school colors	UE school colors
NU	UE school colors	La Salle school colors	FEU school colors	Adamson school colors	Ateneo school colors	UST school colors	UP school colors
UE	NU school colors	Ateneo school colors	UP school colors	UST school colors	La Salle school colors	Adamson school colors	FEU school colors
UP	FEU school colors	Adamson school colors	UE school colors	Ateneo school colors	UST school colors	La Salle school colors	NU school colors
UST	Adamson school colors	FEU school colors	La Salle school colors	UE school colors	UP school colors	NU school colors	Ateneo school colors

= Win; = Loss

==== Awards ====
- Most Valuable Player: Maru Banaticla (UST Growling Tigresses)
- Rookie of the Year:

== Football ==
The UAAP Season 75 football tournament began on December 2, 2012 at the football fields of the Ateneo de Manila University in Katipunan Avenue, Loyola Heights, Quezon City. Tournament host is Ateneo de Manila University.

=== Men's tournament ===
==== Elimination round ====
===== Team standings =====
Pos	Team	Pld	W	D	L	GF	GA	GD	Pts	Qualification
1	Ateneo Blue Eagles	12	8	3	1	13	4	+9	27	Twice-to-beat in the semifinals
2	UP Fighting Maroons	12	8	1	3	17	9	+8	25 (Note: Second-seed playoff: FEU 0–5 UP)	Twice-to-beat in the semifinals
3	FEU Tamaraws	12	8	1	3	35	8	+27	25	Twice-to-win in the semifinals
4	De La Salle Green Archers	12	8	0	4	25	9	+16	24	Twice-to-win in the semifinals
5	UST Growling Tigers	12	4	1	7	12	14	−2	13	
6	NU Bulldogs	12	2	1	9	5	29	−24	7	
7	UE Red Warriors	12	0	1	11	3	28	−25	1	

Source: ABS-CBN Sports

===== Match-up results =====
	Round 1						Round 2					
Team ╲ Game	1	2	3	4	5	6	7	8	9	10	11	12
AdMU	UE school colors	UST school colors	La Salle school colors	FEU school colors	NU school colors	UP school colors	UP school colors	UST school colors	UE school colors	FEU school colors	La Salle school colors	NU school colors
DLSU	FEU school colors	NU school colors	Ateneo school colors	UST school colors	UP school colors	UE school colors	UST school colors	UE school colors	FEU school colors	NU school colors	Ateneo school colors	UP school colors
FEU	La Salle school colors	UP school colors	Ateneo school colors	UE school colors	NU school colors	UST school colors	UE school colors	La Salle school colors	NU school colors	Ateneo school colors	UP school colors	UST school colors
NU	UST school colors	La Salle school colors	UP school colors	Ateneo school colors	FEU school colors	UE school colors	UP school colors	UST school colors	UE school colors	FEU school colors	La Salle school colors	Ateneo school colors
UE	Ateneo school colors	UP school colors	UST school colors	FEU school colors	La Salle school colors	NU school colors	FEU school colors	La Salle school colors	NU school colors	Ateneo school colors	UP school colors	UST school colors
UP	UE school colors	FEU school colors	NU school colors	La Salle school colors	UST school colors	Ateneo school colors	NU school colors	Ateneo school colors	UST school colors	UE school colors	FEU school colors	La Salle school colors
UST	NU school colors	Ateneo school colors	UE school colors	La Salle school colors	UP school colors	FEU school colors	La Salle school colors	NU school colors	Ateneo school colors	UP school colors	UE school colors	FEU school colors

= Win; = Draw; = Loss

==== Playoffs ====
Second seed playoff (One game playoff)
3	FEU	0
4	UP	2

Semifinals; Top seeds twice-to-beat
1	Ateneo	0 (4)^
4	La Salle	0 (3)
2	UP	1	2*
3	FEU	5	1

Finals; Best-of-three series
1	Ateneo	1 (4)^	0 (4)^
2	UP	1 (3)	0 (2)

==== Awards ====
- Most Valuable Player: Nicolas Michael O'Donnell (Ateneo Blue Eagles)
- Rookie of the Year: Leo Carlo Liay (Ateneo Blue Eagles)

=== Women's tournament ===
==== Elimination round ====
===== Team standings =====
Pos	Team	Pld	W	D	L	GF	GA	GD	Pts	Qualification
1	FEU Lady Tamaraws	8	5	3	0	9	0	+9	18	Twice-to-beat in the finals
2	De La Salle Lady Archers	8	3	4	1	7	6	+1	13	Twice-to-win in the finals
3	UST Growling Tigresses	8	3	2	3	11	9	+2	11	
4	Ateneo Lady Eagles	8	3	2	3	7	7	0	11	
5	UP Lady Maroons	8	0	1	7	1	15	−14	1	

Source: ABS-CBN Sports

===== Match-up results =====
	Round 1				Round 2			
Team ╲ Game	1	2	3	4	5	6	7	8
AdMU	UP school colors	FEU school colors	La Salle school colors	UST school colors	UP school colors	UST school colors	FEU school colors	La Salle school colors
DLSU	FEU school colors	UP school colors	UST school colors	Ateneo school colors	UST school colors	FEU school colors	Ateneo school colors	UP school colors
FEU	La Salle school colors	UST school colors	Ateneo school colors	UP school colors	La Salle school colors	Ateneo school colors	UP school colors	UST school colors
UP	Ateneo school colors	La Salle school colors	UST school colors	FEU school colors	Ateneo school colors	UST school colors	FEU school colors	La Salle school colors
UST	FEU school colors	La Salle school colors	UP school colors	Ateneo school colors	La Salle school colors	Ateneo school colors	UP school colors	FEU school colors

= Win; = Draw; = Loss

==== Awards ====
- Most Valuable Player: Barbie Ann Sobredo (FEU Lady Tamaraws)
- Rookie of the Year: Toni Zoemima Nolasco (De La Salle Lady Archers)

=== Boys' tournament ===
==== Elimination round ====
===== Team standings =====
Pos	Team	Pld	W	D	L	GF	GA	GD	Pts	Qualification
1	FEU–D Baby Tamaraws	5	4	1	0	10	3	+7	13	Twice-to-beat in the finals
2	Ateneo Blue Eaglets	5	3	2	0	10	3	+7	11	Twice-to-win in the finals
3	Zobel Junior Archers	5	1	1	3	5	2	+3	4	
4	UST Tiger Cubs	5	0	0	5	2	10	−8	0	

Source: ABS-CBN Sports

===== Match-up results =====
	Round 1			Round 2		
Team ╲ Game	1	2	3	4	5	6
AdMU	UST school colors	La Salle school colors	FEU school colors	La Salle school colors	FEU school colors	UST school colors
DLSZ	FEU school colors	Ateneo school colors	UST school colors	Ateneo school colors	UST school colors	FEU school colors
FEU	La Salle school colors	UST school colors	Ateneo school colors	UST school colors	Ateneo school colors	La Salle school colors
UST	Ateneo school colors	FEU school colors	La Salle school colors	FEU school colors	La Salle school colors	Ateneo school colors

= Win; = Draw; = Loss

==== Awards ====
- Most Valuable Player: Audie Menzi (FEU–D Baby Tamaraws)
- Rookie of the Year: Javier Augustine Gayoso (Ateneo Blue Eaglets)

== Baseball ==
The UAAP Season 75 baseball tournament began on January 6, 2013 at the baseball diamond of the Rizal Memorial Baseball Stadium.

=== Men's tournament ===
==== Elimination round ====
===== Team standings =====
Rank	Team	GP	W	L
1	Ateneo Blue Eagles	10	8	2
2	NU Bulldogs	10	7	3
3	UST Growling Tigers	10	7	3
4	UP Fighting Maroons	10	5	5
5	De La Salle Green Archers	10	3	7
6	Adamson Soaring Falcons	10	0	10

Qualified to the Finals with the twice-to-beat advantage
Qualified to the Finals

===== Match-ups results =====
	Round 1					Round 2				
Team ╲ Game	1	2	3	4	5	6	7	8	9	10
AdU	Ateneo school colors	NU school colors	La Salle school colors	UP school colors	UST school colors	Ateneo school colors	UST school colors	La Salle school colors	UP school colors	NU school colors
AdMU	Adamson school colors	La Salle school colors	UP school colors	UST school colors	NU school colors	Adamson school colors	La Salle school colors	UP school colors	NU school colors	UST school colors
DLSU	UST school colors	Ateneo school colors	Adamson school colors	NU school colors	UP school colors	NU school colors	Ateneo school colors	Adamson school colors	UST school colors	UP school colors
NU	UP school colors	Adamson school colors	UST school colors	La Salle school colors	Ateneo school colors	La Salle school colors	UP school colors	UST school colors	Ateneo school colors	Adamson school colors
UP	NU school colors	UST school colors	Ateneo school colors	Adamson school colors	La Salle school colors	UST school colors	NU school colors	Ateneo school colors	Adamson school colors	La Salle school colors
UST	La Salle school colors	UP school colors	NU school colors	Ateneo school colors	Adamson school colors	UP school colors	Adamson school colors	NU school colors	La Salle school colors	Ateneo school colors

= Win; = Loss

==== Awards ====
- Most Valuable Players: Jose Miguel Salud and Fernando Mateo Vicente Laurel (Ateneo Blue Eagles)
- Rookie of the Year: Jose Miguel Salud (Ateneo Blue Eagles)

=== Juniors' tournament ===
==== Elimination round ====
===== Team standings =====
Rank	Team	GP	W	L
1	Ateneo Blue Eaglets	4	4	0
2	Zobel Junior Archers	4	2	2
3	UST Tiger Cubs	4	0	4

Qualified to the Finals with the twice-to-beat advantage
Qualified to the Finals

===== Match-up results =====
	Round 1		Round 2	
Team ╲ Game	1	2	3	4
AdMU	La Salle school colors	UST school colors	UST school colors	La Salle school colors
DLSZ	Ateneo school colors	UST school colors	UST school colors	Ateneo school colors
UST	Ateneo school colors	La Salle school colors	Ateneo school colors	La Salle school colors

= Win; = Loss

==== Awards ====
- Most Valuable Player: Juan Paulo Macasaet (Ateneo Blue Eaglets)
- Rookie of the Year:

== Softball ==
The UAAP Season 75 softball tournament began on December 5, 2012 at the baseball diamond of the Rizal Memorial Sports Complex in Malate, Manila.

=== Women's tournament ===
==== Elimination round ====
===== Team standings =====
Rank	Team	GP	W	L
1	Adamson Lady Falcons	9	9	0
2	NU Lady Bulldogs	9	6	3
3	UST Growling Tigresses	9	5	4
4	UP Lady Maroons	9	5	4
5	UE Lady Warriors	10	4	6
6	De La Salle Lady Archers	10	2	8
7	Ateneo Lady Eagles	10	2	8

Qualified to the semifinals with the twice-to-beat advantage
Qualified to the semifinals

===== Match-up results =====
	Round 1						Round 2					
Team ╲ Game	1	2	3	4	5	6	7	8	9	10	11	12
AdU	La Salle school colors	UE school colors	Ateneo school colors	NU school colors	UE school colors	UST school colors	Ateneo school colors	UST school colors	La Salle school colors			
AdMU	UST school colors	La Salle school colors	Adamson school colors	UE school colors	NU school colors	UP school colors	Adamson school colors	UP school colors	UE school colors		La Salle school colors	
DLSU	Adamson school colors	Ateneo school colors	UE school colors	UP school colors	UST school colors	NU school colors	UST school colors	UE school colors	Adamson school colors	UP school colors	Ateneo school colors	NU school colors
NU	UP school colors	UST school colors	Adamson school colors	UE school colors	Ateneo school colors	La Salle school colors	UE school colors		UP school colors			La Salle school colors
UE	Adamson school colors	La Salle school colors	Ateneo school colors	NU school colors	UP school colors	UST school colors	NU school colors	La Salle school colors	Ateneo school colors			La Salle school colors
UP	NU school colors	UST school colors	La Salle school colors	Adamson school colors	UE school colors	Ateneo school colors	UE school colors	Ateneo school colors	NU school colors	La Salle school colors		
UST	Ateneo school colors	NU school colors	UP school colors	La Salle school colors	Adamson school colors	UE school colors	La Salle school colors	Adamson school colors				

= Win; = Loss

==== Playoffs ====
Stepladder round 1 One-game playoff
3	UP
4	UST

Stepladder round 2 No. 2 has twice-to-beat advantage
2	NU
3	UST

Finals; No. 1 seed has to win twice; opponent thrice
1	Adamson
2	NU

==== Awards ====
- Most Valuable Player: Michelle Lentija (Adamson Lady Falcons)
- Rookie of the Year: Mary Louise Garde (UST Growling Tigresses)

== Badminton ==
The UAAP Season 75 badminton tournament began on August 11, 2012 at Badminton Hall, Rizal Memorial Sports Complex.

=== Men's tournament ===
==== Elimination round ====
===== Team standings =====
Pos	Team	Pld	W	L	PCT	GB	Qualification
1	NU Bulldogs	7	7	0	1.000	—	Advance to the Finals with thrice-to-beat advantage
2	Ateneo Blue Eagles	7	6	1	.857	1	Twice-to-beat in stepladder round 2
3	De La Salle Green Archers	7	5	2	.714	2	Qualified to stepladder round 1
4	UST Growling Tigers	7	4	3	.571	3	Qualified to stepladder round 1
5	FEU Tamaraws	7	3	4	.429	4	
6	UP Fighting Maroons	7	2	5	.286	5	
7	Adamson Soaring Falcons	7	1	6	.143	6	
8	UE Red Warriors	7	0	7	.000	7	

Rules for classification: 1) winning percentage; 2) if tied for #2 or #4, one-game playoff; 3) head-to-head record; 4) head-to-head point differential; 5) overall point differential

==== Playoffs ====
Stepladder round 1 (One-game playoff)
3	La Salle	3
4	UST	0

Stepladder round 2 (No. 2 has twice-to-beat advantage)
2	Ateneo	3
3	La Salle	1

Finals; No. 1 seed has to win twice; opponent thrice
1	NU	0	3	3
2	Ateneo	3	2	2

==== Awards ====
- Most Valuable Player: Joper Escueta (NU Bulldogs)
- Rookie of the Year: Carlos Cayanan (De La Salle Green Archers)

=== Women's tournament ===
==== Elimination round ====
===== Team standings =====
Rank	Team	W	L	PCT
1	Ateneo Lady Eagles	7	0	1.000
2	FEU Lady Tamaraws	6	1	.857
3	De La Salle Lady Archers	5	2	.714
4	UE Lady Warriors	3	4	.429
5	UST Growling Tigresses	3	4	.429
6	UP Lady Maroons	2	5	.286
7	Adamson Lady Falcons	1	6	.143
8	NU Lady Bulldogs	1	6	.143

- Qualified to the Finals with the thrice-to-beat advantage
- Qualified to the semifinals with the twice-to-beat advantage
- Qualified to the semifinals
- Qualified to the knockout game

==== Awards ====
- Most Valuable Player: Gelita Castillo (Ateneo Lady Eagles)
- Rookie of the Year: Janelle Gloriane de Vera (Ateneo Lady Eagles)

== Swimming ==
The UAAP Season 75 swimming tournament was held on September 27–30, 2012 at the Trace Aquatics Centre in Los Baños, Laguna. Four titles were disputed: the men's division, women's division, boys' division, and girls' division.

Team ranking is determined by a point system, similar to that of the overall championship. The points given are based on the swimmer's/team's finish in the finals of an event, which include only the top eight finishers from the preliminaries. The gold medalist(s) receive 15 points, silver gets 12, bronze has 10. The following points: 8, 6, 4, 2 and 1 are given to the rest of the participating swimmers/teams according to their order of finish.

=== Seniors division ===
==== Men's tournament ====
===== Final team standings =====
Rank	Team	Medals				Points
Rank	Team	1st place, gold medalist(s)	2nd place, silver medalist(s)	3rd place, bronze medalist(s)	Total	Points
1st place, gold medalist(s)	Ateneo	11	6	6	23	365
2nd place, silver medalist(s)	La Salle	8	5	3	16	347
3rd place, bronze medalist(s)	UP	2	7	8	17	286
4	UST	1	4	6	11	219
5	UE	0	0	0	0	0

===== Awards =====
- Most Valuable Player: Johansen Aguilar (De La Salle Green Archers)
- Rookie of the Year: Axel Ngui (Ateneo Blue Eagles)

==== Women's tournament ====
===== Final team standings =====
Rank	Team	Medals				Points
Rank	Team	1st place, gold medalist(s)	2nd place, silver medalist(s)	3rd place, bronze medalist(s)	Total	Points
1st place, gold medalist(s)	UP	16	7	8	31	568
2nd place, silver medalist(s)	Ateneo	5	9	6	20	326
3rd place, bronze medalist(s)	La Salle	0	5	4	9	196
4	UST	0	1	2	3	65
5	UE	0	0	0	0	13

===== Awards =====
- Most Valuable Player: Delia Angela Cordero (UP Lady Maroons)
- Rookie of the Year: Delia Angela Cordero (UP Lady Maroons)

Pos.	Pts.
1st	15
2nd	12
3rd	10
4th	8
5th	6
6th	4
7th	2
8th	1

=== Juniors division ===
==== Boys' tournament ====
===== Final team standings =====
Rank	Team	Medals				Points
Rank	Team	1st place, gold medalist(s)	2nd place, silver medalist(s)	3rd place, bronze medalist(s)	Total	Points
1st place, gold medalist(s)	Ateneo	0	0	0	0	477.5
2nd place, silver medalist(s)	La Salle	0	0	0	0	294.0
3rd place, bronze medalist(s)	UE	0	0	0	0	217.5
4	UST	0	0	0	0	132.0
5	UP	0	0	0	0	52.0

===== Awards =====
- Most Valuable Player: Gerard Christoffe Reyes (Ateneo Blue Eaglets)
- Rookie of the Year: Maurice Sacho Ilustre (UE Junior Red Warriors)

==== Girls' tournament ====
===== Final team standings =====
Rank	Team	Medals				Points
Rank	Team	1st place, gold medalist(s)	2nd place, silver medalist(s)	3rd place, bronze medalist(s)	Total	Points
1st place, gold medalist(s)	UE	0	0	0	0	429
2nd place, silver medalist(s)	UST	0	0	0	0	305
3rd place, bronze medalist(s)	UPIS	0	0	0	0	236
4	DLSZ	0	0	0	0	120

===== Awards =====
- Most Valuable Player: Pricila Aquino (UPIS Junior Lady Maroons)
- Rookie of the Year: Carmen Rose Matabuena (UE Junior Lady Warriors)

== Exhibition events ==
=== Cheerdance ===
The UAAP Cheerdance Competition was held on September 22, 2012 at the SM Mall of Asia Arena. The event was shown live on TV by Studio 23. Cheer dance competition is an exhibition event. Points for the general championship are not awarded to the participants.

Rank	Order	Pep squad	Average
1st place, gold medalist(s)	8th	UP Pep Squad	92.26
2nd place, silver medalist(s)	4th	FEU Cheering Squad	91.36
3rd place, bronze medalist(s)	3rd	**NU Pep Squad**	85.16
4th	6th	UST Salinggawi Dance Troupe	85.56
5th	7th	Ateneo Blue Babble Battalion	80.84
6th	5th	UE Pep Squad	79.30
7th	2nd	DLSU Animo Squad	81.76
8th	1st	Adamson Pep Squad	77.50

Score Sheet

Ranking Frequency is used in declaring the winners.

Rank	Order	Team	Jana Eftimiu		Julien LeBlond		Huang Yu Chun		Manuel Malonzo		Joe Jackson		Average
Rank	Order	Team	Score	Rank	Score	Rank	Score	Rank	Score	Rank	Score	Rank	Average
**1**	**8th**	**UP Pep Squad**	**94.00**	**1st**	**92.50**	**1st**	**95.80**	**2nd**	**91.00**	**1st**	**88.00**	**1st**	92.26%
**2**	**4th**	**FEU Cheering Squad**	**93.50**	**2nd**	**91.50**	**2nd**	**96.80**	**1st**	**91.00**	**1st**	**84.00**	**2nd**	91.36%
**3**	**3rd**	**NU Pep Squad**	**83.00**	**3rd**	86.50	5th	**93.30**	**3rd**	80.00	7th	**83.00**	**3rd**	85.16%
4	6th	UST Salinggawi Dance Troupe	79.50	4th	88.50	4th	87.80	5th	**90.50**	**3rd**	81.50	4th	85.56%
5	7th	Ateneo Blue Babble Battalion	74.50	7th	**89.90**	**3rd**	81.80	6th	86.50	6th	71.50	7th	80.84%
6	5th	UE Pep Squad	74.50	7th	80.50	7th	80.50	7th	**90.50**	**3rd**	70.50	8th	79.30%
7	2nd	DLSU Animo Squad	79.00	5th	76.00	8th	89.30	4th	88.00	5th	76.50	5th	81.76%
8	1st	Adamson Pep Squad	75.00	6th	87.50	6th	76.00	8th	76.00	8th	73.00	6th	77.50%

Host team in boldface. "Order" refers to order of performance.

- Stunner awardee: Nicolette Erica Ambulo (UP)

=== Street dance ===
The 3rd UAAP Street Dance Competition was held during the awarding and closing ceremonies for this season's UAAP. Street dance competition is an exhibition event. Points for the general championship are not awarded to the participants.

Rank	Team	Score
1st place, gold medalist(s)	UP Street Dance Club	91.17
2nd place, silver medalist(s)	La Salle Dance Company–Street	86.75
3rd place, bronze medalist(s)	Company of Adamson Street Dance	84.25
4	FEU Dance Company	TBA
5	Company of Ateneo Dancers	TBA
6	**NU Underdawg**	TBA
7	UST Salinggawi Dance Troupe	TBA
8	UE Street Warriors	TBA

Host team in boldface.

== General championship summary ==
The general champion is determined by a point system. The system gives 15 points to the champion team of a UAAP event, 12 to the runner-up, and 10 to the third placer. The following points: 8, 6, 4, 2 and 1 are given to the rest of the participating teams according to their order of finish.

=== Medals table ===
==== Seniors' division ====
Rank	Team	Gold	Silver	Bronze	Total
1	University of Santo Tomas	6	6	4	16
2	De La Salle University	5	5	11	21
3	Ateneo de Manila University	5	4	0	9
4	Far Eastern University	4	4	5	13
5	National University*	4	2	1	7
6	University of the East	2	1	1	4
7	University of the Philippines Diliman	1	5	3	9
8	Adamson University	1	1	3	5
Totals (8 entries)		28	28	28	84

* Host nation (Season host); General champions
Notes: Results are final.

==== Juniors' division ====
Rank	Team	Gold	Silver	Bronze	Total
1	University of the East	4	3	1	8
2	Far Eastern University–Diliman	3	0	1	4
3	Ateneo de Manila University	2	3	1	6
4	University of Santo Tomas	2	2	6	10
5	National University*	1	3	1	5
6	De La Salle Zobel	1	2	3	6
7	UP Integrated School	1	0	1	2
8	Adamson University	0	1	0	1
Totals (8 entries)		14	14	14	42

* Host nation (Season host); General champions
Notes: Results are final.

=== General championship tally ===
==== Seniors' division ====
		Basketball		Volleyball (indoor)		Volleyball (beach)		Swimming		Chess		Tennis		Table tennis		Badminton		Taekwondo		Judo		Baseball	Softball	Football		Athletics		Fencing		Total		
Rank	Team	M	W	M	W	M	W	M	W	M	W	M	W	M	W	M	W	M	W	M	W	M	W	M	W	M	W	M	W	M	W	Overall
1	La Salle	8	12	10	15	8	10	12	10	10	15	10	15	12	15	10	10	12	15	10	8	6	2	8	12	10	8	10	10	136	157	293
2	UST	12	4	6	6	1	15	8	8	15	4	12	12	15	8	8	8	15	12	15	15	10	10	6	10	12	10	8	12	143	134	277
3	Ateneo	15	8	4	12	2	2	15	12	2	2	4	6	2	4	12	15	4	2	8	6	15	4	15	8	4	4	12	6	114	91	205
4	FEU	6	15	12	4	12	6	—	—	12	10	—	—	10	10	6	12	6	10	—	—	—	—	10	15	15	15	6	8	95	105	200
5	UP	1	2	2	2	4	8	10	15	1	12	8	10	6	12	4	4	10	8	12	12	8	8	12	6	6	6	4	4	88	109	197
6	NU (H)	10	6	15	8	15	6	—	—	6	8	15	8	4	6	15	1	2	6	—	—	12	12	4	—	—	—	2	—	100	61	161
7	UE	2	1	1	1	6	1	6	6	8	1	6	—	8	—	1	6	6	4	6	10	—	6	2	—	8	12	15	15	75	63	138
8	Adamson	4	10	8	10	10	12	—	—	4	6	—	—	1	2	2	2	—	—	4	4	4	15	—	—	2	2	—	—	39	63	102

(H) Season host; = Champion; = Runner-up; = Third place; — = No team.
Notes: Results are final.

==== Juniors' division ====
		Basketball	Volleyball (indoor)		Swimming		Chess	Table tennis	Taekwondo	Judo	Baseball	Football	Athletics	Fencing		Total				
Rank	Team	B	B	G	B	G	C	B	B	B	B	B	B	B	G	B	G	C	K	Overall
1	UST	10	10	10	8	12	4	10	15	15	10	8	8	10	12	104	34	4	0	142
2	UE	1	15	8	10	15	8	12	12	8	—	—	12	15	15	85	38	8	0	131
3	Ateneo	8	8	—	15	—	6	6	8	12	15	12	10	12	—	106	0	6	0	112
4	DLSZ	6	4	15	12	8	2	4	—	10	12	10	4	8	10	70	33	2	0	105
5	NU (H)	12	12	12	—	—	10	15	—	—	—	—	—	—	—	39	12	10	0	61
6	FEU–D	15	—	—	—	—	15	—	10	—	—	15	—	—	—	40	0	15	0	55
7	UPIS	4	6	6	6	10	—	2	—	—	—	—	15	—	—	33	16	0	0	49
8	Adamson	2	—	—	—	—	12	8	—	—	—	—	6	—	—	16	0	12	0	28

(H) Season host; = Champion; = Runner-up; = Third place; — = No team.
Notes: Results are final.

== Individual awards ==
- Athlete of the Year:
  - Seniors (Men): Christian Al dela Cruz (UST Growling Tigers)
  - Seniors (Women): Michelle Lentija (Adamson Lady Falcons)
  - Juniors: Juan Miguel Ramos (UST Tiger Cubs)

== See also ==
- NCAA Season 88
