= 2011 UST Growling Tigers basketball team =

2011 UST Growling Tigers men's basketball

Record
- Elims rank: #4
- Final rank: #4
- 2011 record: 8–7 (8–6 elims)
- Head coach: Pido Jarencio (6th season)
- Assistant coaches: Estong Ballesteros; Senen Dueñas
- Captain: Jeric Fortuna (4th season)

The 2011 UST Growling Tigers men's basketball team represented University of Santo Tomas in the 74th season of the University Athletic Association of the Philippines. The men's basketball tournament for the school year 2011-12 began on July 10, 2011 and the host school for the season was Ateneo de Manila University.

The Tigers, who had celebrated their quadricentennial year, finished fourth at the end of the double round-robin eliminations. They won eight games against six losses. They lost to the No. 1-ranked Ateneo Blue Eagles, who had a twice-to-beat advantage in the semifinals.

They had an average winning margin of 8.9 points and an average losing margin of 13.0 points.

They experienced blowout losses twice in the tournament, both during the second round. The first was against Ateneo by 25 points on August 20, and the other was against the NU Bulldogs by 24 points in the last playing date of the eliminations on September 11.

Team captain Jeric Fortuna was chosen Player of the Week by the UAAP Press Corps for the duration of July 14–17. Cameroonian rookie center Karim Abdul was also chosen Player of the Week for August 11–14, and third year guard Jeric Teng got the citation during the week of September 1–4, 2011.

Abdul who was third in the MVP tally with 60.3 statistical points was disqualified from the Mythical team due to a suspension from a game for two unsportsmanlike fouls that he committed in the eliminations. He had a double-double average of 12.1 points and a league-best 11.5 rebounds on top of the 1.5 blocks per game that he amassed in the season.

== Roster ==
UST Growling Tigers roster
Players
Coaches

Pos.	No.	Nat.	Name	Height	Year	High School
SF	4	(Philippines)	Ron Kristoffer Javier	6'1" (1.85m)	1st	University of Santo Tomas
SG	5	(Philippines)	Kim Kaizen Lo	6'1" (1.85m)	2nd	St. Jude Catholic School
PG	6	(Canada)	Sheak Jamil Sheriff, Jr.	5'9" (1.75m)	1st	Loyola Catholic Secondary School
PG	7	(Philippines)	Jeric Marco Fortuna (C)	5'7" (1.7m)	4th	De La Salle Santiago Zobel School
PF	8	(Philippines)	Carmelo Afuang	6'4" (1.93m)	4th	San Beda College–Rizal
SG	9	(Philippines)	Jaypee Sarcia	–	1st	University of Santo Tomas
SG	10	(Philippines)	Aljohn Gil Ungria	6'1" (1.85m)	2nd	Colegio de San Lorenzo
PG	11	(Philippines)	Robin Allan Tan	5'7" (1.7m)	1st	Xavier School
PF	12	(United States)	Christopher Camus	6'4" (1.93m)	5th	Sunny Hills High School
C	13	(Philippines)	Paulo Lorenzo Pe	6'4" (1.93m)	2nd	Ateneo de Manila
SF	14	(Philippines)	Kevin Ferrer	6'4" (1.93m)	1st	University of Santo Tomas
SG	16	(Philippines)	Jeric Allen Teng	6'2" (1.88m)	3rd	Xavier School
SG	17	(Philippines)	Eduardo Aytona, Jr.	5'10" (1.78m)	3rd	University of Santo Tomas
SF	18	(Philippines)	Louie Philippe Vigil	6'3" (1.91m)	1st	José Rizal University
SF	19	(Philippines)	Kent Jefferson Lao	6'4" (1.93m)	1st	Saint Stephen's High School
C	20	(Cameroon)	Karim Abdul	6'6" (1.98m)	1st	Sta. Clara International Academy

Head coach

- (Philippines) Alfredo Jarencio

Assistant coach(es)

- Senen Dueñas
- Ernesto Ballesteros
- Alvin Grey
- Christopher Cantonjos
- Ma. Genevieve Francisco
- Rodil Sablan

Strength & conditioning coach(es)

- Emmanuel Calipes
- Yi Ming Liu

Team manager

- Clarence Aytona

Legend

- (C) Team captain
- Injured

- Roster

=== Depth chart ===
Pos.	Starting 5	Bench 1	Bench 2
C	Pe	Abdul
PF	Camus	Afuang
SF	Ferrer	Lao	Vigil
SG	Teng	Lo	Ungria
PG	Fortuna	Sheriff	Tan

== Roster changes ==
The Tigers shored up on their front line with the arrival of Karim Abdul who immediately made an impact when he led the league in rebounds at the end of eliminations. In Season 73, the team ranked last in rebounds with an average of only 35.4 per game. They also lagged behind in defensive boards with 22.1 and blocks with 2.5 per game averages.

UST was also able to recruit blue chips from the high school ranks, with UST Tiger Cub Kevin Ferrer who was hailed the UAAP Season 73 Juniors MVP and José Rizal University's Louie Vigil, the Juniors MVP of the NCAA in Season 85 coming onboard.

=== Subtractions ===
Pos.	No.	Nat.	Player	Height	Year	High school	Notes
PG	6	(Philippines)	Edcor Marata	5' 10"	2nd	University of the Visayas	Relegated to Team B
SG	9	(Philippines)	Clark Daniel Oliver Bautista	5' 9"	4th	Benedictine International School	Academic deficiencies
SF	10	(Philippines)	Aljon Mariano	6' 3"	3rd	San Beda College–Rizal	Out due to fractured right ankle
PF	11	(Philippines)	Andre Charles Marquez	6' 3"	4th	La Salle Greenhills	Graduated
C	14	(Philippines)	Vincent Roberto Tinte	6' 7"	2nd	Urdaneta City National High School	Transferred to Adamson University
SG	17	(Philippines)	Fritz Harmon Delgado	6' 0"	2nd	San Sebastian College-Recoletos	Academic deficiencies
SF	18	(Philippines)	Eduardo Daquioag, Jr.	6' 1"	2nd	RTU Laboratory High School	Out due to rheumatic fever
C	20	(Philippines)	Kenneth Mamaril	6' 5"	2nd	San Sebastian College-Recoletos	Relegated to Team B
PG	21	(Philippines)	Jackson Wong	5' 10"	3rd	Philippine Academy of Sakya-Manila	Transferred to Trinity University of Asia

=== Additions ===
Pos.	No.	Nat.	Player	Height	Year	High school	Notes
SF	4	(Philippines)	Ron Kristoffer Javier	6' 1"	1st	University of Santo Tomas	Rookie
PG	6	(Canada)	Sheak Jamil Sheriff, Jr.	5' 9"	1st	Loyola Catholic Secondary School	Rookie
SG	9	(Philippines)	Jaypee Sarcia		1st	University of Santo Tomas	Rookie
SG	10	(Philippines)	Aljohn Gil Ungria	6' 1"	2nd	Colegio de San Lorenzo	Returning from Season 72
PG	11	(Philippines)	Robin Allan Tan	5' 7"	1st	Xavier School	Rookie
SF	14	(Philippines)	Kevin Ferrer	6' 4"	1st	University of Santo Tomas	Rookie
SF	18	(Philippines)	Louie Philippe Vigil	6' 3"	1st	José Rizal University	Rookie
SF	19	(Philippines)	Kent Jefferson Lao	6' 4"	1st	Saint Stephen's High School	Rookie
C	20	(Cameroon)	Karim Abdul	6' 6"	1st	Sta. Clara International Academy	Rookie

== Schedule and results ==
=== Preseason tournaments ===
The Filoil Flying V Preseason Premier Cup games were aired on Studio 23.

Preseason game log

2011 Millennium Basketball League–Open Basketball championship: 4–1
Game	Date • Time	Opponent	Result	Record	High points	High rebounds	High assists	Location
1	Mar 8 • 7:30 pm	Lyceum Pirates	W 92–79	1–0	Teng (21)			Lyceum Gym; Manila
2	Mar 15	Wang's Ballclub	W 81–63	2–0				
3	May 12 • 6:45 pm	Hobe Bihon	L 70–72	2–1				Aquinas Gym; San Juan
4	May 14	Hobe Bihon; Semifinal	W 75–65	3–1				
5	May 19	Foscon Ship Management; Championship	W 65–56	4–1	Fortuna (16)			Lyceum Gym; Manila

2011 Filoil Flying V Preseason Premier Cup: 3–4
Game	Date • Time	Opponent	Result	Record	High points	High rebounds	High assists	Location
1	Apr 9 • 5:00 pm	De La Salle Green Archers	W 79–70	1–0	Fortuna (20)			Filoil Flying V Arena; San Juan
2	Apr 13 • 4:00 pm	NU Bulldogs	L 52–60	1–1	Abdul (13)			Filoil Flying V Arena; San Juan
3	Apr 16 • 12:30 pm	San Sebastian Stags	W 104–102^{2OT}	2–1	Abdul (23)			Filoil Flying V Arena; San Juan
4	Apr 30 • 4:00 pm	Ateneo Blue Eagles	L 46–59	2–2	Bautista (14)			Filoil Flying V Arena; San Juan
5	May 21 • 12:30 pm	Lyceum Pirates	W 65–55	3–2	Ferrer (17)			Filoil Flying V Arena; San Juan
6	May 27 • 3:15 pm	Arellano Chiefs	L 63–64	3–3	Abdul (18)			Filoil Flying V Arena; San Juan
7	Jun 4 • 12:30 pm	San Beda Red Lions	L 72–85	3–4	Fortuna (22)			Filoil Flying V Arena; San Juan

(#) Tournament seedings in parentheses.
All times are in UTC+08:00.

=== UAAP games ===
Elimination games were played in a double round-robin format and all of UST's games were aired on Studio 23 and Balls.

UAAP Season 74 game log

Elimination round: 8–6
Game	Date • Time	Opponent	Result	Record	High points	High rebounds	High assists	Location
1	Jul 14 • 1:00 pm	NU Bulldogs	W 73–72^{OT}	1–0	Fortuna (23)	Ferrer (11)	Teng (5)	Araneta Coliseum; Quezon City
2	Jul 17 • 3:00 pm	UE Red Warriors	W 70–63	2–0	Ferrer (19)	Abdul (9)	Fortuna (8)	Araneta Coliseum; Quezon City
3	Jul 24 • 3:00 pm	Adamson Soaring Falcons	L 71–81	2–1	Teng (15)	Abdul (10)	Tied (4)	PhilSports Arena; Pasig
4	Jul 30 • 3:00 pm	FEU Tamaraws	L 59–62	2–2	Teng (23)	Abdul (11)	Camus (3)	Araneta Coliseum; Quezon City
5	Aug 4 • 3:00 pm	Ateneo Blue Eagles	L 53–66	2–3	Fortuna (18)	Camus (11)	Fortuna (3)	Araneta Coliseum; Quezon City
6 (Note: Teng did not finish the game due to an ankle sprain)	Aug 7 • 1:00 pm	UP Fighting Maroons	W 68–49	3–3	Fortuna (16)	Abdul (14)	Tied (2)	Araneta Coliseum; Quezon City
7	Aug 11 • 3:00 pm	De La Salle Green Archers; End of R1 of eliminations	L 71–74	3–4	Abdul (21)	Abdul (11)	Fortuna (4)	Araneta Coliseum; Quezon City
8	Aug 14 • 1:00 pm	UP Fighting Maroons	W 77–70	4–4	Abdul (21)	Tied (11)	Fortuna (6)	Araneta Coliseum; Quezon City
9 (Note: UST committed a season record of 23 turnovers in the game)	Aug 20 • 3:00 pm	Ateneo Blue Eagles	L 57–82	4–5	Teng (20)	Abdul (19)	Teng (4)	Araneta Coliseum; Quezon City
10 (Note: The Growling Tigers had a team-high 63 rebounds in the game)	Aug 25 • 3:00 pm	De La Salle Green Archers	W 60–52	5–5	Teng (14)	Abdul (12)	Tied (3)	Araneta Coliseum; Quezon City
11	Aug 28 • 1:00 pm	UE Red Warriors	W 54–45	6–5	Abdul (16)	Abdul (13)	Fortuna (3)	Araneta Coliseum; Quezon City
12	Sep 3 • 3:00 pm	Adamson Soaring Falcons	W 74–58	7–5	Teng (20)	Abdul (14)	Teng (6)	Araneta Coliseum; Quezon City
13	Sep 8 • 3:00 pm	FEU Tamaraws	W 77–73	8–5	Abdul (20)	Abdul (13)	Tied (3)	Araneta Coliseum; Quezon City
14	Sep 11 • 1:00 pm	NU Bulldogs; End of R2 of eliminations	L 49–73	8–6	Teng (19)	Ungria (7)	Tied (1)	Araneta Coliseum; Quezon City

Final Four: 0–1
Game	Date • Time	Seed	Opponent	Result	Series	High points	High rebounds	High assists	Location
1	Sep 15 • 12:00 pm	(#4)	(#1) Ateneo Blue Eagles	L 66–69	0–1 (8–7)	Abdul (16)	Abdul (16)		Araneta Coliseum; Quezon City

(#) Tournament seedings in parentheses.
All times are in UTC+08:00.
Source: HumbleBola

=== Postseason tournament ===
Postseason game log

2011 Philippine Collegiate Championship: 0–1
Game	Date • Time	Opponent	Result	Record	High points	High rebounds	High assists	Location
1 (Note: Fortuna and Teng did not play as they were part of the national team that competed in the 26th Southeast Asian Games in Jakarta)	Nov 21	De La Salle Green Archers; Luzon-NCR Main draw bracket	L 67–72	0–1	Ferrer (23)	Abdul (7)	Sheriff (5)	Filoil Flying V Arena; San Juan

(#) Tournament seedings in parentheses.
All times are in UTC+08:00.

== UAAP statistics ==
Player	GP	GS	MPG	FGM	FGA	FG%	3PM	3PA	3P%	FTM	FTA	FT%	RPG	APG	SPG	BPG	TOV	PPG
Jeric Teng	14	13	29.6	59	184	32.1	17	74	23.0	61	79	77.2	4.4	2.2	0.8	0.3	2.9	14.0
Jeric Fortuna	14	14	30.1	73	206	35.4	26	79	32.9	19	23	82.6	4.0	3.1	1.3	0.0	2.3	13.6
Karim Abdul	13	3	27.2	58	129	45.0	0	0	0.0	41	76	53.9	11.5	1.4	1.0	1.5	3.0	12.1
Kevin Ferrer	14	9	27.0	30	111	27.0	10	56	17.9	36	54	66.7	5.4	1.3	0.4	0.1	2.2	7.6
Chris Camus	14	13	27.8	40	114	35.1	2	7	28.6	14	26	53.8	7.6	1.5	1.1	1.5	2.0	6.9
Melo Afuang	11 (Note: Afuang missed the last three games of the second round of eliminations due to a gall bladder surgery. He came back for the semifinal match against Ateneo)	5	20.5	30	61	49.2	0	0	0.0	13	20	65.0	4.6	0.4	0.3	0.3	0.5	5.2
Kim Lo	13	1	10.0	14	39	35.9	0	0	0.0	9	11	81.8	2.4	0.5	0.5	0.0	1.1	2.9
Eddie Aytona	1	0	2.0	1	1	100.0	0	0	0.0	0	0	0.0	0.0	0.0	0.0	0.0	0.0	2.0
Paolo Pe	14	9	15.1	12	39	31.0	0	0	0.0	1	2	50.0	3.4	0.2	0.1	0.2	0.7	1.8
Louie Vigil	13	0	5.0	7	27	25.9	2	6	33.3	1	2	50.0	0.8	0.2	0.3	0.1	0.8	1.3
Jon Sheriff	13	0	6.5	3	16	18.8	0	1	0.0	3	4	75.0	1.2	0.8	0.2	0.0	0.7	0.7
Aljohn Ungria	8	1	4.4	0	3	0.0	0	0	0.0	3	6	50.0	1.5	0.0	0.1	0.0	0.4	0.4
Robin Tan	14	0	5.9	0	9	0.0	0	5	0.0	0	0	0.0	0.9	0.5	0.2	0.0	0.8	0.0
Kent Lao	6	2	5.2	0	2	0.0	0	0	0.0	0	2	0.0	0.7	0.0	0.0	0.2	0.7	0.0
Ron Javier	1	0	3.0	0	1	0.0	0	1	0.0	0	0	0.0	0.0	0.0	0.0	0.0	0.0	0.0
Jaypee Sarcia	0	0	0.0	0	0	0.0	0	0	0.0	0	0	0.0	0.0	0.0	0.0	0.0	0.0	0.0
Total	14		40.4	327	942	34.7	57	229	24.9	196	304	64.5	48.3	11.9	6.1	3.9	18.3	65.2
Opponents	14		40.4	334	916	36.5	59	287	20.6	193	289	66.8	42.1	15.7	5.3	5.6	16.4	65.7

Legend
GP	Games played	GS	Games started	MPG	Minutes per game
FGM	Field-goal made	FGA	Field-goal attempts	FG%	Field-goal percentage
3PM	3-point field-goal made	3PA	3-point field-goal attempts	3P%	3-point field-goal percentage
FTM	Free-throw made	FTA	Free-throw attempts	FT%	Free-throw percentage
RPG	Rebounds per game	APG	Assists per game	SPG	Steals per game
BPG	Blocks per game	TOT	Turnovers per game	PPG	Points per game

Source: HumbleBola

== Awards ==
Name	Award	Date	Ref.
Team	2011 Millennium Basketball League champions	19 May 2011	
Jeric Fortuna	2011 Millennium Basketball League MVP	19 May 2011	
Jeric Fortuna	Player of the Week	14–17 Jul 2011	
Karim Abdul	Player of the Week	11–14 Aug 2011	
Jeric Teng	Player of the Week	1–4 Sep 2011	
