= Thomas Torres =

Filipino basketball player (born 1994)

Personal information
- Born: October 27, 1994 (age 32) Caloocan, Philippines
- Listed height: 5 ft 9 in (1.75 m)
- Listed weight: 160 lb (73 kg)

Career information
- High school: La Salle Green Hills (Mandaluyong)
- College: De La Salle (2012–2016)
- PBA draft: 2017: 3rd round, 32nd overall pick
- Drafted by: Star Hotshots
- Playing career: 2018–present
- Position: Point guard

Career history
- 2018: Mandaluyong El Tigre
- 2018–2019: Alab Pilipinas
- 2019–2020: Caloocan Supremos
- 2023–2025: Quezon Huskers

Career highlights
- 2× UAAP champion (2013, 2016); PCCL champion (2013); Filoil Flying V Cup champion (2014)

Thomas Christopher B. Torres (born October 27, 1994) is a Filipino professional basketball player who last played for the Quezon Huskers of the Maharlika Pilipinas Basketball League (MPBL). He has won two championships in the UAAP for the De La Salle Green Archers.

== High school career ==
When he was younger, Torres participated in the SBP's Passerelle tournaments. In 2011, he scored 35 points against the Letran Squires to lead the La Salle Green Hills Greenies back to the NCAA Finals for the first time since 1978–79. There, they lost to the San Beda Red Cubs. In 2012, he was selected to play in the first-ever NBTC All-Star Game.

== College ==
In 2012, Torres and his brother Axel (who was playing for De La Salle-Zobel during highschool) joined a DLSU Green Archers recruiting class that also included Mac Tallo and Jeron Teng. He got an increase in his playing time when starting point guard LA Revilla went down with an injury. He scored 10 points with seven rebounds in a win over the UST Growling Tigers.

In the final game of the elimination rounds, he scored 11 points, five rebounds, two assists, and a steal. The Archers got into the Final Four, where they lost to the Ateneo Blue Eagles.

During the offseason, the Archers won the PCCL tournament. In the Archers' first game of Season 76, Torres had 14 points and nine assists in a win over the UP Fighting Maroons. However, the Archers would find themselves in a three-way tie for at 5th place at the end of the first round of eliminations. He then missed their game against the Adamson Soaring Falcons due to an illness.

He made his return to the lineup against the FEU Tamaraws. In DLSU's rematch against UP, he incurred his second unsportsmanlike foul of the season, causing him to be suspended for one game. He made his return against the UE Red Warriors, in which DLSU won its fifth straight game. The streak was enough to put DLSU into the Final Four, where they defeated FEU to get into the Finals for the first time since 2008. In the Finals, they defeated UST in three games, winning the championship.

During the offseason, the Archers won the Filoil preseason tournament. With Revilla leaving the team as he turned pro, it was expected that Torres would be the starting point guard for the Archers in Season 77. However, he fractured his foot DLSU's opening game against Ateneo and was out for the rest of the season. While he was injured, sophomore Kib Montalbo stepped up in his absence.

In the offseason, Torres became part of the Mythical Five of the 2014 PCCL championship and led the Archers to the Filoil finals with averages of 13 points, five rebounds, and four assists. In a win over Adamson, he scored 13 of his 16 points in the second half. In a win over Ateneo, he had 15 points. Against UE, he scored 14 of his 15 points in the first half, as he and Teng led DLSU to the win. That season, DLSU finished 5th in the standings with a record of 6–8, and failed to play in the Final Four.

In 2016, Torres played his final year with the Archers. That season, he played under head coach Aldin Ayo, who had replaced long-time coach Juno Sauler. He had his first double-digit scoring game of Season 79 with 11 points in a win over the Tigers. He scored 11 points once again in a win over the Falcons. In a win over Ateneo, he had eight points and delivered one of the highlights of their season when he threw a mistimed alley-oop pass to Ben Mbala yet Mbala still managed to convert the pass into a dunk. The win also gave the Archers a sweep of the first round of eliminations. The Archers then went on to win the championship.

== Professional career ==
In 2017, Torres, along with his De La Salle teammates Teng, Julian Sargent, and Jason Perkins, declared for the 2017 PBA Draft. He was picked in the third round by the Star Hotshots. However, he was cut from the team before the season started.

=== Mandaluyong El Tigre ===
In 2018, Torres joined the roster of Mandaluyong El Tigre. However, his debut with Mandaluyong was delayed as he recovered from stab wounds sustained from an attack in Bonifacio Global City (BGC). He was able to practice with the team a month after the attack happened.

=== Alab Pilipinas ===
Later in 2018, Torres played with Alab Pilipinas. He had a costly turnover in the final minute of a loss to the Formosa Dreamers. That season, Alab was eliminated in the quarterfinals by Hong Kong Eastern.

=== Caloocan Supremos ===
In 2019, Torres played for the Caloocan Supremos. He had 15 points in a loss to the Bacoor Strikers. In a win over the Rizal Golden Coolers, he led the team with 17 points. He then followed it up with 12 points in a win over the Bicol Volcanoes. However, the COVID-19 pandemic cut his time with Caloocan short.

=== Quezon Huskers ===
Torres then played for the Muntinlupa Defenders in the 2021 Filbasket Inaugural Tournament back when it was not a professional league. He was part of the All-Filbasket Tournament Team. He also played for the Master Sardines Fishing Champs in the PBA 3x3 in 2022.

On March 9, 2023, it was announced that Torres would join the roster for the Quezon Huskers, who were making their debut in the MPBL. In Quezon's first game, he had 12 points, 10 rebounds, and seven assists, helping Quezon overcome a 16-point halftime deficit for its first win.

== Career stats ==
=== College ===
==== Elimination rounds ====
Year	Team	GP	MPG	FG%	3P%	FT%	RPG	APG	SPG	BPG	PPG
2012–13	La Salle	13	15.5	.333	.444	.909	3.6	1.5	.5	.1	3.8
2013–14	La Salle	12	22.0	.270	.229	.722	3.7	2.9	.7	.2	5.5
2014–15	La Salle	2	20.3	.250	.100	.500	2.5	.5	.5	.0	4.5
2015–16	La Salle	14	26.7	.289	.216	.718	5.3	1.9	.3	.1	8.9
2016–17	La Salle	14	21.3	.351	.159	.677	2.9	2.1	.9	.1	7.6
Career		54	21.4	.308	.221	.718	3.8	2.0	.6	.1	6.5

==== Playoffs ====
Year	Team	GP	MPG	FG%	3P%	FT%	RPG	APG	SPG	BPG	PPG
2013–14	La Salle	5	15.4	.308	.214	.667	3.2	.8	.4	.2	5.4
2014–15	La Salle	3	6.2	.000	.000	.500	.7	.3	.0	.0	1.0
2016–17	La Salle	3	19.2	.556	.000	.667	5.7	1.3	1.0	.0	4.7
Career		11	13.9	.342	.158	.625	3.2	.8	.5	.1	4.0

== Personal life ==
Torres' older brother Axel is a former contestant on Pinoy Big Brother: All In and was on the La Salle Green Archers' Team B. They are among seven siblings in their family.

In 2015, Torres was in a relationship with Arra San Agustin.

=== Stabbing incident ===
On June 3, 2018, Torres, along with Norbert Torres (not related) and Teng, were stabbed in a parking lot attack in Bonifacio Global City early that day. They recovered at St. Luke's Medical Center. His recovery lasted six months, longer than the others.
