= Karim Abdul =

Filipino basketball player (born 1992)

- Born: 3 July 1992 (age 34); Tiko, Cameroon
- Height: 6 ft 8 in (2.03 m)
Association football career
- Position: Goalkeeper
Senior career*
Years	Team	Apps	(Gls)
2013	Dolphins United		
- * Club domestic league appearances and goals
- Basketball career

Career information
- High school: Santa Clara International Academy (Antipolo, Rizal)
- College: UST
- Position: Center
- Number: 20

Career highlights
- 1× PCCL champion (2012); 3× UAAP Mythical Five (2012, 2013, 2014); 1× PCCL Mythical Five (2012)

Karim Abdul (born 3 July 1992) is a collegiate basketball player from Cameroon. He last played for the UST Growling Tigers in the University Athletic Association of the Philippines (UAAP). He is also a football player for Dolphins United F.C. where he plays as goalkeeper.

== College career ==
=== Rookie season ===
Abdul joined the Tigers in 2011 as a walk-in applicant. In his rookie season, Abdul averaged 12.0 points per game, 11.7 rebounds per game, 1.5 assists per game, 1.0 steal per game and 1.5 blocks per game. Stepping up in the second round of eliminations together with veterans Jeric Teng, Jeric Fortuna and Chris Camus, Abdul and the Tigers finished the season in 4th place with an 8–6 record and returned to the Final Four. In their Final Four match-up against the Ateneo Blue Eagles, Abdul finished with a double-double 16 points and 16 rebounds with 2 steals and 2 blocks, but his efforts came up short as the Tigers were knocked out by the Blue Eagles to advance to the Finals 66–69.

=== Second season ===
In his second season with the Tigers, Abdul went for a career high 24 points with 16 rebounds and 2 steals in a 72–73 loss against the FEU Tamaraws. The Tigers were able to advance to the UAAP Final Four as the No. 2 seed with a 10–4 record in the elimination round, they were able to defeat the NU Bulldogs to advance to the UAAP Finals and faced off against the Ateneo Blue Eagles but were swept in the Finals 2–0 as the Blue Eagles completed their five-peat. Abdul finished the season averaging 15.8 points per game, a league-leading 11.6 rebounds per game, 1.8 assists per game, a league-leading 1.5 steals per game (tied with Ray Ray Parks) and 1.7 blocks per game which is third in the UAAP on 45% field goal shooting and 60% free throw shooting. Abdul was named as a member of the Mythical Five for that season and finished second in the race for the season's Most Valuable Player award behind Ray Ray Parks.

In the Philippine Collegiate Champions League later that year, Abdul would play a key part in the Tigers run in the tournament as they first won the Metro Manila-Luzon tournament by defeating both the Letran Knights and the Adamson Soaring Falcons to enter into the PCCL Final Four with the Ateneo Blue Eagles, San Beda Red Lions and the Southwestern U Cobras. The Tigers would finish with a 2–1 record in the Final Four to set up a rematch with the Blue Eagles in the Finals, where the Tigers exacted their revenge against the Eagles as they were crowned the National Champions after winning the title in a tightly contested three-game series. Abdul would later be named to the Mythical Five team for the tournament alongside teammates Jeric Fortuna and Jeric Teng who was crowned Finals MVP.

=== Third season ===
In his third season with the Tigers, Abdul would continue his development and carried the team despite numerous injuries the Tigers players went through during the course of the elimination round. The Tigers would make their way back to the UAAP Finals for the 2nd straight season after surviving three knockout games which included their final elimination round game in which they knocked out the defending champion Ateneo Blue Eagles for the last Final Four slot, and stunning the top-seeded NU Bulldogs by winning two straight games to advance to the UAAP Finals where they battled the De La Salle Green Archers. In Game 1 of the series, Abdul would make a key defensive stop when he blocked LA Revilla's game winning layup as the Tigers held on to a 73–72 victory. However, the Archers responded with a Game 2 victory setting up a decisive Game 3. Abdul had a chance to win the game with a three pointer in overtime, but his shot went long as the Archers went on to win their first UAAP title since 2007. Abdul finished the season averaging 15.8 points per game, 11.2 rebounds per game, and 2.0 blocks per game on 48% shooting from the field and 71% shooting from the free throw line. Abdul would also be named to the Mythical Five for the second straight season together with UE's Roi Sumang, Season MVP Terrence Romeo of FEU, NU's Bobby Ray Parks Jr. and La Salle's Jason Perkins.

=== Fourth season ===
In his fourth season with the Tigers, with new head coach Bong dela Cruz taking the helm from Pido Jarencio. Abdul and the Tigers struggled during a season riddled with injuries as they finished the season with a 5–9 record which was only good for 6th place in the standings and missed the Final Four that season. Despite missing the Final Four, Abdul was selected to the UAAP Mythical Five for a third consecutive season alongside Season MVP Kiefer Ravena and Chris Newsome of Ateneo, La Salle's Jeron Teng and FEU's Mac Belo. Abdul finished the season averaging 14.4 points per game, 9.2 rebounds per game, 1.5 assists per game, 1.2 steals per game and 1.7 blocks per game on 44% shooting from the field and 75% shooting from the free throw line.
