= Phoenix Super LPG Fuel Masters draft history =

The Phoenix Fuel Masters first participated in the Philippine Basketball Association (PBA) draft on October 30, 2016. The Fuel Masters entered the league before the 2016 Commissioner's Cup when they bought the former franchise of Barako Bull Energy.

Matthew Wright became the team's first draft choice, the team's pick in the special draft for the Gilas cadets during the 2016 PBA draft.

== Selections ==
Basketball positions
PG	Point guard
SG	Shooting guard
SF	Small forward
PF	Power forward
C	Center

Draft	Round	Pick	Player	Pos.	Country of birth*	PBA D-League team	College
2016	Special draft		Matthew Wright	G	Canada	—N/a	St. Bonaventure
2016	2	2	Gelo Alolino	G	Philippines	Tanduay Light Rhum Masters	NU
2016	2	10	Jeoffrey Javillonar	F	Philippines	Tanduay Light Rhum Masters	NU
2016	3	16	Paolo Javelona	G	Philippines	BDO-National University	NU
2016	3	18	Alejandrino Iñigo Jr.	G	Philippines	Phoenix Accelerators	FEU
2017	1	4	Jason Perkins	F	United States	Caida Tile Masters	De La Salle
2017	1	8	Sidney Onwubere	F	Philippines	Racal Tile Masters	Emilio Aguinaldo
2017	2	21	Jayson Grimaldo	F	Philippines	Racal Tile Masters/Victoria Sports	MLQU
2017	2	23	Wilson Baltazar	G/F	Philippines	Bread Story Smashing Bakers	Lyceum
2017	3	28	Roldan Sara	F	Philippines	Racal Tile Masters/Team Batangas	San Beda
2017	4	39	John Karlo Casiño	G	Philippines	Cafe France Bakers/CEU Scorpions	Centro Escolar
2018	1	12	Jorey Napoles	F	Philippines	Marinerong Pilipino Skippers	TIP
2018	2	21	Ron Dennison	G	Philippines	Go for Gold	FEU
2018	2	22	Joe Allen Trinidad	G	United States	Wang's Basketball Couriers	FEU
2018	3	26	Ivan Villanueva	F	Philippines	AMA	Adamson
2018	4	36	Kim Cinco	G	Philippines	Zark's Burger	Lyceum
2019	3	28	Ralph Tansingco	F	Philippines	Zark's Burger	Lyceum
2019	4	39	Spencer Pretta	G	Philippines	Zark's Burger	Lyceum
2019	5	44	Jeffrey Santos	G	Philippines	Zark's Burger	Lyceum
Season 46	1	7	Larry Muyang	F/C	Philippines	Petron - Letran	Letran
Season 46	2	18	Nick Demusis	G/F	United States	—N/a	Whittier
Season 46	2	19	Aljun Melecio	G	Philippines	La Salle - Eco Oil	La Salle
Season 46	3	34	Reymar Caduyac	G	Philippines	Zark's Burger	Lyceum
Season 46	4	44	Max Henstchel	G	Philippines	—N/a	UvA
Season 46	5	52	Jerie Pingoy	G	Philippines	—N/a	Ateneo / Adamson
Season 47	2	14	Tyler Tio	G	Philippines	—N/a	Ateneo
Season 47	2	16	Chris Lalata	F	Philippines	—N/a	Olivarez
Season 47	2	19	Encho Serrano	G	Philippines	—N/a	La Salle
Season 47	2	23	Enzo Joson	G	Philippines	—N/a	NU
Season 47	3	28	Alvin Baetiong	C	Philippines	—N/a	San Sebastian
Season 47	4	39	Leonard Esguerra	C	Philippines	—N/a	José Rizal
Season 47	5	47	Niño Ibañez	G	Philippines	—N/a	Lyceum
Season 47	6	51	Nichole John Ubalde	G	Philippines	—N/a	USTSP
Season 48	1	6	Ken Tuffin	F	New Zealand	—N/a	FEU
Season 48	2	16	Raffy Verano	F	United States	—N/a	Ateneo
Season 48	2	17	Ricci Rivero	G	Philippines	—N/a	UP Diliman
Season 48	3	28	Matthew Daves	F	Canada	—N/a	Ateneo
Season 48	4	39	John Lloyd Clemente	G	Philippines	—N/a	NU
Season 48	5	50	Daniel Atienza	G	Philippines	—N/a	Centro Escolar
Season 48	6	59	Joe Gómez de Liaño	G	Philippines	—N/a	UP Diliman
Season 48	7	66	Theo Flores	G/F	Philippines	—N/a	NU
Season 49	1	4	Kai Ballungay	C/F	USA	Ateneo	
Season 49	3	28	CJ Payawal	F	USA	UE	
Season 49	4	38	Chino Mosqueda	G	Philippines	NU	
Season 49	5	45	Patrick Feliciano	G	Philippines	Diliman	

=== Notes ===
1.All players entering the draft are Filipinos until proven otherwise.
