= Jeron Teng =

Filipino basketball player (born 1994)

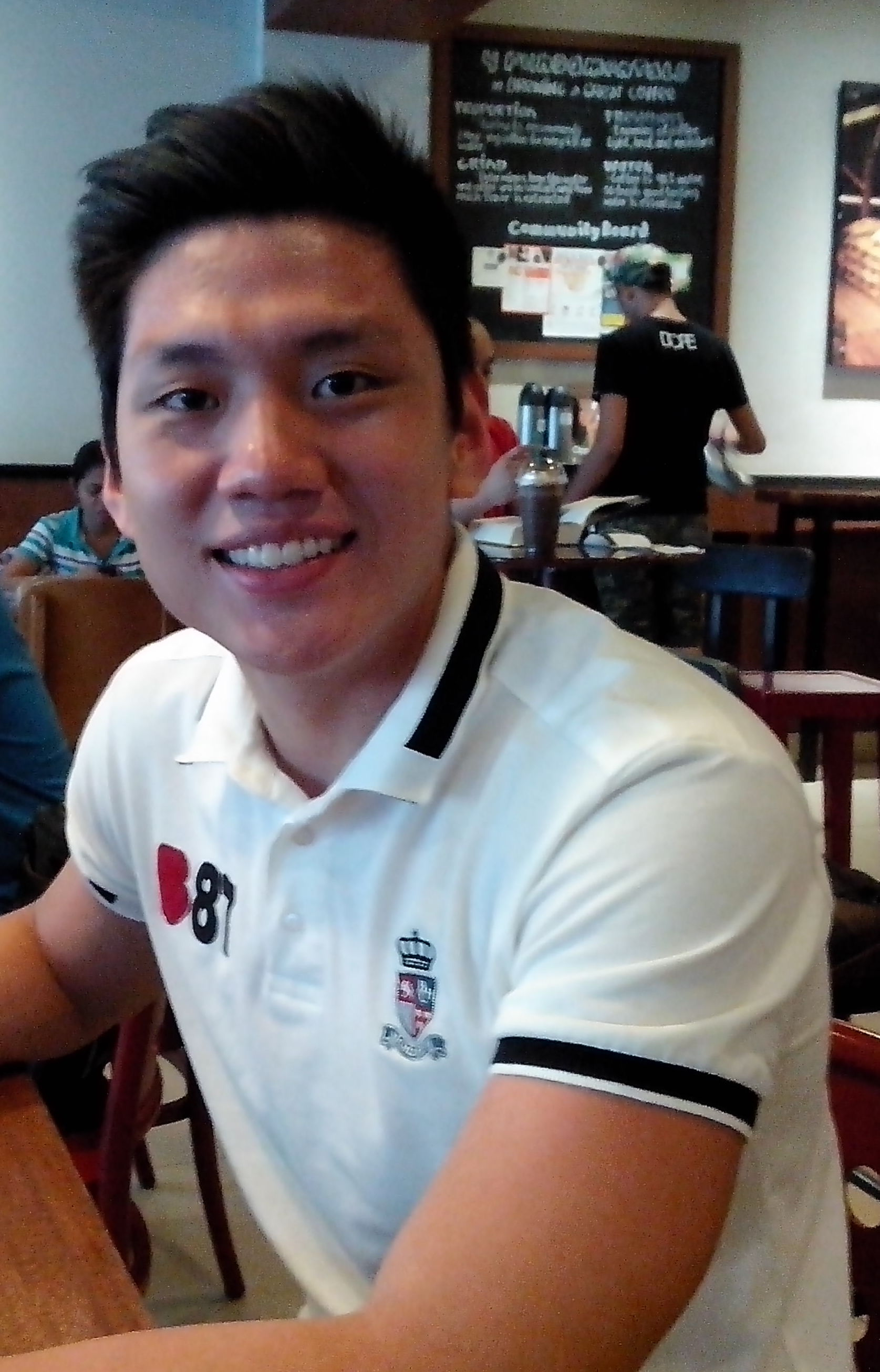
- Teng in 2014

No. 21 – San Miguel Beermen
- Position: Small forward / shooting guard
- League: PBA

Personal information
- Born: March 21, 1994 (age 32) Mandaluyong, Philippines
- Listed height: 6 ft 2 in (1.88 m)
- Listed weight: 185 lb (84 kg)

Career information
- High school: Xavier School (San Juan)
- College: De La Salle
- PBA draft: 2017: 1st round, 5th overall pick
- Drafted by: Alaska Aces
- Playing career: 2017–present

Career history
- 2017–2022: Alaska Aces
- 2022–2023: Converge FiberXers
- 2023–present: San Miguel Beermen

Career highlights
- 3× PBA champion (2023–24 Commissioner's, 2025 Philippine, 2025–26 Philippine); PBA All-Rookie Team (2018); 2× UAAP champion (2013, 2016); 2× UAAP Finals MVP (2013, 2016); 4× UAAP Mythical Five (2012, 2014–2016); UAAP Rookie of the Year (2012); PCCL champion (2013); PCCL Finals Most Valuable Player (2013); PCCL Mythical Five (2013); 2× Filoil Flying V Preseason Cup champion (2014, 2016); 2× Filoil Flying V Preseason Cup Mythical Five (2014, 2016)

Jeron Alvin Uy Teng (born March 21, 1994) is a Filipino professional basketball player for the San Miguel Beermen of the Philippine Basketball Association (PBA). As a PBA player, he usually starts at the swingman position but occasionally plays as a power forward during the Philippine Cup. He holds multiple high school records for the Xavier Golden Stallions. After his high school career, he played for the De La Salle Green Archers in the UAAP. He won some UAAP championships as the team captain.

== Early life and education ==
He was born on March 21, 1994, in Mandaluyong to Alvin and Susan Teng. Jeron is the youngest among four siblings: Alyssa, Jeric, and Almira in that order. His father, Alvin Teng, is a former player in the Philippine Basketball Association who won multiple titles as a member of the San Miguel Beermen. His older brother Jeric, was a former collegiate basketball star who played for the UST Growling Tigers. Jeric would later win a PBA championship playing the two guard for the Rain or Shine Elasto Painters. His sister Almira, on the other hand, pursued a non-athletic career in show business as a professional model and artist.

Teng was always very religious growing up and frequented the Pink Sisters Convent to pray and celebrate Mass. As a young child, Jeron gained serious interest in basketball after his older brother Jeric encouraged him to join the Xavier basketball team when he was in third grade. Teng eventually won his first of many titles that year in the Metro Manila Tiong Lian Basketball Association (MMTLBA), one of the premier elementary and high school basketball leagues in the nation. The Teng brothers were frequently tutored by the power forward Alvin, who recommended that they instead develop skills associated with the guard position. The move would later prove to be crucial for the development of the two future PBA players.

=== High school ===
Like his older brother Jeric, Jeron played high school basketball for Xavier School. He led the Golden Stallions to two MMTLBA championships and won for himself the season MVP award in his three seasons with the team. In 2011, Teng broke what was then the all-time Philippine record for points in a single game by scoring 104 points in a 164–74 win over Grace Christian College in the Tiong Lian tournament. He simultaneously made 37 field goals, and also had 24 rebounds and six steals. At that point, no player had ever scored at least 100 points since Felix Duhig of the Cebu Institute of Technology hit the mark during a 1990 game in what is now the Cebu Schools Athletic Foundation, Inc.

== College career ==
=== Rookie season ===
Teng would suit up for the De La Salle Green Archers in the UAAP where he would instantly become the face of the Archers. He led the Archers through their chase to return to the Final Four. In a win over the NU Bulldogs, he matched Bobby Ray Parks' 35 points with his own 35 points, six rebounds, and two assists. In their second round encounter against his older brother Jeric's team the UST Growling Tigers, Teng would nail the game winner over one time RP-Youth teammate Kevin Ferrer, as the Archers avenged their first round defeat against the Tigers with a 53–51 win. Teng would lead the Archers back to the Final Four after missing out the previous season which included winning a knock-out game for the last slot against the FEU Tamaraws. However, the Archers led by Teng's magic run would be stopped when they lost to one of their notable sports rivals and eventual champions, the far more seasoned Ateneo Blue Eagles. Teng would later be named UAAP Rookie of the Year, achieving the same feat his older brother Jeric had done in 2009. In addition to that, he would also be simultaneously named to the Mythical Five, a rare feat in collegiate basketball. Teng finished his rookie season with averages of 15.8 points per game, 6.6 rebounds per game, and 2.8 assists per game while making 42% of his shots.

=== Second season and championship ===
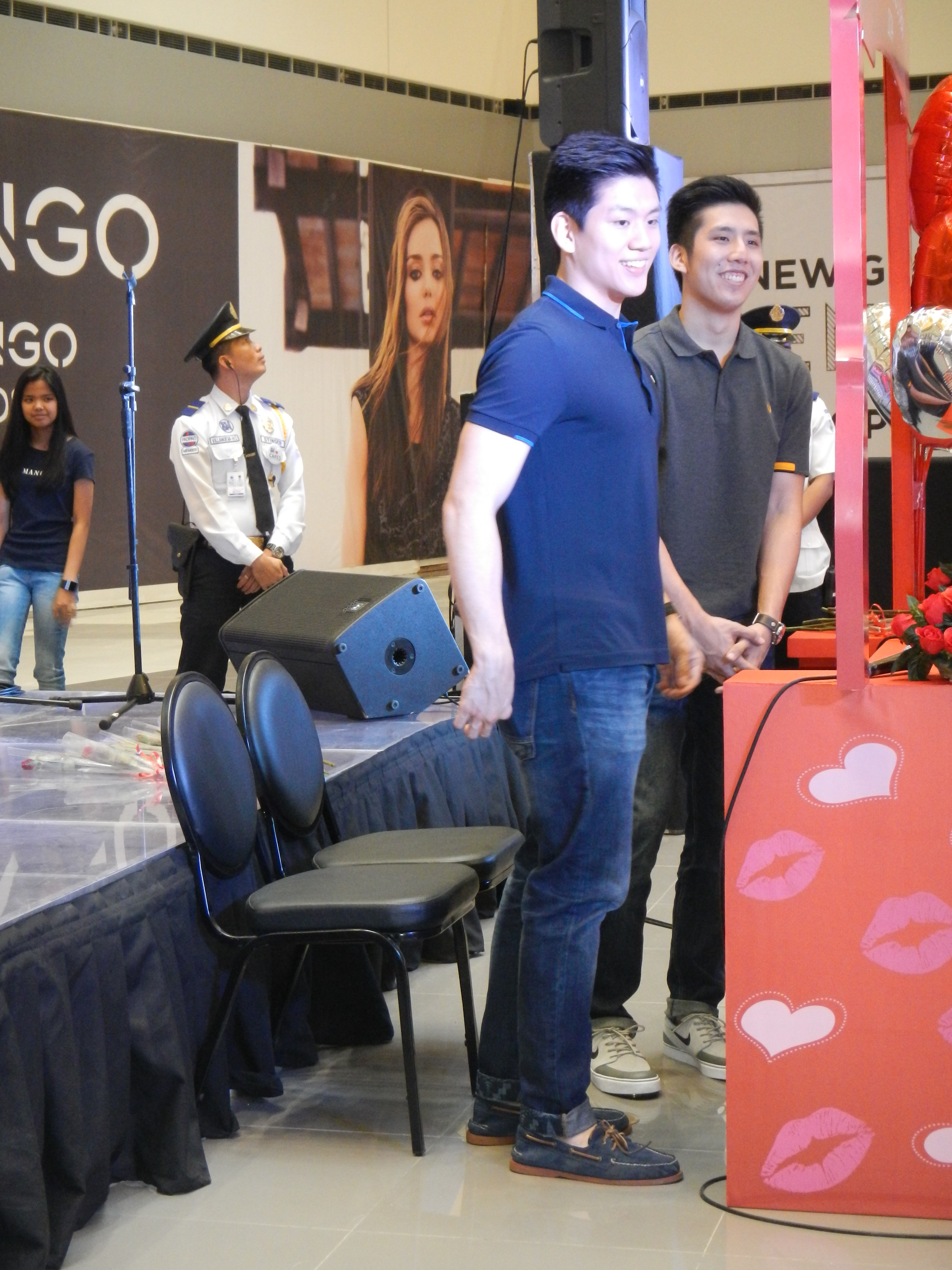
Jeron with brother Jeric.

In his second season, the Green Archers underwent a coaching change before the start of the new UAAP season as assistant coach Juno Sauler became the new head coach of the Archers by replacing Gee Abanilla, who went on to become the new head coach of the PBA's Petron Blaze Boosters. The change would later prove to be vital for Teng's legendary collegiate career. The Archers started the season with a 3–4 record after the first round of eliminations, but would sweep the second round of eliminations that included yet another game winner from Teng, this time against their rivals in the Blue Eagles. The Archers finished the elimination round with a 10–4 record, good for a three-way tie with the NU Bulldogs and the FEU Tamaraws. However, the Bulldogs got the #1 seed as they had the higher quotient among the three teams. The Archers and Tamaraws fought for the #2 seed and the twice-to-beat advantage in the Final Four which the Archers won 74–69. The Archers would defeat the Tamaraws again to advance to the UAAP Finals for the first time since 2008. Teng displayed brilliance by severely outplaying the then-reigning MVP Terrence Romeo of the Tamaraws. There they faced one of their famed rivals the UST Growling Tigers as Jeron battled the team of his older brother Jeric. The Tigers won Game 1 of the UAAP Finals, but Teng led the Archers to the championship by dominating the next two games of the series to defeat the Tigers and give the Archers their first UAAP title since 2007. Teng would later be crowned the Finals MVP. Teng finished his sophomore campaign averaging 15.3 points per game, 7.2 rebounds per game, and 3.1 assists per game while shooting 41% from the field.

=== Third season ===
Teng and the Green Archers would have another stellar season as the favorites to win the title, but they wound up losing to their arch-rivals the FEU Tamaraws after going the distance in the final four. This happened despite the fact that the Green Archers had exactly the same record as the previous season at 10 wins and four losses. The Tamaraws would lose to the National University Bulldogs in the finals. This semifinals loss against FEU prevented the Archers from winning back to back championships. At that time, Teng had a career high average of 18.1 ppg, alongside 7.1 rpg, 4 apg, while shooting 75 percent from the free throw line. This included a memorable 32 point outburst under 40 minutes of play against the Blue Eagles on August 17, 2014. During the finals between the Tamaraws and the NU Bulldogs, Teng would be honored with another Mythical Five selection.

Coach Sauler allowed Teng to thrive through the use of a 14-man rotation system that granted Teng more opportunities to dominate and take over games for the Green Archers. This strategy was an extension of the one used in the previous championship season where the team handily won with even lesser players on the roster.

=== Fourth season ===
For the first time since 2011, the Green Archers would miss the final four along with Teng missing the final four for the first time during his stint with the Green Archers, despite grabbing another Mythical Five honor yet again. This allowed Teng to tie legends such as former FEU Tamaraw Arwind Santos with three Mythical Five selections.

=== Final season and second UAAP championship ===
In his final season with the Green Archers, Coach Aldin Ayo took over the coaching staff following the resignation of Juno Sauler, who resigned after UAAP Season 78. Aldin Ayo would become the master strategist after winning an NCAA Basketball Championship as head coach of the Letran Knights, ending the five-peat of the San Beda Red Lions. Coach Ayo would now experience a season far different from his Cinderella run in the NCAA. This was a move for Teng's legacy as the King Archer led La Salle to a famous 12–0 run until they lost to the Ateneo Blue Eagles in their penultimate game. Teng would win one last Mythical Five honor in his final year and carry the team through the elimination round with a 13–1 record that gave the Green Archers the first seed. Teng would be once again named finals MVP after he dominated the series and captained the team to sweep the Ateneo Blue Eagles in the finals. This included a 28-point game to clinch the series and his career.

== Semi-professional career ==
=== PBA D-League ===
After being picked first in the PBA D-League draft, Teng suited up for the AMA University Titans and exploded with 42 points, seven rebounds, and six assists in his debut against Batangas in the Aspirant's Cup, which was the first conference of the 2017 season.

After a successful first conference, Teng signed with the FilOil Flying V Thunder and immediately brought the team to the top seed, which included a rare triple double against his old team, AMA Online Education. Coach Eric Altamirano, who would immediately join Teng as an assistant coach for the Alaska Aces weeks before the team drafted him, compared Teng to then Lakers star Lonzo Ball. The elated Coach Altamirano, who won titles in the UAAP and the PBA quoted, "Tonight, he showed that he can also be a Lonzo Ball."

After becoming just the fourth player in D-league history to record a triple double, Teng would do it once again scoring 20 points, together with 16 rebounds and 10 assists. "That’s something he can always have (triple-double) when he gets into the PBA. I think he’s really working on it, yung 'complete game' niya, the other dimensions of his game,” said Altamirano.

Teng would finish with two stellar conferences and reach the bare minimum for application to the 2017 PBA draft.

== Professional career ==
=== Alaska Aces (2017–2022) ===
On October 29, 2017, with an official height of 6'1 3/4 Teng was drafted 5th overall by the Alaska Aces.

Already a proven star after his first few games, on January 14, 2018, Teng immediately grabbed player of the game honors after scoring 23 points and pulling down nine boards against the Kia Picanto. Together with star Calvin Abueva, the duo helped drastically improve the Aces' record after coming off a four-game losing streak in the previous year. He made his first Finals appearance in the Governor's Cup, where the Aces lost to the Magnolia Hotshots. He ended the year a member of the All-Rookie Team.

In the 2019 Commissioner's Cup, Teng had a career-high 15 rebounds in a win against the NLEX Road Warriors. He then had a hamstring injury, causing him to rest for two weeks. He returned in the Governors' Cup against the Rain or Shine Elasto Painters and had 18 points, 9 rebounds, and 2 assists in the win. A few games after that, he suffered a knee injury, which was later revealed to be a hyperextended knee, causing him to rest for another two weeks.

After the 2020 season, Teng signed a three-year deal with the Aces.

On February 19, 2022, he had a PBA career-high 30 points (with 14 in the fourth quarter) to rally Alaska to a win over the Terrafirma Dyip in the Governors' Cup.

=== Converge FiberXers (2022–2023) ===
After the 2021 season, the Alaska Aces franchise was bought by Converge ICT, who renamed the team as the Converge FiberXers. In their debut, he had 23 points and 13 rebounds but they lost to Rain or Shine. He then led Converge to their first win in franchise history with 19 points and seven rebounds. However, he missed the rest of the conference due to a hip injury. He returned in the Commissioner's Cup with Ayo, his coach at DLSU, as his head coach once again. In a win over the TNT Tropang Giga, he contributed 22 points with four triples as the team hit a franchise-record 21 triples. He then had a season-high 25 points with nine rebounds and four assists in a win over the Phoenix Super LPG Fuel Masters. He followed that up with 20 points in a win over Rain or Shine. For his performance, he was awarded Player of the Week. In that conference, Converge made it to the quarterfinals, where they were swept by the San Miguel Beermen. In the Governors' Cup, he helped Converge get its largest win in franchise history by contributing 16 points and nine rebounds in a 30-point win over the NorthPort Batang Pier. Against the Blackwater Bossing, he had a double-double of 16 points and 10 rebounds. That conference, they were eliminated in the first round once again by the Beermen.

Teng became a restricted free agent on September 1, 2023, when his contract with Converge expired. He was subsequently released by the team on September 19, thereby becoming an unrestricted free agent.

=== San Miguel Beermen (2023–present) ===
On October 18, 2023, Teng signed a two-year contract with the San Miguel Beermen. He joined the team where his father, Alvin, formerly played from 1986 to 1994, winning nine championships.

== Career statistics ==
Legend
GP	Games played	MPG	Minutes per game	FG%	Field-goal percentage
3FG%	3-point field-goal percentage	4P%	4-point field-goal percentage	FT%	Free-throw percentage
RPG	Rebounds per game	APG	Assists per game	SPG	Steals per game
BPG	Blocks per game	PPG	Points per game	127	Career high

As of the end of 2025–26 season

=== PBA season-by-season averages ===
Year	Team	GP	MPG	FG%	3P%	4P%	FT%	RPG	APG	SPG	BPG	PPG
2017–18	Alaska	45	19.0	.391	.226	—	.635	3.4	1.6	.5	.1	7.1
2019	Alaska	32	27.0	.400	.280	—	.694	7.2	2.5	.4	.2	11.6
2020	Alaska	12	25.1	.414	.313	—	.760	4.9	4.3	.8	.3	11.3
2021	Alaska	24	24.7	.391	.239	—	.573	4.8	2.4	.8	.2	10.7
2022–23	Converge	30	27.5	.440	.316	—	.677	5.6	2.1	.4	.2	12.9
2023–24	San Miguel	28	8.8	.356	.267	—	.769	1.2	.7	.3	—	3.6
2024–25	San Miguel	29	6.9	.440	.200	.500	.649	1.1	.3	.2	—	4.1
2025–26	San Miguel	26	9.1	.417	.391	—	.525	1.8	.8	.3	.0	5.2
Career		226	18.2	.407	.285	.500	.658	3.7	1.6	.4	.1	8.1

=== College ===
==== Elimination rounds ====
Year	Team	GP	MPG	FG%	3P%	FT%	RPG	APG	SPG	BPG	PPG
2012–13	La Salle	14	32.5	.395	.344	.567	6.9	2.6	.1	.4	16.6
2013–14	La Salle	14	31.4	.387	.100	.530	6.6	2.6	.8	.6	14.6
2014–15	La Salle	14	31.1	.385	.278	.748	7.1	4.0	.6	.6	18.1
2015–16	La Salle	14	32.7	.411	.111	.631	6.6	3.6	.4	.4	18.3
2016–17	La Salle	12	27.4	.409	.400	.492	3.3	2.1	.8	.3	16.9
Career		68	31.1	.398	.255	.610	6.2	3.0	.5	.5	16.9

==== Playoffs ====
Year	Team	GP	MPG	FG%	3P%	FT%	RPG	APG	SPG	BPG	PPG
2013–14	La Salle	5	37.6	.366	.000	.643	7.0	3.7	1.1	.3	13.9
2014–15	La Salle	3	32.4	.370	.300	1.000	5.9	3.1	.0	.3	14.2
2016–17	La Salle	3	25.1	.529	.000	.818	3.8	2.1	.3	.7	21.8
Career		11	33.8	.413	.158	.726	6.0	3.1	.6	.4	15.8

== National team ==
=== 3x3 Tournaments ===
Teng was part of the first-ever Philippine team that took part in a 3x3 worldwide competition, along with Bobby Ray Parks Jr., Mike Tolomia, and Michael Pate in the 2010 Youth Olympic Games in Singapore.

Along with Kiefer Ravena, Parks Jr., and Kevin Ferrer, Teng competed at the 2013 FIBA Asia 3X3 Championship as part of the Philippine national 3x3 team.

Teng represented the Philippines in the 2017 FIBA 3x3 World Cup on June 17 to 21, 2017 in Nantes, France. They finished the tournament at 11th place.

=== 2017 Fiba Asia Champions Cup ===
Teng also starred for the 2017 Gilas Pilipinas team and led them all the way to fifth place with noteworthy performances against many of the top nations in basketball.

One of Teng's best games came on September 24, 2017, against the Mono Vampire, an Asean Basketball League (ABL) team which represented the national men's basketball team of Thailand. Teng scored 17 points as the national team won 115–102.

== Off the court ==
In 2014, Teng first met Jeanine Beatrice Tsoi, a sports commentator, during UAAP Season 77 at De La Salle University. On March 21, 2022, Teng proposed to Tsoi. On October 15, 2023, they married at the San Agustin Church. In June 2024, the couple announced they are expecting their first child in an Instagram post.

=== TV appearances ===
After the UAAP Season 76 Finals, he and his brother Jeric made rounds of TV guestings in shows like Minute to Win It, The Ryzza Mae Show, The Bottomline with Boy Abunda, Wish Ko Lang, Aquino & Abunda Tonight, The Buzz, and ASAP 18. Jeron was a hurado (judge) for It's Showtime from November 4 to 9, 2013.

Teng made his acting debut in the top-rated weeknight series Got to Believe (as collegiate basketball superstar "Allen Chua"). He was rumored to be in the cast of Kubot: The Aswang Chronicles 2 (2014), the sequel to Tiktik: The Aswang Chronicles (2012).

In 2017, Teng appeared in Meant to Be which aired on GMA Network as himself.

=== Stabbing incident ===
On June 3, 2018, Teng, along with Norbert Torres and Thomas Torres, were stabbed in a parking lot attack early that day. They recovered at St. Luke's Medical Center.

== Awards and achievements ==
Metro Manila Tiong Lian Basketball League:

- Most Valuable Player (2010, 2011, 2012)

UAAP Men's Basketball:

- UAAP Champion (Season 76, Season 79)
- Rookie of the Year (Season 75)
- Mythical Five (Season 75, Season 77, Season 78, Season 79)
- Finals MVP (Season 76, Season 79)
- RCBC Savings Bank My Loans Life-Changing Player of the Season (Season 76)

FilOil Flying V Cup:

- Mythical Five (2014)
- Finals MVP (2014)

PCCL:

- Mythical Five (2013)
- Finals MVP (2013)

Others:

- 2013 Collegiate Basketball Awards: Smart Player of the Year & Collegiate Mythical Five

Non-athletic:

- Candy Mag Reader's Choice Award: Best Basketball Player
- Nickelodeon Kids' Choice Awards 2016: Favorite Asian Sports Star

== See also ==
- List of basketball players who have scored 100 points in a single game

Preceded by Jeric Teng	PCCL Finals MVP; 2013	Succeeded by Ola Adeogun
