= Jeric Teng =

Filipino basketball player (born 1991)

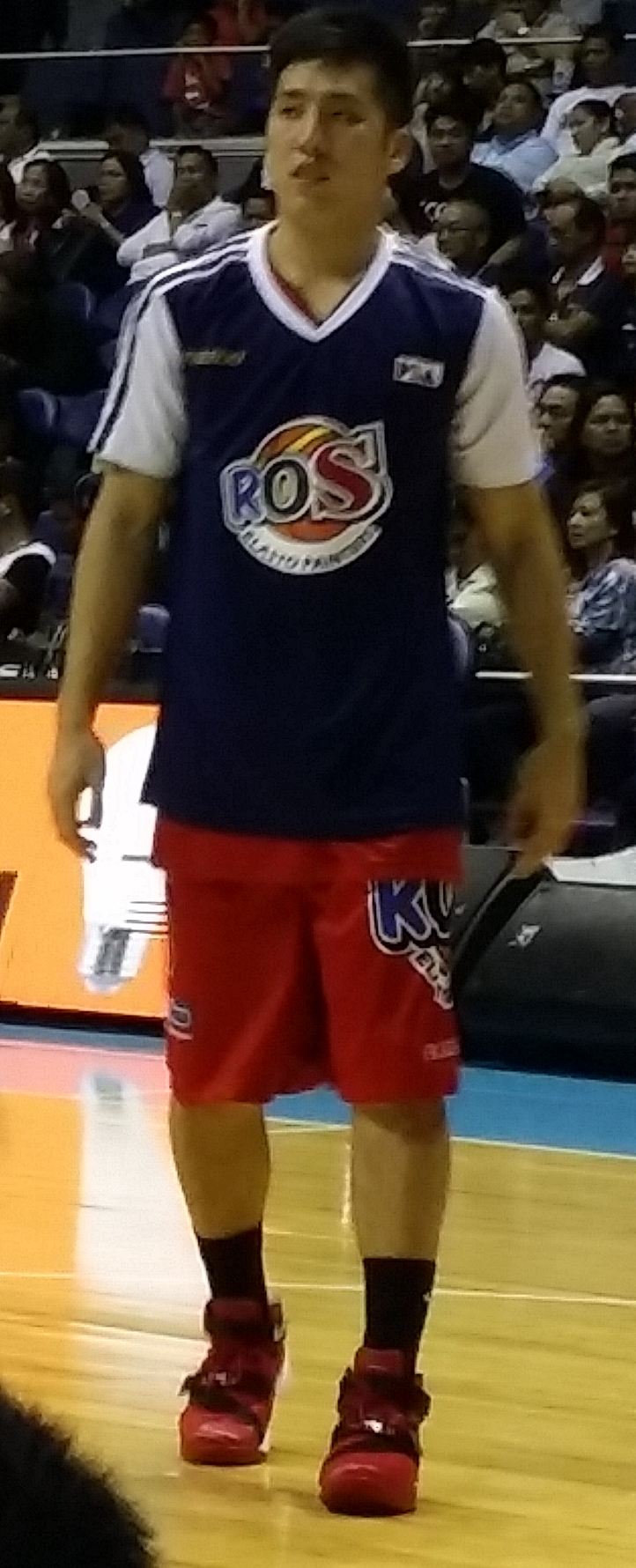
- Teng with Rain or Shine in 2016.

Member of the Gumaca Municipal Council
- Incumbent
- Assumed office June 30, 2025

Personal details
- Born: March 18, 1991 (age 35) Mandaluyong, Philippines
- Party: Stand Up Quezon
- Occupation: Athlete, politician
- Basketball career

Quezon Huskers
- Title: Assistant coach
- League: MPBL

Personal information
- Listed height: 6 ft 2 in (1.88 m)
- Listed weight: 175 lb (79 kg)

Career information
- High school: Xavier School (San Juan)
- College: UST
- PBA draft: 2013: 2nd round, 12th overall pick
- Drafted by: Rain or Shine Elasto Painters
- Playing career: 2013–2023
- Position: Shooting guard
- Coaching career: 2025–present

Career history

Playing
- 2013–2016: Rain or Shine Elasto Painters
- 2016–2017: Mahindra Floodbuster / Kia Picanto
- 2018–2019: NorthPort Batang Pier
- 2019–2021: Pasig Sta. Lucia Realtors
- 2023: Quezon Huskers

Coaching
- 2025–present: Quezon Huskers (assistant)

Career highlights
- PBA champion (2016 Commissioner's); All-MPBL First Team (2020); MPBL All-Star (2020); UAAP Rookie of the Year (2009); PCCL champion (2012); PCCL Finals MVP (2012); PCCL Most Valuable Player (2012); PCCL Mythical Five (2012); Williams Jones Cup Gold Medalist (2016)

Jeric Allen Uy Teng (born March 18, 1991) is a Filipino former professional basketball, player, coach and politician. He currently serves as an assistant coach for the Quezon Huskers of the Maharlika Pilipinas Basketball League (MPBL). He was drafted 12th overall by Rain or Shine in the 2013 PBA draft. He played college ball for the UST Growling Tigers in the UAAP.

Teng is currently serving as councilor of Gumaca, Quezon.

== College career ==
=== Rookie season ===
Teng joined the Tigers in 2009 where he won the Rookie of the Year award. In that season, he was joined by veterans Dylan Ababou and Khasim Mirza to form UST's ATM trio. The Tigers finished the season 6–8 and made it to the Final Four, but were defeated by the Ateneo Blue Eagles in the Final Four 64–81. Teng finished the season averaging 11.3 points per game, 4.0 rebounds per game and 1.5 assists per game.

=== Second season ===
In his second season, Teng led the Tigers in scoring averaging 12.9 points per game, along with 4.3 rebounds per game and 1.9 assists per game while shooting 39% from 3 point range. Unfortunately, with the Tigers losing Ababou and Mirza due to graduation, the inexperienced Tigers failed to return to the Final Four and finished 7th in the standings at 4–10 ahead of the UP Fighting Maroons.

=== Junior season ===
In his third season, Teng improved his numbers averaging 13.5 points per game, 4.7 rebounds per game and 2.4 assists per game. Together with Jeric Fortuna, Chris Camus and rookie center Karim Abdul, the Tigers finished the season in 4th place with an 8–6 record and returned to the Final Four. But the Tigers failed to advance further as they lost to the eventual champion Ateneo Blue Eagles 66–69.

=== Fourth season ===
In his fourth season, Teng was named the co-captain of the Tigers with Jeric Fortuna as the captain. In a game against the NU Bulldogs, Teng led the Tigers by scoring 15 of his 21 points as the Tigers came back from a double digit lead against the Bulldogs to win the game 89–71. Teng scored a career-high 26 points as the Tigers defeated the UE Red Warriors 87–75 to clinch a Final Four berth. The Tigers were able to advance to the UAAP Final Four as the #2 seed with a 10–4 record in the elimination round, they were able to defeat the NU Bulldogs to advance to the UAAP Finals and faced off against the Ateneo Blue Eagles but were swept in the Finals 2–0 as the Blue Eagles completed their five-peat. Teng finished the season averaging 13.6 points per game, 4.3 rebounds per game, 1.3 assists per game, 38% shooting from the field, 34% shooting from 3 point range and 70% shooting from the free throw line.

In the Philippine Collegiate Champions League later that year, Teng would play a key part in the Tigers run in the tournament as they first won the Metro Manila-Luzon tournament by defeating both the Letran Knights and the Adamson Soaring Falcons to enter into the PCCL Final Four with the Ateneo Blue Eagles, San Beda Red Lions and the Southwestern U Cobras. The Tigers would finish with a 2–1 record in the Final Four to set up a rematch with the Blue Eagles in the Finals, where the Tigers exacted their revenge against the Eagles as they were crowned the National Champions after winning the title in a tightly contested three-game series. Teng would later be named to the Mythical Five team for the tournament alongside graduating teammate Jeric Fortuna and Karim Abdul, Teng would also be crowned the Finals MVP of the tournament.

=== Final season ===
In his final season, Teng was named the captain of the Tigers with Clark Bautista as co-captain. Teng started the season as one of the leading candidates for the season MVP. However, in their first round encounter against the NU Bulldogs, he suffered from a shoulder injury after he got hit by Bulldogs forward Jeoffrey Javillonar. Teng would miss five games from the injury as the Tigers struggled in his absence. Teng returned to the lineup in the second round encounter with the Bulldogs, however he re-injured himself, this time on his right hamstring. Teng would make a quick recovery, and then in their battle with the Ateneo Blue Eagles for the last slot in the Final Four, he would hit five clutch free throws as the Tigers ended Ateneo's five year title run with an 82–74 victory that booked them a ticket to the Final Four. The Tigers would later stun the top seeded Bulldogs as they won two straight games to return to the UAAP Finals for the second straight season. The Tigers would battle the De La Salle Green Archers in the Finals in which Jeric battled his younger brother Jeron for the championship. He played brilliantly in the series against the Archers as he led the Tigers in scoring in the three-game series. However, the Tigers would fall short as the Archers came back after dropping Game 1 to win two straight games on their way to their first title since 2007. Teng finished his final season with the Tigers averaging 14.9 points per game, 3.7 rebounds per game, and 1.9 assists per game on 41% shooting from the field and 78% shooting from the free throw line.

== Professional career ==
=== Rain or Shine Elasto Painters ===
Immediately after his stint with the Growling Tigers, Teng signed up for the 2013 PBA draft. In the 2013 PBA Draft, he was drafted in the second round, 12th overall by the Rain or Shine Elasto Painters. He played his first game with the Elasto Painters in Davao City against the Alaska Aces as part of the Luzon-Visayas-Mindanao triple header to open the new PBA season. His first taste of the PBA Championship happened during the 2016 Commissioner's Cup, wherein the Rain or Shine smothered Alaska 4–2.

On November 3, 2016, he was waived by the Elasto Painters.

=== Mahindra Floodbuster ===
He was signed by the Floodbuster.

=== J&T Express ===
In 2022, Teng joined the PBA 3x3 team J&T Express.

== Political career ==
Teng ran and won in the 2025 Quezon local elections as councilor of Gumaca.

== Career statistics ==
Legend
GP	Games played	MPG	Minutes per game
FG%	Field-goal percentage	3P%	3-point field-goal percentage	FT%	Free-throw percentage
RPG	Rebounds per game	APG	Assists per game	SPG	Steals per game
BPG	Blocks per game	PPG	Points per game	**Bold**	Career high

Correct as of October 26, 2015

=== PBA season-by-season averages ===
Year	Team	GP	MPG	FG%	3P%	FT%	RPG	APG	SPG	BPG	PPG
2013–14	Rain or Shine	**45**	**10.0**	.285	.171	**.702**	1.3	**.6**	.1	.1	2.6
2014–15	Rain or Shine	19	9.2	.378	.255	.591	1.3	.2	**.2**	**.2**	**3.8**
2015–16	Rain or Shine	19	9.3	**.426**	**.273**	.500	**1.4**	.3	.1	.1	3.6
Career		83	9.6	.347	.238	.649	1.3	.5	.1	.1	3.1

=== College averages ===
Year	Team	GP	MPG	FG%	3P%	FT%	RPG	APG	SPG	BPG	PPG
2009-10	UST	**15**	23.3	**.400**	.262	**.794**	4.4	1.5	**.8**	.2	11.3
2010-11	UST	14	29.4	.347	.338	.690	4.3	1.9	**.8**	.1	12.9
2011-12	UST	12	29.4	.313	.242	.754	4.7	**2.4**	**.8**	**.3**	13.5
2012-13	UST	12	**30.8**	.399	**.358**	.703	**5.0**	1.4	**.8**	.0	**15.0**
2013-14	UST	12	29.3	.374	.275	.778	4.7	1.9	.6	.0	14.9
Career		65	28.3	.365	.298	.750	4.6	1.8	.7	.1	13.4

== Personal life ==
Teng was born on March 18, 1991, to Alvin and Susan Teng. He is the second oldest among four siblings. He has two sisters, Alyssa and Almira and a younger brother, Jeron. His father, Alvin Teng, is a former player with the Philippine Basketball Association who won multiple titles as a member of the San Miguel Beermen. His younger brother, Jeron, is also a professional basketball player for the San Miguel Beermen. Both Jeric and Jeron played for the Xavier Golden Stallions.
