= Jeric Fortuna =

Filipino basketball player

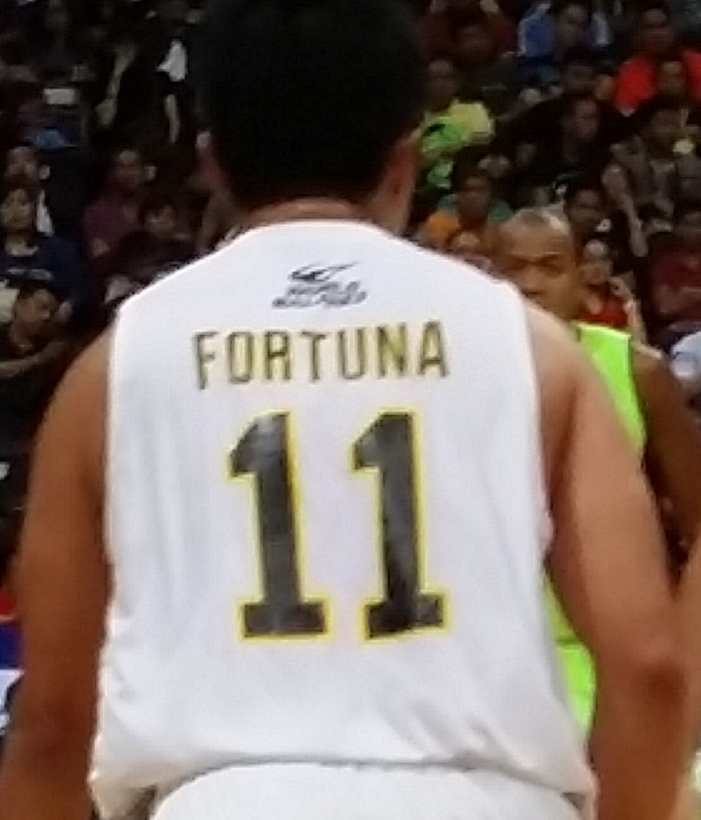
- Fortuna with the Barako Bull Energy in 2015

UST Growling Tigers
- Title: Assistant coach
- League: UAAP

Personal information
- Born: November 25, 1991 (age 34) Parañaque, Philippines
- Listed height: 5 ft 8 in (1.73 m)
- Listed weight: 170 lb (77 kg)

Career information
- High school: DLSZ (Muntinlupa)
- College: UST
- PBA draft: 2013: 2nd round, 14th overall pick
- Drafted by: Barako Bull Energy
- Playing career: 2012–2020
- Position: Point guard
- Coaching career: 2023–present

Career history

Playing
- 2012–2013: San Miguel Beermen (ABL)
- 2013–2014: Barako Bull Energy
- 2014–2015: San Miguel Beermen
- 2015–2016: Barako Bull Energy
- 2016: Phoenix Fuel Masters
- 2016: GlobalPort Batang Pier
- 2016–2017: Alab Pilipinas
- 2018: NorthPort Batang Pier
- 2019–2020: Manila Stars

Coaching
- 2023–present: UST (assistant)

Career highlights
- 2× PBA champion (2014–15 Philippine, 2015 Governors'); ABL champion (2013); PCCL champion (2012); PCCL Mythical Five (2012)

Jeric Marco Gray Fortuna (born November 25, 1991) is a Filipino professional basketball coach and former player. He was drafted 14th overall by the Barako Bull Energy in the 2013 PBA draft. He is an assistant coach for the UST Growling Tigers of the University Athletic Association of the Philippines (UAAP).

== College career ==
=== Rookie season ===
Fortuna joined the UST Growling Tigers in 2008. Fortuna played limited minutes with the Tigers in favor of veteran point guard Japs Cuan during his rookie season and finished with averages of 3.7 points per game, 1.7 assists per game and 1.7 rebounds per game.

=== Second season ===
In his second season, Fortuna became the starting point guard for the Tigers replacing the already graduated Cuan. The Tigers finished the season 6-8 and made it to the Final Four, but were defeated by the Ateneo Blue Eagles in the Final Four 64–81. In his first season as the starting point guard, Fortuna finished the season averaging 8.0 points per game, 4.0 assists per game where he leads the team, 3.3 rebounds per game, 1.6 steals per game and 46% shooting from 3 point range which allowed him to win the Star Shooter award for the season.

=== Third season ===
In his third season, Fortuna once again led the Tigers in assists averaging 10.4 points per game, 4.7 assists per game, 3.7 rebounds per game and 1.1 steals per game. It was in this season when Fortuna set a UAAP career high 29 points in 87–81 victory against the UP Fighting Maroons. Unfortunately, the inexperienced Tigers failed to return to the Final Four and finished 7th in the standings at 4-10 ahead of the UP Fighting Maroons.

=== Fourth season ===
In his fourth season, Fortuna led the Tigers in scoring and assists averaging 14.6 points per game, 4.8 rebounds per game, 3.1 assists per game and 1.4 steals per game. Together with Jeric Teng, Chris Camus and rookie center Karim Abdul, the Tigers finished the season in 4th place with an 8–6 record and returned to the Final Four. In their Final Four match-up against the Ateneo Blue Eagles, Fortuna had the chance to send the game into overtime with a three pointer, but his shot came too strong as the Tigers were knocked out by the Blue Eagles to advance to the Finals 66–69.

=== Final season ===
In his final season with the Tigers, Fortuna was named the captain of the Tigers with Jeric Teng as the co-captain. In their second round meeting against the NU Bulldogs, Fortuna sank in a three pointer to tie the game at 51 and send it into overtime, in which the Tigers won 58–57. The Tigers were able to advance to the UAAP Final Four as the #2 seed with a 10–4 record in the elimination round, they were able to defeat the NU Bulldogs to advance to the UAAP Finals and faced off against the Ateneo Blue Eagles but were swept in the Finals 2–0 as the Blue Eagles completed their five-peat. In his final season with the Tigers, Fortuna averaged 8.8 points per game, a league-leading 5.1 assists per game and 5.2 rebounds per game on 34% shooting from the field and 76% shooting from the free throw line.

In the Philippine Collegiate Champions League later that year, Fortuna would play a key part in the Tigers run in the tournament as they first won the Metro Manila-Luzon tournament by defeating both the Letran Knights and the Adamson Soaring Falcons to enter into the PCCL Final Four with the Ateneo Blue Eagles, San Beda Red Lions and the Southwestern U Cobras. The Tigers would finish with a 2–1 record in the Final Four to set up a rematch with the Blue Eagles in the Finals, where the Tigers exacted their revenge against the Eagles as they were crowned the National Champions after winning the title in a tightly contested three-game series. Fortuna would later be named to the Mythical Five team for the tournament alongside teammates Karim Abdul and Jeric Teng who was crowned Finals MVP.

== Professional career ==
=== San Miguel Beermen (ABL) ===
After the collegiate basketball season, Fortuna would start training for the San Miguel Beermen of the ASEAN Basketball League. Fortuna eventually made it into the lineup in the new ABL season, and would play a key part during their run to the championship as the Beermen were led by veterans like Asi Taulava and Chris Banchero. The Beermen would win the title against the Indonesia Warriors in a three-game sweep.

=== Barako Bull Energy ===
Fortuna was drafted 14th overall by Barako Bull in the 2013 PBA Draft.

=== San Miguel Beermen ===
Fortuna was traded to the San Miguel Beermen for 3rd stringer Paolo Hubalde where he was reunited with head coach Leo Austria who was also his coach on the Beermen's ABL team. During his tenure with the Beermen, Fortuna won two championships at both the Philippine Cup and Governors Cup.

=== Back to Barako Bull ===
On August 25, 2015, Jeric Fortuna was traded to the Barako Bull Energy (now known as Phoenix Fuel Masters) for Brian Heruela.

=== Trade to GlobalPort ===
On March 1, 2016, Fortuna was traded from Phoenix to GlobalPort Batang Pier, in exchange of the 2nd-round draft pick of the 2018 PBA draft. Fortuna, will reunite with his former collegiate coach Pido Jarencio in his new team.

== PBA career statistics ==
Legend
GP	Games played	MPG	Minutes per game
FG%	Field-goal percentage	3P%	3-point field-goal percentage	FT%	Free-throw percentage
RPG	Rebounds per game	APG	Assists per game	SPG	Steals per game
BPG	Blocks per game	PPG	Points per game	**Bold**	Career high

Correct as of September 14, 2016

=== Season-by-season averages ===
Year	Team	GP	MPG	FG%	3P%	FT%	RPG	APG	SPG	BPG	PPG
2013–14	Barako Bull	23	**21.6**	.367	**.348**	**1.000**	**2.5**	**2.0**	**.4**	.0	**6.8**
2014–15	San Miguel / Barako Bull	**27**	9.0	**.378**	.255	.688	1.1	.6	.2	.0	3.2
2015–16	Barako Bull / GlobalPort	23	15.8	.368	.345	.750	2.0	1.3	**.4**	**.1**	5.1
Career		73	15.2	.370	.325	.767	1.8	1.3	.3	.0	4.9
