= 2013 Philippine Collegiate Championship =

2011 Philippine Collegiate Championship
Men's Finals	G1	G2	Wins
SWU Cobras	54	61	0
De La Salle Green Archers	64	70	2
- Duration: December 16–17
- Arena(s): Filoil Flying V Arena
- Finals MVP: Jeron Teng
- Winning coach: Juno Sauler
- Semifinalists: FEU Tamaraws; San Beda Red Lions
- TV network(s): Studio 23

The 2013 Philippine Collegiate Championship was the sixth edition of the Philippine Collegiate Champions League (PCCL), the postseason tournament to determine the national collegiate champions in basketball organized by the Samahang Basketbol ng Pilipinas (SBP), the national basketball federation. The tournament was the sixth edition of the tournament in its current incarnation, and the eleventh edition overall.

The De La Salle Green Archers defeated the SWU Cobras in the best-of-three championship series, 2–0. There was no third-place game in this year's edition of the tournament, and so the FEU Tamaraws and the San Beda Red Lions shared the third-place honors.

== Qualifying ==
#	UAAP	NCAA	CESAFI	Other leagues
1st	De La Salle Green Archers	San Beda Red Lions	UV Green Lancers	various
2nd	UST Growling Tigers	Letran Knights	SWU Cobras	—
3rd	FEU Tamaraws	San Sebastian Stags	USC Warriors	—
4th	NU Bulldogs	Perpetual Altas	—	—
5th	Ateneo Blue Eagles*	EAC Generals	—	—
6th	UE Red Warriors	Arellano Chiefs**	—	—

*Replaced by UP.
**Replaced by Lyceum.

Qualified to Final Four
Qualified to regionals
Qualified to zonals

=== Zonals ===
- 5th-6th NCAA and UAAP teams seeded to the Metro Manila regionals
- League champions from other than CESAFI, NCAA and UAAP are seeded to nearest zonal tournaments.

=== Regionals ===
- 2nd-4th UAAP and NCAA teams seeded to the Metro Manila–Luzon regionals
- Top 3 CESAFI teams seeded to the Southern regionals

=== Final four ===
- NCAA and UAAP champions qualify to the Final Four automatically.

== Zonals ==
The delay in the completion of NCAA Season 89 has led to the rescheduling of the qualifying tournaments. The tournaments were supposed to start on October 25.

=== Metro Manila ===
The Metro Manila zonals were held at the Technological Institute of the Philippines (TIP) gym from November 20 to 22.

==== Group A ====
Pos	Team	Pld	W	L	PCT	GB	Qualification	UE	TIP	LPU	LCC
1	UE Red Warriors	3	3	0	1.000	—	Qualified to the Metro Manila playoff		81–79	77–74	73–50
2	TIP Engineers	3	2	1	.667	1				84–78	75–61
3	Lyceum Pirates	3	1	2	.333	2					84–62
4	La Consolacion Scions	3	0	3	.000	3					

==== Group B ====
Pos	Team	Pld	W	L	PCT	GB	Qualification	CEU	EAC	UP	SFACS
1	CEU Scorpions	3	3	0	1.000	—	Qualified to the Metro Manila playoff		73–54	81–63	78–64
2	EAC Generals	3	2	1	.667	1					76–66
3	UP Fighting Maroons	3	1	2	.333	2					87–83
4	St. Francis Doves	3	0	3	.000	3					

=== Luzon ===
==== South Luzon/Bicol ====
- Quezon champion: Calayan Cougars
- Legaspi champion: STI Sta. Rosa Olympians
- Tabaco champion: Amando Cope Green Serpents
- Naga champion: Naga College Foundation Tigers
- Sorsogon champion: Lewis Blazing Fox
- Batangas champion: U of Batangas Brahmans

==== North/Central Luzon ====
The North/Central Luzon zonal was held at the University of Northern Philippines (UNP) gym from November 11 to 15.

- Vigan champion: UNP Sharks
- La Union champion: La Finns Scholastica Lionhearts
- Pampanga champion: Lyceum of Subic Bay Sharks
- Pangasinan champion: Lyceum Northwestern Dukes
- Baguio champion: U of Baguio Cardinals

===== Third-place playoff =====
November 11

U of Baguio Cardinals	82–87	La Finn's Scholastica Brave Hearts

University of Northern Philippines Gym, Vigan

===== Final =====
November 11

Lyceum of Subic Bay Sharks	86–74	Lyceum-NWU Dukes

University of Northern Philippines Gym, Vigan

=== Visayas ===
The Visayas zonals were supposed to be held at the Ormoc Superdome but due to the destruction of Typhoon Haiyan (Yolanda), the games were moved to the Cebu Coliseum. Also, due to the typhoon and to the Bohol earthquake a month earlier, the champions from Bohol (Bohol Institute of Technology-International College Crusaders) and Ormoc (Western Leyte College Mustangs) skipped the tournament.

November 15

ACSAT Dumaguete Lightnings	0–20	Iloilo Doctors Medics

Cebu Coliseum, Cebu City

=== Mindanao ===
==== Northern Mindanao ====
STI-Cagayan de Oro Olympians defeated St. Columbian College, St. Paul University of Surigao, Christ the King College de Maranding, Bukidnon State University, and Mindanao State University-Marawi and Medical Center in the Northern Mindanao zonals.

==== Southern Mindanao ====
The Southern Mindanao zonals was held at the Almendras Gym in Davao City from November 10 to 13.

===== Team standings =====
Pos	Team	Pld	W	L	PCT	GB	Qualification	HTC	AIFCP	JMC	SCC
1	HTC Wildcats	3	2	1	.667	—	Qualified to the zonal final			105–98	129–72
2	AIFCP Sailors	3	2	1	.667	—	Qualified to the zonal final	94–89		64–69	?–?
3	JMC Kings	3	2	1	.667	—					?–?
4	SCC Bulldogs	3	0	3	.000	2					

===== Third-place playoff =====
November 11

JMC Kings	78–70	SCC Bulldogs

Almendras Gym Davao Recreation Center, Davao City

===== Final =====
November 11

HTC Wildcats	84–71	AIFCP Sailors

Almendras Gym Davao Recreation Center, Davao City

== Regionals ==
=== Luzon–Metro Manila ===
The first two rounds were held at the First Asia Institute of Technology and Humanities (FAITH) Gym in Tanauan, Batangas from November 25 to 26; the final three rounds are held at the Ynares Sports Arena in Pasig from November 28 to December 3.

==== First 3 rounds ====
Zonal finals
UE	85
CEU	77
U of Batangas	88
Lyceum of Subic Bay	81

Second round
NU	70
Perpetual	67
UE	81
U of Batangas	60

Quarterfinals
NU	73
UE	63

==== Final 3 rounds ====
Quarterfinals
FEU	83
San Sebastian	73
NU	73
UE	63

Semifinals
UST	77
Letran	60
FEU	88
NU	70

Regional final
UST	68
FEU	71

=== Southern Islands ===
The Southern Islands regional was held at Cebu City's Cebu Coliseum from November 18 to 20.

Zonal finals
HTC	98
STI-Cagayan de Oro	94
USC	82
Iloilo Doctors	73

Semifinals
UV	100
HTC	80
SWU	82
USC	73

Regional final
UV	60
SWU	68

== Final four ==
Pos	Team	Pld	W	L	PCT	GB	Qualification	SWU	DLSU	FEU	SBC
1	SWU Cobras	3	2	1	.667	—	Qualified to the Finals				
2	De La Salle Green Archers	3	2	1	.667	—	Qualified to the Finals	58–68^{OT}		80–60	64–60
3	FEU Tamaraws	3	1	2	.333	1		71–86			62–56
4	San Beda Red Lions	3	1	2	.333	1		77–49			

== High school exhibition games ==
Studio 23

December 16

Hope Christian Soldiers	77–72	La Salle Green Hills Greenies

Filoil Flying V Arena, San Juan

Studio 23

December 17

La Salle Green Hills Greenies	73–84	NUNS Bullpups

Filoil Flying V Arena, San Juan

== Finals ==
Studio 23

December 16

SWU Cobras	54–64	De La Salle Green Archers

Filoil Flying V Arena, San Juan

Studio 23

December 17

SWU Cobras	61–70	De La Salle Green Archers
La Salle wins series 2–0

Filoil Flying V Arena, San Juan
