= Phoenix Super LPG Fuel Masters =

Philippine professional basketball team

- 2025–26 Phoenix Super LPG Fuel Masters season
- Founded: 2016
- History: Phoenix Fuel Masters (2016–2018, 2024–2025); Phoenix Pulse Fuel Masters (2019); Phoenix Super LPG Fuel Masters (2020–2024, 2026–present)
- Team colors: Teal, gray, black, white
- Company: Phoenix Petroleum Philippines, Inc.
- Board governor: Raymond Zorrilla
- Team manager: Paolo Bugia; Sheila Briones (assistant)
- Head coach: Charles Tiu
- Team captain: Ricci Rivero
- Ownership: Dennis Ang Uy
- Website: www.phoenixfuels.ph/phoenix-fuel-masters/

The Phoenix Super LPG Fuel Masters, or simply known as the Phoenix Fuel Masters, are a professional basketball team owned by Phoenix Petroleum Philippines, Inc., which debuted in the Philippine Basketball Association (PBA) in the 2016 Commissioner's Cup. The franchise began after the company acquired the second Barako Bull team in January 2016.

== History ==
=== Background ===
In March 2011, Phoenix Petroleum, a sponsor of the PBA games, had expressed interest in acquiring a PBA franchise and were in talks to acquire the franchise of the original Barako Bull Energy Boosters team, then-owned by the Energy Food and Drink, Inc. However, the team failed to get the two-thirds approval from the PBA Board of Governors to do so (the acquisition needed at least seven votes to proceed). Additionally, San Miguel Corporation would later rename one of their PBA teams, the San Miguel Beermen, to the Petron Blaze Boosters in the 2011 PBA Governors' Cup, thus putting a potential threat to Phoenix as SMC could block the competitor oil company's entry into the league. The Boosters would later revert their name back to SMB in 2014.

In July 2011, a majority share of Energy Food and Drink was acquired the Lina Group led by Alberto Lina, who also owned the original Air21 Express. This led to the Energy Boosters being renamed to the Shopinas.com Clickers and the original Express to the newer Barako Bull Energy Cola, later shortened to Barako Bull Energy.

=== Formation ===
In January 2016, Phoenix Petroleum acquired the newer Barako Bull Energy from the Lina Group in a deal that was reportedly worth ₱100 million. The PBA board of governors unanimously approved the sale on January 20. In addition, the board also gave its approval for Phoenix Petroleum to play in the 2016 PBA Commissioner's Cup instead of waiting until the 2016–17 PBA season. The coaching staff, players' contracts and contractual obligations were carried over by the new owners.

On February 10, the Phoenix Fuel masters formally announced their entry into the PBA in a press conference held at Novotel Manila. The team also unveiled their new uniforms during the press conference.

=== 2016–2017: Early seasons ===
Phoenix Fuel Masters' logo used during the 2016 Commissioner's Cup

The Fuel Masters debuted in the PBA with a 118–106 win over the NLEX Road Warriors at the 2016 PBA Commissioner's Cup, with Nigerian Kenny Adeleke as the team's import for the conference. After four games, he was waived and Kevinn Pinkney took his place as the team reinforcement. On May 31, 2016, Phoenix appointed Westports Malaysia Dragons head coach Ariel Vanguardia as the new head coach of the team, replacing Koy Banal

Phoenix's inaugural season also saw the team make multiple trades, with their most notable being the acquisition of 11-time PBA all-star Ronjay Buenafe from the Meralco Bolts. The team's best result during their inaugural season was an 8th place finish in the 2016 PBA Governors' Cup, which saw the team lose to the TNT KaTropa in the quarterfinals.

For the team's inaugural draft in 2016, Phoenix selected Matthew Wright during the special round of the draft and then selected Gelo Alolino with the second pick of the regular draft. Throughout the season, the team also made more trades, which brought RJ Jazul and Jeff Chan to the team. While the team saw improved results, including a 6–5 record in the 2015–16 PBA Philippine Cup, their first winning record, the team also failed to get past the quarterfinals in any of the three conferences.

=== 2017–2022: The Matthew Wright and Jason Perkins era ===
Phoenix Fuel Masters' logo used from 2016 to 2018.

In the 2017 PBA draft, the team selected Jason Perkins with the fourth pick. They also selected Sidney Onwubere with the eighth pick, but was later traded to the TNT KaTropa for Justin Chua. During the first two conferences of the season, the team failed to make the quarterfinals, finishing 9th and 10th in the 2017–18 Philippine Cup and 2018 Commissioner's Cup, respectively.

==== 2018–2020: Calvin Abueva arrives and first semifinals berths ====
Phoenix Pulse Fuel Masters' logo used in 2019.

On August 7, 2018, 10 days before the start of the Governors' Cup, the Fuel Masters traded Karl Dehesa and a draft pick for 2019 in exchange for Calvin Abueva. He along with Wright, Perkins and import Eugene Phelps led the team to its first twice to beat advantage berth in the quarterfinals after posting an 8–3 record in the eliminations but lost both games to the Meralco Bolts.

During the Philippine Cup of the following season, the team changed colors and logo from red and silver to black and red. They clinched the top seed and a consecutive twice to beat advantage in the quarterfinals with a 9–2 record. They defeated the Alaska Aces 91–76 before losing to the eventual champion San Miguel Beermen five games in the semifinals. Abueva got suspended indefinitely in June 2019 due to two infractions: clotheslining TNT KaTropa import Terrence Jones and doing obscene gestures to the girlfriend of Blackwater Elite player Bobby Parks Jr..

During the pandemic-shortened 2020 Philippine Cup bubble tournament, the team under the name Phoenix Super LPG Fuel Masters, paraded teal and blue as its colors and a new team logo. Topex Robinson was elevated to full-time head coach replacing Louie Alas and Willy Wilson joined the coaching staff after playing three seasons for the team. Abueva was allowed to re-join the roster in October 2020 after undergoing tests imposed by the league. The Fuel Master clinched a twice to beat advantage as the 2nd seed with an 8–3 record in the eliminations. They won against the Magnolia Hotshots 89–88 before losing to the TNT Tropang Giga two games to three in the semifinals. Several players won awards at the end of the tournament including Abueva and Wright as part of the Elite Five, RJ Jazul as Mr. Quality Minutes, Justin Chua as Defensive Player of the Tournament. Chua and Abueva also won as members of the All Bubble D-Fenders team. Veteran JC Intal retired at season's end.

==== 2021–2022: Abueva departs ====
On February 17, 2021, Calvin Abueva was traded to the Magnolia Pambansang Manok Hotshots in exchange for Chris Banchero. Six days later, on February 23, Phoenix acquired Vic Manuel from the Alaska Aces for Brian Heruela. The team fell to ninth in the eliminations of the 2021 PBA Philippine Cup, and lost in the eighth-seed playoff to Barangay Ginebra San Miguel. Later in the season, the Fuel Masters traded Manuel alongside Michael Calisaan to the NorthPort Batang Pier in exchange for Sean Anthony and Sean Manganti. The team saw slight improvement, going up to eight in the 2021 PBA Governors' Cup, beating NorthPort in the eighth-seed playoff but losing to advantage holders Magnolia in one game.

As the 2022–23 PBA season approached, Phoenix tried to bolster their roster by signing free agent Javee Mocon after acquiring his rights in a trade with the Rain or Shine Elasto Painters for Nick Demusis. While Phoenix didn't have any first-round picks for the PBA season 47 draft, the team selected four players in the second round alone, among them being Tyler Tio and Encho Serrano. The team did not make the playoffs in the 2022 PBA Philippine Cup after finishing 11th with a 3–8 record.

=== 2022–present: Rebuilding with Jason Perkins ===
Phoenix Fuel Masters' logo used from 2024 to 2025.

After the 2022 Philippine Cup, Matthew Wright's contract with Phoenix ended, and on September 2, 2022, he left the team to move to Japan's B.League. On January 18, 2023, the team traded Sean Anthony as well as Jake Pascual to the NLEX Road Warriors as part of a larger trade which saw the Fuel Masters acquire Jjay Alejandro and Raul Soyud for the TNT Tropang Giga. While the team was able to make the playoffs in both the 2022–23 Commissioner's Cup and 2023 Governors' Cup, the team still wasn't able to get through quarterfinals on both occasions.

In the PBA season 48 draft, the team used their sixth pick to select Kenneth Tuffin and then selected Raffy Verano and Ricci Rivero in the second round. The team also re-signed numerous players, including Jason Perkins to a max contract, but did lose Encho Serrano after he decided to move to the regional Maharlika Pilipinas Basketball League. For the 2023–24 PBA Commissioner's Cup, the team reinforced with Johnathan Williams as their import. The team finished with their best result since their semifinals run in 2020, a fourth-place finish with an 8–3 record, giving them the twice-to-beat advantage. In the quarterfinals, Phoenix was matched against the Meralco Bolts. Despite losing the first game, Phoenix utilized the advantage to win the second game and advance to the semifinals for the first time in just over three years. They then played against the Magnolia Chicken Timplados Hotshots, who they lost to in four games of the best-of-five series. They weren't able to replicate that performance in the following 2024 PBA Philippine Cup, where they missed the playoffs after falling to 11th place in eliminations.

In the PBA season 49 draft, Phoenix selected Kai Ballungay with the fourth pick. They then traded Javee Mocon to the NLEX Road Warriors to acquire Ato Ular. Unfortunately, the team didn't make the playoffs in all three conferences of the 2024–25 season, which led to the Fuel Masters having possession of the second pick of the upcoming PBA season 50 draft. During the 2025 off-season, the team traded Larry Muyang, who had an indefinite ban from the PBA, to Converge, and acquired Evan Nelle from the NorthPort Batang Pier. A day later, the team ended up trading their second pick to the Converge FiberXers for Bryan Santos and the eighth pick in the upcoming draft. Phoenix would use that eighth pick to select Will Gozum.

On January 20, 2026, they tapped Charles Tiu as their new head coach and, at the same time, reverted their team name back to Phoenix Super LPG Fuel Masters.

== Current roster ==
Phoenix Super LPG Fuel Masters roster
Players
Coaches

Pos.	#	POB	Name	Height	Weight	DOB (YYYY–MM–DD)	From
F	0	(Philippines)	Will Gozum	6 ft 6 in (1.98 m)	205 lb (93 kg)	1999–04–08	St. Benilde
F/C	1	(United States)	Kai Ballungay	6 ft 7 in (2.01 m)	215 lb (98 kg)	2001–11–16	Ateneo
F	3	(United States)	Jason Perkins	6 ft 4 in (1.93 m)	235 lb (107 kg)	1992–09–20	De La Salle
C	4	(United States)	Rafi Reavis	6 ft 8 in (2.03 m)	210 lb (95 kg)	1977–07–26	Coppin State
G	5	(Philippines)	Gian Mamuyac	6 ft 2 in (1.88 m)	165 lb (75 kg)	1999–03–05	Ateneo
F	7	(Philippines)	Sidney Onwubere	6 ft 4 in (1.93 m)		1993–08–01	Emilio Aguinaldo
C	9	(Philippines)	Justin Chua	6 ft 6 in (1.98 m)	245 lb (111 kg)	1989–07–13	Ateneo
G	13	(Italy)	JC Cullar	5 ft 10 in (1.78 m)		1997–01–26	St. Benilde
G/F	18	(Philippines)	Francis Escandor	6 ft 3 in (1.91 m)		1999–03–18	De La Salle
G	19	(Philippines)	Tyler Tio	6 ft 0 in (1.83 m)	170 lb (77 kg)	1998–04–05	Ateneo
G/F	20	(New Zealand)	Kenneth Tuffin	6 ft 4 in (1.93 m)		1997–05–05	Far Eastern
C	24	(Philippines)	Dave Ando	6 ft 7 in (2.01 m)		1999–10–25	UST
G	25	(Philippines)	Ricci Rivero	6 ft 1 in (1.85 m)	146 lb (66 kg)	1998–05–25	UP
F	26	(Philippines)	Bryan Santos	6 ft 5 in (1.96 m)	209 lb (95 kg)	1997–05–26	UST
G	27	(Philippines)	JL delos Santos	5 ft 11 in (1.80 m)	176 lb (80 kg)	1999–09–12	José Rizal
G	39	(Philippines)	Tony Ynot	6 ft 1 in (1.85 m)		2000–06–13	St. Benilde

Head coach

- (Philippines) Charles Tiu

Assistant coach(es)

- (Philippines) Jon Jacinto (1st assistant)
- (Philippines) Paolo Dizon
- (Philippines) Paolo Layug
- (Philippines) Ram Noriega
- (Philippines) TY Tang

Team manager

- (Philippines) Paolo Bugia
- (Philippines) Sheila Briones (assistant)

Legend

- (C) Team captain
- (CI) Commissioner's Cup Import
- (GI) Governors' Cup Import
- (EI) EASL Import
- (DP) Unsigned draft pick
- (FA) Free agent
- (IN) Inactive
- (S) Suspended
- (R) Rookie
- Injured

Roster

== Players of note ==
- Calvin Abueva
- Sean Anthony
- Cyrus Baguio
- Mac Baracael
- Ronjay Buenafe
- Mark Borboran
- Rodney Brondial
- Prince Caperal
- Jeff Chan
- Justin Chua
- Mark Cruz
- Simon Enciso
- James Forrester
- Jeric Fortuna
- RR Garcia
- Marvin Hayes
- JC Intal
- Doug Kramer
- Chico Lanete
- Alex Mallari
- Javee Mocon
- Emman Monfort
- Mick Pennisi
- Norbert Torres
- Josh Urbiztondo
- Jonathan Uyloan
- John Wilson
- Willy Wilson
- Matthew Wright

=== Imports ===
- (Nigeria) Kenny Adeleke
- (United States) Marcus Simmons
- (United States) Eugene Phelps
- (South Korea) Lee Gwan-hee
- (United States) Jameel McKay
- (United States) Brandon Brown
- (United States) James Dickey
- (United States) Robert Dozier
- (Israel) (United States) Richard Howell
- (United States) Alonzo Gee
- (United States) Paul Harris
- (United States) Kevinn Pinkney
- (United States) Dominique Sutton
- (United States) Kaleb Wesson
- (United States) Johnathan Williams

== Awards ==
=== Individual awards ===
PBA Rookie of the Year Award
- Jason Perkins (2017-18)
PBA All-Defensive Team
- Calvin Abueva (2020)
- Justin Chua (2020)
PBA Mythical First Team
- Calvin Abueva (2020)
- Matthew Wright (2020)
PBA Mythical Second Team
- Matthew Wright (2017-18, 2021)
- Jason Perkins (2023-24)
PBA Best Import
- Johnathan Williams (2023-24 Commissioner's Cup)

=== PBA Press Corps Individual Awards ===
PBA Defensive Player of the Year	Mr. Quality Minutes	All-Rookie Team
Justin Chua (2020)	RJ Jazul (2020)	Matthew Wright (2016-17); Jason Perkins (2017-18); Encho Serrano (2022-23); Tyler Tio (2022-23); Kenneth Tuffin (2023-24); Kai Ballungay (2024–25)

=== All-Star Weekend ===
All-Star MVP	Slam Dunk Contest	All-Star Selection
Matthew Wright (2017 Mindanao Leg, 2017 Luzon Leg); Jeff Chan (2018 Visayas Leg)	Rey Guevarra (2018, 2019)	2017: Cyrus Baguio; Norbert Torres; Matthew Wright; 2018: Jeff Chan; Matthew Wright; 2019: Calvin Abueva; Jason Perkins; 2024: Jason Perkins; Ricci Rivero; Tyler Tio (did not play)

== Front office ==
=== Coaches ===
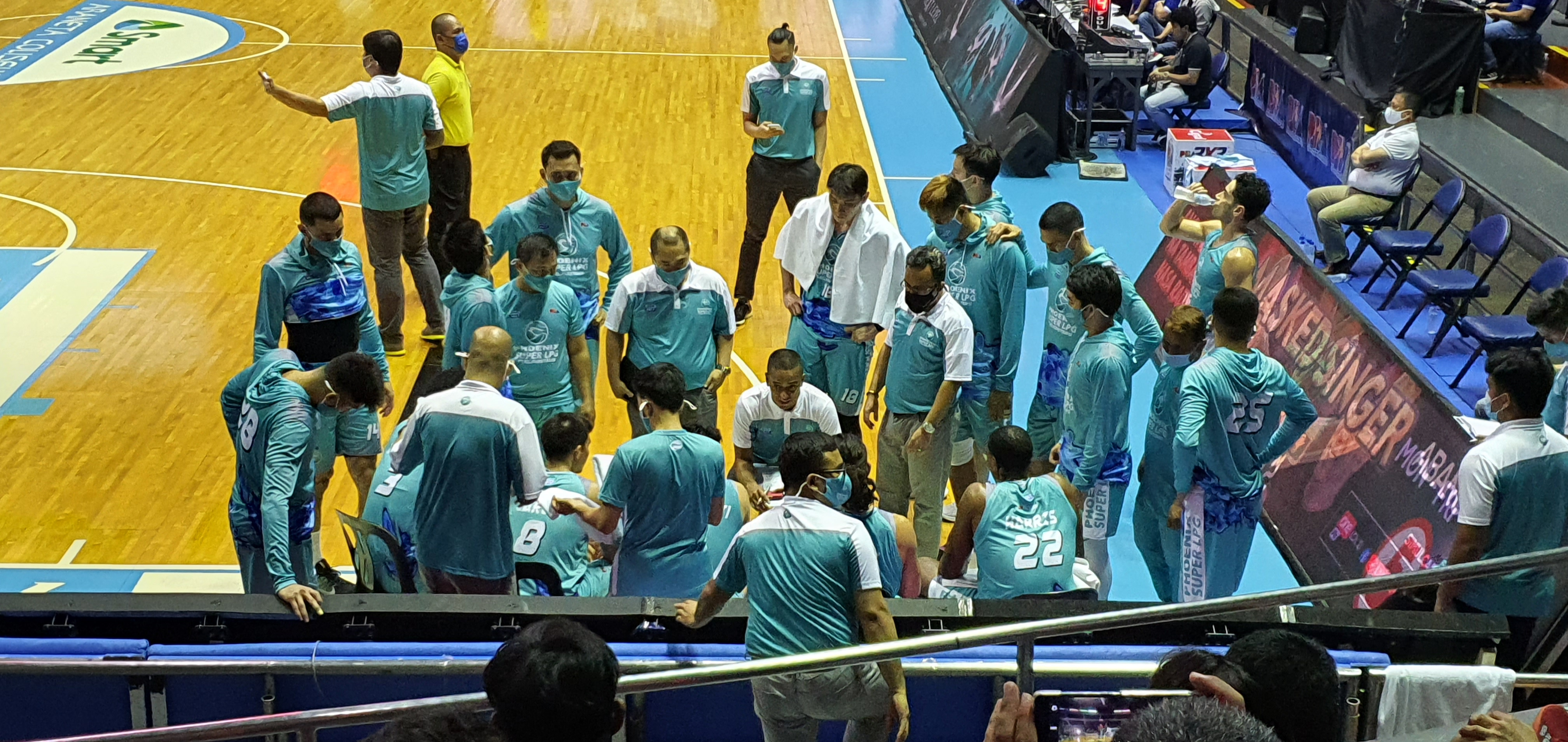
Topex Robinson and the Fuel Masters during a timeout.

Phoenix Super LPG Fuel Masters Head Coaches
#	Name	Start	End	Regular Season				Playoffs				Best Finish	Achievements
#	Name	Start	End	GC	W	L	Win%	GC	W	L	Win%	Best Finish	Achievements
1	Koy Banal	2016	2016	11	3	8	.273	0	0	0	–	N/A	N/A
2	Ariel Vanguardia	2016	2017	44	17	27	.386	5	1	4	.200	Quarterfinals	Quarterfinals
3	Louie Alas	2017	2019	66	33	33	.500	7	1	6	.857	Semifinals	Semifinals
4	Topex Robinson	2020	2023	56	26	30	.464	8	3	5	.375	Semifinals	Semifinals
5	Jamike Jarin	2023	2025	11	4	7	.364	7	2	5	.286	Semifinals	Semifinals
6	Willy Wilson	2025	2026	11	3	8	.273	0	0	0	–	N/A	N/A
7	Charles Tiu	2026	present										

Assistant coaches	Team Manager	Board Governor	Alternate Governor
Nic Belasco (2016–18); Justino Pinat (2016–17); Caesar Polhen (2016–19); Will Voigt (2017); Topex Robinson (2017–20); Carmelo Alas (2017 - 2019); Kristofer Reyes (2017 - 2021); Jamike Jarin (2020–23); Dondon Hontiveros (2022–23); Jon Jacinto (2017 – present); Willy Wilson (2020 –2025); Christien dela Cruz (2022 – 2026); Paolo Dizon (2022–present); Ian Anthony Sangco (2022 – 2025); Ryan Dy (2025 – 2026); Paolo Layug (2026 – present); Ram Noriega (2026 – present); TY Tang (2026 – present)	Paolo Bugia (2016 – present)	Dennis Ang Uy (2016–18); Raymond T. Zorrilla (2019 – present)	Raymond T. Zorrilla (2016 – present)

== Season-by-season records ==
List of the last five conferences completed by the Phoenix franchise. For the full-season history, see List of Phoenix Super LPG Fuel Masters seasons.

Note: GP = Games played, W = Wins, L = Losses, W–L% = Winning percentage

Season	Conference	GP	W	L	W–L%	Finish	Playoffs
2024–25	Commissioner's	12	3	9	.250	12th	Did not qualify
2024–25	Philippine	11	4	7	.364	9th	Did not qualify
2025–26	Philippine	11	3	8	.273	10th	Did not qualify
2025–26	Commissioner's	12	6	6	.500	7th	Lost in quarterfinals vs. Barangay Ginebra**, 81–112
2025–26	Governors' Cup	10	5	5	.500	4th (Group B)	Lost in quarterfinals vs. NLEX, 0–3
An asterisk (*) indicates one-game playoff; two asterisks (**) indicates team with twice-to-beat advantage

== See also ==
- Phoenix Super LPG Fuel Masters draft history
