= Jason Perkins =

Filipino-American basketball player (born 1992)

No. 3 – Phoenix Super LPG Fuel Masters
- Position: Power forward
- League: PBA

Personal information
- Born: September 20, 1992 (age 34) Shakopee, Minnesota, U.S.
- Listed height: 6 ft 4 in (1.93 m)
- Listed weight: 235 lb (107 kg)

Career information
- High school: Shakopee (Shakopee, Minnesota)
- College: Valley City State (2011); De La Salle (2013–2016)
- PBA draft: 2017: 1st round, 4th overall pick
- Drafted by: Phoenix Fuel Masters
- Playing career: 2017–present
- Number: 3, 21, 0, 30

Career history
- 2017–present: Phoenix Fuel Masters / Phoenix Pulse Fuel Masters / Phoenix Super LPG Fuel Masters

Career highlights
- 2× PBA All-Star (2019, 2024); PBA Second Mythical Team (2024); PBA Rookie of the Year (2018); PBA All-Rookie Team (2018); 2x UAAP champion (2013, 2016); UAAP Mythical Five (2013)
Medals
Men's 3x3 basketball
Representing Philippines
SEA Games
Gold medal – first place	2019 Philippines	Team

Jason Andre Perkins (born September 20, 1992) is a Filipino-American professional basketball player for the Phoenix Super LPG Fuel Masters of the Philippine Basketball Association (PBA).

== Personal life ==
Perkins is the youngest of three siblings. His father is an African-American, while his mother, Jennifer (née Cahigas), is a Filipina, who hails from Bolinao, Pangasinan. Perkins' interest in sports began at a young age and he played basketball and football as a child.

He has a wife and a daughter.

== High school career ==
Perkins attended at Shakopee High School in Shakopee, Minnesota, where he suited up for the Sabers boys basketball team. He also played Tight end (TE) for the school's varsity football program. During his senior year in 2010–11, he averaged 16.6 points and 4.2 rebounds per game, and signed the letter of intent to play for the Valley City State University in April 2011. He also played AAU ball when he was a teenager, suiting up for a squad called Pump N Run, where got his moniker Hefty Lefty.

== College career ==
After graduating from Shakopee in 2011, Perkins attended at Valley City State University to play basketball for the Vikings, but he only played for one year there. In 2012, he decided to come to the Philippines to study upon the proddings of his mother Jennifer, who had always encouraged him to live in her native land.

He was initially recruited by former San Beda head coach Frankie Lim to play for the Red Lions, but left following Lim's resignation. Then he was invited by De La Salle University officials to visit the campus, and soon after, he joined the practice with the Green Archers. He served his one-year residency before finally suiting up for the Green Archers in the 2013 UAAP season. In his rookie season, he averaged 12.7 PPG on 52.8% FGs and 9.6 RPG and was instrumental in La Salle's title conquest. He was also named to the Mythical Five—the only rookie on the list—along with Terrence Romeo, Roi Sumang, Ray Parks and Karim Abdul. The Archers went on to win the championship that season.

In the Archers' first win of Season 77, Perkins hit clutch shots for 14 points against the NU Bulldogs. They went on to have a five-game win streak. After their streak was snapped by the FEU Tamaraws, he bounced back with 16 points and 16 rebounds against the Adamson Falcons. The Archers failed to defend their title that year, as they lost to FEU in the Final Four. They fell just short of a spot in the Final Four the following year.

Perkins returned to La Salle for his final year. He missed the start of Season 79 due to a knee injury. He lost his starting role that year, but the Archers went on to win the championship, sweeping the Ateneo Blue Eagles in the process.

== Amateur career ==
=== PBA D-League ===
Perkins was one of the 215 aspirants for the 2015 PBA D-League draft, which took place on December 1, 2015. On December 1, 2015, he was drafted first overall by the Caida Tiles Masters in the PBA D-League draft held at PBA Café in Metrowalk, Pasig. In the 2016 PBA D-League Aspirants' Cup quarterfinals, he had 17 points to send his team to the semifinals.

=== Cignal-San Beda Hawkeyes ===
Perkins then signed with the Cignal-San Beda Hawkeyes for the 2017 season. He debuted in the Philippine Cup with 10 points, nine rebounds, and two assists in 21 minutes, but struggled with foul trouble as the Fuel Masters went on to lose to the San Miguel Beermen.

He had 14 points on 5-of-5 shooting from the field in a win over the Cafe France-CEU Bakers, then had a double-double of 19 points and 18 rebounds the next game in a win against Wangs Basketball. He had 24 points to clinch the top spot for Cignal. They made it to the Finals against the Racal Tile Masters, where in their Game 1 win, he led the Hawkeyes with 28 points and 8 rebounds. In Game 3, he had 21 points, including a go-ahead three pointer, that gave Cignal the Aspirants' Cup championship.

In the Foundation Cup, Perkins led his team with 18 points (including the game-sealing layup) and 10 rebounds to send them to the semifinals. They made it to the Finals, where they faced off against the CEU Scorpions. The Hawkeyes were able to sweep the Scorpions in two games, giving Cignal its second championship.

== Professional career ==
=== Phoenix Fuel Masters (2017–present) ===
Perkins was selected 4th overall by the Phoenix Fuel Masters during the 2017 PBA draft. He debuted in the Philippine Cup with 10 points, nine rebounds, and two assists in 21 minutes, but struggled with foul trouble as the Fuel Masters went on to lose to the San Miguel Beermen. He helped the team gain its first ever twice-to-beat advantage in the quarterfinals as they finished 2nd at the end of eliminations of the 2018 Governors' Cup with an 8-3 W-L record but they lost to the Meralco Bolts in two straight games. At season's end, he was named Rookie of the Year after averaging 12.1 points. 6.6 rebounds and 1.5 assists and the All-Rookie team.

In the 2019 Philippine Cup, Perkins matched up against his former college teammate Abu Tratter, who was playing for the Blackwater Elite. He only had 15 points that game, but they got the win over the Elite. Against the Magnolia Hotshots, he hit a corner three with 19.1 seconds left and a free throw to seal a comeback win for Phoenix. He later played in the Rookies/Sophomores vs. Juniors game, and was also an All-Star. During the quarterfinals against the Alaska Aces, he set a new career-high of 31 points, leading Phoenix to its first-ever semifinals. In the semifinals, they lost to the Beermen in five games out of a best-of-seven series.

In the 2020 Philippine Cup, he had 30 points and eight rebounds against the Rain or Shine Elastopainters to help the Fuel Masters secure the #2 seed. They edged the Hotshots in the first round, but its finals aspirations fell short as the Fuel Masters lost to the TNT Katropa in the knockout game of the semifinals.

In the 2021 Philippine Cup, he had 28 points to end the Terrafirma Dyip's three-game winning streak. In the 2021 Governors' Cup, he had only 11 points and nine rebounds as the Hotshots ended Phoenix's season.

Before the start of the 2022–23 Commissioner's Cup, Perkins had season-ending injury on his knee. However, he was cleared by doctors to play again nearly two months after surgery.

His contract with the team expired on October 31, 2023. On December 19, Perkins signed a new three-year maximum contract with the team.

== Career statistics ==
Legend
GP	Games played	MPG	Minutes per game	FG%	Field-goal percentage
3FG%	3-point field-goal percentage	4P%	4-point field-goal percentage	FT%	Free-throw percentage
RPG	Rebounds per game	APG	Assists per game	SPG	Steals per game
BPG	Blocks per game	PPG	Points per game	**127**	Career high

As of the end of 2025–26 season

=== PBA ===
Year	Team	GP	MPG	FG%	3P%	4P%	FT%	RPG	APG	SPG	BPG	PPG
2017–18	Phoenix	36	26.2	**.513**	.364	—	.703	6.1	1.4	.3	.3	12.1
2019	Phoenix Pulse	**39**	28.0	.453	.292	—	.798	6.5	1.4	**.8**	.2	10.5
2020	Phoenix Super LPG	17	**37.6**	.509	.395	—	.739	**8.6**	**2.5**	.2	.1	**17.8**
2021	Phoenix Super LPG	25	36.7	.468	**.420**	—	.724	7.7	2.1	.6	**.6**	14.8
2022–23	Phoenix Super LPG	26	32.0	.450	.333	—	.758	5.8	2.2	.7	.2	15.2
2023–24	Phoenix Super LPG / Phoenix	25	34.2	.492	.308	—	.750	7.2	2.1	.5	.2	15.8
2024–25	Phoenix	31	33.7	.500	.320	**.500**	.811	5.4	2.3	.5	.3	17.6
2025–26	Phoenix / Phoenix Super LPG	30	29.4	.503	.352	.000	**.838**	5.0	1.6	.2	.1	15.5
Career		229	31.5	.486	.350	.300	.772	6.5	1.9	.5	.3	14.5

=== College ===
Legend
GP	Games played	MPG	Minutes per game
FG%	Field-goal percentage	3P%	3-point field-goal percentage	FT%	Free-throw percentage
RPG	Rebounds per game	APG	Assists per game	SPG	Steals per game
BPG	Blocks per game	PPG	Points per game	**Bold**	Career high

Year	Team	GP	MPG	FG%	3P%	FT%	RPG	APG	SPG	BPG	PPG
2011–12	VCSU	**27**	-	**.527**	.167	.6	3.2	.4	**.4**	.1	7.0
2013-14	La Salle	19	**28.3**	.506	**.538**	.635	9.8	1.8	.3	**.5**	**12.2**
2014-15	La Salle	17	27.5	.435	.214	.620	**10.2**	**2.1**	.2	.2	10.4
2015-16	La Salle	13	26.9	.337	.222	**.647**	8.6	1.4	.1	.1	7.1

== National team career ==
He was named to the Gilas 3x3 team for the SEA Games, along with Chris Newsome, CJ Perez, and Moala Tautuaa. That team went on to sweep their competition in eight games, winning the gold medal.
