= UAAP Final Four =

Postseasons

The UAAP Final Four refers to the postseasons of the University Athletic Association of the Philippines (UAAP) tournaments. The term "final four" came from the National Collegiate Athletic Association of the United States' men's Division I basketball tournament which is colloquially called as the "final four" in that country. "Final Four" is now a registered trademark exclusive to the American NCAA and no other organizing body within the U.S. can use that name in referring to their tournaments.

== History ==
The Final Four in which the four teams (out of eight) with the best records qualify for the postseason playoff games was instituted in Season 56 (1993–94). Previously the postseason was a championship series between the top two teams, with the No. 1 seeded team holding the twice to beat advantage, i.e., they have to win only once to clinch the championship. The No. 2 team has to win twice.

The tournament is now conducted in three stages with the institution of the Final Four playoffs:

- The two-round preliminaries, where a team plays the other teams twice. The four teams with the worst records are eliminated.
- The semifinals, wherein the No. 1 seeded team plays the 4th seeded team and the No. 2 seeded team plays the 3rd seeded team. Both No. 1 and No. 2 seeded teams possess the twice to beat advantage, while the No. 3 and No. 4 teams have to win twice.
- The finals, which is a best of three series.

On the first year of the implementation of the Final Four playoffs in men's basketball, the University of Santo Tomas swept the elimination round, and following the then existing rules, the Glowing Goldies were awarded the championship outright. After that season, the UAAP revised the rule so that the team that sweeps the regular stage will instead advance to the best-of-3 Finals automatically. While the No. 2 team will have the twice to beat advantage in the semifinals where it awaits the winner of the game between the No. 3 and No. 4 teams.

The revised postseason format was implemented in Season 57 (1994–95) but it was not until Season 70 (2007–08) that a team swept the elimination round. The University of the East was the first to accomplish this feat under the new format, causing the sweep clause to be used. UE thus automatically advanced to the Finals but this reward became a bane as the Red Warriors had to wait for 21 days before the championship series can be started due to several factors, namely, the unavailability of the playing venue (Araneta Coliseum), two tie-breaker games and two semifinal games. The Red Warriors became rusty, so to speak, causing them to lose the championship series 2–0 against La Salle (their last elimination round opponent). As a result, the Policy Board formulated the "bonus rule" in which the team that sweeps the elimination rounds will qualify for the Finals outright and will have a thrice-to-beat advantage. This meant that the number 1 seeded team will only need to win twice; the other finalist needs to win thrice, thus giving the sweeper a 1–0 lead in a virtual best-of-five.

Ties among the semifinalists were broken by an extra game, irrespective of the seedings. Ergo, in a tie for the 2nd seed, the game that will be used to break the tie serves as a de facto game one of a best-of-three series. If two teams are tied for the fourth seed, the game that will be used to break the tie serves as a knockout game between the two. If three or more teams are tied, the team with the best points difference gets a bye to the final tie-breaker game against the winner/s of the teams with the lower points difference. In Season 72 (2009–10), the league introduced the "common sense" rule in determining seedings for the playoffs in case of ties. This means not all ties in the semifinals will be broken by a one-game playoff. Only ties for second and fourth are broken by an extra game. Ties for first and third are broken by the points difference of the tied teams. Starting Season 79, however, the thrice-to-beat advantage for the top-seeded team (in cases of the double elimination round sweep) was removed, but the stepladder semifinals format (second-seeded team still with the twice-to-beat advantage against the two lower-seeded teams in the Final Four) and the automatic Finals slot incentive for the top-seeded team remained.

Starting In Season 85, the UAAP removed the twice-to-beat advantage for the #2 seed in the stepladder series, to remove the "undue advantage."

== Format ==
Current format:

- Regular Final Four Round (1994–present) - If no team sweeps the elimination round:
  - Seeds No. 1 and No. 2 teams possess the twice-to-beat advantage
  - Team No. 1 meets No. 4 while No. 2 meets No. 3 in the semifinals.
  - The semifinal winners advance to the Finals.
  - The team that wins 2 games in the Finals wins the championship.
- Stepladder Final Four Format (2022–present) - If a team sweeps the elimination round:
  - Seed No. 1 advances to the Finals.
  - Seed No. 2 advances to the semifinals.
  - Teams No. 3 and No. 4 face off to meet No. 2 in the semifinals in a one-game playoff.
  - In the finals, either the No. 1 seed or the other opponent has to win only twice to win the championship.
- If two teams are tied, an extra game will be played to determine which seed they will possess.
- In case of three or more teams being tied, the team with the best head-to-head record usually possesses the best seeding, while the other teams will play an extra game to determine the second-best seeding,

Former formats:

- Stepladder Final Four Format (2008–2022):
  - From 2008 to 2016, seed No. 1 (when winning all elimination round games) earned a thrice-to-beat advantage (or a 1−0 incentive lead in a best-of-five Finals series), while seed No. 2 seed a twice-to-beat advantage (or 1-0 incentive lead in a best-of-three semifinals series) over the winner between the No. 3 and No. 4 seeds. The No. 1 seed only had to win twice, while the other opponent had to win thrice, to win the championship.
  - From 2016 to 2022, seed No. 1 (when winning all elimination round games) advances to the best-of-three Finals series, while seed No. 2 has a twice-to-beat advantage (or 1-0 incentive lead in a best-of-three semifinals series) over the winner between seeds No. 3 and No. 4.

== Tournaments ==
The UAAP usually employs this format if there are 7 or 8 competing teams.

- Basketball (men, women, boys, 16U)
- Volleyball (men, women, boys, girls)
- Football (men, boys)
- Beach volleyball (men, women, boys, girls)
- Badminton (men, women)
- Table tennis (men, women)
- Tennis (men, women)
- Baseball (men)

== Television and radio ==
The Final Four is heavily covered by the media. With the UAAP as one of the leading collegiate leagues in the country, the Final Four games are broadcast live throughout the country.

From 2000 to 2020, the UAAP Finals and the Final Four games, were broadcast by ABS-CBN's UHF channel Studio 23 (later S+A from 2014 to 2020) nationwide and produced by ABS-CBN Sports. Prior to Studio 23/S+A, the games were broadcast by Silverstar Sports on the state-controlled People's Television VHF channel 4. Since July 2009, the UAAP is also aired in high definition through cable channel Balls, via their channel Balls HD. Upon signing a new contract at the conclusion of UAAP Season 72 in October 2009, the Finals will be aired through VHF television channel ABS-CBN 2, beginning in 2010 and renewed again in October 2013 at the conclusion of UAAP Season 76. Prior to 2001, the games were also aired live on DZSR Sports Radio 918-AM; after ABS-CBN's takeover of broadcast rights, its Manila FM station 101.9 For Life! aired updates during and after the games, but not blow-by-blow coverages. In 2010, radio coverage of the games were aired on DZRJ-AM 810.

Starting the 2021–22 season, after the COVID-19 pandemic and the closure of ABS-CBN on free television in 2020, the UAAP has signed new broadcast rights with Cignal TV, resulting in the establishment of the UAAP Varsity Channel dedicated to live broadcasts and archived games of the league across selected events. One Sports and TV5 have also signed in to televise the games live nationwide, with the latter catering to all post-season matches for both basketball and volleyball tournaments.

== Statistics (men's basketball) ==
=== Appearances ===
Team	Semifinal appearances	Last semis appearance	First semis appearance	Finals appearances	Highest seed
Adamson	8	2024	2006	-	2nd
Ateneo	23	2023	1999	15	1st
La Salle	24	2025	1994	19	1st
FEU	22	2021	1994	10	1st
NU	8	2025	2001	1	1st
UE	12	2009	1994	2	1st
UP	9	2025	1996	5	1st
UST	18	2025	1994	9	1st

Notes:

- Number of appearance excludes 4th seed elimination games.

=== Season-by-season performances ===
- Champion
- Runners-up
- Semifinalist, lost with twice to beat advantage
- Semifinalist, lost with twice to win disadvantage
- Lost in 4th-seed playoff
- Suspended
- Tournament cancelled
- Did not join
1	elimination round ranking
~~s~~	Game was forfeited.

- Number denotes playoff seeding.
- Shade denotes final position.

School	94	95	96	97	98	99	00	01	02	03	04	05	06	07	08	09	10	11	12	13	14	15	16	17	18	19	20	21^{a}	22	23	24	25
AdU		6	8	7	8	8	8	8	7	5	6	7	4	7	7	5	3	2	6	7	8	8	4	3	2	6		5	4	5	4	7
ADMU	6	7	5	6	6	3	2	2	3	1	3	3	1	3	1	1	2	1	1	5	1	3	2	1	1	1		1	1	4	8	6
DLSU	1	2	1	3	1	1	1	1	1	~~4~~	~~2~~	~~2~~		2	2	6	4	6	4	2	3	5	1	2	5	5		3	5	2	1	4
FEU	4	4	7	1	2	4	3	3	5	2	1	1	5	5	3	2	1	3	5	3	2	2	3	4	4	3		4	7	7	6	5
NU	7	8	6	8	7	7	7	4	8	8	8	8	7	6	8	7	5	5	3	1	4	4	5	6	7	8		6	3	3	7	1
UE	2	3	4	5	3	5	5	5	2	3	4	4	2	1	4	3	6	7	7	6	5	6	7	7	8	7		8	6	6	5	8
UP	5	5	3	4	5	6	6	7	6	7	5	5	6	8	6	8	8	8	8	8	7	7	6	5	3	2		2	2	1	2	2
UST	3	1	2	2	4	2	4	6	4	6	7	6	3	4	5	4	7	4	2	4	6	1	8	8	6	4		7	8	8	3	3

Notes:

a.2021–22 season was played in early 2022.

=== Win–loss statistics ===
==== Entire playoffs ====
Team	Pld	W	L	PCT
La Salle	77	47	30	.610
Ateneo	73	43	30	.589
UST	53	30	23	.566
FEU	61	28	33	.459
UP	21	10	11	.476
NU	14	6	8	.429
UE	26	4	22	.154
Adamson	12	1	11	.083

Updated to match(es) played on UAAP Season 86. Source:

=== Series statistics ===
Team	Pld	W	L	PCT
La Salle	40	26	14	.650
Ateneo	41	26	15	.634
FEU	32	14	18	.438
UST	27	14	13	.519
UP	14	8	6	.571
NU	8	2	6	.250
UE	13	1	12	.077
Adamson	8	0	8	.000

Updated to match(es) played on UAAP Season 87. Source:

==== Finals ====
Team	Pld	W	L	PCT
Ateneo	15	10	5	.667
La Salle	18	8	10	.444
FEU	10	5	5	.500
UST	9	4	5	.444
NU	1	1	0	1.000
UE	2	0	2	.000
UP	5	2	3	.400
Adamson	0	0	0	—

Updated to match(es) played on UAAP Season 87. Source:

=== Finals statistics ===
- Most lopsided game: UP 97–67 La Salle, 2023 Game 1 (30 points)
- Closest game: Several games, all one-point leads:
  - La Salle 76–75 UP, 2024 Game 2
  - UST 73–72 La Salle, 2013 Game 1
  - La Salle 64–63 UE, 2007 Game 1
  - Ateneo 73–72 UST, 2006 Game 1
  - FEU 65–64 La Salle, 1997 Game 2 (championship clincher)
  - UST 77–76 La Salle, 1994 Game 3
- Most number of overtime games: 2
  - UP 81–74 Ateneo, 2021–22 Game 1
  - UP 72–69 Ateneo, 2021–22 Game 3
- Finals appearances: La Salle, 19
- Consecutive finals appearances: La Salle, 9 (1994–2002)
- Championships: Ateneo (2002, 2008–12, 2017–19, 2022), 10; La Salle (1998–2001, 2007, 2013, 2016, 2023, 2025), 9; UST (1993–96, 2006; including UST's 1993 sweep), FEU (1997, 2003–05, 2015), 5

Note: FEU was awarded the 2004 championship title due to La Salle's fielding of ineligible players from 2003 to 2005 thus forfeiting their wins and revoking La Salle's final team standings from those seasons.

- Longest streak of consecutive championships: Ateneo (2008–12), 5.
- As of 2026, the winner of Game 1 won the championship 21 times out of 30 (70%).

=== Semifinals statistics ===
- Most lopsided game: La Salle vs NU, 111–85, 2001 (26 points)
- Closest game: Several games, all one-point wins.
  - UP 70–69 FEU, 1997 Game 1 (1 point)
  - FEU 70–69 UP, 1997 Game 2 (1 point)
  - UST 75–74 Ateneo, 1999 (1 point)
  - FEU 61–60 Ateneo, 2000 Game 1 (1 point)
  - UST 82–81 UE, 2006 Game 2 (1 point)
  - Ateneo 65–64 La Salle, 2007 Game 1 (1 point)
  - FEU 62–61 Ateneo, 2016 Game 1 (1 point)
  - Ateneo 69–68 FEU (OT), 2016 Game 2 (1 point)
- Semifinal appearances: La Salle, (1994–2005, 2007–08, 2010, 2012–14, 2016–17, 2021, 2023–25), 24; Ateneo, (1999–2012, 2014–23), 23; FEU, (1994–95, 1997–2001, 2003–05, 2008–11, 2013–21), 22; UST, (1994-2000, 2002, 2006–07, 2009, 2011–13, 2015, 2019, 2024–25), 18
- Consecutive semifinal appearances: Ateneo (1999–2012), 14

=== Most frequent matchups ===
The most frequently played matchups are:

Matchup	Semifinals	Finals	Total
FEU vs. La Salle	6	5	11
Ateneo vs. FEU	7	3	10
Ateneo vs. La Salle	5	5	10
La Salle vs. UST	4	5	9
Ateneo vs. UST	4	3	7
FEU vs. UE	5	0	5
Ateneo vs. UP	1	3	4
La Salle vs. UP	1	3	4
UP vs. UST	4	0	4
Ateneo vs. UE	2	1	3
La Salle vs. UE	2	1	3
FEU vs. UST	2	1	3
Adamson vs. Ateneo	3	0	3
Adamson vs. La Salle	3	0	3
La Salle vs. NU	3	0	3
NU vs. UST	3	0	3

=== Seeds ===
In the 30 tournaments the Final Four format has been applied, the higher seed has beaten the lower seeds in the semifinals due to their twice to beat advantage, for the most part:

1. The No. 1 seed has beaten the No. 4 seed in 26 out of the 28 times (93%).
  - The No. 1 seed has beaten the No. 4 seed 21 times on the first game (81%).
  - The No. 1 seed has beaten the No. 4 seed 5 times on the second game (19%).
  - The only times the No. 1 seed was beaten by the No. 4 seed were during the NU-UST matchup in 2013 (UST won), and the Ateneo-NU matchup in 2014 (NU won).
2. The No. 2 seed has beaten the No. 3 seed 21 out of 29 times (72%).
  - The No. 2 seed has beaten the No. 3 seed 16 times on the first game (76%).
  - The No. 2 seed has beaten the No. 3 seed 5 times on the second game (24%).
    - Out of the 8 times the No. 2 seed was beaten, the No. 2 seed was UE thrice (38%) and Adamson twice (25%).
3. The No. 4 seed has beaten the No. 2 seed 1 out of 1 time (100%).
  - The only time the No. 2 seed was beaten by the No. 4 seed was during the UST-UP matchup in 2019 (UST won) due to the stepladder format.
4. The No. 3 seed has beaten the No. 4 seed 1 out of 2 times (50%).
  - With UE sweeping the elimination round, there were two semifinal rounds for 2007.
  - With Ateneo sweeping the elimination round, there were two semifinal rounds for 2019.
5. The No. 1 seed skipped the semifinals twice (7%; in 2007, when UE swept the elimination round, and in 2019, when Ateneo swept the elimination round)

A victory of the No. 3 seed in a series is considered a big upset considering that the No. 3 seed has to win twice, not to mention the perceived superiority of the No. 2 seed when compared to the No. 3 seed.

In the finals, the advantage of the No. 1 seed isn't as pronounced since the competing teams have to win the same number of games:

1. The No. 1 seed has beaten the No. 2 seed 11 of 18 times (61%)
2. The No. 1 seed has beaten the No. 3 seed 5 of 8 times (63%)
3. The No. 1 seed has beaten the No. 4 seed 1 of 1 times (100%)
4. The No. 2 seed has beaten the No. 1 seed 7 of 18 times (39%)
5. The No. 2 seed has beaten the No. 4 seed 1 of 2 times (50%)
6. The No. 3 seed has beaten the No. 1 seed 3 of 8 times (38%)
7. The No. 4 seed has beaten the No. 2 seed 1 of 2 times (50%)
8. The No. 1 seed has won the championship 17 of 29 times (59%)

== Individual single-game records ==
Stats since the 2001 season.

Statistic	Name	Total	School	Opponent	Stage
Most points	Thirdy Ravena	38	Ateneo	UP	2018 Finals
Most rebounds	Raymar Jose	23	FEU	Ateneo	2016 Semifinals
Most assists	Renzo Subido	12	UST	UP	2019 Semifinals
Most steals	Elmer Espiritu; Pocholo Villanueva	5	UE; La Salle	Ateneo; UE	2008 Semifinals; 2007 Finals
Most blocks	Angelo Kouame	8	Ateneo	UP	2021-22 Finals

*Game went into overtime.

== Statistics (women's basketball) ==
=== Season-by-season performances ===
School	94	95	96	97	98	99	00	01	02	03	04	05	06	07	08	09	10	11	12	13	14	15	16	17	18	19	20	21	22	23	24	25
AdU				5		4								5	4	4	2	2	2	3	4	6	6	4	5	3	3			6	3	4
ADMU				7		7								3	1	6	6	7	5	4	8	5	4	6	6	6	6			3	4	3
DLSU				2		5									6	5	3	4	4	2	2	2	2	2	7	5	5			5	6	6
FEU				1		1								2	5	1	1	1	1	1	5	4	8	7	4	2	4			7	7	5
NU														7	8	8	7	5	6	5	1	1	1	1	1	1	1			1	1	2
UE				6		6								6	7	7	8	8	8	8	7	7	3	3	2	7	8			8	8	8
UP				4		3								4	2	3	5	6	7	7	6	8	7	8	8	8	7			4	5	7
UST				3		2								1	3	2	4	3	3	6	3	3	5	5	3	4	2			2	2	1

== Statistics (boys' basketball) ==
=== Season-by-season performances ===
==== 19U ====
School	94	95	96	97	98	99	00	01	02	03	04	05	06	07	08	09	10	11	12	13	14	15	16	17	18	19	20	21	22	23	24	25
AdU				4		3							5	4	6	4	6	6	5	7	8	3	5	8	5	4	4			1	4	7
ADMU				2		2							1	1	1	1	3	1	4	4	2	1	3	3	1	2	3			7	7	3
DLSZ				3		4							2		2	2	1	4	2	5	3	4	2	4	6	6	7			6	6	4
FEU–D				8									3	2	3	3	4	5	1	1	4	5	4	2	3	3	2			3	3	2
NUNS				7		7							8	7	4	7	7	3	3	2	1	2	1	1	2	1	1			2	1	1
UE				5		5							7	6	5	6	5	7	7	8	5	8	8	7	8	7	6			5	5	5
UPIS				6		6							4	3	7	8	8	8	8	6	7	7	6	6	7	8	8			8	8	8
UST				1		1							6	5	8	5	2	2	6	3	6	6	7	5	4	5	5			4	2	6

==== 16U ====
School	23	24	25
AdU		7	4
ADMU		6	6
DLSZ		5	8
FEU–D		2	3
NUNS		4	1
UE		1	5
UPIS		8	7
UST		3	2

== Statistics (girls' basketball) ==
=== Season-by-season performances ===
School	20	21	22	23	24	25
AdU	1					
ADMU	4				4	4
DLSZ	3				3	3
FEU–D						
NUNS					2	1
UE						
UPIS						
UST	2				1	2

== See also ==
- NCAA Final Four (Philippines)
