= UAAP Season 82 basketball tournaments =

Basketball season

UAAP Season 82
- "All For More"
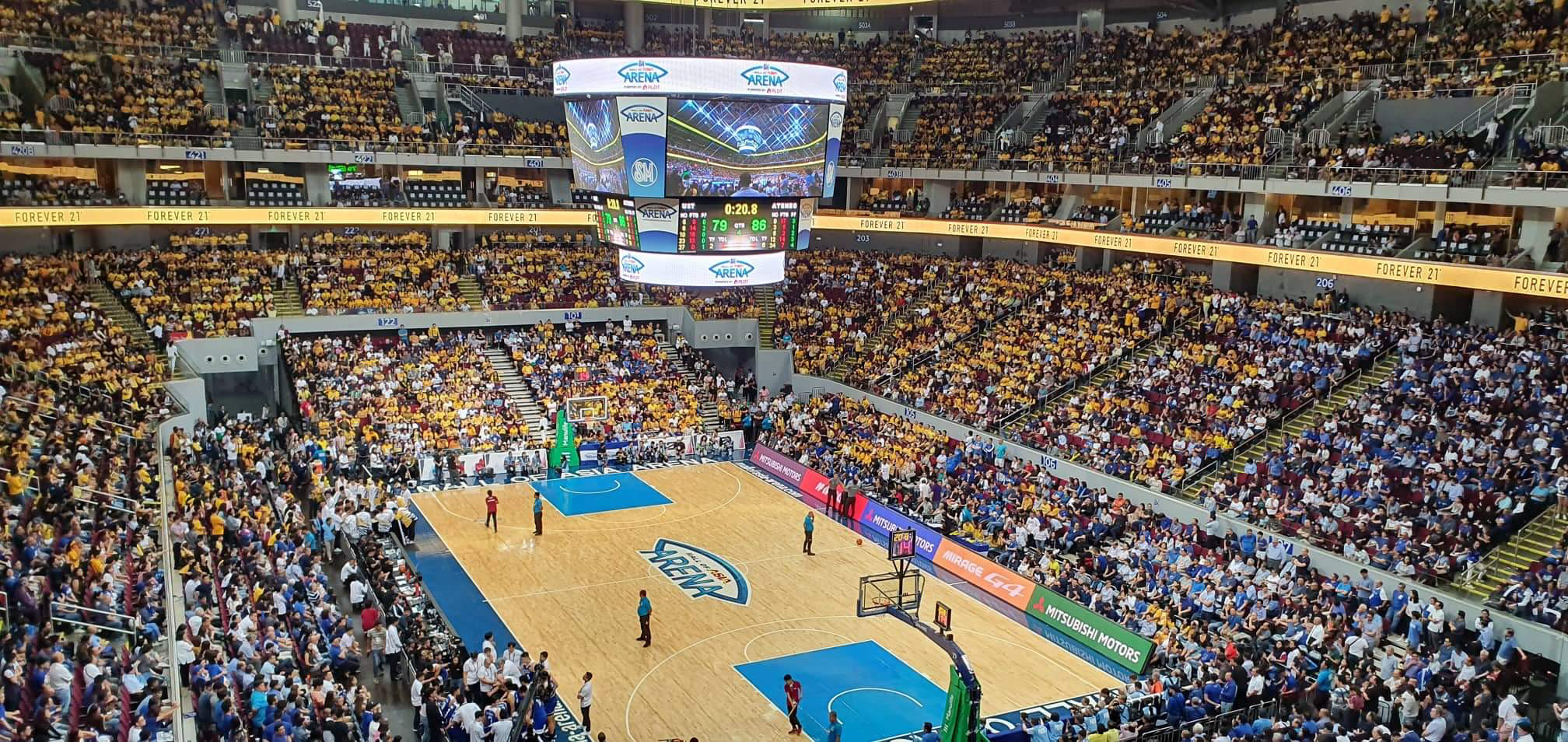
- Game 2 of the men's finals between Ateneo and UST
- Host school: Ateneo de Manila University
Men's Finals	G1	G2	Wins
Ateneo Blue Eagles	91	86	2
UST Growling Tigers	77	79	0
- Duration: November 16 & 20, 2019
- Arena(s): Smart Araneta Coliseum; Mall of Asia Arena
- Finals MVP: Thirdy Ravena
- Winning coach: Tab Baldwin (3rd title)
- Semifinalists: UP Fighting Maroons; FEU Tamaraws
- TV network(s): ABS-CBN Sports and Action; Liga; ABS-CBN iWant
Women's Finals	G1	G2	Wins
NU Lady Bulldogs	70	66	2
UST Growling Tigresses	65	54	0
- Duration: November 20 & 23, 2019
- Arena(s): Mall of Asia Arena
- Finals MVP: Monique Allison del Carmen
- Winning coach: Patrick Aquino (6th title)
- Semifinalists: FEU Lady Tamaraws; Adamson Lady Falcons
- TV network(s): ABS-CBN Sports and Action
Boys' Finals	G1	G2	Wins
NUNS Bullpups	79	87	2
FEU–D Baby Tamaraws	61	80	0
- Duration: March 6 & 9, 2020
- Arena(s): Filoil Flying V Centre
- Finals MVP: Carl Tamayo
- Winning coach: Goldwin Monteverde (2nd title)
- Semifinalists: Adamson Baby Falcons; Ateneo Blue Eaglets
Girls' Finals	G1	G2	G3 (Note: The winner-take-all Game 3 of girls' basketball was cancelled as a result of COVID-19 pandemic. Hence, Adamson and UST have been declared co-champions.)	Wins
Adamson Lady Baby Falcons	68	79	—	1
UST Junior Tigresses	73	74	—	1
- Duration: March 6 & 9, 2020
- Arena(s): Filoil Flying V Centre
- Winning coach: Ewon Arayi (Adamson) (1st title) and Aileen Grajales (UST) (1st title)

The UAAP Season 82 basketball tournaments were the University Athletic Association of the Philippines (UAAP) basketball tournaments for the 2019–20 school year.

Jensen Ilagan, the technical director of the regional ASEAN Basketball League was appointed commissioner for the season's basketball tournaments on August 6, 2019.

The senior men's and women's tournaments began on September 4, 2019, while the juniors' division which was sub-hosted by National University held their opening games on November 13 for the boys' tournament and on January 11, 2020, for the newly formed girls' competition.

The men's defending champions Ateneo Blue Eagles won all 14 elimination round games to become the only second men's basketball team to advance to the UAAP Finals outright (after UE in 2007). The remaining Final Four teams figured in the stepladder format to determine Ateneo's finals opponent. UST defeated FEU in the first round to meet UP in the second round, who are holding their first twice-to-beat advantage in the Final Four era. The Growling Tigers defeated the Fighting Maroons twice to deny UP's finals rematch against Ateneo and tie with 2014 champions NU Bulldogs as the lowest-seeded basketball team in UAAP history to have competed in the championship round - and the first overall ever to do so in a stepladder post-season format.

In the first #1 vs #4 UAAP Finals match-up in any of the league's events, the Blue Eagles swept the finals for a second consecutive year, being crowned undefeated champions (and the first men's basketball team in UAAP history to pose a 16–0 season win sweep record). Graduating player Thirdy Ravena became the first athlete in UAAP history to win three consecutive Finals MVP awards.

The women's defending champions NU Lady Bulldogs also won all elimination round games. In the stepladder, FEU outlasted Adamson in the first round, to meet #2 seeded UST in the next round. UST needed its twice-to-beat advantage to eliminate the Lady Tamaraws from contention. The Tigresses fell short against the NU Lady Bulldogs, who were without their best player Jack Animam, who was injured. The Lady Bulldogs won their sixth consecutive title, all undefeated seasons.

The juniors' division introduced a girls' tournament, a demonstration sport. The boys' defending champions, the NSNU Bullpups, finished the elimination round undefeated. Last year's finalist, the Ateneo Blue Eaglets, were defeated by the Adamson Baby Falcons in the first round of the stepladder. FEU arranged a Finals match-up with the Bullpups after beating the Baby Falcons in the second round. The Bullpups finished the season undefeated though, winning both Finals games.

The inaugural girls' tournament featured four teams, with the top 2 teams qualifying for the Finals. The Adamson Lady Baby Falcons finished the elimination round undefeated, while the UST Junior Tigresses fended off the DLSZ Lady Junior Archers in their last elimination round game to qualify for the Finals. The two teams split the first two Finals games, with the second game held behind closed doors due to the COVID-19 pandemic. The UAAP then canceled the tournament, declaring both teams co-champions.

== Teams ==
All eight member universities of the UAAP fielded teams in all two divisions. Only four high schools fielded in teams for the inaugural girls' basketball tournament.

University	Men's team	Women's team	High school	Boys' team	Girls' team
Adamson University (AdU)	Soaring Falcons	Lady Falcons	Adamson University (AdU)	Baby Falcons	Lady Baby Falcons
Ateneo de Manila University (AdMU)	Blue Eagles	Lady Eagles	Ateneo de Manila University (AdMU)	Blue Eaglets	Lady Eaglets
De La Salle University (DLSU)	Green Archers	Lady Archers	De La Salle Santiago Zobel School (DLSZ)	Junior Archers	Lady Junior Archers
Far Eastern University (FEU)	Tamaraws	Lady Tamaraws	Far Eastern University Diliman (FEU-D)	Baby Tamaraws	No team
National University (NU)	Bulldogs	Lady Bulldogs	Nazareth School (NSNU)	Bullpups	No team
University of the East (UE)	Red Warriors	Lady Warriors	University of the East (UE)	Junior Warriors	No team
University of the Philippines Diliman (UP)	Fighting Maroons	Fighting Maroons	University of the Philippines Integrated School (UPIS)	Junior Maroons	No team
University of Santo Tomas (UST)	Growling Tigers	Tigresses	University of Santo Tomas (UST)	Tiger Cubs	Tigress Cubs

=== Coaches ===
The UE Red Warriors' Lawrence Chongson and the De La Salle Green Archers' Jermaine Byrd were both recognized by the UAAP as active consultants of their respective teams. Gian Nazario who had been listed by La Salle as their coach clarified that the school is yet to make an announcement regarding Byrd's official appointment. Bong Tan, who had replaced Joe Silva as coach explained the unique setup in their team. With Chongson as consultant, he is able to trust him and take a backseat during games.

Tan died on November 11, 2019. It was reported that he had collapsed while playing in a basketball game in Mandaluyong.

University	Men's coach	Women's coach	High school	Boys' coach	Girls' coach
Adamson University (AdU)	(Philippines) Franz Pumaren	(Philippines) Ewon Arayi	Adamson University	(Philippines) Mike Fermin	(Philippines) Ewon Arayi
Ateneo de Manila University (AdMU)	(United States) Tab Baldwin	(Philippines) Katrina Quimpo	Ateneo de Manila University	(Philippines) Reggie Varilla	(Philippines) Ron Camara
De La Salle University (DLSU)	(Philippines) Gian Nazario	(Philippines) Pocholo Villanueva	De La Salle Santiago Zobel School (DLSZ)	(Philippines) Boris Aldeguer	(Philippines) Ginny Velarde
Far Eastern University (FEU)	(Philippines) Olsen Racela	(Philippines) Bert Flores	Far Eastern University Diliman (FEU-D)	(Philippines) Michael Oliver	No team
National University (NU)	(Philippines) Jamike Jarin	(Philippines) Patrick Aquino	Nazareth School of National University (NSNU)	(Philippines) Goldwin Monteverde	No team
University of the East (UE)	(Philippines) Bong Tan	(Philippines) Aileen Lebornio	University of the East	(Philippines) Estong Ballesteros	No team
University of the Philippines Diliman (UP)	(Philippines) Bo Perasol	(Philippines) Paul Ramos	University of the Philippines Integrated School (UPIS)	(Philippines) Paolo Mendoza	No team
University of Santo Tomas (UST)	(Philippines) Aldin Ayo	(Philippines) Haydee Ong	University of Santo Tomas	(Philippines) Bonnie Garcia	(Philippines) Aileen Grajales

==== Coaching changes ====
Team	Outgoing coach	Manner of departure	Date	Replaced by	Date
De La Salle Green Archers	(Philippines) Louie Gonzales	Fired	December 14, 2018	(Philippines) Gian Nazario	May 5, 2019
UE Junior Warriors	(Philippines) Florence Conlu	Resigned	May 23, 2019	(Philippines) Anton Brodett	May 23, 2019
Ateneo Lady Eagles	(Philippines) Anthony John Flores	Fired	January 23, 2019	(Philippines) Katrina Quimpo	May 26, 2019
UP Lady Maroons	(Philippines) Kenneth Marius Raval			(Philippines) Paul John Ramos	
UE Red Warriors	(Philippines) Joe Silva	Resigned	September 3, 2019	(Philippines) Bong Tan	September 3, 2019
UE Junior Warriors	(Philippines) Anton Brodett	Resigned	October 16, 2019	(Philippines) Estong Ballesteros	October 21, 2019

== Venues ==
The Mall of Asia Arena in Pasay and the Smart Araneta Coliseum in Quezon City are the primary venues for the men's tournament, and the venues for the Finals series for the women's tournament. The Ynares Center in Antipolo is an alternative venue for the men's tournament. The Quadricentennial Pavilion in UST Manila and the Blue Eagle Gym in Quezon City are the alternate and main venue for the women's and boys' tournaments, respectively.

The girls tournament is held at the Paco Arena in Manila.

== Men's tournament ==
=== Elimination round ===
==== Team standings ====
Pos	Team	W	L	PCT	GB	Qualification
1	Ateneo Blue Eagles (H)	14	0	1.000	—	Advance to the Finals (Note: As Ateneo won all of their elimination round games, the stepladder format was used instead of the regular Final Four format.)
2	UP Fighting Maroons	9	5	.643	5	Twice-to-beat in stepladder round 2
3	FEU Tamaraws	8	6	.571 (Note: Head-to-head record: FEU 1–1 UST (FEU +6))	6	Proceed to stepladder round 1
4	UST Growling Tigers	8	6	.571	6	Proceed to stepladder round 1
5	De La Salle Green Archers	7	7	.500	7	
6	Adamson Soaring Falcons	4	10	.286 (Note: Head-to-head record: Adamson 1–1 UE (Adamson +5))	10	
7	UE Red Warriors	4	10	.286	10	
8	NU Bulldogs	2	12	.143	12	

Source: ABS-CBN Sports
Rules for classification: 1) winning percentage; 2) if tied for #2 or #4, one-game playoff; 3) head-to-head record; 4) head-to-head point differential; 5) overall point differential
(H) Hosts

==== Match-up results ====
	Round 1							Round 2						
Team ╲ Game	1	2	3	4	5	6	7	8	9	10	11	12	13	14
Adamson	Ateneo school colors	NU school colors	UE school colors	UP school colors	UST school colors	La Salle school colors	FEU school colors	UE school colors	Ateneo school colors	NU school colors	UP school colors	FEU school colors	UST school colors	La Salle school colors
Ateneo	Adamson school colors	La Salle school colors	UST school colors	FEU school colors	NU school colors	UE school colors	UP school colors	UST school colors	Adamson school colors	La Salle school colors	FEU school colors	UE school colors	NU school colors	UP school colors
La Salle	Ateneo school colors	NU school colors	UE school colors	FEU school colors	Adamson school colors	UP school colors	UST school colors	NU school colors	Ateneo school colors	UE school colors	FEU school colors	UST school colors	UP school colors	Adamson school colors
FEU	UP school colors	UE school colors	Ateneo school colors	La Salle school colors	UST school colors	NU school colors	Adamson school colors	UP school colors	NU school colors	UST school colors	Ateneo school colors	La Salle school colors	Adamson school colors	UE school colors
NU	Adamson school colors	La Salle school colors	UST school colors	UP school colors	Ateneo school colors	FEU school colors	UE school colors	La Salle school colors	FEU school colors	Adamson school colors	UST school colors	UP school colors	Ateneo school colors	UE school colors
UE	UST school colors	FEU school colors	Adamson school colors	La Salle school colors	UP school colors	Ateneo school colors	NU school colors	Adamson school colors	UST school colors	UP school colors	La Salle school colors	Ateneo school colors	FEU school colors	NU school colors
UP	FEU school colors	UST school colors	Adamson school colors	NU school colors	UE school colors	La Salle school colors	Ateneo school colors	FEU school colors	UE school colors	UST school colors	Adamson school colors	NU school colors	La Salle school colors	Ateneo school colors
UST	UE school colors	UP school colors	Ateneo school colors	NU school colors	Adamson school colors	FEU school colors	La Salle school colors	Ateneo school colors	UE school colors	FEU school colors	UP school colors	NU school colors	La Salle school colors	Adamson school colors

= Win; = OT win; = Loss; = OT loss

==== Scores ====
Results on top and to the right of the dashes are for first-round games; those to the bottom and to the left of it are second-round games.

Teams	AdU	ADMU	DLSU	FEU	NU	UE	UP	UST
Adamson Soaring Falcons	—	52–70	61–68	71–83	84–83*	91–80	82–83*	78–71
Ateneo Blue Eagles	80–74	—	81–69	63–46	71–50	85–68	89–63	71–70
De La Salle Green Archers	89–63	69–77	—	55–66	83–82	88–89	71–72	92–77
FEU Tamaraws	63–60	55–65	81–60	—	39–61	81–65	55–61	74–82
NU Bulldogs	53–72	51–88	61–85	85–79*	—	72–78	79–80	74–87*
UE Red Warriors	80–74	50–84	59–65	58–82	79–77	—	56–62	82–95
UP Fighting Maroons	81–77	64–86	71–68	79–82*	80–77	78–75	—	69–85
UST Growling Tigers	80–74	52–66	79–80	58–72	88–76	101–73	84–78	—

Source: ABS-CBN Sports
Legend: Blue = left column team win; Red = top row team win.
Matches with lighter background shading were decided after overtime.

=== Bracket ===
Stepladder round 1 (Single-elimination)
3	FEU	71
4	UST	81

Stepladder round 2 (No. 2 twice-to-beat)
2	UP	69	65
4	UST	89	68

Finals (Best-of-three playoff)
1	Ateneo	91	86
4	UST	77	79

=== Stepladder semifinals ===
==== (3) FEU vs. (4) UST ====
This is a single-elimination game. FEU sustains the current longest playoffs streak, appearing in all playoffs since 2013. For UST, this is their first playoffs appearance since their 2015 runner-up finish.

S+A

November 6
4:00 p.m.PHT

Stats

FEU Tamaraws	71–81	UST Growling Tigers
Scoring by quarter: 16–26, 12–28, 28–16, 15–11
Pts: Ken Tuffin 20; Rebs: Patrick Tchuente 11; Asts: Ljay Gonzales 9		Pts: Soulémane Chabi Yo 25; Rebs: Soulémane Chabi Yo 11; Asts: Mark Nonoy 7
UST advances to the stepladder round 2

Smart Araneta Coliseum, Quezon City
Referees: Nestor Sambrano, Mollie de Luna, Aaron Cañete

UST led by 26 at halftime. Ken Tuffin led an FEU scoring run in the third quarter that cut the lead to 10. Rhenz Abando and Renzo Subido scored back-to-back three-pointers to end the third quarter with UST up by 14. FEU then again had 9–0 run to cut the lead to five, but Subido and Soulemane Chabi Yo scored eight points together to put the Tigers up for good. Tuffin and Xyrus Torres cut the lead 78–71 but that was the closest the Tamaraws can get.

==== (2) UP vs. (4) UST ====
The UP Fighting Maroons have a twice-to-beat advantage. This is UP's second consecutive playoffs appearance, and the first time they have the twice-to-beat advantage.

S+A

November 10
4:00 p.m.PHT

Stats

UP Fighting Maroons	69–89	UST Growling Tigers
Scoring by quarter: 13–19, 11–22, 23–19, 22–29
Pts: Juan Gómez de Liaño 20; Rebs: Bright Akhuetie 18; Asts: Ricci Rivero 5		Pts: Abando, Chabi Yo 17, each Rebs: Soulémane Chabi Yo 15; Asts: Renzo Subido 12

Smart Araneta Coliseum, Quezon City
Attendance: 17,722
Referees: Ricor Buaron, Julius Medillo, John Lester Celeste

S+A

November 13
4:00 p.m.PHT

Stats

UP Fighting Maroons	65–68	UST Growling Tigers
Scoring by quarter: 6–18, 22–11, 16–20, 21–19
Pts: Bright Akhuetie 16; Rebs: Bright Akhuetie 17; Asts: Bright Akhuetie 4		Pts: Soulémane Chabi Yo 22; Rebs: Soulémane Chabi Yo 16; Asts: Mark Nonoy 6
UST wins series in two games

Mall of Asia Arena, Pasay
Attendance: 18,548
Referees: Edgar Orpilla, Mollie de Luna, Aaron Cañete

UST, which has never lost to UP this season, led 19–13 in the first quarter, with Renzo Subido and Rhenz Abando converting multiple three-pointers. Abando and CJ Cansino scored for the Tigers in the second quarter, to extend the lead to 18. Trailing at halftime 41–24, Juan Gomez de Liaño scored seven consecutive points to cut the lead to 12, but he injured his ankle, and the Tigers had another run to lead 52–33. Bright Akhuetie and the return of Gomez de Liaño cut the deficit to 11, but UST closed out the quarter scoring on each of its possessions to lead 60–47. UP cut the lead again to 11, but Sherwin Concepcion and Mark Nonoy made back-to-back three pointers to put UST up for good, extending the series to a deciding Game 2.

UST started the deciding Game 2 the same way Game 1 started, making a double-digit lead, and limiting UP to just 6 points after the first quarter. The Fighting Maroons outscored the Tigers in the second quarter though to cut the lead to one point at halftime. In the fourth quarter, UP led for the first time in the series, off a Gomez de Liaño jump-shot, and extended the lead further off a Jun Manzo lay-up. Akhuetie then suffered from cramps, that led to Manzo fouling a UST player to stop the clock; it was his fifth and he was disqualified from the game. UP led by four just after the two-minute warning off a Kobe Paras slam dunk, but Abando scored on a fast-break to cut the lead to a single possession. Ricci Rivero missed on a lay-up for UP, Renzo Subido made a three-pointer to give UST the lead for good, and the Tigers advance to the Finals.

=== Finals ===
This is a best-of-three playoff. This is Ateneo's fourth consecutive Finals appearance, and their first after winning all elimination round games. This is UST's first Finals appearance since their 2015 runner-up finish vs. FEU.

ABS-CBN
S+A

November 16
4:00 p.m.PHT

Stats

Ateneo Blue Eagles	91–77	UST Growling Tigers
Scoring by quarter: 32–17, 22–22, 22–19, 15–19
Pts: Thirdy Ravena 32; Rebs: Angelo Kouame 12; Asts: Matt Nieto 6		Pts: Mark Nonoy 26; Rebs: CJ Cansino 13; Asts: CJ Cansino 6

Smart Araneta Coliseum, Quezon City
Attendance: 19,176
Referees: Michael Tolentino, Mollie de Luna, Julius Medillo

S+A

November 20
4:00 p.m.PHT

Stats

Ateneo Blue Eagles	86–79	UST Growling Tigers
Scoring by quarter: 31–18, 11–14, 25–30, 19–17
Pts: Thirdy Ravena 17; Rebs: Angelo Kouame 8 Asts: Ravena, Ma. Nieto 5 each		Pts: Rhenz Abando 16; Rebs: Soulémane Chabi Yo 19; Asts: Nonoy, Subido 5 each
Ateneo wins series, 2–0

Mall of Asia Arena, Pasay
Attendance: 20,198
Referees: Ricor Buaron, Jaime Rivano, Aaron Cañete

- Finals Most Valuable Player: Thirdy Ravena (Ateneo Blue Eagles)

Ateneo started Game 1 on an 18–2 run and never looked back to take a wire-to-wire victory. A UST scoring run led by Mark Nonoy cut the lead to two in the second quarter, but that's the closest the Tigers could get as Ateneo had its own 13–1 to end the first half. Ateneo increased its lead to 23 in the third quarter, and Nonoy's back-to-back three-pointers in the fourth period were canceled out by Angelo Kouame and Matt Nieto's baskets. Thirdy Ravena scored a season-high 32 points, Kouame had 18 points and 12 rebounds, and SJ Belangel scored 12 for Ateneo, who shot 52.05% from the field as a team.

=== Awards ===
UAAP Season 82 men's basketball champions
Ateneo Blue Eagles
11th title, third consecutive title

- Most Valuable Player: Soulémane Chabi Yo (UST Growling Tigers)
- Rookie of the Year: Mark Nonoy (UST Growling Tigers)
- Mythical Team:
  - Soulémane Chabi Yo (UST Growling Tigers)
  - Justine Baltazar (De La Salle Green Archers)
  - Jamie Malonzo (De La Salle Green Archers)
  - Kobe Paras (UP Fighting Maroons)
  - Rey Suerte (UE Red Warriors)
- PSBankable Player of the Season: Thirdy Ravena (Ateneo Blue Eagles)
- AXA Know You Can Player of the Season: William Navarro (Ateneo Blue Eagles)

==== Players of the Week ====
Week ending	Player	Team	Ref.
September 8	(Philippines) Rhenz Abando	UST Growling Tigers	
September 15	(Philippines) Rey Suerte	UE Red Warriors	
September 22	(Philippines) Kobe Paras	UP Fighting Maroons	
September 29	(Ivory Coast) Ange Kouame	Ateneo Blue Eagles	
October 6	(Philippines) Justine Baltazar	De La Salle Green Archers	
October 20	(Philippines) CJ Cansino	UST Growling Tigers	
October 27	(Philippines) Jun Manzo	UP Fighting Maroons	
November 3	(Philippines) SJ Belangel	Ateneo Blue Eagles	

=== Statistics ===
==== Players' statistical points ====
#	Player	Team	Total
1	(Benin) Soulémane Chabi Yo	UST Growling Tigers	76.00
2	(Ivory Coast) Ange Kouame	Ateneo Blue Eagles	72.93
3	(Senegal) Adama Diakhite	UE Red Warriors	70.54
4	(Nigeria) Bright Akhuetie	UP Fighting Maroons	67.21
5	(Philippines) Justine Baltazar	De La Salle Green Archers	64.00

==== Season player highs ====
Statistic	Player	Team	Average
Points	(Senegal) Alex Diakhite	UE Red Warriors	17.62
Rebounds	(Benin) Soulémane Chabi Yo	UST Growling Tigers	14.71
Assists	(Philippines) Jun Manzo	UP Fighting Maroons	4.29
Steals	(Nigeria) Bright Akhuetie	UP Fighting Maroons	1.57
Blocks	(Ivory Coast) Ange Kouame	Ateneo Blue Eagles	3.86

==== Game player highs ====
Statistic	Player	Team	Total	Opponent
Points	(Philippines) Jamie Malonzo	De La Salle Green Archers	34	Adamson Soaring Falcons
Rebounds	(Philippines) Justine Baltazar	De La Salle Green Archers	25	NU Bulldogs
Assists	(Philippines) Jerom Lastimosa	Adamson Soaring Falcons	9	NU Bulldogs
Steals	(Philippines) Kobe Paras	UP Fighting Maroons	6	FEU Tamaraws
Blocks	(Ivory Coast) Ange Kouame	Ateneo Blue Eagles	7	NU Bulldogs; UP Fighting Maroons

==== Game team highs ====
Statistic	Team	Total	Opponent
Points	UST Growling Tigers	101	UE Red Warriors
Rebounds	De La Salle Green Archers	66	NU Bulldogs
Assists	Ateneo Blue Eagles	26	NU Bulldogs
Steals	UP Fighting Maroons	13	FEU Tamaraws
Blocks	Ateneo Blue Eagles	11	UE Red Warriors

==== Season team highs ====
Statistic	Team	Average
Points	UST Growling Tigers	79.21
Rebounds	De La Salle Green Archers	51.29
Assists	Ateneo Blue Eagles	16.93
Steals	UP Fighting Maroons	7.07
Blocks	Ateneo Blue Eagles	7.14

=== Broadcasting ===
ABS-CBN Sports is the broadcaster of the UAAP Season 82 Men's Basketball games aired on S+A and Liga. However, their contract with the network's sports division expired due to the issue of legislative franchise renewal and the denial of the franchise, which led to the sports division's dissolution following their retrenchment on August 31, 2020. As of October 21, 2020, the league chose Cignal TV/One Sports as a new partner to air the UAAP games the following season.

Game	Play-by-play	Analyst	Courtside Reporters
Semis R1	Nikko Ramos	Mikee Reyes	Makyla Chavez and Mariz Domingo
Semis R2, Game 1	Mico Halili	Marco Benitez	Makyla Chavez and Yani Mayo
Semis R2, Game 2	Boom Gonzalez	Christian Luanzon	Makyla Chavez and Yani Mayo
Finals, Game 1	Mico Halili	Ronnie Magsanoc	Frannie Reyes and Makyla Chavez
Finals, Game 2	Nikko Ramos	Christian Luanzon	Frannie Reyes and Makyla Chavez

== Women's tournament ==
The NU Lady Bulldogs won their 96th straight match when they annexed their sixth straight championship on November 23, 2019.

The UST Growling Tigresses ended a 13-year finals drought when they defeated the FEU Lady Tamaraws in the second round of the stepladder semifinals on November 16. UST has been eliminated in the semifinals for two years in Seasons 80 and 81, and were defeated in the fourth-seed playoff the previous year. The Tigresses last qualified for the finals in Season 69, under coach Peque Tan and league MVP Marichu Bacaro, when coach Haydee Ong was still handling Ateneo.

The UP Lady Maroons ended their 38-game losing streak when they defeated University of the East in the second round of eliminations on October 12, 2019. Graduating player Pat Pesquera's three-point attempt from the halfcourt line went in before the buzzer sounded for a 55–52 lead, effectively avoiding an overtime period.

=== Elimination round ===
==== Team standings ====
Pos	Team	W	L	PCT	GB	Qualification
1	NU Lady Bulldogs	14	0	1.000	—	Advance to the Finals (Note: As NU won all of their elimination round games, the stepladder format was used instead of the regular Final Four format.)
2	UST Growling Tigresses	11	3	.786	3	Twice-to-beat in stepladder round 2
3	Adamson Lady Falcons	9	5	.643	5	Proceed to stepladder round 1
4	FEU Lady Tamaraws	8	6	.571	6	Proceed to stepladder round 1
5	De La Salle Lady Archers	7	7	.500	7	
6	Ateneo Lady Eagles (H)	5	9	.357	9	
7	UP Fighting Maroons	1	13	.071 (Note: Head-to-head record: UP 1–1 UE (UP +1))	13	
8	UE Lady Warriors	1	13	.071	13	

Source: ABS-CBN Sports
Rules for classification: 1) winning percentage; 2) if tied for #2 or #4, one-game playoff; 3) head-to-head record; 4) head-to-head point differential; 5) overall point differential
(H) Hosts

==== Match-up results ====
	Round 1							Round 2						
Team ╲ Game	1	2	3	4	5	6	7	8	9	10	11	12	13	14
Adamson	NU school colors	UE school colors	UP school colors	UST school colors	La Salle school colors	Ateneo school colors	FEU school colors	UE school colors	Ateneo school colors	NU school colors	UP school colors	FEU school colors	UST school colors	La Salle school colors
Ateneo	UE school colors	La Salle school colors	UST school colors	FEU school colors	NU school colors	Adamson school colors	UP school colors	UST school colors	Adamson school colors	La Salle school colors	FEU school colors	UE school colors	NU school colors	UP school colors
La Salle	UP school colors	Ateneo school colors	NU school colors	UE school colors	FEU school colors	Adamson school colors	UST school colors	NU school colors	Ateneo school colors	UE school colors	FEU school colors	UST school colors	UP school colors	Adamson school colors
FEU	NU school colors	UE school colors	Ateneo school colors	La Salle school colors	UST school colors	UP school colors	Adamson school colors	UP school colors	NU school colors	UST school colors	Ateneo school colors	La Salle school colors	Adamson school colors	UE school colors
NU	FEU school colors	Adamson school colors	La Salle school colors	UST school colors	UP school colors	Ateneo school colors	UE school colors	La Salle school colors	FEU school colors	Adamson school colors	UST school colors	UP school colors	Ateneo school colors	UE school colors
UE	Ateneo school colors	FEU school colors	Adamson school colors	La Salle school colors	UP school colors	UST school colors	NU school colors	Adamson school colors	UST school colors	UP school colors	La Salle school colors	Ateneo school colors	FEU school colors	NU school colors
UP	La Salle school colors	UST school colors	Adamson school colors	NU school colors	UE school colors	FEU school colors	Ateneo school colors	FEU school colors	UE school colors	UST school colors	Adamson school colors	NU school colors	La Salle school colors	Ateneo school colors
UST	UP school colors	Ateneo school colors	NU school colors	Adamson school colors	FEU school colors	UE school colors	La Salle school colors	Ateneo school colors	UE school colors	FEU school colors	UP school colors	NU school colors	La Salle school colors	Adamson school colors

= Win; = OT win; = Loss; = OT loss

==== Scores ====
Results on top and to the right of the dashes are for first-round games; those to the bottom and to the left of it are second-round games.

Teams	AdU	ADMU	DLSU	FEU	NU	UE	UP	UST
Adamson Lady Falcons	—	68–58	46–63	67–73	78–99	82–57	100–74	88–86
Ateneo Lady Eagles	60–65	—	92–90	64–79	51–78	74–65	76–62	73–91
La Salle Lady Archers	86–87	62–53	—	66–67	58–112	91–58	78–47	47–76
FEU Lady Tamaraws	59–61	71–66	47–63	—	60–80	70–59	73–67	55–56
NU Lady Bulldogs	75–56	76–59	98–44	75–62	—	109–54	105–53	90–48
UE Lady Warriors	56–66	70–81*	57–64	41–64	62–80	—	68–66	49–58
UP Fighting Maroons	50–83	46–62	49–73	46–76	33–109	55–52	—	48–103
UST Tigresses	57–53	68–66	71–49	71–67	70–74	65–26	72–40	—

Source: ABS-CBN Sports
Legend: Blue = left column team win; Red = top row team win.
Matches with lighter background shading were decided after overtime.

=== Bracket ===
Stepladder round 1 (Single-elimination)
3	Adamson	73
4	FEU	79

Stepladder round 2 (No. 2 twice-to-beat)
2	UST	46	76
4	FEU	48	65

Finals (Best-of-three playoff)
1	NU	70	66
2	UST	65	54

=== Stepladder semifinals ===
==== (3) Adamson vs. (4) FEU ====
This is a single-elimination game.

S+A

November 10
12:00 p.m.PHT

Boxscore

Adamson Lady Falcons	73–79	FEU Lady Tamaraws
Scoring by quarter: 12–21, 17–19, 22–17, 22–22
Pts: Nat Prado 34; Rebs: Nat Prado 10; Asts: Mamaril, Quiapo, 6 each		Pts: Val Mamaril 22; Rebs: Clare Castro 17; Asts: Kat Araja 6
FEU advances to the stepladder round 2

Smart Araneta Coliseum, Quezon City
Referees: Edgar Orpilla, Jaime Rivano, Jesus Borras

==== (2) UST vs. (4) FEU ====
The UST Growling Tigresses have a twice-to-beat advantage.

S+A

November 13
12:00 p.m.PHT

Boxscore

UST Growling Tigresses	46–48	FEU Lady Tamaraws
Scoring by quarter: 19–15, 11–11, 9–9, 7–13
Pts: Ruby Portillo 12; Rebs: Grace Irebu 12; Asts: Ruby Portillo 5		Pts: Fatima Quiapo 18; Rebs: Clare Castro 15; Asts: Choy Bahuyan 2

Mall of Asia Arena, Pasay

S+A

November 16
12:00 p.m.PHT

Boxscore

UST Growling Tigresses	76–65	FEU Lady Tamaraws
Scoring by quarter: 14–11, 29–10, 16–24, 17–20
Pts: Grace Irebu 28; Rebs: Grace Irebu 14; Asts: Shen Callangan 6		Pts: Valerie Mamaril 23; Rebs: Princess Jumuad 11; Asts: Fatima Quiapo 5
UST wins series in two games

Smart Araneta Coliseum, Quezon City

=== Finals ===
This is a best-of-three playoff.

S+A

November 20
12:00 p.m.PHT

Boxscore

NU Lady Bulldogs	70–65	UST Growling Tigresses
Scoring by quarter: 21–22, 20–16, 16–15, 13–12
Pts: Rhena Itesi 17; Rebs: Rhena Itesi 13; Asts: Monique del Carmen 6		Pts: Grace Irebu 17; Rebs: Grace Irebu 18; Asts: 3 players, 3

Mall of Asia Arena, Pasay

S+A

November 23
12:00 p.m.PHT

Boxscore

NU Lady Bulldogs	66–54	UST Growling Tigresses
Scoring by quarter: 25–8, 11–15, 10–13, 20–18
Pts: Del Carmen, Pingol 15 each Rebs: Mikka Cache 10; Asts: Monique del Carmen 4		Pts: Reynalyn Ferrer 16; Rebs: Grace Irebu 10; Asts: Ruby Portillo 3
NU wins series, 2–0

Mall of Asia Arena, Pasay

- Finals Most Valuable Player: Monique Allison del Carmen (NU Lady Bulldogs)

=== Awards ===
UAAP Season 82 women's basketball champions
NU Lady Bulldogs
Sixth title, sixth consecutive title

- Most Valuable Player: Grace Irebu (UST Growling Tigresses)
- Rookie of the Year: Kent Pastrana (De La Salle Lady Archers)
- Mythical Team:
  - Grace Irebu (UST Growling Tigresses)
  - Nathalia Prado (Adamson Lady Falcons)
  - Jack Animam (NU Lady Bulldogs)
  - Clare Castro (FEU Lady Tamaraws)
  - Kent Pastrana (De La Salle Lady Archers)

==== Players of the Week ====
Week ending	Player	Team	Ref.
October 13	Pat Pesquera	UP Fighting Maroons	
October 20	Mar Prado	Adamson Soaring Falcons	

=== Statistics ===
==== Players' statistical points ====
#	Player	Team	Total
1	(Democratic Republic of the Congo) Grace Irebu	UST Growling Tigresses	90.00
2	(Philippines) Mar Prado	Adamson Lady Falcons	86.00
3	(Philippines) Jack Animam	NU Lady Bulldogs	78.57
4	(Democratic Republic of the Congo) Rhena Itesi	NU Lady Bulldogs	67.07
5	(Philippines) Clare Castro	FEU Lady Tamaraws	66.64

==== Season player highs ====
Statistic	Player	Team	Average
Points	(Philippines) Mar Prado	Adamson Lady Falcons	23.14
Rebounds	(Democratic Republic of the Congo) Grace Irebu	UST Growling Tigresses	15.14
Assists	(Philippines) Jearzy Ganade	UE Lady Warriors	5.93
Steals	(Philippines) Mar Prado	Adamson Lady Falcons	3.43
Blocks	(Philippines) Clare Castro	FEU Lady Tamaraws	3.36

==== Game player highs ====
Statistic	Player	Team	Total	Opponent
Points	(Philippines) Mar Prado	Adamson Lady Falcons	40	UP Lady Maroons
Rebounds	(Democratic Republic of the Congo) Grace Irebu	UST Growling Tigresses	25	Ateneo Lady Eagles
Assists	(Philippines) Jearzy Ganade	UE Lady Warriors	12	UP Lady Maroons
Steals	(Philippines) Tacky Tacatac	UST Growling Tigresses	9	UP Lady Maroons
Blocks	(Philippines) Clare Castro	FEU Lady Tamaraws	8	UP Lady Maroons

==== Game team highs ====
Statistic	Team	Total	Opponent
Points	NU Lady Bulldogs	112	De La Salle Lady Archers
Rebounds	UST Growling Tigresses; NU Lady Bulldogs	68	Ateneo Lady Eagles; UP Lady Maroons
Assists	NU Lady Bulldogs	34	De La Salle Lady Archers
Steals	NU Lady Bulldogs	32	UP Lady Maroons
Blocks	FEU Lady Tamaraws	9	UP Lady Maroons

==== Season team highs ====
Statistic	Team	Average
Points	NU Lady Bulldogs	90.14
Rebounds	NU Lady Bulldogs	54
Assists	NU Lady Bulldogs	22.93
Steals	Adamson Lady Falcons	13.29
Blocks	FEU Lady Tamaraws	4.07

== Boys' tournament ==
=== Elimination round ===
==== Team standings ====
Pos	Team	W	L	PCT	GB	Qualification
1	NUNS Bullpups	14	0	1.000	—	Advance to the Finals (Note: As NSNU won all of their elimination round games, the stepladder format was used instead of the regular Final Four format.)
2	FEU–D Baby Tamaraws	12	2	.857	2	Twice-to-beat in stepladder round 2
3	Ateneo Blue Eaglets (H)	8	6	.571 (Note: Head-to-head record: Ateneo 1–1 Adamson (Ateneo +5))	6	Proceed to stepladder round 1
4	Adamson Baby Falcons	8	6	.571	6	Proceed to stepladder round 1
5	UST Tiger Cubs	7	7	.500	7	
6	UE Junior Red Warriors	3	11	.214 (Note: Head-to-head record: UE 1–1 DLSZ (UE +12))	11	
7	Zobel Junior Archers	3	11	.214	11	
8	UPIS Junior Fighting Maroons	1	13	.071	13	

Source: ABS-CBN Sports
Rules for classification: 1) winning percentage; 2) if tied for #2 or #4, one-game playoff; 3) head-to-head record; 4) head-to-head point differential; 5) overall point differential
(H) Hosts

==== Match-up results ====
	Round 1							Round 2						
Team ╲ Game	1	2	3	4	5	6	7	8	9	10	11	12	13	14
Adamson	Ateneo school colors	UP school colors	NU school colors	UST school colors	La Salle school colors	UE school colors	FEU school colors	FEU school colors	NU school colors	UST school colors	La Salle school colors	UP school colors	UE school colors	Ateneo school colors
Ateneo	Adamson school colors	La Salle school colors	FEU school colors	UE school colors	UP school colors	UST school colors	NU school colors	NU school colors	FEU school colors	UP school colors	UST school colors	UE school colors	La Salle school colors	Adamson school colors
DLSZ	UP school colors	Ateneo school colors	UE school colors	NU school colors	Adamson school colors	FEU school colors	UST school colors	UP school colors	UE school colors	NU school colors	Adamson school colors	FEU school colors	Ateneo school colors	UST school colors
FEU–D	NU school colors	UE school colors	Ateneo school colors	UP school colors	UST school colors	La Salle school colors	Adamson school colors	Adamson school colors	Ateneo school colors	UE school colors	UP school colors	La Salle school colors	UST school colors	NU school colors
NSNU	FEU school colors	UST school colors	Adamson school colors	La Salle school colors	UE school colors	UP school colors	Ateneo school colors	Ateneo school colors	Adamson school colors	La Salle school colors	UE school colors	UST school colors	UP school colors	FEU school colors
UE	UST school colors	FEU school colors	La Salle school colors	Ateneo school colors	NU school colors	Adamson school colors	UP school colors	UST school colors	La Salle school colors	FEU school colors	NU school colors	Ateneo school colors	Adamson school colors	UP school colors
UPIS	La Salle school colors	Adamson school colors	UST school colors	FEU school colors	Ateneo school colors	NU school colors	UE school colors	La Salle school colors	UST school colors	Ateneo school colors	FEU school colors	Adamson school colors	NU school colors	UE school colors
UST	UE school colors	NU school colors	UP school colors	Adamson school colors	FEU school colors	Ateneo school colors	La Salle school colors	UE school colors	UP school colors	Adamson school colors	Ateneo school colors	NU school colors	FEU school colors	La Salle school colors

= Win; = OT win; = Loss; = OT loss

==== Scores ====
Results on top and to the right of the dashes are for first-round games; those to the bottom and to the left of it are second-round games.

Teams	AdU	ADMU	DLSZ	FEU	NSNU	UE	UPIS	UST
Adamson Baby Falcons	—	61–69	89–57	81–89	60–82	72–65	95–71	69–62
Ateneo Blue Eaglets	76–79	—	81–78	75–82	71–102	80–81	99–70	85–81*
De La Salle Junior Archers	81–89*	52–79	—	63–80	57–86	75–74	84–72	65–68
FEU Baby Tamaraws	67–59	67–57	65–46	—	49–64	74–45	67–56	80–73
NSNU Bullpups	94–79	81–78	100–76	80–73	—	82–60	115–56	89–77
UE Junior Warriors	68–124	54–78	81–68	46–70	60–124	—	77–70	76–86
UPIS Junior Maroons	70–81	84–104	81–94	66–115	76–113	86–81	—	59–102
UST Tiger Cubs	88–80	74–79	95–87	73–81	66–77	90–63	87–63	—

Source: ABS-CBN Sports
Legend: Blue = left column team win; Red = top row team win.
Matches with lighter background shading were decided after overtime.

=== Bracket ===
Stepladder round 1 (Single-elimination)
3	Ateneo	75
4	Adamson	84

Stepladder round 2 (No. 2 twice-to-beat)
2	FEU	78
4	Adamson	65

Finals (Best-of-three playoff)
1	NU	79	87
2	FEU	61	80

=== Stepladder semifinals ===
==== (3) Ateneo vs. (4) Adamson ====
This is a single-elimination game.

S+A

February 12
3:00 p.m.PHT

Boxscore

Ateneo Blue Eaglets	75–84	Adamson Baby Falcons
Scoring by quarter: 22–8, 9–21, 27–28, 17–27
Pts: Forthsky Padrigao 22; Rebs: Forthsky Padrigao 8 Asts: Josh Lazaro 10		Pts: John Erolon 16; Rebs: Nicole Quinal 6 Asts: John Figueroa 22
Adamson advances to the stepladder round 2

Filoil Flying V Centre, San Juan

==== (2) FEU Diliman vs. (4) Adamson ====
FEU Baby Tamaraws have a twice-to-beat advantage.

S+A

February 28
3:00 p.m.PHT

Boxscore

FEU–D Baby Tamaraws	78–65	Adamson Baby Falcons
Scoring by quarter: 24–17, 19–14, 19–20, 16–14
Pts: Anfernee Estacio 18; Rebs: Patrick Sleat 5 Asts: Cholo Añonuevo 14		Pts: Joshua Barcelona 12; Rebs: John Erolon 6 Asts: Joshua Barcelona 12
FEU Diliman wins series in one game

Filoil Flying V Centre, San Juan

=== Finals ===
This is a best-of-three playoff.

S+A

March 6
3:00 p.m.PHT

Boxscore

NUNS Bullpups	79–61	FEU–D Baby Tamaraws
Scoring by quarter: 17–22, 26–14, 24–12, 12–13
Pts: Terence Fortea 24; Rebs: Ernest Felicida 8 Asts: Quiambao, Tamayo 14 each		Pts: Cholo Anonuevo 13; Rebs: John Pasaol 3 Asts: Cholo Anonuevo 11

Filoil Flying V Centre, San Juan City
Referees: Edgar Orpilla, Mollie de Luna, John Lester Celeste

S+A

March 9
3:00 p.m.PHT

Boxscore

NUNS Bullpups	87–80	FEU–D Baby Tamaraws
Scoring by quarter: 24–17, 29–28, 22–17, 12–18
Pts: Carl Tamayo 26; Rebs: Terence Fortea 4 Asts: Carl Tamayo 22		Pts: John Pasaol 20; Rebs: Cholo Anonuevo 5 Asts: Cholo Anonuevo 11
NSNU wins series, 2–0

Filoil Flying V Centre, San Juan
Referees: Edgar Orpilla, Julius Medillo, Jaime Rivano

- Finals Most Valuable Player: Carl Tamayo (NUNS Bullpups)

=== Awards ===
UAAP Season 82 boys' basketball champions
NUNS Bullpups
Eighth title, second consecutive title

- Most Valuable Player: Jake Figueroa (Adamson Baby Falcons)
- Rookie of the Year: Jean Lorenz Canillas (UPIS Junior Fighting Maroons)
- Mythical Five:
  - Jake Figueroa (Adamson Baby Falcons)
  - Joshua Lazaro (Ateneo Blue Eaglets)
  - Francis Lopez (Ateneo Blue Eaglets)
  - Kevin Quiambao (NUNS Bullpups)
  - Sean Aldous Torculas (UPIS Junior Fighting Maroons)

== Girls' tournament ==
=== Elimination round ===
==== Team standings ====
Pos	Team	W	L	PCT	GB	Qualification
1	Adamson Lady Baby Falcons	6	0	1.000	—	Advance to the Finals
2	UST Junior Tigresses	4	2	.667	2	Advance to the Finals
3	Zobel Junior Lady Archers	2	4	.333	4	
4	Ateneo Lady Eaglets	0	6	.000	6	

Source: ABS-CBN Sports
Rules for classification: 1) winning percentage; 2) if tied for #2, one-game playoff; 3) head-to-head record; 4) head-to-head point differential; 5) overall point differential

==== Match-up results ====
	Round 1			Round 2		
Team ╲ Game	1	2	3	4	5	6
Adamson	Ateneo school colors	UST school colors	La Salle school colors	La Salle school colors	UST school colors	Ateneo school colors
Ateneo	Adamson school colors	La Salle school colors	UST school colors	UST school colors	La Salle school colors	Adamson school colors
DLSZ	UST school colors	Ateneo school colors	Adamson school colors	Adamson school colors	Ateneo school colors	UST school colors
UST	La Salle school colors	Adamson school colors	Ateneo school colors	Ateneo school colors	Adamson school colors	La Salle school colors

= Win; = OT win; = Loss; = OT loss

==== Scores ====
Results on top and to the right of the dashes are for first-round games; those to the bottom and to the left of it are second-round games.

Teams	AdU	AdMU	DLSZ	UST
Adamson Lady Baby Falcons	—	121–44	56–39	81–70
Ateneo Lady Eaglets	38–109	—	36–105	27–112
Zobel Junior Lady Archers	70–80	88–24	—	45–63
UST Junior Tigresses	64–70	108–28	50–48	—

Source: ABS-CBN Sports
Legend: Blue = left column team win; Red = top row team win.

=== Finals ===
This is a best-of-three playoff.

March 6
12:00 p.m.PHT

Boxscore

Adamson Lady Baby Falcons	68–73	UST Junior Tigresses
Scoring by quarter: 22–17, 17–17, 9–21, 20–18
Pts: Joan Camagong 24; Rebs: Crisnalyn Padilla 5 Asts: Charlene Carcallas 13		Pts: Erika Danganan 19; Rebs: Nicole Danganan 7 Asts: Rachel Lacayanga 12

Filoil Flying V Centre, San Juan

March 9
12:00 p.m.PHT

Boxscore

Adamson Lady Baby Falcons	79–74	UST Junior Tigresses
Scoring by quarter: 23–22, 29–22, 14–11, 13–19
Pts: Joan Camagong 29; Rebs: Charlene Carcallas 13; Asts: Crisnalyn Padilla 7		Pts: Nicole Danganan 23; Rebs: E. Danganan, Estudillo 10 each Asts: Nicole Danganan 7

Filoil Flying V Centre, San Juan

March 13
12:00 p.m.PHT

Adamson Lady Baby Falcons	–	UST Junior Tigresses
Cancelled
Series cancelled tied 1–1; Adamson and UST were declared co-champions

Filoil Flying V Centre, San Juan

Due to the COVID-19 pandemic, game two was held behind closed doors, while Game 3 was initially postponed to a later date, then cancelled. The UAAP then declared both finalists as co-champions.

=== Awards ===
- Most Valuable Player: Crisnalyn Padilla (Adamson Lady Baby Falcons)
- Mythical Five:
  - Crisnalyn Padilla (Adamson Lady Baby Falcons)
  - Joan Camagong (Adamson Lady Baby Falcons)
  - Katrina Agojo (Adamson Lady Baby Falcons)
  - Erika Danganan (UST Junior Tigresses)
  - Brigette Santos (UST Junior Tigresses)

== Overall championship points ==
=== Seniors' division ===
Team	Men	Women	Total
UST Growling Tigers	12	12	24
Ateneo Blue Eagles	15	4	19
FEU Tamaraws	8	10	18
NU Bulldogs	1	15	16
UP Fighting Maroons	10	2	12
Adamson Soaring Falcons	4	8	12
De La Salle Green Archers	6	6	12
UE Red Warriors	2	1	3

Pts.	Ranking
15	Champion
12	2nd
10	3rd
8	4th
6	5th
4	6th
2	7th
1	8th
—	Did not join
WD	Withdrew

In case of a tie, the team with the higher position in any tournament is ranked higher. If both are still tied, they are listed by alphabetical order.

How rankings are determined:

- Ranks 5th to 8th determined by elimination round standings.
- Loser of the #1 vs #4 semifinal match-up is ranked 4th
  - If stepladder: Loser of stepladder semifinals round 1 is ranked 4th
- Loser of the #2 vs #3 semifinal match-up is ranked 3rd
  - If stepladder: Loser of stepladder semifinals round 2 is ranked 3rd
- Loser of the finals is ranked 2nd
- Champion is ranked 1st

== See also ==
- NCAA Season 95 basketball tournaments

== Notes ==
Preceded by Season 81 (2018)	UAAP men's basketball seasons Season 82 (2019)	Succeeded by Season 84 (2021)
Preceded by Season 81 (2018)	UAAP women's basketball seasons Season 82 (2019)	Succeeded by Season 85 (2022)
Preceded by Season 81 (2019–20)	UAAP juniors' basketball seasons Season 82 (2019)	Succeeded by Season 85 (2022–23)
