= UAAP Season 82 =

University athletic year

- "All for More"
- Host school: Ateneo de Manila University

Overall
- Seniors: University of Santo Tomas
- Juniors: University of Santo Tomas

Collegiate champions
Sport		Men	Women
Basketball		Ateneo	NU
Beach volleyball		UST	UST
Fencing		UE	UE
Swimming		Ateneo	Ateneo
Badminton		NU	Ateneo
Chess		FEU	FEU
Judo		UST	UE
Table tennis		UST	UST
Taekwondo		NU	NU
- Poomsae: La Salle (Coed)
- Cheerdance: NU (Ex - Coed)

High School champions
Sport		Boys	Girls
Basketball		NU	Adamson; UST (DS)
Volleyball		NU	NU
Football		FEU	NT
Baseball		UST	NT
Fencing		UE	UE
Swimming		UST	UST
Chess		UE	NU
Judo		UST	UE
Table tennis		La Salle	La Salle
Taekwondo		UST	NT
3x3 basketball		NT	NT
- (NT) = No tournament; (DS) = Demonstration Sport; (Ex) = Exhibition;

UAAP Season 82 was the 2019–20 athletic year of the University Athletic Association of the Philippines (UAAP). The season was hosted by the Ateneo de Manila University.

The eight member universities of the UAAP competed in the league's sixteen sport disciplines to vie for the general championship as 3x3 Basketball will now be included as a medal event in the Seniors level, with points counted towards the general championships.

The season was cancelled mid-way on April 7, 2020, due to the coronavirus pandemic which spread to the Philippines by January 2020 after the enhanced community quarantine was extended to April 30, 2020.

== Press conference ==
A press conference was held at MOA Arena in the morning of September 1, 2019. The following were announced by the UAAP Board: In support of the 2019 Southeast Asian Games that the Philippines will host from November 30, 2019 to December 11, 2019, no UAAP event will be held for the duration of the regional meet; necessitating triple-headers during Wednesdays for men's and women's basketball in order for the tournament to end by the third week of November. Another way of ensuring the league's full cooperation, the UAAP Board will move some of the traditional first semester sports events into the second semester.

Host Ateneo de Manila University announced the addition of new sporting events in both the collegiate and high school divisions. Starting season 82, 3x3 Basketball will be an official sport. For the high school division, boys' and girls' beach volleyball will be added as medal events and boys' and girls' lawn tennis as demo sports. For the first time in league history, a girls' basketball tournament will be held as a demonstration sport starting UAAP Season 82. National University will serve as the sub-host for this inaugural tournament.

UAAP President Em Fernandez explained that for the past two seasons, 3x3 basketball has been a demonstration sport and with the active participation of all member schools, the league has deemed to upgrade it as an official sport, raising the medal events in the collegiate level to 31.

Far Eastern University will serve as the sub-host for this season's 3x3 basketball tournament that is set to take place in March 2020.

On the other hand, lawn tennis and beach volleyball in the high school division will be making its debut.

Beach volleyball, which will be sub-hosted by University of Santo Tomas, will open its curtains in January 2020 while lawn tennis, which will be sub-hosted by National University, is scheduled to take place in February 2020.

== Opening ceremony ==
The opening ceremony of UAAP Season 82 was held on September 1, 2019 at the Mall of Asia Arena. "All for More" is the theme for Season 82. Like Season 74 (the last time Ateneo hosted) and Season 79, the start of the men's basketball games won't be held after the opening ceremony. Instead, it will be held three days later on September 4, 2019 at the Smart Araneta Coliseum. The high school volleyball tournament also commences on the same day.

== Sports calendar ==
This is the calendar of sports events of UAAP Season 82. The list includes the tournament host schools and the venues. Note should be taken for a compressed calendar as the Philippines will also be hosting the 2019 Southeast Asian Games in the middle of the season, from November to December.

=== First semester ===
Sport/Division	Event Host	Duration	Venue/s
Basketball (Collegiate)	Ateneo de Manila University	Sept. 4–Nov. 23, 2019	Smart Araneta Coliseum, Mall of Asia Arena, UST Quadricentennial Pavilion, Ynares Center Antipolo
Volleyball (High School)	Far Eastern University	Sept. 4–Nov. 17, 2019	Ateneo Blue Eagle Gym, Paco Arena
Chess (Collegiate/High School)	University of Santo Tomas	Sept. 14–Oct. 27, 2019	UST Quadricentennial Pavilion
Badminton (Collegiate)		Sept. 18–Oct. 5, 2019	Centro Atletico Badminton Center, Camp Crame Sports Center
Beach volleyball (Collegiate)	University of Santo Tomas	Sept. 22–Oct. 6, 2019	Sands at SM by the Bay
Baseball (High School–Boys)		Oct. 8–29, 2019	Rizal Memorial Baseball Stadium
Taekwondo (Kyorugi) (Collegiate/Boys)		Oct. 14–19, 2019	Ateneo Blue Eagle Gym
Taekwondo (Poomsae) (Collegiate/Boys)		Oct. 14, 2019	Ateneo Blue Eagle Gym
Swimming (Collegiate/High School)	University of the Philippines	Oct. 17–20, 2019	TRACE Aquatics Sports Complex in Los Baños, Laguna
Table Tennis (Collegiate/Boys)		Nov. 9–20, 2019	Ateneo Blue Eagle Gym
Basketball (High School–Boys)	National University	Nov. 13–Mar. 9, 2019	Paco Arena, Ateneo Blue Eagle Gym
Cheerdance (Coed)	Special Events Committee	Nov. 17, 2019	Mall of Asia Arena

=== Second semester ===
Sport/Division	Event Host	Duration	Venue
Football (High School–Boys)	De La Salle University	Jan. 5–Mar. 7, 2020	Rizal Memorial Football Stadium, FEU–Diliman Football Field in Quezon City
Basketball (High School–Girls)	National University	Jan. 11–Mar. 9, 2020	Paco Arena
Beach volleyball (High School)	University of Santo Tomas	Feb. 1–14, 2020 (cancelled)	Sands at SM by the Bay
Fencing (Collegiate/High School)	University of the East	Feb. 11–14, 2020	Paco Arena
Judo (Collegiate/High School)		Feb. 29–Mar. 1, 2020	SM Mall of Asia in Bay City
Volleyball (Collegiate)	Ateneo de Manila University	Mar. 3–10, 2020 (cancelled)	SM Mall of Asia Arena, PhilSports Arena
Football (Collegiate)	De La Salle University	Mar. 5–10, 2020 (cancelled)	Rizal Memorial Football Stadium, CV Pitch–Circulo Verde in Quezon City
Baseball (Collegiate–Men)	Adamson University	Cancelled	Rizal Memorial Baseball Stadium
Softball (Collegiate–Women)	Adamson University	Cancelled	Rizal Memorial Baseball Stadium
Athletics (Collegiate/High School)		Cancelled	PhilSports Complex Track Oval in Pasig City
Lawn tennis (Collegiate/High School)	National University	Cancelled	Colegio San Agustin–Bulacan Tennis Stadium in San Jose del Monte City, Bulacan
Basketball 3×3 (Collegiate/High School)	Far Eastern University	Cancelled	Ayala Malls Feliz in Pasig
Ballroom Formation Dance	Special Events Committee	Cancelled	UST Quadricentennial Pavilion
Streetdance (Coed)		Cancelled	Smart Araneta Coliseum

== Basketball ==
The UAAP Season 82 collegiate basketball tournament began on September 4, 2019 at the Smart Araneta Coliseum. The tournament host is the Ateneo de Manila University. Jensen Ilagan and Edith Boticario are the tournament and deputy tournament commissioners, respectively. The tournament director is former Ateneo Blue Eagle and ex-Lyceum Jrs. head coach Lawrence Anthony "L.A." Mumar. The UAAP will adopt FIBA rules on technicals, timeouts, among others. The primary playing venues are the Mall of Asia Arena and the Smart Araneta Coliseum. The Ynares Center Antipolo and the UST's Quadricentennial Pavilion will serve as alternate venues when the MOA Arena and Araneta Coliseum are not available. the University Athletic Association of the Philippines (UAAP) will tap the services of its own exclusive group of referees.

=== Men's tournament ===
==== Elimination round ====
Pos	Team	W	L	PCT	GB	Qualification
1	Ateneo Blue Eagles (H)	14	0	1.000	—	Advance to the Finals (Note: As Ateneo won all of their elimination round games, the stepladder format was used instead of the regular Final Four format.)
2	UP Fighting Maroons	9	5	.643	5	Twice-to-beat in stepladder round 2
3	FEU Tamaraws	8	6	.571 (Note: Head-to-head record: FEU 1–1 UST (FEU +6))	6	Proceed to stepladder round 1
4	UST Growling Tigers	8	6	.571	6	Proceed to stepladder round 1
5	De La Salle Green Archers	7	7	.500	7	
6	Adamson Soaring Falcons	4	10	.286 (Note: Head-to-head record: Adamson 1–1 UE (Adamson +5))	10	
7	UE Red Warriors	4	10	.286	10	
8	NU Bulldogs	2	12	.143	12	

Source: ABS-CBN Sports
Rules for classification: 1) winning percentage; 2) if tied for #2 or #4, one-game playoff; 3) head-to-head record; 4) head-to-head point differential; 5) overall point differential
(H) Hosts

==== Playoffs ====
Stepladder round 1 (Single-elimination)
3	FEU	71
4	UST	81

Stepladder round 2 (No. 2 twice-to-beat)
2	UP	69	65
4	UST	89	68

Finals (Best-of-three playoff)
1	Ateneo	91	86
4	UST	77	79

==== Awards ====
- Most Valuable Player: Soulémane Chabi Yo (UST Growling Tigers)
- Rookie of the Year: Mark Nonoy (UST Growling Tigers)

=== Women's tournament ===
==== Elimination round ====
Pos	Team	W	L	PCT	GB	Qualification
1	NU Lady Bulldogs	14	0	1.000	—	Advance to the Finals (Note: As NU won all of their elimination round games, the stepladder format was used instead of the regular Final Four format.)
2	UST Growling Tigresses	11	3	.786	3	Twice-to-beat in stepladder round 2
3	Adamson Lady Falcons	9	5	.643	5	Proceed to stepladder round 1
4	FEU Lady Tamaraws	8	6	.571	6	Proceed to stepladder round 1
5	De La Salle Lady Archers	7	7	.500	7	
6	Ateneo Lady Eagles (H)	5	9	.357	9	
7	UP Fighting Maroons	1	13	.071 (Note: Head-to-head record: UP 1–1 UE (UP +1))	13	
8	UE Lady Warriors	1	13	.071	13	

Source: ABS-CBN Sports
Rules for classification: 1) winning percentage; 2) if tied for #2 or #4, one-game playoff; 3) head-to-head record; 4) head-to-head point differential; 5) overall point differential
(H) Hosts

==== Playoffs ====
Stepladder round 1 (Single-elimination)
3	Adamson	73
4	FEU	79

Stepladder round 2 (No. 2 twice-to-beat)
2	UST	46	76
4	FEU	48	65

Finals (Best-of-three playoff)
1	NU	70	66
2	UST	65	54

==== Awards ====
- Most Valuable Player: Grace Irebu (UST Growling Tigresses)
- Rookie of the Year: Kent Pastrana (De La Salle Lady Archers)

=== Boys' tournament ===
==== Elimination round ====
Pos	Team	W	L	PCT	GB	Qualification
1	NUNS Bullpups	14	0	1.000	—	Advance to the Finals (Note: As NSNU won all of their elimination round games, the stepladder format was used instead of the regular Final Four format.)
2	FEU–D Baby Tamaraws	12	2	.857	2	Twice-to-beat in stepladder round 2
3	Ateneo Blue Eaglets (H)	8	6	.571 (Note: Head-to-head record: Ateneo 1–1 Adamson (Ateneo +5))	6	Proceed to stepladder round 1
4	Adamson Baby Falcons	8	6	.571	6	Proceed to stepladder round 1
5	UST Tiger Cubs	7	7	.500	7	
6	UE Junior Red Warriors	3	11	.214 (Note: Head-to-head record: UE 1–1 DLSZ (UE +12))	11	
7	Zobel Junior Archers	3	11	.214	11	
8	UPIS Junior Fighting Maroons	1	13	.071	13	

Source: ABS-CBN Sports
Rules for classification: 1) winning percentage; 2) if tied for #2 or #4, one-game playoff; 3) head-to-head record; 4) head-to-head point differential; 5) overall point differential
(H) Hosts

==== Playoffs ====
Stepladder round 1 (Single-elimination)
3	Ateneo	75
4	Adamson	84

Stepladder round 2 (No. 2 twice-to-beat)
2	FEU	78
4	Adamson	65

Finals (Best-of-three playoff)
1	NU	79	87
2	FEU	61	80

==== Awards ====
- Most Valuable Player: Jake Figueroa (Adamson Baby Falcons)
- Rookie of the Year: Jean Lorenz Canillas (UPIS Junior Fighting Maroons)

=== Girls' tournament ===
==== Elimination round ====
Pos	Team	W	L	PCT	GB	Qualification
1	Adamson Lady Baby Falcons	6	0	1.000	—	Advance to the Finals
2	UST Junior Tigresses	4	2	.667	2	Advance to the Finals
3	Zobel Junior Lady Archers	2	4	.333	4	
4	Ateneo Lady Eaglets	0	6	.000	6	

Source: ABS-CBN Sports
Rules for classification: 1) winning percentage; 2) if tied for #2, one-game playoff; 3) head-to-head record; 4) head-to-head point differential; 5) overall point differential

==== Playoffs ====
Finals; Best-of-three series
March 6 and 9
1 Adamson	68	79	(Note: The winner-take-all Game 3 of girls' basketball has been cancelled as a result of COVID-19 pandemic. Hence, Adamson and UST have been declared co-champions.)
2 UST	73	74

==== Awards ====
- Most Valuable Player: Crisnalyn Padilla (Adamson Lady Baby Falcons)

== Volleyball ==
The UAAP Season 82 volleyball tournaments started on September 4, 2019 with the high school tournaments and will start on March 3, 2020 for the collegiate tournaments. The games were played at the Filoil Flying V Centre, SM Mall of Asia Arena, Smart Araneta Coliseum, PhilSports Arena (ULTRA), Paco Arene and the Blue Eagle Gym. The volleyball tournament commissioner is Noreen Go.

The UAAP is implementing the use of the video challenge for Season 82 collegiate division volleyball tournaments as an effort to enhance the level of play and follow the international standards of the sport. UAAP president Em Fernandez of season host Ateneo de Manila University announced on February 11, 2020 in its first press conference for volleyball the new innovation that is expected to make the competition even more exciting.

The new system allowed coaches to challenge a call or non-call thru a video review. The system was utilized starting right from the opening games of the men's and women's divisions.

However both the senior men's and women's tournament was cancelled due to the COVID-19 pandemic.

=== Men's tournament ===
==== Elimination round ====
===== Team standings =====
Pos	Team	Pld	W	L	Pts	SW	SL	SR	SPW	SPL	SPR
1	NU Bulldogs	2	2	0	6	6	1	6.000	177	145	1.221
2	FEU Tamaraws	2	2	0	5	6	2	3.000	184	161	1.143
3	UP Fighting Maroons	2	1	1	3	4	3	1.333	157	164	0.957
4	Ateneo Blue Eagles (H)	2	1	1	3	3	3	1.000	140	139	1.007
5	UE Red Warriors	2	1	1	3	3	4	0.750	156	157	0.994
6	De La Salle Green Archers	1	0	1	0	0	3	0.000	64	77	0.831
7	Adamson Soaring Falcons	1	0	1	0	0	3	0.000	51	75	0.680
8	UST Growling Tigers	2	0	2	1	3	6	0.500	202	211	0.957

Updated to match(es) played on March 8, 2020. Source: ABS-CBN Sports
Rules for classification: 1) number of wins; 2) if tied for #2 or #4, one-game playoff; 3) match points; 4) sets ratio; 5) points ratio; 6) head-to-head record
(H) Host

=== Women's tournament ===
==== Elimination round ====
===== Team standings =====
Pos	Team	Pld	W	L	Pts	SW	SL	SR	SPW	SPL	SPR
1	NU Lady Bulldogs	2	2	0	5	6	2	3.000	183	165	1.109
2	De La Salle Lady Archers	1	1	0	3	3	1	3.000	92	74	1.243
3	UST Growling Tigresses	2	1	1	4	5	3	1.667	181	161	1.124
4	Ateneo Lady Eagles (H)	2	1	1	3	4	3	1.333	149	145	1.028
5	FEU Lady Tamaraws	2	1	1	3	3	3	1.000	129	121	1.066
6	UP Lady Maroons	2	1	1	3	3	4	0.750	146	160	0.913
7	Adamson Lady Falcons	1	0	1	0	0	3	0.000	59	76	0.776
8	UE Lady Warriors	2	0	2	0	1	6	0.167	131	168	0.780

Updated to match(es) played on March 8, 2020. Source: ABS-CBN Sports
Rules for classification: 1) number of wins; 2) if tied for #2 or #4, one-game playoff; 3) match points; 4) sets ratio; 5) points ratio; 6) head-to-head record
(H) Host

=== Boys' tournament ===
==== Elimination round ====
===== Team standings =====
Pos	Team	Pld	W	L	Pts	SW	SL	SR	SPW	SPL	SPR	Qualification
1	FEU Baby Tamaraws	12	11	1	31	35	13	2.692	1141	1004	1.136	Twice-to-beat in the semifinals
2	UE Junior Warriors	12	10	2	30	32	11	2.909	1024	864	1.185	Twice-to-beat in the semifinals
3	NSNU Bullpups	12	7	5	21	25	19	1.316	1001	945	1.059	Twice-to-win in the semifinals
4	UST Tiger Cubs	12	6	6	18 (Note: Fourth-seed playoff: UST 3–0)	23	23	1.000	1063	997	1.066	Twice-to-win in the semifinals
5	Adamson Baby Falcons	12	6	6	20	24	20	1.200	1018	994	1.024	Qualified to fourth-seed playoff
6	DLSZ Junior Archers	12	1	11	4 (Note: Head-to-head record: DLSZ 1–1 Ateneo; DLSZ +2)	11	34	0.324	889	1048	0.848	
7	Ateneo Blue Eaglets (H)	12	1	11	2	5	35	0.143	721	980	0.736	

Source: ABS-CBN Sports
Rules for classification: 1) number of wins; 2) if tied for #2 or #4, one-game playoff; 3) match points; 4) sets ratio; 5) points ratio; 6) head-to-head record
(H) Host

==== Playoffs ====
Fourth-seed playoff
Adamson	0
UST	3

Semifinals; Top seeds twice-to-beat
1	FEU	1	3
4	UST	3	0
2	UE	0	2
3	NSNU	3	3

Finals; Best-of-three series
1	FEU	1	0
3	NSNU	3	3

==== Awards ====
- Finals' Most Valuable Player: Mac Alvin Bandola (NUNS Bullpups)
- Most Valuable Player: Rans Cajolo (FEU–D Baby Tamaraws)
- Rookie of the Year: Brent Maralit (UE Red Warriors)

=== Girls' tournament ===
==== Elimination round ====
===== Team standings =====
Pos	Team	Pld	W	L	Pts	SW	SL	SR	SPW	SPL	SPR	Qualification
1	NUNS Lady Bullpups	12	12	0	36	36	2	18.000	940	608	1.546	Advance to the Finals
2	UST Junior Tigresses	12	10	2	29	30	13	2.308	983	885	1.111	Twice-to-beat in stepladder round 2
3	Adamson Lady Baby Falcons	12	7	5	20	24	20	1.200	958	885	1.082	Stepladder round 1
4	Zobel Junior Lady Archers	12	6	6	18	22	22	1.000	952	988	0.964	Stepladder round 1
5	FEU–D Lady Baby Tamaraws	12	5	7	16	22	22	1.000	941	966	0.974	
6	UE Junior Lady Warriors	12	2	10	7	10	30	0.333	843	954	0.884	
7	UPIS Junior Lady Maroons	12	0	12	0	1	36	0.028	593	924	0.642	

Source: ABS-CBN Sports
Rules for classification: 1) number of wins; 2) if tied for #2 or #4, one-game playoff; 3) match points; 4) sets ratio; 5) points ratio; 6) head-to-head record

==== Playoffs ====
Stepladder round 1 (One-game playoff)
3	Adamson	3
4	DLSZ	0

Stepladder round 2 (No. 2 has twice-to-beat advantage)
2	UST	1	2
3	Adamson	3	3

Finals (Best-of-three series)
1	NSNU	3	3
3	Adamson	0	0

==== Awards ====
- Finals' Most Valuable Player: Evangeline Alinsug (NUNS Lady Bullpups)
- Season Most Valuable Player: Mhicaela Belen (NUNS Lady Bullpups)
- Rookie of the Year: Ela Raagas (UST Junior Tigresses)

== Beach volleyball ==
The UAAP beach volleyball tournament was expanded in Season 82. The tournament which has one division only - the Collegiate division - will have two divisions starting UAAP season 82 (2019-2020). A high school division for both boys and girls was added. All eight universities will field teams in the boys' tournament but only seven in the girls' tournament. University of the Philippines will not participate in the girls' tournament.

The collegiate tournament started on Sept. 22, 2019 and was concluded on October 6, 2019. While the high school tournament will start on February 1, 2020. The tournaments' venue is at the Sands SM by the Bay, SM Mall of Asia in Pasay, Metro Manila. University of Santo Tomas is the tournament host. Beach volleyball is a single round-robin elimination tournament.

=== Men's tournament ===
==== Elimination round ====
===== Team standings =====
Pos	Team	Pld	W	L	PCT	GB	Qualification
1	UST Growling Tigers (H)	7	7	0	1.000	—	Twice-to-beat in the semifinals
2	FEU Tamaraws	7	6	1	.857	1	Twice-to-beat in the semifinals
3	NU Bulldogs	7	5	2	.714	2	Twice-to-win in the semifinals
4	Adamson Soaring Falcons	7	4	3	.571	3	Twice-to-win in the semifinals
5	UP Fighting Maroons	7	3	4	.429	4	
6	De La Salle Green Archers	7	2	5	.286	5	
7	UE Red Warriors	7	1	6	.143	6	
8	Ateneo Blue Eagles	7	0	7	.000	7	

Source: ABS-CBN Sports
Rules for classification: 1) winning percentage; 2) if tied for #2 or #4, one-game playoff; 3) head-to-head record; 4) match points; 5) sets ratio; 6) points ratio
(H) Hosts

===== Match-up results =====
Team ╲ Game	1	2	3	4	5	6	7
Adamson	FEU school colors	La Salle school colors	UST school colors	UE school colors	UP school colors	Ateneo school colors	NU school colors
Ateneo	UE school colors	NU school colors	UP school colors	FEU school colors	UST school colors	Adamson school colors	La Salle school colors
La Salle	UP school colors	Adamson school colors	UE school colors	NU school colors	FEU school colors	UST school colors	Ateneo school colors
FEU	Adamson school colors	UP school colors	NU school colors	Ateneo school colors	La Salle school colors	UE school colors	UST school colors
NU	UST school colors	Ateneo school colors	FEU school colors	La Salle school colors	UE school colors	UP school colors	Adamson school colors
UE	Ateneo school colors	UST school colors	La Salle school colors	Adamson school colors	NU school colors	FEU school colors	UP school colors
UP	La Salle school colors	FEU school colors	Ateneo school colors	UST school colors	Adamson school colors	NU school colors	UE school colors
UST	NU school colors	UE school colors	Adamson school colors	UP school colors	Ateneo school colors	La Salle school colors	FEU school colors

= Win; = Loss

==== Playoffs ====
Semifinals #1 & #2 have twice-to-beat advantage
October 5
1 UST	2
4 Adamson	0
October 5
2 FEU	2
3 NU	1

Finals; Best-of-three series
October 6
1 UST	2	2
2 FEU	0	0
Third place playoff
October 6
NU	2
Adamson	1

==== Awards ====
- Most Valuable Player: Rancel Varga (UST Growling Tigers)
- Rookie of the Year: James Buytrago (NU Bulldogs)

=== Women's tournament ===
==== Elimination round ====
===== Team standings =====
Pos	Team	Pld	W	L	PCT	GB	Qualification
1	UST Growling Tigresses (H)	7	7	0	1.000	—	Twice-to-beat in the semifinals
2	De La Salle Lady Archers	7	6	1	.857	1	Twice-to-beat in the semifinals
3	FEU Lady Tamaraws	7	5	2	.714	2	Twice-to-win in the semifinals
4	Ateneo Lady Eagles	7	4	3	.571	3	Twice-to-win in the semifinals
5	UP Lady Maroons	7	3	4	.429	4	
6	Adamson Lady Falcons	7	2	5	.286	5	
7	UE Lady Warriors	7	1	6	.143	6	
8	NU Lady Bulldogs	7	0	7	.000	7	

Source: ABS-CBN Sports
Rules for classification: 1) winning percentage; 2) if tied for #2 or #4, one-game playoff; 3) head-to-head record; 4) match points; 5) sets ratio; 6) points ratio
(H) Hosts

===== Match-up results =====
Team ╲ Game	1	2	3	4	5	6	7
Adamson	UE school colors	La Salle school colors	FEU school colors	UST school colors	NU school colors	UP school colors	Ateneo school colors
Ateneo	FEU school colors	UST school colors	UE school colors	NU school colors	UP school colors	La Salle school colors	Adamson school colors
La Salle	NU school colors	Adamson school colors	UP school colors	FEU school colors	UE school colors	Ateneo school colors	UST school colors
FEU	Ateneo school colors	UP school colors	Adamson school colors	La Salle school colors	UST school colors	NU school colors	UE school colors
NU	La Salle school colors	UE school colors	UST school colors	Ateneo school colors	Adamson school colors	FEU school colors	UP school colors
UE	Adamson school colors	NU school colors	Ateneo school colors	UP school colors	La Salle school colors	UST school colors	FEU school colors
UP	UST school colors	FEU school colors	La Salle school colors	UE school colors	Ateneo school colors	Adamson school colors	NU school colors
UST	UP school colors	Ateneo school colors	NU school colors	Adamson school colors	FEU school colors	UE school colors	La Salle school colors

= Win; = Loss

==== Playoffs ====
Semifinals #1 & #2 have twice-to-beat advantage
October 5
1 UST	2
4 Ateneo	0
October 5
2 La Salle	2
3 FEU	1

Finals; Best-of-three series
October 6
1 UST	2	2
2 La Salle	1	0
Third place playoff
October 5
FEU	1
Ateneo	2

==== Awards ====
- Most Valuable Player: Babylove Barbon (UST Growling Tigresses)
- Rookie of the Year: Justine Jazareno (De La Salle Lady Archers)

=== Boys' tournament ===
The boy's tournament was cancelled prior to the play-offs.

==== Elimination round ====
===== Team standings =====
Pos	Team	Pld	W	L	PCT	GB	Qualification
1	UST Tiger Cubs (H)	5	5	0	1.000	—	Twice-to-beat in the semifinals
2	FEU–D Baby Tamaraws	5	4	1	.800	1	Twice-to-beat in the semifinals
3	UE Junior Red Warriors	5	3	2	.600	2	Twice-to-win in the semifinals
4	Adamson Baby Falcons	5	2	3	.400	3	Twice-to-win in the semifinals
5	Ateneo Blue Eaglets	5	2	3	.400	3	
6	NUNS Bullpups	5	2	3	.400	3	
7	Zobel Junior Archers	5	2	3	.400	3	
8	UPIS Junior Fighting Maroons	5	0	5	.000	5	

Updated to match(es) played on Feb. 8, 2020. Source: ABS-CBN Sports
Rules for classification: 1) winning percentage; 2) if tied for #2 or #4, one-game playoff; 3) head-to-head record; 4) match points; 5) sets ratio; 6) points ratio
(H) Hosts

===== Match-up results =====
Team ╲ Game	1	2	3	4	5	6	7
Adamson	UST school colors	NU school colors	UP school colors	UE school colors	FEU school colors	La Salle school colors	Ateneo school colors
Ateneo	UP school colors	La Salle school colors	UST school colors	NU school colors	UE school colors	FEU school colors	Adamson school colors
DLSZ	UE school colors	Ateneo school colors	FEU school colors	UST school colors	UP school colors	Adamson school colors	NU school colors
FEU–D	NU school colors	UST school colors	La Salle school colors	UP school colors	Adamson school colors	Ateneo school colors	UE school colors
NSNU	FEU school colors	Adamson school colors	UE school colors	Ateneo school colors	UST school colors	UP school colors	La Salle school colors
UE	La Salle school colors	UP school colors	NU school colors	Adamson school colors	Ateneo school colors	UST school colors	FEU school colors
UPIS	Ateneo school colors	UE school colors	Adamson school colors	FEU school colors	La Salle school colors	NU school colors	UST school colors
UST	Adamson school colors	FEU school colors	Ateneo school colors	La Salle school colors	NU school colors	UE school colors	UP school colors

= Win; = Loss; = Match cancelled

=== Girls' tournament ===
The girls' tournament was cancelled prior to the playoffs.

==== Elimination round ====
===== Team standings =====
Pos	Team	Pld	W	L	PCT	GB	Qualification
1	NUNS Lady Bullpups	4	4	0	1.000	—	Twice-to-beat in the semifinals
2	UST Junior Tigresses (H)	5	4	1	.800	0.5	Twice-to-beat in the semifinals
3	Zobel Junior Lady Archers	4	2	2	.500	2	Twice-to-win in the semifinals
4	Adamson Lady Baby Falcons	4	2	2	.500	2	Twice-to-win in the semifinals
5	UE Junior Lady Warriors	4	2	2	.500	2	
6	FEU–D Lady Baby Tamaraws	4	1	3	.250	3	
7	Ateneo Lady Eaglets	5	0	5	.000	4.5	

Updated to match(es) played on Feb. 9, 2020. Source: ABS-CBN Sports
Rules for classification: 1) winning percentage; 2) if tied for #2 or #4, one-game playoff; 3) head-to-head record; 4) match points; 5) sets ratio; 6) points ratio
(H) Hosts

===== Match-up results =====
Team ╲ Game	1	2	3	4	5	6
Adamson	UE school colors	Ateneo school colors	NU school colors	FEU school colors	UST school colors	La Salle school colors
Ateneo	FEU school colors	Adamson school colors	UST school colors	La Salle school colors	UE school colors	NU school colors
DLSZ	UST school colors	UE school colors	Ateneo school colors	NU school colors	FEU school colors	Adamson school colors
FEU–D	Ateneo school colors	NU school colors	Adamson school colors	UST school colors	La Salle school colors	UE school colors
NSNU	FEU school colors	Adamson school colors	UST school colors	La Salle school colors	UE school colors	Ateneo school colors
UE	Adamson school colors	UST school colors	La Salle school colors	Ateneo school colors	NU school colors	FEU school colors
UST	La Salle school colors	UE school colors	Ateneo school colors	NU school colors	FEU school colors	Adamson school colors

= Win; = Loss; = Match cancelled

== Football ==
The UAAP Season 82 football tournaments started on January 5, 2020 for the high school tournament and on March 5, 2020 for the collegiate tournament. The venue for the high school tournament will be at the Rizal Memorial Football Stadium and the FEU-Diliman Football Field, while the men's tournament will be played at the Moro Lorenzo Football Field and the FEU-Diliman Football Field. The women's tournament will be played at the CV Pitch Circulo Verde Quezon City. The tournament host is __________________.

=== Men's tournament ===
==== Elimination round ====
===== Team standings =====
Pos	Team	Pld	W	D	L	GF	GA	GD	Pts
1	Ateneo Blue Eagles	2	1	1	0	7	2	+5	4
2	FEU Tamaraws	2	1	1	0	6	1	+5	4
3	De La Salle Green Archers	2	1	1	0	3	2	+1	4
4	UP Fighting Maroons	2	1	1	0	2	1	+1	4
5	UE Red Warriors	2	1	0	1	3	7	−4	3
6	UST Growling Tigers	2	1	0	1	2	6	−4	3
7	Adamson Soaring Falcons	2	0	0	2	3	5	−2	0
8	NU Bulldogs	2	0	0	2	0	2	−2	0

Updated to match(es) played on March 5, 2020. Source:

===== Match-up results =====
	Round 1							Round 2						
Team ╲ Game	1	2	3	4	5	6	7	8	9	10	11	12	13	14
Adamson	UE school colors	La Salle school colors	NU school colors	Ateneo school colors	FEU school colors	UST school colors	UP school colors							
Ateneo	UP school colors	UST school colors	FEU school colors	Adamson school colors	NU school colors	La Salle school colors	UE school colors							
La Salle	FEU school colors	Adamson school colors	UP school colors	NU school colors	UE school colors	Ateneo school colors	UST school colors							
FEU	La Salle school colors	UE school colors	Ateneo school colors	UST school colors	Adamson school colors	UP school colors	NU school colors							
NU	UST school colors	Adamson school colors	La Salle school colors	UP school colors	Ateneo school colors	FEU school colors	UE school colors							
UE	Adamson school colors	FEU school colors	UST school colors	UP school colors	La Salle school colors	Ateneo school colors	NU school colors							
UP	Ateneo school colors	NU school colors	La Salle school colors	UE school colors	UST school colors	Adamson school colors	FEU school colors							
UST	NU school colors	Ateneo school colors	UE school colors	FEU school colors	UP school colors	Adamson school colors	La Salle school colors							

= Win; = Draw; = Loss; = Match cancelled

===== Results =====
Results on top and to the right of the dashes are for first-round games; those to the bottom and to the left of it are second-round games.

Teams	AdU	AdMU	DLSU	FEU	NU	UE	UP	UST
Adamson Soaring Falcons	—		1–2			2–3		
Ateneo Blue Eagles		—					1–1	6–1
De La Salle Green Archers			—	1–1				
FEU Tamaraws				—		5–0		
NU Bulldogs					—		0–1	0–1
UE Red Warriors						—		
UP Fighting Maroons							—	
UST Growling Tigers								—

Updated to match(es) played on March 5, 2020. Source: ABS-CBN Sports
Legend: Blue = left column team win; Yellow = draw; Red = top row team win.

=== Women's tournament ===
==== Elimination round ====
===== Team standings =====
Pos	Team	Pld	W	D	L	GF	GA	GD	Pts
1	FEU Lady Tamaraws	1	1	0	0	7	0	+7	3
2	UP Lady Maroons	1	1	0	0	1	0	+1	3
3	Ateneo Lady Eagles	1	0	0	1	0	7	−7	0
4	UST Growling Tigresses	1	0	0	1	0	1	−1	0
5	De La Salle Lady Archers	0	0	0	0	0	0	0	0

Updated to match(es) played on unknown. Source:

===== Match-up results =====
	Round 1				Round 2			
Team ╲ Game	1	2	3	4	5	6	7	8
Ateneo	FEU school colors							
La Salle								
FEU	Ateneo school colors							
UP	UST school colors							
UST	UP school colors							

= Win; = Draw; = Loss; = Match cancelled

===== Results =====
Results on top and to the right of the dashes are for first-round games; those to the bottom and to the left of it are second-round games.

Teams	AdMU	DLSU	FEU	UP	UST
Ateneo Lady Eagles	—		0–7		
De La Salle Lady Archers		—			
FEU Lady Tamaraws			—		
UP Lady Maroons				—	1–0
UST Growling Tigresses					—

Updated to match(es) played on unknown. Source: ABS-CBN Sports
Legend: Blue = left column team win; Yellow = draw; Red = top row team win.

=== Boys' tournament ===
The UAAP Season 82 high school football tournament started on January 5, 2020. The playing venue is at the Rizal Memorial Football Stadium. La Salle is the tournament host.

==== Elimination round ====
===== Team standings =====
Pos	Team	Pld	W	D	L	GF	GA	GD	Pts	Qualification
1	FEU–D Baby Tamaraws	8	6	2	0	21	3	+18	20	Finals
2	NUNS Bullpups	8	3	2	3	9	7	+2	11	Finals
3	Zobel Junior Archers (H)	8	3	1	4	13	11	+2	10	
4	UST Tiger Cubs	8	2	2	4	6	18	−12	8	
5	Ateneo Blue Eaglets	8	2	1	5	6	16	−10	7	

Source: ABS-CBN Sports
(H) Hosts

===== Match-up results =====
	Round 1				Round 2			
Team ╲ Game	1	2	3	4	5	6	7	8
Ateneo	UST school colors	NU school colors	La Salle school colors	FEU school colors	La Salle school colors	NU school colors	FEU school colors	UST school colors
DLSZ	NU school colors	Ateneo school colors	FEU school colors	UST school colors	Ateneo school colors	NU school colors	FEU school colors	UST school colors
FEU	UST school colors	NU school colors	La Salle school colors	Ateneo school colors	UST school colors	Ateneo school colors	La Salle school colors	NU school colors
NU	La Salle school colors	Ateneo school colors	FEU school colors	UST school colors	UST school colors	Ateneo school colors	La Salle school colors	FEU school colors
UST	Ateneo school colors	FEU school colors	NU school colors	La Salle school colors	NU school colors	FEU school colors	Ateneo school colors	La Salle school colors

= Win; = Win by forfeit; = Draw; = Loss; = Loss by forfeit

===== Results =====
Results on top and to the right of the dashes are for first-round games; those to the bottom and to the left of it are second-round games.

Teams	AdMU	DLSZ	FEU	NU	UST
Ateneo Blue Eaglets	—	2–3	0–0	1–0	1–0
Zobel Junior Archers	5–0	—	0–2	0–1	1–2
FEU–D Baby Tamaraws	4–0	4–1	—	2–1	6–0
NUNS Bullpups	2–1	0–0	0–2	—	1–1
UST Tiger Cubs	2–1	0–3 (Note: Match declared as forfeit since UST fielded ineligible player during the match.)	1–1	0–4	—

Source: ABS-CBN Sports
Legend: Blue = left column team win; Yellow = draw; Red = top row team win.

==== Finals ====
Team 1	Score	Team 2
FEU–D Baby Tamaraws	2-1	NUNS Bullpups

==== Awards ====
- Most Valuable Player: Pocholo Bugas (FEU–D Baby Tamaraws)
- Rookie of the Year: Andres Rafael Aldeguer (Zobel Junior Archers)
- Best Striker: Jacob Garciano (FEU–D Baby Tamaraws)
- Best Midfielder: Jacob Garciano (FEU–D Baby Tamaraws)
- Best Defender: Alimar Ambong (NUNS Bullpups)
- Best Goalkeeper: Enrico Mangaoang (Zobel Junior Archers)
- Fair Play Award: Ateneo Blue Eaglets

== Baseball ==
=== Boys' tournament ===
The UAAP Season 82 boys' division baseball tournament began on October 8, 2019, at the Rizal Memorial Baseball Stadium in Malate, Manila. The tournament host is Adamson University.

==== Elimination round ====
===== Team standings =====
Pos	Team	Pld	W	L	RF	RA	RD	Pts	Qualification
1	Ateneo Blue Eaglets	6	4	2	32	21	+11	10 (Note: Head-to-head runs allowed: Ateneo 17, UST 18, NU 24; second-seed playoff: UST 4–3 NU)	Advance to the Finals
2	UST Tiger Cubs	6	4	2	34	23	+11	10	Advance to the Finals
3	NUNS Bullpups	6	4	2	36	33	+3	10	Qualified to second-seed playoff
4	Zobel Junior Archers	6	0	6	18	43	−25	6	

Source: ABS-CBN Sports
Rules for classification: 1) number of wins; 2) if tied for #2, one-game playoff; 3) head-to-head record; 4) head-to-head run differential; 5) head-to-head fewest runs allowed

===== Match-up results =====
	Round 1			Round 2		
Team ╲ Game	1	2	3	4	5	6
Ateneo	UST school colors	La Salle school colors	NU school colors	UST school colors	La Salle school colors	NU school colors
DLSZ	NU school colors	Ateneo school colors	UST school colors	NU school colors	Ateneo school colors	UST school colors
NSNU	La Salle school colors	UST school colors	Ateneo school colors	La Salle school colors	UST school colors	Ateneo school colors
UST	Ateneo school colors	NU school colors	La Salle school colors	Ateneo school colors	NU school colors	La Salle school colors

= Win; = Loss

===== Scores =====
Results on top and to the right of the dashes are for first-round games; those to the bottom and to the left of it are second-round games.

Teams	AdMU	DLSZ	NU	UST
Ateneo Blue Eaglets	—	7–1	1–10	1–0
Zobel Junior Archers	3–9	—	3–4	2–12
NUNS Bullpups	0–12	7–6	—	15–3
UST Tiger Cubs	7–2	4–3	8–0	—

Source: ABS-CBN Sports
Legend: Blue = left column team win; Red = top row team win.

==== Playoffs ====
Second-seed playoff One-game playoff		Finals; Best-of-three series
		Ateneo	15	3	3
UST	4	UST	3	7	4
NU	3

==== Awards ====
- Season Most Valuable Player: John Matthew San Juan (Ateneo Blue Eaglets)
- Finals Most Valuable Player: John Rafael Regalado (UST Tiger Cubs)
- Rookie of the Year:
- Best Pitcher: Zachary Chris Urbina (Ateneo Blue Eaglets)
- Best Hitter: John Matthew San Juan (Ateneo Blue Eaglets)
- Best Slugger: John Matthew San Juan (Ateneo Blue Eaglets)
- Most Runs Batted-In: Regie Omana (NUNS Bullpups)
- Most Home-runs:
- Most Stolen Bases: Kean Agcaoili (Ateneo Blue Eaglets)

== Table tennis ==
The UAAP Season 82 table tennis tournament began on November 9, 2019. The tournament venue was the Ateneo Blue Eagle Gym. Ateneo de Manila was the tournament host.

=== Men's tournament ===
==== Elimination round ====
===== Team standings =====
Pos	Team	W	L	PCT	GB	Qualification
1	UST Growling Tigers	14	0	1.000	—	Advance to the Finals
2	NU Bulldogs	11	3	.786	3	Twice-to-beat in stepladder round 2
3	De La Salle Green Archers	9	5	.643	5	Stepladder round 1
4	Adamson Soaring Falcons	9	5	.643	5	Stepladder round 1
5	UE Red Warriors	7	7	.500	7	
6	FEU Tamaraws	2	12	.143	12	
7	UP Fighting Maroons	2	12	.143	12	
8	Ateneo Blue Eagles (H)	1	13	.071	13	

Rules for classification: 1) winning percentage; 2) if tied for #2 or #4, one-game playoff; 3) head-to-head record; 4) head-to-head point differential; 5) overall point differential
(H) Hosts

==== Playoffs ====
Stepladder round 1 (Single-elimination)
3	La Salle	3
4	Adamson	2

Stepladder round 2 (#2 twice-to-beat)
2	NU	3
3	La Salle	2

Finals (Best-of-three series)
1	UST	2	3	3
2	NU	3	1	1

==== Awards ====
- Most Valuable Player: Raymark Mabuang (UST Growling Tigers)
- Rookie of the Year: Jed Villaviray (Adamson Soaring Falcons)

=== Women's tournament ===
==== Elimination round ====
===== Team standings =====
Pos	Team	W	L	PCT	GB	Qualification
1	UST Growling Tigresses	13	1	.929	—	Twice-to-beat in the semifinals
2	Ateneo Lady Eagles (H)	11	3	.786 (Note: Second-seed playoff: Ateneo 3–0 La Salle)	2	Twice-to-beat in the semifinals
3	De La Salle Lady Archers	11	3	.786	2	Twice-to-win in the semifinals
4	FEU Lady Tamaraws	8	6	.571	5	Twice-to-win in the semifinals
5	UE Lady Warriors	6	8	.429	7	
6	UP Lady Maroons	5	9	.357	8	
7	Adamson Lady Falcons	2	12	.143	11	
8	NU Lady Bulldogs	0	14	.000	13	

Rules for classification: 1) winning percentage; 2) if tied for #2 or #4, one-game playoff; 3) head-to-head record; 4) head-to-head point differential; 5) overall point differential
(H) Hosts

==== Playoffs ====
2nd-seed playoff
3	La Salle	0
4	Ateneo	3

Semifinals; Top seeds twice-to-beat
1	UST	3
4	FEU	0
2	Ateneo	3
3	La Salle	1

Finals; Best-of-three series
1	UST	3	3
2	Ateneo	2	2

==== Awards ====
- Most Valuable Player: Sherlyn Gabisay (UST Growling Tigresses)
- Rookie of the Year: Kaela Aguilar (Ateneo Lady Eagles)

== Judo ==
The UAAP Season 82 judo championships was held from February 29, 2020 to March 1, 2020 at the SM Mall of Asia Arena. The tournament host is De La Salle University.

=== Men's tournament ===
==== Team standings ====
Rank	Team	Medals				Points
Rank	Team	1st place, gold medalist(s)	2nd place, silver medalist(s)	3rd place, bronze medalist(s)	**Total**	Points
Champions	UST	2	1	1	6	**34**
Runners-up	UP					**32**
Third-placers	**Ateneo**	2	2	3	7	**23**
4	La Salle					**8**

Event host in **boldface**

==== Awards ====
- Most Valuable Player: Gabriel Nick Ligero (UST Growling Tigers)
- Rookie of the Year: Jayvee Ferrer (UP Fighting Maroons)

=== Women's tournament ===
==== Team standings ====
Rank	Team	Medals				Points
Rank	Team	1st place, gold medalist(s)	2nd place, silver medalist(s)	3rd place, bronze medalist(s)	**Total**	Points
1st place, gold medalist(s)	UE					**30**
2nd place, silver medalist(s)	UST	1	2	4	7	**28**
3rd place, bronze medalist(s)	UP					**22**
4	**La Salle**					**12**
5	Ateneo		1		1	**5**

Event host in **boldface**

==== Awards ====
- Most Valuable Player: Jeanalane Lopez (UE Red Warriors)
- Rookie of the Year: Sydney Sy (UST Growling Tigers)

Medal	Pts.
1st	10
2nd	5
3rd	2

=== Boys' tournament ===
==== Team standings ====
Rank	Team	Medals				Points
Rank	Team	1st place, gold medalist(s)	2nd place, silver medalist(s)	3rd place, bronze medalist(s)	**Total**	Points
1st place, gold medalist(s)	UST					**24**
2nd place, silver medalist(s)	La Salle					**21**
3rd place, bronze medalist(s)	**FEU**					**18**
4	Ateneo					**16**
5	UE					
6	UP					

Event host in **boldface**

==== Awards ====
- Most Valuable Player: Joshua Quizon (UST Tiger Cubs)
- Rookie of the Year:

=== Girls' tournament ===
==== Team standings ====
Rank	Team	Medals				Points
Rank	Team	1st place, gold medalist(s)	2nd place, silver medalist(s)	3rd place, bronze medalist(s)	**Total**	Points
1st place, gold medalist(s)	UE					**37**
2nd place, silver medalist(s)	UST					'**26**
3rd place, bronze medalist(s)	**La Salle**					**17**
4	FEU					**8**
5	Ateneo					**6**

Event host in **boldface**

==== Awards ====
- Most Valuable Player:
- Rookie of the Year:

== Swimming ==
The UAAP Season 82 Swimming Championships was held from October 17–20, 2019 at the Trace Aquatic Center, Trace College, Laguna The tournament host is ______________ and tournament commissioner is __________ . The number of participating teams in the Girls' tournament increased by one school with the participation of Ateneo. There are now six schools participating.

Team ranking is determined by a point system, similar to that of the overall championship. The points given are based on the swimmer's/team's finish in the finals of an event, which include only the top eight finishers from the preliminaries. The gold medalist(s) receive 15 points, silver gets 12, bronze has 10. The following points: 8, 6, 4, 2 and 1 are given to the rest of the participating swimmers/teams according to their order of finish.

=== Men's tournament ===
==== Team standings ====
Rank	Team	Medals				Rec	Points
Rank	Team	1st place, gold medalist(s)	2nd place, silver medalist(s)	3rd place, bronze medalist(s)	**Total**	Rec	Points
1st place, gold medalist(s)	Ateneo	7	7	8	22		353
2nd place, silver medalist(s)	La Salle	5	3	1	9		343
3rd place, bronze medalist(s)	UST	3	3	6	12	1	322
4	**UP**						193
5	UE						

**Rec** - Number of new swimming records established
Event host in **boldface**

==== Awards ====
- Most Valuable Player: Sacho Ilustre (De La Salle Green Archers)
- Rookie of the Year: Jiron Rotoni (Ateneo Blue Eagles)

=== Women's tournament ===
==== Team standings ====
Rank	Team	Medals				Rec	Points
Rank	Team	1st place, gold medalist(s)	2nd place, silver medalist(s)	3rd place, bronze medalist(s)	**Total**	Rec	Points
1st place, gold medalist(s)	Ateneo	15	6	8	29	2	458
2nd place, silver medalist(s)	**UP**						395
3rd place, bronze medalist(s)	La Salle						203
4	UST						96
5	UE						

**Rec** - Number of new swimming records established
Event host in **boldface**

==== Awards ====
- Most Valuable Player: Kirsten Chloe Daos (Ateneo Blue Eagles)
- Rookie of the Year: Regina Maria Paz Castrillo (UP Fighting Maroons)

Pos.	Pts.
1st	15
2nd	12
3rd	10
4th	8
5th	6
6th	4
7th	2
8th	1

=== Boys' tournament ===
==== Team standings ====
Rank	Team	Medals				Rec	Points
Rank	Team	1st place, gold medalist(s)	2nd place, silver medalist(s)	3rd place, bronze medalist(s)	**Total**	Rec	Points
1st place, gold medalist(s)	UST						461.59
2nd place, silver medalist(s)	La Salle					1	370.50
3rd place, bronze medalist(s)	Ateneo	7	2	3	12		197
4	UE						
5	**UP**						

**Rec** - Number of new swimming records established
Event host in **boldface**

==== Awards ====
- Most Valuable Player: Phillip Joaquin Santos (Ateneo Blue Eaglets)
- Rookie of the Year: Robin Serranillo (UST Tiger Cubs)

=== Girls' tournament ===
==== Team standings ====
Rank	Team	Medals				Rec	Points
Rank	Team	1st place, gold medalist(s)	2nd place, silver medalist(s)	3rd place, bronze medalist(s)	**Total**	Rec	Points
1st place, gold medalist(s)	UST					1	419
2nd place, silver medalist(s)	**UPIS**						
3rd place, bronze medalist(s)	DLSZ						277
4	Ateneo						
5	UE						

**Rec** - Number of new swimming records established
Event host in **boldface**

==== Awards ====
- Most Valuable Player: Camille Lauren Buico (UST Junior Tigresses)
- Rookie of the Year: Aubrey Tom (UPIS Junior Lady Maroons)

== Performance sports ==
=== Cheerdance ===
The UAAP Season 82 cheerdance competition was held on November 17, 2019 at the Mall of Asia Arena in Pasay. Cheerdance competition is an exhibition event. Points for the overall championship are not awarded to the participating schools.

==== Team standings ====
Rank	Team	Order	Tumbling	Stunts	Tosses	Pyramids	Dance	Penalties	Points	Percentage
1	NU Pep Squad	8	90	81	89.5	96	369.5	4	722	90.25%
2	FEU Cheering Squad	5	91.5	76	87	93.5	362	4	706	88.25%
3	Adamson Pep Squad	6	82	72	83.5	91	342	12	658.5	82.31%
4	UST Salinggawi Dance Troupe	7	75.5	66	82	90	349.5	13	650	81.25%
5	UE Pep Squad	2	82.5	71	86.5	84.5	329.5	9	645	80.63%
6	UP Pep Squad	3	63	62	73.5	86.5	339.5	2	622.5	77.81%
7	Ateneo Blue Babble Battalion	4	66.5	55	73	77	322.5	1	593	74.13%
8	DLSU Animo Squad	1	67	50	70	75	316.5	1	577.5	72.19%

== General championship summary ==
The general champion is determined by a point system. The system gives 15 points to the champion team of a UAAP event, 12 to the runner-up, and 10 to the third placer. The following points: 8, 6, 4, 2 and 1 are given to the rest of the participating teams according to their order of finish.

=== Medals table ===
==== Collegiate division ====
Rank	Team	Gold	Silver	Bronze	Total
1	University of Santo Tomas	5	5	3	13
2	Ateneo de Manila University*	4	3	3	10
3	National University	4	2	2	8
4	University of the East	3	0	0	3
5	Far Eastern University	2	1	1	4
6	De La Salle University	1	6	5	12
7	University of the Philippines Diliman	0	2	5	7
8	Adamson University	0	0	0	0
Totals (8 entries)		19	19	19	57

* Host nation (Season host); General champions
Notes: Results are final.

==== High school division ====
Rank	Team	Gold	Silver	Bronze	Total
1	University of Santo Tomas	5	3	1	9
2	Nazareth School of National University	4	2	3	9
3	De La Salle Zobel	2	2	3	7
4	University of the East	2	0	1	3
5	Far Eastern University–Diliman	1	4	2	7
6	Adamson University	0	1	3	4
7	Ateneo de Manila University*	0	1	1	2
8	UP Integrated School	0	1	0	1
Totals (8 entries)		14	14	14	42

* Host nation (Season host); General champions
Notes: Results are final.

=== General championship tally ===
==== Collegiate division ====
		Basketball		Volleyball (beach)		Swimming		Chess		Table tennis		Badminton		Taekwondo			Judo		Fencing		Total			
Rank	Team	M	W	M	W	M	W	M	W	M	W	M	W	M	W	C	M	W	M	W	M	W	C	Overall
1	UST	12	12	15	15	10	8	12	10	15	15	6	6	10	12	8	15	12	8	8	103	98	8	209
2	La Salle	6	6	4	12	12	10	4	12	10	10	10	12	12	8	15	8	8	10	12	76	90	15	181
3	Ateneo (H)	15	4	1	10	15	15	1	8	2	12	12	15	6	4	4	10	6	12	10	74	84	4	162
4	UP	10	2	6	6	8	12	10	4	1	4	8	8	4	10	10	12	10	6	6	65	62	10	137
5	NU	1	15	10	1	—	—	8	2	12	1	15	10	15	15	12	—	—	—	—	61	44	12	117
6	FEU	8	10	12	8	—	—	15	15	4	8	—	—	2	6	6	—	—	—	—	41	47	6	94
7	UE	2	1	2	2	—	—	2	6	6	6	2	2	8	2	—	—	15	15	15	37	49	0	86
8	Adamson	4	8	8	4	—	—	6	1	8	2	4	4	—	—	—	—	—	—	—	30	19	0	49

(H) Season host; = Champion; = Runner-up; = Third place; — = No team.
Notes: Results are final.

==== High school division ====
		Basketball	Volleyball (indoor)		Swimming		Chess		Table tennis		Taekwondo	Judo		Baseball	Football	Total		
Rank	Team	B	B	G	B	G	B	G	B	G	B	B	G	B	B	B	G	Overall
1	UST	6	8	10	15	15	8	8	12	12	15	15	12	15	8	102	57	159
2	DLSZ	2	4	8	12	10	4	6	15	15	6	12	10	8	10	73	49	122
3	NSNU	15	15	15	—	—	12	15	10	—	10	—	—	10	12	84	30	114
4	FEU–D	12	12	6	—	—	10	12	—	—	12	10	8	—	15	71	26	97
5	UE	4	10	4	6	6	15	—	8	—	8	—	15	—	—	51	25	76
6	Ateneo (H)	8	2	—	10	8	2	4	—	—	4	8	6	12	6	52	18	70
7	Adamson	10	6	12	—	—	6	10	2	10	—	—	—	—	—	24	32	56
8	UPIS	1	—	2	8	12	—	—	—	6	—	—	—	—	—	9	20	29

(H) Season host; = Champion; = Runner-up; = Third place; — = No team.
Notes: Results are final.

== Broadcast notes ==
The Season 82 is the last UAAP games and final broadcast by ABS-CBN Sports, a sports division of ABS-CBN Corporation aired on S+A and Liga. Between the UAAP Games and ABS-CBN was TV broadcast partner in a past 20 years of 2 decades. However, their contract with the network's sports division expired and was left in jeopardy, due to the issue of legislative franchise renewal and the denial of the franchise, which led to the sports division's dissolution following their retrenchment on August 31, 2020. As of October 21, 2020, the league chose Cignal TV/One Sports as a new partner to air the UAAP games next season.

The final broadcasters are:

Sports commentator

- Boom Gonzalez
- Anton Roxas
- Eric Tipan
- Nikko Ramos
- Jing Jamlang (Football only)
- Mico Halili (Basketball only)
- Martin Javier (Basketball and Volleyball only)
- Synjin Reyes (Volleyball only)
- Billie Capistrano (Volleyball only)
- Carmela Tunay (Volleyball only)
- Noreen Go (Volleyball only)
- Denice Dinsay (Volleyball only)

Color commentator

- Kirk Long
- Enzo Flojo
- Marco Benitez
- Ronnie Magsanoc
- Christian Luanzon
- Bea Daez (Basketball only)
- AJ Pareja (Volleyball only)
- Mozzy Ravena (Volleyball only)
- Bea de Leon (Volleyball only)
- Nicole Tiamzon (Volleyball only)
- Martin Antonio (Volleyball only)
- Alyssa Valdez (Volleyball only)
- Michele Gumabao (Volleyball only)
- Anne Remulla-Canda (Volleyball only)
- John Vic De Guzman (Volleyball only)
- Marielle Benitez-Javellana (Football only)

== See also ==
- NCAA Season 95
