= 2019 UST Growling Tigers basketball team =

2019 UST Growling Tigers men's basketball

UAAP Season 82 runner-up

Record
- Elims rank: #4
- Final rank: #2
- 2019 record: 11–8 (8–6 elims)
- Head coach: Aldin Ayo (2nd season)
- Assistant coaches: Jino Manansala; JR Carlos
- Captain: CJ Cansino (2nd season)

The 2019 UST Growling Tigers men's basketball team represented University of Santo Tomas in the 82nd season of the University Athletic Association of the Philippines. The men's basketball tournament for the school year 2019-20 began on September 4, 2019, and the host school for the season was Ateneo de Manila University.

The Tigers returned to the playoffs for the first time since Season 78 after finishing fourth in the double round-robin eliminations with an 8–6 record. The FEU Tamaraws finished with the same win–loss record but were ranked higher due to a superior +6 quotient over UST.

They eliminated FEU in the first round of the stepladder semifinals before defeating the second-seeded UP Fighting Maroons, who held a twice-to-beat advantage, in the next round to advance to the Finals against the undefeated Ateneo Blue Eagles.

The Blue Eagles went on to sweep the Finals series to complete an unprecedented 16–0 season and cap a three-peat championship run that began in Season 80. UST, which featured nine new players on its roster, was the only team to lose to Ateneo by a single point during the season. Their first-round meeting ended in a 70–71 defeat.

Beninese center Soulémane Chabi Yo was named the season's Most Valuable Player, while former Tiger Cubs one-and-done and Mythical Team member Mark Nonoy won the Rookie of the Year award. This marked the first time in a decade that UST players won both the MVP and Rookie of the Year awards. Dylan Ababou was named MVP, while Jeric Teng won Rookie of the Year in 2009.

Rhenz Abando, a transferee from the Philippine College of Science and Technology in Pangasinan, was named Player of the Week by the UAAP Press Corps for the period of September 4–8, while team captain CJ Cansino, who had suffered a season-ending ACL injury the previous year, received the same honor for the week of October 16–20, 2019.

== Season records ==
UST averaged a winning margin of 12.8 points and a losing margin of 8.7 points.

They had a blowout win over the UE Red Warriors, defeating them 101–73 in the second round of eliminations. Their 101-point output was the highest scored by a team in the season. It eclipsed their opening day record of 95 points which was also against UE. Prior to the game, the Tigers had not scored more than 90 points since Aldin Ayo took over as head coach. It was during the first round of Season 80 when UST scored 91 points in a losing effort to also the Red Warriors on their 11th consecutive loss that dated back to the second round of Season 79.

UST made a record 49 three-point shot attempts in their opening game against UE, 15 of which were by Abando. The Tigers also have the most number of three-point field goals converted with 16, as well as the highest total field goal attempts made in a game with 95, converting also a record high 39 shots.

The team also held the most number of free throw attempts and conversions with 42 and 28 respectively. This was during their second-round game against the Adamson Falcons where both teams committed a combined total of 21 team fouls in the first quarter.

UST also recorded the fewest turnovers made in a game with 6 during their second-round match against UP .

== Roster ==
UST Growling Tigers roster
Players
Coaches

Pos.	No.	Nat.	Name	Height	Year	High School
SF	3	(Philippines)	Brent Isaac Paraiso	6'2" (1.88m)	3rd	De La Salle Santiago Zobel School
PG	5	(Philippines)	Henri Lorenzo Subido	5'9" (1.75m)	5th	De La Salle Santiago Zobel School
PG	6	(Philippines)	Mark Nonoy	5'8" (1.73m)	1st	University of Santo Tomas
PF	8	(Philippines)	Sherwin Concepcion	6'3" (1.91m)	1st	Malayan High School of Science
SG	10	(Philippines)	Rhenz Joseph Abando	6'2" (1.88m)	3rd	Bactad East National High School
C	11	(Philippines)	Enrique Caunan, Jr.	6'5" (1.96m)	5th	Colegio de San Juan de Letran
SF	13	(Philippines)	Zachary Lance Eden Huang	6'4" (1.93m)	5th	Sacred Heart School-Ateneo de Cebu
C	14	(Philippines)	Arnold Dave Ando	6'7" (2.01m)	2nd	University of San Jose–Recoletos
PF	16	(Philippines)	Nathaniel Cosejo	6'3" (1.91m)	2nd	De La Salle Santiago Zobel School
SG	17	(Philippines)	Miguel Pangilinan	6'0" (1.83m)	1st	Nazareth School of National University
SF	19	(Philippines)	Ferdinand Asuncion, Jr.	6'2" (1.88m)	1st	Chiang Kai Shek College
PG	21	(Philippines)	Alberto Bordeos, Jr.	6'0" (1.83m)	1st	La Salle Greenhills
C	23	(Benin)	Soulémane Chabi Yo	6'6" (1.98m)	2nd	Université d'Abomey-Calavi
PF	27	(Philippines)	Ira Spencer Bataller	6'4" (1.93m)	2nd	Arellano University High School
SG	30	(Philippines)	Vince Petdeo Cuajao	6'1" (1.85m)	1st	Holy Child College of Davao
SG	71	(Philippines)	Crispin John Cansino (C)	6'2" (1.88m)	2nd	University of Santo Tomas

Head coach

- (Philippines) Aldin Ayo

Assistant coach(es)

- Jino Manansala
- Rodolfo Carlos, Jr.
- Jason Misolas
- Kristoffer Co
- Napoleon Garcia
- McJour Luib
- Ruden de Vera

Strength & conditioning coach(es)

- Jose Felix Cleopas
- Philip Lee Go
- Marvin James Pangilinan

Team manager

- Jaime Lim

Legend

- (C) Team captain
- Injured

- Roster

=== Depth chart ===
Pos.	Starting 5	Bench 1	Bench 2	Bench 3
C	Chabi Yo	Ando	Caunan
PF	Bataller	Concepcion	Cosejo
SF	Paraiso	Huang	Cuajao	Asuncion
SG	Cansino	Abando	Pangilinan
PG	Subido	Nonoy	Bordeos

== Roster changes ==
Cameroonian center Steve Akomo has used up his eligibility but is ably replaced by the Beninese Soulémane Chabi Yo, a transferee from Colegio de San Lorenzo who led the Griffins to the 2017 UCBL championship.

Mario Bonleon and Season 81 team captain Marvin Lee decided to forgo their final playing year to join the commercial leagues. Bonleon announced to the team that he was not coming back due to recurring injuries. He had made his decision before the Tigers played their last game of the season. Lee was the team's second leading scorer last season behind Renzo Subido and had played long minutes in UST's preseason games but was advised by their head coach to pursue playing in the MPBL in lieu of his final year in college. His Season 81 scoring average was 14.4 points per game.

Germy Mahinay and Joshua Marcos also played in the preseason, but both decided to transfer to other schools with Mahinay going to National University and Marcos to College of Saint Benilde. Toby Agustin, who saw limited action last season also transferred to Mapúa University.

Aldin Ayo's twofold rebuilding plan to hold on to players from the UST high school program, could not be any more evident this season with the arrival of UST Tiger Cubs team member Mark Nonoy, La Union native Rhenz Abando, and Davao City rookie standout Deo Cuajao.

Nonoy himself was scouted while he was in his junior year at Hua Siong College in Iloilo. He was representing Western Visayas in the Palarong Pambansa where he scored 43 points in a game against the Northern Mindanao team. He earlier scored 41 points for Hua Siong in their championship win over Bacolod Tay Tung High School in the 2018 Iloilo Invitational 17 Under Boys Basketball tournament.

=== Subtractions ===
Pos.	No.	Nat.	Player	Height	Year	High school	Notes
C	0	(Cameroon)	Steve Cedrick Akomo	6' 9"	4th	Lycée bilingue de Fondonera	Age ineligibility
SF	4	(Philippines)	Mario Emmanuel Bonleon, Jr.	6' 3"	5th	La Salle Greenhills	Forwent final year to play in the MPBL
PG	6	(Philippines)	Dean Marvin Lee	5' 8"	5th	Far Eastern University–Diliman	Forwent final year to play in the MPBL
SG	7	(Philippines)	Joshua Miguel Marcos	6' 0"	2nd	La Salle Greenhills	Transferred to College of Saint Benilde
SG	8	(Philippines)	John Kenneth Zamora	5' 11"	3rd	Arellano University High School	Relegated to Team B
PG	10	(Philippines)	John Mark Lagumen	5' 11"	2nd	San Beda University–Rizal	Transferred to Arellano University
SG	15	(Philippines)	Toby Bryan Agustin	6' 1"	2nd	José Rizal University	Transferred to Mapúa University
C	26	(Philippines)	Germy Mahinay	6' 6"	2nd	San Beda University–Rizal	Transferred to National University

=== Additions ===
Pos.	No.	Nat.	Player	Height	Year	High school	Notes
SF	3	(Philippines)	Brent Isaac Paraiso	6' 2"	3rd	De La Salle Santiago Zobel School	Transferred from De La Salle University
PG	6	(Philippines)	Mark Nonoy	5' 8"	1st	University of Santo Tomas	Rookie
PF	8	(Philippines)	Sherwin Concepcion	6' 3"	1st	Malayan High School of Science	Promoted from Team B
SG	10	(Philippines)	Rhenz Joseph Abando	6' 2"	3rd	Bactad East National High School	Transferred from PhilCST
SG	17	(Philippines)	Miguel Pangilinan	6' 0"	1st	Nazareth School of National University	Promoted from Team B
SF	19	(Philippines)	Ferdinand Asuncion, Jr.	6' 2"	1st	Chiang Kai-shek College	Promoted from Team B
SG	21	(Philippines)	Alberto Bordeos, Jr.	6' 0"	1st	La Salle Greenhills	Rookie
C	23	(Benin)	Soulémane Chabi Yo	6' 6"	2nd	Université d'Abomey-Calavi	Transferred from Colegio de San Lorenzo
SG	30	(Philippines)	Vince Petdeo Cuajao	6' 1"	1st	Holy Child College of Davao	Rookie

=== Recruiting class ===
Name	Pos.	Height	High school	Hometown	Commit date
Mark Nonoy	PG	5' 8"	University of Santo Tomas	La Carlota, Negros Occidental	18 Feb 2019
Mark Nonoy	2019 NBTC rank: #4				
Sherwin Concepcion	PF	6' 3"	Malayan High School of Science	Tarlac City	20 Mar 2018
Sherwin Concepcion	2017 NBTC rank: #11				
Vince Petdeo Cuajao	SG	6' 1"	Holy Child College of Davao	Davao City	6 Jun 2019
Vince Petdeo Cuajao	2019 NBTC rank: N/A (Finals MVP, Davao leg)				
Sources: 1 2 3 4 5

== Coaching staff ==
Aldin Ayo went into his second year as the head coach of the Growling Tigers, but not without controversies. A rumor that originated from an anonymous tweet in April claimed that Ayo had been fired as coach of the Growling Tigers, but UST's school publication, The Varsitarian later clarified that he was actually giving up his post as consultant of the juniors' basketball program to concentrate on rebuilding the seniors' team.

This led Bonnie Garcia to step down from the seniors' coaching staff to replace Ayo in the juniors' program. Garcia is the coach of the UST Tiger Cubs basketball team that placed fifth in Season 81 on a 7–7 win–loss record.

The Varsitarian further clarified that Ayo had actually signed a three-year contract and not six years as reported last year.

Aside from Garcia, assistant coach Randy Alcantara also left Ayo's coaching staff after he was selected by the Mapúa University Cardinals senior men's basketball team in December 2018 to replace Atoy Co as their new head coach. Alcantara was the coach of Mapúa's juniors' team who had just won their third straight NCAA championship earlier in November.

Tapped to replace Garcia and Alcantara were former Arellano Baby Chiefs player JR Carlos and former captain of the Growling Tigers Jino Manansala.

Jino, the son of former Philippine Basketball Association Rookie of the Year Jimmy Manansala played under Coach Aric del Rosario alongside Cyrus Baguio, Niño Gelig, Alwyn Espiritu, Christian Luanzon and Emmerson Oreta. He is the current head coach of reigning NAASCU champions Saint Clare College of Caloocan. He has also coached the AMA University Titans and the University of Manila Hawks to the 2006 and 2010 NAASCU championships.

This season also saw a change in the team manager position with Jimi Lim of Ironcon Builders replacing Chuck Dumlao of FMR Corporation.

== Schedule and results ==
=== Preseason tournaments ===
The Filoil Preseason Cup and the PBA D-League games were aired on 5 Plus and ESPN 5.

Preseason game log

2019 Got Skills Hard to Guard tournament: 4–3
Game	Date • Time	Opponent	Result	Record	High points	High rebounds	High assists	Location
1	Jan 12 • 9:30 am	TIP Engineers	W 66–55	1–0	Abando (11)	Chabi Yo (8)		Trinity University of Asia Quezon City
2	Feb 3 • 8:30 am	Lyceum Pirates	W 74–73^{OT}	2–0	Lee (19)	Concepcion (9)	Abando (2)	Trinity University of Asia Quezon City
3	Jan 26 • 9:00 am	Trinity University Stallions	L 40–59	2–1	Mahinay (15)	Mahinay (13)		Trinity University of Asia Quezon City
4	Feb 16 • 11:30 am	STI Balagtas Olympians	W 74–60	3–1	Marcos (13)	Cosejo (9)		Lourdes School Mandaluyong
5 (Note: Arvin Marzan is still in high school and is currently playing for the UST Tiger Cubs team)	Feb 23 • 8:15 am	UP Fighting Maroons	L 66–92	3–2	Marzan (14)			Trinity University of Asia Quezon City
6	Mar 2 • 8:30 am	University of Caloocan City	W	4–2				Trinity University of Asia Quezon City
7	Mar 3 • 8:15 am	NU Bulldogs	L 52–59	4–3				Trinity University of Asia Quezon City

2019 PBA D-League Aspirants' Cup: 6–3
Game	Date • Time	Opponent	Result	Record	High points	High rebounds	High assists	Location
1	Feb 18 • 2:00 pm	Batangas-EAC Generals	W 94–70	1–0	Chabi Yo (19)	Chabi Yo (11)	Paraiso (5)	Paco Arena; Manila
2	Feb 26 • 4:00 pm	AMA University Titans	W 113–108	2–0	Chabi Yo (25)	Chabi Yo (18)		Paco Arena; Manila
3	Mar 7 • 2:00 pm	Ateneo Blue Eagles	W 112–98	3–0	Nonoy (23)	Chabi Yo (9)	Chabi Yo (2)	Ynares Sports Arena Pasig
4	Mar 19 • 4:00 pm	Benilde Blazers	W 94–82	4–0	Chabi Yo (32)	Chabi Yo (25)	Nonoy (2)	Paco Arena; Manila
5	Apr 11 • 11:00 am	Letran Knights	L 101–114	4–1	Chabi Yo (25)	Chabi Yo (11)	Chabi Yo (4)	Ynares Sports Arena Pasig
6	Apr 29 • 2:00 pm	McDavid Apparels	W 111–90	5–1	Chabi Yo (25)	Chabi Yo (15)	Lee (8)	JCSGO Gym; Quezon City
7	May 6 • 4:00 pm	Che'Lu Bar & Grill Revellers	L 80–92	5–2	Concepcion (24)			JCSGO Gym; Quezon City
8	May 16 • 4:00 pm	St. Clare College Saints	W 78–75	6–2	Paraiso (14)		Paraiso (4)	Ynares Sports Arena Pasig
9	May 23 • 2:00 pm	Enderun Colleges Titans	L 74–81	6–3	Chabi Yo (25)	Chabi Yo (14)	Nonoy (4)	JCSGO Gym; Quezon City

13th Filoil Flying V Preseason Premier Cup: 2–5
Game	Date • Time	Opponent	Result	Record	High points	High rebounds	High assists	Location
1	May 5 • 2:00 pm	De La Salle Green Archers	L 49–72	0–1	Chabi Yo (16)	Ando (30)	Chabi Yo (3)	Filoil Flying V Centre; San Juan
2	May 12 • 5:45 pm	CEU Scorpions	L 73–75	0–2	Chabi Yo (19)	Chabi Yo (10)	Tied (3)	Filoil Flying V Centre; San Juan
3	May 20 • 5:45 pm	Arellano Chiefs	W 84–73	1–2	Nonoy (29)	Tied (7)	Paraiso (5)	Filoil Flying V Centre; San Juan
4	May 21 • 4:15 pm	San Sebastian Stags	L 81–85	1–3	Abando (21)	Abando (9)	Nonoy (5)	Filoil Flying V Centre; San Juan
5 (Note: Mahloney Tarranza, Ian Herrera, Francis Batuzolele, Renzel Yongco, Carlos Sumabat, Cleg Moukengue, and Paul Manalang are all in the Team B roster)	Jun 7 • 2:00 pm	UP Fighting Maroons	L 72–89	1–4	Abando (24)	Chabi Yo (10)	Tarranza (6)	Filoil Flying V Centre; San Juan
6	Jun 10 • 12:30 pm	Mapúa Cardinals	W 91–67	2–4	Abando (23)	Chabi Yo (10)	Bataller (6)	Filoil Flying V Centre; San Juan
7	Jun 14 • 3:15 pm	San Beda Red Lions	L 73–75	2–5	Chabi Yo (24)	Chabi Yo (12)	Paraiso (7)	Filoil Flying V Centre; San Juan

2019 Breakdown Basketball Invitational Cup: 3–3
Game	Date • Time	Opponent	Result	Record	High points	High rebounds	High assists	Location
1	May 11 • 12:30 pm	New Era University Hunters	W 67–64	1–0	Cosejo (16)	Herrera (8)	Tarranza (7)	Moro Lorenzo Gym Quezon City
2	May 26 • 8:00 am	Benilde Blazers	L 58–65	1–1	Marcos (14)	Batuzolele (13)	Yongco (4)	Moro Lorenzo Gym Quezon City
3	Jun 2 • 9:30 am	TIP Engineers	Cancelled					Moro Lorenzo Gym Quezon City
4 (Note: The game was discontinued after a bench-clearing brawl between UST and Enderun)	Jun 9 • 11:00 am	Enderun Colleges Titans	W 44–39	2–1	Cosejo (8)	Tied (4)	Tied (4)	Moro Lorenzo Gym Quezon City
5	Jun 16 • 12:30 pm	Ateneo Blue Eagles	L 66–79	2–2	Sumabat (13)	Moukengue (8)	Manalang (9)	Moro Lorenzo Gym Quezon City
6	Jun 22 • 11:00 am	Fatima Phoenix	W 71–63	3–2	Chabi Yo (19)	Ando (9)	3 players (3)	Moro Lorenzo Gym Quezon City
7	Jun 23 • 8:00 am	UP Fighting Maroons	L 55–64	3–3	Marcos (10)	Moukengue (11)	Marcos (3)	Moro Lorenzo Gym Quezon City

2019 NBA China 5v5 tournament: 2–1
Game	Date • Time	Opponent	Result	Record	High points	High rebounds	High assists	Location
1	Aug 17 • 7:30 pm	DK lánqiú duì Basketball team	W 82–74	1–0	Nonoy (21)	Chabi Yo (9)	Paraiso (9)	Oriental Pearl Tower Shanghai
2	Aug 18 • 3:30 pm	Dispatch Shèngshì jié qīng	W 84–74	2–0	Chabi Yo (21)	Chabi Yo (12)	Subido (4)	Oriental Pearl Tower Shanghai
3	Aug 18 • 7:00 pm	Zhōng tiān qílín Society; Grand Finals	L 67–86	2–1	Chabi Yo (21)	Chabi Yo (15)	Nonoy (4)	Oriental Pearl Tower Shanghai

(#) Tournament seedings in parentheses.
All times are in UTC+08:00.

=== UAAP games ===
Elimination games were played in a double round-robin format. All games were aired on ABS-CBN Sports and Action and Liga. The first game of the Finals series was aired on ABS-CBN and ABS-CBN Sports and Action.

UAAP Season 82 game log

Elimination round: 8–6
Game	Date • Time	Opponent	Result	Record	High points	High rebounds	High assists	Location
1	Sep 4 • 10:30 am	UE Red Warriors	W 95–82	1–0	Abando (22)	Chabi Yo (12)	Cansino (5)	Smart Araneta Coliseum Quezon City
2	Sep 7 • 4:45 pm	UP Fighting Maroons	W 85–69	2–0	Chabi Yo (18)	Chabi Yo (18)	Subido (3)	Smart Araneta Coliseum Quezon City
3	Sep 11 • 10:45 am	Ateneo Blue Eagles	L 70–71	2–1	Chabi Yo (25)	Chabi Yo (13)	Subido (6)	Smart Araneta Coliseum Quezon City
4	Sep 15 • 2:00 pm	NU Bulldogs	W 87–74^{OT}	3–1	Chabi Yo (25)	Chabi Yo (20)	Chabi Yo (4)	Mall of Asia Arena; Pasay
5	Sep 18 • 1:15 pm	Adamson Soaring Falcons	L 71–78	3–2	Chabi Yo (17)	Chabi Yo (15)	Nonoy (3)	Mall of Asia Arena; Pasay
6	Sep 22 • 4:15 pm	FEU Tamaraws	W 82–74	4–2	Chabi Yo (21)	Chabi Yo (15)	Tied (5)	Ynares Center; Antipolo
7	Sep 28 • 2:10 pm	De La Salle Green Archers; End of R1 of eliminations	L 77–92	4–3	Paraiso (22)	Chabi Yo (14)	Subido (3)	Mall of Asia Arena; Pasay
8	Oct 5 • 4:35 pm	Ateneo Blue Eagles	L 52–66	4–4	Nonoy (18)	Chabi Yo (14)	Subido (3)	Mall of Asia Arena; Pasay
9	Oct 9 • 12:30 pm	UE Red Warriors	W 101–73	5–4	Tied (22)	Chabi Yo (14)	Nonoy (6)	Smart Araneta Coliseum Quezon City
10	Oct 13 • 4:20 pm	FEU Tamaraws	L 58–72	5–5	Paraiso (12)	Chabi Yo (15)	Subido (3)	Mall of Asia Arena; Pasay
11	Oct 16 • 4:00 pm	UP Fighting Maroons	W 84–78	6–5	Concepcion (16)	Chabi Yo (10)	Subido (5)	Mall of Asia Arena; Pasay
12	Oct 19 • 2:05 pm	NU Bulldogs	W 88–76	7–5	Chabi Yo (16)	Chabi Yo (14)	Paraiso (4)	Ynares Center; Antipolo
13	Oct 23 • 4:20 pm	De La Salle Green Archers	L 79–80	7–6	Abando (19)	Chabi Yo (17)	Nonoy (4)	Smart Araneta Coliseum Quezon City
14	Oct 26 • 4:20 pm	Adamson Soaring Falcons; End of R2 of eliminations	W 80–74	8–6	Nonoy (17)	Chabi Yo (15)	Subido (7)	Ynares Center; Antipolo

Stepladder semifinals, Rd 1: 1–0
Game	Date • Time	Seed	Opponent	Result	Series	High points	High rebounds	High assists	Location
1	Nov 6 • 4:20 pm	(#4)	(#3) FEU Tamaeaws	W 81–71	1–0 (9–6)	Chabi Yo (25)	Chabi Yo (11)	Nonoy (7)	Smart Araneta Coliseum Quezon City

Stepladder semifinals, Rd 2: 2–0
Game	Date • Time	Seed	Opponent	Result	Series	High points	High rebounds	High assists	Location
1	Nov 10 • 4:25 pm	(#4)	(#2) UP Fighting Maroons	W 89–69	1–0 (10–6)	Tied (17)	Chabi Yo (15)	Subido (12)	Smart Araneta Coliseum Quezon City
2	Nov 13 • 4:00 pm	(#4)	(#2) UP Fighting Maroons	W 68–65	2–0 (11–6)	Chabi Yo (22)	Chabi Yo (16)	Nonoy (6)	Mall of Asia Arena; Pasay

Finals: 0–2
Game	Date • Time	Seed	Opponent	Result	Series	High points	High rebounds	High assists	Location
1	Nov 16 • 4:00 pm	(#4)	(#1) Ateneo Blue Eagles	L 77–91	0–1 (11–7)	Nonoy (26)	Cansino (13)	Cansino (6)	Smart Araneta Coliseum Quezon City
2	Nov 20 • 4:00 pm	(#4)	(#1) Ateneo Blue Eagles	L 79–86	0–2 (11–8)	Abando (16)	Chabi Yo (19)	Tied (5)	Mall of Asia Arena; Pasay

(#) Tournament seedings in parentheses.
All times are in UTC+08:00.
Source: Imperium Technology

=== Postseason tournament ===
The games of the Philippine Collegiate Champions League were aired via livestreaming on Facebook and YouTube.

Postseason game log

2019 PCCL National Collegiate Championship: 1–2
Game	Date • Time	Opponent	Result	Record	High points	High rebounds	High assists	Location
1 (Note: Jamba Garing, Paul Manalang, Christian Manaytay, and Ian Herrera replaced Renzo Subido, Zach Huang, Enric Caunan, and Nat Cosejo in the roster)	Feb 8 • 2:00 pm	Letran Knights; UAAP–NCAA Challenge	W 95–65	1–0	Cansino (13)	Chabi Yo (10)	Garing (4)	Filoil Flying V Centre; San Juan
2	Feb 9 • 4:00 pm	Ateneo Blue Eagles; UAAP–NCAA Challenge	L 71–82	1–1	Abando (14)	Chabi Yo (6)	Manalang (6)	Filoil Flying V Centre; San Juan
3	Feb 15 • 1:00 pm	San Beda Red Lions; UAAP–NCAA Challenge	L 68–77	1–2	Cansino (21)	Tied (9)	Nonoy (4)	Filoil Flying V Centre; San Juan

(#) Tournament seedings in parentheses.
All times are in UTC+08:00.

== UAAP statistics ==
=== Eliminations ===
Player	GP	GS	MPG	FGM	FGA	FG%	3PM	3PA	3P%	FTM	FTA	FT%	RPG	APG	SPG	BPG	TOV	PPG
Soulémane Chabi Yo	14	14	31.3	94	182	51.6	0	8	0.0	49	70	70.0	14.7	1.3	0.6	0.9	1.5	16.9
Rhenz Abando	13	5	22.3	53	148	35.8	32	104	30.8	21	37	56.8	5.0	1.0	0.7	1.2	2.2	12.2
Mark Nonoy	14	6	20.7	42	145	29.0	26	98	26.5	34	51	66.7	3.9	2.3	0.7	0.0	2.3	10.0
Renzo Subido	14	9	22.0	38	94	40.4	20	56	35.7	19	27	70.4	2.1	3.5	0.2	0.0	1.3	8.2
Sherwin Concepcion	14	3	16.7	33	109	30.3	25	74	33.8	14	17	82.4	4.4	0.9	0.1	0.0	0.6	7.5
Brent Paraiso	14	10	20.6	34	94	36.2	19	62	30.6	6	13	46.2	4.4	1.7	0.6	0.1	2.1	6.6
CJ Cansino	14	8	17.2	31	82	37.8	13	41	31.7	10	17	58.8	4.3	1.6	0.6	0.2	1.6	6.1
Zach Huang	14	4	14.8	29	65	44.6	12	26	46.2	13	24	54.2	3.9	0.9	0.1	0.0	0.9	5.9
Dave Ando	14	1	12.5	20	46	43.5	1	2	50.0	3	6	50.0	3.1	0.6	0.1	0.4	0.3	3.1
Ira Bataller	13	9	16.8	8	37	21.6	0	6	0.0	11	21	52.4	2.9	1.1	0.1	0.0	1.5	2.1
Nat Cosejo	4	0	2.3	2	3	66.7	0	0	0.0	1	2	50.0	0.5	0.0	0.0	0.0	0.0	1.3
Deo Cuajao	11	1	5.8	5	24	20.8	3	14	21.4	0	0	0.0	1.0	0.4	0.0	0.0	0.3	1.2
Migs Pangilinan	4	0	3.1	1	1	100.0	0	0	0.0	0	0	0.0	0.8	0.0	0.0	0.0	0.0	0.5
Albert Bordeos	6	0	4.7	0	7	0.0	0	4	0.0	1	2	50.0	0.5	1.5	0.0	0.0	0.7	0.2
Enric Caunan	2	0	5.4	0	0	0.0	0	0	0.0	0	0	0.0	1.0	1.0	0.0	0.0	0.0	0.0
Junjun Asuncion	1	0	3.3	0	1	0.0	0	1	0.0	0	0	0.0	0.0	0.0	0.0	0.0	0.0	0.0
Total	14		40.4	387	1,038	37.3	151	498	30.3	184	287	64.1	49.9	15.9	3.7	2.8	15.4	79.2
Opponents	14		40.4	402	1,011	39.8	114	374	30.5	141	238	59.2	45.1	15.5	4.9	3.1	14.7	75.6

=== Playoffs ===
Player	GP	GS	MPG	FGM	FGA	FG%	3PM	3PA	3P%	FTM	FTA	FT%	RPG	APG	SPG	BPG	TOV	PPG
Soulémane Chabi Yo	5	5	32.1	35	65	53.8	0	3	0.0	18	28	64.3	14.2	1.6	1.0	0.4	1.8	17.6
Mark Nonoy	5	0	22.6	23	67	34.3	13	45	28.9	15	20	75.0	4.2	4.6	0.8	0.0	2.6	14.8
Rhenz Abando	5	1	24.4	15	42	35.7	9	29	31.0	17	27	63.0	5.8	0.0	0.6	1.8	0.6	11.2
Renzo Subido	5	5	24.6	19	53	35.8	14	46	30.4	0	1	0.0	2.2	4.8	0.4	0.0	3.2	10.4
Brent Paraiso	5	4	21.2	13	39	33.3	9	28	32.1	6	10	60.0	2.6	0.6	0.4	0.0	2.6	8.2
Sherwin Concepcion	5	0	12.3	8	27	29.6	7	23	30.4	2	2	100.0	1.6	0.8	0.0	0.0	0.4	5.0
CJ Cansino	5	5	20.4	8	32	25.0	0	8	0.0	7	8	87.5	7.8	2.8	0.6	0.2	1.2	4.6
Dave Ando	5	1	11.4	7	15	46.7	0	1	0.0	1	2	50.0	2.0	0.4	0.0	0.8	1.0	3.0
Zach Huang	5	0	13.0	4	17	23.5	1	7	14.3	6	9	66.7	3.0	0.6	0.0	0.0	1.0	3.0
Ira Bataller	5	4	17.0	2	8	25.0	1	2	50.0	0	0	0.0	2.6	1.0	0.0	0.0	1.2	1.0
Deo Cuajao	1	0	2.3	0	0	0.0	0	0	0.0	0	0	0.0	0.0	0.0	0.0	0.0	0.0	0.0
Migs Pangilinan	1	0	3.1	0	0	0.0	0	0	0.0	0	0	0.0	0.0	0.0	0.0	0.0	0.0	0.0
Total	5		40.0	134	365	36.7	54	192	28.1	72	105	68.6	46.2	17.2	3.8	3.2	17.0	78.8
Opponents	5		40.0	149	362	41.2	39	141	27.7	45	71	63.4	44.8	15.4	5.0	3.0	16.2	76.4

Legend
GP	Games played	GS	Games started	MPG	Minutes per game
FGM	Field-goal made	FGA	Field-goal attempts	FG%	Field-goal percentage
3PM	3-point field-goal made	3PA	3-point field-goal attempts	3P%	3-point field-goal percentage
FTM	Free-throw made	FTA	Free-throw attempts	FT%	Free-throw percentage
RPG	Rebounds per game	APG	Assists per game	SPG	Steals per game
BPG	Blocks per game	TOV	Turnovers per game	PPG	Points per game

Source: Imperium Technology

== Awards ==
Name	Award	Date	Ref.
Team	NBA China runners-up	18 Aug 2019	
Team	UAAP runners-up	20 Nov 2019	
Soulémane Chabi Yo	Season MVP	20 Nov 2019	
Soulémane Chabi Yo	Mythical Five	20 Nov 2019	
Mark Nonoy	Rookie of the Year	20 Nov 2019	
Rhenz Abando	Player of the Week	4–8 Sep 2019	
CJ Cansino	Player of the Week	16–20 Oct 2019	

== Players drafted into the PBA ==
Renzo Subido was drafted 24th overall in the second round of the 2019 PBA draft by the Pido Jarencio-led NorthPort Batang Pier on December 8, 2019.

Zach Huang and Enric Caunan joined the 2023 PBA draft and were selected in the fourth and eighth rounds, respectively. Huang was picked 43rd overall by the Luigi Trillo-led Meralco Bolts team, while Caunan ended up with the Johnedel Cardel-coached Terrafirma Dyip team as the 70th pick of the draft on September 17, 2013.

Year	Round	Pick	Overall	Player	PBA team
2019	2	12	24	Renzo Subido	NorthPort Batang Pier
2023	4	8	43	Zach Huang	Meralco Bolts
2023	8	1	70	Enrique Caunan	Terrafirma Dyip
