= Mark Nonoy =

Filipino basketball player

No. 24 – Terrafirma Dyip
- Position: Point guard
- League: PBA

Personal information
- Born: July 24, 2000 (age 26)
- Listed height: 5 ft 9 in (1.75 m)

Career information
- High school: UST (Manila)
- College: UST (2019); De La Salle (2022–23)
- PBA draft: 2024: 1st round, 10th overall pick
- Drafted by: Terrafirma Dyip
- Playing career: 2024–present

Career history
- 2024: Iloilo United Royals
- 2024–present: Terrafirma Dyip

Career highlights
- UAAP champion (2023); UAAP Rookie of the Year (2019); 2× PBA D-League champion (2022 Aspirants's Cup, 2023 Aspirants' Cup)

Mark Jurin Nonoy (born July 24, 2000) is a Filipino professional basketball player for the Terrafirma Dyip of the Philippine Basketball Association (PBA).

Nonoy played for University of Santo Tomas (UST) Growling Tigers and De La Salle University (DLSU) Green Archers during his college career, where he won a championship with the latter in 2023. In 2024, he turned pro after joining the Iloilo United Royals of the Maharlika Pilipinas Basketball League (MPBL) before getting drafted by and signed with Terrafirma later that year,

== College career ==
Mark Nonoy first played for the UST's high school team, the Tiger Cubs, in 2018. Upon graduation from high school, he joined the UST Growling Tigers college team for the 2019 season. In his rookie year, he won the UAAP Rookie of the Year award, but his stay in UST didn't last for long though, as he alongside Deo Cuajao transferred to De La Salle amidst UST's "Sorsogon bubble" controversy. He went on to win a championship with the Green Archers in 2023.

== Professional career ==
=== Iloilo United Royals (2024) ===
On January 28, 2024, Nonoy entered the pro scene upon joining the Iloilo United Royals of the Maharlika Pilipinas Basketball League. Mid-season, during the PBA season 49 draft, Nonoy was selected with the 10th overall pick by the Terrafirma Dyip, but due to his contractual commitments with Iloilo, he wasn't able to sign for the team immediately.

=== Terrafirma Dyip (2024–present) ===
On October 17, 2024, with his lone season in the MPBL finished, Nonoy signed with Terrafirma under a two-year deal.

== Career statistics ==
=== PBA ===
Legend
GP	Games played	MPG	Minutes per game	FG%	Field-goal percentage
3FG%	3-point field-goal percentage	4P%	4-point field-goal percentage	FT%	Free-throw percentage
RPG	Rebounds per game	APG	Assists per game	SPG	Steals per game
BPG	Blocks per game	PPG	Points per game	**127**	Career high

As of the end of 2025–26 season

==== Season-by-season averages ====
Year	Team	GP	MPG	FG%	3P%	4P%	FT%	RPG	APG	SPG	BPG	PPG
2024–25	Terrafirma	**22**	21.2	.393	**.345**	**.293**	**.725**	2.1	1.5	1.2	**.2**	11.3
2025–26	Terrafirma	7	**24.9**	**.397**	.294	.100	.654	**2.9**	**5.6**	**1.6**	—	**11.7**
Career		29	22.1	.394	.333	.255	.705	2.3	2.5	1.3	.1	11.4

=== MPBL ===
Legend
GP	Games played	GS	Games started	MPG	Minutes per game
FG%	Field-goal percentage	3P%	3-point field-goal percentage	FT%	Free-throw percentage
RPG	Rebounds per game	APG	Assists per game	SPG	Steals per game
BPG	Blocks per game	PPG	Points per game	**Bold**	Career high

==== Season-by-season averages ====
Year	Team	GP	GS	MPG	FG%	3P%	FT%	RPG	APG	SPG	BPG	PPG
2024	Iloilo	22	2	21.7	.324	.242	.719	3.4	3.4	1.6	.1	13.5
