= Kent Pastrana =

Filipino basketball player (born 2000)

Free agent

Personal information
- Born: September 5, 2000 (age 26)
- Listed height: 5 ft 7 in (1.70 m)

Career information
- High school: DMLMHS (Silay, Negros Occidental)
- College: De La Salle (2019); UST (2023–2026)

Kent Jane Pastrana is a Filipina basketball player who last played for the UST Growling Tigresses of the University Athletic Association of the Philippines (UAAP).

== Early life and education ==
Kent Pastrana was born on September 5, 2000. She took up basketball when she was in fifth grade but was initially discouraged by her elder brothers since she was the only girl among siblings.

Eventually they allowed Pastrana to commit to playing basketball leading to her recruitment for the Doña Montserrat Lopez Memorial High School in Silay, Negros Occidental. For her collegiate studies she initially attended the De La Salle University (DLSU) before transferring to the University of Santo Tomas (UST) in 2022.

== Career ==
=== Collegiate ===
==== De La Salle ====
Pastrana was set on joining DLSU, her dream school despite attempts by UST coach Haydee Ong to recruit her. Pastrana initially played for the La Salle Lady Archers in University Athletic Association of the Philippines (UAAP). She was named Rookie of the Year and part of the Mythical Team in UAAP Season 82 in 2019.

==== UST ====
However the COVID-19 pandemic disrupted the league, and Pastrana later moved to UST. She had to sat out Season 85 following her 2022 transfer.

She made her UAAP debut with the UST Golden Tigresses in Season 86 and helped the team won the championship. This disrupted the championship streak of the NU Lady Bulldogs. The team finished as runners-up in Season 87, and won the title again in Season 88 in 2025 where Pastrana was named Finals MVP. She was part of the Mythical Team throughout all seasons she played for UST.

Pastrana also played 3x3 basketball for UST winning the Seasons 86 and 88 titles. She finished her collegiate career with the 3x3 tournament in 2026.

=== National team ===
Pastrana became part of the Philippine national team in 2025. Notably omitted from the 2025 William Jones Cup roster, Pastrana debuted at the 2025 FIBA Asia Cup Division A tournament. She took part in the 2026 FIBA Women's Basketball World Cup qualifiers.

== Personal life ==
Pastrana is described as a native of either Silay or Victorias, Negros Occidental.
