= 2026 FIBA Women's Basketball World Cup qualification =

The 2026 FIBA Women's Basketball World Cup qualification process determined the 16 that will qualify for the 2026 FIBA Women's Basketball World Cup. As hosts, Germany received automatic qualification for the tournament.

== Format ==
There were two parts. 16 teams played a pre-qualifying tournament with the two winners qualifying for the qualifying tournament. The final qualifying part included 24 teams. Germany, as host, and each winner of the continental championship qualified. All other teams played in a qualifying tournament after finishing as the top teams during their regional tournament. A total of 22 teams were playing in those qualifying tournaments for the remaining eleven spots.

=== Schedule ===
Tournament	Dates
Pre-qualifying	19–25 August 2024
Qualifying	11–17 March 2026

== Qualified teams ==
Team	Qualification method	Date of qualification	Appearance(s)				Previous best performance (Note: Bold text indicates they hosted that edition.)	WR (Note: World ranking at start of tournament.)
Team	Qualification method	Date of qualification	Total	First	Last	Streak	Previous best performance	WR
Germany	Host nation	28 April 2023	2nd	1998		1	Eleventh place (1998)	11
Belgium	Winner of EuroBasket Women 2025	29 June 2025	3rd	2018	2022	3	Fourth place (2018)	5
United States	Winner of 2025 Women's AmeriCup	6 July 2025	19th	1953	2022	17	Champions (Eleven times) (Note: United States have won in 1953, 1957, 1979, 1986, 1990, 1998, 2002, 2010, 2014, 2018 and 2022.)	1
Australia	Winner of 2025 Women's Asia Cup	20 July 2025	17th	1957	2022	16	Champions (2006)	3
Nigeria	Winner of 2025 Women's Afrobasket	3 August 2025	3rd	2006	2018	1	Eighth place (2018)	8
France	Qualified through Qualifying Tournaments	14 March 2026	12th	1953	2022	7	Third place (1953)	2
Spain	Qualified through Qualifying Tournaments	14 March 2026	8th	1994	2018	1	Runners-up (2014)	6
China	Qualified through Qualifying Tournaments	15 March 2026	12th	1983	2022	12	Runners-up (1994, 2022)	4
South Korea	Qualified through Qualifying Tournaments	15 March 2026	18th	1959	2022	18	Runners-up (1967, 1979)	15
Italy	Qualified through Qualifying Tournaments	15 March 2026	6th	1967	1994	1	Fourth place (1975)	14
Mali	Qualified through Qualifying Tournaments	17 March 2026	3rd	2010	2022	2	Eleventh place (2022)	18
Czech Republic	Qualified through Qualifying Tournaments	17 March 2026	4th	2006	2014	1	Runners-up (2010)	17
Turkey	Qualified through Qualifying Tournaments	17 March 2026	3rd	2014	2018	1	Fourth place (2014)	16
Japan	Qualified through Qualifying Tournaments	17 March 2026	10th	1964	2022	5	Runners-up (1975)	10
Hungary	Qualified through Qualifying Tournaments	17 March 2026	6th	1957	1998	1	Fifth place (1957)	19
Puerto Rico	Qualified through Qualifying Tournaments	17 March 2026	3rd	2018	2022	3	Eighth place (2022)	13

== Pre-qualifying ==
16 teams entered this stage and were split into two tournaments, with the winners advancing to the next round. The tournaments were held from 19 to 25 August 2024 in Mexico City, Mexico and Kigali, Rwanda. The draw took place on 25 April 2024.

Continent	Team(s)
Africa	Senegal ^{QT} Mali (3rd); Rwanda (4th); Mozambique (5th)
Americas	Brazil ^{QT} Venezuela (6th); Argentina (7th); Mexico (8th)
Asia/Oceania	New Zealand ^{QT} South Korea (5th); Philippines (6th); Lebanon (7th)
Europe	Hungary ^{QT} Czechia (7th); Montenegro (8th); Great Britain (10th)

- ^{QT} Participated in the 2024 FIBA Women's Olympic Qualifying Tournaments
- 4th, 5th, 6th: Position at the continental championship.

== Qualifying ==
There were 24 teams, two from the first round and 22 from the continental championships in 2025. The host, Germany, and the winners of the continental championships participated in the tournament, although already qualified. The teams were split into four tournaments of six teams, with 16 teams qualifying for the final tournament. The tournaments were held from 11 to 17 March 2026, with Istanbul, Villeurbanne, San Juan and Wuhan, China as the hosts. The draw was held on 7 October 2025 at the FIBA headquarters in Mies, Switzerland.

=== Teams ===
Tournament	Team(s)
2026 FIBA Women's Basketball World Cup hosts	Germany
Two winners of Pre-Qualifying Tournaments	Czechia; Hungary
Top four of 2025 Women's Afrobasket	Mali; Nigeria; Senegal; South Sudan
Top six of 2025 FIBA Women's AmeriCup	Argentina; Brazil; Canada; Colombia; Puerto Rico; United States
Top six of 2025 FIBA Women's Asia Cup	Australia; China; Japan; South Korea; New Zealand; Philippines
Top five of EuroBasket Women 2025	Belgium; France; Italy; Spain; Turkey
