= 2023 NBTC National Finals =

Edition of PH high school basketball tournament

Tournament details
- Venue: SM Mall of Asia
- Dates: March 15–23
- Teams: 24

Final positions
- Champions: Division 1: NUNS Bullpups (3rd title); Division 2: Team Tarlac (1st title)
- Runners-up: Division 1: Fil-Nation Select-USA; Division 2: Don Bosco Dumaguete

Awards
- Most Outstanding Player: Division 1: Reinhard Jumamoy (NUNS); Division 2: Earl Sapasap (Team Tarlac)
- Finals MOP: Division 1: Reinhard Jumamoy (NUNS); Division 2: Earl Sapasap (Team Tarlac)
- Best Defensive Player: Reinhard Jumamoy (NUNS)

The 2023 NBTC National Finals was a basketball competition in the Philippines hosted by the National Basketball Training Center (NBTC) to determine the champion for the 2022–2023 NBTC League season. It involved 24 high school teams, with 12 regional teams, four representatives from the UAAP Jrs. and NCAA Jrs., and eight global squads. The finals made its return after three years. It began on March 15, 2023, and ended on March 23. Also taking place during this time was the NBTC All-Star Game and several other side events.

The NUNS Bullpups won Division 1 for the third straight year, while Team Tarlac won Division 2.

== Qualification ==
This year's format involved high school teams and clubs going through local qualifiers tournaments (LQT). For this season, 144 teams participated in the LQTs. For teams based in the NCR, the UAAP Jrs. and NCAA Jrs. tournaments are used as qualifiers. Semifinalists would get to play in the NBTC finals, as the UAAP and NCAA finals happened on the same week.

Unlike past seasons, this edition of the NBTC Finals was open to club teams. All players must be born after January 1, 2004, and must have Filipino lineage.

For the first time, the NBTC Global Games were used to determine which international teams would qualify for the finals. These were held in Canada, USA, Italy (hosting for the European region), Australia, New Zealand, and Dubai from July to November.

Regional teams via LQT
Region	Qualified	Ref.
Cebu	Sacred Heart School (SHS) – Ateneo de Cebu Landmasters	
Pampanga	Pampanga Delta	
Central Luzon	Team Tarlac	
Baguio	University of Luzon (U of Luzon)	
Cavite	Philippine Christian University (PCU)- Dasmariñas	
Kidapawan	Holy Trinity College General Santos	
Laguna	Saint Benilde International School (SBIS) Calamba	
Northern Mindanao	Level Up Team Abro Max Ballers Davao	
Quezon	Batang Tiaong San Antonio	
Visayas	Royal Star Trading Don Bosco Dumaguete	
Quezon City / Caloocan	Doc Boleros Camanava NCR	
Batangas	University of Batangas (U of Batangas) Boys	

NCR and international teams
Event	Date	Location	Vacancies	Qualified	Ref.
NCR representatives from UAAP	March 7–10, 2023	Filoil EcoOil Centre	3	UAAP semifinalist- UST Tiger Cubs UAAP semifinalist- NUNS Bullpups Ateneo Blue Eaglets	
NCR representatives from NCAA	March 6–9, 2023	San Andres Sports Complex, Manila	1	NCAA semifinalist- ~~San Beda Red Cubs~~ (Note: San Beda was replaced by Ateneo as San Beda begged off) NCAA semifinalist- Mapua Red Robins	
Global teams			8	USA- Team United USA- Fil-Nation Select Canada- Toronto; Canada- Winnipeg; Australia- Homegrown Crusaders; New Zealand- Pinoy Mavs; Europe- Rome Elite Italy; UAE- Dubai Patriots	

San Beda was replaced by Ateneo as San Beda begged off. At the end of qualifying, 24 teams remained.

== Tournament format ==
All teams played in the Super 24 round. This determined the divisions they would play in, with winners playing in Division 1, while losers playing in Division 2. Each division will then be placed into four groups of three and play a round-robin (also known as the Magic 12). Top teams then advance to the semis and then the Division 1 and 2 championships. At the end of the tournament, a player would receive the Most Outstanding Player award, which for the first time was named after former NBTC tournament commissioner Ato Badolato.

== Seeding round ==
15 March 2023
SHS – Ateneo de Cebu	99–54	Rome Elite Italy	Mall of Asia Arena, Pasay
UST	66–62	Team Tarlac	Mall of Asia Arena, Pasay
Winnipeg	86–72	Team United USA	Mall of Asia Arena, Pasay
Toronto	83–63	SBIS	Mall of Asia Arena, Pasay
Fil-Am Nation Select	116–60	Doc Boleros	Mall of Asia Arena, Pasay
NUNS	93–68	PCU - Dasmariñas	Mall of Asia Arena, Pasay
Batang Tiaong	64–41	Ateneo	Mall of Asia Arena, Pasay
Pinoy Mavs	83–79	Holy Trinity	Mall of Asia Arena, Pasay
Team Abro	111–74	U of Luzon	Mall of Asia Arena, Pasay
Dubai Patriots	66–65	U of Batangas	Mall of Asia Arena, Pasay
Mapua	92–85	Don Bosco- Dumaguete	Mall of Asia Arena, Pasay
Pampanga Delta	84–81	Homegrown Australia	Mall of Asia Arena, Pasay

== Magic 12 ==
=== Division 1 ===
==== Pool A ====
Team	Pld	W	L
NUNS	3	2	0
Pampanga Delta	3	1	1
Team Abro	3	0	2

March 16, 2023
Pampanga Delta	94–63	Team Abro
NUNS	89–71	Team Abro
March 17, 2023
NUNS	94–52	Pampanga Delta

==== Pool B ====
Team	Pld	W	L
UST	3	2	0
Toronto	3	1	1
Dubai Patriots	3	0	2

March 16, 2023
Toronto	70–63	Dubai Patriots
UST	77–47	Dubai Patriots
March 17, 2023
UST	66–65	Toronto

==== Pool C ====
Team	Pld	W	L
SHS – Ateneo de Cebu	3	2	0
Mapua	3	1	1
Winnipeg	3	0	2

March 16, 2023
Mapua	81–77	Winnipeg
SHS – Ateneo de Cebu	100–79	Winnipeg
March 17, 2023
Mapua	75–90	SHS – Ateneo de Cebu

==== Pool D ====
Team	Pld	W	L
Fil-Nation Select	3	2	0
Batang Tiaong	3	1	1
Pinoy Mavs	3	0	2

March 16, 2023
Batang Tiaong	67–53	Pinoy Mavs
Fil-Nation Select	93–61	Pinoy Mavs
March 17, 2023
Batang Tiaong	79–91	Fil-Nation Select

=== Division 2 ===
==== Pool A ====
Team	Pld	W	L
Homegrown Australia	3	2	0
PCU - Dasmariñas	3	1	1
U of Luzon	3	0	2

March 16, 2023
Homegrown Australia	96–75	U of Luzon
PCU - Dasmariñas	104–71	U of Luzon
March 17, 2023
Homegrown Australia	75–72	PCU - Dasmariñas

==== Pool B ====
Team	Pld	W	L
Team Tarlac	3	2	0
SBIS	3	1	1
U of Batangas	3	0	2

March 16, 2023
Team Tarlac	96–56	U of Batangas
SBIS	79–78	U of Batangas
March 17, 2013
Team Tarlac	78–60	SBIS

==== Pool C ====
Team	Pld	W	L
Don Bosco	3	2	0
Team United	3	1	1
Rome Elite	3	0	2

March 16, 2023
Don Bosco	98–91	Team United
Rome Elite	53–85	Team United
March 17, 2023
Don Bosco	95–58	Rome Elite

==== Pool D ====
Team	Pld	W	L
Ateneo	3	2	0
Doc Boleros	3	1	1
Holy Trinity	3	0	2

March 16, 2023
Doc Boleros	66–61	Holy Trinity
Ateneo	77–58	Holy Trinity
March 17, 2023
Ateneo	74–65	Doc Boleros

== Knockout stage ==
=== Division 1 ===
Semifinals
1	UST	66
4	Fil-Nation Select	74
3	SHS – Ateneo de Cebu	90
2	NUNS	91

Finals
Fil-Nation Select	88
NUNS	77

==== Finals ====
NBTC Facebook page & Smart Sports

March 19
5:00 pm

Recap

Fil-Nation Select 64, NUNS 75
Pts: Jason Mandaquit 18	Pts: RJ Colonia 23

Mall of Asia Arena, Pasay

=== Division 2 ===
Semifinals
1	Team Tarlac	86
4	Ateneo	77
3	Don Bosco	82
2	Homegrown Australia	58

Finals
Team Tarlac	86
Don Bosco	84

==== Finals ====
NBTC Facebook page & Smart Sports

March 19
3:30 pm

Recap

Team Tarlac 86, Don Bosco 84
Pts: Kit Bonus 21	Pts: MJ Hendric Vailoces

Mall of Asia Arena, Pasay

== All-Star Game ==
=== Selection ===
The National Basketball Training Center selected and ranked 24 of the best high school prospects in the NCAA and UAAP juniors, and CESAFI high school tournament. They were added to the lineups of Team Heart and Team Hustle. On March 7, 2023, Jared Bahay became the first non-UAAP and non-NCAA player to be ranked #1. He and Luis Pablo (ranked #2) led Team Heart and Team Hustle, respectively. 16-year old Kieffer Alas was selected as NBTC's youngest-ever All-Star.

2024 NBTC All-Stars
Rank	Player	League	Team
#1	Jared Bahay	CESAFI	SHS – Ateneo
#2	Luis Pablo	NCAA	LSGH
#3	Reinhard Jumamoy	UAAP	NUNS
#4	Andy Gemao	NCAA	Letran
#5	Seven Gagate	NCAA	LSGH
#6	Kristian Porter	UAAP	Ateneo
#7	Rhyle Melencio	UAAP	DLSZ
#8	Matthew Rubico	NCAA	LPU
#9	Peter Rosillo	UAAP	Adamson
#10	Chris Hubilla	NCAA	San Beda
#11	Amiel Acido	NCAA	Perpetual
#12	Lebron Nieto	UAAP	Ateneo
#13	Janrey Pasaol	UAAP	FEU
#14	Kobe Demisana	UAAP	UPIS
#15	SJ Moore	NCAA	Arellano
#16	Jonathan Manalili	NCAA	Letran
#17	RJ Colonia	UAAP	NUNS
#18	Kieffer Alas	UAAP	DLSZ
#19	Mark Llemit	UAAP	UST
#20	Andrei Dungo	NCAA	San Beda
#21	Raffy Celis	CESAFI	SHS – Ateneo
#22	Veejay Pre	UAAP	FEU
#23	Mat Edding	UAAP	FEU
#24	Jonas Napalang	UAAP	FEU
Additions
Name		Team	
Lorence dela Cruz		Winnipeg	
Caelum Harris		Fil-Nation Select	
John Morales		Batang Tiaong	
Michael Asoro		SHS – Ateneo	
Jacob Bayla		Fil-Nation Select	
Jason Mandaquit		Fil-Nation Select	
Vhoris Marasigan		Batang Tiaong	

=== Lineups ===
Team Heart
Player	Team
Starters
Jared Bahay	SHS – Ateneo
Chris Hubilla	San Beda
Jonas Napalang	FEU
Mark Llemit	UST
Seven Gagate	LSGH
Reserves
Veejay Pre	FEU
Mat Edding	FEU
Jason Mandaquit	Fil-Am Nation Select
Jonathan Manalili	Letran
RJ Colonia	NUNS
Lebron Nieto	Ateneo
Matthew Rubico	LPU
Rhyle Melencio	DLSZ
Jacob Bayla	Fil-Am Nation Select
Michael Asoro	SHS – Ateneo
Vhoris Marasigan	Batang Tiaong
Head coach: TY Tang (CSB)

Team Hustle
Player	Team
Starters
Kieffer Alas	DLSZ
Reinhard Jumamoy	NUNS
Amiel Acido	Perpetual
SJ Moore	Arellano
Kristian Porter	Ateneo
Reserves
Luis Pablo	LSGH
Andy Gemao	Letran
Caelum Harris	Fil-Am Nation Select
Raffy Celis	SHS – Ateneo
Peter Rosillo	Adamson
Janrey Pasaol	FEU
Kobe Demisana	UPIS
Andrei Dungo	San Beda
John Morales	Batang Tiaong
Lorence dela Cruz	Winnipeg
Head coach: Cholo Villanueva (LSGH)

=== Game ===
NBTC Facebook page & Smart Sports

March 19
1:30 pm

Recap

Team Heart 108, Team Hustle 91
Pts: Moore 19	Pts: Hubilla 27

Mall of Asia Arena, Pasay

=== Other side events ===
- Skills challenge: Kristian Porter
- Three-Point Shootout: John Rex Villanueva
- Slam Dunk Contest: Lorence dela Cruz

== Awards ==
=== Division 1 ===
- Ato Badolato Most Outstanding Player: Reinhard Jumamoy (NUNS)
- Finals Most Outstanding Player: Reinhard Jumamoy (NUNS)
- Best Defensive Player: Eian Lowe (Fil-Am Nation Select)
- Mythical Five:

Division 1 Mythical Five
Name	Team
Reinhard Jumamoy	Nazareth School of National University Bullpups
Jason Mandaquit	Fil-Nation Select
RJ Colonia	Nazareth School of National University Bullpups
Jared Bahay	SHS – Ateneo de Cebu Landmasters
Raffy Celis	SHS – Ateneo de Cebu Landmasters

=== Division 2 ===
- Ato Badolato Most Outstanding Player: Earl Sapasap (Team Tarlac)
- Finals Most Outstanding Player: Earl Sapasap (Team Tarlac)
- Mythical Five:

Division 2 Mythical Five
Name	Team
Earl Sapasap	Team Tarlac
Matthew Jucom	Don Bosco
Lebron Nieto	Ateneo Blue Eaglets
Kaden Pulutua	Homegrown Australia Crusaders
Sean Bondoc	Doc Boleros NCR
