= 2019 NBTC National Finals =

Edition of PH high school basketball tournament

Tournament details
- Venue: SM Mall of Asia
- Dates: March 18–24
- Teams: 32

Final positions
- Champions: Division 1: NUNS Bullpups (2nd title); Division 2: St. Augustine (1st title)
- Runners-up: Division 1: LSGH Greenies; Division 2: LPU

Awards
- Most Outstanding Player: Division 1: Jalen Green (FilAm Sports)
- Finals MOP: Division 1: Carl Tamayo (NUNS); Division 2: Jiam Quiambao (St. Augustine)
- Best Defensive Player: Division 1: Tony Ynot (San Beda); Division 2: Jolo Manansala (St. Augustine)

The 2019 NBTC National Finals was a basketball competition in the Philippines hosted by the National Basketball Training Center (NBTC) to determine the champion for the 2018–2019 NBTC League season. It involved 32 high school teams, with 16 regional teams, eight representatives from the NCR, and six global squads. It began on March 18, 2019, and ended on March 24. Also taking place during this time was the NBTC All-Star Game and several other side events.

The NUNS Bullpups became the first back-to-back champions in tournament history as they won Division 1. In Division 2, St. Augustine Institute won their first NBTC title.

== Qualification ==
This year's format involved high school teams representing 105 cities going through city championships. Winners of those city championships would compete in regional championships, with the regional champions moving to the National Finals. For teams based in the NCR, the UAAP Jrs., NCAA Jrs., and Metro Manila Basketball League (MMBL) tournaments are used as qualifiers, with the winners and first runner-ups of those tournaments getting to play in the National Finals. Six international teams joined this year's tournament.

Regional teams
Region	Vacancies	Qualified	Ref.
Luzon	8	University of Baguio; Lyceum – Cavite; Perpetual Help JONELTA; Sto. Domingo National High School; Narvacan Central National High School; Isabela Colleges; St. Augustine Institute; Calayan Educational Foundation Inc.	
Visayas	6	Southwestern University PHINMA; University of San Jose–Recoletos; Sta. Clarita International School; ~~STI–West Negros University~~ (Note: STI-West Negros was replaced by First City Providential College) First City Providential College; St. Louis School of Don Bosco; Dolores National High School	
Mindanao	4	Southern Philippine Colleges; St. Mary’s College of Tagum; Holy Trinity College; Zamboanga del Sur National High School	

NCR and international teams
Event	Date	Location	Vacancies	Qualified	Ref.
NCR representatives from UAAP	February 18–22, 2019	Filoil EcoOil Centre	2	UAAP winner - NUNS Bullpups UAAP first runner-up - Ateneo Blue Eaglets	
NCR representatives from NCAA	November 6–16, 2019	Mall of Asia Arena, Pasay	2	NCAA winner - Mapua Red Robins NCAA first runner-up - LSGH Greenies	
NCR representatives from MMBL	February 11, 2019	San Beda gym	2	MMBL winner - San Beda Red Cubs MMBL first runner-up - Letran Squires	
Wildcards			2	FEU-D Baby Tamaraws Hope Christian High School	
Global teams			6	USA- Fil-Am Sports; Canada- Durham Crossover; Canada- Top Flight Hoops Vancouver; Australia- AusPinoy; New Zealand- Camp David; Europe- Italy Europe Proudly Pinoy	

== Tournament format ==
The tournament kicked off with the Seeding Round, with the first elimination round taking place the following day. Winners from the UAAP, NCAA, NBTC Cebu, and MMBL were given the first eight seeds. Top-ranked regional champions were given the last eight seeds. This left the international teams, wildcards, and other regional champions to position themselves. In the 9-16 seeding games, winning teams would get to take on teams 21-24, while losers would take on the 17th to 20th seeds. In the 25-32 seeding games, winning teams would take on seeds 5-8, while losers would have to face the top four seeds of the tournament. From there on, every match was a do-or-die situation for the teams, with knockout rounds in the Super 32, Supreme 16, Fantastic 8, Fearless Four, and the Finals.

== Seeding round ==
18 March 2019
#9 Italy Europe	59–68	#16 Hope Christian	Mall of Asia Arena, Pasay
#10 FEU-D	66–69	#15 Durham Crossover	Mall of Asia Arena, Pasay
#11 Top Flight	71–84	#14 Camp David	Mall of Asia Arena, Pasay
#12 FilAm Sports	78–45	#13 AusPinoy	Mall of Asia Arena, Pasay
#25 Narvacan National	80–74	#32 Isabela Colleges	Mall of Asia Arena, Pasay
#26 Sta. Clarita	99–88	#31 ZDSNHS	Mall of Asia Arena, Pasay
#27 U of Baguio	68–56	#30 Dolores National	Mall of Asia Arena, Pasay
#28 Holy Trinity	71–74	#29 LPU	Mall of Asia Arena, Pasay

== Tournament bracket ==
=== Division I ===
Super 32
1	NUNS	135
32	Isabela Colleges	45
17	CEFI	69
16	Italy Europe	63
9	Hope Christian	71
24	Sto. Domingo	50
25	Narvacan National	71
8	Letran	86
5	Ateneo	86
28	LPU	84
21	Perpetual JONELTA	55
12	FilAm Sports	86
13	AusPinoy	67
20	Southern Philippines	69
29	Holy Trinity	83
4	San Beda	111
3	Southwestern	103
30	Dolores National	49
19	St. Mary's	68
14	Top Flight	72
11	Camp David	80
22	SLS Don Bosco	77
27	U of Baguio	37
6	LSGH	95
7	USJ–R	75
26	Sta. Clarita	89
23	FCPC	82
10	Durham Crossover	85
15	FEU-D	90
18	St. Augustine	86
31	ZDSNHS	46
2	Mapua	54

Supreme 16
1	NUNS	120
17	CEFI	56
9	Hope Christian	57
8	Letran	60
5	Ateneo	67
12	FilAmSports	90
20	Southern Philippines	56
4	San Beda	99
3	Southwestern	81
14	Top Flight	83
11	Camp David	80
6	LSGH	102
26	Sta. Clarita	75
10	Durham Crossover	109
15	FEU-D	67
2	Mapua	58

Quarterfinals
1	NUNS	96
8	Letran	71
12	FilAm Sports	91
4	San Beda	97
14	Top Flight	69
6	LSGH	99
10	Durham Crossover	84
15	FEU-D	87

Fearless Four
1	NUNS	91
4	San Beda	90
6	LSGH	87
15	FEU-D	77

Finals
1	NUNS	95
6	LSGH	83

==== Finals ====
ESPN5

March 24
5:00 pm

Recap

LSGH 83, NUNS 95
Scoring by quarter: 22–21, 41–50, 64–72, 83–95
Pts: Inand Fornilos 20	Pts: Carl Tamayo 18

Mall of Asia Arena, Pasay

=== Division II ===
Supreme 16
1	SLS Don Bosco	75
16	U of Baguio	60
8	AusPinoy	66
9	Holy Trinity	68
5	St. Mary's	75
12	Dolores National	42
4	Perpetual JONELTA	69
13	LPU	80
6	Italy Europe	83
11	Isabela Colleges	80
3	Sto. Domingo	72
14	Narvacan National	62
7	ZDSNHS	47
10	St. Augustine	83
2	FCPC	75
15	USJ–R	50

Fantastic Eight
1	SLS Don Bosco	70
9	Holy Trinity	79
5	St. Mary's	61
13	LPU	93
6	Italy Europe	83
3	Sto. Domingo	75
10	St. Augustine	82
2	FCPC	74

Fearless Four
9	Holy Trinity	94
13	LPU	114
6	Italy Europe	74
10	St. Augustine	88

Final
13	LPU	90
10	St. Augustine	91

==== Finals ====
ESPN5

March 24
3:00 pm

Recap

St. Augustine 91, LPU 90
Scoring by quarter: 19–17, 39–42, 61–72, 91–90
Pts: Jiam Quiambao 28	Pts: Jae Omandac 22

Mall of Asia Arena, Pasay

== All-Star Game ==
=== Selection ===
The National Basketball Training Center selected and ranked 24 of the best high school prospects in the NCAA and UAAP juniors, and CESAFI high school tournament. The rankings would be shown weekly on the NBTC's online show National Basketball Training Center 24, which was shown on the NBTC's Facebook page and hosted by Kiefer Ravena and Mikee Reyes.

This year saw Kai Sotto from the UAAP Jrs and Joel Cagulangan from the NCAA Jrs take the top two spots on the rankings. Cagulangan and Sotto led Team Heart and Team Hustle, respectively. They would get to pick their teammates through a draft. They along with Jalen Green and six other players from international teams were added to the lineups of Team Heart and Team Hustle.

2019 NBTC All-Stars
Rank	Player	League	Team
#1	Kai Sotto	UAAP	Ateneo
#2	Joel Cagulangan^{INJ1}	NCAA	LSGH
#3	Carl Tamayo	UAAP	NUNS
#4	Mark Nonoy	UAAP	UST
#5	Gerry Abadiano	UAAP	NUNS
#6	RJ Abarrientos	UAAP	FEU-D
#7	Harvey Pagsanjan	MMBL	Hope Christian
#8	Clint Escamis^{INJ2}	NCAA	Mapua
#9	Aaron Fermin	NCAA	Arellano
#10	Terrence Fortea	UAAP	NUNS
#11	Forthsky Padrigao	UAAP	Ateneo
#12	Paolo Hernandez	NCAA	Mapua
#13	Inand Fornilos	NCAA	LSGH
#14	Joshua Yerro	NBTC Cebu	UV
#15	Joem Sabandal	UAAP	Adamson
#16	Dan Arches	NCAA	Mapua
#17	John Amores	NCAA	JRU
#18	Mac Guadana	NCAA	LPU
#19	Bismarck Lina	UAAP	UST
#20	Joshua David	NCAA	LSGH
#21	Kevin Quiambao	UAAP	NUNS
#22	Jonnel Policarpio	NCAA	Mapua
#23	Geo Chiu	UAAP	Ateneo
#24	Rafael Go	MMBL	Chiang Kai Shek
Additions
Name		Team	
Jalen Green		Fil-Am Sports	
Jeron Artest		Fil-Am Sports	
Kai Ballungay		Fil-Am Sports	
Brandon Wilson		Fil-Am Sports	
Tyler Garcia		Durham Crossover	
Jasper Rentoy		AusPinoy	
Adam Doria^{REP1}		Adamson	
Tony Ynot^{REP2}		San Beda	

^INJ1Joel Cagulangan was unable to play due to a right ankle injury.
^INJ2 Clint Escamis was unable to play due to a right ACL tear.
^REP1 Adam Doria was selected as Joel Cagulangan's replacement.
^REP2 Tony Ynot was selected as Clint Escamis's replacement.

=== Lineups ===
Team Heart
Player	Team
Starters
Jalen Green	FilAm Sports
Harvey Pagsanjan	Hope Christian
Jeron Artest	FilAm Sports
Joem Sabandal	Adamson
Carl Tamayo	NUNS
Reserves
Inand Fornilos	LSGH
Joshua David	LSGH
Aaron Fermin	Arellano
Paolo Hernandez	Mapua
Dan Arches	Mapua
Rafael Go	Chiang Kai Shek
Mac Guadana	LPU
Kai Ballungay	FilAm Sports
Joshua Yerro	UV
Adam Doria	Adamson
Head coach: Charles Tiu (Mighty Sports)

Team Hustle
Player	Team
Starters
RJ Abarrientos	FEU-D
Forthsky Padrigao	Ateneo
Mark Nonoy	UST
Bismarck Lina	UST
Kai Sotto	Ateneo
Reserves
Geo Chiu	Ateneo
Brandon Wilson	FilAm Sports
Kevin Quiambao	NUNS
Gerry Abadiano	NUNS
Terrence Fortea	NUNS
Jonnel Policarpio	Mapua
John Amores	JRU
Tony Ynot	San Beda
Jasper Rentoy	AusPinoy
Tyler Garcia	Top Flight
Head coach: Chris Gavina (Rain or Shine)

=== Game ===
ESPN5

March 23
3:00 pm

Recap

Team Heart 86, Team Hustle 94
Pts: Green 19	Pts: Nonoy 23

Mall of Asia Arena, Pasay

=== Other side events ===
- Skills challenge: Jasper Rentoy
- Three-Point Shootout: John Erolon
- Slam Dunk Contest: Jalen Green and David Carlos

== Awards ==
=== Division 1 ===
- Most Outstanding Player: Jalen Green (FilAm Sports)
- Finals Most Outstanding Player: Carl Tamayo (NUNS)
- Best Defensive Player: Tony Ynot (San Beda)
- Mythical Five:

Division 1 Mythical Five
Name	Team
Terrence Fortea	Nazareth School of National University Bullpups
Gerry Abadiano	Nazareth School of National University Bullpups
Joshua David	LSGH Greenies
RJ Abarrientos	FEU-D Baby Tamaraws
Rhayyan Amsali	San Beda Red Cubs

=== Division 2 ===
- Finals Most Outstanding Player: Jiam Quiambao (St. Augustine)
- Defensive Player of the Year Jolo Manansala (St. Augustine)
- Mythical Five:

Division 2 Mythical Five
Name	Team
Jiam Quiambao	St. Augustine
Mac Guadana	Lyceum – Cavite
John Barba	Lyceum – Cavite
Ednor Akad	Holy Trinity College
Chiolo Anonuevo	Italy Europe Proudly Pinoy
