= 2024 NBTC National Finals =

Edition of PH high school basketball tournament

Tournament details
- Venue: SM Mall of Asia
- Dates: March 18–24
- Teams: 32

Final positions
- Champions: Division 1: Fil-Am Nation Select-USA (1st title); Division 2: Top Flight Sports-Canada West (1st title)
- Runners-up: Division 1: Adamson Baby Falcons; Division 2: Eco Green Technology Makati

Awards
- Most Outstanding Player: Division 1: Terrence Hill Jr. (Fil-Am Nation); Division 2: Allen Vergara (Top Flight)
- Finals MOP: Division 1: Terrence Hill Jr. (Fil-Am Nation); Division 2: Allen Vergara (Top Flight)
- Best Defensive Players: Division 1: Eian Lowe (Fil-Am Nation); Division 2: John Carl Catayong (PCU-Dasma)

The 2024 NBTC National Finals was a basketball competition in the Philippines hosted by the National Basketball Training Center (NBTC) to determine the champion for the 2023–2024 NBTC League season. It involved 32 high school and club teams, with 16 regional teams, two representatives from the National Capital Region (NCR), two wildcard entries, and seven global squads. It began on March 18, 2024, and ended on March 24. Also taking place during this time was the NBTC All-Star Game and several other side events.

For the first time since international teams started participating in the NBTC National Finals in 2016, international teams won both Division 1 & Division 2 titles, with Fil-Am Nation Select-USA winning Division 1 and Top Flight Sports-Canada West winning Division 2.

== Qualification ==
Its current format involves high school teams and clubs going through local city qualifiers, then on to the regional championships. There are four regionals: North Luzon, South Luzon, Visayas, and Mindanao. Four spots from each region are contested, for a total of 16 teams. For this season, 68 teams participated in the local city qualifiers. For teams based in the NCR, the UAAP Jrs. and NCAA Jrs. tournaments are used as qualifiers. The winner of the CESAFI in Visayas also qualifies for the national finals.

Event	Date	Location	Vacancies	Qualified	Ref.
CESAFI champion	December 13, 2023	Cebu City Coliseum	1	Sacred Heart School (SHS)– Ateneo de Cebu Magis Eagles	
North Luzon regionals	January 18–21, 2024	Ilocos Norte Centennial Arena	4	CAMANAVA- Yengskivel Sportswear Pangasinan- PHILCST-Calasiao; ~~Pampanga- Pampanga Lanterns~~ (Note: Pampanga Delta was replaced by Tarlac PPG.) Tarlac PPG; Bulacan 1 San Rafael	
Mindanao regionals	February 1–4, 2024	Sarangani Sports Training Center	4	Davao- Toyomoto Auto Supply Xavier-Ateneo de Cagayan University-Sealcor; Davao City- Bullet Customs Brokerage-Prime Bistro; SOCCSKSARGEN- Notre Dame of Midsayap College (NDMC)	
Visayas regionals	February 15–18, 2024	Nolita Au Court Bacolod Tay Tung High School	4	Cebu- KHALIFA-University of San Jose-Recoletos Iloilo- St. Robert's International College (SRIC) Elite Lab; Dumaguete City- Don Bosco Greywolves; Central Negros- Trinity-Davies Paint/El Tzino	
South Luzon	February 29–March 3, 2024	Quezon Convention Center	4	Quezon- Batang Tiaong Cavite- St. Jude College Dasmariñas; Cavite- PCU-Dasma; Albay- One Media TV48-Naga	
NCR representatives from UAAP	January 31–February 11, 2024	Filoil EcoOil Centre	2	UAAP champion- Adamson Baby Falcons UAAP runner-up- NUNS Bullpups	
NCR representatives from NCAA	March 10–23, 2024	Filoil EcoOil Centre	2	NCAA semifinalist- San Sebastian Staglets NCAA semifinalist- Mapua Red Robins	
NCR qualifiers	February 18–March 15, 2024	MWSS Sports Center	2	EZ Jersey x Yurich x Arellano University Makati- Eco Green Technology	
Wildcards	March 14–16, 2024	Philsports Arena	2	UST Tiger Cubs UE Junior Warriors	
Global teams			7	USA- Fil-Am Nation Select Crossover-Canada East; Top Flight Sports-Canada West; Australia- Homegrown Basketball; New Zealand- Triple Threat Basketball; FilCom-Italy; UK- Fil-Euro Nation Select	

Pampanga Delta was replaced by Tarlac PPG.

== Tournament format ==
32 teams played in the Super 32, where they determine which division they will play in, with the winners progressing to Division 1 and the losers moving to Division 2.

From there, the knockout phase begins with the Supreme 16, the Fantastic Eight, and the Fearless Four. Winners of the semifinals then advance to the Division 1 and 2 championships.

== Seeding round ==
18 March 2024
Sacred Heart School – Ateneo de Cebu	64–76	Bulacan 1 San Rafael	Mall of Asia Arena, Pasay
Crossover-Canada	73–83	Davao City- Bullet Customs	Mall of Asia Arena, Pasay
New Zealand- Triple Threat	60–56	Central Negros- Trinity	Mall of Asia Arena, Pasay
Fil-Euro Nation Select	73–78	One Media TV48-Naga	Mall of Asia Arena, Pasay
Fil-Am Nation Select	106–51	PCU-Dasma	Mall of Asia Arena, Pasay
FilCom-Italy	88–108	PPG Tarlac	Mall of Asia Arena, Pasay
Top Flight Sports-Canada	80–75	Notre Dame of Midsayap (NDMC)	Mall of Asia Arena, Pasay
Homegrown Australia	81–95	Don Bosco	Mall of Asia Arena, Pasay
19 March 2024
San Sebastian	106–52	FilCom Italy	One E-Com Center
NUNS	100–61	Fil-Euro Nation Select	One E-Com Center
SRIC	65–72	Fil-Am Nation Select	One E-Com Center
Trinity	46–85	Mapua	One E-Com Center
1 San Rafael	92–67	Eco Green	One E-Com Center
Customs	72–68	Arellano	One E-Com Center
AdCU	55–62	Top Flight Canada	One E-Com Center
Yengskivel	80–77	Homegrown Australia	One E-Com Center
Batang Tiaong	61–57	SHS – Ateneo de Cebu	Mall of Asia Arena, Pasay
PCU-Dasma	83–86	Toyomoto Auto Supply	Mall of Asia Arena, Pasay
One Media TV48	76–57	PHILCST-Calasiao	Mall of Asia Arena, Pasay
PPG Tarlac	91–79	St. Jude–Dasmariñas	Mall of Asia Arena, Pasay
Notre Dame of Midsayap (NDMC)	54–69	Adamson	Mall of Asia Arena, Pasay
UST	83–68	Triple Threat NZ	Mall of Asia Arena, Pasay
Don Bosco	44–99	UE	Mall of Asia Arena, Pasay
KHALIFA	83–66	Crossover Canada	Mall of Asia Arena, Pasay

== Knockout phase ==
=== Division 1 ===
Supreme 16

March 20

Fantastic 8

March 21

Fearless Four

March 23

Final

1
Adamson
65

16
UE
57

Adamson
88

Yengskivel
77

8
AdCU
70

9
Yengskivel
78

Adamson
70

Mapua
65

5
Mapua
63

12
Customs
58

Mapua
71

UST
63

4
UST
85

13
Crossover
60

Adamson
71

FilNation USA
79

6
San Sebastian
71

11
1 San Rafael
69

San Sebastian
66

Batang Tiaong
80

3
PPG Tarlac
64

14
Batang Tiaong
80

Batang Tiaong
72

FilNation USA
81

7
NUNS
64

10
FilNation USA
81

FilNation USA
95

One Media TV48
63

2
One Media TV48
68

15
Toyomoto
59

==== Finals ====
NBTC Facebook page & Smart Sports

March 24
5:00 pm

Recap

Adamson 71, Fil-Am Nation 79
Pts: Justine Garcia 20	Pts: Andy Gemao 16

Mall of Asia Arena, Pasay

=== Division 2 ===
Supreme 16

March 20

Fantastic 8

Fearless Four

Final

1
NDMC
67

16
Don Bosco
73

Don Bosco
66

Top Flight
83

8
Top Flight Canada
87

9
Homegrown Australia
79

Top Flight
87

Arellano
84

5
Trinity
68

12
Arellano
83

Arellano
83

KHALIFA
81

4
Triple Threat NZ
50

13
KHALIFA
79

Top Flight
95

Eco Green
93

6
FilCom
64

11
Eco Green
95

Eco Green
81

St. Jude
75

3
St. Jude
70

14
SHS – Ateneo de Cebu
65

Eco Green
95

PCU-Dasma
82

7
Fil-Euro
79

10
SRIC
91

SRIC
90

PCU-Dasma
93

2
PhilCST
66

15
PCU-Dasma
87

==== Finals ====
NBTC Facebook page & Smart Sports

March 24
3:30 pm

Recap

Top Flight 95, Eco Green 93
Pts: Ryan Garcia 20	Pts: Russel Bayani 18

Mall of Asia Arena, Pasay

== All-Star Game ==
=== Selection ===
The National Basketball Training Center selected and ranked 24 of the best high school prospects in the country. Rising stars from international and regional teams during the tournament were added to the lineups of Team Heart and Team Hustle.

Jared Bahay (the league's top-ranked player for the 2nd year in a row) and Kieffer Alas (ranked #2) led Team Heart and Team Hustle, respectively. Andy Gemao and seven other players were added to both lineups.

2024 NBTC All-Stars
Rank	Player	League / Region	Team
#1	Jared Bahay	CESAFI	SHS – Ateneo
#2	Kieffer Alas	UAAP	DLSZ
#3	Amiel Acido	NCAA	Perpetual
#4	Doys Dungo	UAAP	UST
#5	Tebol Garcia	UAAP	Adamson
#6	Titing Manalili	NCAA	Letran
#7	Vince Reyes	UAAP	Adamson
#8	Kristian Porter	UAAP	Ateneo
#9	George Diamante	NCAA	Letran
#10	Veejay Pre	UAAP	FEU
#11	Jhames Daep	NCAA	Perpetual
#12	Jelomar Rota	CESAFI	SHS – Ateneo
#13	EJ Castillo	NCAA	EAC
#14	John Alejandro	UAAP	UE
#15	Lawrence Mangubat	NCAA	Mapua
#16	Macmac Alfanta	UAAP	NUNS
#17	Mark Gojo Cruz	NCAA	Perpetual
#18	Ruvic Danag	NCAA	San Sebastian
#19	Daryl Valdeavilla	UAAP	UPIS
#20	Wacky Ludovice	UAAP	UST
#21	Andre Lumanag	Mindanao Regionals	Toyomoto Auto Supply-Davao
#22	Jevy Hinoguin	North Luzon Regionals	Yengskivel Sportswear-CAMANAVA
#23	Renz Apor	South Luzon Regionals	Batang Tiaong-Quezon
#24	Peter John Peteros	Visayas Regionals	Khalifa-Cebu
Additions
Name		Team	
Andy Gemao		Fil-Am Nation Select	
Terrence Hill Jr.		Fil-Am Nation Select	
Matthew Jucom		Don Bosco	
Russel Liwanag		PPG Tarlac	
Jacob Bayla		Fil-Am Nation Select	
EJ Sapasap		PPG Tarlac	
JB Lim		UST	
John Rodulfa		Customs	

=== Lineups ===
Team Heart
Player	Team
Starters
Jared Bahay	SHS – Ateneo
Mark Gojo Cruz	Perpetual
Jelomar Rota	SHS – Ateneo
Andy Gemao	Fil-Am Nation Select
Kristian Porter	Ateneo
Reserves
Veejay Pre	FEU
Lawrence Mangubat	Mapua
Peter John Peteros	Khalifa-Cebu
George Diamante	Letran
Macmac Alfanta	NUNS
EJ Castillo	EAC
Renz Apor	Batang Tiaong
Jevy Hinoguin	Yengskivel
Terrence Hill Jr.	Fil-Am Nation Select
Matthew Jucom	Don Bosco
Russel Liwanag	PPG Tarlac
Head coach: Allen Ricardo (Letran)

Team Hustle
Player	Team
Starters
Kieffer Alas	DLSZ
John Alejandro	UE
Jacob Bayla	Fil-Am Nation Select
Amiel Acido	Perpetual
Doys Dungo	UST
Reserves
Titing Manalili	Letran
Vince Reyes	Adamson
Tebol Garcia	Adamson
Jhames Daep	Perpetual
Wacky Ludovice	UST
Ruvic Danag	San Sebastian
Andre Lumanag	Toyomoto Auto Supply
Daryl Valdeavilla	UPIS
EJ Sapasap	PPG Tarlac
JB Lim	UST
John Rodulfa	Customs
Head coach: Mike Fermin (Adamson)

=== Game ===
NBTC Facebook page & Smart Sports

March 23
5:30 pm

Recap

Team Heart 106, Team Hustle 114
Pts: Pre 20	Pts: Alas 24

Mall of Asia Arena, Pasay

=== Other side events ===
- Skills challenge: Kieffer Alas
- Shooting Stars: KC Ioane, Tim Broth, Lorenzo Dimayuga, and Allen Vergara
- Three-Point Shootout: Mick Geronimo
- Slam Dunk Contest: Winnie Fernandez

== Awards ==
=== Division 1 ===
- Ato Badolato Most Outstanding Player: Terrence Hill Jr. (Fil-Am Nation Select)
- Finals Most Outstanding Player: Terrence Hill Jr. (Fil-Am Nation Select)
- Best Defensive Player: Eian Lowe (Fil-Am Nation Select)
- Mythical Five:

Division 1 Mythical Five
Name	Team
Terrence Hill Jr.	Fil-Am Nation Select
Andy Gemao	Fil-Am Nation Select
Jacob Bayla	Fil-Am Nation Select
Tebol Garcia	Adamson Baby Falcons
Vince Reyes	Adamson Baby Falcons

=== Division 2 ===
- Ato Badolato Most Outstanding Player: Allen Vergara (Top Flight)
- Finals Most Outstanding Player: Allen Vergara (Top Flight)
- Best Defensive Player: John Carl Catayong (PCU-Dasma)
- Mythical Five:

Division 2 Mythical Five
Name	Team
Allen Vergara	Top Flight Sports-Canada West
Russel Bayani	Eco Green Technology-Makati
Lauro Pronda	PCU-Dasmariñas
Justin Cargo	SRIC-Iloilo
Jaymark Lloren	EZ Jersey x Yurich x Arellano University
