= 2018 NBTC National Finals =

Edition of PH high school basketball tournament

Tournament details
- Venue(s): SM Mall of Asia; Cuneta Astrodome
- Dates: March 18–23
- Teams: 32

Final positions
- Champions: Division 1: NUNS Bullpups (1st title); Division 2: DLSL (2nd title)
- Runners-up: Division 1: LSGH Greenies; Division 2: Letran - Bataan

Awards
- Most Outstanding Player: Division 1: Jalen Green (FilAm Sports); Division 2: Ian Abila (DLSL)
- Finals MOP: Division 1: Carl Tamayo (NUNS)
- Best Defensive Player: Division 1: Tony Ynot (San Beda); Division 2: Ian Abila (DLSL)

The 2018 NBTC National Finals was a basketball competition in the Philippines hosted by the National Basketball Training Center (NBTC) to determine the champion for the 2017–2018 NBTC League season. It involved 32 high school teams, with 16 regional teams, eight representatives from the NCR, and six global squads. It began on March 18, 2018, and ended on March 23. Also taking place during this time was the NBTC All-Star Game and several other side events.

The NUNS Bullpups won their first title in tournament history as they won Division 1. In Division 2, De La Salle Lipa won their second NBTC title.

== Qualification ==
This year's format involved a total of 835 teams across 76 cities nationwide. For teams based in the NCR, the UAAP Jrs., NCAA Jrs., and Metro Manila Basketball League (MMBL) tournaments are used as qualifiers, with the winners and first runner-ups of those tournaments getting to play in the National Finals. CESAFI champions and first runner-ups were also guaranteed qualification. The rest of the field was made up of four international teams and 16 regional teams.

Regional teams
Vacancies	Qualified	Ref.
16	University of Baguio; Lyceum – Cavite; De La Salle Lipa Green Chevrons; Assumption Montessori School - CDO; Assumption College of Davao; Notre Dame of Midsayap College (NDMC); Hercor College of Roxas; St. Benilde International School - Laguna; Letran - Bataan; Bacolod Tay Tung High School; Thunderbolts; Shepherdville National High School - Naga; New Ormoc City National High School; SLS-Don Bosco - Dumaguete; Saint Columban College - Pagadian; University of Luzon (UL) - Dagupan; University of Assumption (UA) - San Fernando	

NCR, CESAFI, and international teams
Event	Date	Location	Vacancies	Qualified	Ref.
NCR representatives from UAAP	February 23–March 2, 2018	Filoil Flying V Centre, San Juan City	2	UAAP winner - Ateneo Blue Eaglets; UAAP first runner-up - NUNS Bullpups	
NCR representatives from NCAA	November 6–16, 2018	Smart Araneta Coliseum, Quezon City	2	NCAA winner - LSGH Greenies; NCAA first runner-up - Mapua Red Robins	
NCR representatives from MMBL	February 5, 2018	San Beda gym	2	MMBL winner - Chiang Kai-shek College; MMBL first runner-up - San Beda Red Cubs	
Representatives from CESAFI	October 12, 2017	Cebu Coliseum	2	CESAFI winner - UV Baby Lancers; CESAFI first runner-up - Sacred Heart School – Ateneo de Cebu Magis Eagles	
Wildcards			4	Letran Squires; Hope Christian High School; Adamson Baby Falcons; San Sebastian Staglets	
Global teams			4	USA- Fil-Am Sports; Canada- Durham Crossover; New Zealand - Camp David; Australia- AusPinoy	

== Tournament format ==
The tournament kicked off with the Seeding Round, with teams representing the UAAP, NCAA, CESAFI, and MMBL given the first eight seeds. The four international teams were seeded 9 to 12, followed by NCR wildcard teams at 13 to 16, the top eight regional champions from the previous national finals at 17 to 24, and the remaining eight regional champions at 25 to 32. The international teams would face the NCR wildcard teams in the seeding round, as would the regional champions. The winners of the seeding round, would claim the higher seed in their duel, while the loser took the lower seed, as all teams advanced to the first round.

In the first round, winners advance into the Division 1 tournament, with losers being sent to the Division 2 tournament. Both tournaments observe the same knockout format until the final round.

== Seeding round ==
March 19, 2018
#9 AusPinoy	57–58	#16 Hope Christian	One E-Com Center, Pasay
#10 Camp David	54–95	#15 SSC-R	One E-Com Center, Pasay
#11 Durham Crossover	65–64	#14 Letran	One E-Com Center, Pasay
#12 FilAm Sports	77–82	#13 Adamson	One E-Com Center, Pasay
#25 UA	71–48	#32 New Ormoc Natl HS	One E-Com Center, Pasay
#26 SLS-Don Bosco	71–69	#31 Shepherdville	One E-Com Center, Pasay
#27 St. Columban	49–76	#30 Letran - Bataan	One E-Com Center, Pasay
#28 Tay Tung	87–62	#29 UL	One E-Com Center, Pasay

== Tournament bracket ==
=== Division I ===
Super 32
1	Ateneo	98
32	New Ormoc Natl HS	47
17	Assumption CDO	79
16	AusPinoy	86
9	Hope Christian	84
24	St. Benilde-Laguna	77
25	UA – San Fernando	36
8	SHS – Ateneo de Cebu	82
5	NUNS	81
28	Tay Tung	63
21	Notre Dame of Midsayap	65
12	Adamson	86
13	FilAm Sports	92
20	DLSL	59
29	UL–Dagupan	73
4	University of the Visayas	100
3	Chiang Kai-shek	68
30	St. Columban	44
19	Assumption College-Davao	63
14	Letran	88
11	Durham Crossover	80
22	U of Baguio	75
27	Letran - Bataan	48
6	Mapua	68
7	San Beda	105
26	SLS-Don Bosco	40
23	Hercor College–Roxas	54
10	SSC-R	84
15	Camp David	59
18	Lyceum – Cavite	85
31	Shepherdville	46
2	LSGH	85

Sweet 16
1	Ateneo	74
16	AusPinoy	55
9	Hope Christian	63
8	SHS – Ateneo de Cebu	70
5	NUNS	98
12	FilAmSports	74
13	FilAm Sports	102
4	University of the Visayas	68
3	Chiang Kai-shek	78
14	Letran	72
11	Durham Crossover	70
6	Mapua	78
7	San Beda	74
10	SSC-R	72
15	Lyceum – Cavite	77
2	LSGH	84

Elite 8
1	Ateneo	70
8	SHS – Ateneo de Cebu	72
5	NUNS	98
13	FilAm Sports	92
3	Chiang Kai-shek	86
6	Mapua	67
7	San Beda	64
2	LSGH	69

Final Four
8	SHS – Ateneo de Cebu	71
5	NUNS	90
3	Chiang Kai-shek	64
2	LSGH	81

Finals
5	NUNS	95
2	LSGH	83

==== Finals ====
ESPN5

March 24
5:00 pm

Recap

LSGH 83, NUNS 95
Scoring by quarter: 22–21, 41–50, 64–72, 83–95
Pts: Inand Fornilos 20	Pts: Carl Tamayo 18

Mall of Asia Arena, Pasay

=== Division II ===
Sweet 16
1	Assumption CDO	89
16	New Ormoc Natl HS	60
8	St. Benilde-Laguna	72
9	UA – San Fernando	45
5	Notre Dame of Midsayap	62
12	Tay Tung	64
4	DLSL	75
13	UL–Dagupan	60
6	U of Baguio	64
11	Letran - Bataan	68
3	Assumption College-Davao	75
14	St. Columban	50
7	Hercor College–Roxas	76
10	SLS-Don Bosco	77
2	Camp David	75
15	Shepherdville	77

Elite 8
1	Assumption CDO	62
8	St. Benilde-Laguna	78
12	Tay Tung	63
4	DLSL	68
11	Letran - Bataan	78
3	Assumption College-Davao	73
10	SLS-Don Bosco	83
15	Shepherdville	78

Final 4
8	St. Benilde-Laguna	78
4	DLSL	79
11	Letran - Bataan	59
10	SLS-Don Bosco	45

Final
4	DLSL	49
11	Letran - Bataan	41

==== Finals ====
ESPN5

March 23
3:00 pm

Recap

DLSL 41, Letran - Bataan 90
Scoring by quarter: 13–14, 18–25, 31–33, 49–44
Pts: Matthew Virtucio 15	Pts: Kevin Raymundo 13

Mall of Asia Arena, Pasay

== All-Star Game ==
=== Selection ===
The National Basketball Training Center selected and ranked 24 of the best high school prospects in the NCAA and UAAP juniors, CESAFI, and MMBL high school tournaments.

This year saw Kai Sotto from the UAAP Jrs and Joel Cagulangan from the NCAA Jrs take the top two spots on the rankings. They were also the top two picks for the all-star draft, with Cagulangan being drafted first overall by assistant coach Marvin Bienvenida for Team Heart, while Sotto was drafted second overall by Joe Silva for Team Hustle. Team Heart was coached by Chris Gavina, while Team Hustle was coached by Topex Robinson. Additional players from international teams were also added to both lineups.

2018 NBTC All-Stars
Rank	Player	League	Team
#1	Kai Sotto	UAAP	Ateneo
#2	JD Cagulangan	NCAA	LSGH
#3	SJ Belangel	UAAP	Ateneo
#4	Will Gozum	NCAA	Mapua
#5	CJ Cansino	UAAP	UST
#6	Dave Ildefonso	UAAP	Ateneo
#7	L-Jay Gonzales	UAAP	FEU-D
#8	John Galinato	MMBL	Chiang Kai Shek
#9	Rhayyan Amsali	UAAP	NUNS
#10	Aaron Fermin	NCAA	Arellano
#11	Clint Escamis	NCAA	Mapua
#12	Inand Fornilos	NCAA	LSGH
#13	Warren Bonifacio	NCAA	Mapua
#14	Terrence Fortea	UAAP	NUNS
#15	RJ Abarrientos	UAAP	FEU-D
#16	Evan Nelle	NCAA	San Beda
#17	Beirn Laurente	CESAFI	UV
#18	Miguel Oczon	UAAP	NUNS
#19	Joem Sabandal	UAAP	Adamson
#20	Raven Cortez	UAAP	DLSZ
#21	Mac Guadaña	NCAA	LPU
#22	Joshua Yerro	CESAFI	UV
#23	Harvey Pagsanjan	MMBL	Hope Christian
#24	Alex Visser	CESAFI	SHS – Ateneo
Additions
Name		Team	
Jalen Green		Fil-Am Sports	
Kihei Clark		Fil-Am Sports	
Matthew Daves		Durham Crossover	
Cooper McLaughlin		AusPinoy	
Brandon Wilson		Fil-Am Sports	
Taine Davis		Camp David	
Maui Cruz		EAC	

=== Lineups ===
Team Heart
Player	Team
Starters
JD Cagulangan	LSGH
L-Jay Gonzales	FEU-D
Jalen Green	Fil-Am Sports
Dave Ildefonso	Ateneo
Aaron Fermin	Arellano
Reserves
Inand Fornilos	LSGH
Beirn Laurente	UV
Brandon Wilson	Fil-Am Sports
Warren Bonifacio	Mapua
Clint Escamis	Mapua
John Galinato	Chiang Kai Shek
Raven Cortez	DLSZ
Maui Cruz	EAC
Joshua Yerro	UV
Taine Davis	Camp David
Evan Nelle	San Beda
Head coach: Chris Gavina (Rain or Shine)

Team Hustle
Player	Team
Starters
RJ Abarrientos	FEU-D
SJ Belangel	Ateneo
CJ Cansino	UST
Will Gozum	Mapua
Kai Sotto	Ateneo
Reserves
Joem Sabandal	Adamson
Kihei Clark	Fil-Am Sports
Rhayyan Amsali	NUNS
Harvey Pagsanjan	Hope Christian
Miguel Oczon	NUNS
Mac Guadana	LPU
Terrence Fortea	NUNS
Cooper McLaughlin	AusPinoy
Matthew Daves	Durham Crossover
Alex Visser	SHS – Ateneo
Head coach: Topex Robinson (Lyceum)

=== Game ===
ESPN5

March 23
4:00 pm

Recap

Team Hustle 99, Team Heart 91
Scoring by quarter: 18–18, 38–40, 67–63, 99–91
Pts: Belangel 16	Pts: Galinato 15

Mall of Asia Arena, Pasay

=== Other side events ===
- Skills challenge: Carl Tamayo
- Three-Point Shootout: Shaun de Leon
- Slam Dunk Contest: Jalen Green

== Awards ==
=== Division 1 ===
- Most Outstanding Player: JD Cagulangan (LSGH)
- Finals Most Outstanding Player: Gerry Abadiano (NUNS)
- Best Defensive Player: Inand Fornilos (LSGH)
- Mythical Five:

Division 1 Mythical Five
Name	Team
Terrence Fortea	Nazareth School of National University Bullpups
Gerry Abadiano	Nazareth School of National University Bullpups
JD Cagulangan	LSGH Greenies
Jalen Green	Fil Am Sports USA
Errol Pastor	Sacred Heart School – Ateneo de Cebu Magis Eagles

=== Division 2 ===
- Most Outstanding Player: Ian Abila (De La Salle Lipa)
- Defensive Player of the Year: Ian Abila (De La Salle Lipa)
- Mythical Team:

Division 2 Mythical Team
Name	Team
Ian Abila	De La Salle Lipa
Raphael Dimayuga	De La Salle Lipa
Julius Garcia	Letran-Bataan
James Barrera	Bacolod Tay Tung High School
