= 2026 National Student Athletes Championship =

2026 Philippine college basketball tournament

- Official promotional poster

Tournament details
- Country: Philippines
- Cities: Las Piñas; Manila; Quezon City
- Venue: see venues
- Dates: April 11 – May 31, 2026
- Teams: 16
- TV partner(s): One Sports+ Solar Sports

Final positions
- Champions: UST Growling Tigers
- Runners-up: NU Bulldogs
- Third place: De La Salle Green Archers
- Fourth place: San Beda Red Lions

The 2026 National Student Athletes Championship (NSAC) (Note: The full name of the tournament is the 2026 National Student Athletes Championship College Basketball Campus Tour) is a college basketball tournament organized by AsiaBasket. The tournament is being run from April 11 to May 31, 2026 and feature sixteen teams from three different associations.

== Teams ==
Sixteen (16) teams will compete at the tournament, up from fourteen (14) during the 2025 AsiaBasket College Campus Tour. The participants include seven teams from the University Athletic Association of the Philippines (UAAP), eight teams from the National Collegiate Athletic Association (NCAA), and one team from the National Athletic Association of Schools, Colleges and Universities (NAASCU).

Team	College	Association
Adamson Soaring Falcons	Adamson University	UAAP
Arellano Chiefs	Arellano University	NCAA
Ateneo Blue Eagles	Ateneo de Manila University	UAAP
Benilde Blazers	De La Salle–College of Saint Benilde	NCAA
De La Salle Green Archers	De La Salle University	UAAP
FEU Tamaraws	Far Eastern University	UAAP
Letran Knights	Colegio de San Juan de Letran	NCAA
Lyceum Pirates	Lyceum of the Philippines University	NCAA
Mapúa Cardinals	Mapúa University	NCAA
NU Bulldogs	National University	UAAP
Perpetual Altas	University of Perpetual Help System DALTA	NCAA
San Beda Red Lions	San Beda University	NCAA
San Sebastian Stags	San Sebastian College – Recoletos	NCAA
St. Clare Saints	St. Clare College of Caloocan	NAASCU
UP Fighting Maroons	University of the Philippines Diliman	UAAP
UST Growling Tigers	University of Santo Tomas	UAAP

== Venues ==
The 2026 NSAC is planned to be held in six venues.

College	Facility	Location	Rounds
Ateneo de Manila University	Blue Eagle Gym	Loyola Heights, Quezon City	Group phase Finals
De La Salle University	Enrique Razon Sports Complex	Malate, Manila	Semifinals
De La Salle–College of Saint Benilde	Sports and Dormitory Complex	Malate, Manila	Classification round Quarterfinals
University of Perpetual Help System DALTA	UPHSD Gymnasium 2	Las Piñas	Round of 16
San Beda University	RC Gym	San Miguel, Manila	Group phase
University of the Philippines Diliman	Varsity Training Center	Diliman, Quezon City	Group phase Round of 16

== Group phase ==
The sixteen teams are divided into four groups of four. Each group competes in a single round-robin tournament, with each team playing one game against their three group opponents. Standings from the group phase will determine seeding in the final phase.

=== Group A ===
Pos	Team	Pld	W	L	PF	PA	PD	PCT	UP	ADMU	CSB	LPU
1	UP Fighting Maroons	3	3	0	274	250	+24	1.000	—	91–88	81–80	102–82
2	Ateneo Blue Eagles	3	2	1	278	270	+8	.667	88–91	—	119–115	71–64
3	Benilde Blazers	3	1	2	284	284	0	.333	80–81	115–119	—	89–84
4	Lyceum Pirates	3	0	3	230	262	−32	.000	82–102	64–71	84–89	—

Source: Genius Sports
Rules for classification: 1) Win percentage; 2) Head-to-head record; 3) Head-to-head point differential; 4) Head-to-head points scored; 5) Overall point differential; 6) Overall points scored.

Solar Sports

April 11
2:00 pm

Boxscore

Lyceum Pirates	64–71	Ateneo Blue Eagles
Scoring by quarter: 13–16, 17–20, 14–21, 20–14
Pts: Panelo 13; Rebs: three players 5 Asts: Rubico 6		Pts: Alas 21; Rebs: Baruwa 10; Asts: Bahay 6

San Beda University

One Sports+, Solar Sports

April 12
2:00 pm

Boxscore

Benilde Blazers	89–84	Lyceum Pirates
Scoring by quarter: 26–18, 22–31, 22–20, 19–15
Pts: Liwag 23; Rebs: Liwag 15; Asts: Ancheta, Liwag 6		Pts: Daileg 19; Rebs: Ondoa 8 Asts: three players 2

San Beda University

One Sports+

April 18
4:00 pm

Boxscore

Ateneo Blue Eagles	119–115 (OT)	Benilde Blazers
Scoring by quarter: 29–23, 25–22, 27–33, 23–26, Overtime: 15–11
Pts: Tuano 25; Rebs: Baltazar 10; Asts: Bongo 5		Pts: Liwag 26; Rebs: Liwag 11; Asts: Ancheta, Liwag 7

Blue Eagle Gym, Ateneo de Manila University

One Sports+, Solar Sports

April 19
4:00 pm

Boxscore

UP Fighting Maroons	91–88	Ateneo Blue Eagles
Scoring by quarter: 21–26, 25–15, 22–18, 22–29
Pts: Remogat 22; Rebs: Stevens 11; Asts: Poyos 7		Pts: Tuano 18; Rebs: Baruwa 9 Asts: Bahay 7

Blue Eagle Gym, Ateneo de Manila University

One Sports+

April 25
4:00 pm

Boxscore

Benilde Blazers	80–81	UP Fighting Maroons
Scoring by quarter: 25–16, 31–28, 18–23, 5–15
Pts: Jucom 17; Rebs: Liwag 6 Asts: Torres 6		Pts: Gemao 19; Rebs: Stevens 11; Asts: Gemao 5

University of the Philippines Diliman

One Sports+, Solar Sports

April 26
4:00 pm

Boxscore

UP Fighting Maroons	102–82	Lyceum Pirates
Scoring by quarter: 36–19, 24–19, 20–16, 22–28
Pts: Alter, Pre 11; Rebs: Pre 8 Asts: Remogat 6		Pts: Daileg 12; Rebs: Ondoa, Aurigue 5 Asts: Guadaña 6

University of the Philippines Diliman

=== Group B ===
Pos	Team	Pld	W	L	PF	PA	PD	PCT	UST	NU	UPHSD	SSC–R
1	UST Growling Tigers	3	3	0	257	188	+69	1.000	—	75–68	80–57	102–63
2	NU Bulldogs	3	2	1	208	209	−1	.667	68–75	—	64–60	76–74
3	Perpetual Altas	3	1	2	201	222	−21	.333	57–80	60–64	—	84–78
4	San Sebastian Stags	3	0	3	215	262	−47	.000	63–102	74–76	78–84	—

Source: Genius Sports
Rules for classification: 1) Win percentage; 2) Head-to-head record; 3) Head-to-head point differential; 4) Head-to-head points scored; 5) Overall point differential; 6) Overall points scored.

Solar Sports

April 12
12:00 pm

Boxscore

San Sebastian Stags	74–76	NU Bulldogs
Scoring by quarter: 11–28, 21–17, 17–21, 22–10
Pts: Ynot 15; Rebs: three players 5 Asts: Ynot 5		Pts: Tulabut 10; Rebs: Reyes 5 Asts: Locsin 5

San Beda University

One Sports+

April 18
10:00 am

Boxscore

San Sebastian Stags	78–84	Perpetual Altas
Scoring by quarter: 21–25, 15–23, 20–20, 22–16
Pts: Gabat 17; Rebs: Alforque 7 Asts: Gabat 4		Pts: Cruz 21; Rebs: Pagulayan 5 Asts: three players 3

Blue Eagle Gym, Ateneo de Manila University

One Sports+

April 19
12:00 pm

UST Growling Tigers	75–68	NU Bulldogs

Blue Eagle Gym, Ateneo de Manila University

One Sports+, Solar Sports

April 25
2:00 pm

UST Growling Tigers	80–57	Perpetual Altas

University of the Philippines Diliman

One Sports+, Solar Sports

April 26
9:00 am

San Sebastian Stags	63–102	UST Growling Tigers

University of the Philippines Diliman

One Sports+, Solar Sports

April 26
11:00 am

Perpetual Altas	60–64	NU Bulldogs

University of the Philippines Diliman

=== Group C ===
Pos	Team	Pld	W	L	PF	PA	PD	PCT	FEU	CSJL	AU	SCC
1	FEU Tamaraws	3	3	0	261	200	+61	1.000	—	100–76	89–76	72–48
2	Letran Knights	3	2	1	254	264	−10	.667	76–100	—	106–100	72–64
3	Arellano Chiefs	3	1	2	258	270	−12	.333	76–89	100–106	—	82–75
4	St. Clare Saints	3	0	3	187	226	−39	.000	48–72	64–72	75–82	—

Source: Genius Sports
Rules for classification: 1) Win percentage; 2) Head-to-head record; 3) Head-to-head point differential; 4) Head-to-head points scored; 5) Overall point differential; 6) Overall points scored.

One Sports+, Solar Sports

April 11
12:00 pm

Boxscore

St. Clare Saints	48–72	FEU Tamaraws
Scoring by quarter: 8–22, 18–16, 7–18, 15–16
Pts: Escobido 12; Rebs: Diona 8 Asts: Escobido 5		Pts: Konateh 15; Rebs: Konateh 11; Asts: Bautista 5

San Beda University

One Sports+, Solar Sports

April 12
10:00 am

Boxscore

Arellano Chiefs	82–75	St. Clare Saints
Scoring by quarter: 29–8, 16–17, 23–23, 14–27
Pts: Ongotan 23; Rebs: Abiera, Libang 5 Asts: Vinoya 3		Pts: Diona 18; Rebs: Diona 14; Asts: Manzano 5

San Beda University

One Sports+

April 18
12:00 pm

Boxscore

FEU Tamaraws	100–76	Letran Knights
Scoring by quarter: 24–17, 21–24, 28–26, 27–9
Pts: Konateh 31; Rebs: Konateh 20; Asts: Pasaol 9		Pts: Manalili 22; Rebs: Manalili 5 Asts: Manalili 10

Blue Eagle Gym, Ateneo de Manila University

One Sports+, Solar Sports

April 19
10:00 am

Letran Knights	72–64	St. Clare Saints

Blue Eagle Gym, Ateneo de Manila University

One Sports+

April 25
12:00 pm

Arellano Chiefs	76–89	FEU Tamaraws

University of the Philippines Diliman

One Sports+

April 26
2:00 pm

Letran Knights	106–100	Arellano Chiefs

University of the Philippines Diliman

=== Group D ===
Pos	Team	Pld	W	L	PF	PA	PD	PCT	SBU	DLSU	MU	AdU
1	San Beda Red Lions	3	3	0	206	185	+21	1.000	—	77–76	63–48	66–61
2	De La Salle Green Archers	3	2	1	258	229	+29	.667	76–77	—	99–83	83–69
3	Mapúa Cardinals	3	1	2	198	226	−28	.333	48–63	83–99	—	67–64
4	Adamson Soaring Falcons	3	0	3	194	216	−22	.000	61–66	69–83	64–67	—

Source: Genius Sports
Rules for classification: 1) Win percentage; 2) Head-to-head record; 3) Head-to-head point differential; 4) Head-to-head points scored; 5) Overall point differential; 6) Overall points scored.

Pilipinas Live (Note: Streaming-exclusive game; no television broadcast was available for this game.)

April 11
4:00 pm

Boxscore

San Beda Red Lions	63–48	Mapúa Cardinals
Scoring by quarter: 24–10, 11–6, 15–13, 13–19
Pts: Marcelo 11; Rebs: Medroso 8 Asts: Gonzales 6		Pts: Cuenco, Lazarte 9 Rebs: Callangan, Reyes 4 Asts: four players 3

San Beda University

One Sports+, Solar Sports

April 12
4:00 pm

Boxscore

De La Salle Green Archers	76–77	San Beda Red Lions
Scoring by quarter: 20–26, 17–18, 25–10, 14–23
Pts: Cortez 16; Rebs: Abadam 8 Asts: Cortez 7		Pts: Etulle 21; Rebs: Torculas 7 Asts: Torculas 4

San Beda University

One Sports+, Solar Sports

April 18
2:00 pm

Boxscore

Adamson Soaring Falcons	69–83	De La Salle Green Archers
Pts: Artango 10; Rebs: Jonah 7 Asts: Edding 4		Pts: Pablo 17; Rebs: Melencio, Pablo 8 Asts: Miller 4

Blue Eagle Gym, Ateneo de Manila University

One Sports+, Solar Sports

April 19
2:00 pm

De La Salle Green Archers	99–83	Mapúa Cardinals

Blue Eagle Gym, Ateneo de Manila University

One Sports+

April 25
10:00 am

Adamson Soaring Falcons	61–66	San Beda Red Lions

University of the Philippines Diliman

One Sports+

April 26
12:00 pm

Mapúa Cardinals	67–64	Adamson Soaring Falcons

University of the Philippines Diliman

== Final phase ==
The sixteen teams are placed into a four-round single-elimination bracket. The final phase also includes classification games after the round of 16.

Round of 16
May 10 – Varsity Training Center
A1	UP	87
D4	Adamson	60
May 10 – Varsity Training Center
B2	NU	87
C3	Arellano	76
May 2 – UPHSD Gymnasium 2
C2	Letran	78
B3	Perpetual	64
May 2 – UPHSD Gymnasium 2
D1	San Beda	67
A4	Lyceum	61
May 10 – Varsity Training Center
B1	UST	87
C4	St. Clare	55
May 2 – UPHSD Gymnasium 2
A2	Ateneo	91
D3	Mapúa	83
May 10 – Varsity Training Center
D2	La Salle	76
A3	Benilde	66
May 2 – UPHSD Gymnasium 2
C1	FEU	100
B4	San Sebastian	77

Quarterfinals
May 23 – E. Razon Sports Center
A1	UP	64
B2	NU	67
May 23 – E. Razon Sports Center
C2	Letran	79
D1	San Beda	82
May 23 – E. Razon Sports Center
B1	UST	86
A2	Ateneo	84
May 23 – E. Razon Sports Center
D2	La Salle	84
C1	FEU	83

Semifinals
May 30 – Blue Eagle Gym
B2	NU	83
D1	San Beda	80
May 30 – Blue Eagle Gym
B1	UST	115
D2	La Salle	107

Finals
May 31 – Blue Eagle Gym
B1	UST	95
B2	NU	84
Third place
May 31 – Blue Eagle Gym
D1	San Beda	61
D2	La Salle	78

=== Round of 16 ===
May 2
10:00 am

FEU Tamaraws	100–77	San Sebastian Stags

University of Perpetual Help System DALTA

May 2
12:00 pm

Ateneo Blue Eagles	91–83	Mapúa Cardinals

University of Perpetual Help System DALTA

May 2
2:00 pm

San Beda Red Lions	67–61	Lyceum Pirates

University of Perpetual Help System DALTA

May 2
4:00 pm

Letran Knights	78–64	Perpetual Altas

University of Perpetual Help System DALTA

May 10
10:00 am

NU Bulldogs	87–76	Arellano Chiefs

University of Philippines Diliman

May 10
1:00 pm

De La Salle Green Archers	76–66	Benilde Blazers

University of Philippines Diliman

May 10
3:00 pm

UST Growling Tigers	87–55	St. Clare Saints

University of Philippines Diliman

May 10
5:00 pm

UP Fighting Maroons	87–60	Adamson Soaring Falcons

University of Philippines Diliman

=== Classification round ===
May 16
10:00 am

Mapúa Cardinals	67–72	St. Clare Saints

De La Salle–College of Saint Benilde

May 16
12:00 pm

Adamson Soaring Falcons	64–57	Arellano Chiefs

De La Salle–College of Saint Benilde

May 16
2:00 pm

Lyceum Pirates	71–74	Perpetual Altas

De La Salle–College of Saint Benilde

May 16
4:00 pm

San Sebastian Stags	83–81	Benilde Blazers

De La Salle–College of Saint Benilde

=== Quarterfinals ===
May 23
10:00 am

UP Fighting Maroons	64–67	NU Bulldogs

De La Salle–College of Saint Benilde

May 23
12:00 pm

Ateneo Blue Eagles	84–86	UST Growling Tigers

De La Salle–College of Saint Benilde

May 23
2:00 pm

San Beda Red Lions	82–79	Letran Knights

De La Salle–College of Saint Benilde

May 23
4:00 pm

FEU Tamaraws	83–84	De La Salle Green Archers

De La Salle–College of Saint Benilde

=== Semifinals ===
May 30
2:00 pm

NU Bulldogs	83–80	San Beda Red Lions

De La Salle University

May 30
4:00 pm

UST Growling Tigers	115–107	De La Salle Green Archers

De La Salle University

=== Third place game ===
May 31
2:00 pm

San Beda Red Lions	61–78	De La Salle Green Archers

Blue Eagle Gym, Ateneo de Manila University

=== Finals ===
May 31
4:00 pm

UST Growling Tigers	95–84	NU Bulldogs

Blue Eagle Gym, Ateneo de Manila University

== See also ==
- U-Belt Collegiate Invitational Season 2
