= List of educational institutions in Dasmariñas =

The following is a list of educational institutions in Dasmariñas, Philippines.

== Universities ==
- De La Salle University – Dasmariñas
- National University Dasmarinas
- Philippine Christian University - Cavite
- Technological University of the Philippines – Cavite
- Cavite State University - Dasmariñas Learning Center
- University of the Philippines Dasmariñas, (groundbreaking).
- Our Lady of Fatima University- Cavite

== Colleges ==
- AISAT College - Dasmariñas
- Brookfield College
- De La Salle Medical and Health Sciences Institute
- Emilio Aguinaldo College Cavite
- Far Eastern Polytechnic College
- Kolehiyo ng Lungsod ng Dasmariñas
- MOL Magsaysay Maritime Academy
- National College of Science and Technology
- Oxfordian Colleges
- PNTC Colleges
- PTS College and Advanced Studies
- Southern Luzon College of Business, Maritime, Science and Technology, Inc.
- St. Jude College Cavite
- STI College Dasmariñas

== Private Schools ==
- Academia Trinitas
- Blessed School of Salitran
- Brentwood Academy of Dasmariñas
- Brightways Academy
- Calvary Baptist Academy
- Caparas Science School - Permanently Closed
- Castilla de San Jose Academy - Temporarily Closed
- Cavite School of Life – Dasmariñas Campus
- Christian Vision School Dasmariñas Inc.
- Christ Life Academy Foundation
- Christ the King College of Cavite Foundation
- Christar Academy
- Colegio de Salitran, Inc.
- Corinthian Institute of Cavite
- Danhill Academy
- Dansart Angels Academy - Temporarily Closed
- Dasmariñas Academy
- Divine College
- Divine Grace School of Dasmariñas
- Divine Saviour Smart Child School
- Escuela De Leonora, Inc.
- Fiat Lux Academe
- Gift of Wisdom Christian Institute
- Glenridge School Corporation
- God The Almighty Academy, Inc.
- Gospel of Truth Learning School
- Grace Baptist Academy of Dasmariñas, Inc. - Temporarily Closed
- Great Mercy Academy of Cavite, Inc.
- Holy Blessing Montessori International School
- Holy Child Jesus Montessori School of Dasmariñas, Inc.
- Holy Redeemer School
- Immaculate Conception Academy
- Infant Jesus Colleges Cavite, Inc.
- Infant Jesus Montessori Center
- Irma Educational Foundation (formerly Mother Mary Integrated School) - Temporarily Closed
- Islamic Studies Call and Guidance Philippines
- Jabez Christian School
- Jesus Christ King of Kings and Lord of Lords Academy - Temporarily Closed
- Jesu Mari School, Inc.
- Jesus Our Shepherd Christian School of Cavite, Inc.
- Jesus Son of Mary Academy
- Jesus the Heart of God Christian Academy - Annex
- Jogen Andrila Academy - Temporarily Closed
- Kerusso Christian Academy
- Kin Yang Academy, Inc.
- La Escuela Del Inteligencia Montessori - Temporarily Closed
- Lancaan Learning Center, Inc.
- Legacy of Wisdom Academy of Dasmariñas, Inc.
- Mahonri Academy and Science High School
- Marasigan Institute of Science and Technology
- Maria Ausiliatrice Montessori
- Marvelous Light Christian Academy
- Mary Auxilium Academy
- Mary Mediatrix of All Grace School
- Marymel Academy, Inc.
- Metanoiah Academy
- Milbraen Educational Foundation - Temporarily Closed
- Minaog Academy
- Mt. Carmel School of Cavite
- National Academy of Science and Technology
- National College of Science and Technology - NCST Education System
- OzPhil College of Cavite Inc.
- Oxford Louise Academy of Dasma., Inc.
- Philippine Christian University
- Prince Aris Christian School, Inc.
- Queen Anne School of Dasmariñas
- Rudishville Academy
- Saint Francis Academy - De La Salle Supervised
- Saint Francis Academy - Governor's Drive
- Saint Francis Academy - LSGH
- Salawag Merryhills School of Dasmariñas - Temporarily Closed
- Scoula Sorelle Faioli
- Seo Gwang Christian School, Inc.
- Shalom Learning Center - Dasmariñas Cavite
- Southern Luzon College of Business, Maritime, Science and Technology
- St. Aloysius Academy of Dasmariñas, Inc.
- St. Angela Merici Montessori
- St. Anthony Montessori Integrated School
- Saint Francis of Assisi College
- St. John Fisher School - Imus
- Saint Joseph Academy of Dasmariñas, Inc.
- Saint Jude Academy of Dasmariñas - Permanently Closed
- St. Jude College Dasmariñas, Cavite Inc.
- St. Mary's Academe, Inc. - Annex
- St. Nicholas De Myra School - Website Unavailable
- St. Pancras Academy
- St. Paul College Island Park
- St. Peter Chanel School of Cavite - Permanently Closed]]
- The First Uniting Christian School
- Torch of Wisdom Montessori
- Vel Maris School
- Warner Christian Academy
- Westhill International School - Website Unavailable
- Whiz World Montessori School - Website Unavailable
- WizBee International School
- Zoe Christian Educational Institution

Source: Private Masterlist of Schools 2011-2012 Dasma City - DepEd

== Public Schools ==
Dasmariñas is divided into ten public school clusters.

=== Cluster I ===
- Dasmariñas Elementary School
- Francisco E. Barzaga Memorial School
- Sabang Elementary School
- Zenaida H. Gaña Memorial School
- Green Breeze Elementary School
- Francisco E. Barzaga Integrated High School

=== Cluster II ===
- Humayao Elementary School
- Langkaan Elementary School
- Edilberto S. Legaspi Integrated High School
- Langkaan II National High School

=== Cluster III ===
- Delfin J. Jaranilla Elementary School
- Malinta Elementary School
- New Era Elementary School
- New Era National High School
- New Era Senior High School
- Vicente P. Villanueva Memorial School

=== Cluster IV ===
- Burol Elementary School
- Ramona S. Tirona Memorial School
- Emmanuel Resurreccion Congressional Integrated High School
- Salitran Elementary School

=== Cluster V ===
- Dasmariñas II Central School
- San Miguel Elementary School
- Sultan Esmael Elementary School
- Dasmariñas Integrated High School

=== Cluster VI ===
- Dr. Jose P. Rizal Elementary School
- Dasmariñas North National High School
- Dr. Jose P. Rizal Senior High School
- Salitran IV Integrated High School

=== Cluster VII ===
- Paliparan Elementary School
- Paliparan III Elementary School
- Paliparan National High School
- Paliparan III Senior High School
- Paliparan II Integrated High School

=== Cluster VIII ===
- Bautista Elementary School
- Sta. Cruz Elementary School
- San Nicolas Elementary School
- Dasmariñas West National High School
- Sampaloc Elementary School

=== Cluster IX ===
- Sta. Cristina Elementary School
- Victoria Reyes Elementary School
- Dasmariñas East Integrated High School
- Pag-asa National High School
- Piela Elementary School

=== Cluster X ===
- Salawag National High School
- Pintong Gubat Elementary School
- Mabuhay City Elementary School
- Salawag Elementary School
