= NBTC Coaches Convention =

Basketball coaches convention in the Philippines

- Status: Active
- Genre: Sports
- Location: Philippines
- Inaugurated: 2011
- Most recent: 21–23 March 2024
- Next event: TBA
- Attendance: 1,500+ (2019 event)
- Organizer: National Basketball Training Center

The NBTC Coaches Convention is one of the programs under the National Basketball Training Center (NBTC). In this convention, basketball coaches from collegiate and professional levels get to share their knowledge to coaches from the provinces. It used to be held at the start of a NBTC League season, but is now held during the league's national finals. It is now set to be revived in 2024.

== History ==
In the early years of the NBTC, Eric Altamirano and Alex Compton traveled to different provinces throughout the country to conduct clinics for players and coaches. After realizing it would be better to bring the coaches to Manila, they held a three-day National Coaches' Convention in 2011 which was attended by 200 coaches and included speakers such as Tim Cone, Chot Reyes, and Ricky Dandan.

The 2012 NBTC Coaches' Convention became a joint project of the NBTC and the MVP Sports Foundation (MVPSF). It was held at the launch of the 2012–13 season of the NBTC League, with 280 attendees and speakers including Altamirano, Cone, Josh Reyes, Koy Banal, Bo Perasol, and Sandy Arrespacochaga. Attendance to the convention is mandatory for NBTC League coaches.

The 2016 edition reached 1,000 attendees. Speakers included Cone, Norman Black, Tab Baldwin, and Boris Aldeguer. Attendees continued increasing with each year. In the last conference held in 2019, over 1,500 coaches attended, including those from public schools in partnership with DepEd. Speakers at that year's conference included Metta World Peace, Baldwin, and Rob Beveridge. Another convention was scheduled for 2020, but was cancelled due to the COVID-19 pandemic. It was revived in March 2024 in partnership with the SBP Coaches' Academy.

== Location, dates, and speakers ==
Notable conventions
Dates	Location	Speakers	Ref.
October 12–14 2012	Philsports Arena	Eric Altamirano, Cone, Josh Reyes, Koy Banal, Bo Perasol, Sandy Arespacochaga, Herc Callanta, Luchie Callanta, and Ardy Abello	
October 27–30 2015	Meralco Gym	Cone, Norman Black, Tab Baldwin, Boris Aldeguer, Kirk Collier, Dr. Rey Canlas, Harvie Baron, Ado Bernardo, Chappy Callanta, and Anthony Pangilinan	
October 27–28 2016	Filoil Flying V Centre	Alex Compton, K. Banal, Butch Antonio, Goldwin Monteverde, Jamike Jarin, Kirk Collier, Gus Vargas, and Ado Bernardo, Ph.D.,	
November 6–8 2017	Ynares Sports Arena	Sonny Barrios, Quinito Henson, Chot Reyes, Baldwin, Paolo Layug, Jimmy Alapag, Callanta, Noli Ayo, and Brett Coxsedge	
March 22–24 2019	Mall of Asia Arena	Metta World Peace, Baldwin, Nash Racela, George Canlas, Ardy Arbello, Vincent Ong, and Rob Beveridge	
March 21–23 2024	CCF Center	Pangilinan, Ayo, LA Mumar, Willy Wilson, Russel Raypon, Compton, Cholo Villanueva, Black, Topex Robinson, Callanta, Rajko Toroman, Jong Uichico, and Nenad Vučinić	
