= NBTC League =

Philippine high-school basketball tournament

- Current season, competition or edition: 2025 NBTC National Finals
- Sport: Basketball
- Founded: 2008; 18 years ago
- First season: 2008–2009
- Organizing body: NBTC
- Country: Philippines
- Most recent champion: Fil-Am Nation Select–USA (2nd title) (2025 NBTC National Finals)
- Most titles: NU (4)
- Streaming partner: Smart Communications
- Sponsor: SM Sports Development

The NBTC League (also known as the Smart-NBTC League for sponsorship purposes) is one of the programs under the National Basketball Training Center (NBTC). It is a Philippine high school basketball tournament through which young players are developed, and coaches and players get opportunities to move up to a higher level of competition. It features the best high school teams from all over the country, and since 2016 has also involved international teams.

== Format ==
The NBTC League tournament usually begins around October or November, and ends around March. It involves players ages 19 and below. The tournament format has gone through many changes as more schools joined the league. Its current format involves high school teams and clubs going through local city qualifiers, then on to the regional championships. The top four highest teams in the regional championships get to go the national finals. For teams based in the NCR, the UAAP Jrs. and NCAA Jrs. tournaments are used as qualifiers. Previously, the league had used the Metro Manila Basketball League (MMBL) as basis for qualification.

The National Finals then takes place in March. Travel to the national finals is free and covered by the NBTC, as is the food and boarding. Admission to the tournament is also free, with fans only needing a valid ID to watch the games live. Teams in the national finals compete in classification matches, with losing teams being relegated to Division II. From there, both divisions will play three-team, four-group competitions with the top teams advancing to the knockout semifinals and finals. Once the finals conclude, awards are then given out, including Most Outstanding Player or MOP (which in 2023, was renamed in Ato Badolato's honor), Finals MOP, Best Defensive Player, and a Mythical Five selection.

The tournament also holds the NBTC All-Star Game, which features 24–30 of the best high school players in the country. In earlier years, tryouts were held to see who would take part in the event. Beginning in 2018, the top 24 high school players based on the NBTC's rankings were chosen to play in the event. The event also features a slam dunk contest, three-point shootout, and skills challenge.

== History ==
=== 2008–2011: Early seasons ===
Eric Altamirano and Alex Compton, the heads of the NBTC, wanted to reach out to more rural areas, so they thought of developing a school-based league. In 2008, the NBTC Developmental League, a 16-and-under tournament, was formed, with Altamirano serving as its tournament director. 29 teams participated in the inaugural tournament, with 24 from Luzon, Visayas, and Mindanao, and five from the NCR. The tournament culminated in 2009 with Smart Sports Manila winning the national championship with a team led by Mike Tolomia, Russel Escoto, Baser Amer and Kiefer Ravena.

Prior to the start of the new season, Compton left his role as an assistant coach of the Rain or Shine Elasto Painters to become the NBTC D-League's director. However, he was reassigned as the training director while Atty. Manny Nitorreda became the tournament director. On December 6, 2009, the new NBTC D-League season began. From 29 teams that participated in the inaugural tournament, that number increased to 108. Two championships were awarded that year, one for NCR teams, and one for teams from the province. B-Meg Expert Cebu, with a team from the University of the Visayas (UV), won the provincial championship, while Smart-Manila claimed the NCR title. For the 2010–11 season, a selection from Cebu would win the national championship over St. John's Institute Bacolod, which was led by Kib Montalbo.

=== 2011–2015: Introduction of NBTC All-Star Game ===
In the 2011–2012 season, the NBTC added an All-Star Game to its league (now known as the Seaoil Elite League). This was patterned after the McDonald's All-American Game in the US. 75 players tried out to take part in the event, with a selection committee composed of NBTC coaches and media selecting 30 players. Former Smart Gilas Pilipinas head coach Rajko Toroman held a basketball seminar for those selected to play in the All-Star Game. The first ever All-Star Game featured Jeron Teng and Thomas Torres with unknown Ace Basas claiming the first-ever All-Star Game MVP. That season, 17 teams made it to the Elite League Finals. In the Elite League Finals round, the Sacred Heart School – Ateneo de Cebu Magis Eagles beat La Union College of Nursing, Arts and Sciences (LUCNAS) to win its 2nd straight Seaoil NBTC Elite League title. It was also the third time a team from Cebu won the title.

For the 2012–13 season, 248 teams participated. The NBTC also partnered with the Metro Manila Basketball League (MMBL) to bring in more teams from the NCR. MMBL semifinalists Hope Christian High School, San Beda College, Faith Academy, and National University represented the NCR in the finals, with 12 other teams coming from other regions. Hope Christian took down reigning champions Sacred Heart School in the semifinals. San Beda, led by Arvin Tolentino, won the tournament over Hope Christian.

For the 2013–14 NBTC Finals, 24 teams were grouped into two divisions. San Beda didn't qualify for the Finals as they didn't make the semis of the MMBL, thus they weren't able to defend their title. The Chiang Kai Shek Dragons, who had also won the MMBL, were crowned as the new champions after defeating NU.

The 2014–15 season saw Chiang Kai Shek repeat as MMBL champions, while Sacred Heart School won the Cebu leg for the 5th time. They comprised two of the 18 teams which qualified for that year's National High School Championships. In the end, Sacred Heart School defeated San Beda to claim its 3rd NBTC title, which was also the first title they claimed over an opponent from the NCR.

=== 2015–2019: NBTC goes international ===
The 2015–16 SM NBTC season saw Durham Crossover from Canada and Trail International School from Thailand become the first international teams to join the league, along with 536 other schools. They lost to Chiang Kai Shek and Sacred Heart School respectively early in the tournament. However, they both lost in the semis to NU and Sacred Heart School respectively. In the Finals, behind John Lloyd Clemente and Justine Baltazar, the Bullpups won that season's championship. That year, Ricci Rivero became the first winner of the NBTC Slam Dunk Contest.

For the 2016–17 season, 700 schools participated. A regional highlight included the USLS Junior Stingers heading to the national finals for the first time. The FEU Baby Tamaraws (who were the UAAP juniors champions) also played in their first NBTC national tournament. Other teams in that year's finals included SHS – Ateneo, San Beda, the Malayan Red Robins, FilAm Sports USA (led by Kamaka Hepa) and more. San Beda, led by Evan Nelle, went perfect in the finals, overcoming FilAm Sports, FEU, and SHS – Ateneo to win the title.

The 2017–18 season introduced a power ranking of the top 24 high school players in the country. Players in the top 24 would get to play in the All-Star Game. The first rankings featured players such as Kai Sotto, SJ Belangel, and Evan Nelle. Sotto would end up becoming the #1 ranked player in the country for that season. In that year's MMBL season, Chiang Kai Shek won the championship over San Beda. In the Cebu leg, UV beat SHS – Ateneo to become the new champions of the region. Meanwhile, Bacolod Tay Tung High School won the Negros Occidental leg.

The 2018 NBTC league finals featured 32 teams bracketed March Madness-style. Other notable teams included in this season's tournament included #1 Ateneo, the defending champions San Beda, the Carl Tamayo-led NU Bullpups, and a FilAm Sports team led by Jalen Green, Kihei Clark and Elijah Jackson. In the Elite 8, Green scored 51 points, the most ever scored in the finals tournament, but it wasn't enough as they lost to NU. NU then beat SHS – Ateneo to get into the Finals, where they were joined by La Salle Green Hills. There, the Bullpups beat LSGH to win it all for the second time in three seasons. The season closed with the All-Star festivities, where Team Hustle won the All-Star Game and Green won the slam dunk contest.

For the 2019 NBTC National Finals, six international teams joined and 105 cities from all over the nation were represented in the tournament. Prominent teams included defending champions NU, NCAA champions Malayan, and FilAm Sports (with Green, Jeron Artest, Eli Ramos, Kainoa Ballungay, and Boogie Ellis). Highlights of the Sweet 16 rounds included Crossover Canada breaking through to the Elite 8 for the first time, and Green and Ballungay leading FilAm Sports past Sotto's Ateneo. Crossover Canada was then eliminated by FEU, while FilAm Sports were defeated by San Beda. At the end of the tournament, NU became the first back-to-back champions in tournament history. In the All-Star festivities, Team Hustle won once again and Green and David Carlos both ended up winning the slam dunk contest.

=== 2019–2022: Cancelled seasons ===
The 2019–20 season began on October 15, 2019. Regional champions for that season included UC High School and Cauayan City High School for the Cordilleras and Region II, SHS – Ateneo for Cebu, the HCCD Red Eagles for Davao, and Tay Tung High School for Western Visayas. However, the National Finals were moved to a later date due to the COVID-19 pandemic. Eventually, they were cancelled.

=== 2022–present: Return of NBTC ===
The NBTC made its return in 2022 with the Global Games, a series of international NBTC Finals qualifiers for Filipinos in different parts of the world. The games lasted from July to November with 7 international teams heading to the nationals. They league opened up the tournament to local club teams, with local qualifiers beginning in August 2022. In the NBTC rankings for that season, Jared Bahay, from SHS – Ateneo, became the first player from the province to be ranked as the best high school player in the country.

24 teams participated in the National Finals' return. San Beda was supposed to participate, but backed out with Ateneo taking its place. In the semis, Bahay faced NU, which was led by Reinhard Jumamoy, the third-ranked player in the country. Jumamoy was able to lead NU back to the finals with a double overtime win over Ateneo. In the Finals, NU won its third straight championship over Fil-Am Nation Select. Jumamoy swept the awards winning both MOP awards, Best Defensive Player, and a spot on the Mythical Five.

In 2024, 32 teams participated with 16 regional teams, two NCR representatives, two wildcard entries, and seven global squads. In the first round, Fil-Am Nation took down defending champions NU, opening the door for a new champion for the first time since 2017. For the first time since international teams started participating in the NBTC National Finals in 2016, international teams won both Division 1 & Division 2 titles, with Fil-Am Nation Select–USA winning Division 1 and Top Flight Sports-Canada West winning Division 2. Fil-Am Nation went on to win the next two editions from 2025 to 2026, completing a three-peat.

== NBTC League National Champions ==
Division I Champions
| Seasons | Division I | |
| Seasons | Team | Finals MOP |
|---|---|---|
| 2008–09 | Smart Sports Manila | None awarded |
| 2009–10 | NCR: Smart-Manila | None awarded |
| 2009–10 | Provincial: B-Meg Expert Cebu University of the Visayas | None awarded |
| 2010–11 | Sacred Heart School – Ateneo de Cebu Magis Eagles | Julius Cadavis |
| 2011–12 | Sacred Heart School – Ateneo de Cebu Magis Eagles | Julius Cadavis |
| 2012–13 | Extreme 97 – San Beda Red Cubs | Arvin Tolentino |
| 2013–14 | Chiang Kai Shek Dragons | JV Gallego |
| 2014–15 | Sacred Heart School – Ateneo de Cebu Magis Eagles | Janjan Jaboneta |
| 2015–16 | Nazareth School of National University Bullpups | John Lloyd Clemente |
| 2016–17 | San Beda Red Cubs | Evan Nelle |
| 2017–18 | Nazareth School of National University Bullpups | Gerry Abadiano |
| 2018–19 | Nazareth School of National University Bullpups | Carl Tamayo |
| 2019–20 | Cancelled due to the COVID-19 pandemic | |
| 2020–21 | Cancelled due to the COVID-19 pandemic | |
| 2021–22 | Cancelled due to the COVID-19 pandemic | |
| 2022–23 | Nazareth School of National University Bullpups | Reinhard Jumamoy |
| 2023–24 | Fil-Am Nation Select–USA | Terrence Hill Jr. |

=== Awards ===
==== Ato Badolato Most Outstanding Players ====
| Seasons | Player | Team |
|---|---|---|
| 2009–10 | NCR: Baser Amer | Smart-Manila |
| 2009–10 | Provincial: James Regalado | B-Meg Expert Cebu University of the Visayas |
| 2010–11 | Julius Cadavis | Sacred Heart School – Ateneo de Cebu Magis Eagles |
| 2011–12 | Julius Cadavis | Sacred Heart School – Ateneo de Cebu Magis Eagles |
| 2012–13 | Clint Doliguez | Hope Christian High School |
| 2013–14 | JV Gallego | Chiang Kai Shek Dragons |
| 2014–15 | Joshua Sinclair | Sacred Heart School – Ateneo de Cebu Magis Eagles |
| 2015–16 | John Lloyd Clemente | Nazareth School of National University Bullpups |
| 2016–17 | Evan Nelle | San Beda Red Cubs |
| 2017–18 | JD Cagulangan | La Salle Greenhills Greenies |
| 2018–19 | Jalen Green | Fil Am Sports USA |
| 2019–20 | Cancelled due to the COVID-19 pandemic | |
| 2020–21 | Cancelled due to the COVID-19 pandemic | |
| 2021–22 | Cancelled due to the COVID-19 pandemic | |
| 2022–23 | Reinhard Jumamoy | Nazareth School of National University Bullpups |
| 2023–24 | Terrence Hill Jr. | Fil-Am Nation Select–USA |

==== Best Defensive Players ====
| Seasons | Player | Team |
|---|---|---|
| 2013–14 | Jonathan Ballon | University of the Cordilleras Laboratory High School |
| 2014–15 | Joshua Sinclair | Sacred Heart School – Ateneo de Cebu Magis Eagles |
| 2015–16 | Justine Baltazar | Nazareth School of National University Bullpups |
| 2016–17 | Kamaka Hepa | Fil Am Sports USA |
| 2017–18 | Inand Fornilos | La Salle Greenhills Greenies |
| 2018–19 | Winston Ynot | San Beda Red Cubs |
| 2022–23 | Reinhard Jumamoy | Nazareth School of National University Bullpups |
| 2023–24 | Eian Lowe | Fil-Am Nation Select–USA |
| 2025–2026 | Rene Baterbonia | Off Campus Residence X Toyomoto |

==== NBTC Mythical Five ====
Division I
| Seasons | Players | High School / Club Team |
|---|---|---|
| 2009–10 | NCR: Mark Cruz, Alfonzo Gotladera, Mark Ollano, Jeron Teng, Mike Tolomia | B-Meg Manila, Smart-Manila, Magnolia Parañaque, Xavier-San Juan, Smart-Manila (respectively) |
| 2009–10 | Provincial: Lomell Loyola, Edcor Marata, Tristan Perez, Reden Celda, Kiervin Revadavia | Smart-Olongapo, B-Meg Expet Cebu UV, Smart-Olongapo, Smart-Cagayan de Oro, Trace College Laguna (respectively) |
| 2010–11 | none awarded | |
| 2011–12 | Ace Basas | Malayan High School of Science |
| 2011–12 | John Boo | De La Salle Zobel |
| 2011–12 | Antonio Bonsubre | San Beda Red Cubs |
| 2011–12 | Julius Cadavis | Sacred Heart School – Ateneo de Cebu Magis Eagles |
| 2011–12 | Jeron Teng | Xavier School |
| 2012–13 | John Apacible | Hope Christian High School |
| 2012–13 | Andrei Caracut | San Beda Red Cubs |
| 2012–13 | John Paul Calvo | Smart Iloilo |
| 2012–13 | Clint Doliguez | Hope Christian High School |
| 2012–13 | Arvin Tolentino | San Beda Red Cubs |
| 2013–14 | Jonathan Ballon | University of the Cordilleras Laboratory High School |
| 2013–14 | Hubert Cani | Nazareth School of National University Bullpups |
| 2013–14 | Robert Castro | University of the Cordilleras Laboratory High School |
| 2013–14 | Adven Diputado | San Beda Red Cubs |
| 2013–14 | Janjan Jaboneta | Sacred Heart School – Ateneo de Cebu Magis Eagles |
| 2014–15 | Andrei Caracut | San Beda Red Cubs |
| 2014–15 | Mark Dyke | Nazareth School of National University Bullpups |
| 2014–15 | JV Gallego | Chiang Kai Shek Dragons |
| 2014–15 | Daniel Mayol | Sacred Heart School – Ateneo de Cebu Magis Eagles |
| 2014–15 | Joshua Sinclair | Sacred Heart School – Ateneo de Cebu Magis Eagles |
| 2015–16 | Sam Abuhilje | San Beda Red Cubs |
| 2015–16 | Justine Baltazar | Nazareth School of National University Bullpups |
| 2015–16 | John Lloyd Clemente | Nazareth School of National University Bullpups |
| 2015–16 | Evan Nelle | San Beda Red Cubs |
| 2015–16 | Errol Pastor | Sacred Heart School – Ateneo de Cebu Magis Eagles |
| 2016–17 | Peter Alfaro | San Beda Red Cubs |
| 2016–17 | Travis Mantua | Sacred Heart School – Ateneo de Cebu Magis Eagles |
| 2016–17 | Evan Nelle | San Beda Red Cubs |
| 2016–17 | Errol Pastor | Sacred Heart School – Ateneo de Cebu Magis Eagles |
| 2016–17 | Andrew Velasco | Sacred Heart School – Ateneo de Cebu Magis Eagles |
| 2017–18 | Gerry Abadiano | Nazareth School of National University Bullpups |
| 2017–18 | JD Cagulangan | La Salle Greenhills Greenies |
| 2017–18 | Terrence Fortea | Nazareth School of National University Bullpups |
| 2017–18 | Jalen Green | Fil Am Sports USA |
| 2017–18 | Errol Pastor | Sacred Heart School – Ateneo de Cebu Magis Eagles |
| 2018–19 | Gerry Abadiano | Nazareth School of National University Bullpups |
| 2018–19 | RJ Abarrientos | FEU Baby Tamaraws |
| 2018–19 | Rhayyan Amsali | San Beda Red Cubs |
| 2018–19 | Joshua David | La Salle Greenhills Greenies |
| 2018–19 | Terrence Fortea | Nazareth School of National University Bullpups |
| 2019–20 | Cancelled due to the COVID-19 pandemic | |
| 2020–21 | Cancelled due to the COVID-19 pandemic | |
| 2021–22 | Cancelled due to the COVID-19 pandemic | |
| 2022–23 | Jared Bahay | Sacred Heart School – Ateneo de Cebu Magis Eagles |
| 2022–23 | Raffy Celis | Sacred Heart School – Ateneo de Cebu Magis Eagles |
| 2022–23 | RJ Colonia | Nazareth School of National University Bullpups |
| 2022–23 | Reinhard Jumamoy | Nazareth School of National University Bullpups |
| 2022–23 | JJ Mandaquit | Fil-Nation Select USA |
| 2023–24 | Terrence Hill Jr. | Fil-Am Nation Select–USA |
| 2023–24 | Andy Gemao | Fil-Am Nation Select–USA |
| 2023–24 | Jacob Bayla | Fil-Am Nation Select–USA |
| 2023–24 | Tebol Garcia | Adamson Baby Falcons |
| 2023–24 | Vince Reyes | Adamson Baby Falcons |

== NBTC All-Star Game results ==
| Year | Result | Host Arena | Game MOP, High School / Club Team | TV Network | Ref. |
|---|---|---|---|---|---|
| 2012 | White 87, Blue 81 | Ynares Sports Arena | Ace Basas, Malayan High School of Science | AKTV | |
| 2013 | Light 92, Dark 78 | Ynares Sports Arena | Rey Nambatac, Colegio de San Juan de Letran | Basketball TV | |
| 2014 | Extreme Dark 123, Mako Light 94 | Ynares Sports Arena | Thirdy Ravena, Ateneo de Manila | Basketball TV | |
| 2015 | Red 106, White 97 | Meralco Gym | Mike Nieto, Ateneo de Manila | Basketball TV | |
| 2016 | North 107, South 95 | SM Mall of Asia Arena | Evan Nelle, San Beda University – Rizal | ABS-CBN Sports and Action | |
| 2017 | North 94, South 89 | SM Mall of Asia Arena | Encho Serrano, Adamson University High School | ABS-CBN Sports and Action | |
| 2018 | Hustle 99, Heart 91 | SM Mall of Asia Arena | Kihei Clark, Fil Am Sports USA | ABS-CBN Sports and Action | |
| 2019 | Hustle 94, Heart 86 | SM Mall of Asia Arena | Mark Nonoy, University of Santo Tomas Senior High School | ESPN5 | |
| 2020 | Cancelled due to the COVID-19 pandemic | | | | |
| 2021 | Cancelled due to the COVID-19 pandemic | | | | |
| 2022 | Cancelled due to the COVID-19 pandemic | | | | |
| 2023 | Hustle 108, Heart 91 | SM Mall of Asia Arena | SJ Moore, Arellano University High School | Livestreamed on the NBTC's Facebook page | |
| 2024 | Hustle 114, Heart 106 | SM Mall of Asia Arena | Kieffer Alas, De La Salle Zobel | Livestreamed on the NBTC's Facebook page | |

=== Other NBTC events winners ===
| Seasons | Slam Dunk Contest | Three-Point Shootout | Skills Challenge |
|---|---|---|---|
| 2015–16 | Ricci Rivero | none held | Evan Nelle |
| 2016–17 | David Carlos | John Lloyd Clemente | none held |
| 2017–18 | Jalen Green | Shaun De Leon | Carl Tamayo |
| 2018–19 | Jalen Green David Carlos | John Erolon | Jasper Rentoy |
| 2019–20 | Cancelled due to the COVID-19 pandemic | | |
| 2020–21 | Cancelled due to the COVID-19 pandemic | | |
| 2021–22 | Cancelled due to the COVID-19 pandemic | | |
| 2022–23 | Lorence Dela Cruz | John Rex Villanueva | Kristian Porter |
| 2023–24 | Winnie Fernandez | Mick Geronimo | Kieffer Alas |

== Girls' tournament ==
In 2023, they launched a girls' high school tournament, with Mau Belen as tournament director and featured eight teams. Fil-Nation Select-USA won the inaugural tournament.

== Sponsors ==
The NBTC tournament was first sponsored mainly by Nokia and TAO Corp. In 2011, Energen sponsored the public high school program, while Seaoil sponsored the private high school program. Seaoil sponsored the NBTC for three years. In 2015, with Seaoil letting go of sponsorship, SM Sports Development took over as principal sponsor. Chooks-to-Go joined SM as a title sponsor in 2019. As of 2024, the NBTC is sponsored by SM and Smart Sports.
