= Saint Jude College =

Private college in Manila, Philippines

PHINMA – Saint Jude College
- Dalubhasaang San Judas (Filipino)
- Former name: St. Jude School of Nursing
- Type: Private Non-sectarian Research Coeducational Basic and Higher education institution
- Established: 1968
- Chairman: Ramon R. del Rosario, Jr.
- President: Raymundo P. Reyes, Ed.D.
- Location: Don Quijote St, Sampaloc, Manila,, Metro Manila, Philippines; 14°36′58″N 120°59′21″E
- Campus: Urban
- Website: www.sjc.phinma.edu.ph
- Location in Manila Location in Metro Manila Location in Luzon Location in the Philippines

PHINMA – St. Jude College is a college of nursing in the city of Manila in the Philippines. It was founded in 1968, although a clinic had existed on the site since 1950.

== Accreditation ==
St. Jude College's School of Nursing is accredited by the Philippine Association of Colleges and Universities Commission on Accreditation (PACUCOA) and was awarded Level III accredited status and certified by the Federation of Accrediting Agencies of the Philippines (FAAP) for its Bachelor of Science in Nursing program.

All programs are CHED (Commission on Higher Education) approved. Aside from Nursing, its undergraduate courses include Information Technology, Computer Studies, Education, Business Administration, Psychology, Hotel and Restaurant Management, Tourism Management, Nutrition and Dietetics, Radiologic Technology, Physical Therapy, Respiratory Therapy, Medical Technology, and Midwifery

== History ==
=== 1950s and 1960s ===
In 1950, a maternity clinic and pharmacy were established at the corner of Maria Clara and Don Quijote streets in Dimasalang, Manila. The 12-bed clinic was founded by Dr. Ramon Diokno Atienza Jr. and Dr. Felicidad Ferriols Calip.

In 1963, a two-storey hospital was built, increasing capacity to 50 beds. Later, it was expanded into a five-storey building, raising capacity to 150. An eight-storey college building was built at about the same time.

On October 28, 1968, the School of Nursing was officially established. It was named after St. Jude Thaddeus as October 28 is the Feast Day of St. Jude.

=== 1970s to present ===
The first class graduated from the school in 1971. The school board approved a resolution to convert St. Jude School of Nursing into a college in 1973 and in 1974 a government permit officially granted the change of status. In 1977, two more buildings were constructed: the High School and what became the main building. In 1978, a three-storey elementary school was added.

In the late 1980s, a further building was inaugurated. It now houses the college of Physical Therapy.

In 2017, PHINMA Education Network's subsidiary PHINMA Education Holdings, Inc. acquired St. Jude College in Sampaloc, Manila for Php 370 million.

In 2019, PHINMA Education Network's subsidiary PHINMA Education Holdings, Inc. acquired Republican College in Cubao, Quezon City for Php 247 million.

In April 2023, PHINMA Republican College was renamed to PHINMA St. Jude College Quezon City.

In December 2024, PHINMA Education Network's subsidiary PHINMA Education Holdings, Inc. acquired St. Jude College Dasmariñas Cavite for Php 432 million.
