= U-Belt Collegiate Invitational Season 2 =

2026 U-Belt Collegiate Invitational
U-Belt Collegiate Invitational Season 2

Tournament details
- Country: Philippines
- Cities: Manila; Pasay; Quezon City; Las Piñas
- Venue: see venues
- Teams: 16
- Defending champions: NU Bulldogs

Final positions
- Champions: JRU Heavy Bombers (1st title)
- Runners-up: EAC Generals
- Third place: San Beda Red Lions
- Fourth place: UST Growling Tigers

The 2026 U-Belt Collegiate Invitational Cup, officially referred to as the U-Belt Collegiate Invitational Season 2, is the second edition of the U-Belt collegiate basketball tournament. The tournament was contested by five teams from the University Athletic Association of the Philippines (UAAP), seven from the NCAA Philippines (NCAA), two from the National Athletic Association of Schools, Colleges and Universities (NAASCU), and one each from the Universities and Colleges Athletic League (UCAL) and the Inter-Scholastic Athletic Association (ISAA).

The NU Bulldogs entered this tournament as the defending champions.

== Teams ==
Team	College	Association
Adamson Soaring Falcons	Adamson University	UAAP
Arellano Chiefs	Arellano University	NCAA
Ateneo Blue Eagles	Ateneo de Manila University	UAAP
Benilde Blazers	De La Salle–College of Saint Benilde	NCAA
CEU Scorpions	Centro Escolar University	UCAL
EAC Generals	Emilio Aguinaldo College	NCAA
FEU Tamaraws	Far Eastern University	UAAP
Letran Knights	Colegio de San Juan de Letran	NCAA
LCCM Blue Royals	La Consolacion College Manila	ISAA
NU Bulldogs	National University	UAAP
OLFU Phoenix	Our Lady of Fatima University	NAASCU
Perpetual Altas	University of Perpetual Help System DALTA	NCAA
San Beda Red Lions	San Beda University	NCAA
San Sebastian Stags	San Sebastian College – Recoletos	NCAA
St. Clare Saints	St. Clare College of Caloocan	NAASCU
UST Growling Tigers	University of Santo Tomas	UAAP

== Venues ==
College	Facility	Location	Rounds
Arellano University	Arellano Gym Legarda	Sampaloc, Manila	Eliminations; Quarterfinals; Semifinals
Arellano University	Arellano Gym Taft	Pasay	Eliminations
Centro Escolar University	Tech Center Gym	San Miguel, Manila	Eliminations
N/A	Hoops Haven	Pasay	Eliminations
Far Eastern University Diliman	FEU Diliman Sports Complex	Quezon City	Eliminations
N/A	Rizal Memorial Coliseum	Malate, Manila	Battle for Third; Finals
University of Perpetual Help System DALTA	UPHSD Gymnasium 2	Las Piñas	Eliminations
San Beda University	RC Gym	San Miguel, Manila	Eliminations

== Elimination round ==
The league did not complete the elimination round games with Letran vs. St. Clare, Ateneo vs. EAC, and Ateneo vs. Perpetual not being played before the start of the playoffs. It is unknown how the seedings were determined despite an uneven number of games played.

=== Group A ===
==== Team standings ====
Pos	Team	Pld	W	L	GF	GA	GD	PCT	GB
1	JRU Heavy Bombers	7	7	0	648	461	+187	1.000	—
2	Adamson Soaring Falcons	7	4	3	466	492	−26	.571	3
3	UST Growling Tigers	7	4	3	555	520	+35	.571	3
4	Benilde Blazers	7	4	3	504	500	+4	.571	3
5	Letran Knights	6	3	3	485	453	+32	.500	3.5
6	St. Clare Saints	6	3	3	406	407	−1	.500	3.5
7	OLFU Phoenix	7	3	4	495	524	−29	.429	4
8	FEU Tamaraws	7	0	7	445	577	−132	.000	7

Updated to match(es) played on unknown. Source:

==== Results ====
Team	Game						
Team	1	2	3	4	5	6	7
Adamson Soaring Falcons (AdU)	FEU; 70–61	UST; 73–67	CSJL; 61–69	JRU; 58–81	CSB; 80–79	SCC; 45–63	OLFU; 79–72
Benilde Blazers (CSB)	JRU; 63–67	FEU; 68–56	CSJL; 76–87	OLFU; 80–75	AdU; 79–80	SCC; 65–70	UST; 73–65
Letran Knights (CSJL)	JRU; 91–93	FEU; 97–64	AdU; 69–61	CSB; 87–76	OLFU; 64–75	UST; 77–84	
FEU Tamaraws (FEU)	AdU; 61–70	CSJL; 64–97	OLFU; 67–72	CSB; 56–68	JRU; 50–93	UST; 75–94	SCC; 72–83
JRU Heavy Bombers (JRU)	OLFU; 84–61	CSJL; 93–91	CSB; 67–63	SCC; 74–61	UST; 79–77	FEU; 93–50	AdU; 81–58
OLFU Phoenix (OLFU)	JRU; 61–84	SCC; 68–65	FEU; 72–67	UST; 79–85	CSB; 75–80	CSJL; 75–64	AdU; 75–79
St. Clare Saints (SCC)	UST; 64–83	OLFU; 65–68	JRU; 61–74	CSB; 70–65	AdU; 63–45	FEU; 83–72	
UST Growling Tigers (UST)	SCC; 83–64	AdU; 67–73	JRU; 77–79	OLFU; 85–79	FEU; 94–75	CSJL; 84–77	CSB; 65–73

Legend: Blue = win; Red = loss

=== Group B ===
==== Team standings ====
Pos	Team	Pld	W	L	PCT	GB
1	NU Bulldogs	7	7	0	1.000	—
2	San Beda Red Lions	7	5	2	.714	2
3	EAC Generals	6	4	2	.667	2.5
4	CEU Scorpions	7	4	3	.571	3
5	Arellano Chiefs	7	4	3	.571	3
6	Ateneo Blue Eagles	5	1	4	.200	5
7	Perpetual Altas	6	1	5	.167	5.5
8	LCCM Blue Royals	7	0	7	.000	7

==== Results ====
Team	Game						
Team	1	2	3	4	5	6	7
Ateneo Blue Eagles (ADMU)	SBU; 65–88	CEU; 73–80	LCCM; 86–60	NU; 73–76	AU; 85–97		
Arellano Chiefs (AU)	CEU; 80–86	NU; 86–93	UPHSD; 89–87	LCCM; 107–70	SBU; 81–68	EAC; 72–79	ADMU; 97–85
CEU Scorpions (CEU)	ADMU; 80–73	AU; 86–80	UPHSD; 74–69	EAC; 66–70	SBU; 68–85	NU; 53–62	LCCM; 101–80
EAC Generals (EAC)	NU; 64–69	SBU; 60–63	LCCM; 91–69	CEU; 70–66	UPHSD; 69–66	AU; 79–72	
LCCM Blue Royals (LCCM)	SBU; 59–101	EAC; 69–91	ADMU; 60–86	AU; 70–107	NU; 60–84	CEU; 80–101	UPHSD; 68–90
NU Bulldogs (NU)	EAC; 69–64	AU; 93–86	SBU; 66–58	LCCM; 84–60	CEU; 62–53	UPHSD; 68–57	ADMU; 76–73
San Beda Red Lions (SBU)	ADMU; 88–65	LCCM; 101–59	EAC; 63–60	NU; 58–66	CEU; 85–68	AU; 68–81	UPHSD; 79–73
Perpetual Altas (UPHSD)	CEU; 69–74	AU; 87–89	EAC; 66–69	NU; 57–68	LCCM; 90–68	SBU; 73–79	–

Legend: Blue = win; Red = loss

== Playoffs ==
The single-elimination playoffs will start with the crossover quarterfinals, where the first-seeded teams play the fourth-seeded team from the opposing association group, same goes for the second-seeded and third-seeded teams.

St. Clare replaced Adamson in the quarterfinals while San Beda replaced NU in the third-place match.

Quarterfinals
May 27 – Arellano Gym Taft
A1	JRU	73
B4	CEU	70
May 27 – Arellano Gym Taft
B2	San Beda	52
A3	UST	75
May 27 – Arellano Gym Taft
B1	NU	75
A4	Benilde	71
May 27 – Arellano Gym Taft
A2	St. Clare	72
B3	EAC	81

Semifinals
May 29 – Arellano Gym Taft
A1	JRU	85
A3	UST	82
May 29 – Arellano Gym Taft
B1	NU	81
B3	EAC	85

Championship game
June 4 – Rizal Memorial Coliseum
A1	JRU	66
B3	EAC	56
Battle for Third
June 4 – Rizal Memorial Coliseum
A3	UST	66
B2	San Beda	80

== See also ==
- 2026 National Student Athletes Championship
