= Andy Gemao =

Filipino basketball player (born 2006)

No. 7 – Penn State Nittany Lions
- Position: Point guard
- Conference: Big Ten Conference

Personal information
- Born: June 26, 2006 (age 20)
- Listed height: 6 ft 1 in (1.85 m)
- Listed weight: 170 lb (77 kg)

Career information
- High school: Letran (Manila); Veritas Academy National Prep (Malibu, California); Royal Crown (Scarborough, Ontario)
- College: Penn State (2026–present)

Apl Mcandrei "Andy" Gemao (born June 26, 2006) is a Filipino basketball player who is currently playing college basketball for the Penn State Nittany Lions. He attended Royal Crown Academic School in Ontario, Canada. He first broke out in high school playing for the Letran Squires in the juniors division of the NCAA in the Philippines, leading them to their first title in 22 years and becoming viral for his athleticism. He then played high school basketball in the US and Canada.

== Early life ==
Gemao first played basketball at four years old, with his father Mark acting as his first coach. Aside from basketball drills, his father also put him through plyometric drills at a young age.

At nine years old, Gemao began playing competitive basketball. Three years later, he competed in the Palarong Pambansa, where they won a silver medal. During this time, he also played for Corpus Christi School in Cagayan de Oro, leading them to a championship in the 2018 SBP-Passerelle Mindanao Regional Finals.

== High school career ==
While he was in Manila for a Jr. NBA camp, Gemao was recruited by National University-Nazareth School (NUNS), who were led by coach Goldwin Monteverde at the time. He was among the last NUNS players to be coached by Monteverde, as Monteverde left NUNS to coach the UP Fighting Maroons.

Gemao then enrolled at the Colegio de San Juan de Letran to play for the Letran Squires of the NCAA's junior division. The Squires were led by first-year head coach Allen Ricardo, who recruited him on the advice of Tom Chua, an assistant of Monteverde and a former high school teammate. In 2023, coming off a stint with the Philippines men's national under-16 team, he made his NCAA juniors debut with 15 points, six rebounds, four assists, three steals, and one block in a win over the San Sebastian Staglets. He then scored a career-high 35 points in a win over the Lyceum Junior Pirates, the most points scored in the NCAA that season. He then went on to lead the Squires to their first NCAA title in 22 years, averaging 17.5 points, 9.5 rebounds, and 3.5 assists as their Finals MVP while also making the Mythical Team with averages of 18.5 points, 6.9 boards, and 2.8 assists for the season. The NBTC ranked him as the 4th-best high school player in the country. Later that year, he was invited to the Basketball Without Borders (BWB) Asia camp.

Initially, Gemao committed to finish his senior high school years with Letran. On September 20, 2023, he left Letran to try out for Veritas Academy National Prep, a Nike Elite high school in California. He played there for his junior year, making the team's regular rotation. In 2024, he was invited to the BWB Global Camp. He then briefly returned to the Philippines to play for Fil-Nation Select in the 2024 NBTC Finals. Teaming up with Terrence Hill Jr., he led them to their first NBTC title.

Gemao then spent his last two years of high school with Royal Crown Academic School. In his Grade 12 season, he led the team to a 19–2 regular-season record and earned All-OSBA Second Team honors. In 2026, Gemao was invited to the Adidas Nations Tokyo Under-19 Special Camp.

On May 8, 2026, Gemao received an offer from Penn State, which he accepted.

== National team career ==
In 2022, Gemao was named to the Philippines men's national under-16 team for the 2022 FIBA U16 Asian Championship. At 15 years old, he was the team's youngest member. In 2024, he played for the Philippine under-18 team in the 2024 FIBA U18 Asia Cup SEABA qualifiers as they swept the tournament. Although they qualified for the FIBA U18 Asia Cup, he was not able to play due to a metacarpal fracture.
