= Terrence Hill Jr. =

American basketball player (born 2005)

No. 3 – Tennessee Volunteers
- Position: Shooting guard / point guard
- Conference: Southeastern Conference

Personal information
- Born: December 22, 2005 (age 20) Portland, Oregon, U.S.
- Listed height: 6 ft 3 in (1.91 m)
- Listed weight: 180 lb (82 kg)

Career information
- High school: Roosevelt (Portland, Oregon); AZ Compass Prep (Chandler, Arizona)
- College: VCU (2024–2026); Tennessee (2026–present)

Career highlights
- First-team All-Atlantic 10 (2026); Atlantic 10 Tournament MVP (2026); Atlantic 10 Most Improved Player (2026); Atlantic 10 Sixth Man of the Year (2026)

Terrence Lavelle Hill Jr. (born December 22, 2005), is an American college basketball player for the Tennessee Volunteers of the Southeastern Conference. He previously played for the VCU Rams.

== High school career ==
In high school, Hill played both basketball and football. An early highlight of his high school basketball career was when he hit a game winner against Cleveland High School. He first played for Roosevelt High in his freshman and sophomore seasons, averaging 20 points per game. In his sophomore year with Roosevelt High, he led them to a 22–8 record, was third in the Portland Interscholastic League (PIL) and finished sixth at the state tournament. He was also named to the all-state second team and was a first team all-league selection.

For his junior year, Hill transferred out of state to AZ Compass Prep. However, he only averaged 3.1 points and 2.1 assists in 12 games there.

For his senior year, Hill decided to return to Roosevelt High. That year, he led Roosevelt High to a 26–3 overall record, the city championship and a trip to the state championship game. With averages of 21.9 points, 5.7 rebounds, and 4.9 assists per game, he was named PIL Player of the Year, to First Team All-State and to the Oregon School Activities Association’s 6A First Team All-Tournament.

Hill also played club basketball in the Nike Elite Youth Basketball League (EYBL) for the Rose City Rebels. In 2024, Hill went to the Philippines to join Fil-Am Nation Select for the 2024 NBTC National Finals. As the team's captain, he led them to the Division I championship. Averaging 17.7 points, 4.8 rebounds and 4.0 assists per game, he was named the tournament's Most Outstanding Player and was also named to the NBTC Mythical Five.

=== Recruiting ===
Hill had multiple offers including Portland, Portland State, and New Mexico. During his sophomore year, Hill was recruited by Ryan Odom of Utah State. Although Odom left Utah State in 2023, he still chose to commit to Utah with Sprinkle.

In 2024, Utah State's head coach Danny Sprinkle left to handle Washington. Hill then reopened his recruitment. Odom, now with VCU, reached out to recruit him again. Weeks later, on May 10, he committed to VCU.

College recruiting
Name	Hometown	School	Height	Weight	Commit date
Terrence Hill Jr. PG	Portland, OR	Roosevelt (OR)	6 ft 3 in (1.91 m)	180 lb (82 kg)	May 10, 2024
Terrence Hill Jr. PG	Recruit ratings: Rivals: ESPN: (79)				
Overall recruit ranking:
Note: In many cases, Scout, Rivals, 247Sports, On3, and ESPN may conflict in their listings of height and weight.; In these cases, the average was taken. ESPN grades are on a 100-point scale.; Sources: "VCU 2024 Basketball Commitments". Rivals.; "2024 Team Ranking". Rivals.

== College career ==
=== VCU (2024–2026) ===
In his freshman season, he saw few minutes on the court, as he played behind guards such as Max Shulga. VCU won the Atlantic 10 tournament that season and lost to BYU in the first round of the 2025 NCAA tournament. That season, he averaged only 3.4 points in only 6.1 minutes.

In March 2025, Hill chose to stay with VCU and play for their new head coach, Phil Martelli Jr. In his sophomore season, Hill became the team's sixth man, bringing scoring off the bench and seeing improvements in his shooting. On February 20, 2026, he tore a tendon on his right thumb, but chose to play through it the rest of the season. That season, he was named Atlantic 10 Most Improved Player, Sixth Man of the Year, and first-team All-Atlantic 10. He became the Atlantic 10 tournament's MVP as VCU won the Atlantic 10 once again.

In the first round of the 2026 NCAA tournament, they faced 6th seeded UNC. Trailing by as many as 19 points, Hill sparked a 14-2 run to bring VCU back into the game. He then scored the game-tying lay-up to force overtime, then made the go-ahead three-pointer with 15 seconds remaining. VCU went on to complete the largest first round comeback in NCAA Tournament history and get their first tournament win in 10 years. Hill finished the game with a career-high 34 points off the bench on seven three-pointers. His 34 points were the most made by a VCU player in tournament history. In the second round, against 3rd seeded Illinois, he scored 17 points, but they were eliminated from the tournament. He then underwent surgery for his thumb.

=== Tennessee (2026–present) ===
On April 3, 2026, Hill entered the transfer portal. On April 19, 2026, it was announced that Hill committed to Tennessee.

== Personal life ==
Hill is born to Tia Riley & Terrence Hill Sr. of Portland, Oregon. Hill has Filipino roots. He has three younger siblings, TyVelle, King & Leilah. His father played both basketball and football in high school, and his late aunt was also a basketball player.

== Career statistics ==
Legend
GP	Games played	GS	Games started	MPG	Minutes per game
FG%	Field goal percentage	3P%	3-point field goal percentage	FT%	Free throw percentage
RPG	Rebounds per game	APG	Assists per game	SPG	Steals per game
BPG	Blocks per game	PPG	Points per game	**Bold**	Career high

=== College ===
Year	Team	GP	GS	MPG	FG%	3P%	FT%	RPG	APG	SPG	BPG	PPG
2024–25	VCU	23	0	6.3	.446	.344	1.000	0.6	0.3	0.2	0.0	3.4
2025–26	VCU	36	2	25.0	.466	.370	.844	2.7	2.8	0.6	0.1	15.0
Career		59	2	17.7	.464	.367	.862	1.8	1.8	0.4	0.0	10.5
