= Jasper Rentoy =

Filipino-Australian basketball player (born 2000)

Personal information
- Born: 23 April 2000 (age 26) Sydney, New South Wales, Australia
- Listed height: 180 cm (5 ft 11 in)

Career information
- High school: St. Clair (Sydney, New South Wales)
- Playing career: 2021–present
- Position: Point guard

Career history
- 2021: Penrith Panthers
- 2022: Inner West Bulls
- 2023: Eastern Mavericks
- 2023–2024: Sydney Kings
- 2024: Manawatu Jets
- 2025: Albury Wodonga Bandits
- 2026: Inner West Bulls

Jasper Rentoy (born 23 April 2000) is an Australian-Filipino professional basketball player who last played for the Inner West Bulls of the NBL1 East.

== Early life and career ==
Rentoy was born and raised in Western Sydney. He grew up attending Sydney Kings holiday camps and began playing competitive basketball at the age of six.

Rentoy attended St. Clair High School in Sydney and played as a youth for the Penrith Panthers. There, he was trained by his father, Arvin Rentoy. As a 15-year-old, he won the New South Wales Basketball Metro League and represented New South Wales in the Australian Junior Championships.

In 2017, Rentoy began playing in the NBTC League. In 2018, his team got eliminated by Ateneo de Manila in the Sweet 16. Throughout the tournament, he played through a fractured ankle. He soon committed to the CSB Blazers, but backed out and returned home due to recover from his injury.

The following year, Rentoy joined Homegrown Basketball Australia for another season in the NBTC League. They lost all their games, but he was still able to average 23.7 points on 43-percent shooting from the field, to go with 5.3 rebounds, 3.0 assists, and 2.0 steals. He also got to play in the All-Star Game. He then won the Skills challenge.

With his performance, Rentoy was able to earn an athletic scholarship to the University of the East. However, he didn't get to play for them when the head coach got dismissed.

== Playing career ==
In 2021, Rentoy joined the Penrith Panthers of the Waratah League. In 2022, he joined the Inner West Bulls for the inaugural NBL1 East season. For the 2023 season, he joined the Eastern Mavericks of the NBL1 Central. In his time with the Mavericks, he averaged 12.3 points, 7.7 assists, 4.1 rebounds and 1.2 steals a game.

After trialling with the Adelaide 36ers in June 2023, Rentoy joined the Sydney Kings as a development player for the 2023–24 NBL season.

Rentoy joined the Manawatu Jets of the New Zealand National Basketball League (NZNBL) as an import for the 2024 season. He ruptured a kneecap after five minutes of the first game and missed the rest of the season.

In November 2024, Rentoy signed with the Albury Wodonga Bandits of the NBL1 East for the 2025 season.

In December 2025, Rentoy signed with the Inner West Bulls for the 2026 NBL1 East season, returning to the team for a second stint.

== Personal life ==
Rentoy holds both Australian and Philippine passports.
