= Zamboanga del Sur National High School =

Public high school in Zamboanga del Sur, Philippines

- The Emblem of ZSNHS

Location
- Sta. Maria District, Pagadian City; Pagadian City, Zamboanga Del Sur; Philippines; 7°50′01″N 123°26′28″E

Information
- Type: Public School
- Established: 1968
- Principal: Mrs. Fe A. Bibanco
- Staff: ~100 (including SHS Dept.)
- Enrollment: ~1000 to ~2000 students
- Nickname: ZSNHS
- Hymn: "ZSNHS Hymn"
- Website: Archived site

Zamboanga del Sur National High School is a public school in Zamboanga del Sur, Philippines, which was established in 1968, is the largest (in terms of student population). It was originally named "Zamboanga del Sur Provincial High School", but was renamed in 1975. it currently has over 5000 students and nearly 100 teachers (including Senior High Department). The school recently went famous for the accident involving three students, Stanley Abria, Jonalyn Oliva and Teffanie Dawn Saipudin.

== Curricular ==
1st* Special Science Curriculum (DOST or STEP, SPST)

3 sections per year level

2nd* Special Program in the Arts Curriculum (SPA)

2 sections per year level

3rd* Basic Education Curriculum (BEC)

10-12 sections per year level

4th* Special Program in Sports (SPS)

2 sections per year level

== Official School Publication ==
- The Reflections English Language Publication
- Busilak Filipino Language Publication

== TV appearance ==
- ABS-CBN Pagadian has made a special segment for Zamboanga del Sur National High school in which every chosen student of the school will be given a chance to report about school.

== See also ==
- Holy Child Academy
- Saint Columban College
