= St. Jude College Dasmariñas Cavite =

Private college in Cavite, Philippines

PHINMA St. Jude College Dasmariñas
- Type: Private, nonsectarian
- Established: October 1999; 26 years ago
- Academic affiliation: PHINMA Education Network
- Students: 4,300+ enrolled (2025)
- Address: Carlos Trinidad Avenue Salitran IV, Dasmariñas, Cavite, 4114, Philippines; 14°20′33″N 120°57′46″E
- Location in Dasmariñas, Cavite

PHINMA St. Jude College Dasmariñas Cavite Inc. is a private non-sectarian institution in the city of Dasmariñas, Philippines.

Since 2024, the institution has been a member of the PHINMA Education Network and offers Senior High School and undergraduate degree programs.

== History ==
Responding to the need to bring quality education to the rural areas, Saint Jude College established its first extension school at URC Avenue, Salitran IV, City of Dasmariñas Cavite. In October 23, 1999, Saint Jude College Dasmariñas Cavite Inc. inaugurated a two-storey building with 10 classrooms for pre-school, elementary and high school. It started with 35 students and later expanded to hundreds and then thousand to include enrollees in the tertiary level. With the continuing increase in enrollment, a five-storey building was constructed in addition to the two-storey building.

In December 2024, the college was acquired by PHINMA Education. In 2025, PHINMA Education Network's subsidiary Phinma Education Holdings Inc. completed the P431.8 million acquisition of Saint Jude College's land and buildings coupled with full payment of outstanding obligations.

== College department ==
St. Jude College Cavite has a college department offering tertiary academic programs such as Radiologic Technology, Nursing, Business Administration, Computer Science, Accountancy, Secondary Education Major in English, Filipino, Elementary Education, Psychology, and Hospitality Management.

== Achievements ==
Last July 2015 examination for Radiologic Technology, St. Jude College Dasmariñas Cavite Inc. marks its history for getting the TOP spot in the entire Philippines. Patrick D. Agaloos made a legacy for them, he got the highest rank among thousands examiners of that one-day event.

May 2015 Board Examination for Nursing they got 100% passing rate for first timers. This proves that St. Jude College is one of the leading quality education provider in Cavite and in the entire Philippines.
