= Holy Trinity College of General Santos City =

Private college in General Santos, Philippines

- Former names: Albano Piano School; Holy Trinity School
- Motto: "Living and Learning to a greener future"
- Type: Private non-profit, non-stock corporation and co-educational Basic and Higher Education institution
- Established: 1984
- Founders: BGen. Consejo S. Albano Ed.D (Principal Founder); Gertrudes T. Albano (Principal Founder); Atty. Josemar T. Albano (Founding Member); Rosalyn T. Albano (Founding Member); Rey T. Albano, Ph.D (Founding Member); Marylone A. Canlas (Founding Member)
- Chairman: Atty. Josemar T. Albano, JD, MA, MM
- President: Rey T. Albano, Ph.D Ed. Management
- Vice-president: Atty. Josemar T. Albano JD, MA, MM (VP for Administration); Marylone A. Canlas (VP for Finance)
- Students: 6,652
- Location: General Santos, South Cotabato, Philippines; 6°06′48″N 125°10′07″E
- Campus: Daproza Avenue (Undergraduates and Graduates) Balagtas Street (Grade School and High school) Total land area: approx. 5 hectares (incl. separate expansions)
- Colors: Green and White
- Nickname: Wildcat/Trinitarian
- Mascot: Philippine Wildcat
- Website: www.htcgsc.edu.ph
- Location in Mindanao Location in the Philippines

The Holy Trinity College of General Santos City is a school in General Santos, Philippines. It is a non-sectarian school duly registered in the Securities and Exchange Commission, through its Davao City office. Holy Trinity College of General Santos was established by the Albano Family, as a Pre-school in 1984 and registered as a College in 1989.

== History ==
The school was envisioned in the early 1980s by BGen. Consejo S. Albano and his wife Gertrudes Roxas Trinidad-Albano began as a piano school, then called The Albano Piano School, with lessons conducted by their daughter, Rosalyn T. Albano. With full support from their children, Rey and Marylone Albano, and with financial assistance provided by then Capt. Josemar T. Albano, who was then working overseas as captain on ocean-going vessels, the foundation stone of the school was laid on March 28, 1984, on the occasion of Josemar Albano's birthday.

In 1984, the Holy Trinity Preschool started with 28 children in the family home of the Albanos with Gertrudes as the school head and Rosalyn as the teacher. In 1986, the school opened primary Grades 1-3 and the name of the school was changed to Holy Trinity School. Merlinda Ortega became the first full-time faculty of the school. A parcel of land acquired through the financing of Capt. Josemar Albano allowed the construction of a new building for the primary grades while the original preschool structure was renovated. Rey Albano also joined his mother and sister in the administration of the school, acting as the school's registrar. In 1987, Grade 4-6 were opened to complete the elementary program with more classrooms built to provide for the demand. The next year, in 1988, the High School Department opened enrolling 196 students for the pioneer batch, thus allowing Holy Trinity School to offer the complete Basic Education program.

SY 1989-1990, the school acquired legal personality as Holy Trinity College of General Santos City Inc. when it was registered with the SEC on May 21, 1990. The following degrees were initially offered:

- Bachelor of Science in Criminology
- Bachelor in Secondary Education
- Bachelor in Elementary Education, and
- Bachelor of Science in Commerce (with the inclusion of Junior Secretarial Course).

The college department started with an enrollment of 124 students with Capt. Josemar T. Albano retired from the seas to become the first president of Holy Trinity College together with BGen. Consejo S. Albano serving as the first Chairman of the Board of Trustees. The school continued to add more college courses to its program offering more learning and job opportunities for the local population.

In 1995, the graduate school was opened initially with two post-undergraduate courses of Master of Arts in Educational Management and Master of Arts in Guidance Counseling.

In 1996, a new four-story building was constructed to accommodate the Basic Education students and to allow for the creation of many facilities including the library and laboratories. A two-story building was also constructed to serve as a centralized comfort room for the students and staff.

In 1997, Capt. Josemar T. Albano stepped down as president to become the Vice President for Administration to focus on his law studies. He relinquished his position to BGen. Consejo S. Albano, Ed.D.

In 2001, another building was erected to house the chapel, canteen, as well as more classrooms and laboratories.

== Courses offered ==
In accordance with CHED Memo Order #41 Series of 2008, Holy Trinity College of General Santos has been recognized by the Institutional Quality Assurance through Monitoring and Evaluation (IQuAME) of the Commission on Higher Education (Philippines) (CHED) as a Developing Institution in the Philippines. The college courses are also accredited by ACSCU-AAI.

=== Graduate School Programs ===
- Master of Science in Criminal Justice with Specialization in Criminology Education
- Master of Arts in Education (Accredited Level II)
  - Educational Management
  - Educational Administration
  - English
  - Filipino
  - Mathematics
  - Physical Education
- Post-Baccalaureate Diploma in Alternative Learning System

=== College of Arts and Sciences ===
- Bachelor of Arts in Communication
- Bachelor of Arts (Accredited Level II)
  - Community Development
  - English Language Study
  - Political Science
- Bachelor of Science in Exercise in Sports Science
  - Fitness and Sports Management

=== College of Business Management and Accountancy ===
- Bachelor of Science in Accountancy
- Bachelor of Science in Accounting Information System
- Bachelor of Science in Accounting Technology
- Bachelor of Science in Business Administration (Accredited Level II)
  - Financial Management
  - Marketing Management
  - Human Resource Development Management
- Bachelor of Science in Hospitality Management
- Bachelor of Science in Management Accounting
- Bachelor of Science in Office Management
- Bachelor of Science in Office Administration
  - Office Management
- Bachelor of Science in Tourism Management

=== College of Engineering and Technical Education ===
- Associate in Computer Technology
- Bachelor of Science in Computer Engineering
- Bachelor of Science in Computer Science
- Bachelor of Science in Information Technology

=== College of Criminal Justice Education ===
- Bachelor of Science in Criminology (Accredited Level II)
- Bachelor of Science in Criminology-ETEEAP
- Bachelor of Forensic Science
- Bachelor in Industrial Security Management

=== College of Teacher Education ===
- Bachelor of Elementary Education (Accredited Level III)
- Bachelor of Culture and Arts Education
- Bachelor of Science in Exercise in Sports Science
  - Fitness and Sports and Management
- Bachelor of Physical Educations
  - School P.E.
  - Sports and Wellness Management
- Bachelor of Secondary Education (Accredited Level II)
  - English
  - Filipino
  - Mathematics
  - Science
- Bachelor of Technical-Vocational Education
  - Computer Programming
  - Electrical Technology
  - Food Service Management
- Bachelor of Technology and Livelihood Technology (BTLEd)
  - Home Economics
  - Information and Communication Technology

=== School of Tech-Voch Education and Training (TVET) Programs ===
- Automotive Servicing NC I
- Automotive Servicing NC II
- Bartending NC II
- Bread and Pastry Production NC II
- Bookkeeping NC III
- Carpentry NC II
- Computer System Servicing NC II (with STAR Award)
- Cookery NC II
- Driving NC II
- Electrical Installation and Maintenance NC II
- Electrical Installation and Maintenance NC III
- Electronics Product Assembly Servicing NC III
- Food and Beverages Services NC II
- Housekeeping NC II
- Masonry NC I
- Masonry NC II
- Shielded Metal Arc Welding NC I
- Shielded Metal Arc Welding NC II

=== Diploma Courses (PQF 5) ===
- Diploma in Computer Engineering
- Diploma in Computer Engineering Technology
- Diploma in Tourism Management

== People ==
- Gerald Anderson, Filipino-American film and television actor, commercial model, and TV producer. He also played for the high school basketball varsity team of Holy Trinity College of General Santos City, where he was named MVP of an interschool tournament participated by most of the high schools in the Soccsksargen area.
