= University of Luzon =

Private university in Pangasinan, Philippines

- Pamantasan ng Luzon (Filipino)
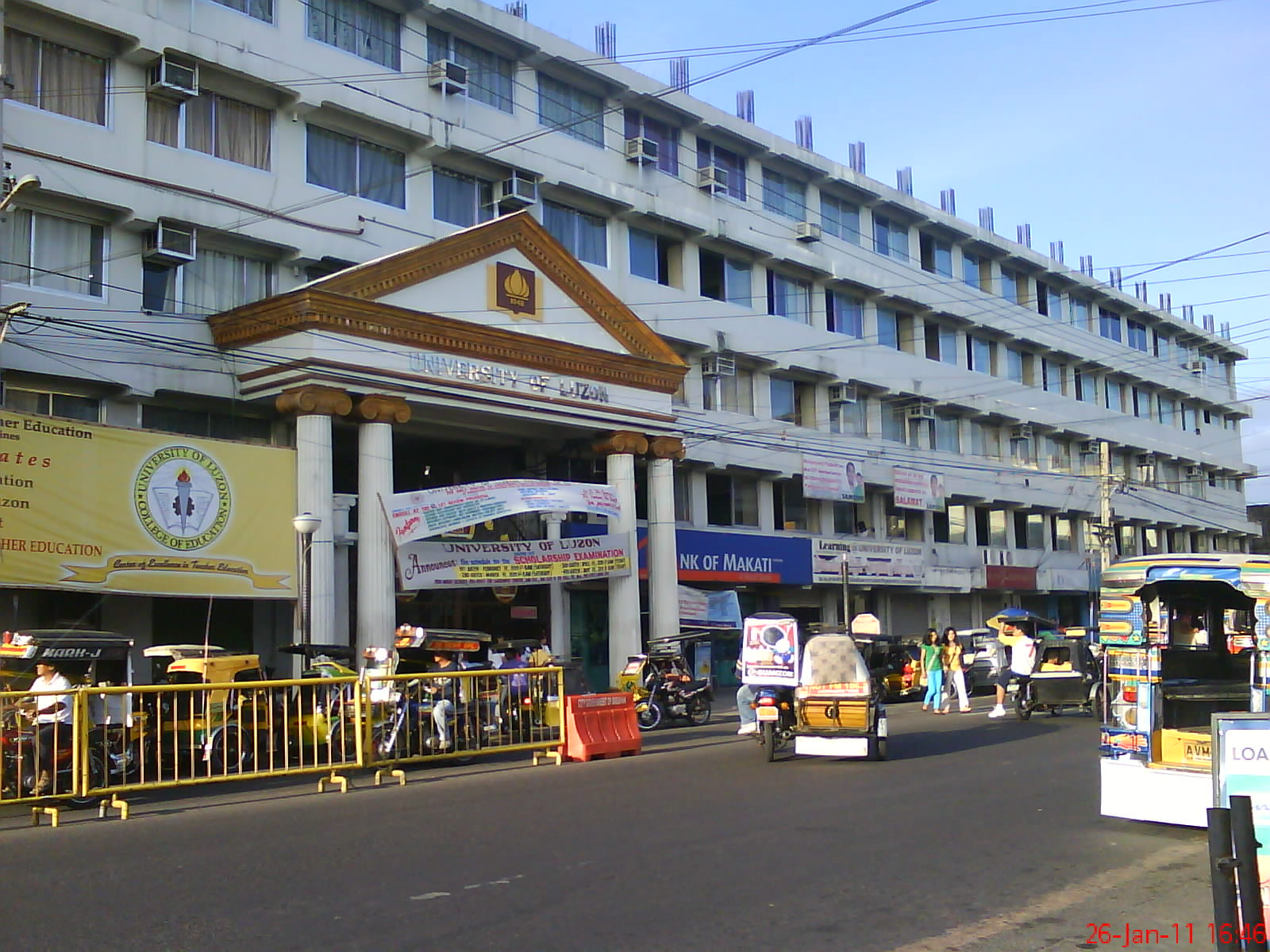
- The university in 2011
- Former names: Luzon College of Commerce and Business Administration (1948-1952); Luzon Colleges (1952-2002)
- Motto: Perecias y Valias
- Motto in English: Skills and Values
- Type: Private Non-sectarian Research Coeducational Higher education institution
- Established: 1948
- Founders: Atty. Luis F. Samson, Sr. Atty. Liberato Ll. Reyna, Sr., Dean Basilio Fernandez Dean Servillano Romasanta
- Academic affiliations: PACUCOA APSCU
- Chairman: Atty. Liberato Ll C. Reyna Jr.
- President: Dr. Luis "Chito" M. Samson Jr.
- Vice-president: Dr. Aurora Samson-Reyna (VP for Academic Affairs)
- Location: Perez Boulevard; Dagupan, Pangasinan, Philippines; 16°02′23″N 120°20′09″E
- Campus: Urban Main campus (Dagupan); Satellite campus (Pozorrubio)
- Colors: Maroon and Gold
- Nickname: Golden Tigers
- Sporting affiliations: MNCAA, PRISAA
- Mascot: Bald Tiger
- Website: www.ul.edu.ph
- Location in Luzon Location in the Philippines

The University of Luzon is a private university located in Dagupan, Philippines.

== History ==
In 1948, Atty. Luis F. Samson, Sr. gathered his friends (Liberato LI. Reyna, Servillano B. Romasanta, Basilio F. Fernandez, Moises A.Maramba, Isidro Z. Tandoc, Jose D. Fenoy, Ruperto Z. Tandoc, Catalino C. Coquia, Federico I. Cervas, Victorino C. Daroya, Vicente de Leon, Constancio Ancheta, Pedro B. Pinero and Brigido Martinez) together to design the blueprint of the then Luzon College of Commerce and Business Administration (LCCBA). Atty. Luis F. Samson has served as the school president since the foundation of the college. The initial enrolment was 243 students.

In 1952, LCCBA was renamed Luzon Colleges (LC). The Commission on Higher Education granted university status to the Luzon Colleges in 2002.

The university has five PACUCOA Level III- Reaccredited programs, namely:

- 2006: Criminology,
- Teacher Education programs (Elementary Education and Secondary Education),
- 2007: Commerce and Liberal Arts.

On July 14, 2008, the UL College of Criminology was identified by CHED as the first and the only Center of Excellence in Criminology Education in the country. In March 2008, the UL College of Education was certified as a Center of Training by CHED, Department of Education and the Professional Regulation Commission. The Liberal Arts, Commerce and Education (LACOMED) programs of the university are now in preparation for bids for Centers of Excellence Status.

The school Year 2008-2009 saw the implementation of web-enhanced learning for English, Mathematics, Science and Nursing through the introduction of E- Learning in campus. UL was the first in the region to adopt this program. The UL Pozorrubio Campus was opened in June 2008 with an enrollment of 46 students.
