= Veejay Pre =

Filipino basketball player

UP Fighting Maroons
- Position: Power forward / small forward
- League: UAAP

Personal information
- Born: July 3, 2005 (age 21)
- Listed height: 6 ft 5 in (1.96 m)

Career information
- High school: FEU Diliman (Quezon City)
- College: FEU (2024); UP (from 2026)

Career highlights
- AsiaBasket First Team (2024 International)

Francis Veejay Pre (born July 3, 2005) is a Filipino college basketball player.

== Career ==
=== High school ===
Pre played for the FEU–D Baby Tamaraws in the University Athletic Association of the Philippines (UAAP).

=== Collegiate ===
==== FEU Tamaraws ====
Pre committed to remain in the Far Eastern University (FEU) to play for the FEU Tamaraws in the UAAP in 2024. Pre debuted for the FEU senior team coached by Sean Chambers in UAAP Season 87. The FEU Tamaraws finished sixth and missed the Final Four but Pre was named as the Rookie of the Year.

By April 2025, rumors have circulated that Pre is being recruited by other UAAP schools. He nevertheless took part in the UAAP 3x3 championship

==== Move to UP ====
The University of the Philippines and De La Salle University insists to FEU athletics director Mark Molina on May 8, 2025, that they do not plan to recruit Pre. Molina alleged that Pre's family, especially his father are pressuring the collegiate player to leave FEU.

Pre eventually decided to move to UP heading to his family's advice. According to UP they "respected" FEU and only formally reached to Pre's camp on May 19 after Pre informed FEU his decision to leave.

==== UP Fighting Maroons ====
Pre had to sit out UAAP Season 88 to serve residency requirements for the 2025–26 academic year. He will be eligible to play for the UP Fighting Maroons starting Season 89 in 2026.

=== National team ===
In September 2025, Pre was reportedly being considered for the Philippine national team's campaign in the 2025 SEA Games by head coach Norman Black. Black cites Pre's ability to play multiple positions as well as his availability since he is serving residency with UP after his departure from FEU. He was included in the finalized roster released in December 2025.

== Personal life ==
Pre is from Floridablanca, Pampanga.
