= Fil-Am Nation Select =

- Formation: December 2019; 6 years ago
- Founders: Alex Cabagnot; Cris Gopez
- Location: Los Angeles, United States
- Region served: Australia, North America, Europe, United Arab Emirates
- Parent organization: Fil-Foreign Nation Select
- Affiliations: Fil-Can Nation Select (Canada)

Fil-Am Nation Select is a sports agency based in the United States. It also maintains a basketball team which plays in the Philippine-based NBTC League.

== Background ==
Fil-Am Nation Select was established by former Philippine Basketball Association (PBA) player Alex Cabagnot along with his cousin Cris Gopez in December 2019. It was set up as a means to provide a platform for United States-based players with Filipino lineage, male or female, to showcase their skills so they could be scouted by leagues or possibly play for the Philippine national team.

Fil-Am Nation in partnership with the Samahang Basketbol ng Pilipinas, the Philippines' national basketball federation, has been scouting players for the Philippine women's national team via try-outs since 2020.

They also recruit players for baseball, ice hockey, and volleyball. The organization also do consultancy services for players as well as assistance in Philippine passport acquisition-related processes.

== In basketball leagues ==
Fil-Am Nation Select
- League: NBTC League
- Head coach: Byron Scott (men's)
- Championships: 2 men's championships; 2023–24 NBTC Division I; 2024–25 NBTC Division I; 2 NBTC finals appearances

The Fil-Am Nation Select women's team won the 2023 Smart-NBTC Girls Have Next title at the expense of NU Nazareth School.

The Fil-Am Nation Select men's team lost the 2022–23 NBTC League season finals against NU Nazareth School. However in the 2023–24 NBTC League season, they won the title defeating Adamson Baby Falcons in the finals.

The 2025 squad coached by Byron Scott, retained the title.

== Affiliated organizations ==
A bigger organization, the Fil-Foreign Nation Select is meant to serve Filipinos of foreign descent. As of 2020, there are two subsidiary organizations; Fil-Am Nation Select and a Fil-Can Nation Select with the latter catering to Filipino Canadians.

== See also ==
- Strong Group Athletics
- Gintong Alay
