= National Basketball Training Center =

Grassroots basketball program in the Philippines

- National Basketball Training Center
- Abbreviation: NBTC
- Formation: 2007; 19 years ago
- Founder: Eric Altamirano; Alex Compton
- Type: Grassroots
- Headquarters: Quezon City, Metro Manila, Philippines
- Region served: Philippines
- Services: Sports training (basketball)
- Program Director: Eric Altamirano
- Training Director: Alex Compton

The National Basketball Training Center (NBTC) is the official grassroots basketball program of the Samahang Basketbol ng Pilipinas Inc. Its objective is to identify, prepare, and develop young players. It started out as a training program for the Philippines' national basketball teams. They then developed the NBTC League, a nationwide tournament that features the best high school teams from all over the country and since 2016, has also involved international teams. The NBTC also held a Coaches' Convention until 2019, but is now set to be revived in 2024.

== History ==
The program was established in 2007 by the BAP-Samahang Basketbol ng Pilipinas Inc., as a training program for boys and girls who could compete in the 2010 Youth Olympics. Eric Altamirano and Alex Compton were appointed to head the program, which included scouting the US and Canada to look for players who could join the program. They had experience running a basketball program, as they had also organized a Nike Elite Camp. They also did skills training camps in three different cities.

Altamirano and Compton wanted to reach out to more rural areas, so they thought of developing a school-based league. In 2008, the NBTC Developmental League, a 16-and-under boys' tournament, was formed, with Altamirano serving as its tournament director. 29 teams participated in the inaugural tournament. During the tournament, certain players were called up for the SEABA Youth tournament pool. They also gave out training modules that were used in different basketball camps around the country. A team of NBTC players also placed fourth in the 2009 FIBA Asia Under-16 Championship.

In 2011, the NBTC launched a youth basketball program for public school students ages 14 to 17. They also continued to conduct more workshops, and produce more training modules and instructional videos.

In 2012, the NBTC set up a Jr. Elite League, for grade school players 12-and-under, which AMA Computer University won. They also signed a partnership deal with the MVP Sports Foundation. With another partnership with SM in 2016, the NBTC got more media exposure.

In 2015, the NBTC organized a 3x3 tournament. It wasn't held again until the 2018–19 season of the NBTC National Championship in hopes of helping the country accumulate points in order to increase its FIBA 3x3 rank and qualify for the 2020 Tokyo Olympics.

In 2017, they also put together a basketball camp known as the "Elite 60". The following year, three campers were invited to the Batang Gilas pool for the 2018 FIBA Under-17 World Cup.

The NBTC's operations were put on hold in the middle of the 2019–20 season of their league due to the COVID-19 pandemic. They were able to resume operations in 2022 with the Global Games, a series of international qualifiers for Filipinos in different parts of the world. In 2023, they launched a girls' high school tournament, with Mau Belen as tournament director and featured eight teams. Fil-Nation Select-USA won the inaugural tournament.

== NBTC League ==
In 2008, the NBTC Developmental League, a 16-and-under tournament, was formed, with Altamirano serving as its tournament director. 29 teams participated in the inaugural tournament, with 24 from Luzon, Visayas, and Mindanao, and five from the NCR. Since then, hundreds of high school teams and clubs from all over the country have joined as well as several teams from overseas. Through the tournament, local and international basketball talents have been discovered and developed.

The tournament also holds the NBTC All-Star Game, which features 24–30 of the best high school players in the country. In earlier years, tryouts were held to see who would take part in the event. Beginning in 2018, the top 24 high school players based on the NBTC's rankings were chosen to play in the event. The event also features a slam dunk contest, three-point shootout, and skills challenge.

== Coaches' Convention ==
In the early years of the NBTC, Altamirano and Compton traveled to different provinces throughout the country to conduct clinics for players and coaches. After realizing it would be better to bring the coaches to Manila, they held a three-day National Coaches' Convention in 2011 which was attended by 200 coaches and included speakers such as Tim Cone, Chot Reyes, and Ricky Dandan. Attendance to the convention is mandatory for coaches participating in the NBTC League. In 2012, it became a joint project of the NBTC and the MVP Sports Foundation.

In the last conference held in 2019, over 1,500 coaches attended, including those from public schools in partnership with DepEd. Speakers at that year's conference included Metta World Peace, Baldwin, and Rob Beveridge. Another convention was scheduled for 2020, but was cancelled due to the COVID-19 pandemic. It is now set to be revived in March 2024 in partnership with the SBP Coaches' Academy.

== Sponsors ==
The NBTC was first sponsored mainly by Nokia and TAO Corp. In 2011, Energen sponsored the public high school program, while Seaoil sponsored the private high school program. Seaoil sponsored the NBTC for three years. In 2015, with Seaoil letting go of sponsorship, SM Sports Development took over as principal sponsor. Chooks-to-Go joined SM as a title sponsor in 2019.
