= Carl Tamayo =

Filipino basketball player (born 2001)

No. 33 – Changwon LG Sakers
- Position: Power forward
- League: KBL

Personal information
- Born: February 13, 2001 (age 25) Talisay, Cebu, Philippines
- Listed height: 6 ft 8 in (2.02 m)
- Listed weight: 202 lb (92 kg)

Career information
- High school: Adamson (Manila); NSNU (Manila)
- College: UP (2021–2022)
- Playing career: 2023–present

Career history
- 2023–2024: Ryukyu Golden Kings
- 2024–present: Changwon LG Sakers

Career highlights
- KBL champion (2025); B.League champion (2023); UAAP champion (2021); 2× UAAP Mythical Team (2021, 2022); UAAP Rookie of the Year (2021)

Carl Vincent Cabellon Tamayo (born February 13, 2001) is a Filipino professional basketball player for the Changwon LG Sakers of the Korean Basketball League (KBL). He played college basketball for the UP Fighting Maroons of the University Athletic Association of the Philippines (UAAP). He has won championships in the juniors and seniors division of the UAAP, and has played for the Philippine national team multiple times. He is listed at 6 feet 8 inches (2.02 m).

== Early life ==
Tamayo was born in Talisay, Cebu, to Simpoy Tamayo, a former basketball player for University of Southern Philippines Foundation (USPF) and Hermenia Tamayo (née Cabellon), a former volleyball player for Southwestern University (SWU). Days after he was born, his father died of a heart attack. He studied at Southwestern University for his primary education.

== High school career ==
=== Adamson Baby Falcons ===
Before basketball, Tamayo's sport was billiards. When he was 13 years old, he was discovered by coach Goldwin Monteverde, who recruited him to play for Adamson High School in Manila. Monteverde did this by promising him a photo opportunity with his favorite PBA player, June Mar Fajardo. Tamayo won Juniors Rookie of the Year for UAAP Season 78 as he averaged five points, 5.2 rebounds, and 1.4 blocks. In the first game of Season 79, he had 14 points and 11 rebounds. Unfortunately, most of their wins that season were forfeited as they fielded an ineligible player in guard Encho Serrano. In his final game for them, he had 13 points and 13 rebounds.

=== NU Bullpups ===
==== Red-shirt season ====
After that season, Tamayo, along with his teammate Gerry Abadiano, followed Coach Monteverde in transferring from Adamson to Nazareth School of National University. Him and Abadiano had to serve residency for Season 80. The NU Bullpups then won tournaments such as the NBTC League, the 2018 Palarong Pambansa (in which he made the Mythical Five along with his teammates Abadiano and Terrence Fortea), and the 2018 ASEAN School Games.

==== Season 81: First championship ====
The Bullpups opened their Season 81 campaign with a win over the FEU Baby Tamaraws, in which Tamayo scored 18 points, 10 rebounds, an assist and a block in 14 minutes off the bench. All season long, he played through a right ankle sprain. In his winning return against the Ateneo Blue Eaglets, he had 13 points, 10 rebounds, and three blocks. In their rematch in the second round of eliminations, he made a clutch and-one off a putback to give NU the lead and they eventually won again. They went on to sweep the second round. It was also during this time that he found himself on top of the NBTC UAAP 24 high school rankings. They met Ateneo again in the Finals, where in Game 1, he had 15 points and 12 rebounds to lead NU to the win. With Kevin Quiambao, they combined for 29 points and 25 rebounds and limited Ateneo's star center Kai Sotto to just 16 points. In Game 2, he had another double-double of 13 points and 10 rebounds, and NU won the juniors' championship for the first time since 2016. He was awarded Finals MVP.

==== Season 82: Second championship ====
Before the start of Season 82, NU successfully defended its ASEAN School Games title, in which they defeated Indonesia for the gold medal.

During the season, they swept the elimination rounds, earning an outright spot in the Finals. The Bullpups then swept the Baby Tamaraws in the Finals, with Tamayo leading them in Game 2 with 26 points and 22 rebounds. He finished his high school career with another Finals MVP. He also finished second in the NBTC 24 rankings, with only San Beda forward Rhayyan Amsali ahead of him.

== College career ==
=== UP Fighting Maroons ===
On August 1, 2020, it was announced that both Tamayo and Abadiano had committed to the UP Fighting Maroons. He cited his aunt, a University of the Philippines graduate, as one of the reasons he chose UP. His arrival led to premature comparisons to center Benjie Paras, who led UP to a UAAP title in 1986. Several weeks later, their high school coach Monteverde resigned from NU, who was supposed to be the head coach for the senior team of NU. Another former teammate, Cyril Gonzales, left Mapúa to join them at UP. In 2021, two more of Tamayo's former teammates reunited with him at UP, with guards Fortea and Harold Alarcon also committing to UP. That year, Coach Monteverde was named head coach for the Maroons, reuniting him with many of his former players.

==== Rookie season: UAAP seniors' championship ====
Tamayo made his UAAP seniors' debut in Season 84 in a loss to the Ateneo Blue Eagles with 13 points and 10 rebounds. In UP's 5th straight win, he had nine points and 11 rebounds against the La Salle Green Archers. They extended the win streak to seven against the NU Bulldogs, with him scoring 21 points, 10 rebounds, and three steals. Their win streak ended at eight with a loss to the Adamson Soaring Falcons. They bounced back with a win over La Salle, in which he had a career-high 23 points with 11 rebounds. They faced La Salle again in the Final Four. In Game 2, with UP down by 14 points with seven minutes in the game, he scored 12 of his 19 points in that period that led to UP having a 76–74 lead with 21.4 seconds remaining. La Salle guard Evan Nelle had a chance to tie the game with a layup, but it missed which Tamayo rebounded. He then made two free throws to seal a 78–74 win that sent UP back to the Finals. He finished the game with 19 points, 10 rebounds, four steals, and three assists. This set them up for a best-of-three Finals match against defending champions Ateneo. In Game 1, he had 10 points, nine rebounds, five steals, three assists, and two blocks in the overtime victory. Before Game 2, he was awarded UAAP Rookie of the Year. He also made it to the Season 84 Mythical Five, along with his teammate Zavier Lucero. In Game 2, he had 18 points, 12 rebounds, and two steals, but Ateneo won the game. In Game 3, he only had six points, but UP won the game with JD Cagulangan making the game-winning shot. This ended UP's 36-year title drought and made him a champion once again.

==== Sophomore and final season: Runner-up finish ====
Tamayo started the title defense campaign with a close win over the Green Archers in which he produced 18 points, 19 rebounds and two clutch free throws. Against the FEU Tamaraws, he had 16 points (with eight coming in the fourth quarter) as the Maroons scored their third straight win. The Maroons suffered their first loss of the season against the Bulldogs, despite his 17 points and 11 rebounds. In a rematch against Ateneo, he had a costly turnover in the last 20 seconds of regulation, but he bounced back in order by scoring six of his 20 points in overtime and got UP the win. He then had 13 points, seven rebounds, and four steals in a win over the UE Red Warriors, but he sprained his ankle in the final minute of that game. Coach Monteverde said after the game that the injury was minor. He was able to play the next game as UP coasted to an easy win over the UST Growling Tigers. At the end of the first round, he was in the top 5 in the MVP race.

In the second round, Tamayo scored 18 points in a rout of Adamson. They continued their win streak until the Green Archers stopped their streak at seven, despite his 14 points and seven rebounds. He then led all scorers with 19 points to go along with his nine rebounds as UP beat UST once again. UP made the Finals once again by beating NU in the Final Four. The Maroons won Game 1 despite him being limited to seven points, four rebounds, two assists, one steal, and one block. Before Game 2, he won a spot in the UAAP Mythical Five and P30,000 for the Lazada Swag Player of the Season, a fan award. His teammate Malick Diouf was also on the Mythical Team and won the MVP award. Ateneo however, bounced back in Game 2. He only had 11 points and nine rebounds in Game 3 as despite the Maroons' efforts, the Blue Eagles won the championship.

On January 10, 2023, Tamayo announced that he will leave UP to play in the Japanese B.League.

== Professional career ==
=== Ryukyu Golden Kings (2023–2024) ===
On January 11, 2023, Tamayo signed with Ryukyu Golden Kings of the Japanese B.League. He first got to play for them during the EASL Champions Week. He scored his first points in the B.League during a win over the Nagoya Diamond Dolphins. He got limited playing time in his rookie season, but was still able to win a championship in the 2022–23 season.

In his second season, Tamayo continued getting limited playing time but was still able to develop as a player. In Ryukyu's opening win, he had 15 points against the Saga Ballooners, then followed it up with 10 rebounds in a winning rematch against them. He got to play in the 2024 Asia All-Stars vs Rising Stars game, in which he the Asia All-Stars to the win with 18 points. He was released by the team on January 18, 2024, per his request. The lack of playing time for Tamayo was cited as the reason for the mutual decision.

=== Changwon LG Sakers (2024–present) ===
On June 5, 2024, Tamayo signed with the Changwon LG Sakers in the Korean Basketball League (KBL). In his first game with them, he contributed eight points, seven rebounds, two steals, one assist, and one block in a win over the Daegu KOGAS Pegasus. He then followed it up with 16 points, five rebounds and four assists as they won back to back games. The team went on to win eight straight games. However, he had to sit out for a while due to a groin injury.

Three games later, Tamayo returned with 17 points seven rebounds, and three assists as he made a clutch jumper with 1:19 remaining in a win over the Goyang Sono Skygunners. In their next game, he scored a career-high 37 points as he made all of his 15 shots from inside the arc along with seven rebounds and three assists in a loss to the Seoul Samsung Thunders. He followed it up with 31 points and eight rebounds in a win over the Anyang Jung Kwan Jang Red Boosters. For his play, he was selected as the MVP of the third round, the first Changwon player to be given the honor since Assem Marei during the 2023–24 season, and the first Asian import to receive this honor.

Tamayo went on to help Changwon reach the finals with a sweep of the Ulsan Hyundai Mobis Phoebus in the semis. In the first two games of the finals, he led the team with 24 and 27 points respectively. Changwon even held a 3–0 lead in the series over the Seoul SK Knights. However, Seoul went on to win the next three games, forcing a Game 7. In Game 7, Changwon fended off Seoul to win its first title in 28 years. With the championship, Tamayo became the first Filipino import to win a title both in the Japanese B.League and KBL. The following season, they were eliminated in the semifinals by Goyang.

== National team career ==
=== Junior national team ===
Tamayo was named to the "23-for-2023" pool, which was composed of young players for the 2023 FIBA World Cup. He, along with other members of that pool, played in the 2018 Filoil Flying V Preseason Premier Cup.

Tamayo then played for the Philippines in the 2018 FIBA Under-17 Basketball World Cup. He injured his foot in that tournament, causing him to miss the 2018 FIBA Under-18 Asian Championship.

In 2019, Tamayo played in that year's FIBA Under-19 World Cup. His best game came in a win over China, in which he had 20 points and six rebounds. He also represented the Philippines in the 2019 FIBA 3x3 U-18 Asia Cup.

=== Senior national team ===
In 2021, Tamayo made his Gilas seniors debut against Korea in the 2022 FIBA Asia Cup qualifiers. In his debut, he scored 10 points on 4-of-5 shooting to spark Gilas to the win. However, he injured his ankle in their next win against Indonesia. This caused him to miss the rematch against Korea and he focused on rehabbing his ankle instead. He was able to play in that year's OQT.

The following year, he was ruled out of the February window of the 2023 FIBA World Cup Asian qualifiers. He rejoined the team for the third window. In the loss to New Zealand, he had a game-high 16 points to go with five rebounds against four turnovers. He rolled his ankle in that game, but still managed to play in the win against India, wherein he had three steals to go with nine points and nine rebounds while limiting his turnovers to just two. He was then included for the 2022 FIBA Asia Cup. In that tournament, they failed to qualify for the quarterfinals. He was among the leaders of the team in points and rebounds. In the fourth window of qualifying, he played in the loss to Lebanon, but was not able to play against Saudi Arabia due to commitments to the UP Maroons. For the fifth window, he was called-up once again, but this time declined as he needed to recover from an injury he sustained during UAAP Season 85. He was called up to the national pool for the FIBA World Cup, but tendonitis forced him to beg off the pool.

Tamayo was included in the 21-man pool for the 2023 FIBA World Cup. However, he begged off due to injury. He made his return in 2024 during the first window of the 2025 FIBA Asia Cup qualifiers. Against Chinese Taipei, he scored 11 points. He also played in that year's OQT. In a win over Hong Kong, he scored 16 points and also contributed five rebounds. The following year, he played in the 2025 FIBA Asia Cup. In 2026, he suffered a Grade 2 ankle sprain in a win over Jordan.

== Player profile ==
At 6-foot-8, Tamayo plays the power forward and the center positions. Since high school, he has consistently gotten double-doubles. He has also held his own against taller centers, such as Kai Sotto.

Tamayo can also play the small forward position. This makes him able to play both forward positions. He has been working on his ball-handling, shooting skills, and reading plays at the three spot. He has been compared to Ranidel de Ocampo and Kerby Raymundo. Gilas head coach Chot Reyes compared him to Gilas mainstay Gabe Norwood. Former Gilas head coach Tab Baldwin has also viewed him as a wing player.

== Personal life ==
Tamayo's father was 6 ft 5 in (1.96 m) He has an older sister, Mia who is a model in Cebu and an older brother, Sam, who is into local politics in Talisay, Cebu. He has a girlfriend, Eunice Villota.

== Career statistics ==
Legend
GP	Games played	GS	Games started	MPG	Minutes per game
FG%	Field goal percentage	3P%	3-point field goal percentage	FT%	Free throw percentage
RPG	Rebounds per game	APG	Assists per game	SPG	Steals per game
BPG	Blocks per game	PPG	Points per game		Led the league

=== Domestic leagues ===
As of the end of the 2024–25 season

†	Denotes seasons in which Tamayo won the domestic league championship

Year	Team	League	GP	MPG	FG%	3P%	FT%	RPG	APG	SPG	BPG	PPG
2022–23†	(Japan) Ryukyu Golden Kings	B.League	16	7.8	.259	.259	.273	1.2	.2	.3	.1	2.5
2023–24	(Japan) Ryukyu Golden Kings	B.League	23	12.5	.456	.407	.545	2.5	.6	.3	.3	3.9
2024–25†	(South Korea) Changwon LG Sakers	KBL	60	27.2	.457	.302	.687	6.0	2.1	.9	.2	15.2
