= Jack Santiago =

Filipino basketball player and coach

Member of the Navotas City Council
- In office June 30, 2013 – June 30, 2022

Personal details
- Party: Partido Navoteño; PDP–Laban
- Basketball career

Personal information
- Listed height: 5 ft 10 in (1.78 m)
- Listed weight: 175 lb (79 kg)

Career information
- College: Mapúa
- PBA draft: 1994: 3rd round
- Drafted by: 7-Up Uncolas
- Playing career: 1996–2001
- Position: Point guard
- Number: 4, 5
- Coaching career: 2001–present

Career history

Playing
- 1996: Sunkist Orange Bottlers
- 1998–2001: Sta. Lucia Realtors

Coaching
- 2002–2009: De La Salle (assistant)
- 2011–2014: Air21 Express (assistant)
- 2015–2021: Adamson (assistant)
- 2015–2016: Pilipinas MX3 Kings
- 2022–2024: UE

Career highlights
- As player: PBA champion (2001 Governors'); As assistant coach: UAAP champion (2007)

Gerardo "Jack" Tojino Santiago is a Filipino former basketball player and coach who most recently served as head coach of UE Red Warriors.

== Basketball career ==
=== Playing ===
Santiago played for Mapua, and played with future PBA superstar Alvin Patrimonio. Santiago also played in PBA teams such as Sunkist Orange Juicers, and Sta. Lucia Realtors.

=== Coaching ===
Santiago previously served as lead assistant to Franz Pumaren in La Salle, Air21, and Adamson. Santiago was named as UE Red Warriors head coach on 2022. Santiago was suspended by the UAAP in 2022 after he instructed his players to intentionally harm Ricci Rivero of the UP Fighting Maroons.

== Political career ==
Santiago is councilor of Navotas from 2013 to 2022.

== Coaching record ==
=== Collegiate ===
| Season | Team | Elimination round | | | | | Playoffs | | | | |
| Season | Team | GP | W | L | PCT | Finish | GP | W | L | PCT | Results |
|---|---|---|---|---|---|---|---|---|---|---|---|
| 2021–22 | UE | 14 | 0 | 14 | .000 | 8th | — | — | — | — | Eliminated |
| 2022 | UE | 14 | 5 | 9 | .357 | 6th | — | — | — | — | Eliminated |
| 2023 | UE | 14 | 4 | 10 | .286 | 6th | — | — | — | — | Eliminated |
| 2024 | UE | 14 | 6 | 8 | .428 | 5th | — | — | — | — | Eliminated |
| Totals | | 42 | 9 | 33 | .214 | — | 0 | 0 | 0 | .000 | 0 championship |

| Preceded by Bong Tan | UE Red Warriors men's basketball head coach 2021-2024 | Succeeded by Chris Gavina |
