= Goldwin Monteverde =

Filipino basketball coach

UP Fighting Maroons
- Position: Head coach
- League: UAAP

Personal information
- Born: June 6, 1971 (age 55) Philippines

Career information
- High school: Uno High School (Manila)

Career history

Coaching
- 1993–2012: Saint Stephen's High School
- 2012–2018: Chiang Kai-shek College
- 2015–2017: Adamson HS
- 2018–2020: NSNU
- 2019: Batangas City Athletics
- 2021–present: UP

Career highlights
- As head coach: 2× UAAP men's champion (2022, 2024); 2× UAAP juniors' champion (2018, 2019); Filoil Flying V Cup champion (2023); As player: UAAP men's champion (1986)

Richard Goldwin Yu Monteverde (born June 6, 1971), sometimes spelled as Goldwyn, is a Filipino basketball coach currently serving as the head coach for the UP Fighting Maroons.

He formerly coached the NU Bullpups (National University's junior basketball team) and Adamson Baby Falcons (Adamson University's junior basketball team).

== Coaching career ==
=== High school ranks ===
Monteverde first coached in the high school level at Saint Stephen's High School in 1991. During this time, his assistant was Bonnie Tan, future NCAA winning coach of Letran Knights. Monteverde coached the "A" team of the school starting in 1993, and led them to five Metro Manila Tiong Lian Basketball League (MMTLBL) titles in the next decade. He then coached Chiang Kai-shek College in the MMTLBL and also led them into championships.

Monteverde coached the Adamson Baby Falcons and created a winning culture, with the Baby Falcons qualifying on his first season in 2015, then missing the playoffs in 2016. In 2017, Adamson won 13 games in 2016, but the UAAP reversed 11 of those wins as the league ruled Adamson player Encho Serrano to be ineligible, eliminating them from contention.

Monteverde then replaced Jeff Napa as NSNU Bullpups head coach. He led the Bullpups to three Finals appearances and two UAAP Juniors basketball championships from 2018 to 2020. He was elevated to the seniors' NU Bulldogs team in May 2020. However, several players from the Bulldogs parted ways with the team, all with the blessing of Monteverde. Weeks later, Monteverde resigned as Bulldogs coach without coaching a game.

=== UP Fighting Maroons ===
Monteverde was hired by the UP Fighting Maroons in 2021, replacing Bo Perasol who had been promoted to the front office of the team. Together with Carl Tamayo, his former player at NSNU Bullpups, they led the team to their first championship against the Ateneo Blue Eagles by a buzzer beater, the first title since 1986, back when Monteverde himself played. He coached UP in the next season Season 85 (2022), but lost in the finals. Monteverde led UP to another finals appearance the next year in Season 86 (2023), but lost to the De La Salle Green Archers. In Season 87 (2024), he successfully led UP in clinching the championship title defeating the De La Salle Green Archers.

== Coaching record ==
=== High school record ===
Season	Team	Finish	GP	W	L	PCT	PG	PW	PL	PCT	Results
2015	AdU	3rd	14	9	5	.643	2	0	2	.000	Stepladder round 1
2016	AdU	5th	14	7	7	.500	—	—	—	—	Missed playoffs
2017	AdU	8th	14	1	13	.071	—	—	—	—	Missed playoffs
2018	NSNU	2nd	14	11	3	.786	4	2	2	.500	Finals
2019	NSNU	1st	14	13	1	.929	3	3	0	1.000	Champion
2020	NSNU	1st	14	14	0	1.000	2	2	0	1.000	Champion
Totals			84	55	29	.655	11	7	4	.636	2 championships

=== Collegiate record ===
Season	Team	Finish	GP	W	L	PCT	PG	PW	PL	PCT	Results
2021	UP	2nd	14	12	2	.857	5	3	2	.600	Champion
2022	UP	2nd	14	11	3	.786	4	2	2	.500	Finals
2023	UP	1st	14	12	2	.857	4	2	2	.500	Finals
2024	UP	2nd	14	11	3	.786	4	3	1	.750	Champion
2025	UP	2nd	14	10	4	.786	4	2	2	.500	Finals
Totals			70	56	14	.800	21	12	9	.571	2 championships

== Personal life ==
Monteverde is the son of Regal Films founder Lily Monteverde and former San Beda Red Lion Leonardo “Remy” G. Monteverde (born December 25, 1937), who died on July 29, 2024. Monteverde's siblings include Winnie, Roselle Teo, Meme and Dondon.

Preceded by Bo Perasol	UP Fighting Maroons head coach 2021–present	Succeeded by incumbent
