= Malick Diouf =

Senegalese-Filipino basketball player (born 1999)

Abra Weavers
- Position: Center
- League: East Asia Super League

Personal information
- Born: 25 February 1999 (age 27)
- Listed height: 6 ft 11 in (2.11 m)

Career information
- College: CEU (until 2019); UP (2022–2023)
- Playing career: 2024–present

Career history
- 2024–2025: Pacific Caesar
- 2026–present: Abra Weavers

Career highlights
- UAAP champion (2022); UAAP Finals MVP (2021–22); UAAP Most Valuable Player (2022)

Maodo Malick Diouf (born 25 February 1999) is a Senegalese-born naturalized Filipino basketball player for the Abra Weavers in the East Asia Super League (EASL).

== Education ==
Diouf studied in the Philippines. He first attended the Centro Escolar University (CEU) before moving to the University of the Philippines Diliman in 2020.

== Career ==
=== College ===
Malick Diouf played for the CEU Scorpions. The team won the 2019 National Capital Region Athletic Association. The CEU Scorpions also played at the 2019 PBA D-League Aspirants' Cup where it finished as runners-up.

Diouf played for the UP Fighting Maroons at the basketball championship of the University Athletic Association of the Philippines (UAAP). He helped UP win the Season 84 in 2022 and was named finals MVP. He also was named season MVP for Season 85 but his school lost to Ateneo in that run's finals.

UP lost again in the finals to De La Salle in Season 86, though Diouf was named to the Mythical Team. He incurred an injury to his right wrist during his last playing year, and underwent surgery in December 2023.

=== Club ===
After graduating from UP Diliman, Diouf joined the Zamboanga Valientes to play in the 2024 The Asian Tournament in Macau.

In December 2024, Diouf was signed by the Pacific Caesar Surabaya of the Indonesian Basketball League in the lead up to the 2025 IBL season.

Diouf had a brief return with the Valientes at the 34th Dubai International Basketball Championship in early 2025.

On May 23, 2026, Diouf signed with the TNT Tropang 5G as a replacement import for Bol Bol. He was expected to play in TNT's game 3 of the 2026 PBA Commissioner's Cup semifinals. However the plan did not push through due to documentary requirements issues. Diouf is competing with Chris McCullough as Bol's possible replacement for game 4.

In September 2026, Diouf signed with the Maharlika Pilipinas Basketball League champions Abra Weavers for its East Asia Super League campaign, which Abra is joining as the Philippines' representative. Because of the MPBL's restrictions on players without Filipino descent, Diouf, despite holding a Philippine passport, can only play for Abra's EASL games.

=== 3x3 ===
Diouf also played 3x3 basketball. He played for the Mandaluyong SBP team at the 2025 Manila Challenger and the Kaohsiung City Challenger of the FIBA 3x3 Men's Pro Circuit in September and October 2025 respectively. His naturalization bid is linked to the Philippine national 3x3 team program.

== Personal life ==
Diouf is a devout Muslim from Senegal. Diouf is a naturalized Filipino citizen via Republic Act No. 12318 which lapsed into law on May 18, 2026. He took his oath of allegiance and acquired his Philippine passport by July 1, 2026.
