= UAAP Season 84 men's basketball tournament =

Basketball season

UAAP Season 84
- "Fully Alive. Champions for Life!"
- Host school: De La Salle University
Men's Finals	G1 (OT)	G2	G3 (OT)	Wins
Ateneo Blue Eagles	74	69	69	1
UP Fighting Maroons	81	66	72	2
- Duration: May 8 to 13, 2022
- Arena(s): SM Mall of Asia Arena
- Finals MVP: Malick Diouf
- Winning coach: Goldwin Monteverde (1st title)
- Semifinalists: De La Salle Green Archers; FEU Tamaraws
- TV network(s): Cignal TV: TV5; One Sports; UAAP Varsity Channel

The UAAP Season 84 men's basketball tournament is the basketball event of the University Athletic Association of the Philippines for its 2021–22 school year. This was the first tournament since 2019, the year before the COVID-19 pandemic hit the Philippines. The women's, boys' and girls' basketball tournaments were not held this season, also due to the pandemic.

== Tournament format ==
The usual UAAP tournament format for tournaments having all eight teams was followed:

- Double round eliminations; top four teams advance to the playoffs
  - If there is a tie for second or fourth, a one-game playoff will be held
- If a team wins all elimination round games:
  - #1 seed advance to the finals outright
  - #2 seed advance to the second round of the stepladder semifinals with the twice-to-beat advantage; winner advances to the finals
  - #3 and #4 seeds advance to the first round of the stepladder semifinals in a one-game playoff; winner advances to the second round
- If no team wins all elimination round games:
  - #1 seed with the twice-to-beat advantage vs #4 seed in the semifinals
  - #2 seed with the twice-to-beat advantage vs #3 seed in the semifinals
- The finals is a best-of-three series.

== Teams ==
All eight universities are participating.

Team	University	Men's coach
Adamson Soaring Falcons	Adamson University (AdU)	(Philippines) Nash Racela
Ateneo Blue Eagles	Ateneo de Manila University (ADMU)	(United States) Tab Baldwin
De La Salle Green Archers	De La Salle University (DLSU)	(Philippines) Derrick Pumaren
FEU Tamaraws	Far Eastern University (FEU)	(Philippines) Olsen Racela
NU Bulldogs	National University (NU)	(Philippines) Jeff Napa
UE Red Warriors	University of the East (UE)	(Philippines) Jack Santiago
UP Fighting Maroons	University of the Philippines Diliman (UP)	(Philippines) Goldwin Monteverde
UST Growling Tigers	University of Santo Tomas (UST)	(Philippines) Jino Manansala

=== Coaching changes ===
Team	Outgoing coach	Manner of departure	Date	Replaced by	Date
NU Bulldogs	(Philippines) Jamike Jarin	Resignation	October 30, 2019	(Philippines) Goldwin Monteverde	May 2020
UE Red Warriors	(Philippines) Bong Tan	Death	November 11, 2019	(Philippines) Jack Santiago	January 20, 2020
De La Salle Green Archers	(Philippines) Gian Nazario	End of interim term	January 1, 2020	(Philippines) Derrick Pumaren	January 1, 2020
NU Bulldogs	(Philippines) Goldwin Monteverde	Resignation	August 17, 2020	(Philippines) Jeff Napa	October 9, 2020
UST Growling Tigers	(Philippines) Aldin Ayo	Resignation	September 5, 2020	(Philippines) Jino Manansala	October 8, 2020
Adamson Soaring Falcons	(Philippines) Franz Pumaren	Resignation	February 16, 2021	(Philippines) Nash Racela	December 1, 2021
UP Fighting Maroons	(Philippines) Bo Perasol	Resignation	July 14, 2021	(Philippines) Goldwin Monteverde	August 13, 2021

== Venue ==
The SM Mall of Asia Arena in Pasay hosted the opening ceremonies and all the games. All games were held behind closed doors in a full bubble setup during the first four playing dates of the first round, meaning no fans were allowed inside the playing venue. However, on April 5, 2022, which was the fifth playing date of the basketball tournament, the UAAP allowed fans in a limited capacity to watch live at the Mall of Asia Arena.

== Squads ==
Due to the ongoing COVID-19 pandemic, teams were permitted to have 20 players in their rosters instead of the previous 16. The four additional players can be tapped only for COVID-related reasons.

=== Imports ===
Each UAAP team can have one foreigner player, or an import, termed as "foreign student-athletes (FSA)" by the UAAP in the 16-man lineup, but can have as many in their reserve list.

With Ange Kouame's then impending naturalization, Ateneo coach Tab Baldwin said that they are not planning to get another FSA to replace Koaume's FSA slot on the roster.

Team	Import	Nationality
Adamson Soaring Falcons	Lenda Douanga	Congo
Ateneo Blue Eagles	Ange Kouame	Ivory Coast (Note: Kouame was naturalized as a Filipino citizen on 2021.)
De La Salle Green Archers	Bright Nwankwo	Nigeria
FEU Tamaraws	Emman Ojuola	Nigeria
NU Bulldogs	Issa Gaye	Senegal
UE Red Warriors	none	
UP Fighting Maroons	Malick Diouf	Senegal
UST Growling Tigers	none	

== Elimination round ==
=== Team standings ===
Pos	Team	W	L	PCT	GB	Qualification
1	Ateneo Blue Eagles	13	1	.929	—	Twice-to-beat in the semifinals
2	UP Fighting Maroons	12	2	.857	1	Twice-to-beat in the semifinals
3	De La Salle Green Archers (H)	9	5	.643	4	Twice-to-win in the semifinals
4	FEU Tamaraws	7	7	.500	6	Twice-to-win in the semifinals
5	Adamson Soaring Falcons	6	8	.429 (Note: Head-to-head record: Adamson 1–1 NU (Adamson +5))	7	
6	NU Bulldogs	6	8	.429	7	
7	UST Growling Tigers	3	11	.214	10	
8	UE Red Warriors	0	14	.000	13	

Source: UAAP Season 84 Men's Basketball Final Stats
Rules for classification: 1) winning percentage; 2) if tied for #2 or #4, one-game playoff; 3) head-to-head record; 4) head-to-head point differential; 5) overall point differential
(H) Hosts

=== Match-up results ===
	Round 1							Round 2						
Team ╲ Game	1	2	3	4	5	6	7	8	9	10	11	12	13	14
Adamson	NU school colors	UE school colors	Ateneo school colors	UST school colors	UP school colors	FEU school colors	La Salle school colors	FEU school colors	NU school colors	UP school colors	UST school colors	Ateneo school colors	La Salle school colors	UE school colors
Ateneo	UP school colors	FEU school colors	Adamson school colors	La Salle school colors	NU school colors	UE school colors	UST school colors	La Salle school colors	UE school colors	UST school colors	NU school colors	Adamson school colors	FEU school colors	UP school colors
La Salle	UE school colors	NU school colors	FEU school colors	Ateneo school colors	UST school colors	UP school colors	Adamson school colors	Ateneo school colors	UST school colors	UE school colors	UP school colors	FEU school colors	Adamson school colors	NU school colors
FEU	UST school colors	Ateneo school colors	La Salle school colors	NU school colors	UE school colors	Adamson school colors	UP school colors	Adamson school colors	UP school colors	NU school colors	UE school colors	La Salle school colors	Ateneo school colors	UST school colors
NU	Adamson school colors	La Salle school colors	UP school colors	FEU school colors	Ateneo school colors	UST school colors	UE school colors	UP school colors	Adamson school colors	FEU school colors	Ateneo school colors	UST school colors	UE school colors	La Salle school colors
UE	La Salle school colors	Adamson school colors	UST school colors	UP school colors	FEU school colors	Ateneo school colors	NU school colors	UST school colors	Ateneo school colors	La Salle school colors	FEU school colors	UP school colors	NU school colors	Adamson school colors
UP	Ateneo school colors	UST school colors	NU school colors	UE school colors	Adamson school colors	La Salle school colors	FEU school colors	NU school colors	FEU school colors	Adamson school colors	La Salle school colors	UE school colors	UST school colors	Ateneo school colors
UST	FEU school colors	UP school colors	UE school colors	Adamson school colors	La Salle school colors	NU school colors	Ateneo school colors	UE school colors	La Salle school colors	Ateneo school colors	Adamson school colors	NU school colors	UP school colors	FEU school colors

Source: UAAP Season 84 Men's Basketball Final Stats
= Win; = OT win; = Loss; = OT loss

=== Scores ===
Results on top and to the right of the grey cells are for first-round games; those to the bottom and to the left of it are second-round games.

Teams	AdU	AdMU	DLSU	FEU	NU	UE	UP	UST
Adamson Soaring Falcons		47–78	58–61	65–66	69–71	82–66	71–73	72–79
Ateneo Blue Eagles	91–57		74–57	79–70	74–64	94–72	90–81	91–80
De La Salle Green Archers	64–51	68–75		75–65	59–55	71–66	59–61	75–66
FEU Tamaraws	63–64	53–70	67–62		68–73	88–74	76–83	76–51
NU Bulldogs	55–62	75–89	65–76	57–59		77–61	70–80	81–52
UE Red Warriors	53–65	63–76	82–85*	61–91	81–100		66–81	62–74
UP Fighting Maroons	58–66	84–83	72–69	73–70	84–76	81–68		98–82
UST Growling Tigers	69–80	51–101	83–112	65–109	60–73	72–61	67–96	

Source: UAAP Season 84 Men's Basketball Final Stats
Legend: Blue = left column team win; Red = top row team win.
Matches with lighter background shading were decided after overtime.

== Bracket ==
Semifinals (Top 2 twice-to-beat)
1	Ateneo	85
4	FEU	72
2	UP	80	78
3	La Salle	83	74

Finals (Best-of-three playoff)
1	Ateneo	74	69	69
2	UP	81*	66	72*

*Overtime

== Semifinals ==
UP and Ateneo have the twice-to-beat advantage. They only have to win once, while their opponents, twice, to progress.

=== (1) Ateneo vs. (4) FEU ===
This is the first meeting between Ateneo and FEU in the semifinals since 2018 and seventh overall. Ateneo kept its #1 seed from the last three tournaments, while FEU is on its eighth consecutive playoff appearance.

TV5

May 4
6:00 p.m.

Ateneo Blue Eagles	85–72	FEU Tamaraws
Scoring by quarter: 16–16, 33–17, 16–15, 20–24
Pts: BJ Andrade 16; Rebs: Angelo Kouame 18; Asts: Angelo Kouame 8		Pts: RJ Abarrientos 16; Rebs: Emmanuel Ojuola 14; Asts: L-Jay Gonzales 4
Ateneo wins series in one game

SM Mall of Asia Arena, Pasay

=== (2) UP vs. (3) La Salle ===
This is the first meeting between UP and La Salle in the semifinals (and playoffs stages) in UAAP men's basketball history. UP is on its third straight playoffs appearance, and its second consecutive tournament with the twice-to-beat advantage. La Salle returned to the semifinals for the first time since 2017 after missing out in the past two tournaments.

One Sports

May 4
2:00 p.m.

UP Fighting Maroons	80–83	De La Salle Green Archers
Scoring by quarter: 16–24, 21–24, 18–18, 25–17
Pts: Diouf, Rivero 18 each Rebs: Malick Diouf 20; Asts: Joel Cagulangan 6		Pts: Evan Nelle 26; Rebs: Justine Baltazar 18; Asts: Evan Nelle 7

SM Mall of Asia Arena, Pasay

TV5

May 6
6:00 p.m.

UP Fighting Maroons	78–74	De La Salle Green Archers
Scoring by quarter: 15–22, 24–22, 12–20, 27–10
Pts: Carl Tamayo 19; Rebs: Malick Diouf 17; Asts: 3 players, 3 each		Pts: Deschon Winston 26; Rebs: Mike Phillips 17; Asts: Justine Baltazar 4
UP wins series in two games

SM Mall of Asia Arena, Pasay

== Finals ==
The finals is a best-of-three series. This is the fifth consecutive finals for Ateneo, and since 2018, the second appearance for UP in the Final Four era, and the second Battle of Katipunan finals, named after Katipunan Avenue that runs between the two campuses.

TV5

May 8
4:00 p.m.

Ateneo Blue Eagles	74–81 (OT)	UP Fighting Maroons
Scoring by quarter: 19–17, 12–15, 23–17, 16–21, Overtime: 4–11
Pts: Angelo Kouame 18; Rebs: Angelo Kouame 11; Asts: Ildefenso, Kouame 4 each		Pts: Ricci Rivero 19; Rebs: Malick Diouf 15; Asts: Malick Diouf 4

SM Mall of Asia Arena, Pasay
Attendance: 11,582

TV5

May 11
6:00 p.m.

Ateneo Blue Eagles	69–66	UP Fighting Maroons
Scoring by quarter: 17–16, 20–12, 12–17, 20–21
Pts: Kouame, Tio 14 each Rebs: Angelo Kouame 14; Asts: Dave Ildefonso 4		Pts: Carl Tamayo 18; Rebs: Malick Diouf 13; Asts: Joel Cagulangan 5

SM Mall of Asia Arena, Pasay
Attendance: 13,521

TV5

May 13
6:00 p.m.

Ateneo Blue Eagles	69–72 (OT)	UP Fighting Maroons
Scoring by quarter: 11–17, 16–14, 20–15, 12–13, Overtime: 10–13
Pts: SJ Belangel 27; Rebs: Angelo Kouame 14; Asts: Belangel, Kouame 4 each		Pts: Malick Diouf 17; Rebs: Malick Diouf 9 Asts: Carl Tamayo 5
UP wins series 2–1

SM Mall of Asia Arena, Pasay
Attendance: 15,132

- Finals Most Valuable Player: Malick Diouf (UP Fighting Maroons)

== Awards ==
UAAP Season 84 men's basketball champions
UP Fighting Maroons
Third title

- Most Valuable Player: Ange Kouame (Ateneo Blue Eagles)
- Rookie of the Year: Carl Tamayo (UP Fighting Maroons)
- Mythical Team:
  - Ange Kouame (Ateneo Blue Eagles)
  - Justine Baltazar (De La Salle Green Archers)
  - Mike Phillips (De La Salle Green Archers)
  - Zavier Lucero (UP Fighting Maroons)
  - Carl Tamayo (UP Fighting Maroons)
- PSBankable Player of the Season: Zavier Lucero (UP Fighting Maroons)

== Statistical leaders ==
=== Season player highs ===
These were for games played during the elimination round.

Statistic	Player	Team	Average
Points	(Philippines) Jerom Lastimosa	Adamson Soaring Falcons	14.71
Rebounds	(Nigeria) Emman Ojuola	FEU Tamaraws	11.5
Assists	(Philippines) JD Cagulangan	UP Fighting Maroons	5.29
Steals	(Philippines) Clint Escamis	UE Red Warriors	2.14
Blocks	(Philippines) Ange Kouame	Ateneo Blue Eagles	2.07

== See also ==
- NCAA Season 97 basketball tournaments

Preceded by Season 82 (2019)	UAAP basketball seasons Season 84 (2021)	Succeeded by Season 85 (2022)
