= UAAP Season 85 basketball tournaments =

Basketball season

UAAP Season 85
- "Rise as One"
- Host school: Adamson University
Men's Finals	G1	G2	G3	Wins
Ateneo Blue Eagles	66	65	75	2
UP Fighting Maroons	72	55	68	1
- Duration: December 11–19, 2022
- Arena(s): SM Mall of Asia Arena (Game 1); Araneta Coliseum (Games 2 & 3)
- Finals MVP: Ange Kouame
- Winning coach: Tab Baldwin (4th title)
- Semifinalists: NU Bulldogs; Adamson Soaring Falcons
- TV network(s): One Sports, UAAP Varsity Channel
Women's Finals	G1	G2	Wins
NU Lady Bulldogs	93	76	2
De La Salle Lady Archers	61	64	0
- Duration: December 7–11, 2022
- Arena(s): Araneta Coliseum (Game 1); SM Mall of Asia Arena (Game 2)
- Finals MVP: Kristine Cayabyab
- Winning coach: Aris Dimaunahan (1st title)
- Semifinalists: UST Growling Tigresses; Ateneo Blue Eagles
- TV network(s): One Sports, UAAP Varsity Channel
Juniors' Finals	G1	G2	Wins
Adamson Baby Falcons	74	76	0
FEU–D Baby Tamaraws	85	77	2
- Duration: March 14–17, 2023
- Arena(s): Filoil EcoOil Centre
- Finals MVP: Kirby Mongcopa
- Winning coach: Allan Albano (3rd title)
- Semifinalists: NUNS Bullpups; UST Tiger Cubs
- TV network(s): One Sports, UAAP Varsity Channel

The UAAP Season 85 basketball tournaments are the University Athletic Association of the Philippines (UAAP) basketball tournaments for the 2022–23 school year.

The collegiate men's and women's tournaments began on October 1, 2022. The Ateneo Blue Eagles reclaimed the men's title from their Finals opponents UP Fighting Maroons. The NU Lady Bulldogs 108-game winning streak was snapped in the elimination round by the De La Salle Lady Archers, but NU still won in the Finals against La Salle to win their 7th consecutive title.

The high school boys' tournament began on January 15, 2023, for the first time since the COVID-19 pandemic. The FEU Diliman Baby Tamaraws defeated the Adamson Baby Falcons for their ninth title.

== Tournament format ==
The UAAP continued to use the UAAP Final Four format.

In cases where a team won all elimination round games, the UAAP has removed the twice-to-beat advantage for the second-seeded team in the second round of the stepladder semifinals.

Fr. Aldrin Suan, UAAP president, said that the league reverted to its pre-pandemic Wednesday, Saturday and Sunday schedule.

The league also included a "head coaches' challenge" based on the FIBA challenge system. This gives each team one challenge per game to review questionable calls by the officials.

Dickie Bachmann, former Alaska Aces governor in the Philippine Basketball Association, was appointed as the UAAP basketball commissioner for this season. Bachmann's term as basketball commissioner was supposed to last until the league's 86th season but he foregone the position as he was appointed as the new Philippine Sports Commission chairman. Ronnie Magsanoc was initially named commissioner to replace Bachmann. Xaxy Nunag was eventually named Bachmann's permanent replacement.

== Teams ==
Collegiate division
University	Men		Women		Uniform manufacturer
University	Team	Coach	Team	Coach	Uniform manufacturer
Adamson University (AdU)	Soaring Falcons	(Philippines) Nash Racela	Lady Falcons	(Philippines) Brian Gorospe	Anta
Ateneo de Manila University (ADMU)	Blue Eagles	(United States) Tab Baldwin	Blue Eagles	(Philippines) LA Mumar	Jordan Brand (Nike)
De La Salle University (DLSU)	Green Archers	(Philippines) Derrick Pumaren	Lady Archers	(Philippines) Pocholo Villanueva	Nike
Far Eastern University (FEU)	Tamaraws	(Philippines) Olsen Racela	Lady Tamaraws	(Philippines) Bert Flores	Puma
National University (NU)	Bulldogs	(Philippines) Jeff Napa	Lady Bulldogs	(Philippines) Aries Dimaunahan	
University of the East (UE)	Red Warriors	(Philippines) Jack Santiago	Lady Warriors	(Philippines) Aileen Lebornio	
University of the Philippines Diliman (UP)	Fighting Maroons	(Philippines) Goldwin Monteverde	Fighting Maroons	(Philippines) Paul Ramos	STATS
University of Santo Tomas (UST)	Growling Tigers	(Philippines) Bal David	Tigresses	(Philippines) Haydee Ong	Anta

High School division
High school	Boys' team
Adamson University (AdU)	Baby Falcons
Ateneo de Manila University (AdMU)	Blue Eagles
De La Salle Santiago Zobel School (DLSZ)	Junior Archers
Far Eastern University Diliman (FEU-D)	Baby Tamaraws
Nazareth School of National University (NSNU)	Bullpups
University of the East (UE)	Junior Warriors
University of the Philippines Integrated School (UPIS)	Junior Fighting Maroons
University of Santo Tomas Senior High School (UST)	Tiger Cubs

=== Name changes ===
- Ateneo Lady Eagles and Ateneo Blue Eaglets: On May 5, 2022, Ateneo announced that all of its UAAP teams, regardless of gender, sport or division will now be called the "Blue Eagles".

=== Coaching changes ===
Team	Outgoing coach	Manner of departure	Date	Replaced by	Date
Ateneo Blue Eagles (women)	Katrina Quimpo	End of contract	March 23, 2020	LA Mumar	March 23, 2020
NU Lady Bulldogs	Patrick Aquino	Signed with Philippines women national team	May 22, 2022	Aries Dimaunahan	May 22, 2022
UST Growling Tigers	Jinino Manansala	Signed with UST Tiger Cubs	July 5, 2022	Bal David	July 23, 2022

== Venues ==
Basketball venues

The UAAP released its schedule on September 28. Opening weekend was at SM Mall of Asia Arena in Pasay, with games at PhilSports Arena in Pasig, Araneta Coliseum in Quezon City, and at the Ynares Center in Antipolo, Rizal.

For Wednesday quadrupleheaders, the women's tournament will play at the Quadricentennial Pavilion in UST's Manila campus; on all other game days, the women's teams will play on the same venue and day as their corresponding men's team.

For the boys' tournament, the Filoil EcoOil Centre in San Juan was scheduled to host all but one gamedays, with the San Andres Sports Complex in Manila hosting one gameday. Eventually, Paco Arena, also in Manila, hosted several elimination round gamedays.

Arena		Location	Tournament			Capacity
Arena		Location	M	W	B	Capacity
3	Araneta Coliseum	Quezon City	check	check		14,429
6	Filoil EcoOil Centre	San Juan			check	6,000
8	Paco Arena	Manila			check	1,000
2	PhilSports Arena	Pasig	check	check		10,000
1	Quadricentennial Pavilion	Manila		check		5,792
7	San Andres Sports Complex	Manila			check	1,000
5	SM Mall of Asia Arena	Pasay	check	check		15,000
4	Ynares Center	Antipolo, Rizal	check	check		7,400

== Squads ==
Each team has a 20-player roster, of which four are reserves. Only one foreigner, an import, or foreign student-athlete (FSA) as called by the UAAP. can be on the active roster.

=== Imports ===
Men's FSAs
Team	Student-Athlete	Nationality
Adamson Soaring Falcons	Lenda Douanga	Congo
Ateneo Blue Eagles	none (Note: Ange Kouame, an Ivorian by birth, was naturalized as a Filipino citizen in 2021 and is no longer classified as an FSA by the UAAP.)	
De La Salle Green Archers	Bright Nwankwo	Nigeria
FEU Tamaraws	Patrick Tchuente	Cameroon
NU Bulldogs	Omar John	Senegal
UE Red Warriors	none	
UP Fighting Maroons	Malick Diouf	Senegal
UST Growling Tigers	Adama Faye	Senegal

== Men's tournament ==
=== Elimination round ===
==== Team standings ====
Pos	Team	W	L	PCT	GB	Qualification
1	Ateneo Blue Eagles	11	3	.786 (Note: Head to head record: Ateneo 1–1 UP (Ateneo +3))	—	Twice-to-beat in the semifinals
2	UP Fighting Maroons	11	3	.786	—	Twice-to-beat in the semifinals
3	NU Bulldogs	9	5	.643	2	Twice-to-win in the semifinals
4	Adamson Soaring Falcons (H)	7	7	.500 (Note: Fourth seed playoff: Adamson 80–76 La Salle)	4	Twice-to-win in the semifinals
5	De La Salle Green Archers	7	7	.500	4	
6	UE Red Warriors	5	9	.357 (Note: Head to head record: UE 1–1 FEU (UE +3))	6	
7	FEU Tamaraws	5	9	.357	6	
8	UST Growling Tigers	1	13	.071	10	

Source: UAAP on Livestats
Rules for classification: 1) winning percentage; 2) if tied for No. 2 or 4, one-game playoff; 3) head-to-head record; 4) head-to-head point differential; 5) overall point differential
(H) Hosts

==== Match-up results ====
	Round 1							Round 2						
Team ╲ Game	1	2	3	4	5	6	7	8	9	10	11	12	13	14
Adamson	UST school colors	UP school colors	UE school colors	FEU school colors	NU school colors	Ateneo school colors	La Salle school colors	UP school colors	UST school colors	La Salle school colors	UE school colors	FEU school colors	NU school colors	Ateneo school colors
Ateneo	FEU school colors	NU school colors	La Salle school colors	UST school colors	UP school colors	UE school colors	Adamson school colors	NU school colors	La Salle school colors	UST school colors	FEU school colors	UE school colors	UP school colors	Adamson school colors
La Salle	UP school colors	UST school colors	Ateneo school colors	UE school colors	FEU school colors	NU school colors	Adamson school colors	FEU school colors	Ateneo school colors	Adamson school colors	UP school colors	NU school colors	UE school colors	UST school colors
FEU	Ateneo school colors	UE school colors	UP school colors	Adamson school colors	La Salle school colors	UST school colors	NU school colors	UE school colors	La Salle school colors	NU school colors	UP school colors	Ateneo school colors	Adamson school colors	UST school colors
NU	UE school colors	Ateneo school colors	UST school colors	UP school colors	Adamson school colors	La Salle school colors	FEU school colors	UP school colors	Ateneo school colors	FEU school colors	UE school colors	UST school colors	La Salle school colors	Adamson school colors
UE	NU school colors	FEU school colors	Adamson school colors	La Salle school colors	UST school colors	UP school colors	Ateneo school colors	FEU school colors	UST school colors	UP school colors	NU school colors	Adamson school colors	Ateneo school colors	La Salle school colors
UP	La Salle school colors	Adamson school colors	FEU school colors	NU school colors	Ateneo school colors	UE school colors	UST school colors	NU school colors	Adamson school colors	UE school colors	FEU school colors	La Salle school colors	UST school colors	Ateneo school colors
UST	Adamson school colors	La Salle school colors	NU school colors	Ateneo school colors	UE school colors	FEU school colors	UP school colors	UE school colors	Adamson school colors	Ateneo school colors	NU school colors	UP school colors	FEU school colors	La Salle school colors

Source: UAAP on Livestats
= Win; = OT win; = Loss; = OT loss

==== Scores ====
Results on top and to the right of the grey cells are for first-round games; those to the bottom and to the left of it are second-round games.

Teams	AdU	ADMU	DLSU	FEU	NU	UE	UP	UST
Adamson Soaring Falcons		55–76	86–84*	76–65	54–58	74–61	78–87*	60–69
Ateneo Blue Eagles	66–61		78–83	79–70	77–60	91–76	71–76*	79–52
De La Salle Green Archers	81–78	54–68		87–70	76–80	74–81	69–72	83–63
FEU Tamaraws	70–75	65–71	57–53		47–44	66–76	67–73	75–60
NU Bulldogs	63–64	78–74	58–63	71–60		77–70	80–75	69–63
UE Red Warriors	64–74	66–69*	80–72*	68–75	61–70		77–84	78–68
UP Fighting Maroons	91–70	67–75	80–82	73–59	75–63	83–69		76–51
UST Growling Tigers	55–56	55–72	72–77	62–77	57–67	51–81	60–78	

Source: UAAP on Livestats
Legend: Blue = left column team win; Red = top row team win.
Matches with lighter background shading were decided after overtime.

Postponed games:

- October 29 men's games (UST vs. La Salle, Ateneo vs. Adamson) were postponed due to Tropical Storm Paeng.

=== Fourth seed playoff ===
La Salle and Adamson finished the elimination round tied for fourth. This was a one-game playoff to determine the No. 4 seed.

One Sports
UAAP Varsity Channel

December 4
6:00 p.m.

Box score

De La Salle Green Archers	76–80	Adamson Soaring Falcons
Scoring by quarter: 27–20, 21–18, 12–21, 16–21
Pts: Evan Nelle 22; Rebs: Raven Cortez 8 Asts: Evan Nelle 7		Pts: Jerom Lastimosa 22; Rebs: Cedrick Manzano 12; Asts: Jerom Lastimosa 6
Adamson advances to the Final Four

SM Mall of Asia Arena, Pasay

=== Bracket ===
Semifinals (Top 2 twice-to-beat)
1	Ateneo	81
4	Adamson	60
2	UP	69
3	NU	61

Finals (Best-of-three playoff)
1	Ateneo	66	65	75
2	UP	72	55	68

=== Semifinals ===
Ateneo and UP had the twice-to-beat advantage which means they have to win only once, and their opponents twice in the semifinals to advance to the Finals.

==== (1) Ateneo vs. (4) Adamson ====
The Ateneo Blue Eagles qualified for their eighth consecutive Final Four appearance, and their sixth consecutive tournament with the twice-to-beat advantage – the longest active streak in the Final Four era of UAAP men's basketball. Adamson returns to the Final Four for the first time since 2018.

One Sports
UAAP Varsity Channel

December 7, 2022
6:00 p.m.
(UTC+8:00)

Box score

Ateneo Blue Eagles	81–60	Adamson Soaring Falcons
Scoring by quarter: 20–13, 19–16, 24–7, 18–24
Pts: Rence Padrigao 16; Rebs: Ange Kouame 10; Asts: Padrigao, Koon 5 each		Pts: Jerom Lastimosa 10; Rebs: Cedrick Manzano 12; Asts: Lastimosa, Colonia 3 each
Ateneo wins series in one game

Araneta Coliseum, Quezon City

==== (2) UP vs. (3) NU ====
This was the first meeting between UP and NU in the semifinals in UAAP men's basketball history. UP was in its fourth straight playoffs appearance, and its third consecutive tournament with the twice-to-beat advantage. The NU Bulldogs returned to the semifinals for the first time since 2015 after missing out the past 5 seasons.

One Sports
UAAP Varsity Channel

December 7, 2022
2:00 p.m.
(UTC+8:00)

Box score

UP Fighting Maroons	69–61	NU Bulldogs
Scoring by quarter: 17–19, 18–19, 19–7, 15–16
Pts: Malick Diouf 17; Rebs: Malick Diouf 21; Asts: JD Cagulangan 6		Pts: John Figueroa 16; Rebs: John Figueroa 14; Asts: Kean Baclaan 5
UP wins series in one game

Araneta Coliseum, Quezon City
Attendance: 8,724

=== Finals ===
The Finals was a best-of-three series.

This was the second consecutive (and third overall) Battle of Katipunan finals. For the first time in the Final Four era of UAAP men's basketball, Ateneo clinched their sixth consecutive finals appearance – the school's longest overall championship appearance streak in UAAP men's basketball. UP clinched their second consecutive finals appearance.

One Sports
UAAP Varsity Channel

December 11, 2022
6:00 p.m.
(UTC+8:00)

Box score

Ateneo Blue Eagles	66–72	UP Fighting Maroons
Scoring by quarter: 19–28, 16–14, 15–12, 16–18
Pts: Rence Padrigao 16; Rebs: Ange Kouame 10; Asts: Vince Gomez 5		Pts: Zavier Lucero 14; Rebs: Zavier Lucero 11; Asts: JD Cagulangan 5

SM Mall of Asia Arena, Pasay
Attendance: 18,211

One Sports
UAAP Varsity Channel

December 14, 2022
6:00 p.m.
(UTC+8:00)

Box score

Ateneo Blue Eagles	65–55	UP Fighting Maroons
Scoring by quarter: 20–19, 21–14, 16–11, 8–11
Pts: Ange Kouame 19; Rebs: Ange Kouame 11; Asts: Vince Gomez 4		Pts: Carl Tamayo 15; Rebs: Lucero, Diouf 11 each Asts: Terrence Fortea 4

Araneta Coliseum, Quezon City
Attendance: 20,616

One Sports
UAAP Varsity Channel

December 19, 2022
6:00 p.m.
(UTC+8:00)

Box score

Ateneo Blue Eagles	75–68	UP Fighting Maroons
Scoring by quarter: 30–14, 17–18, 13–20, 15–16
Pts: Ange Kouame 19; Rebs: Ange Kouame 12; Asts: Padrigao, Koon 3 each		Pts: James Spencer 14; Rebs: Malick Diouf 19; Asts: JD Cagulangan 3
Ateneo wins series, 2–1

Araneta Coliseum, Quezon City
Attendance: 21,814

- Finals Most Valuable Player: Ange Kouame (Ateneo Blue Eagles)

=== Awards ===
UAAP Season 85 men's basketball champions
Ateneo Blue Eagles
12th title

The awards were handed out prior to Game 2 of the Finals at the Araneta Coliseum.

- Most Valuable Player: Malick Diouf (UP Fighting Maroons)
- Rookie of the Year: Kevin Quiambao (De La Salle Green Archers)
- Mythical Five:
  - Malick Diouf (UP Fighting Maroons)
  - Carl Tamayo (UP Fighting Maroons)
  - Rence Padrigao (Ateneo Blue Eagles)
  - Dave Ildefonso (Ateneo Blue Eagles)
  - Luis Villegas (UE Red Warriors)
- Lazada Swag Player of the Season: Carl Tamayo (UP Fighting Maroons)
- PSBankable Player of the Season: Jerom Lastimosa (Adamson Soaring Falcons)

==== Players of the Week ====
The Collegiate Press Corps awards a "player of the week" on Tuesdays for performances on the preceding week.

Week	Player	Team
Week 1	(Philippines) Terrence Fortea	UP Fighting Maroons
Week 2	(Philippines) Luis Villegas	UE Red Warriors
Week 3	(Philippines) John Bryan Sajonia	FEU Tamaraws
Week 4	(Senegal) Malick Diouf	UP Fighting Maroons
Week 5	(Philippines) Kevin Quiambao	De La Salle Green Archers
Week 6	(Philippines) Jerom Lastimosa	Adamson Soaring Falcons
Week 7	(Philippines) Jerom Lastimosa	Adamson Soaring Falcons

=== Player suspensions ===
- Adama Faye of the UST Growling Tigers for an unsportsmanlike foul against Luis Villegas of the UE Red Warriors. He served his one-game suspension in the game of UST versus FEU Tamaraws.
- CJ Austria of the De La Salle Green Archers for an unsportsmanlike foul against Patrick Sleat of the FEU Tamaraws. He served his one-game suspension in the game of La Salle versus NU Bulldogs.
- Evan Nelle of the De La Salle Green Archers for an unsportsmanlike foul against Jerom Lastimosa of the Adamson Soaring Falcons. He served his one-game suspension in the game of La Salle versus FEU Tamaraws.
- Kean Baclaan of the NU Bulldogs for faking a foul against De La Salle Green Archers. He served his one-game suspension in the game of NU versus Adamson Soaring Falcons.

=== Statistical leaders ===
Statistical leaders' averages after the elimination round.

==== Statistical points leaders ====
#	Player	Team	SP
1	(Senegal) Malick Diouf	UP Fighting Maroons	73.857
2	(Philippines) Rence Padrigao	Ateneo Blue Eagles	71.571
3	(Philippines) Ange Kouame	Ateneo Blue Eagles	70.786
4	(Philippines) Luis Villegas	UE Red Warriors	69.857
5	(Philippines) Evan Nelle	De La Salle Green Archers	68.091

==== Player game highs ====
Category	Player	Team	Total	Opponent
Points	(Philippines) Nic Cabanero	UST Growling Tigers	33	Adamson Soaring Falcons
Rebounds	(Senegal) Malick Diouf	UP Fighting Maroons	20	FEU Tamaraws
Rebounds	(Philippines) Michael Phillips	De La Salle Green Archers	20	UP Fighting Maroons
Assists	(Philippines) Evan Nelle	De La Salle Green Archers	12	FEU Tamaraws
Steals	(Philippines) Rence Padrigao	Ateneo Blue Eagles	7 (Note: Game went into overtime.)	UE Red Warriors
Steals	(Philippines) Evan Nelle	De La Salle Green Archers	6 (Note: Game ended in regulation time.)	FEU Tamaraws
Blocks	(Philippines) Raven Cortez	De La Salle Green Archers	6	FEU Tamaraws
Turnovers	(Philippines) Nic Cabanero	UST Growling Tigers	9	Adamson Soaring Falcons

==== Player season highs ====
Category	Player	Team	Average
Points per game	(Philippines) Nic Cabanero	UST Growling Tigers	17.62
Rebounds per game	(Senegal) Adama Faye	UST Growling Tigers	12.23
Assists per game	(Philippines) Evan Nelle	De La Salle Green Archers	5.91
Steals per game	(Philippines) Mark Nonoy	De La Salle Green Archers	2.36
Blocks per game	(Philippines) Ange Kouame	Ateneo Blue Eagles	4.43
Field goal percentage	(Philippines) Jalen Stevens	UE Red Warriors	61.22%
Three point field goal percentage	(Philippines) Terrence Fortea	UP Fighting Maroons	41.27%
Free throw percentage	(Philippines) Evan Nelle	De La Salle Green Archers	95.65%
Turnovers per game	(Senegal) Adama Faye	UST Growling Tigers	3.85

==== Team game highs ====
Category	Team	Total	Opponent
Points	UP Fighting Maroons	91	Adamson Soaring Falcons
Rebounds	Ateneo Blue Eagles	63	De La Salle Green Archers
Assists	De La Salle Green Archers	29	FEU Tamaraws
Steals	De La Salle Green Archers	19	UP Fighting Maroons
Blocks	De La Salle Green Archers	8	FEU Tamaraws
Field goal percentage	UP Fighting Maroons	55.0%	UE Red Warriors
Three point field goal percentage	UP Fighting Maroons	45.0%	Adamson Soaring Falcons
Free throw percentage	Ateneo Blue Eagles	100%	UST Growling Tigers
Free throw percentage	UE Red Warriors	100%	De La Salle Green Archers
Turnovers	UST Growling Tigers	29	UP Fighting Maroons

==== Team season highs ====
Category	Team	Average
Points per game	UP Fighting Maroons	77.86
Rebounds per game	Ateneo Blue Eagles	49.36
Assists per game	De La Salle Green Archers	20.21
Steals per game	De La Salle Green Archers	11.14
Blocks per game	De La Salle Green Archers	4.43
Field goal percentage	UP Fighting Maroons	40.51%
Three point field goal percentage	UP Fighting Maroons	30.93%
Free throw percentage	UP Fighting Maroons	69.93%
Turnovers per game	FEU Tamaraws	13.29

== Women's tournament ==
=== Elimination round ===
The NU Lady Bulldogs' 108-game winning streak – the longest by any sporting team in UAAP history – was snapped by the De La Salle Lady Archers on November 24, when the Lady Archers won in overtime, 61–57. NU's last defeat was in the 2013 Finals also against La Salle.

==== Team standings ====
Pos	Team	W	L	PCT	GB	Qualification
1	NU Lady Bulldogs	13	1	.929	—	Twice-to-beat in the semifinals
2	De La Salle Lady Archers	12	2	.857	1	Twice-to-beat in the semifinals
3	UST Growling Tigresses	11	3	.786	2	Twice-to-win in the semifinals
4	Ateneo Blue Eagles	7	7	.500	6	Twice-to-win in the semifinals
5	UP Fighting Maroons	6	8	.429	7	
6	Adamson Lady Falcons (H)	5	9	.357	8	
7	FEU Lady Tamaraws	2	12	.143	11	
8	UE Lady Warriors	0	14	.000	13	

Source: UAAP on Livestats
Rules for classification: 1) winning percentage; 2) if tied for No. 2 or 4, one-game playoff; 3) head-to-head record; 4) head-to-head point differential; 5) overall point differential
(H) Hosts

==== Match-up results ====
	Round 1							Round 2						
Team ╲ Game	1	2	3	4	5	6	7	8	9	10	11	12	13	14
Adamson	UST school colors	UP school colors	UE school colors	FEU school colors	NU school colors	Ateneo school colors	La Salle school colors	Ateneo school colors	UP school colors	UST school colors	La Salle school colors	UE school colors	FEU school colors	NU school colors
Ateneo	FEU school colors	NU school colors	La Salle school colors	UST school colors	UP school colors	Adamson school colors	UE school colors	Adamson school colors	NU school colors	La Salle school colors	UST school colors	FEU school colors	UE school colors	UP school colors
La Salle	UP school colors	UST school colors	Ateneo school colors	UE school colors	FEU school colors	NU school colors	Adamson school colors	UST school colors	FEU school colors	Ateneo school colors	Adamson school colors	UP school colors	NU school colors	UE school colors
FEU	Ateneo school colors	UE school colors	UP school colors	Adamson school colors	La Salle school colors	UST school colors	NU school colors	UE school colors	La Salle school colors	NU school colors	UP school colors	Ateneo school colors	Adamson school colors	UST school colors
NU	UE school colors	Ateneo school colors	UST school colors	UP school colors	Adamson school colors	La Salle school colors	FEU school colors	UP school colors	Ateneo school colors	FEU school colors	UE school colors	UST school colors	La Salle school colors	Adamson school colors
UE	NU school colors	FEU school colors	Adamson school colors	La Salle school colors	UST school colors	UP school colors	Ateneo school colors	FEU school colors	UST school colors	UP school colors	NU school colors	Adamson school colors	Ateneo school colors	La Salle school colors
UP	La Salle school colors	Adamson school colors	FEU school colors	NU school colors	Ateneo school colors	UE school colors	UST school colors	NU school colors	Adamson school colors	UE school colors	FEU school colors	La Salle school colors	UST school colors	Ateneo school colors
UST	Adamson school colors	La Salle school colors	NU school colors	Ateneo school colors	UE school colors	FEU school colors	UP school colors	La Salle school colors	UE school colors	Adamson school colors	Ateneo school colors	NU school colors	UP school colors	FEU school colors

Source: UAAP on Livestats
= Win; = OT win; = Loss; = OT loss

==== Scores ====
Results on top and to the right of the grey cells are for first-round games; those to the bottom and to the left of it are second-round games.

Teams	AdU	ADMU	DLSU	FEU	NU	UE	UP	UST
Adamson Lady Falcons		58–66	65–75	95–61	66–100	97–69	56–64	70–106
Ateneo Blue Eagles	76–72		67–75	67–64	52–89	73–62	67–61	68–69
De La Salle Lady Archers	54–48	56–55		65–58	72–93	76–53	73–51	57–71
FEU Lady Tamaraws	42–62	50–67	42–56		44–67	62–50	56–73	49–83
NU Lady Bulldogs	101–55	74–60	57–61*	80–53		131–47	79–44	78–75
UE Lady Warriors	59–82	51–65	41–66	56–62	31–92		42–66	44–107
UP Fighting Maroons	61–62	84–57	67–86	73–56	68–95	67–32		61–82
UST Tigresses	73–66	63–53	60–67	77–65	64–87	76–36	85–52	

Source: UAAP on Livestats
Legend: Blue = left column team win; Red = top row team win.
Matches with lighter background shading were decided after overtime.

=== Bracket ===
Semifinals (Top 2 twice-to-beat)
1	NU	83
4	Ateneo	64
2	La Salle	57	74
3	UST	68	69

Finals (Best-of-three playoff)
1	NU	93	76
2	La Salle	61	64

=== Semifinals ===
NU and La Salle have the twice-to-beat advantage, which means they have to win only once, and their opponents twice in the semifinals to advance to the Finals.

==== (1) NU vs. (4) Ateneo ====
The NU Lady Bulldogs have qualified for the Final Four anew. Their second round loss to La Salle meant that the Final Four will be played in the usual format for first time since 2013. The Ateneo Blue Eagles booked the last ticket to the Final Four. This was their first playoff appearance since 2015.

One Sports
UAAP Varsity Channel

November 30, 2022
9:00 a.m.
(UTC+8:00)

Box score

NU Lady Bulldogs	83–64	Ateneo Blue Eagles
Scoring by quarter: 27–20, 25–19, 10–11, 21–14
Pts: Camille Clarin 19; Rebs: Karl Pingol 9 Asts: Gypsy Canuto 10		Pts: Kacey Dela Rosa 22; Rebs: Kacey Dela Rosa 18; Asts: Sandra Villacruz 5
NU wins series in one game

Araneta Coliseum, Quezon City

==== (2) La Salle vs. (3) UST ====
The De La Salle Lady Archers and UST Tigresses have qualified for the Final Four.

One Sports
UAAP Varsity Channel

November 30, 2022
11:00 a.m.
(UTC+8:00)

Box score

De La Salle Lady Archers	57–68	UST Growling Tigresses
Scoring by quarter: 12–14, 11–24, 14–15, 20–15
Pts: Charmaine Torres 16; Rebs: Fina Tchuido 13; Asts: Marga Jimenez 3		Pts: Eka Soriano 23; Rebs: Eka Soriano, Rocel Dionisio 11; Asts: Eka Soriano 5

Araneta Coliseum, Quezon City

One Sports
UAAP Varsity Channel

December 4, 2022
3:00 p.m.
(UTC+8:00)

Box score

De La Salle Lady Archers	74–69	UST Growling Tigresses
Scoring by quarter: 21–18, 17–16, 19–16, 17–19
Pts: Fina Tchuido 18; Rebs: Fina Tchuido 12; Asts: 4 players, 4 each		Pts: Agatha Bron 13; Rebs: Eka Soriano 9 Asts: Eka Soriano 6
La Salle wins series in two games

SM Mall of Asia Arena, Pasay

=== Finals ===
The Finals was a best-of-three series. NU qualified for its eighth consecutive Finals. La Salle, meanwhile, enters the Finals for the first time since UAAP Season 79.

One Sports
UAAP Varsity Channel

December 7, 2022
11:00 a.m.
(UTC+8:00)

Box score

NU Lady Bulldogs	93–61	De La Salle Lady Archers
Scoring by quarter: 24–15, 22–17, 23–15, 24–14
Pts: Mikka Cacho 16; Rebs: Surada, Tiky 7 each Asts: Gypsy Canuto 8		Pts: Fina Tchuido 18; Rebs: Fina Tchuido 15; Asts: Bettina Binaohan 6

Araneta Coliseum, Quezon City

One Sports
UAAP Varsity Channel

December 11, 2022
2:00 p.m.
(UTC+8:00)

Box score

NU Lady Bulldogs	76–64	De La Salle Lady Archers
Scoring by quarter: 27–11, 15–16, 19–13, 15–24
Pts: Kristine Cayabyab 18; Rebs: Angel Surada 9 Asts: Gypsy Canuto 7		Pts: Charmine Torres 29; Rebs: Fina Tchuido 22; Asts: Marga Jimenez 5
NU wins series 2–0

SM Mall of Asia Arena, Pasay

- Finals Most Valuable Player: Kristine Cayabyab (NU Lady Bulldogs)

=== Awards ===
UAAP Season 85 women's basketball champions
NU Lady Bulldogs
Seventh title, seventh consecutive title

The awards were handed out prior to Game 2 of the Finals at the SM Mall of Asia Arena.

- Most Valuable Player: Eka Soriano (UST Growling Tigresses)
- Rookie of the Year: Kacey Dela Rosa (Ateneo Blue Eagles)
- Mythical Five:
  - Eka Soriano (UST Growling Tigresses)
  - Kacey Dela Rosa (Ateneo Blue Eagles)
  - Jhazmin Joson (Ateneo Blue Eagles)
  - Tacky Tacatac (UST Growling Tigresses)
  - Victoria Adeshina (Adamson Lady Falcons)

==== Players of the Week ====
The Collegiate Press Corps awards a "player of the week" on Tuesdays for performances on the preceding week.

Week	Player	Team
Week 2	(Philippines) Kacey Dela Rosa	Ateneo Blue Eagles
Week 6	(Philippines) Bettina Binaohan	De La Salle Lady Archers

=== Player suspensions ===
- Fina Niantcho Tchuido of the De La Salle Lady Archers for an unsportsmanlike foul against Kristine Cayabyab of NU Lady Bulldogs. She served her one-game suspension in the game of La Salle versus UE Lady Red Warriors.
- Sarah Makanjuola of the Ateneo Blue Eagles for an unsportsmanlike foul against Kamba Kone of UE Lady Red Warriors. She served her one-game suspension in the game of Ateneo versus UP Fighting Maroons.

=== Statistical leaders ===
Statistical leaders' averages after the elimination round.

==== Statistical points leaders ====
#	Player	Team	SP
1	(Philippines) Eka Soriano	UST Growling Tigresses	92.286
2	(Philippines) Kacey Dela Rosa	Ateneo Blue Eagles	77.0
3	(Philippines) Jasmin Joson	Ateneo Blue Eagles	74.714
4	(Philippines) Tacky Tacatac	UST Growling Tigresses	73.429
5	(Nigeria) Victoria Adeshina	Adamson Lady Falcons	72.214

==== Player game highs ====
Category	Player	Team	Total	Opponent
Points	(Philippines) Kacey Dela Rosa	Ateneo Blue Eagles	30	UP Fighting Maroons
Rebounds	(Philippines) Kacey Dela Rosa	Ateneo Blue Eagles	23	Adamson Lady Falcons
Assists	(Philippines) Eka Soriano	UST Growling Tigresses	11	UP Fighting Maroons
Steals	(Philippines) Rachel Ambos	UST Growling Tigresses	8	UE Lady Warriors
Blocks	(Nigeria) Sarah Makanjuola	Ateneo Blue Eagles	7	UE Lady Warriors
Blocks	(Philippines) Kacey Dela Rosa	Ateneo Blue Eagles	7	UP Fighting Maroons
Turnovers	(Philippines) Joyce Terrinal	UE Lady Warriors	13	UP Fighting Maroons

==== Player season highs ====
Category	Player	Team	Average
Points per game	(Philippines) Dindy Medina	Adamson Lady Falcons	20.83
Rebounds per game	(Philippines) Kacey Dela Rosa	Ateneo Blue Eagles	14.08
Assists per game	(Philippines) Eka Soriano	UST Growling Tigresses	7.14
Steals per game	(Philippines) Eka Soriano	UST Growling Tigresses	3.71
Blocks per game	(Philippines) Kacey Dela Rosa	Ateneo Blue Eagles	3.08
Field goal percentage	(Philippines) Rocel Dionisio	UST Growling Tigresses	60.56%
Three point field goal percentage	(Philippines) Kaye Pesquera	UP Fighting Maroons	36.96%
Free throw percentage	(Philippines) Camille Clarin	NU Lady Bulldogs	81.82%
Turnovers per game	(Philippines) Joyce Terrinal	UE Lady Warriors	6.29

==== Team game highs ====
Category	Team	Total	Opponent
Points	NU Lady Bulldogs	131	UE Lady Warriors
Rebounds	UP Fighting Maroons	72	UE Lady Warriors
Assists	NU Lady Bulldogs	39	UE Lady Warriors
Steals	UST Growling Tigresses	28	UE Lady Warriors
Blocks	Ateneo Blue Eagles	9	Adamson Lady Falcons
Field goal percentage	NU Lady Bulldogs	54.0%	UE Lady Warriors
Three point field goal percentage	UST Growling Tigresses	60.0%	Adamson Lady Falcons
Free throw percentage	UST Growling Tigresses	90.0%	Adamson Lady Falcons
Turnovers	UE Lady Warriors	9	Adamson Lady Falcons

==== Team season highs ====
Category	Team	Average
Points per game	NU Lady Bulldogs	87.36
Rebounds per game	NU Lady Bulldogs	53.46
Assists per game	NU Lady Bulldogs	23.57
Steals per game	NU Lady Bulldogs	15.64
Blocks per game	Ateneo Blue Eagles	5.07
Field goal percentage	NU Lady Bulldogs	42.58%
Three point field goal percentage	UST Growling Tigresses	29.27%
Free throw percentage	Ateneo Blue Eagles	55.40%
Turnovers per game	NU Lady Bulldogs	18.29

== Boys' tournament ==
The juniors' tournament will also be a qualifying tournament for the 2023 National Basketball Training Center (NBTC) championship, with the champions qualifying. However, with the UAAP championship series being held in the same week as the NBTC championship, the NBTC decided to give the berths given to the UAAP to its losing semifinalists.

De La Salle University is the sub-host for this tournament.

=== Elimination round ===
==== Team standings ====
Pos	Team	W	L	PCT	GB	Qualification
1	Adamson Baby Falcons	12	2	.857 (Note: Head to head record: Adamson 2–0 FEU Diliman)	—	Twice-to-beat in the semifinals
2	FEU–D Baby Tamaraws	12	2	.857	—	Twice-to-beat in the semifinals
3	NUNS Bullpups	11	3	.786	1	Twice-to-win in the semifinals
4	UST Tiger Cubs	7	7	.500	5	Twice-to-win in the semifinals
5	Ateneo Blue Eagles	5	9	.357	7	
6	Zobel Junior Archers (H)	5	9	.357	7	
7	UE Junior Red Warriors	3	11	.214	9	
8	UPIS Junior Fighting Maroons	1	13	.071	11	

Source: UAAP on Livestats
Rules for classification: 1) winning percentage; 2) if tied for No. 2 or 4, one-game playoff; 3) head-to-head record; 4) head-to-head point differential; 5) overall point differential
(H) Hosts

==== Match-up results ====
	Round 1							Round 2						
Team ╲ Game	1	2	3	4	5	6	7	8	9	10	11	12	13	14
Adamson	NU school colors	La Salle school colors	FEU school colors	UP school colors	UST school colors	UE school colors	Ateneo school colors	FEU school colors	UP school colors	NU school colors	UE school colors	La Salle school colors	Ateneo school colors	UST school colors
Ateneo	FEU school colors	UP school colors	NU school colors	UST school colors	UE school colors	La Salle school colors	Adamson school colors	UE school colors	NU school colors	UP school colors	FEU school colors	UST school colors	Adamson school colors	La Salle school colors
DLSZ	UST school colors	Adamson school colors	UE school colors	FEU school colors	NU school colors	Ateneo school colors	UP school colors	UP school colors	FEU school colors	UE school colors	UST school colors	Adamson school colors	NU school colors	Ateneo school colors
FEU–D	Ateneo school colors	UE school colors	Adamson school colors	La Salle school colors	UP school colors	UST school colors	NU school colors	Adamson school colors	La Salle school colors	UST school colors	Ateneo school colors	UP school colors	UE school colors	NU school colors
NSNU	Adamson school colors	UST school colors	Ateneo school colors	UE school colors	La Salle school colors	UP school colors	FEU school colors	UST school colors	Ateneo school colors	Adamson school colors	UP school colors	UE school colors	La Salle school colors	FEU school colors
UE	UP school colors	FEU school colors	La Salle school colors	NU school colors	Ateneo school colors	Adamson school colors	UST school colors	Ateneo school colors	UST school colors	La Salle school colors	Adamson school colors	NU school colors	FEU school colors	UP school colors
UPIS	UE school colors	Ateneo school colors	UST school colors	Adamson school colors	FEU school colors	NU school colors	La Salle school colors	La Salle school colors	Adamson school colors	Ateneo school colors	NU school colors	FEU school colors	UST school colors	UE school colors
UST	La Salle school colors	NU school colors	UP school colors	Ateneo school colors	Adamson school colors	FEU school colors	UE school colors	NU school colors	UE school colors	FEU school colors	La Salle school colors	Ateneo school colors	UP school colors	Adamson school colors

Source: UAAP on Livestats
= Win; = OT win; = Loss; = OT loss

==== Scores ====
Results on top and to the right of the grey cells are for first-round games; those to the bottom and to the left of it are second-round games.

Teams	AdU	ADMU	DLSZ	FEU-D	NSNU	UE	UPIS	UST
Adamson Baby Falcons		77–50	78–60	73–71	76–79	87–52	83–67	91–64
Ateneo Blue Eagles	88–85		65–70	50–85	63–79	79–84	109–64	71–66
DLSZ Junior Archers	52–66	71–59		58–80	71–74	72–58	76–61	46–56
FEU-D Baby Tamaraws	80–82	90–77	86–56		87–83	116–80	97–59	79–69
NSNU Bullpups	64–72	86–78	67–60	66–82		88–60	78–62	84–58
UE Junior Warriors	60–83	77–88	82–77	87–96	82–90		94–101*	82–85
UPIS Junior Fighting Maroons	70–81	82–88	67–81	67–81	71–83	56–71		64–90
UST Tiger Cubs	66–78	94–78	81–80	75–98	64–71	68–54	75–63	

Source: UAAP on Livestats
Legend: Blue = left column team win; Red = top row team win.
Matches with lighter background shading were decided after overtime.

=== Bracket ===
Semifinals (Top 2 twice-to-beat)
1	Adamson	62
4	UST	55
2	FEU–D	82	71
3	NSNU	93	65

Finals (Best-of-three playoff)
1	Adamson	74	76
2	FEU–D	85	77

=== Semifinals ===
Adamson and FEU have the twice-to-beat advantage in the semifinals, They only need to win once while their opponents twice in order to qualify in the Finals.

==== (1) Adamson vs. (4) UST ====
Adamson qualified for the Final Four after winning in its tenth game. UST clinched its semifinal berth by winning in its penultimate game. The Baby Falcons clinched the twice-to-beat advantage by winning its elimination round finale against the Tiger Cubs.

One Sports
UAAP Varsity Channel

March 7, 2023
2:00 p.m.
(UTC+8:00)

Box score

Adamson Baby Falcons	62–55	UST Tiger Cubs
Scoring by quarter: 18–11, 12–22, 16–9, 16–13
Pts: Vince Reyes 21; Rebs: Carlo Bonzalida 13; Asts: Justin Garcia 7		Pts: Mark Llemit 19; Rebs: Mark Llemit 9 Asts: Regie Ayon 3
Adamson wins series in one game

Filoil EcoOil Centre, San Juan

==== (2) FEU Diliman vs. (3) NSNU ====
The Baby Tamaraws clinched a Final Four berth when it won its ninth game out of 11.

One Sports
UAAP Varsity Channel

March 7, 2023
4:00 p.m.
(UTC+8:00)

Box score

FEU–D Baby Tamaraws	82–93	NUNS Bullpups
Scoring by quarter: 22–24, 16–20, 27–23, 17–26
Pts: JR Pasaol 32; Rebs: Kirby Mongcopa 9 Asts: Dwyne Miranda 6		Pts: Reinhard Jumamoy 30; Rebs: Reinhard Jumamoy 13; Asts: Reinhard Jumamoy 8

Filoil EcoOil Centre, San Juan

One Sports
UAAP Varsity Channel

March 10, 2023
4:00 p.m.
(UTC+8:00)

Box score

FEU–D Baby Tamaraws	71–65	NUNS Bullpups
Scoring by quarter: 20–11, 18–17, 18–14, 15–23
Pts: Daa, Mongcopa 15 each Rebs: Kirby Mongcopa 16; Asts: Jedric Daa 3		Pts: Reinhard Jumamoy 19; Rebs: Reinhard Jumamoy 11; Asts: Reinhard Jumamoy 2
FEU Diliman wins series in two games

Filoil EcoOil Centre, San Juan

=== Finals ===
The finals was a best-of-three series.

Adamson qualified for its first Finals berth in 20 years. FEU Diliman made it to the Finals for the second consecutive tournament (lost to NSNU in 2019).

One Sports
UAAP Varsity Channel

March 14, 2023
2:00 p.m.
(UTC+8:00)

Box score

Adamson Baby Falcons	74–85	FEU–D Baby Tamaraws
Scoring by quarter: 23–25, 27–14, 9–21, 15–25
Pts: Peter Rosillo 19; Rebs: Carlo Bonzalida 13; Asts: Peter Rosillo 4		Pts: Kirby Mongcopa 20; Rebs: Kirby Mongcopa 20; Asts: Kirby Mongcopa 8

Filoil EcoOil Centre, San Juan

One Sports
UAAP Varsity Channel

March 17, 2023
4:00 p.m.
(UTC+8:00)

Box score

Adamson Baby Falcons	76–77	FEU–D Baby Tamaraws
Scoring by quarter: 24–23, 22–20, 14–18, 16–16
Pts: Justine Garcia 20; Rebs: Carlo Bonzalida 9 Asts: Justine Garcia 3		Pts: JR Pasaol 21; Rebs: Kirby Mongcopa 13; Asts: Kirby Mongcopa 9
FEU Diliman wins series, 2-0

Filoil EcoOil Centre, San Juan

- Finals Most Valuable Player: Kirby Mongcopa (FEU–D Baby Tamaraws)

=== Awards ===
UAAP Season 85 boys' basketball champions
FEU–D Baby Tamaraws
Ninth title

The awards were handed out prior to Game 2 of the Finals at the Filoil EcoOil Centre.

- Most Valuable Player: Reinhard Jumamoy (NUNS Bullpups)
- Rookie of the Year: Daryl Valdeavilla (UPIS Junior Fighting Maroons)
- Mythical Five:
  - John Rey Pasaol (FEU–D Baby Tamaraws)
  - Kobe Demisana (UPIS Junior Fighting Maroons)
  - Kristian Porter (Ateneo Blue Eaglets)
  - Reinhard Jumamoy (NUNS Bullpups)
  - Rhylle Melencio (Zobel Junior Archers)

== Overall championship points ==
Pts.	Ranking
15	Champion
12	2nd
10	3rd
8	4th
6	5th
4	6th
2	7th
1	8th
—	Did not join
WD	Withdrew

=== Collegiate division ===
Rank	Team	Men	Women	Total
1st	NU	10	15	25
2nd	Ateneo	15	8	23
3rd	UP	12	6	18
3rd	La Salle	6	12	18
5th	Adamson	8	4	12
6th	UST	1	10	11
7th	UE	4	1	5
8th	FEU	2	2	4

=== High school division ===
Rank	Team	Total
1st	FEU–D	15
2nd	Adamson	12
3rd	NUNS	10
4th	UST	8
5th	Ateneo	6
6th	DLSZ	4
7th	UE	2
8th	UPIS	1

In case of a tie, the team with the higher position in any tournament is ranked higher. If both are still tied, they are listed by alphabetical order.

How rankings are determined:

- Ranks fifth to eighth determined by elimination round standings.
- Loser of the No. 1 vs No. 4 semifinal match-up is ranked fourth
  - If stepladder: Loser of stepladder semifinals round 1 is ranked fourth
- Loser of the No. 2 vs No. 3 semifinal match-up is ranked third
  - If stepladder: Loser of stepladder semifinals round 2 is ranked third
- Loser of the finals is ranked second
- Champion is ranked first

== See also ==
- NCAA Season 98 basketball tournaments

Preceded by Season 84 (2021)	UAAP men's basketball seasons Season 85 (2022)	Succeeded by Season 86 (2023)
Preceded by Season 82 (2019)	UAAP women's basketball seasons Season 85 (2022)	Succeeded by Season 86 (2023)
Preceded by Season 82 (2019–20)	UAAP boys' basketball seasons Season 85 (2023)	Succeeded by Season 86 (2023–24)
