= Bo Perasol =

Filipino basketball player and coach

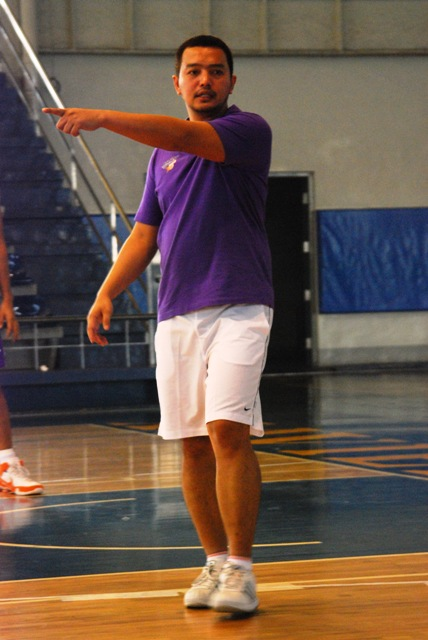
- Perasol in 2008

UP Fighting Maroons
- Position: Basketball Program Director
- League: UAAP

Personal information
- Born: November 30, 1971 (age 54)
- Listed height: 6 ft 3 in (1.91 m)

Career information
- High school: Notre Dame of Dadiangas University (General Santos)
- College: UP

Career history

Coaching
- 2000–2001: Laguna Lakers
- 2003–2004: UPIS
- 2005–2009: Air21 Express
- 2009–2012: Coca-Cola Tigers
- 2013–2016: Ateneo
- 2016–2021: UP

Career highlights
- As executive: 2× UAAP champion (2022, 2024)
Medals
Men's basketball
Head coach for Philippines
William Jones Cup
Gold medal – first place	2016 Taipei	team

Dolreich "Bo" Perasol (born November 30, 1971) is a Filipino basketball coach. He coaches in both collegiate and professional leagues. He is the former head coach of the Ateneo Blue Eagles and the UP Fighting Maroons, and is the current director of the University of the Philippines Office of Athletics and Sports Development.

== Career ==
Bo Perasol was a former player and team captain of the UP Fighting Maroons in the UAAP from the year 1990–1994, one of his notable teammates was Ryan Gregorio, a successful PBA coach. He is among the few athletes of the university who actually passed the UP College Admission Test, a rigorous entrance examination given to high school students in the Philippines. He graduated with a degree in Mass Communications in the year 1994 in the same university. After his stint at the university, he became the coach for the UP Fighting Maroons Juniors, which became his training ground as a coach, before making his coaching debut in the professional leagues such as the Metropolitan Basketball Association and the Philippine Basketball Association (PBA).

=== Air21 Express head coach ===
In the 2005–06 season, Perasol, who previously coached another professional team, MBA's Laguna Lakers, replaced Bong Ramos as head coach of the Air21 Express, previously named as the FedEx Express. Many expected Air21 to drop as low as last place in the season and had a bulky yet untested import Shawn Daniels for the Fiesta Conference.

In the 2005-06 PBA Fiesta Conference, Perasol and the Express became the surprise team of the tournament. Air21 finished fifth in the classification phase but pulled huge upsets over the San Miguel Beermen and the Talk 'N Text Phone Pals in the Wild-Card and Quarterfinal rounds, respectively. The Express lost in six games to the Purefoods Chunkee Giants in the semifinals, but won a one-game match for third-place over the Barangay Ginebra Kings, their best finish in franchise history.

Despite Air21's poor finish in the 2006 PBA Philippine Cup, the Express were able to finish off strong in the classification phase after star player Ren-Ren Ritualo was traded to Talk 'N Text.

Perasol's system follow the same philosophy of the Air21 management, relying on a 12-man rotation and a run-and-gun type of basketball system.

In 2009, he resigned as Air21 head coach despite leading Air21 to runner-up finish.

=== Coca-Cola/Powerade Tigers ===
He was named Kenneth Duremdes' assistant coach and manager of basketball operations for the Coca-Cola Tigers. He took over as head coach in November 2009 when Duremdes filed his candidacy for a local position in Marbel, South Cotabato. When the team rebranded as Powerade, Perasol led the Tigers to the 2012 Philippine Cup Finals (with Gary David as one of the star players) as 8th-seeded knocking down B-Meg Llamados, but lost to the defending champions Talk 'N Text Tropang Texters.

=== Ateneo Blue Eagles head coach ===
In 2013, Perasol took over from Norman Black as the head coach of the Ateneo Blue Eagles. He coached the Blue Eagles for three seasons, leading them to two UAAP Men's Basketball Final Four appearances in 2014 and 2015. He resigned his post in 2016.

=== UP Fighting Maroons head coach ===
Six months after his resignation as the coach of the Ateneo Blue Eagles, Perasol was appointed as the new head coach of the UP Fighting Maroons, replacing Renzy Bajar, who spent only one season as the Maroons' head mentor. The appointment of Perasol was announced on May 2, 2016, days before the start of the campaign in the 2016 Filoil Flying V Preseason Hanes Cup against Perpetual Altas.

In UAAP Season 81, Perasol led the Maroons to their first UAAP Final Four appearance since 1997, defeating the Adamson Falcons in two games, and first UAAP Finals appearance since 1986, losing to the Ateneo Blue Eagles in two games.

Perasol and the UP Fighting Maroons returned again to the Semifinals in UAAP Season 82, this time as the second seed team with the twice-to-beat advantage. This was the first time that UP got the incentive since the Final Four format was introduced in the UAAP. However, they were defeated in two games in the Stepladder Semifinals by the fourth seed UST Growling Tigers, who were the third fourth seed team to enter the UAAP Men's Basketball Finals after the UST Growling Tigers under head coach Pido Jarencio in UAAP Season 76 (2013) and the NU Bulldogs under head coach Eric Altamirano in UAAP Season 77 (2014). Perasol was the head coach of then first-seeded Ateneo Blue Eagles team that lost twice to the eventual champions NU Bulldogs in 2014.

UP announced Perasol's resignation on July 7, 2021. Perasol cite the COVID-19 pandemic as his reason for resigning which he said changed his "views, plans and priorities."

== Controversies ==
Following a heated sports rivalry between the Ateneo Blue Eagles and the De La Salle Green Archers during the UAAP 76, he was given a one-game suspension after a near altercation with a De La Salle fan after the Blue Eagles lost the game. However, he was again penalized and was given a second suspension after violating the league by attending the game against the UE Red Warriors instead of serving his suspension. In the rulebook set by the board of the UAAP, suspended coaches are prohibited at the sports venue while serving suspension.

During UAAP Season 78, a lot of people had bashed him due to the Eagles' losses in the 1st round. Such as the Blue Eagles' blowout 64–88 to the FEU Tamaraws in their opening game. In their game vs the UST Growling Tigers, they were leading by as much as 15, but a 15-point lead was erased by Kevin Ferrer through his 3 three-pointers in the 4th quarter, with the Eagles losing 58–68. What turned even worse was the loss to their archrivals the De La Salle Green Archers as they were leading by as much as 15, but their lead was erased in the 3rd quarter such as 2 three-pointers from Josh Torralba and Thomas Torres. Jason Perkins had also taken the lead for the Archers by his three-pointer in the 3rd quarter. The Eagles lost to the Green Archers 76–80.

During the last game of the UAAP Season 82 first round of eliminations featuring the reigning back-to-back champions Ateneo Blue Eagles and the previous season's finalists, Perasol's UP Fighting Maroons, he was ejected from the game at around the 6:26 mark of the 3rd quarter after he aggressively accosted referee Jaime Rivano and allegedly chest-bumped the said official, even hurling invective language at him. The basketball commissioner for UAAP 82, Jensen Ilagan, ruled that an additional 2-game suspension be imposed on Perasol, on top of the mandatory one-game suspension usually meted out for an offense of this nature. Ilagan said that the suspension should serve as a lesson for the rest of the teams in the league to “exhibit tremendous restraint and discipline not just towards officials but everyone on the court,” however Perasol responded that this was "too much," saying that his presence on the bench would now be even more important, as the tournament enters the second round of eliminations. Perasol said he would appeal the decision. The UAAP later lifted the suspension on Perasol after he reached out and apologized to Ilagan and Rivano.

== Coaching record ==
=== Collegiate record ===
Season	Team	GP	W	L	PCT	Finish	PG	PW	PL	PCT	Results
2013	ADMU	14	7	7	.500	5th	—	—	—	—	Eliminated
2014	ADMU	14	11	3	.786	1st	2	0	2	.000	Semifinals
2015	ADMU	14	9	5	.643	3rd	1	0	1	.000	Semifinals
2016	UP	14	5	9	.358	6th	—	—	—	—	Eliminated
2017	UP	14	6	8	.429	5th	—	—	—	—	Eliminated
2018	UP	14	8	6	.571	3rd	4	2	2	.500	Finals
2019	UP	14	9	5	.643	2nd	2	0	2	.000	Semifinals
Totals		98	55	43	.561		9	2	7	.222	0 championships

Preceded by Bong Ramos	Air21 Express head coach 2005–2009	Succeeded by Yeng Guiao
Preceded by Lito Vergara	UPIS Junior Maroons head coach 2003–2004	Succeeded by Patrick Aquino
Preceded by Kenneth Duremdes	Coca-Cola Tigers head coach 2009–2012	Succeeded by (team disbanded)
Preceded by Norman Black	Ateneo Blue Eagles head coach 2013–2015	Succeeded by Tab Baldwin
Preceded by Renzy Bajar	UP Fighting Maroons head coach 2016–2019	Succeeded by Goldwin Monteverde
