= NU Bulldogs basketball =

Philippine collegiate varsity teams

NU Bulldogs
2026 NU Bulldogs basketball team
- University: National University
- Founded: 1920s
- History: NU Bulldogs (1930s–present)
- Head coach: Jeff Napa (6th season)
- Location: Sampaloc, Manila
- Nickname: Bulldogs
- Colors: Navy Blue and Gold

UAAP Champion (2)
- 1954; 2014

The NU Bulldogs are the collegiate men's basketball team of the National University (NU), which play in the University Athletic Association of the Philippines (UAAP), the premiere sports league in the country.

== History ==
In the early years of the UAAP, the NU Bulldogs were a competitive team in the league, winning a title in 1954. The Bulldogs were coached by Skip Guinto, who was approached by the Jhocsons, owners of NU, to coach their team. The Bulldogs relied on Antonio Villamor to defeat the FEU Tamaraws to win their first title.

The Bulldogs then produced players such as Narciso Bernardo and Jun Papa, but never came close to a repeat Finals appearance, until Reynaldo Sigua was acquired by NU. Sigua led the Bulldogs to a Finals appearance in 1970 against the UE Red Warriors. The Red Warriors prevailed, winning their sixth consecutive UAAP title.

By the 1980s, however, NU was perennially in the bottom ranking of the team standings. In the late 1990s, they improved their ranking by moving up to the middle of the team standings with now PBA stars Danny Ildefonso and Lordy Tugade in their team roster, but still failed to make it to the Final Four.

In the last quarter of year 2008, the family of Henry Sy of SM Prime Holdings acquired majority ownership of the National University. Aside from improving school facilities, the new management has included in their corporate plan the improvement of NU's sports programs. After ten years, the National U Bulldogs made it again to the UAAP Final Four in 2012.

=== UAAP Season 77 ===
At the start of UAAP Season 77, the NU Bulldogs were predicted to lose some ground in the standings due to the losses of key players like former UAAP MVP Ray Parks and foreign student athlete Emmanuel Mbe, but was still expected to compete due to the emergence of players like Troy Rosario, Gelo Alolino and Glenn Khobuntin.

In the 2nd round of the tournament, the Bulldogs fell to the 4th spot in the standings. tied with the UE Red Warriors. They faced UE again in a knockout game for the 4th seed, which they won 51–49. They then defeated the 1st seed Ateneo Blue Eagles twice in the Final Four tournament (as Ateneo had a twice-to-beat advantage, due to their high seed), making them the 2nd number 4 seeded team in UAAP history to defeat a number 1 seeded team, as well as their first trip to the UAAP Finals since 1970.

In the UAAP Season 77 Finals, the Bulldogs faced the FEU Tamaraws in three games, where they finally clinched the championship after winning Game 3, 75–59. This marked the NU Bulldogs' first UAAP Men's basketball championship win in 60 years.

== Roster ==
NU Bulldogs roster
Players
Coaches

Pos.	No.	Nat.	Name	Height	Year	High School
C	1	(Philippines)	Dennis Julen Laconsay	6'4" (1.93m)	1st	MCU
G	2	(Philippines)	Dwyne James Miranda	5'11" (1.8m)	1st	Mapùa
F	4	(Philippines)	Nathaniel Tulabut	6'1" (1.85m)	5th	NUNS
F	5	(Philippines)	Poul Justine Palacielo	6'6" (1.98m)	5th	NUNS
G	7	(Canada)	Paul John Francisco	6'2" (1.88m)	3rd	Ateneo de Cebu
C	8	(Philippines)	Johnkurl Ruiz Figueroa	6'4" (1.93m)	1st	NUNS
G	9	(Philippines)	Chad Ernest Cartel	6'2" (1.88m)	1st	NUNS
G	12	(Philippines)	Reinhard Jumamoy (C)	5'11" (1.8m)	5th	NUNS
C	14	(Philippines)	Sean Jedric Solomon	6'8" (2.03m)	2nd	NUNS
G	19	(Philippines)	Carl Maxi Alfanta	6'0" (1.83m)	1st	NUNS
C	21	(Philippines)	Kurt Edward	6'7" (2.01m)	1st	NUNS
G	24	(Philippines)	Garcia, Justine Kyle	5'11" (1.8m)	3nd	Adamson
G	25	(Philippines)	John Vincent Reyes	6'3" (1.91m)	2nd	Adamson
C	30	(Mali)	Mohamed Diassana	6'9" (2.06m)	2nd	–
F/C	63	(Philippines)	Edson Serrano	6'5" (1.96m)	5th	Benilde
F	77	(Philippines)	Kenshin Padrones	6'5" (1.96m)	5th	NUNS

Head coach

- (Philippines) Jeff Napa

Assistant coach(es)

- (Philippines) Glenn Capacio (Lead Assistant Coach)
- (Philippines) Siot Tanquingcen
- (Philippines) MC Abolucion
- (Philippines) Vic Yacasiano
- (Philippines) Paolo Javelona
- (Philippines) Cedric Labing-isa
- (Philippines) Kevin De Castro
- (Philippines) Denok Miranda
- (Philippines) Danny Ildefonso
- (Philippines) Leo Pujante

Team manager

- (Philippines) Vince So

Legend

- (C) Team captain
- Injured

== Season-by-season records ==
Until 1997, the UAAP primarily ranked the teams by tournament points using FIBA's method. Starting in 1998, the UAAP primarily ranked by winning percentage. There's no difference in ranking once all games were played, but in the middle of the season, rankings made by these two methods may differ.

=== Until 1997 ===
Season	League	Elimination round					Playoffs			
Season	League	Pos	GP	W	L	Pts	GP	W	L	Results
1987	UAAP	8th/8	14	2	12	16	Did not qualify			
1988	UAAP	8th/8	14	2	12	16	Did not qualify			
1989	UAAP	8th/8	14	0	14	14	Did not qualify			
1990	UAAP	8th/8	14	1	13	15	Did not qualify			
1991	UAAP	8th/8	14	1	13	15	Did not qualify			
1992	UAAP	8th/8	14	1	13	15	Did not qualify			
1993	UAAP	8th/8	14	1	13	15	No playoffs held (Note: UST won all elimination round games. Based on the rules at that time, they were then named automatic champions, and other teams were ranked by elimination round finish.)			
1994	UAAP	7th/7	12	0	12	12	Did not qualify			
1995	UAAP	8th/8	14	2	12	16	Did not qualify			
1996	UAAP	7th/8	14	4	10	18	Did not qualify			
1997	UAAP	8th/8	14	3	11	17	Did not qualify			

=== Since 1998 ===
Season	League	Elimination round						Playoffs			
Season	League	Pos	GP	W	L	PCT	GB	GP	W	L	Results
1998	UAAP	7th/8	14	5	9	.357	8	Did not qualify			
1999	UAAP	7th/8	14	3	11	.214	8	Did not qualify			
2000	UAAP	7th/8	14	4	10	.286	8	Did not qualify			
2001	UAAP	4th/8	14	7	7	.500	5	2	1	1	Lost semifinals vs La Salle
2002	UAAP	8th/8	14	2	12	.143	11	Did not qualify			
2003	UAAP	8th/8	14	3	11	.214	8	Did not qualify			
2004	UAAP	8th/8	14	1	13	.071	10	Did not qualify			
2005	UAAP	8th/8	14	1	13	.071	11	Did not qualify			
2006	UAAP	7th/7	12	3	9	.250	7	Did not qualify			
2007	UAAP	6th/8	14	6	8	.429	8	Did not qualify			
2008	UAAP	8th/8	14	2	12	.143	11	Did not qualify			
2009	UAAP	7th/8	14	3	11	.214	10	Did not qualify			
2010	UAAP	5th/8	14	7	7	.500	5	Did not qualify			
2011	UAAP	5th/8	14	6	8	.429	7	Did not qualify			
2012	UAAP	3rd/8	14	9	5	.643	3	1	0	1	Lost semifinals vs UST
2013	UAAP	1st/8	14	10	4	.714	—	2	0	2	Lost semifinals vs UST
2014	UAAP	4th/8	14	9	5	.643	2	6	5	1	Won Finals vs FEU
2015	UAAP	4th/8	14	7	7	.500	4	1	0	1	Lost semifinals vs UST
2016	UAAP	5th/8	14	5	9	.357	8	Did not qualify			
2017	UAAP	6th/8	14	5	9	.357	8	Did not qualify			
2018	UAAP	7th/8	14	4	10	.286	8	Did not qualify			
2019	UAAP	8th/8	14	2	12	.143	12	Did not qualify			
2020 (Note: Season cancelled due to the COVID-19 pandemic.)	UAAP	Season canceled									
2022 (S84)	UAAP	6th/8	14	6	8	.429	7	Did not qualify			
2022 (S85)	UAAP	3rd/8	14	9	5	.643	2	1	0	1	Lost semifinals vs UP
2023	UAAP	3rd/8	14	10	4	.714	2	1	0	1	Lost semifinals vs La Salle
2024	UAAP	7th/8	14	5	9	.357	7	Did not qualify			
2025	UAAP	1st/8	14	11	3	.786	—	2	0	2	Lost semifinals vs La Salle

== Honors ==
=== Team honors ===
- University Athletic Association of the Philippines (UAAP)
  - Champions (2): 1954, 2014
- Father Martin Cup
  - Summer champions (2): 2011, 2013
  - Division 2 champions (1): 2010
  - Open champions (1): 2018–19
- Filoil EcoOil Preseason Cup
  - Champions (3): 2012. 2013, 2022
- U-Belt Collegiate Invitational Cup
  - Champions (1): 2025

=== Player honors ===
- UAAP Most Valuable Player
  - Bobby Ray Parks Jr. (2): 2011, 2012
- UAAP Finals Most Valuable Player
  - Alfred Aroga (1): 2014

== Head coaches ==
- c. 1954: Skip Guinto
- c. 70's-2000: Sonny Paguia
- 2001–02: Manny Dandan
- 2003–04: Rico Perez
- 2005–09: Manny Dandan
- 2010: Eric Gonzales
- 2011–16: Eric Altamirano
- 2017–19: Jamike Jarin
- 2020: Goldwin Monteverde
- 2021–present: Jeff Napa

== Notable players ==
- (Philippines) Gelo Alolino
- (Philippines) (Japan) Matthew Aquino
- (Philippines) Froilan Baguion
- (Philippines) Narciso Bernardo
- (Philippines) Cris Bolado
- (Philippines) Reden Celda
- (Philippines) Robby Celiz
- (Philippines) Danny Ildefonso
- (Philippines) Glenn Khobuntin
- (Philippines) Marion Magat
- (Philippines) Jeff Napa
- (Philippines) Jun Papa
- (Philippines) (United States) Bobby Ray Parks Jr.
- (Philippines) Jewel Ponferada
- (Philippines) (United States) Troy Rike
- (Philippines) Troy Rosario
- (Philippines) Lordy Tugade
- (Philippines) Antonio Villamor
- (Philippines) Dennice Villamor

Legend
C	Center
PG	Point Guard
PF	Power Forward
SG	Shooting Guard
SF	Small Forward

== See also ==
- NU Lady Bulldogs basketball
