= JD Cagulangan =

Filipino basketball player (born 2000)

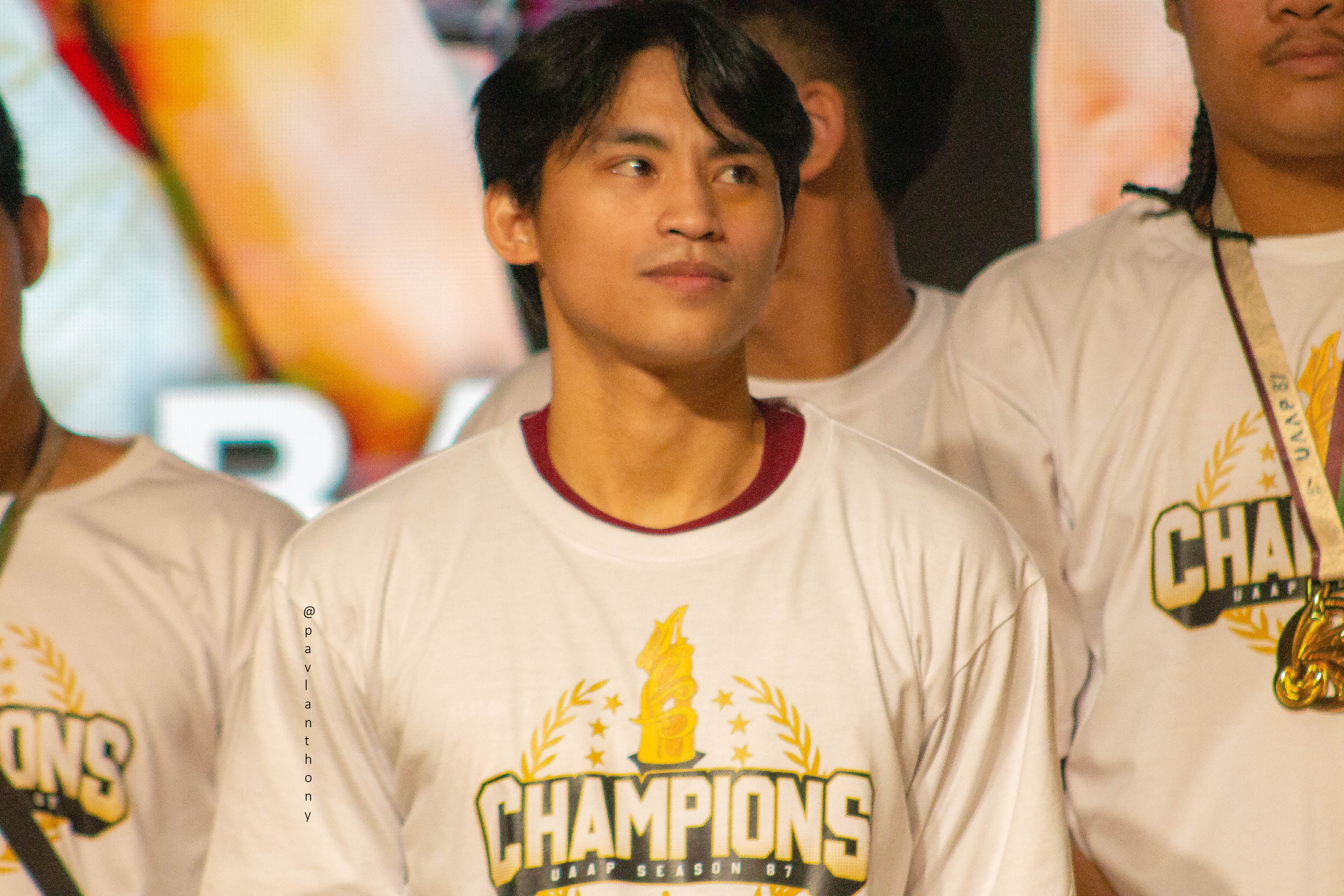
- Cagulangan in 2024

No. 33 – Abra Weavers
- Position: Point guard
- League: MPBL

Personal information
- Born: January 24, 2000 (age 26) Butuan, Philippines
- Listed height: 5 ft 8 in (1.72 m)

Career information
- High school: La Salle Green Hills (Mandaluyong)
- College: De La Salle (2019); UP (2021–2024)
- Playing career: 2024–present

Career history
- 2024–2026: Suwon KT Sonicboom
- 2026–present: Abra Weavers

Career highlights
- KBL Rookie of the Year Award (2025); 2× UAAP champion (2021, 2024); UAAP Finals MVP (2024); UAAP Mythical Team (2024)

Joel Diomar "JD" Cagulangan (born January 24, 2000) is a Filipino basketball player for the Abra Weavers of the Maharlika Pilipinas Basketball League (MPBL).

== Early life and education ==
Cagulangan first played for Northern Mindanao in the 2013 Palarong Pambansa during elementary days before being recruited by La Salle Green Hills (LSGH). In NCAA Season 93 (2017) finals, Cagulangan converted both of his free throws to put LSGH up for good to defeat the Malayan Red Robins and help the Greenies capture their first NCAA title, and the first NCAA juniors' championship for a Lasallian school since 1954. Cagulangan was named Finals MVP for his heroics.

== College career ==
Cagulangan debuted for the De La Salle Green Archers in UAAP Season 82 (2019), but left after the season due to limited playing time and transferred to the University of the Philippines (UP). Prior to completing his move to UP, he enrolled at Saint Clare College of Caloocan during the pandemic, which allowed him to play 4 years for UP without doing residency for a year.

He helped the UP Fighting Maroons claim the UAAP Season 84 (2022) men's basketball championship, their first UAAP title since 1986, with a game-winning three-pointer in Game 3 of their best-of-three championship series against the Ateneo Blue Eagles, breaking the 69-all deadlock with .5 seconds left in overtime.

Cagulangan was named Season 87 (2024) Finals MVP when the Fighting Maroons won the title over his former team, De La Salle Green Archers, on December 15, 2024, at Smart Araneta Coliseum.

== Professional career ==
On December 17, 2024, Cagulangan signed with the Suwon KT Sonicboom of the Korean Basketball League (KBL). During a game against the Wonju DB Promy, he tore his ACL, putting him out for the rest of the 2025–26 season.
