= Photographic assistant =

A photographic assistant, also known as a photo assistant, photographer's assistant, or also second shooter, is "an individual with both photographic and related skills who assists a professional photographer". The work of an assistant photographer is often referred to simply as "assisting". The photo assistant is most often employed on a freelance basis, but in some instances photo assistants are full-time employees; primarily in major markets and with big-name photographers. Second shooters participate in actively documenting an event by covering more angles and capturing more of an event than a single photographer would be able to do.

The latter will often involve assisting a studio or location photographer, not just helping out on shoots, but also carrying out the mundane day-to-day running of the studio. A freelance photo assistant will typically assist a number of different photographers on a shoot-by-shoot basis.

Previously, the main tasks of the photographic assistant would be loading and processing film, setting up lights, taking meter readings, and color temperature readings, shooting lighting test Polaroids; presenting the photographer with a set that is ready for the photographer to begin creative adjustments with the model(s) or product(s). With digital capture having replaced traditional film photography in most commercial settings, the photographer's assistant also needs to be a highly computer literate and a skilled lighting technician; as these skills are no longer being passed on by photographers, who themselves are less technically proficient than their counterparts 20 years ago.

With the onset of digital photography, the task of the assistant increasingly involves digital work, be it downloading compactflash cards or setting up the computer and camera for digital capture.

An important ongoing task of the assistant photographer, whether they work with digital or film, is setting up lighting, taking light meter readings and, generally speaking, doing all of the manual setup on a shoot.
