= Jeff Napa =

Filipino basketball player and coach

NU Bulldogs
- Position: Head coach
- League: UAAP

Personal information
- Born: September 19, 1981 (age 45)

Career information
- High school: PCCr (Manila)
- College: NU (1997/1998–2002)
- Playing career: 2002–2005
- Coaching career: 2005–present

Career history

Playing
- 2002–2003: John-O
- 2003–2004: Viva Mineral Water
- 2004–2005: Fash Liquid Laundry Detergent

Coaching
- 2005–2020: NU (assistant)
- 2011–2016: NSNU
- 2016–2018: Letran
- 2019–2025: NorthPort Batang Pier (assistant)
- 2020: CEU
- 2020–present: NU
- 2025–present: Terrafirma Dyip (assistant)

Career highlights
- As head coach: 3× UAAP Juniors Basketball champion (2011, 2013, 2015); Filoil Flying V Cup champion (2022); AsiaBasket champion (2024 International); AsiaBasket Coach of the Tournament (2024 International); As assistant coach: UAAP Senior's Basketball champion (2014)

Jefferson "Jeff" Napa (born September 19, 1981) is a Filipino professional basketball player and coach. He is the current head coach of the NU Bulldogs in the UAAP and currently serving as an assistant for the Terrafirma Dyip in the PBA. He previously coached the Letran Knights in the NCAA.

== Playing career ==
Jeff Napa was part of the first-ever NU Bulldogs men's basketball team that made it to the Final Four phase of the UAAP basketball tournament in UAAP Season 64. He also tied the record held by Allan Caidic for the most number of three-points made in a single UAAP game. However, the Bulldogs did not advance in the Finals series after their loss against De La Salle Green Archers in the final four series.

After his collegiate basketball career, Napa played for the teams John-O, Viva Mineral Water and Fash Liquid Laundry Detergent in the Philippine Basketball League.

== Coaching career ==
In 2005, Manny Dandan, the then-head coach of NU Bulldogs invited Napa to join the team as an assistant coach and he later accepted it. Napa was later appointed as Head Coach of NU Bullpups junior's basketball team where he successfully steered three championships (Season 74, 76 and 78) with the squad in the last five years.

=== Move to Letran Knights ===
Napa emerged as one of the frontrunners for the coaching job of the Letran Knights, replacing NCAA Season 91 men's basketball champion coach Aldin Ayo who is now the head coach of the De La Salle Green Archers in the UAAP. Right after the championship run of NSNU Bullpups on the UAAP Season 78 juniors basketball tournament, Napa openly admitted in an interview that he is in talks with the Colegio de San Juan de Letran officials about his possibility to take over the coaching duty for Letran Knights. The search committee unanimously voted for Napa after a series of interviews of applicants including Napa, Mapua Cardinals assistant coach Randy Alcantara, Adamson Falcons assistant coach Mike Fermin, and Letran alumnus Elvis Tolentino.

On March 8, 2016, Napa was appointed as the new head coach of Letran Knights men's basketball team in a news conference held at the Salon de Actos in the Letran's main campus in Intramuros, Manila.

He also decided to stay in the NU Bullpups program as a team consultant. Napa's deputy, Chico Manabat, who is also the husband of volleyball player Dindin Santiago-Manabat, took over as head coach of the Bullpups starting Season 79. Manabat, Jay Agleron, and Leo Pujante also joined the coaching staff of the Knights.

Napa will be the second non-Letran alumnus to take the coaching job of the men's basketball team, after Louie Alas, who handled the team that won three championships in NCAA men's basketball.

=== Return to National University ===
Napa will return to National University, this time coaching the seniors team NU Bulldogs starting in 2022.

== Coaching record ==
=== Collegiate record ===
Season	Team	Elimination round					Playoffs				
Season	Team	Finish	GP	W	L	PCT	GP	W	L	PCT	Results
2016	CSJL	6th	18	9	9	.500	—	—	—	—	Eliminated
2017	CSJL	5th	18	9	9	.500	2	1	1	.500	4th seed playoff
2018	CSJL	3rd	18	13	5	.722	1	0	1	.000	Semifinals
2021	NU	6th	14	6	8	.429	—	—	—	—	Eliminated
2022	NU	3rd	14	9	5	.643	1	0	1	.000	Semifinals
2023	NU	3rd	14	10	4	.714	1	0	1	.000	Semifinals
2024	NU	7th	14	5	9	.357	—	—	—	—	Eliminated
2025	NU	1st	14	11	3	.786	2	0	2	.000	Semifinals
Totals			110	61	49	.583	5	1	4	.200	0 championships

Preceded by Aldin Ayo	Letran Knights men's basketball head coach 2016–2018	Succeeded by Bonnie Tan
Preceded by Jamike Jarin	NU Bulldogs men's basketball head coach 2020–present	Succeeded by incumbent
