= UP Fighting Maroons men's basketball =

Philippine collegiate varsity team

UP Fighting Maroons
2026 UP Fighting Maroons basketball team
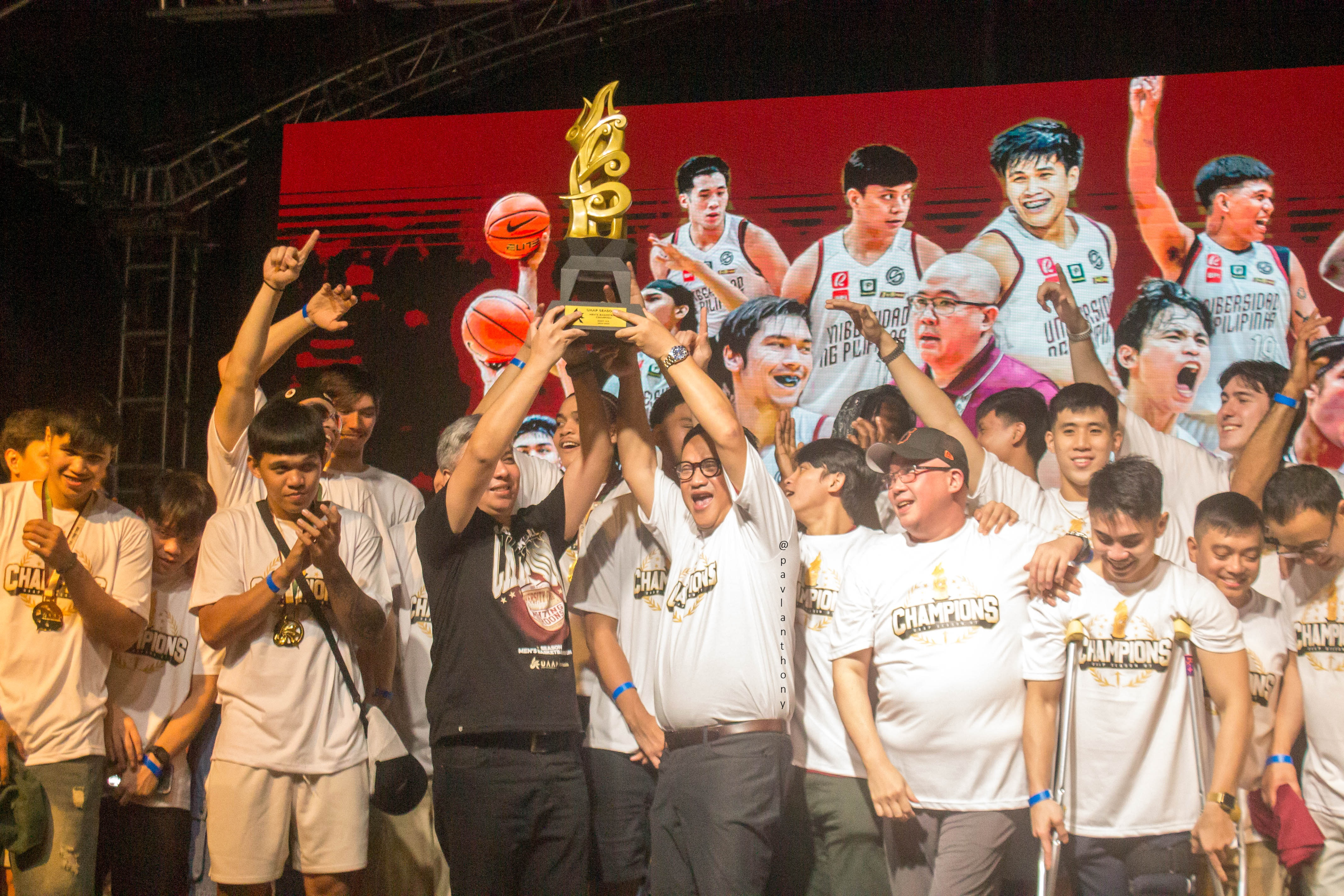
- UP Fighting Maroons men's basketball with 22nd UP president Angelo Jimenez during UAAP Season 87
- University: University of the Philippines Diliman
- Founded: Early 20th century
- History: UP Maroons (until 1930s); UP Parrots (1930s–1990s); UP Fighting Maroons (1990s–present)
- Head coach: Goldwyn Monteverde (6th season)
- Location: U.P. Campus, Quezon City
- Nickname: Fighting Maroons
- Colors: Maroon and Forest Green

UAAP Champion (4)
- 1940; 1986; 2022 (Note: The 2021–22 season of the men's basketball tournament was delayed to the first half of 2022 due to the COVID-19 pandemic.); 2024

NCAA Champion (4)
- 1924; 1925; 1926; 1929

The UP Fighting Maroons are the collegiate men's basketball team of the University of the Philippines Diliman, which play in the University Athletic Association of the Philippines (UAAP), the premiere sports league in the country.

== Etymology ==
The "Fighting Maroons" name is derived from the Maroons, escaped African slaves in the Caribbean. UP was formerly known as the "Maroons" in the 1920s, derived from the color of their uniforms, then as the "UP Parrots" starting in the 1930s, until it was changed to the current "UP Fighting Maroons" in the 1990s.

== History ==
UP is one of the founding members (1938) of the UAAP. It was also a founding member and the originator of the National Collegiate Athletic Association (NCAA) in 1924. Prior to the establishment of the Diliman campus, the campus was in what is now University of the Philippines Manila.

The Fighting Maroons won their first championship title in the inaugural season of the NCAA (1924–1925). They also became the champions in NCAA Season 1 (1925–1926), and NCAA Season 2 (1926–1927), winning three consecutive titles. The Fighting Maroons won their last championship in the NCAA in Season 5 (1929–1930). After six years, the Fighting Maroons permanently withdrew from competing in NCAA.

In 1938, Far Eastern University, National University, the University of the Philippines and the University of Santo Tomas formed the University Athletic Association of the Philippines. UP Fighting Maroons won their first championship in the UAAP in UAAP Season 2 (1939–1940).

As of 2026, the Fighting Maroons have won four championship titles in UAAP men's basketball.

== Current roster ==
UP Fighting Maroons roster
Players
Coaches

Pos.	No.	Nat.	Name	Height	Year	High School
G/F	2	(Canada)	Dimaculangan, Elliot Carl	6'4" (1.93m)	4th	Toronto Basketball Academy
G	3	(Philippines)	Franco, Seann Kionel	6'2" (1.88m)	1st	Arellano University High School
G/F	8	(United States)	Bayla, Jacob	6'6" (1.98m)	3rd	Valley Christian High School
F/C	9	(Nigeria)	Nnoruka, Francis	6'9" (2.06m)	2nd	NU Nazareth School
G	11	(Philippines)	Ogana, Russell	6'2" (1.88m)	3rd	EAC High School
F	15	(Philippines)	Pre, Francis Veejay	6'5" (1.96m)	3rd	FEU-Diliman
G	16	(Philippines)	Remogat, Rey-Adrian (C)	5'11" (1.8m)	5th	FEU-Diliman
F	17	(Philippines)	Palanca, Juancho Miguel	6'7" (2.01m)	1st	NU Nazareth School
G	18	(Philippines)	Payosing, James (C)	6'2" (1.88m)	4th	Jose Maria College - High School
G	23	(Philippines)	Maga, Rainer	6'0" (1.83m)	4th	San Beda High School
F	27	(Philippines)	Andres, L.A. John	6'7" (2.01m)	5th	St. Mary of the Woods School
F	30	(United States)	Yniguez, Miguel Alfredo	6'6" (1.98m)	2nd	Canyon Crest Academy
C	33	(United States)	Alter, Sean Stark	6'9" (2.06m)	4th	Volcano Vista High School
F/C	55	(United States)	Stevens, Jalen Isagani	6'8" (2.03m)	4th	North Community High School
F	77	(United States)	Briones, Lowell Francis Jr.	6'7" (2.01m)	4th	Sierra Vista High School
C	88	(Nigeria)	Ududo, Kingsley Onyedikachi	6'9" (2.06m)	1st	Guang Ming College
G	92	(Philippines)	Poyos, Arvie Jay	5'10" (1.78m)	3rd	Notre Dame of Kidapawan High School

Head coach

- (Philippines) Goldwin Monteverde

Assistant coach(es)

- (Philippines) Christian Luanzon (Lead Assistant Coach)
- (Philippines) Poch Juinio
- (Philippines) Eric Gonzales
- (Philippines) Edgar Macaraya
- (Philippines) Nok Atienza
- (Philippines) Vic Pablo
- (Philippines) Tom Chua
- (Philippines) Wilson Ang
- (Philippines) Ryan Alba
- (United States) Moriah Gingerich
- (Philippines) Dwight DeMayo (Strength and Conditioning Coach)

Team manager

- (Philippines) Atty. Agaton Uvero

Legend

- (C) Team captain
- Injured

== Head coaches ==
- 1981–1986: Joe Lipa
- 1991–1993: Rey Madrid
- 1994: Joe Lipa
- 1995: Orlando Bauzon
- 1995–1996: Eric Altamirano
- 1997–1999: Nic Jorge
- 2000–2002: Ryan Gregorio
- 2002: Allan Gregorio
- 2003–2005: Lito Vergara
- 2006–2007: Joe Lipa
- 2008–2010: Aboy Castro
  - 2010: Potit de Vera (interim)
  - 2010: Boyet Fernandez (acting)
- 2011–2013: Ricky Dandan
  - 2013: Rey Madrid (interim)
- 2014–2015: Rey Madrid
- 2015: Rensy Bajar
- 2016–2020: Bo Perasol
- 2021–present: Goldwin Monteverde

== Season-by-season records ==
Until 1997, the UAAP primarily ranked the teams by tournament points using FIBA's method. Starting in 1998, the UAAP primarily ranked by winning percentage. There's no difference in ranking once all games were played, but in the middle of the season, rankings made by these two methods may differ.

=== Until 1997 ===
Season	League	Elimination round					Playoffs			
Season	League	Pos	GP	W	L	Pts	GP	W	L	Results
1986	UAAP	2nd/8					2	2	0	Won Finals vs UE
1987	UAAP	3rd/8	14	9	5	16	Did not qualify, 3rd place			
1988	UAAP	3rd/8	14	10	4	23	Did not qualify, 3rd place			
1989	UAAP	5th/8	14	8	6	22	Did not qualify			
1990	UAAP	7th/8	14	4	10	18	Did not qualify			
1991	UAAP	4th/8	14				Did not qualify			
1992	UAAP	8th/8	14	5	9	19	Did not qualify			
1993	UAAP	7th/8	14	3	11	17	No playoffs held (Note: UST won all elimination round games. Based on the rules at that time, they were then named automatic champions, and other teams were ranked by elimination round finish.)			
1994	UAAP	5th/7	12	4	8	16	Did not qualify			
1995	UAAP	5th/8	14	5	9	19	Did not qualify			
1996	UAAP	3rd/8	14	9	5	23	1	0	1	Lost semifinals vs UST
1997	UAAP	4th/8	14	8	6	22	2	1	1	Lost semifinals vs FEU

=== Since 1998 ===
Season	League	Elimination round						Playoffs			
Season	League	Pos	GP	W	L	PCT	GB	GP	W	L	Results
1998	UAAP	5th/8	14	7	7	.500	6	1	0	1	Lost 4th seed playoff vs UST
1999	UAAP	6th/8	14	5	9	.429	6	Did not qualify			
2000	UAAP	6th/8	14	4	10	.286	8	Did not qualify			
2001	UAAP	7th/8	14	6	8	.429	6	Did not qualify			
2002	UAAP	6th/8	14	5	9	.357	8	Did not qualify			
2003	UAAP	7th/8	14	3	11	.214	8	Did not qualify			
2004	UAAP	5th/8	14	7	7	.500	4	Did not qualify			
2005	UAAP	5th/8	14	6	8	.429	6	Did not qualify			
2006	UAAP	6th/7	12	4	8	.333	6	Did not qualify			
2007	UAAP	8th/8	14	0	14	.000	14	Did not qualify			
2008	UAAP	6th/8	14	3	11	.214	10	Did not qualify			
2009	UAAP	8th/8	14	3	11	.214	10	Did not qualify			
2010	UAAP	8th/8	14	0	14	.000	12	Did not qualify			
2011	UAAP	8th/8	14	2	12	.143	11	Did not qualify			
2012	UAAP	8th/8	14	1	13	.071	11	Did not qualify			
2013	UAAP	8th/8	14	0	14	.000	10	Did not qualify			
2014	UAAP	7th/8	14	1	13	.071	10	Did not qualify			
2015	UAAP	7th/8	14	3	11	.214	8	Did not qualify			
2016	UAAP	6th/8	14	5	9	.357	8	Did not qualify			
2017	UAAP	5th/8	14	6	8	.429	7	Did not qualify			
2018	UAAP	3rd/8	14	8	6	.571	4	4	2	2	Lost Finals vs Ateneo
2019	UAAP	2nd/8	14	9	5	.643	5	2	0	2	Lost stepladder round 2 vs UST
2020 (Note: Season cancelled due to the COVID-19 pandemic.)	UAAP	Season canceled									
2022 (S84)	UAAP	2nd/8	14	12	2	.857	1	5	3	2	Won Finals vs Ateneo
2022 (S85)	UAAP	2nd/8	14	11	3	.786	—	4	2	2	Lost Finals vs Ateneo
2023	UAAP	1st/8	14	12	2	.857	—	4	2	2	Lost Finals vs La Salle
2024	UAAP	2nd/8	14	11	3	.786	1	4	3	1	Won Finals vs La Salle
2025	UAAP	2nd/8	14	10	4	.714	1	4	2	2	Lost Finals vs La Salle

== Honors ==
=== Team honors ===
- University Athletic Association of the Philippines (UAAP)
  - Champions (4): 1939, 1986, 2022, 2024
- National Collegiate Athletic Association (NCAA)
  - Champions (4): 1924, 1925, 1926, 1929
- Filoil EcoOil Preseason Cup
  - Champions (3): 2023, 2024, 2025

=== Player honors ===
- UAAP Most Valuable Player
  - Fort Acuña (1): 1968
  - Eric Altamirano (1): 1986
  - Bright Akhuetie (1): 2019
  - Malick Diouf (1): 2022
- UAAP Finals Most Valuable Player
  - Malick Diouf (1): 2022
  - JD Cagulangan (1): 2024
- UAAP Rookie of the Year
  - Benjie Paras: 1986
  - Woody Co: 2006
  - Kyles Jefferson Lao: 2013
  - Juan Gómez de Liaño: 2017
  - Carl Tamayo: 2022
  - Francis Lopez: 2023

== Notable players ==
- (Philippines) Gerry Abadiano
- (Philippines) (United States) Andre Paras
- (Philippines) Axel Doruelo
- (Philippines) Benjie Paras
- (Philippines) Bo Perasol
- (Nigeria) Bright Akhuetie
- (Philippines) Bryan Gahol
- (Philippines) Carl Tamayo
- (Philippines) CJ Cansino
- (Philippines) Diego Dario
- (Philippines) Dionisio Calvo
- (Philippines) Edward Juinio
- (Philippines) Eric Altamirano
- (Philippines) Fort Acuña
- (Philippines) Francis Lopez
- (Philippines) Goldwin Monteverde
- (Philippines) (Spain) Javi Gómez de Liaño
- (Philippines) Jay-R Reyes
- (Philippines) JD Cagulangan
- (Philippines) (Spain) Juan Gómez de Liaño
- (Philippines) Jireh Ibañes
- (Philippines) Jun Bernardino
- (Philippines) (United States) Kobe Paras
- (Philippines) Magi Sison
- (Philippines) Mariano Araneta
- (Philippines) Marvin Cruz
- (Philippines) Mikee Reyes
- (Philippines) Nic Jorge
- (Philippines) Patrick Aquino
- (Philippines) Paolo Mendoza
- (Philippines) Paul Desiderio
- (Philippines) (United States) Quentin Millora-Brown
- (Philippines) Raul Soyud
- (Philippines) Ronnie Magsanoc
- (Philippines) Ricci Rivero
- (Philippines) Ryan Gregorio
- (Philippines) Sam Marata
- (Philippines) Yeng Guiao

== See also ==
- University of the Philippines
- UP Fighting Maroons
