= Allan Gregorio =

- Born: 7 September 1992 (age 34); São Paulo, Brazil
- Education: Photography at SENAC São Paulo
- Occupations: Photographer and visual artist
- Years active: 2012–present
- Website: gregorio.io

Allan Gregorio (born 7 September 1992) is a Brazilian visual artist and portrait photographer. His work has been featured internationally in magazines such as Vogue, Attitude Magazine, The Face and Dazed.

== Career ==
Allan Gregorio was born in São Paulo. He became interested in drawing and painting at a young age. At age seventeen, he started working as an assistant for a photographer of his hometown. Later, he studied photography and graphic design at Serviço Nacional de Aprendizagem Comercial (SENAC) in São Paulo. Alongside his work as a photographer, Gregorio has also worked as a graphic designer and visual artist in other countries.

Gregorio has developed augmented reality filters for Instagram and Tiktok. Allan Gregorio is also an activist for LGBT+ rights.

== Selected publications ==
=== 2013–2015 ===
- 2013: Índia Shaman – Zupi Magazine
- 2013: In Bloom – MMSCENE
- 2014: Casa de Criadores – Égalité Magazine
- 2015: Made In – MMSCENE

=== 2016 ===
- 2016: Mykki Blanco – VOGUE
- 2016: The hedonistic beauty of Glastonbury's Block9 – Mixmag
- The world's wildest clubbing space – DJ Mag
- NYC Downlow 10th birthday – London Evening Standard
- People of Glastonbury's Outrageous LGBT Club NYC Downlow – Everfest
- A moment with Lucy Fizz – NAKID Magazine
- Taina Haines – NAKID Magazine
- A Conversation with AWAYTOMARS – FuckingYoung

=== 2018 ===
- Kyria Zoeter – MANUKA Magazine – Issue 5
- Milkshake Festival Amsterdam – Gayletter
