= UAAP Season 84 =

University athletic year

- "'Fully Alive. Champions for Life!"
- Host school: De La Salle University

Overall
- Seniors: University of Santo Tomas

Collegiate champions
Sport		Men	Women
Basketball		UP	NT
Volleyball		NT	NU
3x3 basketball		UST	NU
Beach volleyball		UST	NT
Chess		UST	NU
- Poomsae: UST (Coed)
- Cheerdance: FEU (Ex - Coed)

High School champions
Sport		Boys	Girls
- (NT) = No tournament; (DS) = Demonstration Sport; (Ex) = Exhibition;

UAAP Season 84 was the 2021–22 athletic year of the University Athletic Association of the Philippines (UAAP). The Season 84 theme was "Fully Alive, Champions for Life" and the season's host was the De La Salle University. With the limitations brought about by the COVID-19 pandemic, UAAP Season 84 only held men's basketball, men's and women's 3×3 basketball, women's volleyball, men's beach volleyball, cheerdance, taekwondo poomsae; and men's and women's chess tournaments as its events for the season. UST was declared UAAP general champion based on eight sporting events. Only the men's basketball, women's volleyball, and cheerdance were televised. The opening ceremony of Season 84 was presented virtually.

A new logo for the UAAP, selected from among the entries of a design competition, was unveiled during the opening ceremony for this season.

The season held its opening ceremony last March 26, 2022 at the SM Mall of Asia Arena in Pasay City. For Season 84, all basketball games were played in only one venue, the SM Mall of Asia Arena, unlike in previous seasons, games were played in 2 or 3 venues.

== Overview ==
UAAP Season 84 started with the men's basketball tournament on March 26, 2022, and was held in a full "bubble" set-up during the first four playing dates of the first round, meaning no fans were allowed inside the playing venue. However, on April 5, 2022, which was the fifth playing date of the basketball tournament, the UAAP opened its doors to fans at the Mall of Asia Arena. Ticket selling started on April 2, 2022.

Team staff and players were kept in their bubble setups, which necessitated closing off the patron and ringside areas to fans. Only lower box, upper box, and general admission tickets were offered to the public, and students were given discounts for the latter two sections. The league required all players to be fully vaccinated to play. Booster shots were not required. Two shots were sufficient to meet the fully vaccinated requirement. Basic health and safety protocols were enforced at the venue, including mask-wearing and social distancing. Fans were also not allowed to eat inside the event bowl; instead, the concourses outside were designated as eating areas.

The women's indoor volleyball tournament kicked off on May 5, 2022, and ran concurrently with other sports like beach volleyball, 3×3 basketball, taekwondo poomsae, and chess.

The UAAP capped Season 84 with four more events in the final week of May and the first week of June. The league announced the schedule of the remaining events in a press conference during the Cheerdance Competition on May 22, 2022.

The UAAP men's beach volleyball made its comeback after three years on May 27, 28, and 29, and on June 3, 4, and 5 at SM Sands By the Bay in Pasay City. Poomsae was staged on May 31 at the SM Mall of Asia Arena. The UAAP went out of town for the 3×3 competition in Calatagan, Batangas, on June 2 and 3. The chess tournament was held from June 1 to 5 at the Far Eastern University campus in Manila.

The UAAP had a successful return in the pandemic era, completing the Season 84 men's basketball tournament capped by a dramatic championship finish by the University of the Philippines, dethroning Ateneo in Game 3 of the Finals best-of-three series. The Cheerdance Competition also returned on Sunday, May 22, 2022, with FEU claiming the crown for the first time in 13 years. In the UAAP Season 84 poomsae tournament held on May 31, 2022, at the Coral Way of SM Mall of Asia Arena, the UST Tiger Jins won gold in the men's team, women's team, and mixed pair events to end La Salle's two-season reign. The University of Santo Tomas ruled the UAAP Season 84 3×3 men's basketball tournament on Friday, June 3, 2022, at CaSoBe resort in Calatagan, Batangas. The University of Santo Tomas ruled the UAAP men's beach volleyball tournament for the third straight season following a 28–26, 21–15 conquest of National University Sunday, June 5, 2022, at Sands SM By The Bay.

The women's volleyball tournament also finished its first round of elimination on May 19, 2022, and resumed after a one-week break by starting the second round of elimination. The elimination round ended on June 9. NU, La Salle, UST, and Ateneo were the top 4 teams after the elimination round. NU swept the elimination round with a 14–0 win-loss record and qualified outright for the Finals. La Salle, UST, and Ateneo qualified for the stepladder semi-finals of the tournament. Fourth-seeded Ateneo eliminated third-seeded UST in the first phase of the stepladder semis played on June 14, 2022, at SM MOA. Ateneo swept UST in 3 sets (3–0). With this win, Ateneo moved up the ladder and played second-seeded La Salle in the second phase of the stepladder semis on June 16, 2022. La Salle had a twice-to-beat advantage being the second-seeded team. La Salle ended Ateneo's Cinderella run in the semifinals with a 3–0 sweep. La Salle moved on to the best-of three series Finals to battle NU for the championship. NU won game 1 of the Finals with La Salle at the Mall of Asia Arena on June 18, 2022.

Rookies of the derailed Season 82 were all eligible for the Rookie of the Year Award in the UAAP Season 84 women's volleyball tournament. Season 82 was not counted as a playing year of the player's 5-year eligibility.

The UAAP provisionally changed its rule on the number of players in the basketball and volleyball rosters due to COVID-19 positive cases. Each team submitted a 16-player roster for basketball and a 14-player roster for volleyball, plus four reserves. Any of the four reserves may be elevated to the regular lineup only to replace a player in the regular lineup who is COVID positive and for no other reason, including injury. The four reserves did not give up a year of eligibility if they had not been elevated. If a reserve is elevated and plays no more than three games, the season is not counted against his years of eligibility.

UAAP also announced that the league amended one of its player eligibility rules temporarily. Players who were 26 years old were allowed to play for their universities, provided they did not turn 27 before the May cutoff, were still enrolled, and had a playing year left. Previously, the league only allowed players up to the age of 25 to play. This rule will be reverted to normal by Season 85.

The league began Season 85 in September.

== Basketball ==
The tournament started on March 26, 2022. Basketball games were played four times a day and three times a week. The reason behind the quick tournament was to prevent the student-athletes from being holed up in a bubble for too long. The men's basketball still followed the same format: A double-round group stage, semi-finals (final four), and best-of-three finals. All teams played in each of the play dates. This means that they played three times a week starting on March 26. The games were played every Tuesday, Thursday and Saturday with tip-offs at 11 a.m., 1, 4 and 7 p.m. However, the playing days of the Final Four games will run on a Wednesday, Friday and Sunday schedule instead of the elimination round schedule of Tuesday, Thursday and Saturday.

The UAAP basketball season ended on May 13 or before the PBA plans its next draft. This allowed outgoing UAAP players to apply for the PBA draft without jeopardizing their varsity eligibility.

=== Men's tournament ===
==== Elimination round ====
Pos	Team	W	L	PCT	GB	Qualification
1	Ateneo Blue Eagles	13	1	.929	—	Twice-to-beat in the semifinals
2	UP Fighting Maroons	12	2	.857	1	Twice-to-beat in the semifinals
3	De La Salle Green Archers (H)	9	5	.643	4	Twice-to-win in the semifinals
4	FEU Tamaraws	7	7	.500	6	Twice-to-win in the semifinals
5	Adamson Soaring Falcons	6	8	.429 (Note: Head-to-head record: Adamson 1–1 NU (Adamson +5))	7	
6	NU Bulldogs	6	8	.429	7	
7	UST Growling Tigers	3	11	.214	10	
8	UE Red Warriors	0	14	.000	13	

Source: UAAP Season 84 Men's Basketball Final Stats
Rules for classification: 1) winning percentage; 2) if tied for #2 or #4, one-game playoff; 3) head-to-head record; 4) head-to-head point differential; 5) overall point differential
(H) Hosts

==== Playoffs ====
Semifinals (Top 2 twice-to-beat)
1	Ateneo	85
4	FEU	72
2	UP	80	78
3	La Salle	83	74

Finals (Best-of-three playoff)
1	Ateneo	74	69	69
2	UP	81*	66	72*

*Overtime

== Volleyball ==
The UAAP Season 84 women's volleyball tournament started on May 5, 2022, under a closed-circuit setup at the Mall of Asia Arena, unlike the men's basketball tournament where it was a bubble setup.

Similar to the men's basketball tournament, however, the UAAP provisionally changed its rule on the number of players on the volleyball roster due to the still COVID-19 situation. Each team submitted a 14-woman roster plus four reserves. Any of the four reserves may be elevated to the regular lineup only to replace a player in the 14-man roster who is COVID positive and for no other reason, including injury. The four reserves did not give up a year of eligibility if they were not elevated. If a reserve is elevated and played no more than three games, the season is not counted against his years of eligibility.

=== Elimination round ===
==== Team standings ====
Pos	Team	Pld	W	L	Pts	SW	SL	SR	SPW	SPL	SPR	Qualification
1	NU Lady Bulldogs	14	14	0	42	42	5	8.400	1152	839	1.373	Advance to the finals (Note: As NU won all of their elimination round games, the stepladder format will be used instead of the regular Final Four format.)
2	De La Salle Lady Spikers (H)	14	10	4	30	33	17	1.941	1158	987	1.173	Twice-to-beat in stepladder round 2
3	UST Growling Tigresses	14	9	5	24	30	24	1.250	1217	1215	1.002	Proceed to stepladder round 1
4	Ateneo Lady Eagles	14	8 (Note: Fourth seed playoff: Ateneo 3–0 Adamson)	6	24	31	22	1.409	1207	1116	1.082	Proceed to stepladder round 1
5	Adamson Lady Falcons	14	8	6	27	31	23	1.348	1200	1091	1.100	
6	UP Lady Maroons	14	5	9	14	19	30	0.633	1016	1102	0.922	
7	UE Lady Warriors	14	1	13	4	6	40	0.150	840	1112	0.755	
8	FEU Lady Tamaraws	14	1	13	3	10	41	0.244	897	1225	0.732	

Source: The UAAP on Facebook
Rules for classification: 1) number of wins; 2) if tied for #2 or #4, one-game playoff; 3) match points; 4) sets ratio; 5) points ratio; 6) head-to-head record
(H) Host
Notes:

Stepladder round 1 (One-game playoff)
3	UST	0
4	Ateneo	3

Stepladder round 2 (No. 2 has twice-to-beat advantage)
2	La Salle	3
4	Ateneo	0

Finals (Best-of-three series)
1	NU	3	3
2	La Salle	0	0

== Performance sports ==
=== Cheerdance ===
The UAAP Season 84 cheerdance competition was held on May 22, 2022, at the Mall of Asia Arena in Pasay. Cheerdance competition is an exhibition event. Points for the overall championship are not awarded to the participating schools.

==== Team standings ====
Rank	Team	Order	Tumbling	Stunts	Tosses	Pyramids	Dance	Penalties	Points	Percentage
1	FEU Cheering Squad	4	91.5	93	90.5	91	361.5	0	727.5	90.93%
2	Adamson Pep Squad	5	84	85	82.5	84	353	0	688.5	86.06%
3	NU Pep Squad	2	86	89	86.5	86	339.5	6	681	85.12%
4	UST Salinggawi Dance Troupe	8	63	76	75	72	341	9	618	77.25%
5	UE Pep Squad	7	57	81	64	77	317.5	4	592.5	74.06%
6	UP Pep Squad	3	52.5	69	69	67	330	5	582.5	72.81%
7	DLSU Animo Squad	6	52	67	66	53	330.5	1	567.5	70.93%
8	Ateneo Blue Babble Battalion	1	48.5	65	67	55	263	10	488.5	61.06%

== General championship summary ==
The general champion is determined by a point system. The system gives 15 points to the champion team of a UAAP event, 12 to the runner-up, and 10 to the third placer. The following points: 8, 6, 4, 2 and 1 are given to the rest of the participating teams according to their order of finish.

=== Medals table ===
Rank	Team	Gold	Silver	Bronze	Total
1	University of Santo Tomas	4	1	0	5
2	National University	3	2	0	5
3	University of the Philippines Diliman	1	1	2	4
4	De La Salle University*	0	3	3	6
5	Ateneo de Manila University	0	1	1	2
6	Adamson University	0	0	1	1
6	Far Eastern University	0	0	1	1
8	University of the East	0	0	0	0
Totals (8 entries)		8	8	8	24

* Host nation (Season host); General champions
Notes: Results are final.

=== General championship tally ===
		Basketball	3x3 basketball		Volleyball (indoor)	Volleyball (beach)	Chess		Taekwondo	Total			
Rank	Team	M	M	W	W	M	M	W	C	M	W	C	Overall
1	UST	2	15	12	8	15	15	2	15	47	22	15	84
2	NU	4	8	15	15	12	—	15	12	24	45	12	81
3	La Salle (H)	10	12	2	12	10	8	12	10	40	26	10	76
4	UP	15	10	10	4	8	12	4	8	45	18	8	71
5	Ateneo	12	4	6	10	6	6	8	6	28	24	6	58
6	Adamson	6	6	8	6	2	4	10	—	18	24	0	42
7	FEU	8	2	4	1	4	10	6	4	24	11	4	39
8	UE	1	—	—	2	—	—	—	—	1	2	0	3

(H) Season host; = Champion; = Runner-up; = Third place; — = No team.
Notes: Results are final.

== Media ==
In 2020, after canceling UAAP Season 83, the UAAP announced a new media rights deal with Cignal TV. The contract runs until 2026. In September 2021, both parties announced the creation of UAAP Varsity Channel, a high definition TV channel initially airing best UAAP games, and eventually live games and repeats. Just prior this season's opening, both parties announced that live UAAP games would be aired on One Sports free-to-air channel with final four and finals games on TV5, UAAP Varsity Channel on pay TV, and Cignal Play on over-the-top streaming. In Cignal TV's coverage, courtside reporters are now called "correspondents," and several personalities openly associated with UAAP member schools are including in the TV coverage. Personalities who covered the UAAP in the ABS-CBN broadcast were also included. In May 2022, international viewers can now watch UAAP games through streaming site iWantTFC after ABS-CBN made a partnership deal with Cignal.

Sports Broadcasters for Basketball

Sports commentator

- Bea Daez-Fabros
- Boom Gonzalez
- Mico Halili
- Nikko Ramos
- Jude Turcuato

Color commentator

- Norman Black
- Jvee Casio
- Larry Fonacier
- Allan Gregorio
- Isaac Go
- Jett Manuel
- LA Tenorio
- Jason Webb
- Willy Wilson

== See also ==
- NCAA Season 97
