= UAAP Season 49 men's basketball tournament =

Basketball competition in the Philippines

1986 UAAP season
- Host school: National University
Men's Finals	G1	G2	Wins
UE Red Warriors	75	89	0+1
UP Fighting Maroons	86	98	2
- Duration: October 25-27, 1986
- Arena(s): ULTRA
- Winning coach: Joe Lipa (1st title)
- TV network(s): IBC, PTV

The 1986 UAAP men's basketball tournament was the 49th year of the men's tournament of the University Athletic Association of the Philippines (UAAP)'s basketball championship. Hosted by National University, the UP Fighting Maroons defeated the UE Red Warriors in the finals taking their first UAAP men's basketball championship in 47 years. Prior to the start of the season, De La Salle University was admitted as the eighth member school of the league.

== Elimination round ==
Tournament format:

- Double round robin; the two teams with the best records advance Finals:
  - The #1 seed will only need to win once to clinch the championship.
  - The #2 seed has to win twice to clinch the championship.

== Finals ==
Number 1 seed UE only has to win once, while number 2 seed UP has to win twice, to clinch the championship.

October 25

UE Red Warriors	75–86	UP Fighting Maroons

ULTRA, Pasig

October 27

UE Red Warriors	89–98	UP Fighting Maroons
UP wins series in two games

ULTRA, Pasig

- Most Valuable Player: Eric Altamirano (UP Fighting Maroons)

After 47 years of frustration, the State University, which is more famous for producing personalities from the various spectrum of the society, finally made a name for itself in the field of varsity basketball.

After five years of bench bitterness, Lipa, the new miracle man of amateur caging, realized a dream which had slipped from his hand twice in the last five years.

In the final seconds of the game between UP and University of the East, UP held a lead. The game occurred following the 1983 championship against Far Eastern University.

The fans were kept at the edge of their seats by the last ditch, desperate fullcourt press by the dethroned Warriors, proud owners of 18 UAAP titles. A pocket of UP supporters at the gallery were undecided whether to unfurl the championship streamer or not. The Maroons were leading FEU in 1983, only to lose by a slim margin. Finally, the final horn blared and all frustrations were erased.

== See also ==
- NCAA Season 62 basketball tournaments

Preceded by Season 48 (1985)	UAAP basketball seasons Season 49 (1986)	Succeeded by Season 50 (1987)
