= UAAP Season 81 basketball tournaments =

Basketball season

UAAP Season 81
- "It All Begins Here"
- Host school: National University
Men's Finals	G1	G2	Wins
Ateneo Blue Eagles	88	99	2
UP Fighting Maroons	79	81	0
- Duration: December 1–5, 2018
- Arena(s): Mall of Asia Arena; Smart Araneta Coliseum
- Finals MVP: Thirdy Ravena
- Winning coach: Tab Baldwin (2nd title)
- Semifinalists: Adamson Soaring Falcons; FEU Tamaraws
- TV network(s): ABS-CBN Sports and Action; Liga; ABS-CBN
Women's Finals	G1	G2	Wins
NU Lady Bulldogs	71	67	2
FEU Lady Tamaraws	59	61	0
- Duration: December 1–5, 2018
- Arena(s): Mall of Asia Arena; Smart Araneta Coliseum
- Finals MVP: Jack Animam
- Winning coach: Patrick Aquino (5th title)
- Semifinalists: UST Growling Tigresses; Adamson Lady Falcons
- TV network(s): ABS-CBN Sports and Action
Juniors' Finals	G1	G2	Wins
NUNS Bullpups	70	64	2
Ateneo Blue Eaglets	58	53	0
- Duration: February 18–22, 2019
- Arena(s): Filoil Flying V Centre
- Finals MVP: Carl Tamayo
- Winning coach: Goldwin Monteverde (1st title)
- Semifinalists: FEU–D Baby Tamaraws; Adamson Baby Falcons
- TV network(s): ABS-CBN Sports and Action

The UAAP Season 81 basketball tournaments were the University Athletic Association of the Philippines (UAAP) basketball tournaments for the 2018–19 school year.

Former NU Bulldogs athletic director Junel Baculi replaced Rebo Saguisag as commissioner for the season's basketball tournaments on August 28, 2018. Former Vietnam Basketball Association commissioner Tonichi Pujante was also appointed as assistant commissioner.

The senior men's and women's tournaments began on September 8, 2018 while the games of the juniors' division began on November 11.

The Ateneo Blue Eagles and the NU Lady Bulldogs successfully defended their championships this season. Ateneo finished first after the elimination round, followed by Adamson. UP, FEU and La Salle finished tied for third, with UP getting the #3 seed due to tiebreakers. FEU defeated La Salle in the playoff for the #4 seed, and were beaten by Ateneo in the semifinals. Adamson lost out in the semifinals again, losing to UP, who have never been in the semifinals since 1998. Qualifying to its first UAAP Finals since 1986, UP was swept by Ateneo in the latter's second consecutive (and tenth overall) UAAP title. Thirdy Ravena was named Finals MVP, after scoring a still-standing UAAP Finals record of 38 points in the title-clinching Game 2.

The NU Lady Bulldogs won all elimination round games, qualifying to the Finals outright. FEU emerged through the stepladder playoffs that also involved UST and Adamson as NU's Finals opponent, but were still swept by the Lady Bulldogs. NU won its fifth consecutive title, all unbeaten seasons, for a still-standing league record of 80–0 in the last five tournaments.

In the Juniors' Division, the NU Bullpups and the Ateneo Blue Eaglets finished the elimination round with the top two seeds. NU eliminated the Adamson Baby Falcons, the only team that defeated them in the eliminations, while Ateneo defeated FEU Baby Tamaraws. In the rematch of last year's finals, the Bullpups defeated the defending champions, by winning all two Finals games. The Bullpups won their fourth title since 2011.

== Teams ==
All eight member universities of the UAAP fielded teams in all three divisions.

University	Men's team	Women's team	Juniors' team
Adamson University	Soaring Falcons	Lady Falcons	Baby Falcons
Ateneo de Manila University	Blue Eagles	Lady Eagles	Blue Eaglets
De La Salle University	Green Archers	Lady Archers	Junior Archers
Far Eastern University	Tamaraws	Lady Tamaraws	Baby Tamaraws
National University	Bulldogs	Lady Bulldogs	Bullpups
University of the East	Red Warriors	Lady Warriors	Junior Warriors
University of the Philippines Diliman	Fighting Maroons	Lady Maroons	Junior Maroons
University of Santo Tomas	Growling Tigers	Tigresses	Tiger Cubs

=== Coaches ===
University	Men's coach	Women's coach	Juniors' coach
Adamson University	(Philippines) Franz Pumaren	(Philippines) Ewon Arayi	(Philippines) Mike Fermin
Ateneo de Manila University	(United States) Tab Baldwin	(Philippines) Anthony John Flores	(Philippines) Reggie Varilla
De La Salle University	(Philippines) Louie Gonzalez	(Philippines) Pocholo Villanueva	(Philippines) Boris Aldeguer
Far Eastern University	(Philippines) Olsen Racela	(Philippines) Bert Flores	(Philippines) Michael Oliver
National University	(Philippines) Jamike Jarin	(Philippines) Patrick Aquino	(Philippines) Goldwin Monteverde
University of the East	(Philippines) Joe Silva	(Philippines) Aileen Lebornio	(Philippines) Florence Conlu
University of the Philippines Diliman	(Philippines) Bo Perasol	(Philippines) Kenneth Marius Raval	(Philippines) Paolo Mendoza
University of Santo Tomas	(Philippines) Aldin Ayo	(Philippines) Haydee Ong	(Philippines) Bonnie Garcia

=== Coaching changes ===
Team	Outgoing coach	Manner of departure	Date	Replaced by	Date
UST Growling Tigers	Boy Sablan	Fired	November 21, 2017	Aldin Ayo	January 8, 2018
UE Red Warriors	Derrick Pumaren	Resigned	November 22, 2017	Joe Silva	May 2, 2018
De La Salle Green Archers	Aldin Ayo	Signed with UST Growling Tigers	January 3, 2018	Louie Gonzalez	January 4, 2018
UST Tiger Cubs	Chris Cantonjos	Resigned	February 21, 2018	Bonnie Garcia	April 6, 2018
Ateneo Blue Eaglets	Joe Silva	Resigned	April 10, 2018	Reggie Varilla	April 10, 2018

== Venues ==
The Mall of Asia Arena in Pasay and the Smart Araneta Coliseum in Quezon City were the primary venues for the men's tournament, and the venues for the finals series for the women's tournament. The Filoil Flying V Centre in San Juan and the Blue Eagle Gym in Quezon City were the alternate venues for the men's and women's tournament, respectively and the main venue for the women's and juniors' tournaments.

In the second round of the men's tournament, two game days were scheduled at the Ynares Center in Antipolo.

== Men's tournament ==
=== Elimination round ===
==== Team standings ====
Pos	Team	W	L	PCT	GB	Qualification
1	Ateneo Blue Eagles	12	2	.857	—	Twice-to-beat in the semifinals
2	Adamson Soaring Falcons	10	4	.714	2	Twice-to-beat in the semifinals
3	UP Fighting Maroons	8	6	.571 (Note: Head-to-head record: UP 3–1, FEU 2–2, La Salle 1–3; Fourth-seed playoff: FEU 71–70 La Salle)	4	Twice-to-win in the semifinals
4	FEU Tamaraws	8	6	.571	4	Twice-to-win in the semifinals
5	De La Salle Green Archers	8	6	.571	4	
6	UST Growling Tigers	5	9	.357	7	
7	NU Bulldogs (H)	4	10	.286	8	
8	UE Red Warriors	1	13	.071	11	

Source: ABS-CBN Sports
Rules for classification: 1) winning percentage; 2) if tied for #2 or #4, one-game playoff; 3) head-to-head record; 4) head-to-head point differential; 5) overall point differential
(H) Hosts

==== Match-up results ====
	Round 1							Round 2						
Team ╲ Game	1	2	3	4	5	6	7	8	9	10	11	12	13	14
Adamson	Ateneo school colors	UE school colors	UST school colors	UP school colors	NU school colors	FEU school colors	La Salle school colors	NU school colors	La Salle school colors	UP school colors	Ateneo school colors	UST school colors	UE school colors	FEU school colors
Ateneo	Adamson school colors	UP school colors	NU school colors	UE school colors	UST school colors	La Salle school colors	FEU school colors	UP school colors	FEU school colors	UE school colors	NU school colors	Adamson school colors	La Salle school colors	UST school colors
La Salle	FEU school colors	NU school colors	UE school colors	UP school colors	UST school colors	Ateneo school colors	Adamson school colors	UE school colors	Adamson school colors	FEU school colors	UST school colors	NU school colors	Ateneo school colors	UP school colors
FEU	La Salle school colors	UST school colors	UP school colors	UE school colors	NU school colors	Adamson school colors	Ateneo school colors	UST school colors	Ateneo school colors	UP school colors	La Salle school colors	UE school colors	NU school colors	Adamson school colors
NU	UST school colors	La Salle school colors	Ateneo school colors	Adamson school colors	FEU school colors	UP school colors	UE school colors	Adamson school colors	UST school colors	Ateneo school colors	UP school colors	La Salle school colors	FEU school colors	UE school colors
UE	UP school colors	Adamson school colors	La Salle school colors	Ateneo school colors	FEU school colors	UST school colors	NU school colors	La Salle school colors	UP school colors	Ateneo school colors	UST school colors	FEU school colors	Adamson school colors	NU school colors
UP	UE school colors	Ateneo school colors	FEU school colors	Adamson school colors	La Salle school colors	NU school colors	UST school colors	Ateneo school colors	UE school colors	FEU school colors	Adamson school colors	NU school colors	UST school colors	La Salle school colors
UST	NU school colors	FEU school colors	Adamson school colors	Ateneo school colors	La Salle school colors	UE school colors	UP school colors	FEU school colors	NU school colors	UE school colors	La Salle school colors	Adamson school colors	UP school colors	Ateneo school colors

= Win; = OT win; = Loss; = OT loss

==== Scores ====
Results on top and to the right of the dashes are for first-round games; those to the bottom and to the left of it are second-round games.

Teams	AdU	AdMU	DLSU	FEU	NU	UE	UP	UST
Adamson Soaring Falcons	—	74–70	78–79*	85–88*	63–58	90–76	69–68	79–71
Ateneo Blue Eagles	62–48	—	71–55	60–63	72–46	89–62	87–79	85–53
De La Salle Green Archers	50–57	62–71	—	61–68	80–76	82–72	61–67	99–72
FEU Tamaraws	82–56	62–82	57–65	—	73–68	65–90	89–73	74–76
NU Bulldogs	58–69	64–79	77–84	74–79	—	88–61	88–89	75–70
UE Red Warriors	72–85	70–90	59–79	61–80	71–79	—	58–87	66–80
UP Fighting Maroons	72–80	66–83	97–81	95–82	82–71	94–81	—	72–86
UST Growling Tigers	83–96	62–102	69–110	78–70	61–69	79–68	69–83	—

Legend: Blue = left column team win; Red = top row team win.
Matches with lighter background shading were decided after overtime.

=== Fourth seed playoff ===
The Tamaraws and the Green Archers last met in the fourth seed playoff in 2012 in which La Salle won. The winner faces Ateneo in the semifinals while the loser gets eliminated.

S+A

November 21
3:30 p.m.PHT

Stats

FEU Tamaraws	71–70	De La Salle Green Archers
Scoring by quarter: 22–21, 14–17, 18–13, 17–19
Pts: Arvin Tolentino15; Rebs: Barkley Eboña 16; Asts: Jasper Parker 5		Pts: Leonard Santillan 20; Rebs: Justine Baltazar 9 Asts: Aljun Melecio 6
FEU advances to the Final Four

Smart Araneta Coliseum
Referees: Allan Manzano, Don Arguelles, Garry Villanueva

Prior to the game both teams were having ups and downs into this match-up, after losing their first four games in the second round FEU manage to win their last three games to salvage their season, while La Salle sitting as the #4 and #3 throughout the season lost their last two games that denied them a chance for the last twice-to-beat advantage and a slot in the semifinals. In the first quarter, the Tamaraws were leading already by seven points, 17–10, towards the end of that period but the Green Archers countered it with an 11–2 run to take the lead by two points, 21–19. An Axel Iñigo buzzer beater 3-point shot regained the lead for FEU as they took a single-point lead. In the second quarter, both teams exchanged blows but La Salle took matters the most to lead by two points at halftime, 38–36. In the third quarter, FEU pounced La Salle into a corner with a five-point lead but La Salle cut the deficit by three points, 54–51, heading into the final period. In the fourth quarter, the Tamaraws were trying to pull away while the Green Archers were trying to catch up. La Salle eventually crept up tying the game and regained the lead. FEU's Prince Orizu fouled out of the game as Barkley Eboña returned to the game despite suffering from cramps earlier. La Salle took advantage of it as they led by four points towards the last two minutes of the game. However, FEU went within striking distance going toe to toe against La Salle cutting the lead by a single basket. The Green Archers swung back the lead by four, 70–66. with less than a minute remaining in the game. In an inbound play, Jasper Parker passed the ball to Ken Tuffin and converted his jumper and cut La Salle's lead by two points with less than 40 seconds remaining. Off a timeout, La Salle inbounded a pass but turned the ball over as it paved the way for FEU to steal the game from them. After the timeout, FEU had the possession with Parker holding the ball as he found a wide open Arvin Tolentino who shot a three-pointer to take the lead for FEU, 71–70, with 3.1 seconds remaining. In La Salle's final possession, Aljun Melecio found an open Leonard Santillan to win the game for them but eventually he was blocked by three FEU defenders winning the Tamaraws the game. Arvin Tolentino, who had a season plagued with controversy, led the scoring for FEU with 15 points with three three-pointers made including the last shot that sealed the game for them, while Barkley Eboña, one of the unsung heroes for FEU, finished with a double-double of 12 points and 16 rebounds.

=== Bracket ===
Semifinals (Top 2 twice-to-beat)
1	Ateneo	80
4	FEU	61
2	Adamson	71	87
3	UP	73	89*

Finals (Best-of-three playoff)
1	Ateneo	88	99
3	UP	79	81

*Overtime

=== Semifinals ===
Ateneo and Adamson had the twice to beat advantage. Ateneo qualified for its fifth consecutive Final Four appearance, and the second consecutive year where they are the first seed. Adamson, the second seed, was in its third consecutive appearance, and improved on last year's third seed. Third seed UP qualified for its first Final Four appearance in 21 years, last appearing in the playoffs in 1997. FEU advanced to the Final Four in its sixth consecutive season, the longest active streak.

==== (1) Ateneo vs. (4) FEU ====
Ateneo had the twice-to-beat advantage. Ateneo has faced FEU in the semifinals in three consecutive seasons where the Blue Eagles won the last two series.

S+A

November 25
3:30 p.m.PHT

Stats

Ateneo Blue Eagles	80–61	FEU Tamaraws
Scoring by quarter: 17–9, 21–15, 21–12, 21–25
Pts: Thirdy Ravena 22; Rebs: Ange Kouame 11; Asts: Thirdy Ravena 4		Pts: Barkley Eboña 9 Rebs: Ken Tuffin 12; Asts: Axel Iñigo 3
Ateneo wins series in one game

Smart Araneta Coliseum
Referees: Nestor Sambrano, Ariel Bermeo, Emman Faraon

Ateneo started off with all cylinders on fire highlighted by two consecutive dunks by Thirdy Ravena to start the game on an 8–0 start despite FEU finally converted their shots with two consecutive three-pointers to cut the deficit by four points. However, the Tamaraws never had a chance to catch up against the Blue Eagles as they were blown out by as many as 31 points towards the end of the 3rd quarter. Ateneo outscored FEU in every quarter except in the last period as they didn't needed to use their twice to beat advantage after going wire to wire in the past few seasons. They finally marched on to their third consecutive Finals appearance and twelfth overall in the Final Four era.

==== (2) Adamson vs. (3) UP ====
Adamson had the twice-to-beat advantage. The Falcons and the Fighting Maroons were in their first playoff match-up against each other. The winner of the series would be the seventh team to qualify in the Finals in the Final Four era.

S+A

November 24
3:30 p.m.PHT

Stats

Adamson Soaring Falcons	71–73	UP Fighting Maroons
Scoring by quarter: 16–17, 13–11, 14–26, 28–19
Pts: Papi Sarr 23; Rebs: Papi Sarr 9 Asts: Jerrick Ahanmisi 4		Pts: Desiderio, Ju. Gómez de Liaño, 19 each Rebs: Bright Akhuetie 14; Asts: Paul Desiderio 4

Mall of Asia Arena
Attendance: 14,657
Referees: Ariel Bermeo, Allan Manzano, Don Arguelles

S+A

November 28
3:30 p.m.PHT

Stats

Adamson Soaring Falcons	87–89 (OT)	UP Fighting Maroons
Scoring by quarter: 16–26, 26–25, 25–13, 11–14, Overtime: 9–11
Pts: Jerrick Ahanmisi 20; Rebs: Papi Sarr 15; Asts: Jerom Lastimosa 5		Pts: Juan Gómez de Liaño 30; Rebs: Bright Akhuetie 17; Asts: Jun Manzo 4
UP wins series in two games

Smart Araneta Coliseum
Attendance: 20,944
Referees: Garry Villanueva, Emman Faraon, Ribel Cañelas

In the first game of the series, both teams exchanged leads in the 1st half with UP taking the 1st quarter while Adamson taking the 2nd to nudge by a point at halftime. But the Fighting Maroons outscored the Falcons in the 3rd quarter 26–14 to take an 11-point lead heading into the 4th quarter. Adamson refused to lose as they countered them with a 26-11 scoring run to lead by 4 but UP countered it back with a 6–0 run of their own to take a 71-69 heading into regulation. A costly foul by UP sends Sean Manganti to the free throw line as he converted both of his free throws. UP called a timeout with 3.7 seconds remaining in the game to strategize the play as Juan Gómez de Liaño from the inbound found an open Bright Akhuetie to seal the game for them as they forced a rubber match.

In the second game, the Fighting Maroons kept their guns ablaze as they led by ten points in the first quarter and nine points at half time. Their lead later ballooned already by 16 points, 60–44, but the Falcons countered it with their own scoring with a 23–4 run to take the lead at the end of the third quarter, 67–64. Both teams exchanged leads towards regulation as UP led by three points with less than ten seconds remaining, 78–75. Jerom Lastimosa shot a three-point shot to tie the game once again at 78-all with UP in ball possession. Paul Desiderio missed a shot as the game went into overtime. In the extra period Adamson took a six-point lead already, 84–78, with 2:39 remaining in overtime, but UP scored 6 straight points to tie once again at 84-all with 58.2 seconds remaining. Adamson's top gunner Jerrick Ahanmisi went down with cramps after a contested layup against Bright Akhuetie was waved off by the referee, instead calling it a foul on JD Tungcab on the floor. Ahanmisi missed the remainder of the game. Two free throws were awarded to Adamson because they were already in the penalty. Jonathan Espeleta came in to take the shots in place of Jerrick Ahanmisi but split his freethrows to lead by a point. A three-point shot by Paul Desiderio swang back the lead to UP 87–85 with forty seconds remaining but a foul by UP sent another Adamson player back into the free throw line and tied for one last time at 87-all. Desiderio's jumper over Sean Manganti however put UP back on top 89–87 with 6.6 seconds remaining with Adamson calling its last time out. The ball was given to Jerom Lastimosa to win the game but he missed a three-point shot that would give Adamson the victory, as UP won the game and entered the Finals for the first time since 1986.

=== Finals ===
The best-of-three finals began on December 1. It would be the first Finals match-up between the two teams. This marks UP's first UAAP Finals stint since 1986 and its first in the Final Four era, while defending champions Ateneo were in its third consecutive Finals appearance. The winner qualified for the 2018 PCCL National Collegiate Championship.

ABS-CBN
S+A

December 1
3:30 p.m.PHT

Stats

Ateneo Blue Eagles	88–79	UP Fighting Maroons
Scoring by quarter: 26–18, 13–20, 24–23, 25–18
Pts: Matt Nieto 27; Rebs: Ange Kouame 12; Asts: Thirdy Ravena 9		Pts: Jun Manzo 19; Rebs: Juan Gómez de Liaño 8 Asts: Paul Desiderio 8

Mall of Asia Arena
Attendance: 21,608
Referees: Allan Manzano, Don Arguelles, Sam del Rosario

S+A

December 5
3:30 p.m.PHT

Stats

Ateneo Blue Eagles	99–81	UP Fighting Maroons
Scoring by quarter: 25–13, 23–24, 22–19, 29–25
Pts: Thirdy Ravena 38; Rebs: Ange Kouame 20; Asts: Thirdy Ravena 6		Pts: Juan Gómez de Liaño 24; Rebs: Bright Akhuetie 8 Asts: 4 players, 3 each
Ateneo wins series, 2–0

Smart Araneta Coliseum
Attendance: 23,471
Referees: Ronwaldo de Luna, Garry Villanueva, Ribel Cañelas

- Finals Most Valuable Player: Thirdy Ravena (Ateneo Blue Eagles)

=== Awards ===
UAAP Season 81 men's basketball champions
Ateneo Blue Eagles
Tenth title, second consecutive title

- Most Valuable Player: Bright Akhuetie (UP Fighting Maroons)
- Rookie of the Year: Ange Kouame (Ateneo Blue Eagles)
- Mythical Team:
  - Bright Akhuetie (UP Fighting Maroons)
  - Juan Gómez de Liaño (UP Fighting Maroons)
  - Alvin Pasaol (UE Red Warriors)
  - Justine Baltazar (De La Salle Green Archers)
  - Jerrick Ahanmisi (Adamson Soaring Falcons)

==== Sponsored awards ====
- Manulife Playmaker of the Season: Juan Gómez de Liaño (UP Fighting Maroons)
- Milo Nutri-up Up Your Galing Performance Award: Juan Gómez de Liaño (UP Fighting Maroons)
- Appeton Most Improved Player of the Season: Sean Manganti (Adamson Soaring Falcons)
- PSBankable Player of the Season: Sean Manganti (Adamson Soaring Falcons)

==== Players of the Week ====
Week ending	Player	Team
September 9	(Philippines) Jerrick Ahanmisi	Adamson Soaring Falcons
September 12	(Philippines) Renzo Subido	UST Growling Tigers
September 23	(Philippines) Justine Baltazar	De La Salle Green Archers
September 30	(Philippines) Sean Manganti	Adamson Soaring Falcons
October 8	(Philippines) Wendell Comboy	FEU Tamaraws
October 15	(Philippines) CJ Cansino	UST Growling Tigers
October 22	(Ivory Coast) Ange Kouame	Ateneo Blue Eagles
October 29	(Philippines) CJ Cansino	UST Growling Tigers
November 5	(Philippines) Aljun Melecio	De La Salle Green Archers
November 12	(Nigeria) Bright Akhuetie	UP Fighting Maroons
November 19	(Philippines) Juan Gómez de Liaño	UP Fighting Maroons

=== Statistics ===
==== Players' statistical points ====
#	Player	Team	Total
1	(Nigeria) Bright Akhuetie	UP Fighting Maroons	82.5000
2	(Ivory Coast) Ange Kouame	Ateneo Blue Eagles	76.2143
3	(Philippines) Alvin Pasaol	UE Red Warriors	74.5714
4	(Philippines) Juan Gómez de Liaño	UP Fighting Maroons	63.8571
5	(Philippines) Justine Baltazar	De La Salle Green Archers	58.3846

==== Season player highs ====
Statistic	Player	Team	Average
Points	(Philippines) Alvin Pasaol	UE Red Warriors	24.4
Rebounds	(Nigeria) Bright Akhuetie	UP Fighting Maroons	14.6
Assists	(Philippines) Juan Gómez de Liaño	UP Fighting Maroons	5.5
Steals	(Philippines) Alvin Pasaol	UE Red Warriors	1.9
Blocks	(Ivory Coast) Ange Kouame	Ateneo Blue Eagles	3.2

==== Game player highs ====
Statistic	Player	Team	Total	Opponent
Points	(Philippines) John Lloyd Clemente (Philippines) Thirdy Ravena	NU Bulldogs; Ateneo Blue Eagles	38	FEU Tamaraws; UP Fighting Maroons
Rebounds	(Ivory Coast) Ange Kouame	Ateneo Blue Eagles	27	FEU Tamaraws
Assists	(Philippines) Philip Manalang (Philippines) Juan Gómez de Liaño	UE Red Warriors; UP Fighting Maroons	12	FEU Tamaraws; UE Red Warriors
Steals	(Philippines) Raffy Verano (Philippines) Alvin Pasaol	Ateneo Blue Eagles; UE Red Warriors	5	UP Fighting Maroons; FEU Tamaraws
Blocks	(Senegal) Issa Gaye	NU Bulldogs	8	UST Growling Tigers; UE Red Warriors

==== Game team highs ====
Statistic	Team	Total	Opponent
Points	De La Salle Green Archers	110	UST Growling Tigers
Rebounds	UST Growling Tigers	59	NU Bulldogs
Assists	UP Fighting Maroons	28	NU Bulldogs
Steals	Adamson Soaring Falcons	12	De La Salle Green Archers
Blocks	Adamson Soaring Falcons; De La Salle Green Archers	18	Ateneo Blue Eagles; FEU Tamaraws

==== Season team highs ====
Statistic	Team	Average
Points	UP Fighting Maroons	80.3
Rebounds	Ateneo Blue Eagles	47.1
Assists	UP Fighting Maroons	19.9
Steals	Adamson Soaring Falcons	7.2
Blocks	Ateneo Blue Eagles	5.6

=== Broadcast notes ===
ABS-CBN Sports is the official broadcaster of the UAAP Season 81 Men's Basketball games.

Game	Play-by-play	Analyst	Courtside Reporters
4th seed playoff	Boom Gonzales	Ronnie Magsanoc	Sydney Crespo and Aiyana Perlas
Semis #1 vs. #4	Mico Halili	Christian Luanzon	Frannie Reyes and Sydney Crespo
Semis #2 vs. #3, Game 1	Boom Gonzales	TJ Manotoc	Sam Corrales and Cor Catibayan
Semis #2 vs. #3, Game 2	Nikko Ramos	TJ Manotoc	Sam Corrales and Cor Catibayan
Finals, Game 1	Mico Halili	Ronnie Magsanoc	Frannie Reyes and Sam Corrales
Finals, Game 2	Nikko Ramos	Christian Luanzon	Frannie Reyes and Sam Corrales

== Women's tournament ==
=== Elimination round ===
==== Team standings ====
Pos	Team	W	L	PCT	GB	Qualification
1	NU Lady Bulldogs (H)	14	0	1.000	—	Advance to the Finals (Note: As NU won all of their elimination round games, the stepladder format will be used instead of the regular Final Four format.)
2	FEU Lady Tamaraws	9	5	.643 (Note: Second-seed playoff: FEU 67–63 Adamson)	5	Twice-to-beat in stepladder round 2
3	Adamson Lady Falcons	9	5	.643	5	Proceed to stepladder round 1
4	UST Growling Tigresses	8	6	.571 (Note: Fourth-seed playoff: UST 79–67 La Salle)	6	Proceed to stepladder round 1
5	De La Salle Lady Archers	8	6	.571	6	
6	Ateneo Lady Eagles	4	10	.286 (Note: Head-to-head record: Ateneo 2–0 UE)	10	
7	UE Lady Warriors	4	10	.286	10	
8	UP Fighting Maroons	0	14	.000	14	

Source: ABS-CBN Sports
Rules for classification: 1) winning percentage; 2) if tied for #2 or #4, one-game playoff; 3) head-to-head record; 4) head-to-head point differential; 5) overall point differential
(H) Hosts

==== Match-up results ====
	Round 1							Round 2						
Team ╲ Game	1	2	3	4	5	6	7	8	9	10	11	12	13	14
Adamson	La Salle school colors	FEU school colors	UST school colors	UE school colors	NU school colors	Ateneo school colors	UP school colors	UE school colors	NU school colors	UP school colors	UST school colors	La Salle school colors	FEU school colors	Ateneo school colors
Ateneo	UP school colors	UE school colors	NU school colors	FEU school colors	UST school colors	Adamson school colors	La Salle school colors	FEU school colors	UP school colors	UE school colors	NU school colors	UST school colors	La Salle school colors	Adamson school colors
La Salle	Adamson school colors	UE school colors	NU school colors	FEU school colors	UST school colors	UP school colors	Ateneo school colors	UE school colors	NU school colors	FEU school colors	UP school colors	Adamson school colors	Ateneo school colors	UST school colors
FEU	UE school colors	UP school colors	Adamson school colors	Ateneo school colors	La Salle school colors	UST school colors	NU school colors	Ateneo school colors	UST school colors	La Salle school colors	UE school colors	UP school colors	Adamson school colors	NU school colors
NU	UST school colors	Ateneo school colors	La Salle school colors	UP school colors	Adamson school colors	UE school colors	FEU school colors	La Salle school colors	Adamson school colors	UST school colors	Ateneo school colors	UE school colors	UP school colors	FEU school colors
UE	FEU school colors	Ateneo school colors	La Salle school colors	UP school colors	Adamson school colors	NU school colors	UST school colors	La Salle school colors	Adamson school colors	Ateneo school colors	FEU school colors	NU school colors	UST school colors	UP school colors
UP	Ateneo school colors	FEU school colors	UST school colors	UE school colors	NU school colors	La Salle school colors	Adamson school colors	Ateneo school colors	UST school colors	Adamson school colors	La Salle school colors	FEU school colors	NU school colors	UE school colors
UST	NU school colors	UP school colors	Adamson school colors	Ateneo school colors	La Salle school colors	FEU school colors	UE school colors	FEU school colors	UP school colors	NU school colors	Adamson school colors	Ateneo school colors	UE school colors	La Salle school colors

= Win; = OT win; = Loss; = OT loss

==== Scores ====
Results on top and to the right of the dashes are for first-round games; those to the bottom and to the left of it are second-round games.

Teams	AdU	AdMU	DLSU	FEU	NU	UE	UP	UST
Adamson Lady Falcons	—	72–54	57–72	59–55	62–92	61–49	68–51	55–85
Ateneo Lady Eagles	65–80	—	56–82	44–54	64–90	68–66	64–60	38–67
De La Salle Lady Archers	66–64	57–39	—	55–77	66–74	64–61	81–60	73–63
FEU Lady Tamaraws	69–73*	73–71	77–62	—	58–91	52–34	69–55	91–87***
NU Lady Bulldogs	86–58	76–52	111–64	68–44	—	80–53	109–46	79–71
UE Lady Warriors	75–76	63–69	86–69	57–64	59–89	—	49–40	51–53
UP Fighting Maroons	43–69	51–63	56–68	66–80	41–97	56–71	—	42–129
UST Tigresses	72–76	82–60	68–65	76–68	57–96	64–66	103–58	—

Legend: Blue = left column team win; Red = top row team win.
Matches with lighter background shading were decided after overtime.

=== Fourth seed playoff ===
This is a one-game playoff. The winner advances to the 1st round of the stepladder; the loser is eliminated.

November 21
9:00 a.m.PHT

Stats

De La Salle Lady Archers	67–79	UST Growling Tigresses
Scoring by quarter: 21–17, 12–21, 17–16, 17–25
Pts: Ana Castillo 20; Rebs: Johanna Arciga 8 Asts: Bettina Binaohan 5		Pts: Grace Irebu 29; Rebs: Grace Irebu 14; Asts: Ruby Portillo 8
UST advances to the Stepladder Round 1

Smart Araneta Coliseum

=== Second seed playoff ===
The winner advances to the 2nd round of the stepladder with the twice to beat advantage; the loser is relegated to the 1st round of the stepladder.

November 21
11:00 a.m.PHT

Stats

Adamson Lady Falcons	63–67	FEU Lady Tamaraws
Scoring by quarter: 17–15, 19–19, 14–20, 13–13
Pts: Jamie Alcoy 25; Rebs: Nat Prado 13; Asts: Mariz Cacho 3		Pts: Clare Castro 25; Rebs: Clare Castro 16; Asts: Fatima Quiapo 5
FEU wins the twice–to–beat advantage

Smart Araneta Coliseum

=== Bracket ===
Stepladder round 1 (Single-elimination)
3	Adamson	69
4	UST	78

Stepladder round 2 (No. 2 twice-to-beat)
2	FEU	68
4	UST	66

Finals (Best-of-three playoff)
1	NU	71	67
2	FEU	59	61

=== Stepladder semifinals ===
==== (3) Adamson vs. (4) UST ====
This is a one-game playoff. Adamson last faced UST in the semifinals in 2011 in which the Lady Falcons won.

November 25
11:00 a.m.PHT

Stats

Adamson Lady Falcons	69–78	UST Growling Tigresses
Scoring by quarter: 14–22, 11–21, 22–17, 22–18
Pts: Nat Prado 34; Rebs: Nat Prado 10; Asts: Kath Araja 5		Pts: Grace Irebu 28; Rebs: Grace Irebu 20; Asts: Clarice Aujero 7
UST advances to the Stepladder Round 2

Mall of Asia Arena

==== (2) FEU vs. (4) UST ====
FEU holds the twice to beat advantage. The Lady Tamaraws last faced the Tigresses in the first round of last year's stepladder semifinals where UST won.

S+A

November 28
9:00 a.m.PHT

Stats

FEU Lady Tamaraws	68–66	UST Growling Tigresses
Scoring by quarter: 16–12, 15–18, 22–13, 15–23
Pts: Clare Castro 32; Rebs: Clare Castro 15; Asts: Nina Antiola 4		Pts: Grace Irebu 28; Rebs: Grace Irebu 13; Asts: Sai Larosa 5
FEU wins series in one game

Smart Araneta Coliseum
Referees: Don Arguelles, Ruben Agbalo, Julius David

=== Finals ===
The NU Lady Bulldogs advance to the best-of-three finals by winning all 14 elimination round games. The Lady Bulldogs have not lost for 78 consecutive games, and have swept the elimination round for the past five seasons. This is a rematch of the 2014 Finals where the Lady Bulldogs won, and was the last Finals appearance of the Lady Tamaraws.

S+A

December 1
11:00 a.m.PHT

Stats

NU Lady Bulldogs	71–59	FEU Lady Tamaraws
Scoring by quarter: 22–13, 15–20, 21–5, 13–21
Pts: Jack Animam 19; Rebs: Jack Animam 12; Asts: Monique Del Carmen 6		Pts: Clare Castro 15; Rebs: Clare Castro 13; Asts: Fatima Quiapo 5

Mall of Asia Arena

December 5
11:00 a.m.PHT

Stats

NU Lady Bulldogs	67–61	FEU Lady Tamaraws
Scoring by quarter: 18–16, 23–9, 13–19, 13–17
Pts: Rhena Itesi 17; Rebs: Jack Animam 21; Asts: Monique Del Carmen 4		Pts: Fatima Quiapo 15; Rebs: Clare Castro 13; Asts: Camille Taguiam 6
NU wins series, 2–0

Smart Araneta Coliseum

- Finals Most Valuable Player: Jack Danielle Animam (NU Lady Bulldogs)

=== Awards ===
UAAP Season 81 women's basketball champions
NU Lady Bulldogs
Fifth title, fifth consecutive title

- Most Valuable Player: Grace Irebu (UST Growling Tigresses)
- Rookie of the Year: Tantoy Ferrer (UST Growling Tigresses)
- Mythical Team:
  - Grace Irebu (UST Growling Tigresses)
  - Jack Danielle Animam (NU Lady Bulldogs)
  - Misaela Larosa (UST Growling Tigresses)
  - Nathalie Prado (Adamson Lady Falcons)
  - Clare Castro (FEU Lady Tamaraws)

==== Player of the Week ====
Week ending	Player	Team
October 22	Ria Nabalan	NU Bulldogs

== Juniors' tournament ==
The juniors' tournament began on November 11, 2018 at the Blue Eagle Gym, Quezon City.

=== Elimination round ===
==== Team standings ====
Pos	Team	W	L	PCT	GB	Qualification
1	NUNS Bullpups (H)	13	1	.929	—	Twice-to-beat in the semifinals
2	Ateneo Blue Eaglets	11	3	.786	2	Twice-to-beat in the semifinals
3	FEU–D Baby Tamaraws	9	5	.643 (Note: Head-to-head record: FEU 2–0 Adamson)	4	Twice-to-win in the semifinals
4	Adamson Baby Falcons	9	5	.643	4	Twice-to-win in the semifinals
5	UST Tiger Cubs	7	7	.500	6	
6	Zobel Junior Archers	4	10	.286	9	
7	UE Junior Red Warriors	2	12	.143	11	
8	UPIS Junior Fighting Maroons	1	13	.071	12	

Updated to match(es) played on February 10, 2019. Source: ABS-CBN Sports
(H) Hosts

==== Match-up results ====
	Round 1							Round 2						
Team ╲ Game	1	2	3	4	5	6	7	8	9	10	11	12	13	14
Adamson	UP school colors	Ateneo school colors	UE school colors	FEU school colors	UST school colors	NU school colors	La Salle school colors	FEU school colors	UP school colors	NU school colors	UST school colors	La Salle school colors	UE school colors	Ateneo school colors
Ateneo	UST school colors	Adamson school colors	FEU school colors	La Salle school colors	UP school colors	UE school colors	NU school colors	NU school colors	UE school colors	FEU school colors	UP school colors	UST school colors	La Salle school colors	Adamson school colors
DLSZ	UE school colors	NU school colors	UP school colors	Ateneo school colors	FEU school colors	UST school colors	Adamson school colors	UP school colors	FEU school colors	UE school colors	NU school colors	Adamson school colors	Ateneo school colors	UST school colors
FEU–D	NU school colors	UE school colors	Ateneo school colors	Adamson school colors	La Salle school colors	UP school colors	UST school colors	Adamson school colors	La Salle school colors	Ateneo school colors	UE school colors	UP school colors	UST school colors	NU school colors
NSNU	FEU school colors	La Salle school colors	UST school colors	UP school colors	UE school colors	Adamson school colors	Ateneo school colors	Ateneo school colors	UST school colors	Adamson school colors	La Salle school colors	UE school colors	UP school colors	FEU school colors
UE	La Salle school colors	FEU school colors	Adamson school colors	UST school colors	NU school colors	Ateneo school colors	UP school colors	UST school colors	Ateneo school colors	La Salle school colors	FEU school colors	NU school colors	Adamson school colors	UP school colors
UPIS	Adamson school colors	UST school colors	La Salle school colors	NU school colors	Ateneo school colors	FEU school colors	UE school colors	La Salle school colors	Adamson school colors	UST school colors	Ateneo school colors	FEU school colors	NU school colors	UE school colors
UST	Ateneo school colors	UP school colors	NU school colors	UE school colors	Adamson school colors	La Salle school colors	FEU school colors	UE school colors	NU school colors	UP school colors	Adamson school colors	Ateneo school colors	FEU school colors	La Salle school colors

= Win; = OT win; = Loss; = OT loss

==== Scores ====
Results on top and to the right of the dashes are for first-round games; those to the bottom and to the left of it are second-round games.

Teams	AdU	AdMU	DLSZ	FEU	NSNU	UE	UPIS	UST
Adamson Baby Falcons	—	59–75	72–57	60–75	62–59	56–44	78–66	77–74
Ateneo Blue Eaglets	72–59	—	69–54	80–87*	62–78	84–62	77–60	74–61
De La Salle Junior Archers	77–94	59–88	—	67–62	49–91	66–56	55–48	55–63
FEU Baby Tamaraws	80–72	61–77	95–68	—	70–78	81–54	102–72	63–37
NSNU Bullpups	112–71	78–71	82–67	81–75	—	115–43	104–54	84–55
UE Junior Warriors	64–85	59–82	66–70	82–99	56–77	—	74–72	60–70
UPIS Junior Maroons	66–94	68–115	64–56	65–87	55–106	76–80	—	63–75
UST Tiger Cubs	67–69	78–87	85–64	86–83	66–94	85–63	80–65	—

Legend: Blue = left column team win; Red = top row team win.
Matches with lighter background shading were decided after overtime.

=== Bracket ===
Semifinals (Top 2 twice-to-beat)
1	NSNU	94
4	Adamson	72
2	Ateneo	90
3	FEU Diliman	82

Finals (Best-of-three playoff)
1	NSNU	70	64
2	Ateneo	58	53

=== Semifinals ===
==== (1) NSNU vs. (4) Adamson ====
The NSNU Bullpups have a twice-to-beat advantage.

S+A

February 15
1:00 p.m.PHT

Boxscore

NUNS Bullpups	94–72	Adamson Baby Falcons
Scoring by quarter: 30–18, 24–17, 22–21, 18–16
Pts: Terrence Fortea 30; Pts Cyril Gonzales 13; Pts Gerry Abadiano 11		Pts: Didat Hanapi 19; Pts Adam Manlapaz 12; Pts Jeremy Guarino 11
NSNU wins series in one game

Filoil Flying V Centre, San Juan
Referees: Garry Villanueva, Julius Medillo, Edmar Avis

==== (2) Ateneo vs. (3) FEU Diliman ====
The Ateneo Blue Eaglets have a twice-to-beat advantage.

S+A

February 15
3:00 p.m.PHT

Boxscore

Ateneo Blue Eaglets	90–82	FEU–D Baby Tamaraws
Scoring by quarter: 18–18, 21–11, 27–23, 24–30
Pts: Kai Sotto 22; Rebs: Kai Sotto 8 Asts: Ian Espinosa 4		Pts: RR Tolentino 19; Rebs: RR Tolentino 14; Asts: RJ Abarrientos 5
Ateneo wins series in one game

Filoil Flying V Centre, San Juan
Referees: Irewin Traballo, Emman Faraon, Ribel Cañelas

=== Finals ===
This is a best-of-three playoff.

S+A

February 18
3:00 p.m.PHT

Boxscore

NUNS Bullpups	70–58	Ateneo Blue Eaglets
Scoring by quarter: 14–11, 11–19, 28–15, 17–13
Pts: Carl Tamayo 15; Rebs: Kevin Quiambao 13; Rebs Carl Tamayo 12		Pts: Kai Sotto 16; Rebs: Kai Sotto 15; Asts: Forthsky Padrigao 8

Filoil Flying V Centre, San Juan City

S+A

February 22
3:00 p.m.PHT

Boxscore

NUNS Bullpups	64–53	Ateneo Blue Eaglets
Scoring by quarter: 18–15, 13–16, 15–14, 18–8
Pts: Terrence Fortea 15; Rebs: Carl Tamayo, Cyril Gonzales 10; Asts: Kevin Quiambao 5		Pts: Kai Sotto 26; Pts Forthsky Padrigao 8 Rebs: Kai Sotto 25
NSNU wins series, 2–0

Filoil Flying V Centre, San Juan City
Referees: Don Arguelles, Ariel Bermeo, Edgar Orpilla

- Finals Most Valuable Player: Carl Tamayo (NUNS Bullpups)

=== Awards ===
UAAP Season 81 juniors' basketball champions
NUNS Bullpups
Seventh title

- Most Valuable Player: Kai Sotto (Ateneo Blue Eaglets)
- Mythical Five:

Six players were named to the Mythical team for the first time in UAAP history.
- Kai Sotto (Ateneo Blue Eaglets)
- Mark Nonoy (UST Tiger Cubs)
- Rence Keith Sean Padrigao (Ateneo Blue Eaglets)
- John Bismarck Lina (UST Tiger Cubs)
- Rhonjhay Abarrientos (FEU–D Baby Tamaraws)
- Jose Manuel Sabandal (Adamson Baby Falcons)

== Overall Championship points ==
=== Seniors' division ===
Team	Men	Women	Total
FEU Tamaraws	8	12	20
Ateneo Blue Eagles	15	4	19
Adamson Soaring Falcons	10	8	18
NU Bulldogs	2	15	17
UST Growling Tigers	4	10	14
UP Fighting Maroons	12	1	13
De La Salle Green Archers	6	6	12
UE Red Warriors	1	2	3

Pts.	Ranking
15	Champion
12	2nd
10	3rd
8	4th
6	5th
4	6th
2	7th
1	8th
—	Did not join
WD	Withdrew

In case of a tie, the team with the higher position in any tournament is ranked higher. If both are still tied, they are listed by alphabetical order.

How rankings are determined:

- Ranks 5th to 8th determined by elimination round standings.
- Loser of the #1 vs #4 semifinal match-up is ranked 4th
  - If stepladder: Loser of stepladder semifinals round 1 is ranked 4th
- Loser of the #2 vs #3 semifinal match-up is ranked 3rd
  - If stepladder: Loser of stepladder semifinals round 2 is ranked 3rd
- Loser of the finals is ranked 2nd
- Champion is ranked 1st

== See also ==
- NCAA Season 94 basketball tournaments

Preceded by Season 80 (2017)	UAAP basketball seasons Season 81 (2018)	Succeeded by Season 82 (2019)
