= Joe Silva =

Filipino basketball coach

Blackwater Bossing
- Position: Assistant coach
- League: PBA
- Coaching career: 2004–present

Career history

Coaching
- 2004–2010: Ateneo HS (assistant)
- 2010–2018: Ateneo HS
- 2016–2017: Ateneo (assistant)
- 2018–2019: UE
- 2021: Alaska Aces (assistant)
- 2022: Converge FiberXers (assistant)
- 2023–present: Blackwater Bossing (assistant)
- 2026–present: CEU

Career highlights
- As head coach: 2× UAAP Junior's basketball champion (2014–15, 2017–18); As assistant coach: UAAP Senior's Basketball champions (2017); 5× UAAP Junior's Basketball champions (2004, 2006, 2008, 2009, 2010)

Jose Ricardo "Joe" Silva is a Filipino professional basketball coach who serves as lead assistant coach for the Blackwater Bossing of the Philippine Basketball Association (PBA).

== Career ==
=== UAAP ===
Being a former player of Ateneo Blue Eaglets for Jamike Jarin, he also served as an assistant coach to Jarin. When Jarin resigned, Silva led the Eaglets to 2 championships (2014–15 and 2017–18). He later resigned with the Eagles to be the head coach of the UE Red Warriors. But due to dismal performance, he resigned the day before the next season and replaced by Bong Tan.

=== PBA ===
In the PBA, he served as the lead assistant coach for Jeffrey Cariaso for Alaska Aces. When the Aces sold and became Converge FiberXers, he stayed with Cariaso, until the latter and whole coaching staff was replaced by Aldin Ayo.

He is now currently with the Blackwater Bossing as their lead assistant coach, reuniting with Cariaso. He became an interim coach for the PBA On Tour games.

== Coaching record ==
=== Collegiate ===
Season	Team	GP	W	L	PCT	Finish	PG	PW	PL	PPCT	Results
2018	UE	14	1	13	.071	8th	—	—	—	—	Eliminated
Totals		14	1	13	.071		—	—	—	—	0 championships
