= UAAP Season 81 =

University athletic year

- "It All Begins Here"
- Host school: National University

Overall
- Seniors: University of Santo Tomas
- Juniors: University of Santo Tomas

Seniors' champions
Sport		Men	Women
Basketball		Ateneo	NU
Volleyball		NU	Ateneo
Beach Volleyball		UST	UST
Football		Ateneo	La Salle
Baseball		La Salle	NT
Softball		NT	Adamson
Fencing		UE	Ateneo
Swimming		Ateneo	Ateneo
Badminton		NU	Ateneo
Chess		FEU	La Salle
Judo		UST	UST
Table tennis		UST	UST
Tennis		NU	NU
Track and field		UP	UST
Taekwondo		NU	NU
- Poomsae: La Salle (Coed)
- Cheerdance: NU (Ex - Coed)
- Street dance: La Salle (Ex - Coed)
- Ballroom: UP (Ex - Coed)

Juniors' champions
Sport		Boys	Girls
Basketball		NU	NT
Volleyball		NU	La Salle
Football		FEU	NT
Baseball		Ateneo	NT
Fencing		UE	UE
Swimming		La Salle	La Salle
Judo		UST	UE
Table tennis		UE	UE
Track and field		UE	UE
Taekwondo		UST	NT
- (NT) = No tournament; (DS) = Demonstration Sport; (Ex) = Exhibition;

UAAP Season 81 is the 2018–19 athletic year of the UAAP. This season is hosted by National University.

Eight member universities of the UAAP competed in the league's fifteen sports to vie for the general championship.

== Opening ceremony ==
The opening ceremony was held on September 8, 2018 at the Mall of Asia Arena with the tagline "It All Begins Here". The ceremony kicked off with an intermission number led by the NU Chorale, NU Underdawgz and the NU Pep Squad. NBA star Stephen Curry made a special appearance and led the oath of sportsmanship for the athletes. Local artists Sponge Cola, James Reid and South Korean singer-songwriter and former 2NE1 member Minzy also performed inside the arena.

The opening games were UP vs. UE in the first game and followed by NU vs. UST in the main game.

A press conference was also held at the SM Mall of Asia a few days before the opening.

== Sports calendar ==
This is the calendar of sports events of UAAP Season 81. The list includes the tournament host schools and the venues.

=== First semester ===
Sport/Division	Event host	Start date	Venue/s
Basketball (Seniors)	National University	Men - Sept.8, 2018; Women - Sept.9, 2018	Smart Araneta Coliseum, SM Mall of Asia Arena, FilOil Flying V Centre, Blue Eagle Gym, Ynares Center Antipolo
Chess (Seniors/Juniors)	University of Santo Tomas	Sept. 19, 2018	UST Quadricentennial Pavilion
Table Tennis (Men/Women/Boys)	University of the Philippines	Sept. 23, 2018	UP College of Human Kinetics Gym
Badminton (Seniors)	University of the East	Sept. 24, 2018	Rizal Memorial Badminton Hall
Beach Volleyball (Seniors)	University of Santo Tomas	Sept. 24, 2018	Sands at SM by the Bay
Volleyball (Juniors)	Far Eastern University	Oct. 13, 2018	Ateneo Blue Eagle Gym
Taekwondo (Kyorugi) (Men/Women/Boys)	Far Eastern University	Nov. 6, 2018	Ateneo Blue Eagle Gym
Taekwondo (Poomsae) (Men/Women/Boys)	Far Eastern University	Nov. 6, 2018	Ateneo Blue Eagle Gym
Swimming (Seniors/Juniors)	University of the Philippines	Nov. 7, 2018	Rizal Memorial Swimming Complex
Baseball (Boys)	Adamson University	Nov. 10, 2018	Rizal Memorial Baseball Stadium
Basketball (Boys)	Ateneo de Manila	Nov. 11, 2018	Filoil Flying V Centre; Ateneo Blue Eagle Gym
Cheerdance (Coed)	Special Events Committee	Nov. 17, 2018	Mall of Asia Arena
Fencing (Seniors/Juniors)	University of the East	Nov. 22, 2018	Victoria Sports Tower in Quezon City,
Athletics (Seniors/Juniors)	Adamson University	Nov. 28, 2018	Philsports Arena Oval Track / Vermosa Sports Hub
Football (Boys)	De La Salle University	Dec. 1, 2018	Rizal Memorial Football Stadium
Judo (Seniors/Juniors)	De La Salle University	December 8–9, 2018.	DLSU Enrique Razon Sports Center

=== Second semester ===
Sport/Division	Event host	Start date	Venue
Volleyball (Seniors)	National University	Feb. 16, 2019	Filoil Flying V Centre, SM Mall of Asia Arena; Smart Araneta Coliseum, Ynares Center Antipolo
Lawn Tennis (Seniors)	Ateneo de Manila	Feb.16, 2019	Colegio San Agustin Bulacan Tennis Stadium; San Jose del Monte City, Bulacan
Softball (Women)	Adamson University	Feb. 16, 2019	Rizal Memorial Baseball Stadium
Baseball (Men)	Adamson University	Men - Feb 17, 2019	Rizal Memorial Baseball Stadium
Football (Seniors)	De La Salle University	Men - Feb 17, 2019; Women-Mar.2,2019	Men's-Moro Lorenzo Football Field; FEU-Diliman Football Field in Quezon City; Women's-CV Pitch Circulo Verde Quezon City
Basketball 3 × 3 (Srs-demo sport)	National University	March 2–3, 2019	Ayala Malls Feliz Pasig
Ballroom Formation Dance (demo sport)	Special Events Committee	May 3, 2019	UST Quadricentennial Pavilion
Streetdance (Coed)	De La Salle University	Mar. 23, 2019	Smart Araneta Coliseum

== Basketball ==
The UAAP Season 81 Seniors' tournament basketball tournament began on September 8, 2018 at the Mall of Asia Arena. The tournament host was National University. Edmundo "Junel" Baculi and Antonio "Tonichi" Pujante were the tournament commissioner and assistant commissioner, respectively. The UAAP adopted FIBA rules on technicals, timeouts, among others. The primary playing venues were the Mall of Asia Arena and the Smart Araneta Coliseum. The Filoil Flying V Centre and the Ynares Center Antipolo served as the alternate venues when the MOA Arena and Araneta Coliseum were unavailable. the University Athletic Association of the Philippines (UAAP) (UAAP) (UAAP) tapped the services of its own exclusive group of referees in Season 81.

=== Men's tournament ===
==== Elimination round ====
Pos	Team	W	L	PCT	GB	Qualification
1	Ateneo Blue Eagles	12	2	.857	—	Twice-to-beat in the semifinals
2	Adamson Soaring Falcons	10	4	.714	2	Twice-to-beat in the semifinals
3	UP Fighting Maroons	8	6	.571 (Note: Head-to-head record: UP 3–1, FEU 2–2, La Salle 1–3; Fourth-seed playoff: FEU 71–70 La Salle)	4	Twice-to-win in the semifinals
4	FEU Tamaraws	8	6	.571	4	Twice-to-win in the semifinals
5	De La Salle Green Archers	8	6	.571	4	
6	UST Growling Tigers	5	9	.357	7	
7	NU Bulldogs (H)	4	10	.286	8	
8	UE Red Warriors	1	13	.071	11	

Source: ABS-CBN Sports
Rules for classification: 1) winning percentage; 2) if tied for #2 or #4, one-game playoff; 3) head-to-head record; 4) head-to-head point differential; 5) overall point differential
(H) Hosts

==== Playoffs ====
Semifinals (Top 2 twice-to-beat)
1	Ateneo	80
4	FEU	61
2	Adamson	71	87
3	UP	73	89*

Finals (Best-of-three playoff)
1	Ateneo	88	99
3	UP	79	81

*Overtime

==== Awards ====
- Most Valuable Player: Bright Akhuetie (UP Fighting Maroons)
- Rookie of the Year: Angelo Kouame (Ateneo Blue Eagles)

=== Women's tournament ===
==== Elimination round ====
Pos	Team	W	L	PCT	GB	Qualification
1	NU Lady Bulldogs (H)	14	0	1.000	—	Advance to the Finals (Note: As NU won all of their elimination round games, the stepladder format will be used instead of the regular Final Four format.)
2	FEU Lady Tamaraws	9	5	.643 (Note: Second-seed playoff: FEU 67–63 Adamson)	5	Twice-to-beat in stepladder round 2
3	Adamson Lady Falcons	9	5	.643	5	Proceed to stepladder round 1
4	UST Growling Tigresses	8	6	.571 (Note: Fourth-seed playoff: UST 79–67 La Salle)	6	Proceed to stepladder round 1
5	De La Salle Lady Archers	8	6	.571	6	
6	Ateneo Lady Eagles	4	10	.286 (Note: Head-to-head record: Ateneo 2–0 UE)	10	
7	UE Lady Warriors	4	10	.286	10	
8	UP Fighting Maroons	0	14	.000	14	

Source: ABS-CBN Sports
Rules for classification: 1) winning percentage; 2) if tied for #2 or #4, one-game playoff; 3) head-to-head record; 4) head-to-head point differential; 5) overall point differential
(H) Hosts

==== Playoffs ====
Stepladder round 1 (Single-elimination)
3	Adamson	69
4	UST	78

Stepladder round 2 (No. 2 twice-to-beat)
2	FEU	68
4	UST	66

Finals (Best-of-three playoff)
1	NU	71	67
2	FEU	59	61

==== Awards ====
- Most Valuable Player: Grace Irebu (UST Growling Tigresses)
- Rookie of the Year: Reynalyn Ferrer (UST Growling Tigresses)

=== Juniors' tournament ===
==== Elimination round ====
Pos	Team	W	L	PCT	GB	Qualification
1	NUNS Bullpups (H)	13	1	.929	—	Twice-to-beat in the semifinals
2	Ateneo Blue Eaglets	11	3	.786	2	Twice-to-beat in the semifinals
3	FEU–D Baby Tamaraws	9	5	.643 (Note: Head-to-head record: FEU 2–0 Adamson)	4	Twice-to-win in the semifinals
4	Adamson Baby Falcons	9	5	.643	4	Twice-to-win in the semifinals
5	UST Tiger Cubs	7	7	.500	6	
6	Zobel Junior Archers	4	10	.286	9	
7	UE Junior Red Warriors	2	12	.143	11	
8	UPIS Junior Fighting Maroons	1	13	.071	12	

Updated to match(es) played on February 10, 2019. Source: ABS-CBN Sports
(H) Hosts

==== Playoffs ====
Semifinals (Top 2 twice-to-beat)
1	NSNU	94
4	Adamson	72
2	Ateneo	90
3	FEU Diliman	82

Finals (Best-of-three playoff)
1	NSNU	70	64
2	Ateneo	58	53

==== Awards ====
- Most Valuable Player: Kai Zachary Sotto (Ateneo Blue Eaglets)
- Rookie of the Year:

== 3×3 basketball ==
The UAAP expanded its number of tournaments by holding 3×3 basketball games in the men's and women's divisions as a demonstration sport in Season 80. The inclusion of 3×3 basketball in the list of UAAP tournaments is timely as 3×3 basketball is now an Olympic event. 3×3 basketball may be reclassified as a regular sport next season after the positive responses from member schools who all fielded a team.

The UAAP Season 81 seniors' 3×3 basketball tournament was held on March 2–3, 2019. The tournament venue was the Ayala Malls Feliz, Pasig. and the tournament commissioner was Xavier Nunag.

=== Men's tournament ===
==== Team standings ====
UST Growling Tigers competed in the 3x3 tournament for the first time, while the runner-up of last seasons' tournament UE Red Warriors did not join this season's tournament.

Pos	Team	W	L	PCT	GB	Qualification	Ateneo school colors	UST school colors	UP school colors	La Salle school colors	FEU school colors	Adamson school colors	NU school colors
1	Ateneo Blue Eagles	6	0	1.000	—	Twice-to-beat in the semifinals	—	13–11	11–10	21–13	13–8	14–11	13–8
2	UST Growling Tigers	3	3	.500 (Note: Head-to-head record: UST 2–1, UP 2–1, La Salle 1–2, FEU 1–2; UST 1.107, UP 1.000, La Salle 1.147, FEU 0.795)	3	Twice-to-beat in the semifinals		—	12–8	10–9	9–11	16–14	8–9
3	UP Fighting Maroons	3	3	.500	3	Twice-to-win in the semifinals			—	15–13	13–11	13–15	13–8
4	De La Salle Green Archers	3	3	.500	3	Twice-to-win in the semifinals				—	17–9	15–13	12–10
5	FEU Tamaraws	3	3	.500	3						—	12–11	w/o (Note: Adamson and FEU won by default after NU forfeited their last two games.)
6	Adamson Soaring Falcons	2	4	.333	4							—	w/o
7	NU Bulldogs (H)	1	5	.167	5								—

Source: ABS-CBN Sports
Legend: Blue = home team win; Red = away team win.
Rules for classification: 1) winning percentage; 2) head-to-head record; 3) head-to-head goal average (quotient); 4) overall quotient
(H) Hosts

==== Playoffs ====
Semifinals (Single-elimination)
1	Ateneo	15
4	La Salle	7
2	UST	14
3	UP	11

Finals (Single-elimination)
1	Ateneo	21
2	UST	13

=== Women's tournament ===
==== Team standings ====
Pos	Team	W	L	PCT	GB	Qualification	NU school colors	UE school colors	Adamson school colors	UST school colors	Ateneo school colors	FEU school colors	La Salle school colors	UP school colors
1	NU Lady Bulldogs (H)	7	0	1.000	—	Twice-to-beat in the semifinals	—	12–7	12–2	20–10	13–10	12–3	14–8	14–9
2	UE Lady Warriors	4	3	.571 (Note: Head-to-head record: UE 2–0, Adamson 1–1, UST 0–2)	3	Twice-to-beat in the semifinals		—	3–0	7–6	10–15	8–14	8–5	9–6
3	Adamson Lady Falcons	4	3	.571	3	Twice-to-win in the semifinals			—	9–7	10–6	10–9	7–10	11–6
4	UST Growling Tigresses	4	3	.571	3	Twice-to-win in the semifinals				—	10–9	9–8	14–10	15–11
5	Ateneo Lady Eagles	3	4	.429 (Note: Head-to-head record: Ateneo 1–0 FEU)	4						—	8–6	8–11	13–6
6	FEU Lady Tamaraws	3	4	.429	4							—	12–7	13–11
7	De La Salle Lady Archers	2	5	.286	5								—	5–6
8	UP Lady Maroons	1	6	.143	6									—

Source: ABS-CBN Sports
Legend: Blue = home team win; Red = away team win.
Rules for classification: 1) winning percentage; 2) head-to-head record; 3) head-to-head goal average (quotient); 4) overall quotient
(H) Hosts

==== Playoffs ====
Semifinals (Single-elimination)
1	NU	19
4	UST	5
2	UE	12
3	Adamson	14

Finals (Single-elimination)
1	NU	21
3	Adamson	3

=== Medalists ===
Event	Gold	Silver	Bronze
Men's tournament	Ateneo	UST	UP
Women's tournament	NU	Adamson	UST

== Volleyball ==
=== Seniors' division ===
The UAAP Season 81 Seniors' tournament volleyball tournaments will begin on February 16, 2019. The tournament main venue is the Filoil Flying V Centre in San Juan City while selected games will be played at the SM Mall of Asia Arena in Pasay and Smart Araneta Coliseum in Cubao, Quezon City. The tournament host is the National University. Yul C.Benosa is the tournament commissioner.

==== Men's tournament ====
===== Elimination round =====
Pos	Team	Pld	W	L	Pts	SW	SL	SR	SPW	SPL	SPR	Qualification
1	NU Bulldogs (H)	14	13	1	38	39	6	6.500	1079	855	1.262	Twice-to-beat in the semifinals
2	FEU Tamaraws	14	11	3	32	36	16	2.250	1208	1042	1.159	Twice-to-beat in the semifinals
3	Ateneo Blue Eagles	14	10	4	33	36	16	2.250	1225	1098	1.116	Twice-to-win in the semifinals
4	Adamson Soaring Falcons	14	9	5	24	27	25	1.080	1175	1140	1.031	Twice-to-win in the semifinals
5	UST Growling Tigers	14	5	9	18 (Note: Head-to-head record: UST 1–1 La Salle; UST +5)	25	32	0.781	1231	1259	0.978	
6	De La Salle Green Archers	14	5	9	13	18	32	0.563	1068	1159	0.921	
7	UE Red Warriors	14	2	12	7	12	39	0.308	982	1210	0.812	
8	UP Fighting Maroons	14	1	13	3	14	41	0.341	1104	1309	0.843	

Source: ABS-CBN Sports
Rules for classification: 1) number of wins; 2) if tied for #2 or #4, one-game playoff; 3) match points; 4) sets ratio; 5) points ratio; 6) head-to-head record
(H) Host

===== Playoffs =====
Semifinals (Nos. 1 & 2 have twice-to-beat advantage)
1	NU	3
4	Adamson	0
2	FEU	3
3	Ateneo	1

Finals (Best-of-three series)
1	NU	3	3
2	FEU	1	1

===== Awards =====
- Finals Most Valuable Player: Bryan Bagunas (NU Bulldogs)
- Season Most Valuable Player: Bryan Bagunas (NU Bulldogs)
- Rookie of the Year: Angelo Nicolas Almendras (NU Bulldogs)

==== Women's tournament ====
===== Elimination round =====
Pos	Team	Pld	W	L	Pts	SW	SL	SR	SPW	SPL	SPR	Qualification
1	Ateneo Lady Eagles	14	12	2	34	37	14	2.643	1177	1018	1.156	Twice-to-beat in the semifinals
2	UST Growling Tigresses	14	10	4	30 (Note: Second-seed playoff: UST 3–1 La Salle)	35	17	2.059	1230	1072	1.147	Twice-to-beat in the semifinals
3	De La Salle Lady Archers	14	10	4	32	34	15	2.267	1137	973	1.169	Twice-to-win in the semifinals
4	FEU Lady Tamaraws	14	9	5	23	30	28	1.071	1240	1240	1.000	Twice-to-win in the semifinals
5	UP Lady Maroons	14	6	8	17	24	32	0.750	1228	1222	1.005	
6	NU Lady Bulldogs (H)	14	4	10	10	19	35	0.543	1112	1288	0.863	
7	UE Lady Warriors	14	3	11	13	17	35	0.486	1057	1177	0.898	
8	Adamson Lady Falcons	14	2	12	9	16	36	0.444	1043	1234	0.845	

Source: ABS-CBN Sports
Rules for classification: 1) number of wins; 2) if tied for #2 or #4, one-game playoff; 3) match points; 4) sets ratio; 5) points ratio; 6) head-to-head record
(H) Host

===== Playoffs =====
2nd-seed playoff
3	La Salle	1
4	UST	3

Semifinals; Top seeds twice-to-beat
1	Ateneo	2	3
4	FEU	3	1
2	UST	3
3	La Salle	2

Finals; Best-of-three series
1	Ateneo	0	3	3
2	UST	3	1	0

===== Awards =====
- Finals Most Valuable Player: Bea de Leon (Ateneo Lady Eagles)
- Season Most Valuable Player: Sisi Rondina (UST Growling Tigresses)
- Rookie of the Year: Ejiya Laure (UST Growling Tigresses)

=== Juniors' division ===
The UAAP Season 81 Juniors volleyball tournament started on October 13, 2018. The playing venue this season was at the Ateneo Blue Eagle Gym. This is a change from last season's playing venue at FilOil Flying V Centre in San Juan City. This is the second change in playing venue for the Juniors tournament The Adamson gym hosted the competition for three years since 2014.

Far Eastern University is the tournament host. The Juniors volleyball tournament Director is Ms. Karen Del Rosario.

The number of participating schools in the boys' and Girls' tournaments increased to eight and seven, respectively. Far Eastern University fielded boys' and girls' volleyball teams beginning season 77. Adamson fielded a boys' team starting season 79. Since there are now more than six participating schools in each tournament, both tournaments will have a Final Four format. The UAAP Board decided to move the high school volleyball tournaments from 2nd semester to 1st semester in Season 78 due to the basketball juniors tournament being moved from the 1st semester to 2nd semester.

==== Boys' tournament ====
===== Elimination round =====
Pos	Team	Pld	W	L	Pts	SW	SL	SR	SPW	SPL	SPR	Qualification
1	NUNS Bullpups	14	13	1	38	40	9	4.444	1214	903	1.344	Twice-to-beat in the semifinals
2	FEU–D Baby Tamaraws (H)	14	10	4	27 (Note: Second-seed playoff: FEU 3–2 UST)	31	20	1.550	1164	1007	1.156	Twice-to-beat in the semifinals
3	UST Tiger Cubs	14	10	4	30	34	16	2.125	1180	972	1.214	Twice-to-win in the semifinals
4	Adamson Baby Falcons	14	9	5	28	32	19	1.684	1161	1012	1.147	Twice-to-win in the semifinals
5	UE Junior Red Warriors	14	8	6	26	30	19	1.579	1072	1035	1.036	
6	Zobel Junior Archers	14	4	10	13	18	31	0.581	975	1089	0.895	
7	Ateneo Blue Eaglets	14	2	12	4	7	40	0.175	780	1135	0.687	
8	UPIS Junior Fighting Maroons	14	0	14	2	4	42	0.095	735	1128	0.652	

Source: ABS-CBN Sports
Rules for classification: 1) number of wins; 2) if tied for #2 or #4, one-game playoff; 3) match points; 4) sets ratio; 5) points ratio; 6) head-to-head record
(H) Host

===== Playoffs =====
2nd-seed playoff
3	UST	2
4	FEU	3

Semifinals; Top seeds twice-to-beat
1	NSNU	3
L1	Adamson	0
2	FEU	0	3
3	UST	3	2

Finals; Best-of-three series
1	NSNU	3	3
2	FEU	1	0

===== Awards =====
- Most Valuable Player: Jose Magdalino Javelona (FEU–D Baby Tamaraws)
- Rookie of the Year: Mac Arvin Bandola (NUNS Bullpups)

==== Girls' tournament ====
===== Elimination round =====
Pos	Team	Pld	W	L	Pts	SW	SL	SR	SPW	SPL	SPR	Qualification
1	NUNS Lady Bullpups	12	10	2	29 (Note: Head-to-head record: NSNU 1–1 DLSZ; NSNU +1)	33	12	2.750	1059	833	1.271	Twice-to-beat in the semifinals
2	Zobel Junior Lady Archers	12	10	2	28	32	13	2.462	1055	887	1.189	Twice-to-beat in the semifinals
3	UST Junior Tigresses	12	8	4	25	30	14	2.143	993	905	1.097	Twice-to-win in the semifinals
4	Adamson Lady Baby Falcons	12	7	5	20	25	21	1.190	995	963	1.033	Twice-to-win in the semifinals
5	FEU–D Lady Baby Tamaraws (H)	12	5	7	18	22	22	1.000	976	947	1.031	
6	UE Junior Lady Warriors	12	2	10	6	6	31	0.194	675	892	0.757	
7	UPIS Junior Lady Maroons	12	0	12	0	1	36	0.028	602	928	0.649	

Source: ABS-CBN Sports
Rules for classification: 1) number of wins; 2) if tied for #2 or #4, one-game playoff; 3) match points; 4) sets ratio; 5) points ratio; 6) head-to-head record
(H) Host

===== Playoffs =====
Semifinals (Nos. 1 & 2 have twice-to-beat advantage)
1	NSNU	3
4	Adamson	0
2	DLSZ	3
3	UST	0

Finals (Best-of-three series)
1	NSNU	2	2
2	DLSZ	3	3

===== Awards =====
- Finals Most Valuable Player: Justine Jazareno (Zobel Junior Lady Archers)
- Season Most Valuable Player: Angel Anne Canino (Zobel Junior Lady Archers)
- Rookie of the Year:

== Beach volleyball ==
The UAAP Season 81 beach volleyball tournament began on September 24, 2018. The tournament venue is at the Sands SM by the Bay, SM Mall of Asia in Pasay, Metro Manila. University of Santo Tomas is the tournament host. Beach volleyball is a single round-robin elimination tournament. The tournament concluded on October 7, 2018.

=== Men's tournament ===
==== Elimination round ====
===== Team standings =====
Pos	Team	Pld	W	L	PCT	GB	Qualification
1	FEU Tamaraws	7	7	0	1.000	—	Advance to the Finals
2	UST Growling Tigers (H)	7	6	1	.857	1	Twice-to-beat in stepladder round 2
3	NU Bulldogs	7	5	2	.714	2	Qualified to stepladder round 1
4	Adamson Soaring Falcons	7	4	3	.571	3	Qualified to stepladder round 1
5	UE Red Warriors	7	2	5	.286	5	
6	UP Fighting Maroons	7	2	5	.286	5	
7	Ateneo Blue Eagles	7	2	5	.286	5	
8	De La Salle Green Archers	7	0	7	.000	7	

Rules for classification: 1) winning percentage; 2) if tied for #2 or #4, one-game playoff; 3) head-to-head record; 4) head-to-head point differential; 5) overall point differential
(H) Hosts

===== Match-up results =====
Team ╲ Game	1	2	3	4	5	6	7
AdMU	UST school colors	UE school colors	NU school colors	Adamson school colors	La Salle school colors	UP school colors	FEU school colors
AdU	UP school colors	NU school colors	UE school colors	Ateneo school colors	FEU school colors	UST school colors	La Salle school colors
DLSU	UE school colors	UST school colors	UP school colors	NU school colors	Ateneo school colors	FEU school colors	Adamson school colors
FEU	NU school colors	UP school colors	UST school colors	UE school colors	Adamson school colors	La Salle school colors	Ateneo school colors
NU	FEU school colors	Adamson school colors	Ateneo school colors	La Salle school colors	UP school colors	UE school colors	UST school colors
UE	La Salle school colors	Ateneo school colors	Adamson school colors	FEU school colors	UST school colors	NU school colors	UP school colors
UP	Adamson school colors	FEU school colors	La Salle school colors	UST school colors	NU school colors	Ateneo school colors	UE school colors
UST	Ateneo school colors	La Salle school colors	FEU school colors	UP school colors	UE school colors	Adamson school colors	NU school colors

= Win; = Loss

==== Playoffs ====
Stepladder round 1 (One-game playoff)
3	NU	2
4	Adamson	0

Stepladder round 2 (No. 2 has twice-to-beat advantage)
2	UST	2
3	NU	0

Finals (Best-of-three series)
1	FEU	0	1
2	UST	2	2

==== Awards ====
- Most Valuable Player: Anthony Arbasto (UST Growling Tigers)
- Rookie of the Year: Jaron Requinton (UST Growling Tigers)

=== Women's tournament ===
==== Elimination round ====
===== Team standings =====
Pos	Team	Pld	W	L	PCT	GB	Qualification
1	UST Growling Tigresses (H)	7	7	0	1.000	—	Advance to the Finals
2	De La Salle Lady Archers	7	6	1	.857	1	Twice-to-beat in stepladder round 2
3	NU Lady Bulldogs	7	5	2	.714	2	Qualified to stepladder round 1
4	UP Lady Maroons	7	3	4	.429 (Note: Fourth-seed playoff: UP 2–0 Ateneo)	4	Qualified to stepladder round 1
5	Ateneo Lady Eagles	7	3	4	.429	4	
6	Adamson Lady Falcons	7	2	5	.286 (Note: Head-to-head record: Adamson 1–0)	5	
7	FEU Lady Tamaraws	7	2	5	.286	5	
8	UE Lady Warriors	7	0	7	.000	7	

Rules for classification: 1) winning percentage; 2) if tied for #2 or #4, one-game playoff; 3) head-to-head record; 4) head-to-head point differential; 5) overall point differential
(H) Hosts

===== Match-up results =====
Team ╲ Game	1	2	3	4	5	6	7
AdMU	NU school colors	UST school colors	Adamson school colors	La Salle school colors	UP school colors	FEU school colors	UE school colors
AdU	UE school colors	La Salle school colors	Ateneo school colors	UP school colors	FEU school colors	UST school colors	NU school colors
DLSU	FEU school colors	Adamson school colors	UST school colors	Ateneo school colors	UE school colors	NU school colors	UP school colors
FEU	La Salle school colors	UE school colors	UP school colors	NU school colors	Adamson school colors	Ateneo school colors	UST school colors
NU	Ateneo school colors	UP school colors	UE school colors	FEU school colors	UST school colors	La Salle school colors	Adamson school colors
UE	Adamson school colors	FEU school colors	NU school colors	UST school colors	La Salle school colors	UP school colors	Ateneo school colors
UP	UST school colors	NU school colors	FEU school colors	Adamson school colors	Ateneo school colors	UE school colors	La Salle school colors
UST	UP school colors	Ateneo school colors	La Salle school colors	UE school colors	NU school colors	Adamson school colors	FEU school colors

= Win; = Loss

==== Playoffs ====
4th–seed playoff (One–game playoff)
4	Ateneo	0
5	UP	2

First round (One–game playoff)
3	NU	1
4	UP	2

Semifinals (No. 2 seed has twice-to-beat advantage)
2	La Salle	2
4	UP	1

Finals (Best-of-three series)
1	UST	2	2
2	La Salle	0	0

==== Awards ====
- Most Valuable Player: Sisi Rondina (UST Growling Tigresses)
- Rookie of the Year: Babylove Barbon (UST Growling Tigresses)

== Football ==
The UAAP Season 81 football tournaments started on December 1, 2018 for the Juniors' tournament and on February 17, 2019 for the Seniors' tournament. The venue for the Juniors' tournament was at the Rizal Memorial Football Stadium while the Men's tournament was played at the Moro Lorenzo Football Field and the FEU-Diliman Football Field. The Women's tournament was played at the CV Pitch Circulo Verde Quezon City. The tournament host was De La Salle University.

=== Men's tournament ===
==== Elimination round ====
===== Team standings =====
Pos	Team	Pld	W	D	L	GF	GA	GD	Pts	Qualification
1	Ateneo Blue Eagles	14	8	2	4	37	12	+25	26	Qualified to the semifinals
2	UP Fighting Maroons	14	8	2	4	24	17	+7	26	Qualified to the semifinals
3	De La Salle Green Archers (H)	14	8	1	5	21	17	+4	25	Qualified to the semifinals
4	FEU Tamaraws	14	7	3	4	22	18	+4	24	Qualified to the semifinals
5	UST Growling Tigers	14	6	5	3	21	21	0	23	
6	Adamson Soaring Falcons	14	2	6	6	13	27	−14	12	
7	NU Bulldogs	14	2	4	8	14	27	−13	10	
8	UE Red Warriors	14	2	3	9	8	21	−13	9	

(H) Hosts

===== Match-up results =====
	Round 1							Round 2						
Team ╲ Game	1	2	3	4	5	6	7	8	9	10	11	12	13	14
AdU	UP school colors	UST school colors	La Salle school colors	UE school colors	Ateneo school colors	FEU school colors	UP school colors	NU school colors	UP school colors	Ateneo school colors	La Salle school colors	FEU school colors	UST school colors	UE school colors
AdMU	UE school colors	FEU school colors	UP school colors	UST school colors	Adamson school colors	NU school colors	La Salle school colors	FEU school colors	Adamson school colors	La Salle school colors	NU school colors	UP school colors	UST school colors	UE school colors
DLSU	UST school colors	Adamson school colors	UE school colors	NU school colors	UP school colors	FEU school colors	Ateneo school colors	UST school colors	UP school colors	Ateneo school colors	Adamson school colors	UE school colors	NU school colors	FEU school colors
FEU	UE school colors	Ateneo school colors	UST school colors	NU school colors	UP school colors	Adamson school colors	La Salle school colors	Ateneo school colors	UST school colors	NU school colors	Adamson school colors	UE school colors	UP school colors	La Salle school colors
NU	Adamson school colors	UST school colors	UP school colors	La Salle school colors	FEU school colors	UE school colors	Ateneo school colors	Adamson school colors	UE school colors	FEU school colors	Ateneo school colors	UP school colors	La Salle school colors	UST school colors
UE	FEU school colors	Ateneo school colors	La Salle school colors	Adamson school colors	UST school colors	NU school colors	UP school colors	NU school colors	UST school colors	La Salle school colors	FEU school colors	Adamson school colors	Ateneo school colors	UP school colors
UP	NU school colors	Ateneo school colors	La Salle school colors	FEU school colors	UST school colors	UE school colors	Adamson school colors	Adamson school colors	La Salle school colors	UST school colors	NU school colors	Ateneo school colors	FEU school colors	UE school colors
UST	La Salle school colors	Adamson school colors	NU school colors	FEU school colors	Ateneo school colors	UE school colors	UP school colors	La Salle school colors	FEU school colors	UE school colors	UP school colors	Adamson school colors	Ateneo school colors	NU school colors

= Win; = Draw; = Loss

===== Results =====
Results on top and to the right of the dashes are for first-round games; those to the bottom and to the left of it are second-round games.

Teams	AdU	AdMU	DLSU	FEU	NU	UE	UP	UST
Adamson	—	0–4	0–1	1–1	1–1	1–1	2–1	1–1
Ateneo	7–1	—	1–2	1–1	4–0	0–1	1–2	5–0
De La Salle	4–2	1–3	—	1–2	2–0	0–1	2–1	1–3
FEU	3–1	1–4	0–1	—	2–1	4–1	2–1	2–2
NU	1–1	0–2	1–3	1–2	—	2–0	3–0	2–2
UE	1–1	0–3	0–2	0–1	0–0	—	1–2	2–3
UP	2–1	1–1	2–0	2–1	4–1	3–0	—	1–1
UST	0–1	2–1	2–2	1–0	2–1	2–1	1–2	—

Updated to match(es) played on May 2, 2019. Source:
Legend: Blue = left column team win; Yellow = draw; Red = top row team win.

==== Playoffs ====
Semifinals
1	Ateneo	1
4	FEU	0
2	UP	1
3	La Salle	2

Finals
1	Ateneo	2
3	La Salle	1

==== Awards ====
- Most Valuable Player: Javier Augustine Gayoso (Ateneo Blue Eagles)
- Rookie of the Year: Shanden Vergara (De La Salle Green Archers)
- Best Striker: Javier Augustine Gayoso (Ateneo Blue Eagles)
- Best Goalkeeper: Alexandre Jae Arcilla (Ateneo Blue Eagles)
- Best Midfielder: Darius Joseph Diamante (De La Salle Green Archers)
- Best Defender: Yoshiharu Koizumi (De La Salle Green Archers)
- Fair Play Award: UST Growling Tigers

=== Women's tournament ===
==== Elimination round ====
===== Team standings =====
Pos	Team	Pld	W	D	L	GF	GA	GD	Pts	Qualification
1	De La Salle Lady Archers (H)	2	1	1	0	5	2	+3	4	Qualified to the Finals
2	FEU Lady Tamaraws	3	2	0	1	4	2	+2	6	Qualified to the Finals
3	UST Growling Tigresses	4	1	1	2	4	7	−3	4	
4	UP Lady Maroons	3	2	0	1	4	2	+2	6	
5	Ateneo Lady Eagles	2	0	0	2	0	6	−6	0	

(H) Hosts

===== Match-up results =====
	Round 1				Round 2			
Team ╲ Game	1	2	3	4	5	6	7	8
AdMU	FEU school colors	La Salle school colors	UST school colors	UP school colors	UST school colors	FEU school colors	La Salle school colors	UP school colors
DLSU	Ateneo school colors	UST school colors	UP school colors	FEU school colors	UST school colors	UP school colors	Ateneo school colors	FEU school colors
FEU	Ateneo school colors	UST school colors	UP school colors	La Salle school colors	UP school colors	Ateneo school colors	UST school colors	La Salle school colors
UP	UST school colors	FEU school colors	La Salle school colors	Ateneo school colors	FEU school colors	La Salle school colors	UST school colors	Ateneo school colors
UST	UP school colors	FEU school colors	Ateneo school colors	La Salle school colors	Ateneo school colors	La Salle school colors	UP school colors	FEU school colors

= Win; = Draw; = Loss

===== Results =====
Results on top and to the right of the dashes are for first-round games; those to the bottom and to the left of it are second-round games.

Teams	AdMU	DLSU	FEU	UP	UST
Ateneo	—	0–3	0–3	1–0	1–2
De La Salle	4–2	—			2–2
FEU	1–1	1–1	—	0–2	1–0
UP	1–1		0–0	—	1–2
UST	1–1	0–0		0–1	—

Updated to match(es) played on February 18, 2019. Source:
Legend: Blue = left column team win; Yellow = draw; Red = top row team win.

==== Finals ====
Finals
1	La Salle	2
2	FEU	0

==== Awards ====
- Most Valuable Player: Sara Castaneda (De La Salle Lady Archers)
- Rookie of the Year: Alisha Del Campo (De La Salle Lady Archers)
- Best Striker: Alisha Del Campo (De La Salle Lady Archers)
- Best Midfielder: Sara Castaneda (De La Salle Lady Archers)
- Best Goalkeeper: Natasha Lacson (De La Salle Lady Archers)
- Best Defender: Hannah Pachejo (FEU Lady Tamaraws)
- Fair Play Award: De La Salle Lady Archers

=== Boys' tournament ===
The UAAP Season 81 juniors' football tournament started on November 18, 2018. The playing venue was at the Rizal Memorial Football Stadium. La Salle is the tournament host.

==== Elimination round ====
===== Team standings =====
Pos	Team	Pld	W	D	L	GF	GA	GD	Pts	Qualification
1	FEU–D Baby Tamaraws	8	5	2	1	29	6	+23	17	Finals
2	NUNS Bullpups	8	4	4	0	6	2	+4	16	Finals
3	Ateneo Blue Eaglets	8	4	2	2	0	0	0	14	
4	UST Tiger Cubs	8	1	2	5	6	16	−10	5	
5	Zobel Junior Archers (H)	8	1	0	7	4	26	−22	3	

(H) Hosts

===== Match-up results =====
	Round 1				Round 2			
Team ╲ Game	1	2	3	4	5	6	7	8
AdMU	La Salle school colors	UST school colors	NU school colors	FEU school colors	UST school colors	NU school colors	La Salle school colors	FEU school colors
DLSU	Ateneo school colors	FEU school colors	UST school colors	NU school colors	NU school colors	Ateneo school colors	FEU school colors	UST school colors
FEU	NU school colors	La Salle school colors	Ateneo school colors	UST school colors	UST school colors	NU school colors	La Salle school colors	Ateneo school colors
NU	UST school colors	FEU school colors	Ateneo school colors	La Salle school colors	La Salle school colors	Ateneo school colors	FEU school colors	UST school colors
UST	NU school colors	Ateneo school colors	La Salle school colors	FEU school colors	Ateneo school colors	FEU school colors	NU school colors	La Salle school colors

= Win; = Draw; = Loss

===== Results =====
Results on top and to the right of the dashes are for first-round games; those to the bottom and to the left of it are second-round games.

Teams	AdMU	DLSU	FEU	NU	UST
Ateneo	—	1–0	0–4	0–0	4–1
La Salle	1–7	—	0–5	0–2	0–1
FEU	3–4	9–0	—	0–0	2–1
NU	2–1	1–0	0–0	—	1–0
UST	1–1	1–2	1–6	0–0	—

Legend: Blue = left column team win; Yellow = draw; Red = top row team win.

==== Finals ====
Team 1	Score	Team 2
FEU–D Baby Tamaraws	1 vs 0	NUNS Bullpups

==== Awards ====
- Most Valuable Player: Macky Tobias (FEU–D Baby Tamaraws)
- Rookie of the Year:
- Best Striker:
- Best Midfielder:
- Best Defender:
- Best Goalkeeper:
- Fair Play Award:

== Baseball ==
The UAAP Season 81 Men's division baseball tournament will begin on February 17, 2019 at the Rizal Memorial Baseball Stadium in Malate, Manila. The tournament host is Adamson.

=== Men's tournament ===
==== Elimination round ====
===== Team standings =====
Pos	Team	Pld	W	L	PCT	GB	Qualification
1	De La Salle Green Archers	10	8	2	.800	—	Qualified to the Finals
2	Ateneo Blue Eagles	10	7	3	.700	1	Qualified to the Finals
3	UST Growling Tigers	10	4	6	.400	4	
4	Adamson Soaring Falcons (H)	10	5	5	.500	3	
5	NU Bulldogs	10	4	6	.400	4	
6	UP Fighting Maroons	10	2	8	.200	6	

Source: ABS-CBN Sports
Rules for classification: 1) winning percentage; 2) if tied for #2 or #4, one-game playoff; 3) head-to-head record; 4) head-to-head point differential; 5) overall point differential
(H) Hosts

===== Match-up results =====
	Round 1					Round 2				
Team ╲ Game	1	2	3	4	5	6	7	8	9	10
AdU	NU school colors	UST school colors	UP school colors	Ateneo school colors	La Salle school colors	La Salle school colors	Ateneo school colors	UP school colors	UST school colors	
AdMU	UST school colors	UP school colors	La Salle school colors	Adamson school colors	NU school colors	UP school colors	Adamson school colors	NU school colors	La Salle school colors	UST school colors
DLSU	UP school colors	NU school colors	Ateneo school colors	UST school colors	Adamson school colors	Adamson school colors	NU school colors	UST school colors	Ateneo school colors	
NU	Adamson school colors	La Salle school colors	UST school colors	UP school colors	Ateneo school colors	UST school colors	La Salle school colors	Ateneo school colors	UP school colors	
UP	La Salle school colors	Ateneo school colors	Adamson school colors	NU school colors	UST school colors	Ateneo school colors	UST school colors	Adamson school colors	NU school colors	
UST	Ateneo school colors	Adamson school colors	NU school colors	La Salle school colors	UP school colors	NU school colors	UP school colors	La Salle school colors	Adamson school colors	Ateneo school colors

= Win; = Loss

===== Results =====
Results on top and to the right of the dashes are for first-round games; those to the bottom and to the left of it are second-round games.

Teams	AdU	AdMU	DLSU	NU	UP	UST
Adamson	—	9–6	2–10	2–1	4–1	7–10
Ateneo		—	13–11	7–1	16–5	14–3
La Salle	6–5	16–5	—		12–2	3–10
NU		6–1		—	2–1	2–16
UP	4–6	6–23			—	7–1
UST		10–11	5–21	9–4		—

Updated to match(es) played on February 26, 2019. Source:
Legend: Blue = left column team win; Red = top row team win.

==== Finals ====
Team 1	Score	Team 2
Ateneo Blue Eagles	7–9	De La Salle Green Archers
Ateneo Blue Eagles	7–3	De La Salle Green Archers
Ateneo Blue Eagles	9–11	De La Salle Green Archers

==== Awards ====
- Season Most Valuable Player: Diego Lozano (De La Salle Green Archers)
- Finals Most Valuable Player: Kiko Gesmundo (De La Salle Green Archers)
- Rookie of the Year: Mark John Philip Beronilla (UST Growling Tigers)
- Best Pitcher: Mar Joseph Carolino (NU Bulldogs)
- Best Hitter: Boo Barandiaran (De La Salle Green Archers)
- Best Slugger: Diego Lozano (De La Salle Green Archers)
- Most Runs Batted-In: Iggy Escaño (De La Salle Green Archers)
- Most Home-runs: Diego Lozano (De La Salle Green Archers)
- Most Stolen Bases: Erwin Bosito (Adamson Soaring Falcons)

=== Boys' tournament ===
The UAAP Season 80 Boys' division baseball tournament began on January 20, 2018 at the Rizal Memorial Baseball Stadium in Malate Manila. NU fielded a boys' baseball team starting with Season 80. This brought the number of participating teams to four. Since there are now four teams participating, baseball will no longer be a demonstration sport in the Boys' Juniors' tournament. It will be a regular sport with the participating schools earning points for the Juniors General Championship. The tournament host is Adamson.

==== Elimination round ====
===== Team standings =====
Pos	Team	Pld	W	L	PCT	GB	Qualification
1	Ateneo Blue Eaglets	6	4	2	.667	—	Qualified to the Finals
2	NUNS Bullpups	2	2	0	1.000	—	Qualified to the Finals
3	UST Tiger Cubs	3	1	2	.333	1.5	
4	Zobel Junior Archers	2	0	2	.000	2	

Source: ABS-CBN Sports
Rules for classification: 1) winning percentage; 2) if tied for #2 or #4, one-game playoff; 3) head-to-head record; 4) head-to-head point differential; 5) overall point differential

===== Match-up results =====
	Round 1			Round 2		
Team ╲ Game	1	2	3	4	5	6
AdMU	NU school colors	La Salle school colors	UST school colors	La Salle school colors	UST school colors	NU school colors
DLSZ	UST school colors	Ateneo school colors	NU school colors	Ateneo school colors		
NU	Ateneo school colors	UST school colors	La Salle school colors			Ateneo school colors
UST	La Salle school colors	NU school colors	Ateneo school colors		Ateneo school colors	

= Win; = Loss

===== Scores =====
Results on top and to the right of the dashes are for first-round games; those to the bottom and to the left of it are second-round games.

Teams	AdMU	DLSU	NU	UST
Ateneo	—	12–11	2–12	6–1
De La Salle	3–12	—		
NU	9–2		—	
UST	3–4			—

Updated to match(es) played on February 18, 2019. Source:
Legend: Blue = left column team win; Red = top row team win.

==== Finals ====
Team 1	Score	Team 2
Ateneo Blue Eaglets	6–3	NUNS Bullpups
Ateneo Blue Eaglets	2-0	NUNS Bullpups

==== Awards ====
- Season Most Valuable Player: Kiel Olazo (NUNS Bullpups)
- Finals Most Valuable Player: Zach Urbina (Ateneo Blue Eaglets)
- Rookie of the Year:
- Best Pitcher:
- Best Hitter: Kiel Olazo (NUNS Bullpups)
- Best Slugger: Kiel Olazo (NUNS Bullpups)
- Most Runs Batted-In: Matthew San Juan (Ateneo Blue Eaglets)
- Most Home-runs: Dax Fabella (Ateneo Blue Eaglets) and Rezel Esqulit (NUNS Bullpups)
- Most Stolen Bases: Marcel Guzman (Ateneo Blue Eaglets)

== Softball ==
The UAAP Season 81 softball tournament will begin on February 16, 2019 at the Rizal Memorial Baseball Stadium in Malate Manila. The tournament host is Adamson. Softball is a sport for women only in the UAAP.

=== Women's tournament ===
==== Elimination round ====
===== Team standings =====
Pos	Team	Pld	W	L	PCT	GB	Qualification
1	Adamson Lady Falcons (H)	12	11	1	.917	—	Twice-to-beat in the semifinals
2	De La Salle Lady Archers	12	8	4	.667	3	Twice-to-beat in the semifinals
3	UST Growling Tigresses	12	7	5	.583	4	Twice-to-win in the semifinals
4	NU Lady Bulldogs	12	6	6	.500	5	Twice-to-win in the semifinals
5	UP Lady Maroons	12	6	6	.500	5	
6	UE Lady Warriors	12	3	9	.250	8	
7	Ateneo Lady Eagles	12	1	11	.083	10	

Source: ABS-CBN Sports
Rules for classification: 1) winning percentage; 2) if tied for #2 or #4, one-game playoff; 3) head-to-head record; 4) head-to-head point differential; 5) overall point differential
(H) Hosts

===== Match-up results =====
	Round 1						Round 2					
Team ╲ Game	1	2	3	4	5	6	7	8	9	10	11	12
AdU	*		*	*	*			UST school colors		Ateneo school colors		NU school colors
AdMU	*	*	*	*	*	*	NU school colors	UE school colors	La Salle school colors	Adamson school colors	UST school colors	UP school colors
DLSU	*	*	*	*	*		UST school colors		Ateneo school colors			UST school colors
NU	*	*	*	*	*	UE school colors	Ateneo school colors				UST school colors	Adamson school colors
UE	*	*	*	*	*	NU school colors	UST school colors	Ateneo school colors				
UP	*	*	*		UST school colors	*			UST school colors			Ateneo school colors
UST	*	*	*	*	UP school colors	*	UE school colors	Adamson school colors	UP school colors	Ateneo school colors	NU school colors	La Salle school colors

= Win; = Loss

===== Results =====
Results on top and to the right of the dashes are for first-round games; those to the bottom and to the left of it are second-round games.

Teams	AdU	AdMU	DLSU	NU	UE	UP	UST
Adamson	—	10–0		6–0	14–1	0–3	14–0
Ateneo	0–15	—	0–3	2–9	4–5	0–6	0–5
De La Salle			—	4–5	5–3	4–2	0–7
NU	1–2	7–0	5–6	—	3–6	2–4	9–6
UE	3–5	0–1			—	1–9	3–2
UP		5–1		1–8		—	11–12
UST		7–0	0–7			12–11	—

Updated to match(es) played on February 18, 2019. Source:
Legend: Blue = left column team win; Red = top row team win.

==== Playoffs ====
Semifinals (Nos. 1 & 2 have twice-to-beat advantage)
1	Adamson	2
NSNU	1
2	La Salle	6	2
UST	12	9

Finals (Best-of-three series)
1	Adamson	12	11
3	UST	2	2

==== Awards ====
- Season Most Valuable Player: Arianne Vallestero (Adamson Lady Falcons)
- Finals Most Valuable Player: Lyca Basa (Adamson Lady Falcons)
- Rookie of the Year: Charlotte Sales (UST Growling Tigresses)
- Best Pitcher: Arianne Vallestero (Adamson Lady Falcons)
- Best Slugger: Arianne Vallestero (Adamson Lady Falcons)
- Best Hitter: Arianne Vallestero (Adamson Lady Falcons)
- Most Runs Batted-In: Arianne Vallestero (Adamson Lady Falcons)
- Most Stolen Bases:
  - Arianne Vallestero (Adamson Lady Falcons)
  - Angelu Gabriel (Adamson Lady Falcons)
- Most Home-runs:
  - Arianne Vallestero (Adamson Lady Falcons)
  - Charlotte Sales (UST Growling Tigresses)

== Badminton ==
The UAAP Season 81 badminton tournament began on September 24, 2018. The tournament venue is the Rizal Memorial Badminton Hall in Vito Cruz St., Malate, Manila. Badminton is a single round-robin elimination tournament. University of the East is the tournament host.

=== Men's tournament ===
==== Elimination round ====
Team standings

Pos	Team	Pld	W	L	PCT	GB	Qualification
1	NU Bulldogs	6	6	0	1.000	—	Advance to the Finals
2	UP Fighting Maroons	6	5	1	.833	1	Twice-to-beat in stepladder round 2
3	Ateneo Blue Eagles	6	4	2	.667 (Note: Head-to-head record: Ateneo 1–0 La Salle)	2	Qualified to stepladder round 1
4	De La Salle Green Archers	6	4	2	.667	2	Qualified to stepladder round 1
5	Adamson Soaring Falcons	6	2	4	.333	4	
6	UST Growling Tigers	6	1	5	.167	5	
7	UE Red Warriors (H)	6	0	6	.000	6	

Source: ABS-CBN Sports
Rules for classification: 1) winning percentage; 2) if tied for #2 or #4, one-game playoff; 3) head-to-head record; 4) head-to-head point differential; 5) overall point differential
(H) Hosts
Notes:

Match-up results

Team ╲ Game	1	2	3	4	5	6
Ateneo	UE school colors	NU school colors	La Salle school colors	Adamson school colors	UP school colors	UST school colors
AdU	UP school colors	NU school colors	La Salle school colors	Ateneo school colors	UST school colors	UE school colors
DLSU	UST school colors	Adamson school colors	Ateneo school colors	NU school colors	UE school colors	UP school colors
NU	Adamson school colors	Ateneo school colors	UP school colors	UST school colors	La Salle school colors	UE school colors
UE	Ateneo school colors	UP school colors	NU school colors	UST school colors	La Salle school colors	Adamson school colors
UP	Adamson school colors	UE school colors	NU school colors	UST school colors	Ateneo school colors	La Salle school colors
UST	La Salle school colors	Adamson school colors	UP school colors	UE school colors	NU school colors	Ateneo school colors

= Win; = Loss

==== Playoffs ====
Stepladder round 1 (Single-elimination)
3	Ateneo	3
4	La Salle	1

Stepladder round 2 (No. 2 has twice-to-beat advantage)
2	UP	3
3	Ateneo	2

Finals (Best-of-three series)
1	NU	3	3
2	UP	2	0

==== Awards ====
- Most Valuable Player:
- Rookie of the Year:

=== Women's tournament ===
==== Elimination round ====
Team standings

Pos	Team	Pld	W	L	PCT	GB	Qualification
1	UP Lady Maroons	6	5	1	.833	—	Twice-to-beat in the semifinals
2	NU Lady Bulldogs	6	5	1	.833	—	Twice-to-beat in the semifinals
3	Ateneo Lady Eagles	6	4	2	.667 (Note: Head-to-head record: Ateneo 1–0 La Salle)	1	Twice-to-win in the semifinals
4	De La Salle Lady Archers	6	4	2	.667	1	Twice-to-win in the semifinals
5	Adamson Lady Falcons	6	2	4	.333	3	
6	UST Growling Tigresses	6	1	5	.167	4	
7	UE Lady Warriors (H)	6	0	6	.000	5	

Source: ABS-CBN Sports
Rules for classification: 1) winning percentage; 2) if tied for #2 or #4, one-game playoff; 3) head-to-head record; 4) head-to-head point differential; 5) overall point differential
(H) Hosts
Notes:

Match-up results

Team ╲ Game	1	2	3	4	5	6
AdMU	UE school colors	La Salle school colors	Adamson school colors	UST school colors	UP school colors	NU school colors
AdU	NU school colors	UE school colors	Ateneo school colors	UP school colors	La Salle school colors	UST school colors
DLSU	Ateneo school colors	UST school colors	UP school colors	NU school colors	Adamson school colors	UE school colors
NU	Adamson school colors	UP school colors	UST school colors	UE school colors	La Salle school colors	Ateneo school colors
UE	Ateneo school colors	Adamson school colors	UST school colors	UP school colors	NU school colors	La Salle school colors
UP	UST school colors	NU school colors	UE school colors	La Salle school colors	Adamson school colors	Ateneo school colors
UST	UP school colors	NU school colors	UE school colors	La Salle school colors	Ateneo school colors	Adamson school colors

= Win; = Loss

==== Playoffs ====
Semifinals (Nos. 1 & 2 have twice-to-beat advantage)
UP	3
La Salle	1
NU	1	2
Ateneo	3	3

Finals (Best-of-three series)
1	UP	2	0
3	Ateneo	3	3

==== Awards ====
- Co-Most Valuable Players: Chanelle Lunod and Joella Geva de Vera (Ateneo Lady Eagles)
- Rookie of the Year: Sarah Joy Barredo (NU Lady Bulldogs)

== Judo ==
The UAAP Season 81 Judo Championships will be held from November 2018 at the De La Salle Zobel Sports Pavilion in Ayala Alabang, Muntinlupa. The tournament host is De La Salle University.

=== Men's tournament ===
==== Team standings ====
Rank	Team	Medals				Points
Rank	Team	1st place, gold medalist(s)	2nd place, silver medalist(s)	3rd place, bronze medalist(s)	**Total**	Points
Champions	Ateneo					
Runners-up	UST					
Third-placers	**La Salle**					
4	UP					
5	UE					
6	Adamson					

Event host in **boldface**

==== Awards ====
- Most Valuable Player:
- Rookie of the Year:

=== Women's tournament ===
==== Team standings ====
Rank	Team	Medals				Points
Rank	Team	1st place, gold medalist(s)	2nd place, silver medalist(s)	3rd place, bronze medalist(s)	**Total**	Points
1st place, gold medalist(s)	UST					
2nd place, silver medalist(s)	UE					
3rd place, bronze medalist(s)	UP					
4	**La Salle**					
5	Ateneo					

Event host in **boldface**

==== Awards ====
- Most Valuable Player:
- Rookie of the Year:

Medal	Pts.
1st	10
2nd	5
3rd	2

=== Boys' tournament ===
==== Team standings ====
Rank	Team	Medals				Points
Rank	Team	1st place, gold medalist(s)	2nd place, silver medalist(s)	3rd place, bronze medalist(s)	**Total**	Points
1st place, gold medalist(s)	Ateneo					
2nd place, silver medalist(s)	UST					
3rd place, bronze medalist(s)	**La Salle**					
4	FEU					
5	UE					
6	UP					

Event host in **boldface**

==== Awards ====
- Most Valuable Player:
- Rookie of the Year:

=== Girls' tournament (demonstration event) ===
==== Team standings ====
Rank	Team	Medals				Points
Rank	Team	1st place, gold medalist(s)	2nd place, silver medalist(s)	3rd place, bronze medalist(s)	**Total**	Points
1st place, gold medalist(s)	UST					
2nd place, silver medalist(s)	FEU					
3rd place, bronze medalist(s)	**La Salle**					
4	UE					

Event host in **boldface**

==== Awards ====
- Most Valuable Player:
- Rookie of the Year:

== Swimming ==
The UAAP Season 81 Swimming Championships was held from November 11–15, 2018 at the Rizal Memorial Swimming Pool in Vito Cruz St., Malate, Manila. The tournament host is University of the Philippines and tournament commissioner is __________ . The number of participating teams in the Girls' tournament increased by one school with the participation of Ateneo. There are now six schools participating.

Team ranking is determined by a point system, similar to that of the overall championship. The points given are based on the swimmer's/team's finish in the finals of an event, which include only the top eight finishers from the preliminaries. The gold medalist(s) receive 15 points, silver gets 12, bronze has 10. The following points: 8, 6, 4, 2 and 1 are given to the rest of the participating swimmers/teams according to their order of finish.

=== Men's tournament ===
==== Team standings ====
Rank	Team	Medals				Rec	Points
Rank	Team	1st place, gold medalist(s)	2nd place, silver medalist(s)	3rd place, bronze medalist(s)	**Total**	Rec	Points
1st place, gold medalist(s)	Ateneo	11	8	4	23	2	475
2nd place, silver medalist(s)	La Salle						380
3rd place, bronze medalist(s)	UST		1	3	4		180
4	**UP**						173
5	UE						24

**Rec** - Number of new swimming records established
Event host in **boldface**

==== Awards ====
- Most Valuable Player: Jessie Khing Lacuna (Ateneo Blue Eagles)
- Rookie of the Year: Maurice Sacho Ilustre (De La Salle Green Archers)

=== Women's tournament ===
==== Team standings ====
Rank	Team	Medals				Rec	Points
Rank	Team	1st place, gold medalist(s)	2nd place, silver medalist(s)	3rd place, bronze medalist(s)	**Total**	Rec	Points
1st place, gold medalist(s)	Ateneo	10	8	6	24		530
2nd place, silver medalist(s)	**UP**						352
3rd place, bronze medalist(s)	La Salle						143
4	UST			3			127
5	UE						6

**Rec** - Number of new swimming records established
Event host in **boldface**

==== Awards ====
- Most Valuable Player: Kirsten Chloe Daos (Ateneo Lady Eagles)
- Rookie of the Year: Dara Michelle Carreon (Ateneo Lady Eagles)

Pos.	Pts.
1st	15
2nd	12
3rd	10
4th	8
5th	6
6th	4
7th	2
8th	1

=== Boys' tournament ===
==== Team standings ====
Rank	Team	Medals				Rec	Points
Rank	Team	1st place, gold medalist(s)	2nd place, silver medalist(s)	3rd place, bronze medalist(s)	**Total**	Rec	Points
1st place, gold medalist(s)	La Salle						409.5
2nd place, silver medalist(s)	UST	4	10	8	22		338
3rd place, bronze medalist(s)	Ateneo	8		3	11		150
4	UE						
5	**UP**						

**Rec** - Number of new swimming records established
Event host in **boldface**

==== Awards ====
- Most Valuable Player: Phillip Joaquin Santos (Ateneo Blue Eaglets)
- Rookie of the Year:

=== Girls' tournament ===
==== Team standings ====
Rank	Team	Medals				Rec	Points
Rank	Team	1st place, gold medalist(s)	2nd place, silver medalist(s)	3rd place, bronze medalist(s)	**Total**	Rec	Points
1st place, gold medalist(s)	DLSZ						398
2nd place, silver medalist(s)	UST	9	4	3	16		319
3rd place, bronze medalist(s)	**UPIS**						
4	Ateneo			3	3	2	30
5	UE						

**Rec** - Number of new swimming records established
Event host in **boldface**

==== Awards ====
- Most Valuable Player: Camille Lauren Buico (UST Growling Tigers)
- Rookie of the Year: Alexa Natividad (UPIS Junior Lady Maroons)

Pos.	Pts.
1st	15
2nd	12
3rd	10
4th	8
5th	6
6th	4
7th	2
8th	1

== Performance sports ==
=== Cheerdance ===
The UAAP Season 81 cheerdance competition was held on November 17, 2018 at the Mall of Asia Arena in Pasay. It was hosted by ABS-CBN Sports Anchor Nikko Ramos and "Upfront" host Janeena Chan. Cheerdance competition is an exhibition event. Points for the overall championship are not awarded to the participating schools.

==== Team standings ====
Rank	Team	Order	Tumbling	Stunts	Tosses	Pyramids	Dance	Penalties	Points	Percentage
1	NU Pep Squad	5	89.00	88.50	77.00	87.00	369.50	0	711.00	88.88 %
2	FEU Cheering Squad	7	82.50	85.00	70.00	75.00	347.00	–4	655.50	81.94 %
3	Adamson Pep Squad	8	73.50	86.00	69.00	78.00	334.00	–2	638.50	79.81 %
4	UST Salinggawi Dance Troupe	3	78.50	76.50	75.00	72.00	346.00	–10	638.00	79.75 %
5	UE Pep Squad	1	79.50	79.00	79.00	71.00	298.00	–4	602.50	75.31 %
6	UP Pep Squad	2	67.50	73.00	59.00	65.00	318.00	–14	568.50	71.06 %
7	Ateneo Blue Babble Battalion	6	62.50	77.00	47.00	64.00	316.50	–9	558.00	69.75 %
8	DLSU Animo Squad	4	58.50	68.00	34.00	63.00	257.00	–21	459.50	57.44 %

Order refers to order of performance.

== General championship summary ==
The general champion is determined by a point system. The system gives 15 points to the champion team of a UAAP event, 12 to the runner-up, and 10 to the third placer. The following points: 8, 6, 4, 2 and 1 are given to the rest of the participating teams according to their order of finish.

=== Medals table ===
==== Seniors' division ====
Rank	Team	Gold	Silver	Bronze	Total
1	University of Santo Tomas	7	6	4	17
2	Ateneo de Manila University	7	3	4	14
3	National University*	7	2	1	10
4	De La Salle University	4	6	5	15
5	University of the Philippines Diliman	1	6	6	13
6	Far Eastern University	1	6	1	8
7	Adamson University	1	0	4	5
7	University of the East	1	0	4	5
Totals (8 entries)		29	29	29	87

* Host nation (Season host); General champions
Notes: Results are final.

==== High school division ====
Rank	Team	Gold	Silver	Bronze	Total
1	University of the East	5	0	0	5
2	De La Salle Zobel	3	1	1	5
3	Nazareth School of National University*	2	3	0	5
4	Ateneo de Manila University	2	1	2	5
5	Far Eastern University–Diliman	1	1	1	3
6	University of Santo Tomas	0	6	3	9
7	UP Integrated School	0	0	1	1
8	Adamson University	0	0	0	0
Totals (8 entries)		13	12	8	33

* Host nation (Season host); General champions
Notes: Results are final.

=== General championship tally ===
==== Seniors' division ====
		Basketball		Volleyball (indoor)		Volleyball (beach)		Swimming		Chess		Tennis		Table tennis		Badminton		Taekwondo			Judo		Baseball	Softball	Football		Athletics		Fencing		Total			
Rank	Team	M	W	M	W	M	W	M	W	M	W	M	W	M	W	M	W	M	W	C	M	W	M	W	M	W	M	W	M	W	M	W	C	Overall
1	UST	4	10	6	12	15	15	10	8	6	6	10	6	15	15	4	4	12	12	12	15	15	8	12	6	10	1	15	6	12	118	152	12	282
2	La Salle	6	6	4	10	1	12	12	10	1	15	4	12	6	12	8	10	6	10	15	8	8	15	10	12	15	6	6	12	8	101	144	15	260
3	Ateneo	15	4	10	15	2	6	15	15	2	1	12	10	1	4	10	15	4	6	4	12	6	12	2	15	6	4	4	10	15	124	109	4	237
3	UP	12	1	1	6	4	10	8	12	4	12	6	8	4	10	12	12	8	8	10	10	12	4	6	10	8	15	10	8	6	106	121	10	237
5	NU (H)	2	15	15	4	10	8	—	—	12	2	15	15	12	2	15	8	15	15	8	—	—	6	8	2	—	8	—	—	—	112	77	8	197
6	FEU	8	12	12	8	12	2	—	—	15	4	—	—	10	8	—	—	2	2	6	—	—	—	—	8	12	12	12	4	4	83	64	6	153
7	UE	1	2	2	2	6	1	6	6	8	8	8	—	2	6	2	2	10	4	2	6	10	—	4	1	—	10	8	15	10	77	63	2	142
8	Adamson	10	8	8	1	8	4	—	—	10	10	2	—	8	1	6	6	—	—	—	—	—	10	15	4	—	2	2	—	—	68	47	0	115

(H) Season host; = Champion; = Runner-up; = Third place; — = No team.
Notes: Results are final.

==== High school division ====
		Basketball	Volleyball (indoor)		Swimming		Tennis		Judo	Baseball	Football	Athletics	Fencing		Total		
Rank	Team	B	B	G	B	G	B	G	B	B	B	B	B	G	B	G	Overall
1	UST	6	10	10	12	12	12	—	12	10	8	—	12	12	82	34	116
2	UE	2	6	4	8	6	15	15	6	—	—	15	15	15	67	40	107
3	DLSZ	4	4	15	15	15	—	12	10	8	6	—	—	—	47	42	89
4	Ateneo	12	2	—	10	8	—	—	15	15	10	—	—	8	64	16	80
5	NSNU (H)	15	15	12	—	—	—	—	—	12	12	—	—	—	54	12	66
6	FEU–D	10	12	6	—	—	—	—	8	—	15	—	—	—	45	6	51
7	Adamson	8	8	8	—	—	—	—	—	—	—	—	—	—	16	8	24
8	UPIS	1	1	2	6	10	—	—	—	—	—	—	—	—	8	12	20

(H) Season host; = Champion; = Runner-up; = Third place; — = No team.
Notes: Results are final.

== Broadcast notes ==
For the 3rd straight season since its broadcast deal renewal, ABS-CBN Sports will provide television and online coverage for all UAAP events. The games will be aired live on S+A Channel 23, S+A HD Channel 166, Liga & Liga HD and their website, sports.abs-cbn.com.

=== Commentator ===
- Boom Gonzales
- Mico Halili (Basketball only)
- Nikko Ramos (Basketball only)
- Anton Roxas
- Billie Capistrano (Volleyball only)
- Martin Javier (Volleyball only)
- Eric Tipan

=== Analyst ===
- Marco Benitez
- Bea Daez
- Enzo Flojo
- Martin Antonio
- Kirk Long
- Christian Luanzon
- Ronnie Magsanoc

== See also ==
- NCAA Season 94
