= 2018 UST Growling Tigers basketball team =

2018 UST Growling Tigers men's basketball

Record
- Elims rank: #6
- Final rank: #6
- 2018 record: 5–9
- Head coach: Aldin Ayo (1st season)
- Assistant coaches: Bonnie Garcia; Randy Alcantara
- Captain: Marvin Lee (4th season)

The 2018 UST Growling Tigers men's basketball team represented University of Santo Tomas in the 81st season of the University Athletic Association of the Philippines. The men's basketball tournament for the school year 2018-19 began on September 8, 2018, and the host school for the season was National University.

The Tigers finished sixth at the end of the double round-robin eliminations with 5 games and 9 losses. UST at one point during the second round was at fourth place in the standings, but they went on to lose all four of their remaining games and crashed out of the Final Four matches.

They had an average losing margin of 21.0 points and an average winning margin of 9.8 points.

Two of the Growling Tigers' opponents gave them blowout losses in both rounds of the eliminations. The Ateneo Blue Eagles won over them by 32 and 40 points in each round, while the De La Salle Green Archers won by 27 and 41 points.

The 41-point loss to La Salle was the worst in the career of Aldin Ayo, the one-time back-to-back NCAA and UAAP champion coach.

Returning fourth year point guard Renzo Subido was chosen Player of the Week by the UAAP Press Corps in the first round of eliminations for the duration of September 12–16, while rookie CJ Cansino received the citation twice on the weeks of October 10–14 and October 24–28.

Cansino, the Season 80 Juniors MVP also made history when he became the first rookie to score a triple-double since UAAP statistics were first officially recorded in 2003. Against the UE Red Warriors in the second round, Cansino tallied 20 points, 14 rebounds, and 10 assists.

The Growling Tigers also recorded a single-game league best 59 rebounds in their opening game on September 8, 2018, against the NU Bulldogs.

== Roster ==
UST Growling Tigers roster
Players
Coaches

Pos.	No.	Nat.	Name	Height	Year	High School
C	0	(Cameroon)	Steve Cedrick Akomo (injured)	6'9" (2.06m)	5th	Lycée bilingue de Fondonera
PF	2	(Philippines)	Ira Spencer Bataller	6'4" (1.93m)	1st	Arellano University High School
SF	4	(Philippines)	Mario Emmanuel Bonleon, Jr.	6'3" (1.91m)	4th	La Salle Greenhills
PG	5	(Philippines)	Henri Lorenzo Subido	5'9" (1.75m)	4th	De La Salle Santiago Zobel School
SG	6	(Philippines)	Dean Marvin Lee (C)	5'8" (1.73m)	4th	Far Eastern University-Diliman
SG	7	(Philippines)	Joshua Miguel Marcos	6'0" (1.83m)	1st	La Salle Greenhills
PG	8	(Philippines)	John Kenneth Zamora	5'11" (1.8m)	2nd	Arellano University High School
PG	10	(Philippines)	John Mark Lagumen	5'11" (1.8m)	1st	San Beda University–Rizal
C	11	(Philippines)	Enrique Caunan, Jr.	6'5" (1.96m)	4th	Colegio de San Juan de Letran
PF	13	(Philippines)	Zachary Lance Eden Huang	6'4" (1.93m)	4th	Sacred Heart School–Ateneo de Cebu
SG	15	(Philippines)	Toby Bryan Agustin	6'1" (1.85m)	1st	José Rizal University
PF	16	(Philippines)	Nathaniel Cosejo	6'3" (1.91m)	1st	De La Salle Santiago Zobel School
C	26	(Philippines)	Germy Mahinay	6'6" (1.98m)	1st	San Beda University–Rizal
SF	27	(Philippines)	Crispin John Cansino	6'2" (1.88m)	1st	University of Santo Tomas
C	41	(Philippines)	Arnold Dave Ando	6'7" (2.01m)	1st	University of San Jose–Recoletos

Head coach

- (Philippines) Aldin Ayo

Assistant coach(es)

- Bonifacio Garcia
- Randy Alcantara
- Jason Misolas
- McJour Luib
- Kristoffer Co
- Napoleon Garcia
- Ruden de Vera

Strength & conditioning coach(es)

- Philip Lee Go
- Marvin James Pangilinan
- Noel Zorilla

Team manager

- Francisco Juan Dumlao

Legend

- (C) Team captain
- Injured

- Roster

=== Depth chart ===
Pos.	Starting 5	Bench 1	Bench 2
C	Caunan	Mahinay	Ando
PF	Huang	Cosejo	Bataller
SF	Cansino	Bonleon
SG	Lee	Marcos	Agustin
PG	Zamora	Subido	Lagumen

== Roster changes ==
Only big man Jeepy Faundo has graduated, but the team experienced an exodus of players before the start of the UAAP season.

Regie Boy Basibas, who had suited up for the Tigers in their preseason games, and Joco Macasaet, their veteran center, were both faced with uncertainties regarding the league's age eligibility rules as both players were turning 25 within the school year. Both of them decided to move on from the team to play in the commercial leagues.

Jordan Sta. Ana also played in the preseason, but decided to go on leave for personal reasons. He later announced his transfer to Letran.

The official lineup for UST's Season 81 campaign consisted of nine new players (eight rookies, one transferee), four holdovers and two returnees.

With a champion coach tapped to handle the team, analysts have stressed how the team is still in a rebuilding phase and have once again predicted UST to miss out on a Final Four finish.

=== Subtractions ===
Pos.	No.	Nat.	Player	Height	Year	High school	Notes
SF	5	(Philippines)	Regie Boy Basibas	6' 3"	4th	Arellano University High School	Age ineligibility
PG	7	(Philippines)	John Jordan Sta. Ana	6' 0"	3rd	Nazareth School of National University	Transferred to Colegio de San Juan de Letran
PG	8	(Philippines)	Oliver Wendell de Guzman	5' 8"	3rd	Nazareth School of National University	Transferred to Arellano University
SG	10	(Philippines)	Martin Arthur Romero	6' 0"	2nd	De La Salle Santiago Zobel School	Academic deficiencies
PG	14	(Canada)	Ebenezer Godwin Kwawukumey	5' 7"	2nd	Vaughan Secondary School	Academic deficiencies
C	15	(Philippines)	Jeepy Faundo	6' 6"	5th	José Rizal University	Graduated
PF	16	(Philippines)	Justin Arana	6' 5"	4th	Basud National High School	Transferred to Arellano University
SF	17	(Philippines)	Jose Carlos Escalambre	6' 2"	4th	San Sebastian College-Recoletos	Academic deficiencies
SG	18	(Philippines)	Leon Alfonzo Lorenzana	6' 4"	2nd	University of Santo Tomas	Transferred to the University of the East
PF	19	(Philippines)	Christian Laurent Garcia	6' 4"	4th	Arellano University High School	Academic deficiencies
PF	20	(Philippines)	Vaughn Jorem Soriano	6' 4"	2nd	University of Santo Tomas	Relegated to Team B
C	21	(Philippines)	Jon Cornelius Macasaet	6' 3"	4th	San Sebastian College-Recoletos	Age ineligibility

=== Additions ===
Pos.	No.	Nat.	Player	Height	Year	High school	Notes
PF	2	(Philippines)	Ira Spencer Bataller	6' 4"	1st	Arellano University High School	Rookie
SF	4	(Philippines)	Mario Emmanuel Bonleon, Jr.	6' 3"	4th	La Salle Greenhills	Returning from Season 79
PG	5	(Philippines)	Henri Lorenzo Subido	5' 9"	4th	De La Salle Santiago Zobel School	Returning from Season 79
SG	7	(Philippines)	Joshua Miguel Marcos	6' 0"	1st	La Salle Greenhills	Rookie
PG	8	(Philippines)	John Kenneth Zamora	5' 11"	2nd	Arellano University High School	Transferred from Arellano University
PG	10	(Philippines)	John Mark Lagumen	5' 11"	1st	San Beda University–Rizal	Rookie
SG	15	(Philippines)	Toby Bryan Agustin	6' 1"	1st	José Rizal University	Rookie
PF	16	(Philippines)	Nathaniel Cosejo	6' 3"	1st	De La Salle Santiago Zobel School	Rookie
C	26	(Philippines)	Germy Mahinay	6' 6"	1st	San Beda University–Rizal	Rookie
SF	27	(Philippines)	Crispin John Cansino	6' 2"	1st	University of Santo Tomas	Rookie
C	41	(Philippines)	Arnold Dave Ando	6' 7"	1st	University of San Jose–Recoletos	Rookie

=== Recruiting class ===
Name	Pos.	Height	High school	Hometown	Commit date
CJ Cansino	SG	6' 2"	University of Santo Tomas	Valenzuela City	5 Mar 2018
CJ Cansino	2018 NBTC rank: #5				
Germy Mahinay	C	6' 6"	San Beda University–Rizal	Las Piñas	12 Jul 2018
Germy Mahinay	2017 NBTC rank: #22 (Division 1 champion)				
Joshua Marcos	SG	6' 1"	La Salle Greenhills	Mandaluyong	20 Mar 2018
Joshua Marcos	2018 NBTC rank: N/A (Division 1 finalist)				
Sources: 1 2 3 4 5 6

== Coaching changes ==
Aldin Ayo replaced Boy Sablan as head coach on January 11, 2018. The coaching change was announced by Institute of Physical Education and Athletics (IPEA) director Fr. Jannel Abogado following Sablan's resignation on November 20, 2017, together with his entire coaching staff.

Ayo, a former player of the 1998 and 1999 NCAA champion Letran Knights came into coaching prominence after leading the Knights to the 2015 championship on his first year and duplicating the feat when he jumped over to the UAAP to lead La Salle to the 2016 championship. At the end of Season 80, he made a decision to sign with UST where he will coach the men's basketball team for the next six years.

=== Coaching staff ===
Appointed as Ayo's deputies were McJour Luib, Kristoffer Co, Bonnie Garcia, Randy Alcantara, Jason Misolas, Nap Garcia, Ruden de Vera, Philip Go, Marvin Pangilinan, and Noel Zorilla.

- McJour Luib was a player of the 2015 NCAA champion Letran Knights under Ayo. After his second and last playing year in 2016, he accepted an invitation to be in Ayo's coaching staff at La Salle. He was the first to join Ayo at UST, where aside from scouting opponents, he will also coach the Tiger Cubs' under-15 basketball team.
- Kristoffer Co was also a member of Ayo's coaching staff at La Salle.
- Bonnie Garcia is a veteran coach who led the Colegio de San Lorenzo Griffins to the 2017 UCBL and NCR-UCLAA championships.

He was also the head coach of the Sta. Lucia basketball team in the PCBL in 2015, as well as a team consultant for the FedEx Express team in the PBA before becoming full-fledged coach in 2003. The former coach of the Manuel L. Quezon University Pythons also called shots in the MBA: for the Pampanga Dragons in 2000, and the Laguna Lakers in 1998 and 2001. He was an assistant coach of the Mapúa Cardinals under Atoy Co, and the San Beda Red Lions under Frankie Lim.

As a collegiate player, Garcia was the team captain of the three-time Metro Manila Universities Athletic Association (MMUCAA) champions, the FEATI University Hi-Flyers.

He was chosen to replace Chris Cantonjos as the head coach of the UST Tiger Cubs.

- Randy Alcantara is the head coach of the San Juan Knights basketball team in the MPBL and the Malayan High School of Science Red Robins. He is also an assistant coach of the Mapúa Cardinals under Atoy Co.

Alcantara was being seriously considered to replace Aldin Ayo as Letran's head coach but school officials eventually decided to hire Jeff Napa for the position.

He was a former Mapúa Cardinal who played for the Tanduay franchises in the PBL and in the MBA for the Laguna Lakers under coach Bonnie Garcia. He was picked by the Formula Shell team in the third round of 1998 PBA rookie draft.

- Former PBA player Jason Misolas was a teammate of Aldin Ayo at Letran when they won the NCAA men's basketball title in 1999.
- Napoleon Garcia is a member of the Letran Knights' coaching staff under Jeff Napa. He was also an assistant coach of the University of Baguio Cardinals and the San Sebastian Staglets juniors basketball team.
- Ruden de Vera was one of Ayo's assistant coaches at Aemillanum College in Sorsogon City in 2009.
- Philip Lee Go was hired as the strength and conditioning coach of the Growling Tigers. He has been the strength and conditioning coach of the Café France team in the PBA D-League since 2012. He also joined the San Juan Knights' staff in the MPBL and the Saint Stephen's High School later in the year.
- Marvin Pangilinan has been the physical therapist of the Tigers since 2017. He has been the strength and conditioning coach of the basketball and volleyball teams of Mapúa since 2016, and Chiang Kai Shek since 2014. He also served as Kaya FC's physiotherapist from 2015 until 2016.
- Noel Zorilla was a UST Yellow Jackets' head cheerleader. He is also the strength and conditioning coach of the Adamsom Lady Falcons basketball team and the Imus Bandera team in the MPBL.

== Injuries ==
- Steve Akomo's season was cut short after only four games due to a season-ending concussion. He missed the October 3 game against La Salle on suspected food poisoning, but was later found to have blood clots in the head.

Akomo was also not able to play in the preseason due to a knee injury.

- CJ Cansino sustained an ACL injury during their game against the UP Fighting Maroons in the second round. He sprained his left foot during their previous game against the Adamson Falcons and had to be assisted in getting up for treatment in the team's locker room. He came back to finish the game with less than two minutes left in the fourth quarter. He also sprained his ankle as a result of a bad landing from a layup drive at the end of the first half during their game against UE in the second round. He came back to start the second half and ended the game with a triple-double.
- Renzo Subido missed their game against the UE Red Warriors in the second round after suffering an injury on his left ankle. He was back for their next game against La Salle. He also missed some preseason games due to another ankle injury.
- JM Lagumen injured his right leg in the second round of eliminations which caused him to miss the remaining games of the season.
- Mario Bonleon had a few on-and-off injuries throughout the season. He had a shoulder injury during one of their preseason games and got injured again with less than two months to go before the start of the UAAP tournament.
- Enric Caunan missed some preseason games due to a foot injury.

== Schedule and results ==
=== Preseason tournaments ===
The Filoil Preseason Cup games were aired on 5 Plus and ESPN 5. The UCBL games were aired on Solar Sports.

Preseason game log

12th Filoil Flying V Preseason Premier Cup: 2–6
Game	Date • Time	Opponent	Result	Record	High points	High rebounds	High assists	Location
1	Apr 22	Letran Knights	L 90–95	0–1	Basibas (16)			Filoil Flying V Centre; San Juan
2	May 11	San Sebastian Stags	L 71–79	0–2	Lee (23)			Filoil Flying V Centre; San Juan
3	May 15	JRU Heavy Bombers	W 98–88	1–2	Subido (24)			Filoil Flying V Centre; San Juan
4	May 18	Adamson Soaring Falcons	L 64–87	1–3	Lee (15)			Filoil Flying V Centre; San Juan
5	May 22	Benilde Blazers	L 87–99	1–4	Zamora (22)			Filoil Flying V Centre; San Juan
6	May 25	FEU Tamaraws	L 82–86	1–5	Huang (23)			Filoil Flying V Centre; San Juan
7	Jun 12	Lyceum Pirates	L 88–93	1–6	Lee (18)			Filoil Flying V Centre; San Juan
8	Jun 15	Arellano Chiefs	W 82–73	2–6	Subido (30)			Filoil Flying V Centre; San Juan

2018 UCBL Summer Tournament: 4–6
Game	Date • Time	Opponent	Result	Record	High points	High rebounds	High assists	Location
1 (Note: Sherwin Concepcion, Soulémane Chabi Yo, Rhenz Abando, and Brent Paraiso are all in the Team B roster)	May 9	JRU Heavy Bombers	L 87–93	0–1	Concepcion (38)			Philippine Buddhacare Academy; Quezon City
2	May 13	CEU Scorpions	L 80–81	0–2	Cansino (17)			Philippine Buddhacare Academy; Quezon City
3	May 16	Olivarez College Sea Lions	W 79–77	1–2	Concepcion (21)			Philippine Buddhacare Academy; Quezon City
4	May 20	NU Bulldogs	L 68–73	1–3	Concepcion (18)			Philippine Buddhacare Academy; Quezon City
5	May 23	Diliman College Blue Dragons	W 74–68	2–3	Chabi Yo (23)			Philippine Buddhacare Academy; Quezon City
6	May 27	JRU Heavy Bombers	W 79–67	3–3	Abando (17)			Philippine Buddhacare Academy; Quezon City
7	May 30	CEU Scorpions	L 76–104	3–4	Concepcion (19)			Philippine Buddhacare Academy; Quezon City
8	Jun 3	NU Bulldogs	W 82–79	4–4	Concepcion (24)			Philippine Buddhacare Academy; Quezon City
9	Jun 6	Diliman College Blue Dragons	L 74–105	4–5	Paraiso (19)			Philippine Buddhacare Academy; Quezon City
10	Jun 13	Olivarez College Sea Lions	Cancelled					Philippine Buddhacare Academy; Quezon City
11	Jun 20	NU Bulldogs	L 82–89	4–6	Paraiso (34)			Philippine Buddhacare Academy; Quezon City

8th Kim Lope Asis Invitational: 4–0
Game	Date • Time	Opponent	Result	Record	High points	High rebounds	High assists	Location
1	Jun 26	UC Webmasters	W 78–71	1–0	Subido (17)			Lope Asis Memorial Gymnasium; Bayugan
2	Jun 27	SWU Cobras	W 95–89^{OT}	2–0	Subido (21)			Lope Asis Memorial Gymnasium; Bayugan
3	Jun 28	Lyceum Pirates	W 101–88	3–0	Subido (23)			Lope Asis Memorial Gymnasium; Bayugan
4	Jun 29	UC Webmasters; Championship game	W 88–83	4–0	Lee (20)			Lope Asis Memorial Gymnasium; Bayugan

33rd Kadayawan Basketball Invitational: 2–2
Game	Date • Time	Opponent	Result	Record	High points	High rebounds	High assists	Location
1	Aug 9	Davao-Go-Duterte Eagles	L 97–102	0–1	Lee (33)			Davao City Recreation Center
2	Aug 10	UC Webmasters	W 72–70	1–1	Lee (18)			Davao City Recreation Center
3	Aug 11	NU Bulldogs	W 80–65	2–1	Zamora (16)			Davao City Recreation Center
4	Aug 12	Davao-Go-Duterte Eagles; Championship game	L 90–94	2–2	Zamora (28)			Davao City Recreation Center

(#) Tournament seedings in parentheses.
All times are in UTC+08:00.

=== UAAP games ===
Elimination games were played in a double round-robin format and all of UST's games were televised on ABS-CBN Sports and Action and Liga.

UAAP Season 81 game log

Elimination round: 5–9
Game	Date • Time	Opponent	Result	Record	High points	High rebounds	High assists	Location
1	Sep 8 • 4:00 pm	NU Bulldogs	L 70–75	0–1	Cansino (20)	Akomo (14)	Tied (3)	Mall of Asia Arena; Pasay
2	Sep 12 • 2:00 pm	FEU Tamaraws	W 76–74	1–1	Subido (18)	Cansino (10)	Lee (4)	Smart Araneta Coliseum; Quezon City
	Sep 16 • 4:00 pm	UP Fighting Maroons	Postponed due to Typhoon Ompong					Filoil Flying V Centre; San Juan
3	Sep 22 • 2:00 pm	Adamson Soaring Falcons	L 71–79	1–2	Cansino (18)	Akomo (12)	Subido (3)	Smart Araneta Coliseum; Quezon City
4	Sep 29 • 4:00 pm	Ateneo Blue Eagles	L 53–85	1–3	Subido (19)	Cansino (10)	Lee (4)	Filoil Flying V Centre; San Juan
5	Oct 3 • 2:00 pm	De La Salle Green Archers	L 72–99	1–4	Subido (16)	Cosejo (7)	Zamora (5)	Mall of Asia Arena; Pasay
6	Oct 6 • 2:00 pm	UE Red Warriors	W 80–66	2–4	Subido (22)	Cansino (17)	Cansino (4)	Mall of Asia Arena; Pasay
7	Oct 10 • 2:00 pm	UP Fighting Maroons; End of R1 of eliminations	W 86–72	3–4	Cansino (16)	Huang (13)	Cansino (7)	Mall of Asia Arena; Pasay
8	Oct 14 • 2:00 pm	FEU Tamaraws	W 78–70	4–4	Huang (20)	Cansino (12)	Lee (5)	Mall of Asia Arena; Pasay
9	Oct 21 • 2:00 pm	NU Bulldogs	L 61–69	4–5	Subido (18)	Cansino (18)	Cansino (5)	Filoil Flying V Centre; San Juan
10	Oct 28 • 2:00 pm	UE Red Warriors	W 79–68	5–5	Lee (30)	Cansino (14)	Cansino (10)	Filoil Flying V Centre; San Juan
11	Nov 3 • 2:00 pm	De La Salle Green Archers	L 69–110	5–6	Lee (26)	Cansino (9)	Cansino (3)	Ynares Center; Antipolo
12	Nov 7 • 2:00 pm	Adamson Soaring Falcons	L 83–96	5–7	Subido (21)	Cansino (12)	Cansino (6)	Smart Araneta Coliseum; Quezon City
13	Nov 10 • 4:00 pm	UP Fighting Maroons	L 69–83	5–8	Lee (26)	Tied (5)	Marcos (3)	Smart Araneta Coliseum; Quezon City
14	Nov 14 • 2:00 pm	Ateneo Blue Eagles; End of R2 of eliminations	L 62–102	5–9	Subido (18)	Agustin (9)	Agustin (3)	Mall of Asia Arena; Pasay

(#) Tournament seedings in parentheses.
All times are in UTC+08:00.
Source: Imperium Technology

== UAAP Statistics ==
Player	GP	GS	MPG	FGM	FGA	FG%	3PM	3PA	3P%	FTM	FTA	FT%	RPG	APG	SPG	BPG	TOV	PPG
Renzo Subido	13	2	29.3	62	196	31.6	42	126	33.3	38	47	80.9	2.5	1.9	0.4	0.0	3.2	15.7
Marvin Lee	14	13	29.0	59	181	32.6	44	141	31.2	39	41	95.1	3.4	2.1	1.4	0.1	2.2	14.4
CJ Cansino	13	13	27.3	51	117	43.6	14	38	36.8	50	63	79.4	10.3	3.6	0.5	0.2	2.9	12.8
Steve Akomo	4	1	25.4	15	28	53.6	0	0	0.0	9	16	56.3	9.5	0.3	0.0	1.8	2.3	9.8
Zach Huang	14	12	22.7	40	100	40.0	1	9	11.1	35	53	66.0	6.0	1.2	0.3	0.0	1.1	8.3
Germy Mahinay	13	0	17.2	23	56	41.1	0	0	0.0	12	22	54.6	5.7	0.2	0.2	0.5	1.9	4.5
Joshua Marcos	14	2	12.8	18	43	41.2	4	14	28.6	9	18	50.0	2.9	1.1	0.1	0.1	1.6	3.5
Ken Zamora	14	12	17.2	14	78	18.0	11	66	16.7	7	10	70.0	1.6	1.5	0.3	0.0	0.6	3.3
Enric Caunan	13	13	12.9	16	42	38.1	0	0	0.0	6	8	75.0	2.4	0.4	0.0	0.9	0.4	2.9
Ira Bataller	12	1	13.4	9	35	25.7	2	13	15.4	9	16	56.2	3.1	0.6	0.0	0.0	1.3	2.4
Toby Agustin	10	0	9.0	9	24	37.5	1	5	20.0	5	8	62.5	2.4	0.5	0.1	0.5	0.8	2.4
Mario Bonleon	8	0	5.9	5	17	29.4	1	10	10.0	4	6	66.7	0.8	0.5	0.0	0.1	0.5	1.9
Nat Cosejo	11	1	9.7	8	28	28.6	1	3	33.3	3	6	50.0	3.5	0.3	0.0	0.1	0.5	1.8
Dave Ando	2	0	6.2	1	3	33.3	0	0	0.0	0	0	0.0	1.0	0.0	0.0	0.0	0.0	1.0
JM Lagumen	3	0	4.2	1	5	20.0	0	1	0.0	0	0	0.0	1.0	0.0	0.3	0.0	0.3	0.7
Total	14		40.0	328	954	34.4	121	426	28.4	226	313	72.2	44.8	12.9	3.4	2.6	17.1	72.1
Opponents	14		40.0	440	834	52.8	86	313	27.5	182	257	70.8	44.5	16.4	5.9	4.8	13.0	82.0

Legend
GP	Games played	GS	Games started	MPG	Minutes per game
FGM	Field-goal made	FGA	Field-goal attempts	FG%	Field-goal percentage
3PM	3-point field-goal made	3PA	3-point field-goal attempts	3P%	3-point field-goal percentage
FTM	Free-throw made	FTA	Free-throw attempts	FT%	Free-throw percentage
RPG	Rebounds per game	APG	Assists per game	SPG	Steals per game
BPG	Blocks per game	TOV	Turnovers per game	PPG	Points per game

Source: Imperium Technology

== Awards ==
Name	Award	Date	Ref.
Team	Kadayawan Invitational runners-up	12 Aug 2018	
Team	Kim Lope Asis Invitational champions	29 Jun 2018	
Renzo Subido	Kim Lope Asis Invitational MVP	29 Jun 2018	
Renzo Subido	Player of the Week	12–16 Sep 2018	
CJ Cansino	Player of the Week	10–14 Oct 2018	
CJ Cansino	Player of the Week	24–28 Oct 2018	
