= Bright Akhuetie =

Nigerian basketball player

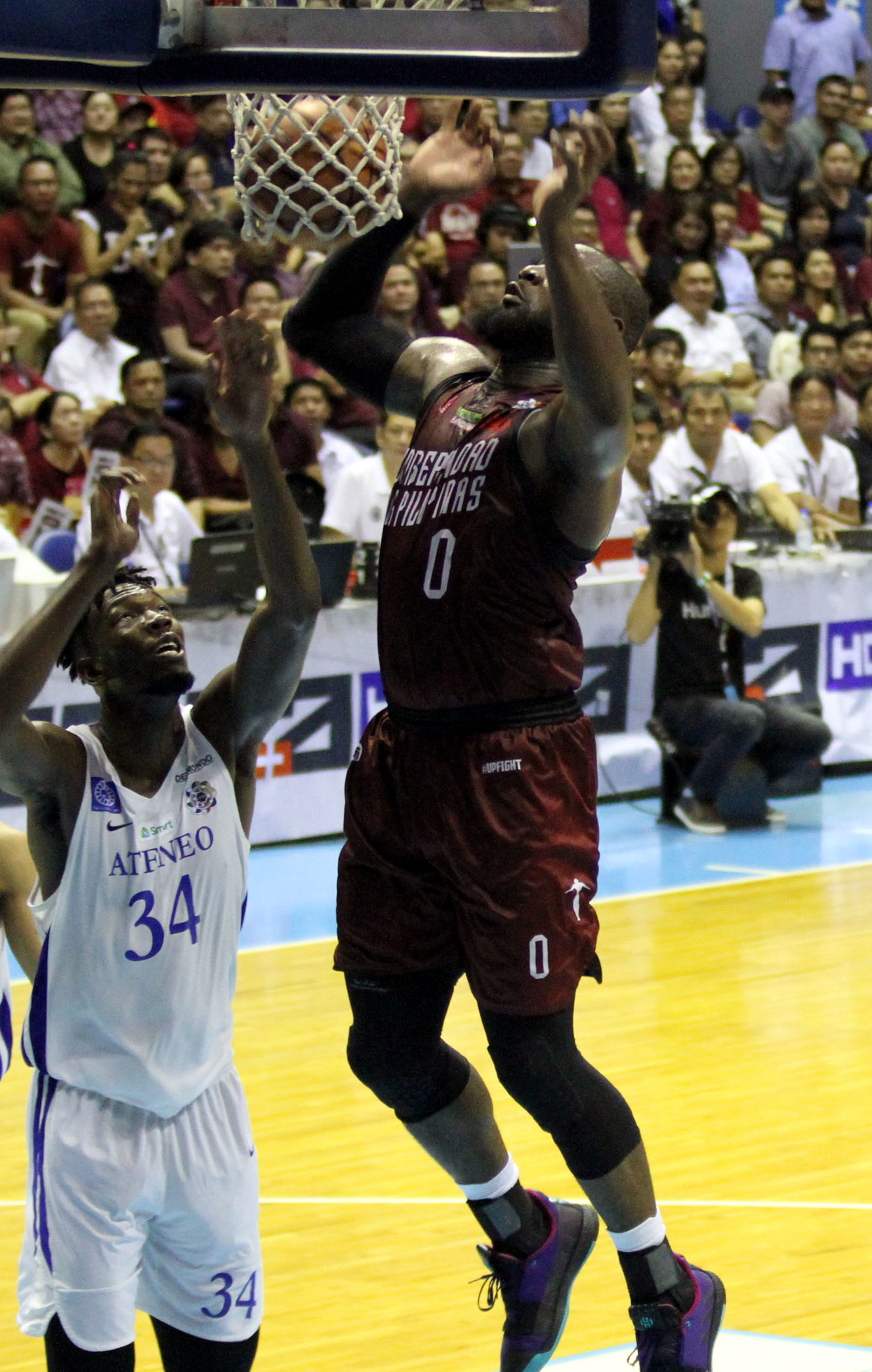
- Akhuetie (right) with UP Fighting Maroons in 2018

Personal information
- Born: September 12, 1996 (age 30) Kaduna, Nigeria
- Listed height: 6 ft 8 in (2.03 m)
- Listed weight: 251 lb (114 kg)

Career information
- College: Perpetual (2014–2016); UP (2018–2019)
- Playing career: 2023–present
- Position: Center

Career history
- 2023: KPA

Career highlights
- UAAP Most Valuable Player (2018); UAAP Mythical Team (2018); 2× NCAA Mythical Team (2015, 2016); NCAA All-Star Game Most Valuable Player (2016); NCAA Defensive Player of the Year (2015)

Bright Osagie Akhuetie (born September 12, 1996) is a Nigerian basketball player who last played for the UP Fighting Maroons of the University Athletic Association of the Philippines (UAAP). He also played for the Nigeria national team.

== Early life and education ==
Akhuetie was born on September 12, 1996, in Kaduna, Nigeria, to Christopher and Roseline Akhuetie. He has three brothers and a sister. Bright was initially into football like his father and would play the sport with neighbors in competitions they would organize themselves. As a football player, Akhuetie started out as a striker but later transitioned into a defender.

In Nigeria he attended Comprehensive College. When he moved to the Philippines, Akhuetie entered the University of Perpetual Help System DALTA but later moved to the University of the Philippines Diliman where he decided to pursue a major degree in physical education.

== Amateur career ==
=== Early years in Nigeria ===
Akhuetie was scouted by a basketball coach when he was playing as a goalkeeper for his local football team after their side's original goalkeeper didn't show up for their match. He then went on to briefly play for Comprehensive College before moving to the Philippines.

=== NCAA ===
Akhuetie played for the Perpetual Help Altas in the National Collegiate Athletic Association (NCAA) of the Philippines. As an Altas player, he played for two seasons where he was named part of the Mythical Five in both occasions despite not able to lead his team in the playoffs in his first season. In 2016, he decided to leave the school. His deteriorated relations with Perpetual coach Jimwell Gican, who earlier replaced Aric del Rosario, was a factor to his decision.

On January 10, 2017, he was released from Perpetual Help with consent from Anthony Tamayo, the school's owner after committing to transfer to the University of the Philippines Diliman.

=== PCBL ===
The Mighty Sports had Akhuetie as one its players when they participated in the Pilipinas Commercial Basketball League, an amateur commercial basketball league, in 2016. He also helped the team win the invitational 2016 Republica Cup. The team had Bo Perasol as part of its staff which would later be instrumental to Akhuetie's move to the University of the Philippines in 2017.

=== UAAP ===
After his release from Perpetual Help, Akhuetie had to sit out UAAP Season 80 and serve residency requirements before he could suit up for the UP Fighting Maroons in the University Athletic Association of the Philippines (UAAP). At the time of his move, the University of the Philippines haven't won the UAAP basketball title since 1986 and haven't been part of the Final Four since 1997. The Ateneo de Manila University was also interested in having Akhuetie play for the Blue Eagles but he was convinced to play for UP.

Eligible to play for two seasons, Akhuetie debuted for the Fighting Maroons in UAAP Season 81 in 2018 and lead them to their first Final Four appearance since 1997. He was named MVP and was part of the Mythical Five for UAAP Season 81. It has been 32 years since the University of the Philippines had a men's basketball UAAP MVP with the honor last awarded to Eric Altamirano in 1986. Akheutie last played for the Maroons in Season 82.

=== Chooks-to-Go Pilipinas team ===
Akhuetie was among the foreign players considered to form part of the Philippine national team which would play in the 2017 FIBA Asia Champions Cup as a club side under the name "Chooks-to-Go Pilipinas". However Akhuetie, who was at that time serving residency requirements, was not selected as part of the final roster due to concerns that his participation would affect his eligibility in the UAAP.

== 3x3 basketball ==
Bright Akhuetie played competitive 3x3 basketball with Team Manila at the 2016 FIBA 3x3 All Stars in Doha, Qatar. Akhuetie played with CJ Perez, Sidney Onwubere, and Rey Guevarra in the competition. Their team finished 7th out of eight competitors ahead only of McGill University of Canada.

== Professional career ==
In October 2023, Akhuetie played for Kenyan side KPA in the Road to BAL tournament. He averaged 8.3 points and 5.3 rebounds in three games for the Kenyan side.

== National team career ==
Akheutie has played for the Nigerian national team. He made his debut for the team in November 2021 in the 2023 FIBA Basketball World Cup qualifiers.
