= UE Lady Red Warriors volleyball =

Team of University of the Philippines

UE Lady Red Warriors
- University: University of the East
- Nickname: Lady Red Warriors
- Location: Manila, Philippines
- Head coach: Jerry Yee

Main league
- League: UAAP
- Season 87 (2025): 8th

Other league/s
- League: V-League
- 2024: (bronze) 3rd

Championships
- UAAP: 5

The UE Lady Red Warriors are the collegiate women's varsity volleyball team of the University of the East. The team competes in the University Athletic Association of the Philippines (UAAP).

== History ==
The University of the East has been competing in women's volleyball in the University Athletic Association of the Philippines (UAAP) entering the league as a probationary member in 1952.

It last reached the semifinals of the UAAP volleyball championship in Season 67 in 2007. In 2017, UE entered the Philippine Super Liga as part of a partnership with roofing materials manufacturer Cherrylume. The team, going by the Cherrylume Iron Lady Warriors, weren't able to contend against the PSL's member teams when they competed in the 2017 All-Filipino Conference and 2018 Invitational Cup conferences. However, they saw some success in the 2018 Collegiate Grand Slam when they finished third.

In mid-2023 in the lead up to Season 86, the Lady Red Warriors secured a sponsorship deal with Strong Group Athletics (SGA) which covers two seasons.

They went on to finish third placers in the 2023 and 2024 V-League Collegiate Challenge.

During Season 87, the Lady Red Warriors experienced internal issues. The team was later disbanded on June 9, 2025. The team did not win games with interim coach Allan Mendoza alleging mistreatment from the management which began when they requested funds for their participation in the 2024 Shakey's Super League Pre-season Championship although the crisis only became publicly visible when five core players and coach Obet Vital moved to the UP Fighting Maroons SGA's contract with UE on the sponsorship of the women's volleyball team ended on May 31, 2025 after the conclusion of Season 87.

== Roster ==
=== UE Lady Red Warriors volleyball team ===
UAAP Season 86 roster
Number	Player	Position	Height	Birth date	High School
4	Dea Pauline Villamor	Outside Hitter/Libero	5 ft 3 in (1.60 m)		UE High School
6	Claire Angela Castillo	Outside Hitter	5 ft 6 in (1.68 m)		Maryhill College
8	Yesha Keith Rojo	Middle Blocker	5 ft 6 in (1.68 m)		Adamson High School
9	Casiey Monique Dongallo	Outside Hitter	5 ft 7 in (1.70 m)	June 13, 2005 (age 21)	California Academy–Antipolo
10	Shammel Gracen Fernandez	Opposite Hitter/Setter	5 ft 7 in (1.70 m)		California Academy–Antipolo
12	Kizzie Madriaga	Setter	5 ft 3 in (1.60 m)		California Academy–Antipolo
13	Kayce Balingit	Opposite Hitter	5 ft 7 in (1.70 m)	August 19, 2001 (age 25)	San Mariano National High School
14	Ashley Cañete	MB/OPP	5 ft 7 in (1.70 m)		King's Montessori School
15	Percae Darabella Nieva	Opposite Hitter	5 ft 7 in (1.70 m)		Escuela de Sophia of Caloocan Inc.
16	Jenina Marie Zeta	Libero	5 ft 1 in (1.55 m)		Adamson High School
17	KC Cepada	Opposite Hitter	5 ft 4 in (1.63 m)		UST High School
19	Riza Nogales	Middle Blocker	1.82 m (6 ft 0 in)	December 30, 2002 (age 23)	Manlabong High School–Sorsogon
20	Angelica Reyes	Libero	5 ft 2 in (1.57 m)		UE High School

== Team honors ==
=== UAAP ===
UE Lady Red Warriors
Year	UAAP Season	Title	Ref
1963–1964	26	Champions	
1964–1965	27	Champions	
1965-1966	28	Champions	
1968-1969	31	Champions	
1969-1970	32	Champions	
2000–2001	61	Runner-up	
2003–2004	64	Runner-up	
2006–2007	67	Runner-up	

==== SSL ====
UE Lady Red Warriors
Year	Season	Title	Ref
2022	Pre-Season	9th place	
2023	Pre-Season	6th place	
2024	Pre-Season	7th place	

=== Other Collegiate Leagues ===
UE Lady Red Warriors
Year	Tournament	Title	Ref
2006	1st	8th place	
2018 PSL	Collegiate	2nd Runner-up	
2023 V-League	Collegiate	2nd Runner-up	

== Individual honors ==
=== UAAP ===
UE Lady Red Warriors
Year	Season	Award	Player	Ref
2016-2017	UAAP Season 79	Best Digger	Kath Arado	
2017-2018	UAAP Season 80	Best Receiver	Kath Arado	
2017-2018	UAAP Season 80	Best Digger	Kath Arado	
2018-2019	UAAP Season 81	Best Setter	Laizah Ann Bendong	
2018-2019	UAAP Season 81	Best Libero	Kath Arado	

=== Other Collegiate Leagues ===
UE Lady Red Warriors
Year	Tournament	Award	Player	Ref
2018	2018 PSL Collegiate Grand Slam Conference	2nd Best Outside Spiker	Mean Mendrez	
2018	2018 PSL Collegiate Grand Slam Conference	Best Setter	Laizah Ann Bendong	
2018	2018 PSL Collegiate Grand Slam Conference	Best Libero	Kath Arado	

== Records by season ==
Records starting UAAP Season 56

UE Lady Red Warriors
Year	UAAP Season	Place	Team captain	Lost to (finalist or higher rank)
1993–1994	56	5th place		
1994–1995	57	4th place		
1995–1996	58	4th place		
1996–1997	59	4th place		
1997–1998	60	5th place		
1998–1999	61	3rd Place		
1999–2000	62	6th place		
2000–2001	63	5th place		
2001–2002	64	3rd Place		
2002–2003	65	5th place		
2003–2004	66	4th place		
2004–2005	67	3rd Place		
2005–2006	68	5th place		
2006–2007	69	4th place		
2007–2008	70	8th place		
2008–2009	71	6th place		
2009–2010	72	8th place		
2010–2011	73	8th place		
2011–2012	74	6th place		
2012–2013	75	8th place		
2013–2014	76	8th place		
2014–2015	77	8th place		
2015–2016	78	8th place		
2016–2017	79	7th place		
2017–2018	80	8th place		
2018–2019	81	7th place		
2019–2020	82	Cancelled		
2020–2021	83	Cancelled		
2021–2022	84	7th place		
2022–2023	85	8th place		
2023–2024	86	6th place		
2024–2025	87	8th place		
2025–2026	88	8th place		

== Coaches ==
- UAAP Season 70 - 73: (Philippines) Vangie de Jesus
- UAAP Season 74 - 76: (Philippines) Boy Dalistan
- UAAP Season 77 - 79: (Philippines) Francis Vicente
- UAAP Season 80: (Philippines) Rod Roque
- UAAP Season 81 - 82: (Philippines) Ray Karl Dimaculangan
- UAAP Season 84 - 85: (Philippines) Ronwald Dimaculangan
- UAAP Season 86: (Philippines) Jerry Yee
- UAAP Season 86: (Philippines) Obet Vital
- UAAP Season 87: (Philippines) Allan Mendoza
- UAAP Season 88: (Philippines) Ronwald Dimaculangan

== Notable players ==
- (Philippines) Laizah Ann Bendong (S)
- (Philippines) Kath Arado (L)
- (Philippines) Riza Nogales (MB)
- (Philippines) Sue Roces (MB/OP)
- (Philippines) Judith Abil (OH)
- (Philippines) Mean Mendrez (OH)
- (Philippines) Shaya Adorador (OH/OP)
- (Philippines) Teresita Abundo
- (Philippines) Vangie de Jesus

Legend
S	Setter
L	Libero
MB	Middle Blocker
OS	Outside Hitter
OP	Opposite Hitter

== See also ==
- University of the East
- UE Red Warriors
- UE Red Warriors volleyball
