= UAAP Season 80 volleyball tournaments =

Filipino volleyball season

UAAP Season 80 Volleyball
- Host school: Far Eastern University
Men's Finals	G1	G2	Wins
NU Bulldogs	3	3	2
Ateneo Blue Eagles	0	1	0
- Duration: April 28 – May 2, 2018
- Arena(s): Araneta Coliseum
- Finals MVP: Bryan Bagunas
- Winning coach: Dante Alinsunurin
- Semifinalists: FEU Tamaraws; UST Growling Tigers
Women's Finals	G1	G2	Wins
De La Salle Lady Archers	3	3	2
FEU Lady Tamaraws	0	0	0
- Duration: April 28 – May 2, 2018
- Arena(s): Araneta Coliseum
- Finals MVP: Dawn Macandili
- Winning coach: Ramil De Jesus
- Semifinalists: Ateneo Lady Eagles; NU Lady Bulldogs
- TV network(s): ABS-CBN S+A, ABS-CBN S+A HD, Liga, Liga HD, The Filipino Channel
Boys' Finals	G1	G2	Wins
FEU–D Baby Tamaraws	1	2	0
UST Tiger Cubs	3	3	2
- Duration: November 27 & December 4
- Arena(s): Filoil Flying V Centre
- Finals MVP: Jaron Requinton
- Semifinalists: NUNS Bullpups; UE Junior Red Warriors
Girls' Finals	G1	G2	Wins
NUNS Lady Bullpups	3	3	2
UST Junior Tigresses	2	0	0
- Duration: November 27 & December 4
- Arena(s): Filoil Flying V Centre
- Finals MVP: Faith Nisperos
- Semifinalists: Zobel Junior Lady Archers; FEU–D Lady Baby Tamaraws

The UAAP Season 80 volleyball tournaments started on September 9, 2017 with the junior tournaments. The games were played at the Filoil Flying V Centre, Mall of Asia Arena, Smart Araneta Coliseum and the Blue Eagle Gym. It is also sub-hosted by National University.

== Men's tournament ==
=== Team line-up ===
Adamson Soaring Falcons
No.	Name	Position
1	AMBURGO, Lenard Franz	S
2	MANLAPAZ, Krister	
3	MIRANDA, Leo	OH
4	BELLO, Royce	MB
5	BONDOC, Ramses Paolo	
6	JIMENEZ, Carlo	S
7	YUDE, John Phillip (c)	OH
8	PABLICO, Paolo	MB
9	MILLARES, Ryan-Thed	
10	ALVAREZ, Mark	MB
11	NUGUID, John Phillip	L
12	MELGAR, Rence	L
13	LABANG, George	
	CUSTODIO, Domingo	HC

Ateneo Blue Eagles
No.	Name	Position
1	MAGADIA, Lawrence Gil R.	S
2	BAYSA, Karl Irvin T. (c)	OH
3	MEDALLA, Ron Adrian D.	OP
5	TAN, Jasper Rodney	MB
6	MORADO, Ariel Jr. C.	OH
9	LABAO, Herminio Jino P.	OH
10	TRINIDAD, Paulo Lorenzo S.	OP
12	NJIGHA, Chumason Celestine M.	MB
13	SUMAGUID, Manuel III D.	L
14	POLVOROSA, Esmilzo Joner T.	S
15	ESPEJO, Marck Jesus P.	OH
16	GLORIOSO, Gian Carlo A.	MB
17	CUERVA, Sebastian Enrique E.	OH
18	RIVERA, Ishmael John T.	OH
	ALMADRO, Oliver Allan	HC

De La Salle Green Archers
No.	Name	Position
1	REYES, Keiffer Arvex	MB
2	MACASPAC, Rafael	L
3	WOO, Raymark	OH
4	HENDRIYANTO, Randy	OH
5	DE LOS REYES, John David	MB
7	DUMAGO, Cris Bernard	OP
8	ONIA, John Arjay	OH
9	MARCO, Wayne Ferdi	S
10	JOSE, Joshua	MB
11	ASIA, Reuel	OH
14	MOVIDO, Jopet Adrian	L
15	MARAVILLA, Zosimo	OH
18	DIMAYUGA, Levin Anthony	OP
19	FREY, Mike (c)	OH
	MIGUEL, Norman	HC

FEU Tamaraws
No.	Name	Position
1	BARRICA, Jeremiah	L
2	SOLIS, Richard (c)	OP
3	SILANG, Kris Cian	S
4	SUAREZ, Owen Jaime	S
5	MAMERTO, Rikko Marius	L
6	HADLOCON, Kevin	
7	GARCIA, Jude	OH
8	BUGAOAN, John Paul	MB
9	DETABLAN, Christian	OH
10	PALER, Redijohn	OH
11	DABLO, Ralph Justine	MB
12	SALABSAB, John Paul	OH
14	BAUTISTA, Raymond	
15	QUIEL, Peter John	OH
	DIAZ, Reynaldo Jr.	HC

NU Bulldogs
No.	Name	Position
1	BAGUNAS, Bryan	OH
2	ANCHETA, John Paolo	S
3	DAYANDANTE, Kim Harold	S
5	PONTI, Krisvan	OH
6	MONDERO, Banjo	OH
8	SUMAGUI, Jann Mariano	L
9	NATIVIDAD, James Martin	OH
10	ISMAIL, Fauzi	OH
12	SAURA, Francis Phillip (c)	MB
14	DAYMIL, Berhashidin	MB
15	MARCOS, Ricky	L
17	MALABUNGA, Kim Niño	KB
18	GAMPONG, Madzlan	OP
	ALINSUNURIN, Dante	HC

UE Red Warriors
No.	Name	Position
1	INOFERIO, Clifford	OH
2	BALQUIEDRA, Maric Glyne	OH
3	ADRIANO, Kim	OP
6	ALJAS, Alven	OH
7	IMPERIAL, Aldrin Rafael	S
8	ALBA, Angelu Noel	MB
10	BENITEZ, Jhett	L
12	ORTEGA, Geric Rodmar (c)	OH
13	ERNACIO, Danio	L
14	PATACSIL, Bom Febryx	OH
	ROQUE, Rod	HC

UP Fighting Maroons
No.	Name	Position
1	BALDELOVAR, Jerahmeel	S
3	CONSUELO, Nicole Brylle	OH
4	CASTILLO, John Mark Joshua	MB
5	GOHOC, Matthew	MB
6	SAN PEDRO, Jerry Earl Jr. (c)	OH
7	NASOL, John Miguel	L
8	FORTES, Joshua Emmanuel	OH
9	MADRIGALEJOS, John Carlo	L
10	MIGUEL, Wendel	OH
11	PEREZ, Patrick Vier	OH
12	MILLETTE, John Mark	OP
13	IJIRAN, Ruskin Joss	OH
15	ACUÑA, Charles Drake	S
18	SAN PASCUAL, Gian Kyle	MB
	CHUACUCO, Hans	HC

UST Growling Tigers
No.	Name	Position
1	SAWAL, Lester Kim	L
2	VALENZUELA, Vyxen Vaughn	OH
3	BAUSTITA, Arnold Jr.	OH
4	TAJANLANGIT, Jerald David	L
6	CASILAN, Aldous Darcy	S
7	SUMAGAYSAY, Jayvee	MB
9	TAJANLANGIT, Timothy James (c)	S
10	MEDINA, Manuel Andrei	OH
11	UMANDAL, Joshua	OP
12	CORDA, Hermel Gem	
14	BURO, Juren Jireh	MB
15	ICALINA, Isaiah	
16	CARODAN, Tyrone Jan	OP
	MAMON, Arthur Alan	HC

Legend
S	Setter
MB	Middle Blocker
OH	Outside Hitter
OP	Opposite Hitter
L	Libero
(c)	Team Captain
HC	Head coach

=== Elimination round ===
==== Team standings ====
Pos	Team	Pld	W	L	Pts	SW	SL	SR	SPW	SPL	SPR	Qualification
1	NU Bulldogs	14	12	2	35	37	14	2.643	1211	1053	1.150	Twice-to-beat in the semifinals
2	FEU Tamaraws (H)	14	12	2	35	39	16	2.438	1304	1219	1.070	Twice-to-beat in the semifinals
3	Ateneo Blue Eagles	14	11	3	34	36	14	2.571	1207	1070	1.128	Twice-to-win in the semifinals
4	UST Growling Tigers	14	6	8	19 (Note: Fourth-seed playoff: UST 3–2)	24	31	0.774	1215	1210	1.004	Twice-to-win in the semifinals
5	Adamson Soaring Falcons	14	6	8	18	24	26	0.923	1144	1128	1.014	Qualified to fourth-seed playoff
6	De La Salle Green Archers	14	5	9	16	23	29	0.793	1177	1178	0.999	
7	UP Fighting Maroons	14	4	10	11	18	33	0.545	1126	1196	0.941	
8	UE Red Warriors	14	0	14	0	4	42	0.095	809	1139	0.710	

Source: ABS-CBN Sports
Rules for classification: 1) number of wins; 2) if tied for #2 or #4, one-game playoff; 3) match points; 4) sets ratio; 5) points ratio; 6) head-to-head record ratio; 6) points ratio
(H) Host

==== Match-up results ====
	Round 1							Round 2						
Team ╲ Game	1	2	3	4	5	6	7	8	9	10	11	12	13	14
AdU	NU school colors	FEU school colors	UP school colors	UST school colors	Ateneo school colors	La Salle school colors	UE school colors	UE school colors	Ateneo school colors	UP school colors	NU school colors	La Salle school colors	FEU school colors	UST school colors
Ateneo	FEU school colors	NU school colors	UST school colors	UE school colors	Adamson school colors	UP school colors	La Salle school colors	La Salle school colors	Adamson school colors	FEU school colors	UP school colors	UST school colors	UE school colors	NU school colors
DLSU	UST school colors	UP school colors	FEU school colors	NU school colors	UE school colors	Adamson school colors	Ateneo school colors	Ateneo school colors	NU school colors	UE school colors	UST school colors	Adamson school colors	UP school colors	FEU school colors
FEU	Ateneo school colors	Adamson school colors	La Salle school colors	UP school colors	UE school colors	NU school colors	UST school colors	NU school colors	Ateneo school colors	UP school colors	UE school colors	Adamson school colors	UST school colors	La Salle school colors
NU	Adamson school colors	Ateneo school colors	UE school colors	La Salle school colors	UST school colors	FEU school colors	UP school colors	FEU school colors	UST school colors	La Salle school colors	Adamson school colors	UP school colors	UE school colors	Ateneo school colors
UE	UP school colors	UST school colors	NU school colors	Ateneo school colors	La Salle school colors	FEU school colors	Adamson school colors	Adamson school colors	UST school colors	La Salle school colors	FEU school colors	NU school colors	Ateneo school colors	UP school colors
UP	UE school colors	La Salle school colors	Adamson school colors	FEU school colors	Ateneo school colors	UST school colors	NU school colors	UST school colors	Adamson school colors	FEU school colors	Ateneo school colors	NU school colors	La Salle school colors	UE school colors
UST	La Salle school colors	UE school colors	Ateneo school colors	Adamson school colors	NU school colors	UP school colors	FEU school colors	UP school colors	NU school colors	UE school colors	La Salle school colors	Ateneo school colors	FEU school colors	Adamson school colors

Source: ABS-CBN Sports
= Win; = Loss

==== Game results ====
Team	AdU	ADMU	DLSU	FEU	NU	UE	UP	UST
Adamson		1–3	1–3	1–3	0–3	3–0	3–1	1–3
Ateneo	3–0		3–0	0–3	3–1	3–0	3–1	3–0
La Salle	1–3	1–3		1–3	0–3	3–1	3–0	2–3
FEU	3–1	3–2	3–1		1–3	3–0	3–1	3–1
NU	0–3	3–1	3–1	3–2		3–0	3–1	3–1
UE	0–3	0–3	0–3	0–3	0–3		0–3	1–3
UP	0–3	1–3	0–3	0–3	1–3	3–1		3–2
UST	3–1	0–3	3–1	2–3	0–3	3–1	0–3	

Source: ABS-CBN Sports
Legend: Blue = left column team win; Red = top row team win.

=== Playoffs / Finals ===
Fourth-seed playoff
Adamson	2
UST	3

Semifinals; Top seeds twice-to-beat
1	NU	3
4	UST	0
2	FEU	2	1
3	Ateneo	3	3

Finals; Best-of-three series
1	NU	3	3
3	Ateneo	0	1

=== Fourth-seed playoff ===
Elimination round results:

- (Feb 18) UST def. Adamson 3–1 • 25–20, 25–21, 14–25, 25–22
- (Apr 14) UST def. Adamson 3–1 • 25–23, 21–25, 25–16, 25–17

April 18; 2:00 PM (UTC +8:00)	Adamson Soaring Falcons	2–3	UST Growling Tigers	Filoil Flying V Centre, San Juan City; Attendance: 201
April 18; 2:00 PM (UTC +8:00)	(20–25, 23–25, 25–19, 25–23, 11–15); P–2			Filoil Flying V Centre, San Juan City; Attendance: 201

=== Semifinals ===
NU vs UST NU with twice-to-beat advantage.
Elimination round results:

- (Feb 25) NU def. UST 3–1 • 18–25, 25–21, 25–18, 25–18
- (Mar 14) NU def. UST 3–0 • 25–21, 25–16, 25–22

April 22; 2:00 PM (UTC +8:00)	NU Bulldogs	3–0	UST Growling Tigers	Mall of Asia Arena, Pasay; Attendance: 6,200
April 22; 2:00 PM (UTC +8:00)	(25–13, 25–13, 31–29); P–2			Mall of Asia Arena, Pasay; Attendance: 6,200

FEU vs Ateneo FEU with twice-to-beat advantage.
Elimination round results:

- (Feb 4) FEU def. Ateneo 3–0 • 25–18, 25–19, 25–22
- (Mar 17) FEU def. Ateneo 3–2 • 25–27, 23–25, 20–25, 25–21, 16–14

April 21; 2:00 PM (UTC +8:00)	FEU Tamaraws	2–3	Ateneo Blue Eagles	Mall of Asia Arena, Pasay; Attendance: 12,100
April 21; 2:00 PM (UTC +8:00)	(25–18, 13–25, 26–24, 23–25, 9–15); P–2			Mall of Asia Arena, Pasay; Attendance: 12,100

April 25; 2:00 PM (UTC +8:00)	FEU Tamaraws	1–3	Ateneo Blue Eagles	Filoil Flying V Centre, San Juan City; Attendance: 2,100
April 25; 2:00 PM (UTC +8:00)	(19–25, 25–18, 22–25, 18–25); P–2			Filoil Flying V Centre, San Juan City; Attendance: 2,100

=== Finals ===
NU vs Ateneo
Elimination round results:

- (Feb 7) ADMU def. NU 3–1 • 26–24, 25–21, 17–25, 25–19
- (Apr 15) NU def. ADMU 3–1 • 25–23, 21–25, 25–23, 25–19

April 28; 2:00 PM (UTC +8:00)	NU Bulldogs	3–0	Ateneo Blue Eagles	Smart Araneta Coliseum, Quezon City; Attendance: 6,700
April 28; 2:00 PM (UTC +8:00)	(25–20, 25–19, 25–23); P–2			Smart Araneta Coliseum, Quezon City; Attendance: 6,700

May 2; 2:00 PM (UTC +8:00)	NU Bulldogs	3–1	Ateneo Blue Eagles	Smart Araneta Coliseum, Quezon City; Attendance: 3,200
May 2; 2:00 PM (UTC +8:00)	(25–20, 31–29, 22–25, 33–31); P–2			Smart Araneta Coliseum, Quezon City; Attendance: 3,200

=== Awards ===
UAAP Season 80 men's volleyball champions
NU Bulldogs
Third title

- Most valuable player (Season): Marck Espejo (Ateneo Blue Eagles)
- Most valuable player (Finals): Bryan Bagunas (NU Bulldogs)
- Rookie of the Year: Ariel Morado Jr. (Ateneo Blue Eagles)
- Best scorer: Marck Espejo (Ateneo Blue Eagles)
- Best attacker: Marck Espejo (Ateneo Blue Eagles)
- Best blocker: Jayvee Sumagaysay (UST Growling Tigers)
- Best server: Marck Espejo (Ateneo Blue Eagles)
- Best digger: Jopet Movido (De La Salle Green Archers)
- Best setter: Esmilzo Joner Polvorosa (Ateneo Blue Eagles)
- Best receiver: Rikko Marius Marmeto (FEU Tamaraws)

=== Coaching changes ===
- UE Red Warriors: Coach Sammy Acaylar has resigned as Head Coach of the team, citing commitment issues with both UE and Perpetual Help, where he serves as the Men's Volleyball Head Coach and the school's Athletic Director. Coach Rod Roque took over as the interim head coach for both Men's and Women's teams.

== Women's tournament ==
=== Team Line-up ===
Adamson Lady Falcons
No.	Name	Position
2	ROQUE, May Jeannalyn	OH
3	FLORA, Bernadette	OH
4	PAAT, Mylene	OP
5	DACORON, Mary Joy	MB
6	PINAR, Ceasa Joria	OP
7	TEMPIATURA, Jellie	L
8	GALANZA, Jessica Margarett (c)	OH
9	PERMENTILLA, Chiara May	OH
10	PEREZ, Lea-Ann	MB
12	UY, Chrislyn	OH
13	SOYUD, Christine Joy	OP
14	PONCE, Tonnie Rose	L
17	EMNAS, Fenela Risha	S
	PADDA, Airess Star	HC

Ateneo Lady Eagles
No.	Name	Position
1	RAVENA, Princess Danielle Theris	L
3	WONG, Ma. Deanna Izabella	S
4	SAMONTE, Julianne Marie	OP
5	BAGUIWET, Vanessa	L
6	ABELLA, Bettina Andrea Paz	MB
7	MADAYAG, Madeleine Yrenea (c)	MB
8	BASA, Annmarie	MB
9	GASTON, Pauline Marie Monique	MB
10	TOLENTINO, Katrina Mae	OH
11	ELEAZAR, Sydney Alexandrine	L
12	GEQUILLANA, Candice	OP
13	MARAGUINOT, Jhoana Louisse	OH
14	DE LEON, Isabel Beatriz	MB
16	LO, Jennelle Marie	L
	BUNDIT, Anusorn	HC

De La Salle Lady Spikers
No.	Name	Position
1	BARROGA, Ezra Gyra	MB
2	CHENG, Desiree Wynea	OH
4	LAYUG, Arianne May	OP
5	MACANDILI, Dawn	L
6	COBB, Michelle Monique	S
7	LUNA, May	OH
8	TIU, Princess Justine	OH
9	INSTRELLA, Rovena Andrea	OP
10	BARON, Mary Joy (c)	MB
11	DY, Kim Kianna	OP
12	SAGA, Carmel June	DS/S
13	OGUNSANYA, Aduke Christine	MB
15	TIAMZON, Ernestine Grace	OH
16	IPAC, Norielle	MB
	DE JESUS, Ramil	HC

FEU Lady Tamaraws
No.	Name	Position
1	HERNANDEZ, Carlota	OH
2	PONS, Bernadeth (c)	OH
4	GUINO-O, Heather Anne	OH
5	DUREMDES, Ria Beatriz Glenell	L
6	AGUDO, Ivanna Marie	OP
8	CAYUNA, Maria Angelica	S
9	CALINAWAN, Marianne Marie	OH
10	BASAS, Toni Rose	OP
11	ATIENZA, Kyla Llana	L
12	NEGRITO, Kyle Angela	S
13	DOMINGO, Celine Elaiza	MB
14	CARANDANG, Czarina Grace	MB
15	MALABANAN, Jerrili	OH
16	VILLAREAL, Jeanette Virginia	MB
	PASCUA, George	HC

NU Lady Bulldogs
No.	Name	Position
3	SANTIAGO, Alyja Daphne (c)	MB
4	NABOR, Jasmine	S
5	SATO, Risa	MB
6	DOROMAL, Roma Joy	OP
8	CHAVEZ, Joni Anne Kamille	L
9	URDAS, Aiko Sweet	OP
11	DORIA, Roselyn	MB
13	VALDEZ, Gayle Rose	L
14	SINGH, Jorelle	OH
15	PARAN, Audrey Kathryn	OP
	CASTILLO, Raymund	HC

UE Lady Warriors
No.	Name	Position
1	ABIL, Judith	OH
4	MENDREZ, Mary Anne	MB
5	ARADO, Kathleen Faith	L
6	CATINDIG, Juliet	L
7	RODRIGUEZ, Seth Marione	MB
8	OLARVE, Zilfa Geline	OH
9	STA. MARIA, Jana Katrina	MB
10	CAMAMA, Isabelle	OP
11	ADORADOR, Maria Shaya	OH
12	BALITON, Roselle (c)	S
14	BENDONG, Laizah Ann	S
15	LOPEZ, Ma. Erika	MB
17	SANTOS, Remcel Joyce	MB
18	MANABAT, Mialyn	OH
	ROQUE, Rod	HC

UP Lady Maroons
No.	Name	Position
1	LICLICAN, Cynthia Maria	S
2	BASARTE, Mae Angeli	OP
3	LAYUG, Maristella Gene	MB
5	SIAO, Elise Patricia	L
6	THAI, Josette	L
9	RAMOS, Jessma Clarice	MB
10	MOLDE, Maria Lina Isabel	OH
11	BUITRE, Marian Alisa	MB
13	DOROG, Justine	OH
14	LIM, Abigail Marie	OH
16	CAILING, Rose Mary	S
17	ESTRAÑERO, Maria Arielle	S
18	CARLOS, Diana Mae (c)	OH
19	ROSIER, Roselyn	OP
	OKUMU, Godfrey	HC

UST Growling Tigresses
No.	Name	Position
1	TEOPE, Alyssa Marie	S
2	RIVERA, Rica Jane	L
4	VIRAY, Caitlyn	OP
5	SANDOVAL, Carla	OH
6	ALESSANDRINI, Milena	OH
7	BICAR, Alina Joyce	S
8	PACRES, Mary Dominique	OP
11	POLLENTES, Catherine Carmel	L
12	BANGAD, Maria Cecilia	OH
14	FRANCISCO, Christine Dianne	MB
16	RONDINA, Cherry Ann	OH
17	PALEC, Shannen (c)	MB
18	CAMALIGAN, Jessie Lyn	OP
19	DIZON, Mildred Thea	OH
	REYES, Emilio Jr.	HC

Legend
S	Setter
MB	Middle Blocker
OH	Outside Hitter
OP	Opposite Hitter
L	Libero
(c)	Team Captain
HC	Head coach

=== Elimination round ===
==== Team standings ====
Pos	Team	Pld	W	L	Pts	SW	SL	SR	SPW	SPL	SPR	Qualification
1	De La Salle Lady Archers	14	12	2	34	39	14	2.786	1227	1052	1.166	Twice-to-beat in the semifinals
2	FEU Lady Tamaraws (H)	14	10	4	31	36	20	1.800	1245	1168	1.066	Twice-to-beat in the semifinals
3	Ateneo Lady Eagles	14	9	5	26	32	24	1.333	1225	1173	1.044	Twice-to-win in the semifinals
4	NU Lady Bulldogs	14	7	7	19	25	28	0.893	1134	1188	0.955	Twice-to-win in the semifinals
5	Adamson Lady Falcons	14	6	8	21 (Note: Head-to-head record: Adamson 1–1 UP; Adamson +5)	30	30	1.000	1267	1238	1.023	
6	UP Lady Maroons	14	6	8	16	20	30	0.667	1083	1152	0.940	
7	UST Growling Tigresses	14	4	10	14	20	32	0.625	1156	1161	0.996	
8	UE Lady Warriors	14	2	12	7	15	39	0.385	1047	1252	0.836	

Source: ABS-CBN Sports
Rules for classification: 1) number of wins; 2) if tied for #2 or #4, one-game playoff; 3) match points; 4) sets ratio; 5) points ratio; 6) head-to-head record
(H) Host

==== Match-up results ====
	Round 1							Round 2						
Team ╲ Game	1	2	3	4	5	6	7	8	9	10	11	12	13	14
AdU	NU school colors	FEU school colors	UP school colors	UST school colors	Ateneo school colors	La Salle school colors	UE school colors	UP school colors	UE school colors	NU school colors	Ateneo school colors	FEU school colors	La Salle school colors	UST school colors
AdMU	FEU school colors	NU school colors	UST school colors	UE school colors	Adamson school colors	UP school colors	La Salle school colors	FEU school colors	NU school colors	UE school colors	Adamson school colors	UST school colors	UP school colors	La Salle school colors
DLSU	UST school colors	UP school colors	FEU school colors	NU school colors	UE school colors	Adamson school colors	Ateneo school colors	NU school colors	UP school colors	FEU school colors	UE school colors	UST school colors	Adamson school colors	Ateneo school colors
FEU	Ateneo school colors	Adamson school colors	La Salle school colors	UP school colors	UE school colors	NU school colors	UST school colors	Ateneo school colors	UST school colors	La Salle school colors	UP school colors	Adamson school colors	UE school colors	NU school colors
NU	Adamson school colors	Ateneo school colors	UE school colors	La Salle school colors	UST school colors	FEU school colors	UP school colors	La Salle school colors	Ateneo school colors	Adamson school colors	UST school colors	UP school colors	UE school colors	FEU school colors
UE	UP school colors	UST school colors	NU school colors	Ateneo school colors	La Salle school colors	FEU school colors	Adamson school colors	UST school colors	Adamson school colors	Ateneo school colors	La Salle school colors	NU school colors	FEU school colors	UP school colors
UP	UE school colors	La Salle school colors	Adamson school colors	FEU school colors	Ateneo school colors	UST school colors	NU school colors	Adamson school colors	La Salle school colors	UST school colors	FEU school colors	NU school colors	Ateneo school colors	UE school colors
UST	La Salle school colors	UE school colors	Ateneo school colors	Adamson school colors	NU school colors	UP school colors	FEU school colors	UE school colors	FEU school colors	UP school colors	NU school colors	Ateneo school colors	La Salle school colors	Adamson school colors

Source: ABS-CBN Sports
= Win; = Loss

==== Game results ====
Team	AdU	ADMU	DLSU	FEU	NU	UE	UP	UST
Adamson		2–3	3–1	3–2	1–3	2–3	3–0	0–3
Ateneo	3–2		1–3	2–3	2–3	3–1	3–0	3–1
La Salle	3–1	3–0		3–2	2–3	3–0	3–0	3–2
FEU	3–2	0–3	2–3		3–1	3–1	3–0	3–0
NU	1–3	0–3	0–3	1–3		3–1	3–0	3–1
UE	2–3	1–3	0–3	0–3	0–3		2–3	0–3
UP	3–2	3–0	0–3	1–3	3–0	3–1		3–1
UST	0–3	2–3	0–3	0–3	3–1	1–3	3–1	

Source: ABS-CBN Sports
Legend: Blue = left column team win; Red = top row team win.

=== Playoffs ===
Semifinals (Nos. 1 & 2 have twice-to-beat advantage)
1	La Salle	3
4	NU	0
2	FEU	3
3	Ateneo	1

Finals (Best-of-three series)
1	La Salle	3	3
2	FEU	0	0

=== Semifinals ===
La Salle vs NU La Salle with twice-to-beat advantage.
Elimination round results:

- (Feb 18) NU def. La Salle 3–2 • 26–24, 19–25, 22–25, 25–17, 16–14
- (Mar 10) La Salle def. NU 3–0 • 27–25, 27–25, 25–16

April 22; 4:00 PM	De La Salle Lady Archers	3–0	NU Lady Bulldogs	Mall of Asia Arena, Pasay; Attendance: 8,100
April 22; 4:00 PM	(27–25, 25–22, 25–11); P–2			Mall of Asia Arena, Pasay; Attendance: 8,100

FEU vs Ateneo FEU with twice-to-beat advantage.
Elimination round results:

- (Feb 4) FEU def. Ateneo 3–2 • 19–25, 25–21, 18–25, 25–20, 15–9
- (Mar 7) Ateneo def. FEU 3–0 • 25–19, 25–21, 25–17

April 21; 4:00 PM	FEU Lady Tamaraws	3–1	Ateneo Lady Eagles	Mall of Asia Arena, Pasay; Attendance: 13,790
April 21; 4:00 PM	(25–20, 25–21, 14–25, 25–19); P–2			Mall of Asia Arena, Pasay; Attendance: 13,790

=== Finals ===
La Salle vs FEU Best-of-three series.
Elimination round results:

- (Feb 14) DLSU def. FEU 3–2 • 25–22, 25–17, 24–26, 23–25, 15–7
- (Mar 18) DLSU def. FEU 3–2 • 25–17, 21–25, 16–25, 25–20, 15–5

April 28; 04:00 PM (UTC +8:00)	De La Salle Lady Archers	3–0	FEU Lady Tamaraws	Smart Araneta Coliseum, Quezon City; Attendance: 14,293
April 28; 04:00 PM (UTC +8:00)	(29–27, 25–21, 25–22); P–2			Smart Araneta Coliseum, Quezon City; Attendance: 14,293

May 2; 04:00 PM (UTC +8:00)	De La Salle Lady Archers	3–0	FEU Lady Tamaraws	Smart Araneta Coliseum, Quezon City; Attendance: 14,018
May 2; 04:00 PM (UTC +8:00)	(26–24, 25–20, 26–24); P–2			Smart Araneta Coliseum, Quezon City; Attendance: 14,018

=== Awards ===
UAAP Season 80 women's volleyball champions
De La Salle Lady Archers
11th title, third consecutive title

- Most valuable player (Season): Jaja Santiago (NU Lady Bulldogs)
- Most valuable player (Finals): Dawn Macandili (De La Salle Lady Archers)
- Rookie of the Year: Milena Alessandrini (UST Growling Tigresses)
- Best scorer: Sisi Rondina (UST Growling Tigresses)
- Best attacker: Jaja Santiago (NU Lady Bulldogs)
- Best blocker: Celine Elaiza Domingo (FEU Lady Tamaraws)
- Best server: Desiree Cheng (De La Salle Lady Archers)
- Best digger: Kath Arado (UE Lady Warriors)
- Best setter: Deanna Wong (Ateneo Lady Eagles)
- Best receiver: Kath Arado (UE Lady Warriors)

==== Players of the week ====
Week	Player	Ref.
February 3–4	Mary Joy Baron (De La Salle Lady Archers)	
February 7–11	Jaja Santiago (NU Lady Bulldogs)	
February 14–18	Jaja Santiago (NU Lady Bulldogs)	
February 21–25	Christine Joy Soyud (Adamson Lady Falcons)	
February 28–March 4	Kim Kianna Dy (De La Salle Lady Archers)	
March 7–10	Kath Arado (UE Lady Warriors)	
March 14–18	Kim Kianna Dy (De La Salle Lady Archers)	
March 21–25	Deanna Wong (Ateneo Lady Eagles)	
April 4–8	Bernadeth Pons (FEU Lady Tamaraws)	
April 11–15	Bernadeth Pons (FEU Lady Tamaraws)	

=== Coaching changes ===
- UE Lady Warriors: Coach Francis Vicente has resigned as Head Coach of the team after five games into the season due to undisclosed reasons. Coach Rod Roque, UE's Athletic Director, served as the interim head coach for both Men's and Women's teams.

== Boys' tournament ==
=== Elimination round ===
==== Team standings ====
Pos	Team	Pld	W	L	Pts	SW	SL	SR	SPW	SPL	SPR
1	NSNU Bullpups (H)	3	3	0	9	9	0	MAX	226	155	1.458
2	DLSZ Junior Archers	3	2	1	6	6	3	2.000	193	180	1.072
3	UST Tiger Cubs	3	2	1	6	7	4	1.750	258	212	1.217
4	FEU Baby Tamaraws	2	1	1	3	3	4	0.750	142	164	0.866
5	Adamson Baby Falcons	2	1	1	2	3	5	0.600	168	167	1.006
6	Ateneo Blue Eaglets	3	1	2	4	5	7	0.714	227	268	0.847
7	UE Junior Warriors	2	0	2	0	1	6	0.167	145	170	0.853
8	UPIS Junior Maroons	2	0	2	0	1	6	0.167	130	173	0.751

Rules for classification: Point system: 3 points = win match in 3 or 4 sets; 2 points = win match in 5 sets; 1 point = lose match in 5 sets; 0 point = lose match in 3 or 4 sets
(H) Host

==== Match-up results ====
	Round 1							Round 2						
Team ╲ Game	1	2	3	4	5	6	7	8	9	10	11	12	13	14
AdU	Ateneo school colors	La Salle school colors	UST school colors	UE school colors	NU school colors	UP school colors	FEU school colors	UP school colors	FEU school colors	Ateneo school colors	NU school colors	UE school colors	UST school colors	La Salle school colors
AdMU	NU school colors	UP school colors	FEU school colors	UE school colors	UST school colors	La Salle school colors	Adamson school colors	La Salle school colors	UST school colors	Adamson school colors	FEU school colors	NU school colors	UE school colors	UP school colors
DLSU	UP school colors	UST school colors	Adamson school colors	NU school colors	FEU school colors	Ateneo school colors	UE school colors	Ateneo school colors	NU school colors	UP school colors	UE school colors	UST school colors	FEU school colors	Adamson school colors
FEU	UST school colors	NU school colors	Ateneo school colors	UP school colors	La Salle school colors	UE school colors	Adamson school colors	UE school colors	Adamson school colors	UST school colors	Ateneo school colors	UP school colors	La Salle school colors	NU school colors
NSNU	UE school colors	Ateneo school colors	FEU school colors	La Salle school colors	Adamson school colors	UP school colors	UST school colors	UST school colors	La Salle school colors	UE school colors	Adamson school colors	Ateneo school colors	UP school colors	FEU school colors
UE	NU school colors	UST school colors	UP school colors	Adamson school colors	Ateneo school colors	FEU school colors	La Salle school colors	FEU school colors	UP school colors	NU school colors	La Salle school colors	Adamson school colors	Ateneo school colors	UST school colors
UPIS	La Salle school colors	Ateneo school colors	UE school colors	FEU school colors	UST school colors	NU school colors	Adamson school colors	Adamson school colors	UE school colors	La Salle school colors	UST school colors	FEU school colors	NU school colors	Ateneo school colors
UST	FEU school colors	La Salle school colors	UE school colors	Adamson school colors	UP school colors	Ateneo school colors	NU school colors	NU school colors	Ateneo school colors	FEU school colors	UP school colors	La Salle school colors	Adamson school colors	UE school colors

Source: ABS-CBN Sports
= Win; = Loss

==== Scores ====
Team	AdU	ADMU	DLSU	FEU	NU	UE	UP	UST
Adamson		3–2	0–3	–	–	–	–	0–3
Ateneo	–		–	–	0–3	–	3–1	0–3
La Salle	–	–		–	–	–	3–0	0–3
FEU	–	–	–		0–3	–	–	3–1
NU	–	–	–	–		3–0	–	3–2
UE	–	–	–	–	–		–	1–3
UP	–	–	–	–	–	–		0–3
UST	3–0	3–1	3–0	1–3	3–1	3–2	3–0	

Source: ABS-CBN Sports
Legend: Blue = left column team win; Red = top row team win.

=== Playoffs ===
2nd-seed playoff
3	NU	2
4	UST	3

Semifinals; Top seeds twice-to-beat
1	FEU	3
4	UE	2
2	UST	2	3
3	NU	3	0

Finals; Best-of-three series
1	FEU	1	2
2	UST	3	3

=== Finals ===
November 27; 2:00 PM (UTC +8:00)	FEU–D Baby Tamaraws	1–3	UST Tiger Cubs	Filoil Flying V Centre, San Juan City
November 27; 2:00 PM (UTC +8:00)	(23–25, 20–25, 25–21, 18–25)			Filoil Flying V Centre, San Juan City

December 4; 2:00 PM (UTC +8:00)	FEU–D Baby Tamaraws	2–3	UST Tiger Cubs	Filoil Flying V Centre, San Juan City
December 4; 2:00 PM (UTC +8:00)	(25–18, 25–22, 22–25, 22–25, 5–15)			Filoil Flying V Centre, San Juan City

=== Awards ===
UAAP Season 80 boys' volleyball champions
UST Tiger Cubs
First title

- Most valuable player (Season): Mark Frederick Calado (FEU–D Baby Tamaraws)
- Most valuable player (Finals): Jaron Requinton (UST Tiger Cubs)
- Rookie of the Year: CJ Segui (UST Tiger Cubs)
- First Best Outside Spiker: Mark Frederick Calado (FEU–D Baby Tamaraws)
- Second Best Outside Spiker: Lorence Cruz (NUNS Bullpups)
- First Best Middle Blocker: Jaron Requinton (UST Tiger Cubs)
- Second Best Middle Blocker: Lloyd Josafat (UE Junior Red Warriors)
- Best opposite spiker: Lorenz Senoron (UST Tiger Cubs)
- Best setter: Benny Martinez (FEU–D Baby Tamaraws)
- Best libero: Menard Guererro (NUNS Bullpups)
- Best server: Rey de Vega (UST Tiger Cubs)

== Girls tournament ==
=== Elimination round ===
==== Team standings ====
Pos	Team	Pld	W	L	Pts	SW	SL	SR	SPW	SPL	SPR
1	UST Junior Tigresses	8	8	0	24	24	2	12.000	566	414	1.367
2	NSNU Lady Bullpups (H)	6	5	1	15	16	4	4.000	481	354	1.359
3	DLSZ Junior Lady Archers	5	3	2	9	9	8	1.125	389	361	1.078
4	Adamson Lady Baby Falcons	6	2	4	6	8	13	0.615	423	470	0.900
5	UE Junior Amazons	4	1	3	2	4	11	0.364	299	341	0.877
6	FEU–D Lady Baby Tamaraws	5	1	4	4	7	12	0.583	368	410	0.898
7	UPIS Junior Lady Maroons	5	0	5	0	0	15	0.000	199	375	0.531

Rules for classification: Point system: 3 points = win match in 3 or 4 sets; 2 points = win match in 5 sets; 1 point = lose match in 5 sets; 0 point = lose match in 3 or 4 sets
(H) Host

==== Match-up results ====
	Round 1						Round 2					
Team ╲ Game	1	2	3	4	5	6	7	8	9	10	11	12
AdU	UE school colors	La Salle school colors	NU school colors	UP school colors	UST school colors	FEU school colors	FEU school colors	UST school colors	UP school colors	La Salle school colors	NU school colors	UE school colors
DLSZ	FEU school colors	UST school colors	Adamson school colors	UE school colors	UP school colors	NU school colors	NU school colors	UE school colors	UST school colors	Adamson school colors	FEU school colors	UP school colors
FEU	La Salle school colors	UE school colors	UST school colors	NU school colors	UP school colors	Adamson school colors	Adamson school colors	UST school colors	UE school colors	UP school colors	La Salle school colors	NU school colors
NU	UP school colors	UE school colors	Adamson school colors	FEU school colors	UST school colors	La Salle school colors	UP school colors	La Salle school colors	Adamson school colors	FEU school colors	UST school colors	UE school colors
UE	Adamson school colors	NU school colors	FEU school colors	La Salle school colors	UST school colors	UP school colors	La Salle school colors	FEU school colors	UP school colors	UST school colors	Adamson school colors	NU school colors
UP	UST school colors	NU school colors	Adamson school colors	FEU school colors	La Salle school colors	UE school colors	NU school colors	Adamson school colors	FEU school colors	UE school colors	UST school colors	La Salle school colors
UST	UP school colors	La Salle school colors	FEU school colors	UE school colors	Adamson school colors	NU school colors	Adamson school colors	FEU school colors	La Salle school colors	UP school colors	UE school colors	NU school colors

Source: ABS-CBN Sports
= Win; = Loss

==== Game results ====
Team	AdU	DLSZ	FEU-D	NSNU	UE	UPIS	UST
Adamson		1–3	–	1–3	3–1	3–0	0–3
DLSZ	–		3–1	0–3	–	3–0	0–3
FEU-D	–	–		0–3	2–3	3–0	1–3
NSNU	–	–	–		3–0	3–0	1–3
UE	–	–	–	–		–	0–3
UPIS	–	–	–	–	–		0–3
UST	3–0	3–0	3–0	–	–	3–0	

Source: ABS-CBN Sports
Legend: Blue = left column team win; Red = top row team win.

=== Playoffs ===
Semifinals (Nos. 1 & 2 have twice-to-beat advantage)
1	NU	3
4	FEU	1
2	UST	3
3	DLSZ	1

Finals (Best-of-three series)
1	NU	3	3
2	UST	2	0

=== Finals ===
November 27; 4:00 PM (UTC +8:00)	NUNS Lady Bullpups	3–2	UST Junior Tigresses	Filoil Flying V Centre, San Juan City
November 27; 4:00 PM (UTC +8:00)	(25–19, 17–25, 26–24, 23–25, 15–11)			Filoil Flying V Centre, San Juan City

December 4; 4:00 PM (UTC +8:00)	NUNS Lady Bullpups	3–0	UST Junior Tigresses	Filoil Flying V Centre, San Juan City
December 4; 4:00 PM (UTC +8:00)	(25–17, 25–19, 25–20)			Filoil Flying V Centre, San Juan City

=== Awards ===
UAAP Season 80 girls' volleyball champions
NUNS Lady Bullpups
Fourth title, fourth consecutive title

- Most valuable player (Season): Mhicaela Belen (NUNS Lady Bullpups)
- Most valuable player (Finals): Faith Janine Shirley Nisperos (NUNS Lady Bullpups)
- Rookie of the Year: Alyssa Jae Solomon (NUNS Lady Bullpups)
- First Best Outside Spiker: Faith Janine Shirley Nisperos (NUNS Lady Bullpups)
- Second Best Outside Spiker: Angel Canino (Zobel Junior Lady Archers)
- First Best Middle Blocker: Imee Kim Hernandez (UST Junior Tigresses)
- Second Best Middle Blocker: Alexis Miner (FEU–D Lady Baby Tamaraws)
- Best opposite spiker: Ejiya Laure (UST Junior Tigresses)
- Best setter: Joyme Cagande (NUNS Lady Bullpups)
- Best libero: Ma. Bernadette Pepito (UST Junior Tigresses)
- Best server: Justine Jazareno (Zobel Junior Lady Archers)

== Overall championship points ==
=== Seniors' division ===
Team	Men	Women	Total
NU Bulldogs	15	8	23
Ateneo Blue Eagles	12	10	22
FEU Tamaraws	10	12	22
De La Salle Green Archers	4	15	19
Adamson Soaring Falcons	6	6	12
UST Growling Tigers	8	2	10
UP Fighting Maroons	2	4	6
UE Red Warriors	1	1	2

=== Juniors' division ===
Team	Boys'	Girls'	Points
UST Tiger Cubs	15	12	27
NUNS Bullpups	10	15	25
FEU–D Baby Tamaraws	12	8	20
Zobel Junior Archers	6	10	16
UE Junior Red Warriors	8	4	12
Adamson Baby Falcons	2	6	8
Ateneo Blue Eaglets	4	—	4
UPIS Junior Fighting Maroons	1	2	3

Pts.	Ranking
15	Champion
12	2nd
10	3rd
8	4th
6	5th
4	6th
2	7th
1	8th
—	Did not join

In case of a tie, the team with the higher position in any tournament is ranked higher. If both are still tied, they are listed by alphabetical order.

How rankings are determined:

- Ranks 5th to 8th determined by elimination round standings.
- Loser of the #1 vs #4 semifinal match-up is ranked 4th
- Loser of the #2 vs #3 semifinal match-up is ranked 3rd
- Loser of the finals is ranked 2nd
- Champion is ranked 1st

Preceded by Season 79 (2017)	UAAP volleyball tournaments Season 80 (2018)	Succeeded by Season 81 (2019)

== See also ==
- NCAA Season 93 volleyball tournaments
