= UAAP Season 81 volleyball tournaments =

High school volleyball tournament

UAAP Season 81 Volleyball
- Host school: National University
Men's Finals	G1	G2	Wins
NU Bulldogs	3	3	2
FEU Tamaraws	1	1	0
- Duration: May 11–15, 2019
- Arena(s): Smart Araneta Coliseum, Mall of Asia Arena
- Finals MVP: Bryan Bagunas
- Winning coach: Dante Alinsunurin
- Semifinalists: Ateneo Blue Eagles; Adamson Soaring Falcons
Women's Finals	G1	G2	G3	Wins
Ateneo Lady Eagles	0	3	3	2
UST Growling Tigresses	3	1	0	1
- Duration: May 11–18, 2019
- Arena(s): Smart Araneta Coliseum, Mall of Asia Arena
- Finals MVP: Bea de Leon
- Winning coach: Oliver Almadro
- Semifinalists: De La Salle Lady Archers; FEU Lady Tamaraws
- TV network(s): ABS-CBN Sports+Action
Boys' Finals	G1	G2	Wins
NSNU Bullpups	3	3	2
FEU–D Baby Tamaraws	1	0	0
- Duration: December 9–12, 2018
- Arena(s): Filoil Flying V Centre
- Finals MVP: Mac Arvin Bandola
- Winning coach: Edgar Barroga
- Semifinalists: UST Tiger Cubs; Adamson Baby Falcons
Girls' Finals	G1	G2	Wins
NSNU Lady Bullpups	2	2	0
DLSZ Junior Lady Archers	3	3	2
- Duration: December 5–9, 2018
- Arena(s): Filoil Flying V Centre
- Finals MVP: Justine Jazareno
- Winning coach: Tina Salak
- Semifinalists: UST Golden Tigress Cubs; Adamson Lady Baby Falcons

The UAAP Season 81 volleyball tournaments started on October 31, 2018, with the junior tournaments and on February 16, 2019, for the senior tournaments. The games were played at the Filoil Flying V Centre, Mall of Asia Arena, Smart Araneta Coliseum and the Blue Eagle Gym. It is also sub-hosted by Far Eastern University.

== Teams ==
All eight member universities of the UAAP fielded teams in all three divisions.

University	Men's team	Women's team	Boys' team	Girls' Team
Adamson University	Soaring Falcons	Lady Falcons	Baby Falcons	Lady Baby Falcons
Ateneo de Manila University	Blue Eagles	Lady Eagles	Blue Eaglets	No team
De La Salle University	Green Spikers	Lady Spikers	Junior Archers	Junior Lady Archers
Far Eastern University	Tamaraws	Lady Tamaraws	Baby Tamaraws	Lady Baby Tamaraws
National University	Bulldogs	Lady Bulldogs	Bullpups	Lady Bullpups
University of the East	Red Warriors	Lady Warriors	Junior Warriors	Junior Lady Warriors
University of the Philippines Diliman	Fighting Maroons	Lady Maroons	Junior Maroons	Junior Lady Maroons
University of Santo Tomas	Growling Tigers	Golden Tigresses	Tiger Cubs	Golden Tigress Cubs

=== Coaches ===
University	Men's coach	Women's coach	Boys' coach	Girls' Coach
Adamson University	Domingo Custodio	Rogelio Getigan	Marvin Ramoso	Rogelio Getigan
Ateneo de Manila University	Timothy Sto. Tomas	Oliver Almadro	John Paul Pareja	No team
De La Salle University	Arnold Laniog	Ramil De Jesus	Michael Carino	Tina Salak
Far Eastern University	Rey Diaz	George Pascua	Rodrigo Del Rosario	Rodrigo Del Rosario
National University	Dante Alinsunurin	Norman Miguel	Edgar Barroga	Raymund Castillo
University of the East	Victor Turing IV	Ray Karl Dimaculangan	Raffy Monsuela	Chris Dimaculangan
University of the Philippines Diliman	Hans Chuacuco	Godfrey Okumu	Hans Chuacuco	Andy Fiel
University of Santo Tomas	Arthur Alan Mamon	Emilio Reyes	Clarence Esteban	Emilio Reyes

=== Coaching changes ===
Team	Outgoing coach	Manner of departure	Date	Replaced by	Date
Ateneo Blue Eagles	Oliver Almadro	Assigned to Women's Team	May 18, 2018	Timothy Sto. Tomas	June 14, 2018
De La Salle Green Archers	Norman Miguel	Signed with NU Lady Bulldogs	January 2, 2019	Arnold Laniog	January 3, 2019
Ateneo Lady Eagles	Tai Bundit	Expired contract	April 21, 2018	Oliver Almadro	May 18, 2018
UE Lady Warriors	Rod Roque	Stepped down	April 15, 2018	Ray Karl Dimaculangan	April 15, 2018
NU Lady Bulldogs	Raymund Castillo	Fired	January 2, 2019	Norman Miguel	January 2, 2019
Adamson Lady Falcons	Airess Padda	Assigned as Conditioning Coach	March 1, 2019	Rogelio Getigan	March 1, 2019

== Men's tournament ==
=== Team line-up ===
Team line-up

Adamson Soaring Falcons
No.	Name	Position
1	AMBURGO, Lenard Frans	S
2	DELA CRUZ, Archie	
3	MIRANDA, Lheo	OH
4	BELLO, Royce	MB
5	GARCIA, Mark Edcel	
6	JIMENEZ, Carlo	S
7	GUDOY, Jadewin	OP
8	PABLICO, Paolo (c)	OH
9	VALDEZ, Jesus	L
10	ALVAREZ, Mark	MB
11	NUGUID, John Philip	OP
12	HERNANDEZ, Alecson	L
13	LABANG, George Jr.	OP
14	ALICANDO, Jeffrey	MB
	CUSTODIO, Domingo	HC

Ateneo Blue Eagles
No.	Name	Position
1	MAGADIA, Lawrence Gil	S
2	AGUILAR, Kurt Michael	OP
3	MEDALLA, Ron Adrian	OH
5	TAN, Jasper Rodney (c)	MB
6	MORADO, Ariel Jr	S
8	LIGOT, Luis Alonzo Martin	
9	KOYFMAN, Antony Paul	OP
10	TRINIDAD, Paulo Lorenzo	OP
11	LLENOS, Canciano	OH
12	NJIGHA, Chumason Celestine	MB
13	SUMANGUID, Manuel III	L
16	GLORIOSO, Gian Carlo	MB
17	CUERVA, Sebastian Enrique	OH
18	RIVERA, Ishmael John	OH
	STO. TOMAS, Timothy James	HC

De La Salle Green Spikers
No.	Name	Position
1	REYES, Keiffer Arvex	MB
2	MACASPAC, Rafael	L
3	ANIMA, Billie-Jean Henri	OH
4	BALANONG, Gibson	
5	DELOS REYES, John David	MB
6	SUMALINOG, John Raphael	L
7	DUMAGO, Cris Bernard	OH
8	AQUINO, Ashberry John	
9	MARCO, Wayne Ferdi	S
11	SERRANO, Angel Paul	S
12	LLIGE, Rhian Ozzie	OH
13	INOCENTES, John David	OH
14	BACON, Geraint Bell	OP
16	DE JESUS, Gian Edrei	OP
	LANIOG, Arnold	HC

FEU Tamaraws
No.	Name	Position
1	BARRICA, Jeremiah	L
2	SOLIS, Richard (c)	OP
3	SILANG, Kris Cian	S
4	SUAREZ, Owen Jaime	S
5	DE ASIS, Reco	OP
6	CALADO, Mark Frederick	OH
7	GARCIA, Jude	OH
8	BUGAOAN, John Paul	MB
9	LORENZO, Vince Patrick	L
10	PALER, Redi John	OH
11	PADON, Sean Victor	
12	SALABSAB, John Paul	OH
14	FERNANDEZ, Clark	
15	QUIEL, Peter John	MB
	DIAZ, Reynaldo Jr	HC

NU Bulldogs
No.	Name	Position
1	BAGUNAS, Bryan	OH
2	ANCHETA, Jann Paulo	S
5	PONTI, Krisvan	
6	MONDERO, Banjo	OH
7	ALMENDRAS, Angelo Nicolas	OP
9	NATIVIDAD, James Martin	OH
12	SAURA, Francis Philip (c)	MB
13	RETAMAR, Ave Joshua	S
14	DAYMIL, Berhashidin	MB
15	MARCOS, Ricky	L
16	MALABUNGA, Kim	MB
17	GAMPONG, Madzlan	OP
19	MACLANG, Marco Ely	L
	ALINSUNURIN, Dante	HC

UE Red Warriors
No.	Name	Position
1	ABALON, Al-Jhon	OH
2	IMPERIAL, Ralph Ryan	S
3	ADRIANO, Kim	OP
4	CACAYAN, Mori	MB
5	REYES, Jose Marie	OH
6	MEDINA, John Lester	L
7	IMPERIAL, Adrian Rafael	S
8	ALBA, Angelu Noel (c)	MB
9	SOLIS, Aldwin	L
10	BONOAN, Bryan Ross	OH
11	JOASAFAT, Lloyd	MB
12	ORTEGA, Geric Rodmar	OH
13	ERNACIO, Danilo Jr	OP
18	INOFERIO, Clifford	OH
	VICTORIO, Turing IV	HC

UP Fighting Maroons
No.	Name	Position
1	BALDELOVAR, Jerahmeel (c)	S
2	ENTERIA, Bryan Christian	OP
3	CONSUELO, Nicolo Brylle	MB
4	CASTILLO, John Mark Joshua	MB
5	EVARISTO, Julian Miguel	
6	SAN PEDRO, Jerry Earl Jr.	OP
7	NASOL, John Miguel	L
8	FORTES, Joshua Emmanuel	OH
9	MADRIGALEJOS, John Carlo	L
12	MILLETE, John Mark	OH
13	IJIRAN, Ruskin Joss	OH
14	YAN, Martin David	S
15	ILAO, John Stephen	OH
18	SAN PASCUAL, Gian Kyle	MB
	CHUACOCO, Hans	HC

UST Growling Tigers
No.	Name	Position
1	SAWAL, Lester Kim	L
2	VALENZUELA, Vyxen Vaughn	MB
3	TAJANLANGIT, Jerald David	
4	REQUINTON, Jaron	MB/OP
6	CASILLAN, Aldous Darcy	S
7	SUMAGAYSAY, Jayvee	MB
9	TAJANLANGIT, Timothy James	S
10	MEDINA, Manuel Andrei (c)	OH
11	UMANDAL, Joshua	OH
12	CORDA, Hernel Gem	MB
13	MENDIOLLA, Jelex Jay	L
14	BURO, Juren Jireh	OP
15	DEL ROSARIO, Josh Robert	OP
16	CARODAN, Tyrone Jan	MB
	MAMON, Arthur Alan	HC

Legend
S	Setter
MB	Middle Blocker
OH	Outside Hitter
OP	Opposite Hitter
L	Libero
(c)	Team Captain
HC	Head coach

=== Elimination round ===
==== Team standings ====
Pos	Team	Pld	W	L	Pts	SW	SL	SR	SPW	SPL	SPR	Qualification
1	NU Bulldogs (H)	14	13	1	38	39	6	6.500	1079	855	1.262	Twice-to-beat in the semifinals
2	FEU Tamaraws	14	11	3	32	36	16	2.250	1208	1042	1.159	Twice-to-beat in the semifinals
3	Ateneo Blue Eagles	14	10	4	33	36	16	2.250	1225	1098	1.116	Twice-to-win in the semifinals
4	Adamson Soaring Falcons	14	9	5	24	27	25	1.080	1175	1140	1.031	Twice-to-win in the semifinals
5	UST Growling Tigers	14	5	9	18 (Note: Head-to-head record: UST 1–1 La Salle; UST +5)	25	32	0.781	1231	1259	0.978	
6	De La Salle Green Archers	14	5	9	13	18	32	0.563	1068	1159	0.921	
7	UE Red Warriors	14	2	12	7	12	39	0.308	982	1210	0.812	
8	UP Fighting Maroons	14	1	13	3	14	41	0.341	1104	1309	0.843	

Source: ABS-CBN Sports
Rules for classification: 1) number of wins; 2) if tied for #2 or #4, one-game playoff; 3) match points; 4) sets ratio; 5) points ratio; 6) head-to-head record
(H) Host

==== Match-up results ====
	Round 1							Round 2						
Team ╲ Game	1	2	3	4	5	6	7	8	9	10	11	12	13	14
AdU	UST school colors	La Salle school colors	UE school colors	NU school colors	FEU school colors	Ateneo school colors	UP school colors	NU school colors	UP school colors	FEU school colors	UST school colors	UE school colors	La Salle school colors	Ateneo school colors
AdMU	La Salle school colors	UST school colors	FEU school colors	UE school colors	UP school colors	Adamson school colors	NU school colors	FEU school colors	La Salle school colors	NU school colors	UP school colors	UST school colors	UE school colors	Adamson school colors
DLSU	Ateneo school colors	Adamson school colors	NU school colors	UP school colors	UST school colors	UE school colors	FEU school colors	UST school colors	Ateneo school colors	UE school colors	NU school colors	Adamson school colors	FEU school colors	UP school colors
FEU	NU school colors	UP school colors	Ateneo school colors	UST school colors	UE school colors	Adamson school colors	La Salle school colors	Ateneo school colors	UST school colors	Adamson school colors	UE school colors	UP school colors	La Salle school colors	NU school colors
NU	FEU school colors	UE school colors	La Salle school colors	Adamson school colors	UST school colors	UP school colors	Ateneo school colors	Adamson school colors	UE school colors	Ateneo school colors	La Salle school colors	UST school colors	UP school colors	FEU school colors
UE	UP school colors	NU school colors	Adamson school colors	Ateneo school colors	FEU school colors	La Salle school colors	UST school colors	UP school colors	NU school colors	La Salle school colors	FEU school colors	Adamson school colors	Ateneo school colors	UST school colors
UP	UE school colors	FEU school colors	UST school colors	La Salle school colors	Ateneo school colors	NU school colors	Adamson school colors	UE school colors	Adamson school colors	UST school colors	Ateneo school colors	FEU school colors	NU school colors	La Salle school colors
UST	Adamson school colors	Ateneo school colors	UP school colors	FEU school colors	La Salle school colors	NU school colors	UE school colors	La Salle school colors	FEU school colors	UP school colors	Adamson school colors	Ateneo school colors	NU school colors	UE school colors

Source: ABS-CBN Sports
= Win; = Loss

==== Game results ====
Results on top and to the right of the gray cells are for first-round games; those to the bottom and to the left of it are second-round games.

Team	AdU	AdMU	DLSU	FEU	NU	UE	UP	UST
Adamson		0–3	3–1	0–3	0–3	3–0	3–1	3–2
Ateneo	3–0		3–0	2–3	0–3	3–0	3–1	2–3
La Salle	1–3	0–3		0–3	1–3	3–2	3–0	0–3
FEU	2–3	1–3	3–0		3–0	3–0	3–1	3–2
NU	3–0	3–2	3–0	3–0		3–0	3–0	3–0
UE	0–3	1–3	0–3	0–3	0–3		3–1	3–2
UP	1–3	1–3	2–3	1–3	0–3	3–2		1–3
UST	2–3	0–3	1–3	1–3	0–3	3–1	3–1	

Source: ABS-CBN Sports
Legend: Blue = left column team win; Red = top row team win.

=== Playoffs ===
Semifinals (Nos. 1 & 2 have twice-to-beat advantage)
1	NU	3
4	Adamson	0
2	FEU	3
3	Ateneo	1

Finals (Best-of-three series)
1	NU	3	3
2	FEU	1	1

=== Semifinals ===
NU vs Adamson NU with twice-to-beat advantage.
Elimination round results:

- (Mar 3) NU def. Adamson 3–0 • 25–22, 25–18, 25–16
- (Mar 20) NU def. Adamson 3–0 • 25–18, 25–18, 25–19

May 5, 2019; 12:00 PM (UTC +8:00)	NU Bulldogs	3–0	Adamson Soaring Falcons	MOA Arena, Pasay; Attendance: 740; Referees: Bobby Celso (NR) and Fernando Velarde (NR)
May 5, 2019; 12:00 PM (UTC +8:00)	(25–19, 25–16, 25–20); P–2			MOA Arena, Pasay; Attendance: 740; Referees: Bobby Celso (NR) and Fernando Velarde (NR)

FEU vs Ateneo FEU with twice-to-beat advantage.
Elimination round results:

- (Feb 24) FEU def. Ateneo 3–2 • 20–25, 25–22, 25–22, 20–25, 16–14
- (Mar 20) Ateneo def. FEU 3–1 • 31–29, 22–25, 25–23, 26–24

May 4, 2019; 2:00 PM (UTC +8:00)	FEU Tamaraws	3–1	Ateneo Blue Eagles	MOA Arena, Pasay; Attendance: 5,000; Referees: Rene Gaspillo (NR) and Philip Nunez (NR)
May 4, 2019; 2:00 PM (UTC +8:00)	(21–25, 25–23, 25–22, 25–22); P–2			MOA Arena, Pasay; Attendance: 5,000; Referees: Rene Gaspillo (NR) and Philip Nunez (NR)

=== Finals ===
NU vs FEU Best-of-three series.
Elimination round results:

- (Feb 16) FEU def. NU 3–0 • 25–12, 25–18, 25–17
- (Apr 28) NU def. FEU 3–0 • 25–13, 25–23, 25–18

May 11, 2019; 12:00 PM (UTC +8:00)	NU Bulldogs	3–1	FEU Tamaraws	Smart Araneta Coliseum, Quezon City; Attendance: 720; Referees: Bobby Celso (NR) and Angelo Haw (NR)
May 11, 2019; 12:00 PM (UTC +8:00)	(21–25, 25–23, 25–23, 25–18); P–2			Smart Araneta Coliseum, Quezon City; Attendance: 720; Referees: Bobby Celso (NR) and Angelo Haw (NR)

May 15, 2019; 12:00 PM (UTC +8:00)	NU Bulldogs	3–1	FEU Tamaraws	MOA Arena, Pasay; Attendance: 2,800; Referees: Rene Gaspillo (NR) and Philip Nunez (NR)
May 15, 2019; 12:00 PM (UTC +8:00)	(24–26, 25–23, 25–23, 25–19); P–2			MOA Arena, Pasay; Attendance: 2,800; Referees: Rene Gaspillo (NR) and Philip Nunez (NR)

=== Awards ===
UAAP Season 81 men's volleyball champions
NU Bulldogs
Fourth title, second consecutive title

- Most valuable player (Season): Bryan Bagunas (NU Bulldogs)
- Most valuable player (Finals): Bryan Bagunas (NU Bulldogs)
- Rookie of the Year: Angelo Nicolas Almendras (NU Bulldogs)
- First Best Outside Spiker: Bryan Bagunas (NU Bulldogs)
- Second Best Outside Spiker: Jude Garcia (FEU Tamaraws)
- First Best Middle Blocker: John Paul Bugaoan (FEU Tamaraws)
- Second Best Middle Blocker: Chumason Celestine Njigha (Ateneo Blue Eagles)
- Best opposite spiker: James Martin Natividad (NU Bulldogs)
- Best setter: Lawrence Gil Magadia (Ateneo Blue Eagles)
- Best libero: Manuel Sumanguid III (Ateneo Blue Eagles)
- Best server: Bryan Bagunas (NU Bulldogs)

== Women's tournament ==
=== Team line-up ===
Adamson Lady Falcons
No.	Name	Position
1	YANDOC, Nikka Sophia	S
2	GENESIS, Trisha Mae	OH
3	FLORA, Bernadette	OH
5	DACORON, Mary Joy	MB
6	PINAR, Ceasa Joria	OP
7	MACASLANG, Krich Aesheluoz	MB
9	PERMENTILLA, Chiara May	OH
10	PEREZ, Lea-Ann	MB
11	IGAO, Mary Jane	S
13	SOYUD, Christine Joy (c)	OP
14	PONCE, Tonnie Rose	L
15	INFANTE, Hanna Nicole	L
17	AVE, Gracelchen	OP
18	BALANG, Princess	L
	(MATCH 1–3) PADDA, Airess Star	Former; Coach
	GETIGAN, Onyok	HC

Ateneo Lady Eagles
No.	Name	Position
1	RAVENA, Princess Danielle Theris	L
3	WONG, Maria Deanna Izabella	S
4	SAMONTE, Julianne Marie	OH
5	GANDLER, Vanessa	OH
6	MARAGUINOT, Janel	S
7	MADAYAG, Madeleine Yrenea	MB
9	GASTON, Pauline Marie Monique	OH
10	TOLENTINO, Katrina Mae	OP
11	RAAGAS, Erika	OP
12	GEQUILLANA, Candice	OH
14	DE LEON, Isabel Beatriz (c)	MB
17	FURUKAWA, Ayumi	DS
18	GEQUILLANA, Kassandra Miren	L
21	DELOS REYES, Jeycel Ann	MB
	ALMADRO, Oliver	HC

De La Salle Lady Spikers
No.	Name	Position
2	CHENG, Desiree Wynea (c)	OH
4	NOMIL, Ferlyn	L
5	CLEMENTE, Maria Lourdes	MB
6	COBB, Michelle Monique	S
7	LUNA, May	OH
8	DELA CRUZ, Jolina	OP
9	INSTRELLA, Rovena Andrea	OP
11	ALBA, Marionne Angelique	S
12	SAGA, Carmel June	L
13	OGUNSANYA, Aduke Christine	MB
15	TIAMZON, Ernestine Grace	OP
16	IPAC, Norielle	MB
17	HATULAN, Ynna Nicole Angela	MB
18	SANTOS, Erika Mae	OH
	DE JESUS, Ramil	HC

FEU Lady Tamaraws
No.	Name	Position
1	HERNANDEZ, Carlota	OH
2	EBON, Lycha	OP
4	GUINO-O, Heather Anne	OH
5	DUREMDES, Ria Beatriz Glenell	L
6	AGUDO, Ivanna Marie	OH
7	RONQUILLO, France Elize	OH
8	CAYUNA, Maria Angelica	S
10	MORA, Mary Martha Louise	
11	BAUTISTA, Angelica	L
12	NEGRITO, Kyle Angela	S
13	DOMINGO, Celine Elaiza	MB
14	CARANDANG, Czarina Grace	MB
15	MALABANAN, Jerrili (c)	OH
16	VILLAREAL, Jeanette Virginia	MB
	PASCUA, George	HC

NU Lady Bulldogs
No.	Name	Position
2	ORILLANEDA, Mary Klymince	OH
3	LANDICHO, Mary Antonette	MB
6	CAGANDE, Joyme	S
7	ROBLES, Princess Anne	OH
8	CHAVEZ, Joni Anne Kamille	L
9	NIERVA, Jennifer	L
10	CLOZA, Elaine	
11	DORIA, Roselyn (c)	MB
12	LUCEÑO, Gelina Mae	MB
15	PARAN, Audrey Kathryn	OP
16	LACSINA, Ivy	OH
	MIGUEL, Norman	HC

UE Lady Warriors
No.	Name	Position
1	ABIL, Judith	OH
2	CLAVANO, Lhara Mae	S
3	GABARDA, Mariella	MB
4	MENDREZ, Mary Anne	OH
5	ARADO, Kathleen Faith	L
7	RODRIGUEZ, Seth Marione	MB
8	OLARVE, Zilfa Geline	OP
9	STA. MARIA, Jana Katrina	MB
10	BABOL, Jasckin Mae	L
12	BALITON, Roselle (c)	MB
14	BENDONG, Laizah Ann	S
15	ALCAYDE, Jasmine Gayle	OP
17	SANTOS, Remcel Joyce	MB
18	MANABAT, Mialyn	OP
	DIMACULANGAN, Karl	HC

UP Lady Maroons
No.	Name	Position
1	SOTOMIL, Marianne	S
2	BERNARDO, Lorie Lyn	MB
3	LAYUG, Maristella Genn	MB
4	ALTOMEA, Remelyn	L
7	SANDOVAL, Caryl	OH
9	RAMOS, Jessma Clarice	MB
10	MOLDE, Maria Lina Isabel	OH
11	BUITRE, Marian Alisa	MB
13	DOROG, Justine	OH
14	GANNABAN, Aieshalaine	MB
15	BAUTISTA, Mary Mirgie	L
17	ESTRAÑERO, Maria Arielle	S
18	CARLOS, Diana Mae (c)	OP/OH
19	ROSIER, Roselyn	OP
	OKUMU, Godfrey	HC

UST Growling Tigresses
No.	Name	Position
2	TUAZON, Donna May	MB
3	JIMENEZ, Ysabel Jamie	OP
4	VIRAY, Caitlyn	MB
6	ALESSANDRINI, Milena	OH
7	PACRES, Mary Dominique	OP
8	LAURE, Ejiya	OP
11	BICAR, Alina Joyce	S
12	GALDONES, Kecelyn	MB
15	ROLDAN, Rachelle	OH
16	RONDINA, Cherry Ann (c)	OH
17	DELERIO, Janel	L
18	RIVERA, Rica Jane	L
19	BALCORTA, Janine Kyla	MB
20	GALANZA, Maria Fe	S
	REYES, Emilio Jr.	HC

Legend
S	Setter
MB	Middle Blocker
OH	Outside Hitter
OP	Opposite Hitter
L	Libero
DS	Defensive Specialist
(c)	Team Captain
HC	Head coach

=== Elimination round ===
==== Team standings ====
Pos	Team	Pld	W	L	Pts	SW	SL	SR	SPW	SPL	SPR	Qualification
1	Ateneo Lady Eagles	14	12	2	34	37	14	2.643	1177	1018	1.156	Twice-to-beat in the semifinals
2	UST Growling Tigresses	14	10	4	30 (Note: Second-seed playoff: UST 3–1 La Salle)	35	17	2.059	1230	1072	1.147	Twice-to-beat in the semifinals
3	De La Salle Lady Archers	14	10	4	32	34	15	2.267	1137	973	1.169	Twice-to-win in the semifinals
4	FEU Lady Tamaraws	14	9	5	23	30	28	1.071	1240	1240	1.000	Twice-to-win in the semifinals
5	UP Lady Maroons	14	6	8	17	24	32	0.750	1228	1222	1.005	
6	NU Lady Bulldogs (H)	14	4	10	10	19	35	0.543	1112	1288	0.863	
7	UE Lady Warriors	14	3	11	13	17	35	0.486	1057	1177	0.898	
8	Adamson Lady Falcons	14	2	12	9	16	36	0.444	1043	1234	0.845	

Source: ABS-CBN Sports
Rules for classification: 1) number of wins; 2) if tied for #2 or #4, one-game playoff; 3) match points; 4) sets ratio; 5) points ratio; 6) head-to-head record
(H) Host

==== Match-up results ====
	Round 1							Round 2						
Team ╲ Game	1	2	3	4	5	6	7	8	9	10	11	12	13	14
AdU	UST school colors	La Salle school colors	UE school colors	NU school colors	FEU school colors	Ateneo school colors	UP school colors	FEU school colors	UST school colors	NU school colors	La Salle school colors	UE school colors	Ateneo school colors	UP school colors
AdMU	La Salle school colors	UST school colors	FEU school colors	UE school colors	UP school colors	Adamson school colors	NU school colors	UST school colors	UP school colors	FEU school colors	NU school colors	La Salle school colors	Adamson school colors	UE school colors
DLSU	Ateneo school colors	Adamson school colors	NU school colors	UP school colors	UST school colors	UE school colors	FEU school colors	UP school colors	NU school colors	UST school colors	Adamson school colors	Ateneo school colors	UE school colors	FEU school colors
FEU	NU school colors	UP school colors	Ateneo school colors	UST school colors	UE school colors	Adamson school colors	La Salle school colors	Adamson school colors	UE school colors	Ateneo school colors	UP school colors	NU school colors	UST school colors	La Salle school colors
NU	FEU school colors	UE school colors	La Salle school colors	Adamson school colors	UST school colors	UP school colors	Ateneo school colors	UE school colors	La Salle school colors	Adamson school colors	Ateneo school colors	FEU school colors	UP school colors	UST school colors
UE	UP school colors	NU school colors	Adamson school colors	Ateneo school colors	FEU school colors	La Salle school colors	UST school colors	NU school colors	FEU school colors	UP school colors	UST school colors	Adamson school colors	La Salle school colors	Ateneo school colors
UP	UE school colors	FEU school colors	UST school colors	La Salle school colors	Ateneo school colors	NU school colors	Adamson school colors	La Salle school colors	Ateneo school colors	UE school colors	FEU school colors	UST school colors	NU school colors	Adamson school colors
UST	Adamson school colors	Ateneo school colors	UP school colors	FEU school colors	La Salle school colors	NU school colors	UE school colors	Ateneo school colors	Adamson school colors	La Salle school colors	UE school colors	UP school colors	FEU school colors	NU school colors

Source: ABS-CBN Sports
= Win; = Loss

==== Game results ====
Results on top and to the right of the gray cells are for first-round games; those to the bottom and to the left of it are second-round games.

Team	AdU	ADMU	DLSU	FEU	NU	UE	UP	UST
Adamson		1–3	0–3	2–3	3–0	1–3	1–3	2–3
Ateneo	3–0		1–3	3–2	3–1	3–0	3–0	3–1
La Salle	3–0	3–0		3–0	3–1	3–0	2–3	0–3
FEU	3–2	0–3	3–2		3–1	3–2	1–3	3–1
NU	3–1	1–3	0–3	0–3		3–0	3–2	1–3
UE	3–0	0–3	0–3	2–3	3–1		2–3	0–3
UP	0–3	0–3	3–0	1–3	2–3	3–2		1–3
UST	3–0	2–3	1–3	3–0	3–1	3–0	3–0	

Source: ABS-CBN Sports
Legend: Blue = left column team win; Red = top row team win.

=== Playoffs ===
2nd-seed playoff
3	La Salle	1
4	UST	3

Semifinals; Top seeds twice-to-beat
1	Ateneo	2	3
4	FEU	3	1
2	UST	3
3	La Salle	2

Finals; Best-of-three series
1	Ateneo	0	3	3
2	UST	3	1	0

=== Second-seed playoff ===
May 1, 2019; 3:30 PM (UTC +8:00)	De La Salle Lady Archers	1–3	UST Growling Tigresses	Filoil Flying V Centre, San Juan City; Attendance: 5,001; Referees: Mary Joy De Imus (NR) and Angelo Haw (NR)
May 1, 2019; 3:30 PM (UTC +8:00)	(14–25, 23–25, 25–23, 19–25)			Filoil Flying V Centre, San Juan City; Attendance: 5,001; Referees: Mary Joy De Imus (NR) and Angelo Haw (NR)

=== Semifinals ===
Ateneo vs FEU Ateneo with twice-to-beat advantage.
Elimination round results:

- (Feb 24) Ateneo def. FEU 3–2 • 14–25, 19–25, 25–21, 25–21, 15–12
- (Apr 3) Ateneo def. FEU 3–0 • 25–21, 25–10, 25–18

May 4, 2019; 4:00 PM (UTC +8:00)	Ateneo Lady Eagles	2–3	FEU Lady Tamaraws	MOA Arena, Pasay; Attendance: 11,141; Referees: James Oliver Mora (NR) and Roberto Javier (NR)
May 4, 2019; 4:00 PM (UTC +8:00)	(25–10, 23–25, 22–25, 25–12, 8–15)			MOA Arena, Pasay; Attendance: 11,141; Referees: James Oliver Mora (NR) and Roberto Javier (NR)

May 8, 2019; 3:30 PM (UTC +8:00)	Ateneo Lady Eagles	3–1	FEU Lady Tamaraws	Filoil Flying V Centre, San Juan City; Attendance: 5,267; Referees: Rene Gaspillo (NR) and Erlindo Eusebio (NR)
May 8, 2019; 3:30 PM (UTC +8:00)	(25–20, 21–25, 25–23, 25–14)			Filoil Flying V Centre, San Juan City; Attendance: 5,267; Referees: Rene Gaspillo (NR) and Erlindo Eusebio (NR)

UST vs La Salle UST with twice-to-beat advantage.
Elimination round results:

- (Mar 6) UST def. La Salle 3–0 • 25–20, 25–22, 25–16
- (Mar 31) La Salle def. UST 3–1 • 21–25, 25–23, 25–19, 26–24

May 5, 2019; 4:00 PM (UTC +8:00)	UST Growling Tigresses	3–2	De La Salle Lady Archers	MOA Arena, Pasay; Attendance: 14,726; Referees: Erlindo Eusebio (NR) and Rene Gaspillo (NR)
May 5, 2019; 4:00 PM (UTC +8:00)	(25–19, 25–19, 20–25, 23–25, 15–10)			MOA Arena, Pasay; Attendance: 14,726; Referees: Erlindo Eusebio (NR) and Rene Gaspillo (NR)

=== Finals ===
Ateneo vs UST Best-of-three series.
Elimination round results:

- (Feb 20) Ateneo def. UST 3–1 • 25–21, 25–18, 16–25, 25–22
- (Mar 20) Ateneo def. UST 3–2 • 19–25, 22–25, 27–25, 25–22, 15–11

May 11, 2019; 4:00 PM (UTC +8:00)	Ateneo Lady Eagles	0–3	UST Growling Tigresses	Smart Araneta Coliseum, Quezon City; Attendance: 17,682; Referees: Rene Gaspillo (NR) and Erlindo Eusebio (NR)
May 11, 2019; 4:00 PM (UTC +8:00)	(17–25, 16–25, 20–25)			Smart Araneta Coliseum, Quezon City; Attendance: 17,682; Referees: Rene Gaspillo (NR) and Erlindo Eusebio (NR)

May 15, 2019; 4:00 PM (UTC +8:00)	Ateneo Lady Eagles	3–1	UST Growling Tigresses	MOA Arena, Pasay; Referees: Erlindo Eusebio (NR) and Mary Joy De Imus (NR)
May 15, 2019; 4:00 PM (UTC +8:00)	(26–24, 14–25, 25–21, 25–15)			MOA Arena, Pasay; Referees: Erlindo Eusebio (NR) and Mary Joy De Imus (NR)

May 18, 2019; 4:00 PM (UTC +8:00)	Ateneo Lady Eagles	3–0	UST Growling Tigresses	MOA Arena, Pasay; Attendance: 21,347; Referees: Rene Gaspillo (NR) and James Oliver Mora (NR)
May 18, 2019; 4:00 PM (UTC +8:00)	(25–17, 25–22, 25–22)			MOA Arena, Pasay; Attendance: 21,347; Referees: Rene Gaspillo (NR) and James Oliver Mora (NR)

=== Awards ===
UAAP Season 81 women's volleyball champions
Ateneo Lady Eagles
Third title

- Most valuable player (Season): Sisi Rondina (UST Growling Tigresses)
- Most valuable player (Finals): Isabel Beatriz De Leon (Ateneo Lady Eagles)
- Rookie of the Year: Ejiya Laure (UST Growling Tigresses)
- First Best Outside Spiker: Ejiya Laure (UST Growling Tigresses)
- Second Best Outside Spiker: Sisi Rondina (UST Growling Tigresses)
- First Best Middle Blocker: Roselyn Doria (NU Lady Bulldogs)
- Second Best Middle Blocker: Madeleine Yrenea Madayag (Ateneo Lady Eagles)
- Best opposite spiker: Katrina Mae Tolentino (Ateneo Lady Eagles)
- Best setter: Laizah Ann Bendong (UE Lady Warriors)
- Best libero: Kath Arado (UE Lady Warriors)
- Best server: Princess Anne Robles (NU Lady Bulldogs)

==== Players of the Week ====
Week ending	Player	Team	Ref.
February 18	Maria Lina Isabel Molde	UP Lady Maroons	
February 25	Katrina Mae Tolentino	Ateneo Lady Eagles	
March 4	Diana Mae Carlos	UP Lady Maroons	
March 11	Ejiya Laure	UST Growling Tigresses	
March 18	Isabel Beatriz de Leon	Ateneo Lady Eagles	
March 25	Madeleine Yrenea Madayag	Ateneo Lady Eagles	
April 1	Desiree Wynea Cheng	De La Salle Lady Archers	
April 8	Katrina Mae Tolentino	Ateneo Lady Eagles	
April 15	Sisi Rondina	UST Growling Tigresses	
April 28	Heather Anne Guino-o	FEU Lady Tamaraws	

== Boys' tournament ==
The UAAP Season 81 high school volleyball tournament started on October 13, 2018, at the Blue Eagle Gym. Tournament host for the juniors is the Far Eastern University.

=== Team line-up ===
Adamson Baby Falcons
No.	Name	Position
1	AGUILAR, Jude Christian	
2	LAZAM, Aljon Ian	L
4	BIHAG, Mark Vin	
5	MOLINA, Gabriel	
6	GAWARAN, Alec	
7	TAKEDA, Jhon Maru	L
8	JABOLI, Leonard Vin (c)	
9	ENGAY, Renz Angelo	
10	DEL PILAR, Nathaniel	
11	DOMINGO, Lourenz	S
12	ANDAYA, John Michael	
13	MONTEMAYOR, Mark	
16	NOVILLO, Evander	
18	LABOG, Vincent	
	RAMOSO, Marvin	HC

Ateneo Blue Eaglets
No.	Name	Position
1	SUNDIANG, Javier Joaquin	
2	MENDOZA, Mikka Alexis	
4	CORDERO, Dominic Ronald	
7	SAMANIEGO, Gian Carlo	
8	BAHIA, Gabriel Robin (c)	S
9	ALMADRO, Abe Julian	
10	BABST, Evan Andre	
11	RIOS, Juan Francisco	
12	TANCHINGCO, Joshua Ignacio Luke	
14	SAN JUAN, Giulian Miguel	
15	ESTRELLA, Paolo Gabriel	
16	ALMADRO, Andrei John	
18	QUIJANO, Christian David	
20	FUENTES, John Matthew	
	PAREJA, John Paul	HC

Zobel Junior Archers
No.	Name	Position
1	ENCARNACION, Simon	
2	ARANTON, Enrique Miguel (c)	
3	VILLANUEVA, Francis Nino	
4	ROGELIO, Jezreel Danniele	
5	OSTERIA, Gil Bryann	S
6	SEYER, Arnaud Daniel	
7	ULANDAY, Cerwin	
9	BOCALAN, Earl Spencer	
10	ESPEJO, Andre	
11	FLORES, Robert II	L
12	LITUANIA, Jhon Exequiel	
13	CRISOSTOMO, Leinuel	L
14	DIMATULAC, Aaron Joseph	
15	PELIGORIO, Jose Michael	
	CARINO, Michael	HC

FEU–D Baby Tamaraws
No.	Name	Position
1	ABUNIAWAN, Jefferson	
2	CODILLA, Jomel	
3	FERRER, Mike Genesis	
5	BANAC, Mabel Jesus Jr.	L
7	JAVELONA, Jose Magdalino	
8	LOMIBAO, John Christopher	
9	DICHOSON, Jeek Vincent	
10	CAJOLO, Ranz Wesley	
11	GAVAN, R-vin Morris	
13	TUQUERO, Neuford	L
14	MARTINEZ, Benny (c)	S
15	DONHUINES, Justine Dave	
16	NIERVA, Michael Raymar	
18	CACAO, Ariel	
	DEL ROSARIO, Rodrigo	HC

NUNS Bullpups
No.	Name	Position
1	OCAMPO, Jomar	
2	FORTUNA, Michael John	
3	DE JESUS, Jules Carlo	
4	BANDOLA, Mac Arvin	
5	REYES, Reymart	
6	GUERRERO, Menard	L
8	POQUITA, Diogenes (c)	S
10	CRUZ, Lorence	
11	MANALO, Mark Andrei	
12	BELOSTRINO, Clarenz	
13	SALVADOR, Pol Gringo	
15	TUGAS, Jhone	
16	JALECO, Bryan Hames	
17	PIJO, Jann Mark	L
	BARROGA, Edgar	HC

UE Junior Red Warriors
No.	Name	Position
1	TORRES, Giles Jeffer	
2	HERBOSA, King Eduard	L
3	ABRIA, Jake	
5	BABON, Francis Lous	
6	APOLINARIO, John Michael (c)	S
7	PIELAGO, Jurgen Jae	
8	RAMIREZ, Dominique	
9	BALEAN, Reyden	
11	MANGAHIS, John Paul	
12	CABALLERO, Marc Joshua	L
14	MADRIGAL, Jose Antonio	
15	REYES, Angelo	
16	BELLO, Joseph Phillip	
18	REYES, Jayvee	
	MONSUELA, Raffy	HC

UPIS Junior Fighting Maroons
No.	Name	Position
1	BAYSA, Aldrin Jay	
2	GALANG, Elijah Israel	
3	SILVESTRE, Samuel	
4	MALINAO, Archie Kyle	L
5	CASTRO, Ron Yobhel (c)	
6	DAGUMAN, Dex Mikaelo	S
7	CAGUIAT, Louis Kenneth	
8	URGENA, John Derick	
9	BORJA, Brett Ashley	L
10	CASTRO, Juan Miguel	
12	CUNANAN, John Ivan	
13	REGALADO, Jade Dylan	
14	CRUZ, Emmanuel Joseph	
	CHUACUCO, Hans	HC

UST Tiger Cubs
No.	Name	Position
1	CAPARAS, Lance Harold	
2	SENORON, Jhun Lorenz (c)	
3	SOLIS, Julianne Miguel	S
4	VELASCO, Kenneth Christus	
5	DE VEGA, Rey Miguel	
6	NARCISO, Jose Gerardo	
8	SEGUI, Charles Jordan	L
9	AVILA, Joshua	
10	EUGENIO, Kyle Christian	
13	ADEVA, Jaycon	
16	BASILIO, Yvann Xoicthil	
17	CAWALING, Kenneth Miles Angelo	
18	PRUDENCIADO, Van Tracy	L
19	TRINIDAD, Gabriel Angelo	
	REYES, Emilio Jr.	HC

Legend
S	Setter
MB	Middle Blocker
OH	Outside Hitter
OP	Opposite Hitter
L	Libero
(c)	Team Captain
HC	Head coach

=== Elimination round ===
==== Team standings ====
Pos	Team	Pld	W	L	Pts	SW	SL	SR	SPW	SPL	SPR	Qualification
1	NUNS Bullpups	14	13	1	38	40	9	4.444	1214	903	1.344	Twice-to-beat in the semifinals
2	FEU–D Baby Tamaraws (H)	14	10	4	27 (Note: Second-seed playoff: FEU 3–2 UST)	31	20	1.550	1164	1007	1.156	Twice-to-beat in the semifinals
3	UST Tiger Cubs	14	10	4	30	34	16	2.125	1180	972	1.214	Twice-to-win in the semifinals
4	Adamson Baby Falcons	14	9	5	28	32	19	1.684	1161	1012	1.147	Twice-to-win in the semifinals
5	UE Junior Red Warriors	14	8	6	26	30	19	1.579	1072	1035	1.036	
6	Zobel Junior Archers	14	4	10	13	18	31	0.581	975	1089	0.895	
7	Ateneo Blue Eaglets	14	2	12	4	7	40	0.175	780	1135	0.687	
8	UPIS Junior Fighting Maroons	14	0	14	2	4	42	0.095	735	1128	0.652	

Source: ABS-CBN Sports
Rules for classification: 1) number of wins; 2) if tied for #2 or #4, one-game playoff; 3) match points; 4) sets ratio; 5) points ratio; 6) head-to-head record
(H) Host

==== Match-up results ====
	Round 1							Round 2						
Team ╲ Game	1	2	3	4	5	6	7	8	9	10	11	12	13	14
AdU	La Salle school colors	NU school colors	Ateneo school colors	FEU school colors	UST school colors	UE school colors	UP school colors	Ateneo school colors	NU school colors	UP school colors	UE school colors	UST school colors	FEU school colors	La Salle school colors
AdMU	UP school colors	FEU school colors	Adamson school colors	UST school colors	UE school colors	NU school colors	La Salle school colors	Adamson school colors	UST school colors	La Salle school colors	FEU school colors	NU school colors	UE school colors	UP school colors
DLSZ	Adamson school colors	UST school colors	UP school colors	UE school colors	NU school colors	FEU school colors	Ateneo school colors	UP school colors	FEU school colors	Ateneo school colors	NU school colors	UE school colors	UST school colors	Adamson school colors
FEU	UE school colors	Ateneo school colors	NU school colors	Adamson school colors	UP school colors	La Salle school colors	UST school colors	UE school colors	La Salle school colors	UST school colors	Ateneo school colors	UP school colors	Adamson school colors	NU school colors
NU	UST school colors	Adamson school colors	FEU school colors	UP school colors	La Salle school colors	Ateneo school colors	UE school colors	UST school colors	Adamson school colors	UE school colors	La Salle school colors	Ateneo school colors	UP school colors	FEU school colors
UE	FEU school colors	UP school colors	UST school colors	La Salle school colors	Ateneo school colors	Adamson school colors	NU school colors	FEU school colors	UP school colors	NU school colors	Adamson school colors	La Salle school colors	Ateneo school colors	UST school colors
UP	Ateneo school colors	UE school colors	La Salle school colors	NU school colors	FEU school colors	UST school colors	Adamson school colors	La Salle school colors	UE school colors	Adamson school colors	UST school colors	FEU school colors	NU school colors	Ateneo school colors
UST	NU school colors	La Salle school colors	UE school colors	Ateneo school colors	Adamson school colors	UP school colors	FEU school colors	NU school colors	Ateneo school colors	FEU school colors	UP school colors	Adamson school colors	La Salle school colors	UE school colors

Source: ABS-CBN Sports
= Win; = Loss

==== Scores ====
Team	AdU	ADMU	DLSZ	FEU	NU	UE	UP	UST
Adamson		3–0	3–0	1–3	0–3	0–3	3–0	3–1
Ateneo	0–3		0–3	0–3	0–3	0–3	3–2	0–3
La Salle	1–3	3–1		0–3	1–3	0–3	3–0	1–3
FEU	0–3	3–0	3–2		1–3	3–2	3–0	3–2
NU	3–2	3–0	3–0	1–3		3–0	3–0	3–1
UE	2–3	3–0	3–1	3–0	1–3		3–0	0–3
UP	0–3	2–3	0–3	0–3	0–3	0–3		0–3
UST	3–2	3–0	3–0	3–0	0–3	3–1	3–0	

Source: ABS-CBN Sports
Legend: Blue = left column team win; Red = top row team win.

=== Playoffs ===
2nd-seed playoff
3	UST	2
4	FEU	3

Semifinals; Top seeds twice-to-beat
1	NSNU	3
L1	Adamson	0
2	FEU	0	3
3	UST	3	2

Finals; Best-of-three series
1	NSNU	3	3
2	FEU	1	0

=== Second-seed playoff ===
November 28; 8:00 AM (UTC +8:00)	UST Tiger Cubs	2–3	FEU–D Baby Tamaraws	Filoil Flying V Centre, San Juan City; Attendance: 95; Referees: Rene Gaspillo and Erlindo Eusebio
November 28; 8:00 AM (UTC +8:00)	(21–25, 25–22, 25–22, 23–25, 16–18)			Filoil Flying V Centre, San Juan City; Attendance: 95; Referees: Rene Gaspillo and Erlindo Eusebio

=== Semifinals ===
NU vs Adamson NU with twice-to-beat advantage.
Elimination round results:

- (Oct 14) NU def. Adamson 3–0 • 25–14, 25–20, 25–22
- (Nov 11) NU def. Adamson 3–2 • 25–12, 22–25, 25–19, 22–25, 15–13

December 1; 8:00 AM (UTC +8:00)	NUNS Bullpups	3–0	Adamson Baby Falcons	Filoil Flying V Centre, San Juan City; Attendance: 100; Referees: Erlindo Eusebio and Rene Gaspillo
December 1; 8:00 AM (UTC +8:00)	(25–17, 25–15, 25–11)			Filoil Flying V Centre, San Juan City; Attendance: 100; Referees: Erlindo Eusebio and Rene Gaspillo

FEU vs UST FEU with twice-to-beat advantage.
Elimination round results:

- (Oct 26) FEU def. UST 3–2 • 17–25, 25–27, 25–17, 25–17, 15–11
- (Nov 17) UST def. FEU 3–0 • 25–19, 25–17, 25–16

December 1; 10:00 AM (UTC +8:00)	FEU–D Baby Tamaraws	0–3	UST Tiger Cubs	Filoil Flying V Centre, San Juan City; Attendance: 120; Referees: Mark Santos and Yul Benosa
December 1; 10:00 AM (UTC +8:00)	(15–25, 20–25, 15–25)			Filoil Flying V Centre, San Juan City; Attendance: 120; Referees: Mark Santos and Yul Benosa

December 5; 10:00 AM (UTC +8:00)	FEU–D Baby Tamaraws	3–2	UST Tiger Cubs	Filoil Flying V Centre, San Juan City; Attendance: 350; Referees: Mark Santos and Angelo Haw
December 5; 10:00 AM (UTC +8:00)	(24–26, 26–16, 25–23, 13–25, 15–9); P–2			Filoil Flying V Centre, San Juan City; Attendance: 350; Referees: Mark Santos and Angelo Haw

=== Finals ===
NU vs FEU Best-of-three series.
Elimination round results:

- (Oct 17) NU def. FEU 3–1 • 25–20, 21–25, 25–16, 25–18
- (Nov 25) FEU def. NU 3–1 • 21–25, 25–23, 25–22, 25–21

December 9; 09:00 (UTC +8:00)	NUNS Bullpups	3–1	FEU–D Baby Tamaraws	Filoil Flying V Centre, San Juan City; Attendance: 648; Referees: Erlindo Eusebio and Rene Gaspillo
December 9; 09:00 (UTC +8:00)	(25–19, 22–25, 25–18, 25–13); P–2			Filoil Flying V Centre, San Juan City; Attendance: 648; Referees: Erlindo Eusebio and Rene Gaspillo

December 12; 13:00 (UTC +8:00)	NUNS Bullpups	3–0	FEU–D Baby Tamaraws	Filoil Flying V Centre, San Juan City; Attendance: 475; Referees: Fernando Velarde and Rene Gaspillo
December 12; 13:00 (UTC +8:00)	(25–21, 25–22, 25–21); P–2			Filoil Flying V Centre, San Juan City; Attendance: 475; Referees: Fernando Velarde and Rene Gaspillo

=== Awards ===
UAAP Season 81 boys' volleyball champions
NUNS Bullpups
Third title

- Most valuable player (Season): Jose Magdalino Javelona (FEU–D Baby Tamaraws)
- Most valuable player (Finals): Mac Arvin Bandola (NUNS Bullpups)
- Rookie of the Year:
- First Best Outside Spiker: Jose Magdalino Javelona (FEU–D Baby Tamaraws)
- Second Best Outside Spiker: Rey Miguel de Vega (UST Tiger Cubs)
- First Best Middle Blocker: Nathaniel del Pilar (Adamson Baby Falcons)
- Second Best Middle Blocker: Jomar Ocampo (NUNS Bullpups)
- Best opposite spiker: Lorenz Señoron (UST Tiger Cubs)
- Best setter: Diogenes Poquita (NUNS Bullpups)
- Best libero: Tracy Prudenciado (UST Tiger Cubs)
- Best server: Rey Miguel de Vega (UST Tiger Cubs)

== Girls' tournament ==
=== Team line-up ===
Adamson Lady Baby Falcons
No.	Name	Position
1	BORROMEO, Mary Grace	
2	CORDORA, Kyla	
3	VILLEGAS, Jen Kyle	
4	LALONGISIP, Maria (c)	
5	RICABLANCA, Raissa	
6	NUIQUE, May Ann	MB
7	ALCANTARA, Angelica	S
8	VERDEFLOR, Ma. Joahna	L
9	SANTIAGO, Kate	OH
12	TORING, Renella Jade	MB
13	TAGISIP, Apryle	MB
15	JUEGOS, Ayesha	OP
16	CUENCA, Jaochen	
18	TORING, Lorene Grace	MB
	GETIGAN, Rogelio	HC

De La Salle Junior Lady Archers
No.	Name	Position
1	ENCARNACION, Jewel Hannah Ysabelle	MB
2	MACAVINTA, Giovannah	
3	CARANGAN, Kajia	S
4	CRUZ, Alyssa Marie	
6	DE LEON, Lyka May	L
7	BONAFE, Theo Bea	MB
8	JAZARENO, Ylizyeth Justine (c)	OP
9	MALALUAN, Alleiah Jan	OH
10	WEBB, Gabrielle Blessing	
12	CANINO, Angel Anne	OH
13	GACULA, Freebie Alejandra	L
14	TAN, Rachelle Angelique	
15	DY, Ariya Kaila	OH
18	CARBALLO, Ma. Cassandra Rae	S
	SALAK, Christina	HC

FEU Lady Baby Tamaraws
No.	Name	Position
2	RUPINTA, Irish Victoria	
3	ALBERTO, Marilla Issabel	S
4	CAPUTOLAN, Ana Mae	
6	JUANCO, Alexandra Maxine	L
7	PACIA, Zey Mitzi	
8	PEROLINO, Zenneth Irene	
9	MINER, Alexis Ciarra	MB
11	GALLO, Gillianne Heinz	L
12	VERNAIZ, Mary Grace	
15	PAPA, Florize Anne	
16	DE GUZMAN, Lyann Marie Loise (c)	
17	KISEO, Shiela Mae	OH
18	MEDINA, Nikka Ann	
19	ASIS, Jean	MB
	DEL ROSARIO, Rodrigo	HC

NSNU Lady Bullpups
No.	Name	Position
1	ORDIALES, Ma. Jessa	MB
3	DOROMAL, Roma Mae	L
4	BELEN, Mhicaela	OH
6	ALINSUG, Evangeline	OH
7	CAL, Kamille Angelica	S
8	TORING, Sheena Angela	MB
9	JARDIO, Shaira Mae	L
10	LARROZA, Princess Maicah	OH
11	NISPEROS, Faith Janine Shirley (c)	OH
12	SOLOMON, Alyssa Jae	OP
13	LAMINA, Camilla Victoria	S
15	PANGILINAN, Erin May	MB
17	JAMILI, Jimy Jean	OH
18	MAAYA, Minerva	MB
	CASTILLO, Raymund	HC

UE Junior Lady Warriors
No.	Name	Position
1	BORBON, Maria Arabela	
2	ALFEREZ, Terish Anne Mery	
3	MONTEMAYOR, Hazel	
4	CAPILLANO, Ella Mae (c)	
5	TANNAGAN, France	L
6	TEOPE, Paula Isabel	
8	GARCIA, Freighanne Seanelle	
9	LERO, Ankhrisia	S
10	ESPIRITU, Romeena	
11	REYES, Angelica	L
12	PELAGA, Lia Alexa	
13	MINA, Kristina Andrea	
14	CORTEY, Maria Charmilote	
15	LAYUGAN, Kathleen Keith	
	DIMACULANGAN, Chris	HC

UP Junior Lady Maroons
No.	Name	Position
1	LOPEZ, Beatriz	
2	FERRER, Simoune (c)	
3	PINEDA, Lara Jean	
6	CAPISTRANO, Giesha	
7	AVILA, Alyssa Bianca	
8	BADONG, Trixie Marie	
9	OMAR, Alliah Kristine	
11	EVANGELISTA, Jelena	
13	CONCEPCION, Karla Crizelle	L
15	DE GUIA, Frances	
17	COMETA, MAria Lorraine	
18	REBLANDO, Julianna	S
19	MARQUEZ, Alizia Kristine	
20	JACKSON, Mary Angela	
	FIEL, Andy	HC

UST Golden Tigress Cubs
No.	Name	Position
1	PENAFIEL, Renee Lou	OH
2	GARCES, Khaira Reese	L
3	PONO, Abegail	
4	PEPITO, Maria Bernadett	L
5	CEPADA, Kc	OH
6	HERNANDEZ, Imee Kim Gabriela (c)	MB
9	JACULAN, Merry Rose	
11	FRAGO, Jamie Margaret	
12	NARCISO, Tanya Francesca	S
13	DE GUZMAN, Hannah	
14	JURADO, Regina Grace	OP
15	ABUEG, Mary Joyce	
16	CARREON, Jullana Desta	
18	TORRES, Janna Elizabeth	MB
	REYES, Emilio Jr.	HC

Legend
S	Setter
MB	Middle Blocker
OH	Outside Hitter
OP	Opposite Hitter
L	Libero
(c)	Team Captain
HC	Head coach

=== Elimination round ===
==== Team standings ====
Pos	Team	Pld	W	L	Pts	SW	SL	SR	SPW	SPL	SPR	Qualification
1	NUNS Lady Bullpups	12	10	2	29 (Note: Head-to-head record: NSNU 1–1 DLSZ; NSNU +1)	33	12	2.750	1059	833	1.271	Twice-to-beat in the semifinals
2	Zobel Junior Lady Archers	12	10	2	28	32	13	2.462	1055	887	1.189	Twice-to-beat in the semifinals
3	UST Junior Tigresses	12	8	4	25	30	14	2.143	993	905	1.097	Twice-to-win in the semifinals
4	Adamson Lady Baby Falcons	12	7	5	20	25	21	1.190	995	963	1.033	Twice-to-win in the semifinals
5	FEU–D Lady Baby Tamaraws (H)	12	5	7	18	22	22	1.000	976	947	1.031	
6	UE Junior Lady Warriors	12	2	10	6	6	31	0.194	675	892	0.757	
7	UPIS Junior Lady Maroons	12	0	12	0	1	36	0.028	602	928	0.649	

Source: ABS-CBN Sports
Rules for classification: 1) number of wins; 2) if tied for #2 or #4, one-game playoff; 3) match points; 4) sets ratio; 5) points ratio; 6) head-to-head record
(H) Host

==== Match-up results ====
	Round 1						Round 2					
Team ╲ Game	1	2	3	4	5	6	7	8	9	10	11	12
AdU	FEU school colors	UE school colors	NU school colors	La Salle school colors	UP school colors	UST school colors	UE school colors	NU school colors	FEU school colors	UP school colors	La Salle school colors	UST school colors
DLSZ	UE school colors	NU school colors	Adamson school colors	UP school colors	UST school colors	FEU school colors	UP school colors	UST school colors	UE school colors	NU school colors	Adamson school colors	FEU school colors
FEU	Adamson school colors	UP school colors	UST school colors	UE school colors	NU school colors	La Salle school colors	UST school colors	UE school colors	NU school colors	Adamson school colors	UP school colors	La Salle school colors
NU	La Salle school colors	Adamson school colors	UP school colors	UST school colors	FEU school colors	UE school colors	Adamson school colors	FEU school colors	UP school colors	La Salle school colors	UST school colors	UE school colors
UE	La Salle school colors	Adamson school colors	UP school colors	UST school colors	FEU school colors	NU school colors	Adamson school colors	FEU school colors	UP school colors	La Salle school colors	UST school colors	NU school colors
UP	UST school colors	FEU school colors	UE school colors	NU school colors	La Salle school colors	Adamson school colors	La Salle school colors	UST school colors	UE school colors	NU school colors	Adamson school colors	FEU school colors
UST	UP school colors	FEU school colors	UE school colors	NU school colors	La Salle school colors	Adamson school colors	FEU school colors	UP school colors	La Salle school colors	UE school colors	NU school colors	Adamson school colors

Source: ABS-CBN Sports
= Win; = Loss

==== Game results ====
Team	AdU	DLSZ	FEU-D	NSNU	UE	UPIS	UST
Adamson		0–3	3–2	2–3	3–0	3–0	3–2
La Salle	3–2		1–3	1–3	3–0	3–0	3–2
FEU-D	2–3	1–3		0–3	3–0	3–0	0–3
NSNU	3–0	1–3	3–2		3–0	3–0	3–1
UE	0–3	0–3	0–3	0–3		3–0	0–3
UPIS	0–3	0–3	0–3	0–3	1–3		0–3
UST	3–0	1–3	3–0	3–2	3–0	3–0	

Source: ABS-CBN Sports
Legend: Blue = left column team win; Red = top row team win.

=== Playoffs ===
Semifinals (Nos. 1 & 2 have twice-to-beat advantage)
1	NSNU	3
4	Adamson	0
2	DLSZ	3
3	UST	0

Finals (Best-of-three series)
1	NSNU	2	2
2	DLSZ	3	3

=== Semifinals ===
NU vs Adamson NU with twice-to-beat advantage.
Elimination round results:

- (Oct 17) NU def. Adamson 3–2 • 25–16, 22–25, 25–27, 25–12, 15–7
- (Nov 11) NU def. Adamson 3–0 • 25–19, 25–18, 31–29

November 28; 12:00 PM (UTC +8:00)	NUNS Lady Bullpups	3–0	Adamson Lady Baby Falcons	Filoil Flying V Centre, San Juan City; Attendance: 240; Referees: Erlindo Eusebio and Rene Gaspillo
November 28; 12:00 PM (UTC +8:00)	(25–15, 25–19, 25–20)			Filoil Flying V Centre, San Juan City; Attendance: 240; Referees: Erlindo Eusebio and Rene Gaspillo

La Salle vs UST La Salle with twice-to-beat advantage.
Elimination round results:

- (Oct 23) La Salle def. UST 3–2 • 23–25, 25–11, 23–25, 25–19, 15–11
- (Nov 17) La Salle def. UST 3–1 • 25–23, 25–19, 16–25, 27–25

November 28; 10:00 AM (UTC +8:00)	Zobel Junior Lady Archers	3–0	UST Junior Tigresses	Filoil Flying V Centre, San Juan City; Attendance: 235; Referees: Romulo Reforsado and Bobby Celso
November 28; 10:00 AM (UTC +8:00)	(25–23, 25–21, 25–20)			Filoil Flying V Centre, San Juan City; Attendance: 235; Referees: Romulo Reforsado and Bobby Celso

=== Finals ===
NU vs La Salle Best-of-three series.
Elimination round results:

- (Oct 14) NU def. La Salle 3–1 • 25–22, 23–25, 15–25, 22–25
- (Nov 21) La Salle def. NU 3–1 • 25–18, 25–12, 18–25, 25–20

December 5; 12:00 PM (UTC +8:00)	NUNS Lady Bullpups	2–3	Zobel Junior Lady Archers	Filoil Flying V Centre, San Juan City; Attendance: 520; Referees: Rene Gaspillo and Joy De Imus
December 5; 12:00 PM (UTC +8:00)	(23–25, 26–28, 25–13, 25–19, 13–15); P–2			Filoil Flying V Centre, San Juan City; Attendance: 520; Referees: Rene Gaspillo and Joy De Imus

December 9 TBD (UTC +8:00)	NUNS Lady Bullpups	2–3	Zobel Junior Lady Archers	Filoil Flying V Centre, San Juan City; Attendance: 685
December 9 TBD (UTC +8:00)	(21–25, 23–25, 25–15, 25–16, 8–15)			Filoil Flying V Centre, San Juan City; Attendance: 685

=== Awards ===
UAAP Season 81 girls' volleyball champions
Zobel Junior Lady Archers
Tenth title

- Most valuable player (Season): Angel Canino (Zobel Junior Lady Archers)
- Most valuable player (Finals): Justine Jazareno (Zobel Junior Lady Archers)
- Rookie of the Year:
- First Best Outside Spiker: Angel Canino (Zobel Junior Lady Archers)
- Second Best Outside Spiker: Alleiah Malaluan (Zobel Junior Lady Archers)
- First Best Middle Blocker: Mayang Nuique (Adamson Lady Baby Falcons)
- Second Best Middle Blocker: Alexis Miner (FEU–D Lady Baby Tamaraws)
- Best opposite spiker: Ayesha Juegos (Adamson Lady Baby Falcons)
- Best setter: Camilla Lamina (NUNS Lady Bullpups)
- Best libero: Ma. Bernadette Pepito (UST Junior Tigresses)
- Best server: Alleiah Malaluan (Zobel Junior Lady Archers)

== Overall championship points ==
=== Seniors' division ===
Team	Men	Women	Total
Ateneo Blue Eagles	10	15	25
FEU Tamaraws	12	8	20
NU Bulldogs	15	4	19
UST Growling Tigers	6	12	18
De La Salle Green Archers	4	10	14
Adamson Soaring Falcons	8	1	9
UP Fighting Maroons	1	6	7
UE Red Warriors	2	2	4

=== Juniors' division ===
Team	Boys'	Girls'	Points
NUNS Bullpups	15	12	27
UST Tiger Cubs	10	10	20
Zobel Junior Archers	4	15	19
FEU–D Baby Tamaraws	12	6	18
Adamson Baby Falcons	8	8	16
UE Junior Red Warriors	6	4	10
UPIS Junior Fighting Maroons	1	2	3
Ateneo Blue Eaglets	2	—	2

Pts.	Ranking
15	Champion
12	2nd
10	3rd
8	4th
6	5th
4	6th
2	7th
1	8th
—	Did not join

In case of a tie, the team with the higher position in any tournament is ranked higher. If both are still tied, they are listed by alphabetical order.

How rankings are determined:

- Ranks 5th to 8th determined by elimination round standings.
- Loser of the #1 vs #4 semifinal match-up is ranked 4th
- Loser of the #2 vs #3 semifinal match-up is ranked 3rd
- Loser of the finals is ranked 2nd
- Champion is ranked 1st

== See also ==
- NCAA Season 94 volleyball tournaments

Preceded by Season 80 (2018)	UAAP volleyball tournaments Season 81 (2019)	Succeeded by Season 82 (2020)
