= 2018 Philippine Super Liga Collegiate Grand Slam =

Collegiate conference of the 2018 Philippine Super Liga season

- Duration: November 3 – December 20, 2018
- Teams: 6
- TV partner(s): ESPN5

Results
- Champions: UP Lady Maroons
- Runners-up: UST Golden Tigresses
- Third place: UE Lady Warriors
- Fourth place: FEU Lady Tamaraws

Awards
- MVP: Tots Carlos
- Best OH: Tots Carlos; Mary Anne Mendrez
- Best MB: Aieshalaine Gannaban; Christine Dianne Francisco
- Best OPP: Eya Laure
- Best Setter: Laizah Bendong
- Best Libero: Kath Arado

PSL conference chronology
- < 2018 All-Filipino 2019 Grand Prix >

The 2018 Philippine Super Liga Collegiate Grand Slam was a college volleyball tournament hosted by the Philippine Super Liga. The tournament featured six teams and ran from November 3 to December 20, 2018.

The tournament was won by the UP Lady Fighting Maroons, who beat the UST Golden Tigresses in the final. As champions, UP earned a training camp in Thailand.

This conference ran simultaneously with the 2018 All-Filipino Conference.

== Teams ==
2018 PSL Collegiate Grand Slam teams
Abbr.	Team	School	Colors	Head coach	Team captain
CSA	CSA-Biñan Eagles	Colegio San Agustin – Biñan		(Philippines) Rey Anthony Beniga	(Philippines) Kristine Charlotte Hammond
DLD	DLSU-D Lady Patriots	De La Salle University – Dasmariñas		(Philippines) Joven Racelis	(Philippines) Eunice Gercie Castillo
FEU	FEU Lady Tamaraws	Far Eastern University		(Philippines) Rei Diaz Jr.	(Philippines) Lycha Ebon
UEC	UE Lady Warriors	University of the East		(Philippines) Rodrigo Roque	(Philippines) Roselle Baliton
UPD	UP Lady Maroons	University of the Philippines		(Kenya) Godfrey Okumu	(Philippines) Diana Mae Carlos
UST	UST Golden Tigresses	University of Santo Tomas		(Philippines) Emilio Reyes Jr.	(Philippines) Christine Dianne Francisco

Line-up

Legend
S	Setter
MH	Middle Blocker
OH	Outside Hitter
OP	Opposite Hitter
L	Libero
(Capt.)	Team captain
HC	Head coach

CSA-Biñan Eagles
No.	Player name	Position
1	Mary Rose Delos Santos	L
2	Aimee Lacambra	
3	Maria Alexerie Flores	
4	Andrea Kate Parel	
5	Lency Duarte	
6	Erika Aliana Rivera	
7	Roxanne Alfaro	
8	Aliah Marce	
9	Nicole May Duran	
10	Venice Puzon	
11	Haidee Bernardo	
12	Maveth Torres	
14	Kristine Charlotte Hammond (Capt.)	
17	Franchesca De Leon	L
	Rey Anthony Beniga	HC

DLSU-D Lady Patriots
No.	Player name	Position
1	Eunice Gercie Castillo (Capt.)	
2	Kimberly Wong	
3	Katrina Carranza	
4	Jubilee Anne Del Rosario	
5	Angel Auby Protacio	
6	Yasmin Shane Parohinog	L
7	Mara Allyza Galicia	
8	Rain Cyrille Ramos	
9	Myell Joy Pasco	
10	Ethel Betrice Tono	
11	Jenny Balagdatan	
12	Pearl Alexandrette Peña	L
13	Shaina Charisse Velasco	
14	Basilyn Delfin	
	Joven Racelis	HC

FEU Lady Tamaraws
No.	Player name	Position
2	Fiona Abijay	L
4	France Elize Ronquillo	OH
6	Ivana Marie Agudo	OPP
7	Lycha Ebon (Capt.)	OH
8	Maria Angelica Cayuna	S
9	Jamaica Pascua	
10	Toni Rose Basas	OH
11	Martha Mora	
12	Alianne Florendo	
13	Sheena Gallentes	
14	Ezra Madrigal	
16	Czarina Grace Carandang	MB
17	Jesca Marie Tanguin	
19	Clavel Dejito	
	Rei Diaz Jr.	HC

UE Lady Warriors
No.	Player name	Position
1	Judith Abil	OH
2	Lhara May Clavano	OH
3	Mariella Gabarda	MB
4	Mary Anne Mendrez	OH
5	Kathleen Faith Arado	L
6	Juliet Catindig	OH
7	Seth Rodriguez	MB
8	Zilfa Geline Olarve	OP
10	Jasckin May Babol	L
11	Carol De Leon	S
12	Roselle Baliton (Capt.)	MB
14	Laizah Bendong	S
15	Jasmine Gayle Alcayde	OP
17	Remcel Joyce Santos	MB
	Rodrigo Roque	HC

UP Lady Maroons
No.	Player name	Position
2	Lorielyn Bernardo	MB
3	Maristela Genn Layug	MB
5	Patricia Elise Siao	L
6	Jessma Clarice Ramos	MB
7	Andreanna Paulsen Lagman	OH
8	Nicole Ann Magsarile	OH
11	Caryl Sandoval	OH
12	Michaela Louise Osorio	
13	Justine Dorog	OH
14	Aieshalaine Gannaban	MB
15	Mary Mirgie Bautista	L
17	Maria Arielle Estrañero	S
18	Diana Mae Carlos (Capt.)	OP
19	Marianne Sotomil	S
	Godfrey Okumu	HC

UST Golden Tigresses
No.	Player name	Position
1	Rizalinda Martin	L
2	Donna Mae Tuazon	MB
3	Ysabel Jamie Jimenez	OH
4	Caitlin Viray	OP
6	Milena Alessandrini	OH
8	Eya Laure	OP
9	Rachelle Roldan	
11	Camille Victoria	MB
12	Kecelyn Galdones	OH
13	Mafe Galanza	S
14	Christine Francisco (Capt.)	MB
15	Janine Balcorta	OP
16	Maria Agatha Mangulabnan	S
17	Janel Delerio	L
	Emilio Reyes Jr.	HC

== Format ==
Preliminary round

- The preliminary round was a single round-robin tournament, with each team playing one match against all other teams for a total of five matches.
- The top two teams advanced to the championship match while teams ranked third and fourth would play in the third-place match. The remaining teams were eliminated.

Finals

- Both the championship and third-place matches were single-elimination.
- The match-ups were as follows:
  - Championship: Semifinal round winners
  - Third-place match: Semifinal round losers

== Preliminary round ==
Pos	Team	Pld	W	L	Pts	SW	SL	SR	SPW	SPL	SPR	Qualification
1	UST Golden Tigresses	5	5	0	15	15	2	7.500	409	301	1.359	Championship
2	UP Lady Maroons	5	4	1	12	12	5	2.400	407	345	1.180	Championship
3	UE Lady Warriors	5	2	3	7	10	9	1.111	432	384	1.125	Third place match
4	FEU Lady Tamaraws	5	2	3	6	9	11	0.818	398	410	0.971	Third place match
5	DLSU-D Lady Patriots	5	1	4	3	3	13	0.231	298	383	0.778	
6	CSA-Biñan Eagles	5	1	4	2	5	14	0.357	323	444	0.727	

Rules for classification: 3 points = win match in 3 or 4 sets; 2 points = win match in 5 sets; 1 point = lose match in 5 sets; 0 point = lose match in 3 or 4 sets

Match results

- All times are in Philippine Standard Time (UTC+08:00)

Date	Time		Score		Set 1	Set 2	Set 3	Set 4	Set 5	Total	Report
03 Nov	12:00	UPD	3–1	UEC	22–25	25–16	25–22	31–29		103–92	
03 Nov	14:00	CSA	0–3	UST	12–25	13–25	10–25			35–75	
10 Nov	12:00	DLD	0–3	FEU	21–25	16–25	11–25			48–75	
10 Nov	14:00	CSA	1–3	UPD	6–25	25–21	16–25	22–25		69–96	
17 Nov	12:00	FEU	1–3	UST	16–25	25–13	17–25	15–25		73–88	
24 Nov	12:00	UEC	3–0	DLD	25–11	26–24	25–13			76–48	
24 Nov	14:00	FEU	0–3	UPD	20–25	15–25	19–25			54–75	
01 Dec	12:00	FEU	2–3	CSA	17–25	22–25	25–12	25–18	12–15	101–95	
01 Dec	14:00	UPD	0–3	UST	22–25	17–25	19–25			58–75	
08 Dec	12:00	FEU	3–2	UEC	14–25	25–23	16–25	25–18	15–13	95–104	
08 Dec	14:00	DLD	0–3	UPD	21–25	12–25	22–25			55–75	
11 Dec	12:00	UST	3–1	UEC	27–25	19–25	25–14	25–20		96–84	
13 Dec	16:00	UEC	3–0	CSA	25–10	26–24	25–8			76–42	
13 Dec	19:00	DLD	0–3	UST	15–25	16–25	20–25			51–75	
18 Dec	16:00	CSA	1–3	DLD	23–25	18–25	25–21	16–25		82–96	P–4

== Final round ==
Bronze medal

Date	Time		Score		Set 1	Set 2	Set 3	Set 4	Set 5	Total	Report
20 Dec	14:00	UEC	3–0	FEU	27–25	25–23	25–16			77–64	

Gold medal

Date	Time		Score		Set 1	Set 2	Set 3	Set 4	Set 5	Total	Report
20 Dec	16:00	UST	1–3	UPD	21–25	25–16	23–25	19–25		88–91	

== Final standings ==
Rank	Team
1st place, gold medalist(s)	UP Lady Maroons
2nd place, silver medalist(s)	UST Golden Tigresses
3rd place, bronze medalist(s)	UE Lady Warriors
4	FEU Lady Tamaraws
5	DLSU-D Lady Patriots
6	CSA-Biñan Eagles

2018 PSL Collegiate Grand Slam Champions
UP Lady Maroons
Lorielyn Bernardo, Maristela Genn Layug, Patricia Elise Siao, Jessma Clarice Ramos, Andreanna Pauleen Lagman,
Nicole Ann Magsarile, Caryl Sandoval, Michaela Louise Osorio, Justine Dorog, Aieshalaine Gannaban,
Mary Mirgie Bautista, Maria Arielle Estrañero, Diana Mae Carlos (Capt.), Marianne Sotomil
Head coach: Godfrey Okumu

== Individual awards ==
Award		Name (team)
Most Valuable Player		Diana Mae Carlos (University of the Philippines)
Best Outside Spiker	1st:	Diana Mae Carlos (University of the Philippines)
Best Outside Spiker	2nd:	(Philippines) Mary Anne Mendrez (University of the East)
Best Middle Blocker	1st:	Aieshalaine Gannaban (University of the Philippines)
Best Middle Blocker	2nd:	(Philippines) Christine Dianne Francisco (University of Santo Tomas)
Best Opposite Spiker		(Philippines) Ejiya Laure (University of Santo Tomas)
Best Setter		(Philippines) Laizah Ann Bendong (University of the East)
Best Libero		(Philippines) Kathleen Faith Arado (University of the East)
Best Scorer		(Philippines) (Italy) Milena Alessandrini (University of Santo Tomas)

== Venues ==
- Ynares Sports Arena
