= Vangie de Jesus =

Filipino volleyball player (died 2020)

Personal information
- Full name: Evangeline de Jesus
- Nationality: Filipino
- Born: 1951 or 1952
- Died: November 21, 2020 (aged 68)
- Education: University of the East

Coaching information
- Previous teams coached
- Years: Teams
- 2007–2011: UE Lady Red Warriors

Volleyball information

National team
- Years: Team
- –: Philippines
Honours
Representing Philippines
Women's Volleyball
Southeast Asian Games
Gold medal – first place	1977 Kuala Lumpur	Team
Gold medal – first place	1979 Jakarta	Team
Gold medal – first place	1981 Manila	Team

Evangeline "Vangie" de Jesus was a Filipino volleyball player who was captain of the Philippine national team.

== Career ==
=== Playing career ===
==== College ====
During her college years, Vangie de Jesus played for the University of the East Lady Red Warriors in the University Athletic Association of the Philippines (UAAP).

==== National team ====
De Jesus helped the Philippine national team clinch the gold medal in the 1977, 1979, and 1981 Southeast Asian Games and was part of the squad that partook in the 1982 Asian Games. She is reputed for her spikes and set delivery and was supported by the Gintong Alay program of the national government.

=== Coaching and sports administration ===
De Jesus later coached the UE Lady Red Warriors from 2007 to 2011 in the UAAP. Along with fellow former player Dulce Pante, De Jesus also worked as Spectator Development Manager in the Philippine Super Liga and was also a physical education instructor.

De Jesus was also part of the Philippine Volleyball Federation (PVF) as its secretary general having been elected in 2010. She and PVF board member Adrian Laurel was suspended in early 2013 for forming a national team committee headed by Ramon Suzara, allegedly without PVF board approval.

== Death ==
De Jesus died on November 21, 2020, due to cardiac arrest at the age of 68.
