= Kath Arado =

Filipino volleyball player (born 1998)

Personal information
- Full name: Kathleen Faith Pepito Arado
- Born: May 22, 1998 (age 28); Iligan, Lanao del Norte, Philippines
- Height: 5 ft 5 in (1.65 m)
- Weight: 55 kg (121 lb)
- Spike: 254 cm (100 in)
- Block: 252 cm (99 in)
- Education: University of the East (2015–2019)

Volleyball information
- Position: Libero
- Current club: PLDT High Speed Hitters
- Number: 8

Career
Years	Teams
2016–2020	Generika-Ayala Lifesavers
2021	Petro Gazz Angels
2022–present	PLDT High Speed Hitters

National team
2016	Philippines (U19)
2019-	Philippines
Honours
Women's volleyball
Representing Philippines
ASEAN Grand Prix
Bronze medal – third place	2019 Nakhon Ratchasima	Leg 1
Bronze medal – third place	2019 Santa Rosa	Leg 2
- Last updated: September 2021

Kathleen Faith Pepito Arado (born May 22, 1998) is a Filipino professional volleyball player who is an outside hitter and serves as team captain for the PLDT High Speed Hitters of the Premier Volleyball League (PVL).

== Early life and education ==
Kath Arado was born on May 22, 1998, in Iligan, Lanao del Norte. She studied at the Iligan City National High School where she played for its girls volleyball team. Arado then went to Manila to attend the University of the East.

== Career ==
=== Collegiate ===
Arado joined the UE Lady Warriors to play in the UAAP where she was awarded as the UAAP Season 77 Rookie of the Year, UAAP Season 79 Best Digger, and UAAP Season 80 Best Digger and Best Receiver.

=== Club ===
Arado joined the Generika-Ayala Lifesavers of the Philippine Super Liga. In 2021, she signed to Petro Gazz Angels, making her debut at the Premier Volleyball League. In January 2022, Arado joined the PLDT High Speed Hitters.

=== National team ===
Arado is a member of the Under-19 Philippines women's national volleyball team in 2016 which competed in the 2016 Asian Women's U19 Volleyball Championship. The team finished at 10th place defeating Australia, Hong Kong, Macau, and New Zealand. She was also the libero of the team which competed in the 2016 South East Asian Junior Women's Volleyball Championships where the team finished at the fourth place. She was awarded as the 2016 South East Asian Junior Women's Volleyball Championships Best Libero.

== Awards ==
=== Individual ===
- UAAP Season 77 "Rookie of the Year"
- 2016 ASEAN Junior Championship "Best Libero"
- UAAP Season 79 "Best Digger"
- UAAP Season 80 "Best Receiver"
- UAAP Season 80 "Best Digger"
- 2018 PSL Collegiate Grand Slam Conference "Best Libero"
- 2018 PSL All-Filipino Conference "Best Libero"
- UAAP Season 81 "Best Libero"
- 2021 Premier Volleyball League Open Conference "Best Libero"
- 2023 Premier Volleyball League All-Filipino Conference "Best Libero"
- 2023 Premier Volleyball League Invitational Conference "Best Libero"
- 2025 Premier Volleyball League On Tour "Best Libero"
- 2025 Premier Volleyball League Invitational Conference "Best Libero"
- 2025 Premier Volleyball League Invitational Conference "Finals Most Valuable Player"
- 2026 Premier Volleyball League All-Filipino Conference "Best Libero"

=== Collegiate ===
- 2018 PSL Collegiate Grand Slam Conference – Bronze medal, with University of the East Lady Warriors

=== Clubs ===
- 2018 PSL All-Filipino Conference – third place, with Generika-Ayala Lifesavers
- 2021 Premier Volleyball League Open Conference – third place, with Petro Gazz Angels
