= UE Junior Warriors and Lady Junior Warriors =

Varsity team

- School: University of the East
- League: UAAP
- Joined: 1952
- Location: Claro M. Recto Ave., Sampaloc Manila, Philippines
- Team colors: Red White

Juniors' general championships
- UAAP: 2 2005-06 2013-14

The UE Junior Warriors and Lady Junior Warriors are the Junior varsity teams of the University of the East who play in the University Athletic Association of the Philippines (UAAP) together with the university's senior teams, the UE Red Warriors and Lady Warriors.

== Volleyball ==
=== UAAP Season 74 ===
The UE Red Warriors Boys’ Volleyball Team was declared the Champion for the eighth consecutive year of the UAAP Boys’ Volleyball Tournament after defeating the University of Santo Tomas in three sets last February 5 at the UE Caloocan Gym. As such, the Boys’ Volleyball team now holds both the most number of championships won in the division with 11, as well as the longest winning streak in the division. The Warriors swept the elimination round of this year’s tournament with 10 wins and zero losses, giving them a twice-to-beat advantage going into the finals. UST, on the other hand, had to hurdle a bout against National University, with whom they shared a 7-wins, 3-losses standing after the elimination round.

The UE Red Warriors Girls’ Volleyball Team, for its part, was the 1st Runner-up in the Girls’ Volleyball Tournament after bowing to De La Salle Zobel at their matches on January 28 and 29, also at the UE Caloocan Gym. First-year student Christine Mhae Tolentino was recognized as the Rookie of the Year and Best Libero, while senior student Pia Gabrielle B. Sarmiento was the Best Receiver.

== Championship Tally ==
Sport	Total	Sport	Total
Basketball tournament	1	Football tournament	0
Chess tournament	5	Track and Field tournament	0
Table Tennis tournament	9	Volleyball tournament	15
Taekwondo tournament	1	Swimming tournament	3
Fencing tournament	4	Judo tournament	0

== Ranking ==
UAAP Season	BOYS'										GIRLS'		
UAAP Season	Basketball	Volleyball	Swimming	Chess	Table tennis	Track and field	Fencing	Taekwondo	Judo	Football	Volleyball	Swimming	Fencing
59th	5th	2nd	4th	2nd	1st	5th					4th	3rd	
61st	5th	4th	6th	4th	1st	6th					4th	3rd	
62nd	?	?	?	?	?	?	?	?			1st	?	
63rd	?	?	?	?	?	?	?	?			1st	?	
64th	1st	?	?	?	?	?	?	?			1st	?	
65th	?	1st	?	1st	1st	?		?			?	?	
66th	?	?	?	1st	1st	?		?			?	?	
67th	?	1st	?	1st	1st	?		?			?	?	
68th	7th	1st	3rd	1st	1st	5th		3rd			1st'	1st	
69th	6th	1st	2nd	1st	2nd	4th		3rd	2nd	-	1st	2nd	
70th	5th	1st	5th	3rd	2nd	5th		5th	3rd	-	2nd	3rd	
71st	6th	1st	5th	2nd	2nd	4th	2nd	1st	3rd	-	2nd	2nd	
72nd	5th	1st	4th	3rd	1st	4th	2nd	4th	2nd	-	2nd	2nd	
73rd	7th	1st	4th	5th	1st	4th	1st	2nd	4th	-	2nd	2nd	
74th	7th	1st	4th	5th	1st	4th	1st	2nd	3rd	-	2nd	1st	
75th	8th	1st	3rd	4th	2nd	2nd	1st	2nd	4th	-	4th	1st	1st

== See also ==
- UE Red Warriors
