= Laizah Bendong =

Filipina volleyball player (born 1997)

Personal information
- Full name: Laizah Ann Bendong
- Nickname: Lai
- Nationality: Filipino
- Born: August 11, 1997 (age 29)
- Home town: Iligan City, Philippines
- Education: University of the East
- Height: 1.65 m (5 ft 5 in)

Volleyball information
- Position: Setter

Laizah Ann Bendong (born August 11, 1997) is a Filipino professional volleyball player who last played for the BaliPure Purest Water Defenders of the Premier Volleyball League (PVL). She was awarded as the UAAP Best Setter in the UAAP Season 81 volleyball tournaments.

== Clubs ==
- (Philippines) Cherrylume Iron Lady Warriors (2017)
- (Philippines) Generika-Ayala Lifesavers (2018)
- (Philippines) Foton Tornadoes Blue Energy (2019)
- (Philippines) BaliPure Purest Water Defenders (2021)

== Awards ==
=== Individual ===
- '2018 PSL Collegiate Grand Slam Conference "Best Setter"
- 2019 UAAP Season 81 "Best Setter"
