= Mean Mendrez =

Filipino volleyball player

Personal information
- Full name: Mary Anne Mendrez
- Born: November 14, 1998 (age 27)
- Hometown: San Pedro, Laguna, Philippines
- Height: 5 ft 10 in (1.78 m)
- Weight: 58 kg (128 lb)
- Spike: 260 cm (100 in)
- Block: 262 cm (103 in)
- Education: University of the East

Volleyball information
- Position: Outside hitter Middle Blocker
- Current club: Choco Mucho Flying Titans

Career
Years	Teams
2016-2020	UE Lady Warriors
2018–2021	Petro Gazz Angels
2019–2021	Generika-Ayala Lifesavers
2022–2023	PLDT High Speed Hitters
2024–	Choco Mucho Flying Titans

National team
2016	Philippines (U19)

Mary Anne "Mean" Mendrez (born November 14, 1998) is a Filipino volleyball player, currently the outside hitter and middle blocker for the Choco Mucho Flying Titans. From 2016 to 2021, she was the outside spiker for the UE Lady Warriors volleyball team of the University Athletic Association of the Philippines, where in 2018 she was awarded as the PSL Collegiate Grand Slam Second Best Outside Spiker.

== Career ==
Mendrez was a member of the Under-19 Philippines women's national volleyball team, which competed in the 2016 South East Asian Junior Women's Volleyball Championships where the team finished in fourth place. In 2018, while still in college, she joined the Petro Gazz Angels in the Premier Volleyball League, staying for two seasons. The team finished in fourth place in the league's 2018 Open Conference. After the UAAP's Season 81, she also suited up for the Generika-Ayala Lifesavers in the Philippine Super Liga. Mendrez currently plays for the Choco Mucho Flying Titans.

== Clubs ==
- (Philippines) Petro Gazz Angels (2018, 2021)
- (Philippines) Generika-Ayala Lifesavers (2019–2020)
- (Philippines) PLDT High Speed Hitters (2022–2023)
- (Philippines) Choco Mucho Flying Titans (2024–present)

== Awards ==
=== Individual ===
- 2018 PSL Collegiate Grand Slam Conference "2nd Best Outside Spiker"

=== Collegiate ===
- 2018 PSL Collegiate Grand Slam Conference – Bronze medal, with the University of the East Lady Warriors

=== Club ===
- 2024 Premier Volleyball League All-Filipino Conference – 1st Runner-Up, with Choco Mucho Flying Titans
