= UE Red Warriors, Lady Warriors, Junior Warriors and Lady Junior Warriors =

Varsity teams in the Philippines

- School: University of the East
- League: UAAP
- Joined: 1952
- Location: Claro M. Recto Ave., Sampaloc Manila, Philippines
- Team colors: Red White
- Juniors' team: UE Junior Warriors

Seniors' general championships
- UAAP: 5 1965-66 1969-70 1971-72 1972-73 1974-75

Juniors' general championships
- UAAP: 2 2005-06 2013-14

The UE Red Warriors, Lady Warriors, Junior Warriors and Lady Junior Warriors are the collegiate men's and women's, and high school men's and women's, respectively, varsity teams of the University of the East (UE) that play in the University Athletic Association of the Philippines.

The athletic director of the university is Dr. Leo Viajar.

== Background ==
The University of the East is one of eight schools participating in the University Athletic Association of the Philippines. The UE Warriors teams have won UAAP championships in basketball, volleyball, fencing, table tennis and other sports. UE athletes also participate in other intercollegiate tournaments as well as invitational tournaments abroad.

== Sports ==
=== Basketball ===
As of 2006, The Red Warriors were tied with the University of Santo Tomas as the second most successful team in UAAP men's basketball, with 18 titles, most of them coming from the time of coach Baby Dalupan and Robert Jaworski.

The UE Red Warriors holds the longest senior basketball championship run, with seven straight UAAP titles. They also hold the longest finals streak appearances, with sixteen straight from 1957 to 1972. The team has also represented the country at the 1967 Summer Universiade.

UE also participates in the Father Martin Cup and Philippine Collegiate Champions League (PCCL) men's (and women's) basketball tournaments. The UE Red Warriors were crowned as champions of the 2006 Philippine Collegiate Champions League. They are also the 2013 FilOil/Flying V-Hanes Preseason Cup champions.

==== Pre UAAP season highlights ====
- Champion - 2013 FilOil Flying V Hanes Premier Cup: The Red Warriors won the 2013 FilOil Flying V Hanes Premier Cup.
- 10th Fr. Martin Division Cup: The team won the 10th Father Martin Division 2 Cup at the Trinity University of Asia in Quezon City.

==== UAAP seasons highlights ====
- UAAP Season 69: The team ended UAAP Season 69 (2006–07) in third place after failing to win their knockout match against University of Santo Tomas on September 21, 2006. They lost to the UST Growling Tigers by one point, 81–82.
- UAAP Season 70: The team ended it Finals-appearance drought in Season 70 (2007–08), finishing 14–0 sweep in elimination rounds and winning their games by at least 16 points. The team, however, lost the best-of-three Finals series to the De La Salle Green Archers 2–0.
- UAAP Season 72: On January 12, 2009, Lawrence Chongson replaced Dindo Pumaren as the team's head coach. the team participated in five tournaments, two of which were held abroad: the 2009 Ming Dao International Basketball Tournament held in March in Taipei, Taiwan; the Easter Showcase in Las Vegas, USA in April; the 2009 FilOil Flying V Pre-Season MVP Invitational Cup held at the FilOil Flying V Arena in San Juan; the PBL Flex Unity Cup (with the players comprising the "Cobra Energy Drink Warriors"). In the semi-finals of Season 72, The team defeated the Far Eastern University (FEU) Tamaraws to earn a slot in the finals, but lost to the Ateneo Blue Eagles in the Finals in three games.

==== Notable players ====
Red Warriors

- Marcy Arellano
- Paul Artadi
- Mark Borboran
- Allan Caidic
- KG Canaleta
- Jerry Codiñera
- Adama Diakhite
- Rudy Distrito
- Jolly Escobar
- Elmer Espiritu
- Robert Jaworski
- Paul Lee
- Xian Lim
- Rino Magsalin
- Charles Mammie
- Dong Manalo
- Jimmy Mariano
- Jojo Mariquit
- James Martinez
- Derrick Pumaren
- Bong Ravena
- Roi Sumang
- Ronald Tubid
- Tito Varela
- James Yap

==== Notable coaches ====
- Virgilio "Baby" Dalupan - "The Maestro", coach of the Red Warriors who gave them seven straight UAAP senior basketball titles, the longest championship streak in the UAAP. Grandslam coach in the Philippine Basketball Association
- Jaime "Jimmy" Mariano

=== Volleyball ===
The volleyball team won championships in Seasons 78, 79 and 80, but in Season 81 finished in 7th place.

==== Notable players ====
Lady Red Warriors

- Ma. Shaya Adorador – awarded as the 2019 PSL Invitational Cup 2nd Best Outside Hitter.
- Kath Arado – member of the Philippines women's national volleyball team from 2019 to 2021. She won Rookie of the Year, Best Digger, Best Receiver, and Best Libero awards in the UAAP league, and is a two-time Best Libero awardee in the semi-professional league Philippine Super Liga and a three-time Best Libero awardee in the professional league Premier Volleyball League.
- Laizah Ann Bendong – awarded as UAAP Season 81's Best Setter and the 2018 PSL Collegiate Grand Slam Conference Best Setter.
- Mary Anne Mendrez – awarded as the 2018 PSL Collegiate Grand Slam Conference 2nd Best Outside Hitter and was a member of the Philippines women's under-19 national volleyball team.
- Suzanne Roces – a product of UEWVT, she won a Rookie of the Year award in the UAAP league. She also won three MVP awards and one Best Blocker award in the Shakey's V-League.

=== Fencing ===
- UAAP Season 69 Champions: The men's and women's teams retained their titles at the 69th UAAP season's fencing competition, held at the Ateneo Blue Eagle Gym in Quezon City last February 10 and 11.
- UAAP Season 75 Champions: The men's and women's teams won the UAAP Season 75 fencing tournament at the Philsports Arena.

== Notable athletes ==
- Kath Arado — volleyball player, multi-awarded libero
- Rolando Canlas — fencing master SEA Games gold medalist
- Mercedito Manipol — middle distance champion
- Nelson Mariano II — RP Fifth Chess Grand Master
- Mean Mendrez — volleyball player
- Roel Ramirez — gymnast champion SEA Games gold medalist
- Bong Ravena — former PBA player and coach
- James Yap — PBA player and politician

== International competition ==
The UE Red Warriors men's basketball team represented the Philippines at the 1967 Summer Universiade in Tokyo, Japan.

At the 2007 Southeast Asian Games, eleven UE athletes were medalists in their respective sports. They were part of the 620 athletes that comprised Team Philippines that competed at the 24th Southeast Asian Games in Nakhon, Ratchasima, Thailand from December 6 to 15, 2007.

== Number of championships ==
See UE Junior Warriors for UE Junior Championships

Sport	Men's	Women's	Total
Basketball	18	1 (1977–78)	19
Volleyball	14	5	19
Football	3	1 (2001–02)	4
Fencing	8	7	15
Chess	2	0	2

Sport	Men's	Women's	Total
Judo	0	0	0
Taekwondo	0	0	0
Table Tennis	1	0	1
Tennis	0	0	0
Swimming	4	4	8

Sport	Men's	Women's	Total
Track and Field	9	1	10
Badminton	1	1	2
Beach Volleyball	0	0	0
Baseball	4	-	4
Softball	2	-	2

- Second most basketball championships overall
- Second most victories in seniors basketball tournaments

== UAAP rankings ==
See UE Junior Warriors for UE Junior Division Rankings

Seniors Division
These are the rankings of the university in the UAAP events it has participating in since 1986, the year the UAAP became an eight member-school league.

Men's
UAAP season	Basketball	Volleyball	Football	Fencing	Track and field	Beach Volleyball	Tennis	Badminton	Chess	Swimming	Table tennis	Taekwondo	Judo
49th													
50th	2nd	?	4th		?		?		?	?	?		
51st	5th	?	5th		?		?		?	?	?		
52nd	3rd	?	5th		?		?		?	?	?		
53rd	2nd	?	4th		?		?		?	?	?		
54th	7th	?	3rd		?		?		1st	?	?		
55th	8th	?	4th		?		?		?	?	?		
56th	4th	5th	4th		?		?		1st	?	?	?	
57th	3rd	5th	5th		1st		?	?	?	?	?	?	
58th	3rd	5th	5th		1st		?	?	?	?	?	?	
59th	3rd	5th	4th		1st		5th	6th	4th	5th	4th	4th	-
60th	5th	5th	4th		1st		?	?	?	?	?	?	?
61st	3rd	6th	4th		1st		6th	3rd	4th	5th	3rd	4th	4th
62nd	5th	5th	6th		1st		?		?	?	1st	?	?
63rd	5th	7th	5th	1st	1st		?		?	?	?	?	?
64th	5th	6th	4th	1st	1st		?		?	?	?	?	?
65th	3rd	6th	1st	1st	?		?	?	?	?	?	?	?
66th	3rd	6th	5th	1st	1st		?	?	?	?	?	?	?
67th	4th	6th	4th	?	?		?	?	?	?	?	?	?
68th	4th	6th	6th	1st	5th		5th	5th	4th	5th	3rd	2nd	4th
69th	3rd	7th	5th	1st	5th	5th	4th	2nd	4th	4th	4th	2nd	4th
70th	2nd	5th	5th	2nd	4th	4th	5th	2nd	4th	5th	3rd	6th	5th
71st	4th	7th	5th	2nd	4th	7th	5th	1st	5th	5th	5th	5th	5th
72nd	2nd	6th	5th	1st	1st	5th	5th	5th	2nd	5th	4th	6th	5th
73rd	6th	8th	4th	5th	2nd	6th	5th	6th	6th	5th	5th	6th	5th
74th	7th	8th	6th	8th	4th	5th	5th	7th	8th	5th	4th	6th	5th
75th	7th	8th	6th	1st	5th	5th	8th	4th	8th	5th	4th	4th	5th
76th	6th	8th	5th	1st	5th	7th	6th	8th	8th	5th	3rd	4th	5th
77th													
78th													
79th													
80th													
81st													
82nd													
83rd													
84th													
85th													

Women's
UAAP season	Basketball	Volleyball	Fencing	Track and field	Beach Volleyball	Softball	Badminton	Chess	Swimming	Taekwondo	Judo
49th											
50th	?	6th		?		?			?		
51st	?	5th		?		?			?		
52nd	?	6th		?		?			?		
53rd	?	5th		?		?			?		
54th	?	7th		?		?			?		
55th	?	5th		?		?			?		
56th	?	5th		?		?			?	?	
57th	?	4th		?		?	?		?	?	
58th	?	4th		?		?	?		?	?	
59th	6th	4th		4th		-	5th		5th	4th	-
60th	?	5th		?		?	?	?	?	?	?
61st	6th	3rd		5th		5th	7th	3rd	6th	5th	5th
62nd	?	6th		?		?	?	?	?	?	?
63rd	?	5th	?	?		?	?	?	?	?	?
64th	?	3rd	?	?		?	?	?	?	?	?
65th	?	5th	?	1st		1st	?	?	?	?	?
66th	?	4th	?	?		?	?	?	?	?	?
67th	?	3rd	?	?		?	?	?	?	?	?
68th	7th	5th	1st	2nd		3rd	7th	5th	5th	6th	5th
69th	6th	4th	3rd	3rd	2nd	4th	6th	5th	4th	5th	-
70th	7th	8th	1st	3rd	3rd	4th	7th	5th	5th	6th	5th
71st	8th	6th	1st	3rd	2nd	3rd	4th	5th	5th	6th	4th
72nd	8th	8th	1st	3rd	8th	4th	2nd	7th	5th	6th	5th
73rd	8th	8th	1st	3rd	5th	-	3rd	7th	5th	5th	4th
74th	8th	6th	1st	3rd	5th	3rd	1st	8th	5th	5th	4th
75th	8th	8th	1st	2nd	8th	5th	5th	8th	5th	6th	3rd
76th	7th	8th	1st	2nd	5th	4th	6th	8th	4th	8th	3rd
77th											
78th											
79th											
80th											
81st											
82nd											
83th											
84th											
85th											

== See also ==
- UE Junior Warriors
