= Angel Canino =

Filipino volleyball player (born 2003)

Personal information
- Full name: Angel Anne Canino
- Nickname: Gel
- Nationality: Filipino
- Born: June 25, 2003 (age 23)
- Home town: Bacolod, Philippines
- Education: De La Salle University
- Height: 1.80 m (5 ft 11 in)
- Weight: 64 kg (141 lb)
- Spike: 310 cm (122 in)
- Block: 305 cm (120 in)

Volleyball information
- Position: Outside hitter
- Current club: DLSU Lady Spikers
- Number: 12

National team
- Years: Team
- 2019: Philippines U23
- 2024–present: Philippines
Honours
Women's volleyball
Representing Philippines
Asian Nations Cup
Silver medal – second place	2025 Hanoi	Team
Bronze medal – third place	2024 Manila	Team
SEA Women's V.League
Bronze medal – third place	2025 Nakhon Ratchasima / Ninh Binh	Team
ASEAN School Games
Silver medal – second place	2019 Semarang	Team
- Updated on August 10, 2025

Angel Anne Canino (born June 25, 2003) is a Filipino volleyball player. Nicknamed the Heaven Sent, Canino has also been recognized for her contributions to the women's national volleyball team in the Philippines. She is best known for her collegiate career with the De La Salle Lady Spikers in the University Athletic Association of the Philippines, where she made an immediate impact and earned Rookie-MVP.

Also, she is playing as an outside hitter for the De La Salle Lady Spikers in the University Athletic Association of the Philippines and has played for the Philippines women's national Under-23 volleyball team in the 2019 Women's Volleyball Kor Royal Cup held in Thailand.

== Early life & Education ==
Canino was born in Bacolod to volleyball coach parents. She studied at Bacolod Tay Tung High School then transferred to De La Salle Santiago Zobel School to play in the UAAP girls' volleyball division. She is currently taking a degree in American Studies at De La Salle University.

== Career ==
=== Secondary school ===
Prior to joining De La Salle Zobel, a 14-year-old Angel Canino won in the 2018 Palarong Pambansa girls' secondary volleyball finals with the NCR team defeating Calabarzon and taking home the MVP award.

=== High school ===
With the Zobel Junior Lady Archers, Canino was awarded as a one-time Seasons MVP in Season 81 where she clinched an historic UAAP juniors title, ending NU's four-year reign in girls' volleyball and was granted two Best Outside Hitter distinctions in that same season.

=== College ===
In 2023, Canino debuted in Season 85 with the De La Salle Lady Spikers (DLSU) in the UAAP women's volleyball division.

In her rookie season, Canino made history winning her inaugural UAAP championship defeating NU in the finals, and became the second rookie, only after Mhicaela Belen to claim the Seasons MVP award and the Rookie of the Year title simultaneously, becoming what is known as a "Rookie-MVP".

In Season 86, Canino suffered a right forearm injury at the tail-end of the elimination round. Nevertheless, Canino clinched bronze after DLSU yielded to UST in the Final Four.

In 2025, Canino captained DLSU all the way to the Season 87 finals, avenging last-years defeat to UST, prevailing in their Final Four matchup. Although losing to NU in the finals, Canino bagged the 2nd Best Outside Spiker award.

In her senior year for DLSU, Canino conquered Season 88 in 2026 for a flawless 16–0 record sweeping NU in the finals series, reclaiming the UAAP crown and winning back-to-back 2nd Best Outside Spiker awards.

Canino announced she will play her final eligible year for DLSU in Season 89.

=== National team ===
She played twice for the junior national team in 2019 Women's Volleyball Kor Royal Cup and placed silver in the 2019 ASEAN School Games.

In 2024, she debuted for the senior national team in the 2024 Asian Women's Volleyball Challenge Cup, where the Philippines finished as bronze medalists and achieved its first podium finish in any Asian Volleyball Confederation tournament. The following year, the Philippines achieved its highest AVC placement, with a silver medal-finish in the 2025 AVC Women's Volleyball Nations Cup. In each tournament, Canino was awarded as the Best Opposite Spiker and one of the Best Outside Spikers, respectively.

Amidst disputes involving the PNVF, Canino, alongside Lasallian teammates Amie Provido and Shevana Laput begged off from national team duties in 2026.

However, after PNVF's suspensions and the POC being appointed to manage the national team, Canino along with Provido was called up for the upcoming SEA V Cup (formerly known as the SEA V.League) and 2026 Asian Games.

== Awards ==
=== Individual ===
Year	Tournament	Award	Ref.
2017	UAAP Season 80 Girls' Volleyball Tournament	2nd Best Outside Spiker	
2018	Palarong Pambansa Volleyball Tournament	Most Valuable Player	
2018	UAAP Season 81 Girls' Volleyball Tournament	Season's Most Valuable Player	
2018	UAAP Season 81 Girls' Volleyball Tournament	1st Best Outside Spiker	
2022	Shakey's Super League Collegiate Pre-Season Championship	1st Best Outside Spiker	
2023	UAAP Season 85 Women's Volleyball Tournament	Season's Most Valuable Player	
2023	UAAP Season 85 Women's Volleyball Tournament	Rookie of the Year	
2023	UAAP Season 85 Women's Volleyball Tournament	2nd Best Outside Spiker	
2024	Asian Women's Volleyball Challenge Cup	Best Opposite Spiker	
2025	UAAP Season 87 Women's Volleyball Tournament	2nd Best Outside Spiker	
2025	AVC Women's Volleyball Nations Cup	Best Outside Spiker	
2025	SEA Women's V.League – Leg 1	Best Outside Spiker	
2026	UAAP Season 88 Women's Volleyball Tournament	2nd Best Outside Spiker	

=== Highschool ===
- 2018 UAAP Season 80 volleyball girls’ tournament – Bronze medal, with DLSZ Junior Lady Archers
- 2019 UAAP Season 81 volleyball girls’ tournament – Champion, with DLSZ Junior Lady Archers

=== Collegiate ===
- 2022 2022 Shakey's Super League Collegiate Pre-Season Championship – Silver medal, with DLSU Lady Spikers
- 2023 UAAP Season 85 volleyball women's tournament – Champion, with DLSU Lady Spikers
- 2024 UAAP Season 86 volleyball women's tournament – Bronze medal, with DLSU Lady Spikers
- 2024 2024 Shakey's Super League Pre-season Championship – Silver medal, with DLSU Lady Spikers
- 2025 UAAP Season 87 volleyball women's Tournament – Silver medal, with DLSU Lady Spikers
- 2026 UAAP Season 88 volleyball women's Tournament – Champion, with DLSU Lady Spikers

=== National team ===
- 2019 2019 ASEAN School Games - Silver medal, with Philippines U23 team
- 2024 2024 AVC Women's Challenge Cup – Bronze medal, with Alas Pilipinas
- 2025 2025 AVC Women's Challenge Cup - Silver medal, with Alas Pilipinas
- 2025 2025 SEA Women's V.League - Bronze medal, with Alas Pilipinas
