= Celine Domingo =

Filipino volleyball player (born 1999)

Personal information
- Full name: Celine Elaiza B. Domingo
- Nickname: Ced
- Nationality: Filipino
- Born: April 20, 1999 (age 27); Quezon City, Philippines
- Height: 175 cm (5 ft 9 in)
- Weight: 60 kg (132 lb)
- Education: University of the East; Far Eastern University

Volleyball information
- Position: Middle Blocker
- Current club: Akari Chargers
- Number: 13

Career
Years	Teams
2019–2023	Creamline Cool Smashers
2023	Nakhon Ratchasima QminC VC
2024–present	Akari Chargers

National team
2023; 2019	Philippines (SEAG); Philippines (U23)

Celine Elaiza Domingo (born April 20, 1999) is a Filipino volleyball player who currently plays for the Akari Chargers in the Premier Volleyball League. She was the team captain of the Philippines women's national under-23 volleyball team that competed in the 2019 Women's Volleyball Kor Royal Cup held in Thailand.

== Personal life ==
Domingo was formerly in a relationship with then-UP Lady Fighting Maroons and Creamline player Tots Carlos.

== Collegiate career ==
Domingo initially joined the UE Red Warriors as its rookie captain during UAAP Season 78 in 2015 but later transferred to the Far Eastern University due to personal reasons. She began playing for the FEU Lady Tamaraws in 2018 after completing her residency. She foregoed her final year of eligibility in 2020. Domingo took a degree in Tourism in FEU.

== Club career ==
Domingo joined the Premier Volleyball League (PVL) in 2019 as a player for the Creamline Cool Smashers. She also led the Philippines women's national under-23 volleyball team as its captain during the 2019 Women's Volleyball Kor Royal Cup in Thailand in July 2019. In October 2023, she took leave from Creamline to play for Nakhon Ratchasima VC in Thailand. Following the end of her overseas stint, she officially left Creamline in January 2024 and transferred to a rival PVL team, the Akari Chargers.

== Clubs ==
- (Philippines) PayMaya High Flyers (2018)
- (Philippines) Smart Giga Hitters (2018)
- (Philippines) Creamline Cool Smashers (2019–2023)
- (Philippines) Philippine National Team (2019–2023)
- (Thailand) Nakhon Ratchasima VC (2023)
- (Philippines) Akari Chargers (2024–present)

== Awards ==
=== Individual ===
- 2018 UAAP Season 80 "Best Blocker"
- 2018 Premier Volleyball League Collegiate Conference "1st Best Middle Blocker"
- 2022 Premier Volleyball League Invitational Conference "Final's Most Valuable Player"
- 2023 Premier Volleyball League Invitational Conference "2nd Best Middle Blocker"

=== Collegiate team ===
- 2017 Premier Volleyball League Collegiate Conference – runner-Up, with FEU Tamaraws
- UAAP Season 80 volleyball tournaments – runner-Up, with FEU Tamaraws
- 2018 Premier Volleyball League Collegiate Conference – runner-Up, with FEU Tamaraws
- UAAP Season 81 volleyball tournaments – Bronze medal, with FEU Tamaraws

=== Club team ===
- 2019 Premier Volleyball League Reinforced Conference – runner-Up, with Creamline Cool Smashers
- 2019 Premier Volleyball League Open Conference – champion, with Creamline Cool Smashers
- 2021 Premier Volleyball League Open Conference – runner-Up, with Creamline Cool Smashers
- 2022 Premier Volleyball League Open Conference – champion, with Creamline Cool Smashers
- 2022 Premier Volleyball League Invitational Conference – champion, with Creamline Cool Smashers
- 2022 Premier Volleyball League Reinforced Conference – Bronze medal, with Creamline Cool Smashers
- 2023 Premier Volleyball League All-Filipino Conference – champion, with Creamline Cool Smashers
- 2023 Premier Volleyball League Invitational Conference – runner-Up, with Creamline Cool Smashers
- 2023–24 Thailand League – champion, with Nakhon Ratchasima QminC VC
- 2024 Premier Volleyball League Reinforced Conference – runner-Up, with Akari Chargers
