= UAAP Season 87 volleyball tournaments =

Volleyball tournaments

UAAP Season 87
- Stronger, Better, Together
- Host school: University of the Philippines (Collegiate); University of Santo Tomas (High School)
Men's Finals	G1	G2	G3	Wins
FEU Tamaraws	3	2	0	1
NU Bulldogs	2	3	3	2
- Duration: May 11–17, 2025
- Arenas: Araneta Coliseum (Game 1); SM Mall of Asia Arena (Game 2 & 3)
- Finals MVP: Leo Aringo
- Winning coach: Dante Alinsunurin
- Semifinalists: UST Golden Spikers; De La Salle Green Spikers
- TV networks: One Sports; UAAP Varsity Channel; RPTV
Women's Finals	G1	G2	Wins
NU Lady Bulldogs	3	3	2
De La Salle Lady Spikers	1	0	0
- Duration: May 11–14, 2025
- Arenas: Araneta Coliseum (Game 1); SM Mall of Asia Arena (Game 2)
- Finals MVP: Evangeline Alinsug & Shaira Jardio
- Winning coach: Sherwin Meneses
- Semifinalists: UST Golden Tigresses; FEU Lady Tamaraws
- TV networks: One Sports; UAAP Varsity Channel
Boys' Finals	G1	G2	Wins
UST Tiger Cubs	3	3	2
NUNS Bullpups	1	0	0
- Duration: December 4–7, 2024
- Arena: UST Quadricentennial Pavilion
- Finals MVP: Kalel Legaspi
- Winning coach: Clarence Esteban
- Semifinalists: UE Junior Red Warriors; Adamson Baby Falcons
Girls' Finals	G1	G2	Wins
NUNS Lady Bullpups	3	3	2
Adamson Lady Baby Falcons	0	0	0
- Duration: December 4–7, 2024
- Arena: UST Quadricentennial Pavilion
- Finals MVP: Harlyn Serneche
- Winning coach: Ray Karl Dimaculangan
- Semifinalists: UST Junior Tigresses; FEU–D Lady Baby Tamaraws

The UAAP Season 87 volleyball tournaments is the University Athletic Association of the Philippines (UAAP) volleyball tournaments for the 2024–25 school year.

The collegiate men's and women's tournaments began on February 15, 2025.

The high school boys' and girls' tournaments began on September 14, 2024.

== Teams ==
All eight member universities of the UAAP fielded teams in the collegiate division while 8 universities fielded teams in the boys' and girls' division, respectively.

Collegiate division
University	Men		Women	
University	Team	Coach	Team	Coach
Adamson University (AdU)	Soaring Falcons	Raffy Mosuela	Lady Falcons	JP Yude
Ateneo de Manila University (ADMU (Note: Since 2017, Ateneo de Manila University is the only member school that does not use an acronym for official communications and graphics, according to their branding guide.))	Blue Eagles	Vince Mangulabnan	Blue Eagles	Sergio Veloso
De La Salle University (DLSU)	Green Spikers	Jose Roque	Lady Spikers	Ramil De Jesus and Noel Orcullo
Far Eastern University (FEU)	Tamaraws	Eddieson Orcullo	Lady Tamaraws	Tina Salak
National University (NU)	Bulldogs	Dante Alinsunurin	Lady Bulldogs	Sherwin Meneses
University of the East (UE)	Red Warriors	Jerome Guhit	Lady Red Warriors	Allan Mendoza (interim)
University of the Philippines Diliman (UP)	Fighting Maroons	Carlo Cabatingan	Fighting Maroons	Benson Bocboc
University of Santo Tomas (UST)	Golden Spikers	Arthur Alan Mamon	Golden Tigresses	Kungfu Reyes

High School division
High school	Boys' team	Girls' team
Adamson University (AdU)	Baby Falcons	Lady Baby Falcons
Ateneo de Manila University (ADMU)	Blue Eagles	Blue Eagles
De La Salle Santiago Zobel School (DLSZ)	Junior Archers	Junior Lady Archers
Far Eastern University Diliman (FEU–D)	Baby Tamaraws	Lady Baby Tamaraws
Nazareth School of National University (NSNU)	Bullpups	Lady Bullpups
University of the East (UE)	Junior Warriors Lady Red Warriorsdata-sort-value="" style="background: var(--background-color-interactive, #ececec); color: var(--color-base, inherit); vertical-align: middle; text-align: center; " class="table-na" | —N/a	
University of the Philippines Integrated School (UPIS)	Junior Fighting Maroons	Junior Fighting Maroons
University of Santo Tomas Senior High School (UST)	Junior Golden Spikers	Junior Tigresses

=== Coaching changes ===
Team	Outgoing coach	Manner of departure	Date	Replaced by	Date
Adamson Soaring Falcons	George Pascua	Fired	September 15, 2024	Raffy Mosuela	October 8, 2024
Ateneo Blue Eagles	Timothy James Sto. Tomas	Fired	June 15, 2024	Vince Mangulabnan	July 7, 2024
UP Fighting Maroons	Sergio Isada	Fired	October 18, 2024	Carlo Cabatingan	October 18, 2024
FEU Lady Tamaraws	Manolo Refugia	Fired	August 9, 2025	Tina Salak	August 14, 2025
NU Lady Bulldogs	Norman Miguel	Resigned	August 8, 2024	Sherwin Meneses	August 18, 2025
UP Fighting Maroons	Oliver Almadro	Fired	October 18, 2024	Benson Bocboc	October 18, 2024
UE Lady Red Warriors	Obet Vital	Resigned	December 16, 2024	Allan Mendoza	January 27, 2025

== Men's tournament ==
=== Team line-up ===
Adamson Soaring Falcons
No.	Name	Position
1	Aguilar, Jude Christian	MB
2	Canlas, Lorences	L
3	Gutierrez, Dan Russel	OH
4	Ballon, Jason Paolo	MB
5	Menor, Joel	OH
6	Bermudez, Francis Jhome	OP
7	Gay, John Eugenio (c)	OH
8	Coguimbal, Mark Leo	MB
11	Domingo, Ronn Lourenz	S
12	Paulino, Marc Kenneth	MB/OP
18	Obeda, Ricardo Jr.	S
22	Hitones, John Willie	OP
23	Tahiluddin, Ahmed Vezie	OH
24	Cuadra, Arnhil	L
	MOSUELA, Raffy	HC

Ateneo Blue Eagles
No.	Name	Position
3	Gutierrez, Lorenzo Samuel	S
4	Gopio, Jettlee	MB
5	Batas, Kennedy	OH
8	Pacinio, Amil Jr.	OP
9	Reyes, Karl Emerzone	OH
11	Taluban, Eijra Kayelle	S
13	De Castro, Lance Andrei (c)	L
14	Yu, Julio Miguel	OP
16	Almadro, Andrei John	OH
17	Sendon, Jeric	MB
18	Salarzon, Jian Matthew	OH
19	Quijano, Christian David	L
23	Castro, Joseph Brian	MB
24	Corregidor, Karl Geneliez	OP
	MANGULABNAN, Vincent	HC

De La Salle Green Spikers
No.	Name	Position
1	Mendoza, Uriel	OH
2	Guerrero, Menard (c)	L
4	Magallanes, Arjay	OP
5	Adajar, Jerico	S
7	Layug, Eric Paolo	MB
8	Poquita, Diogenes III	S
9	Kampton, Noel Michael	OH
12	Fortuna, Michael John	OP
13	Del Pilar, Nathaniel	MB
16	De Castro, Jonathan	L
17	Maglinao, Vince Gerard	OH
18	Hernandez, Chris Emmanuel	OH
20	Ventura, Glen Rui	OP
24	Rodriguez, Joshua Jamiel	MB
	ROQUE, Jose	HC

FEU Tamaraws
No.	Name	Position
1	Ceballos, Vennie Paul	L
3	Cacao, Ariel	S
4	De Guzman, Raymond Bryce	L
5	Espartero, Mikko	OH
6	Tandoc, Kyle Clarence	OH
8	Talisayan, Jelord (c)	OH
9	Saavedra, Zhydryx	OP
11	Mendoza, Lirick John	MB
14	Du-ot, Rhodson	OH
15	Ndongala, Doula	MB
17	Martinez, Benny	S
19	Bituin, Amet Samuel	OP
22	Absin, Charles David	MB
25	Miguel, Luis Michael	OH
	ORCULLO, Eddieson	HC

NU Bulldogs
No.	Name	Position
2	Ancheta, Greg Augustus Luis	S
3	Gallego, Jeffe Jr.	S
4	Bandola, Mac Alvin	OH
5	Abanilla, Jan Lanfred	OP
6	Buddin, Michaelo	OH
10	Mukaba, Obed	MB
11	Disquitado, Jade Alex	OH
12	Taguibolos, Rwenzmel	MB
14	Ordiales, Leo	OP
15	Hernandez, Michael Jonas	MB
17	Gapultos, Jimwell	L
18	Aringo, Leo Jr. (c)	OH
19	Parreno, John Kade	L
23	Diao, Jenngerard Arnfranz	MB
	ALINSUNURIN, Dante	HC

UE Red Warriors
No.	Name	Position
2	Aceron, Raquim Joefe	OH
3	Pozas, Joshua	OP
4	Camaymayan, Xjhann Viandre (c)	MB
5	Maglay, Jhon Stewart	OH
6	Poquita, Dave Harold	S
7	Aligayon, John Steven	OH
10	Lascuña, Kart Philip	MB
11	Villanueva, Joshua Rey	L
12	Bicar, Joseph Andre	S
13	Defeo, Axel	MB
15	Piojo, Roy Gabriel	OH
17	Sison, Rayven Camerone	OP
19	Ledesma, Mart Andrew	L
20	Roca, Isaiah Jhon	OH
	GUHIT, Jerome	HC

UP Fighting Maroons
No.	Name	Position
1	Samaniego, Gian Carlo (c)	S
2	Santiago, Clarence	S
3	Bersano, Niño Nikko	L
4	Clemente, Brndy	OH/OP
4	Nicolas, Daniel	MB
7	Lagando, Angelo	OP
8	Castrodes, Tommy	OH
9	Aballe, Louise Angelo	S
13	De Guzman, Marlon Janry	OH
15	Francisco, Milven Jr.	MB
17	Raheem, Olayemi	OP
18	Aca-ac, Kobe Klien	OP
21	Lipata, Angelo	MB
22	Sotto, Justine John	L
	CABATINGAN, Carlo	HC

UST Golden Spikers
No.	Name	Position
1	De Vega, Rey Miguel	OH
3	Yamanaka, Ryuichi Isaiah	
5	Macam, Jan Julian	OH
7	Yambao, Dux Euan (c)	S
8	Colinares, Edlyn Paul	MB
9	Avila, Joshua	S
10	De La Noche, Jay Rack	OP
11	Prudenciado, Nathaniel	L
12	Alabar, Edriel	L
13	Ybañez, Josh	OH
14	Valera, Trevor	MB
18	Sali, Al-Bhukarie	OP
22	Gupiteo, Alche	OH
23	Catinsag, John Vryvin	
	MAMON, Arthur Alan	HC

Legend
S	Setter
MB	Middle Blocker
OH	Outside Hitter
OP	Opposite Hitter
L	Libero
(c)	Team Captain
HC	Head coach

=== Elimination round ===
==== Team standings ====
Pos	Team	Pld	W	L	Pts	SW	SL	SR	SPW	SPL	SPR	Qualification
1	FEU Tamaraws	14	13	1	39	41	11	3.727	1252	1091	1.148	Twice-to-beat in the semifinals
2	NU Bulldogs	14	12	2	34	37	16	2.313	1236	1126	1.098	Twice-to-beat in the semifinals
3	UST Golden Spikers	14	9	5	27	31	16	1.938	1213	980	1.238	Twice-to-win in the semifinals
4	De La Salle Green Spikers	14	9	5	25	30	23	1.304	1230	1182	1.041	Twice-to-win in the semifinals
5	Ateneo Blue Eagles	14	7	7	21	27	27	1.000	1264	1228	1.029	
6	UP Fighting Maroons (H)	14	4	10	12	20	36	0.556	1123	1289	0.871	
7	Adamson Soaring Falcons	14	2	12	7	14	39	0.359	1091	1220	0.894	
8	UE Red Warriors	14	0	14	3	10	42	0.238	1058	1251	0.846	

Source: UAAP Volleyball on Livestats
Rules for classification: 1) win percentage; 2) if tied for No. 2 or 4, one-game playoff; 3) match points; 4) sets ratio; 5) points ratio; 6) head-to-head record
(H) Host

==== Match-up results ====
	Round 1							Round 2						
Team ╲ Game	1	2	3	4	5	6	7	8	9	10	11	12	13	14
Adamson	Ateneo school colors	La Salle school colors	UE school colors	UST school colors	FEU school colors	NU school colors	UP school colors	UE school colors	Ateneo school colors	UST school colors	NU school colors	FEU school colors	La Salle school colors	UP school colors
Ateneo	Adamson school colors	NU school colors	UP school colors	FEU school colors	UST school colors	La Salle school colors	UE school colors	UP school colors	Adamson school colors	La Salle school colors	UST school colors	FEU school colors	NU school colors	UE school colors
La Salle	NU school colors	Adamson school colors	UST school colors	UP school colors	UE school colors	Ateneo school colors	FEU school colors	NU school colors	UST school colors	Ateneo school colors	UE school colors	UP school colors	Adamson school colors	FEU school colors
FEU	UST school colors	UP school colors	NU school colors	Ateneo school colors	UE school colors	Adamson school colors	La Salle school colors	UST school colors	UE school colors	NU school colors	UP school colors	Ateneo school colors	Adamson school colors	La Salle school colors
NU	La Salle school colors	Ateneo school colors	FEU school colors	UE school colors	UP school colors	Adamson school colors	UST school colors	La Salle school colors	UP school colors	FEU school colors	Adamson school colors	UE school colors	Ateneo school colors	UST school colors
UE	UP school colors	UST school colors	Adamson school colors	NU school colors	FEU school colors	La Salle school colors	Ateneo school colors	Adamson school colors	FEU school colors	UP school colors	La Salle school colors	NU school colors	UST school colors	Ateneo school colors
UP	UE school colors	FEU school colors	Ateneo school colors	La Salle school colors	UST school colors	NU school colors	Adamson school colors	Ateneo school colors	NU school colors	UE school colors	FEU school colors	La Salle school colors	UST school colors	Adamson school colors
UST	FEU school colors	UE school colors	La Salle school colors	Adamson school colors	UP school colors	Ateneo school colors	NU school colors	FEU school colors	La Salle school colors	Adamson school colors	Ateneo school colors	UE school colors	UP school colors	NU school colors

= Win; = Loss

==== Game results ====
Results on top and to the right of the solid cells are for first-round games; those to the bottom and left are for second-round games.

Teams	AdU	ADMU	DLSU	FEU	NU	UE	UP	UST
Adamson Soaring Falcons		1–3	0–3	0–3	2–3	3–1	1–3	0–3
Ateneo Blue Eagles	3–1		1–3	1–3	1–3	3–0	3–1	3–1
De La Salle Green Spikers	3–1	3–2		1–3	0–3	3–0	3–1	0–3
FEU Tamaraws	3–0	3–1	3–1		3–0	3–0	3–0	3–1
NU Bulldogs	3–0	3–0	1–3	3–2		3–1	3–1	3–1
UE Red Warriors	2–3	2–3	0–3	1–3	0–3		2–3	0–3
UP Fighting Maroons	3–2	0–3	2–3	2–3	1–3	3–1		0–3
UST Golden Spikers	3–0	3–0	3–1	0–3	1–3	3–0	3–0	

Legend: Blue = left column team win; Red = top row team win.

=== Bracket ===
Semifinals (Nos. 1 & 2 have twice-to-beat advantage)
1	FEU	3
4	La Salle	1
2	NU	1	3
3	UST	3	0

Finals (Best-of-three playoff)
1	FEU	3	2	0
2	NU	2	3	3

=== Semifinals ===
FEU and NU have the twice-to-beat advantage. They only need to win once while their opponents twice in order to qualify in the Finals.

==== FEU vs. La Salle ====
May 3, 2025; 12:00 NN (UTC+8:00)	FEU Tamaraws	3–1	De La Salle Green Spikers	Araneta Coliseum, Quezon City; Attendance: 5,000+
May 3, 2025; 12:00 NN (UTC+8:00)	(24–26, 25–23, 25–19, 25–20); Report			Araneta Coliseum, Quezon City; Attendance: 5,000+
May 3, 2025; 12:00 NN (UTC+8:00)	FEU wins series in one game			Araneta Coliseum, Quezon City; Attendance: 5,000+

==== NU vs. UST ====
May 3, 2025; 10:00 AM (UTC+8:00)	NU Bulldogs	1–3	UST Golden Spikers	Araneta Coliseum, Quezon City; Attendance: 5,000+
May 3, 2025; 10:00 AM (UTC+8:00)	(24–26, 25–27, 25–19, 18–25); Report			Araneta Coliseum, Quezon City; Attendance: 5,000+

May 7, 2025; 2:00 PM (UTC+8:00)	NU Bulldogs	3-0	UST Golden Spikers	Araneta Coliseum, Quezon City; Attendance: 5,000+
May 7, 2025; 2:00 PM (UTC+8:00)	(25–23, 25–23, 25–23); Report			Araneta Coliseum, Quezon City; Attendance: 5,000+
May 7, 2025; 2:00 PM (UTC+8:00)	NU wins series in two games			Araneta Coliseum, Quezon City; Attendance: 5,000+

=== Finals ===
The finals is a best-of-three series. Game 3 of the series was also officially the most attended UAAP men's volleyball game in the league's history with 14,517 spectators.

May 11, 2025; 1:00 PM (UTC+8:00)	FEU Tamaraws	3–2	NU Bulldogs	Araneta Coliseum, Quezon City; Attendance: 5,200; Referees: Jastin Cruz & Jason Magat
May 11, 2025; 1:00 PM (UTC+8:00)	(22–25, 25–22, 13–25, 25–22, 15–13); Report			Araneta Coliseum, Quezon City; Attendance: 5,200; Referees: Jastin Cruz & Jason Magat

May 14, 2025; 1:00 PM (UTC+8:00)	FEU Tamaraws	2–3	NU Bulldogs	SM Mall of Asia Arena, Pasay City; Attendance: 9,977; Referees: Philip Nunez & Camille Abanto
May 14, 2025; 1:00 PM (UTC+8:00)	(20–25, 25–22, 15–25, 25–18, 11–15); Report			SM Mall of Asia Arena, Pasay City; Attendance: 9,977; Referees: Philip Nunez & Camille Abanto

May 17, 2025; 1:00 PM (UTC+8:00)	FEU Tamaraws	0–3	NU Bulldogs	SM Mall of Asia Arena, Pasay City; Attendance: 14,517; Referees: Jastin Cruz & Jason Magat
May 17, 2025; 1:00 PM (UTC+8:00)	(16–25, 26–28, 23–25); Report			SM Mall of Asia Arena, Pasay City; Attendance: 14,517; Referees: Jastin Cruz & Jason Magat
May 17, 2025; 1:00 PM (UTC+8:00)	NU wins series, 2–1			SM Mall of Asia Arena, Pasay City; Attendance: 14,517; Referees: Jastin Cruz & Jason Magat

- Finals Most Valuable Player: Leo Aringo (NU Bulldogs)

=== Awards ===
UAAP Season 87 men's volleyball champions
NU Bulldogs
Seventh title, fifth consecutive title

The awards were handed out prior to Game 2 of the Finals at the SM Mall of Asia Arena.

- Most Valuable Player: Kennedy Batas (Ateneo Blue Eagles)
- Rookie of the Year: Jan Julian Macam (UST Golden Spikers)
- 1st Best Outside Spiker: Kennedy Batas (Ateneo Blue Eagles)
- 2nd Best Outside Spiker: Jan Julian Macam (UST Golden Spikers)
- 1st Best Middle Blocker: Edlyn Paul Colinares (UST Golden Spikers)
- 2nd Best Middle Blocker: Mark Leo Coguimbal (Adamson Soaring Falcons)
- Best Opposite Spiker: Amil Pacinio Jr. (Ateneo Blue Eagles)
- Best Setter: Dux Euan Yambao (UST Golden Spikers)
- Best Libero: Menard Guerrero (De La Salle Green Spikers)

==== Players of the Week ====
The Collegiate Press Corps awards a "player of the week" for performances on the preceding week.

Week	Player	Team	Ref.
Week 1	Zhydryx Saavedra	FEU Tamaraws	
Week 2	Edlyn Paul Colinares	UST Golden Spikers	
Week 3	Kennedy Batas	Ateneo Blue Eagles	
Week 4	Mikko Espartero	FEU Tamaraws	
Week 5	Michaelo Buddin	NU Bulldogs	
Week 6	Joshua Ybañez	UST Golden Spikers	
Week 7	Amet Bituin	FEU Tamaraws	
Week 8	Ariel Cacao	FEU Tamaraws	

== Women's tournament ==
=== Team line-up ===
Adamson Lady Falcons
No.	Name	Position
1	Nitura, Shaina Marie (c)	OH
3	Villegas, Jen Kylene	MB
4	Dote, Princess Eloisa	MB
6	Nuique, May Ann	OP
9	Sapienza, Maria Ysabella Francesca	S
10	Dionisio, Kamille	MB
11	Demontano, Trixie	MB
12	Manuel, Juris Anne Clare	L
13	Mordi, Frances Ifeoma	OH
14	Sagaysay, Felicity Marie	S
15	Juegos, Ayesha Tara	OP
16	Bascon, Red	OH
17	Jamili, Jimy Jean	OH
19	Aposaga, Althea Jamine	L
	YUDE, John Philip	HC

Ateneo Blue Eagles
No.	Name	Position
5	Cortez, Katherine Shaine	S
6	Pacia, Zey Mitzi	OP
7	Buena, Sophia Beatriz	OH
8	Sulit, Yvana Avik	MB
9	Fujimoto, Takako	S
11	Tsunashima, Geezel May	OP
12	Chuatico, Jihan Isabelle	MB
13	Silla, Robielle Angela	MB
14	Miner, Alexis Ciarra	OP
15	Montoro, Alexia Marie	OH
16	De Guzman, Lyann Marie Loise (c)	OH
19	Arroyo, Fiona Marie	L
22	Hugo, Sarah Yzobelle	L
	VELOSO, Sergio	HC

De La Salle Lady Spikers
No.	Name	Position
4	Rodriguez, Francesca Sofia	L
5	De Leon, Lyka May	L
6	Malaluan, Alleiah Jan	OH
7	Laput, Shevana Maria Nicola	OP
8	Ordiales, Ma. Jessa	MB
9	Raagas, Ela Marjanna	S
10	Reyes, Mikole	S
11	Reterta, Mary Shane	OH
12	Canino, Angel Anne (c)	OH
13	Tolentino, Julyana	S
15	Provido, Amie	MB
16	Soreño, Baby Jyne	OP
18	Santos, Jillian Hayley	OH
22	Del Castillo, Katrina	MB
	DE JESUS, Ramil	HC

FEU Lady Tamaraws
No.	Name	Position
1	Bakanke, Faida	OP
2	Pons, Melody	OH
5	Ubaldo, Christine (c)	S
6	Lopez, Lovely Rose	MB
8	Panangin, Mitzi	MB
9	Tagaod, Chenie	OH
10	Loresco, Clarisse	OH
11	Miranda, Karyll	S
13	Devosora, Alyzza Gaile	OP
15	Petallo, Gerzel Mary	OH
17	Encarnacion, Margarett Louise	L
19	Asis, Jean	MB
20	Monares, Julianne	L
21	Ellarina, Jazlyn Anne	MB
	SALAK, Cristina	HC

NU Lady Bulldogs
No.	Name	Position
3	Pono, Abegail	S
4	Belen, Mhicaela (c)	OH
5	Jardio, Shaira Mae	L
6	Alinsug, Evangeline	OH
8	Toring, Sheena Angela	MB
9	Bello, Aishat	MB
10	Mata, Alexa Nichole	MB
12	Solomon, Alyssa Jae	OP
13	Lamina, Camilla Victoria	S
14	Pangilinan, Erin May	MB
17	Maaya, Minierva	MB
18	Panique, Arah Ella	OH
19	Marsh, Celine Elizabeth	OH
20	Cepada, Lc	L
	MENESES, Sherwin	HC

UE Lady Red Warriors
No.	Name	Position
1	Cepada, Kc	OH
2	Balingit, Kayce (c)	OH
3	Ecalla, Mary Christine	S
9	Ginoo, Lauritz	S
11	Famulagan, Keshia Marie	MB
12	Bangayan, Vanessa Karzai	OP
13	Enriquez, Roan Jane	MB
14	Cañete, Ashley	OP
16	Zamudio, Beatrice Anne	OH
19	Nogales, Riza	MB
20	Reyes, Angelica	L
	MENDOZA, Allan	HC

UP Fighting Maroons
No.	Name	Position
1	Manguilimotan, Jaz	S
2	Capistrano, Geisha Niccaleigh	L
3	Ysulan, Alijah Marie	L
6	Olango, Kianne Louise	OP
7	Celis, Ma. Dannica (c)	MB
8	Monares, Joan Marie	OH
9	Ytang, Niña	MB
10	Jaboneta, Irah Anika	OH
11	Cabasac, Kryzten Annikha	OH
12	Doering, Kassandra Thalia	MB
13	Bansil, Bienne Louis	MB
17	De Leon, Julia Annika	S
19	Lauchengco, Denise Arich Grace	OP
20	Noceja, Yesha	OH
	BOCBOC, Benson	HC

UST Golden Tigresses
No.	Name	Position
3	Knop, Ashlee Dianne	OP
4	Pepito, Ma. Bernadett (c)	L
7	Hilongo, Maribeth	OH
8	Altea, Margaret	OH
11	Abbu, Athena Sophia	MB
14	Escober, Sandrine Victoria	L
16	Carballo, Ma. Cassandra Rae	S
17	Poyos, Angeline	OH
18	Jurado, Regina Grace	OP
20	Banagua, Mary Margaret	MB
21	Cordora, Kyla Elvi Dale	OH
22	Plaza, Bianca Mikaela Julia	MB
23	Waje, Arlene	S
25	Unekwe, Blessing Ezinne	MB
	REYES, Emilio Jr.	HC

Legend
S	Setter
MB	Middle Blocker
OH	Outside Hitter
OP	Opposite Hitter
L	Libero
(c)	Team Captain
HC	Head coach

=== Elimination round ===
==== Team standings ====
Pos	Team	Pld	W	L	Pts	SW	SL	SR	SPW	SPL	SPR	Qualification
1	NU Lady Bulldogs	14	12	2	34	39	14	2.786	1256	1032	1.217	Twice-to-beat in the semifinals
2	De La Salle Lady Spikers	14	9 (Note: Second seed playoff: La Salle 3–1 UST)	5	27	33	22	1.500	1247	1132	1.102	Twice-to-beat in the semifinals
3	UST Golden Tigresses	14	9	5	28	35	22	1.591	1273	1186	1.073	Twice-to-win in the semifinals
4	FEU Lady Tamaraws	14	9	5	27	32	23	1.391	1257	1196	1.051	Twice-to-win in the semifinals
5	Adamson Lady Falcons	14	6	8	20	26	28	0.929	1141	1172	0.974	
6	UP Fighting Maroons (H)	14	6	8	15	23	33	0.697	1176	1267	0.928	
7	Ateneo Blue Eagles	14	5	9	15	21	32	0.656	1103	1202	0.918	
8	UE Lady Red Warriors	14	0	14	2	7	42	0.167	917	1183	0.775	

Source: UAAP Volleyball on Livestats
Rules for classification: 1) win percentage; 2) if tied for No. 2 or 4, one-game playoff; 3) match points; 4) sets ratio; 5) points ratio; 6) head-to-head record
(H) Host

==== Match-up results ====
	Round 1							Round 2						
Team ╲ Game	1	2	3	4	5	6	7	8	9	10	11	12	13	14
Adamson	Ateneo school colors	La Salle school colors	UE school colors	UST school colors	FEU school colors	NU school colors	UP school colors	UE school colors	Ateneo school colors	UST school colors	NU school colors	FEU school colors	La Salle school colors	UP school colors
Ateneo	Adamson school colors	NU school colors	UP school colors	FEU school colors	UST school colors	La Salle school colors	UE school colors	UP school colors	Adamson school colors	La Salle school colors	UST school colors	FEU school colors	NU school colors	UE school colors
La Salle	NU school colors	Adamson school colors	UST school colors	UP school colors	UE school colors	Ateneo school colors	FEU school colors	NU school colors	UST school colors	Ateneo school colors	UE school colors	UP school colors	Adamson school colors	FEU school colors
FEU	UST school colors	UP school colors	NU school colors	Ateneo school colors	UE school colors	Adamson school colors	La Salle school colors	UST school colors	UE school colors	NU school colors	UP school colors	Ateneo school colors	Adamson school colors	La Salle school colors
NU	La Salle school colors	Ateneo school colors	FEU school colors	UE school colors	UP school colors	Adamson school colors	UST school colors	La Salle school colors	UP school colors	FEU school colors	Adamson school colors	UE school colors	Ateneo school colors	UST school colors
UE	UP school colors	UST school colors	Adamson school colors	NU school colors	FEU school colors	La Salle school colors	Ateneo school colors	Adamson school colors	FEU school colors	UP school colors	La Salle school colors	NU school colors	UST school colors	Ateneo school colors
UP	UE school colors	FEU school colors	Ateneo school colors	La Salle school colors	UST school colors	NU school colors	Adamson school colors	Ateneo school colors	NU school colors	UE school colors	FEU school colors	La Salle school colors	UST school colors	Adamson school colors
UST	FEU school colors	UE school colors	La Salle school colors	Adamson school colors	UP school colors	Ateneo school colors	NU school colors	FEU school colors	La Salle school colors	Adamson school colors	Ateneo school colors	UE school colors	UP school colors	NU school colors

Source: UAAP Volleyball on Livestats
= Win; = Loss

==== Game results ====
Results on top and to the right of the solid cells are for first-round games; those to the bottom and left are for second-round games.

Teams	AdU	ADMU	DLSU	FEU	NU	UE	UP	UST
Adamson Lady Falcons		3–2	0–3	1–3	0–3	3–0	2–3	1–3
Ateneo Blue Eagles	3–0		1–3	2–3	0–3	3–2	3–0	0–3
De La Salle Lady Spikers	3–2	3–0		3–0	0–3	3–1	3–1	2–3
FEU Lady Tamaraws	1–3	3–1	3–1		2–3	3–0	1–3	3–1
NU Lady Bulldogs	1–3	3–0	3–1	3–1		3–0	3–0	3–2
UE Lady Red Warriors	0–3	1–3	0–3	0–3	0–3		2–3	1–3
UP Fighting Maroons	0–3	2–3	3–2	1–3	3–2	3–0		1–3
UST Golden Tigresses	3–2	3–0	2–3	1–3	2–3	3–0	3–0	

Source: UAAP Volleyball on Livestats
Legend: Blue = left column team win; Red = top row team win.

=== Second seed playoff ===
UST and La Salle, which are tied at second place, played for the #2 seed and the twice–to–beat advantage.

April 30, 2025; 2:00 PM (UTC+8:00)	UST Golden Tigresses	1–3	De La Salle Lady Spikers	SM Mall of Asia Arena, Pasay City; Attendance: 10,000+
April 30, 2025; 2:00 PM (UTC+8:00)	(25–23, 20–25, 28–30, 27–29); Report			SM Mall of Asia Arena, Pasay City; Attendance: 10,000+
April 30, 2025; 2:00 PM (UTC+8:00)	La Salle wins the twice–to–beat advantage			SM Mall of Asia Arena, Pasay City; Attendance: 10,000+

=== Bracket ===
Semifinals (Nos. 1 & 2 have twice-to-beat advantage)
1	NU	3
4	FEU	2
2	La Salle	3
3	UST	1

Finals (Best-of-three playoff)
1	NU	3	3
2	La Salle	1	0

=== Semifinals ===
NU and La Salle have the twice-to-beat advantage. They only need to win once while their opponents twice in order to qualify in the Finals.

==== NU vs. FEU ====
May 3, 2025; 2:00 PM (UTC+8:00)	NU Lady Bulldogs	3–2	FEU Lady Tamaraws	Araneta Coliseum, Quezon City; Attendance: 10,000+
May 3, 2025; 2:00 PM (UTC+8:00)	(20–25, 22–25, 25–23, 25–14, 17–15); Report			Araneta Coliseum, Quezon City; Attendance: 10,000+
May 3, 2025; 2:00 PM (UTC+8:00)	NU wins series in one game			Araneta Coliseum, Quezon City; Attendance: 10,000+

==== La Salle vs. UST ====
May 3, 2025; 6:00 PM (UTC+8:00)	De La Salle Lady Spikers	3–1	UST Golden Tigresses	Araneta Coliseum, Quezon City; Attendance: 10,000+
May 3, 2025; 6:00 PM (UTC+8:00)	(25–22, 11–25, 25–21, 25–21); Report			Araneta Coliseum, Quezon City; Attendance: 10,000+
May 3, 2025; 6:00 PM (UTC+8:00)	La Salle wins series in one game			Araneta Coliseum, Quezon City; Attendance: 10,000+

=== Finals ===
The finals is a best-of-three series.

May 11, 2025; 5:00 PM (UTC+8:00)	NU Lady Bulldogs	3–1	De La Salle Lady Spikers	Araneta Coliseum, Quezon City; Attendance: 15,912; Referees: Camille Abanto & Philip Nunez
May 11, 2025; 5:00 PM (UTC+8:00)	(25–17, 25–21, 13–25, 25–17); Report			Araneta Coliseum, Quezon City; Attendance: 15,912; Referees: Camille Abanto & Philip Nunez

May 14, 2025; 5:00 PM (UTC+8:00)	NU Lady Bulldogs	3–0	De La Salle Lady Spikers	SM Mall of Asia Arena, Pasay City; Attendance: 18,514; Referees: Jayson Magat & Jastin Cruz
May 14, 2025; 5:00 PM (UTC+8:00)	(25–19, 25–18, 25–19); Report			SM Mall of Asia Arena, Pasay City; Attendance: 18,514; Referees: Jayson Magat & Jastin Cruz
May 14, 2025; 5:00 PM (UTC+8:00)	NU wins series, 2–0			SM Mall of Asia Arena, Pasay City; Attendance: 18,514; Referees: Jayson Magat & Jastin Cruz

- AIA Defensive Player of the Finals: Shevana Laput (De La Salle Lady Spikers)
- co-Finals Most Valuable Player: Evangeline Alinsug (NU Bulldogs) & Shaira Jardio (NU Bulldogs)

=== Awards ===
UAAP Season 87 women's volleyball champions
NU Lady Bulldogs
Fifth title, second consecutive title

The awards were handed out prior to Game 2 of the Finals at the SM Mall of Asia Arena.

- Most Valuable Player: Mhicaela Belen (NU Lady Bulldogs)
- Rookie of the Year: Shaina Nitura (Adamson Soaring Falcons)
- 1st Best Outside Spiker: Mhicaela Belen (NU Lady Bulldogs)
- 2nd Best Outside Spiker: Angel Anne Canino (De La Salle Lady Spikers)
- 1st Best Middle Blocker: Amie Provido (De La Salle Lady Spikers)
- 2nd Best Middle Blocker: Niña Ytang (UP Fighting Maroons)
- Best Opposite Spiker: Shevana Laput (De La Salle Lady Spikers)
- Best Setter: Camilla Lamina (NU Lady Bulldogs)
- Best Libero: Lyka May De Leon (De La Salle Lady Spikers)

==== Players of the Week ====
The Collegiate Press Corps awards a "player of the week" for performances on the preceding week.

Week	Player	Team	Ref.
Week 1	Camilla Lamina	NU Lady Bulldogs	
Week 2	Angeline Poyos	UST Golden Tigresses	
Week 3	Gerzel Petallo	FEU Lady Tamaraws	
Week 4	Alyssa Solomon	NU Lady Bulldogs	
Week 5	Niña Ytang	UP Fighting Maroons	
Week 6	Shaina Nitura	Adamson Lady Falcons	
Week 7	Shaina Nitura	Adamson Lady Falcons	
Week 8	Mhicaela Belen	NU Lady Bulldogs	

== Boys' tournament ==
=== Team line-up ===
Adamson Baby Falcons
No.	Name	Position
1	DINGLE, Clark Louise S.	S
2	GUEVARRA, John Ian Juris B.	L
3	DUCUSIN, Jims Reaven A.	OP
4	FLORITA, Alfred John	MB
5	OBILLO, John Mark A.	L / OH
6	CASTRODES, Tommy P.	OH
7	CLEMENTE, Brandy E.	OH
8	CUISON, Carl Andrey B.	OH / L
9	DE GUZMAN, Gabriel Jayve J.	MB
10	DOMINGUITO, Cj C.	OH
11	NACARIO, Privaldo III M.	MB
12	RAMOS, Jan Laurence G.	MB
13	SAMSON, Yuan Jon A.	OP
14	TABON, Robert Dwight A.	S / (c)
	RAMOSO, Marvin R.	HC

Ateneo Blue Eagles
No.	Name	Position
1	SINJIAN, Alfonso Santino	OH
2	GABIA, Kevin	OP
3	GARCIA, Lucas	S
6	LUNAR, Dominic Matthew	L
7	MANALASTAS, Jose Tadeo	OH
8	BAHIA, Gian Sebastian (c)	S
9	BERDOS, Mon Paquito	L
10	ABAD, Juancho	MB
11	ISRAEL, Kyan Dale	MB
14	NICOLAS, Ken Harvey	OH
15	TURQUEZA, Miguel Mariano	MB
16	AVILA, Santiago Andres	MB
17	NISPEROS, Jedric	OH
18	CASTRO, Ron Eirik	OP
	Babes Castillo	HC

DLSZ Junior Green Spikers
No.	Name	Position
1	Mario Roxas	
2	Antonio Papa	
3	Jayden Espares	
4	Ashton Dumana	
5	Floyd Marinduque	
6	Christopher Pallega	
7	Emmanuel Pegar	
8	John Talens	
9	Alessandro Baligod	
10	Mewin Capeña	
11	Kyle Aure	
12	John Dimatulac	
13	Joeniel Bergantin	
14		
	Ronilo Gacula	HC

FEU–D Baby Tamaraws
No.	Name	Position
1		
2		
3		
4		
5		
6		
7		
8		
9		
10		
11		
12		
13		
14		
		HC

NUNS Bullpups
No.	Name	Position
1	Kalel Gabriel ,Ronquillo	
2	Rolf Michael ,De Asis	
3		
4		
5		
6		
7		
8		
9		
10		
11		
12		
13		
14		
		HC

UE Junior Red Warriors
No.	Name	Position
1	MACAM, Jan Julian	
2	MANALO, Chilwu	
3	MONTEMAYOR, Xyrone	
4	BABON, Lance	
5	REYES, Karl	
6	FLESTADO, Lance	
7	ANCHETA, Aaron	
8	GIANAN, Clarence	
9	POLLENTES, Luis	
10	CUADA, Anrhil	
11	MOSUELA, Charles	
12	SUMAGAYSAY, John	
13	MOSUELA, Ralph	
14	CARO, Kenzie	
	MOSUELA, Raffy	HC

UP Fighting Maroons
No.	Name	Position
1	Lawrence Rabi	
2	JM Navarro	
3	Japhet Casabar	
4	Marco Bamba	
5	Joven Mendoza	
6	Areef Gamon	
7	Manfred Rosete	
8	Terren Villanueva	
9	Marcus Bamba	
10	Noah Parungao	
11	Zack Escalaw	
12	Raiven Pascual	
13		
14		
		HC

UST Junior Golden Spikers
No.	Name	Position
2	ESTRABON, Diego	
4	JUNIO, Alwyne	
5	ROQUE, Paul	
6	LUSTON, Gherick	
8	QUEMADA, Ace	
9	LEGASPI, Kalel (c)	
10	CRUZ, Sean	
11	ESTEBAN, Chester	
12	POJA, Ron	
13	TEHONES, Junlie	
17	PERJES, Erick	
18	MEDINO, Paolo	
21	AYCO, Joncriz	
28	MALIT, Michael	
	ESTEBAN, Clarence	HC

Legend
S	Setter
MB	Middle Blocker
OH	Outside Hitter
OP	Opposite Hitter
L	Libero
(c)	Team Captain
HC	Head coach

=== Elimination round ===
==== Team standings ====
Pos	Team	Pld	W	L	Pts	SW	SL	SR	SPW	SPL	SPR	Qualification
1	UST Junior Golden Spikers (H)	14	13	1	40	41	7	5.857	1181	792	1.491	Twice-to-beat in the semifinals
2	NUNS Bullpups	14	12	2	35	38	8	4.750	1101	783	1.406	Twice-to-beat in the semifinals
3	UE Junior Red Warriors	14	11	3	32	34	16	2.125	1167	957	1.219	Twice-to-win in the semifinals
4	Adamson Baby Falcons	14	7 (Note: Fourth seed playoff: Adamson 3–1 FEU-D)	7	21	23	21	1.095	972	892	1.090	Twice-to-win in the semifinals
5	FEU–D Baby Tamaraws	14	7	7	22	28	21	1.333	1104	956	1.155	
6	DLSZ Junior Green Spikers	14	4	10	12	12	30	0.400	749	968	0.774	
7	Ateneo Blue Eagles	14	2	12	6	7	38	0.184	696	1073	0.649	
8	UPIS Junior Fighting Maroons	14	0	14	0	2	42	0.048	551	1100	0.501	

Source: UAAP Volleyball Livestats
Rules for classification: 1) number of wins; 2) if tied for No. 2 or 4, one-game playoff; 3) match points; 4) sets ratio; 5) points ratio; 6) head-to-head record
(H) Host

==== Match-up results ====
	Round 1							Round 2						
Team ╲ Game	1	2	3	4	5	6	7	8	9	10	11	12	13	14
Adamson	UP school colors	Ateneo school colors	NU school colors	UST school colors	UE school colors	FEU school colors	La Salle school colors	NU school colors	UP school colors	UST school colors	FEU school colors	La Salle school colors	Ateneo school colors	UE school colors
Ateneo	La Salle school colors	Adamson school colors	UST school colors	FEU school colors	NU school colors	UE school colors	UP school colors	FEU school colors	UE school colors	La Salle school colors	NU school colors	UST school colors	Adamson school colors	UP school colors
DLSZ	Ateneo school colors	UE school colors	UP school colors	NU school colors	UST school colors	FEU school colors	Adamson school colors	UP school colors	NU school colors	Ateneo school colors	UST school colors	Adamson school colors	UE school colors	FEU school colors
FEU–D	NU school colors	UE school colors	UP school colors	Ateneo school colors	Adamson school colors	La Salle school colors	UST school colors	Ateneo school colors	UST school colors	UP school colors	Adamson school colors	UE school colors	NU school colors	La Salle school colors
NUNS	FEU school colors	Adamson school colors	UST school colors	La Salle school colors	Ateneo school colors	UP school colors	UE school colors	Adamson school colors	La Salle school colors	UE school colors	Ateneo school colors	UP school colors	FEU school colors	UST school colors
UE	UST school colors	La Salle school colors	FEU school colors	UP school colors	Adamson school colors	Ateneo school colors	NU school colors	UST school colors	Ateneo school colors	NU school colors	UP school colors	FEU school colors	La Salle school colors	Adamson school colors
UPIS	Adamson school colors	La Salle school colors	FEU school colors	UE school colors	NU school colors	UST school colors	Ateneo school colors	La Salle school colors	Adamson school colors	FEU school colors	UE school colors	NU school colors	UST school colors	Ateneo school colors
UST	UE school colors	Ateneo school colors	NU school colors	Adamson school colors	La Salle school colors	UP school colors	FEU school colors	UE school colors	FEU school colors	Adamson school colors	La Salle school colors	Ateneo school colors	UP school colors	NU school colors

Source: UAAP Volleyball Livestats
= Win; = Loss

==== Game results ====
Results on top and to the right of the solid cells are for first-round games; those to the bottom and to the left of it are second-round games.

Teams	AdU	ADMU	DLSZ	FEU–D	NUNS	UE	UPIS	UST
Adamson Baby Falcons		3–0	3–0	3–1	0–3	1–3	3–0	0–3
Ateneo Blue Eagles	0–3		0–3	0–3	0–3	0–3	3–1	0–3
DLSZ Junior Green Spikers	0–3	3–0		0–3	0–3	0–3	3–0	0–3
FEU–D Baby Tamaraws	3–0	3–0	3–0		2–3	1–3	3–0	1–3
NUNS Bullpups	3–0	3–0	3–0	3–0		3–0	3–0	1–3
UE Junior Red Warriors	3–1	3–1	3–0	3–1	0–3		3–0	1–3
UPIS Junior Fighting Maroons	0–3	1–3	0–3	0–3	0–3	0–3		0–3
UST Junior Golden Spikers	3–0	3–0	3–0	3–1	3–1	2–3	3–0	

Source: UAAP Volleyball Livestats
Legend: Blue = left column team win; Red = top row team win.

=== Fourth seed playoff ===
FEU-Diliman and Adamson finished the elimination round tied for fourth. This is a one-game playoff to determine the #4 seed.

November 27, 2024; 3:00 PM (UTC+8:00)	FEU–D Baby Tamaraws	1–3	Adamson Baby Falcons	Filoil EcoOil Centre, San Juan; Attendance: 1,000+
November 27, 2024; 3:00 PM (UTC+8:00)	(19–25, 21–25, 25–21, 27–29)			Filoil EcoOil Centre, San Juan; Attendance: 1,000+
November 27, 2024; 3:00 PM (UTC+8:00)	Adamson advances to the Final Four			Filoil EcoOil Centre, San Juan; Attendance: 1,000+

=== Bracket ===
Semifinals (Nos. 1 & 2 have twice-to-beat advantage)
1	UST	3
4	Adamson	0
2	NUNS	3
3	UE	2

Final (Best-of-three series)
1	UST	3	3
2	NUNS	1	0

=== Semifinals ===
UST and NUNS have the twice-to-beat advantage. They only need to win once while their opponents twice in order to qualify in the Finals.

==== UST vs. Adamson ====
November 30, 2024; 11:00 AM	UST Tiger Cubs	3–0	Adamson Baby Falcons	Filoil EcoOil Centre, San Juan; Attendance: 1,000+
November 30, 2024; 11:00 AM	(25–15, 25–19, 25–23)			Filoil EcoOil Centre, San Juan; Attendance: 1,000+
November 30, 2024; 11:00 AM	UST wins series in one game			Filoil EcoOil Centre, San Juan; Attendance: 1,000+

==== NUNS vs. UE ====
November 30, 2024; 9:00 AM	NUNS Bullpups	3–2	UE Junior Red Warriors	Filoil EcoOil Centre, San Juan; Attendance: 1,000+
November 30, 2024; 9:00 AM	(19–25, 27–29, 25–23, 25–22, 20–18)			Filoil EcoOil Centre, San Juan; Attendance: 1,000+
November 30, 2024; 9:00 AM	NUNS wins series in one game			Filoil EcoOil Centre, San Juan; Attendance: 1,000+

=== Finals ===
The finals is a best-of-three series.

December 4, 2024; 11:00 AM	UST Tiger Cubs	3–1	NUNS Bullpups	UST Quadricentennial Pavilion, Sampaloc, Manila; Attendance: 2,000+
December 4, 2024; 11:00 AM	(18–25, 25–21, 28–26, 25–19)			UST Quadricentennial Pavilion, Sampaloc, Manila; Attendance: 2,000+

December 7, 2024; 11:00 AM	UST Tiger Cubs	3–0	NUNS Bullpups	UST Quadricentennial Pavilion, Sampaloc, Manila; Attendance: 2,000+
December 7, 2024; 11:00 AM	(25–17, 25–22, 25–20)			UST Quadricentennial Pavilion, Sampaloc, Manila; Attendance: 2,000+
December 7, 2024; 11:00 AM	UST wins series, 2–0			UST Quadricentennial Pavilion, Sampaloc, Manila; Attendance: 2,000+

- Finals Most Valuable Player: Kalel Legaspi (UST Tiger Cubs)

=== Awards ===
UAAP Season 87 boys' volleyball champions
UST Tiger Cubs
Second title

The awarding ceremony was held after Game 2 of the Finals series at UST's Quadricentennial Pavilion on December 7, 2024.

- Most Valuable Player: Christian Antonio (UE Junior Red Warriors)
- Rookie of the Year: Kenneth Maliwanag (FEU–D Baby Tamaraws)
- 1st Best Outside Spiker: Christian Antonio (UE Junior Red Warriors)
- 2nd Best Outside Spiker: Zedrick Calimlim (FEU–D Baby Tamaraws)
- 1st Best Middle Blocker: Herbert Egger (NUNS Bullpups)
- 2nd Best Middle Blocker: Clarence Gianan (UE Junior Red Warriors)
- Best Opposite Spiker: Kenneth Maliwanag (FEU–D Baby Tamaraws)
- Best Setter: Kale Ronquillo (NUNS Bullpups)
- Best Libero: Jhon Guevarra (Adamson Baby Falcons)

== Girls' tournament ==
=== Team line-up ===
Adamson Lady Baby Falcons
No.	Name	Position
1	TUDDAO, Lhouriz	MB
2	CANTADA, Sam	OH
3	BUHAY, Janessa	OH
4	MARTIN, Kristal	OH
5	DIZON, Janna	MB
7	ARASAN, Jennel	S
8	SEGUI, Abby (c)	OP
9	GONZALVO, Ellaine	OH
10	BALOLOY, Antonia	
11	PINEDA, Maegan	L
13	GAM, Jesselou	L
14	ADAM, Francheska	
23	ORDONIO, Seanne	MB
24	GARCES, Elaine	S
	YUDE, JP	HC

Ateneo Blue Eagles
No.	Name	Position
2	ARDIDON, Rian (c)	OH
4	ATIENZA, Luanne	MB
5	AJON, Niña	S
7	DAMIAN, Gian	OP
8	RAMOS, Althea	MB
10	CASTELLANO, Foni	OH
11	TORRES, Satya	S
14	DAIT, Jelena	L
16	LIM, Annika	OH
18	LADIGNON, Nicola	OP
	CASTILLO, Babes	HC

Zobel Junior Lady Archers
No.	Name	Position
1	DELOS SANTOS, Elina	L
3	ARADO, Azalia	MB
4	TAGALOG, Sam	MB
5	CENIZAL, Angel	L
6	BONAFE, Tessa	OH
7	MINDANAO, Juliene	OP
8	VALDEZ, Sabine	S
9	ALEMAÑA, Aislinn (c)	OH
10	TAÑADA, Marga	OH
13	MARZAN, Sam	OH
14	BELEN, Mary Chloe	S
15	LIMPOT, Zofi	S
17	CELADA, Kylie	OH
18	LEGASPI, Chelsea	OP
	MONREAL, Jeremiah	HC

FEU–D Lady Baby Tamaraws
No.	Name	Position
1	DEVOSORA, Aleah	OH
2	ALONZO, Raine (c)	OP
3	BOSTON, Bernadine	MB
4	ROBERTS, Saleisha	OH
5	OSO, Aiumi	OH
7	CAFE, Sheena	S
8	PREMAYLON, Franz	OP
9	PASCUAL, Sheila	OH
11	UMAL, Cathlyn	MB
13	MOLINO, Ashera	OH
15	GARAVILLAS, Althea	MB
18	RELOX, Dennz	L
20	ONA, Aliah	MB
24	REQUIRME, Mary Rose	L
	BUNAG, Joanne	HC

NUNS Lady Bullpups
No.	Name	Position
1	DAYLISAN, Den	OH
3	BERAYO, Bambam	OH
4	COJA, Samantha	L
5	NAVARRO, Rihanna	S
6	JACOB, Jenelyn	MB
7	ALBERTO, Hilalhia	MB
8	SERNECHE, Lot (c)	OP
9	BARTOLABAC, Akeyla	OH
11	DELA PEÑA, Lyzel	MB
12	CRUZ, Ysabelle	OP
15	PEÑOL, Cheska	S
16	TAYAG, Mardy	OH
17	DOROJA, Atasha	L
18	LUMBANG, Sarah Joy	OH
	DIMACULANGAN, Ray Karl	HC

UP Junior Fighting Maroons
No.	Name	Position
1	LAGRADILLA, Nica	S
3	PEREZ, Liyzha	
7	PAGULAYAN, Andrea	
10	GUARINO, Janella (c)	OP
11	LEGUIAB, Trizia	L
12	LEAÑO, Mira	OH
13	CANONIZADO, Rizza	OH
14	HERNANDEZ, Keira	L
15	CALLO, Anya	MB
16	LONG, Khloe	S
17	CUERVO, Natalie	MB
18	CAPUS, Elisha	OH
20	ABAD, Nina	OH
21	DAVID, Kaitlyn	
	HUBALDE, Jarod	HC

UST Junior Tigresses
No.	Name	Position
2	SILVESTRE, Jezrel	S
3	ADRAO, Jai (c)	MB
4	PEPITO, Chasliey	L
5	BRON, Avril	MB
7	AUXTERO, Jheliane	OP
10	PENULIAR, Iya	MB
11	SANTOS, Aneeza	S
12	OLAGUIR, Rochelle	MB
13	SILVESTRE, Jezel	OH
14	PANISALES, Marianne	L
15	RUBIN, Kim	OH
18	JARAMILLO, Antonette	OH
19	LAAG, Ryzel	OH
24	ABAYON, Reeza	OP
	REYES, Kungfu	HC

Legend
S	Setter
MB	Middle Blocker
OH	Outside Hitter
OP	Opposite Hitter
L	Libero
(c)	Team Captain
HC	Head coach

=== Elimination round ===
==== Team standings ====
Pos	Team	Pld	W	L	Pts	SW	SL	SR	SPW	SPL	SPR	Qualification
1	NUNS Lady Bullpups	12	11	1	31	34	9	3.778	1000	711	1.406	Twice-to-beat in the semifinals
2	Adamson Lady Baby Falcons	12	9	3	28	32	12	2.667	1013	795	1.274	Twice-to-beat in the semifinals
3	UST Junior Tigresses (H)	12	8	4	26	31	16	1.938	1039	862	1.205	Twice-to-win in the semifinals
4	FEU–D Lady Baby Tamaraws	12	8	4	23	25	15	1.667	937	801	1.170	Twice-to-win in the semifinals
5	DLSZ Junior Lady Spikers	12	4	8	12	13	24	0.542	711	824	0.863	
6	UPIS Junior Lady Maroons	12	2	10	6	6	30	0.200	574	841	0.683	
7	Ateneo Blue Eagles	12	0	12	0	0	36	0.000	461	901	0.512	

Source: UAAP Volleyball Livestats
Rules for classification: 1) number of wins; 2) if tied for No. 2 or 4, one-game playoff; 3) match points; 4) sets ratio; 5) points ratio; 6) head-to-head record
(H) Host

==== Match-up results ====
	Round 1						Round 2					
Team ╲ Game	1	2	3	4	5	6	7	8	9	10	11	12
Adamson	UST school colors	La Salle school colors	UP school colors	NU school colors	FEU school colors	Ateneo school colors	UP school colors	NU school colors	La Salle school colors	Ateneo school colors	FEU school colors	UST school colors
Ateneo	UST school colors	La Salle school colors	UP school colors	NU school colors	FEU school colors	Adamson school colors	FEU school colors	UST school colors	UP school colors	NU school colors	Adamson school colors	La Salle school colors
DLSZ	FEU school colors	Ateneo school colors	Adamson school colors	UST school colors	UP school colors	NU school colors	UST school colors	UP school colors	NU school colors	Adamson school colors	Ateneo school colors	FEU school colors
FEU–D	La Salle school colors	UP school colors	NU school colors	Ateneo school colors	Adamson school colors	UST school colors	Ateneo school colors	UST school colors	UP school colors	NU school colors	Adamson school colors	La Salle school colors
NUNS	UP school colors	FEU school colors	Ateneo school colors	Adamson school colors	UST school colors	La Salle school colors	Adamson school colors	La Salle school colors	Ateneo school colors	FEU school colors	UST school colors	UP school colors
UPIS	NU school colors	FEU school colors	Ateneo school colors	Adamson school colors	UST school colors	La Salle school colors	Adamson school colors	La Salle school colors	Ateneo school colors	FEU school colors	UST school colors	NU school colors
UST	Ateneo school colors	Adamson school colors	La Salle school colors	UP school colors	NU school colors	FEU school colors	La Salle school colors	Ateneo school colors	FEU school colors	UP school colors	NU school colors	Adamson school colors

Source: UAAP Volleyball Livestats
= Win; = Loss

==== Game results ====
Results on top and to the right of the solid cells are for first-round games; those to the bottom and to the left of it are second-round games.

Teams	AdU	ADMU	DLSZ	FEU–D	NUNS	UPIS	UST
Adamson Lady Baby Falcons		3–0	3–0	3–0	2–3	3–0	2–3
Ateneo Blue Eagles	0–3		0–3	0–3	0–3	0–3	0–3
DLSZ Junior Lady Spikers	0–3	3–0		0–3	0–3	3–0	0–3
FEU–D Lady Baby Tamaraws	1–3	3–0	3–0		3–1	3–0	3–2
NUNS Lady Bullpups	3–1	3–0	3–0	3–0		3–0	3–1
UPIS Junior Fighting Maroons	0–3	3–0	0–3	0–3	0–3		0–3
UST Junior Tigresses	2–3	3–0	3–1	3–1	2–3	3–0	

Source: UAAP Volleyball Livestats
Legend: Blue = left column team win; Red = top row team win.

=== Bracket ===
Semifinals (Nos. 1 & 2 have twice-to-beat advantage)
1	NUNS	3
4	FEU–D	2
2	Adamson	3
3	UST	2

Final (Best-of-three series)
1	NUNS	3	3
2	Adamson	0	0

=== Semifinals ===
NUNS and Adamson have the twice-to-beat advantage. They only need to win once while their opponents twice in order to qualify in the Finals.

==== NUNS vs. FEU-D ====
November 30, 2024; 1:00 PM	NUNS Lady Bullpups	3–2	FEU–D Lady Baby Tamaraws	Filoil EcoOil Centre, San Juan; Attendance: 1,500+
November 30, 2024; 1:00 PM	(25–18, 21–25, 21–25, 25–16, 18–16)			Filoil EcoOil Centre, San Juan; Attendance: 1,500+
November 30, 2024; 1:00 PM	NUNS wins series in one game			Filoil EcoOil Centre, San Juan; Attendance: 1,500+

==== Adamson vs. UST ====
November 30, 2024; 3:00 PM	Adamson Lady Baby Falcons	3–2	UST Junior Tigresses	Filoil EcoOil Centre, San Juan; Attendance: 1,500+
November 30, 2024; 3:00 PM	(20–25, 18–25, 25–23, 25–18, 15–9)			Filoil EcoOil Centre, San Juan; Attendance: 1,500+
November 30, 2024; 3:00 PM	Adamson wins series in one game			Filoil EcoOil Centre, San Juan; Attendance: 1,500+

=== Finals ===
The finals is a best-of-three series.

December 4, 2024; 9:00 AM	NUNS Lady Bullpups	3–0	Adamson Lady Baby Falcons	UST Quadricentennial Pavilion, Sampaloc, Manila; Attendance: 2,000+
December 4, 2024; 9:00 AM	(25–16, 25–21, 25–13)			UST Quadricentennial Pavilion, Sampaloc, Manila; Attendance: 2,000+

December 7, 2024; 9:00 AM	NUNS Lady Bullpups	3–0	Adamson Lady Baby Falcons	UST Quadricentennial Pavilion, Sampaloc, Manila; Attendance: 2,000+
December 7, 2024; 9:00 AM	(25–17, 25–22, 25–20)			UST Quadricentennial Pavilion, Sampaloc, Manila; Attendance: 2,000+
December 7, 2024; 9:00 AM	NUNS wins series, 2–0			UST Quadricentennial Pavilion, Sampaloc, Manila; Attendance: 2,000+

- Finals Most Valuable Player: Lot Serneche (NUNS Lady Bullpups)

=== Awards ===
UAAP Season 87 girls' volleyball champions
NUNS Lady Bullpups
Seventh title

The awarding ceremony was held after Game 2 of the Finals series at UST's Quadricentennial Pavilion on December 7, 2024.

- Most Valuable Player: Sam Cantada (Adamson Lady Baby Falcons)
- Rookie of the Year: Ellaine Gonzalvo (Adamson Lady Baby Falcons)
- 1st Best Outside Spiker: Sam Cantada (Adamson Lady Baby Falcons)
- 2nd Best Outside Spiker: Den Daylisan (NUNS Lady Bullpups)
- 1st Best Middle Blocker: Avril Bron (UST Junior Tigresses)
- 2nd Best Middle Blocker: Iya Penuliar (UST Junior Tigresses)
- Best Opposite Spiker: Aleah Devosora (FEU–D Lady Baby Tamaraws)
- Best Setter: Sheena Cafe (FEU–D Lady Baby Tamaraws)
- Best Libero: Angel Cenizal (Zobel Junior Lady Archers)

== Overall championship points ==
=== Seniors' division ===
Team	Men	Women	Total
Adamson Soaring Falcons	2	6	8
Ateneo Blue Eagles	6	2	8
De La Salle Green Archers	8	12	20
FEU Tamaraws	12	8	20
NU Bulldogs	15	15	30
UE Red Warriors	1	1	2
UP Fighting Maroons	4	4	8
UST Growling Tigers	10	10	20

=== Juniors' division ===
Team	Boys'	Girls'	Points
Adamson Baby Falcons	8	12	20
Ateneo Blue Eagles	2	2	4
Zobel Junior Archers	4	6	10
FEU–D Baby Tamaraws	6	8	14
NUNS Bullpups	12	15	27
UE Junior Red Warriors	10	–	10
UPIS Junior Fighting Maroons	1	4	5
UST Tiger Cubs	15	10	25

Pts.	Ranking
15	Champion
12	2nd
10	3rd
8	4th
6	5th
4	6th
2	7th
1	8th
—	Did not join

In case of a tie, the team with the higher position in any tournament is ranked higher. If both are still tied, they are listed by alphabetical order.

How rankings are determined:

- Ranks 5th to 8th determined by elimination round rankings.
- Semifinals losers ranked by elimination round rankings
- Loser of the finals is ranked 2nd
- Champion is ranked 1st

== See also ==
- NCAA Season 100 volleyball tournaments

Preceded by Season 86 (2023–24)	UAAP volleyball tournaments Season 87 (2024–25)	Succeeded by Season 88 (2025–26)
