= Philippines women's national under-23 volleyball team =

Philippines Under-23
- Association: LVPI
- Confederation: AVC
- Head coach: Emilio Reyes Jr.

Uniforms
Home	Away	Third

FIVB U23 World Championship
- Appearances: none

Asian Women's U23 Championship
- Appearances: 1 (First in 2015)
- Best result: 7th (2015)

The Philippines women's national under-23 volleyball team was the national volleyball team of the Philippines that represented the country in under-23 volleyball events. They were ranked 28 as of January 2017. Its highest achievement was in 2015 where it placed 7th. It was governed by Larong Volleyball sa Pilipinas (LVPI) from 2015 until 2019.

== History ==
The Philippines was the host country of the first ever Asian Women's U23 Volleyball Championship held in Pasig in 2015. The tournament served as the Asian qualifiers for the 2015 FIVB Volleyball Women's U23 World Championship held in Ankara, Turkey which the top two ranked teams qualified for the world championship.

The tournament was organized by the Asian Volleyball Confederation, in association with Larong Volleyball sa Pilipinas, Inc. (LVPI), the newly formed national federation for volleyball in the Philippines. The first U-23 team of the Philippines was headed by Alyssa Valdez of Ateneo De Manila University. The team ended in 7th place out of 12 nations.

In May 2019, the FIVB announced that as per the decision of the FIVB Board of Administration, the U23 World Championships had been abolished. Hence, the abolishment of all U23 teams worldwide, while retaining the remaining U18-19 and U20-21 youth teams."

== Rankings ==
This is the last archived ranking of the under-23 volleyball team of the Philippines in FIVB World Rankings.

Philippines Women's national under-23 volleyball team rank as of January 2019
Rank	Team	Points	Confederation
29 ▼	Philippines	5	AVC
29 ▼	Iran	5	AVC
31 ▼	Kazakhstan	3	AVC

== Final squad ==
This is the Philippines' official line up for the 2019 Women's Volleyball Kor Royal Cup held in Thailand.

Philippines Under 23 - Official Line Up for 2019 Thailand Sealect Tuna Volleyball Championship
No.	Name	Position	Height	Weight	Date of birth	School
1	Jewel Hannah Encarnacion	Outside hitter	1.70 m (5 ft 7 in)	52 kg (115 lb)	December 22, 2000 (age 25)	De La Salle Zobel
3	Ysabel Jamie Jimenez	Opposite hitter	1.75 m (5 ft 9 in)	59 kg (130 lb)	November 8, 1999 (age 26)	University of Santo Tomas
5	Imee Kim Gabriella Hernandez	Middle blocker	1.80 m (5 ft 11 in)	63 kg (139 lb)	November 6, 2000 (age 25)	University of Santo Tomas
6	Ivanna Marie Agudo	Opposite hitter	1.70 m (5 ft 7 in)	57 kg (126 lb)	February 23, 1998 (age 28)	Far Eastern University
7	Ma. Regina Agatha Mangulabnan	Setter	1.65 m (5 ft 5 in)	50 kg (110 lb)	March 24, 1999 (age 27)	University of Santo Tomas
8	Ylizyeth Justine Jazareno	Libero	1.65 m (5 ft 5 in)	52 kg (115 lb)	March 25, 2000 (age 26)	De La Salle Zobel
9	Roselyn Rosier	Outside hitter	1.70 m (5 ft 7 in)	63 kg (139 lb)	September 10, 1998 (age 28)	University of the Philippines Diliman
10	Kecelyn Galdones	Middle blocker	1.78 m (5 ft 10 in)	70 kg (150 lb)	June 29, 1999 (age 27)	University of Santo Tomas
11	Maria Fe Galanza	Setter	1.63 m (5 ft 4 in)	53 kg (117 lb)	May 11, 2000 (age 26)	University of Santo Tomas
12	Angel Anne Canino	Outside hitter	1.80 m (5 ft 11 in)	57 kg (126 lb)	June 23, 2003 (age 23)	De La Salle Zobel
13	Celine Elaiza Domingo (c)	Middle blocker	1.78 m (5 ft 10 in)	60 kg (130 lb)	April 20, 1999 (age 27)	Far Eastern University
15	Rachelle Roldan	Libero	1.73 m (5 ft 8 in)	60 kg (130 lb)	June 15, 1999 (age 27)	University of Santo Tomas
16	Lyann Marie Loise De Guzman	Outside hitter	1.78 m (5 ft 10 in)	67 kg (148 lb)	February 14, 2002 (age 24)	Far Eastern University
18	Janna Elizabeth Torres	Middle blocker	1.78 m (5 ft 10 in)	64 kg (141 lb)	September 14, 2000 (age 26)	University of Santo Tomas

Coaching staff

- Head coach:
  (Philippines) Emilio Reyes Jr.
- Assistant coach(s):
  (Philippines) Tina Salak

Team staff

- Team Manager:

(Philippines) Marissa Andres

- Team Utility:

Medical staff

- Team Physician:
- Physical Therapist/Trainer:

(Philippines) Clarence Esteban

== Pool of players ==
Philippines Under 23 - Pool of Players
Pos.	Name	Date of birth	Height	School	Current/Last Club
OH	Judith Abil	December 4, 1997 (age 28)	1.68 m (5 ft 6 in)	University of the East	(Philippines) Marinerang Pilipina Lady Skippers
OPP	Ivanna Marie Agudo	February 23, 1998 (age 28)	1.70 m (5 ft 7 in)	Far Eastern University	(Philippines) Petron Blaze Spikers
OH/L	Justine Dorog	March 13, 1998 (age 28)	1.63 m (5 ft 4 in)	University of the Philippines Diliman	(Philippines) Chery Tiggo Crossovers
L	Ria Beatriz Glenell Duremdes	June 7, 1998 (age 28)	1.57 m (5 ft 2 in)	Far Eastern University	(Philippines) Chery Tiggo Crossovers
OH	Roselyn Rosier	September 10, 1998 (age 28)	1.73 m (5 ft 8 in)	University of the Philippines Diliman	
OH	Maria Lina Isabel Molde (c)	October 18, 1998 (age 28)	1.72 m (5 ft 7 1/2 in)	University of the Philippines Diliman	(Philippines) Choco Mucho Flying Titans
MB	Maristella Gene Layug	November 13, 1998 (age 27)	1.80 m (5 ft 11 in)	University of the Philippines Diliman	(Philippines) Motolite
OH	Mary Anne Mendrez	November 14, 1998 (age 27)	1.75 m (5 ft 9 in)	University of the East	(Philippines) Generika-Ayala Lifesavers
S	Alina Joyce Bicar	November 17, 1998 (age 27)	1.65 m (5 ft 5 in)	University of Santo Tomas	(Philippines) BaliPure Purest Water Defenders
MB	Kecelyn Galdones	July 29, 1999 (age 27)	1.72 m (5 ft 7 1/2 in)	University of Santo Tomas	
OPP	Ysabel Jamie Jimenez	November 8, 1999 (age 26)	1.75 m (5 ft 9 in)	University of Santo Tomas	
S	Maria Fe Galanza	May 11, 2000 (age 26)	1.65 m (5 ft 5 in)	University of Santo Tomas	
MB	Imee Kim Gabriela Hernandez	November 6, 2000 (age 25)	1.80 m (5 ft 11 in)	University of Santo Tomas	
MB	Jeanette Villareal	October 25, 1998 (age 28)	1.73 m (5 ft 8 in)	Far Eastern University	(Philippines) Cocolife Asset Managers
OPP	Lycha Ebon	October 23, 1999 (age 27)	1.70 m (5 ft 7 in)	Far Eastern University	
OH	Faith Janine Shirley Nisperos	January 2, 2000 (age 26)	1.80 m (5 ft 11 in)	Ateneo De Manila University	(Philippines) BaliPure Purest Water Defenders
MB	Alexis Ciarra Miner	January 31, 2001 (age 25)		Far Eastern University - Diliman	
OH	Alleiah Jan Malaluan	May 4, 2004 (age 22)	1.78 m (5 ft 10 in)	De La Salle Santiago Zobel School	
L	Ylizyeth Justine Jazareno	March 25, 2000 (age 26)	1.62 m (5 ft 4 in)	De La Salle University	
OH	Angel Anne Canino	June 23, 2003 (age 23)	1.80 m (5 ft 11 in)	De La Salle Santiago Zobel School	
OH	Lyann Marie Loise De Guzman	February 24, 2002 (age 24)		Far Eastern University - Diliman	

MH Middle Hitter OP Opposite Hitter OH Outside Hitter MB Middle Blocker S Setter L Libero R Reserve

Coaching staff

- Head coach:
  (Philippines) Emilio Reyes Jr.
- Assistant coach(s):
  (Philippines) Tina Salak
  (Philippines) Michael Fritz Santos

Team staff

- Team Manager:
- Team Utility:

Medical staff

- Team Physician:
- Physical Therapist/Trainer:

(Philippines) Clarence Esteban

== Previous squads ==
2019 squad

=== 2019 Women's Volleyball Kor Royal Cup ===
Philippines (2019 Women's Volleyball Kor Royal Cup)

Philippines Under 23 – Official Line Up for 2019 Thailand Sealect Tuna Volleyball Championship
No.	Name	Position	Height	Weight	Date of birth
1	Jewel Hannah Encarnacion	Outside hitter	1.70 m (5 ft 7 in)	52 kg (115 lb)	December 22, 2000 (aged 18)
3	Ysabel Jamie Jimenez	Opposite hitter	1.75 m (5 ft 9 in)	59 kg (130 lb)	November 8, 1999 (aged 19)
5	Imee Kim Gabriella Hernandez	Middle blocker	1.80 m (5 ft 11 in)	63 kg (139 lb)	November 6, 2000 (aged 18)
6	Ivanna Marie Agudo	Opposite hitter	1.70 m (5 ft 7 in)	57 kg (126 lb)	February 23, 1998 (aged 21)
7	Ma. Regina Agatha Mangulabnan	Setter	1.65 m (5 ft 5 in)	50 kg (110 lb)	March 24, 1999 (aged 20)
8	Ylizyeth Justine Jazareno	Libero	1.65 m (5 ft 5 in)	52 kg (115 lb)	March 25, 2000 (aged 19)
9	Roselyn Rosier	Outside hitter	1.70 m (5 ft 7 in)	63 kg (139 lb)	September 10, 1998 (aged 20)
10	Kecelyn Galdones	Middle blocker	1.78 m (5 ft 10 in)	70 kg (150 lb)	June 29, 1999 (aged 20)
11	Mafe Galanza	Setter	1.63 m (5 ft 4 in)	53 kg (117 lb)	May 11, 2000 (aged 19)
12	Angel Canino	Outside hitter	1.80 m (5 ft 11 in)	57 kg (126 lb)	June 23, 2003 (aged 16)
13	Celine Domingo (c)	Middle blocker	1.78 m (5 ft 10 in)	60 kg (130 lb)	April 20, 1999 (aged 20)
15	Rachelle Roldan	Libero	1.73 m (5 ft 8 in)	60 kg (130 lb)	June 15, 1999 (aged 20)
16	Lyann Marie Loise De Guzman	Outside hitter	1.78 m (5 ft 10 in)	67 kg (148 lb)	February 14, 2002 (aged 17)
18	Janna Elizabeth Torres	Middle blocker	1.78 m (5 ft 10 in)	64 kg (141 lb)	September 14, 2000 (aged 18)

Coaching staff

- Head coach:
  (Philippines) Emilio Reyes Jr.
- Assistant coach(s):
  (Philippines) Tina Salak

Team staff

- Team Manager:

(Philippines) Marissa Andres

- Team Utility:

Medical staff

- Team Physician:
- Physical Therapist/Trainer:

(Philippines) Clarence Esteban

2015 squad

=== 2015 Asian Women's U23 Volleyball Championship ===
Philippines (2015 Asian U23 Women’s Volleyball Championship)

No.	Player	Ht.	College	Club	Position
1	Christine Agno	1.57 m (5 ft 2 in)	FEU	Philippine Army Lady Troopers	Libero
2	Alyssa Valdez (c)	1.75 m (5 ft 9 in)	ADMU	PLDT Home Ultera Ultra Fast Hitters (women)	Outside Hitter
3	Alyja Daphne Santiago	1.96 m (6 ft 5 in)	NU	PLDT Home Ultera Ultra Fast Hitters (women)	Middle Blocker
5	Grethcel Soltones	1.70 m (5 ft 7 in)	SSC-R	PLDT Home Ultera Ultra Fast Hitters (women)	Outside Hitter
6	Risa Sato	1.80 m (5 ft 11 in)	ADMU	–	Middle Blocker
8	Jorella Marie de Jesus	1.52 m (5 ft 0 in)	ADMU	–	Defensive Specialist/Outside Hitter
9	Ennajie Laure	1.75 m (5 ft 9 in)	UST	–	Outside Hitter
12	Julia Melissa Morado	1.70 m (5 ft 7 in)	ADMU	–	Setter
14	Isabel Beatriz de Leon	1.83 m (6 ft 0 in)	ADMU	–	Middle Blocker
15	Jhoana Louisse Maraguinot	1.73 m (5 ft 8 in)	ADMU	–	Opposite Hitter
17	Myla Pablo	1.75 m (5 ft 9 in)	NU	Philips Gold Lady Slammers	Opposite Hitter
18	Marivic Meneses	1.85 m (6 ft 1 in)	UST	Cagayan Valley Lady Rising Suns	Middle Blocker

Coaching staff

- Head coach:
  (Philippines) Roger Gorayeb
- Assistant coach(s):
  (Thailand) Anusorn Bundit
  (Philippines) Edjet Mabbayad
  (Philippines) Parley Tupaz

Team Staff

- Team Manager:
  Ramon Cojuangco Jr.
- Team Utility:

Medical Staff

- Team Physician:
- Physical Therapist:
  Raymond Pili

== Results and fixtures ==
Date	Competition	Location	Opponent	Result
2015
1 May 2015	2015 Asian Women's U23 Volleyball Championship	Pasig, Philippines	Iran	1–3 L
2 May 2015	2015 Asian Women's U23 Volleyball Championship	Pasig, Philippines	Kazakhstan	3–0 W
4 May 2015	2015 Asian Women's U23 Volleyball Championship	Pasig, Philippines	Japan	0–3 L
5 May 2015	2015 Asian Women's U23 Volleyball Championship	Pasig, Philippines	Chinese Taipei	1–3 L
7 May 2015	2015 Asian Women's U23 Volleyball Championship	Pasig, Philippines	China	1–3 L
8 May 2015	2015 Asian Women's U23 Volleyball Championship	Pasig, Philippines	Chinese Taipei	0–3 L
9 May 2015	2015 Asian Women's U23 Volleyball Championship	Pasig, Philippines	Iran	3–0 W
2019
5 July 2019	2019 Women's Volleyball Kor Royal Cup	Sisaket, Thailand	(Japan) Okayama Seagulls	0–3 L
6 July 2019	2019 Women's Volleyball Kor Royal Cup	Sisaket, Thailand	(Thailand) 3BB Nakornnont	0–3 L

== Competition record ==
=== Asian Women's U23 Volleyball Championship ===
Asian U23 Championship record
Year	Round	Position	Pld	W	L	SW	SL	Squad
(Philippines) 2015	Classification Round	7th place	7	2	5	9	15	Squad
(Thailand) 2017	Did not Participate							
(Vietnam) 2019	Did not Participate							
Total	0 Title(s)		7	2	5	9	15	—

== See also ==
- Women's
  - Philippines women's national volleyball team
  - Philippines women's national under-21 volleyball team
  - Philippines women's national under-19 volleyball team
  - Philippines women's national under-17 volleyball team
  - Philippines women's national beach volleyball team
- Men's
  - Philippines men's national volleyball team
  - Philippines men's national under-23 volleyball team
  - Philippines men's national under-19 volleyball team
  - Philippines men's national beach volleyball team
- Volleyball in the Philippines
