= Roselyn Rosier =

Filipino volleyball player

Personal information
- Full name: Roselyn Rosier
- Nickname: Rosie
- Born: September 10, 1998 (age 28)
- Hometown: San Pedro, Laguna, Philippines
- Height: 5 ft 7 in (1.70 m)
- Weight: 79 kg (174 lb)
- Spike: 351 cm (138 in)
- Block: 328 cm (129 in)
- Education: University of the Philippines Diliman

Volleyball information
- Position: Wing Spiker
- Number: 19

National team
| 2014 | Philippines (U17) |
| 2019 | Philippines (U23) |

Roselyn Rosier (born September 10, 1998) is a Filipina volleyball player. In college, she played for the UP Lady Fighting Maroons of the University Athletic Association of the Philippines (UAAP).

== Career ==
Rosier was a member of the U17 Philippines national women's volleyball team in 2014, that finished 7th among 13 teams in the 2014 Asian Youth Girls Volleyball Championship. It defeated Australia and India while losing to China in straight sets in the Group C stage. In the qualifying round, it lost to Thailand while winning against New Zealand in 4 sets. In the quarterfinals, it lost to South Korea. In the 5th–8th place playoffs, it lost to Kazakhstan in 5 sets. In the 7th place game, it won against New Zealand again. She joined the UP Lady Maroons for the UAAP Season 80 volleyball tournaments where they finished at 6th place. She is part of the UPWVT who won the championship in the 2018 Premier Volleyball League Collegiate Conference. She was also part of the line up who brought UP on their bronze medal in the UAAP Season 81 Beach Volleyball.

In 2019, Rosier was included in the pool of players for Philippines women's national under-23 volleyball team. Rosier bested other players in garnering a spot in the roster for the 2019 Women's Volleyball Kor Royal Cup held in Thailand. She played sparingly on defense and passing as she was nursing an ankle injury two weeks prior to the competition.

== Personal life ==
Rosier gave birth to a daughter in 2021.

== Awards ==
=== Collegiate ===
- 2017 Founders' Cup Philippines - Champion, with UP Fighting Lady Maroons
- 2018 Premier Volleyball League Collegiate Conference - Champion, with UP Fighting Lady Maroons
- UAAP Season 81 Beach Volleyball - Bronze medal, with UP Fighting Lady Maroons
