= De La Salle Zobel Chorale =

Philippine musical group

De La Salle Santiago Zobel Chorale
- Choir
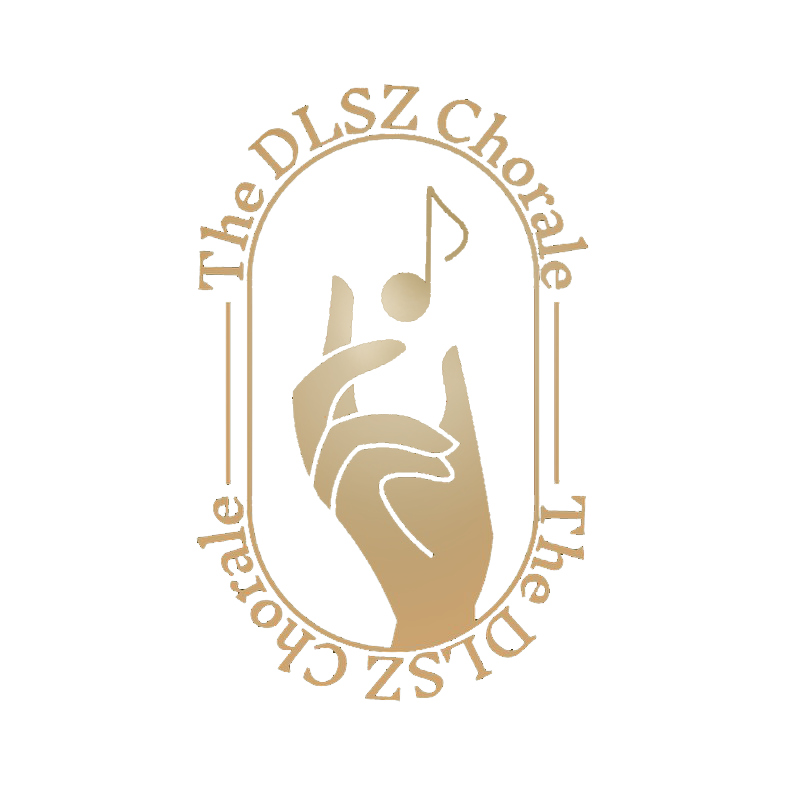
- Also known as: DLSZ Chorale
- Origin: Muntinlupa City, Philippines
- Genre: Choral music
- Choirmaster: Kenneth Fabian
- Headquarters: De La Salle Santiago Zobel School

The De La Salle Zobel Chorale (DLSZ Chorale) is a musical group from De La Salle-Santiago Zobel School in Muntinlupa, Philippines.

Founded in 1995 by Maritess Panaligan, the DLSZ Chorale features different voice range groups such as Soprano, Alto, Tenor, and Bass.

The Chorale's core group consists of members that are specially selected from the SSA (Soprano 1-Soprano 2-Alto) sections, and some members of the Tenors and Basses. They perform in school and community-based activities and actively compete in Choral Competitions both locally and abroad.

== Composition ==
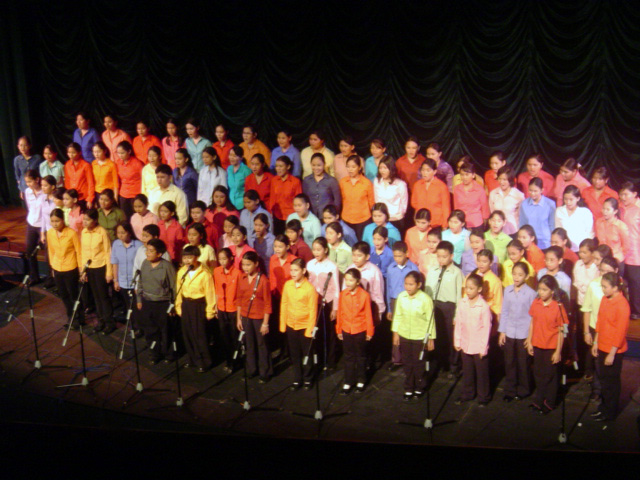
The DLSZ Chorale in concert

The DLSZ Chorale is composed of talented student singers from Grades 5 to 12 of the Alabang and Vermosa campuses, who have passed the auditions and are members of either the Club (The school's academic activity program) or joined the school's Special Music program. These students are given the opportunity to develop their singing talents through individual and group choral activities.

Musical concepts, such as melody, rhythm, form, tempo, and dynamics are integrated into the group's repertoire, which includes songs ranging from the sacred to the contemporary and pop. The repertoire features songs usually in Latin, English, and Filipino.

The group performs annually during the Angelo King Center's Performing Arts Festival that are held on February. The current principal conductor is Michael Kenneth Fabian since 2023.

== International choral achievements ==
The De La Salle Santiago Zobel (DLSZ) Chorale has received recognition in several international choral competitions.

In September 2024, the chorale won two gold medals at the 1st Thailand International Choral Competition Festival in Bangkok, Thailand. Competing in the Children's Choir and Folklore categories, the group also qualified as one of the festival's Grand Prix finalists. The event marked the chorale's first participation in an international choral competition.

In July 2025, the chorale won two Gold Prizes at the 7th Tokyo International Choir Competition in Japan. It received a Gold Prize in the Children's Choir Under-18 category and another Gold Prize in the Folklore category. The group also placed third overall in the Folklore category and received the Audience Favorite Award.

DLSZ Chorale at the 7th Tokyo International Choir Competition performing at the Chldren's Choir Under 18 category

In August 2026, the chorale won two gold awards at the 24th Malaysian Choral Eisteddfod International Choral Festival in Kuala Lumpur, Malaysia. The ensemble received gold awards in the Children's Choir category and the Folklore and Indigenous Music category. According to ABS-CBN News, the achievement marked the chorale's third consecutive gold-winning campaign in an international competition, following its victories in Thailand and Japan.

DLSZ Chorale at the 24th Malaysian Choral Eisteddfod International Choral Festival

== See also ==
- Culture of the Philippines
- De La Salle Zobel Symphony Orchestra
