= De La Salle Zobel Symphony Orchestra =

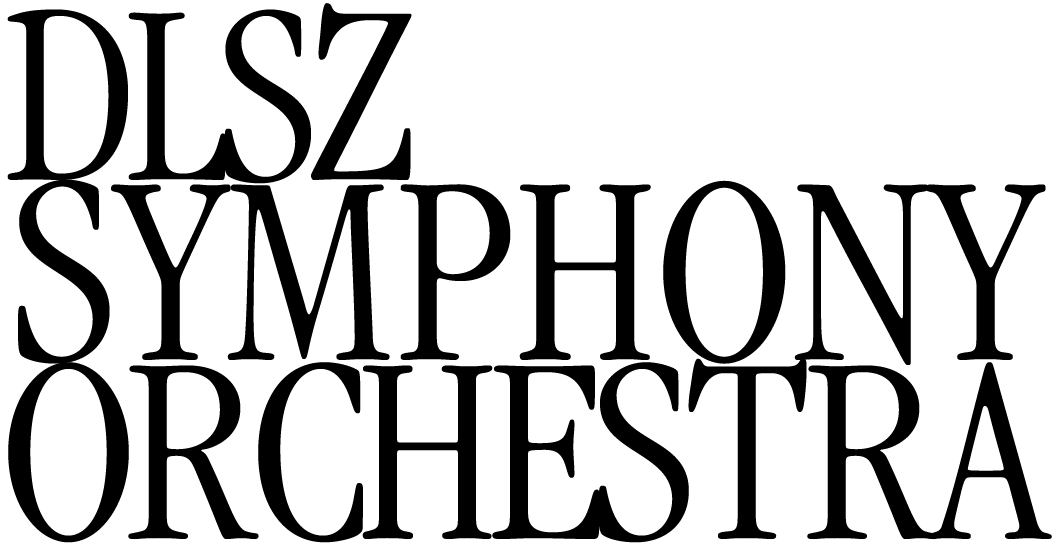
Logotype of the DLSZ Symphony Orchestra

The De La Salle Zobel Symphony Orchestra (DLSZ Symphony) is an 80-member orchestra that is based in De La Salle-Santiago Zobel School in Muntinlupa, Philippines. Its current conductor and orchestral arranger is Leopoldo F. Sumera Jr.

== History ==
It was the first week of September in 1982 when Mr. Edgardo Cadlum and Bro. Raymond Bronowiczs, former Principal and Director respectively, hired Mr. Leo Molino to organized a Band program at De La Salle Zobel for the purpose of providing instrumental music in school gatherings and special events.

With 30 musically inclined students, Mr. Molino started the DLSZ Band. After three months of rigid training, the group was able to present their premiere performance at the Christmas Concert '82 sponsored by the Music Department of DLSZ. The performance was very successful and exciting.

The number of members who joined the band the following years not only doubled but also tripled. At the end of schoolyear 1984–1985, the band program was well organized and established. The String Program was introduced by Mr. Molino the following year, then the DLSZ String Orchestra was born. For some performances, the String Orchestra and Concert Band combined to form the Symphony Orchestra.

To give more exposure to different kinds of music, advanced players from saxophone, trumpet, trombone, and rhythm sections were selected to comprise another group called Jazz Band. The premiere performance of this group was at the End-of-the-Schoolyear Concert 1986–1987.

Every year the performing groups lose members who are from the Senior graduating class. Nonetheless, the DLSZ Band and String Orchestra maintains its standard of performance. The Beginners Band, Violin Prep. Class and Beginning String Orchestra are the training grounds of the performing groups.

=== Past Conductors ===
- Leoncio Molino
- Aguedo Malabanan
- Ryan Hernandez
- Gerardo Fajardo (2003–2004)
- Tom Nazareno (2003–2005)

=== Assistant Conductors ===
The Bandleader of the DLSZ Symphonic Band is concurrently the Assistant Conductor of the Symphony Orchestra. Past Assistant Conductors include:

- Rodolfo Bangco Jr.
- Emmanuel Lalunio (2002–2003)
- Tom Nazareno (2003, 2004)
- Melvin Rioveros (2005–2007)
- Nena Chavez (2007–2022)
- Linwell Lalic (2010–present)

== Composition ==
The DLSZ Symphony Orchestra is composed of the following sections:

- Woodwinds
- Brasses
- Percussion
- Strings

The Orchestra has also been broken into the winds and strings sections to make up a symphonic band and string ensemble, respectively.

== Membership ==
Membership to the Orchestra is open to all grade school and high school students of the school who have been members of the DLSZ Beginning Band or the DLSZ Beginning Strings. These two groups train grade school students in their preferred musical instrument and prepares them for subsequent membership to the Symphony Orchestra.

== Performances ==
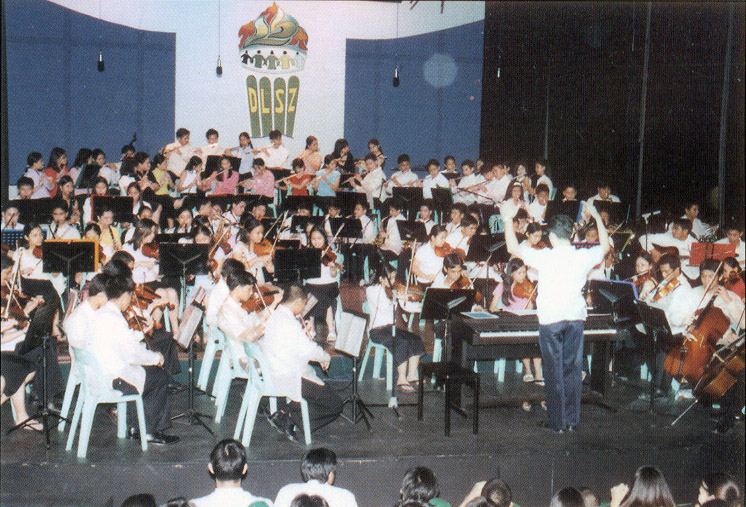
Performing at Zobel's 25th anniversary concert in 2004

The repertoire of the Orchestra mostly consists of classical pieces complemented by contemporary and popular music.

At present, the Orchestra continues to perform its original mandate of providing music for special events that are held on campus. It also plays at concerts during De La Salle Zobel's anniversary celebrations in November and at Christmas. Prior to the establishment of the school's Center for the Performing Arts, the Orchestra held a year-end concert in March. This has since been replaced by the center's annual Performing Arts Festival in February, which also features the other performing groups of the school such as the DLSZ Chorale and the Rondalla Ensemble.

Up until 2000, when the school presented annual musicals at theaters off campus, the Orchestra provided live music to the school plays. The last musical to be performed outside of the campus was Teach the World, a play, which was based on the life and times of St. John Baptist De La Salle. In 2004, during the 25th-anniversary celebrations of De La Salle Zobel, the Orchestra once again provided music to Act 25, which was a revue of the past productions of the school.

Besides performing at Lasallian schools in the Philippines, the DLSZ Symphony has also been invited to perform in other schools around Metro Manila.

Its rehearsal hall is located at the ground floor of De La Salle Zobel's Angelo King Center for the Performing Arts, right beside the Chorale Room.

Last March 2019, the DLSZ Symphony Orchestra garnered a gold award from the Chicago International Music Festival. The group was led by the following music teachers Mr. Leopoldo Sumera Jr. conductor, Ms. Nena Chavez assistant conductor, Mr. Linwell H. Lalic, Ms Ruby Natividad, Mr. Daryl Galicia and Ms. Nadialyn Saraza, music teachers.
