= Heaven Sent =

Heaven Sent may refer to:

== Film and television ==
- Heaven Sent (film) (Un drôle de paroissien), a 1963 French comedy film directed by Jean-Pierre Mocky
- Heaven Sent (1979 film), a Japanese film starring Tsunehiko Watase
- Heaven Sent (1994 film), a film featuring Mary Elizabeth McDonough
- "Heaven Sent" (Doctor Who), an episode of the ninth series of Doctor Who

== Music ==
=== Albums ===
- Heaven Sent (Half Japanese album) or the title song, 1997
- Heaven Sent (John Paul Young album) or the title song, 1979
- Heaven Sent, by Dreamworld, 1996
- Heaven Sent, by Maggie Reilly, 2013
- Heaven Sent, by Rita, 2015
- Heaven Sent, by Scorpion Wind, 1996

=== Songs ===
- "Heaven Sent" (Esthero song), 1998
- "Heaven Sent" (INXS song), 1992
- "Heaven Sent" (Keyshia Cole song), 2008
- "Heaven Sent" (Paul Haig song), 1983
- "Heavensent", by Killing Heidi, 2001
- "Heaven Sent", by Bryan White from How Lucky I Am
- "Heaven Sent", by Dokken from Back for the Attack
- "Heaven Sent", by Hinder from Take It to the Limit

== See also ==
- Heaven Scent, a 1956 cartoon short featuring the character Pepé Le Pew
