= De La Salle Santiago Zobel School =

Catholic private school in Muntinlupa, Philippines

Coordinates: 14°24′37″N 121°1′10″E

Location
- University Avenue, Ayala Alabang; Muntinlupa, Metro Manila; Philippines

Information
- Type: Private, Roman Catholic Lasallian, non-stock, coeducational basic education institution
- Motto: Religio, Mores, Cultura (Latin) Faith, Morals, Culture (Motto in English)
- Religious affiliations: Roman Catholic (Christian Brothers)
- Established: November 1978; 47 years ago
- Founder: De La Salle Brothers
- Oversight: De La Salle Brothers
- President: Br. Bernard Oca, FSC
- Principal: iñigo matto Bautista (Grade School); Br. Bernard Oca, FSC (High School)
- Chaplain: Vacant
- Faculty: 263
- Grades: Grade School; Pre-Kinder, Kinder Gr.1 to 6; Junior High School; Gr.7 to 10; Senior High School; Gr. 11- 12
- Campus: Urban, 7 hectares (70,000 m^{2})
- Colors: Green, gold, white
- Mascot: Junior Archer
- Accreditation: PAASCU
- Affiliations: UAAP, NAMCYA, WNCAA,
- Alma Mater song: De La Salle Alma Mater Hymn
- Varsity Team: De La Salle Zobel Junior Archers
- Website: www.dlszobel.edu.ph
- GS- Prep & Grade School; JHS-Junior High School; SHS-Senior High School

The De La Salle Santiago Zobel School, also referred to by its acronym DLSZ or De La Salle Zobel (Filipino: Paaralang De La Salle Santiago Zobel), is a private Catholic basic education institution for boys and girls run by the Philippine District of the De La Salle Brothers in Muntinlupa, Metro Manila, Philippines. It was opened in 1978 by the De La Salle Brothers because of the increasing number of students in the grade school department of the former De La Salle College (Now, De La Salle University) in Manila.

== Background ==
The first De La Salle School in the Philippines, De La Salle College was opened on June 16, 1911, on Calle Nozaleda in Paco, Manila, at the request of the Archbishop of Manila, Jeremiah James Harty to the Brothers of the Christian Schools. It is interesting to note that Archbishop Harty had a very close affinity to La Salle since he was educated in his elementary and high school years in the U.S. in De La Salle Christian Brother-run schools. In 1921, the school moved to its present site on Taft Avenue and the De La Salle Brothers have since opened schools in Green Hills, Mandaluyong; Antipolo, Rizal; Lipa City, Batangas; two schools (University of St. La Salle and St. Joseph School-La Salle) in Bacolod; Iligan City, Lanao del Norte; two schools (De La Salle University-Dasmariñas and De La Salle Medical and Health Sciences Institute) in Dasmariñas, Cavite, and the De La Salle–Santiago Zobel School in Alabang, Muntinlupa.

== History ==
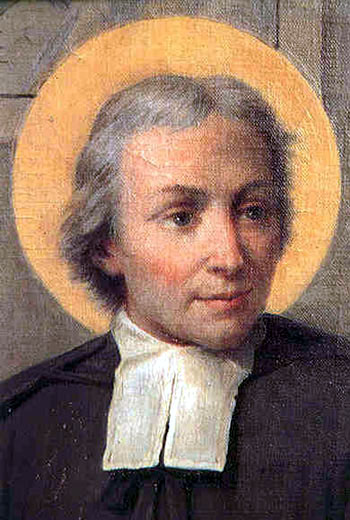
Saint John Baptist de La Salle, the founder of the Christian Brothers

De La Salle–Santiago Zobel School, a member-school of De La Salle Philippines, Inc., was established on March 29, 1978, after it was decided that the elementary department of De La Salle College be moved to a location that is more suitable and conducive to learning. A high school department was also formed to assure the graduates of Zobel's elementary department of placement in secondary education.

The school is located in Muntinlupa's Ayala Alabang Village and was made possible through a joint donation of part of the campus's eleven hectare lot donated by the Ayala Corporation and the Madrigal Family, with the rest of the lot acquired through financing provided by the Filipinas Life Assurance Company. The school's location in Southern Metro Manila also helps in achieving the government's goal of dispersing educational institutions over the Metro, as well as the goal of the Brothers in the Philippines of making their resources available to as many communities as possible.

De La Salle Zobel opened in June 1978 with an initial offering of Prep to Grade Six Levels. The Grade School Department became fully operational when Grade 7 was added in June 1979 and in June 1980, the High School Department opened, initially without Freshman classes. It became fully operational in June 1983. Br. Raymond Bronowicz FSC, then the Vice-President for Administration of De La Salle University, was appointed as Zobel's first director.

== Departments ==
The management of Zobel is divided into seven departments, all reporting directly to the President, Br. Bernard Oca FSC. These are the High School Department, the Grade School Department, the Academic Services Department, the Administrative Services Department, the Lasallian Formation and Mission Department, the Human Resource Management and Development Department, the Finance Department, and the Br. Rafael Donato FSC Night High School (BRafeNHS) Department. The Quality Assurance and Management Office directly under the President is a sub-group composed of the Internal Auditor, the Compliance Officer, the Project Management Officer, and the Strategic Planning Officer. The school's Technological and Vocational School is a sub-group under the BRafeNHS Principal.

== Academics ==
Two main departments make up the academic structure of Zobel, the Grade School and High School Departments. The Grade School curriculum is structured into six learning areas: Mathematics, Science, Language, Reading, Filipino, and MAKABAYAN, the component subjects of which are Christian Living, Social Studies, Computer Science, Music and Art, Physical Education, and Home Economics and Livelihood Education.

The High School curriculum, on the other hand, is composed of ten subject areas, which are: Christian Living, English, Araling Panlipunan, Filipino, Science, Math, Music and Art, Physical Education, and Technology and Home Economics.

The school also encourages its students to participate in academic contests, which serve as enrichment opportunities. Zobel has been a consistent top performer in academic contests such the Metrobank-Mathematics Teachers Association of the Philippines-Department of Education Math Challenge, the Discovery Channel Whiz Quiz Contest, numerous De La Salle University Contests, and the Inter-school Computer Science QuizBits Contest of the Philippine Science High School, among others.

== Performing arts ==
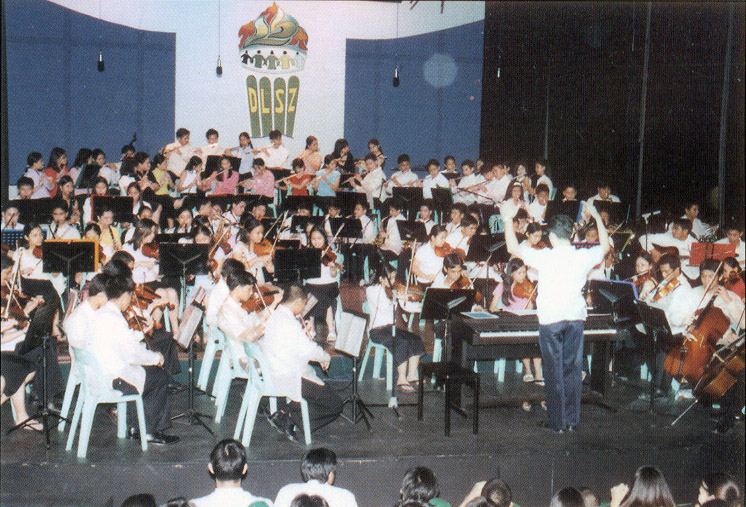
The DLSZ Symphony Orchestra during Zobel's 25th Anniversary concert

With the thrust of supporting the holistic development of students, Zobel further developed the intellect and artistry of its students with the establishment of the Angelo King Center for the Performing Arts in 2000, which is housed in the school's Center for the Performing Arts Building. Since its establishment, the Center has organized yearly Performing Arts Festivals which have showcased the different performing arts groups of the school. These groups include the DLSZ Symphony Orchestra, the DLSZ Strings, the DLSZ Band, the DLSZ Chorale, the Rondalla Ensemble and in addition, the Center continues to hold yearly productions of hit musicals, a tradition started during the early years of Zobel.

It has also hosted a number of performing groups from De La Salle University such as the DLSU Pops Orchestra, the DLSU Chorale, and the Chamber Ensemble. Activities, which have been organized at the Center, have been facilitated by highly acclaimed organizations including the UP Theater Arts, CenterStage, Ballet Philippines, Philippine Madrigal Singers, Philippine Ballet Theatre, and the Royal Academy of Dance. In 2002, the Center for Performing Arts was on national television weekly venue-hosting GMA7's popular quiz show, LG Quiz. In 2003, Don Randi, an American jazz musician held a jazz and fusion clinic and concert at the Center.

In 2004, recognizing the role of the Center in promoting culture and the arts, the Cultural Center of the Philippines (CCP) officially designated DLSZ Center for Performing Arts as the "CCP of the South." A marker bearing such recognition was unveiled at the lobby of the Center by then CCP President Nestor Jardin, DLSZ's Br. Jaime Dalumpines, FSC, DSLZ-DIPS Director Amanda Boyles, and the head of the Center, Albert Madrigal.

In 2009,

== Athletics ==
Zobel's varsity team, the De La Salle Junior Archers, is De La Salle University-Manila's junior representative to the University Athletic Association of the Philippines while its women's team, the Lady Junior Archers, is De La Salle-College of Saint Benilde's representative to the Women's National Collegiate Athletic Association. During UAAP Season 68, the Junior Archers won its first UAAP Basketball title when it swept the UPIS Junior Maroons, 2–0. It was also La Salle's first Junior's Basketball title in either the NCAA or the UAAP since the De La Salle Greenies of De La Salle College High School (Taft) won the championship in the NCAA in 1955 which was captained by La Salle Basketball Hall-of-Famer Kurt Bachmann. The De La Salle Lady Junior Archers, on the other hand, have been the WNCAA Junior Division Champions for eight straight years, from 1993 to 2000 and again in 2004. Zobel's varsity team for Football on the other hand wins many tournaments and leagues.

== Learning Resource Center ==
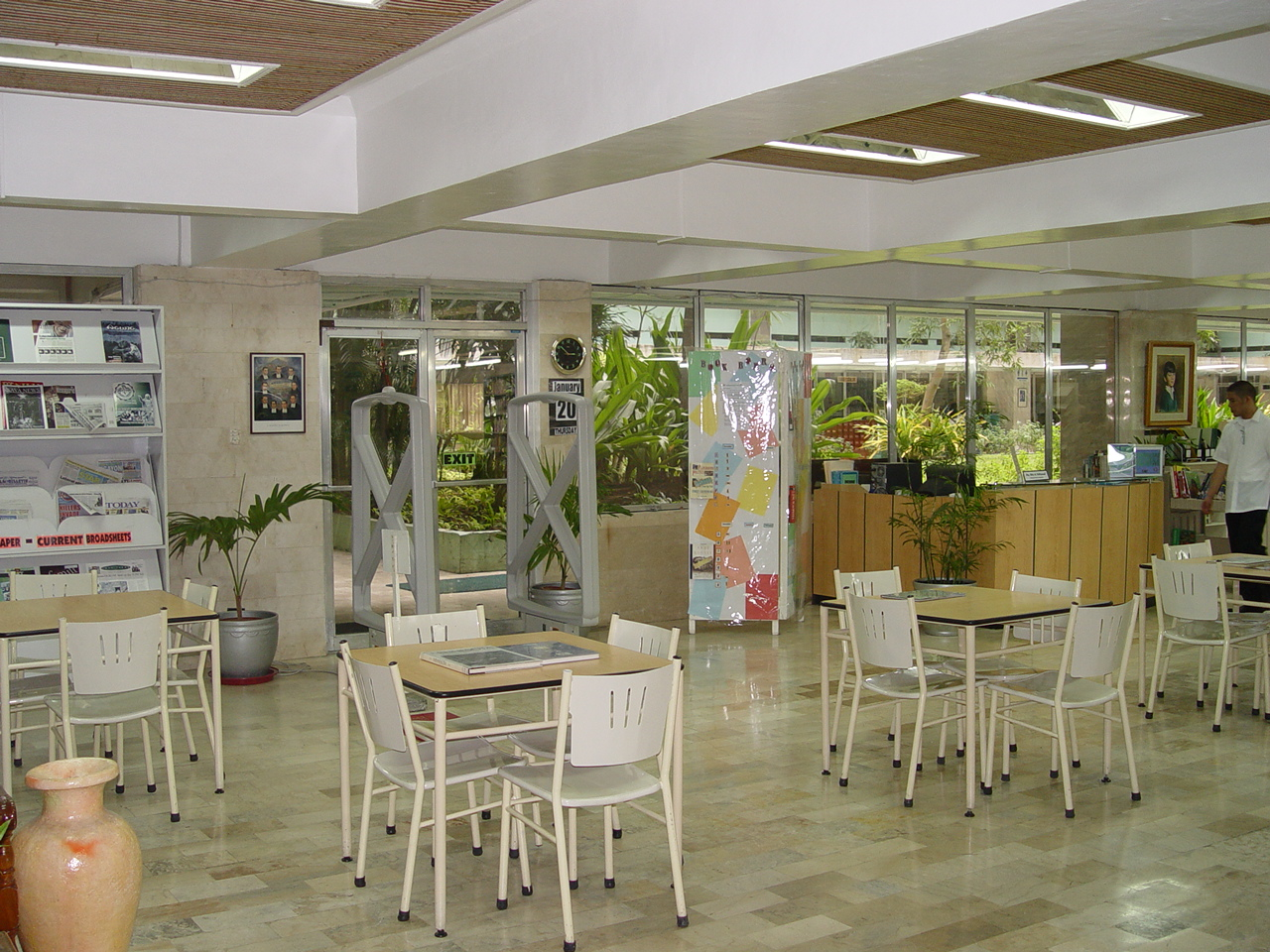
Jacobo Santiago Zobel Memorial Library

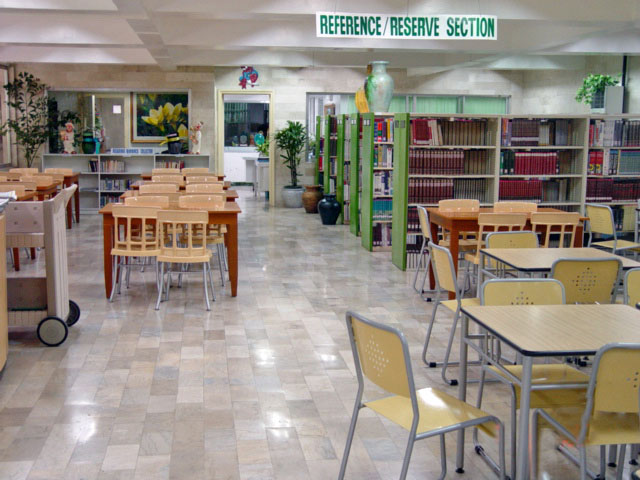
Antonio Montemayor Anievas Memorial Library

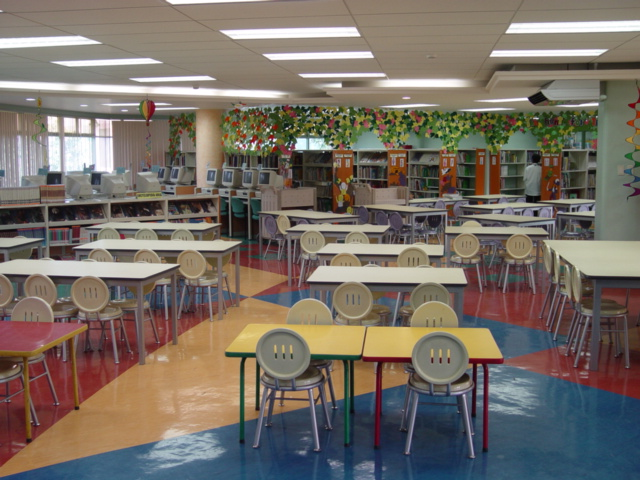
Division 1 Library

The school currently has 3 Learning Resource Centers, one each for the Prep Level, the Grade School Department, and the High School Department, that provide both conventional print and non-print materials to the school community. In addition to these Centers, the school also maintains an Archives unit that is also under Learning Resource Center; the Archives is located at the St. La Salle Building.

The Jacobo Santiago Zobel Memorial Library is the school's primary library and serves the High School Department. The library has two main sections, print and non-print. In 2005, it served 1,128 students, 89 faculty members, 13 administrators, and 82 co-academic personnel.

The Antonio Montemayor Anievas Library serves the Grade School Department and is located just across the Santiago Zobel Memorial Library. It is the second biggest library on campus and has organized various programs, which serve to inculcate the love of reading for the Grade School students such as the Book Lovers and Catch Them Read Programs.

=== Division 1 Library ===
The Division 1 Library serves the Prep levels as well as Grades 1 through 3 of the school. It is located in the St. Br. Miguel Hall and is the newest library on campus. This library was first housed at the Prep Building, which has since been demolished and replaced by the Br. V. Felix Masson and Br. Miguel Halls.

== Adult Night High School (BRAFENHS) ==
The Adult Night High School was opened as a form of outreach to the underprivileged who would want to finish their high school education. It was established during School Year 1997–1998 during the term of Dr. Judith Aldaba. Classes were first held at the Putatan Elementary School and were composed of 69 students in two freshman classes with ages ranging from 14 to 41. Classes were relocated to the Alabang Elementary School during the following school year. In 1999, classes were held at the main campus of De La Salle Zobel.

== Campus ==
The campus is situated on an irregularly shaped lot located at the heart of the Ayala Alabang Village. The campus's master plan was designed by the firm of architect Francisco Mañosa. In the master plan, the main objective was the creation of a unified learning environment, with the school grounds having a countryside atmosphere. In this view, alterations to the natural elements of the lot were kept at a minimum.

When the school opened in 1978, there was only one building available for use, the St. La Salle Building, then called the "Main Building". At present, the campus is composed of a number of structures which have been necessitated by the burgeoning school population. The following major buildings are found on campus:

=== Saint La Salle Building ===
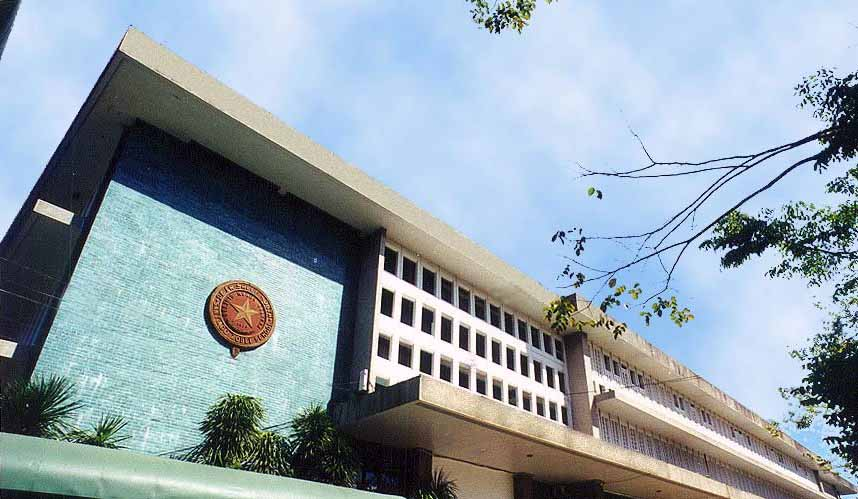
The façade of the St. La Salle Building (Main Building) of DLSZ

The first building on the campus, it houses the Grades 5 to 10 classrooms. The basement level, which was formerly a canteen-cum-multi-purpose hall was turned into the school's Learning Resource Center in 1992. It is composed of one library: the Antonio Montemayor Anievas Memorial Library and an Accounting Office which has replaced the previous High School Library. The facade was where the two flagpoles and the St. La Salle statue were formerly located until 2011 when the former was moved to the St. Mutien Marie Building, and the latter near the Our Lady of the Star (OLSTAR) chapel.

In 2005, the central garden separating the Grade School and High School libraries was converted into an iNook, formerly Cybernook, which houses a considerable number of computers available for use by the school community. The iNook now uses MacBooks. Also constructed was a state-of-the-art "E-Classroom" which is found right beside the iNook. Atop the iNook is a mini courtyard (built in 2005 as well) used for some school activities, which was renovated in 2014.

The ground floor also once housed the offices of the Registrar, the Director, and the Grade School Principal. These offices have since been moved to the newly renovated Mutien-Marie Wiaux Building. At present, the newly renovated Deborah Decena Auditorium (or sometimes known as the Debbie Decena Auditorium), the auditorium, the Information Systems Office, the medical and dental clinics. Beside the Main Building is the newly built, state-of-the-art Our Lady of the Star Chapel where regular masses are held. Beside this chapel is the Parmenie, the new recollection facility. Currently, this floor also houses the classrooms for Grade 5A to 5I, and 6A to 6D, Grades 5 and 6 Student Counseling Rooms, Elite & HS Robotics Rooms, Mimeographing Room, Special Filipino Room, Science and Technology Lobby, Debbie Decena Auditorium (DDA), the main Dental and Medical Clinic, and Hardin ng Batang Lasalyano.

On the second floor, one can find the classrooms for Grades 6E to 6I, 7A to 7I, 8A and the Grades 7 to 8 Student Counseling Rooms, the office of the School Counseling Head, the Faculty Room, the Subject Coordinators’ Office. On the third floor are classrooms for Grade 8B to 8I, 9A to 9I and 10A-10I, High School GEM Room, G9 and G10 Counseling Rooms, and a state-of-the-art computer laboratory. Also found within the St. La Salle Building is a pocket garden, as well as a botanical garden at the rear end of the building.

All classrooms in the Main building are air-conditioned (previously, only the Fourth Year classrooms were air-conditioned until SY 2004-2005 when all classrooms were retrofitted), equipped with Smart TVs that have replaced the previous LCD projectors, and computers connected to the Internet via Wi-Fi. Over the academic years, the Main Building has undergone retrofitting and renovation of facilities and classrooms into more technology-enabled learning areas to support the modern blended learning programs implemented by the school. Most of the classrooms were renovated in 3 phases starting AY 2013-2014 and ending in AY 2015-2016.

=== Saint Brother Mutien-Marie Building ===
In 2005, the Administration Building or the St. Brother Mutien-Marie Building, underwent a total renovation. It was one of the earliest building on campus and now houses the Finance Development Office, Registrar and Admissions office, and the Instructional and Performance Assessment Office. It also houses the president's office, grade school and high school principal's office, the Don Enrique Zobel Board Room, Quality Assurance and Management Office and the Human Resources Management and Development Department office. The building is named after St. Brother Mutien-Marie Wiaux, a De La Salle Christian Brother who taught St. Bertuin's School in Malonne, Belgium where he taught for fifty-eight years. He was canonized in 1989 by Pope John Paul II.

=== Saint Joseph's Building ===
The Saint Joseph Building is home to all of the school's Home Economics and Livelihood Education classes, including Shop, Automotive/Driving, Practical Gardening, Practical Electricity, Cooking, and Sewing, among others and the Grade 5 classes. In 2004, an annex, the THE Building, was built to decongest the original building which was built in 1992. The building houses the Automotive/Driving and Electricity classes at the ground floor, including the garage for the class vehicles, while a gym (Gym 3) occupied the second floor. In 2005, a model home was built by the back of the original building to house the Cooking and Sewing classes. The original building once housed art classes as well as rehearsal rooms for the DLSZ Band and doubles as transient offices for some of the school's units while some buildings on campus are undergoing renovation. For school year 2007–2008, the THELE building has been transformed to a Seniors (4th year) building due to the many other students that applied during its enrollment period thus adding section I to some of the Grade and High School levels. In school year 2010–2011 classrooms for the 7th grade were moved here.

=== Cadlum Hall and St. Flavius Hall ===
In the Edgardo Cadlum Hall, there is the Cafeteria extension on the first floor and on the second floor, the Gym 2 basketball court. Built at the site of the former stand-alone Gym 2, the Cadlum Hall was built to house a multi-purpose hall and the school bookstore at the ground floor, with the Gym 2 being converted to a dedicated basketball court at the second floor. The hall serves as the canteens extension. The building is named after the longest-serving Principal of Zobel, Edgardo S. Cadlum (1932–2010).

The St. Flavius Hall houses the school's main canteen was built in 1991 with the initial food service management being handled by The Aristocrat Restaurant of Engracia Reyes. The immediate past handler of the canteen management was Race Foods, Inc. and at present, it is handled by ZaiDe. The St. Flavius Hall houses, on the first floor, the main canteen and on the second floor the Employees Lounge, Canteen Conference Room and R-Pod, a center for rest, relaxation and rejuvenation for all Lasallian Partners. While this is the main school canteen, a mini-canteen is also located in the Br. Felix Hall. It was named after Br. Flavius Leo FSC, one of the sixteen Christian Brothers who were massacred in the Most Blessed Sacrament Chapel of De La Salle University on Taft Avenue, Manila during the Battle for the Liberation of Manila in World War II.

=== Br. Felix Masson Hall and St. Brother Miguel Halls ===
The Brother V. Felix Masson FSC Hall is named after one of the longest-serving Christian Brothers in the Philippines and, after the recent deaths of Br. Fidelis Leddy FSC(1918–2003) and Br. J. Benedict FSC(1927–2004), the only living American Christian Brother who has been serving in the Philippines for more than fifty years. This building was built in 1997. The classrooms for Grade 2A to 2I, 3A to 3B, GEM/Special Filipino Room, and an outdoor playground are located on the first floor. On the second floor are the classrooms for Grade 3C to 3I, 4A to 4G classrooms and the ISRS Extension Office. In the Br. Felix Masson annex building, the Music Room is located on the first floor, the classrooms for Grade 4H to 4I are on the second floor, and on the third floor are the Science Laboratory and Computer Technology classroom.

The newly built St. Brother Miguel Hall, named after St. Br. Miguel Febres Cordero Muñoz FSC, houses the Br. Miguel Febres building basement, where the Art Room, Music Room, Cafeteria annex, Psychometrician/MSSN Coordinator's Office and the Staff Union Office are located. On the first floor is an outdoor playground, the Multipurpose Hall, Medical Clinic Annex, Classrooms for Grades 1A to 1H and the interdisciplinary Botanical Garden. On the second floor is the Gym 5, Learning Resource Center Grades 1 to 4 Student Counselling Rooms, office of Grade School Student Formation Officer, office of the Subject Coordinators, and the office of the Upper Grades Vice Principal for Operations.

=== Br. Andrew Gonzalez Hall (previously known as the Vaugirard) ===
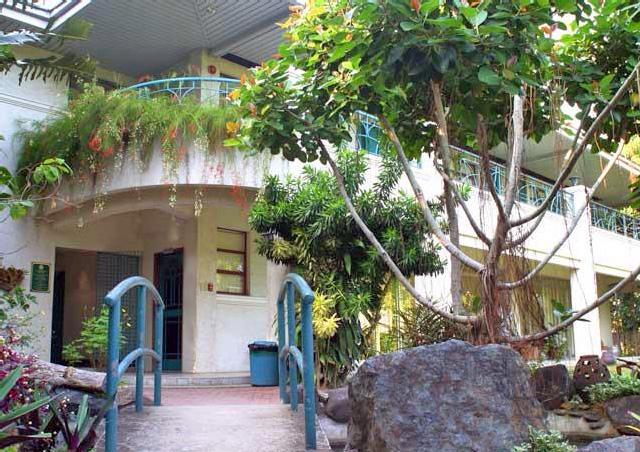
The bridge leading to the entrance of the Br. Andrew Gonzalez Hall

The Br. Andrew Gonzalez Hall, previously known as The Vaugirard, is a gated compound in the school. The Br. Andrew Gonzales Hall houses, on the ground floor, an outdoor playground, the Pre-K to Kinder classrooms, Faculty Room and Meeting Room. On the second floor is the Learning Resource Center, Grade 4 Robotics Rooms and the Office of the Vice Principal for Operations for Lower Grades.

=== Angelo King Center for the Performing Arts and Sylvia P. Lina Theatre ===
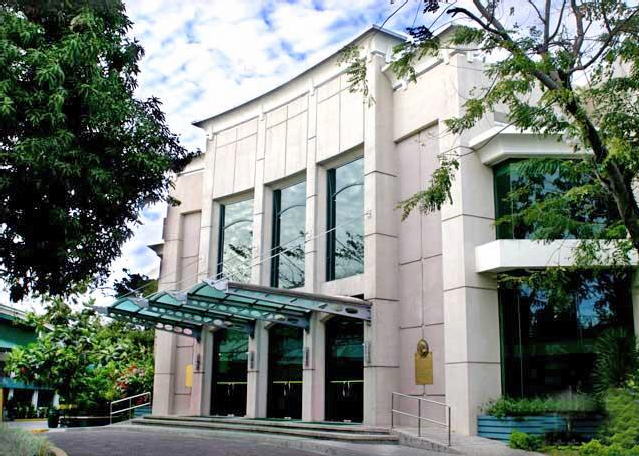
The façade of the Angelo King Center for the Performing Arts

In 1996, the school began construction on a building which would house its proposed Center for the Performing Arts. In 2000, this building was completed and would be named after DLSU alumnus Angelo King, who had contributed a significant amount to help finish its construction. The Angelo King Center has a Php150 million theater equipped with state-of-the-art lights and sound facilities, which were imported form Germany. The theater has a seating capacity of 1,052 with balcony and orchestra sections, a two-level lobby, an orchestra pit, four air-conditioned dressing rooms, costume cabinets, a docking area, sixteen fly battens, two motorized curtain systems (vertical and horizontal), and comfort rooms. The television program Digital LG Quiz game show was hosted by 2 Lasallians - LSGH alumnus David Celdran and DLSU alumnae Bianca Araneta who taped several episodes at the King Center Theater for several years.

The building houses the rehearsal rooms of the performing arts groups of the school, as well as the music and art classrooms. There are also two box offices located in the building, one at the ground level of the lobby, and one at the upper level, just by the dance studio. The Performing Arts Center is currently under complete renovation of the main theater. The building also houses the Music and Art rooms. Adjacent to the Building is the DLSZ Alumni Association Office and the Independent Teachers Union Office.

=== Br. Ceci Hojilla FSC Center for Lasallian Formation ===
The Br. Ceci Hojilla FSC Center for Lasallian Formation or CLF (near Gate 1) houses the Our Lady of the Star Chapel and below it is the CLF Hall, two (2) Recollection Rooms, and the Family Life Wellness Institute (FLWI). The CLF also houses the Campus Ministry Office and the Social Action Office with the Parmenie Retreat Facility which has the male dormitory on the second floor and female dormitory on the third floor. Each dormitory can accommodate 40 overnight guests.

=== Our Lady of the Star Chapel ===
The Our Lady of the Star Chapel on the second floor of the Br. Ceci Hojilla, FSC Center for Lasallian Formation has its own choir loft and can accommodate 460 people.

=== Athletic facilities ===
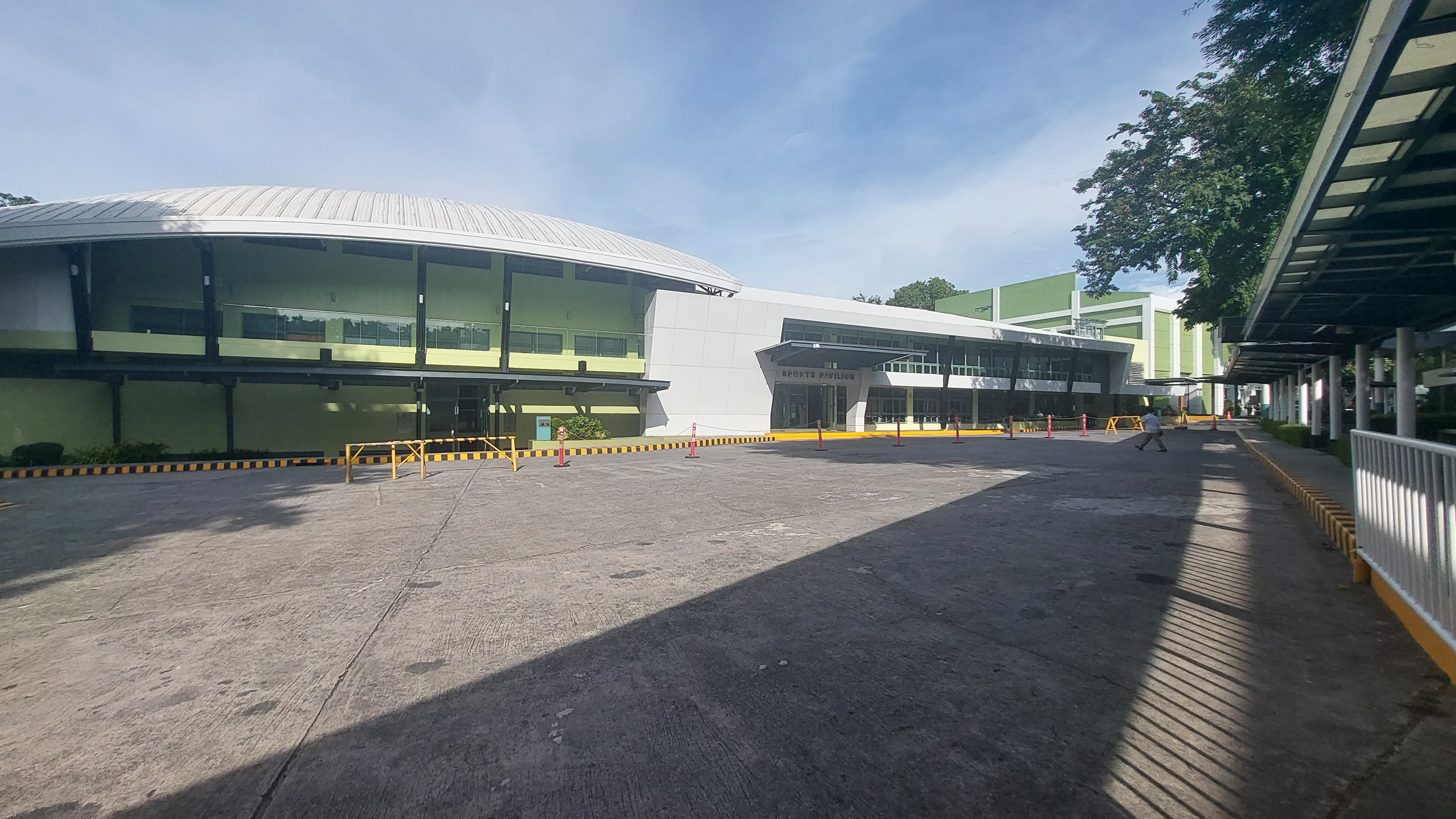
Sports Pavilion in 2024

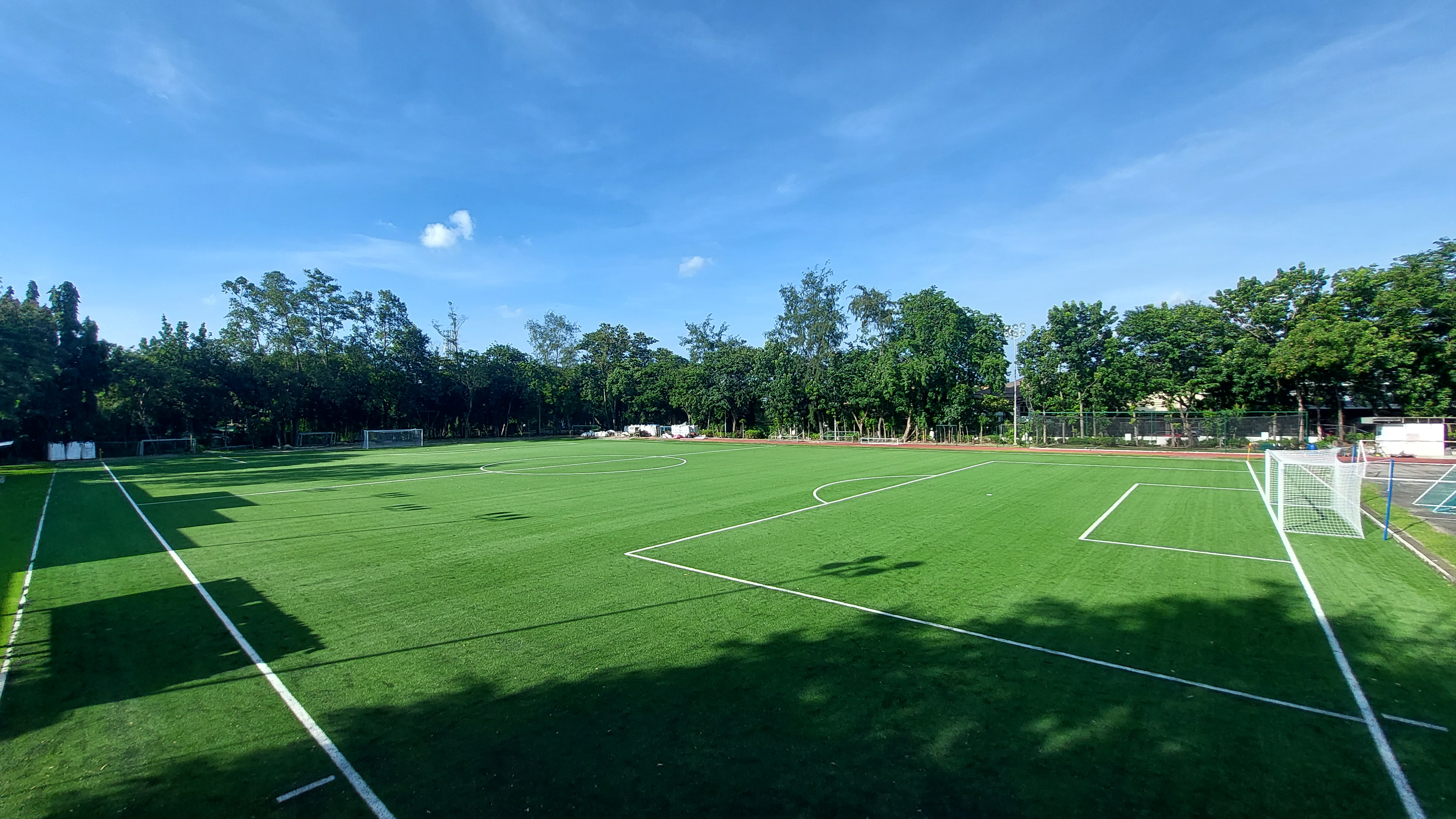
Football Field in 2024 after renovation.

The Campus has a state-of-the-art Sports Pavilion, used for different events such as Physical Education Classes, Intramurals Events, Eucharistic celebrations, etc.

The campus is also home to an Olympic-size swimming pool which was constructed in the mid-1990s. In 2005, the pool house was rebuilt and is now a multi-level building with locker & shower rooms at the ground floor and spectator-stands at the upper level. Right beside the swimming pool are the tennis courts, one of the oldest facilities located on campus.

The school also has a full-sized football field, which is located behind the Mutien-Marie Building, as well as baseball and softball fields, which are located by The Vaugirard. Because of these facilities, Zobel has been host to many athletic competitions, especially soccer matches.

== Santiago Zobel ==
Jacobo Santiago "Santi" Zobel, after whom the school is named, was the eldest son of De La Salle Alumnus and Benefactor- Don Enrique Zobel. Enrique Zobel was then the President of the Ayala Corporation when De La Salle-Zobel was established. Santiago was born on August 15, 1954, and died of pneumonia on September 7, 1965, at the age of 11.

== Notable alumni ==
- Andi Abaya
- Andres Aldeguer
- Cristina Aldeguer-Roque
- Alvin Aguilar
- Rolando Andaya Jr.
- Simon Atkins
- Marion Aunor
- Nathan Azarcon
- Eric Buhain
- Migs Bustos
- Luis Campos
- Angel Canino
- Anicka Castañeda
- Sara Castañeda
- Rodjun Cruz
- Alisha del Campo
- John Carlos de los Reyes
- Patrick Deyto
- Kim Kianna Dy
- Nico Elorde
- Mark Escueta
- Jeric Fortuna
- Vanie Gandler
- Bianca Gonzalez
- Richard Gutierrez
- River Joseph
- Maricel Laxa
- G3 Misa
- Lola Amour
- Evan Nelle
- Sam Oh
- Rhian Ramos
- Jolo Revilla
- Mariel Rodriguez
- Gino M. Santos
- Juno Sauler
- Renzo Subido
- Arnold Van Opstal
- Rico Yan
