= 2019 Women's Volleyball Kor Royal Cup =

2019 Women's Kor Royal Cup
Tournament details
- Host country: Thailand
- City: Sisaket
- Dates: 5 July – 9 July
- Teams: 6
- Venue: 1 (in 1 host city)

Final positions
- Champions: (Thailand) PEA Sisaket (N/Ath title)
- Runners-up: (Japan) Okayama Seagulls
- Third place: (Thailand) 3BB Nakornnont
- Fourth place: (Thailand) Thai-Denmark Khonkaen Star

The 2019 Women's Volleyball Kor Royal Cup is the latest edition of the Women's Volleyball Kor Royal Cup, the tournament patronized by Princess Maha Chakri Sirindhorn, The Princess Royal of Thailand for women's senior volleyball clubs, also known as 2019 Sealect Tuna Women's Senior Volleyball Kor Royal Cup Thailand Championship due to the sponsorship deal with Sealect Tuna. A total of 6 teams competed in the tournament.

== Teams ==
| Team | Qualified as |
|---|---|
| (Thailand) PEA Sisaket | Hosts |
| (Thailand) Thai-Denmark Khonkaen Star | Thailand League member |
| (Thailand) 3BB Nakornnont | Thailand League member |
| (Japan) Okayama Seagulls | Wild Card |
| Australia | Wild Card |
| Philippines | Wild Card |

== Pools composition ==
| Pool A | Pool B |
|---|---|
| (Thailand) PEA Sisaket | (Japan) Okayama Seagulls |
| (Thailand) Thai-Denmark Khonkaen Star | Philippines U23 |
| Australia | (Thailand) 3BB Nakornnont |

== Preliminary round ==
All times are Indochina Time (UTC+07:00).

=== Pool standing procedure ===
1. Number of matches won
2. Match points
3. Sets ratio
4. Points ratio
5. If the tie continues as per the point ratio between two teams, the priority will be given to the team which won the last match between them. When the tie in points ratio is between three or more teams, a new classification of these teams in the terms of points 1, 2 and 3 will be made taking into consideration only the matches in which they were opposed to each other.

Match won 3–0 or 3–1: 3 match points for the winner, 0 match points for the loser
Match won 3–2: 2 match points for the winner, 1 match point for the loser

=== Pool A ===
| Pos | Team | Pld | W | L | Pts | SW | SL | SR | SPW | SPL | SPR | Qualification |
|---|---|---|---|---|---|---|---|---|---|---|---|---|
| 1 | PEA Sisaket (H) | 2 | 2 | 0 | 6 | 6 | 0 | MAX | 0 | 0 | — | Semi-finals |
| 2 | Thai-Denmark Khonkaen Star | 2 | 1 | 1 | 3 | 3 | 3 | 1.000 | 0 | 0 | — | Semi-finals |
| 3 | Australia | 2 | 0 | 2 | 0 | 2 | 6 | 0.333 | 0 | 0 | — | Fifth place play-off |

Rules for classification: Pool standing procedure
(H) Host

| Date | Time | | Score | | Set 1 | Set 2 | Set 3 | Set 4 | Set 5 | Total | Report |
|---|---|---|---|---|---|---|---|---|---|---|---|
| 5 Jul | 17:00 | Thai-Denmark Khonkaen Star | 3–2 | Australia | | | | | | | |
| 6 Jul | 19:30 | PEA Sisaket | 3–0 | Australia | | | | | | | |
| 7 Jul | 19:30 | Thai-Denmark Khonkaen Star | 0–3 | PEA Sisaket | | | | | | | |

=== Pool B ===
| Pos | Team | Pld | W | L | Pts | SW | SL | SR | SPW | SPL | SPR | Qualification |
|---|---|---|---|---|---|---|---|---|---|---|---|---|
| 1 | (Japan) Okayama Seagulls | 2 | 2 | 0 | 6 | 6 | 1 | 6.000 | 0 | 0 | — | Semi-finals |
| 2 | 3BB Nakornnont | 2 | 1 | 1 | 3 | 3 | 3 | 1.000 | 0 | 0 | — | Semi-finals |
| 3 | Philippines U23 | 2 | 0 | 2 | 0 | 0 | 6 | 0.000 | 0 | 0 | — | Fifth place play-off |

Rules for classification: Pool standing procedure

| Date | Time | | Score | | Set 1 | Set 2 | Set 3 | Set 4 | Set 5 | Total | Report |
|---|---|---|---|---|---|---|---|---|---|---|---|
| 5 Jul | 19:30 | Okayama Seagulls (Japan) | 3–0 | Philippines U23 | | | | | | | |
| 6 Jul | 17:00 | 3BB Nakornnont | 3–0 | Philippines U23 | | | | | | | |
| 7 Jul | 17:00 | 3BB Nakornnont | 0–3 | (Japan) Okayama Seagulls | | | | | | | |

== Final round ==
All times are Indochina Time (UTC+07:00).

Semi-finals
8 July
PEA Sisaket | 3
3BB Nakornnont | 0
8 July
Thai-Denmark Khonkaen Star | 0
(Japan) Okayama Seagulls | 3

Final
9 July
PEA Sisaket | 3
(Japan) Okayama Seagulls | 1
Third place play-off
9 July
3BB Nakornnont | 3
Thai-Denmark Khonkaen Star | 1

| Fifth place play-off |
| 9 July |
| Philippines U23 | 0 |
| Australia | 3 |

== Final standings ==
| อันดับ | ทีม |
|---|---|
| 1st place, gold medalist(s) | PEA Sisaket |
| 2nd place, silver medalist(s) | (Japan) Okayama Seagulls |
| 3rd place, bronze medalist(s) | 3BB Nakornnont |
| 4 | Thai-Denmark Khonkaen Star |
| 5 | Australia |
| 6 | Philippines U23 |

2019 Women's Volleyball Kor Royal Cup

PEA Sisaket
