= Barreto (surname) =

Barreto (Portuguese pronunciation: [ba'ʁetu]) is a surname of Portuguese origin, also found in the former Portuguese colonies of Brazil, Angola, Mozambique, Timor-Leste and Goa as well as Spain, Latin America and The Philippines. In 1786, the title of Conde de Casa Barreto was created by King Charles III of Spain and bestowed upon Jacinto Tomás Barreto of Havana, Cuba.

Occasionally, the surname has been spelled Barretto in the United States (e.g. Larry Barretto and Ray Barretto).

== People with the surname ==
=== Academics ===
- Ada Kouri Barreto (1917–2005), Cuban cardiologist
- Fausto Barreto (1852–1915), Brazilian philologist
- Jenny Anne Barretto, Filipina geologist and geophysicist
- Lourdino Barreto (1938–1997), musicologist
- Matt A. Barreto (born 1976), American political scientist
- Paulo S. L. M. Barreto (born 1965), Brazilian cryptographer

=== Artists and writers ===
- Alexandra Barreto (born 1975), American actress
- António Garcia Barreto (born 1948), Portuguese writer
- Brian Barreto (born 1978) Filipino/American Photographer
- Santino Barreto (born 2011) Brazilian film director
- Chiquita Barreto (born 1947), Paraguayan writer
- Claudine Barretto (born 1979), Filipino actress
- Eduardo Barreto (1954–2011), Uruguayan comics artist
- Don Marino Barreto Jr. (1925–1971), Cuban singer
- Fábio Barreto (1957–2019), Brazilian filmmaker
- Federico Barreto (1862–1929), Peruvian poet and writer
- Gretchen Barretto (born 1970), Filipina actress
- Guillermo Barreto (1929–1991), Cuban musician
- Juan Cancio Barreto (born 1950), Paraguayan musician
- Juan Carlos Barreto (born 1957), Mexican actor
- Julia Barretto (born 1997), Filipina actress
- Júlio Francisco Adeodato Barreto (1905–1937), Indo-Portuguese writer
- Krissann Barretto (born 1995), Indian actress
- Larry Barretto (1890–1971), American novelist and war correspondent
- Lia Menna Barreto (born 1959), Brazilian artist
- Lima Barreto (1881–1922), Brazilian writer
- Lima Barreto (director) (1906–1982), Brazilian director
- Luiz Carlos Barreto (born 1928), Brazilian film producer
- Marjorie Barretto (born 1974), Filipina actress
- Pepe Barreto, Peruvian-American entertainment reporter
- Rafael Barreto (singer) (born 1985), Brazilian singer/songwriter
- Ray Barretto (1929–2006), Puerto Rican-American bandleader and percussionist
- Rhianne Barreto (born 1997/1998), British actress
- Román Viñoly Barreto (1914–1970), Uruguayan-Argentine film director
- Tobias Barreto (1839–1889), Brazilian writer

=== Clergy ===
- Anthony Alwyn Fernandes Barreto, Bishop of Sindhudurg
- Melchior Nunes Barreto, 16th-century missionary
- Pascual Díaz y Barreto (1876–1936), Mexican prelate
- Pedro Barreto (born 1944), Peruvian Catholic cardinal
- Ricardo Aldo Barreto Cairo (born 1968), Venezuelan Roman Catholic bishop

=== Military personnel ===
- Antonio Barreto, Sri Lankan Sinhala Karava soldier who gained the title "Prince of Uva" under the name Kuruvita Rala in the Kingdom of Kandy
- Isabel Barreto (1567–1612), first woman to be a navy Admiral
- Jorge Otero Barreto (born 1937), American soldier
- João de Deus Mena Barreto (1874–1933), member of the military junta which governed Brazil
- José Luís Mena Barreto (1817–79), Brazilian military leader
- Luís do Rego Barreto (1777–1840), Portuguese military leader and colonial administrator

=== Politicians ===
- Francisco Barreto (1520–1573), Portuguese military, explorer and Viceroy of Portuguese India from 1555 to 1558
- Greg Barreto, American politician
- Hector Barreto Jr., 21st Administrator of the U.S. Small Business Administration
- Honório Barreto (1813–1859), Luso-African Governor of the Portuguese colony of Guinea
- Jackson Barreto, governor of Sergipe, Brazil
- Jorge Barreto Xavier (born 1965), Portuguese cultural manager, Secretary of State for Culture of Portugal from October 2012 to October 2015
- Juan Barreto (born 1959), Venezuelan politician and mayor of Caracas (2004–2008)
- Leonardo Argüello Barreto (1875–1947), President of Nicaragua
- Manuel Delgado Barreto (1879–1936), Spanish far-right politician
- Pascoela Barreto (born 1946), East Timorese civil servant and diplomat
- Roberto Molina Barreto (born 1955), Guatemalan attorney-general

=== Sportspeople ===
- Rodrigo Nicolás Barreto (nacido el 26/05/1998) Argentino Fútbolista ahre
- André Barreto (born 1979), Brazilian footballer
- Augusto Barreto (1923–2017), Portuguese fencer
- Carlos Barreto (boxer) (1976–1999), Venezuelan boxer
- Carlos Barreto (fighter) (born 1968), Brazilian MMA fighter
- Claudemir Jeronimo Barreto (born 1981), Brazilian footballer better known as Cacau
- Diego Barreto (born 1981), Paraguayan football goalkeeper
- Édgar Barreto (born 1984), Paraguayan football player, brother of Diego Barreto
- Francisco Barretto Júnior (born 1989), Brazilian gymnast
- Franklin Barreto (born 1991), Venezuelan baseball player
- Gonzalo Barreto (born 1992), Uruguayan football player
- Gustavo Bonatto Barreto (born 1991), Brazilian football player
- Herman Barreto (born 1926), Venezuelan sport shooter
- Hernan Barreto (born 1991), Argentine Paralympic athlete
- Jhonlen Barreto (born 1987), Venezuelan volleyball player
- Jose Ramirez Barreto (born 1976), Brazilian football player
- Juciely Cristina Barreto (born 1980), Brazilian volleyball player
- Kaleem Barreto, Scottish rugby union player
- Marcos Barreto (born 1960), Mexican runner
- Mariano Barreto (born 1957), Portuguese football manager
- Mickaël Barreto (born 1991), French football player
- Miguel Barreto, Argentine football player
- Nuno Barreto (born 1972), Portuguese bronze medal winner at 1996 Summer Olympics for Sailing, men's 470 team competition
- Paulo Vitor Barreto (born 1985), Brazilian football player
- Ramón Barreto (1939–2015), Uruguayan football referee
- Sergio Barreto (born 1999), Argentine football player
- Vlademir Jeronimo Barreto (born 1979), Brazilian football player
- Vincy Barretto (born 1999), Indian football player
- Ysis Barreto (born 1980), Venezuelan judoka

== See also ==
- Barreto (disambiguation)
