= UAAP Season 87 =

Athletics in the Philippines

- "Stronger, Better, Together"
- Host school: University of the Philippines

Overall
- Seniors: University of Santo Tomas
- Juniors: University of Santo Tomas

Collegiate champions
Sport		Men	Women
Basketball		UP	NU
Volleyball		NU	NU
Beach volleyball		UST	NU
Badminton		NU	UP
Football		FEU	FEU
Baseball		NU	NT
Softball		NT	Adamson
Chess		Standard; UST; Rapid; UST (DS); Blitz; FEU (DS)	Standard; FEU; Rapid; FEU (DS); Blitz; Ateneo (DS)
Swimming		Ateneo	Ateneo
Table tennis		UST	UST
Athletics		UP	FEU
Taekwondo		La Salle	NU
Judo		UST	UE
Fencing		UE	UST
Tennis		NU	UST
3x3 basketball		La Salle	Ateneo
- Poomsae: UST (Coed)
- Esports: First Semester; NBA 2K24 – Ateneo; Valorant – La Salle; MLBB – UE; Second Semester; NBA 2K25 – Ateneo; Valorant – La Salle; MLBB – La Salle (Ex - Coed)
- Cheerdance: NU (Ex - Coed)
- Street dance: UP (Ex - Coed)

High School champions
Sport		Boys	Girls
Basketball		UST	UST
Volleyball		UST	NU
Beach volleyball		UST	NU
Football		UST	NT
Chess		Standard; FEU; Rapid; FEU (DS); Blitz; UST (DS)	Standard; FEU; Rapid; UST (DS); Blitz; NU (DS)
Swimming		UST	UST
Table tennis		UST	UST
Athletics		UST	UE
Taekwondo		NU	NT
Judo		UE	UE
Fencing		UE	UE
3x3 basketball		FEU (HS); Ateneo (JHS)	UST
- Street dance: NU (Ex - Coed)
- (NT) = No tournament; (DS) = Demonstration Sport; (Ex) = Exhibition;

UAAP Season 87 was the 2024–25 season of the University Athletic Association of the Philippines (UAAP). It was hosted by the University of the Philippines Diliman (UP) under the theme "Stronger, Better, Together". The opening ceremony was held on September 7, 2024.

Starting this season, a change was introduced regarding the transfer of student athletes from one school to another. Transferees will still be required to sit out for one year before playing for their new school but their five years of eligibility will have to be reduced by two instead of one year.

This is also the first season where guest teams are invited, with Claret School of Quezon City and PAREF Southridge School signing a Memorandum of Agreement with UAAP to join in the High School Boys' Division which will start on January 18, 2025.

The season also marked the most televised sports in the league's history with basketball (all divisions), volleyball (all divisions), football (all divisions), baseball (all games), softball (finals), cheerdance, esports, badminton (finals), lawn tennis (finals), 3x3 basketball (all divisions), beach volleyball (finals), fencing (all divisions), and streetdance receiving live broadcasts via broadcasting partner Cignal TV.

== Sports calendar ==
Esports made its UAAP debut as a special exhibition event featuring three titles, while Rapid and Blitz Chess was introduced as a demonstration sport. On the other hand, the football tournaments were transferred to the first semester for the first time.

=== First semester ===
Sport (Division)	Event Sub-Host	Duration	Venue/s
Esports (Collegiate)	Ateneo de Manila University	Aug 13–21, 2024	Areté Ateneo; Dark League Studios
Opening Ceremony	University of the Philippines	Sep 7, 2024	Smart Araneta Coliseum
Basketball (Collegiate & Junior High School)	University of the Philippines	Sep 7 – Dec 20, 2024	Smart Araneta Coliseum; SM Mall of Asia Arena; Adamson University Gym; UST Quadricentennial Pavilion; Filoil EcoOil Centre
Volleyball (High School)	University of Santo Tomas	Sep 14 – Dec 8, 2024	Paco Arena; UST Quadricentennial Pavilion; Filoil EcoOil Centre
Football (Collegiate)	Far Eastern University	Sep 15 – Dec 15, 2024	UP Diliman Football Stadium; Rizal Memorial Stadium
Badminton (Collegiate)	National University	Oct 12–30, 2024	Rizal Memorial Badminton Hall
Chess (Standard) (Collegiate & High School)	Adamson University	Oct 12 – Nov 19, 2024	Adamson University Gym
Beach Volleyball (Collegiate)	National University	Nov 15–26, 2024	Sands at SM by the Bay
Athletics (Collegiate & High School)	Ateneo de Manila University	Nov 17–21, 2024	New Clark City Athletics Stadium
Swimming (Collegiate & High School)	Ateneo de Manila University	Nov 17–20, 2024	New Clark City Aquatic Center
Table Tennis (Collegiate & High School)	De La Salle University	Nov 19–25, 2024	Ayala Malls Manila Bay
Taekwondo (Collegiate & High School)	Far Eastern University	Nov 19–21, 2024	Rizal Memorial Coliseum
Cheerdance (Collegiate)	Ateneo de Manila University	Dec 1, 2024	SM Mall of Asia Arena
Judo (Collegiate & High School)	Far Eastern University	Dec 14–15, 2024	Ninoy Aquino Stadium

=== Second semester ===
Sport (Division)	Event Sub-Host	Duration	Venue/s
Football (High School)	Far Eastern University	Jan 18 – Mar 29, 2025	UP Diliman Football Stadium
Basketball (High School)	University of Santo Tomas	Jan 19 – Mar 27, 2025	Filoil EcoOil Centre
Beach Volleyball (High School)	National University	Jan 24 – Feb 2, 2025	Sands at SM by the Bay
Volleyball (Collegiate)	University of the Philippines	Feb 15 – May 17, 2025	SM Mall of Asia Arena; Filoil EcoOil Centre; Smart Araneta Coliseum; PhilSports Arena
Tennis (Collegiate)	Ateneo de Manila University	Feb 22 – Apr 13, 2025	Felicisimo Ampon Tennis Center
Softball (Collegiate)	Adamson University	Feb 25 – Apr 5, 2025	Rizal Memorial Baseball Stadium
Baseball (Collegiate)	Adamson University	Feb 26 – May 6, 2025	Rizal Memorial Baseball Stadium
Chess (Rapid and Blitz) (Collegiate & High School)	Adamson University	Mar 22 – Apr 5, 2025	Adamson University Gym
Fencing (Collegiate & High School)	De La Salle University	Apr 22–25, 2025	Rizal Memorial Coliseum
3x3 Basketball (Collegiate, High School, & Junior High School)	University of the East	Apr 28 – May 4, 2025	Ayala Malls Manila Bay
Esports (Collegiate)	Ateneo de Manila University	May 7–16, 2025	Gateway Mall 2 Quantum Skyview
Streetdance (Collegiate & High School)	Ateneo de Manila University	May 20, 2025	SM Mall of Asia Arena
Closing Ceremony	University of the Philippines	May 20, 2025	SM Mall of Asia Arena

== Basketball ==
=== Men's tournament ===
==== Elimination round ====
Pos	Team	W	L	PCT	GB	Qualification
1	De La Salle Green Archers	12	2	.857	—	Twice-to-beat in the semifinals
2	UP Fighting Maroons (H)	11	3	.786	1	Twice-to-beat in the semifinals
3	UST Growling Tigers	7	7	.500	5	Twice-to-win in the semifinals
4	Adamson Soaring Falcons	6	8	.429 (Note: Fourth seed playoff: Adamson 68–55 UE)	6	Twice-to-win in the semifinals
5	UE Red Warriors	6	8	.429	6	
6	FEU Tamaraws	5	9	.357 (Note: Head-to-head record: FEU 1–1 (+5) NU)	7	
7	NU Bulldogs	5	9	.357	7	
8	Ateneo Blue Eagles	4	10	.286	8	

Source: UAAP on Livestats
(H) Hosts

==== Playoffs ====
Semifinals (Top 2 twice-to-beat)
1	La Salle	70
4	Adamson	55
2	UP	78
3	UST	69

Finals (Best-of-three playoff)
1	La Salle	65	76	62
2	UP	73	75	66

==== Awards ====
- Most Valuable Player: Kevin Quiambao (De La Salle Green Archers)
- Rookie of the Year: Veejay Pre (FEU Tamaraws)

=== Women's tournament ===
==== Elimination round ====
Pos	Team	W	L	PCT	GB	Qualification
1	NU Lady Bulldogs	14	0	1.000	—	Advance to the Finals (Note: As NU won all of their elimination round games, the stepladder format was used instead of the regular Final Four format.)
2	UST Growling Tigresses	12	2	.857	2	Advance to stepladder round 2
3	Adamson Lady Falcons	9	5	.643	5	Proceed to stepladder round 1
4	Ateneo Blue Eagles	8	6	.571	6	Proceed to stepladder round 1
5	UP Fighting Maroons (H)	5	9	.357	9	
6	De La Salle Lady Archers	4	10	.286	10	
7	FEU Lady Tamaraws	3	11	.214	11	
8	UE Lady Warriors	1	13	.071	13	

(H) Hosts

==== Playoffs ====
Stepladder round 1 (Single-elimination)
3	Adamson	59*
4	Ateneo	53

Stepladder round 2 (Single-elimination)
2	UST	71
3	Adamson	59

Finals (Best-of-three playoff)
1	NU	72	68	78
2	UST	71	78	73

*Overtime

==== Awards ====
- Most Valuable Player: Kacey Dela Rosa (Ateneo Blue Eagles)
- Rookie of the Year: Cielo Pagdulagan (NU Lady Bulldogs)

=== Boys' tournament ===
==== Elimination round ====
Pos	Team	W	L	PCT	GB	Qualification
1	NUNS Bullpups	13	1	.929	—	Twice-to-beat in the semifinals
2	UST Tiger Cubs (H)	12	2	.857	1	Twice-to-beat in the semifinals
3	FEU–D Baby Tamaraws	9	5	.643	4	Twice-to-win in the semifinals
4	Adamson Baby Falcons	7	7	.500	6	Twice-to-win in the semifinals
5	UE Junior Red Warriors	6	8	.429 (Note: Head-to-head record: UE 2–0 DLSZ)	7	
6	Zobel Junior Archers	6	8	.429	7	
7	Ateneo Blue Eagles	3	11	.214	10	
8	UPIS Junior Fighting Maroons	0	14	.000	13	

Rules for classification: 1) winning percentage; 2) if tied for No. 2 or 4, one-game playoff; 3) head-to-head record; 4) head-to-head point differential; 5) overall point differential
(H) Hosts

==== Playoffs ====
Semifinals (Top 2 twice-to-beat)
1	NUNS	64
4	Adamson	62
2	UST	75
3	FEU–D	63

Finals (Best-of-three playoff)
1	NUNS	77	85	77
2	UST	70	89	83*

*Overtime

==== Awards ====
- Most Valuable Player: Kieffer Alas (Zobel Junior Archers)
- Best Foreign Student-Athlete: Collins Akowe (NUNS Bullpups)
- Rookie of the Year: Jhustin Hallare (NUNS Bullpups)

=== Girls' tournament ===
==== Elimination round ====
Pos	Team	W	L	PCT	GB	Qualification
1	UST Junior Tigresses (H)	6	0	1.000	—	Advance to the Finals
2	NUNS Lady Bullpups	4	2	.667	2	Advance to the Finals
3	Zobel Junior Lady Archers	2	4	.333	4	
4	Ateneo Blue Eagles	0	6	.000	6	

Rules for classification: 1) winning percentage; 2) if tied for No. 2, one-game playoff; 3) head-to-head record; 4) head-to-head point differential; 5) overall point differential
(H) Hosts

==== Finals ====
Team 1	Series	Team 2	Game 1	Game 2	Game 3
UST Junior Tigresses	2–0	NUNS Lady Bullpups	85–57	63–57	—

==== Awards ====
- Most Valuable Player: Barby Dajao (UST Junior Tigresses)
- Rookie of the Year: Rhiane Perez (UST Junior Tigresses)

=== Junior high school tournament ===
==== Elimination round ====
Pos	Team	W	L	PCT	GB	Qualification
1	UE Junior Red Warriors	13	1	.929	—	Twice-to-beat in the semifinals
2	FEU–D Baby Tamaraws	12	2	.857	1	Twice-to-beat in the semifinals
3	UST Tiger Cubs	10	4	.714	3	Twice-to-win in the semifinals
4	NUNS Bullpups	7	7	.500	6	Twice-to-win in the semifinals
5	Zobel Junior Archers	6	8	.429	7	
6	Ateneo Blue Eagles	5	9	.357	8	
7	Adamson Baby Falcons	3	11	.214	10	
8	UPIS Junior Fighting Maroons (H)	0	14	.000	13	

(H) Hosts

==== Playoffs ====
Semifinals (Top 2 twice-to-beat)
1	UE	85
4	NUNS	64
2	FEU–D	75	61
3	UST	84	67

Finals (Best-of-three playoff)
1	UE	84	76	78
3	UST	98	70	47

==== Awards ====
- Most Valuable Player: Zane Kallos (Ateneo Blue Eagles)

== Volleyball ==
=== Men's tournament ===
==== Elimination round ====
Pos	Team	Pld	W	L	Pts	SW	SL	SR	SPW	SPL	SPR	Qualification
1	FEU Tamaraws	14	13	1	39	41	11	3.727	1252	1091	1.148	Twice-to-beat in the semifinals
2	NU Bulldogs	14	12	2	34	37	16	2.313	1236	1126	1.098	Twice-to-beat in the semifinals
3	UST Golden Spikers	14	9	5	27	31	16	1.938	1213	980	1.238	Twice-to-win in the semifinals
4	De La Salle Green Spikers	14	9	5	25	30	23	1.304	1230	1182	1.041	Twice-to-win in the semifinals
5	Ateneo Blue Eagles	14	7	7	21	27	27	1.000	1264	1228	1.029	
6	UP Fighting Maroons (H)	14	4	10	12	20	36	0.556	1123	1289	0.871	
7	Adamson Soaring Falcons	14	2	12	7	14	39	0.359	1091	1220	0.894	
8	UE Red Warriors	14	0	14	3	10	42	0.238	1058	1251	0.846	

Source: UAAP Volleyball on Livestats
Rules for classification: 1) win percentage; 2) if tied for No. 2 or 4, one-game playoff; 3) match points; 4) sets ratio; 5) points ratio; 6) head-to-head record
(H) Host

==== Playoffs ====
Semifinals (Nos. 1 & 2 have twice-to-beat advantage)
1	FEU	3
4	La Salle	1
2	NU	1	3
3	UST	3	0

Finals (Best-of-three playoff)
1	FEU	3	2	0
2	NU	2	3	3

==== Awards ====
- Most Valuable Player: Kennedy Batas (Ateneo Blue Eagles)
- Rookie of the Year: Jan Julian Macam (UST Golden Spikers)

=== Women's tournament ===
==== Elimination round ====
Pos	Team	Pld	W	L	Pts	SW	SL	SR	SPW	SPL	SPR	Qualification
1	NU Lady Bulldogs	14	12	2	34	39	14	2.786	1256	1032	1.217	Twice-to-beat in the semifinals
2	De La Salle Lady Spikers	14	9 (Note: Second seed playoff: La Salle 3–1 UST)	5	27	33	22	1.500	1247	1132	1.102	Twice-to-beat in the semifinals
3	UST Golden Tigresses	14	9	5	28	35	22	1.591	1273	1186	1.073	Twice-to-win in the semifinals
4	FEU Lady Tamaraws	14	9	5	27	32	23	1.391	1257	1196	1.051	Twice-to-win in the semifinals
5	Adamson Lady Falcons	14	6	8	20	26	28	0.929	1141	1172	0.974	
6	UP Fighting Maroons (H)	14	6	8	15	23	33	0.697	1176	1267	0.928	
7	Ateneo Blue Eagles	14	5	9	15	21	32	0.656	1103	1202	0.918	
8	UE Lady Red Warriors	14	0	14	2	7	42	0.167	917	1183	0.775	

Source: UAAP Volleyball on Livestats
Rules for classification: 1) win percentage; 2) if tied for No. 2 or 4, one-game playoff; 3) match points; 4) sets ratio; 5) points ratio; 6) head-to-head record
(H) Host

==== Playoffs ====
Semifinals (Nos. 1 & 2 have twice-to-beat advantage)
1	NU	3
4	FEU	2
2	La Salle	3
3	UST	1

Finals (Best-of-three playoff)
1	NU	3	3
2	La Salle	1	0

==== Awards ====
- Most Valuable Player: Mhicaela Belen (NU Lady Bulldogs)
- Rookie of the Year: Shaina Nitura (Adamson Soaring Falcons)

=== Boys' tournament ===
==== Elimination round ====
Pos	Team	Pld	W	L	Pts	SW	SL	SR	SPW	SPL	SPR	Qualification
1	UST Junior Golden Spikers (H)	14	13	1	40	41	7	5.857	1181	792	1.491	Twice-to-beat in the semifinals
2	NUNS Bullpups	14	12	2	35	38	8	4.750	1101	783	1.406	Twice-to-beat in the semifinals
3	UE Junior Red Warriors	14	11	3	32	34	16	2.125	1167	957	1.219	Twice-to-win in the semifinals
4	Adamson Baby Falcons	14	7 (Note: Fourth seed playoff: Adamson 3–1 FEU-D)	7	21	23	21	1.095	972	892	1.090	Twice-to-win in the semifinals
5	FEU–D Baby Tamaraws	14	7	7	22	28	21	1.333	1104	956	1.155	
6	DLSZ Junior Green Spikers	14	4	10	12	12	30	0.400	749	968	0.774	
7	Ateneo Blue Eagles	14	2	12	6	7	38	0.184	696	1073	0.649	
8	UPIS Junior Fighting Maroons	14	0	14	0	2	42	0.048	551	1100	0.501	

Source: UAAP Volleyball Livestats
Rules for classification: 1) number of wins; 2) if tied for No. 2 or 4, one-game playoff; 3) match points; 4) sets ratio; 5) points ratio; 6) head-to-head record
(H) Host

==== Playoffs ====
Semifinals (Nos. 1 & 2 have twice-to-beat advantage)
1	UST	3
4	Adamson	0
2	NUNS	3
3	UE	2

Final (Best-of-three series)
1	UST	3	3
2	NUNS	1	0

==== Awards ====
- Most Valuable Player: Christian Antonio (UE Junior Red Warriors)
- Rookie of the Year: Kenneth Maliwanag (FEU–D Baby Tamaraws)

=== Girls' tournament ===
==== Elimination round ====
Pos	Team	Pld	W	L	Pts	SW	SL	SR	SPW	SPL	SPR	Qualification
1	NUNS Lady Bullpups	12	11	1	31	34	9	3.778	1000	711	1.406	Twice-to-beat in the semifinals
2	Adamson Lady Baby Falcons	12	9	3	28	32	12	2.667	1013	795	1.274	Twice-to-beat in the semifinals
3	UST Junior Tigresses (H)	12	8	4	26	31	16	1.938	1039	862	1.205	Twice-to-win in the semifinals
4	FEU–D Lady Baby Tamaraws	12	8	4	23	25	15	1.667	937	801	1.170	Twice-to-win in the semifinals
5	DLSZ Junior Lady Spikers	12	4	8	12	13	24	0.542	711	824	0.863	
6	UPIS Junior Lady Maroons	12	2	10	6	6	30	0.200	574	841	0.683	
7	Ateneo Blue Eagles	12	0	12	0	0	36	0.000	461	901	0.512	

Source: UAAP Volleyball Livestats
Rules for classification: 1) number of wins; 2) if tied for No. 2 or 4, one-game playoff; 3) match points; 4) sets ratio; 5) points ratio; 6) head-to-head record
(H) Host

==== Playoffs ====
Semifinals (Nos. 1 & 2 have twice-to-beat advantage)
1	NUNS	3
4	FEU–D	2
2	Adamson	3
3	UST	2

Final (Best-of-three series)
1	NUNS	3	3
2	Adamson	0	0

==== Awards ====
- Most Valuable Player: Sam Cantada (Adamson Lady Baby Falcons)
- Rookie of the Year: Ellaine Gonzalvo (Adamson Lady Baby Falcons)

== Football ==
The UAAP football championships for the collegiate men's division began on September 15, 2024 while the collegiate women's division started on September 21, 2024. The UP Diliman Football Stadium is the venue for both the collegiate and high school division.

=== Men's tournament ===
==== Elimination round ====
Pos	Team	Pld	W	D	L	GF	GA	GD	Pts	Qualification
1	Ateneo Blue Eagles	12	9	1	2	33	12	+21	28	Qualification for semifinals
2	UP Fighting Maroons	12	8	2	2	30	8	+22	26	Qualification for semifinals
3	FEU Tamaraws (H)	12	7	3	2	32	11	+21	24	Qualification for semifinals
4	UST Golden Booters	12	4	2	6	16	22	−6	14	Qualification for semifinals
5	De La Salle Green Booters	12	3	1	8	13	31	−18	10	
6	UE Red Warriors	12	2	3	7	15	31	−16	9	
7	Adamson Soaring Falcons	12	3	0	9	10	34	−24	9	

Source: The UAAP
(H) Hosts

==== Playoffs ====
Semifinals (Knockout)
Dec 8
1	Ateneo	2
4	UST	1
Dec 8
2	UP	0
3	FEU	1

Finals (Knockout)
Dec 15
1	Ateneo	1 (3)
3	FEU (p)	1 (4)

==== Finals ====
December 15, 2024
17:00

Ateneo Blue Eagles	1–1 (a.e.t.)	FEU Tamaraws
Maquiling 72'		Libarnes 65'
Penalties
Maquiling (penalty scored); Cariño (penalty scored); Bengson (penalty scored); Roxas (penalty missed); Flores (penalty missed)	3–4	Libarnes (penalty scored); Aban (penalty missed); Nañiel (penalty scored); Mustapa (penalty scored); Braga (penalty scored)

Rizal Memorial Stadium, Manila
Referee: Mick John Pineda

==== Awards ====
- Most Valuable Player: Mon Diansuy (FEU Tamaraws)
- Rookie of the Year: Edgar Aban Jr. (FEU Tamaraws)
- Golden Boot: Dov Cariño (Ateneo Blue Eagles)
- Best Striker: Leo Maquiling (Ateneo Blue Eagles)
- Best Midfielder: Dov Cariño (Ateneo Blue Eagles)
- Best Defender: Jet Dela Cruz (Ateneo Blue Eagles)
- Best Goalkeeper: Artuz Cezar (Ateneo Blue Eagles)
- Fair Play Award: Ateneo Blue Eagles

=== Women's tournament ===
==== Elimination round ====
Pos	Team	Pld	W	D	L	GF	GA	GD	Pts	Qualification
1	FEU Lady Tamaraws (H)	8	7	1	0	16	2	+14	22	Qualification for finals
2	De La Salle Lady Booters	8	4	2	2	14	7	+7	14	Qualification for finals
3	UST Lady Booters	8	2	2	4	8	9	−1	8	
4	UP Fighting Maroons	8	2	2	4	4	14	−10	8	
5	Ateneo Blue Eagles	8	1	1	6	3	13	−10	4	

Updated to match(es) played on November 30, 2024. Source: The UAAP
(H) Hosts

==== Finals ====
December 14, 2024
17:00

FEU Lady Tamaraws	3–2	De La Salle Lady Booters
Judie Arevalo 28'; Carmela Altiche 45+7' (pen.); Regine Rebosura 68'		Chenny Dañoso 33'; Rochelle Mendaño 57'

Rizal Memorial Stadium, Manila
Referee: Timothy De Castro

==== Awards ====
- Most Valuable Player: Carmela Altiche (FEU Lady Tamaraws)
- Rookie of the Year: Dani Tanjangco (De La Salle Lady Booters)
- Golden Boot: Dionesa Tolentin (FEU Lady Tamaraws) and Dani Tanjangco (De La Salle Lady Booters)
- Best Striker: Dani Tanjangco (De La Salle Lady Booters)
- Best Midfielder: Dionesa Tolentin (FEU Lady Tamaraws)
- Best Defender: Jonela Albiño (FEU Lady Tamaraws)
- Best Goalkeeper: Yasmin Elauria (FEU Lady Tamaraws)
- Fair Play Award: FEU Lady Tamaraws

=== Boys' tournament ===
==== Elimination round ====
Pos	Team	Pld	W	D	L	GF	GA	GD	Pts	Qualification
1	FEU–D Baby Tamaraws (H)	10	9	1	0	22	0	+22	28	Qualification for semifinals
2	UST Tiger Cubs	10	7	1	2	13	0	+13	22	Qualification for semifinals
3	Zobel Junior Archers	10	4	1	5	0	0	0	13	Qualification for semifinals
4	Southridge Admirals (G)	10	3	2	5	0	1	−1	11	Qualification for semifinals
5	Ateneo Blue Eagles	10	3	1	6	0	6	−6	10	
6	Claret Red Roosters (G)	10	1	0	9	0	28	−28	3	

First match(es) will be played: January 18, 2025. Source:
(G) Guests; (H) Hosts

==== Playoffs ====
Semifinals (Knockout)
Mar 22
1	FEU	1
4	Southridge	0
Mar 22
2	UST	2
3	La Salle	1

Finals (Knockout)
Mar 29
1	FEU	1
2	UST	2

==== Awards ====
- Most Valuable Player: Stephen Flores (UST Tiger Cubs)
- Rookie of the Year: Jerriemy Biton (FEU–D Baby Tamaraws)
- Golden Boot: Jerriemy Biton (FEU–D Baby Tamaraws)
- Best Striker: Jerriemy Biton (FEU–D Baby Tamaraws)
- Best Midfielder: Joshua Moleje (UST Tiger Cubs)
- Best Defender: Bacchus Ekberg (Zobel Junior Archers)
- Best Goalkeeper: Paolo Tansingco (Southridge Admirals)
- Fair Play Award: FEU–D Baby Tamaraws

== Badminton ==
The UAAP badminton championships began on October 12, 2024. The tournament venue is the Rizal Memorial Badminton Hall in Manila.

=== Men's tournament ===
==== Elimination round ====
===== Team standings =====
Pos	Team	Pld	W	L	PCT	GB	Qualification
1	NU Bulldogs (H)	5	5	0	1.000	—	Advance to the semifinals
2	Ateneo Blue Eagles	5	4	1	.800	1	Advance to the semifinals
3	UP Fighting Maroons	5	3	2	.600	2	Advance to the semifinals
4	UST Tiger Shuttlers	5	2	3	.400	3	Advance to the semifinals
5	De La Salle Green Shuttlers	5	1	4	.200	4	
6	Adamson Soaring Falcons	5	0	5	.000	5	

Rules for classification: 1) winning percentage; 2) if tied for #2 or #4, one-game playoff; 3) head-to-head record; 4) head-to-head point differential; 5) overall point differential
(H) Hosts

===== Match-up results =====
Team ╲ Game	1	2	3	4	5
Adamson	Ateneo school colors	UST school colors	NU school colors	La Salle school colors	UP school colors
Ateneo	Adamson school colors	La Salle school colors	UST school colors	UP school colors	NU school colors
La Salle	NU school colors	Ateneo school colors	UP school colors	Adamson school colors	UST school colors
NU	La Salle school colors	UP school colors	Adamson school colors	UST school colors	Ateneo school colors
UP	UST school colors	NU school colors	La Salle school colors	Ateneo school colors	Adamson school colors
UST	UP school colors	Adamson school colors	Ateneo school colors	NU school colors	La Salle school colors

= Win; = Loss

===== Scores =====
Teams	AdU	ATENEO	DLSU	NU	UP	UST
Adamson Soaring Falcons	—	0–5	1–4	0–5	1–4	1–4
Ateneo Blue Eagles		—	5–0	1–4	3–2	5–0
De La Salle Green Shuttlers			—	0–5	2–3	2–3
NU Bulldogs				—	3–2	5–0
UP Fighting Maroons					—	5–0
UST Tiger Shuttlers						—

Legend: Blue = left column team win; Red = top row team win.

==== Playoffs ====
Semifinals
October 29
1	NU	3
4	UST	0
October 29
2	Ateneo	3
3	UP	1

Finals
October 30
1	NU	3
2	Ateneo	0
Third place
October 30
4	UST	0
3	UP	3

==== Awards ====
- Most Valuable Player: Lanz Ralf Zafra (NU Bulldogs)
- Rookie of the Year: Shan Clar (UP Fighting Maroons)

=== Women's tournament ===
==== Elimination round ====
===== Team standings =====
Pos	Team	Pld	W	L	PCT	GB	Qualification
1	UP Fighting Maroons	5	5	0	1.000	—	Advance to the semifinals
2	NU Lady Bulldogs (H)	5	4	1	.800	1	Advance to the semifinals
3	Ateneo Blue Eagles	5	3	2	.600	2	Advance to the semifinals
4	UST Lady Shuttlers	5	2	3	.400	3	Advance to the semifinals
5	De La Salle Lady Shuttlers	5	1	4	.200	4	
6	Adamson Lady Falcons	5	0	5	.000	5	

Rules for classification: 1) winning percentage; 2) if tied for #2 or #4, one-game playoff; 3) head-to-head record; 4) head-to-head point differential; 5) overall point differential
(H) Hosts

===== Match-up results =====
Team ╲ Game	1	2	3	4	5
Adamson	Ateneo school colors	UST school colors	UP school colors	La Salle school colors	NU school colors
Ateneo	Adamson school colors	La Salle school colors	UST school colors	NU school colors	UP school colors
La Salle	UP school colors	Ateneo school colors	NU school colors	Adamson school colors	UST school colors
NU	UST school colors	UP school colors	La Salle school colors	Ateneo school colors	Adamson school colors
UP	La Salle school colors	NU school colors	Adamson school colors	UST school colors	Ateneo school colors
UST	NU school colors	Adamson school colors	Ateneo school colors	UP school colors	La Salle school colors

= Win; = Loss

===== Scores =====
Teams	AdU	ATENEO	DLSU	NU	UP	UST
Adamson Lady Falcons	—	1–4	0–5	1–4	1–4	1–4
Ateneo Blue Eagles		—	5–0	2–3	1–4	4–1
De La Salle Lady Shuttlers			—	1–4	1–4	1–4
NU Lady Bulldogs				—	2–3	4–1
UP Fighting Maroons					—	3–2
UST Lady Shuttlers						—

Legend: Blue = left column team win; Red = top row team win.

==== Playoffs ====
Semifinals
October 29
1	UP	3
4	UST	0
October 29
2	NU	2
3	Ateneo	3

Finals
October 30
1	UP	3
3	Ateneo	1
Third place
October 30
4	UST	0
2	NU	3

==== Awards ====
- Most Valuable Player: Anthea Marie Gonzalez (UP Fighting Maroons)
- Rookie of the Year: Althea Dawn Ocampo (Ateneo Blue Eagles)

== Chess ==
The UAAP chess championships began on October 12, 2024. The tournament venue is the Adamson University SV Gym in Manila.

=== Standard ===
==== Men's tournament ====
===== Team standings =====
Pos	Team	Pts	MP
1	UST Male Woodpushers	17.0	31.5
2	UP Fighting Maroons	13.0	23.5
3	FEU Tamaraws	13.0	23.5
4	De La Salle Green Woodpushers	11.0	20.0
5	Ateneo Blue Eagles	6.0	15.5
6	Adamson Soaring Falcons (H)	1.0	6.5

Source: The UAAP
(H) Host

==== Women's tournament ====
===== Team standings =====
Pos	Team	Pts	MP
1	FEU Lady Tamaraws	22.0	37.5
2	De La Salle Lady Woodpushers	16.0	28.5
3	NU Lady Bulldogs	16.0	26.0
4	Ateneo Blue Eagles	12.0	26.0
5	UP Fighting Maroons	9.0	21.0
6	UST Female Woodpushers	7.0	18.0
7	Adamson Lady Falcons (H)	2.0	11.0

Source: The UAAP
(H) Host

=== Rapid ===
==== Men's tournament ====
===== Playoffs =====
Semifinals
1	FEU	W
4	UP	L
2	La Salle	L
3	UST	W

Finals
1	FEU	L
3	UST	W
Third place
4	UP	W
2	La Salle	L

==== Women's tournament ====
===== Playoffs =====
Semifinals
1	Ateneo	3
4	UST	1
2	La Salle	L
3	FEU	W

Finals
1	Ateneo	0.5
3	FEU	3.5
Third place
4	UST	1
2	La Salle	3

=== Blitz ===
==== Men's tournament ====
===== Playoffs =====
Semifinals
1	UST	W
4	UP	L
2	FEU	W
3	La Salle	L

Finals
1	UST	0
2	FEU	4
Third place
4	UP	1
3	La Salle	3

==== Women's tournament ====
===== Playoffs =====
Semifinals
1	La Salle	1.5
4	Ateneo	2.5
2	FEU	W
3	UST	L

Finals
4	Ateneo	2*
2	FEU	2
Third place
1	La Salle	2.5
3	UST	1.5

== Beach volleyball ==
The UAAP beach volleyball championships were held on November 15–26, 2024. The Sands at SM by the Bay in Pasay was the venue of the tournament.

=== Men's tournament ===
==== Elimination round ====
===== Team standings =====
Pos	Team	Pld	W	L	Pts	SW	SL	SR	SPW	SPL	SPR	Qualification
1	UST Tiger Sands	7	7	0	14	14	0	MAX	294	165	1.782	Twice-to-beat in the semifinals
2	NU Bulldogs (H)	7	6	1	13	12	2	6.000	277	201	1.378	Twice-to-beat in the semifinals
3	FEU Tamaraws	7	5	2	12	10	4	2.500	266	240	1.108	Twice-to-win in the semifinals
4	UP Fighting Maroons	7	4	3	11	8	8	1.000	280	275	1.018	Twice-to-win in the semifinals
5	Adamson Soaring Falcons	7	3	4	10	6	8	0.750	251	267	0.940	
6	De La Salle Green Spikers	7	2	5	9	5	12	0.417	258	308	0.838	
7	Ateneo Blue Eagles	7	1	6	8	3	12	0.250	240	281	0.854	
8	UE Red Warriors	7	0	7	7	1	14	0.071	179	308	0.581	

Rules for classification: 1) winning percentage; 2) if tied for #2 or #4, one-game playoff; 3) head-to-head record; 4) match points; 5) sets ratio; 6) points ratio
(H) Host

=== Playoffs ===
Semifinals (Nos. 1 & 2 have twice-to-beat advantage)
1	UST	2
4	UP	0
2	NU	2
3	FEU	0

Finals (Knockout)
1	UST	2
2	NU	0
3rd place (Knockout)
3	FEU	2
4	UP	0

==== Match results ====
All times are Philippine Standard Time (UTC+08:00).

Semifinals: UST vs. UP (UST has a twice-to-beat advantage)
Date	Time	Team 1	Score	Team 2	Set 1	Set 2	Set 3
Feb 2	08:00	UST Tiger Sands	2–0	UP Fighting Maroons	21–15	21–12	—

Semifinals: NU vs. FEU (NU has a twice-to-beat advantage)
Date	Time	Team 1	Score	Team 2	Set 1	Set 2	Set 3
Feb 2	08:45	NU Bulldogs	2–0	FEU Tamaraws	22–20	21–16	—

Third Place Match
Date	Time	Team 1	Score	Team 2	Set 1	Set 2	Set 3
Feb 2	14:00	FEU Tamaraws	2–0	UP Fighting Maroons	21–19	21–13	—

Championship Match
Date	Time	Team 1	Score	Team 2	Set 1	Set 2	Set 3
Feb 2	15:30	UST Tiger Sands	2–0	NU Bulldogs	21–13	21–16	—

==== Awards ====
- Most Valuable Player: Dominique Gabito (UST Tiger Sands)
- Rookie of the Year: Rain Gemarino (NU Bulldogs)

=== Women's tournament ===
==== Elimination round ====
===== Team standings =====
Pos	Team	Pld	W	L	Pts	SW	SL	SR	SPW	SPL	SPR	Qualification
1	UST Tiger Sands	7	7	0	14	14	0	MAX	294	165	1.782	Twice-to-beat in the semifinals
2	NU Lady Bulldogs (H)	7	6	1	13	12	2	6.000	279	209	1.335	Twice-to-beat in the semifinals
3	Adamson Lady Falcons	7	5	2	12	10	6	1.667	289	259	1.116	Twice-to-win in the semifinals
4	FEU Lady Tamaraws	7	4	3	11	8	6	1.333	261	299	0.873	Twice-to-win in the semifinals
5	UP Fighting Maroons	7	2 (Note: Set point ratio: UP (.873), Ateneo (.844))	5	9	6	10	0.600	261	299	0.873	
6	Ateneo Blue Eagles	7	2	5	9	5	11	0.455	254	301	0.844	
7	De La Salle Lady Spikers	7	1 (Note: Set point ratio: DLSU (.741), UE (.705))	6	8	2	12	0.167	206	278	0.741	
8	UE Lady Warriors	7	1	6	8	3	13	0.231	222	315	0.705	

Rules for classification: 1) winning percentage; 2) if tied for #2 or #4, one-game playoff; 3) head-to-head record; 4) match points; 5) sets ratio; 6) points ratio
(H) Host

=== Playoffs ===
Semifinals (Nos. 1 & 2 have twice-to-beat advantage)
1	UST	2
4	FEU	0
2	NU	2
3	Adamson	0

Finals (Knockout)
1	UST	1
2	NU	2
3rd place (Knockout)
3	Adamson	0
4	FEU	2

==== Match results ====
All times are Philippine Standard Time (UTC+08:00).

Semifinals: UST vs. FEU (UST has a twice-to-beat advantage)
Date	Time	Team 1	Score	Team 2	Set 1	Set 2	Set 3
Feb 2	09:30	UST Tiger Sands	2–0	FEU Lady Tamaraws	21–15	21–15	—

Semifinals: NU vs. Adamson (NU has a twice-to-beat advantage)
Date	Time	Team 1	Score	Team 2	Set 1	Set 2	Set 3
Feb 2	10:15	NU Lady Bulldogs	2–0	Adamson Lady Falcons	21–12	21–10	—

Third Place Match
Date	Time	Team 1	Score	Team 2	Set 1	Set 2	Set 3
Feb 2	14:45	Adamson Lady Falcons	0–2	FEU Lady Tamaraws	15–21	10–21	—

Championship Match
Date	Time	Team 1	Score	Team 2	Set 1	Set 2	Set 3
Feb 2	14:45	UST Tiger Sands	1–2	NU Lady Bulldogs	16–21	21–19	11–15

==== Awards ====
- Most Valuable Player: Honey Grace Cordero (NU Lady Bulldogs)
- Rookie of the Year: Khylem Progella (UST Tiger Sands)

=== Boys' tournament ===
==== Elimination round ====
===== Team standings =====
Pos	Team	Pld	W	L	Pts	SW	SL	SR	SPW	SPL	SPR	Qualification
1	UST Junior Tiger Sands	7	7	0	14	14	0	MAX	247	194	1.273	Twice-to-beat in the semifinals
2	NUNS Bullpups (H)	7	6	1	13	12	2	6.000	282	163	1.730	Twice-to-beat in the semifinals
3	Adamson Baby Falcons	7	5	2	12	10	5	2.000	246	258	0.953	Twice-to-win in the semifinals
4	FEU–D Baby Tamaraws	7	4	3	11	9	8	1.125	277	195	1.421	Twice-to-win in the semifinals
5	DLSZ Junior Green Spikers	7	3	4	10	6	9	0.667	227	262	0.866	
6	UPIS Junior Fighting Maroons	7	2	5	9	4	11	0.364	220	259	0.849	
7	UE Junior Red Warriors	7	1	6	8	4	12	0.333	243	312	0.779	
8	Ateneo Blue Eagles	7	0	7	7	2	14	0.143	170	269	0.632	

Rules for classification: 1) winning percentage; 2) if tied for #2 or #4, one-game playoff; 3) head-to-head record; 4) match points; 5) sets ratio; 6) points ratio
(H) Host

=== Playoffs ===
Semifinals (Nos. 1 & 2 have twice-to-beat advantage)
1	UST	2
4	FEU–D	0
2	NUNS	2
3	Adamson	0

Finals (Knockout)
1	UST	2
2	NU	1
3rd place (Knockout)
3	Adamson	1
4	FEU–D	2

==== Match results ====
All times are Philippine Standard Time (UTC+08:00).

Semifinals: UST vs. FEU–D (UST has a twice-to-beat advantage)
Date	Time	Team 1	Score	Team 2	Set 1	Set 2	Set 3
Feb 2	07:00	UST Junior Tiger Sands	2–0	FEU–D Baby Tamaraws	21–7	21–12	—

Semifinals: NUNS vs. Adamson (NUNS has a twice-to-beat advantage)
Date	Time	Team 1	Score	Team 2	Set 1	Set 2	Set 3
Feb 2	07:40	NUNS Bullpups	2–0	Adamson Baby Falcons	21–12	21–16	—

Third Place Match
Date	Time	Team 1	Score	Team 2	Set 1	Set 2	Set 3
Feb 2	14:00	Adamson Baby Falcons	1–2	FEU–D Baby Tamaraws	20–22	21–19	15–13

Championship Match
Date	Time	Team 1	Score	Team 2	Set 1	Set 2	Set 3
Feb 2	15:40	UST Tiger Sands	2–1	NUNS Bullpups	21–14	13–21	16–14

==== Awards ====
- Most Valuable Player: John Lagaran (UST Tiger Sands)
- Rookie of the Year: Luis Papa (DLSZ Junior Green Spikers)

=== Girls' tournament ===
==== Elimination round ====
===== Team standings =====
Pos	Team	Pld	W	L	Pts	SW	SL	SR	SPW	SPL	SPR	Qualification
1	NUNS Lady Bullpups (H)	5	5	0	10	10	0	MAX	198	136	1.456	Twice-to-beat in the semifinals
2	UST Junior Tiger Sands	5	4	1	9	8	2	4.000	203	143	1.420	Twice-to-beat in the semifinals
3	FEU–D Lady Baby Tamaraws	5	3	2	8	6	4	1.500	157	182	0.863	Twice-to-win in the semifinals
4	Adamson Lady Baby Falcons	5	2	3	7	4	6	0.667	179	171	1.047	Twice-to-win in the semifinals
5	UPIS Junior Fighting Maroons	5	1	4	6	2	8	0.250	167	161	1.037	
6	DLSZ Junior Lady Spikers	5	0	5	5	0	10	0.000	99	210	0.471	

Rules for classification: 1) winning percentage; 2) if tied for #2 or #4, one-game playoff; 3) head-to-head record; 4) match points; 5) sets ratio; 6) points ratio
(H) Host

=== Playoffs ===
Semifinals (Nos. 1 & 2 have twice-to-beat advantage)
1	NUNS	2
4	Adamson	0
2	UST	2
3	FEU–D	1

Finals (Knockout)
1	NUNS	2
2	UST	1
3rd place (Knockout)
3	FEU–D	0
4	Adamson	2

==== Match results ====
All times are Philippine Standard Time (UTC+08:00).

Semifinals: NUNS vs. Adamson (NUNS has a twice-to-beat advantage)
Date	Time	Team 1	Score	Team 2	Set 1	Set 2	Set 3
Feb 2	08:30	NUNS Lady Bullpups	2–0	Adamson Lady Baby Falcons	21–9	21–16	—

Semifinals: UST vs. FEU–D (UST has a twice-to-beat advantage)
Date	Time	Team 1	Score	Team 2	Set 1	Set 2	Set 3
Feb 2	09:15	UST Junior Tiger Sands	2–1	FEU–D Lady Baby Tamaraws	21–17	16–21	15–6

Third Place Match
Date	Time	Team 1	Score	Team 2	Set 1	Set 2	Set 3
Feb 2	14:45	FEU–D Lady Baby Tamaraws	0–2	Adamson Lady Baby Falcons	17–21	12–21	—

Championship Match
Date	Time	Team 1	Score	Team 2	Set 1	Set 2	Set 3
Feb 2	16:15	NUNS Lady Bullpups	2–1	UST Junior Tiger Sands	18–21	21–10	15–8

==== Awards ====
- Most Valuable Player: Vilmarie Toos (NUNS Lady Bullpups)
- Rookie of the Year: Ellaine Gonzalvo (Adamson Lady Baby Falcons)

== Athletics ==
Pos.	Pts.
1st	15
2nd	12
3rd	10
4th	8
5th	6
6th	4
7th	2
8th	1

The UAAP athletics championships were held from November 17–21, 2024 at the New Clark City Athletics Stadium in Capas, Tarlac.

Ranking is determined by a point system, similar to that of the overall championship. The points given are based on the athlete's/team's finish in the finals of an event, which include only the top eight finishers from the preliminaries. The gold medalist(s) receive 15 points, silver gets 12, bronze has 10. The following points: 8, 6, 4, 2 and 1 are given to the rest of the participating athletes/teams according to their order of finish.

=== Men's tournament ===
==== Team standings ====
Rank	Team	Medals				Points
Rank	Team	1st place, gold medalist(s)	2nd place, silver medalist(s)	3rd place, bronze medalist(s)	Total	Points
1st place, gold medalist(s)	UP Fighting Maroons	4	7	5	16	290
2nd place, silver medalist(s)	FEU Tamaraws	5	3	6	14	286
3rd place, bronze medalist(s)	UST Tiger Tracksters	6	5	4	15	236
4	UE Red Warriors	4	2	3	9	167
5	NU Bulldogs	2	3	2	7	155.5
6	Adamson Soaring Falcons	0	3	4	7	129
7	Ateneo Blue Eagles (H)	2	0	0	2	52
8	De La Salle Green Tracksters	0	0	0	0	39

==== Awards ====
- Most Valuable Player: Alfrence Braza (FEU Tamaraws)
- Rookie of the Year: Hassan Loraña (Ateneo Blue Eagles)

=== Women's tournament ===
==== Team standings ====
Rank	Team	Medals				Points
Rank	Team	1st place, gold medalist(s)	2nd place, silver medalist(s)	3rd place, bronze medalist(s)	Total	Points
1st place, gold medalist(s)	FEU Lady Tamaraws	5	8	8	21	397.5
2nd place, silver medalist(s)	UST Lady Tracksters	8	4	3	15	291.5
3rd place, bronze medalist(s)	UP Fighting Maroons	3	4	4	11	195
4	De La Salle Lady Tracksters	4	4	3	11	191
5	NU Lady Bulldogs	1	3	2	6	115
6	UE Lady Warriors	1	1	0	2	84.5
7	Adamson Lady Falcons	1	0	2	3	73
8	Ateneo Blue Eagles (H)	0	0	0	0	1

===== Awards =====
- Most Valuable Player: Bernalyn Bejoy (De La Salle Lady Tracksters)
- Rookie of the Year: Shaine Joy Ponse (FEU Lady Tamaraws)

=== Boys' tournament ===
==== Team standings ====
Rank	Team	Medals				Points
Rank	Team	1st place, gold medalist(s)	2nd place, silver medalist(s)	3rd place, bronze medalist(s)	Total	Points
1st place, gold medalist(s)	UST Junior Tiger Tracksters	7	7	5	19	404
2nd place, silver medalist(s)	Adamson Baby Falcons	6	6	5	17	326
3rd place, bronze medalist(s)	UE Junior Red Warriors	4	4	6	14	324
4	NUNS Bullpups	5	1	3	9	126.5
5	DLSZ Junior Green Tracksters	0	3	0	3	52
6	Ateneo Blue Eagles (H)	0	0	1	1	41

==== Awards ====
- Most Valuable Player: Kharis Pantonial (NUNS Bullpups)
- Rookie of the Year: Ivan Cabanda (UST Junior Tiger Tracksters)

=== Girls' tournament ===
==== Team standings ====
Rank	Team	Medals				Points
Rank	Team	1st place, gold medalist(s)	2nd place, silver medalist(s)	3rd place, bronze medalist(s)	Total	Points
1st place, gold medalist(s)	UE Junior Lady Warriors	11	5	6	22	441.5
2nd place, silver medalist(s)	UST Junior Lady Tracksters	6	9	10	25	425.5
3rd place, bronze medalist(s)	Adamson Lady Baby Falcons	4	6	6	16	293
4	NUNS Lady Bullpups	0	2	1	3	78.5
5	Ateneo Blue Eagles (H)	0	0	0	0	22
6	DLSZ Junior Lady Tracksters	0	0	0	0	14

==== Awards ====
- Most Valuable Player: Jeralyn Rodriguez (UE Junior Lady Warriors)
- Rookie of the Year: Erika Joy Dorado (Adamson Lady Baby Falcons)

== Swimming ==
Pos.	Pts.
1st	15
2nd	12
3rd	10
4th	8
5th	6
6th	4
7th	2
8th	1

The UAAP swimming championships were held from November 17–20, 2024 at the New Clark City Aquatic Center in Capas, Tarlac.

Ranking is determined by a point system, similar to that of the overall championship. The points given are based on the swimmer's/team's finish in the finals of an event, which include only the top eight finishers from the preliminaries. The gold medalist(s) receive 15 points, silver gets 12, bronze has 10. The following points: 8, 6, 4, 2 and 1 are given to the rest of the participating swimmers/teams according to their order of finish.

=== Men's tournament ===
==== Team standings ====
Rank	Team	Medals				Points
Rank	Team	1st place, gold medalist(s)	2nd place, silver medalist(s)	3rd place, bronze medalist(s)	Total	Points
1st place, gold medalist(s)	Ateneo Blue Eagles (H)	19	6	5	30	493
2nd place, silver medalist(s)	De La Salle Green Tankers	1	13	4	18	321
3rd place, bronze medalist(s)	UP Fighting Maroons	1	0	7	8	226
4	UST Male Tigersharks	1	3	6	10	170

==== Awards ====
- Most Valuable Player: Miguel Barreto (Ateneo Blue Eagles)
- Rookie of the Year: Miguel Barreto (Ateneo Blue Eagles)

=== Women's tournament ===
==== Team standings ====
Rank	Team	Medals				Points
Rank	Team	1st place, gold medalist(s)	2nd place, silver medalist(s)	3rd place, bronze medalist(s)	Total	Points
1st place, gold medalist(s)	Ateneo Blue Eagles (H)	7	8	6	21	349
2nd place, silver medalist(s)	UP Fighting Maroons	7	4	5	16	382
3rd place, bronze medalist(s)	De La Salle Lady Tankers	4	4	4	12	240
4	UST Female Tigersharks	3	5	6	14	112

===== Awards =====
- Most Valuable Player: Mishka Sy (Ateneo Blue Eagles)
- Rookie of the Year: Mikaela Talosig (De La Salle Lady Tankers)

=== Boys' tournament ===
==== Team standings ====
Rank	Team	Medals				Points
Rank	Team	1st place, gold medalist(s)	2nd place, silver medalist(s)	3rd place, bronze medalist(s)	Total	Points
1st place, gold medalist(s)	UST Junior Male Tigersharks	20	15	8	43	738
2nd place, silver medalist(s)	Ateneo Blue Eagles (H)	2	6	5	13	255
3rd place, bronze medalist(s)	DLSZ Junior Green Tankers	0	1	4	5	107
4	UPIS Junior Fighting Maroons	0	0	5	5	95

==== Awards ====
- Most Valuable Player: Aishel Evangelista (UST Junior Male Tigersharks)
- Rookie of the Year: Niño Pugay (DLSZ Junior Green Tankers)

=== Girls' tournament ===
==== Team standings ====
Rank	Team	Medals				Points
Rank	Team	1st place, gold medalist(s)	2nd place, silver medalist(s)	3rd place, bronze medalist(s)	Total	Points
1st place, gold medalist(s)	UST Junior Female Tigersharks	15	6	11	32	567
2nd place, silver medalist(s)	Ateneo Blue Eagles (H)	4	7	4	15	268
3rd place, bronze medalist(s)	UPIS Junior Fighting Maroons	2	4	3	9	180
4	DLSZ Junior Lady Tankers	0	4	2	6	112

==== Awards ====
- Most Valuable Player: Pam Santor (UST Junior Female Tigersharks)
- Rookie of the Year: Liv Florendo (UPIS Junior Fighting Maroons)

== Table tennis ==
The UAAP table tennis championships began on November 19, 2024. The tournament venue is the Homecourt at Ayala Malls Manila Bay in Parañaque City.

=== Men's tournament ===
==== Elimination round ====
Pos	Team	Pld	W	L	Qualification
1	UST Tiger Paddlers	12	12	0	Advance to the Finals (Note: As UST won all of their elimination round games, the stepladder format was used instead of the regular Final Four format.)
2	Ateneo Blue Eagles	12	8 (Note: Second seed playoff: Ateneo 3–1 DLSU)	4	Advance to stepladder round 2
3	De La Salle Green Paddlers (H)	12	8	4	Proceed to stepladder round 1
4	Adamson Soaring Falcons	12	7	5	Proceed to stepladder round 1
5	UP Fighting Maroons	12	5	7	
6	FEU Tamaraw Paddlers	12	2	10	
7	UE Red Warriors	12	0	12	

Rules for classification: 1) winning percentage; 2) if tied for #2 or #4, one-game playoff; 3) head-to-head record; 4) head-to-head point differential; 5) overall point differential
(H) Hosts

==== Playoffs ====
Stepladder round 1 (Knockout)
November 25
3	La Salle	2
4	Adamson	3

Stepladder round 2 (Knockout)
November 25
2	Ateneo	3
4	Adamson	1

Finals (Best-of-three series)
November 26
1	UST	3	3
2	Ateneo	1	1

==== Awards ====
- Most Valuable Player: Eljay Tormis (UST Tiger Paddlers)
- Rookie of the Year: Ray Joshua Manlapaz (UST Tiger Paddlers)

=== Women's tournament ===
==== Elimination round ====
Pos	Team	Pld	W	L	Qualification
1	UST Lady Paddlers	12	12	0	Advance to the Finals (Note: As UST won all of their elimination round games, the stepladder format was used instead of the regular Final Four format.)
2	FEU Lady Paddlers	12	9	3	Advance to stepladder round 2
3	De La Salle Lady Paddlers (H)	12	7	5	Proceed to stepladder round 1
4	Ateneo Blue Eagles	12	6	6	Proceed to stepladder round 1
5	UE Lady Warriors	12	3	9	
6	UP Fighting Maroons	12	3	9	
7	Adamson Lady Falcons	12	2	10	

Rules for classification: 1) winning percentage; 2) if tied for #2 or #4, one-game playoff; 3) head-to-head record; 4) head-to-head point differential; 5) overall point differential
(H) Hosts

==== Playoffs ====
Stepladder round 1 (Knockout)
November 25
3	La Salle	2
4	Ateneo	3

Stepladder round 2 (Knockout)
November 25
2	FEU	3
4	Ateneo	1

Finals (Best-of-three series)
November 26
1	UST	3	3
2	FEU	2	0

==== Awards ====
- Most Valuable Player: Althea Gudes (UST Lady Paddlers)
- Rookie of the Year: Althea Gudes (UST Lady Paddlers)

== Taekwondo ==
The UAAP taekwondo championships began on November 19, 2024 at the Ninoy Aquino Stadium in Manila. The kyorugi tournaments follow a single round-robin format with the top three teams at the end of their games being declared the medalists while the poomsae tournament follows a medal count.

=== Men's kyorugi tournament ===
Pos	Team	Pld	W	L	PCT	GB
1	De La Salle Green Jins	5	5	0	1.000	—
2	NU Bulldogs	5	4	1	.800	1
3	UST Tiger Jins	5	3	2	.600	2
4	UP Fighting Maroons	5	2	3	.400	3
5	FEU Tamaraws (H)	5	1	4	.200	4
6	Ateneo Blue Eagles	5	0	5	.000	5

Rules for classification: 1) winning percentage; 2) head-to-head record; 3) head-to-head point differential; 4) overall point differential
(H) Hosts

=== Women's kyorugi tournament ===
Pos	Team	Pld	W	L	PCT	GB
1	NU Lady Bulldogs	5	5	0	1.000	—
2	UST Lady Jins	5	4	1	.800	1
3	De La Salle Lady Jins	5	3	2	.600	2
4	Ateneo Blue Eagles	5	2	3	.400	3
5	FEU Lady Tamaraws (H)	5	1	4	.200	4
6	UP Lady Maroons	5	0	5	.000	5

Rules for classification: 1) winning percentage; 2) head-to-head record; 3) head-to-head point differential; 4) overall point differential
(H) Hosts

=== Boys' kyorugi tournament ===
Pos	Team	Pld	W	L	PCT	GB
1	NUNS Bullpups	4	4	0	1.000	—
2	UST Junior Tiger Jins	4	3	1	.750	1
3	FEU–D Baby Tamaraws (H)	4	2	2	.500	2
4	De La Salle Junior Green Jins	4	1	3	.250	3
5	Ateneo Blue Eagles	4	0	4	.000	4

Rules for classification: 1) winning percentage; 2) head-to-head record; 3) head-to-head point differential; 4) overall point differential
(H) Hosts

=== Poomsae tournament ===
Rank	Team	Medals			
Rank	Team	1st place, gold medalist(s)	2nd place, silver medalist(s)	3rd place, bronze medalist(s)	Total
1st place, gold medalist(s)	UST	3	2	0	5
2nd place, silver medalist(s)	NU	2	3	0	5
3rd place, bronze medalist(s)	La Salle	0	0	4	4
4	UP	0	0	1	1
5	Ateneo	0	0	0	0
6	FEU (H)	0	0	0	0

== Judo ==
Pos.	Pts.
1st	7
2nd	3
3rd	1

The UAAP judo tournaments were held from December 14–15, 2024 at the Ninoy Aquino Stadium in Manila.

=== Men's tournament ===
==== Team standings ====
Rank	Team	Medals				Points
Rank	Team	1st place, gold medalist(s)	2nd place, silver medalist(s)	3rd place, bronze medalist(s)	Total	Points
1st place, gold medalist(s)	UST Tiger Judokas	4	5	4	13	47
2nd place, silver medalist(s)	UP Fighting Maroons	3	2	7	12	34
3rd place, bronze medalist(s)	De La Salle Green Judokas	1	1	1	3	11
4	Ateneo Blue Eagles	0	0	4	4	4
5	Adamson Soaring Falcons	0	0	0	0	0

=== Women's tournament ===
==== Team standings ====
Rank	Team	Medals				Points
Rank	Team	1st place, gold medalist(s)	2nd place, silver medalist(s)	3rd place, bronze medalist(s)	Total	Points
1st place, gold medalist(s)	UE Lady Warriors	4	3	3	10	40
2nd place, silver medalist(s)	UST Lady Judokas	1	1	9	11	19
3rd place, bronze medalist(s)	De La Salle Lady Judokas	1	2	1	4	14
4	Ateneo Blue Eagles	1	1	2	4	12
5	UP Fighting Maroons	1	1	1	3	11
6	Adamson Lady Falcons	0	0	0	0	0

=== Boys' tournament ===
==== Team standings ====
Rank	Team	Medals				Points
Rank	Team	1st place, gold medalist(s)	2nd place, silver medalist(s)	3rd place, bronze medalist(s)	Total	Points
1st place, gold medalist(s)	UE Junior Red Warriors	4	2	2	8	36
2nd place, silver medalist(s)	UST Junior Tiger Judokas	3	3	6	12	36
3rd place, bronze medalist(s)	Ateneo Blue Eagles	1	1	2	4	12
4	DLSZ Junior Green Judokas	0	2	4	6	10

=== Girls' tournament ===
==== Team standings ====
Rank	Team	Medals				Points
Rank	Team	1st place, gold medalist(s)	2nd place, silver medalist(s)	3rd place, bronze medalist(s)	Total	Points
1st place, gold medalist(s)	UE Junior Lady Warriors	5	3	1	9	45
2nd place, silver medalist(s)	UST Junior Lady Judokas	2	4	5	11	31
3rd place, bronze medalist(s)	DLSZ Junior Lady Judokas	1	1	0	2	10

== Tennis ==
The UAAP Season 87 Tennis tournament began on February 22, 2025. The tournament venue is the Felicisimo Ampon Tennis Court at the Rizal Memorial Sports Complex. For the first time, both tournaments' finals series were televised and broadcast via Pilipinas Live.

=== Men's tournament ===
==== Elimination round ====
Pos	Team	Pld	W	L	Qualification
1	UST Male Tennisters	12	11	1	Twice-to-beat in the semifinals
2	NU Bulldogs	12	10	2	Twice-to-beat in the semifinals
3	UP Fighting Maroons	12	8	4	Twice-to-win in the semifinals
4	UE Red Warriors	12	7	5	Twice-to-win in the semifinals
5	Ateneo Blue Eagles	12	3	9	
6	Adamson Soaring Falcons	12	2	10	
7	De La Salle Green Tennisters	12	1	11	

Rules for classification: 1) number of wins; 2) if tied for #2 or #4, one-tie playoff; 3) head-to-head record; 4) match points; 5) matches ratio; 6) games ratio

===== Match-up results =====
	Round 1						Round 2					
Team ╲ Game	1	2	3	4	5	6	7	8	9	10	11	12
Adamson	Ateneo school colors	NU school colors	La Salle school colors	UST school colors	UE school colors	UP school colors	UE school colors	Ateneo school colors	La Salle school colors	UST school colors	UP school colors	NU school colors
Ateneo	Adamson school colors	NU school colors	La Salle school colors	UST school colors	UE school colors	UP school colors	UP school colors	Adamson school colors	NU school colors	UE school colors	La Salle school colors	UST school colors
La Salle	UE school colors	UP school colors	Adamson school colors	Ateneo school colors	NU school colors	UST school colors	UST school colors	UP school colors	Adamson school colors	NU school colors	UE school colors	Ateneo school colors
NU	UP school colors	Adamson school colors	Ateneo school colors	La Salle school colors	UE school colors	UST school colors	UE school colors	Ateneo school colors	La Salle school colors	UST school colors	UP school colors	Adamson school colors
UE	La Salle school colors	UST school colors	UP school colors	Adamson school colors	Ateneo school colors	NU school colors	Adamson school colors	NU school colors	Ateneo school colors	La Salle school colors	UST school colors	UP school colors
UP	NU school colors	La Salle school colors	UST school colors	UE school colors	Adamson school colors	Ateneo school colors	Ateneo school colors	La Salle school colors	UST school colors	Adamson school colors	NU school colors	UE school colors
UST	UE school colors	UP school colors	Adamson school colors	Ateneo school colors	La Salle school colors	NU school colors	La Salle school colors	UP school colors	Adamson school colors	NU school colors	UE school colors	Ateneo school colors

= Win; = Loss

===== Scores =====
Teams	AdU	ATENEO	DLSU	NU	UE	UP	UST
Adamson Soaring Falcons	—	2–3	4–1	2–3	0–5	0–5	0–5
Ateneo Blue Eagles	3–2	—	3–2	0–5	2–3	1–4	0–5
De La Salle Green Tennisters	2–3	3–2	—	1–4	1–4	0–5	0–5
NU Bulldogs	4–1	5–0	4–1	—	4–1	2–3	3–2
UE Red Warriors	3–2	3–2	3–2	5–0	—	3–2	1–4
UP Fighting Maroons	4–1	4–1	4–1	1–4	4–1	—	2–3
UST Male Tennisters	5–0	4–1	5–0	4–1	3–2	4–1	—

Legend: Blue = left column team win; Red = top row team win.

==== Playoffs ====
Semifinals (Nos. 1 & 2 have twice-to-beat advantage)
1	UST	4
4	UE	1
2	NU	2	3
3	UP	3	1

Final (Best-of-three series)
1	UST	2	0
2	NU	3	3

=== Women's tournament ===
==== Elimination round ====
Pos	Team	Pld	W	L	Qualification
1	NU Lady Bulldogs	8	7	1	Advance to the Finals
2	UST Female Tennisters	8	7	1	Advance to the Finals
3	UP Fighting Maroons	8	4	4	
4	De La Salle Lady Tennisters	8	2	6	
5	Ateneo Blue Eagles	8	0	8	

Rules for classification: 1) number of wins; 2) if tied for #2 or #4, one-game playoff; 3) head-to-head record; 4) match points; 5) matches ratio; 6) games ratio

===== Match-up results =====
	Round 1				Round 2			
Team ╲ Game	1	2	3	4	5	6	7	8
Ateneo	UP school colors	La Salle school colors	UST school colors	NU school colors	UST school colors	UP school colors	NU school colors	La Salle school colors
La Salle	UST school colors	Ateneo school colors	NU school colors	UP school colors	UP school colors	NU school colors	UST school colors	Ateneo school colors
NU	UP school colors	La Salle school colors	UST school colors	Ateneo school colors	La Salle school colors	UST school colors	Ateneo school colors	UP school colors
UP	Ateneo school colors	NU school colors	La Salle school colors	UST school colors	La Salle school colors	UST school colors	Ateneo school colors	NU school colors
UST	La Salle school colors	Ateneo school colors	NU school colors	UP school colors	Ateneo school colors	UP school colors	NU school colors	La Salle school colors

= Win; = Loss

===== Scores =====
Teams	ATENEO	DLSU	NU	UP	UST
Ateneo Blue Eagles	—	1–4	0–5	1–4	1–4
De La Salle Lady Tennisters	4–1	—	1–4	1–4	1–4
NU Lady Bulldogs	5–0	5–0	—	3–2	3–2
UP Fighting Maroons	4–1	3–2	1–4	—	1–4
UST Female Tennisters	5–0	3–2	3–2	4–1	—

Legend: Blue = left column team win; Red = top row team win.

==== Finals ====
Team 1	Series	Team 2	Tie 1	Tie 2	Tie 3
NU Lady Bulldogs	1–2	UST Female Tennisters	3–1	1–3	0–3

== Baseball ==
The UAAP baseball championships began on February 26 at the Rizal Memorial Baseball Stadium for the first time since UAAP Season 81. For the first time, all elimination round games were televised and broadcast via Pilipinas Live.

=== Men's tournament ===
==== Elimination round ====
Pos	Team	Pld	W	L	RF	RA	RD	PCT	Qualification
1	NU Bulldogs	10	9	1	105	60	+45	.900	Twice-to-beat in the semifinals
2	De La Salle Green Batters	10	6	4	81	68	+13	.600	Twice-to-beat in the semifinals
3	UST Golden Sox	10	5	5	83	81	+2	.500	Twice-to-win in the semifinals
4	Adamson Soaring Falcons (H)	10	4	6	89	93	−4	.400 (Note: Fourth-seed playoff: Adamson 16–15 UP)	Twice-to-win in the semifinals
5	UP Fighting Maroons	10	4	6	89	91	−2	.400	
6	Ateneo Blue Eagles	10	2	8	42	96	−54	.200	

Rules for classification: 1) winning percentage; 2) if tied for #2 or #4, one-game playoff; 3) head-to-head record; 4) head-to-head runs against; 5) overall run differential
(H) Hosts

===== Match-up results =====
	Round 1					Round 2				
Team ╲ Game	1	2	3	4	5	6	7	8	9	10
Adamson	NU school colors	UST school colors	La Salle school colors	UP school colors	Ateneo school colors	NU school colors	La Salle school colors	UST school colors	UP school colors	Ateneo school colors
Ateneo	UST school colors	La Salle school colors	UP school colors	NU school colors	Adamson school colors	UST school colors	UP school colors	La Salle school colors	NU school colors	Adamson school colors
La Salle	UP school colors	Ateneo school colors	Adamson school colors	UST school colors	NU school colors	UP school colors	Adamson school colors	Ateneo school colors	UST school colors	NU school colors
NU	Adamson school colors	UP school colors	UST school colors	Ateneo school colors	La Salle school colors	Adamson school colors	UST school colors	UP school colors	Ateneo school colors	La Salle school colors
UP	La Salle school colors	NU school colors	Ateneo school colors	Adamson school colors	UST school colors	La Salle school colors	Ateneo school colors	NU school colors	Adamson school colors	UST school colors
UST	Ateneo school colors	Adamson school colors	NU school colors	La Salle school colors	UP school colors	Ateneo school colors	NU school colors	Adamson school colors	La Salle school colors	UP school colors

= Win; = Loss

===== Scores =====
Results to the right and top of the gray cells are first round games, those to the left and below are second round games.

Teams	AdU	ATENEO	DLSU	NU	UP	UST
Adamson Soaring Falcons	—	10–0^{7}	6–14	4–7	19–17	11–4
Ateneo Blue Eagles	8–7	—	1–9	6–14	7–5	3–13^{7}
De La Salle Green Batters	14–7	9–5	—	7–11	6–15	8–6
NU Bulldogs	11–3	7–2	9–6	—	9–1	15–14
UP Fighting Maroons	13–12	11–7	4–5	5–12	—	7–2
UST Golden Sox	5–10	11–3	4–3	12–10	12–11	—

Legend: Blue = left column team win; Red = top row team win.

Superscript is the number of innings played before the mercy rule was applied.

==== Playoffs ====
Semifinals (Nos. 1 & 2 have twice-to-beat advantage)
1	NU	11
4	Adamson	5
2	La Salle	6*
3	UST	5

Finals (Best-of-three series)
1	NU	16	9
2	La Salle	7	6

*Game ended after 11 innings
^If necessary

===== Semifinals =====
====== (1) NU vs. (4) Adamson ======
April 29, 2025 12:00 PM at Rizal Memorial Baseball Stadium
Team	1	2	3	4	5	6	7	8	9	R	H	E
AdU Soaring Falcons	0	0	0	2	0	1	0	1	1	5	10	6
NU Bulldogs	2	0	3	0	0	0	6	0	X	11	11	4

====== (2) La Salle vs. (3) UST ======
April 29, 2025 8:00 AM at Rizal Memorial Baseball Stadium
Team	1	2	3	4	5	6	7	8	9	10	11	R	H	E
UST Golden Sox	0	2	0	0	1	0	1	0	1	0	0	5	9	1
DLSU Green Batters	0	0	0	0	2	0	3	0	0	0	1	6	8	2

===== Finals =====
====== Game 1 ======
May 2, 2025 8:00 AM at Rizal Memorial Baseball Stadium
Team	1	2	3	4	5	6	7	8	9	R	H	E
DLSU Green Batters	0	1	0	4	0	2	0	0	0	7	11	3
NU Bulldogs	0	0	5	0	5	0	2	4	X	16	21	3

====== Game 2 ======
May 6, 2025 8:00 AM at Rizal Memorial Baseball Stadium
Team	1	2	3	4	5	6	7	8	9	R	H	E
NU Bulldogs	0	0	0	2	5	0	0	2	0	9	9	4
DLSU Green Batters	2	3	0	0	0	1	0	0	0	6	12	5

==== Awards ====
- Most Valuable Player: John Vargas (UST Golden Sox)
- Finals Most Valuable Player: Nigel Paule (UST Golden Sox)
- Rookie of the Year: Cedrick Marquez (UST Golden Sox)
- Best Pitcher: Jherick Timban (NU Bulldogs)
- Most Stolen Bases: John Kiel Olazo (NU Bulldogs)
- Most RBIs: Joven Kenneth Maulit (NU Bulldogs)
- Most Home Runs: John Vargas (UST Golden Sox)
- Best Slugger: Herald Tenorio (NU Bulldogs)
- Best Hitter: Efril Ian Mercado (UP Fighting Maroons)

== Softball ==
The UAAP softball championships began on February 25 at the Rizal Memorial Baseball Stadium for the first time since UAAP Season 81.

=== Women's tournament ===
==== Elimination round ====
Pos	Team	Pld	W	L	RF	RA	RD	Pts	Qualification
1	Adamson Lady Falcons (H)	8	8	0	71	11	+60	16	Advance to the Finals
2	UP Fighting Maroons	8	6	2	71	24	+47	14	Advance to the Finals
3	UST Tiger Softbelles	8	3	5	48	46	+2	11	Advance to Battle for Third
4	De La Salle Lady Batters	8	3	5	53	54	−1	11	Advance to Battle for Third
5	Ateneo Blue Eagles	8	0	8	8	116	−108	8	

Rules for classification: 1) winning percentage; 2) if tied for #2 or #4, one-game playoff; 3) head-to-head record; 4) head-to-head runs against; 5) overall run differential
(H) Hosts

===== Match-up results =====
	Round 1				Round 2			
Team ╲ Game	1	2	3	4	5	6	7	8
Adamson	UST school colors	Ateneo school colors	UP school colors	La Salle school colors	UST school colors	Ateneo school colors	UP school colors	La Salle school colors
Ateneo	UP school colors	La Salle school colors	Adamson school colors	UST school colors	UP school colors	La Salle school colors	Adamson school colors	UST school colors
La Salle	UST school colors	Ateneo school colors	UP school colors	Adamson school colors	UST school colors	Ateneo school colors	UP school colors	Adamson school colors
UP	Ateneo school colors	La Salle school colors	Adamson school colors	UST school colors	Ateneo school colors	La Salle school colors	Adamson school colors	UST school colors
UST	La Salle school colors	Adamson school colors	UP school colors	Ateneo school colors	La Salle school colors	Adamson school colors	Ateneo school colors	UP school colors

= Win; = Loss

===== Scores =====
Teams	AdU	ATENEO	DLSU	UP	UST
Adamson Lady Falcons	—	8–0^{5}	7–0^{6}	12–4^{6}	7–0^{6}
Ateneo Blue Eagles	0–16^{3}	—	0–22^{3}	0–16^{3}	6–14^{6} (Note: The initial opening match on March 8 was suspended at 8–3 in favor of UST at the bottom of the third inning due to heavy rain.)
De La Salle Lady Batters	0–9^{5}	9–1^{5}	—	0–7^{6}	9–12
UP Fighting Maroons	1–4	21–0^{4}	13–7	—	3–0
UST Tiger Softbelles	6–8	10–1^{5}	5–6	1–6	—

Legend: Blue = left column team win; Red = top row team win.

Results to the right and top of the gray cells are first round games, those to the left and below are second round games. Superscript is the number of innings played before the mercy rule applied.

==== Final round ====
===== Battle for Third =====
April 1, 2025 10:00 AM at Rizal Memorial Baseball Stadium
Team	1	2	3	4	5	6	7	R	H	E
DLSU Lady Batters	0	1	3	0	0	3	0	7	10	1
UST Tiger Softbelles	4	0	2	2	0	0	X	8	12	2

===== Finals =====
====== Game 1 ======
April 1, 2025 8:00 AM at Rizal Memorial Baseball Stadium
Team	1	2	3	4	5	6	7	R	H	E
UP Fighting Maroons	2	0	0	1	0	0	0	3	6	1
AdU Lady Falcons	1	1	0	1	0	3	X	6	10	2

====== Game 2 ======
April 5, 2025 9:00 AM at Rizal Memorial Baseball Stadium
Team	1	2	3	4	5	6	7	R	H	E
AdU Lady Falcons	0	2	0	0	2	0	0	4	6	1
UP Fighting Maroons	0	0	0	0	0	0	0	0	1	3

==== Awards ====
- Most Valuable Player: Nickole Dela Cruz (UP Fighting Maroons)
- Rookie of the Year: Jhaycel Roldan (Adamson Lady Falcons)
- Best Pitcher: Glory Alonzo (Adamson Lady Falcons)
- Most Stolen Bases: Angel Joanna Pascual (UP Fighting Maroons)
- Most RBIs: Nickole Dela Cruz (UP Fighting Maroons)
- Most Home Runs: Angel Kaye Bedaño (UST Tiger Softbelles)
- Best Slugger: Nickole Dela Cruz (UP Fighting Maroons)
- Best Hitter: Nickole Dela Cruz (UP Fighting Maroons)

== Fencing ==
The UAAP fencing championships began on April 22, 2025 at the Rizal Memorial Coliseum in Manila.

=== Men's tournament ===
Rank	Team	Medals			
Rank	Team	1st place, gold medalist(s)	2nd place, silver medalist(s)	3rd place, bronze medalist(s)	Total
1st place, gold medalist(s)	UE	3	3	1	7
2nd place, silver medalist(s)	UP	2	1	2	5
3rd place, bronze medalist(s)	La Salle (H)	1	0	4	5
4	UST	0	2	3	5
5	Ateneo	0	0	2	2

=== Women's tournament ===
Rank	Team	Medals			
Rank	Team	1st place, gold medalist(s)	2nd place, silver medalist(s)	3rd place, bronze medalist(s)	Total
1st place, gold medalist(s)	UST	3	3	1	7
2nd place, silver medalist(s)	UE	2	2	2	6
3rd place, bronze medalist(s)	UP	1	1	4	6
4	La Salle (H)	0	0	3	3
5	Ateneo	0	0	2	2

=== Boys' tournament ===
Rank	Team	Medals			
Rank	Team	1st place, gold medalist(s)	2nd place, silver medalist(s)	3rd place, bronze medalist(s)	Total
1st place, gold medalist(s)	UE	5	2	1	8
2nd place, silver medalist(s)	UST	1	2	4	7
3rd place, bronze medalist(s)	Ateneo	0	2	4	6
4	DLSZ (H)	0	0	3	3
5	UPIS	0	0	0	0

=== Girls' tournament ===
Rank	Team	Medals			
Rank	Team	1st place, gold medalist(s)	2nd place, silver medalist(s)	3rd place, bronze medalist(s)	Total
1st place, gold medalist(s)	UE	2	3	3	8
2nd place, silver medalist(s)	UST	2	1	2	5
3rd place, bronze medalist(s)	DLSZ (H)	1	2	4	7
4	Ateneo	1	0	3	4

== 3×3 basketball ==
The UAAP 3x3 basketball championships were held from April 28 to May 4, 2025. The tournament venue was the Ayala Malls Manila Bay in Parañaque.

=== Men's tournament ===
==== Elimination round ====
Pos	Team	W	L	PCT	Qualification
1	NU Bulldogs	6	1	.857	Advanced to the semifinals
2	UST Growling Tigers	5	2	.714	Advanced to the semifinals
3	Adamson Soaring Falcons	4	3	.571	Advanced to the semifinals
4	De La Salle Green Archers	4	3	.571	Advanced to the semifinals
5	UE Red Warriors	4	3	.571	
6	FEU Tamaraws	2	5	.286	
7	UP Fighting Maroons (H)	2	5	.286	
8	Ateneo Blue Eagles	1	6	.143	

Source: UAAP Season 87 3x3
Rules for classification: 1) winning percentage; 2) head-to-head record; 3) head-to-head goal average (quotient); 4) overall quotient
(H) Hosts

==== Final round ====
===== Bracket =====
Semifinals
1	NU	14
4	La Salle	17*
2	UST	16
3	Adamson	14

Final
4	La Salle	15
2	UST	12
Third place
1	NU	20
3	Adamson	21

* = Overtime

===== Match results =====
All times are Philippine Standard Time (UTC+08:00).

Semifinals
Date	Time	Team 1	Score	Team 2
May 04	12:00	NU Bulldogs	14–17	De La Salle Green Archers
May 04	12:20	UST Growling Tigers	16–14; Overtime	Adamson Soaring Falcons

Third place
Date	Time	Team 1	Score	Team 2
May 04	14:00	Adamson Soaring Falcons	21–20	NU Bulldogs

Final
Date	Time	Team 1	Score	Team 2
May 04	16:00	De La Salle Green Archers	15–12	UST Growling Tigers

=== Women's tournament ===
==== Elimination round ====
Pos	Team	W	L	PCT	Qualification
1	UST Growling Tigresses	7	0	1.000	Advanced to the semifinals
2	UP Fighting Maroons (H)	5	2	.714	Advanced to the semifinals
3	FEU Lady Tamaraws	4	3	.571	Advanced to the semifinals
4	Ateneo Blue Eagles	4	3	.571	Advanced to the semifinals
5	NU Lady Bulldogs	3	4	.429	
6	De La Salle Lady Archers	3	4	.429	
7	Adamson Lady Falcons	2	5	.286	
8	UE Lady Red Warriors	0	7	.000	

Source: UAAP Season 87 3x3
Rules for classification: 1) winning percentage; 2) head-to-head record; 3) head-to-head goal average (quotient); 4) overall quotient
(H) Hosts

==== Final round ====
===== Bracket =====
Semifinals
1	UST	10
4	Ateneo	14
2	UP	12
3	FEU	13

Final
4	Ateneo	21
3	FEU	17
Third place
1	UST	15
2	UP	14

===== Match results =====
All times are Philippine Standard Time (UTC+08:00).

Semifinals
Date	Time	Team 1	Score	Team 2
May 04	11:20	UST Growling Tigresses	10–14	Ateneo Blue Eagles
May 04	11:40	UP Fighting Maroons	12–13	FEU Lady Tamaraws

Third place
Date	Time	Team 1	Score	Team 2
May 04	13:40	UP Fighting Maroons	14–15	UST Growling Tigresses

Final
Date	Time	Team 1	Score	Team 2
May 04	15:40	Ateneo Blue Eagles	21–17	FEU Lady Tamaraws

=== Boys' tournament ===
==== Elimination round ====
Pos	Team	W	L	PCT	Qualification
1	FEU–D Baby Tamaraws	7	0	1.000	Advanced to the semifinals
2	Ateneo Blue Eagles	4	3	.571	Advanced to the semifinals
3	NUNS Bullpups	4	3	.571	Advanced to the semifinals
4	Adamson Baby Falcons	4	3	.571	Advanced to the semifinals
5	UST Tiger Cubs	3	4	.429	
6	UPIS Junior Fighting Maroons (H)	3	4	.429	
7	UE Junior Red Warriors	2	5	.286	
8	Zobel Junior Archers	1	6	.143	

Source: UAAP Season 87 3x3
Rules for classification: 1) winning percentage; 2) head-to-head record; 3) head-to-head goal average (quotient); 4) overall quotient
(H) Hosts

==== Final round ====
===== Bracket =====
Semifinals
1	FEU–D	19*
4	Adamson	17
2	Ateneo	9
3	NUNS	18

Final
1	FEU–D	16
3	NUNS	15
Third place
4	Adamson	17*
2	Ateneo	14

* = Overtime

===== Match results =====
All times are Philippine Standard Time (UTC+08:00).

Semifinals
Date	Time	Team 1	Score	Team 2
May 04	10:40	FEU–D Baby Tamaraws	19–17; Overtime	Adamson Baby Falcons
May 04	11:00	Ateneo Blue Eagles	9–18	NUNS Bullpups

Third place
Date	Time	Team 1	Score	Team 2
May 04	13:20	Ateneo Blue Eagles	14–17; Overtime	Adamson Baby Falcons

Final
Date	Time	Team 1	Score	Team 2
May 04	15:20	FEU–D Baby Tamaraws	16–15	NUNS Bullpups

=== Girls' tournament ===
==== Elimination round ====
Pos	Team	W	L	PCT	Qualification
1	UST Junior Tigresses	3	0	1.000	Advanced to the final
2	NUNS Lady Bullpups	2	1	.667	Advanced to the final
3	Zobel Junior Lady Archers	1	2	.333	Advanced to the third place match
4	Ateneo Blue Eagles	0	3	.000	Advanced to the third place match

Source: UAAP Season 87 3x3
Rules for classification: 1) winning percentage; 2) head-to-head record; 3) head-to-head goal average (quotient); 4) overall quotient

==== Final round ====
===== Match results =====
All times are Philippine Standard Time (UTC+08:00).

Third place
Date	Time	Team 1	Score	Team 2
May 04	13:00	Zobel Junior Lady Archers	21–3	Ateneo Blue Eagles

Final
Date	Time	Team 1	Score	Team 2
May 04	15:00	UST Junior Tigresses	14–13	NUNS Lady Bullpups

=== Junior high school tournament ===
==== Elimination round ====
Pos	Team	W	L	PCT	Qualification
1	Ateneo Blue Eagles	7	0	1.000	Advanced to the semifinals
2	FEU–D Baby Tamaraws	5	2	.714	Advanced to the semifinals
3	UST Tiger Cubs	5	2	.714	Advanced to the semifinals
4	UPIS Junior Fighting Maroons (H)	4	3	.571	Advanced to the semifinals
5	UE Junior Red Warriors	4	3	.571	
6	NUNS Bullpups	2	5	.286	
7	Zobel Junior Archers	1	6	.143	
8	Adamson Baby Falcons	0	7	.000	

Source: UAAP Season 87 3x3
Rules for classification: 1) winning percentage; 2) head-to-head record; 3) head-to-head goal average (quotient); 4) overall quotient
(H) Hosts

==== Final round ====
===== Bracket =====
Semifinals
1	Ateneo	21
4	UPIS	18
2	FEU–D	19
3	UST	21

Final
1	Ateneo	22
3	UST	19
Third place
4	UPIS	22*
2	FEU–D	20

* = Overtime

===== Match results =====
All times are Philippine Standard Time (UTC+08:00).

Semifinals
Date	Time	Team 1	Score	Team 2
May 04	10:00	Ateneo Blue Eagles	21–18	UPIS Junior Fighting Maroons
May 04	10:20	FEU–D Baby Tamaraws	19–21	UST Tiger Cubs

Third place
Date	Time	Team 1	Score	Team 2
May 04	12:40	FEU–D Baby Tamaraws	20–22; Overtime	UPIS Junior Fighting Maroons

Final
Date	Time	Team 1	Score	Team 2
May 04	14:40	Ateneo Blue Eagles	22–19	UST Tiger Cubs

=== Medalists and Awards ===
Division	Gold	Silver	Bronze
Men's tournament	De La Salle Green Archers; Earl Jared Abadam; Andrei Dungo; Elaijah Gollena; Jan Clement Macalalag; Vhoris Marasigan	UST Growling Tigers; Leonardo Amiel Acido; Mark Angelo Crisostomo; Glenn Isaac Danting; Zain Mahmood; Alejandro Melecio	Adamson Soaring Falcons; Emmanuel John Anabo; Kenji Laurence Cañete; Justin Allen Ignacio; Cedrick Manzano; Ray Allen Torres
Women's tournament	Ateneo Blue Eagles; Junize Calago; Katelynn Cancio; Kacey Dela Rosa; Lauren Ysabel Lopez; Kailah Jade Oani	FEU Lady Tamaraws; Maxene de la Torre; Lorelie Gavaran; Erica Joi Lopez; Cassandra Shane Salvani; Yvette Marie Villanueva	UST Growling Tigresses; Nicole Anne Danganan; Vergen Apple Maglupay; Kent Jane Pastrana; Karylle Sierba; Angelika Soriano
Boys' tournament	FEU–D Baby Tamaraws; Marc Daniel Burgos; Wilhalm Lawrence Cabonilas; Sam Hall; Mico Sebastian Pascual; Liam Rasheed Salangsang	NUNS Bullpups; Carl Maxi Alfanta; Juancho Miguel Palanca; Thomas Pillado; Alnhumaeri Usop	Adamson Baby Falcons; Johnray Abayon; Mark Esperanza; John Earl Medina; Louis Allen Perez; Zahir Raheem Sajili
Girls' tournament	UST Junior Tigresses; Bea Banate; Barby Dajao; Katrina Insoy; Rhiane Perez; Lea Pinuela	NUNS Lady Bullpups; Ashlyn Nicole Abong; KJ Guada Badajos; Ma. Christina Lapasaran; Hasly Mallari; Zaydhen Rosano	Zobel Junior Lady Archers; Princess Aveh Cordero; Erica Mae de Luna; Sofia Martinez; Naima Navarro
JHS tournament	Ateneo Blue Eagles; Simone Jacob "Sky" Jazul; Jeff Juangco; Zane Xavier Kallos; Yohanne Lacsamana; Quintino Molina	UST Tiger Cubs; Roi Adrian Balague; Dustin Keith Bathan; Nickson Cabañero; John Carl Canapi; Jeremiah Jubilado	UPIS Junior Fighting Maroons; Reuben Daniel Cobico; Jhustin Hallare; Kean Jader Poquiz; Matt Cedric Rosete; Lino Tubongbanua Jr.

Division	Most Valuable Player	Rookie of the Year
Men	Andrei Dungo; De La Salle Green Archers	John Rey Pasaol; FEU Tamaraws
Women	Kacey dela Rosa; Ateneo Blue Eagles	Karylle Sierba; UST Growling Tigers
Boys	Liam Rasheed Salangsang; FEU–D Baby Tamaraws	—
Girls	Barby Dajao; UST Junior Tigresses	Tyler Hope Templo; Ateneo Blue Eagles
JHS	Simone Jacob "Sky" Jazul; Ateneo Blue Eagles	—

== Esports ==
=== First Semester ===
Esports was a special event that took place at the Areté Creativity and Innovation hub within the Ateneo de Manila University. It served as the prelude to the official opening of UAAP Season 87.

Game title	Duration	Location	Ref.
NBA 2K24 (PlayStation 5)	Aug 13–15	Doreen Black Box Theater	
Valorant (PC)	Aug 13–16	Hyundai Hall; Dark League Studios	
Mobile Legends: Bang Bang (Mobile)	Aug 17–21	Hyundai Hall	

==== Medal summary ====
Event	Gold	Silver	Bronze
NBA 2K24 (PlayStation 5)	Paolo Jesus Medina; Ateneo Blue Eagles	Kegan Audric Yap; Viridis Arcus Esports	Eryx Daniel Delos Reyes; Teletigers Esports Club
Valorant (PC)	Viridis Arcus Esports; Aaron Francis Sablay; Derrick Ong; Miguel Fernando Dy; Gerardo Luis Corpus II; Lucas Gruenberg; Lance Elmo Gacayan	Teletigers Esports Club; Carl Angelo Baldovia; Nathan Kyle Manuta; Damien Joshua Santos; John Matthew Cuaresma; Erl Adrik Mariano; Angelo Kyan Ysibido	Ateneo Blue Eagles; Joaquin Stuart De Guia; Juancho Manuel Garcia; John Michael Amador; Christian Emmanuel Owen; Joaquin Angelo Antonio; Juan Antonio Rosales
Valorant (PC)	Viridis Arcus Esports; Aaron Francis Sablay; Derrick Ong; Miguel Fernando Dy; Gerardo Luis Corpus II; Lucas Gruenberg; Lance Elmo Gacayan	Teletigers Esports Club; Carl Angelo Baldovia; Nathan Kyle Manuta; Damien Joshua Santos; John Matthew Cuaresma; Erl Adrik Mariano; Angelo Kyan Ysibido	UP Fighting Maroons; Lance Veyonce Clemente; Nathan Gabriel Danac; Jose Benedicto Dasas; Rafael Anton Somera; Cyrus Toring; Paul Julian Uson
Mobile Legends: Bang Bang (Mobile)	UE Zenith Warriors; Arhon Jen Cabigting; John Lawrence Chavez; Ariel Markgelo Dolar; Ryan-ver Federizo; Elijah Mark Vilaray	Teletigers Esports Club; Wayne Edward Valentino; Arjohn Rainer Roxas; Benjamin Errol Lukban; Rammuell Iro Belga; Angel Saliuan; Jose Miguel Odfina	FEU Tamaraws Esports; Benedict Ablanida; Jordan Homer Eder; Dashmielle Farin; Kevin Richard Reyes; Micole Justin Wage; Paolo Miguel Sanchez
Mobile Legends: Bang Bang (Mobile)	UE Zenith Warriors; Arhon Jen Cabigting; John Lawrence Chavez; Ariel Markgelo Dolar; Ryan-ver Federizo; Elijah Mark Vilaray	Teletigers Esports Club; Wayne Edward Valentino; Arjohn Rainer Roxas; Benjamin Errol Lukban; Rammuell Iro Belga; Angel Saliuan; Jose Miguel Odfina	NU Bulldogs; Rendell Bangsal; Harold James Blas; John Ver Gerez; Angel Christian Ico; Robby Miguel Martin; Josh Prince Paculan

==== NBA 2K ====
===== Group A =====
====== Team standings ======
Pos	Team	W	L	PCT	GB	Qualification
1	Teletigers Esports Club	6	1	.857	—	Advances to best-of-three semifinals
2	Ateneo Blue Eagles (H)	5	2	.714	1	Advances to best-of-three semifinals
3	FEU Tamaraws Esports	5	2	.714	1	
4	UP Fighting Maroons	5	2	.714	1	
5	Viridis Arcus Esports	3	4	.429	3	
6	Adamson Falcons	2	5	.286	4	
7	UE Zenith Warriors	1	6	.143	5	
8	NU Bulldogs	0	7	.000	6	

Rules for classification: 1) winning percentage; 2) head-to-head record; 3) head-to-head point differential; 4) overall point differential
(H) Hosts

===== Group B =====
====== Team standings ======
Pos	Team	W	L	PCT	GB	Qualification
1	Teletigers Esports Club	7	0	1.000	—	Advances to best-of-three semifinals
2	Viridis Arcus Esports	6	1	.857	1	Advances to best-of-three semifinals
3	Ateneo Blue Eagles (H)	4	3	.571	3	
4	FEU Tamaraws Esports	3	4	.429	4	
5	NU Bulldogs	3	4	.429	4	
6	UE Zenith Warriors	3	4	.429	4	
7	Adamson Falcons	1	6	.143	6	
8	UP Fighting Maroons	1	6	.143	6	

Rules for classification: 1) winning percentage; 2) head-to-head record; 3) head-to-head point differential; 4) overall point differential
(H) Hosts

===== Bracket =====
Semifinals (Best-of-three series)
A1	UST	53	83	67
B2	La Salle	65	72	88
B1	UST	92	81
A2	Ateneo	96	119

Finals (Best-of-three series)
B2	La Salle	75	93	63
A2	Ateneo	77	89	74
Third place (Best-of-three series)
A1	UST	72	71
B1	UST	63	57

==== Valorant ====
===== Group A =====
====== Team standings ======
Pos	Team	W	D	L	PCT	GB	Qualification
1	Viridis Arcus Esports	3	0	0	1.000	—	Advances to best-of-three semifinals
2	Ateneo Blue Eagles (H)	1	1	1	.500	1.5	Advances to best-of-three semifinals
3	Adamson Falcons	1	1	1	.500	1.5	
4	FEU Tamaraws Esports	0	0	3	.000	3	

Rules for classification: 1) winning percentage; 2) head-to-head record; 3) head-to-head point differential; 4) overall point differential
(H) Hosts

===== Group B =====
====== Team standings ======
Pos	Team	W	D	L	PCT	GB	Qualification
1	Teletigers Esports Club	2	1	0	.833	—	Advances to best-of-three semifinals
2	UP Fighting Maroons	2	1	0	.833	—	Advances to best-of-three semifinals
3	UE Zenith Warriors	0	1	2	.167	2	
4	NU Bulldogs	0	1	2	.167	2	

Rules for classification: 1) winning percentage; 2) head-to-head record; 3) head-to-head point differential; 4) overall point differential

===== Bracket =====
Semifinals (Best-of-three series)
A1	La Salle	13	9	13
B2	UP	2	13	9
B1	UST	13	13
A2	Ateneo	6	7

Finals (Best-of-three series)
A1	La Salle	13	13
B1	UST	5	7

==== Mobile Legends: Bang Bang ====
===== Group A =====
====== Team standings ======
Pos	Team	W	D	L	PCT	GB	Qualification
1	FEU Tamaraws Esports	2	1	0	.833	—	Advances to best-of-three semifinals
2	NU Bulldogs	1	1	1	.500	1	Advances to best-of-three semifinals
3	Viridis Arcus Esports	0	3	0	.500	1	
4	Ateneo Blue Eagles (H)	0	1	2	.167	2	

Rules for classification: 1) winning percentage; 2) head-to-head record; 3) head-to-head point differential; 4) overall point differential
(H) Hosts

===== Group B =====
====== Team standings ======
Pos	Team	W	D	L	PCT	GB	Qualification
1	Teletigers Esports Club	3	0	0	1.000	—	Advances to best-of-three semifinals
2	UE Zenith Warriors	1	1	1	.500	1.5	Advances to best-of-three semifinals
3	Adamson Falcons	1	0	2	.333	2	
4	UP Fighting Maroons	0	1	2	.167	2.5	

Rules for classification: 1) winning percentage; 2) head-to-head record; 3) head-to-head point differential; 4) overall point differential

===== Bracket =====
Semifinals (Best-of-three series)
A1	FEU	1
B2	UE	2
B1	UST	2
A2	NU	0

Finals (Best-of-three series)
B2	UE	2
B1	UST	0

=== Second Semester ===
Esports returned as a special event in the next semester with the same franchises under a new first-to-two group stage format for all titles.

Game title	Duration	Location	Ref.
Valorant (PC)	May 7–11	Gateway 2 Quantum Skyview	
NBA 2K25 (PlayStation 5)	May 13–16	Gateway 2 Quantum Skyview	
Mobile Legends: Bang Bang (Mobile)	May 13–16	Gateway 2 Quantum Skyview	

==== Medal summary ====
Event	Gold	Silver	Bronze
NBA 2K25 (PlayStation 5)	Ateneo Blue Eagles; Luis Miguel Jovellanos; Justin Carl Lagac; Paolo Jesus Medina (C)	UST Teletigers Esports Club; Daemiel Erzbet Argame (C); Gideon Marty Del Val; Eryx Daniel Delos Reyes	De La Salle Green Aces; Rhiean Gabriel Bandola; Jose Doniel Luis Parducho; Kegan Audric Yap (C)
NBA 2K25 (PlayStation 5)	Ateneo Blue Eagles; Luis Miguel Jovellanos; Justin Carl Lagac; Paolo Jesus Medina (C)	UST Teletigers Esports Club; Daemiel Erzbet Argame (C); Gideon Marty Del Val; Eryx Daniel Delos Reyes	Adamson Soaring Falcons; Aaron Joshua Advincula; Regimio Aguinaldo III; Joaquin Lorenzo Obado
Valorant (PC)	De La Salle Green Aces; Gerardo Luis Corpus II; Miguel Fernando Dy; Thomas Gavin Eusebio; Lance Elmo Gacayan; Xavier Desiderio Juan (C); Aaron Francis Sablay	FEU Tamaraws; Chris Jerome Abulencia; Rafael Joy Balleza; Mark David Bastes (C); Jadine Luis Ladines; Andro Lapinid; Breinan Lim	Ateneo Blue Eagles; John Michael Amador; Joaquin Angelo Antonio; Joaquin Stuart De Guia; Paolo Alonso Lopez; Tristan Luis Monsod (C); Christian Emmanuel Owen
Valorant (PC)	De La Salle Green Aces; Gerardo Luis Corpus II; Miguel Fernando Dy; Thomas Gavin Eusebio; Lance Elmo Gacayan; Xavier Desiderio Juan (C); Aaron Francis Sablay	FEU Tamaraws; Chris Jerome Abulencia; Rafael Joy Balleza; Mark David Bastes (C); Jadine Luis Ladines; Andro Lapinid; Breinan Lim	UP Fighting Maroons; Lance Veyonce Clemente; Nathan Gabriel Danac; Jose Benedicto Dasas; Ryan Alexander Ngkaion; Rafael Anton Somera (C); Paul Julian Uson
Mobile Legends: Bang Bang (Mobile)	De La Salle Green Aces; Ryu Lewis Godoy; Aaron Joshua Lim; Kent Xavier Lopez; Journey Nixon Ong; Gabriel Sanchez; Joshua Nathaniel Tating	NU Bulldogs; Rendell Bangsal; Harold James Blas; Johann Deondrei Estacio; Kirk Clement Dave Herrero; Robby Miguel Martin; Josh Prince Paculan	UST Teletigers Esports Club; Denmar Balingit; Ramuell Iro Belga; Matt Cañarejo; Benjamin Errol Lukban; Juliann Calvin Ortega; Arjohn Rainier Roxas (C)
Mobile Legends: Bang Bang (Mobile)	De La Salle Green Aces; Ryu Lewis Godoy; Aaron Joshua Lim; Kent Xavier Lopez; Journey Nixon Ong; Gabriel Sanchez; Joshua Nathaniel Tating	NU Bulldogs; Rendell Bangsal; Harold James Blas; Johann Deondrei Estacio; Kirk Clement Dave Herrero; Robby Miguel Martin; Josh Prince Paculan	FEU Tamaraws; Benedict Ablanida; Jordan Homer Eder; Dashmielle Farin; Kobi Andrew Ortua; Kevin Richard Reyes; Micole Justine Wage

==== Valorant ====
===== Group A =====
====== Team standings ======
Pos	Team	W	L	PCT	GB	Qualification
1	De La Salle Green Aces	3	0	1.000	—	Advances to best-of-three semifinals
2	Ateneo Blue Eagles (H)	2	1	.667	1	Advances to best-of-three semifinals
3	UE Red Warriors	1	2	.333	2	
4	NU Bulldogs	0	3	.000	3	

Rules for classification: 1) winning percentage; 2) head-to-head record; 3) head-to-head point differential; 4) overall point differential
(H) Hosts

===== Group B =====
====== Team standings ======
Pos	Team	W	L	PCT	GB	Qualification
1	FEU Tamaraws	3	0	1.000	—	Advances to best-of-three semifinals
2	UP Fighting Maroons	2	1	.667	1	Advances to best-of-three semifinals
3	UST Teletigers Esports Club	1	2	.333	2	
4	Adamson Soaring Falcons	0	3	.000	3	

Rules for classification: 1) winning percentage; 2) head-to-head record; 3) head-to-head point differential; 4) overall point differential

===== Bracket =====
Semifinals (Best-of-three series)
A1	La Salle	13	13
B2	UP	7	1
B1	FEU	13	13
A2	Ateneo	4	10

Finals (Best-of-three series)
A1	La Salle	13	13
B1	FEU	10	10

===== Awards =====
- Finals Most Valuable Player: Xavier Juan (De La Salle Green Aces)

==== NBA 2K ====
===== Group A =====
====== Team standings ======
Pos	Team	W	L	PCT	GB	Qualification
1	Ateneo Blue Eagles (H)	3	0	1.000	—	Advances to best-of-three semifinals
2	De La Salle Green Aces	2	1	.667	1	Advances to best-of-three semifinals
3	UP Fighting Maroons	1	2	.333	2	
4	FEU Tamaraws	0	3	.000	3	

Rules for classification: 1) winning percentage; 2) head-to-head record; 3) head-to-head point differential; 4) overall point differential
(H) Hosts

===== Group B =====
====== Team standings ======
Pos	Team	W	L	PCT	GB	Qualification
1	UST Teletigers Esports Club	3	0	1.000	—	Advances to best-of-three semifinals
2	Adamson Soaring Falcons	2	1	.667	1	Advances to best-of-three semifinals
3	NU Bulldogs	1	2	.333	2	
4	UE Red Warriors	0	3	.000	3	

Rules for classification: 1) winning percentage; 2) head-to-head record; 3) head-to-head point differential; 4) overall point differential

===== Bracket =====
Semifinals (Best-of-three series)
A1	Ateneo	65	79
B2	Adamson	53	62
B1	UST	67	68	68
A2	La Salle	45	76	56

Finals (Best-of-three series)
A1	Ateneo	77*	69
B1	UST	71	59

* = Overtime

===== Awards =====
- Finals Most Valuable Player: Luis Jovellanos (Ateneo Blue Eagles)

==== Mobile Legends: Bang Bang ====
===== Group A =====
====== Team standings ======
Pos	Team	W	L	PCT	GB	Qualification
1	UST Teletigers Esports Club	3	0	1.000	—	Advances to best-of-three semifinals
2	FEU Tamaraws	2	1	.667	1	Advances to best-of-three semifinals
3	Adamson Soaring Falcons	1	2	.333	2	
4	Ateneo Blue Eagles (H)	0	3	.000	3	

Rules for classification: 1) winning percentage; 2) head-to-head record; 3) head-to-head point differential; 4) overall point differential
(H) Hosts

===== Group B =====
====== Team standings ======
Pos	Team	W	L	PCT	GB	Qualification
1	NU Bulldogs	3	0	1.000	—	Advances to best-of-three semifinals
2	De La Salle Green Aces	2	1	.667	1	Advances to best-of-three semifinals
3	UE Red Warriors	1	2	.333	2	
4	UP Fighting Maroons	0	3	.000	3	

Rules for classification: 1) winning percentage; 2) head-to-head record; 3) head-to-head point differential; 4) overall point differential

===== Bracket =====
Semifinals (Best-of-three series)
A1	UST	0
B2	La Salle	2
B1	NU	2
A2	FEU	0

Finals (Best-of-three series)
B2	La Salle	2
B1	NU	1

===== Awards =====
- Finals Most Valuable Player: Aaron Lim (De La Salle Green Aces)

== Performance sports ==
=== Cheerdance ===
The UAAP Cheerdance Competition was held on December 1, 2024.

==== Team standings ====
Rank	Team	Order	Tumbling	Stunts	Tosses	Pyramids	Dance	Penalties	Points	Percentage
1st place, gold medalist(s)	NU Pep Squad	6th	86.5	91.5	91	85	368	-9	713	89.13%
2nd place, silver medalist(s)	Adamson Pep Squad	4th	76.5	85	88	84	349	-3	679.5	84.94%
3rd place, bronze medalist(s)	FEU Cheering Squad	8th	82	80	74	78.5	352.5	-17	650	81.25%
4	UE Pep Squad	2nd	60	82	87	80	334	-2	641	80.13%
5	UST Salinggawi Dance Troupe	3rd	69.5	74	77	78	347	-11	634.5	79.31%
6	UP Varsity Pep Squad	5th	53.5	64	68	72.5	319	-17	560	70.00%
7	DLSU Animo Squad	7th	49	61	63	68	297	-13	525	65.63%
8	Ateneo Blue Eagles	1st	44	65	71	70	270	-30	490	61.25%

=== Street dance ===
The UAAP Street Dance Competition was held on May 20, 2025.

==== Collegiate division ====
Rank	Team	Order	Artistic Total	Execution Total	Deductions	Points
1st place, gold medalist(s)	UP Street Dance Club	–	44.80	44.60	–	89.33
2nd place, silver medalist(s)	UST Prime	–	43.84	44.20	–	88.57
3rd place, bronze medalist(s)	La Salle Dance Company – Street	–	42.20	43.04	–	86.17
4	FEU Street Alliance	–	43.74	42.64	–	85.83
5	Company of Ateneo Dancers – Street	–	41.70	40.80	–	83.83
6	NU Dance Company	–	41.28	40.24	–	81.87
7	Adamson University Dance Company – Street	–	41.10	41.48	0.5	81.30
8	UE Street Warriors	–	35.12	35.50	–	71.00

==== High school division ====
Rank	Team	Order	Artistic Total	Execution Total	Deductions	Points
1st place, gold medalist(s)	Underdawgz	–	40.74	40.70	–	82.83
2nd place, silver medalist(s)	Indayog ng Atenistang Kabataan	–	39.96	40.92	–	80.97
3rd place, bronze medalist(s)	Adamson University Dance Company – Street SHS	–	40.54	40.20	1	78.57
4	UST Galvanize	–	38.24	36.00	–	75.83
5	Zobel Dance Crew	–	32.52	30.90	–	64.33

== General championship summary ==
The general champion is determined by a point system. The system gives 15 points to the champion team of a UAAP event, 12 to the runner-up, and 10 to the third placer. The following points: 8, 6, 4, 2 and 1 are given to the rest of the participating teams according to their order of finish.

=== Medal tables ===
==== Collegiate division ====
Rank	Team	Gold	Silver	Bronze	Total
1	University of Santo Tomas	8	7	9	24
2	National University	8	4	2	14
3	Far Eastern University	4	4	3	11
4	University of the Philippines Diliman*	3	5	7	15
5	Ateneo de Manila University	3	4	1	8
6	De La Salle University	2	6	6	14
7	University of the East	2	1	0	3
8	Adamson University	1	0	3	4
Totals (8 entries)		31	31	31	93

* Host nation (Season host); General champions
Notes: Results are final.

==== High school division ====
Rank	Team	Gold	Silver	Bronze	Total
1	University of Santo Tomas	11	11	1	23
2	University of the East	6	0	4	10
3	National University–Nazareth School	3	6	1	10
4	Far Eastern University–Diliman	3	1	4	8
5	Ateneo de Manila University	1	2	2	5
6	Adamson University	0	3	4	7
7	De La Salle Zobel	0	1	6	7
8	UP Integrated School*	0	0	2	2
Totals (8 entries)		24	24	24	72

* Host nation (Season host); General champions
Notes: Results are final.

=== General championship tally ===
==== Collegiate division ====
		Basketball		3x3 basketball		Volleyball (indoor)		Volleyball (beach)		Swimming		Chess		Tennis		Table tennis		Badminton		Taekwondo			Judo		Baseball	Softball	Football		Athletics		Fencing		Total			
Rank	Team	M	W	M	W	M	W	M	W	M	W	M	W	M	W	M	W	M	W	M	W	C	M	W	M	W	M	W	M	W	M	W	M	W	C	Overall
1	UST	10	12	12	10	10	10	15	12	8	8	15	4	12	15	15	15	8	8	10	12	15	15	12	10	10	8	10	10	12	8	15	166	165	15	346
2	UP (H)	15	6	2	8	4	4	8	6	10	12	12	6	10	10	6	4	10	15	8	4	8	12	6	6	12	10	8	15	10	12	10	140	121	8	269
3	La Salle	12	4	15	4	8	12	4	2	12	10	8	12	2	8	8	8	6	6	15	10	10	10	10	12	8	6	12	1	8	10	8	129	122	10	261
4	Ateneo	1	8	1	15	6	2	2	4	15	15	6	8	6	6	12	10	12	12	4	8	6	8	8	4	6	12	6	2	1	6	6	97	115	6	218
5	NU	2	15	8	6	15	15	12	15	—	—	—	10	15	12	—	—	15	10	12	15	12	—	—	15	—	—	—	6	6	—	—	100	104	12	216
6	FEU	4	2	4	12	12	8	10	10	—	—	10	15	—	—	4	12	—	—	6	6	4	—	—	—	—	15	15	12	15	—	—	77	95	4	176
7	Adamson	8	10	10	2	2	6	6	8	—	—	4	2	4	—	10	2	4	4	—	—	—	6	4	8	15	2	—	4	2	—	—	68	55	0	123
8	UE	6	1	6	1	1	1	1	1	—	—	—	—	8	—	2	6	—	—	—	—	—	—	15	—	—	4	—	8	4	15	12	51	41	0	92

(H) Season host; = Champion; = Runner-up; = Third place; — = No team.
Notes: Results are final.

==== High School division ====
		Basketball			3x3 basketball			Volleyball (indoor)		Volleyball (beach)		Swimming		Chess		Table tennis		Taekwondo	Judo		Football	Athletics		Fencing		Total		
Rank	Team	B	G	K	B	G	K	B	G	B	G	B	G	B	G	B	G	B	B	G	B	B	G	B	G	B	G	Overall
1	UST	15	15	12	6	15	12	15	10	15	12	15	15	12	12	15	15	12	12	12	15	15	12	12	12	159	130	313
2	DLSZ	4	10	6	1	10	2	4	6	6	4	10	8	6	6	8	12	8	8	10	10	6	4	8	10	79	80	167
3	NUNS	12	12	8	12	12	4	12	15	12	15	—	—	—	10	—	—	15	—	—	—	8	8	—	—	71	72	155
4	UE	6	—	15	2	—	6	10	—	2	—	—	—	—	—	10	10	—	15	15	—	10	15	15	15	70	55	146
5	Ateneo	2	8	4	8	8	15	2	2	1	—	12	12	8	—	4	4	6	10	—	6	4	6	10	8	73	48	140
6	FEU–D	10	—	10	15	—	8	6	8	10	8	—	—	15	15	—	—	10	—	—	12	—	—	—	—	78	31	127
7	Adamson	8	—	2	10	—	1	8	12	8	10	—	—	10	8	12	8	—	—	—	—	12	10	—	—	68	48	119
8	UPIS (H)	1	—	1	4	—	10	1	4	4	6	8	10	—	—	6	6	—	—	—	—	—	—	6	—	30	26	67

(H) Season host; = Champion; = Runner-up; = Third place; — = No team.
Notes: Results are final.

== Overall awards ==
The following were awarded during the closing ceremonies on May 20, 2025, at the SM Mall of Asia Arena.

=== Athlete of the Year ===
- Collegiate:
  - Individual sports: Chelsea Xan Tacay (UST Poomsae Jins), poomsae
  - Team sports: Andrei Dungo (De La Salle Green Archers), men's basketball and men's 3x3 basketball
  - Team sports: Kacey Dela Rosa (Ateneo Blue Eagles), women's basketball and women's 3x3 basketball
- High school:
  - Individual sports: Ruelle Canino (FEU–D Baby Tamaraws), girls' chess
  - Team sports: Liam Rasheed Salangsang (FEU–D Baby Tamaraws), boys' basketball and boys' 3x3 basketball

== See also ==
- NCAA Season 100
