= Barreto =

Barreto may refer to:

- Barreto (surname)
- Barreto, Niterói, a neighborhood in Brazil
- Barreto River, in Pará, Brazil
- Pereira Barreto, a municipality in Brazil
- Barretos, a municipality in Brazil
- Barreto (footballer, born 1985), Paulo Vitor de Souza Barreto, Brazilian footballer
- Barreto (footballer, born 1995), Gustavo Bonatto Barreto, Brazilian football defensive midfielder
