= UAAP fencing championships =

Fencing championship

The University Athletic Association of the Philippines fencing champions.

== List of champions ==
Demonstration sport Double championship Triple championship Quadruple championship

Season	Men's	Women's	Boys'	Girls'
59 (1996–97)	University of the Philippines Diliman (1)	University of the Philippines Diliman (1)		
60 (1997–98)	Not held			
61 (1998–99)	Not held			
62 (1999–00)	Not held			
63 (2000–01)	University of the East (1)	University of the Philippines Diliman (2)		
64 (2001–02)	University of the East (2)	University of the Philippines Diliman (3)		
65 (2002–03)	University of the East (3)	University of the Philippines Diliman (4)		
66 (2003–04)	University of the East (4)	University of the Philippines Diliman (5)		
67 (2004–05)	Far Eastern University (1)	University of the Philippines Diliman (6)		
68 (2005–06)	University of the East (5)	University of the East (1)		
69 (2006–07)	University of the East (6)	Ateneo de Manila University (1)		
70 (2007–08)	University of Santo Tomas (1)	University of the East (2)		
71 (2008–09)	University of Santo Tomas (2)	University of the East (3)	Ateneo de Manila University (1)	
72 (2009–10)	University of the East (7)	University of the East (4)	Ateneo de Manila University (2)	
73 (2010–11)	University of the Philippines Diliman (2)	University of the East (5)	University of the East (1)	
74 (2011–12)	University of Santo Tomas (3)	University of the East (6)	University of the East (2)	
75 (2012–13)	University of the East (8)	University of the East (7)	University of the East (3)	University of the East (1)
76 (2013–14)	University of the East (9)	University of the East (8)	University of the East (4)	University of the East (2)
77 (2014–15)	University of the East (10)	University of the East (9)	University of the East (5)	University of the East (3)
78 (2015–16)	University of the East (11)	University of the East (10)	University of the East (6)	University of the East (4)
79 (2016–17)	University of the East (12)	University of the East (11)	University of the East (7)	University of the East (5)
80 (2017–18)	University of the East (13)	University of the East (12)	University of the East (8)	University of the East (6)
81 (2018–19)	University of the East (14)	Ateneo de Manila University (2)	University of the East (9)	University of the East (7)
82 (2019–20)	University of the East (15)	University of the East (13)	University of the East (10)	University of the East (8)
83 (2020–21)	Cancelled due to COVID-19 pandemic			
84 (2021–22)	Not held due to COVID-19 pandemic			
85 (2022–23)	University of the East (16)	University of the East (14)	University of the East (11)	University of the East (9)
86 (2023–24)	University of the East (17)	University of the East (15)	University of the East (12)	University of the East (10)
87 (2024–25)	University of the East (18)	University of Santo Tomas (1)	University of the East (13)	University of the East (11)
88 (2025–26)	University of the East (19)	University of the East (16)	University of the East (14)	University of Santo Tomas (1)

=== Streaks ===
- University of the East owns the longest championship streak in the following divisions:
  - Men's = 10 (2012–2024)
  - Women's = 13 (2007–2024)
  - Boy's = 12 (2010–2024)
  - Girl's = 11 (2011–2024)

=== Double championship ===
- University of the Philippines won a "double crown" in 1996–97 Season (as a demonstration sport).
- University of the East won a "double crown" in 2005–06, 2009–10, 2010–11 and 2011–12 seasons.

=== Triple championship ===
- University of the East won a "triple championship" in UAAP Season 81 (2018–19).

=== Quadruple championship ===
- University of the East won a "quadruple championship" from 2012–13 to 2017–18 and 2019–20 UAAP seasons.

== Number of championships by school ==
University	Men's	Women's	Boys'	Girls'	Total
University of the East	15	13	10	8	46
University of the Philippines Diliman	1	5	0	0	6
University of Santo Tomas	3	1	0	1	5
Ateneo de Manila University	0	2	1	0	3
Far Eastern University	1	0	0	0	1
