= Apolaki Caldera =

Large caldera on the Benham rise east of the Philippines

Apolaki Crater
- Location within Luzon Location within Philippines Location within Southeast Asia

Highest point
- Coordinates: 16°30′N 124°45′E

Geography
- Location: Philippine Sea
- Country: Philippines

Geology
- Mountain type: caldera

The Apolaki Caldera is a volcanic caldera with a diameter of 150 kilometers (93 mi), making it the Earth's largest caldera. It is located within the Benham Rise (Philippine Rise) and was discovered in 2019 by Jenny Anne Barretto, a Filipino marine geophysicist and her team. The name "Apolaki" means "giant lord" in Filipino, and is also the name of the god of sun and war in some pantheons in Philippine mythology and the indigenous Philippine folk religions. The volcano has been inactive for millions of years.

== Geological history ==
Gravimetric analysis shows that the Philippine Rise, as the submarine mountain massif is named, is made of a 14-kilometer (9 mi) thick layer of magmatic and volcanic rocks. Rock samples ages range from 47.9 to 26 million years, when volcanic activity made up the massif.
