= SM By The Bay =

Seaside esplanade and amusement park in Pasay, Philippines

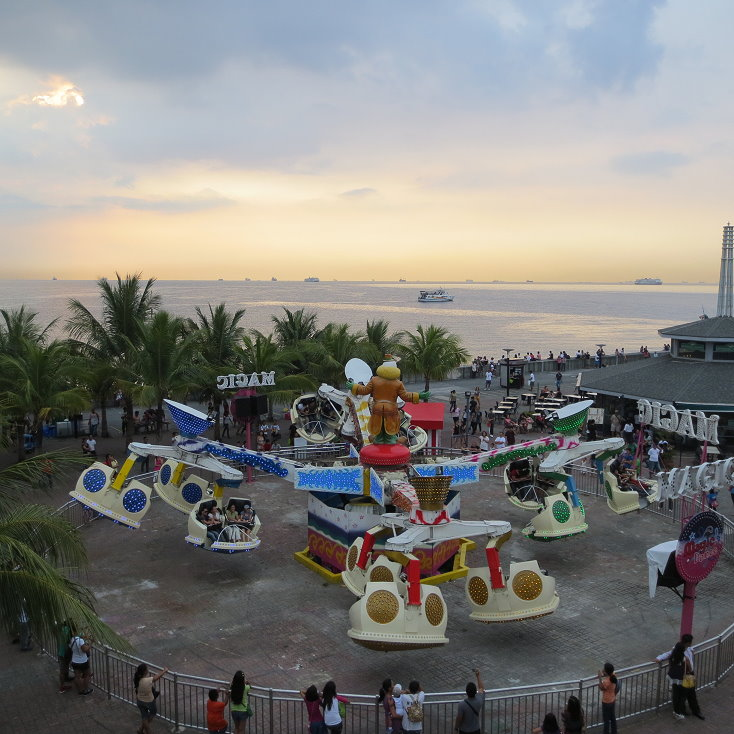
- The view of the amusement park, pictured in 2013
- Interactive map of SM By The Bay
- Location: Pasay, Metro Manila, Philippines
- Coordinates: 14°32′05″N 120°58′47″E
- Status: Operating
- Opened: November 20, 2007; 18 years ago (as San Miguel By the Bay); 2011; 15 years ago (as SM By the Bay)
- Owner: SM Prime Holdings

Attractions
- Total: 12

SM By The Bay is a 1.5-kilometer (0.93 mi) seaside esplanade and amusement park located within the SM Mall of Asia Complex in Bay City, Pasay, Philippines. Situated along the reclaimed shores of Manila Bay, it serves as an open-air extension of the SM Mall of Asia (MOA) and is managed by SM Supermalls, a subsidiary of SM Prime Holdings.

The park is recognized as a major leisure and tourism destination in Metro Manila, primarily known for its unobstructed views of the Manila Bay sunset. It features a wide array of al fresco dining establishments, recreational facilities, and an amusement park. The esplanade is a popular site for wellness activities, including jogging and cycling, as well as large-scale community events and firework displays.

== History ==
=== San Miguel By the Bay ===
SM By the Bay was originally established through a partnership between SM Prime Holdings and the San Miguel Corporation. It officially opened on November 20, 2007, under the name San Miguel By the Bay. Located along the esplanade of the SM Mall of Asia complex, the area was initially envisioned as a premier outdoor dining and lifestyle destination. At its inception, the 1.5-kilometer stretch featured a variety of restaurants and bars that exclusively served San Miguel products, reflecting the branding of its namesake sponsor.

=== Rebranding to SM By The Bay ===
In 2011, the park underwent a significant rebranding and was officially renamed SM By the Bay. This transition marked a shift from a purely dining and nightlife hub to a more comprehensive family entertainment complex. Following the rebranding, the area saw the introduction of the SM By the Bay Amusement Park, which integrated various carnival-style attractions and amusement rides along the Manila Bay waterfront.

== Amusement park ==
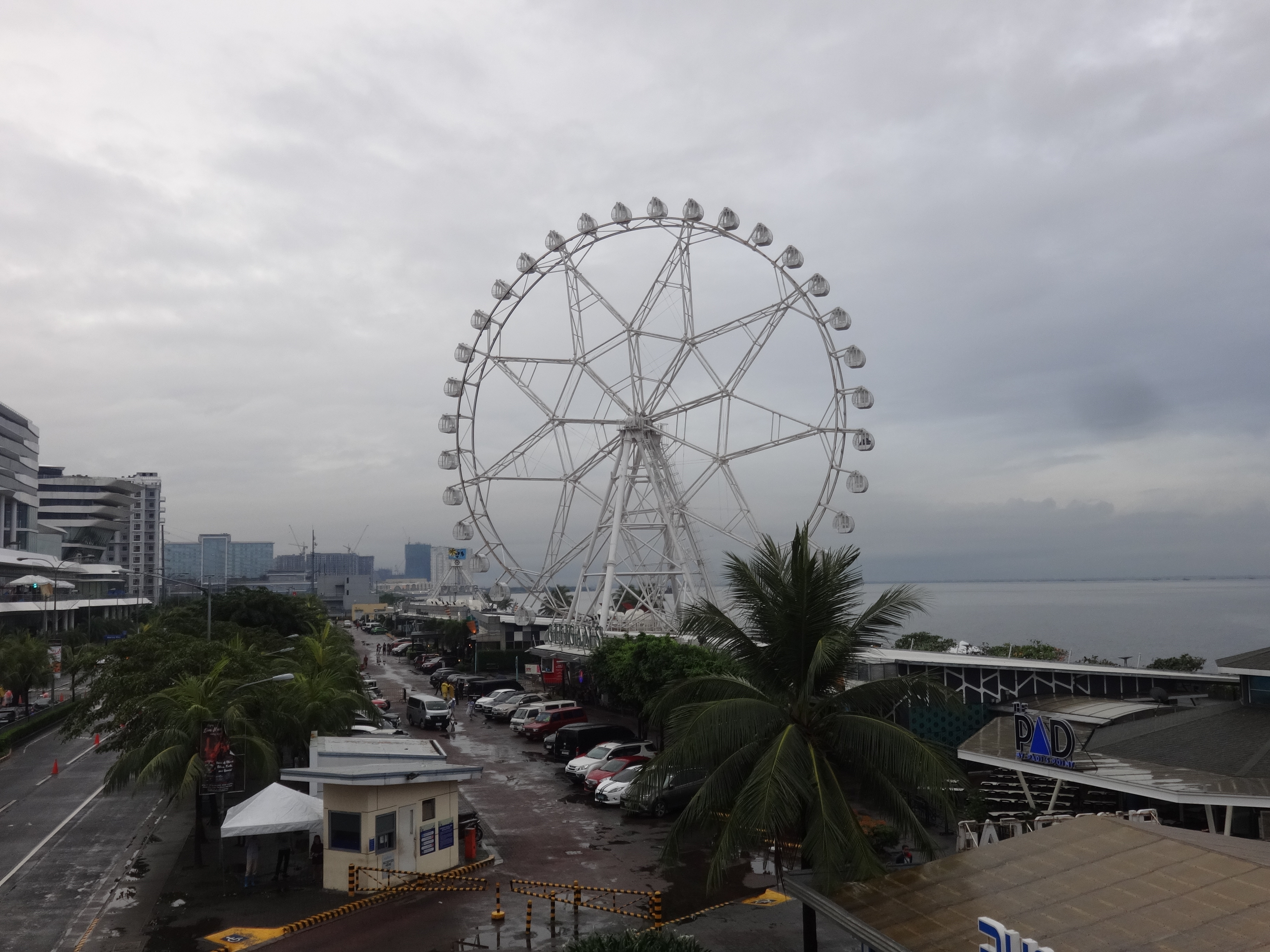
MOA Eye, one of SM By The Bay's main attractions

The northern portion of the strip is home to the SM By the Bay Amusement Park, which features over a dozen rides and carnival-style games. The park is a popular destination for families and tourists, particularly during sunset hours. Some of its rides are from the former SM Storyland in SM Southmall that was closed in May 2011. The amusement park opened on December 17, 2011.

- MOA Eye: The park's centerpiece, a 55-meter (180 ft) tall giant Ferris wheel featuring 36 air-conditioned gondolas. It provides panoramic views of Manila Bay and the Metro Manila skyline.
- Thrill Rides: Popular attractions for adrenaline seekers include the Dream Twister, Super Viking (a large swinging pirate ship), and the Drop Tower.
- Family & Kid-Friendly Rides: The park offers classic attractions such as the Grand Carousel, Bumper Cars, Lolly Swing, Barn Stormers, and the Bumble Bee ride.
- Transport Rides: Visitors can tour the length of the bay via the Road Train, a trackless train that traverses the esplanade, or the Cruise By the Bay ferry for a view from the water.
- Carnival Games: Traditional fairground kiosks offer games like Ring Toss, Hook a Duck, and Basketball, where visitors can win stuffed toys and prizes.

== Dining and Lifestyle ==
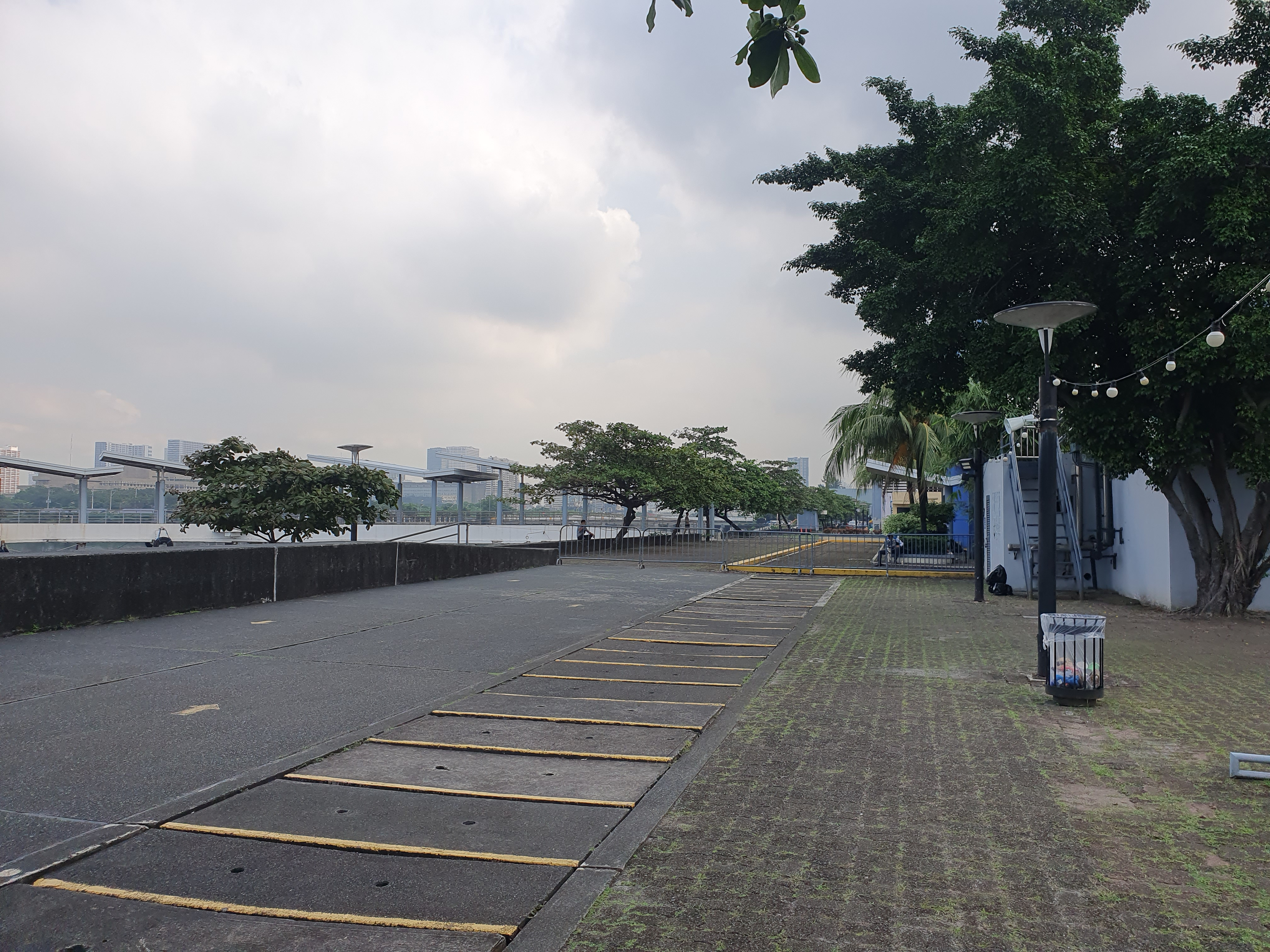
Northern side of the baywalk at SM By The Bay

The strip is known for its extensive "Seaside Boulevard" dining row, which features a mix of casual eateries, upscale bars, and buffet-style restaurants.

- Buffet Row: A concentrated area of popular "all-you-can-eat" establishments such as Buffet 101, La Fiesta, and Vikings, making it a major culinary destination.
- Open Spaces: The wide promenade is a frequent venue for outdoor activities, including jogging, biking (with rentals available on-site), and pet-walking.
- Events Venue: The park serves as the primary site for the annual Philippine International Pyromusical Competition and is a premier spot for viewing the New Year’s Eve fireworks displays.

== Incidents ==
- October 10, 2014: A fire broke out at the MOA Eye at around 10:07 am PHT. The fire happened at least seven minutes, leaving three of the Ferris wheel's 36 air-conditioned gondolas damaged. After the incident, the MOA Eye remained closed for at least seven days.
- November 12, 2020: A cargo vessel was stranded at the bayside area due to the strong winds brought by Typhoon Ulysses, according to Pasay Mayor Imelda Calixto-Rubiano. It also became a tourist attraction with people taking pictures of the said event.
- February 12, 2022: A Dream Twister ride from the mall's amusement park has an electrical malfunction; no one was reported hurt or injured in the incident.
- December 24, 2025: The Dream Twister ride experienced another technical malfunction; no one was reported hurt or injured in the incident.
