= Melchior Nunes Barreto =

Portuguese Jesuit priest and missionary (c. 1520–1571)

Melchior Nunes Barreto (Belchior) was a 16th century Portuguese Jesuit priest who acted as a missionary in India, China, and Japan. He was born c. 1520 in Porto (Oporto), Portugal, and died in Goa, Portuguese India on 6 October 1571. Some sources claim that he died on 10 August 1571.

== Career ==
Barreto was the son of Fernão (Fernam) Nunes Barreto, a local landlord in Porto. Barreto had four sisters who were sent to a convent, and three brothers: Gaspar, who inherited his father's property; João (Ioam), who became an abbot in Braga and later a bishop in Ethiopia; and Affonso, who was a priest. Between 1543 and 1544, Barreto joined the Society of Jesus in Coimbra, Portugal, claiming to be told to do so by the Virgin Mary in a dream. His application was approved by Peter Faber, a companion of Francis Xavier. In 1551, Barreto served as a missionary in Goa, which was a Portuguese colony. During his tenure as a missionary, he was appointed rector of the College at Baçaim (Vasai) by Francis Xavier, the founder of the Jesuits. While he was a rector in Goa, he filed a complaint with the authorities against Lutheran missionaries from Germany. They were then arrested. After the death of Francis Xavier and Gaspar Barazeuz in 1553, he became the provincial superior of the Jesuits in India. From 1554-1557 he left India for a mission to preach in Japan. On his return in 1557 he became the rector of the Jesuit college of Cochin (modern-day Kochi).

== Mission to East and South East Asia ==
From India, Barreto tried to sail to Japan through Malacca in 1554. He did not reach his intended destination at first. Instead, he visited several Islands in the Malaysian archipelago, including the island of Lampacau. He paid tribute to the tomb of Francis Xavier on Sancham. From Malaysia, Barreto continued on to the Portuguese enclave of Macau, south of Canton (Guangzhou). He reached the Portuguese enclave on November 20, 1555. He was one of the first Jesuits to visit China, and stayed for about 10 months. (The Jesuit effort to reach China began with the founder of the order, Francis Xavier, who never reached the mainland, dying after only a year on the Chinese island of Shangchuan.) Barreto was the first Catholic priest to be allowed to leave Macao and enter the city of Canton. His mission included ransoming three Portuguese prisoners.

During his mission, Barreto noted an indifference of the Chinese people toward their own religion, alongside low esteem for their clergy. From this, he concluded that China would be a hard target for Christian conversion. However, he did not give up on his goal to preach in Japan. In June 1556, after many failed attempts, he landed in Bungo Province, Japan, with forty other Portuguese citizens. Upon his arrival, he was received by the Bungo lord, where he would establish the first Jesuit Library. Barreto returned to India in 1557. In 1558, he wrote a partial report of his experiences in China and Japan.

== See also ==
- Full text of Chronica da Companhia de Iesu, na provincia de Portugal; e do que fizeram, nas conquistas d'este reyno, os religiosos, que na mesma provincia entràram, nos annos em que viveo S. Ignacio de Loyola, nosso fundador, available as scanned original 1645 manuscripts, and in text format, Lisboa:Por Paulo Craesbeeck, Imprint 1645, Imprint 1647, digitizing sponsor John Carter Brown Library. (accessed 5 October 2018).
