= Larry Barretto =

American novelist

- Born: May 30, 1890; Larchmont, New York, U.S.
- Died: December 30, 1971 (aged 81)
- Occupations: Novelist, war correspondent

Laurence Brevoort Barretto (May 30, 1890 – December 30, 1971) was an American novelist and war correspondent. He was the author of several books, and served as assistant editor of Adventure from 1920 to 1924.

His father was Gerard Morris and his mother Laura Brevoort Barretto (a descendant of Hendrick Brevoort, the early New Yorker whose farm became Greenwich Village).

In 1917, Barretto enlisted "in [the] Ambulance Service" and served in France and Europe; in 1919, he was awarded the Croix de guerre 1914–1918.

== See also ==
- Lost Gay Novels
