= Chiquita Barreto =

Paraguayan writer

Chiquita Barreto Burgos
- Born: Amelia Chiquita Barreto Burgos; 1947 (age 78–79); Caaguazú
- Occupation: Writer

Amelia "Chiquita" Barreto Burgos (born 1947) is a Paraguayan social anthropologist and writer. She is currently a professor at the Universidad del Norte in Paraguay and often works with the Union of Women for Mutual Help in Coronel Oviedo and student theatre productions.

== Biography ==
Chiquita Barreto Burgos was born in 1947 in the Paraguayan town of Caaguazú. She graduated from the Faculty of Pedagogy of the Catholic University of Paraguay.

On 11 December 2015, she received the Roque Gaona Literary Prize and six million Guaraní for her novel Los nombres que habito from the Society of Writers of Paraguay and Gaona family. On 5 April 2017, Barreto presented the new book ¿Dónde van los gatos cuando llueve? and again on 17 July with the novel Tiempo y Destiempo.
