= Augusto Barreto =

Portuguese fencer (1923–2017)

Personal information
- Nationality: Portuguese
- Born: Augusto Cassiano Neves de Mascarenhas de Andrade Barreto; 27 January 1923 Lisbon, Portugal
- Died: 3 January 2017 (aged 93) Lisbon, Portugal

Sport
- Sport: Fencing

Augusto Cassiano Neves de Mascarenhas de Andrade Barreto (27 January 1923 – 3 January 2017) was a Portuguese fencer. He competed in the team sabre event at the 1952 Summer Olympics.
