= Jenny Anne Barretto =

Geologist and geophysicist

- Education: University of the Philippines
- Known for: Discovery of the Apolaki Caldera
- Scientific career
- Fields: Geology; Geophysics; Marine geomorphology Bathymetry; Crystallography; Mineralogy
- Workplaces: GNS Science

Jenny Anne Barretto is a Filipino geologist and geophysicist based in New Zealand. She is credited for the discovery of Apolaki, the largest caldera in the world.

Barretto was born and raised in the Philippines. She acquired her master's degree in geology from the University of the Philippines in 1998.

== Career and research ==
Barretto initially worked at UP National Institute of Geological Sciences in Quezon City. She took part at the initial examination of the structure of Benham Rise; it was a prerequisite for the Philippine government's formal claim of the territory in 2012. They were able to prove the morphological affinity of Benham Rise to the country's largest island, Luzon, and therefore concluded that Benham Rise is an extension of the Philippines' continental platform. Barreto conducted several morphological and geological research within the expanse of the Philippines.

Barretto began working as a geologist and geophysicist for GNS Science in 2013.

Barretto led an in-depth research project on Benham Rise in 2015. Her team included Ray Wood from GNS Science and John Milsom from Gladestry Associates. The team made use of the data garnered from the initial study of the region, which was collected using a multi-beam bathymetry survey. In October 2019, they published the extensive research paper about its morphology and structure, and it featured the Apolaki Caldera, which Barretto named herself. Barretto noticed anomalies in the data that had been collected from the area and conducted further research that led to the discovery of the Apolaki Caldera. The Apolaki Caldera is about 150 km in diameter, making it the largest known Caldera in the world, and 90 km larger than the Yellowstone Caldera. Its monumental size suggests that the magnetic pulses associated with its formation have had a significant impact on the physics and chemistry in its region of the Pacific Ocean. The Apolaki Caldera is deemed unlikely to erupt, but Baretto has recommended further research to assess its environmental impacts. Calderas are formed when land collapses inwards into an empty magma chamber following a large eruption, creating significant geological change in the surrounding area.

In 2021, the Philippine House Committee on Science and Technology approved a house resolution to commend her for her discovery of the Apolaki Caldera.

Barretto is also a member of American Association of Petroleum Geologists and the Geological Society of the Philippines.
