= Pepe Barreto =

American radio personality

Pepe Barreto (born in Lima, Peru) was a community and entertainment reporter for KMEX-TV, Channel 34. With extensive experience in television and radio, Barreto, joined KMEX's news team, Noticias 34 in April 1993.

== Biography ==
Barretto moved from Peru to Los Angeles in 1972.

Barreto is known as the number one radio show personality in Los Angeles on KLVE, working on the station since 1985 and for a time attracting the largest radio audience in Los Angeles in the morning drivetime slot, with up to 7.4% market share.

Barreto also worked as a news reporter for KNBC-TV from 1976 to 1985, where he launched the station's first Spanish simulcast. Barreto received his undergraduate degree from Catholic University of Peru. In 2007, Barreto received a star on the Hollywood Walk of Fame in recognition of his work on KLVE. Pepe Barreto was born on 1947, in Lima, Peru
