= Miguel Barreto =

Argentine football striker

Personal information
- Full name: Miguel Alberto Barreto
- Date of birth: September 14, 1978 (age 48)
- Place of birth: Tostado, Argentina
- Position: Striker

Senior career*
Years	Team	Apps	(Gls)
1996–2000	Unión de Santa Fe	23	(4)
2000–2001	Atlético Tucumán		
2001–2002	Juventud Alianza		
2002–2003	Instituto de Córdoba		
2003–2004	Montevideo Wanderers		
2004–2005	Dinamo Tirana		
2006	Paykan		
2007	Unión de Santa Fe		
2007	Kitchee SC		
2008	Sportivo Las Parejas		
2009	Central Córdoba		
- * Club domestic league appearances and goals as of 3 May 2016

Miguel Alberto Barreto (born 14 September 1978 in Tostado, Santa Fe) is an Argentine football striker.
