= Barreto (footballer, born 1995) =

Brazilian footballer

Personal information
- Full name: Gustavo Bonatto Barreto
- Date of birth: 10 December 1995 (age 30)
- Place of birth: Nova Prata, Brazil
- Height: 1.81 m (5 ft 11 1/2 in)
- Position: Defensive midfielder

Team information
- Current team: América MG
- Number: 88

Youth career
- 2008–2009: Esportivo
- 2010–2013: Caxias
- 2013–2014: Criciúma

Senior career*
Years	Team	Apps	(Gls)
2014–2021	Criciúma	130	(1)
2018	→ Chapecoense (loan)	9	(0)
2019	→ Red Bull Brasil (loan)	11	(0)
2019–2020	→ Bragantino (loan)	43	(0)
2020–2021	→ Ponte Preta (loan)	20	(1)
2021	→ Botafogo (loan)	31	(0)
2022–2023	Botafogo	2	(0)
2022–2023	→ RWDM (loan)	20	(1)
2023–2024	Criciúma	8	(0)
2025	Avaí	16	(2)
2025–2026	Kyoto Sanga	8	(0)
2026–	América MG	11	(0)
Medal record
Representing Brazil
Men's Football
Pan American Games
Bronze medal – third place	2015 Toronto	Team competition
- * Club domestic league appearances and goals as of 10 September 2025

Gustavo Bonatto Barreto (born 10 December 1995), simply known as Barreto, is a Brazilian footballer who plays as a defensive midfielder for América MG.

== Club career ==
Born in Nova Prata, Rio Grande do Sul, Barreto graduated with Criciúma's youth setup, after having spells at Esportivo de Bento Gonçalves and Caxias. In 2010, aged only 15, he made his debuts as a senior with Nova Prata, in Copa FGF.

Barreto made his first team – and Série A – debut on 23 November 2014, starting in a 1–1 away draw against Flamengo.

In May 2018 Barreto was loaned to Chapecoense for the 2018 Campeonato Brasileiro Série A season. In 2019 he was loaned to Red Bull Brasil, becoming part of the Red Bull Bragantino team due to the merger with Clube Atlético Bragantino.

On 25 August 2022, Barreto joined RWDM in Belgium on loan.

== Honours ==
Red Bull Brasil

- Campeonato Paulista do Interior: 2019

Red Bull Bragantino

- Campeonato Brasileiro Série B: 2019
- Campeonato Paulista do Interior: 2020

Botafogo

- Campeonato Brasileiro Série B: 2021

RWD Molenbeek

- Challenger Pro League: 2022–23

Criciúma

- Recopa Catarinense: 2024
- Campeonato Catarinense: 2024

Avaí

- Campeonato Catarinense: 2025
