= UP Fighting Maroons women's volleyball =

Philippine college volleyball team

UP Fighting Maroons
- University: University of the Philippines
- Nickname: Fighting Maroons
- Founded: 1938
- Location: Diliman, Quezon City, Philippines
- Head coach: Fabio Menta
- Captain: Maria Dannica Celis

Main league
- League: UAAP
- Season 87 (2025): 6th

Championships
- UAAP: 8: 1938; 1947; 1949; 1951; 1962; 1977; 1979; 1982

The UP Fighting Maroons women's volleyball program is the women's collegiate varsity volleyball team of the University of the Philippines. Founded in the same year as the first season of its major league, the University Athletic Association of the Philippines (UAAP), the team was the first-ever champion of the said collegiate league.

== Current roster ==
UAAP Season 87 Roster
| No. | Name | PosIition. | Height | High School | Playing yr | Birth Date |
|---|---|---|---|---|---|---|
| 1 | Jaz Manguilimotan (R) | Setter | 5'8" | University of San Jose–Recoletos | 2nd | |
| 2 | Giesha Niccaleigh Capistrano | Libero | 5'4" | UP Integrated School | 3rd | |
| 3 | Alijah Marie Ysulan (R) | Libero | | Bacolod Tay Tung High School | 1st (LOA) | |
| 6 | Kianne Louise Olango (R) | Opposite Hitter | 5'8" | NU Nazareth School | 2nd | |
| 7 | Ma. Dannica Celis (C) | Middle Blocker | 5'10" | San Beda College Alabang | 4th (PRO) | July 7, 2001 (age 25) |
| 8 | Joan Marie Monares | Outside Hitter | 5'10" | Bacolod Tay Tung High School | 5th | January 28, 2002 (age 24) |
| 9 | Niña Ytang | Middle Blocker | 5'11" | Arcelo Memorial National High School | 5th | January 24, 2002 (age 24) |
| 10 | Irah Anika Jaboneta | Outside Hitter | 5'5" | De La Salle Santiago Zobel School | 5th | April 27, 2001 (age 25) |
| 11 | Kryzten Annikha Cabasac | Outside Hitter | 5'8" | Bacolod Tay Tung High School | 3rd (LOA) | |
| 12 | Kassandra Thalia Doering (F) | Middle Blocker | 6'0" (One and Done) | California State University, San Marcos | 1st^{1} | |
| 13 | Bienne Louis Bansil (R) | Middle Blocker | 5'11" | NU Nazareth School | 2nd | June 28, 2006 (age 20) |
| 17 | Julia Annika De Leon | Setter | | UP Integrated School | 2nd | |
| 19 | Denise Arichgrace Lauchengco (R) | Opposite Hitter | 5'8" | University of Perpetual Help System Laguna | 1st (*FEU) | |
| 20 | Yesha Noceja (R) | Outside Hitter | 5'8" | NU Nazareth School | 2nd | January 23, 2006 (age 20) |

| Position | Name |
|---|---|
| Head coach | (Philippines) Benson Bocboc (Miss You!) |
| Assistant coaches | (Philippines) Justine Dorog |
| Assistant coaches | (Philippines) Alohi Robins-Hardy |
| Assistant coaches | (Philippines) Zolo Ligot |
| Assistant coaches | (Philippines) Ron Adrian Medalla |
| Consultant | (Italy) Fabio Menta |

Legend

- C Team Captain
- F Foreign Student Athlete
- R Rookie
- S Suspended
- Injured

Notes:

- ^1 Doering is allowed to play only one season as she is already in her masteral degree.

== Training pool ==
This is the list of UP Fighting Maroons pool of players.

| Name | Position | Height | Birthday |
|---|---|---|---|
| (Philippines) Ashley Baradas | Setter | | |
| (Philippines) Frances Harriette De Guia | Setter | 1.70 m (5 ft 7 in) | |
| (Philippines) Samantha Denise Ildefonso | Setter | | |
| (Philippines) Kizzie Madriaga | Setter | 1.62 m (5 ft 4 in) | April 8, 2005 (age 21) |
| (Philippines) Mikaela Alexa Magsombol | Setter | 1.67 m (5 ft 6 in) | |
| (Philippines) Jelaica Faye Gajero | Opposite Hitter | 1.76 m (5 ft 9 in) | September 14, 2004 (age 21) |
| (Philippines) Julia Andres | Outside Hitter | | |
| (Philippines) Casiey Monique Dongallo | Outside Hitter | 1.76 m (5 ft 9 in) | June 13, 2005 (age 21) |
| (Philippines) Euricka Eslapor | Outside Hitter | | |
| (Philippines) Jenn Gould | Outside Hitter | 1.70 m (5 ft 7 in) | |
| (Philippines) Joanneesse Gabrielle Perez | Outside Hitter | 1.72 m (5 ft 8 in) | |
| (Nigeria) Sarah Otukugu Ali | Middle Blocker | 1.82 m (6 ft 0 in) | December 27, 2007 (age 18) |
| (Philippines) Jan Halley Baclay | Middle Blocker | 1.80 m (5 ft 11 in) | |
| (Philippines) Cassandra Ysabel Gamboa | Middle Blocker | | |
| (Philippines) Jenalyn Umayam | Middle Blocker | 1.72 m (5 ft 8 in) | January 26, 2006 (age 20) |
| (Philippines) Gracen Shamel Fernandez | Libero | 1.65 m (5 ft 5 in) | January 6, 2005 (age 21) |
| (Philippines) Jum Marie Grace Gayo | Libero | 1.60 m (5 ft 3 in) | |
| (Philippines) Lavhinia Jean Sasondoncillo | Libero | | |
| (Philippines) Marie Isabelle Tabbilos | Libero | | |

== Previous rosters ==
University Athletics Association of the Philippines

UAAP Season 86

UAAP Season 86 roster
| No. | Name | PosIition. | Height | Hometown | Birth date |
|---|---|---|---|---|---|
| 2 | Giesha Niccaleigh Capistrano | Libero | 5' 4" | | |
| 3 | Niña Ytang | Middle Blocker | 6'0" | | November 13, 2002 (age 23) |
| 4 | Mikaela Alexa Magsombol | Setter | 5'6" | | |
| 7 | Maria Dannica Celis | Middle Blocker | 5'10" | Muntinlupa City | July 7, 2004 (age 22) |
| 8 | Joan Marie Monares | Outside Hitter | 5'10" | Bacolod | January 28, 2002 (age 24) |
| 10 | Irah Anika Jaboneta | Outside Hitter | 5'5" | | April 27, 2001 (age 25) |
| 11 | Kyrzten Annikha Cabasac | Opposite Hitter | 5'8" | | |
| 12 | Jewel Hannah Ysabel Encarnacion | Outside Hitter | 5'7" | | December 22, 2000 (age 25) |
| 13 | Jan Halley Baclay | Middle Blocker | 5'11" | | |
| 16 | Stephanie Bustrillo | Opposite Hitter | 5'9" | Medellin, Cebu | January 7, 2001 (age 25) |
| 17 | Jum Marie Grace Gayo | Setter | 5'3" | Liloan, Cebu | |
| 18 | Abilaine Ann Goc (c) | Outside Hitter | 5'7" | | November 8, 1999 (age 26) |
| 19 | Frances Harriette De Guia | Setter | 5'7" | | |
| 20 | Jenn Gould | Outside Hitter | 5'7" | | |

| Position | Name |
|---|---|
| Head coach | (Philippines) Oliver Almadro |

Legend

- C Team Captain
- I Import
- DP Draft Pick
- R Rookie
- IN Inactive
- S Suspended
- FA Free Agent
- Injured

UAAP Season 85

UAAP Season 85 roster
| No. | Name | PosIition. | Height | Hometown | Birth date |
|---|---|---|---|---|---|
| 1 | Marianne Sotomil | Setter | 5' 4" | Bacolod | April 7, 2000 (age 26) |
| 3 | Niña Ytang | Middle Blocker | 6'0" | | November 13, 2002 (age 23) |
| 4 | Remelyn Altomea | Libero | 5'3" | | September 7, 1998 (age 28) |
| 6 | Ethan Lainne Arce | Middle Blocker | 5'9" | | June 6, 2001 (age 25) |
| 7 | Maria Dannica Celis | Middle Blocker | 5'10" | Muntinlupa City | July 7, 2004 (age 22) |
| 8 | Kirstin Louise Ojeda | Middle Blocker | 5'9" | Cebu | May 8, 2001 (age 25) |
| 9 | Theo Bea Bonafe | Setter | 5'8" | | December 31, 2001 (age 24) |
| 10 | Alyssa Bertolano | Outside Hitter | 5'7" | Bacolod | August 23, 2002 (age 24) |
| 11 | Euricka Eslapor | Outside Hitter | 5'6" | Cagayan de Oro | September 13, 2000 (age 25) |
| 12 | Jewel Hannah Ysabel Encarnacion (c) | Outside Hitter | 5'7" | | December 22, 2000 (age 25) |
| 14 | Abilaine Ann Goc | Outside Hitter | 5'7" | | November 8, 1999 (age 26) |
| 17 | Jum Marie Grace Gayo | Setter | 5'3" | Liloan, Cebu | |
| 21 | Kyrzten Annikha Cabasac | Opposite Hitter | 5'8" | | |

| Position | Name |
|---|---|
| Head coach | (Philippines) Shaq Delos Santos |

Legend

- C Team Captain
- I Import
- DP Draft Pick
- R Rookie
- IN Inactive
- S Suspended
- FA Free Agent
- Injured

UAAP Season 84

UAAP Season 84 roster
| No. | Name | PosIition. | Height | Hometown | Birth date |
|---|---|---|---|---|---|
| 1 | Marianne Sotomil | Setter | 5' 4" | Bacolod | April 7, 2000 (age 26) |
| 2 | Lorie Lyn Bernardo | Middle Blocker | 6'0" | Quezon City | August 1, 2000 (age 26) |
| 3 | Niña Ytang | Middle Blocker | 6'0" | | November 13, 2002 (age 23) |
| 4 | Remelyn Altomea | Libero | 5'3" | | September 7, 1998 (age 28) |
| 5 | Jaila Marie Atienza | Middle Blocker | 5'11" | San Fernando, Pampanga | November 9, 1999 (age 26) |
| 6 | Ethan Lainne Arce | Middle Blocker | 5'9" | | June 6, 2001 (age 25) |
| 8 | Joan Marie Monares | Outside Hitter | 5'10" | Bacolod | January 28, 2002 (age 24) |
| 10 | Alyssa Bertolano | Outside Hitter | 5'7" | Bacolod | August 23, 2002 (age 24) |
| 11 | Euricka Eslapor | Outside Hitter | 5'6" | Cagayan de Oro | September 13, 2000 (age 25) |
| 12 | Jewel Hannah Ysabel Encarnacion | Outside Hitter | 5'7" | | December 22, 2000 (age 25) |
| 16 | Stephanie Bustrillo | Opposite Hitter | 5'9" | Medellin, Cebu | January 7, 2001 (age 25) |
| 17 | Jum Marie Grace Gayo | Setter | 5'3" | Liloan, Cebu | |
| 18 | Irah Anika Jaboneta | Outside Hitter | 5'5" | | April 27, 2001 (age 25) |
| 19 | Alliah Bernise Omar | Opposite Hitter | 5'5" | | |
| R | Maria Dannica Celis | Middle Blocker | 5'10" | Muntinlupa City | July 7, 2004 (age 22) |
| R | Theo Bea Bonafe | Setter | 5'8" | Muntinlupa City | December 31, 2001 (age 24) |
| R | Kirstin Louise Ojeda | Middle Blocker | 5'9" | Cebu | May 8, 2001 (age 25) |
| R | Maria Celina Vergeire | Middle Blocker | 5'9" | Cebu | |

| Position | Name |
|---|---|
| Head coach | (Kenya) Godfrey Okumu |

Legend

- C Team Captain
- I Import
- DP Draft Pick
- R Rookie
- IN Inactive
- S Suspended
- FA Free Agent
- Injured

UAAP Season 82

The 14-women line-up of the Lady Fighting Maroons for UAAP Season 82 volleyball tournaments:

UAAP Season 82 roster
| No. | Pos. | Name | Ht. | High School | Hometown | Birth date |
|---|---|---|---|---|---|---|
| 1 | S | Marianne Sotomil | 5' 4" | Bacolod Tay Tung High School | Iloilo City, Iloilo | April 7, 2000 (age 26) |
| 2 | MB | Lorielyn Bernardo | 6' 0" | King's Montessori School | Quezon City, Metro Manila | August 1, 2000 (age 26) |
| 3 | MB | Maristela Genn Layug | 6' 0" | King's Montessori School | Quezon City, Metro Manila | November 13, 1998 (age 27) |
| 5 | MB | Jaila Marie Atienza | 5' 11" | Far Eastern University – Diliman | San Fernando, Pampanga | November 9, 1999 (age 26) |
| 9 | MB | Jessma Clarice Ramos | 5' 8" | | Bacolod, Negros Occidental | March 27, 1998 (age 28) |
| 10 | OH | Maria Lina Isabel Molde | 5' 7 1/2" | Hope Christian High School | Catmon, Cebu | October 18, 1998 (age 27) |
| 12 | OH | Jewel Hannah Ysabel Encarnacion | 5' 7" | De La Salle Santiago Zobel School | Laurel, Batangas | |
| 13 | L | Justine Dorog | 5' 5" | Hope Christian High School | Catmon, Cebu | March 13, 1998 (age 28) |
| 14 | OH | Euricka Eslapor | 5' 6" | First City Providential College | Cagayan de Oro, Misamis Oriental | September 13, 2000 (age 25) |
| 16 | S | Rose Mary Cailing | 5' 6" | Iligan City National High School | Iligan City, Lanao del Norte | February 10, 1998 (age 28) |
| 18 | OPP | Diana Mae Carlos | 5' 9" | Sta. Cruz Academy – Pampanga | Lubao, Pampanga | July 7, 1998 (age 28) |
| 19 | OH | Roselyn Rosier (c) | 5' 7" | Brent International School | Santa Rosa, Laguna | September 10, 1998 (age 27) |
| 20 | L | Jeanny Padilla | 5' 4" | Bacolod Tay Tung High School | Bacolod, Negros Occidental | |
| 24 | OPP | Stephanie Bustrillo | 5' 9" | Medellin National High School | Medellin, Cebu | |

| Position | Name |
|---|---|
| Head coach | (Kenya) Godfrey Okumu |
| Assistant coach | (Philippines) Jerrico Hubalde |
| Assistant coach | (Philippines) Maria Arielle Estrañero |
| Trainer | (Philippines) Emmanuel Liberato Papa |
| Therapist | (Philippines) Cyrus Dickson Cruz |
| Team Manager | (Philippines) Schedar Jocson |
| Student Manager | (Philippines) Mary Mirgie Bautista |
| Head Statistician | (Philippines) Abigail Lim |
| Utility 1 | (Philippines) Melvin Tonghap |
| Utility 2 | (Philippines) Servando Romo |

Legend

- C Team Captain
- I Import
- DP Draft Pick
- R Rookie
- IN Inactive
- S Suspended
- FA Free Agent
- Injured

UAAP Season 81

The 14-women line-up of the Lady Fighting Maroons for UAAP Season 81 volleyball tournaments:

| No. | Name | Position | Height | Weight | Spike | Block | Birthday |
|---|---|---|---|---|---|---|---|
| 1 | (Philippines) Marianne Sotomil | S | 1.63 m (5 ft 4 in) | 59 kg (130 lb) | 241 cm (7 ft 11 in) | 242 cm (7 ft 11 in) | April 7, 2000 (age 26) |
| 2 | (Philippines) Lorielyn Bernardo | MB | 1.83 m (6 ft 0 in) | 63 kg (139 lb) | 274 cm (9 ft 0 in) | 272 cm (8 ft 11 in) | August 1, 2000 (age 26) |
| 3 | (Philippines) Maristela Genn Layug | MB | 1.80 m (5 ft 11 in) | 62 kg (137 lb) | 279 cm (9 ft 2 in) | 277 cm (9 ft 1 in) | November 13, 1998 (age 27) |
| 4 | (Philippines) Remelyn Altomea | L | 1.60 m (5 ft 3 in) | 53 kg (117 lb) | 245 cm (96 in) | 239 cm (94 in) | September 7, 1999 (age 27) |
| 7 | (Philippines) Caryl Sandoval | OPP/OH | 1.70 m (5 ft 7 in) | 59 kg (130 lb) | 265 cm (8 ft 8 in) | 260 cm (8 ft 6 in) | August 22, 1996 (age 30) |
| 9 | (Philippines) Jessma Clarice Ramos | MB | 1.72 m (5 ft 8 in) | 59 kg (130 lb) | 273 cm (8 ft 11 in) | 271 cm (8 ft 11 in) | March 27, 1998 (age 28) |
| 10 | (Philippines) Maria Lina Isabel Molde | OH | 1.71 m (5 ft 7 in) | 60 kg (130 lb) | 273.5 cm (107.7 in) | 271.5 cm (106.9 in) | October 18, 1998 (age 27) |
| 11 | (Philippines) Marian Alisa Buitre | OPP | 1.73 m (5 ft 8 in) | 65 kg (143 lb) | 277 cm (109 in) | 275 cm (108 in) | December 5, 1996 (age 29) |
| 13 | (Philippines) Justine Dorog | OH | 1.65 m (5 ft 5 in) | 65 kg (143 lb) | 259 cm (8 ft 6 in) | 256 cm (8 ft 5 in) | March 13, 1998 (age 28) |
| 14 | (Philippines) Aieshalaine Gannaban | MB | 1.74 m (5 ft 9 in) | 62 kg (137 lb) | 271 cm (8 ft 11 in) | 267 cm (8 ft 9 in) | May 15, 1999 (age 27) |
| 15 | (Philippines) Mary Mirgie Bautista | L | 1.65 m (5 ft 5 in) | 56 kg (123 lb) | 256 cm (8 ft 5 in) | 252 cm (8 ft 3 in) | September 10, 1999 (age 26) |
| 17 | (Philippines) Maria Arielle Estrañero | S | 1.62 m (5 ft 4 in) | 59 kg (130 lb) | 265 cm (8 ft 8 in) | 267 cm (8 ft 9 in) | July 22, 1996 (age 30) |
| 18 | (Philippines) Diana Mae Carlos (c) | OPP/OH | 1.73 m (5 ft 8 in) | 70 kg (150 lb) | 271 cm (8 ft 11 in) | 270 cm (8 ft 10 in) | July 7, 1998 (age 28) |
| 19 | (Philippines) Roselyn Rosier | OH | 1.69 m (5 ft 7 in) | 59 kg (130 lb) | 273 cm (107 in) | 271.5 cm (106.9 in) | September 10, 1998 (age 27) |

Head coach:

- (Kenya) Godfrey Okumu

Assistant coach:

- (Philippines) Jose Mari Angulo

Trainer

- (Philippines) Wendel Miguel
- (Philippines) Joyce Antonniette Palad

Team manager

- (Philippines) Andrea Preciosa Lagman

Team Statistician

- (Philippines) Monica Ortiz

Physical Therapist

- (Philippines) Lea Diana Acantilado

Legend

- C Team Captain
- I Import
- DP Draft Pick
- R Rookie
- IN Inactive
- S Suspended
- FA Free Agent
- Injured

UAAP Season 80

The line-up of the Lady Fighting Maroons for UAAP Season 80 volleyball tournaments:

UP Lady Fighting Maroons – UAAP Season 80 Official Line Up
| Number | Name | Position | Height | Weight | Playing Year |
| 1 | (Philippines) (United States) Cynthia Maria Liclican | Setter | 5' 7" | | Rookie |
| 2 | (Philippines) Mae Angeli M. Basarte | Opposite Hitter | 5' 4 1/2" | 120 lbs. | 3rd |
| 3 | (Philippines) Maristela Genn G. Layug | Middle Blocker | 5' 11" | 130 lbs. | 3rd |
| 5 | (Philippines) Elise Patricia Siao | Libero | 5' 0" | | Rookie |
| 6 | (Philippines) Josette Thai | Libero | 5' 4" | 115 lbs. | Rookie |
| 9 | (Philippines) Jessma Clarice E. Ramos | Middle Blocker | 5' 10" | 125 lbs. | 2nd |
| 10 | (Philippines) Maria Lina Isabel M. Molde | Outside Hitter | 5' 7" | 120 lbs. | 3rd |
| 11 | (Philippines) Marian Alisa Buitre | Middle Blocker | 5' 8" | 140 lbs | 4th |
| 13 | (Philippines) Justine M. Dorog | Outside Hitter | 5' 4 1/2" | 120 lbs. | 3rd |
| 14 | (Philippines) Abigail Lim | Outside Hitter | 5' 4 1/2" | | Rookie |
| 16 | (Philippines) Rose Mary Cailing | Setter | 5' 6" | 120 lbs. | 2nd |
| 17 | (Philippines) Maria Arielle L. Estrañero | Setter | 5' 5" | 120 lbs. | 4th |
| 18 | (Philippines) Diana Mae M. Carlos (c) | Opposite Hitter | 5' 8" | 125 lbs. | 3rd |
| 19 | (Philippines) Roselyn Rosier | Opposite Hitter | 5' 10" | | Rookie |

Head coach

- (Kenya) Godfrey Okumu

Assistant coach

- (Philippines) Jose Mari Angulo

Team manager

- (Philippines) Andrea Preciosa Lagman

Doctor

- (Philippines)

Physical Therapist

- (Philippines) Lea Diana Acantilado

Legend

- C Team Captain
- I Import
- DP Draft Pick
- R Rookie
- IN Inactive
- S Suspended
- FA Free Agent
- Injured

UAAP Season 79

The 14-women line-up of the Lady Fighting Maroons for UAAP Season 79:

| Number | Name | Position | Height | Weight | Playing Year | High School |
|---|---|---|---|---|---|---|
| 2 | (Philippines) Mae Angeli M. Basarte | Defensive Specialist | 5' 4 1/2" | 120 lbs. | 2nd | Hope Christian High School |
| 3 | (Philippines) Maristela Genn G. Layug | Middle Blocker | 5' 11" | 130 lbs. | 2nd | Kings' Montessori School |
| 4 | (Philippines) Caryl D. Sandoval | Outside Hitter | 5' 8" | 125 lbs. | 2nd | Angelicum College |
| 8 | (Philippines) Katherine Adrielle R. Bersola | Middle Blocker | 5' 11" | 136 lbs | 5th | Makati Science High School |
| 9 | (Philippines) Jessma Clarice E. Ramos | Middle Blocker | 5' 10" | 125 lbs. | 1st | Trinity Christian School |
| 10 | (Philippines) Maria Lina Isabel M. Molde | Outside Hitter | 5' 7" | 120 lbs. | 2nd | Hope Christian High School |
| 11 | (Philippines) Marian Alisa Buitre | Middle Blocker | 5' 8" | 140 lbs | 3rd | St. Scholastica's College |
| 12 | (Philippines) Princess Ira Gaiser | Libero | 5' 1" | 115 lbs | 5th | St. Scholastica's College |
| 13 | (Philippines) Justine M. Dorog | Outside Hitter | 5' 4 1/2" | 120 lbs. | 2nd | Hope Christian High School |
| 14 | (Philippines) Aieshalaine Gannaban | Middle Blocker | 5' 9" | 125 lbs. | 2nd | Parang High School |
| 16 | (Philippines) Rose Mary Cailing | Setter | 5' 6" | 120 lbs. | 1st | Iligan City National High School |
| 17 | (Philippines) Maria Arielle L. Estrañero (c) | Setter | 5' 5" | 120 lbs. | 3rd | University of St. La Salle – Bacolod |
| 18 | (Philippines) Diana Mae M. Carlos | Opposite Hitter | 5' 8" | 125 lbs. | 2nd | Sta. Cruz Academy – Pampanga |
| 19 | (Philippines) Nicole Anne Z. Tiamzon | Opposite Hitter | 5' 6" | 125 lbs | 5th | Siena College of Taytay |

Head coach

- (Philippines) Jerry Yee

Assistant Coach(es)

- (Philippines) Katrina De Lara
- (Philippines) Rald Ricafort

Team manager

- (Philippines) Cecile Ronquillo

Doctor

- (Philippines)

Physical Therapist

- (Philippines) Ma. Crisanta P. Prieto
- C Team Captain
- I Import
- DP Draft Pick
- R Rookie
- IN Inactive
- S Suspended
- FA Free Agent
- Injured

Premier Volleyball League

2018 Premier Volleyball League Collegiate Conference

For the 2018 Premier Volleyball League Collegiate Conference:

| No. | Name | Position | Height | Weight | Spike | Block | Birthday |
|---|---|---|---|---|---|---|---|
| 1 | (Philippines) Jaila Marie Atienza | MB | 1.79 m (5 ft 10 in) | 63 kg (139 lb) | 244 cm (8 ft 0 in) | 246 cm (8 ft 1 in) | November 9, 1999 (age 26) |
| 2 | (Philippines) Lorielyn Bernardo | MB | 1.83 m (6 ft 0 in) | 63 kg (139 lb) | 274 cm (9 ft 0 in) | 272 cm (8 ft 11 in) | August 1, 2000 (age 26) |
| 3 | (Philippines) Maristela Genn Layug | MB | 1.80 m (5 ft 11 in) | 62 kg (137 lb) | 279 cm (9 ft 2 in) | 277 cm (9 ft 1 in) | November 13, 1998 (age 27) |
| 4 | (Philippines) Remelyn Altomea | L | 1.60 m (5 ft 3 in) | 53 kg (117 lb) | 245 cm (8 ft 0 in) | 239 cm (7 ft 10 in) | September 7, 1999 (age 27) |
| 5 | (Philippines) Nicole Ann Magsarile | OH | 1.70 m (5 ft 7 in) | 56 kg (123 lb) | 244 cm (8 ft 0 in) | 233 cm (7 ft 8 in) | March 8, 2000 (age 26) |
| 8 | (Philippines) Andreanna Pauleen Lagman | OH | 1.65 m (5 ft 5 in) | 60 kg (130 lb) | 257 cm (8 ft 5 in) | 242 cm (7 ft 11 in) | January 21, 2001 (age 25) |
| 9 | (Philippines) Jessma Clarice Ramos | MB | 1.72 m (5 ft 8 in) | 59 kg (130 lb) | 273 cm (8 ft 11 in) | 271 cm (8 ft 11 in) | March 27, 1998 (age 28) |
| 10 | (Philippines) Maria Lina Isabel Molde | OH | 1.73 m (5 ft 8 in) | 60 kg (130 lb) | 274 cm (9 ft 0 in) | 272 cm (8 ft 11 in) | October 18, 1998 (age 27) |
| 11 | (Philippines) Marian Alisa Buitre | OPP | 1.74 m (5 ft 9 in) | 65 kg (143 lb) | 277 cm (9 ft 1 in) | 275 cm (9 ft 0 in) | December 5, 1996 (age 29) |
| 14 | (Philippines) Aieshalaine Gannaban | MB | 1.74 m (5 ft 9 in) | 62 kg (137 lb) | 271 cm (8 ft 11 in) | 267 cm (8 ft 9 in) | May 15, 1999 (age 27) |
| 15 | (Philippines) Mary Mirgie Bautista | L | 1.65 m (5 ft 5 in) | 56 kg (123 lb) | 256 cm (8 ft 5 in) | 252 cm (8 ft 3 in) | September 10, 1999 (age 26) |
| 17 | (Philippines) Maria Arielle Estrañero (c) | S | 1.62 m (5 ft 4 in) | 59 kg (130 lb) | 265 cm (8 ft 8 in) | 267 cm (8 ft 9 in) | July 22, 1996 (age 30) |
| 19 | (Philippines) Roselyn Rosier | OPP | 1.69 m (5 ft 7 in) | 59 kg (130 lb) | 273 cm (8 ft 11 in) | 272 cm (8 ft 11 in) | September 10, 1998 (age 27) |
| 20 | (Philippines) Marianne Sotomil | S | 1.63 m (5 ft 4 in) | 59 kg (130 lb) | 241 cm (7 ft 11 in) | 242 cm (7 ft 11 in) | April 7, 2000 (age 26) |

Head coach:

- (Kenya) Godfrey Okumu

Assistant coach:

- (Philippines) Jose Mari Angulo

Trainer

- (Philippines) Wendel Miguel
- (Philippines) Joyce Antonniette Palad

Team manager

- (Philippines) Andrea Preciosa Lagman

Team Statistician

- (Philippines) Monica Ortiz

Physical Therapist

- (Philippines) Lea Diana Acantilado

Legend

- C Team Captain
- I Import
- DP Draft Pick
- R Rookie
- IN Inactive
- S Suspended
- FA Free Agent
- Injured

2017 Premier Volleyball League Collegiate Conference

The line-up of the Lady Fighting Maroons for Premier Volleyball League 1st Season Collegiate Conference:

| Number | Name | Position | Height | Weight |
|---|---|---|---|---|
| 1 | (Philippines) Vina Vera Alinas | Outside Hitter | 5' 6" | 125 lbs. |
| 2 | (Philippines) Mae Angeli M. Basarte | Opposite Spiker | 5' 4 1/2" | 120 lbs. |
| 3 | (Philippines) Maristela Genn G. Layug | Middle Blocker | 5' 11" | 130 lbs. |
| 5 | (Philippines) Remelyn Altomea G | Libero | 5' 6" | 120 lbs. |
| 6 | (Philippines) Josette Thai | Libero | 5' 4" | 115 lbs. |
| 8 | (Philippines) Lorie Lyn Bernardo G | Middle Blocker | 6' 0" | |
| 9 | (Philippines) Jessma Clarice E. Ramos | Middle Blocker | 5' 10" | 125 lbs. |
| 10 | (Philippines) Maria Lina Isabel M. Molde | Outside Hitter | 5' 7" | 120 lbs. |
| 11 | (Philippines) Marian Alisa Buitre | Middle Blocker | 5' 8" | 140 lbs |
| 12 | (Philippines) Caryl D. Sandoval | Outside Hitter | 5' 8" | 125 lbs |
| 13 | (Philippines) Justine M. Dorog | Outside Hitter | 5' 4 1/2" | 120 lbs. |
| 14 | (Philippines) Aieshalaine Gannaban | Middle Blocker | 5' 9" | 125 lbs. |
| 16 | (Philippines) Rose Mary Cailing | Setter | 5' 6" | 120 lbs. |
| 17 | (Philippines) Maria Arielle L. Estrañero | Setter | 5' 5" | 120 lbs. |
| 18 | (Philippines) Diana Mae M. Carlos (c) | Opposite Hitter | 5' 8" | 125 lbs. |
| 19 | (Philippines) Roselyn Rosier | Opposite Hitter | 5' 10" | |
| 20 | (Philippines) (United States) Cynthia Maria Escutin | Setter | 5' 7" | |

Head coach

- (Philippines) Jerry Yee

Assistant Coach(es)

- (Philippines) Katrina De Lara
- (Philippines) Rald Ricafort

Team manager

- (Philippines) Cecile Ronquillo

Doctor

- (Philippines)

Physical Therapist

- (Philippines) Ma. Crisanta P. Prieto

Legend

- C Team Captain
- I Import
- DP Draft Pick
- R Rookie
- G Guest Player
- IN Inactive
- S Suspended
- FA Free Agent
- Injured

2017 Premier Volleyball League Open Conference

The line-up of the Lady Fighting Maroons for Premier Volleyball League 1st Season Open Conference:

| Number | Name | Position | Height | Weight | Playing Year |
|---|---|---|---|---|---|
| 1 | (Philippines) Roselyn Rosier | Opposite Hitter | 5' 10" | | |
| 2 | (Philippines) Mae Angeli M. Basarte | Defensive Specialist | 5' 4 1/2" | 120 lbs. | 2nd |
| 3 | (Philippines) Maristela Genn G. Layug | Middle Blocker | 6' 0" | 130 lbs. | 2nd |
| 5 | (Philippines) Remelyn Altomea G | Libero | 5' 6" | 120 lbs. | |
| 8 | (Philippines) Lorie Lyn Bernardo G | Middle Blocker | 6' 0" | | |
| 9 | (Philippines) Jessma Clarice E. Ramos | Middle Blocker | 5' 8" | 125 lbs. | 1st |
| 10 | (Philippines) Maria Lina Isabel M. Molde | Outside Hitter | 5' 7 1/2" | 120 lbs. | 2nd |
| 11 | (Philippines) Caryl D. Sandoval | Outside Hitter | 5' 8" | 125 lbs. | 2nd |
| 13 | (Philippines) Justine M. Dorog | Outside Hitter | 5' 4 1/2" | 120 lbs. | 2nd |
| 14 | (Philippines) Aieshalaine R. Gannaban | Middle Blocker | 5' 9" | 125 lbs. | 2nd |
| 16 | (Philippines) Rose Mary Cailing | Setter | 5' 6" | 120 lbs. | 1st |
| 17 | (Philippines) Maria Arielle L. Estrañero | Setter | 5' 5" | 120 lbs. | 3rd |
| 18 | (Philippines) Diana Mae M. Carlos (c) | Opposite Hitter | 5' 8" | 125 lbs. | 2nd |
| 19 | (Philippines) Vina Vera Alinas | Libero | 5' 6" | 125 lbs. | |

Head coach

- (Philippines) Jerry Yee

Assistant Coach(es)

- (Philippines) Katrina De Lara
- (Philippines) Rald Ricafort

Team manager

- (Philippines) Cecile Ronquillo

Doctor

- (Philippines)

Physical Therapist

- (Philippines) Ma. Crisanta P. Prieto
- C Team Captain
- I Import
- DP Draft Pick
- G Guest Player
- R Rookie
- IN Inactive
- S Suspended
- FA Free Agent
- Injured

Philippine Super Liga

2018 PSL Invitational Cup

The line-up of the Lady Fighting Maroons for 2018 PSL Invitational Cup:

| No. | Name | Position | Height | Weight | Spike | Block | Birthday |
|---|---|---|---|---|---|---|---|
| 2 | (Philippines) Lorielyn Bernardo | MB | 1.83 m (6 ft 0 in) | 63 kg (139 lb) | 274 cm (108 in) | 272 cm (107 in) | August 1, 2000 (age 26) |
| 3 | (Philippines) Maristela Genn Layug | MB | 1.80 m (5 ft 11 in) | 62 kg (137 lb) | 279 cm (110 in) | 277 cm (109 in) | November 13, 1998 (age 27) |
| 4 | (Philippines) Remelyn Altomea | L | 1.60 m (5 ft 3 in) | 53 kg (117 lb) | 245 cm (96 in) | 239 cm (94 in) | September 7, 1999 (age 27) |
| 5 | (Philippines) Nicole Ann Magsarile | OH/OPP | 1.70 m (5 ft 7 in) | 56 kg (123 lb) | 244 cm (96 in) | 232.5 cm (91.5 in) | March 8, 2000 (age 26) |
| 8 | (Philippines) Andreanna Pauleen Lagman | OH | 1.70 m (5 ft 7 in) | 60 kg (130 lb) | 257 cm (101 in) | 242 cm (95 in) | January 21, 2001 (age 25) |
| 9 | (Philippines) Jessma Clarice Ramos | MB | 1.72 m (5 ft 8 in) | 59 kg (130 lb) | 273 cm (107 in) | 271 cm (107 in) | March 27, 1998 (age 28) |
| 10 | (Philippines) Maria Lina Isabel Molde | OH | 1.70 m (5 ft 7 in) | 60 kg (130 lb) | 273.5 cm (107.7 in) | 271.5 cm (106.9 in) | October 18, 1998 (age 27) |
| 11 | (Philippines) Marian Alisa Buitre | OH/OPP | 1.73 m (5 ft 8 in) | 65 kg (143 lb) | 277 cm (109 in) | 275 cm (108 in) | December 5, 1996 (age 29) |
| 12 | (Philippines) Abilaine Ann Goc | OH | 1.70 m (5 ft 7 in) | 60 kg (130 lb) | 245 cm (96 in) | 246 cm (97 in) | November 8, 1999 (age 26) |
| 13 | (Philippines) Justine Dorog | L | 1.64 m (5 ft 5 in) | 66 kg (146 lb) | 226 cm (89 in) | 214 cm (84 in) | March 13, 1998 (age 28) |
| 14 | (Philippines) Aieshalaine Gannaban | MB | 1.74 m (5 ft 9 in) | 62 kg (137 lb) | 271 cm (107 in) | 267 cm (105 in) | May 15, 1999 (age 27) |
| 16 | (Philippines) Rose Mary Cailing | S | 1.65 m (5 ft 5 in) | 65 kg (143 lb) | 267 cm (105 in) | 269 cm (106 in) | February 10, 1998 (age 28) |
| 17 | (Philippines) Maria Arielle Estrañero (c) | S | 1.62 m (5 ft 4 in) | 59 kg (130 lb) | 264.5 cm (104.1 in) | 267 cm (105 in) | July 22, 1996 (age 30) |
| 19 | (Philippines) Roselyn Rosier | OH/OPP | 1.69 m (5 ft 7 in) | 59 kg (130 lb) | 273 cm (107 in) | 271.5 cm (106.9 in) | September 10, 1998 (age 27) |

Head coach

- (Kenya) Godfrey Okumu

Assistant coach

- (Philippines) Jose Mari Angulo
- (Philippines) Joyce Antonniette Palad

Team manager

- (Philippines) Andrea Preciosa Lagman

Trainer

- (Philippines) Wendel Miguel

Physical Therapist

- (Philippines) Lea Diana Acantilado

Legend

- C Team Captain
- I Import
- DP Draft Pick
- R Rookie
- IN Inactive
- S Suspended
- FA Free Agent
- Injured

2018 PSL Collegiate Grand Slam

The 14-women line-up of the Lady Fighting Maroons for 2018 PSL Collegiate Grand Slam Conference:

| No. | Name | Position | Height | Weight | Spike | Block | Birthday |
|---|---|---|---|---|---|---|---|
| 2 | (Philippines) Lorielyn Bernardo | MB | 1.83 m (6 ft 0 in) | 63 kg (139 lb) | 274 cm (9 ft 0 in) | 272 cm (8 ft 11 in) | August 1, 2000 (age 26) |
| 3 | (Philippines) Maristela Genn Layug | MB | 1.80 m (5 ft 11 in) | 62 kg (137 lb) | 279 cm (9 ft 2 in) | 277 cm (9 ft 1 in) | November 13, 1998 (age 27) |
| 5 | (Philippines) Patricia Elise Siao | L | 1.52 m (5 ft 0 in) | 52 kg (115 lb) | 260 cm (8 ft 6 in) | 263 cm (8 ft 8 in) | September 5, 1998 (age 28) |
| 6 | (Philippines) Jessma Clarice Ramos | MB | 1.72 m (5 ft 8 in) | 59 kg (130 lb) | 273 cm (8 ft 11 in) | 271 cm (8 ft 11 in) | March 27, 1998 (age 28) |
| 7 | (Philippines) Andreanna Pauleen Lagman | OH | 1.65 m (5 ft 5 in) | 60 kg (130 lb) | 257 cm (8 ft 5 in) | 242 cm (7 ft 11 in) | January 21, 2001 (age 25) |
| 8 | (Philippines) Nicole Ann Magsarile | OH | 1.70 m (5 ft 7 in) | 56 kg (123 lb) | 244 cm (8 ft 0 in) | 233 cm (7 ft 8 in) | March 8, 2000 (age 26) |
| 11 | (Philippines) Caryl Sandoval | OPP | 1.70 m (5 ft 7 in) | 59 kg (130 lb) | 265 cm (8 ft 8 in) | 260 cm (8 ft 6 in) | August 22, 1996 (age 30) |
| 12 | (Philippines) Michaela Louise Osorio | OH | 1.62 m (5 ft 4 in) | 57 kg (126 lb) | 263 cm (8 ft 8 in) | 261 cm (8 ft 7 in) | June 7, 1997 (age 29) |
| 13 | (Philippines) Justine Dorog | OH | 1.65 m (5 ft 5 in) | 65 kg (143 lb) | 259 cm (8 ft 6 in) | 256 cm (8 ft 5 in) | March 13, 1998 (age 28) |
| 14 | (Philippines) Aieshalaine Gannaban | MB | 1.74 m (5 ft 9 in) | 62 kg (137 lb) | 271 cm (8 ft 11 in) | 267 cm (8 ft 9 in) | May 15, 1999 (age 27) |
| 15 | (Philippines) Mary Mirgie Bautista | L | 1.65 m (5 ft 5 in) | 56 kg (123 lb) | 256 cm (8 ft 5 in) | 252 cm (8 ft 3 in) | September 10, 1999 (age 26) |
| 17 | (Philippines) Maria Arielle Estrañero | S | 1.62 m (5 ft 4 in) | 59 kg (130 lb) | 265 cm (8 ft 8 in) | 267 cm (8 ft 9 in) | July 22, 1996 (age 30) |
| 18 | (Philippines) Diana Mae Carlos (c) | OPP/OH | 1.73 m (5 ft 8 in) | 70 kg (150 lb) | 271 cm (8 ft 11 in) | 270 cm (8 ft 10 in) | July 7, 1998 (age 28) |
| 20 | (Philippines) Marianne Sotomil | S | 1.63 m (5 ft 4 in) | 59 kg (130 lb) | 241 cm (7 ft 11 in) | 242 cm (7 ft 11 in) | April 7, 2000 (age 26) |

Head coach:

- (Kenya) Godfrey Okumu

Assistant coach:

- (Philippines) Jose Mari Angulo

Trainer

- (Philippines) Wendel Miguel
- (Philippines) Joyce Antonniette Palad

Team manager

- (Philippines) Andrea Preciosa Lagman

Team Statistician

- (Philippines) Monica Ortiz

Physical Therapist

- (Philippines) Lea Diana Acantilado

Legend

- C Team Captain
- I Import
- DP Draft Pick
- R Rookie
- IN Inactive
- S Suspended
- FA Free Agent
- Injured

Philippine University Games

2018 Philippine University Games

For the 2018 Philippine University Games:

| No. | Name | Position | Height | Weight | Playing Year | Birthday |
|---|---|---|---|---|---|---|
| 1 | (Philippines) Marianne Sotomil | Setter | 1.63 m (5 ft 4 in) | 59 kg (130 lb) | Rookie | April 7, 2000 (age 26) |
| 2 | (Philippines) Lorielyn Bernardo | Middle blocker | 1.83 m (6 ft 0 in) | 63 kg (139 lb) | Rookie | August 1, 2000 (age 26) |
| 4 | (Philippines) Remelyn Altomea | Libero | 1.60 m (5 ft 3 in) | 53 kg (117 lb) | Rookie | September 7, 1999 (age 27) |
| 5 | (Philippines) Jaila Marie Atienza | Middle blocker | 1.79 m (5 ft 10 in) | 63 kg (139 lb) | Rookie | November 9, 1999 (age 26) |
| 6 | (Philippines) Josette Thai | Libero | 1.62 m (5 ft 4 in) | 52 kg (115 lb) | 2nd | July 7, 1997 (age 29) |
| 7 | (Philippines) Alyssandra Gabrielle Ong | Middle blocker | 1.72 m (5 ft 8 in) | | Rookie | |
| 8 | (Philippines) Abilaine Ann Goc | Outside hitter | 1.70 m (5 ft 7 in) | 60 kg (130 lb) | Rookie | November 8, 1999 (age 26) |
| 9 | (Philippines) Jessma Clarice Ramos | Opposite hitter | 1.72 m (5 ft 8 in) | 59 kg (130 lb) | 3rd | March 27, 1998 (age 28) |
| 10 | (Philippines) Maria Lina Isabel Molde | Outside hitter | 1.73 m (5 ft 8 in) | 60 kg (130 lb) | 4th | October 18, 1998 (age 27) |
| 11 | (Philippines) Marian Alisa Buitre | Opposite hitter | 1.73 m (5 ft 8 in) | 65 kg (143 lb) | 5th | December 5, 1996 (age 29) |
| 12 | (Philippines) Thea Frances Mercader | Middle blocker | 1.73 m (5 ft 8 in) | | Rookie | |
| 13 | (Philippines) Justine Dorog | Outside hitter | 1.64 m (5 ft 5 in) | 66 kg (146 lb) | 4th | March 13, 1998 (age 28) |
| 16 | (Philippines) Rose Mary Cailing | Setter | 1.65 m (5 ft 5 in) | 65 kg (143 lb) | 3rd | February 10, 1998 (age 28) |
| 19 | (Philippines) Roselyn Rosier | Outside hitter | 1.69 m (5 ft 7 in) | 59 kg (130 lb) | 2nd | September 10, 1998 (age 27) |

Head coach

- (Kenya) Godfrey Okumu

Assistant coach

- (Philippines) Jose Mari Angulo
- (Philippines) Joyce Antonniette Palad

Team manager

- (Philippines) Andrea Preciosa Lagman

Trainer

- (Philippines) Wendel Miguel

Physical Therapist

- (Philippines) Lea Diana Acantilado

Legend

- C Team Captain
- I Import
- DP Draft Pick
- R Rookie
- IN Inactive
- S Suspended
- FA Free Agent
- Injured

== Coaches and Team Captains ==
- UAAP Volleyball Tournament

| Head Coach | Team Captain | Year | Season | Position |
| (Philippines) Jerry Yee | Nicole Ann Tiamzon | 2014-2015 | Season 77 | 6th place |
| (Philippines) Jerry Yee | Katherine Adrielle Bersola | 2015-2016 | Season 78 | 4th place |
| (Philippines) Jerry Yee | Maria Arielle Estrañero | 2017 | Season 79 | 5th place |
| (Kenya) Godfrey Okumu | Diana Mae Carlos | 2018 | Season 80 | 6th place |
| (Kenya) Godfrey Okumu | Diana Mae Carlos | 2019 | Season 81 | 5th place |
| (Kenya) Godfrey Okumu | Roselyn Rosier | 2020 | Season 82 | canceled due to COVID |
| (Kenya) Godfrey Okumu | Jewel Hannah Encarnacion | 2022 | Season 84 | 6th place |
| (Philippines) Ceseal Delos Santos | Jewel Hannah Encarnacion | 2023 | Season 85 | 7th place |
| (Philippines) Oliver Almadro | Abilainne Ann Goc | 2024 | Season 86 | 8th place |
| (Philippines) Benson Bocboc | Maria Danica Celis | 2025 | Season 87 | 6th place |
| (Italy) Fabio Menta | Joan Monares | 2026 | Season 88 | 6th place |

== Team honors ==
- UAAP Volleyball Tournament

| League | Year | Season | Position |
| UAAP Volleyball Championship | 1938–39 | Season 1 | Champions |
| UAAP Volleyball Championship | 1947–48 | Season 10 | Champions |
| UAAP Volleyball Championship | 1949–50 | Season 12 | Champions |
| UAAP Volleyball Championship | 1951–52 | Season 14 | Champions |
| UAAP Volleyball Championship | 1962–63 | Season 25 | Champions |
| UAAP Volleyball Championship | 1977–78 | Season 40 | Champions |
| UAAP Volleyball Championship | 1979–80 | Season 42 | Champions |
| UAAP Volleyball Championship | 1982–83 | Season 45 | Champions |
| UAAP Volleyball Championship | 1994–95 | Season 57 | 3rd place |
| UAAP Volleyball Championship | 1995–96 | Season 58 | 3rd place |
| UAAP Volleyball Championship | 1996–97 | Season 59 | 3rd place |
| UAAP Volleyball Championship | 1997–98 | Season 60 | 3rd place |

- Premier Volleyball League

| League | Year | Season | Position |
| Premier Volleyball League | 2015 SVL | Reinforced | 3rd place |
| Premier Volleyball League | 2016 SVL | Collegiate | 3rd place |
| Premier Volleyball League | 2018 PVL | Collegiate | Champions |

- Philippine Super Liga

| League | Year | Season | Position |
| Philippine Super Liga | 2018 | Collegiate | Champions |

- Founders' Cup – Philippines

| League | Year | Season | Position |
| Founders' Cup – Philippines | 2016 | Collegiate | Champions |
| Founders' Cup – Philippines | 2017 | Collegiate | Champions |

- PVF National Inter-Collegiate

| League | Year | Season | Position |
| PVF National Inter-Collegiate | 2016 | Collegiate | 3rd place |

- Philippine University Games

| League | Year | Season | Position |
| Philippine University Games | 2016 | Collegiate | 3rd place |

- Philippine National Games

| League | Year | Season | Position |
| Philippine National Games | 2015–16 | Collegiate | 3rd place |

== Individual honors ==
The UP Lady Maroons Volleyball Team – Individual Awards
| Tournament | Award | Player | Reference |
| UAAP Season 85 | 2nd Best Middle Blocker | (Philippines) Niña Ytang | |
| UAAP Season 86 | 2nd Best Middle Blocker | (Philippines) Niña Ytang | |
| 2018 Philippine Super Liga Collegiate | Most Valuable Player | (Philippines) Diana Mae Carlos | |
| 2018 Philippine Super Liga Collegiate | 1st Best Outside Spiker | (Philippines) Diana Mae Carlos | |
| 2018 Philippine Super Liga Collegiate | 1st Best Middle Blocker | (Philippines) Aieshalaine Gannaban | |
| 2018 Premier Volleyball League Collegiate | Finals' Most Valuable Player | (Philippines) Maria Lina Isabel Molde | |
| 2018 Premier Volleyball League Collegiate | 1st Best Outside Spiker | (Philippines) Maria Lina Isabel Molde | |
| 2018 Premier Volleyball League Collegiate | Conference Most Valuable Player | (Philippines) Maria Lina Isabel Molde | |
| 2018 Premier Volleyball League Collegiate | 2nd Best Middle Blocker | (Philippines) Aieshalaine Gannaban | |
| 2016 PVF National Inter-Collegiate | Best Setter | (Philippines) Mae Angeli Basarte | |
| 2016 PVF National Inter-Collegiate | Best Receiver | (Philippines) Elise Patricia Siao | |
| 2016 Shakey's V–League Collegiate | 1st Best Outside Spiker | (Philippines) Maria Lina Isabel Molde | |
| 2016 Shakey's V–League Open | 2nd Best Middle Blocker | (Philippines) Katherine Adrielle Bersola | |
| UAAP Season 78 | Rookie of the Year | (Philippines) Maria Lina Isabel Molde | |
| 2015 Shakey's V–League Reinforced | 1st Best Middle Blocker | (Philippines) Katherine Adrielle Bersola | |
| 2015 Shakey's V–League Reinforced | 2nd Best Middle Blocker | (Philippines) Sheena Mae Chopitea | |
| 2015–16 Philippine National Games | Best Libero | (Philippines) Princess Ira Gaiser | |
| 2015–16 Philippine National Games | Best Setter | (Philippines) Jewel Hannah Lai | |
| UAAP Season 76 | Best Blocker | (Philippines) Katherine Adrielle Bersola | |

== Records by season ==
Records starting UAAP Season 56

UP Fighting Lady Maroons
| UAAP Season | Year | Place | Notable Players | Lost to (finalist or higher rank) |
| 56 | 1993–1994 | 4th Place | | UST Growling Tigresses |
| 57 | 1994–1995 | 3rd Place | | UST Growling Tigresses |
| 58 | 1995–1996 | 3rd Place | | UST Growling Tigresses |
| 59 | 1996–1997 | 3rd Place | | FEU Lady Tamaraws |
| 60 | 1997–1998 | 3rd Place | | FEU Lady Tamaraws |
| 61 | 1998–1999 | 4th Place | | FEU Lady Tamaraws |
| 62 | 1999–2000 | 5th Place | | |
| 63 | 2000–2001 | 4th Place | | FEU Lady Tamaraws |
| 64 | 2001–2002 | 4th Place | | FEU Lady Tamaraws |
| 65 | 2002–2003 | 4th Place | | FEU Lady Tamaraws |
| 66 | 2003–2004 | 5th Place | | |
| 67 | 2004–2005 | 6th Place | | |
| 68 | 2005–2006 | 7th Place | | |
| 69 | 2006–2007 | 6th Place | | |
| 70 | 2007–2008 | 5th Place | Jed Montero | |
| 71 | 2008–2009 | 7th Place | Jed Montero, Carmela Lopez | |
| 72 | 2009–2010 | 6th Place | Carmela Lopez | |
| 73 | 2010–2011 | 8th Place | Angeli Araneta, Carmela Lopez, Amanda Isada | |
| 74 | 2011–2012 | 7th Place | Angeli Araneta, Amanda Isada | |
| 75 | 2012–2013 | 7th Place | Nicole Tiamzon, Princess Gaiser, Kathy Bersola, Karen Del Rosario, Ana Del Mundo, Tristine Badong, Princess Se, Ludy Tianzon, Liezchel Tiu, Hannah Mangulabnan, Alyana Abad, Aliyah Ong, Pam Legaspi, Arylle Magtalas | |
| 76 | 2013–2014 | 7th Place | Kathy Bersola (Best Blocker) Angeli Araneta, Nicole Tiamzon, Princess Gaiser, Arianne Ilustre, Julie Calugcug, Arylle Magtalas, Hannah Mangulabnan, Chester Tanika Ong, Princess Se, Sheeka Espinosa, Alyssa Gayle Layug | |
| 77 | 2014–2015 | 6th Place | Team Captain: Angeli Araneta; Nicole Tiamzon, Princess Gaiser, Kathy Bersola, Arianne Ilustre, Jewel Lai, Arylle Magtalas, Hannah Mangulabnan, Chester Tanika Ong, Monica Ortiz, Caryl Sandoval | |
| 78 | 2015–2016 | 4th Place | Isa Molde (Rookie of the Year) Team Captain: Kathy Bersola; Diana Mae Carlos, Nicole Tiamzon, Princess Gaiser, Marian Buitre, Vina Alinas, Mae Basarte, Sheena Chopitea, Justine Dorog, Arielle Estrañero, Aieshalaine Gannaban, Jewel Lai, Maristella Layug | Ateneo Lady Eagles |
| 79 | 2016–2017 | 5th Place | Team Captain: Arielle Estrañero; Isa Molde, Diana Mae Carlos, Nicole Tiamzon, Princess Gaiser, Kathy Bersola, Marian Buitre, Caryl Sandoval, Justine Dorog, Mae Basarte, Maristella Layug, Rose Cailing, Jessma Ramos, Aieshalaine Gannaban | |
| 80 | 2017–2018 | 6th Place | Team Captain: Diana Mae Carlos; Isa Molde, Marian Buitre, Arielle Estrañero, Justine Dorog, Mae Basarte, Maristella Layug, Rose Cailing, Jessma Ramos, Patricia Siao, Abigail Lim, Roselyn Rosier, Cynthia Liclican, Josette Thai | |
| 81 | 2018–2019 | 5th Place | Team Captain: Diana Mae Carlos; Isa Molde, Marian Buitre, Arielle Estrañero, Justine Dorog, Roselyn Rosier, Maristella Layug, Aieshalaine Gannaban, Jessma Ramos, Marianne Sotomil, Lorie Bernardo, Remelyn Altomea, Caryl Sandoval, Mirgie Bautista | |
| 82 | 2019–2020 | CANCELLED | Team Captain: Roselyn Rosier; Diana Mae Carlos, Isa Molde, Justine Dorog, Rose Cailing, Maristella Layug, Jessma Ramos, Marianne Sotomil, Lorie Bernardo, Jaila Atienza, Jeanny Padilla, Jewel Encarnacion, Euricka Eslapor, Stephanie Bustrillo | |

== Notable players ==
- Angeli Pauline Araneta

- UAAP Season 77 – Team Captain

- Mae Angeli Basarte

- 2016 PVF National Inter-Collegiate – Best Setter

- Katherine Adrielle Bersola

- UAAP Season 76 – Team Captain
- UAAP Season 76 – Best Blocker
- 2015 Shakey's V-League Season 12 Reinforced – 1st Best Middle Blocker
- 2016 Shakey's V-League Season 13 Open Conference – 2nd Best Middle Blocker
- 2018 Premier Volleyball League Open Conference – 2nd Best Middle Blocker
- 2019 Premier Volleyball League Reinforced Conference – 1st Best Middle Blocker

- Diana Mae Carlos

- UAAP Seasons 80 & 81 Team captain
- 2018 PSL Collegiate Grand Slam Conference – Most Valuable Player
- 2018 PSL Collegiate Grand Slam Conference – 1st Best Outside Spiker
- 2019 PVL Open Conference – Best Opposite Spiker
- 2022 PVL Open Conference – Best Opposite Spiker
- 2022 PVL Open Conference – Conference Most Valuable Player
- 2022 PVL Invitational Conference – Best Opposite Spiker
- 2022 PVL Invitational Conference – Conference Most Valuable Player
- 2022 Asian Women's Volleyball Cup national team member
- 2022 ASEAN Grand Prix national team member
- 2023 PVL 1st All-Filipino Conference – 1st Best Outside Spiker
- 2023 PVL 1st All-Filipino Conference – Conference Most Valuable Player
- 2023 PVL Invitational Conference – Best Opposite Spiker
- 2023 PVL 2nd All-Filipino Conference – Finals Most Valuable Player
- 2023 Southeast Asian Games national team member

- Sheena Mae Chopitea

- 2015 Shakey's V-League Season 12 Reinforced – 2nd Best Middle Blocker

- Justine Dorog

- 2014 Asian Youth Girls Volleyball national team member

- Jewel Hannah Ysabel Encarnacion

- UAAP Season 84 – Team Captain
- 2019 Thailand Sealect Tuna Volleyball Championship U-23 national team member

- Lorie Lyn Bernardo

- 2022 Asian Women's Volleyball Cup national team member

- Maria Arielle Estrañero

- UAAP Season 79 – Team Captain

- Princess Ira Gaiser

- 2015 Philippine National Games Volleyball Tournament – Best Libero

- Aieshalaine Gannaban

- 2018 PSL Collegiate Grand Slam Conference – 1st Best Middle Blocker
- 2018 Premier Volleyball League Collegiate – 2nd Best Middle Blocker

- Jewel Hannah Lai

- 2015 Philippine National Games Volleyball Tournament – Best Setter

- Maristela Gene Layug

- 2014 Asian Youth Girls Volleyball national team member

- Nicole Anne Magsarile

- 2014 Asian Youth Girls Volleyball national team member

- Maria Lina Isabel Molde

- UAAP Season 78 – Rookie of the Year
- 2016 Shakey's V-League Season 13 Collegiate – 1st Best Outside Spiker
- 2018 Premier Volleyball League Collegiate – 1st Best Outside Spiker
- 2018 Premier Volleyball League Collegiate – Conference Most Valuable Player
- 2018 Premier Volleyball League Collegiate – Finals Most Valuable Player
- 2014 Asian Youth Girls Volleyball national team member
- 2019 Philippines U-23 National Team – Team Captain

- Roselyn Rosier

- UAAP Season 82 – Team Captain
- 2014 Asian Youth Girls Volleyball national team member
- 2019 Thailand Sealect Tuna Volleyball Championship U-23 national team member

- Elise Patricia Siao

- 2016 PVF National Inter-Collegiate – Best Receiver

- Nicole Anne Tiamzon

- 2019 Premier Volleyball League Reinforced Conference – 1st Best Outside Spiker

== Former players ==
- Vina Vera Alinas (L)
- Angeli Pauline Araneta (MB)
- Katherine Adrielle Bersola (MB)
- Marian Alisa Buitre (OPP/MB)
- Pia Cayetano (OH)
- Maria Arielle Estrañero (S/L/OH)
- Princess Ira Gaiser (L)
- Jewel Hannah Lai (S)
- Alyssa Layug (MB)
- Carmela Lopez (OH)
- Hannah Mangulabnan (OH)
- Jed Montero (OH)
- Nicole Tiamzon (OH/OP/S)

*Legend: OH (Outside Hitter), OP (Opposite Hitter), MB (Middle Blocker), S (Setter), L (Libero)
