= Justine Dorog =

Filipina volleyball player

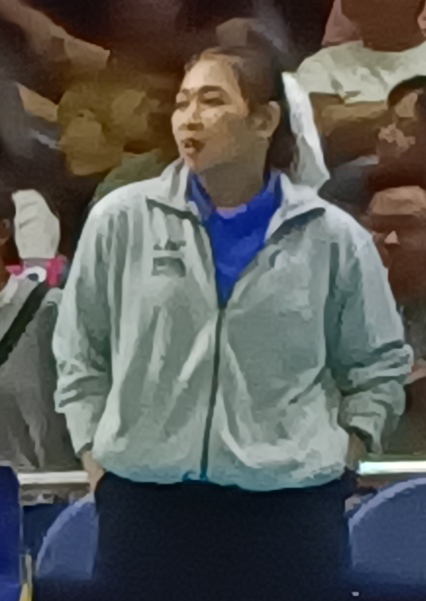
- Dorog in 2025

Personal information
- Full name: Justine M. Dorog
- Nickname: Just
- Nationality: Filipino
- Born: March 13, 1998 (age 28)
- Hometown: Catmon, Cebu, Philippines
- Height: 1.67 m (5 ft 6 in)
- Education: University of the Philippines-Diliman

Volleyball information
- Position: Assistant Coach
- Current club: Farm Fresh Foxies

Career
Years	Teams
2015–2020	UP Fighting Maroons
2019–2022	Chery Tiggo Crossovers
2023	Quezon City Gerflor Defenders
2023	Farm Fresh Foxies

National team
2014	Philippines (U17)
2019	Philippines (U23)

Justine Dorog (born March 13, 1998) is a Filipina professional volleyball player. She currently serves as assistant coach for the Farm Fresh Foxies volleyball team in the Premier Volleyball League.

== Personal life ==
Dorog was born and raised in Cebu Province and attended high school as an athlete at Hope Christian High School in Manila together with her cousin, Isa Molde. She studied Bachelor of Sports Science at the University of the Philippines-Diliman and played for the school's volleyball team.

== Career ==
Dorog was a member of the U17 Philippines national women's volleyball team in 2014, that finished 7th among 13 teams in the 2014 Asian Youth Girls Volleyball Championship. It defeated Australia and India while losing to China in straight sets in the Group C stage. In the Qualifying Round, it lost to Thailand while winning against New Zealand in 4 sets. In the Quarterfinals, it lost to South Korea. In the 5th–8th place playoffs, it lost to Kazakhstan in 5 sets. In the 7th place game, it won against New Zealand again. She joined the UP Lady Maroons for the UAAP Season 80 volleyball tournaments where they finished at 6th place. She is part of the UPWVT who won the championship in the 2018 PSL Collegiate Grand Slam Conference. She was also part of the line up who brought UP on their bronze medal in the UAAP Season 81 Beach Volleyball.

In 2019, Dorog became part of the Philippines women's national under-23 volleyball team pool. She signed with club team Foton Tornadoes Blue Energy, now Chery Tiggo 7 Pro Crossovers as a libero in the Philippine Super Liga. The team joined the Premier Volleyball League in 2021.

== Clubs ==
- (Philippines) UP Fighting Maroons (2015–2019)
- (Philippines) Chery Tiggo 7 Pro Crossovers (2019–2022)
- (Philippines) Quezon City Gerflor Defenders (2023)
- (Philippines) Farm Fresh Foxies (2023)

== Awards ==
=== Collegiate ===
- 2015 Shakey's V-League 12th Season Reinforced Open Conference - Bronze medal, with UP Fighting Lady Maroons
- 2016 Shakey's V-League 13th Season Reinforced Open Conference - Bronze medal, with UP Fighting Lady Maroons
- 2016 Founders' Cup Philippines - Champion, with UP Fighting Lady Maroons
- 2017 Founders' Cup Philippines - Champion, with UP Fighting Lady Maroons
- 2018 PSL Collegiate Grand Slam Conference - Champion, with UP Fighting Lady Maroons
- 2018 UAAP Season 81 Beach Volleyball - Bronze medal, with UP Fighting Lady Maroons
- 2018 UniGames Indoor Volleyball - Bronze medal, with UP Fighting Lady Maroons
