= 2016 Shakey's V-League Collegiate Conference =

Shakey's V-League 13th Season Collegiate Conference
- League: Shakey's V-League
- Sport: Volleyball
- Teams: 10
- TV partner: ABS-CBN Sports+Action

Final
- Champions: National University
- Runners-up: Ateneo de Manila University
- Finals MVP: Jasmine Nabor

Shakey's V-League seasons
- ← 13, Open 13, Reinforced →

The 2016 Shakey's V-League Collegiate Conference was the 27th conference of the Shakey's V-League and the second conference of the 2016 season. The conference was started on July 30, 2016 at the Ynares Sports Arena with the first two games of the conference. Majority of the games will be held at the Philsports Arena, Pasig.

There are ten (10) competing teams (5 from UAAP, 4 from NCAA and 1 from ISAA) who will split into two brackets for this conference, which served as a pre-season tournament for collegiate leagues.

ABS-CBN Sports+Action is covering the games live on television.

== Participating teams ==
Abbr.	Group A
ADM	Ateneo de Manila University Lady Eagles
NUI	National University Lady Bulldogs
UPH	University of Perpetual Help System DALTA Lady Altas
SSC	San Sebastian College – Recoletos de Manila Lady Stags
TIP	Technological Institute of the Philippines Lady Engineers

Abbr.	Group B
CSB	College of Saint Benilde Lady Blazers
FEU	Far Eastern University Lady Tamaraws
SBC	San Beda College Red Lionesses
UPD	University of the Philippines Lady Maroons
UST	University of Santo Tomas Tigresses

== Line-ups ==
=== Group A ===
Ateneo Lady Eagles
No.	Player name	Position
3	MORENTE, Michelle (c)	OPP
4	LO, Jennelle Marie	L
5	GASTON, Pauline	OH
6	LAVITORIA, Jamie	S
7	TAN, Gizelle	L
8	DE LEON, Bea	MH
9	GOPICO, Ana	MH
10	ABELLA, Bettina	MH
11	WONG, Deanna	S
12	MORADO, Jia	S
14	SAMONTE, Jules	MH
15	MARAGUINOT, Jhoana	OH
18	GEQUILLANA, Kim	OH
	BUNDIT, Anusorn "Tai"	HC

NU Lady Bulldogs
No.	Player name	Position
3	SANTIAGO, Alyja Daphne (c)	OH
4	NABOR, Jasmine	S
5	SATO, Risa	MH
6	DOROMAL, Roma Joy	OH
7	ABERIN, Larnie	
8	CHAVEZ, Joni	
9	URDAS, Aiko	OH
11	DORIA, Rosielyn	MH
13	VALDEZ, Gayle	L
14	SINGH, Jorelle	OH
15	PARAN, Audrey	OPP
	GORAYEB, Roger	HC

Perpetual Help Lady Altas
No.	Player name	Position
1	TRIPOLI, Bianca	
2	IMBO, Cindy	
3	BRAVO, Coleen (c)	MH
4	SUYAT, Jamela	
5	CLEMENTE, Lourdes	MH
6	VERSOZA, Jowie	
7	MARCOS, Aryana	
8	MEDALLA, Marijo	L
9	GUAL, Necelle Mae	S
10	SANGGALANG, Alyssa	
12	UMANDAL, Shyra Mae	
13	GAYO, Jan Marie	L
14	ROSAL, Jhonna	
18	RATERTA, Reynelen	G
	ACAYLAR, Sammy	HC

San Sebastian Lady Stags
No.	Player name	Position
1	PINGOY, Jeremae	
3	CRUZ, Charmaine	
5	SOLTONES, Grethcel (c)	OH
6	SANTOS, Daureen	
7	TIANGCO, Julie Anne	
8	DALISAY, Nikka Mariel	
9	GUILLEMA, Vira	S
12	VILLEGAS, Katherine	MH
13	OLIVEROS, Iris	
14	AMPONIN, Danna	
15	ENCARNACION, Dangie	
16	EROA, Alyssa	L
17	STA. Rita, Joyce	MH
18	LIM, Denice	
	MALAZO, Clint	HC

TIP Lady Engineers
No.	Player name	Position
1	ESPINOSA, Sheeka (c)	
2	AGUSTIN, Andrea	
4	PAAT, Mylene	G
5	ROSALES, Alexandra	
6	MATURAN, Eden Faith	
7	ESPINOSA, Sheena	
8	FIDEL, Rochelle	
9	SOLIVA, Bhetaney	L
10	GUANTERO, Lea Mae	
11	LAYUG, Alyssa	MH
14	YAMZON, Eliza Ann	
15	OPENIANO, Faye	L
16	MABAYAO, Eunice	
17	SAET, Relea Ferina	G
	PARIL, Achilles	HC

=== Group B ===
CSB Lady Blazers
No.	Player name	Position
1	ENGINCO, Angela	
3	AUSTERO, Rachel	
4	VENTURA, Diane	
5	UMALI, Chelsea	
6	PANAGA, Jeanette (c)	MH
7	TORRES, Melanie	L
8	CARDIENTE, Pauline	
9	SANTILLAN, Chelsea	
11	LIM, Christine	L
12	DOLLORITO, Ellaine	
13	NAVARRO, Janine	G
15	CHENG, Djanel Welch	G
16	DAGUIL, Ariane	
17	MUSA, Ranya	MH
	CARIÑO, Michael	HC

FEU Lady Tamaraws
No.	Player name	Position
1	HERNANDEZ, Carlota	OH
2	PONS, Bernadeth	OH
3	VILLAREAL, Jeanette	MH
4	GUINO-O, Heather	OH
5	DUREMDES, Ria	L
7	REBLEZA, Justin Andrea	
8	CAYUNA, Maria Angelica	S
9	PALMA, Remy (c)	MH
11	ATIENZA, Kyla	L
12	NEGRITO, Kyle	S
13	DOMINGO, Celine	MH
14	CARANDANG, Czarina	MH
15	MALABANAN, Jerili	MH
16	BASAS, Toni Rose	OH
	DELOS SANTOS, Cesael	HC

San Beda Lady Red Spikers
No.	Player name	Position
1	CUEVAS, Rebecca (c)	
3	EULALIO, Wenneth	G
4	AMADOR, Criselle	
5	RACRAQUIN, Daryl	L
6	ZAMUDIO, Deborah	L
7	CERDENA, Noheli	
8	MARCIANO, Janine	G
9	VIRAY, Nieza	OH
10	ESPIRITU, Satrriani	L
11	DOMINGO, George	
14	MANUEL, Daisy	
15	GARCIA, Pham	
16	VIRAY, Jiezela	OPP
18	RACRAQUIN, Cesca	OH
	GAVINO, Nemesio	HC

UP Fighting Lady Maroons
No.	Player name	Position
2	BASARTE, Mae Angeli	S
3	LAYUG, Maristela	MH
6	SANDOVAL, Caryl	OH
8	BERSOLA, Kathy (c)	MH
9	RAMOS, Jessma Clarice	MH
10	MOLDE, Isa	OH
11	BUITRE, Marian	MH/OH
12	GAISER, Princess	L
11	LIM, Christine	
13	DOROG, Justine	OH
14	GANNABAN, Aiesha	MH
16	CAILING, Rose Mary	S
17	ESTRANERO, Arielle	L
18	CARLOS, Diana	MH
19	TIAMZON, Nicole	OH/S
	YEE, Jerry	HC

UST Golden Tigresses
No.	Player name	Position
2	PACRES, Mary	OPP
4	POLLENTES, Catherine	L
5	SANDOVAL, Carla	OH
6	MANGULABNAN, Maji	G
7	BICAR, Alina	S
8	LAURE, Ejiya	G
9	LAURE, Ennajie	OH
11	RASMO, Pat	L
12	DIZON, Mildred	
13	GUTIERREZ, Jem	OH
14	FRANCISCO, Christine	MH
15	MENESES, Ria	MH
16	RONDINA, Cherry Anne (c)	OH
17	PALEC, Shannen	MH
18	VIRAY, Caitlin	OPP
	REYES, Jr., Emilio "Kung Fu"	HC

Legend
G	Guest Player
S	Setter
MH	Middle Hitter
OH	Outside Hitter
OP	Opposite Hitter
L	Libero
(c)	Team Captain
HC	Head coach

== Format ==
The conference format as it follows:

- Preliminaries

- Single round robin preliminary

- Quarterfinals

- Top three teams from each group after preliminary round will enter the quarterfinal play-off round

- Semifinals

- Top four teams after quarterfinals round will enter the semifinals round
- They will compete against each other in a best-of-three series as follows: Rank 1 vs Rank 4 and Rank 2 vs Rank 3.

- Finals

- Best-of-three series for the Final and Bronze matches

Players who are eligible to play in the conference are those who have been competed in a collegiate league, enrolled freshmen, and transferees who have completed their residency period. All teams are mandatory to add two guest players for each squad, including players who are still undergoing residency period.

== Preliminary round ==
=== Group A ===
Pos	Team	Pld	W	L	Pts	SW	SL	SR	SPW	SPL	SPR	Qualification
1	National University	4	3	1	9	9	4	2.250	309	275	1.124	Quarterfinals
2	San Sebastian College–Recoletos	4	3	1	9	9	5	1.800	316	313	1.010	Quarterfinals
3	Ateneo de Manila University	4	2	2	6	8	6	1.333	329	284	1.158	Quarterfinals
4	Technological Institute of the Philippines	4	2	2	6	6	5	1.200	322	320	1.006	Eliminated
5	University of Perpetual Help System DALTA	4	0	4	0	1	12	0.083	243	327	0.743	Eliminated

Source: The V-League

==== Match results ====
All times are Philippine Standard Time (UTC+08:00)

Date	Time		Score		Set 1	Set 2	Set 3	Set 4	Set 5	Total	Report
July 30	18:30	San Sebastian Lady Stags	3–0	Perpetual Lady Altas	27–25	25–22	25–22			77–69	
August 1	18:30	Ateneo Lady Eagles	2–3	TIP Lady Engineers	24–26	25–14	21–25	25–18	12–15	107–98	
August 3	18:30	NU Lady Bulldogs	3–0	San Sebastian Lady Stags	25–22	29–27	25–21			79–70	
August 6	16:30	San Sebastian Lady Stags	3–0	Ateneo Lady Eagles	25–23	25–22	25–23			75–68	
August 8	16:30	TIP Lady Engineers	0–3	NU Lady Bulldogs	17–25	17–25	18–25			52–75	
August 10	18:30	UP Lady Maroons	0–3	TIP Lady Engineers	16–25	13–25	15–25			44–75	
August 15	16:30	TIP Lady Engineers	2–3	San Sebastian Lady Stags	22–25	25–13	18–25	25–16	7–15	97–94	
August 15	18:30	Ateneo Lady Eagles	3–0	Perpetual Lady Altas	27–25	25–13	25–16			77–54	
August 17	16:30	UP Lady Maroons	1–3	NU Lady Bulldogs	10–25	25–21	16–25	25–27		76–98	
August 20	18:30	NU Lady Bulldogs	0–3	Ateneo Lady Eagles	15–25	25–27	17–25			57–77	

==== Playoff for Quarterfinals ====
Date	Time		Score		Set 1	Set 2	Set 3	Set 4	Set 5	Total	Report
August 21	18:00	Ateneo Lady Eagles	3–1	TIP Lady Engineers	16–25	25–16	25–20	25–16		91–77	

=== Group B ===
Pos	Team	Pld	W	L	Pts	SW	SL	SR	SPW	SPL	SPR	Qualification
1	Far Eastern University	4	4	0	12	12	3	4.000	356	268	1.328	Quarterfinals
2	University of the Philippines Diliman	4	3	1	9	11	5	2.200	349	312	1.119	Quarterfinals
3	University of Santo Tomas	4	2	2	8	8	8	1.000	350	336	1.042	Quarterfinals
4	San Beda College	4	1	3	3	5	9	0.556	274	327	0.838	Eliminated
5	De La Salle–College of Saint Benilde	4	0	4	0	1	12	0.083	239	325	0.735	Eliminated

Source: The V-League

==== Match results ====
All times are Philippine Standard Time (UTC+08:00)

Date	Time		Score		Set 1	Set 2	Set 3	Set 4	Set 5	Total	Report
July 30	16:30	UP Lady Maroons	3–0	San Beda Red Lionesses	25–20	25–17	25–20			75–57	
August 1	16:30	Benilde Lady Blazers	0–3	FEU Lady Tamaraws	16–25	18–25	18–25			52–75	
August 3	16:30	San Beda Red Lionesses	1–3	UST Growling Tigresses	25–27	18–25	25–20	18–25		86–97	
August 6	18:30	UST Growling Tigresses	3–1	Benilde Lady Blazers	25–20	25–17	25–27	25–17		100–81	
August 8	18:30	Benilde Lady Blazers	0–3	UP Lady Maroons	20–25	12–25	17–25			49–75	
August 10	16:30	FEU Lady Tamaraws	3–1	San Beda Red Lionesses	23–25	25–6	25–11	25–14		98–56	
August 13	16:30	San Beda Red Lionesses	3–0	Benilde Lady Blazers	25–16	25–21	25–20			75–57	
August 13	18:30	UST Growling Tigresses	2–3	UP Lady Maroons	19–25	25–13	23–25	25–16	6–15	98–94	
August 17	18:30	FEU Lady Tamaraws	3–0	UST Growling Tigresses	25–14	25–18	25–23			75–55	
August 20	16:30	UP Lady Maroons	2–3	FEU Lady Tamaraws	25–27	22–25	25–18	25–23	8–15	105–108	

== Quarterfinals ==
Pos	Team	Pld	W	L	Pts	SW	SL	SR	SPW	SPL	SPR	Qualification
1	Far Eastern University	5	4	1	12	14	5	2.800	432	378	1.143	Semifinals
2	National University	5	4	1	11	12	6	2.000	417	392	1.064	Semifinals
3	University of the Philippines Diliman	5	3	2	9	12	10	1.200	473	451	1.049	Semifinals
4	Ateneo de Manila University	5	2	3	6	7	9	0.778	360	356	1.011	Semifinals
5	San Sebastian College–Recoletos	5	2	3	6	7	10	0.700	357	404	0.884	Eliminated
6	University of Santo Tomas	5	0	5	1	3	15	0.200	356	414	0.860	Eliminated

Source: The V-League

Date	Time		Score		Set 1	Set 2	Set 3	Set 4	Set 5	Total	Report
August 22	16:00	UST Growling Tigresses	0–3	NU Lady Bulldogs	21–25	27–29	13–25			61–79	
August 24	16:00	San Sebastian Lady Stags	3–1	UST Growling Tigresses	25–20	25–18	16–25	25–19		91–82	
August 24	18:00	NU Lady Bulldogs	3–2	FEU Lady Tamaraws	25–17	24–26	14–25	25–18	15–11	103–97	
August 27	16:00	FEU Lady Tamaraws	3–0	San Sebastian Lady Stags	27–25	25–20	25–11			77–56	
August 27	18:00	Ateneo Lady Eagles	1–3	UP Lady Maroons	18–25	25–14	20–25	18–25		81–89	
August 29	16:00	UP Lady Maroons	1–3	NU Lady Bulldogs	25–23	19–25	24–26	19–25		87–99	
August 29	18:00	UST Growling Tigresses	0–3	Ateneo Lady Eagles	22–25	19–25	19–25			60–75	
August 31	16:00	San Sebastian Lady Stags	1–3	UP Lady Maroons	17–25	25–23	5–25	18–25		65–98	
August 31	18:00	Ateneo Lady Eagles	0–3	FEU Lady Tamaraws	18–25	19–25	22–25			59–75	

=== Playoff for Semifinals ===
Date	Time		Score		Set 1	Set 2	Set 3	Set 4	Set 5	Total	Report
September 3	18:00	Ateneo Lady Eagles	3–0	San Sebastian Lady Stags	25–22	25–23	25–17			75–62	

== Semifinals ==
- Ranking is based from the quarter-finals round.
- All series are best-of-3

Semifinals
1	FEU Lady Tamaraws	0	1	–
4	Ateneo Lady Eagles	3	3	–
2	NU Lady Bulldogs	3	3	–
3	UP Lady Maroons	1	1	–

Finals
Ateneo Lady Eagles	2	2	–
NU Lady Bulldogs	3	3	–
Third place
FEU Lady Tamaraws	3	1	–
UP Lady Maroons	2	3	–

=== Rank 1 vs Rank 4 ===
Date	Time		Score		Set 1	Set 2	Set 3	Set 4	Set 5	Total	Report
September 5	16:00	FEU Lady Tamaraws	0–3	Ateneo Lady Eagles	14–25	26–28	22–25			62–78	
September 7	18:00	Ateneo Lady Eagles	3–1	FEU Lady Tamaraws	25–23	24–26	25–19	25–23		99–91	

=== Rank 2 vs Rank 3 ===
Date	Time		Score		Set 1	Set 2	Set 3	Set 4	Set 5	Total	Report
September 5	18:00	NU Lady Bulldogs	3–1	UP Lady Maroons	25–23	25–23	23–25	26–24		99–95	
September 7	16:00	UP Lady Maroons	1–3	NU Lady Bulldogs	25–21	10–25	25–27	21–25		81–98	

== Finals ==
=== Battle for Bronze ===
Date	Time		Score		Set 1	Set 2	Set 3	Set 4	Set 5	Total	Report
September 12	16:00	FEU Lady Tamaraws	3–2	UP Lady Maroons	25–23	25–23	21–25	21–25	15–9	107–105	
September 14	16:00	UP Lady Maroons	3–1	FEU Lady Tamaraws	25–18	25–21	32–34	25–21		107–94	

=== Championship ===
Date	Time		Score		Set 1	Set 2	Set 3	Set 4	Set 5	Total	Report
September 12	18:00	NU Lady Bulldogs	3–2	Ateneo Lady Eagles	25–21	19–25	23–25	25–18	18–16	110–105	
September 14	18:00	Ateneo Lady Eagles	2–3	NU Lady Bulldogs	25–19	18–25	22–25	25–21	4–15	94–105	

== Individual awards ==
Award		Name/Team
MVP		Alyja Daphne "Jaja" Santiago (NU)
Finals MVP		Jasmine Nabor (NU)
Best Outside Spiker	1st:	Maria Lina Isabel "Isa" Molde (UP)
Best Outside Spiker	2nd:	Jorelle Singh (NU)
Best Middle Blocker	1st:	Alyja Daphne "Jaja" Santiago (NU)
Best Middle Blocker	2nd:	Mary Remy Joy Palma (FEU)
Best Opposite Spiker		Toni Rose "Chin" Basas (FEU)
Best Setter		Julia Melissa "Jia" Morado (ADMU)
Best Libero		Ma. Gizelle Jessica Tan (ADMU)

== Final standings ==
Rank	Team
1st place, gold medalist(s)	National University
2nd place, silver medalist(s)	Ateneo de Manila University
3rd place, bronze medalist(s)	University of the Philippines
4	Far Eastern University
5	San Sebastian College – Recoletos de Manila
6	University of Santo Tomas
7	Technological Institute of the Philippines
8	San Beda College
9	University of Perpetual Help System DALTA
10	College of Saint Benilde

== See also ==
- Spikers' Turf 2nd Season Collegiate Conference
- 2016 PSL All-Filipino Conference
