= Kia Forte (volleyball) =

Philippine women's volleyball club

- Full name: Kia Forte
- Short name: Kia
- Founded: 2015
- Dissolved: 2015
- Captain: Maria Angeli Tabaquero (UST)
- League: Shakey's V-League
- Season 12, Reinforced Open Conference: 5th Place

Uniforms
Home	Away

Kia Forte was a women's volleyball club team in the Shakey's V-League. The club was owned by the Columbian Autocar Corporation, the exclusive distributor of Kia Motors vehicles in the Philippines.

It was the second sports franchise of Columbian Autocar Corporation, next to its PBA basketball team.

== Roster ==
For the Shakey's V-League 12th Season Reinforced Open Conference:

Kia Forte
Number	Player	Position	Height	School
1	(Philippines) (United States) Alexa Micek	Open Hitter	1.76 m (5 ft 9 in)	North Carolina State University
3	(Philippines) Danielle Michiko Castañeda	Middle Hitter		University of the Philippines
4	(Philippines) Carmina Aganon	Opposite Spiker	1.71 m (5 ft 7 in)	National University
6	(Philippines) Shiela Marie Pineda	Open Hitter	1.63 m (5 ft 4 in)	Adamson University
7	(Philippines) Wenneth Eulalio	Open Hitter	1.78 m (5 ft 10 in)	Far Eastern University
8	(Philippines) Faye Janelle Guevarra	Middle Hitter	1.71 m (5 ft 7 in)	Adamson University
10	(Philippines) Felicia Marie Cui	Libero	1.63 m (5 ft 4 in)	Ateneo de Manila University
11	(Philippines) Angelica Legacion	Setter	1.63 m (5 ft 4 in)	Arellano University
12	(Philippines) Jennylyn Reyes	Libero	1.60 m (5 ft 3 in)	National University
14	(Philippines) Khristine Basco	Open Hitter	1.77 m (5 ft 10 in)	Colegio de San Juan de Letran
15	(Philippines) Maria Angeli Tabaquero (c)	Open Hitter	1.74 m (5 ft 9 in)	University of Santo Tomas
16	(Philippines) Alyssa Layug	Open Hitter		Technological University of the Philippines
17	(Philippines) Relea Ferina Saet	Setter	1.65 m (5 ft 5 in)	De La Salle University
18	(Philippines) Kathlene Magsumbol	Open Hitter		FEU

Coaching staff

- Head Coach:
  (Philippines) Oliver Almadro
- Assistant Coach(s):
  (Philippines) Mario Mia, Jr.

Team Staff

- Team Manager:
- Team Utility:

Medical Staff

- Team Physician:
- Physical Therapist:

== Honors and awards ==
=== Shakey's V-League ===
==== Team ====
Season	Conference	Title	Source
12th (2015)	Reinforced	5th Place	

==== Individual ====
Season	Conference	Award	Player	Source
12th (2015)	Reinforced			

== See also ==
- Mahindra Enforcer (formerly Kia Carnival & Kia Sorento)
