= Angeli Tabaquero =

Filipino volleyball athlete (born 1989)

Maria Angeli Tabaquero
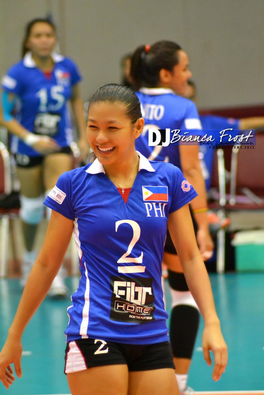
- Photograph of Maria Angeli Tabaquero

Personal information
- Born: June 21, 1989 (age 37)
- Hometown: San Jose del Monte, Bulacan, Philippines
- Height: 174 cm (5 ft 9 in)
- Weight: 61 kg (134 lb)
- Spike: 270 cm (110 in)
- Block: 257 cm (101 in)

Coaching information
- Current team: Adamson Lady Falcons

Volleyball information
- Position: Outside hitter
- Number: 2

National team
2013	Philippines

Maria Angeli Tabaquero (born June 21, 1989) is a Filipino volleyball athlete. She was a member of the UAAP champion teams of the UST Golden Tigresses (2008–2010).

== Career ==
Tabaquero was named team captain for the Philippine national team in 2013 in the Asian Championship. She was the captain of the Cagayan Valley Lady Rising Suns club that won the 2013 Shakey's V-League Open Conference over Smart-Maynilad Net Spikers in the finals. She played the 2014 Asian Club Championship with PLDT HOME TVolution in March.

As team captain, Tabaquero played for Kia Forte in the 2015 Shakey's V-League 12th Season Reinforced Open Conference. Tabaquero participated in the 2016 PSL Invitational Cup with Foton Toplanders as team's Libero. Even when she thought it would be a temporary role, she played this position until the last match, when she suffered an injury, and her team could not reach the playoffs. She was appointed as assistant coach for the Adamson Lady Falcons in September 2016.

== Clubs ==
- (Philippines) Cagayan Valley Lady Rising Suns (2013)
- (Philippines) PLDT HOME TVolution (2014)
- (Philippines) Kia Forte (2015)
- (Philippines) Foton Toplanders (2016)
