= Ayel Estrañero =

Filipino volleyball player

Arielle Estrañero

Personal information
- Full name: Maria Arielle Lusabia Estrañero
- Nickname: Ayel
- Born: July 22, 1996 (age 30)
- Hometown: Bacolod, Negros Occidental
- Height: 5 ft 4 in (1.63 m)
- Weight: 59 kg (130 lb)
- Spike: 264.5 cm (104.1 in)
- Block: 267 cm (105 in)
- Education: University of the Philippines - Diliman

Volleyball information
- Position: Setter
- Current club: Cignal HD Spikers
- Number: 7

Career
Years	Teams
2015-2019	UP Fighting Maroons
2019-2021	Motolite
2021	Cignal

Maria Arielle Estrañero is a Filipino volleyball athlete player. She is a former player of the UP Lady Fighting Maroons in the UAAP in both indoor and beach volleyball.

== Career ==
Estrañero studied her secondary education at University of St. La Salle in Bacolod. She was one of the players who represented Western Visayas in the Palarong Pambansa 2014 where she won the Best Attacker award. She attended the University of the Philippines - Diliman taking up Communication Research. She played multiple positions for the UP Lady Fighting Maroons as a converted setter, converted libero, and as an attacker. Together with her teammate, Tots Carlos, they won the bronze medal in the UAAP Season 80 Beach Volleyball Tournament.

In 2021, she joined the Cignal HD Spikers after her team Motolite was disbanded in the Premier Volleyball League. She left Cignal in 2023.

== Awards ==
- (Philippines) UP Fighting Maroons Volleyball Team (2015–2019)
- (Philippines) Motolite Power Builders (2019–2021)
- (Philippines) Cignal HD Spikers (2021)

=== Individual ===
- 2014 Palarong Pambansa "Best Attacker"

=== Collegiate ===
- Shakey's V-League 13th Season Collegiate Conference - Bronze medal, with UP Fighting Lady Maroons
- 2016 Founders' Cup Philippines - Champion, with UP Fighting Lady Maroons
- 2017 Founders' Cup Philippines - Champion, with UP Fighting Lady Maroons
- UAAP Season 80 Beach Volleyball - Bronze medal, with UP Fighting Lady Maroons
- 2018 Premier Volleyball League Collegiate Conference - Champion, with UP Fighting Lady Maroons
- 2018 PSL Collegiate Grand Slam Conference - Champion, with UP Fighting Lady Maroons
