= Isa Molde =

Filipino volleyball player

Personal information
- Full name: Maria Lina Isabel M. Molde
- Born: October 18, 1998 (age 28)
- Hometown: Catmon, Cebu, Philippines
- Height: 5 ft 7 in (1.70 m)
- Weight: 77.5 kg (171 lb)
- Spike: 328 cm (129 in)
- Block: 320 cm (130 in)
- Education: University of the Philippines Diliman

Volleyball information
- Position: Outside hitter
- Current club: Choco Mucho Flying Titans

Career
Years	Teams
2015–2020	University of the Philippines
2018	Foton Tornadoes
2019	Motolite Power Builders
2021	PLDT High Speed Hitters
2022–present	Choco Mucho Flying Titans

National team
2014	Philippines (U17)
2019	Philippines (U23)

Maria Lina Isabel "Isa" Molde (born October 18, 1998) is a Filipino professional volleyball player playing for the Choco Mucho Flying Titans in the Premier Volleyball League (PVL).

== Career ==
Molde was a member of the U17 Philippines national women's volleyball team in 2014, the Under-17 team finished 7th among 13 teams in the 2014 Asian Youth Girls Volleyball Championship. It defeated Australia and India while losing to China in straight sets in the Group C stage. In the qualifying round, it lost to Thailand while winning against New Zealand in 4 sets. In the quarterfinals, it lost to South Korea. In the 5th–8th place playoffs, it lost to Kazakhstan in 5 sets. In the 7th place game, it won against New Zealand again. She joined the UP Lady Maroons for the UAAP Season 78 volleyball tournaments. Molde was the first ever Lady Maroon to bag the "Rookie of the Year" Award. She also played with the Lady Maroons for the UAAP Season 79 volleyball tournaments where they finished 5th place. In the 2015 Shakey's V-League Reinforced Conference she placed in third place with UP Lady Maroons. In the 2016 Shakey's V-League Collegiate Conference she also ranked third and won the First Best Outside Spiker individual award.

In the 2018 Premier Volleyball League Collegiate Conference, Molde became the first player in league history to win Most Valuable Player, Finals Most Valuable Player, and an All-Premier Team award in the same conference.

In 2019, she was chosen to be the Team Captain and Skipper for the Philippine National U-23 Women's Volleyball Team who is set to compete for the 3rd Asian Women's U-23 Volleyball Championship in Vietnam this coming July 13–21, 2019. She is also currently the Co-Captain of the University of the Philippines Women's Volleyball Team.

== Personal life ==
Molde was born in Catmon, Cebu, Philippines, and spent her teenage years in Metro Manila for her high school and college studies. She went to Hope Christian High School in Manila, and studied at the University of the Philippines.

== Awards ==
=== Individual ===
- UAAP Season 78 "Rookie of the Year"
- 2016 Shakey's V-League Season 13 Collegiate Conference "1st Best Outside Spiker"
- 2018 Premier Volleyball League Collegiate Conference "1st Best Outside Spiker"
- 2018 Premier Volleyball League Collegiate Conference "Conference Most Valuable Player"
- 2018 Premier Volleyball League Collegiate Conference "Finals Most Valuable Player"'

=== Collegiate ===
- Shakey's V-League 12th Season Reinforced Open Conference - Bronze medal, with UP Fighting Lady Maroons
- Shakey's V-League 13th Season Collegiate Conference - Bronze medal, with UP Fighting Lady Maroons
- 2016 Founders' Cup Philippines - Champion, with UP Fighting Lady Maroons
- 2017 Founders' Cup Philippines - Champion, with UP Fighting Lady Maroons
- 2018 Premier Volleyball League Collegiate Conference - Champion, with UP Fighting Lady Maroons
- UAAP Season 80 Beach Volleyball - Bronze medal, with UP Fighting Lady Maroons
- UAAP Season 81 Beach Volleyball - Bronze medal, with UP Fighting Lady Maroons
- 2018 UniGames Indoor Volleyball - Bronze medal, with UP Fighting Lady Maroons

=== Club ===
- 2018 Philippine Superliga Grand Prix – Bronze medal, with Foton Tornadoes
- 2017 Premier Volleyball League All-Stars – Champions, with Team Roger
- 2016 Premier Volleyball League All-Stars – Champions, with Team Palaban
- 2023 VTV International Women's Volleyball Cup – Bronze medal, with Choco Mucho Flying Titans
- 2023 Premier Volleyball League Second All-Filipino Conference – 1st Runner-Up, with Choco Mucho Flying Titans
- 2024 Premier Volleyball League All-Filipino Conference – 1st Runner-Up, with Choco Mucho Flying Titans
