= 2016 Philippine National Games =

Multi-Sport Event in the Philippines

2016 POC-PSC Games
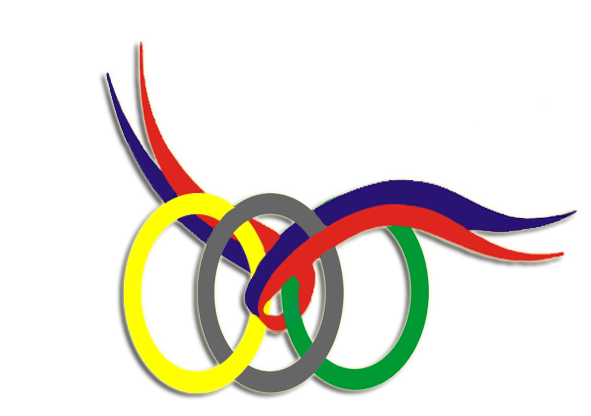
- Host city: Lingayen, Pangasinan (National Finals); Various (Metro Manila, Zamboanga del Sur and Antique) (Qualification and National Finals for selected sports)
- Country: Philippines
- Events: 27
- Opening: Various
- Website: png.psc.gov.ph

The 2016 Philippine National Games was a national multi-sport event. A series of smaller multi-sport events were held in three separate venues and legs in Luzon, Visayas, and Mindanao. Some sports also served as qualifying events for National Finals to be hosted by the province of Pangasinan from March 7–11, 2016.

== Events ==
Events
Area	Dates	Host/s	Main Venue	Sports	
Area	Dates	Host/s	Main Venue	Qualifying events (for finals)	National finals*
Luzon	July 2–6, 2015	Metro Manila	Rizal Memorial Sports Complex, PhilSports Complex, Marikina Sports Complex.	Athletics, Archery, Arnis, Badminton, Boxing, Chess, Karate, Billiards, Swimming, Taekwondo	Table tennis, Cycling, Wrestling, Baseball, Lawn tennis, Fencing, Judo, Sepak Takraw, Volleyball, Football, Dancesport, Waterpolo, Rugby
Mindanao	September 10–14, 2015	Pagadian, Zamboanga del Sur		Athletics, Archery, Arnis, Badminton, Boxing, Chess, Karate, Billiards, Swimming, Taekwondo	Softball, Futsal
Visayas	November 10–14, 2015	Antique		Athletics, Archery, Arnis, Badminton, Boxing, Chess, Karate, Billiards, Swimming, Taekwondo	Pencak Silat, Weightlifting, Muay Thai
Luzon	November 21, 2015	Subic			Triathlon
Luzon	March 7–11, 2016	Lingayen, Pangasinan			Arnis, Athletics, Badminton, Billiards, Boxing, Chess, Karatedo, Swimming, Taekwondo, Cycling, Dancesports, Futsal, Judo, Lawn tennis, Muay Thai, Pencak silat, Sepak takraw, Table tennis, Volleyball, Weightlifting, Wrestling
(*) May be participated by athletes from Luzon, Visayas and Mindanao.

== Sports ==
There are 10 sports events which also served as qualifiers for the finals to be held in 2016 which were held in all three legs of the games. Only athletes from the hosting region are eligible to participate in these qualifying events. (e.g. Athletes from Luzon can only participate in the Luzon leg, and so on). The other events can be participated by athletes from any region. The non-qualifying events were scattered across the three legs with the Luzon leg hosting most number of events.

- Archery
- Arnis
- Athletics
- Badminton
- Baseball
- Billiards
- Boxing
- Chess
- Cycling
- Dancesport
- Fencing
- Football
- Futsal
- Handball
- Judo
- Karate
- Lawn tennis
- Muay Thai
- Pencak silat
- Rugby
- Sepak takraw
- Softball
- Swimming
- Table tennis
- Taekwondo
- Triathlon
- Volleyball
- Water polo
- Weightlifting
- Wrestling
