= 2015 Shakey's V-League Reinforced Open Conference =

Shakey's V-League 12th Season Reinforced Open Conference
| Women's Finals | G1 | G2 | Wins |
|---|---|---|---|
| Phil. Army Lady Troopers | 2 | 1 | 0 |
| PLDT Home Ultera | 3 | 3 | 2 |
- Duration: Oct. 10, 2015 – Dec. 6, 2015
- Arena(s): Filoil Flying V Arena, San Juan
- Finals MVP: Finals: Alyssa Valdez ( PLDT); Conference: Jovelyn Gonzaga ( Army)
- Winning coach: Roger Gorayeb
- Semifinalists: UP Lady Maroons (Bronze); Philippine Navy
- TV network(s): GMA News TV (local); GMA Life TV (international)

The 2015 Shakey's V-League Reinforced Open Conference was the 25th conference of the Shakey's V-League and the third and final conference of the 2015 season. It started on October 10, 2015 at the Filoil Flying V Arena, San Juan.

== Tournament format ==
=== Preliminaries (PL) ===
Teams will play a single round robin format.

- The TOP 4 TEAMS will advance to the semi-finals (SF) round.
- The bottom two (2) teams will be eliminated from the tournament.

=== Semi-finals (SF) ===
The top four teams at the end of the single-round eliminations will advance to semifinals, with the top two earning a twice-to-beat advantage.

- Semi-finals series: Rank 1 vs Rank 4 and Rank 2 vs Rank 3
- Top two (2) SF teams will compete for GOLD.
- Bottom two (2) SF teams will compete for BRONZE.

=== Finals ===
The battle for GOLD and the battle for BRONZE will both follow the best-of-three format, provided:

- If the battle for GOLD ends in two (2) matches (2-0), then there will no longer be a Game 3 for either GOLD or Bronze. A tie in BRONZE (1-1) will be resolve using FIVB rules.
- A tie in the series for GOLD (1-1) after Game 2 will be broken in a Game 3, regardless of the result of the series in BRONZE.

== Participating teams ==
| Abbr | Team |
|---|---|
| KIA | Kia Forte |
| PAR | Philippine Army Lady Troopers |
| PCG | Philippine Coast Guard Lady Dolphins |
| PNV | Philippine Navy Lady Sailors |
| PLD | PLDT Home Ultera Ultra Fast Hitters |
| UPD | UP Lady Maroons |

=== Conference Line-up ===
Kia Forte
| No. | Player name | Position |
| 1 | MICEK, Alexa | OH |
| 3 | CASTAÑEDA, Danielle Michiko | MB |
| 4 | AGANON, Carmina | OP |
| 6 | PINEDA, Shiela Marie | OH |
| 7 | EULALIO, Wenneth | MB |
| 9 | GUEVARRA, Faye Janelle | MB |
| 10 | CUI, Felicia Marie | L |
| 11 | LEGACION, Angelica | S |
| 12 | REYES, Jennylyn | L |
| 14 | BASCO, Khristine | OP |
| 15 | TABAQUERO, Maria Angeli (c) | OH |
| 16 | LAYUG, Alyssa | OH |
| 17 | SAET, Relea Felina | S |
| 18 | MAGSUMBOL, Kathlene | OH |
| | ALMADRO, Oliver | Head Coach |
| | MIA, Mario Jr. | Asst Coach |

Philippine Army Lady Troopers
| No. | Player name | Position |
| 1 | SABAS, Genie | MB |
| 2 | SIATAN-TORRES, Patricia | L |
| 3 | BUNAG, Joanne | OP |
| 4 | MARAÑO, Abigail | MB |
| 5 | Cpl. BALSE-PABAYO, Mary Jean | MB |
| 6 | PALMA, Mary Remy Joy | MB |
| 7 | Sgt. SALAK, Cristina (c) | S |
| 8 | Cpl. GONZAGA, Jovelyn | OP |
| 9 | CAROLINO, Michelle | OP |
| 10 | NUNAG, Angela | OH |
| 12 | Pvt. TUBINO, Honey Royse | OH |
| 14 | PFC BAUTISTA, Nerissa | OH |
| 15 | PFC AGNO, Christine | L |
| 16 | GONZALES, Sarah Jane | S |
| | Sgt. REYES, Emilio Jr. "Kung-Fu" | Head Coach |
| | Sgt. DE GUZMAN, Enrico | Asst. Coach |

Philippine Coast Guard Lady Dolphins
| No. | Player name | Position |
| 2 | CLARETE, Nelet | - |
| 3 | ENIONG, Shallane | - |
| 4 | FAJARDO, Rossan (c) | OH |
| 5 | DELOS SANTOS, Sandra | - |
| 6 | SERRATO, Carla Jane | - |
| 7 | VALENCIA, Cindy | MB |
| 9 | ABRENICA, Cherry Mae | L |
| 10 | ROSALE, Mary Cristel | - |
| 12 | MACABUHAY, Hyrize | MB |
| 13 | MANANSALA, Michelle | - |
| 14 | ACEPCION, Lea | L |
| 15 | PONON, Abegail | S |
| 16 | DAWSON, Samantha | OH |
| 17 | OGANA, Melissa Kamille | - |
| | ORDON, Butch | Head Coach |
| | PO3 MORALES, Raymund | Asst. Coach |

Philippine Navy Lady Sailors
| No. | Player name | Position |
| 2 | SORIANO, Ma. Paulina | MB |
| 3 | DIAZ, Norie Jane | OH |
| 4 | TICAR, Mary Jane Diane | L |
| 5 | SERAFICA, Janet (c) | S |
| 6 | DESENGAÑO, Mariel | - |
| 7 | FORTUNO, Jennifer | L |
| 9 | ACUÑA, Hezzymie | - |
| 10 | MADULID, Florence May | OH |
| 11 | MABBAYAD, Lilet | OH |
| 12 | EGUIA, Devine | - |
| 13 | GENIDO, Pauline May | OP |
| 14 | VERONAS, Therese Maureen | MB |
| 16 | DELA CRUZ, Charmine | - |
| 17 | MARTINEZ, Carissa Yvette | - |
| | PO3 YBAÑEZ-CHAVEZ PN, Zenaida "Nene" | Head Coach |
| | PO3 SUSON PN, Aileen | Asst. Coach |

PLDT Home Ultera
| No. | Player name | Position |
| 1 | DE LEON, Rubie | S |
| 2 | VALDEZ, Alyssa | OH |
| 3 | ROCES, Suzanne (c) | OP |
| 4 | DEVANADERA, Rysabelle | MB |
| 5 | DE JESUS, Jorella Marie | L/OH |
| 6 | SOLTONES, Gretchel | OH |
| 7 | (United States) FREEMAN, Sareea | MB/I |
| 8 | MAIZO-PONTILLAS, Aiza | OP |
| 9 | MARCIANO, Janine | OH |
| 10 | (United States) HURTT, Victoria | OH/I |
| 11 | LATIGAY, Laurence Ann | OH |
| 12 | FERRER, Jamenea | S |
| 14 | SORIANO, Ma. Rosario | MB |
| 16 | GATA-PANTONE, Lizlee Ann | L |
| | GORAYEB, Rogelio "Roger" | Head Coach |
| | MALAZO, Clint | Asst. Coach |

UP Lady Maroons
| No. | Player name | Position |
| 1 | LAI, Jewel Hannah | S |
| 2 | BASARTE, Mae Angeli | S |
| 4 | ILUSTRE, Arrianne Elise | OH |
| 6 | SANDOVAL, Caryl | OH |
| 7 | CHOPITEA, Sheena Mae | MB |
| 8 | BERSOLA, Katherine Adrielle (c) | MB |
| 10 | MOLDE, Maria Lina Isabel | OH |
| 11 | BUITRE, Marian Alisa | MB |
| 12 | GAISER, Princess Ira | L |
| 13 | DOROG, Justine | OH |
| 15 | GANNABAN, Aieshalaine | MB |
| 16 | CAILING, Rose Mary | S |
| 18 | CARLOS, Diana Mae | OP |
| 19 | TIAMZON, Nicole Anne | OH |
| | YEE, Jerry | Head Coach |
| | DE LARA, Katrina | Asst. Coach |

Legend
| I | Import |
| S | Setter |
| MB | Middle Blocker |
| OH | Outside Hitter |
| OP | Opposite Hitter |
| L | Libero |
| (c) | Team Captain |

== Preliminary round ==
| Pos | Team | Pld | W | L | Pts | SW | SL | SR | SPW | SPL | SPR | Qualification |
|---|---|---|---|---|---|---|---|---|---|---|---|---|
| 1 | Philippine Army Lady Troopers | 5 | 5 | 0 | 14 | 15 | 3 | 5.000 | 438 | 313 | 1.399 | Semifinals |
| 2 | PLDT Home Ultera | 5 | 4 | 1 | 13 | 14 | 6 | 2.333 | 462 | 358 | 1.291 | Semifinals |
| 3 | UP Lady Maroons | 5 | 2 | 3 | 6 | 9 | 10 | 0.900 | 401 | 450 | 0.891 | Semifinals |
| 4 | Philippine Navy Lady Sailors | 5 | 2 | 3 | 6 | 8 | 9 | 0.889 | 360 | 390 | 0.923 | Semifinals |
| 5 | Kia Forte | 5 | 1 | 4 | 4 | 6 | 13 | 0.462 | 380 | 422 | 0.900 | Eliminated |
| 6 | Philippine Coast Guard Lady Dolphins | 5 | 1 | 4 | 2 | 3 | 14 | 0.214 | 312 | 420 | 0.743 | Eliminated |

=== Match results ===
| Date | Time | | Score | | Set 1 | Set 2 | Set 3 | Set 4 | Set 5 | Total | Report |
|---|---|---|---|---|---|---|---|---|---|---|---|
| 10/10 | 12:45 | PNV | 1–3 | UPD | 25–19 | 23–25 | 23–25 | 23–25 | – | 94–94 | P2 |
| 10/11 | 12:45 | PCG | 0–3 | PLD | 10–25 | 11–25 | 20–25 | – | – | 41–75 | |
| 10/11 | 15:00 | KIA | 0–3 | PAR | 15–25 | 18–25 | 11–25 | – | – | 44–75 | |
| 10/17 | 12:45 | PCG | 0–3 | PNV | 20–25 | 23–25 | 21–25 | – | – | 64–75 | P2 |
| 10/24 | 12:45 | UPD | 3–0 | PCG | 25–20 | 25–22 | 27–25 | – | – | 77–67 | P2 |
| 10/25 | 12:45 | KIA | 0–3 | PNV | 18–25 | 23–25 | 21–25 | – | – | 62–75 | |
| 10/25 | 15:00 | PAR | 3–2 | PLD | 25–23 | 23–25 | 25–11 | 19–25 | 15–13 | 107–97 | |
| 10/31 | 12:45 | PLD | 3–1 | UPD | 25–12 | 22–25 | 25–15 | 25–17 | – | 97–69 | P2 |
| 10/31 | 15:00 | PCG | 3–2 | KIA | 12–25 | 25–22 | 14–25 | 25–23 | 17–15 | 93–110 | P2 |
| 10/31 | 17:00 | PNV | 0–3 | PAR | 14–25 | 17–25 | 14–25 | – | – | 45–75 | P2 |
| 11/07 | 12:45 | PLD | 3–1 | PNV | 25–20 | 20–25 | 25–13 | 25–13 | – | 95–71 | P2 |
| 11/08 | 12:45 | PAR | 3–0 | PCG | 25–4 | 25–12 | 33–31 | – | – | 83–47 | P2 |
| 11/08 | 15:00 | UPD | 1–3 | KIA | 22–25 | 25–19 | 15-25 | 19–25 | – | 81–69 | P2 |
| 11/14 | 12:45 | PLD | 3–1 | KIA | 25–12 | 25–12 | 23–25 | 25–21 | – | 98–70 | P2 |
| 11/14 | 15:00 | PAR | 3–1 | UPD | 23–25 | 25–18 | 25–14 | 25–23 | – | 98–80 | P2 |

== Semifinals round ==
- Ranking is based from the preliminary round.

Semi-finals
* Rank #1 twice-to-beat
#1 Army Lady Troopers | 1
#4 Navy Lady Sailors | 0
* Rank #2 twice-to-beat
#2 PLDT Home Ultera | 1
#3 UP Lady Maroons | 0

Final
best of 3 series
Army Lady Troopers | 0
PLDT Home Ultera | 2
Third place
best of 3 series
Navy Lady Sailors | 0
UP Lady Maroons | 2

=== Rank 1 vs Rank 4 ===
* Philippine Army Lady Troopers (Rank #1) had the twice-to-beat advantage

| Date | Time | | Score | | Set 1 | Set 2 | Set 3 | Set 4 | Set 5 | Total | Report |
|---|---|---|---|---|---|---|---|---|---|---|---|
| 11/22 | 12:45 | PAR | 3–0 | PNV | 25–16 | 25–10 | 25–22 | – | – | 75–48 | P2 |

=== Rank 2 vs Rank 3 ===
* PLDT Home Ultera (Rank #2) had the twice-to-beat advantage

| Date | Time | | Score | | Set 1 | Set 2 | Set 3 | Set 4 | Set 5 | Total | Report |
|---|---|---|---|---|---|---|---|---|---|---|---|
| 11/22 | 12:45 | PLD | 3–0 | UPD | 25–11 | 25–17 | 25–17 | – | – | 75–45 | P2 |

== Finals ==
=== Battle for Bronze ===
| November 28, 2015; 15:00 | UP Lady Maroons | 3–1 | Philippine Navy Lady Sailors | Filoil Flying V Arena; Attendance: 842; Referees: E. Buquid, P. Sison |
| November 28, 2015; 15:00 | (18–25, 25–19, 25–22, 25–10); Match Result P2; POG: #13 Justine Dorog, with 16 attacks and 2 service aces. | | | Filoil Flying V Arena; Attendance: 842; Referees: E. Buquid, P. Sison |

| December 6, 2015; 12:45 | Philippine Navy Lady Sailors | 1–3 | UP Lady Maroons | Filoil Flying V Arena; Attendance: 2,571; Referees: D. Malazarte, P. Sison |
| December 6, 2015; 12:45 | (20–25, 26–24, 23–25, 15–25); Match Result P2; POG: #8 Kathy Bersola, with 14 attacks, 3 blocks and 1 service ace. | | | Filoil Flying V Arena; Attendance: 2,571; Referees: D. Malazarte, P. Sison |

University of the Philippines Lady Maroons won the series in two games.

=== Battle for Gold ===
| November 28, 2015; 12:45 | PLDT Home Ultera | 3–2 | Philippine Army Lady Troopers | Filoil Flying V Arena; Attendance: 1,732; Referees: J. Villareal, A. Tabañag |
| November 28, 2015; 12:45 | (16–25, 20–25, 26–24, 29–27, 18–16); Match Result P2; POG: #2 Alyssa Valdez with 22 attacks, 1 block & 2 service aces | | | Filoil Flying V Arena; Attendance: 1,732; Referees: J. Villareal, A. Tabañag |

| December 6, 2015; 15:00 | Philippine Army Lady Troopers | 1–3 | PLDT Home Ultera | Filoil Flying V Arena; Attendance: 3,628; Referees: R. Rojas, Efren Gaa |
| December 6, 2015; 15:00 | (21–25, 22–25, 25–22, 21–25); Match Result P2; POG: #2 Alyssa Valdez, with 17 attacks, 1 block and 4 service aces | | | Filoil Flying V Arena; Attendance: 3,628; Referees: R. Rojas, Efren Gaa |

PLDT Home Ultera won the series in two games.

== Final standings ==
| Rank | Team |
|---|---|
| 1st place, gold medalist(s) | PLDT Home Ultera |
| 2nd place, silver medalist(s) | Philippine Army Lady Troopers |
| 3rd place, bronze medalist(s) | University of the Philippines Lady Maroons |
| 4 | Philippine Navy Lady Sailors |
| 5 | Kia Forte |
| 6 | Philippine Coast Guard Lady Dolphins |

Shakey's V-League 12th Season Reinforced Open Conference Champions
PLDT Home Ultera Ultra Fast Hitters
2nd title

Team roster

Rubie De Leon, Alyssa Valdez, Sue Roces (c), Sasa Devanadera, Ella de Jesus (L), Grethcel Soltones, (United States) Sareea Freeman, Aiza Maizo-Pontillas, Janine Marciano, (United States) Victoria Hurtt, Louann Latigay, Jem Ferrer, Charo Soriano, Tatan Gata-Pantone (L)
Roger Gorayeb (Head Coach), Clint Malazo (Asst. Coach)

Note:
(c) – Team Captain
(L) – Libero

== Awards ==
- Most valuable player (Finals)
  - Alyssa Valdez ( PLDT)
- Most valuable player (Conference)
  - Jovelyn Gonzaga ( Army)
- Best setter
  - Janet Serafica ( Navy)
- Best Outside Spikers
  - Honey Royse Tubino ( Army)
  - Janine Marciano ( PLDT)
- Best middle blockers
  - Kathy Bersola ( UP)
  - Sheena Mae Chopitea ( UP)
- Best opposite spiker
  - Jovelyn Gonzaga ( Army)
- Best libero
  - Lizlee Ann Gata-Pantone ( PLDT)

== See also ==
- Spikers' Turf 1st Season Reinforced Open Conference
- Shakey's V-League conference results
