= Technological Institute of the Philippines =

Private, non-sectarian school in Manila

- Institusyong Panteknolohiya ng Pilipinas
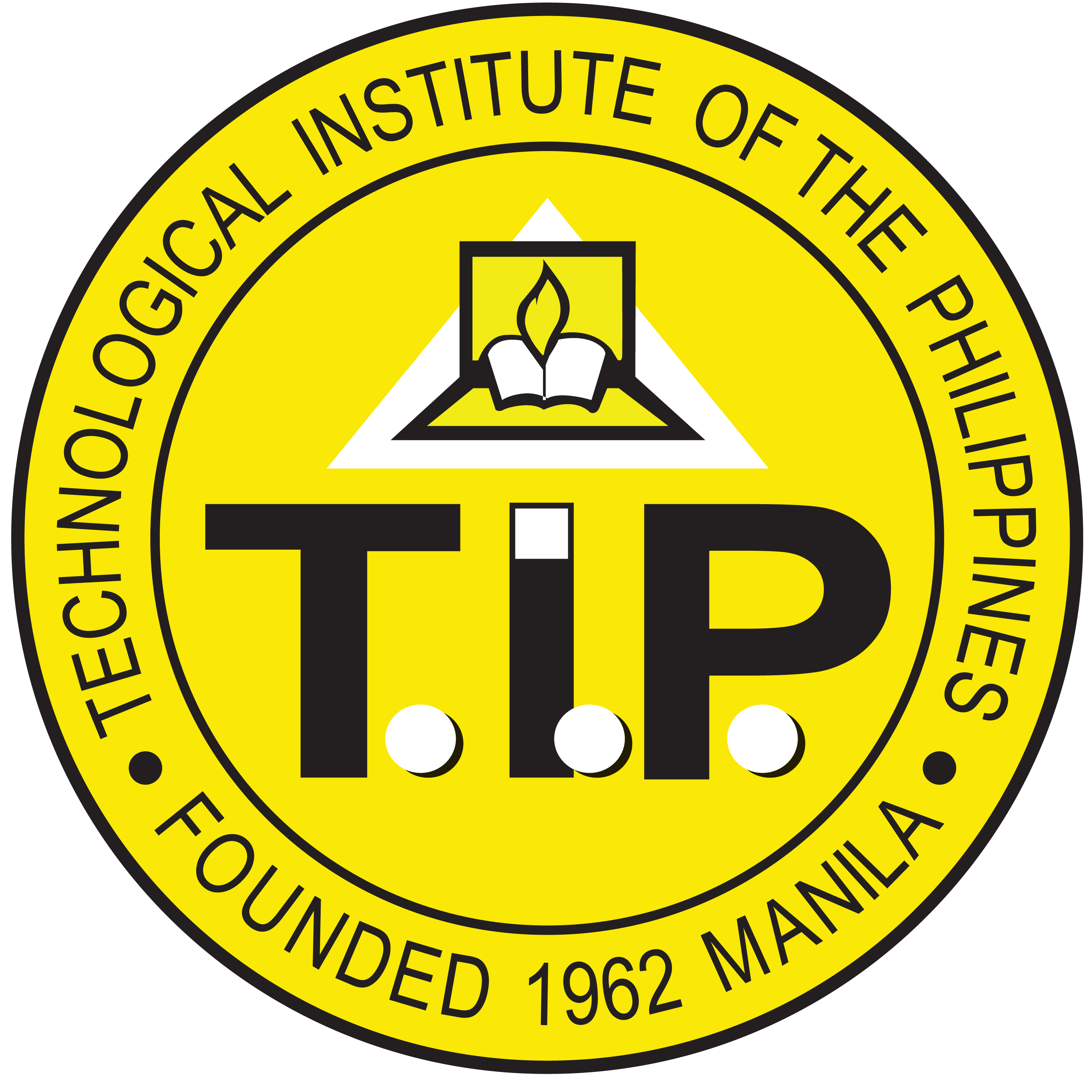
- Seal
- Type: Private
- Established: February 8, 1962, Manila
- Founders: Demetrio A. Quirino Jr. Teresita U. Quirino
- Religious affiliation: Non-sectarian
- Academic affiliations: ABET, ASAIHL, AUN-QA, DNV, FAAP PACUCOA, PACU, PAES, PERAA, PICAB, PTC
- Chairperson: Elizabeth Quirino-Lahoz
- President: Angelo Quirino Lahoz
- Vice-president: Angel C. Lahoz
- Location: 363 P. Casal St., Quiapo, Manila, 1338 Arlegui St., Quiapo, Manila, 938 Aurora Boulevard, Cubao, Quezon City, Metro Manila, Philippines; 14°35′43″N 120°59′17″E
- Campus: Urban
- Language: Filipino, English
- Alma Mater song: "You'll Be in My Heart Forever"
- Fight song: "We're on Top of the World"
- Colors: Yellow and black
- Website: tip.edu.ph
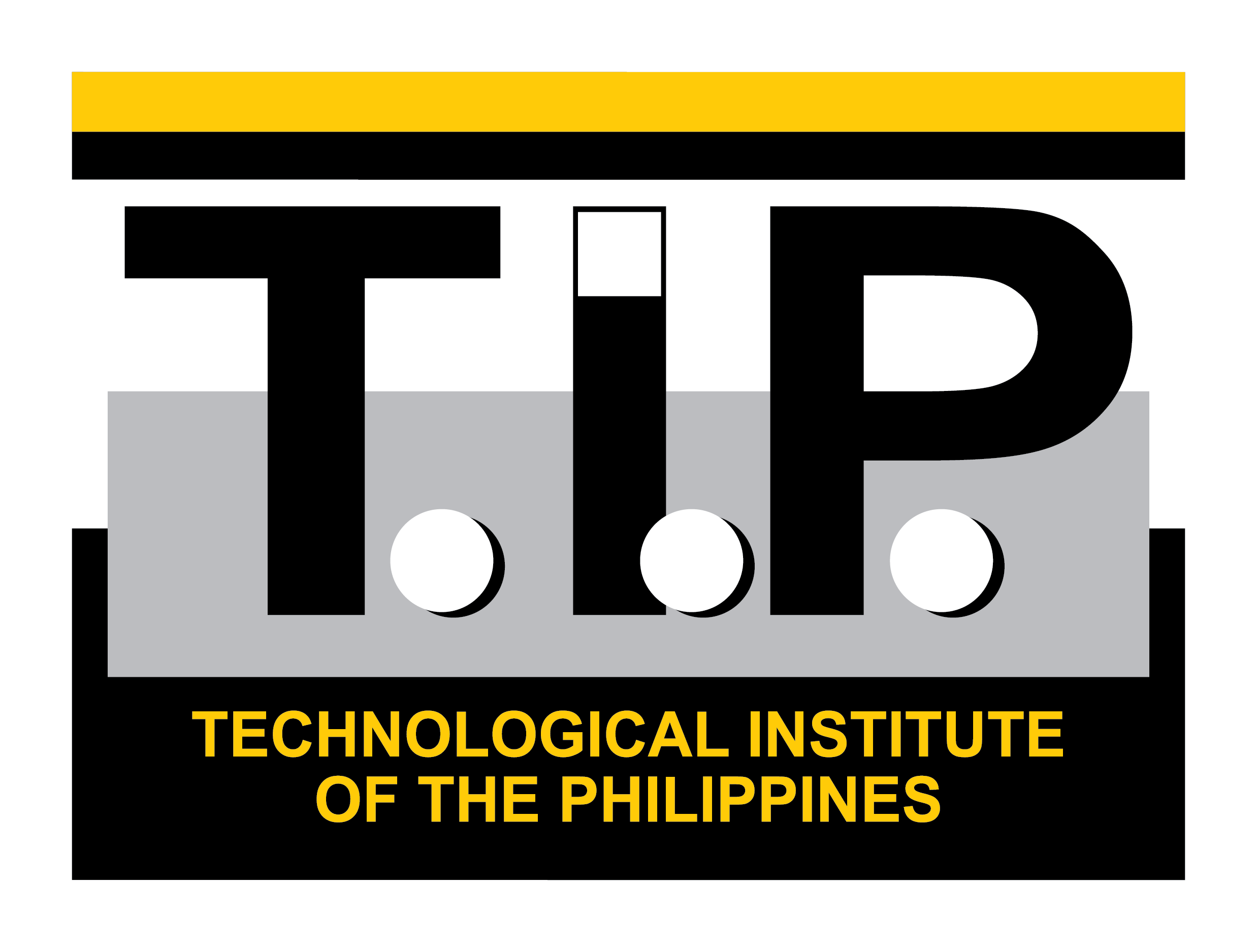

The Technological Institute of the Philippines (T.I.P.; Filipino: Institusyong Panteknolohiya ng Pilipinas) is a private, non-sectarian higher education institution with three campuses located in Metro Manila.

== Overview ==
T.I.P. was founded in Manila on February 8, 1962, by a group of educators led by Demetrio A. Quirino Jr. and his wife Teresita U. Quirino. As of 2025, the founders' daughter, Elizabeth Quirino-Lahoz, is serving as chairperson; and her firstborn son, Angelo Quirino Lahoz, is serving as president.

While touted as an engineering school, T.I.P also offers undergraduate programs in computer-related studies, architecture, business administration, teacher education, and political science. Similarly, T.I.P offers enrollments to senior high school and graduate studies in select engineering and computing disciplines.

T.I.P. Campuses

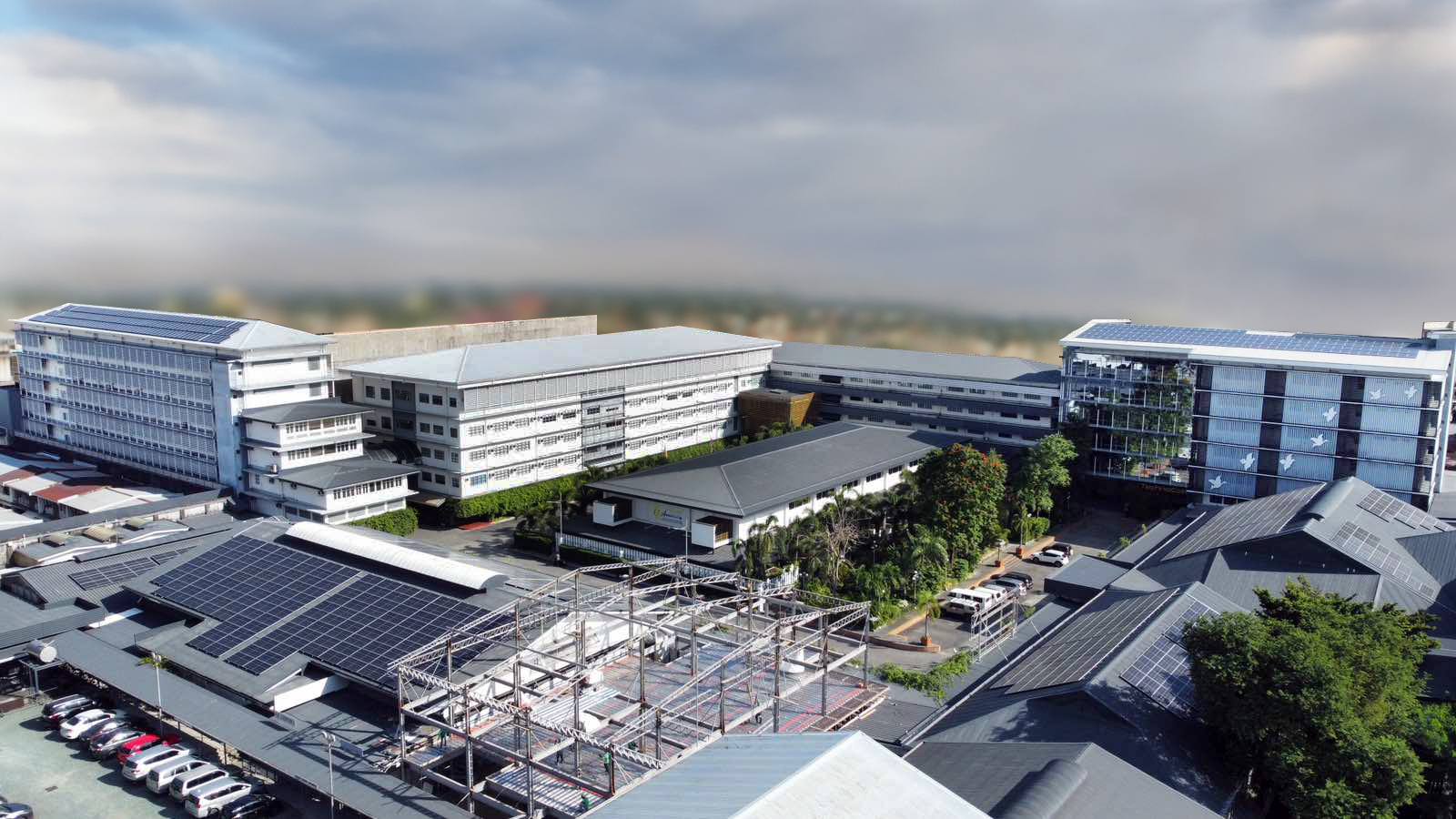
T.I.P. Quezon City

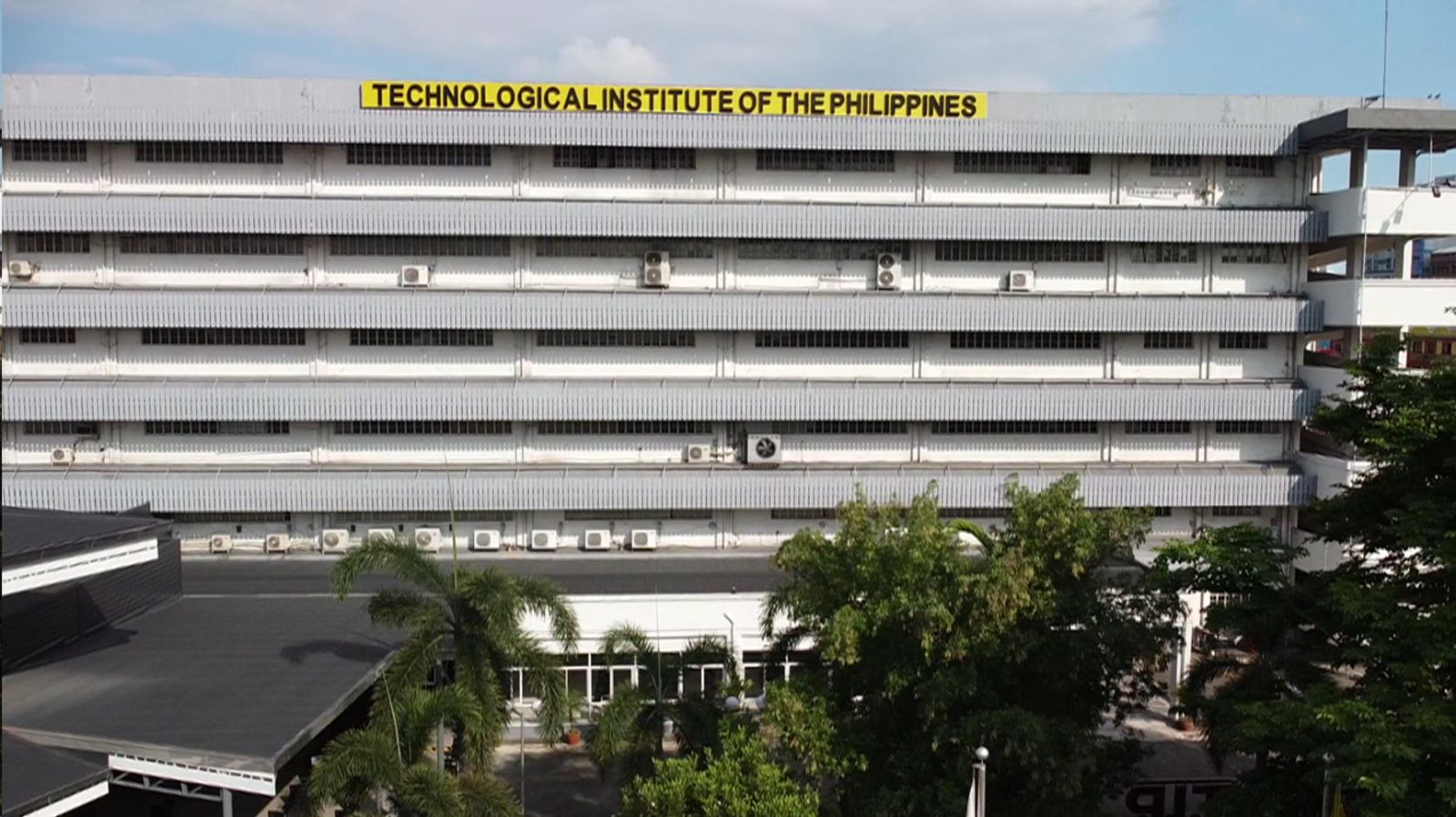
T.I.P. Manila - P. Casal

T.I.P. Manila - Arlegui

== Recognitions ==
In 2016, the Commission on Higher Education (CHED) awarded T.I.P., among other public and private higher educational institutions (HEIs), the Center of Excellence and Center of Development for their engineering, information technology, and business administration programs. CHED granted T.I.P. a five-year autonomous status that same year, citing "top-quality education and consistently excellent program results" as deciding factor. The autonomous status was renewed for 2024–2027.

An employer survey conducted by Jobstreet in 2023 found that T.I.P. was among the top schools preferred by Philippine employers, particularly in the construction industry. In 2017, Jobstreet also ranked T.I.P. sixth among the best schools that produce quality fresh graduates.
