= Catmon =

Municipality in Cebu, Philippines

- Municipality
- Municipality of Catmon
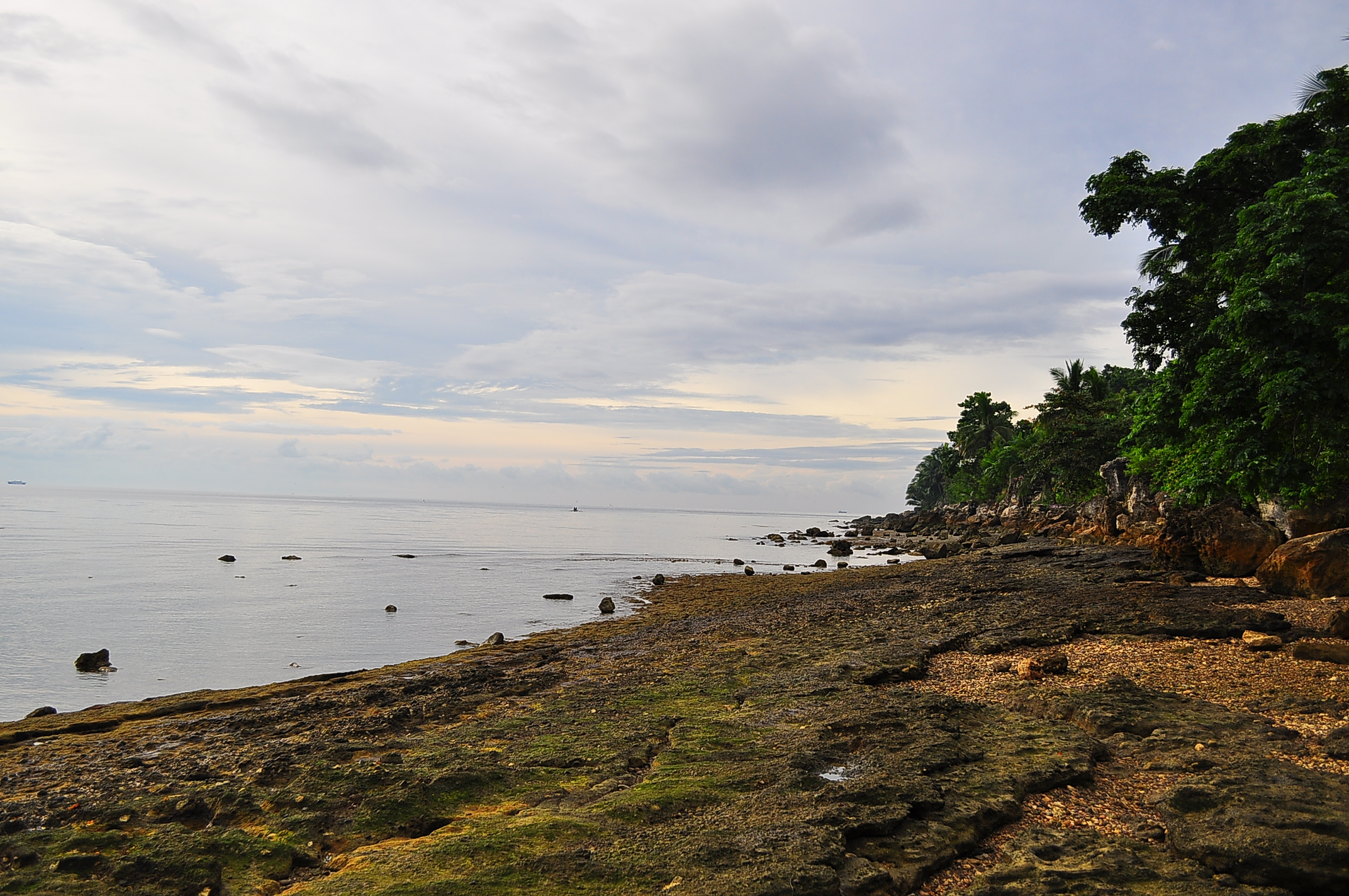
- Beach in Panalipan, Catmon

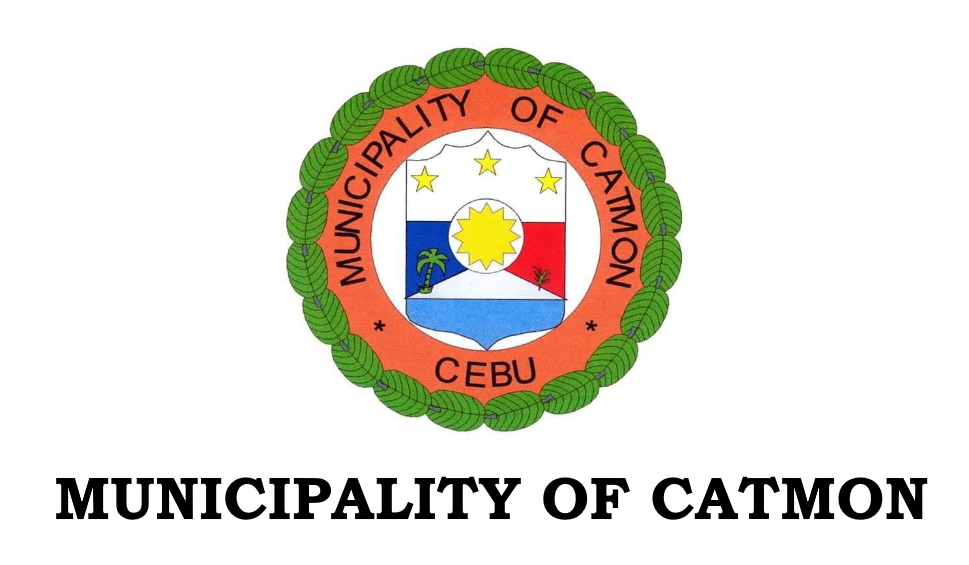
- Flag
- Anthem: Catmon March
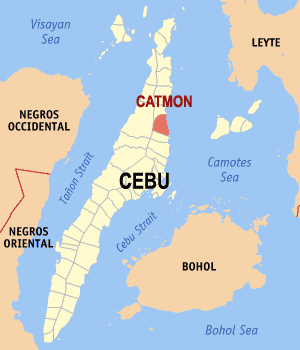
- Map of Cebu with Catmon highlighted
- Interactive map of Catmon
- Location within the Philippines
- Coordinates: 10°40′N 123°57′E
- Country: Philippines
- Region: Central Visayas
- Province: Cebu
- District: 5th district
- Founded: 1835
- Barangays: 20 (see Barangays)

Government
  - Type: Sangguniang Bayan
  - Mayor: Avis G. Monleon
  - Vice Mayor: Armel Z. Poro
  - Representative: Vincent Franco D. Frasco
  - Municipal Council: Members: Rowell G. Juban; Sagrado P. Cadiz; Ceasar C. Coloscos; Estrella C. Aribal; Jose B. Barte; Dan M. Jusay; George N. Molina; Raul F. Sususco
  - Electorate: 22,551 voters (2025)

Area
  - Total: 109.64 km^{2} (42.33 sq mi)
- Elevation: 80 m (260 ft)
- Highest elevation: 455 m (1,493 ft)
- Lowest elevation: 0 m (0 ft)

Population (2024 census)
  - Total: 34,608
  - Density: 315.65/km^{2} (817.53/sq mi)
  - Households: 8,110

Economy
  - Income class: 2nd municipal income class
  - Poverty incidence: 21.53% (2023)
  - Revenue: ₱ 176.8 million (2024)
  - Assets: ₱ 771.2 million (2024)
  - Expenditure: ₱ 69.27 million (2024)
  - Liabilities: ₱ 63.1 million (2024)

Service provider
  - Electricity: Cebu 2 Electric Cooperative (CEBECO 2)
- Time zone: UTC+8 (PST)
- ZIP code: 6006
- PSGC: 072216000
- IDD : area code: +63 (0)32
- Native languages: Cebuano; Tagalog

Catmon, officially the Municipality of Catmon (Cebuano: Lungsod sa Catmon; Tagalog: Bayan ng Catmon), is a municipality in the province of Cebu, Philippines. According to the 2024 census, it has a population of 34,608 people.

The town fiesta is celebrated every February 10 in honor of their patron saint, St. William the Hermit. Part of the annual fiesta is the Budbod Kabog Festival and participated by the public schools.

== Etymology ==
The municipality got its name from the presence of huge trees called katmon (Dillenia philippinensis) that thrive in this area. It was in 1835 that the town was founded under the Spaniards, but it was only in 1903 when the place became a municipality, after the Americans asked the leaders of Catmon and the nearby settlement of Sogod to merge into one, single municipality. 18 years after its establishment, in 1921, Sogod became a separate municipality.

== Geography ==
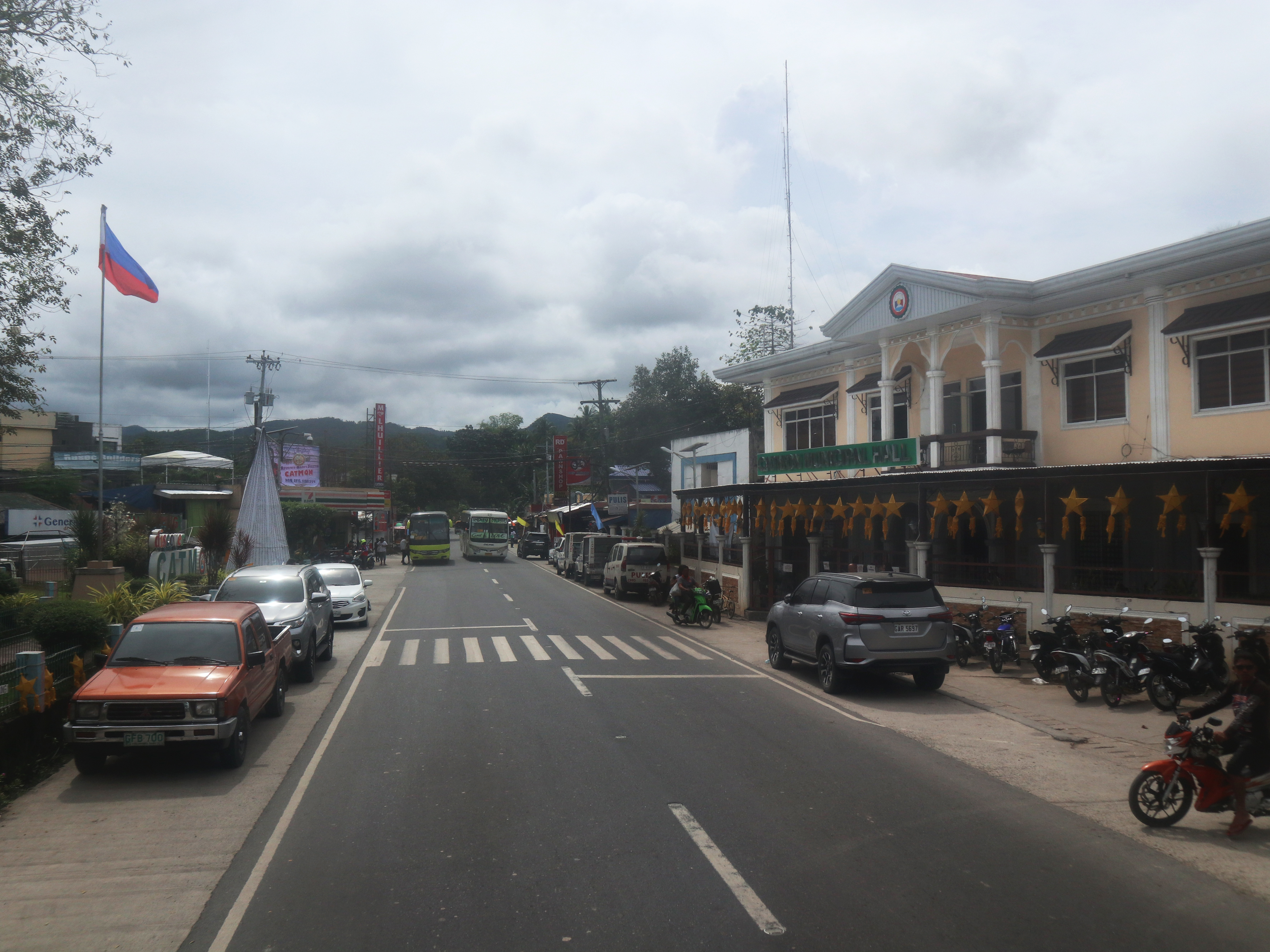
Catmon Municipal Hall

Catmon is bordered on the north by the town of Sogod, to the west by the town of Tuburan, on the east by the Camotes Sea, and on the south by the town of Carmen. It is 57 kilometres (35 mi) from Cebu City.

Catmon's topography is generally mountainous and hilly but patches of flat lands can be found along the coastline and portion of the poblacion. The municipality's climate is of Coronas climate type IV, where rainfall is evenly distributed throughout the year. Mount Capayas (Kapayas) (also known as Tore Peak), Cebu's second highest peak, is located in Cambangkaya. Mount Capayas is one of the Key Biodiversity Areas (KBAs) of Cebu.

=== Barangays ===
Catmon is politically subdivided into 20 barangays. Each barangay consists of puroks and some have sitios.

PSGC	Barangay	Population			±% p.a.	
		2024		2010		
072216001	Agsuwao	2.9%	1,008	1,004	▴	0.03%
072216002	Amancion	0.5%	190	210	▾	−0.69%
072216003	Anapog	0.9%	324	327	▾	−0.06%
072216004	Bactas	2.5%	867	878	▾	−0.09%
072216006	Basak	3.7%	1,286	1,163	▴	0.70%
072216007	Binongkalan	4.6%	1,587	1,417	▴	0.79%
072216005	Bongyas	0.9%	300	317	▾	−0.38%
072216008	Cabungaan	4.1%	1,413	1,265	▴	0.77%
072216009	Cambangkaya	2.2%	758	768	▾	−0.09%
072216010	Can‑ibuang	1.2%	398	419	▾	−0.36%
072216011	Catmondaan	8.9%	3,086	2,792	▴	0.70%
072216019	Corazon (Poblacion)	8.7%	2,994	2,836	▴	0.38%
072216012	Duyan	2.0%	684	549	▴	1.54%
072216020	Flores (Poblacion)	8.7%	3,023	2,865	▴	0.37%
072216013	Ginabucan	2.3%	809	874	▾	−0.54%
072216014	Macaas	9.8%	3,394	3,093	▴	0.65%
072216015	Panalipan	10.2%	3,544	3,161	▴	0.80%
072216018	San Jose Pob. (Catadman)	9.4%	3,250	2,832	▴	0.96%
072216016	Tabili	2.2%	764	719	▴	0.42%
072216017	Tinabyonan	2.2%	775	831	▾	−0.48%
	Total		34,608	28,320	▴	1.40%

=== Climate ===
Climate data for Catmon, Cebu
Month	Jan	Feb	Mar	Apr	May	Jun	Jul	Aug	Sep	Oct	Nov	Dec	Year
Mean daily maximum °C (°F)	28 (82)	28 (82)	29 (84)	31 (88)	31 (88)	30 (86)	29 (84)	30 (86)	29 (84)	29 (84)	29 (84)	28 (82)	29 (85)
Mean daily minimum °C (°F)	22 (72)	22 (72)	23 (73)	23 (73)	25 (77)	25 (77)	24 (75)	24 (75)	24 (75)	24 (75)	23 (73)	23 (73)	24 (74)
Average precipitation mm (inches)	70 (2.8)	49 (1.9)	62 (2.4)	78 (3.1)	138 (5.4)	201 (7.9)	192 (7.6)	185 (7.3)	192 (7.6)	205 (8.1)	156 (6.1)	111 (4.4)	1,639 (64.6)
Average rainy days	13.4	10.6	13.1	14.5	24.2	27.9	28.4	27.7	27.1	27.4	22.5	15.9	252.7
Source: Meteoblue

== Demographics ==
Population census of Catmon
Year	Pop.	±% p.a.
1903	7,027	—
1918	18,646	+6.72%
1939	11,738	−2.18%
1948	11,761	+0.02%
1960	13,412	+1.10%
1970	14,837	+1.01%
1975	15,923	+1.43%
1980	17,357	+1.74%
1990	19,773	+1.31%
1995	21,647	+1.71%
2000	25,083	+3.21%
2007	27,330	+1.19%
2010	28,320	+1.30%
2015	30,471	+1.40%
2020	33,745	+2.17%
2024	34,608	+0.61%
Source: Philippine Statistics Authority

== Economy ==
Poverty incidence of Catmon (%)

Source: Philippine Statistics Authority
