= Gene Afable =

Filipino basketball coach

Meralco Bolts
- Position: Assistant coach
- League: PBA

Personal information
- Born: April 21, 1968

Career information
- College: Ateneo
- Coaching career: 1998–present

Career history

Playing
- 1989–1990: Crispa 400

Coaching
- 1998–present: Ateneo (assistant)
- 2012–2014: Talk 'N Text Tropang Texters (assistant)
- 2014–present: Meralco Bolts (assistant)

Career highlights
- As assistant coach: 2× PBA champion (2012–13 Philippine, 2024 Philippine); PBA Baby Dalupan Coach of the Year (2024); PBA D-League champion (2019 Aspirants' Cup); 2022 World University Basketball Series (WUBS) champion; AsiaBasket champion (2023 Las Piñas); 10× UAAP champion (2002, 2008–2012, 2017–2019, 2022); 2× Filoil Flying V Cup champion (2011, 2018); 5× PCCL champion (2007, 2009, 2010, 2018, 2019); As player: 2× UAAP champion (1987, 1988)

Gene Louis Afable (born April 21, 1968) is a Filipino basketball coach who currently serves as an assistant coach for the Meralco Bolts.

== Playing career ==
Afable played for the Ateneo Blue Eagles with Olsen Racela, Jun Reyes, Eric Reyes, Jojo Lastimosa, and Jet Nieto (father of Matt and Mike Nieto). Afable won 2 UAAP championship with Eric Reyes, Jun Reyes, Racela and Nieto, defeating UE in 1987 and Dindo Pumaren-led La Salle in 1988. He also played for Crispa 400.

== Coaching career ==
Afable joined the coaching staff of Ateneo Blue Eagles and served for different coaches and win championships, and still currently serving.

When Norman Black was later hired by the Talk 'N Text Tropang Texters, he also joined with Sandy Arespacochaga. When Black's reassigned to Meralco, he also joined, and stayed even Black was demoted to consultant.
