= K2P =

K2P may refer to:

- Two-pore-domain potassium channel (K_{2P}), a family of cell membrane leak channels
- Kimura's two parameter model (K2P model), a model of DNA evolution
- Centretown (postal code K2P), Ottawa, Ontario, Canada; see List of postal codes of Canada: K

== See also ==
- Dipotassium phosphate (K_{2}HPO_{4})
- 2KP (684 AM), ABC Mid North Coast, Port Macquarie, Mid North Coast, New South Wales, Australia; a radio station
- KP2
- KKP (disambiguation)
- KPP (disambiguation)
- KP (disambiguation)
