= Isaac Go =

Filipino basketball player (born 1996)

No. 11 – Barangay Ginebra San Miguel
- Position: Center
- League: PBA

Personal information
- Born: June 7, 1996 (age 30) Quezon City, Philippines
- Listed height: 6 ft 7 in (2.01 m)
- Listed weight: 230 lb (104 kg)

Career information
- High school: Xavier School (San Juan, Philippines)
- College: Ateneo
- PBA draft: 2019: Special round1st overall (Note: The 2019 draft was composed of two drafts: the Gilas special draft, which consists of 5 players reserved for the Philippine national team, and the regular draft. Go was selected as the first pick in the Gilas special draft. Roosevelt Adams was selected as the first pick of the regular draft.)
- Drafted by: Columbian Dyip
- Playing career: 2019–present

Career history
- 2021–2024: Terrafirma Dyip
- 2024–present: Barangay Ginebra San Miguel

Career highlights
- PBA champion (2026 Commissioner's); 3× UAAP champion (2017–2019); Filoil Flying V Preseason Cup champion (2018); 2× PCCL champion (2018, 2019); PCCL Finals MVP (2018); PBA D-League champion (2019 Aspirants' Cup); PBA D-League MVP (2019 Aspirants' Cup); PBA D-League Finals MVP (2019 Aspirants' Cup)

George Isaac Yap Go (born June 7, 1996) is a Filipino professional basketball player for the Barangay Ginebra San Miguel of the Philippine Basketball Association (PBA). He is a three-time UAAP champion with the Ateneo Blue Eagles.

== Early life ==
Go wasn't interested in basketball at a young age. However, Gian, his brother, forced Isaac to play with him. In grade school, he had minimal playing time on his team. When he moved up to Xavier High School, he became good enough to represent the Philippines in international tournaments. In 2013, he participated in that year's edition of Adidas Nations. He was also picked for the NBTC All-Star High School Game in 2014, which featured the country's high school standouts. He eventually went to Ateneo for college.

== College career ==
In 2015, Go was part of Ateneo's rookie class that included Aaron Black, Jerie Pingoy, Chibueze Ikeh, and the Nieto brothers Mike and Matt. He could have started playing the previous year, but a shoulder injury kept him out for the whole season. When he joined the team, Coach Tab Balwin put him on a no-rice diet. Since then, he has lost 20 pounds.

In Season 79, Go scored 15 points and 4 rebounds to lead Ateneo in a win against the UST Growling Tigers, which was his college career-high. For that performance, he was awarded Player of the Week. In the Final Four against the FEU Tamaraws, he scored 12 points and 14 to send Ateneo to the Finals. They lost to the DLSU Green Archers in the Finals that season.

In Season 80, Go scored 11 points in the first half against to give UST their 5th straight loss. The Eagles would eventually win all but one game (which was against the Archers) in the elimination round. In their Final Four rematch against FEU, Ateneo lost Game 1. But in Game 2, he tied the game with a three-pointer, and the match went on to overtime. In overtime, he grabbed an offensive rebound and made a bank shot while kneeling on the floor, sealing the game 88–84. The win sent Ateneo back to the Finals. In Game 1, he completed a three-point play that sealed the win for Ateneo. The Eagles lost Game 2, but won Game 3 on a clutch triple from Go, giving Ateneo their first championship since 2012.

As defending champions and Ateneo representing the Philippines in that year's Jones Cup, expectations were high for Ateneo in Season 81. Go played a part in mentoring rookie center Angelo Kouame that season. He scored the most points for Ateneo in a win over the Adamson Soaring Falcons after Adamson beat them in their first match. They beat the UP Fighting Maroons in the Finals.

The following season, Go took a backseat as Ateneo brought in younger rookie big men. Ateneo won its third straight championship that year. At the end of the season, he applied for the PBA Draft.

== Professional career ==
=== Terrafirma Dyip (2021–2024) ===
In the 2019 PBA Draft, Go was selected as the No. 1 overall draft pick by the Columbian Dyip. He was signed ahead of the Governors' Cup restart. He was held scoreless in his PBA debut. Terrafirma failed to qualify for the playoffs that conference.

The following season, during a game against the NorthPort Batang Pier in the Philippine Cup, Go injured his right knee and had to be taken out of the game. He was later diagnosed with a torn anterior cruciate ligament, medial collateral ligament, and meniscus tear. He was out for the rest of the season.

Before the start of the 2024 Philippine Cup, Go signed a season-long deal to stay with Terrafirma. Terrafirma started the conference with a win over the Converge FiberXers in which he contributed 13 points and five rebounds. During All-Star Weekend, he got to participate in the Obstacle Challenge and the 3-Point Shootout for the big men. In an upset win over Barangay Ginebra, he contributed nine points, seven rebounds, and three assists. He then scored a career-high 21 points on seven made three-pointers in a loss to the San Miguel Beermen. Terrafirma made it back to the postseason that conference with a win over NorthPort. In Game 1 of the quarterfinals against the San Miguel Beermen, he scored a new a career-high 22 points on six triples as Terrafirma forced a winner-take-all game. The Beermen bounced back the following game and won 110–91 to end Terrafirma's season.

=== Barangay Ginebra San Miguel (2024–present) ===
On July 13, 2024, Go, along with Stephen Holt and a 2023 first-round pick, was traded to the Barangay Ginebra San Miguel for Stanley Pringle, Christian Standhardinger, and a 2023 first-round pick.

During the 2024 Governors' Cup, Go injured his knee in a win over the Rain or Shine Elasto Painters. He would not return for the rest of that conference.

On August 2, 2025, Go signed a one-year contract extension with the team.

== PBA career statistics ==
Legend
GP	Games played	MPG	Minutes per game	FG%	Field-goal percentage
3FG%	3-point field-goal percentage	4P%	4-point field-goal percentage	FT%	Free-throw percentage
RPG	Rebounds per game	APG	Assists per game	SPG	Steals per game
BPG	Blocks per game	PPG	Points per game	127	Career high

As of the end of 2024–25 season

=== Season-by-season averages ===
Year	Team	GP	MPG	FG%	3P%	4P%	FT%	RPG	APG	SPG	BPG	PPG
2021	Terrafirma	6	12.5	.462	.200	—	.333	2.8	.2	—	.2	4.7
2022–23	Terrafirma	2	7.2	.400	.333	—	.000	2.5	.0	.5	—	4.5
2023–24	Terrafirma	25	24.7	.413	.366	—	.565	5.2	1.2	.4	.7	8.8
2024–25	Barangay Ginebra	7	13.5	.263	.167	.000	—	2.3	.4	.6	.9	3.1
Career		40	20.0	.396	.328	.000	.519	4.2	.9	.4	.6	7.0

== National team career ==
Go first played for the Philippine national team in the 2011 FIBA Asia U-16 Tournament. In 2018, He was named to the "23 for 23" a pool of Gilas Cadets for the 2023 FIBA World Cup. He also played in the 2021 FIBA Asia Cup qualifiers, even serving as team captain during the third window. He was also on the roster for the 2020 FIBA Olympic Qualifying Tournament.

In non-FIBA tournaments, he has represented the Philippines in the Dubai International Basketball Championship (DIBC) with Mighty Sports, winning it in 2020. As a member of Ateneo, he participated in the 2018 Jones Cup. His best game in that tournament came against Indonesia, with 21 points of 6-of-7 shooting from beyond the arc. Ateneo finished 4th in that tournament.

In 2022, he was on the roster for the 31st Southeast Asian Games in Vietnam. He had 13 points and 12 rebounds in a win against Cambodia. Gilas went on to lose to Indonesia in the finals, settling for a silver medal.

== Off the court ==
Go is also a writer for the Philippine edition of NBA.com. He also appears on Philippine sports talk shows such as NBA Hype, and The Game. In 2022, he became an analyst for UAAP Season 84.

He graduated with the degree of BS Management of Applied Chemistry (BS MAC) from Ateneo de Manila University in 2020. He also holds a master's degree in Sustainability Management.
