= Sandy Arespacochaga =

Filipino basketball coach

TNT Tropang 5G
- Position: Assistant coach
- League: PBA

Personal information
- Born: April 6, 1975 (age 51)

Career information
- College: Ateneo
- Coaching career: 1998–present

Career history

Coaching
- 1998–2003: Ateneo (assistant)
- 2004: Ateneo
- 2005–2015: Ateneo (assistant)
- 2012–2014: Talk N Text Tropang Texters (assistant)
- 2014–2019: NLEX Road Warriors (assistant)
- 2016: Ateneo
- 2016–present: Ateneo (assistant)
- 2019: Philippines U-19
- 2019–present: TNT Tropang Giga (assistant)
- 2026–present: Philippines U-19 (women)

Career highlights
- As assistant coach: 4× PBA champion (2012–13 Philippine, 2023 Governors', 2024 Governors', 2024–25 Commissioner's); PBA D-League champion (2019 Aspirants' Cup); 2022 World University Basketball Series (WUBS) champion; AsiaBasket champion (2023 Las Piñas); 10× UAAP Seniors champion (2002, 2008–2012, 2017–2019, 2022); 2x Filoil Flying V Cup champion (2011, 2018); 5× PCCL champion (2007, 2009, 2010, 2018, 2019)

Alexander "Sandy" Arespacochaga (born April 6, 1977) is a former collegiate basketball player who currently serves as an assistant coach for the of Ateneo Blue Eagles, and TNT Tropang 5G.

== Career ==
=== Ateneo ===
Arespacochaga played for the Blue Eagles from 1993 to 1997. He served as the head coach of the team twice, first in 2004, at the age of 29, with Norman Black as its consultant. After Black's reassignment to Talk and Text, and joining him in 2012, Arespacochaga was also a top candidate to be the next head coach, but Bo Perasol was chosen.

He returned as head coach in 2016 with Tab Baldwin as consultant, but only for a short period as Baldwin formally takes over and reappointing him as assistant coach.

=== PBA ===
Arespacochaga joined Norman Black in Talk 'N Text Tropang Texters in 2012. In 2014, after Black's reassignment to Meralco Bolts, he was designated to be an assistant coach to Boyet Fernandez at NLEX Road Warriors. In 2019, he returned to the now-TNT Tropang Giga (formerly Talk 'N Text).

=== Batang Gilas ===
He was appointed in Batang Gilas (Philippines U-19) in 2019, replacing Josh Reyes.

== Coaching record ==
=== Collegiate record ===
Season	Team	Eliminations				Playoffs				
Season	Team	W	L	PCT	Finish	PG	W	L	PCT	Results
2004	Ateneo	10	4	.714	3rd	2	0	2	.000	Semifinals
2016	Ateneo	4	3	.571	2nd	—	—	—	—	(Reassigned)
Totals		14	7	.667		2	0	2	.000	0 championships
