= Ford Arao =

Filipino basketball player and coach (born 1984)

Ateneo Blue Eagles
- Title: Assistant coach
- League: UAAP

Personal information
- Born: October 29, 1984 (age 42)
- Listed height: 6 ft 6 in (1.98 m)
- Listed weight: 210 lb (95 kg)

Career information
- High school: San Beda (Manila)
- College: Ateneo
- PBA draft: 2010: 2nd round, 14th overall pick
- Drafted by: Meralco Bolts
- Playing career: 2010–2016
- Position: Center / power forward
- Coaching career: 2014–present

Career history

Playing
- 2010: Meralco Bolts
- 2016: Byaheng SCTEX

Coaching
- 2014: San Beda (assistant)
- 2014–2022: NLEX Road Warriors (assistant)
- 2016–present: Ateneo (assistant)
- 2018–2019: Philippines (assistant)
- 2024–present: Ateneo JHS

Career highlights
- As assistant coach: AsiaBasket champion (2023 Las Piñas); Filoil Flying V Cup champion (2018); 2x PCCL champion (2018, 2019); PBA D-League champion (2019 Aspirants' Cup); 2022 World University Basketball Series (WUBS) champion; 4× UAAP champion (2017, 2018, 2019, 2022); NCAA men's champion (2014); As player: NCAA juniors' champion (2002); NCAA juniors' Mythical Five (2002)

Claiford A. Arao (born October 29, 1984) is a Filipino professional basketball coach and former player. He was the fourteenth overall draft pick by Meralco in the 2010 PBA draft. He played for the Ateneo Blue Eagles during his collegiate career, in which he now serves as an assistant coach.

== Playing career ==
Arao played high school basketball in San Beda College High School. The San Beda Red Cubs won the 2002 NCAA juniors' basketball title with Arao as their starting center. Arao then played collegiate basketball in Ateneo de Manila University from 2003 to 2007. The Ateneo Blue Eagles reached the UAAP finals in 2003 and 2006, and fell short each time.

Arao was drafted by the Meralco Bolts in the 2010 PBA Draft. Arao played only one game in the Philippine Basketball Association. He played for three minutes, without registering anything from that lone game.

In 2016, Arao returned to playing competitive basketball as he signed with Byaheng SCTEX of the Pilipinas Commercial Basketball League.

== Coaching career ==
During Boyet Fernandez's first coaching stint with San Beda, Arao was one of his assistant coaches.

Arao was chosen as one of Yeng Guiao's deputies in the Philippine national team during the buildup for the 2018 Asian Games and 2019 FIBA World Cup qualifiers.

In 2024, he was appointed as head coach of the Ateneo High School basketball team.

== PBA career statistics ==
Legend
GP	Games played	MPG	Minutes per game
FG%	Field-goal percentage	3P%	3-point field-goal percentage	FT%	Free-throw percentage
RPG	Rebounds per game	APG	Assists per game	SPG	Steals per game
BPG	Blocks per game	PPG	Points per game	**Bold**	Career high

=== Season-by-season averages ===
Year	Team	GP	MPG	FG%	3P%	FT%	RPG	APG	SPG	BPG	PPG
2010–11	Meralco	1	3.0	.000	.000	.000	.0	.0	.0	.0	.0
Career		1	3.0	.000	.000	.000	.0	.0	.0	.0	.0
