= Alton Lister =

American basketball player and coach (born 1958)

Ateneo Blue Eagles
- Title: Assistant coach
- League: UAAP

Personal information
- Born: October 1, 1958 (age 68) Dallas, Texas, U.S.
- Listed height: 7 ft 0 in (2.13 m)
- Listed weight: 245 lb (111 kg)

Career information
- High school: Woodrow Wilson (Dallas, Texas)
- College: San Jacinto (1976–1977); Arizona State (1978–1981)
- NBA draft: 1981: 1st round, 21st overall pick
- Drafted by: Milwaukee Bucks
- Playing career: 1981–1998
- Position: Center
- Number: 53
- Coaching career: 2000–present

Career history

Playing
- 1981–1986: Milwaukee Bucks
- 1986–1989: Seattle SuperSonics
- 1989–1993: Golden State Warriors
- 1994–1995: Milwaukee Bucks
- 1995–1997: Boston Celtics
- 1997–1998: Portland Trail Blazers

Coaching
- 2000–2007: Mesa Community College
- 2007–2008: Atlanta Hawks (assistant)
- 2009–2012: San Miguel Beermen (skills coach)
- 2016–2021: Tropang TNT / TNT Katropa / TNT Tropang Giga (assistant)
- 2016–present: Ateneo (assistant)

Career highlights
- As Player: First-team All-Pac-10 (1981); No. 53 jersey retired by Arizona State Sun Devils; As Assistant Coach: PBA champion (2021 Philippine); 4× UAAP champion (2017–2019, 2022); Filoil Flying V Cup champion (2018); 2x PCCL champion (2018, 2019); PBA D-League champion (2019 Aspirants' Cup); 2022 World University Basketball Series (WUBS) champion; AsiaBasket champion (2023 Las Piñas)

Career NBA statistics
- Points: 6,298 (6.6 ppg)
- Rebounds: 5,996 (6.3 rpg)
- Blocks: 1,473 (1.5 bpg)
- Stats at NBA.com
- Stats at Basketball Reference

Alton Lavelle Lister (born October 1, 1958) is an American former professional basketball player. He is currently serving as an assistant coach for the Ateneo Blue Eagles in the University Athletic Association of the Philippines (UAAP).

Lister graduated from Woodrow Wilson High School (in the Lakewood section of Dallas) in 1976, where he led the Wildcats to many victories and was an All-American and All-State team member. He was inducted into Woodrow's Hall of Fame in 1990.

== College ==
The 7' 0" Lister played at San Jacinto Junior College, where he was a teammate of future NBA journeyman shooting guard Oliver Mack. He led the Dragons in rebounding and received All-American honors. He later transferred to Arizona State, becoming teammates with future NBA player Byron Scott. Lister's senior season averages of 15.4 points and 9.7 rebounds contributed to the Sun Devils having a school record of 16–2 in the Pac-10 and 24–4 overall and being ranked fifth in the nation for the 1980–1981 season. The season, capped with a win over the top-ranked then-undefeated Oregon State, had Lister earn honorable mention All-America honors by the Associated Press and Street & Smith's, All-Pac-10 honors, and his team's Most Improved Player award.

A two-year starter in his three years with Arizona State, Lister was inducted into the Arizona State Hall of Fame in 2000 after a career that saw him average 8.2 rebounds and post 148 career blocks. Lister as a member of the 1980 USA Olympic basketball team was the second Sun Devil to be selected for the United States Olympic team. However, he was unable to participate due to the United States Olympic Committee's decision to boycott the 1980 Moscow Olympic Games on the orders of President Jimmy Carter. He did however receive one of 461 Congressional Gold Medals created especially for the spurned athletes.

== Professional ==
Lister was selected by the Milwaukee Bucks in the first round (21st overall) of the 1981 NBA draft. He would consider Bob Lanier his mentor during his time with the Bucks, where he averaged around 8.1 ppg, 7 rpg and 1.8 bpg while only playing 24 minutes a night in his five-year stint with the Bucks. In the 1982–83 season, Lister received 5 points in the NBA MVP voting even though he only averaged 8.4 points and 7.1 rebounds and started in 37 games. Each of the five seasons he played in Milwaukee ended with them winning the Central Division, though they did not reach the NBA Finals during his tenure.

After the 1986 season he was dealt to Seattle for Jack Sikma. His best year as a professional came during the 1986–87 season as a member of the SuperSonics, appearing in 75 games and averaging 11.6 ppg, 9.4 rpg and 2.4 bpg. After three seasons with the Sonics, he was traded straight up to the Warriors for their first-round pick. Lister would go on to play another four years with Golden State, though playing sparingly in due to injuries. He was waived by the Warriors in March 1993 and went on to sign with Milwaukee. After one more season with the Bucks, the then 37-year-old Lister went to the Boston Celtics, as part of the Todd Day for Sherman Douglas trade. He spent two seasons in Boston on a $800,000 total salary averaging 1.9 ppg. Lister finished his career with seven games for the Portland Trail Blazers.

In his NBA career, Lister played in 953 games (incidentally, the second most games ever for a player with jersey #53, behind Artis Gilmore) and scored a total of 6,298 points. He wore jersey #53 his entire career, and was best known as a solid rebounder and shot blocker.

== NBA career statistics ==
Legend
| GP | Games played | GS | Games started | MPG | Minutes per game |
| FG% | Field goal percentage | 3P% | 3-point field goal percentage | FT% | Free throw percentage |
| RPG | Rebounds per game | APG | Assists per game | SPG | Steals per game |
| BPG | Blocks per game | PPG | Points per game | **Bold** | Career high |
| * | Led the league |

=== Regular season ===
| Year | Team | GP | GS | MPG | FG% | 3P% | FT% | RPG | APG | SPG | BPG | PPG |
|---|---|---|---|---|---|---|---|---|---|---|---|---|
| 1981–82 | Milwaukee | 80 | 23 | 14.8 | .519 | .000 | .520 | 4.8 | 1.1 | 0.2 | 1.5 | 4.5 |
| 1982–83 | Milwaukee | 80 | 37 | 23.6 | .529 | .000 | .537 | 7.1 | 1.4 | **0.6** | 2.2 | 8.4 |
| 1983–84 | Milwaukee | **82*** | 72 | 23.8 | .500 | .000 | .626 | 7.4 | 1.3 | 0.5 | 1.7 | 7.6 |
| 1984–85 | Milwaukee | 81 | 80 | 25.8 | .538 | .000 | .588 | 8.0 | **1.6** | **0.6** | 2.1 | 9.9 |
| 1985–86 | Milwaukee | 81 | 19 | 22.4 | .551 | .000 | .602 | 7.3 | 1.2 | **0.6** | 1.8 | 9.8 |
| 1986–87 | Seattle | 75 | 75 | **30.5** | .504 | .000 | .675 | **9.4** | 1.5 | 0.4 | **2.4** | **11.6** |
| 1987–88 | Seattle | **82** | 55 | 22.1 | .504 | **.500** | .606 | 7.6 | 0.7 | 0.3 | 1.7 | 5.6 |
| 1988–89 | Seattle | **82*** | **82** | 22.0 | .499 | .000 | .646 | 6.6 | 0.7 | 0.3 | 2.2 | 8.0 |
| 1989–90 | Golden State | 3 | 0 | 13.3 | .500 | .000 | .571 | 2.7 | 0.7 | 0.3 | 0.0 | 4.0 |
| 1990–91 | Golden State | 77 | 65 | 20.2 | .478 | .000 | .569 | 6.3 | 1.2 | 0.3 | 1.2 | 6.4 |
| 1991–92 | Golden State | 26 | 12 | 11.3 | **.557** | .000 | .424 | 3.5 | 0.5 | 0.2 | 0.6 | 3.9 |
| 1992–93 | Golden State | 20 | 9 | 8.7 | .452 | .000 | .538 | 2.2 | 0.3 | 0.0 | 0.5 | 2.3 |
| 1994–95 | Milwaukee | 60 | 32 | 12.9 | .493 | .000 | .500 | 3.9 | 0.2 | 0.3 | 1.0 | 2.8 |
| 1995–96 | Milwaukee | 7 | 5 | 12.6 | .444 | .000 | **1.000** | 4.1 | 0.6 | 0.0 | 0.4 | 1.4 |
| 1995–96 | Boston | 57 | 14 | 11.4 | .490 | .000 | .629 | 4.4 | 0.3 | 0.1 | 0.7 | 2.3 |
| 1996–97 | Boston | 53 | 2 | 9.7 | .416 | .000 | .742 | 3.2 | 0.2 | 0.2 | 0.3 | 1.6 |
| 1997–98 | Portland | 7 | 0 | 6.3 | .375 | .000 | .000 | 1.6 | 0.1 | 0.1 | 0.1 | 0.9 |
| Career | | 953 | 582 | 19.9 | .512 | .111 | .597 | 6.3 | 1.0 | 0.4 | 1.5 | 6.6 |

=== Playoffs ===
| Year | Team | GP | GS | MPG | FG% | 3P% | FT% | RPG | APG | SPG | BPG | PPG |
|---|---|---|---|---|---|---|---|---|---|---|---|---|
| 1981–82 | Milwaukee | 6 | - | 18.7 | .583 | .000 | .714 | 4.5 | 0.8 | 0.3 | 2.5 | 5.5 |
| 1982–83 | Milwaukee | 9 | - | 22.9 | .429 | .000 | .800 | 6.8 | 1.2 | **1.0** | 1.7 | 6.4 |
| 1983–84 | Milwaukee | **16** | - | 23.0 | .500 | .000 | .625 | 6.0 | 0.6 | 0.3 | 1.5 | 6.8 |
| 1984–85 | Milwaukee | 8 | **8** | **25.4** | .450 | .000 | .469 | **7.8** | **1.9** | 0.8 | 1.9 | 8.6 |
| 1985–86 | Milwaukee | 14 | 1 | 23.9 | .641 | .000 | .603 | 6.9 | 0.9 | 0.5 | 1.6 | **11.9** |
| 1986–87 | Seattle | 9 | 7 | 22.9 | .400 | .000 | .700 | 6.2 | 0.8 | 0.8 | 1.4 | 6.0 |
| 1987–88 | Seattle | 5 | 5 | 15.4 | **.706** | .000 | .800 | 5.8 | 1.0 | 0.2 | 1.0 | 5.6 |
| 1988–89 | Seattle | 8 | **8** | 20.0 | .436 | .000 | **.846** | 4.8 | 0.3 | 0.3 | **2.6** | 7.0 |
| 1990–91 | Golden State | 6 | 5 | 12.0 | .480 | .000 | .400 | 4.7 | 0.3 | 0.0 | 1.2 | 4.3 |
| 1991–92 | Golden State | 4 | 3 | 11.8 | .400 | .000 | .800 | 2.8 | 0.3 | 0.0 | 1.0 | 4.0 |
| 1997–98 | Portland | 2 | 0 | 5.5 | .333 | .000 | .000 | 1.0 | 0.0 | 0.0 | 0.5 | 1.0 |
| Career | | 87 | 37 | 20.7 | .505 | .000 | .640 | 5.8 | 0.8 | 0.4 | 1.6 | 7.1 |

== Coach ==
In 2000, Lister became head coach of at Mesa Community College. From a 9–21 season before his arrival, Lister had five consecutive seasons of 20 or more wins. In the seven years Lister served as coach, 30 players went on to play for NCAA Division I schools. While coaching at Mesa, Lister spent six summers at Pete Newell's Big Man's Camp. The Atlanta Hawks were impressed with Lister's work at the Newell's camps, thus paving the way for Billy Knight's recruitment of Lister as assistant coach to Mike Woodson in 2007.

In November 2008, upon the recommendation of Paul Howard, he was hired as skills coach to the San Miguel Beermen of the Philippine Basketball Association (PBA).

== Personal life ==
Lister lives in the Philippines with his daughter Avary, working as the skills coach of the Meralco Bolts. He has four children in the US, namely Alton Jr., Alexa, JRoss, and Amari.

Although retired, Lister has coached aspiring basketball players in the San Diego, California area. On July 17, 2015, Lister was the keynote speaker at the California State Games in San Diego, CA, at Qualcomm Stadium. In January 2016, he joined Tropang TNT as an assistant coach.

Lister's deceased brother James, a 6'9", 225-pound center from Sam Houston State, was drafted by the Cleveland Cavaliers in the third round of the 1973 NBA draft, but he never played in the NBA. He played as an import in the Philippines (in 1981 for the PBA's CDCP Road Builders in 7 games) and in Belgium for 13 years.

== See also ==
- List of National Basketball Association career blocks leaders
