= KPKP =

KPKP may refer to:

- Progressive Women's Political Club (KPKP; Polish: Klub Polityczny Kobiet Postępowych) of Poland
- Kunguma Poovum Konjum Puravum, a 2009 Indian film abbreviated as "KPKP"

== See also ==
- 2KP
- KP2 (disambiguation)
- KP (disambiguation)
