= Kouame =

Kouame is both a given name and a surname. Notable people with the name include:

- Kouame Aholou (born 1970), Togolese sprinter
- Kouame Autonne (born 2000), Ivorian-Emirati footballer
- Kouamé Botué (born 2002), Ivorian footballer
- Kouamé Lougué, Burkinabé politician
- Kouame N'Douba (born 1964), Ivorian sprint canoer
- Kouamé Ouattara (born 1991), Ivorian footballer
- Adjoua Flore Kouamé (born 1964), Ivorian novelist
- Akissi Kouamé (1955–2022), Ivorian army officer
- Alexander Kouame (born 1988), Ivorian footballer
- Ange Kouamé (born 1996), Ivorian footballer
- Ange Kouame (born 1997), Ivorian-Filipino basketball player
- Axel Kouame (born 2003), Ivorian footballer
- Basile Aka Kouamé (born 1963), Ivorian footballer
- Bruno Kouamé (1927–2021), Ivorian bishop
- Christian Kouamé (born 1997), Ivorian footballer
- Djems Kouamé (born 1989), Canadian football player
- Eugène Koffi Kouamé (1988–2017), Ivorian footballer
- Koffi Kouamé (born 1995), Ivorian footballer
- Koli Kouame, Ivorian United Nations official
- Rominigue Kouamé (born 1996), Ivorian footballer
- Taky Marie-Divine Kouamé, French cyclist
- Valentin Kouamé, Burkinabé footballer
- Kouassi Kouamé Patrice (born 1962), Ivorian politician
