= KP2 =

KP2 may refer to:

== Groups, organizations ==
- Kore Potash (stock ticker KP2), a mining company
- KP2, a military unit, a company in the His Majesty the King's Guard (Norwegian: Hans Majestet Kongens Garde) of the Norwegian Army

== Biology ==
- KP.2, a SARS-CoV-2 Omicron variant of the FLiRT subvariant family, the virus that causes COVID-19, causing disease in 2024 in Singapore and the United States
- Drulisvirus Kp2, see List of virus species

== Products ==
- Pickering-Pearson KP.2, an airplane; see List of aircraft (Pi–Pz)
- Korg Kaoss Pad KP2, see List of Korg products

== Other uses ==
- KP2 control tone for the AT&T phone system, used acoustically to hack with the blue box

== See also ==
- 2KP (684 AM), ABC Mid North Coast, Port Macquarie, Mid North Coast, New South Wales, Australia; a radio station
- K2P (disambiguation)
- KPP (disambiguation)
- KP (disambiguation)
