= ABC Coffs Coast =

Australian radio station

Coordinates: 30°17′51.9″S 153°7′0.36″E

Australia
- Broadcast area: Coffs Harbour
- Frequency: 92.3 mHz FM

Programming
- Format: Talk

Ownership
- Owner: Australian Broadcasting Corporation

History
- First air date: 2008

Links
- Website: https://www.abc.net.au/coffscoast/

ABC Coffs Coast is an ABC Local Radio station based in Coffs Harbour and broadcasting to the Coffs Coast region in New South Wales, Australia.

== History ==
Originally part of ABC Mid North Coast, the ABC set up a bureau at 24 Gordon Street in Coffs Harbour in 1994, which then evolved into a broadcasting studio with a wide range of services. Due to high demand, the bureau decided to break off from the ABC Mid North Coast and become ABC Coffs Coast.

The studio had to be rebuilt twice, both times due to floods, in November 1996 and April 2009.

== Local Programs ==
=== Weekdays ===
- Breakfast with Fiona Poole – 6:00 AM to 10:00 AM

When local programs are not broadcast the station is a relay of ABC Mid North Coast and 702 ABC Sydney.

== See also ==
- List of radio stations in Australia
