= Thirdy Ravena =

Filipino basketball player (born 1996)

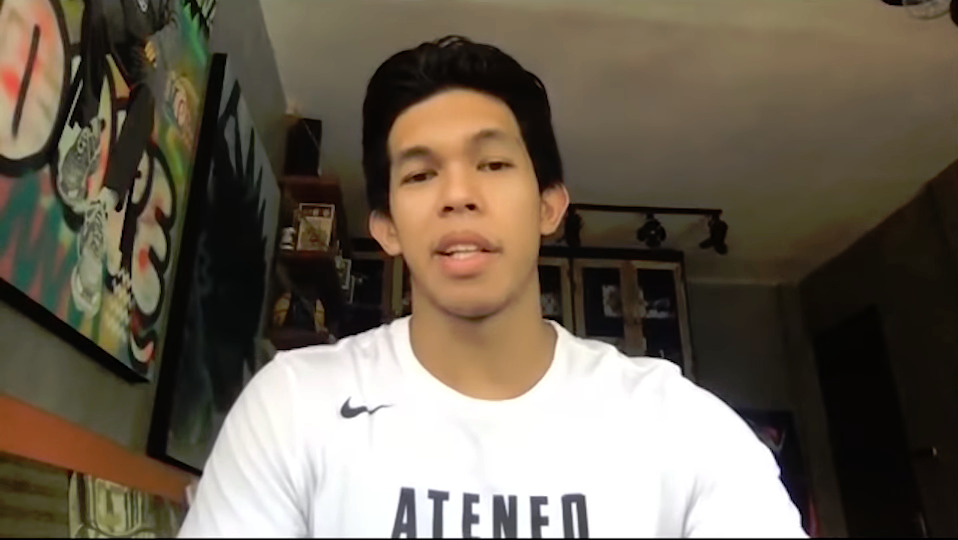
- Ravena in 2020

No. 0 – Toyama Grouses
- Position: Shooting guard
- League: B.League

Personal information
- Born: December 17, 1996 (age 29) Iloilo City, Philippines
- Listed height: 6 ft 2 in (189 cm)
- Listed weight: 205 lb (93 kg)

Career information
- High school: Ateneo (Quezon City)
- College: Ateneo (2014–2019)
- Playing career: 2020–present

Career history
- 2020–2024: San-en NeoPhoenix
- 2024–2025: Dubai Basketball
- 2026–present: Toyama Grouses

Career highlights
- B.League All-Star (2020); B.League Impressive Asia Player Of The Year (2024); B.League Asia All Star (2023, 2024); 3x UAAP champion (2017–2019); 3x UAAP Finals MVP (2017–2019); 2x UAAP Mythical Team (2016, 2017); PCCL champion (2018); PCCL Mythical Team (2018); Filoil Flying V Cup champion (2018); PBA D-League champion (2019 Aspirants' Cup); Filoil Flying V Cup Mythical Team (2018); College Basketball Awards MVP (2019)

Ferdinand "Thirdy" Crisologo Ravena III (born December 17, 1996) is a Filipino professional basketball player for Toyama Grouses of the Japanese B.League. Ravena played college basketball for the Ateneo Blue Eagles of the UAAP. He plays the shooting guard position and is listed at 6 ft 2 in (1.89 m).

== Early life ==
Ravena was born on December 17, 1996, in Iloilo City, Philippines. He is the son of Bong Ravena, who played for the UE Red Warriors and was the 1992 PBA Rookie of the year and Mozzy Crisologo-Ravena, a retired volleyball player who used to play for the UST Golden Tigresses and the Philippines women's national volleyball team. He is also the younger brother of Kiefer Ravena, who is a basketball player for the Ryukyu Golden Kings in Japan's B.League, and the older brother of Dani Ravena, who played for the Ateneo Lady Eagles. and in the Premier Volleyball League.

== Collegiate career ==
=== UAAP Season 77 (2014) ===
Ravena's rookie season was in 2014 alongside his brother Kiefer Ravena. There was a lot of hype surrounding Thirdy's rookie season as he was considered the future of the league. Unfortunately, Thirdy had one of the worst seasons of his up-and-coming college career, as he only averaged 1.4 points and 1.6 rebounds in seven minutes per game.

=== UAAP Season 78 (2015) ===
This was supposed to be Thirdy's second year but he had to sit out because of bad grades. It is in the rules of Ateneo sports that you can not play in any league (even if not UAAP) if you have a failing mark.

=== UAAP Season 79 (2016) ===
This was officially Thirdy's second playing year where he led the Blue Eagles to the 2nd Seed with a 10–4 win loss record and faced the FEU Tamaraws in the semifinals. He helped Ateneo advance to the finals against their archrivals the De La Salle Green Archers in a 2–0 series win by the Green Archers.

=== UAAP Season 80 (2017) ===
With Thirdy having experienced two years in the UAAP, he led the Blue Eagles to the 1st seed with a 13–1 win–loss record. They once again faced FEU in the semifinals and were in the brink of elimination despite having the twice-to-beat advantage. They faced La Salle in the finals again but this time triumphant winning 2–1 in the best of three finals series. Thirdy grabbed the Finals MVP honors with Ateneo's ninth championship.

=== UAAP Season 81 (2018) ===
As defending champions and with Ateneo representing the Philippines in that year's Jones Cup, expectations were high for Ateneo. Everyone thought they would sweep it but they lost their first game of the season to the Adamson Soaring Falcons. After that loss, the Blue Eagles led by Thirdy were fired up and did their best ending with a 12–2 record. Ateneo faced FEU again and won in one game. Thirdy again led Ateneo to back-to-back titles, 10th overall against the UP Fighting Maroons. Thirdy won Finals MVP for the second time in a row with a historical 38 point performance in Game 2 of the UAAP Finals.

=== UAAP Season 82 (2019) ===
For Thirdy's final year in the UAAP, he led Ateneo to a 14–0 season sweep and booked them an automatic trip to the finals. For the finals they faced the UST Growling Tigers. Beating them in 2 games for a three-peat and Ateneo's 11th title. Thirdy won Finals MVP for the third straight time (first in UAAP history). Thirdy's 32 point game in Game 1 of the Finals sealed the case for Thirdy's third straight Finals MVP trophy.

== Professional career ==
=== San-en NeoPhoenix (2020–2024) ===
On June 24, 2020, San-en NeoPhoenix of the B.League announced that it has signed Ravena for the 2020–21 season. He is the first ever player to be signed-in under the league's Asian Player Quotas system which involve non-Japanese Asian imports. Due to travel restrictions imposed as a response to the COVID-19 pandemic, Ravena was only able to leave the Philippines for Japan in October 2020.

In his debut for the San-en NeoPhoenix, he put up 13 points, 3 rebounds, and 3 assists in an 83–82 win over the Shimane Susanoo Magic. On November 27, 2020, Ravena tested positive for COVID-19 after exhibiting fever which temporarily sidelined him from playing. He rejoined NeoPhoenix, after the team announced that he has recovered by December 11. In January 2021, Thirdy Ravena suffered a finger fracture and missed at least 3 months of B-league games. Ravena played 18 games in his first year with the NeoPhoenix, averaging 9.1 points, 3.6 rebounds, and 1.6 assists in 22.8 minutes per game.

On May 10, 2021, Ravena signed a multi-year contract extension with the NeoPhoenix. On October 2, he faced his brother Kiefer and the Shiga Lakestars during the first game of the season, recording 11 points and 6 rebounds in a 93–83 loss.

=== Dubai Basketball (2024–2025) ===
On July 30, 2024, Ravena signed a one-year contract with Emirati club Dubai Basketball, which competes in the Europe-based ABA League. He played 18 games for Dubai in the 2024–25 season where he averaged 0.9 points in 68 minutes. Ravena was not rostered for the 2025–26 season and in October 2025, he reportedly left Dubai.

== National team career ==
Ravena has played for the Philippine national team at the 2019 FIBA Basketball World Cup Asian qualifiers.

He was included in the 21-man pool for the 2023 FIBA World Cup. However, he was not included in the 12-man final roster.

== Career statistics ==
Legend
GP	Games played	GS	Games started	MPG	Minutes per game
FG%	Field goal percentage	3P%	3-point field goal percentage	FT%	Free throw percentage
RPG	Rebounds per game	APG	Assists per game	SPG	Steals per game
BPG	Blocks per game	PPG	Points per game		Led the league

=== Domestic leagues ===
As of the end of the 2024–25 season

Year	Team	League	GP	MPG	FG%	3P%	FT%	RPG	APG	SPG	BPG	PPG
2020–21	(Japan) San-en NeoPhoenix	B.League	18	22.8	.358	.273	.541	3.6	1.6	.7	.2	9.1
2021–22	(Japan) San-en NeoPhoenix	B.League	46	24.5	.425	.275	.684	3.7	2.5	1.0	.2	11.4
2022–23	(Japan) San-en NeoPhoenix	B.League	60	26.1	.434	.238	.677	4.8	4.3	1.1	.1	11.5
2023–24	(Japan) San-en NeoPhoenix	B.League	59	27.1	.522	.256	.750	5.0	2.8	1.0	.3	12.5
2024–25	(United Arab Emirates) BC Dubai	ABA	18	4.1	.240	.125	.750	.6	.1	.2	.1	.9
