= KKP =

KKP may refer to:

- Communist Party of Kurdistan (Turkish: Kürdistan Komünist Partisi)
- Confederation of the Polish Crown (Polish: Konfederacja Korony Polskiej)
- Christian Conservative Party (Norwegian: Kristent Konservativt Parti)
- Kadhalum Kadandhu Pogum, a 2016 Indian film
- Kamgar Kisan Paksha, now defunct political party of India
- Stock symbol for Kiatnakin Bank, a Thai bank
- Postal code for Kirkop, Malta
- ISO 639 code for the Koko-Bera language, an Australian Aboriginal language
- Kouassi Kouamé Patrice, a politician from Ivory Coast
- Kung Kao Po, a Chinese-language newspaper in Hong Kong
- National Coordinating Commission (Polish: Krajowa Komisja Porozumiewawcza), the executive branch of the Solidarity trade union
- Philippsburg Nuclear Power Plant (German: Kernkraftwerk Philippsburg)
- Ministry of Marine Affairs and Fisheries (Indonesia) (Indonesian: Kementerian Kelautan dan Perikanan)

== See also ==
- Kappa Kappa Psi, a fraternity for college and university band members in the United States, akso known as KKPsi
- KK thesis, or KK principle, can be stated as: "Kp→KKp" (Knowing p implies the knowing of knowing p)
