= KP4 =

KP4, Kp4 or kp4 may refer to

- Killer toxin Kp4 family, a family of killer toxins, which includes the Kp4 killer toxin from the smut fungus Ustilago maydis
- KP4, an amateur radio call sign assigned to operators in Puerto Rico, see Amateur radio licensing in the United States#Call signs
- Witness (#KP4), Katy Perry's fifth studio album

== See also ==
- KP (disambiguation)
