= Tab Baldwin =

American-New Zealand basketball coach

Tab Baldwin ONZM
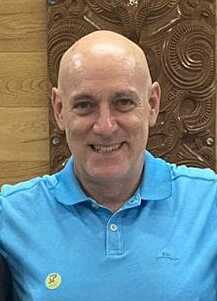
- Baldwin in 2023

Personal information
- Born: 16 May 1958 (age 68) Jacksonville, Florida, U.S.

Career information
- College: University of Notre Dame
- Coaching career: 1983–present

Career history

Coaching
- 1989–1990: Otago Nuggets
- 1994–2001: Auckland Stars
- 1996: Malaysia
- 2001–2006: New Zealand
- 2007: P.A.O.K. BC
- 2007–2009: U Mobitelco Cluj-Napoca
- 2010–2011: Lebanon
- 2011: Club Sportif Sagesse
- 2011–2012: Jordan
- 2012–2013: Fujian Sturgeons
- 2013: Hawke's Bay Hawks
- 2013–2014: Philippines (as team consultant)
- 2015–2016: Philippines
- 2016–2026: Ateneo de Manila
- 2021–2022: Philippines

Career highlights
- New Zealand Basketball Hall of Fame (Class of 2023); 5x NBL champion (1995–1997, 1999–2000); 4× NBL Coach of the Year (1995, 1997, 1999, 2014); 2× Halberg Awards Coach of the Year (2001, 2002); 4× UAAP champion (2017, 2018, 2019, 2022); 2× UAAP Men's Basketball Coach of the Year (2019, 2022); 2018 Breakdown Basketball Invitationals champion; 2018 City Hoops champion; Filoil Flying V Cup champion (2018); 2x PCCL champion (2018, 2019); PBA D-League champion (2019 Aspirants' Cup); 2022 World University Basketball Series (WUBS) champion; AsiaBasket champion (2023 Las Piñas); AsiaBasket Coach of the Tournament (2023 Las Piñas)
Medals
Men's basketball
Head coach for New Zealand
FIBA Oceania Championship
Gold medal – first place	2001 New Zealand	Team
Silver medal – second place	2003 Australia	Team
Silver medal – second place	2005 New Zealand	Team
Commonwealth Games
Silver medal – second place	2006 Melbourne	Team
Head coach for Lebanon
FIBA Asia Stanković Cup
Gold medal – first place	2010 Beirut	Team
ABC
Silver medal – second place	2010 Beirut	Team
William Jones Cup
Silver medal – second place	2010 Taipei	Team
Head coach for Jordan
FIBA Asia Championship
Silver medal – second place	2011 Wuhan	Team
Head coach for Philippines
FIBA Asia Championship
Silver medal – second place	2015 Changsha	Team
SEABA Championship
Gold medal – first place	2015 Singapore	Team
SEA Games
Gold medal – first place	2015 Singapore	Team
William Jones Cup
Silver medal – second place	2015 Taipei	Team

Thomas Anthony "Tab" Baldwin ONZM (born 16 May 1958) is an American-New Zealand basketball coach who most recently served as the head of the Ateneo Blue Eagles of the University Athletic Association of the Philippines (UAAP). Baldwin also served as a consultant of Philippine Basketball Association club team TNT Tropang Giga. In June 2026, Baldwin was placed under investigation by the Philippine government for training methods that involved swimming near tidal waves that left two athletes dead from drowning. The UAAP imposed a unappealable lifetime ban against Baldwin barring him from coaching in the league and appearing in games.

== Coaching career ==
=== New Zealand ===
Baldwin was born in Jacksonville, Florida and played for the Bishop Kenny High School under the coaching of his father, who played basketball for Notre Dame in the 1930s. From Jacksonville Beach, he went to New Zealand in 1988 to coach the Otago Nuggets.

He was promoted with them from the second division to the NBL and then joined the Auckland Stars in 1994. In eight seasons with Auckland, he won five NBL titles (1995, 1996, 1997, 1999 and 2000), and was named NBL Coach of the Year four times (1995, 97, 99 and 2014).

He remains the most victorious coach in the history of the New Zealand NBL. Baldwin's involvement continued with the Stars as a co-owner for another eight years after he left as coach.

In 2001, he took the reins of the New Zealand national team. By winning the 2001 FIBA Oceania championship, the Tall Blacks — as New Zealand are known — qualified for the 2002 FIBA World Championship, and even reached the semi-finals; this is the best performance by an Oceania team in the history of the World Championships. Baldwin was appointed an Honorary Officer of the New Zealand Order of Merit in the 2003 New Year Honours, for services to basketball. For his achievements as coach of the New Zealand team, Baldwin was awarded the coach of the year at the Halberg awards — New Zealand's premier sports awards — for both 2001 and 2002.

In 2023, Baldwin would be named into the New Zealand Basketball Hall of Fame.

=== Turkey, Lebanon and Jordan ===
Baldwin has coached Banvitspor in Turkey, PAOK Thessaloniki B.C. in Greece and U Mobitelco Cluj in Romania.

On 16 April 2010, he was appointed as Lebanon national basketball team head coach., and on 15 August 2010, Lebanon won the FIBA Asia Stanković Cup 2010 with Baldwin as head coach.

In June 2011, Baldwin was hired to coach the Jordanian national basketball team.

=== Philippines, Ateneo Blue Eagles ===
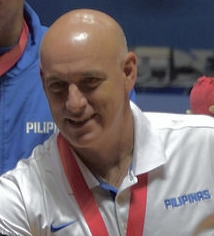
Baldwin as the Philippine national team coach in 2015

On 2014, Baldwin was appointed as Talk 'N Text Tropang Texters assistant coach and consultant. He was let go by the team in 2020.

On 23 December 2014, the Samahang Basketbol ng Pilipinas formally announced the appointment of Baldwin as head coach of the Philippine men's national team (popularly known as Gilas Pilipinas), replacing Chot Reyes. Baldwin's two-year tenure as coach officially began on 1 January 2015.

On 7 December 2015, Ateneo de Manila University formally announced the hiring of Baldwin as the head coach of its collegiate men's varsity basketball team. He will be coaching the Blue Eagles in between the 2016 Olympics men's basketball qualifying tournament and the qualifying rounds for the 2019 FIBA Basketball World Cup, concentrating on the national team during the UAAP offseason. A few days later, the Ateneo management reconsidered its decision to place Baldwin as the team's head coach following an objection by the Basketball Coaches of the Philippines, and instead was to be appointed as the collegiate team's consultant. In 2016, Baldwin was officially named as the head coach and no longer just as a team consultant.

On 18 October 2016, SBP executive director Sonny Barrios declared that Chot Reyes will return as head coach of Gilas while Baldwin will stay with the national team as the team's consultant, the same coaching setup the national team had during its historic 2013 FIBA Asia Championship and 2014 FIBA World Cup runs.

On 3 December 2017, Baldwin led the Ateneo Blue Eagles to their ninth UAAP basketball championship against the De La Salle Green Archers.

In 2019, he coached the Blue Eagles to a 14–0 sweep of the elimination round of UAAP Season 82 basketball tournaments, with an average winning margin of 17.4 points per game. On 20 November, Ateneo completed the season sweep and won their third consecutive title with Baldwin by defeating the UST Growling Tigers, 86–79. In May of the same year, Baldwin was also appointed as programme director for the Philippine youth national team. Under Baldwin, the Blue Eagles have won four championships in the UAAP. In May 2023, he was recognised by the Collegiate Press Corps as the UAAP Men's Basketball Coach of the Year for the 2019–20 and 2022–23 seasons.

In June 2021, Baldwin returned to take over as head coach of the Philippines, leading the Philippines to three wins out of three games in the final window of the 2021 FIBA Asia Cup qualification, completing a sweep for Gilas. However, weeks before the first window of the 2023 FIBA Basketball World Cup qualification, Baldwin stepped down from his post as Gilas coach, choosing to focus on Ateneo's campaign for the UAAP Season 84. He was replaced by Chot Reyes.

==== 2026 Ateneo drowning incident ====
On 8 June 2026, Rene Clert Baterbonia and Divine Adili, two student-athletes of the Ateneo Blue Eagles men's basketball team, died in a drowning incident during a training activity in Dipaculao, Aurora. Following the tragedy, the team's off-campus training practices under Baldwin faced public scrutiny. He was later summoned by the Department of Labor and Employment on 11 June to explain his alien employment permit and was issued a show-cause order requiring him to appear before the agency on 15 June 2026. Instead of appearing, Baldwin and team manager Christopher "Epok" Quimpo alongside the other implicated coaching staff resigned from the school team. The UAAP imposed a unappealable lifetime ban against Baldwin barring him from coaching in the league and appearing in games.

=== Summary ===
- League Coaching Career:
  - Auburn Montgomery – NCAA Division II, 1983–1986
  - UCF – NCAA Division I, 1986–1988
  - Otago Nuggets – NBL, 1988–1990
  - Auckland Stars – NBL, 1994–2001
  - Perak Red Eagles – MNBL, 1996–1997
  - Banvitspor – TBL, 2004–2006
  - PAOK Thessaloniki B.C. – A1, 2007–2008
  - U-Mobitelco Cluj – Divizia A, 2007–2009
  - Kepez Belediyesi S.K. – TBL, 2009
  - Sagesse Beirut – Lebanese Basketball League, 2010–2012
  - Fujian Xunxing (China, 2012–2013)
  - Hawke's Bay Hawks (New Zealand, 2013)
- International Coaching Career:
  - Head coach of New Zealand national basketball team (2001–2006)
  - Head coach of Malaysia national basketball team (1996)
  - Head coach of Lebanon national basketball team (2010–2011)
  - Head coach of Jordanian national basketball team (2011–2012)
  - Head coach of Philippines men's national basketball team (2015–2016, 2021)
- Other Basketball Ventures:
  - Team Consultant of Philippines men's national basketball team (2013–2014, 2016–present)
  - Team Consultant of Talk 'N Text Tropang Texters – PBA (2014–2016, 2018–2020)
  - Team Consultant of Ateneo de Manila University Blue Eagles – UAAP (2016)
  - Head coach of Ateneo de Manila University Blue Eagles – UAAP (2016–2026)
  - Head of the Gilas Pilipinas Youth national basketball program

== Personal life ==
Baldwin was previously married to Efthymia, originally from Greece. Baldwin married Efthymia in 2011, but has been separated from her since 2020.

== Coaching record ==
=== Domestic Leagues ===
Team	Year	G	W	L	W–L%	Result
Otago Nuggets	1990	22	4	18	.181	
Auckland Stars	1994	24	15	9	.625	
Auckland Stars	1995	30	27	3	.9000	Won 1995 NBL-New Zealand Finals
Auckland Stars	1996	28	23	5	.821	Won 1996 NBL-New Zealand Finals
Auckland Stars	1997	24	23	1	.958	Won 1997 NBL-New Zealand Finals
Auckland Stars	1998	22	16	6	.727	
Auckland Stars	1999	18	14	4	.777	Won 1999 NBL-New Zealand Finals
Auckland Stars	2000	18	12	6	.667	Won 2000 NBL-New Zealand Finals
Auckland Stars	2001	17	9	8	.529	Lost 2001 NBL-New Zealand Semifinals
P.A.O.K. BC	2008	5	1	4	.250	Fired after 5 games
Fujian Sturgeons	2013	32	11	21	.343	
Career		240	155	85	.645	

=== Collegiate record ===
Season	Eliminations				Playoffs				
Season	W	L	PCT	Finish	PG	W	L	PCT	Results
Ateneo de Manila Blue Eagles (UAAP)
2016	10	4	.714	2nd	4	1	3	.250	Runner-Up
2017	13	1	.929	1st	5	3	2	.600	Champion
2018	12	2	.857	1st	3	3	0	1.000	Champion
2019	14	0	1.000	1st	2	2	0	1.000	Champion
2021	13	1	.929	1st	4	2	2	.500	Runner-Up
2022	11	3	.786	1st	4	3	1	.750	Champion
2023	7	7	.500	4th	1	1	0	1.000	Final Four
2024	4	10	.286	8th	—	—	—	—	Eliminated
Totals	84	28	.750		24	15	9	.625	4 championships

Awards
Preceded by Don Tricker	New Zealand's Coach of the Year; 2001–2002	Succeeded by Ruth Aitken
Preceded by Chot Reyes; Jong Uichico	Philippines men's national basketball team head coach 2015–2016; 2020	Succeeded by Chot Reyes; Chot Reyes
Preceded by Bo Perasol	Ateneo Blue Eagles head coach 2015–2025	Succeeded by Louie Alas
