= UAAP Season 50 men's basketball tournament =

Basketball competition in the Philippines

1987 UAAP season
- Host school: Ateneo de Manila University
Men's Finals	G1	Wins
Ateneo Blue Eagles	94	1+1
UE Red Warriors	92	0
- Duration: October 4, 1987
- Arena(s): Rizal Memorial Coliseum
- Winning coach: Cris Calilan
- TV network(s): PTV

The 1987 UAAP men's basketball tournament was the 50th year of the men's tournament of the University Athletic Association of the Philippines (UAAP)'s basketball championship. Hosted by Ateneo de Manila University, the Ateneo Blue Eagles defeated the UE Red Warriors in the finals taking their first UAAP men's basketball championship after transferring from the NCAA (Philippines) in 1978.

== Tournament format ==
- Double round robin; the two teams with the best records advance Finals:
  - The #1 seed will only need to win once to clinch the championship.
  - The #2 seed has to win twice to clinch the championship.

== Elimination round ==
Pos	Team	W	L	Pts	Qualification
1	Ateneo Blue Eagles (H)	13	1	27	Twice-to-beat in the finals
2	UE Red Warriors	10	4	24	Twice-to-win in the finals
3	UP Parrots	9	5	23	
4	FEU Tamaraws	8	6	22	
5	De La Salle Green Archers	6	8	20	
6	Adamson Soaring Falcons	5	9	19	
7	UST Glowing Goldies (Note: UST had to forfeit four wins due to an ineligible player.)	3	11	17	
8	NU Bulldogs	2	12	16	

Rules for classification: 1) match points; 2) if tied for #2, one-game playoff; 3) head-to-head record; 4) head-to-head point differential; 5) overall point differential
(H) Hosts
Notes:

Fedencio Oblina of the University of Santo Tomas (UST) was found to be ineligible as he failed his NCEE examinations. The board then forfeited all of UST's win where Oblina played, with the Goldies going from a 6–3 record (tied for third) to a 2–7 record, at seventh place ahead of winless National University (NU). The forfeitures benefited Adamson, Ateneo and Far Eastern University (FEU): Ateneo found themselves at the top of the standings with an 8–1 record. A source of the Manila Standard newspaper confirmed that while Oblina failed the NCEE twice, he passed it on 1985.

NU won their first game in six years with an 89–75 win over the University of the Philippines (UP) squad that was shorthanded by injuries. Their win snapped their nine-game losing streak during the season. Meanwhile, the UAAP Board confirmed that Oblina has been meted with a lifetime ban.

== Finals ==
Number 1 seed Ateneo only has to win once, while number 2 seed UE has to win twice, to clinch the championship.

October 4

Ateneo Blue Eagles	94–92	UE Red Warriors
Ateneo wins series after one game

Rizal Memorial Coliseum, Manila

With Ateneo center Danny Francisco sitting out the game due to a lung ailment, University of the East (UE) started the game strong, taking a 51–38 lead at halftime. After the Warriors extended their lead to twenty points at 83–63, Ateneo came alive and had a 22–2 run sparked by a three-point shot by Joseph Kenneth Nieto to tie the game at 85–all. Nieto and Gilbert Reyes scored for Ateneo to give them the 92–86 lead. UE tied the score anew at 92–all after free-throws from Bernie Villarias, Conrado Barilo and Modesto Hojilla, but on the succeeding possession, a driving Emilio Chuatico was blocked by Hojilla who was called for an intentional foul. After Chuatico split his free-throws and Ateneo retaining possession, the Blue Eagles dribbled the time until a driving Eric Reyes was fouled by Jerry Codiñera with three seconds left. Reyes ended the game by splitting his free-throws, and giving Ateneo their first UAAP championship.

== See also ==
- NCAA Season 63 basketball tournaments

Preceded by Season 49 (1986)	UAAP basketball seasons Season 50 (1987) basketball	Succeeded by Season 51 (1988)
