= UAAP Season 79 basketball tournaments =

Basketball season

UAAP Season 79
- Host school: University of Santo Tomas
Men's Finals	G1	G2	Wins
De La Salle Green Archers	67	79	2
Ateneo Blue Eagles	65	72	0
- Duration: December 3–7, 2016
- Arena(s): Mall of Asia Arena; Smart Araneta Coliseum
- Finals MVP: Jeron Teng
- Winning coach: Aldin Ayo (1st title)
- Semifinalists: FEU Tamaraws; Adamson Soaring Falcons
- TV network(s): ABS-CBN, ABS-CBN HD, ABS-CBN Sports and Action, The Filipino Channel, ABS-CBN Sports and Action HD
Women's Finals	G1	G2	Wins
NU Lady Bulldogs	77	96	2
De La Salle Lady Archers	74	72	0
- Duration: December 3–7, 2016
- Arena(s): Mall of Asia Arena; Smart Araneta Coliseum
- Finals MVP: Gemma Miranda
- Winning coach: Patrick Aquino (3rd title)
- Semifinalists: UE Lady Warriors; Adamson Lady Falcons
Juniors' Finals	G1	G2	Wins
NUNS Bullpups	65	73	0
FEU–D Baby Tamaraws	66	81	2
- Duration: February 21–24, 2017
- Arena(s): Filoil Flying V Arena
- Finals MVP: Louell Gonzales
- Winning coach: Allan Albano (2nd title)
- Semifinalists: Ateneo Blue Eaglets; Zobel Junior Archers
- TV network(s): ABS-CBN Sports and Action HD

The UAAP Season 79 basketball tournaments are held in school year 2016–17. University of Santo Tomas is the season host while Far Eastern University are the defending champions. ABS-CBN's UHF channel ABS-CBN Sports and Action broadcast the men's tournament for the seventeenth consecutive year.

== Men's tournament ==
=== Teams ===
Team	University	Seniors' coach
Adamson Soaring Falcons	Adamson University (AdU)	(Philippines) Franz Pumaren
Ateneo Blue Eagles	Ateneo de Manila University (ADMU)	(United States) Tab Baldwin
De La Salle Green Archers	De La Salle University (DLSU)	(Philippines) Aldin Ayo
FEU Tamaraws	Far Eastern University (FEU)	(Philippines) Nash Racela
NU Bulldogs	National University (NU)	(Philippines) Eric Altamirano
UE Red Warriors	University of the East (UE)	(Philippines) Derrick Pumaren
UP Fighting Maroons	University of the Philippines Diliman (UP)	(Philippines) Bo Perasol
UST Growling Tigers	University of Santo Tomas (UST)	(Philippines) Boy Sablan

==== Coaching changes ====
Team	Old coach	Reason	New coach
Ateneo	(Philippines) Bo Perasol	Resigned	(United States) Tab Baldwin
La Salle	(Philippines) Juno Sauler	Resigned	(Philippines) Aldin Ayo
Adamson	(Philippines) Mike Fermin	End of interim spell	(Philippines) Franz Pumaren
UP	(Philippines) Renzy Bajar	Fired	(Philippines) Bo Perasol
UST	(Philippines) Bong dela Cruz	Fired	(Philippines) Boy Sablan

=== Elimination round ===
==== Team standings ====
Pos	Team	W	L	PCT	GB	Qualification
1	De La Salle Green Archers	13	1	.929	—	Twice-to-beat in the semifinals
2	Ateneo Blue Eagles	10	4	.714	3	Twice-to-beat in the semifinals
3	FEU Tamaraws	9	5	.643	4	Twice-to-win in the semifinals
4	Adamson Soaring Falcons	8	6	.571	5	Twice-to-win in the semifinals
5	NU Bulldogs	5	9	.357 (Note: Head-to-head record: NU 1–1 UP (NU +6))	8	
6	UP Fighting Maroons	5	9	.357	8	
7	UE Red Warriors	3	11	.214 (Note: Head-to-head record: UE 1–1 UST (UE +9))	10	
8	UST Growling Tigers (H)	3	11	.214	10	

Source: ABS-CBN Sports
Rules for classification: 1) winning percentage; 2) if tied for #2 or #4, one-game playoff; 3) head-to-head record; 4) head-to-head point differential; 5) overall point differential
(H) Hosts

==== Match-up results ====
	Round 1							Round 2						
Team ╲ Game	1	2	3	4	5	6	7	8	9	10	11	12	13	14
Adamson	UP school colors	FEU school colors	Ateneo school colors	NU school colors	La Salle school colors	UE school colors	UST school colors	La Salle school colors	UP school colors	UE school colors	FEU school colors	UST school colors	NU school colors	Ateneo school colors
Ateneo	UST school colors	NU school colors	FEU school colors	Adamson school colors	UE school colors	UP school colors	La Salle school colors	UP school colors	UE school colors	NU school colors	La Salle school colors	FEU school colors	UST school colors	Adamson school colors
La Salle	FEU school colors	UP school colors	UST school colors	NU school colors	Adamson school colors	UE school colors	Ateneo school colors	Adamson school colors	UP school colors	NU school colors	UST school colors	UE school colors	Ateneo school colors	FEU school colors
FEU	La Salle school colors	Adamson school colors	Ateneo school colors	UE school colors	UP school colors	UST school colors	NU school colors	NU school colors	UST school colors	UP school colors	Adamson school colors	Ateneo school colors	La Salle school colors	UE school colors
NU	UE school colors	Ateneo school colors	La Salle school colors	Adamson school colors	UST school colors	UP school colors	FEU school colors	FEU school colors	UST school colors	La Salle school colors	Ateneo school colors	UP school colors	UE school colors	Adamson school colors
UE	NU school colors	UST school colors	FEU school colors	UP school colors	Ateneo school colors	La Salle school colors	Adamson school colors	UST school colors	Ateneo school colors	Adamson school colors	La Salle school colors	NU school colors	UP school colors	FEU school colors
UP	Adamson school colors	La Salle school colors	UST school colors	UE school colors	FEU school colors	Ateneo school colors	NU school colors	Ateneo school colors	Adamson school colors	La Salle school colors	FEU school colors	NU school colors	UST school colors	UE school colors
UST	Ateneo school colors	UE school colors	La Salle school colors	UP school colors	NU school colors	FEU school colors	Adamson school colors	UE school colors	FEU school colors	NU school colors	La Salle school colors	UP school colors	Adamson school colors	Ateneo school colors

= Win; = OT win; = Loss; = OT loss

==== Scores ====
Team	AdU	ADMU	DLSU	FEU	NU	UE	UP	UST
Adamson Soaring Falcons		62–61	75–91	65–75	64–51	57–64	104–85	79–52
Ateneo Blue Eagles	73–67		81–97	76–71	60–70	84–69	79–64	73–69
De La Salle Green Archers	86–79	71–83		83–78	75–66	84–78	89–71	100–62
FEU Tamaraws	59–61	59–74	67–73		78–75	67–59	51–49	79–72
NU Bulldogs	53–77	50–65	88–113	56–57		72–66	80–69	75–68
UE Red Warriors	71–79	61–75	66–95	61–64	52–64		71–75	87–88
UP Fighting Maroons	70–66	56–52	72–78	60–63	71–66	67–80		77–83
UST Growling Tigers	61–76	64–74	56–99	48–59	73–69	61–71	69–75	

Legend: Blue = left column team win; Red = top row team win.

=== Bracket ===
Semifinals (Top 2 twice-to-beat)
1	La Salle	69
4	Adamson	64
2	Ateneo	61	69*
3	FEU	62	68

Finals (Best-of-three playoff)
1	La Salle	67	79
2	Ateneo	65	72

*Overtime

=== Semifinals ===
In the semifinals, the higher seed has the twice-to-beat advantage, where they only have to win once, while their opponents twice, to progress.

==== (1) La Salle vs. (4) Adamson ====
The De La Salle Green Archers has the twice-to-beat advantage.

ABS-CBN Sports and Action

November 23
4:00 p.m.

De La Salle Green Archers	69–64	Adamson Soaring Falcons
Scoring by quarter: 22–20, 15–13, 13–18, 19–13
Pts: Jeron Teng 25; Rebs: Ben Mbala 16; Asts: 3 players, 1 each		Pts: Sean Manganti 13; Rebs: Papi Sarr 7 Asts: Sean Manganti 3
La Salle wins series in one game

Mall of Asia Arena, Pasay

==== (2) Ateneo vs. (3) FEU ====
The Ateneo Blue Eagles has the twice-to-beat advantage.

ABS-CBN Sports and Action

November 26
4:00 p.m.

Ateneo Blue Eagles	61–62	FEU Tamaraws
Scoring by quarter: 10–10, 10–13, 22–12, 19–27
Pts: Aaron Black 11; Rebs: Mike Nieto 8 Asts: Ravena, Verano, 4 each		Pts: Raymar Jose 20; Rebs: Raymar Jose 23; Asts: Axel Inigo 3

Mall of Asia Arena, Pasay

ABS-CBN Sports and Action

November 30
4:00 p.m.

Ateneo Blue Eagles	69–68 (OT)	FEU Tamaraws
Scoring by quarter: 15–20, 23–21, 15–8, 13–17, Overtime: 3–2
Pts: Ravena, Mi. Nieto, 13 each Rebs: Isaac Go 14; Asts: Adrian Wóng 4		Pts: Monbert Arong 15; Rebs: Jose, Orizu, 12 each Asts: Wendel Comboy 6
Ateneo wins series in two games

Smart Araneta Coliseum, Quezon City

=== Finals ===
This is the fifth overall Finals matchup between the De La Salle Green Archers and the Ateneo Blue Eagles. The Blue Eagles won their last encounter in 2008.

ABS-CBN

December 3
3:30 p.m.

De La Salle Green Archers	67–65	Ateneo Blue Eagles
Scoring by quarter: 19–6, 17–20, 16–26, 15–13
Pts: Ben Mbala 20; Rebs: Ben Mbala 15; Asts: Andrei Caracut 4		Pts: Aaron Black 12; Rebs: Chibueze Ikeh 9 Asts: Black, Ravena, 3 each

Mall of Asia Arena, Pasay
Attendance: 16, 712

ABS-CBN Sports and Action

December 7
3:30 p.m.

De La Salle Green Archers	79–72	Ateneo Blue Eagles
Scoring by quarter: 22–16, 23–19, 14–17, 20–20
Pts: Jeron Teng 28; Rebs: Ben Mbala 10; Asts: Thomas Torres 3		Pts: Mike Nieto 18; Rebs: Verano, Go, 9 each Asts: Adrian Wóng 4
La Salle wins series 2–0

Smart Araneta Coliseum, Quezon City
Attendance: 17, 495

- Finals Most Valuable Player: Jeron Teng (De La Salle Green Archers)

==== Broadcast notes ====
All games will be aired on S+A Channel 23, S+A HD Channel 166, TFC.tv and sports.abs-cbn.com. Game 1 was also simulcast on ABS-CBN Channel 2 and ABS-CBN HD Channel 167.

Game	Play-by-play	Analyst	Courtside reporters
Game 1 and Game 2	Eric Tipan	Christian Luanzon	Bea Escudero and Denice Dinsay

=== Awards ===
UAAP Season 79 men's basketball champions
De La Salle Green Archers
Ninth title

- Most Valuable Player: Ben Mbala (De La Salle Green Archers)
- Rookie of the Year: Aljun Jay Melecio (De La Salle Green Archers)
- Mythical Team:
  - Ben Mbala (De La Salle Green Archers)
  - Jeron Teng (De La Salle Green Archers)
  - Paul Desiderio (UP Fighting Maroons)
  - Raymar Jose (FEU Tamaraws)
  - Thirdy Ravena (Ateneo Blue Eagles)

==== Sponsored awards ====
- Chooks-to-go Sportsmanship Award: Isaac Go (Ateneo Blue Eagles)
- Appeton Most Improved Player: Isaac Go (Ateneo Blue Eagles)
- PS Bank PSBankable Player: Ben Mbala (De La Salle Green Archers)
- Manulife Up and Coming Player of the Season: Aljun Jay Melecio (De La Salle Green Archers)
- Kopiko 78's Recharged Player:
  - Bon Batiller (UE Red Warriors)
  - Louie Vigil (UST Growling Tigers)
  - Dave Moralde (UP Fighting Maroons)
  - Jjay Alejandro (NU Bulldogs)
  - Jerrick Ahanmisi (Adamson Soaring Falcons)
  - Prince Orizu (FEU Tamaraws)
  - Anton Asistio (Ateneo Blue Eagles)
  - Ben Mbala (De La Salle Green Archers)

==== Players of the Week ====
Week	Player	Ref.
September 7–11	Ben Mbala (La Salle)	
September 14–18	Jeron Teng (La Salle)	
September 21–25	Kib Montalbo (La Salle)	
September 28 – October 2	Ben Mbala (La Salle)	
October 5–9	Monbert Arong (FEU)	
October 12–16	Marvin Lee (UST)	
October 19–23	Raymar Jose (FEU)	
October 26–30	Jett Manuel (UP)	
November 2–6	Aaron Black (Ateneo)	
November 9–13	Isaac Go (Ateneo)	

== Women's tournament ==
=== Elimination round ===
==== Team standings ====
Pos	Team	W	L	PCT	GB	Qualification
1	NU Lady Bulldogs	14	0	1.000	—	Advance to the Finals (Note: As NU won all of their elimination round games, the stepladder format will be used instead of the regular Final Four format.)
2	De La Salle Lady Archers	11	3	.786	3	Twice-to-beat in stepladder round 2
3	UE Lady Warriors	10	4	.714	4	Proceed to stepladder round 1
4	Adamson Lady Falcons	6	8	.429 (Note: Fourth-seed playoff: Adamson 73–58 UST)	8	Proceed to stepladder round 1
5	UST Growling Tigresses (H)	6	8	.429	8	
6	Ateneo Lady Eagles	4	10	.286	10	
7	FEU Lady Tamaraws	3	11	.214	11	
8	UP Fighting Maroons	2	12	.143	12	

Source: ABS-CBN Sports
Rules for classification: 1) winning percentage; 2) if tied for #2 or #4, one-game playoff; 3) head-to-head record; 4) head-to-head point differential; 5) overall point differential
(H) Hosts

==== Match-up results ====
	Round 1							Round 2						
Team ╲ Game	1	2	3	4	5	6	7	8	9	10	11	12	13	14
AdU	UP school colors	FEU school colors	NU school colors	Ateneo school colors	La Salle school colors	UE school colors	UST school colors	La Salle school colors	UP school colors	NU school colors	Ateneo school colors	UST school colors	UE school colors	FEU school colors
AdMU	UST school colors	NU school colors	Adamson school colors	FEU school colors	UE school colors	UP school colors	La Salle school colors	FEU school colors	NU school colors	UP school colors	Adamson school colors	UE school colors	UST school colors	La Salle school colors
DLSU	FEU school colors	UP school colors	NU school colors	UST school colors	Adamson school colors	UE school colors	Ateneo school colors	Adamson school colors	UST school colors	FEU school colors	NU school colors	UE school colors	UP school colors	Ateneo school colors
FEU	La Salle school colors	Adamson school colors	UE school colors	Ateneo school colors	UST school colors	NU school colors	UP school colors	Ateneo school colors	UE school colors	La Salle school colors	UST school colors	NU school colors	UP school colors	Adamson school colors
NU	UE school colors	Ateneo school colors	Adamson school colors	La Salle school colors	UP school colors	FEU school colors	UST school colors	UE school colors	Ateneo school colors	Adamson school colors	UST school colors	La Salle school colors	FEU school colors	UP school colors
UE	NU school colors	UST school colors	UP school colors	FEU school colors	Ateneo school colors	La Salle school colors	Adamson school colors	NU school colors	FEU school colors	UP school colors	Ateneo school colors	La Salle school colors	Adamson school colors	UST school colors
UP	Adamson school colors	La Salle school colors	UE school colors	UST school colors	Ateneo school colors	NU school colors	FEU school colors	UST school colors	Adamson school colors	Ateneo school colors	UE school colors	FEU school colors	La Salle school colors	NU school colors
UST	Ateneo school colors	UE school colors	UP school colors	La Salle school colors	FEU school colors	Adamson school colors	NU school colors	UP school colors	La Salle school colors	NU school colors	FEU school colors	Ateneo school colors	Adamson school colors	UE school colors

= Win; = OT win; = Loss; = OT loss

==== Scores ====
Team	AdU	ADMU	DLSU	FEU	NU	UE	UP	UST
Adamson		74–62	61–69	56–61	53–85	57–69	66–61	66–62
Ateneo	64–65*		57–67	60–56	52–74	50–60	40–42	65–57
La Salle	76–74	71–60		76–52	59–72	74–72	65–46	77–67
FEU	53–57	39–54	66–62		69–80	45–55	56–52	61–65
NU	79–61	80–56	93–77	78–42		62–58	74–30	103–49
UE	66–55	50–30	64–70	49–44	53–92		69–51	74–57
UP	60–67	44–47	48–65	46–44	55–84	39–53		73–80
UST	74–70	59–42	69–72	62–58	49–71	58–64	70–62	

Legend: Blue = left column team win; Red = top row team win.
Matches with lighter background shading were decided after overtime.

=== Fourth seed playoff ===
November 23
12:00 n.n.

Adamson Lady Falcons	73–58	UST Growling Tigresses
Scoring by quarter: 23–8, 14–14, 19–15, 17–21
Pts: Kaye Pingol 17; Rebs: Nathalia Prado 10; Asts: 3 players, 3		Pts: Shanda Aries 14; Rebs: Misaela Larosa 16; Asts: Aries, Gandalla 3
Adamson enters the Final Four

Mall of Asia Arena, Pasay

=== Bracket ===
Stepladder round 1 (Single-elimination)
3	UE	48
4	Adamson	45

Stepladder round 2 (No. 2 twice-to-beat)
2	La Salle	72
3	UE	50

Finals (Best-of-three playoff)
1	NU	77	96
2	La Salle	74	72

=== Stepladder semifinals ===
==== (3) UE vs. (4) Adamson ====
This is a one-game playoff.

November 26
12:00 n.n.

UE Lady Warriors	48–45	Adamson Lady Falcons
Scoring by quarter: 11–7, 14–6, 10–18, 13–14
Pts: Tacula, Chan, 11; Rebs: Chan, Gayacao, 11; Asts: Eunique Chan 3		Pts: Lacson, Alcoy, 10; Rebs: Nathalia Prado 17; Asts: Camacho, Araja, 4
UE advances to the semifinals

Mall of Asia Arena, Pasay

==== (2) La Salle vs. (3) UE ====
In the semifinals, La Salle has the twice-to-beat advantage, where they only have to win once, while their opponents twice, to progress.

November 30
12:00 n.n.

De La Salle Lady Archers	72–50	UE Lady Warriors
Scoring by quarter: 15–16, 15–2, 22–13, 20–19
Pts: Khate Castillo 23; Rebs: Snow Peñaranda 13; Asts: Camille Claro 8		Pts: Love Joy Sto. Domingo 22; Rebs: Alysaa Gayacao 12; Asts: Nicole Medina 5
La Salle wins series in one game

Smart Araneta Coliseum, Quezon City

=== Finals ===
This is a best-of-three playoff.

December 3
12:00 n.n.

NU Lady Bulldogs	77–74	De La Salle Lady Archers
Scoring by quarter: 20–19, 8–20, 28–10, 21–25
Pts: Gemma Miranda 23; Rebs: Gemma Miranda 15; Asts: Bernardino, Miranda, 5 each		Pts: Khate Castillo 18; Rebs: Snow Peñaranda 11; Asts: Camille Claro 9

Mall of Asia Arena, Pasay

December 7
12:00 n.n.

NU Lady Bulldogs	96–72	De La Salle Lady Archers
Scoring by quarter: 26–15, 26–23, 26–9, 18–25
Pts: Gemma Miranda 25; Rebs: Jack Animam 18; Asts: Afril Bernardino 9		Pts: Khate Castillo 15; Rebs: Snow Peñaranda 11; Asts: Camille Claro 6
NU wins series 2–0

Smart Araneta Coliseum, Quezon City

=== Awards ===
UAAP Season 79 women's basketball champions
NU Lady Bulldogs
Third title, third consecutive title

- Most Valuable Player: Afril Bernardino (NU Lady Bulldogs)
- Mythical Five:
  - Jack Danielle Animam (NU Lady Bulldogs)
  - Gemma Miranda (NU Lady Bulldogs)
  - Afril Bernardino (NU Lady Bulldogs)
  - Mary Snow April Peñaranda (De La Salle Lady Archers)
  - Love Sto. Domingo (UE Lady Warriors)

== Juniors' tournament ==
=== Elimination round ===
==== Team standings ====
Pos	Team	W	L	PCT	GB	Qualification
1	NUNS Bullpups	12	2	.857	—	Twice-to-beat in the semifinals
2	FEU–D Baby Tamaraws (H)	11	3	.786 (Note: Second-seed playoff: FEU Diliman 64–62 Ateneo)	1	Twice-to-beat in the semifinals
3	Ateneo Blue Eaglets	11	3	.786	1	Twice-to-win in the semifinals
4	Zobel Junior Archers	6	8	.429 (Note: Fourth-seed playoff: DLSZ 72–65 UST)	6	Twice-to-win in the semifinals
5	UST Tiger Cubs	6	8	.429	6	
6	UPIS Junior Fighting Maroons	5	9	.357	7	
7	UE Junior Red Warriors	3	11	.214	9	
8	Adamson Baby Falcons (Note: Adamson forfeited 11 wins after Encho Serrano, who participated on those games, was ruled as an ineligible player.)	2	12	.143	10	

Rules for classification: 1) winning percentage; 2) if tied for #2 or #4, one-game playoff; 3) head-to-head record; 4) head-to-head point differential; 5) overall point differential
(H) Hosts

==== Match-up results ====
	Round 1							Round 2						
Team ╲ Game	1	2	3	4	5	6	7	8	9	10	11	12	13	14
AdU	UP school colors	FEU school colors	NU school colors	Ateneo school colors	La Salle school colors	UST school colors	UE school colors	FEU school colors	UP school colors	Ateneo school colors	La Salle school colors	UE school colors	UST school colors	NU school colors
AdMU	UST school colors	NU school colors	FEU school colors	Adamson school colors	UE school colors	UP school colors	La Salle school colors	NU school colors	UST school colors	Adamson school colors	UP school colors	La Salle school colors	UE school colors	FEU school colors
DLSZ	FEU school colors	UP school colors	UST school colors	NU school colors	Adamson school colors	UE school colors	Ateneo school colors	UST school colors	NU school colors	UE school colors	Adamson school colors	Ateneo school colors	FEU school colors	UP school colors
FEU	La Salle school colors	Adamson school colors	Ateneo school colors	UE school colors	UP school colors	NU school colors	UST school colors	Adamson school colors	UE school colors	NU school colors	UST school colors	UP school colors	La Salle school colors	Ateneo school colors
NSNU	UE school colors	Ateneo school colors	Adamson school colors	La Salle school colors	UST school colors	FEU school colors	UP school colors	Ateneo school colors	La Salle school colors	FEU school colors	UE school colors	UST school colors	UP school colors	Adamson school colors
UE	NU school colors	UST school colors	UP school colors	FEU school colors	Ateneo school colors	La Salle school colors	Adamson school colors	UP school colors	FEU school colors	La Salle school colors	NU school colors	Adamson school colors	Ateneo school colors	UST school colors
UPIS	Adamson school colors	La Salle school colors	UE school colors	UST school colors	FEU school colors	Ateneo school colors	NU school colors	UE school colors	Adamson school colors	UST school colors	Ateneo school colors	FEU school colors	NU school colors	La Salle school colors
UST	Ateneo school colors	UE school colors	La Salle school colors	UP school colors	NU school colors	Adamson school colors	FEU school colors	La Salle school colors	Ateneo school colors	UP school colors	FEU school colors	NU school colors	Adamson school colors	UE school colors

= Win; = OT win; = Win by forfeit; = Loss; = OT loss; = Loss by forfeit

==== Scores ====
Team	AdU	ADMU	DLSZ	FEU	NSNU	UE	UPIS	UST
Adamson		77–65 (Note: Loss by forfeit)	78–53	78–65	80–67	130–47	72–59	86–43
Ateneo	73–79 (Note: Win by forfeit)		64–57	73–77	68–73	89–62	79–55	79–73
La Salle	51–78	53–69		56–66	55–80	86–54	59–81	64–58
FEU	75–73	70–75	70–56		67–78	100–82	84–68	87–76
NSNU	68–70	78–71	63–52	46–61		104–54	95–61	73–64
UE	–	53–92	59–81	51–94	56–107		63–95	87–77
UP	59–77	77–103	69–82	–	64–90	82–74		67–69
UST	58–92	75–81	83–77*	54–52	59–72	94–81	91–83	

Legend: Blue = left column team win; Red = top row team win.
Matches with lighter background shading were decided after overtime.

=== Bracket ===
Semifinals (Top 2 twice-to-beat)
1	NSNU	72
4	DLSZ	50
2	FEU–D	56	74
3	Ateneo	75	72

Finals (Best-of-three playoff)
1	NSNU	65	73
2	FEU–D	66	81

=== Fourth seed playoff ===
February 9
2:00 p.m.

4th seed

Zobel Junior Archers	72–65	UST Tiger Cubs
Scoring by quarter: 20–11, 20–19, 14–14, 18–21
Pts: Roberto Mariano 17; Rebs: Diaz, Romero, 7 Asts: Franz Diaz 6		Pts: CJ Cansino 17; Rebs: Cansino, Fornillos, 12; Asts: CJ Cansino 5
DLSZ advances to the Final Four

Filoil Flying V Arena

=== Second seed playoff ===
February 9
4:00 p.m.

2nd seed

Ateneo Blue Eaglets	62–64	FEU–D Baby Tamaraws
Scoring by quarter: 20–9, 17–18, 12–21, 13–19
Pts: SJ Belangel 23; Rebs: Kai Sotto 17; Asts: SJ Belangel 4		Pts: Jack Gloria 14; Rebs: Jack Gloria 13; Asts: Abarrientos, Gonzales, 4
FEU Diliman wins the twice–to–beat advantage

Filoil Flying V Arena

=== Semifinals ===
==== (1) NSNU vs. (4) DLSZ ====
In the semifinals, NU has the twice-to-beat advantage, where they only have to win once, while their opponents twice, to progress.

February 14
3:30 p.m.

NUNS Bullpups	72–50	Zobel Junior Archers
Scoring by quarter: 17–8, 22–12, 12–22, 21–8
Pts: John Lloyd Clemente 28; Rebs: Rhayyan Amsali 11; Asts: 3 players, 2		Pts: Jan Sobrevega 13; Rebs: Martin Romero 14; Asts: 3 players, 2
NSNU wins series in one game

Filoil Flying V Arena

==== (2) FEU Diliman vs. (3) Ateneo ====
The FEU Baby Tamaraws had the twice-to-beat advantage after beating the Ateneo Blue Eaglets for the second-seed, which led to a virtual best-of-three playoff series.

February 14
1:00 p.m.

FEU–D Baby Tamaraws	56–75	Ateneo Blue Eaglets
Scoring by quarter: 19–21, 14–26, 12–13, 11–15
Pts: Louell Gonzales 13; Rebs: Kenji Roman 8 Asts: Louell Gonzales 4		Pts: Dave Ildefonso 19; Rebs: Kai Sotto 12; Asts: Belangel, Angeles, 3

Filoil Flying V Arena

February 17
3:00 p.m.

FEU–D Baby Tamaraws	74–72	Ateneo Blue Eaglets
Scoring by quarter: 23–22, 13–15, 20–18, 18–17
Pts: Louell Gonzales 22; Rebs: Jack Gloria 11; Asts: Jun Gabane 5		Pts: Sotto, Credo, 16; Rebs: Romulo Berjay 15; Asts: SJ Belangel 4
FEU Diliman wins series in two games

Filoil Flying V Arena

=== Finals ===
ABS-CBN

February 21
3:30 p.m.

NUNS Bullpups	65–66	FEU–D Baby Tamaraws
Scoring by quarter: 20–24, 14–19, 18–14, 13–9
Pts: John Clemente 25; Rebs: Rhayyan Amsali 7 Asts: Paul Manalang 5		Pts: Kenji Roman 12; Rebs: Louell Gonzales 10; Asts: Louell Gonzales 10

Filoil Flying V Arena

ABS-CBN

February 24
3:30 p.m.

NUNS Bullpups	73–81	FEU–D Baby Tamaraws
Scoring by quarter: 26–15, 8–15, 16–21, 23–30
Pts: John Lloyd Clemente 26; Rebs: Karl Penano 9 Asts: Daniel Atienza 5		Pts: Kenji Roman 18; Rebs: Kenji Roman 15; Asts: Louell Gonzales 6
FEU Diliman wins series 2–0

Filoil Flying V Arena

=== Awards ===
UAAP Season 79 juniors' basketball champions
FEU–D Baby Tamaraws
Eighth title

- Most Valuable Player: Juan Gómez de Liaño (UPIS Junior Fighting Maroons)
- Rookie of the Year: Kai Sotto (Ateneo Blue Eaglets)
- Mythical Team:
  - John Lloyd Clemente (NUNS Bullpups)
  - SJ Belangel (Ateneo Blue Eaglets)
  - Juan Gómez de Liaño (UPIS Junior Fighting Maroons)
  - Sean Dave Ildefonso (Ateneo Blue Eaglets)
  - Inand Fornillos (UST Tiger Cubs)

== Overall Championship points ==
=== Seniors' division ===
Team	Men	Women	Total
De La Salle Green Archers	15	12	27
NU Bulldogs	6	15	21
Ateneo Blue Eagles	12	4	16
Adamson Soaring Falcons	8	8	16
FEU Tamaraws	10	2	12
UE Red Warriors	2	10	12
UST Growling Tigers	1	6	7
UP Fighting Maroons	4	1	5

Pts.	Ranking
15	Champion
12	2nd
10	3rd
8	4th
6	5th
4	6th
2	7th
1	8th
—	Did not join
WD	Withdrew

In case of a tie, the team with the higher position in any tournament is ranked higher. If both are still tied, they are listed by alphabetical order.

How rankings are determined:

- Ranks 5th to 8th determined by elimination round standings.
- Loser of the #1 vs #4 semifinal match-up is ranked 4th
- Loser of the #2 vs #3 semifinal match-up is ranked 3rd
- Loser of the finals is ranked 2nd
- Champion is ranked 1st

== See also ==
- NCAA Season 92 basketball tournaments

Preceded by Season 78 (2015)	UAAP basketball seasons Season 79 (2016)	Succeeded by Season 80 (2017)
