= Ange Kouame =

Ivorian-Filipino basketball player (born 1997)

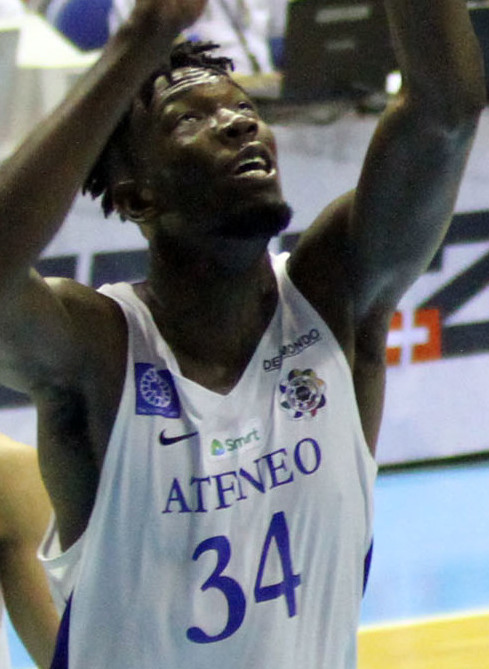
- Kouame with the Ateneo Blue Eagles in 2018

Personal information
- Born: December 15, 1997 (age 28) Abidjan, Côte d'Ivoire
- Listed height: 6 ft 11 in (2.11 m)
- Listed weight: 220 lb (100 kg)

Career information
- College: Ateneo (2018–2022)
- Playing career: 2023–present
- Position: Center

Career history
- 2023–2024: UB Chartres Métropole
- 2024–2025: Meralco Bolts

Career highlights
- 3× UAAP champion (2018, 2019, 2022); UAAP Finals MVP (2022); UAAP Most Valuable Player (2021); UAAP Mythical Team (2021); UAAP Rookie of the Year (2018); 2× PCCL champion (2018, 2019); PCCL Mythical Five (2019); Filoil Flying V Preseason Cup champion (2018); Filoil Flying V Preseason Cup Most Valuable Player (2018); Filoil Flying V Preseason Cup Mythical Five (2018); PBA D-League champion (2019 Aspirants' Cup)
Medals
Men's basketball
Representing Philippines
Asian Games
Gold medal – first place	2022 Hangzhou	Team

Kakou Ange Franck Williams Kouame (born December 15, 1997) is an Ivorian-Filipino basketball player who last played for the Meralco Bolts in the East Asia Super League. Kouame played college basketball for the Ateneo Blue Eagles of the University Athletic Association of the Philippines (UAAP), winning 3 championships with Ateneo and the UAAP MVP award in UAAP Season 84. He also represents the Philippines on its national basketball team. He is listed at 6 ft 11 in. (2.11 m)

== Early life and education ==
Kouame was born on December 15, 1997, in Abidjan, Ivory Coast. He was into football during his early childhood until developing interest in basketball when he and his younger brother requested their father for football kits but were instead given basketball jerseys. When his father died in 2012, he started committing on playing basketball as a means to cope for his loss. Kouame played 3-a-side street basketball with his friends and was part of his high school's basketball team, although he remarked that his stint with his school's team was "not that serious" and involved more "practicing".

Upon the recommendation of a friend, Kouame moved to the Philippines to study at the Ateneo de Manila University under a student-athlete scholarship. Kouame speaks fluent French (the national language of birth country, Ivory Coast) but did not speak English upon moving to the Philippines. He studied for one year at the Multiple Intelligence International School (MIIS) in Quezon City to develop his English speaking skills that would help him be acquainted with Filipino culture prior to attending Ateneo. He would graduate from Ateneo in 2023 with a bachelor's degree in interdisciplinary studies.

== College career ==
Kouame was able to connect with the Ateneo Blue Eagles through his Cameroonian friend Aaron Njike who got recruited for a team in the United States. Njike linked Kouame to Ateneo varsity basketball team manager Epok Quimpo for an opportunity to try out for the college varsity team of Ateneo. He was assessed by coaches Yuri Escueta and Tab Baldwin, who was a team consultant for Ateneo at the time. Ateneo decided to have Kouame join the team despite lacking in fundamentals and training. Koaume only learned how to play traditional 5-a-side basketball in the Philippines and had to learn basketball terminologies in English.

Despite being a foreign player, Kouame did not have to fulfill a residency requirement, due to him graduating from MIIS in Quezon City and debuted for the Ateneo Blue Eagles in UAAP Season 81 in 2018. Prior to his UAAP debut, Kouame was part of Glory Be, Ateneo's B team for a year and also featured for the main collegiate team at the SMART City Hoops Basketball Championship, the SMART Breakdown Basketball Invitationals U25 Division, and the FilOil Preseason Cup in 2018. He also took part in Ateneo's campaign in the 2018 William Jones Cup in Taiwan, which saw his team finishing as fourth placers.

He helped Ateneo clinch two consecutive titles; in UAAP Season 81 and 82. Following Kouame's granting of Filipino citizenship in May 2021 through a naturalization legislation passed by the Congress, the UAAP board made an agreement that Filipinos who received citizenship through an act of Congress shall still be considered as foreign student athletes (FSAs) in the collegiate league.

Kouame stayed two more seasons with Ateneo. In that time he was the Season MVP for Season 84, and despite suffering multiple injuries, was the Finals MVP for Season 85.

He also played for Ateneo in the PBA D-League.

== Professional career ==
By May 2021, Koaume who was still in Ateneo at the time has been receiving offers to play for teams in other parts of Asia and in Europe. However he remained with Ateneo for two more UAAP seasons.

Kouame joined the Rain or Shine Elasto Painters of the Philippine Basketball Association (PBA) in 2023. Despite being a naturalized Filipino citizen already by this time, he is still only eligible to play as an import as per league eligibility rules. Instead, he played for the team at the 2023 William Jones Cup where the team was invited as the Philippines' representative. This marked Kouame's return to the Taiwan tournament since 2018.

In September 2023, UB Chartres Métropole, which plays in the Nationale Masculine 1 (NM1), the third tier of French basketball, announced that they had signed Kouame.

Kouame suits up for PBA team Meralco Bolts in the East Asia Super League for the 2024–25 season. An import under PBA regulations, he is considered as a Filipino under EASL rules filling the naturalized player berth.

In July 2025, Kouame returned to France to join the STB Le Havre. He was to play for the 2025–26 NM1 season which was to begin in September 2025 but was replaced due to failure to comply with medical documentary requirements. In August 2026, Kouame signed with an undisclosed French club.

== National team career ==
=== Naturalization ===
Kouame has been considered for the Philippine national team as early as 2018, following his stint in the 2018 William Jones Cup in Taiwan with Ateneo. However, Kouame would have to obtain Filipino citizenship to be eligible. He successfully obtained consent from his mother to obtain Filipino citizenship, despite his mother hesitating initially over concerns that he might lose his Ivorian citizenship.

The Samahang Basketbol ng Pilipinas (SBP) in 2020 began to lobby in the Congress for Kouame to be given Filipino citizenship through naturalization following his performance in UAAP Season 82 which would make him eligible to play for the Philippine national team. Koaume was added to the national team's pool for the November 2020 window of the 2021 FIBA Asia Cup qualifiers despite a slim chance for his naturalization process to be completed in time for the Philippines' first match in that window. This was meant to help him get acquainted with the Philippine national team's system. The House of Representatives passed a bill granting Kouame citizenship on February 16, 2021, while the Senate passed its version on March 15. The SBP announced on May 18 that President Rodrigo Duterte had signed Kouame's naturalization bill into law.

=== Philippine national team ===
Kouame's eligibility to play for the Philippine national team was confirmed by FIBA in June 2021, a month after he was given Filipino citizenship. He was then included in the Philippines 12-man roster for the third and final round of the 2021 FIBA Asia Cup qualifiers. Kouame debuted for the Philippines in June 16 game against South Korea. The Philippines won 81–78 in that game with Kouame contributing 12 points and 6 rebounds. He also played in the 2020 FIBA Olympic Qualifying Tournament in Belgrade, Serbia.

In 2022, Kouame played against the Jordanian and Saudi Arabian national teams during the 2023 FIBA World Cup qualifiers.

Kouame was included in the 21-man pool for the 2023 FIBA World Cup. However, he was not selected as the Philippines chose Jordan Clarkson as its lone naturalized player.

He would later become part of the 2022 Asian Games squad which won the gold medal.

== Career statistics ==
Legend
GP	Games played	GS	Games started	MPG	Minutes per game
FG%	Field goal percentage	3P%	3-point field goal percentage	FT%	Free throw percentage
RPG	Rebounds per game	APG	Assists per game	SPG	Steals per game
BPG	Blocks per game	PPG	Points per game		Led the league

=== East Asia Super League ===
Year	Team	GP	MPG	FG%	3P%	FT%	RPG	APG	SPG	BPG	PPG
2024–25	(Philippines) Meralco Bolts	6	17.5	.442	.250	.500	6.1	.3	.5	1.1	7.3
Career		6	17.5	.442	.250	.500	6.1	.3	.5	1.1	7.3

=== Domestic leagues ===
Year	Team	League	GP	MPG	FG%	3P%	FT%	RPG	APG	SPG	BPG	PPG
2023–24	(France) UB Chartres Métropole	NM1	29	20.5	.588	.182	.707	6.4	1.0	.6	.6	10.0

== Awards and accomplishments ==
=== UAAP ===
- 3× UAAP champion (2018, 2019, 2022)
- UAAP Finals MVP (2022)
- UAAP Most Valuable Player (2021)
- UAAP Mythical Team (2021)
- UAAP Rookie of the Year (2018)

=== PCCL ===
- 2× PCCL champion (2018, 2019)
- PCCL Mythical Five (2019)

=== Filoil EcoOil Preseason Cup ===
- Filoil Flying V Preseason Cup champion (2018)
- Filoil Flying V Preseason Cup Most Valuable Player (2018)
- Filoil Flying V Preseason Cup Mythical Five (2018)

=== PBA D-League ===
- PBA D-League champion (2019 Aspirants' Cup)
