= KPP =

KPP may refer to:

- Communist Party of Poland
- Communist Party of Transnistria, abbreviated KPP in Russian
- Fisher's equation, also known as the Kolmogorov–Petrovsky–Piskunov equation
- Kai Pearce-Paul, rugby league player
- Kamerun People's Party
- Kentucky Proud Park, a baseball stadium in Lexington, Kentucky, USA (University of Kentucky)
- Kernel Patch Protection, a security feature of Microsoft Windows
- Key Performance Parameters, convey critical performance goals in JCIDS
- Kinetic PreProcessor, an open-source software tool used in atmospheric chemistry
- Korean Patriots Party, a political party in the Republic of Korea (South Korea), right-wing conservatives
- Kyary Pamyu Pamyu, a Japanese female singer
