= Kouassi Kouamé Patrice =

Ivory Coast politician, lawyer (b. 1962)

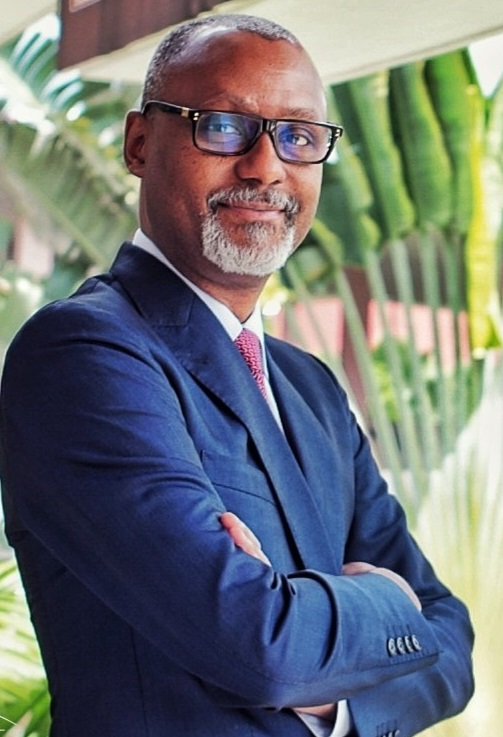

Deputy of National Assembly
- Incumbent
- Assumed office 18 December 2016

Member of the Municipal Council of Yamoussoukro
- Incumbent
- Assumed office 13 October 2018

Personal details
- Born: 2 December 1962 (age 63) Daloa, Ivory Coast
- Party: PDCI-RDA

Kouassi Kouamé Patrice (born December 2, 1962, in Daloa) aka KKP, (baoulé first name), is an Ivorian lawyer and politician.

In December 2016, he became Deputy for Yamoussoukro Commune in the National Assembly of National Assembly of Ivory Coast. He became a member of the Yamoussoukro Municipal Council in October 2018 and deputy mayor in December 2018.

== Early life ==
He earned a Baccalaureate on "Literature and Philosophy" at the Lycée Classique d’Abidjan in 1984. He attended the University of Benin to study law. He earned his Master of Law option on Judicial Careers, then the Certificate of Aptitude to the Profession of Lawyer (CAPA), at the Université Félix Houphouët-Boigny in 1993.

== Career ==
He began his career in 1993 in the office of Maître René Bourgoin as a trainee lawyer, then in 1995 as associate lawyer. Two years later, he became a partner at Bourgoin & Kouassi and at Emeritus Law Firm.

He served as treasurer of the Council of the Bar Association, member of the board of directors of CARPA, Vice-President of the Sports and Cultural Association of the Bar, then representative of the Bar of Ivory Coast at the Central Commission of the Independent Electoral Commission (CEI) from 2005 to 2011.

Patrice is Vice-President of the Foundation la Rentrée du Cœur and member of the association Partage.

During the fiftieth anniversary of the Côte d'Ivoire Bar in Yamoussoukro in 2009, Patrice received the distinction of Chevalier in the National Order of the Ivory Coast.

=== Politics ===
In December 2016, Patrice made his entry into the Ivorian parliament after a victory in the district of Yamoussoukro. He ran as an independent. He became Secretary of the Bureau of the National Assembly and member of the Defense Security Commission.

He later rejoined his original party - the PDCI-RDA- and became a member of the Political Bureau and the Grand Conseil Régional. He serves as Secretary General of the Abla Pokou section of Yamoussoukro.
