= KP =

KP may refer to:

== Arts and media ==
- KP, a recording released by American performer Kyle Patrick
- Kim Possible, American animated television series
- Komsomolskaya Pravda, a daily Russian newspaper
- KP (newspaper), a Ukrainian newspaper

== Businesses and organizations ==
- KP Snacks, a United Kingdom food manufacturer
- Kaiser Permanente, a U.S. health maintenance organization
- Kerala Police, the law enforcement agency for the state of Kerala, India
- Kings Point, the US Merchant Marine Academy
- Communist Party (Serbia), the communist party of Serbia
- Kreni-Promeni, Serbian political party and movement

== People ==
- Katy Perry, American singer
- Kawan Prather, American record executive
- Kevin Pietersen, English cricketer
- Ko Wen-je, Taiwanese politician, physician and professor
- KP Sharma Oli, Nepalese politician and former Prime Minister of Nepal
- Kumaran Pathmanathan, member of the LTTE
- Kristaps Porziņģis, Latvian basketball player
- Kristina Pimenova, Russian-born American model

== Places ==
- Cambodia (WMO country code KP)
- Khyber Pakhtunkhwa, a province in Pakistan
- North Korea (ISO 3166 country code KP)
- Kensington Palace, office and residence of some of the British royal family
- Castletown KP, a common name for Castletown-Kilpatrick, a village in County Meath, Ireland
- Kamptee railway station (station code: KP), Maharashtra, India

== In science, technology, and mathematics ==
=== Biology and medicine ===
- Keratosis pilaris, a human genetic disorder, also known as "chicken skin"
- keratic precipitate, an inflammatory cellular deposit on the cornea of the eye

=== Physics and chemistry ===
- Kadomtsev–Petviashvili equation, describing waves
- Kilogram-force ("kilopond"), a unit measure of force
- K_{P}, the equilibrium constant expressed in terms of partial pressures
- k·p perturbation theory, for calculating properties of crystalline solids

=== Other uses in science, technology, and mathematics ===
- .kp, the Internet domain name for North Korea
- KP-bil, or Terrängbil m/42 KP, a Swedish armoured vehicle
- Kilopixel (1,000 pixels), a measure of image resolution
- Kp index, a measure of the global average geomagnetic potential
- Kripke–Platek set theory, a mathematical axiom system
- Kernel panic, a computer stopping in response to an unrecoverable error
- k͡p, the voiceless labial–velar plosive
- Pentax KP, a 2017 digital SLR camera

== Other uses ==
- Kp (digraph), in written language
- KP duty "kitchen police" or "kitchen patrol", U.S. military slang for mess-hall duties
- Knight of the Order of St. Patrick (postnominal KP)

== See also ==
- KP4 (disambiguation)
