= ABC Mid North Coast =

Australian radio station

- Australia
- Broadcast area: Mid North Coast
- Frequencies: 684 KHz AM Kempsey and north, 95.5 MHz FM Port Macquarie / Taree, 756 KHz AM Taree and south, 100.9 MHz FM Gloucester

Programming
- Format: Talk

Ownership
- Owner: Australian Broadcasting Corporation

History
- First air date: 22 January 1954

Technical information
- Transmitter coordinates: 31°26′06.58″S 152°55′01.68″E

Links
- Website: https://www.abc.net.au/midnorthcoast/

ABC Mid North Coast is an ABC Local Radio station based in Port Macquarie and broadcasting to the Mid North Coast region in New South Wales. This includes the towns and cities of Kempsey, Taree and also Lord Howe Island.

The station began as 2KP in 1954 originally as a relay of the national program. Studios were opened in Kempsey in 1956 but local news came from 2NR in Grafton until 1960 when the first locally produced bulletins began. The station relocated to new studios in Port Macquarie in 2004.

ABC Mid North Coast is the originating station of Statewide Afternoons, heard on most of the other ABC Local Radio stations in New South Wales.

Even though Coffs Harbour is in the Mid North Coast region, the city is served by its own ABC Local Radio station, ABC Coffs Coast that broadcast to Coffs Coast and surrounding areas.

The station is heard on these main AM and FM frequencies:

- 2KP 684 AM
- 2TR 756 AM
- 2MRR 95.5 and 100.9 FM

== See also ==
- List of radio stations in Australia
