= 2019 PBA D-League Aspirants' Cup =

Basketball tournament

2019 PBA D-League Aspirant's Cup
- The 8th PBA Aspirant's Cup
- Duration: February 14 - June 25, 2019
- Number of teams: 20
- TV partner(s): 5 Plus (ESPN 5) PBA Rush

Finals
- Champions: Cignal-Ateneo
- Runners-up: CEU

PBA D-League Aspirant's Cup chronology
- < 2018 2020 >

The 2019 PBA D-League Aspirants' Cup is the first conference of the 2019 Philippine Basketball Association Developmental League (PBA D-League) season. This will be the eighth Aspirants' Cup.

== Format ==
Twenty teams were included in the tournament. The elimination round will be divided into two groups of ten teams each. Each team will play the teams in its group once. The top four teams per group qualify for the quarterfinals. The higher-seed team in the quarterfinals will have the twice-to-beat advantage against the lower-seeded team from the other group. The quarterfinals winners advance to the semifinals, which is a best-of-3 series. The semifinals winners advance to the Finals, which is a best-of-5 series.

== Venues ==
Venues of the PBA D-League

Most games will be played at the Ynares Sports Arena in Pasig. Other venues include the Paco Arena in Manila, JCSGO Gym and the Trinity University of Asia, both in Quezon City.

== Teams ==
Returning teams from the 2018 PBA D-League Foundation Cup:

- AMA Online Education Titans
- Batangas EAC Generals
- CEU Scorpions
- Che'Lu Bar and Grill Revellers
- Go for Gold Scratchers
  - Partnered with the Benilde Blazers
- Marinerong Pilipino Skippers

Returning teams from previous conferences:

- Cignal Hawkeyes
  - Partnered with the Ateneo Blue Eagles
- Perpetual Altas
- Wangs Basketball Couriers

New teams:

- CD14 Designs–Trinity White Stallions
- Diliman College Blue Dragons–Gerry's Grill
- FamilyMart–Enderun Titans
- FEU Tamaraws
- McDavid Apparels
- Metropac Movers–San Beda Red Lions
- Petron–Letran Knights
- SMDC–NU Bulldogs
- Ironcon–UST Growling Tigers
- Valencia City–San Sebastian Stags
- Virtual Reality–St. Clare Saints

On May 7, the Cha Dao–FEU Tamaraws dropped the sponsorship by Cha Dao Milk Tea for lack of payments. FEU team manager Richie Ticzon said Cha Dao owed them a "substantial amount of money."

The Far Eastern University now plan to press charges against James Machate after FEU and Cha Dao owner James Marcaida convened following their split in the 2019 PBA D-League.

== Elimination round ==
=== Group A ===
==== Team standings ====
Pos	Team	W	L	PCT	GB	Qualification
1	Cignal-Ateneo Hawkeyes	8	1	.889	—	Twice-to-beat in quarterfinals
2	Virtual Reality-St. Clare Saints	6	3	.667 (Note: Head-to-head quotient: Virtual Reality-St. Clare 1.05, Go for Gold-CSB 1.01, Che'Lu 1.00, Petron-Letran 0.98, Ironcon-UST 0.97)	2	Twice-to-beat in quarterfinals
3	Go for Gold-CSB Scratchers	6	3	.667	2	Twice-to-win in quarterfinals
4	Che'Lu Bar and Grill Revellers	6	3	.667	2	Twice-to-win in quarterfinals
5	Petron-Letran Knights	6	3	.667	2	Eliminated
6	Ironcon-UST Growling Tigers	6	3	.667	2	Eliminated
7	FamilyMart-Enderun Titans	2	7	.222 (Note: Head-to-head quotient: FamilyMart-Enderun 1.11, Batangas-EAC 0.99, AMA 0.92)	6	Eliminated
8	Batangas-EAC Generals	2	7	.222	6	Eliminated
9	AMA Online Education Titans	2	7	.222	6	Eliminated
10	McDavid Apparels	1	8	.111	7	Eliminated

Rules for classification: 1) winning percentage; 2) if two teams are tied, head-to-head record; if three or more teams are tied, head-to-head goal average (quotient); 3) overall quotient 4) coin toss

==== Results ====
Teams	AMA	BAT	CHE	CIG	FAM	GFG	MCD	PET	UST	VRE
AMA Online Education Titans	—	122–119	77–115	81–111	94–116	91–109	80–65	91–108	108–113	89–119
Batangas-EAC Generals		—	63–89	46–90	91–90	87–102	79–57	73–115	70–94	73–80
Che'Lu Bar and Grill Revellers			—	88–102	77–72	92–101	109–99	96–94	92–80	77–82
Cignal-Ateneo Hawkeyes				—	82–68	103–75	106–31	83–64	98–112	88–66
FamilyMart-Enderun Titans					—	69–78	68–73	70–77	81–74	64–71
Go for Gold-CSB Scratchers						—	119–101	107–87	82–94	78–92
McDavid Apparels							—	64–89	90–111	82–93
Petron-Letran Knights								—	114–101	91–90
Ironcon-UST Growling Tigers									—	78–75
Virtual Reality-St. Clare Saints										—

Source: PBA.ph
Legend: Blue = left column team win; Red = top row team win.
Matches with lighter background shading were decided after overtime.

=== Group B ===
==== Team standings ====
Pos	Team	W	L	PCT	GB	Qualification
1	Valencia City-San Sebastian Stags	8	1	.889	—	Twice-to-beat in quarterfinals
2	CEU Scorpions	7	2	.778	1	Twice-to-beat in quarterfinals
3	Metropac Movers-San Beda Red Lions	6	3	.667 (Note: Head-to-head record: Cha Dao-FEU 1–0 Metropac Movers-San Beda)	2	Twice-to-win in quarterfinals
4	Cha Dao-FEU Tamaraws	6	3	.667	2	Twice-to-win in quarterfinals
5	Marinerong Pilipino Skippers	5	4	.556	3	Eliminated
6	Diliman Blue Dragons	4	5	.444 (Note: Head-to-head record: Diliman 1–0 SMDC-NU)	4	Eliminated
7	SMDC-NU Bulldogs	4	5	.444	4	Eliminated
8	Wangs Basketball Couriers	3	6	.333	5	Eliminated
9	Perpetual Help Altas	2	7	.222	6	Eliminated
10	CD14 Designs-Trinity White Stallions	0	9	.000	8	Eliminated

Rules for classification: 1) winning percentage; 2) if two teams are tied, head-to-head record; if three or more teams are tied, head-to-head goal average (quotient); 3) overall quotient 4) coin toss

==== Results ====
Teams	CDD	CEU	DIL	FEU	MAR	MET	SMDC	UPHD	VAL	WAN
CD14 Designs-Trinity White Stallions	—	69–93	51–88	81–106	72–91	70–119	75–107	75–86	82–105	69–89
CEU Scorpions		—	93–76	69–74	93–76	80–77	67–74	90–65	71–65	116–72
Diliman-Gerry's Grill Blue Dragons			—	81–88	86–85	55–67	82–70	65–71	80–91	108–95
Cha Dao-FEU Tamaraws				—	63–87	51–75	84–62	83–64	53–75	71–63
Marinerong Pilipino Skippers					—	88–85*	86–71	90–76	104–110*	78–88
Metropac Movers-San Beda Red Lions						—	94–86	85–75	92–96*	94–70
SMDC-NU Bulldogs							—	100–74	73–82	102–71
Perpetual Altas								—	75–106	64–75
Valencia City-San Sebastian Stags									—	96–64
Wangs Basketball Couriers										—

Source: PBA.ph
Legend: Blue = left column team win; Red = top row team win.
Matches with lighter background shading were decided after overtime.

== Playoff bracket ==
Quarterfinals
(A1 twice-to-beat)
A1	Cignal-Ateneo	67
B4	Cha Dao-FEU	60
(B1 twice-to-beat)
B1	Valencia City-San Sebastian	93
A4	Che'Lu	87
(B2 twice-to-beat)
B2	CEU	81	84
A3	Go for Gold-CSB	84	74
(A2 twice-to-beat)
A2	Virtual Reality-St. Clare	65
B3	Metropac Movers-San Beda	60

Semifinals (Best-of-3 series)
A1	Cignal-Ateneo	2
B1	Valencia City-San Sebastian	0
B2	CEU	2
A2	Virtual Reality-St. Clare	1

Finals (Best-of-5 series)
A1	Cignal-Ateneo	3
B2	CEU	1

== Quarterfinals ==
Higher seeded teams has the twice-to-beat advantage against the lower seeded teams of the other group.

=== (A1) Cignal-Ateneo vs. (B4) Cha Dao-FEU ===
5 Plus

May 27
2:00 p.m.

Cignal-Ateneo Hawkeyes 67, Cha Dao-FEU Tamaraws 60
Scoring by quarter: 11–17, 21–19, 16–10, 19–14
Pts: Ange Kouame 14; Rebs: Ange Kouame 14	Pts: Cade Flores 14; Rebs: Cade Flores 7
Cignal-Ateneo wins series in one game

Ynares Sports Arena, Pasig

=== (B1) Valencia City-San Sebastian vs. (A4) Che'Lu ===
5 Plus

May 27
4:00 p.m.

Valencia City-San Sebastian Stags 93, Che'Lu Bar and Grill Revellers 87 (OT)
Scoring by quarter: 21–18, 23–12, 17–23, 19–27, Overtime: 13-7
Pts: JM Calma 19; Rebs: JM Calma 11	Pts: Rey Suerte 18; Rebs: Rey Suerte 9
Valencia City-San Sebastian wins series in one game

Ynares Sports Arena, Pasig

=== (A2) Virtual Reality-St. Clare vs. (B3) Metropac Movers-San Beda ===
5 Plus

May 28
4:00 p.m.

Virtual Reality-St. Clare Saints 65, Metropac Movers-San Beda Red Lions 60
Scoring by quarter: 10–10, 19–15, 22–13, 14–22
Pts: Joshua Fontanilla 12; Rebs: Mohammad Pare 10	Pts: James Canlas 14; Rebs: Donald Tankoua 12
Virtual Reality-St. Clare wins series in one game

Ynares Sports Arena, Pasig

=== (B2) CEU vs. (A3) Go for Gold-CSB ===
5 Plus

May 28
2:00 p.m.

CEU Scorpions 81, Go for Gold-CSB Scratchers 84
Scoring by quarter: 21–26, 14–24, 28–23, 20–11
Pts: Judel Fuentes 22; Rebs: Maodo Malick Diuof 17	Pts: Roosevelt Adams 26; Rebs: Roosevelt Adams 13

Ynares Sports Arena, Pasig

5 Plus

May 30
4:00 p.m.

CEU Scorpions 84, Go for Gold-CSB Scratchers 74
Scoring by quarter: 24–20, 20–16, 22–15, 18–23
Pts: Maodo Malick Diuof 25; Rebs: Maodo Malick Diuof 29	Pts: Roosevelt Adams 26; Rebs: Roosevelt Adams 11
CEU wins series in two games

Ynares Sports Arena, Pasig

== Semifinals ==
This round is in a best-of-3 format. The winner advances to the finals.

=== (A1) Cignal-Ateneo vs. (B1) Valencia City-San Sebastian ===
5 Plus

June 3
4 p.m.

Cignal-Ateneo Hawkeyes 105, Valencia City-San Sebastian Stags 67
Scoring by quarter: 17-19, 17-16, 32-19, 39-13
Pts: Ange Kouame 19; Rebs: Ange Kouame 20	Pts: RK Ilagan 14; Rebs: Allyn Bulanadi 7

Paco Arena, Manila

5 Plus

June 6
2 p.m.

Cignal-Ateneo Hawkeyes 100, Valencia City-San Sebastian Stags 73
Scoring by quarter: 19-28, 31-17, 28-7, 22-21
Pts: Thirdy Ravena 19; Rebs: Ange Kouame 18	Pts: RK Ilagan 22; Rebs: RK Ilagan 11
Cignal-Ateneo wins series 2–0

Ynares Sports Arena, Pasig

=== (B2) CEU vs. (A2) Virtual Reality-St. Clare ===
5 Plus

June 3
2 p.m.

CEU Scorpions 76, Virtual Reality-St. Clare Saints 75
Scoring by quarter: 15-9, 17-22, 22-17, 22-27
Pts: Maodo Diouf 19; Rebs: Maodo Diouf 33	Pts: Irven Palencia 18; Rebs: Irven Palencia 8

Paco Arena, Manila

5 Plus

June 6
4 p.m.

CEU Scorpions 50, Virtual Reality-St. Clare Saints 84
Scoring by quarter: 7-14, 12-22, 11-24, 20-24
Pts: Franz Diaz 17; Rebs: Maodo Diouf 22	Pts: Mohammed Pare 17; Rebs: Mohammed Pare 15

Ynares Sports Arena, Pasig

June 11
4 p.m.

CEU Scorpions 89, Virtual Reality-St. Clare Saints 72
Scoring by quarter: 16-21, 22-18, 29-13, 22-20
Pts: Rich Guinitaran 23; Rebs: Dave Bernabe 14	Pts: Junjie Hallare 19; Rebs: Joshua Fontanilla 6
CEU wins series 2–1

Ynares Sports Arena, Pasig

== Finals: (A1) Cignal-Ateneo vs. (B2) CEU ==
This round is in a best-of-5 format. The winner wins the championship.

5 Plus

June 13
4 p.m.

Cignal-Ateneo Hawkeyes 101, CEU Scorpions 66
Scoring by quarter: 25-16, 29-15, 26-14, 21-21
Pts: Isaac Go 17; Rebs: Thirdy Ravena 7	Pts: Maodo Diouf 21; Rebs: Maodo Diouf 11

Filoil Flying V Arena, San Juan

5 Plus

June 18
4 p.m.

Cignal-Ateneo Hawkeyes 74, CEU Scorpions 77
Scoring by quarter: 13-16, 26- 18, 13-19, 22-24
Pts: Adrian Wong 17; Rebs: Ange Kouame 10	Pts: Jerome Santos 28; Rebs: Maodo Diouf 16

Ynares Sports Arena, Pasig

5 Plus

June 20
4 p.m.

Cignal-Ateneo Hawkeyes 67, CEU Scorpions 52
Scoring by quarter: 17-13, 15-14, 17-10, 18-15
Pts: Thirdy Ravena 12; Rebs: Thirdy Ravena 8	Pts: Maodo Diouf 19; Rebs: Maodo Diouf 20

Ynares Sports Arena, Pasig

5 Plus

June 25
4 p.m.

Cignal-Ateneo Hawkeyes 98, CEU Scorpions 66
Scoring by quarter: 38-10, 10-17, 31-20, 19-19
Pts: Ange Kouame 18; Rebs: Ange Kouame 16	Pts: Rich Guinitaran 20; Rebs: Rich Guinitaran 4
Cignal-Ateneo wins series 3-1

Ynares Sports Arena, Pasig
