= 2018 Filoil Flying V Preseason Premier Cup =

Men's Finals	G1	Wins
Ateneo Blue Eagles	76	1
San Beda Red Lions	62	0
- Duration: June 30, 2018
- Arena(s): Filoil Flying V Centre
- Winning coach: Sandy Arespacochaga
- Semifinalists: FEU Tamaraws (3rd Place); Benilde Blazers
- TV network(s): ESPN 5
Juniors' Finals	G1	Wins
Malayan Red Robins	78	1
San Beda Red Cubs	72	0
- Duration: June 30, 2018
- Arena(s): Filoil Flying V Centre
- Finals MVP: Clint Escamis
- Semifinalists: FEU–D Baby Tamaraws; NUNS Bullpups (3rd Place)

The 2018 Filoil Flying V Preseason Premier Cup (also known as the Hanes Presents 2018 Chooks-to-Go Filoil Flying V Preseason Premier Cup for sponsorship reasons) was the thirteenth preseason high school and collegiate basketball tournament organized by Filoil Flying V Sports. All 8 teams from the UAAP and 10 teams from the NCAA, together with the 23-man Gilas Pilipinas pool for the 2023 FIBA Basketball World Cup to be hosted by the Philippines competed in the senior's tournament.

This is the first season to be broadcast on ESPN 5, after ending its 10-year relationship with ABS-CBN Sports which was concluded following the 2016 edition of the cup.

== Teams ==
Legend
NCAA team	UAAP team

=== Seniors' Division ===
Senior A
Ateneo Blue Eagles
De La Salle Green Archers
EAC Generals
Gilas Pilipinas
Mapúa Cardinals
NU Bulldogs
San Beda Red Lions
UE Red Warriors
UP Fighting Maroons
Perpetual Altas

Senior B
Adamson Soaring Falcons
Arellano Chiefs
Letran Knights
Benilde Blazers
FEU Tamaraws
JRU Heavy Bombers
Lyceum Pirates
San Sebastian Stags
UST Growling Tigers

=== Juniors' Division ===
Junior A
Ateneo Blue Eaglets
Letran Squires
FEU–D Baby Tamaraws
La Salle Green Hills Greenies
Malayan Red Robins
NUNS Bullpups
San Beda Red Cubs

== Tournament format ==
Due to different number of groups in men's and juniors' division, each had its own competition format.

=== Men's division ===
The tournament format for men's division are as follows:

- During elimination round, teams will only play against teams in their group in a single round-robin schedule.
- At the end of the eliminations, the top four teams in each group will advance to the quarterfinal round.
- At the quarterfinals:
  - Seeds #1 in group A meets #4 of group B (QF1)
  - Seeds #2 in group B meets #3 of group A (QF2)
  - Seeds #1 in group B meets #4 of group A (QF3)
  - Seeds #2 in group A meets #3 of group B (QF4)
- Winner of QF1 meets winner of QF2 while QF3 winner meets QF4 winner in the semifinals.
- Winners of the semifinals will play for the Final round, while losers will battle for third place.
- The quotient system shall be applied in case of a tie in the standings between two or more teams.
- Only one foreign player shall play at a time in the court.

=== Juniors' division ===
The tournament format for junior's division are as follows:

- During elimination round, teams will only play against teams in their group in a single round-robin schedule.
- The top six teams in overall standings will qualify for the playoffs. The top two teams automatically advances to the semifinals.
- At the quarterfinals, team #3 meets #6 while #4 meets #5.
- At the semifinals, winners of the quarterfinals between #3 and #6 will face team #2, while #1 will play against the winner between #4 and #5.
- Winners of the semifinals will play for the finals, while losers will battle for third place.
- The quotient system shall be applied in case of a tie in the standings between two or more teams.

== Men's division ==
=== Elimination round ===
==== Group A ====
===== Team standings =====
#	Team	W	L	PCT	GB	Tie
1	Ateneo Blue Eagles	9	0	1.000	–	
2	San Beda Red Lions	7	2	0.778	2	+2
3	De La Salle Green Archers	7	2	0.778	2	−2
4	UP Fighting Maroons	6	3	0.667	3	
5	Gilas Pilipinas	4	5	0.444	5	+19
6	Mapúa Cardinals	4	5	0.444	5	−19
7	UE Red Warriors	3	6	0.333	6	+4
8	NU Bulldogs	3	6	0.333	6	−4
9	Perpetual Altas	2	7	0.222	7	
10	EAC Generals	0	9	0.000	9	

Qualified to the quarterfinals

===== Schedule =====
Team ╲ Game	1	2	3	4	5	6	7	8	9
Ateneo	Ateneo school colors	San Beda school colors	UP school colors	UE school colors	NU school colors	UPHD school colors	EAC school colors	Mapua school colors	La Salle school colors
La Salle	UP school colors	Ateneo school colors	UPHD school colors	EAC school colors	UE school colors	Mapua school colors	San Beda school colors	NU school colors	Ateneo school colors
EAC	Mapua school colors	UE school colors	NU school colors	La Salle school colors	UP school colors	Ateneo school colors	UPHD school colors	Ateneo school colors	San Beda school colors
GILAS	Ateneo school colors	La Salle school colors	San Beda school colors	UPHD school colors	UP school colors	NU school colors	UE school colors	Mapua school colors	EAC school colors
Mapúa	UP school colors	EAC school colors	NU school colors	UPHD school colors	UE school colors	La Salle school colors	Ateneo school colors	Ateneo school colors	San Beda school colors
NU	San Beda school colors	Mapua school colors	UP school colors	EAC school colors	Ateneo school colors	UPHD school colors	Ateneo school colors	UE school colors	La Salle school colors
San Beda	NU school colors	Ateneo school colors	Ateneo school colors	UP school colors	La Salle school colors	UPHD school colors	UE school colors	Mapua school colors	EAC school colors
UE	EAC school colors	Ateneo school colors	Ateneo school colors	La Salle school colors	Mapua school colors	UP school colors	NU school colors	UPHD school colors	San Beda school colors
UP	La Salle school colors	Mapua school colors	Ateneo school colors	NU school colors	Ateneo school colors	UPHD school colors	EAC school colors	UE school colors	San Beda school colors
Perpetual	Ateneo school colors	La Salle school colors	UP school colors	NU school colors	Mapua school colors	Ateneo school colors	UE school colors	San Beda school colors	EAC school colors

= Win; = OT win; = Win by forfeit; = Loss; = OT loss; = Loss by forfeit

===== Results =====
Team	ADMU	DLSU	EAC	GILAS	MU	NU	SBU	UE	UP	UPHSD
Ateneo		81–75*	108–44	75–69	99–55	94–60	69–68	83–61	100–72	83–59
La Salle			83–51	91–72	102–95	73–66	70–72	71–62	82–79	96–83
EAC				69–82	74–77	84–96	48–75	59–73	70–83	67–83
GILAS					97–78	81–86	70–91	63–61	72–78	72–63
Mapua						87–82	60–95	84–92	79–78	20–0 (Note: Win by forfeit)
NU							61–71	74–78	57–73	69–61
San Beda								73–50	54–56	74–68
UE									61–66	75–95
UP										77–63
Perpetual										

Legend: Blue = left column team win; Red = top row team win.
Matches with lighter background shading were decided after overtime.
Notes:
- Number of asterisks (*) denotes the number of overtime periods.

==== Group B ====
===== Team standings =====
#	Team	W	L	PCT	GB	Tie
1	Benilde Blazers	7	1	0.875	–	
2	FEU Tamaraws	6	2	0.750	1	+11
3	Adamson Soaring Falcons	6	2	0.750	1	−11
4	Letran Knights	5	3	0.625	2	
5	San Sebastian Stags	4	4	0.500	3	
6	Arellano Chiefs	3	5	0.375	4	+17
7	Lyceum Pirates	3	5	0.375	4	−17
8	UST Growling Tigers	2	6	0.250	5	
9	JRU Heavy Bombers	0	8	0.000	7	

Qualified to the quarterfinals

===== Schedule =====
Team ╲ Game	1	2	3	4	5	6	7	8
Adamson	Letran school colors	UST school colors	FEU school colors	Arellano school colors	JRU school colors	CSB school colors	SSC-R school colors	Lyceum school colors
Arellano	FEU school colors	SSC-R school colors	Lyceum school colors	CSB school colors	Adamson school colors	JRU school colors	Letran school colors	UST school colors
Letran	UST school colors	FEU school colors	Lyceum school colors	Adamson school colors	JRU school colors	SSC-R school colors	CSB school colors	Arellano school colors
Benilde	JRU school colors	Lyceum school colors	FEU school colors	Arellano school colors	UST school colors	Adamson school colors	Letran school colors	SSC-R school colors
FEU	Arellano school colors	Letran school colors	JRU school colors	CSB school colors	Adamson school colors	UST school colors	SSC-R school colors	Lyceum school colors
JRU	Lyceum school colors	CSB school colors	FEU school colors	UST school colors	SSC-R school colors	Letran school colors	Adamson school colors	Arellano school colors
Lyceum	JRU school colors	SSC-R school colors	Arellano school colors	Letran school colors	CSB school colors	FEU school colors	UST school colors	Adamson school colors
San Sebastian	Arellano school colors	Lyceum school colors	UST school colors	JRU school colors	Letran school colors	FEU school colors	Adamson school colors	CSB school colors
UST	Letran school colors	SSC-R school colors	JRU school colors	Adamson school colors	CSB school colors	FEU school colors	Lyceum school colors	Arellano school colors

= Win; = OT win; = Loss; = OT loss

===== Results =====
Team	AdU	AU	CSJL	CSB	FEU	JRU	LPU	SSC	UST
Adamson		67–61	83–80	80–60	64–75	74–67	85–75	84–89	87–64
Arellano			63–71	69–74	65–74	76–74	93–76	68–61	73–82
Letran				88–89*	77–80	94–71	78–74	81–73	95–90
Benilde					80–73	104–83	92–68	87–79	99–87
FEU						87–85	68–89	78–66	86–82
JRU							69–90	88–96	88–98
Lyceum								54–74	93–88
San Sebastian									79–71
UST									

Legend: Blue = left column team win; Red = top row team win.
Matches with lighter background shading were decided after overtime.
- Number of asterisks (*) denotes the number of overtime periods.

=== Bracket ===
Quarter-finals
(A1) Ateneo	74
(B4) Letran	72
(B2) FEU	76
(A3) La Salle	69
(B1) Benilde	76
(A4) UP	74
(A2) San Beda	64
(B3) Adamson	62

Semi-finals
(A1) Ateneo	50
(B2) FEU	38
(B1) Benilde	71
(A2) San Beda	78

Final
(A1) Ateneo	76
(A2) San Beda	62
Battle-for-Third
(B2) FEU	78
(B1) Benilde	58

=== Quarterfinals ===
All times are local (UTC+8).

N/A

June 28
1:00 PM

Benilde Blazers	76–74	UP Fighting Maroons
Scoring by quarter: 18–16, 21–21, 19–17, 18–20
Pts: Clement Leutcheu 16; Rebs: Leutcheu, Gutang, 7 each Asts: Justin Gutang 8		Pts: Bright Akhuetie 22; Rebs: Bright Akhuetie 9 Asts: Jun Manzo 5

Filoil Flying V Arena, San Juan

N/A

June 28
2:45 PM

San Beda Red Lions	64–62	Adamson Soaring Falcons
Scoring by quarter: 10–10, 17–11, 13–13, 24–28
Pts: Robert Bolick 23; Rebs: Donald Tankoua 12; Asts: Robert Bolick 3		Pts: Sean Manganti 20; Rebs: Papi Sarr 12; Asts: Sean Manganti 6

Filoil Flying V Arena, San Juan

ESPN 5

June 28
4:30 PM

FEU Tamaraws	76–69	De La Salle Green Archers
Scoring by quarter: 15–11, 20–16, 17–19, 24–23
Pts: Hubert Cani 22; Rebs: Barkley Eboña 11; Asts: Jasper Parker 4		Pts: Andrei Caracut 15; Rebs: Caracut, Baltazar, 8 each Asts: Andrei Caracut 5

Filoil Flying V Arena, San Juan

ESPN 5

June 28
7:00 PM

Ateneo Blue Eagles	74–72	Letran Knights
Scoring by quarter: 15–17, 15–18, 26–17, 18–20
Pts: Ma. Nieto, Mi. Nieto, 9 each Rebs: Angelo Kouame 13; Asts: Matt Nieto 4		Pts: J.P. Calvo 16; Rebs: Christian Fajarito 7 Asts: Bong Quinto 4

Filoil Flying V Arena, San Juan

=== Semifinals ===
All times are local (UTC+8).

ESPN 5

June 29
4:30 PM

Ateneo Blue Eagles	50–38	FEU Tamaraws
Scoring by quarter: 9–16, 12–6, 9–8, 20–8
Pts: Thirdy Ravena 7 Rebs: Angelo Kouame 15; Asts: Tyler Tio 2		Pts: Prince Orizu 11; Rebs: Prince Orizu 13; Asts: Hubert Cani 2

Filoil Flying V Arena, San Juan

AksyonTV

June 29
7:00 PM

Benilde Blazers	71–78	San Beda Red Lions
Scoring by quarter: 19–20, 15–20, 19–14, 18–24
Pts: Justin Gutang 22; Rebs: Clement Leutcheu 10; Asts: James Pasturan 5		Pts: Tankoua, Eugene, 14 each Rebs: Javee Mocon 12; Asts: Robert Bolick 4

Filoil Flying V Arena, San Juan

=== Battle for Third ===
All times are local (UTC+8).

ESPN 5

June 30
4:00 PM

FEU Tamaraws	78–58	Benilde Blazers
Scoring by quarter: 12–17, 20–7, 24–16, 22–18
Pts: Tuffin, Nunag, 9 each Rebs: Orizu, Eboña, 7 each Asts: LJ Gonzales 4		Pts: Belgica, Nayve, 12 each Rebs: Rob Nayve 7 Asts: 3 players, 2 each

Filoil Flying V Arena, San Juan

=== Final ===
All times are local (UTC+8).

ESPN 5

June 30
6:30 PM

Ateneo Blue Eagles	76–62	San Beda Red Lions
Scoring by quarter: 19–15, 26–11, 11–16, 20–20
Pts: Angelo Kouame 15; Rebs: Angelo Kouame 16; Asts: 6 players, 2 each		Pts: Javee Mocon 14; Rebs: Javee Mocon 12; Asts: Mocon, Abuda, 2 each

Filoil Flying V Arena, San Juan

== Juniors' division ==
=== Elimination round ===
==== Team standings ====
#	Team	W	L	PCT	GB	Tie
1	Ateneo Blue Eaglets	1	0	1.000	–	
2	NUNS Bullpups	1	0	1.000	–	
3	Malayan Red Robins	1	0	1.000	–	
4	San Beda Red Cubs	1	1	0.500	1	
5	La Salle Green Hills Greenies	0	1	0.000	1.5	
6	Letran Squires	0	1	0.000	1.5	+2
7	FEU–D Baby Tamaraws	0	1	0.000	1.5	-3

Bye to the semi-finals
Qualified to the quarterfinals

==== Schedule ====
Team ╲ Game	1	2	3	4	5	6
ADMU	Letran school colors	FEU school colors	NU school colors	Mapua school colors	CSB school colors	San Beda school colors
CSJL	Ateneo school colors	NU school colors				
FEU–D	NU school colors	Ateneo school colors	Letran school colors			
LSGH	Mapua school colors	San Beda school colors	Ateneo school colors			
MHSS	CSB school colors	San Beda school colors	Ateneo school colors	CSB school colors		
NSNU	FEU school colors	Ateneo school colors	Letran school colors			
SBU–R	Mapua school colors	CSB school colors	Ateneo school colors			

= Win; = OT win; = Loss; = OT loss

==== Results ====
Team	ADMU	CSJL	FEU-D	LSGH	MHSS	NSNU	SBU-R
ADMU		75–70	–	–	–	–	–
CSJL			–	–	–	–	–
FEU–D				–	–	54–67	–
LSGH					–	–	80–79
MHSS						–	74–70
NSNU							–
SBU–R							

Legend: Blue = left column team win; Red = top row team win.
Matches with lighter background shading were decided after overtime.
- Number of asterisks (*) denotes the number of overtime periods.

=== Bracket ===
Semi-finals
Malayan	88**
FEU–Diliman	86
San Beda–Rizal	82
NSNU	81

Final
Malayan	78
San Beda–Rizal	72
Battle-for-Third
NSNU	97
FEU–Diliman	90

=== Semifinals ===
All times are local (UTC+8).

June 29, 2018
1:00 PM

Malayan Red Robins	88–86 (2OT)	FEU–D Baby Tamaraws
Scoring by quarter: 10–18, 16–12, 25–20, 19–20, Overtime: 18–16
Pts: Paolo Hernandez 23; Rebs: Briedyn Smith 17; Asts: Clint Escamis 6		Pts: RJ Abarrientos 19; Rebs: Ron Tolentino 17; Asts: Royce Alforque 8

Filoil Flying V Arena, San Juan

June 29, 2018
2:45 PM

San Beda Red Cubs	82–81	NUNS Bullpups
Scoring by quarter: 25–14, 19–17, 18–28, 20–22
Pts: Josiah Alcantara 16; Rebs: Justine Sanchez 10; Asts: 3 players, 2 each		Pts: Cyril Gonzales 18; Rebs: Kevin Quiambao 12; Asts: Ernest Felicida 6

Filoil Flying V Arena, San Juan

=== Battle for Third ===
All times are local (UTC+8).

June 30, 2018
12:00 PM

FEU–D Baby Tamaraws	90–97	NUNS Bullpups
Scoring by quarter: 26–17, 21–29, 17–33, 26–18
Pts: RJ Abarrientos 24; Rebs: 3 players, 7 each Asts: RJ Abarrientos 6		Pts: Harold Alarcon 23; Rebs: 3 players, 6 each Asts: Kevin Quiambao 5

Filoil Flying V Arena, San Juan

=== Final ===
All times are local (UTC+8).

June 30, 2018
2:00 PM

Malayan Red Robins	78–72	San Beda Red Cubs
Scoring by quarter: 13–18, 22–19, 18–15, 25–20
Pts: Clint Escamis 30; Rebs: 3 players, 10 each Asts: Karl Mariano 5		Pts: Jade Talampas 20; Rebs: Justine Sanchez 19; Asts: Anfernee Estacio 4

Filoil Flying V Arena, San Juan

== Final standings ==
Juniors

Rank	Team
1st place, gold medalist(s)	Malayan Red Robins
2nd place, silver medalist(s)	San Beda Red Cubs
3rd place, bronze medalist(s)	NUNS Bullpups
4	FEU–D Baby Tamaraws

Seniors

Rank	Team
1st place, gold medalist(s)	Ateneo Blue Eagles
2nd place, silver medalist(s)	San Beda Red Lions
3rd place, bronze medalist(s)	FEU Tamaraws
4	Benilde Blazers
5	De La Salle Green Archers
6	Adamson Soaring Falcons
7	UP Fighting Maroons
8	Letran Knights

=== Individual awards ===
Juniors

- Most Valuable Player: Clint Escamis ( Malayan High School of Science)
- Mythical Five:
  - Clint Escamis ( Malayan High School of Science)
  - Briedyn Smith ( Malayan High School of Science)
  - Inand Fornilos ( La Salle Greenhills)
  - Royce Alforque ( FEU)
  - Rhayyan Amsali ( San Beda)
- Best Defensive Player: Inand Fornilos ( La Salle Greenhills)

Seniors

- Most Valuable Player: Angelo Kouame ( Ateneo)
- Mythical Five:
  - Angelo Kouame ( Ateneo)
  - Justine Baltazar ( La Salle)
  - Thirdy Ravena ( Ateneo)
  - Javee Mocon ( San Beda)
  - Matt Nieto ( Ateneo)
- Best Defensive Player: Prince Eze ( Perpetual Help)
