= 2019 PCCL National Collegiate Championship =

16th annual PCCL basketball tournament

Men's Finals	G1	Wins
Ateneo Blue Eagles	57	1
San Beda Red Lions	46	0
- Duration: March 8, 2020
- Arena(s): Filoil Flying V Centre, San Juan
- Finals MVP: SJ Belangel
- Winning coach: Gabby Severino

The 2019 PCCL National Collegiate Championship is the eleventh edition of the Philippine Collegiate Champions League (PCCL) in its current incarnation, the postseason tournament to determine the national collegiate champions in basketball. The tournament will be the 16th edition overall.

Due to the adjustments done in the schedules of most collegiate basketball tournaments due to the Philippines' hosting of the 2019 Southeast Asian Games, the National Collegiate Championship commenced in February 2020.

== Tournament format ==
The tournament format was unveiled in November 2019.

- Qualifying round
  - UAAP–NCAA Challenge
    - 2 teams from the University Athletic Association of the Philippines (UAAP)
    - 2 teams from the National Collegiate Athletic Association (NCAA)
  - Luzon qualifiers
    - 1 team from University Athletic Association of the Philippines (UAAP)
    - 1 team from NCR
    - 1 team from North/Central Luzon
    - 1 team from South Luzon/Bicol
  - Visayas/Mindanao qualifiers
    - 2 teams from Cebu Schools Athletic Foundation, Inc. (CESAFI)
    - 1 team from Visayas
    - 3 teams from Mindanao
- Final round
  - Luzon qualifiers winner
  - Visayas/Mindanao qualifiers winner
  - top two teams from UAAP–NCAA challenge

== Qualifying teams ==
=== UAAP–NCAA Challenge ===
School	Team	League	City/Town
Ateneo de Manila University	Ateneo Blue Eagles	UAAP	Quezon City
Colegio de San Juan de Letran	Letran Knights	NCAA	Manila
San Beda University	San Beda Red Lions	NCAA	Manila
University of Santo Tomas	UST Growling Tigers	UAAP	Manila

=== Luzon ===
School	Team	League	City/Town
Annunciation College of Bacon Sorsogon	ACBS Panthers	BICCS	Sorsogon City
Diliman College	DC Blue Dragons	UCBL	Quezon City
~~Don Honorio Ventura State University~~ (Note: DHVSU (the champions of the North/Central Luzon Regional Qualifiers) pulled out of the tournament on February 7, 2020, following a memo from Tournament Director and Commissioner Joe Lipa. The NCF Tigers were named as their replacement after finishing as the runners-up of the Bicol Regional Qualifiers.)	~~DHVSU Wildcats~~	UCAAP	Bacolor
Naga College Foundation	NCF Tigers	BUCAL	Naga
University of the Philippines	UP Fighting Maroons	UAAP	Quezon City

=== Visayas/Mindanao ===
School	Team	League	City/Town
Asian College–Dumaguete	AC Lightnings	CSL (Escandor Cup)	Dumaguete
~~Holy Cross of Davao College~~ (Note: The HCDC Wildcats and the MATS Navigators were originally included in the Visayas/Mindanao Regional Championship, but the tournament was postponed when the Davao City government ordered all public activities to be postponed due to the ongoing COVID-19 pandemic. The tournament was later moved to Dumaguete and played from March 2 to 4.)	~~HCDC Crusaders~~	CSL (Escandor Cup)	Davao City
Holy Trinity College of General Santos City	HTC Wildcats	CSL (Escandor Cup)	General Santos
~~MATS College of Technology~~	~~MATS Navigators~~	CSL (Escandor Cup)	Davao City
Southwestern University	SWU Cobras	CESAFI	Cebu City
University of the Visayas	UV Green Lancers	CESAFI	Cebu City

== Qualifying rounds ==
All times are local (UTC+8).

=== UAAP–NCAA Challenge qualifiers ===
Pos	Team	W	L	PCT	GB	Qualification	Ateneo	San Beda	UST	Letran
1	Ateneo Blue Eagles	3	0	1.000	—	Final four	—	83–69	82–71	79–61
2	San Beda Red Lions	2	1	.667	1	Final four		—	77–68	76–53
3	UST Growling Tigers	1	2	.333	2				—	95–65
4	Letran Knights	0	3	.000	3					—

Source: Philippine Collegiate Champions' League
Rules for classification: 1) winning percentage; 2) head-to-head record; 3) head-to-head quotient; 4) overall quotient

February 8, 2020
2:00 p.m.

Boxscore

Letran Knights	65–95	UST Growling Tigers
Scoring by quarter: 17–26, 11–29, 10–20, 27–20
Pts: Reyson 12; Rebs: Rocacurva 7 Asts: Yu 5		Pts: Cansino 13; Rebs: Chabi Yo 10; Asts: Garing 4

Filoil Flying V Centre, San Juan

February 8, 2020
4:00 p.m.

Boxscore

Ateneo Blue Eagles	83–69	San Beda Red Lions
Scoring by quarter: 16–12, 21–14, 20–18, 26–25
Pts: Belangel 25; Rebs: Kouame 14; Asts: Belangel 5		Pts: Oftana 11; Rebs: Oftana 8 Asts: Oftana 4

Filoil Flying V Centre, San Juan

February 9, 2020
2:00 p.m.

Boxscore

San Beda Red Lions	76–53	Letran Knights
Scoring by quarter: 21–16, 16–13, 20–16, 19–8
Pts: Oftana 17; Rebs: Kwekuteye 10; Asts: Oftana 6		Pts: Ambohot 13; Rebs: Ambohot, Muyang, 7 each Asts: Yu 3

Filoil Flying V Centre, San Juan

February 9, 2020
4:00 p.m.

Boxscore

UST Growling Tigers	71–82	Ateneo Blue Eagles
Scoring by quarter: 15–29, 23–19, 27–18, 6–16
Pts: Abando, Cuajao 14 each Rebs: Chabi Yo 6 Asts: Manalang 6		Pts: Belangel 26; Rebs: Kouame 13; Asts: Mamuyac 5

Filoil Flying V Centre, San Juan

February 15, 2020
1:00 p.m.

Boxscore

San Beda Red Lions	77–68	UST Growling Tigers
Scoring by quarter: 19–13, 20–14, 23–19, 15–22
Pts: Kwekuteye 14; Rebs: Cariño, Kwekuteye 7 each Asts: Kwekuteye 7		Pts: Cansino 21; Rebs: Cansino, Chabi Yo 9 each Asts: Nonoy 4

Filoil Flying V Centre, San Juan

February 15, 2020
3:00 p.m.

Boxscore

Letran Knights	61–79	Ateneo Blue Eagles
Scoring by quarter: 16–11, 19–24, 4–30, 22–14
Pts: Javillonar 15; Rebs: Ambohot 8 Asts: Reyson 3		Pts: Mallillin, D. Ramos 16 each Rebs: Kouame 12; Asts: Tio 5

Filoil Flying V Centre, San Juan

=== Luzon qualifiers ===
Pos	Team	W	L	PCT	GB	Qualification	UP	DC	NCF	ACBS
1	UP Fighting Maroons	3	0	1.000	—	Final four	—	78–75	83–45	94–44
2	Diliman Blue Dragons	2	1	.667	1			—	77–61	86–62
3	NCF Tigers	1	2	.333	2				—	78–57
4	Annunciation Panthers	0	3	.000	3					—

Source: Philippine Collegiate Champions' League
Rules for classification: 1) winning percentage; 2) head-to-head record; 3) head-to-head quotient; 4) overall quotient

One Media TV 48

February 9, 2020
4:00 p.m.

Diliman Blue Dragons	86–62	Annunciation Panthers
Scoring by quarter: 25–8, 21–18, 16–14, 24–22

Jesse M. Robredo Coliseum, Naga

One Media TV 48

February 9, 2020
6:00 p.m.

UP Fighting Maroons	83–45	NCF Tigers
Scoring by quarter: 29–7, 14–12, 23–7, 17–19

Jesse M. Robredo Coliseum, Naga

One Media TV 48

February 10, 2020
4:00 p.m.

Annunciation Panthers	44–94	UP Fighting Maroons
Scoring by quarter: 7–19, 18–23, 13–27, 6–25

Jesse M. Robredo Coliseum, Naga

One Media TV 48

February 10, 2020
6:00 p.m.

Diliman Blue Dragons	77–61	NCF Tigers
Scoring by quarter: 22–11, 13–15, 22–17, 20–18

Jesse M. Robredo Coliseum, Naga

One Media TV 48

February 11, 2020
3:30 p.m.

NCF Tigers	78–57	Annunciation Panthers
Scoring by quarter: –, –, –, –

Jesse M. Robredo Coliseum, Naga

One Media TV 48

February 11, 2020
5:30 p.m.

UP Fighting Maroons	78–75	Diliman Blue Dragons
Scoring by quarter: –, –, –, –

Jesse M. Robredo Coliseum, Naga

=== Visayas/Mindanao qualifiers ===
Pos	Team	W	L	PCT	GB	Qualification	UV	SWU	AC	HTC
1	UV Green Lancers	3	0	1.000	—	Final four	—	76–67	89–69	97–79
2	SWU Cobras	2	1	.667	1			—	74–47	80–63
3	AC Lightnings	1	2	.333	2				—	87–84
4	HTC Wildcats	0	3	.000	3					—

Source: Philippine Collegiate Champions' League
Rules for classification: 1) winning percentage; 2) head-to-head record; 3) head-to-head quotient; 4) overall quotient

March 2, 2020
5:00 p.m.

Holy Trinity Wildcats	79–97	UV Green Lancers

Lamberto Macias Sports and Cultural Center, Dumaguete

March 2, 2020
6:30 p.m.

AC Lightnings	47–74	SWU Cobras

Lamberto Macias Sports and Cultural Center, Dumaguete

March 3, 2020
5:00 p.m.

SWU Cobras	80–63	Holy Trinity Wildcats

Lamberto Macias Sports and Cultural Center, Dumaguete

March 3, 2020
6:30 p.m.

UV Green Lancers	89–69	AC Lightnings

Lamberto Macias Sports and Cultural Center, Dumaguete

March 4, 2020
5:00 p.m.

Holy Trinity Wildcats	84–87	AC Lightnings

Lamberto Macias Sports and Cultural Center, Dumaguete

March 4, 2020
6:30 p.m.

UV Green Lancers	76–67	SWU Cobras

Lamberto Macias Sports and Cultural Center, Dumaguete

== Final four ==
=== Bracket ===
Semifinals
March 7
Ateneo	95
UV	63
March 7
UP	63
San Beda	65

Final
March 8
Ateneo	57
San Beda	46
Third place
March 8
UV	93
UP	63

=== Semifinals ===
March 7, 2020
2:00 p.m.

Boxscore

Ateneo Blue Eagles	95–63	UV Green Lancers
Scoring by quarter: 22–10, 15–21, 25–26, 33–6
Pts: SJ Belangel 20; Rebs: Kouame 9 Asts: Gian Mamuyac 8		Pts: Lassina Coulibaly 21; Rebs: Lassina Coulibaly 9 Asts: Gabriel Cometa 7

Ynares Sports Arena, Pasig
Referees: J. Serapia, O. Angeles, R. Bermejo

March 7, 2020
4:00 p.m.

Boxscore

UP Fighting Maroons	63–65	San Beda Red Lions
Scoring by quarter: 10–14, 20–11, 10–24, 23–16
Pts: Ricci Rivero 27; Rebs: James Spencer 8 Asts: James Spencer 6		Pts: Calvin Oftana 16; Rebs: James Kwekuteye 8 Asts: Franz Abuda 3

Ynares Sports Arena, Pasig
Referees: B. Jullia, C. Bautista, M. De Guzman

=== Third place ===
March 8, 2020
2:00 p.m.

Boxscore

UV Green Lancers	93–63	UP Fighting Maroons
Scoring by quarter: 18–14, 26–14, 32–20, 17–15
Pts: Jancork Cabahug 21; Rebs: Lassina Coulibaly 15; Asts: Gabriel Cometa 4		Pts: 3 players 13 each Rebs: Bruel Kamga 8 Asts: 3 players 3 each

Filoil Flying V Centre, San Juan
Referees: L. Julia, M. De Guzman, R. Bermejo

=== Final ===
March 8, 2020
4:00 p.m.

Boxscore

Ateneo Blue Eagles	57–46	San Beda Red Lions
Scoring by quarter: 18–17, 16–8, 5–16, 18–5
Pts: Kouame 17; Rebs: Kouame 17; Asts: Tio, Navarro 2 each		Pts: Calvin Oftana 14; Rebs: Calvin Oftana 6 Asts: Pedro Alfaro 3

Filoil Flying V Centre, San Juan

== Awards ==
- Most Valuable Player: SJ Belangel (Ateneo Blue Eagles)
- Mythical Five:
  - SJ Belangel (Ateneo Blue Eagles)
  - Ange Kouame (Ateneo Blue Eagles)
  - Lassina Coulibaly (UV Lancers)
  - Calvin Oftana (San Beda Red Lions)
  - Ralph Penuela (San Beda Red Lions)
