= Philippines at the 2027 FIBA Basketball World Cup qualification =

Sports team

Philippines
- Head coach: Tim Cone
- First Round: Third Place, 2–4
- Second Round: Currently fifth, 4–4
- Scoring leader: Kai Sotto 15.5
- Rebounding leader: Kai Sotto 15
- Assists leader: Justin Brownlee 4.6
- Biggest win: 87–46 Guam (November 28, 2025)
- Biggest defeat: 49–92 Australia (July 6, 2026)
| Home | Away |
- All statistics correct as of August 29, 2026.

The Philippines men's national basketball team is currently competing in the 2027 FIBA World Cup Qualifiers as it seeks to qualify for the 2027 FIBA World Cup which will be hosted by Qatar from August 27 to September 12, 2027. The Philippines was drawn into Group A alongside Australia, New Zealand, and Guam in the first round, before advancing to the second round and joining Group E with Australia, Iran, Jordan, New Zealand, and Syria.

The Philippines is seeking its fourth consecutive appearance in the FIBA Basketball World Cup, following its participation in the 2014, 2019, and 2023 editions.

== Background ==
Following the team's 24th place finish in the 2023 FIBA Basketball World Cup, the Philippines continued its international campaign under head coach Tim Cone, who took over as head coach in September 2023. Shortly after the World Cup, Cone led the Philippines a gold medal at the 2022 Asian Games after defeating Jordan 70–60 in the final to win the country's first men's basketball gold medal at the Asian Games since 1962.

The team also participated in the 2024 FIBA Men's Olympic Qualifying Tournament, where it defeated Latvia 89–80 in the opening game, marking its first victory over a European national team in an official FIBA tournament in 64 years. The Philippines subsequently lost to Georgia and Brazil, falling short of qualification for the 2024 Summer Olympics.

At the subsequent 2025 FIBA Asia Cup, the Philippines reached the quarterfinals before being eliminated by Australia, 84–60.

== First round ==
The Philippines was drawn into Group A of the first round of the Asian qualifiers, alongside Australia, New Zealand, and Guam. The team played six games in total, facing each opponent twice. Head coach Tim Cone acknowledged the difficulty of the group before the qualifiers, stating, “We know it's going to be tough, but we look forward to it. Tough challenges lie ahead.” The Philippines finished third in the group with two wins and four losses, advancing to the second round alongside Australia and New Zealand.

| Pos | Team | Pld | W | L | PF | PA | PD | Pts | Qualification | (Australia) | (New Zealand) | (Philippines) | (Guam) |
|---|---|---|---|---|---|---|---|---|---|---|---|---|---|
| 1 | Australia | 6 | 6 | 0 | 565 | 403 | +162 | 12 | Second round | — | 84–79 | 92–49 | 124–52 |
| 2 | New Zealand | 6 | 4 | 2 | 559 | 473 | +86 | 10 | Second round | 77–79 | — | 106–102 | 129–75 |
| 3 | Philippines | 6 | 2 | 4 | 465 | 477 | −12 | 8 | Second round | 66–93 | 66–69 | — | 95–71 |
| 4 | Guam | 6 | 0 | 6 | 391 | 627 | −236 | 6 | | 80–93 | 67–99 | 46–87 | — |

Source: FIBA
Rules for classification: 1) Points; 2) Head-to-head results; 3) Points difference; 4) Points scored.

=== Game 1: Guam ===
This was the first competitive game between Guam and the Philippines.

November 28, 2025
19:00

Boxscore

| Guam | 46–87 | Philippines |
Scoring by quarter: 17–17, 12–23, 7–24, 10–23
| Pts: Cruz 17; Rebs: Galloway 7 Asts: Cruz, Simon 2 | | Pts: Brownlee 22; Rebs: Fajardo, Millora-Brown 10; Asts: Newsome 5 |

UOG Calvo Field House, Mangilao, Guam
Attendance: 2,364
Referees: Park Kyoung-jin (KOR), Sun Jian (CHN), Lee Kyoung-hwan (KOR)

The Philippines opened their 2027 FIBA Basketball World Cup Asian Qualifiers campaign with an 87–46 victory over Guam. The two teams were tied at 17–17 after the first quarter, with Guam led by Filipino-Guamanian Jericho Cruz, who scored 13 points in the opening period. The Philippines then pulled away in the second quarter, outscoring Guam 23–12 to take a 40–29 halftime lead. The Philippines continued to dominate after the break, limiting Guam to seven points in the third quarter while scoring 24 of its own, to eventually take the 41-point victory. Cruz finished as Guam's leading scorer with 17 points, along with two rebounds and two assists.

Justin Brownlee led the team with 22 points, while Dwight Ramos added 10. June Mar Fajardo and Quentin Millora-Brown each grabbed 10 rebounds, with the Philippines recording 61 rebounds in the game, setting a new Asian Qualifiers record.

| Starters: | | | Pts | Reb | Ast |
|---|---|---|---|---|---|
| G | 12 | Joe Blas | 0 | 5 | 0 |
| G | 30 | Takumi Simon | 0 | 4 | 2 |
| G | 39 | Jericho Cruz | 17 | 2 | 2 |
| F | 42 | Tai Wesley | 12 | 4 | 1 |
| C | 5 | Jonathan Galloway | 8 | 8 | 1 |
| Reserves: | | | | | |
| G | 2 | Isaiah Africano | 0 | 0 | 0 |
| F | 3 | Mark Johnson | 4 | 2 | 1 |
| G | 4 | Tomas Calvo | 0 | 1 | 0 |
| G | 9 | Kirston Guzman | 3 | 0 | 0 |
| PG | 22 | Daren Hechanova | 0 | 3 | 0 |
| G | 31 | DJ Osborn | 0 | 0 | 0 |
| PF | 35 | Matt Fegurgur | 2 | 4 | 0 |
Head coach:
(Guam Basketball Confederation) EJ Calvo

| Guam | Philippines |

| Guam | Statistics | Philippines |
|---|---|---|
| 12/36 (33%) | 2-pt field goals | 31/61 (51%) |
| 5/34 (15%) | 3-pt field goals | 4/16 (25%) |
| 7/8 (88%) | Free throws | 13/17 (77%) |
| 13 | Offensive rebounds | 20 |
| 23 | Defensive rebounds | 41 |
| 37 | Total rebounds | 61 |
| 7 | Assists | 22 |
| 15 | Turnovers | 10 |
| 8 | Steals | 9 |
| 7 | Blocks | 10 |
| 16 | Fouls | 11 |

| Starters: | | | Pts | Reb | Ast |
|---|---|---|---|---|---|
| PG | 24 | Dwight Ramos | 10 | 6 | 3 |
| SG | 9 | Scottie Thompson | 7 | 5 | 4 |
| PF | 32 | Justin Brownlee | 22 | 2 | 2 |
| C | 15 | June Mar Fajardo | 8 | 10 | 1 |
| C | 42 | Quentin Millora-Brown | 6 | 10 | 1 |
| Reserves: | | | | | |
| G | 3 | Chris Newsome | 2 | 3 | 5 |
| G | 4 | Rhon Jhay Abarrientos | 5 | 2 | 0 |
| G | 17 | CJ Perez | 7 | 2 | 0 |
| PF | 25 | Japeth Aguilar | 2 | 3 | 1 |
| F | 28 | Kevin Quiambao | 7 | 1 | 3 |
| F | 33 | Carl Tamayo | 3 | 3 | 1 |
| C | 34 | AJ Edu | 8 | 8 | 1 |
Head coach:
(USA Basketball) Tim Cone

=== Game 2: Guam ===
This was the second competitive guam between Guam and the Philippines, with the latter winning the first 3 days prior by 41 points.

December 1, 2025
19:30

Boxscore

| Philippines | 95–71 | Guam |
Scoring by quarter: 32–15, 18–21, 22–19, 23–16
| Pts: Brownlee 20; Rebs: Millora-Brown 9 Asts: Brownlee 8 | | Pts: Cruz 27; Rebs: Galloway 18; Asts: Cruz, Galloway 3 |

Blue Eagle Gym, Quezon City, Philippines
Attendance: 3,788
Referees: Takaki Kato (JPN), Zhang Xiao (CHN), Daigo Urushima (JPN)

The Philippines won their second game of thir qualifier campaign after defeating Guam 95–71 to complete a sweep of the first qualifying window. The Philippines started strongly, building a 32–15 lead after the first quarter and extending it to 50–36 at halftime. Guam mounted a comeback in the third quarter behind Jericho Cruz, who led a 24–6 run that cut the Philippines' lead to nine points at 53–44. The Philippines responded with a 7–1 run to restore control and entered the fourth quarter leading 72–55 before eventually pulling away for the 24-point victory. Cruz finished with 27 points for Guam, while Justin Brownlee led the Philippines with 20 points, five rebounds, and seven assists.

The game also marked the final appearance of Japeth Aguilar for the Philippines, as he retired from international basketball after 16 years with the national team. Aguilar, who had represented the Philippines at the 2014, 2019, and 2023 FIBA World Cups, finished the game with three points and a rebound.

| Starters: | | | Pts | Reb | Ast |
|---|---|---|---|---|---|
| PG | 24 | Dwight Ramos | 19 | 7 | 1 |
| SG | 9 | Scottie Thompson | 5 | 0 | 3 |
| PF | 25 | Japeth Aguilar | 3 | 1 | 0 |
| PF | 32 | Justin Brownlee | 20 | 5 | 8 |
| C | 15 | June Mar Fajardo | 7 | 3 | 3 |
| Reserves: | | | | | |
| G | 3 | Chris Newsome | 10 | 2 | 3 |
| G | 4 | Rhon Jhay Abarrientos | 0 | 1 | 0 |
| G | 17 | CJ Perez | 2 | 2 | 0 |
| F | 28 | Kevin Quiambao | 12 | 4 | 5 |
| F | 33 | Carl Tamayo | 4 | 1 | 1 |
| C | 34 | AJ Edu | 4 | 7 | 2 |
| C | 42 | Quentin Millora-Brown | 9 | 9 | 1 |
Head coach:
(USA Basketball) Tim Cone

| Philippines | Guam |

| Philippines | Statistics | Guam |
|---|---|---|
| 24/40 (60%) | 2-pt field goals | 12/33 (36%) |
| 6/19 (32%) | 3-pt field goals | 11/39 (28%) |
| 29/35 (83%) | Free throws | 14/22 (64%) |
| 11 | Offensive rebounds | 17 |
| 34 | Defensive rebounds | 19 |
| 45 | Total rebounds | 36 |
| 27 | Assists | 8 |
| 19 | Turnovers | 16 |
| 7 | Steals | 6 |
| 4 | Blocks | 2 |
| 20 | Fouls | 23 |

| Starters: | | | Pts | Reb | Ast |
|---|---|---|---|---|---|
| G | 12 | Joe Blas | 4 | 1 | 0 |
| G | 30 | Takumi Simon | 23 | 4 | 1 |
| G | 39 | Jericho Cruz | 27 | 0 | 3 |
| F | 42 | Tai Wesley | 5 | 4 | 1 |
| C | 5 | Jonathan Galloway | 10 | 18 | 3 |
| Reserves: | | | | | |
| G | 2 | Isaiah Africano | 2 | 0 | 0 |
| F | 3 | Mark Johnson | 0 | 1 | 0 |
| G | 4 | Tomas Calvo | 0 | 1 | 0 |
| PG | 22 | Daren Hechanova | 0 | 2 | 0 |
| PF | 24 | Ben Borja II | 0 | 0 | 0 |
| G | 31 | DJ Osborn | 0 | 2 | 0 |
| PF | 35 | Matt Fegurgur | 2 | 4 | 0 |
Head coach:
(Guam Basketball Confederation) EJ Calvo

=== Game 3: New Zealand ===
This was the ninth competitive meeting between New Zealand and the Philippines, with the Tall Blacks having won the previous two encounters. The two teams last met in the group stage of the 2025 FIBA Asia Cup, where New Zealand won by eight points, 94–86.

February 26, 2026
19:30

Boxscore

| Philippines | 66–69 | New Zealand |
Scoring by quarter: 21–25, 16–12, 9–20, 20–12
| Pts: Ramos 16; Rebs: Edu 11; Asts: Edu, Perez 3 | | Pts: Darling 11; Rebs: Mennenga 14; Asts: three players 4 |

SM Mall of Asia Arena, Pasay, Philippines
Attendance: 12,054
Referees: Sun Jian (CHN), Daigo Urushima (JPN), Park Kyoung-jin (KOR)

The Philippines suffered their first loss to New Zealand, 66–69. The game was closely contested throughout its duration, with both teams tied at 37–37 at halftime. The Philippines briefly took the lead early in the third quarter before New Zealand responded with a 20–5 run to take a 57–46 lead entering the fourth. The Philippines mounted a late comeback, cutting the deficit to two points with less than a minute remaining, but New Zealand held on after the Philippines missed a potential game-tying three-pointer at the buzzer. Dwight Ramos led the Philippines with 16 points, while AJ Edu recorded 11 rebounds.

Head coach Tim Cone acknowledged the team's strong comeback but remained disappointed with the result, saying, “We're not gonna take pride in almost winning. We're here to win and we didn't do that.”

| Starters: | | | Pts | Reb | Ast |
|---|---|---|---|---|---|
| G | 17 | CJ Perez | 15 | 3 | 3 |
| PG | 24 | Dwight Ramos | 16 | 8 | 1 |
| F | 8 | Calvin Oftana | 3 | 3 | 0 |
| PF | 32 | Justin Brownlee | 4 | 6 | 2 |
| C | 34 | AJ Edu | 5 | 11 | 3 |
| Reserves: | | | | | |
| PG | 1 | Juan Gómez de Liaño | 10 | 1 | 2 |
| G | 3 | Chris Newsome | 0 | 0 | 0 |
| SG | 9 | Scottie Thompson | 1 | 3 | 2 |
| C | 15 | June Mar Fajardo | 0 | 2 | 1 |
| F | 28 | Kevin Quiambao | 2 | 0 | 0 |
| F | 33 | Carl Tamayo | 3 | 1 | 0 |
| C | 42 | Quentin Millora-Brown | 7 | 6 | 2 |
Head coach:
(USA Basketball) Tim Cone

| Philippines | New Zealand |

| Philippines | Statistics | New Zealand |
|---|---|---|
| 19/43 (44%) | 2-pt field goals | 15/37 (41%) |
| 7/37 (19%) | 3-pt field goals | 9/30 (30%) |
| 7/13 (54%) | Free throws | 12/24 (50%) |
| 15 | Offensive rebounds | 15 |
| 34 | Defensive rebounds | 38 |
| 49 | Total rebounds | 53 |
| 16 | Assists | 20 |
| 11 | Turnovers | 18 |
| 9 | Steals | 5 |
| 5 | Blocks | 3 |
| 21 | Fouls | 20 |

| Starters: | | | Pts | Reb | Ast |
|---|---|---|---|---|---|
| PG | 5 | Taylor Britt | 5 | 2 | 0 |
| SG | 6 | Taine Murray | 3 | 3 | 1 |
| F | 8 | Sam Mennenga | 10 | 14 | 4 |
| SF | 20 | Jordan Ngatai | 3 | 6 | 4 |
| PF | 16 | Tohi Smith-Milner | 2 | 1 | 0 |
| Reserves: | | | | | |
| F | 1 | Reuben Te Rangi | 7 | 3 | 3 |
| F | 2 | Carlin Davison | 5 | 3 | 3 |
| PG | 7 | Alex McNaught | 10 | 2 | 4 |
| PF | 10 | Yanni Wetzell | 4 | 2 | 0 |
| F | 12 | Max Darling | 11 | 0 | 0 |
| G | 22 | Keanu Rasmussen | 0 | 0 | 0 |
| C | 24 | Tyrell Harrison | 9 | 7 | 1 |
Head coach:
(Basketball New Zealand) Judd Flavell

=== Game 4: Australia ===
This was the fourth competitive game between Australia and the Philippines, with the Boomers having won all previous three. The two teams last met on the quarterfinals of the 2025 FIBA Asia Cup where Australia won by 24 points, 84–60. The Philippines had yet to defeat Australia in competitive play, losing the previous three meetings by an average margin of 25.3 points.

March 1, 2026
19:30

Boxscore

| Philippines | 66–93 | Australia |
Scoring by quarter: 13–14, 20–24, 20–30, 13–25
| Pts: Brownlee 20; Rebs: Brownlee 8 Asts: Brownlee 7 | | Pts: Pepper 28; Rebs: Kay 8 Asts: Creek 5 |

SM Mall of Asia Arena, Pasay, Philippines
Attendance: 17,301
Referees: Park Kyoung-jin (KOR), Sun Jian (CHN), Yuen Chun Yip (HKG)

The Philippines suffered their second consecutive loss in their campaign after falling to Australia by 27 points, 66–93, in front of 17,301 home fans. The game remained closely contested in the first half, with Australia holding only a five-point lead at halftime, 38–33. Australia then broke the game open in the third quarter, outscoring the Philippines 30–20 and extending its lead to 68–53 before pulling further away in the final period.

Justin Brownlee led the Philippines with 20 points, eight rebounds and seven assists, while Quentin Millora-Brown added 11 points and seven rebounds. Australia's Elijah Pepper led all scorers with 28 points and seven rebounds. This loss left the Philippines with a 2–2 record in Group A, with the team having already secured qualification to the second round of the qualifiers.

| Starters: | | | Pts | Reb | Ast |
|---|---|---|---|---|---|
| G | 17 | CJ Perez | 3 | 2 | 2 |
| PG | 24 | Dwight Ramos | 9 | 2 | 3 |
| SG | 9 | Scottie Thompson | 3 | 1 | 1 |
| PF | 32 | Justin Brownlee | 20 | 8 | 7 |
| C | 34 | AJ Edu | 6 | 6 | 0 |
| Reserves: | | | | | |
| PG | 1 | Juan Gómez de Liaño | 0 | 4 | 2 |
| G | 3 | Chris Newsome | 4 | 1 | 1 |
| F | 8 | Calvin Oftana | 3 | 3 | 2 |
| C | 15 | June Mar Fajardo | 2 | 1 | 0 |
| F | 28 | Kevin Quiambao | 3 | 2 | 1 |
| F | 33 | Carl Tamayo | 2 | 1 | 0 |
| C | 42 | Quentin Millora-Brown | 11 | 7 | 0 |
Head coach:
(USA Basketball) Tim Cone

| Philippines | Australia |

| Philippines | Statistics | Australia |
|---|---|---|
| 13/33 (39%) | 2-pt field goals | 20/41 (49%) |
| 9/31 (29%) | 3-pt field goals | 15/42 (36%) |
| 13/16 (81%) | Free throws | 8/9 (89%) |
| 10 | Offensive rebounds | 18 |
| 29 | Defensive rebounds | 32 |
| 39 | Total rebounds | 50 |
| 19 | Assists | 21 |
| 12 | Turnovers | 5 |
| 4 | Steals | 6 |
| 3 | Blocks | 3 |
| 10 | Fouls | 13 |

| Starters: | | | Pts | Reb | Ast |
|---|---|---|---|---|---|
| PG | 12 | Tom Wilson | 12 | 7 | 4 |
| G | 17 | Tanner Krebs | 18 | 4 | 3 |
| G | 40 | Elijah Pepper | 28 | 7 | 2 |
| PF | 15 | Nick Kay | 8 | 8 | 1 |
| C | 13 | Sam Froling | 3 | 7 | 3 |
| Reserves: | | | | | |
| G | 2 | Isaac White | 5 | 1 | 2 |
| PG | 6 | Reyne Smith | 0 | 1 | 0 |
| G | 7 | Kody Stattmann | 0 | 0 | 0 |
| SF | 14 | Jack White | 6 | 2 | 1 |
| G | 21 | Jacob Holt | 0 | 0 | 0 |
| G | 55 | Mitch Creek | 12 | 8 | 5 |
Head coach:
(Basketball Australia) John Rillie

=== Game 5: New Zealand ===
This was the tenth competitive meeting between New Zealand and the Philippines, with the Tall Blacks having won the previous three encounters. The two teams last met in the second window of the Asian Qualifiers where New Zealand won the closely contested game, 69–66.

July 3, 2026
19:00

Boxscore

| New Zealand | 106–102 (2OT) | Philippines |
Scoring by quarter: 23–17, 21–22, 19–25, 20–19, Overtime: 10–10, 13–9
| Pts: Te Rangi 22; Rebs: Waardenburg 10; Asts: Ili 6 | | Pts: Gómez de Liaño, Quiambao 23; Rebs: Brownlee 8 Asts: Abarrientos 10 |

Spark Arena, Auckland, New Zealand
Attendance: 8,690
Referees: Daigo Urushima (JPN), Chan Owe Shiong (MAS), Chuang Chih-chun (TPE)

The Philippines suffered their third consecutive loss after falling to New Zealand 102–106 in double overtime. The game was closely contested throughout, with 13 lead changes and 13 ties. New Zealand led 44–39 at halftime, but the Philippines rallied in the third quarter to take a 64–63 lead heading into the final period. Juan Gomez de Liaño hit a three-pointer with 11.9 seconds remaining in regulation to tie the game at 83–83 and force overtime, before hitting another three with 8.3 seconds left in the first overtime to put the Philippines ahead 93–91 but New Zealand's Tai Webster answered to tie the game and force a second overtime. The Philippines later built a 100–96 lead in the second overtime, but New Zealand rallied behind Reuben Te Rangi and Sam Mennenga, who hit the go-ahead basket with 52.2 seconds remaining. Kevin Quiambao briefly tied the game again, but New Zealand closed with a 10–2 run to win 106–102.

| Starters: | | | Pts | Reb | Ast |
|---|---|---|---|---|---|
| PG | 5 | Taylor Britt | 4 | 1 | 2 |
| PG | 51 | Shea Ili | 21 | 1 | 6 |
| F | 8 | Sam Mennenga | 13 | 6 | 3 |
| F | 93 | Sam Waardenburg | 16 | 10 | 1 |
| SF | 20 | Jordan Ngatai | 3 | 6 | 1 |
| Reserves: | | | | | |
| PG | 0 | Tai Webster | 12 | 2 | 3 |
| F | 1 | Ruben Te Rangi | 22 | 4 | 1 |
| F | 2 | Carlin Davidson | 7 | 7 | 1 |
| SG | 6 | Taine Murray | 2 | 1 | 0 |
| PF | 16 | Tohi Smith-Milner | 6 | 4 | 1 |
| G | 22 | Keanu Rasmussen | 0 | 0 | 0 |
| C | 33 | Sam Timmins | 0 | 1 | 0 |
Head coach:
(Basketball New Zealand) Judd Flavell

| New Zealand | Philippines |

| New Zealand | Statistics | Philippines |
|---|---|---|
| 25/48 (52%) | 2-pt field goals | 26/45 (58%) |
| 10/34 (29%) | 3-pt field goals | 12/35 (34%) |
| 26/35 (74%) | Free throws | 14/22 (64%) |
| 19 | Offensive rebounds | 14 |
| 28 | Defensive rebounds | 31 |
| 47 | Total rebounds | 45 |
| 19 | Assists | 26 |
| 16 | Turnovers | 20 |
| 12 | Steals | 7 |
| 4 | Blocks | 5 |
| 23 | Fouls | 27 |

| Starters: | | | Pts | Reb | Ast |
|---|---|---|---|---|---|
| G | 4 | Rhon Jhay Abarrientos | 6 | 5 | 10 |
| PG | 24 | Dwight Ramos | 18 | 4 | 3 |
| F | 33 | Carl Tamayo | 17 | 4 | 1 |
| SF | 18 | Troy Rosario | 2 | 0 | 0 |
| C | 34 | June Mar Fajardo | 0 | 1 | 1 |
| Reserves: | | | | | |
| PG | 1 | Juan Gómez de Liaño | 23 | 6 | 4 |
| G | 3 | Chris Newsome | 0 | 0 | 0 |
| PF | 19 | Justine Baltazar | 0 | 0 | 0 |
| PF | 20 | Mike Phillips | 2 | 3 | 0 |
| F | 28 | Kevin Quiambao | 23 | 3 | 2 |
| PF | 32 | Justin Brownlee | 5 | 8 | 4 |
| C | 34 | AJ Edu | 6 | 4 | 1 |
Head coach:
(USA Basketball) Tim Cone

=== Game 6: Australia ===
This was the fifth competitive game between Australia and the Philippines, with the Boomers having won all previous four. The two teams last met in the second window of the Asian Qualifiers where Australia won by 27 points, 93–66. The Philippines had yet to defeat Australia in competitive play, losing all their meetings by an average margin of 25.7 points.

July 6, 2026
18:30

Boxscore

| Australia | 92–49 | Philippines |
Scoring by quarter: 33–14, 8–13, 22–10, 29–12
| Pts: Cotton 21; Rebs: Bannan 11; Asts: Cotton, Glover 5 | | Pts: Ramos 9 Rebs: Phillips 12; Asts: Farjado, Ramos 3 |

Perth Arena, Perth, Australia
Attendance: 10,037
Referees: Takaki Kato (JPN), Leung Chuen Wing (SGP), Jiang Wenan (CHN)

The Philippines suffered their fourth consecutive loss after falling to Australia 49–92 to close the first round. Playing without naturalized player Justine Bronwlee, who was ruled out due to injuries, the Philippines initially kept pace with Australia after an 8–8 tie in the opening minutes, with Kevin Quiambao leading the charge with two early three-pointers. Australia then responded with a 16–0 run to take a 24–8 lead, with Bryce Cotton scoring 13 points in the first quarter, including three three-pointers, to eventually end the first quarter with a 33–14 lead. The Philippines responded in the second quarter, outscoring Australia 13–8 to cut the deficit to 14 points at halftime, 41–27. However, Australia dominated the second half, outscoring the Philippines 51–22 to pull away for the 43-point victory.

The Philippines' 49 points marked its lowest-scoring performance in the FIBA Asian Qualifiers, while the 43-point defeat was its largest margin of defeat in the campaign. Dwight Ramos led the scoring with nine points, while June Mar Fajardo and Kevin Quiambao added eight each.

With this result, the Philippines finished the first round in third place in Group A with a 2–4 record, carrying that record into the second round, where they will go against Iran, Jordan, and Syria twice. Head coach Tim Cone acknowledged the team's shortcomings after the defeat, saying, “We only competed in stretches and it’s not good enough against a high quality team like this.”

| Starters: | | | Pts | Reb | Ast |
|---|---|---|---|---|---|
| PG | 2 | Taran Armstrong | 4 | 2 | 1 |
| PG | 4 | Tyrese Proctor | 16 | 4 | 4 |
| G | 21 | Alex Condon | 3 | 8 | 2 |
| G | 55 | Mitch Creek | 13 | 7 | 1 |
| SF | 17 | Jack McVeigh | 3 | 1 | 2 |
| Reserves: | | | | | |
| PG | 5 | Angus Glover | 4 | 3 | 4 |
| PG | 6 | Reyne Smith | 3 | 2 | 0 |
| F | 8 | Wani Swaka Lo Buluk | 2 | 0 | 0 |
| PG | 11 | Bryce Cotton | 21 | 2 | 4 |
| PF | 13 | Josh Bannan | 11 | 10 | 1 |
| PF | 25 | Keanu Pinder | 9 | 5 | 2 |
| PF | 50 | David Okwera | 3 | 1 | 0 |
Head coach:
(Basketball Australia) Adam Caporn

| Australia | Philippines |

| New Zealand | Statistics | Philippines |
|---|---|---|
| 21/37 (57%) | 2-pt field goals | 14/40 (35%) |
| 11/43 (26%) | 3-pt field goals | 4/24 (17%) |
| 17/24 (71%) | Free throws | 9/12 (75%) |
| 21 | Offensive rebounds | 13 |
| 32 | Defensive rebounds | 31 |
| 53 | Total rebounds | 44 |
| 21 | Assists | 11 |
| 8 | Turnovers | 19 |
| 12 | Steals | 3 |
| 4 | Blocks | 4 |
| 17 | Fouls | 23 |

| Starters: | | | Pts | Reb | Ast |
|---|---|---|---|---|---|
| G | 4 | Rhon Jhay Abarrientos | 0 | 1 | 1 |
| PG | 24 | Dwight Ramos | 9 | 5 | 3 |
| F | 28 | Kevin Quiambao | 8 | 1 | 0 |
| PF | 20 | Mike Phillips | 6 | 14 | 0 |
| C | 34 | AJ Edu | 5 | 6 | 0 |
| Reserves: | | | | | |
| PG | 1 | Juan Gómez de Liaño | 7 | 0 | 1 |
| G | 3 | Chris Newsome | 0 | 1 | 2 |
| C | 15 | June Mar Fajardo | 8 | 6 | 3 |
| SF | 18 | Troy Rosario | 4 | 2 | 1 |
| PF | 19 | Justine Baltazar | 0 | 0 | 0 |
| PF | 32 | Justin Brownlee | 0 | 0 | 0 |
| F | 33 | Carl Tamayo | 2 | 1 | 0 |
Head coach:
(USA Basketball) Tim Cone

== Second round ==
The Philippines advanced to the second round and was drawn into Group E alongside fellow Group A qualifiers Australia and New Zealand, as well as Iran, Jordan, and Syria from Group C. All results from the first round were carried over into the second round, leaving the Philippines with a 2–4 record entering the next phase. Each team will play six additional games against the three teams from the other first-round group.

A total of eight Asian teams will qualify for the World Cup, with Qatar qualifying automatically as the host. Qatar's results in the second round will count toward the standings, but the team will be excluded from the final rankings. The top three teams from each group will qualify directly, while the fourth-placed teams from Groups E and F will be ranked against each other, with the better-ranked team claiming the final Asian qualification spot.

| Pos | Team | Pld | W | L | PF | PA | PD | Pts | Qualification | (Australia) | (New Zealand) | (Iran) | (Jordan) | (Philippines) | (Syria) |
|---|---|---|---|---|---|---|---|---|---|---|---|---|---|---|---|
| 1 | Australia | 8 | 8 | 0 | 814 | 560 | +254 | 16 | 2027 FIBA Basketball World Cup | — | 84–79 | 28 Feb | 126–93 | 92–49 | 25 Feb |
| 2 | New Zealand | 8 | 6 | 2 | 778 | 638 | +140 | 14 | 2027 FIBA Basketball World Cup | 77–79 | — | 25 Feb | 28 Feb | 106–102 (2OT) | 126–74 |
| 3 | Iran | 8 | 5 | 3 | 599 | 542 | +57 | 13 (Note: Iran 127–122 Jordan) | 2027 FIBA Basketball World Cup | 27 Nov | 91–93 (OT) | — | 60–73 | 30 Nov | 72–68 |
| 4 | Jordan | 8 | 5 | 3 | 684 | 568 | +116 | 13 | Best fourth placed team | 30 Nov | 27 Nov | 49–67 | — | 81–82 (OT) | 74–59 |
| 5 | Philippines | 8 | 4 | 4 | 615 | 614 | +1 | 12 | | 66–93 | 66–69 | 68–56 | 25 Feb | — | 28 Feb |
| 6 | Syria | 8 | 2 | 6 | 534 | 719 | −185 | 10 | | 64–123 | 30 Nov | 52–73 | 48–100 | 27 Nov | — |

Updated to game(s) played on 30 August 2026. Source: FIBA
Rules for classification: 1) Points; 2) Head-to-head results; 3) Points difference; 4) Points scored.

=== Game 7: Jordan ===
This is the sixteenth competitive game between Jordan and the Philippines, with the two teams splitting the last four games. The two teams last met on August 2, 2025, for an exhibition game where the Philippines won by 14 points, 75–61. The last competitive game between the two was a highly contested game on the final window of the 2023 World Cup Qualifiers where Jordan won by a single point, 91–90.

August 28, 2026
20:30

Boxscore

| Jordan | 81–82 (OT) | Philippines |
Scoring by quarter: 28–14, 16–25, 14–15, 14–18, Overtime: 9–10
| Pts: Ibrahim 22; Rebs: Al-Dwairi 11; Asts: Ibrahim 5 | | Pts: Sotto 18; Rebs: Sotto 14; Asts: Gómez de Liaño 6 |

SM Mall of Asia Arena, Pasay, Philippines
Attendance: 12,294
Referees: Rabah Noujaim (LBN), Alexey Stepanenko (KAZ), Chuang Chih-chun (TPE)

The Philippines opened the second round with a dramatic 82–81 overtime victory over Jordan, overcoming an 18-point deficit after Jordan raced to a 26–8 lead with 1:52 remaining in the opening quarter. Jordan entered the second quarter with a 28–14 advantage, but the Philippines responded strongly at both ends of the court, outscoring Jordan 25–16 in the second period to cut the deficit to five at halftime, 44–39. The Philippines continued its momentum in the third quarter, opening with a 12–2 run to take a 51–46 lead. Jordan responded with a 10–0 run of its own, however, and regained the lead, 58–54, entering the fourth quarter. The final period remained closely contested, with the Philippines eventually forcing overtime at 72–72.

Jordan took an early 78–72 lead in overtime. AJ Edu split a pair of free throws before CJ Perez attacked the basket, followed by Kai Sotto putting back a missed Kevin Quiambao three-pointer to give the Philippines a 79–78 lead with 41.5 seconds remaining. Jordan's Jalen Harris drew a foul on the succeeding possession, but Omar Khaled Salman made only one of two free throws, tying the game at 79–79 with 30.6 seconds left. With the game hanging in the balance, Perez drove toward the basket and passed to Quiambao on the wing, who knocked down a three-pointer with 11.7 seconds remaining to put the Philippines ahead 82–79. Perez then fouled out after committing a foul on Freddy Ibrahim, who converted both free throws to make it 82–81.

Jordan was given one final opportunity after the Scottie Thompson was called for a five-second violation following a timeout. The Jordanians went to Abdullah Olajuwon, who drove toward the basket for the potential game-winning layup, but Sotto rejected the attempt as time expired to preserve the victory. The win snapped the Philippines' four-game losing streak in the qualifiers and improved its record to 3–4.

Sotto, playing his first game for the country in two years, led the Philippines with 18 points, 14 rebounds and two blocks, including the decisive block at the end of overtime. Perez added 16 points, with 14 of his points coming in the fourth quarter and overtime, while Quiambao and Dwight Ramos scored 14 each. Edu contributed nine points and 11 rebounds, while Tamayo added eight points despite going down in the third quarter. Perez finished with a team-best +16 plus-minus, followed by Quiambao at +10 and Edu at +5; Scottie Thompson, despite being held to one point, finished with a +13 and played a key defensive role by limiting Harris to just five points after halftime.

| Starters: | | | Pts | Reb | Ast |
|---|---|---|---|---|---|
| G | 2 | Jalen Harris | 19 | 4 | 2 |
| PG | 5 | Freddy Ibrahim | 22 | 4 | 5 |
| SG | 1 | Amin Abu Hawwas | 3 | 2 | 2 |
| SF | 7 | Ahmad Alhamarsheh | 4 | 4 | 0 |
| C | 44 | Ahmad Al Dwairi | 4 | 11 | 2 |
| Reserves: | | | | | |
| PG | 0 | Abdullah Olajuwon | 17 | 3 | 1 |
| SG | 4 | Omar Khaled Mahmoud Salman | 1 | 0 | 0 |
| SF | 9 | Rawhi Kilani | 2 | 1 | 1 |
| C | 13 | Mohammad Shaher | 0 | 3 | 0 |
| C | 21 | Thadi Ammar Alshami | 4 | 2 | 0 |
| G | 22 | Malek Kanaan | 0 | 0 | 0 |
| F | 23 | Saif Al-Deen Saleh | 5 | 3 | 0 |
Head coach:
(Spanish Basketball Federation) Luis Guil

| Jordan | Philippines |

| Jordan | Statistics | Philippines |
|---|---|---|
| 16/41 (39%) | 2-pt field goals | 28/58 (48%) |
| 12/33 (36%) | 3-pt field goals | 4/22 (18%) |
| 13/16 (81%) | Free throws | 14/23 (61%) |
| 13 | Offensive rebounds | 22 |
| 29 | Defensive rebounds | 34 |
| 42 | Total rebounds | 56 |
| 13 | Assists | 20 |
| 11 | Turnovers | 12 |
| 9 | Steals | 4 |
| 2 | Blocks | 5 |
| 21 | Fouls | 17 |

| Starters: | | | Pts | Reb | Ast |
|---|---|---|---|---|---|
| G | 3 | Chris Newsome | 0 | 0 | 0 |
| PG | 24 | Dwight Ramos | 14 | 5 | 2 |
| F | 33 | Carl Tamayo | 8 | 1 | 1 |
| C | 11 | Kai Zachary Sotto | 18 | 14 | 3 |
| C | 15 | June Mar Fajardo | 2 | 1 | 1 |
| Reserves: | | | | | |
| PG | 1 | Juan Gómez de Liaño | 0 | 1 | 6 |
| SG | 9 | Scottie Thompson | 1 | 6 | 3 |
| G | 17 | CJ Perez | 16 | 5 | 1 |
| SF | 18 | Troy Rosario | 0 | 0 | 0 |
| PF | 19 | Justine Baltazar | 0 | 1 | 0 |
| F | 28 | Kevin Quiambao | 14 | 5 | 2 |
| C | 34 | AJ Edu | 9 | 11 | 1 |
Head coach:
(USA Basketball) Tim Cone

=== Game 8: Iran ===
This is the eleventh competitive game between Iran and the Philippines, with Iran winning seven. The two teams last met on the quarterfinals of the 2022 Asian Games where the Philippines won, 84–83.

August 30, 2026
20:00

Boxscore

| Philippines | 68–56 | Iran |
Scoring by quarter: 7–18, 29–16, 13–13, 19–9
| Pts: Ramos 16; Rebs: Sotto 16; Asts: Sotto, Thompson 3 | | Pts: Sheikhi 21; Rebs: Kazemi 7 Asts: Amini 5 |

SM Mall of Asia Arena, Pasay, Philippines
Attendance: 18,308
Referees: Rabah Noujaim (LBN), Yevgeniy Mikheyev (KAZ), Alexey Stepanenko (KAZ)

The Philippines defeated Iran 68–56 to complete a sweep of its two games in the fourth window of the Asian Qualifiers and improve its record to 4–4 in Group E. Iran controlled the opening quarter, limiting the Philippines to just seven points while taking an 18–7 lead. The deficit grew to as many as 13 points early in the second quarter, but the Philippines responded with a 29–16 period to take a 36–34 lead into halftime. Juan Gomez de Liaño, Dwight Ramos and June Mar Fajardo sparked the turnaround, with Fajardo scoring all six of his points in the second quarter.

The game remained close in the third quarter, which ended tied at 13–13, leaving the Philippines with a 49–47 advantage heading into the final period. The Philippines then pulled away in the fourth quarter, outscoring Iran 19–9 to secure the 12-point victory. Ramos and Gomez de Liaño led the Philippines with 16 points each, while Kai Sotto recorded a double-double with 13 points and 16 rebounds. AJ Edu also added eight points, eight rebounds and three blocks.

Fajardo also played his final game for the national team after 13 years with Gilas Pilipinas. The win also marked the Philippines' first victory in a FIBA-sactinoned game over Iran in 13 years, since the two teams met in the second round 2015 FIBA Asia Championship.

This victory gave the Philippines a 4–4 record in Group E, moving the team back into contention for one of the group's top three places and automatic qualification for the 2027 FIBA Basketball World Cup. Iran fell to 5–3 following the defeat.

| Starters: | | | Pts | Reb | Ast |
|---|---|---|---|---|---|
| PG | 24 | Dwight Ramos | 16 | 7 | 1 |
| SG | 9 | Scottie Thompson | 0 | 3 | 3 |
| F | 28 | Kevin Quiambao | 6 | 3 | 1 |
| C | 11 | Kai Zachary Sotto | 13 | 16 | 3 |
| C | 34 | AJ Edu | 8 | 8 | 1 |
| Reserves: | | | | | |
| PG | 1 | Juan Gómez de Liaño | 16 | 3 | 1 |
| G | 3 | Chris Newsome | 0 | 1 | 0 |
| C | 15 | June Mar Fajardo | 6 | 2 | 0 |
| G | 17 | CJ Perez | 3 | 1 | 0 |
| SF | 18 | Troy Rosario | 0 | 0 | 0 |
| PF | 19 | Justine Baltazar | 0 | 0 | 0 |
| C | 21 | Justin Arana | 0 | 0 | 0 |
Head coach:
(USA Basketball) Tim Cone

| Philippines | Iran |

| Philippines | Statistics | Iran |
|---|---|---|
| 13/27 (48%) | 2-pt field goals | 14/34 (41%) |
| 7/25 (28%) | 3-pt field goals | 8/31 (26%) |
| 21/27 (78%) | Free throws | 4/6 (67%) |
| 8 | Offensive rebounds | 6 |
| 37 | Defensive rebounds | 25 |
| 45 | Total rebounds | 31 |
| 10 | Assists | 12 |
| 16 | Turnovers | 11 |
| 5 | Steals | 9 |
| 4 | Blocks | 1 |
| 14 | Fouls | 24 |

| Starters: | | | Pts | Reb | Ast |
|---|---|---|---|---|---|
| PG | 55 | Seyed Mahdi Jafari | 4 | 1 | 4 |
| G | 11 | Mohammad Mahdi Heydari | 4 | 1 | 0 |
| F | 17 | Matin Aghajanpour | 6 | 3 | 0 |
| PF | 14 | Arsalan Kazemi | 2 | 7 | 2 |
| C | 51 | Salar Monji | 5 | 7 | 0 |
| Reserves: | | | | | |
| PG | 5 | Mobin Sheikhi | 21 | 2 | 1 |
| F | 6 | Mohammad Amini | 7 | 7 | 5 |
| SG | 10 | Piter Girgoorian | 5 | 1 | 1 |
| PF | 12 | Arman Zangeneh | 0 | 0 | 0 |
| F | 13 | Mohammad Jamshidi | 0 | 1 | 2 |
| C | 20 | Salar Taheri | 2 | 0 | 0 |
| C | 32 | Hasan Aliakbari | 0 | 0 | 0 |
Head coach:
(Hellenic Basketball Federation) Sotirios Manolopoulos

=== Game 9: Syria ===
This will be the second competitive game between Syria and the Philippines. The two teams first met on the fifth place game of the 2018 Asian Games which the Philippines comfortably won, 109–55.

November 27, 2026

Boxscore

| Syria | vs. | Philippines |

Malaysia

=== Game 10: Iran ===
This will be the twelfth competitive game between the Iran and the Philippines. The two teams last met on the fourth window of the Asian Qualifiers where Gilas won, 68–56.

November 30, 2026

Boxscore

| Iran | vs. | Philippines |

Malaysia

=== Game 11: Jordan ===
This will be the seventeenth competitive game between Jordan and the Philippines.

February 25, 2027

Boxscore

| Philippines | vs. | Jordan |

=== Game 12: Syria ===
This will be the third competitive game between Syria and the Philippines.

February 28, 2027

Boxscore

| Philippines | vs. | Syria |

== Player statistics ==
Legend
| GP | Games played | GS | Games started | MPG | Minutes per game |
| FG% | Field-goal percentage | 3P% | 3-point field-goal percentage | FT% | Free-throw percentage |
| RPG | Rebounds per game | APG | Assists per game | SPG | Steals per game |
| BPG | Blocks per game | PPG | Points per game |

Philippines at the 2027 FIBA Basketball World Cup Qualification statistics
| Player | GP | GS | MPG | FG% | 3P% | FT% | RPG | APG | SPG | BPG | PPG |
|---|---|---|---|---|---|---|---|---|---|---|---|
| Kai Zachary Sotto | 2 | 2 | 34.6 | .400 | .000 | .538 | 15.0 | 3.0 | 0.5 | 1.0 | 15.5 |
| Justin Brownlee | 5 | 4 | 31.7 | .446 | .333 | .867 | 5.8 | 4.6 | 1.6 | .6 | 14.2 |
| Dwight Ramos | 8 | 8 | 31.2 | .360 | .167 | .750 | 5.5 | 2.1 | 1.5 | .8 | 13.9 |
| AJ Edu | 8 | 4 | 24.2 | .500 | .000 | .750 | 7.6 | 1.1 | .3 | 1.4 | 6.4 |
| Kevin Quiambao | 8 | 2 | 22.9 | .403 | .279 | .750 | 2.4 | 1.8 | .4 | .3 | 9.4 |
| CJ Perez | 6 | 2 | 20.1 | .392 | .294 | .250 | 2.5 | 1.0 | .5 | .3 | 7.7 |
| Quentin Millora-Brown | 4 | 1 | 19.6 | .619 | .000 | .636 | 8.0 | 1.0 | .5 | .1 | 8.3 |
| Mike Phillips | 2 | 1 | 17.7 | .571 | .000 | .000 | 8.5 | 0 | .1 | .5 | 4 |
| Scottie Thompson | 6 | 4 | 18.2 | .278 | .250 | .455 | 3.0 | 2.7 | 1.5 | 0 | 2.8 |
| Rhon Jhay Abarrientos | 4 | 2 | 15.1 | .176 | .000 | 1.000 | 2.3 | 2.8 | 0 | 0 | 2.8 |
| Juan Gómez de Liaño | 6 | 0 | 14.7 | .444 | .310 | 1.000 | 2.5 | 2.7 | .2 | .2 | 9.3 |
| Carl Tamayo | 7 | 2 | 12.4 | .356 | .353 | .500 | 1.7 | .6 | 0 | 0 | 5.6 |
| Calvin Oftana | 2 | 0 | 12.3 | .286 | .500 | .714 | 3.0 | 1.0 | 0 | 0 | 3.0 |
| June Mar Fajardo | 8 | 4 | 10.8 | .400 | | 1.000 | 3.3 | 1.3 | .1 | .8 | 4.1 |
| Chris Newsome | 8 | 1 | 11.2 | .300 | .333 | 1.000 | 1.0 | 1.4 | .3 | 0 | 2 |
| Japeth Aguilar | 2 | 1 | 8.8 | .500 | | .500 | 2.0 | .5 | 1.0 | .5 | 2.5 |
| Troy Rosario | 2 | 1 | 8.2 | .750 | .000 | | 1.0 | .5 | 0 | 0 | 3 |
| Justine Baltazar | 2 | 0 | 4.1 | .000 | .000 | | .5 | 0 | 0 | .5 | 0 |

== See also ==
- Philippines men's national basketball team
- Philippines men's national basketball team results
  - 2025 Philippines men's national basketball team results
  - 2026 Philippines men's national basketball team results
- 2027 FIBA Basketball World Cup qualification (Asia)
