= 2025 Philippines men's national basketball team results =

- Head coach: Tim Cone; Norman Black (SEA Games only)
- Biggest win: Guam 46–87 Philippines (Mangilao, Guam; November 28)
- Biggest defeat: Egypt 86–55 Philippines (Doha, Qatar; February 16)

The Philippines national basketball team is led by head coach Tim Cone. Cone has been coach since September 2024.

The national team finished their last two remaining games in the qualifiers of the 2025 FIBA Asia Cup which they already qualified for.

They competed at the Doha International Cup in February 2025 in Doha, Qatar.

The Samahang Basketbol ng Pilipinas, the national basketball federation, targets a podium finish for the national team for the 2025 FIBA Asia Cup in Saudi Arabia.

They finished the year by competing at the 2025 SEA Games, where Norman Black served the role of head coach in lieu of Cone. The SEA Games roster underwent at least four revisions.

== Tournaments ==
=== Doha International Cup ===
February 14
20:30 (UTC+3)

Report

Qatar	71–74	Philippines
Scoring by quarter: 20–18, 20–20, 10–13, 21–23
Pts: Harris 17		Pts: Ramos 15; Rebs: Edu 10

Qatar University Sports and Events Complex, Doha

February 15
18:00 (UTC+3)

Report

Lebanon	75–54	Philippines
Scoring by quarter: 13–12, 13–16, 25–20, 24–6
Pts: Hadidian, Khalil 18		Pts: Brownlee 21; Rebs: Brownlee, Thompson 11

Qatar University Sports and Events Complex, Doha

February 16
20:30 (UTC+3)

Report

Egypt	86–55	Philippines
Scoring by quarter: 18–19, 21–9, 18–17, 29–10
Pts: Amin 20		Pts: Brownlee 18

Qatar University Sports and Events Complex, Doha

=== FIBA Asia Cup qualification ===
February 20
19:00 (UTC+8)

Boxscore

Chinese Taipei	91–84	Philippines
Scoring by quarter: 22–20, 25–25, 24–16, 20–23
Pts: Lin T. 21; Rebs: Gilbeck 8 Asts: Lin T. 5		Pts: Brownlee 39; Rebs: Thompson 8 Asts: Brownlee 8

Taipei Heping Basketball Gymnasium, Taipei
Attendance: 3,870
Referees: Takaki Kato (JPN), Budi Marfan (INA), Suebpong Wichaiphin (THA)

February 23
15:00 (UTC+13)

Boxscore

New Zealand	87–70	Philippines
Scoring by quarter: 30–15, 23–18, 21–22, 13–15
Pts: Smith-Milner 25; Rebs: Te Rangi, Smith-Milner 9 Asts: Le'afa 6		Pts: Newsome 13; Rebs: Edu 15; Asts: Brownlee 3

Spark Arena, Auckland
Attendance: 8,345
Referees: James Boyer (AUS), Mohammad Doost (IRN), James Griguol (AUS)

=== FIBA Asia Cup ===
August 5
21:00

Boxscore

Chinese Taipei	95–87	Philippines
Scoring by quarter: 27–16, 16–18, 30–28, 22–25
Pts: Chen Y. 34; Rebs: Gilbeck 9 Asts: Lin 3		Pts: Brownlee 19; Rebs: Edu 12; Asts: Ramos 6

King Abdullah Sports City, Jeddah
Attendance: 3,075
Referees: Rabah Noujaim (LBN), Wissam Zein (SYR), Sadegh Ghanabari (IRI)

August 7
18:00

Boxscore

Philippines	86–94	New Zealand
Scoring by quarter: 18–23, 23–32, 27–19, 18–20
Pts: Brownlee 37; Rebs: Thompson 7 Asts: Newsome, Thompson 4		Pts: Ngatai 22; Rebs: Gold 11; Asts: Britt 8

King Abdullah Sports City, Jeddah
Attendance: 1,005
Referees: Takaki Kato (JPN), Harja Jaladri (INA), Park Kyoung-jin (KOR)

August 9
11:00

Boxscore

Iraq	57–66	Philippines
Scoring by quarter: 18–12, 15–21, 7–22, 17–11
Pts: Hammoodi, Ismael 13; Rebs: Al-Zuhairi 10; Asts: Abdul Allah 5		Pts: Ramos 21; Rebs: three players 7 Asts: Thompson 7

King Abdullah Sports City, Jeddah
Attendance: 1,808
Referees: Yevgeniy Mikheyev (KAZ), Sun Jian (CHN), Preeda Muongmee (THA)

August 11
19:00

Boxscore

Saudi Arabia	88–95 (OT)	Philippines
Scoring by quarter: 15–25, 22–15, 22–20, 20–19, Overtime: 9–16
Pts: Abdur-Rakhman 33; Rebs: Al-Suwailem 14; Asts: Abdel Gabar, Abdur-Rakhman 4		Pts: Brownlee 29; Rebs: Edu 11; Asts: Brownlee 5

King Abdullah Sports City, Jeddah
Attendance: 6,498
Referees: Yevgeniy Mikheyev (KAZ), Wissam Zein (SYR), Preeda Muongmee (THA)

August 13
14:00

Boxscore

Australia	84–60	Philippines
Scoring by quarter: 29–12, 19–16, 21–22, 15–10
Pts: Foxwell, Galloway 15; Rebs: White 8 Asts: Hickey 4		Pts: Quiambao 17; Rebs: Edu 8 Asts: Brownlee 4

King Abdullah Sports City, Jeddah
Attendance: 1,970
Referees: Ahmed Al-Shuwaili (IRQ), Wissam Zein (SYR), Mohammad Taha (JOR)

=== 2027 FIBA Basketball World Cup qualification ===
November 28
19:00

Boxscore

Guam	46–87	Philippines
Scoring by quarter: 17–17, 12–23, 7–24, 10–23
Pts: Cruz 17; Rebs: Galloway 7 Asts: Cruz, Simon 2		Pts: Brownlee 22; Rebs: Fajardo, Millora-Brown 10; Asts: Newsome 5

UOG Calvo Field House, Mangilao
Attendance: 2,364
Referees: Park Kyoung-jin (KOR), Sun Jian (CHN), Lee Kyoung-hwan (KOR)

December 1
19:30

Boxscore

Philippines	95–71	Guam
Scoring by quarter: 32–15, 18–21, 22–19, 23–16
Pts: Brownlee 20; Rebs: Millora-Brown 9 Asts: Brownlee 8		Pts: Cruz 27; Rebs: Galloway 18; Asts: Cruz, Galloway 3

Blue Eagle Gym, Quezon City
Attendance: 3,788
Referees: Takaki Kato (JPN), Zhang Xiao (CHN), Daigo Urushima (JPN)

=== SEA Games ===
December 14
11:30 (UTC+9)

Results
Box Scores

Malaysia	58–83	Philippines
Scoring by quarter: 22−16, 4−26, 25−20, 7−21
Pts: Ting 21; Rebs: Lee S.W. 10; Asts: Yong 4		Pts: Parks 18; Rebs: Ravena 10; Asts: Ravena 10

Nimibutr Stadium, Bangkok
Attendance: 1000
Referees: Zhang Xiao (CHN), Ong Jin Leong (SGP), Nattapong Jontapa (THA)

December 15
11:30 (UTC+9)

Results

Philippines	78–67	Vietnam
Scoring by quarter: 16−21, 21−20, 24−19, 17−7
Pts: Erram 15; Rebs: Malonzo, Parks 8 Asts: Bolick 4		Pts: Tran, H. Nguyen 19; Rebs: Dierker 15; Asts: Tran 4

Nimibutr Stadium, Bangkok
Attendance: 500
Referees: Yuen Chun Yip (HKG), Suebpong Wichaiphin (THA), Nattapong Jontapa (THA)

December 18
14:00 (UTC+9)

Results

Philippines	71–68	Indonesia
Scoring by quarter: 15−27, 18−7, 21−12, 17−22

Nimibutr Stadium, Bangkok

December 19
19:00 (UTC+9)

Results

Philippines	70–64	Thailand
Scoring by quarter: 17−22, 12−16, 23−10, 18−16

Nimibutr Stadium, Bangkok

== Exhibition games ==
July 28
19:30 (UTC+8)

Report

Philippines	103–98	Macau Black Bears
Scoring by quarter: 25–33, 21–30, 33–18, 24–17
Pts: Brownlee 32; Rebs: Brownlee 15		Pts: Douglas 23

Araneta Coliseum, Quezon City

August 2

Report

Jordan	61–75	Philippines

Al Ahli Sports Club, Jeddah

Preceded by 2024	Philippines national basketball team results 2025	Succeeded by 2026
