= 2026 Philippines men's national basketball team results =

- Head coach: Tim Cone
- Biggest win: Kazakhstan 78–109 Philippines (Nagoya, Japan; September 12)
- Biggest defeat: China 105–61 Philippines (Nagoya, Japan; September 14)

The Philippines national basketball team is led by head coach Tim Cone. Cone has been coach since September 2024.

The Philippines continue their participation in the first round of the 2027 FIBA Basketball World Cup qualifiers. They are scheduled to play Australia and New Zealand over the second and third qualifying windows. They qualified for the second round after the conclusion of the second window in March 1.

Prior to the last window in July, the team plans to play tune up games against New Zealand ball clubs.

A separate squad was formed to take part at the 2026 Asian Games in Aichi and Nagoya, Japan in September where the eligibility rules follows a different format from the FIBA standards. The Asian Games team still coached by Cone will play against South Korea twice in September as part of their preparations.

== Tournaments ==
=== 2027 FIBA Basketball World Cup qualification ===
February 26
19:30 (UTC+8)

Boxscore

Philippines	66–69	New Zealand
Scoring by quarter: 21–25, 16–12, 9–20, 20–12
Pts: Ramos 16; Rebs: Edu 11; Asts: Edu, Perez 3		Pts: Darling 11; Rebs: Mennenga 14; Asts: three players 4

SM Mall of Asia Arena, Pasay
Attendance: 12,054
Referees: Sun Jian (CHN), Daigo Urushima (JPN), Park Kyoung-jin (KOR)

March 1
19:30 (UTC+8)

Boxscore

Philippines	66–93	Australia
Scoring by quarter: 13–14, 20–24, 20–30, 13–25
Pts: Brownlee 20; Rebs: Brownlee 8 Asts: Brownlee 7		Pts: Pepper 28; Rebs: Kay 8 Asts: Creek 5

SM Mall of Asia Arena, Pasay
Attendance: 17,301
Referees: Park Kyoung-jin (KOR), Sun Jian (CHN), Yuen Chun Yip (HKG)

July 3
19:00 (UTC+12)

Boxscore

New Zealand	106–102 (OT)	Philippines
Scoring by quarter: 23–17, 21–22, 19–25, 20–19, Overtime: 10–10, 13–9
Pts: Te Rangi 22; Rebs: Waardenburg 10; Asts: Ili 6		Pts: J. Gómez de Liaño, Quiambao 23; Rebs: Brownlee 8 Asts: Abarrientos 10

Spark Arena, Auckland
Attendance: 8,690
Referees: Daigo Urushima (JPN), Chan Owe Shiong (MAS), Chuang Chih-chun (TPE)

July 6
18:30 (UTC+8)

Boxscore

Australia	92–49	Philippines
Scoring by quarter: 33–14, 8–13, 22–10, 29–12
Pts: Cotton 21; Rebs: Bannan 11; Asts: Cotton, Glover 5		Pts: Ramos 9 Rebs: Phillips 12; Asts: Farjado, Ramos 3

Perth Arena, Perth
Attendance: 10,037
Referees: Takaki Kato (JPN), Leung Chuen Wing (SGP), Jiang Wenan (CHN)

August 28
20:30

Boxscore

Jordan	81–82 (OT)	Philippines
Scoring by quarter: 28–14, 16–25, 14–15, 14–18, Overtime: 9–10
Pts: Ibrahim 22; Rebs: Al-Dwairi 10; Asts: Ibrahim 5		Pts: Sotto 18; Rebs: Sotto 14; Asts: Gómez de Liaño 6

SM Mall of Asia Arena, Pasay
Attendance: 12,294
Referees: Rabah Noujaim (LBN), Alexey Stepanenko (KAZ), Chuang Chih-chun (TPE)

August 30
20:00

Boxscore

Philippines	68–56	Iran
Scoring by quarter: 7–18, 29–16, 13–13, 19–9
Pts: Gómez de Liaño, Ramos 16; Rebs: Sotto 16; Asts: Sotto, Thompson 3		Pts: Sheikhi 21; Rebs: three players 7 Asts: Amini 5

SM Mall of Asia Arena, Pasay
Attendance: 18,308
Referees: Rabah Noujaim (LBN), Yevgeniy Mikheyev (KAZ), Alexey Stepanenko (KAZ)

=== Asian Games ===
September 11
13:00 (UTC+9)

Report
Box score

Philippines	85–89	Bahrain
Scoring by quarter: 21–29, 22–20, 18–27, 24–13
Pts: Oftana 31; Rebs: Lucero 9 Asts: Lucero, Nocum 5		Pts: Sampson 24; Rebs: Sampson 13; Asts: Sampson 8

Aichi International Arena, Nagoya
Attendance: 7,557
Referees: Rabah Noujaim (LBN), Mohammad Taha (JOR), Lee Ji-youn (KOR)

September 12
19:00 (UTC+9)

Report
Box Score

Kazakhstan	78–109	Philippines
Scoring by quarter: 15–18, 22–32, 29–32, 12–27
Pts: Bykov 15; Rebs: Bykov 10; Asts: Fedchenko, Rabchenyuk 5		Pts: Ahanmisi 22; Rebs: Bates, Lucero 9 Asts: Barefield 5

Aichi International Arena, Nagoya
Attendance: 8,026
Referees: Mohammad Taha (JOR), Chuang Chih-chun (TPE), Abdullah Al-Hejaili (KSA)

September 14
13:00 (UTC+9)

Report
Box score

China	105–61	Philippines
Scoring by quarter: 36–16, 30–14, 13–10, 26–21
Pts: Wang 20; Rebs: Wang 14; Asts: four players 4		Pts: Oftana 13; Rebs: Lucero 6 Asts: Barefield, Bolick 4

Aichi International Arena, Nagoya
Attendance: 4,307
Referees: Rabah Noujaim (LBN), Wissam Zein (SYR), Nattapong Jontapa (THA)

== Exhibition games ==
June 28

Report

Manawatu Jets (New Zealand)	61–90	Philippines
Scoring by quarter: 12–25, 21–20, 12–22, 16–23
Pts: Evans 11		Pts: Rosario 14

Fly Palmy Arena, Palmerston North

June 30

Report

Franklin Bulls (New Zealand)	66–94	Philippines
Scoring by quarter: 19–32, 18–18, 22–24, 7–20
		Pts: Tamayo 22

Franklin Pool and Leisure Centre, Pukekohe

August 20

Report

Ulsan Hyundai Mobis Phoebus (South Korea)	76–81	Philippines

SMC Sports Complex, Pasig

September 4

Report

South Korea	81–55	Philippines
Scoring by quarter: 24–18, 21–15, 12–11, 24–11
Pts: Lee J. 27; Rebs: Lee H. 15; Asts: Lee J. 5		Pts: Baltazar 15; Rebs: Baltazar 10; Asts: Bolick 5

Suwon KT Sonicboom Arena, Suwon

September 6

Report

South Korea	69–42	Philippines
Scoring by quarter: 19–4, 19–10, 18–13, 13–15
Pts: Yu 15; Rebs: Lee H. 15; Asts: Lee H. 6		Pts: Lucero 14; Rebs: Baltazar 10; Asts: three players 3

Suwon KT Sonicboom Arena, Suwon

Preceded by 2025	Philippines national basketball team results 2026	Succeeded by 2027
