= UAAP Season 87 basketball tournaments =

Basketball season

UAAP Season 87
- "Stronger, Better, Together"
- Host school: University of the Philippines (Collegiate and Junior High School); University of Santo Tomas (Boys' and Girls')
Men's Finals	G1	G2	G3	Wins
De La Salle Green Archers	65	76	62	1
UP Fighting Maroons	73	75	66	2
- Duration: December 8–15, 2024
- Arenas: Araneta Coliseum (Games 1 & 3); SM Mall of Asia Arena (Game 2)
- Finals MVP: JD Cagulangan
- Winning coach: Goldwin Monteverde (2nd title)
- Semifinalists: UST Growling Tigers; Adamson Soaring Falcons
- TV networks: One Sports; UAAP Varsity Channel; Pilipinas Live
Women's Finals	G1	G2	G3	Wins
NU Lady Bulldogs	72	68	78	2
UST Growling Tigresses	71	78	73	1
- Duration: December 8–15, 2024
- Arenas: Araneta Coliseum (Games 1 & 3); SM Mall of Asia Arena (Game 2)
- Finals MVP: Cielo Pagdulagan
- Winning coach: Aris Dimaunahan (2nd title)
- Semifinalists: Adamson Lady Falcons; Ateneo Blue Eagles
- TV networks: One Sports; UAAP Varsity Channel; Pilipinas Live
Boys' Finals	G1	G2	G3 (OT)	Wins
NUNS Bullpups	77	85	77	1
UST Tiger Cubs	70	89	83	2
- Duration: March 13–27, 2025
- Arena: Filoil EcoOil Centre
- Finals MVP: Racine Kane
- Winning coach: Manu Iñigo (2nd title, 1st UAAP)
- Semifinalists: FEU–D Baby Tamaraws; Adamson Baby Falcons
- TV network: UAAP Varsity Channel
Girls' Finals	G1	G2	Wins
UST Junior Tigresses	85	63	2
NUNS Lady Bullpups	57	57	0
- Duration: March 13–20, 2025
- Arena: Filoil EcoOil Centre
- Finals MVP: Barby Dajao
- Winning coach: Arsenio Dysangco (1st title)
- TV network: UAAP Varsity Channel
JHS Finals	G1	G2	G3	Wins
UE Junior Red Warriors	84	76	78	2
UST Tiger Cubs	98	70	47	1
- Duration: December 11–20, 2024
- Arenas: SM Mall of Asia Arena (Game 1); Araneta Coliseum (Game 2); Filoil EcoOil Centre (Game 3)
- Finals MVP: Gab Delos Reyes
- Winning coach: Andrew Estrella (1st title)
- Semifinalists: FEU–D Baby Tamaraws; NUNS Bullpups
- TV network: UAAP Varsity Channel

The UAAP Season 87 basketball tournaments were the University Athletic Association of the Philippines (UAAP) basketball tournaments for the 2024–25 school year. University of the Philippines Diliman were the hosts.

In the elimination round of the men's tournament, the De La Salle Green Archers finished first, with the UP Fighting Maroons second. The UST Growling Tigers finished third, while the Adamson Soaring Falcons eliminated the UE Red Warriors in the 4th seed playoff. Both UP and La Salle won the semifinals match-ups over Adamson and UST, respectively, marking their second overall head-to-head UAAP Finals matchup. For the fourth consecutive season, the men's basketball finals series reached a do-or-die third game - the longest such streak so far for the tournament in UAAP Final Four history. UP defeated La Salle to win their 4th men's championship.

In the women's tournament, the NU Lady Bulldogs advanced to the finals outright after winning all elimination round games. The Adamson Lady Falcons defeated the Ateneo Blue Eagles in the first round of the stepladder. UST defeated Adamson on the next round, setting up a rematch from last year's finals with NU. The series lasted three full games, with NU defeating UST to win their 8th women's championship.

In the junior high school tournament, the UE Junior Warriors finished first, followed by the FEU Diliman Baby Tamaraws; they have the twice-to-beat advantage against the NUNS Bullpups and the UST Tiger Cubs, respectively. While UE defeated NUNS, UST upset FEU Diliman in the semifinals. The Junior Warriors then defeated the Tiger Cubs to win the first junior high school championship, and first basketball championship for UE since 1985.

In the boys' tournament, the UST Tiger Cubs won the title against the NUNS Bullpups. The Bullpups finished first and had won the first 13 elimination round games, but lost the last game against UST, who had then finished second. NUNS and UST defeated Adamson and FEU Diliman respectively in the semifinals, then split the first two games in the finals. The Tiger Cubs won the deciding game in overtime.

The UST Junior Tigresses finished undefeated in the girls' tournament, and faced the second seeded NUNS Lady Bullpups. UST won the championship undefeated.

== Tournament format ==
The UAAP continued to use the UAAP Final Four format.

The UAAP held championships in the college division and the junior high school tournament on the first semester of the academic year, while the boys' and girls' championships were held in the second semester.

Xavy Nunag was named basketball commissioner for the third consecutive year. Assisting him are his deputies Mariana Lopa and Marvin Bienvenida who will supervise the women’s and high school basketball tournaments, respectively. The UAAP also announced the return of the girls' tournament, last played in 2020.

Teams customarily assigned to wear light jerseys during certain games would be allowed to wear dark uniforms instead as long as Commissioner's Office permits. This privilege was not exercised last Season 86 when this change was introduced. The Green Archers is set to be the first team to take advantage of the new rule in their scheduled opening game against Ateneo.

== Teams ==
Basketball is a mandatory event in the UAAP, where all 8 universities are required to field in teams in the men's tournament.

The girls' tournament is a demonstration sport last held in UAAP Season 82 (2020), and is not mandatory.

Collegiate division
University	Men		Women		Uniform manufacturer
University	Team	Coach	Team	Coach	Uniform manufacturer
Adamson University (AdU)	Soaring Falcons	(Philippines) Nash Racela	Lady Falcons	(Philippines) Ryan Monteclaro	Anta
Ateneo de Manila University (ADMU (Note: Since 2017, Ateneo de Manila University is the only member school that does not use an acronym for official communications and graphics, according to their branding guide.))	Blue Eagles	(United States) Tab Baldwin	Blue Eagles	(Philippines) LA Mumar	Jordan Brand
De La Salle University (DLSU)	Green Archers	(Philippines) Topex Robinson	Lady Archers	(Philippines) Pocholo Villanueva	Nike
Far Eastern University (FEU)	Tamaraws	(United States) Sean Chambers	Lady Tamaraws	(Philippines) Raiza Palmera-Dy	Puma
National University (NU)	Bulldogs	(Philippines) Jeff Napa	Lady Bulldogs	(Philippines) Aries Dimaunahan	Adidas
University of the East (UE)	Red Warriors	(Philippines) Jack Santiago	Lady Warriors	(Philippines) Aileen Lebornio	Anta
University of the Philippines (UP)	Fighting Maroons	(Philippines) Goldwin Monteverde	Fighting Maroons	(Philippines) Paul Ramos	STATS (Men's); Titan 22 (Women's)
University of Santo Tomas (UST)	Growling Tigers	(Philippines) Pido Jarencio	Tigresses	(Philippines) Haydee Ong	Delta Sportswear

High school division
High schools	Boys'/junior high school			Girls	
High schools	Team	Boys' coach	JHS coach	Team	Coach
Adamson University (AdU)	Baby Falcons	(Philippines) Mike Fermin	(Philippines) Alex Barerra	—N/a	
Ateneo de Manila University High School (ADMU)	Blue Eagles	(Philippines) Reggie Varilla	(Philippines) Ford Arao	Blue Eagles	(Philippines) PJ Navarro
De La Salle Santiago Zobel School (DLSZ)	Junior Archers	(Philippines) Boris Aldeguer	(Philippines) Penny Laureaga	Junior Lady Archers	(Philippines) Louie Fernandez
Far Eastern University Diliman (FEU-D)	Baby Tamaraws	(Philippines) Allan Albano		—N/a	
National University Nazareth School (NUNS)	Bullpups	(Philippines) Kevin De Castro		Lady Bullpups	(Philippines) Camilla Escoto
University of the East (UE)	Junior Warriors	(Philippines) Karl Santos	(Philippines) Andrew Estrella	—N/a	
University of the Philippines Integrated School (UPIS)	Junior Fighting Maroons	(Philippines) King Vergeire		—N/a	
University of Santo Tomas Senior High School (UST)	Tiger Cubs	(Philippines) Manu Iñigo	(Philippines) Noli Mejos	Junior Tigresses	(Philippines) Arsenio Dysangco

=== Coaching changes ===
Team	Outgoing coach	Manner of departure	Date	Replaced by	Date
FEU Lady Tamaraws	(Philippines) Bert Flores	Fired	February 29, 2024	(Philippines) Raiza Palmera-Dy	February 29, 2024
FEU Tamaraws	(Philippines) Denok Miranda	Promoted as head of basketball programs	March 19, 2024	(United States) Sean Chambers	March 19, 2024

== Venues ==
Venues in Metro Manila

The opening ceremonies and opening day men's doubleheader shall be held at Araneta Coliseum. Subsequent men's, women's and junior high school first round games are scheduled to be held there, and in the SM Mall of Asia Arena, mostly in sextupleheaders. In game days where only the men's teams are to play in either arena, the women's and junior high school games are held in the Adamson University gym on the same day.

For the second round, there are 5 games per day held in one venue, with the Filoil EcoOil Centre and the Quadricentennial Pavilion hosting games. The affected women's and junior high school games will be done after the men's elimination round concludes, and will be held at the Filoil EcoOil Centre. This was done to have earlier start times for men's games. For the postponed games due to Tropical Storm Kristine (Trami), it was included in the games that will be held at the Filoil EcoOil Centre.

For senior high school basketball, all first round games were held at the Filoil EcoOil Centre.

Arena	Location	Tournament					Capacity
Arena	Location	M	W	B	G	JHS	Capacity
Araneta Coliseum	Quezon City	check	check			check	14,429
Filoil EcoOil Centre	San Juan	check	check	check	check	check	6,000
Quadricentennial Pavilion (UST Gym)	Manila	check	check			check	5,792
SM Mall of Asia Arena	Pasay	check	check			check	15,000
St. Vincent Gym (Adamson Gym)	Manila		check			check	

== Squads ==
Each team has a 16-player roster. Only one "foreign student-athlete", non-Filipinos who are otherwise known as "imports" elsewhere, is allowed to be on the active roster.

Men's team rosters
Adamson	Ateneo	La Salle	FEU	NU	UE	UP	UST
(Philippines) Carl Alexander	(Philippines) Mike Asoro	(Philippines) Earl Abadam	(Philippines) Royce Alforque	(Philippines) Edmund Dela Cruz	(Philippines) John Abate	(Philippines) Gerry Abadiano	(Philippines) Amiel Acido
(Philippines) Matthew Anabo	(Philippines) Jared Bahay	(Nigeria) Henry Agunanne	(Philippines) Chiolo Anonuevo	(Mali) Mohamed Diassana	(Philippines) Hunter Cruz-Dumont	(Philippines) Harold Alarcon	(Philippines) Nic Cabanero
(Philippines) Joshua Barcelona	(Nigeria) Ayodeji Balogun	(Philippines) Ethan Alian	(Philippines) Aeron Bagunu	(Philippines) Steve Nash Enriquez	(Philippines) Jack Cruz-Dumont	(Philippines) Sean Alter	(Philippines) Ivanne Calum
(Philippines) Mario Barasi Jr	(Philippines) Andrew Bongo	(Philippines) CJ Austria	(Philippines) Jorick Bautista	(Philippines) Jake Figueroa	(Philippines) Devin Fikes	(Philippines) Jacob Bayla	(Philippines) Gelo Crisostomo
(Philippines) John Arthur Calisay	(Philippines) Adam Roy Dela Cruz	(Philippines) Vincent Joshua David	(Philippines) Jedric Daa	(Philippines) Paul John Francisco	(Philippines) Romo Finney	(Philippines) Mark Belmonte	(Philippines) Glenn Isaac Danting
(Philippines) Flever Dignadice	(Philippines) Femi Edu	(Philippines) David Andrei Dungo	(Philippines) Nicholas Duque	(Philippines) Tebol Garcia	(Philippines) Ethan Galang	(Philippines) Chicco Briones	(Philippines) Leeland Estacio
(Philippines) Matt Erolon	(Philippines) Waki Espina	(Philippines) EJ Gollena	(The Gambia) Mohamed Konateh	(Philippines) Reinhard Jumamoy	(Philippines) Ronjie Go	(Philippines) JD Cagulangan	(Philippines) Echo Laure
(Philippines) Anthony Fransman	(Philippines) Ian Espinosa	(Philippines) Raven Gonzales	(Philippines) Jayden Jones	(Philippines) Donn Spencer Lim	(Philippines) Johndrew Jimenez	(Philippines) Janjan Felicilda	(Philippines) Chase Lane
(Philippines) Allen Ignacio	(Philippines) Kyle Daven Gamber	(Philippines) Alex Konov	(Philippines) Rojan Montemayor	(Philippines) Ian Jolo Manansala	(Philippines) Wello Lingolingo	(Philippines) Terrence Fortea	(Philippines) Mark Llemit
(Philippines) Royca Mantua	(Philippines) Chris Koon	(Philippines) JC Macalalag	(Philippines) Janrey Pasaol	(Philippines) Kenshin Padrones	(Philippines) Rainer Maga	(Philippines) Francis Lopez	(Philippines) Zain Mahmood
(Philippines) Cedrick Manzano	(Philippines) Joshua Lazaro	(Philippines) Vhoris Marasigan	(Philippines) Adam Nakai	(Philippines) PJ Palacielo	(Philippines) Reynaldo Malaga III	(Philippines) Quentin Millora-Brown	(Philippines) Christian Manaytay
(Philippines) Mathew Montebon	(Philippines) Kyle Ong	(Philippines) Isaiah Phillips	(Philippines) Miguel Ona	(Philippines) Bobby Mark Parks	(Nigeria) Precious Momowei	(Philippines) Gani Stevens	(Philippines) Forthsky Padrigao
(Nigeria) Mudiaga Ojarikre	(Philippines) Kristian Porter	(Philippines) Mike Phillips	(Philippines) Veejay Pre	(Philippines) Kurt Perciano	(Philippines) Nico Mulingtapang	(Philippines) Sean Aldous Torculas	(Philippines) Miguel Pangilinan
(Philippines) Eli Ramos	(Philippines) Sean Quitevis	(Philippines) Kevin Quiambao		(Philippines) Gelo Santiago	(Philippines) DJ Robles	(Philippines) Reyland Torres	(Philippines) Kyle Paranada
(Philippines) Austin Ronzone	(Philippines) Marc Samuel Reyes	(Philippines) Lian Ramiro		(Philippines) Nathaniel Tulabut	(Philippines) Keian Spandonis	(Nigeria) Dikachi Ududo	(Philippines) Geremy Robinson
(Philippines) Joshua Yerro	(Philippines) Shawn Tuano	(Philippines) Matt Rubico		(Philippines) Patrick Wilson Yu	(Philippines) Gjerard Wilson	(Philippines) Denzil Walker	(Mali) Mo Tounkara

== Men's tournament ==
The men's tournament started on September 7, 2024, featuring a Battle of Katipunan game between the Ateneo Blue Eagles and the UP Fighting Maroons in the Araneta Coliseum.

=== Elimination round ===
Due to the University of Santo Tomas Entrance Test being held on the same day, the UAAP postponed the October 20 games hosted by the Quadricentennial Pavilion to November 3.

The UAAP postponed the October 23 games due to inclement weather caused by Tropical Storm Kristine (Trami). The postponed games were rescheduled to November 20 and 23.

==== Team standings ====
Pos	Team	W	L	PCT	GB	Qualification
1	De La Salle Green Archers	12	2	.857	—	Twice-to-beat in the semifinals
2	UP Fighting Maroons (H)	11	3	.786	1	Twice-to-beat in the semifinals
3	UST Growling Tigers	7	7	.500	5	Twice-to-win in the semifinals
4	Adamson Soaring Falcons	6	8	.429 (Note: Fourth seed playoff: Adamson 68–55 UE)	6	Twice-to-win in the semifinals
5	UE Red Warriors	6	8	.429	6	
6	FEU Tamaraws	5	9	.357 (Note: Head-to-head record: FEU 1–1 (+5) NU)	7	
7	NU Bulldogs	5	9	.357	7	
8	Ateneo Blue Eagles	4	10	.286	8	

Source: UAAP on Livestats
(H) Hosts

==== Match-up results ====
	Round 1							Round 2						
Team ╲ Game	1	2	3	4	5	6	7	8	9	10	11	12	13	14
Adamson	FEU school colors	La Salle school colors	UST school colors	Ateneo school colors	NU school colors	UP school colors	UE school colors	FEU school colors	La Salle school colors	UP school colors	UE school colors	NU school colors	UST school colors	Ateneo school colors
Ateneo	UP school colors	UST school colors	La Salle school colors	Adamson school colors	FEU school colors	UE school colors	NU school colors	NU school colors	UST school colors	La Salle school colors	UP school colors	FEU school colors	UE school colors	Adamson school colors
La Salle	NU school colors	Adamson school colors	Ateneo school colors	UE school colors	FEU school colors	UST school colors	UP school colors	UE school colors	UST school colors	Adamson school colors	Ateneo school colors	FEU school colors	UP school colors	NU school colors
FEU	Adamson school colors	NU school colors	UE school colors	UP school colors	La Salle school colors	Ateneo school colors	UST school colors	Adamson school colors	NU school colors	UST school colors	UE school colors	La Salle school colors	Ateneo school colors	UP school colors
NU	La Salle school colors	FEU school colors	UP school colors	UST school colors	Adamson school colors	UE school colors	Ateneo school colors	Ateneo school colors	FEU school colors	UE school colors	UP school colors	UST school colors	Adamson school colors	La Salle school colors
UE	UST school colors	UP school colors	FEU school colors	La Salle school colors	NU school colors	Ateneo school colors	Adamson school colors	La Salle school colors	NU school colors	Adamson school colors	FEU school colors	UST school colors	Ateneo school colors	UP school colors
UP	Ateneo school colors	UE school colors	NU school colors	FEU school colors	Adamson school colors	UST school colors	La Salle school colors	UST school colors	Adamson school colors	Ateneo school colors	NU school colors	La Salle school colors	FEU school colors	UE school colors
UST	UE school colors	Ateneo school colors	Adamson school colors	NU school colors	La Salle school colors	UP school colors	FEU school colors	UP school colors	La Salle school colors	Ateneo school colors	FEU school colors	NU school colors	UE school colors	Adamson school colors

Source: UAAP on Livestats
= Win; = OT win; = Loss; = OT loss

==== Scores ====
Results on top and to the right of the grey cells are for first-round games; those to the bottom and to the left of it are second-round games.

Teams	AdU	ADMU	DLSU	FEU	NU	UE	UP	UST
Adamson Soaring Falcons		51–60	52–82	59–47	60–58	62–63	57–69	69–56
Ateneo Blue Eagles	55–69		61–74	65–66*	68–78	62–69	61–77	64–74
De La Salle Green Archers	70–45	80–65		68–62	78–75	71–75	68–56	88–67
FEU Tamaraws	76–72*	65–54	53–58		60–62	51–56	58–69	72–83
NU Bulldogs	41–53	68–70	63–54	58–65		51–57	62–89	64–67
UE Red Warriors	37–45	67–71	68–77	51–59	74–58		71–81	55–70
UP Fighting Maroons	70–59	75–47	66–77	86–78	47–67	77–67		81–70
UST Growling Tigers	75–49	64–67	87–94*	79–70	62–67	76–67	73–83	

Source: UAAP on Livestats
Legend: Blue = left column team win; Red = top row team win.
Matches with lighter background shading were decided after overtime.

=== Fourth seed playoff ===
Adamson and UE finished the elimination round tied for fourth. This is a one-game playoff to determine the #4 seed. This is Adamson's third consecutive fourth seed playoff.

One Sports, UAAP Varsity Channel

November 27, 2024
6:30 p.m.

Adamson Soaring Falcons	68–55	UE Red Warriors
Scoring by quarter: 16–10, 23–20, 13–10, 16–15
Pts: Cedrick Manzano 17; Rebs: Cedrick Manzano 10; Asts: Mathew Montebon 6		Pts: Jack Cruz-Dumont 15; Rebs: Precious Momowei 11; Asts: Jack Cruz-Dumont 4
Adamson advances to the Final Four

SM Mall of Asia Arena, Pasay
Referees: Molly de Luna, Juner Bayais, Jaime Jimenez

=== Bracket ===
Semifinals (Top 2 twice-to-beat)
1	La Salle	70
4	Adamson	55
2	UP	78
3	UST	69

Finals (Best-of-three playoff)
1	La Salle	65	76	62
2	UP	73	75	66

=== Semifinals ===
The top two seeded teams after the elimination round have the twice-to-beat advantage in the semifinals, where they have to be beaten twice, while their opponents only once, to progress.

==== (1) La Salle vs. (4) Adamson ====
La Salle became the first team to clinch a semifinals berth with their win against Adamson. La Salle then clinched the twice-to-beat advantage with FEU's win over UE. The Green Archers then locked the #1 seed in a win against UP. Adamson clinched the #4 seed after winning their fourth seed playoff against UE. These two teams last met in the semis in 2017 where La Salle won in one game.

One Sports, UAAP Varsity Channel

November 30, 2024
6:30 p.m.

De La Salle Green Archers	70–55	Adamson Soaring Falcons
Scoring by quarter: 18–11, 18–6, 23–17, 11–21
Pts: Kevin Quiambao 14; Rebs: Raven Gonzales 9 Asts: Mike Phillips 4		Pts: Royce Mantua 14; Rebs: Mudiaga Ojarikre 11; Asts: Mathew Montebon 3
La Salle wins series in one game

Araneta Coliseum, Quezon City
Referees: Edgar Orpilla, Oliver Angeles, Jhoden Nebres

==== (2) UP vs. (3) UST ====
UP was the second team to clinch a semifinals berth, their sixth consecutive, after a win against Adamson. They then settled on the #2 seed and the twice-to-beat advantage that comes with it, on their loss against La Salle. UST clinched the #3 seed and its first Final Four appearance since 2019 after their win against Adamson. The match-up is a rematch of the 2019 series where lower-seeded UST won in two games.

One Sports, UAAP Varsity Channel

November 30, 2024
3:30 p.m.

UP Fighting Maroons	78–69	UST Growling Tigers
Scoring by quarter: 16–14, 17–21, 24–15, 21–19
Pts: Lopez, Alarcon, 16; Rebs: Quentin Millora-Brown 19; Asts: JD Cagulangan 5		Pts: 3 players, 12; Rebs: Manaytay, Tounkara, 8 Asts: Kyle Paranada 4
UP wins series in one game

Araneta Coliseum, Quezon City
Referees: Molly de Luna, Ace Sison, Dave Jaramillo

=== Finals ===
The finals is a best-of-three playoff. The UP Fighting Maroons advances to its fourth consecutive finals, while the De La Salle Green Archers clinched their second consecutive finals berth. This is a rematch of the UAAP Season 86 finals where La Salle won.

Game 3 was originally scheduled on December 14 at the Araneta Coliseum, coincidentally on the same day and venue as Game 3 (if necessary) of NCAA Season 100. The UAAP then rescheduled Game 3 to December 15.

One Sports, UAAP Varsity Channel

December 8, 2024
5:30 p.m.

De La Salle Green Archers	65–73	UP Fighting Maroons
Scoring by quarter: 18–11, 23–26, 9–17, 15–19
Pts: Kevin Quiambao 19; Rebs: Quiambao, Phillips 11; Asts: Mike Phillips 5		Pts: Quentin Millora-Brown 17; Rebs: Quentin Millora-Brown 9 Asts: JD Cagulangan 5

Araneta Coliseum, Quezon City
Referees: Ian Borbe, Juner Bayais, Edgar Orpilla

One Sports, UAAP Varsity Channel

December 11, 2024
5:30 p.m.

De La Salle Green Archers	76–75	UP Fighting Maroons
Scoring by quarter: 28–22, 11–14, 15–26, 22–13
Pts: Kevin Quiambao 22; Rebs: Mike Phillips 12; Asts: Quiambao, Austria, 4		Pts: 3 players, 16 each Rebs: Francis Lopez 9 Asts: JD Cagulangan 5

SM Mall of Asia Arena, Pasay
Attendance: 17,112
Referees: Edgar Orpilla, Juner Bayais, Jaime Rivano

One Sports, UAAP Varsity Channel

December 15, 2024
5:30 p.m.

De La Salle Green Archers	62–66	UP Fighting Maroons
Scoring by quarter: 21–21, 15–21, 14–14, 12–10
Pts: Mike Phillips 18; Rebs: Mike Phillips 12; Asts: Joshua David 4		Pts: Quentin Millora-Brown 14; Rebs: Francis Lopez 11; Asts: Francis Lopez 6
UP wins series, 2–1

Araneta Coliseum, Quezon City
Attendance: 25,248
Referees: Ian Borbe, Edgar Orpilla, Dave Jaramillo

- Finals Most Valuable Player: JD Cagulangan (UP Fighting Maroons)

=== Awards ===
UAAP Season 87 men's basketball champions
UP Fighting Maroons
Fourth title

The award winners were announced prior to game 2 of the finals, at the SM Mall of Asia Arena.

- Most Valuable Player: Kevin Quiambao (De La Salle Green Archers)
- Rookie of the Year: Veejay Pre (FEU Tamaraws)
- Mythical Five:
  - Kevin Quiambao (De La Salle Green Archers)
  - Mike Phillips (De La Salle Green Archers)
  - JD Cagulangan (UP Fighting Maroons)
  - Mo Konateh (FEU Tamaraws)
  - Nic Cabanero (UST Growling Tigers)

==== Player of the Week ====
The Collegiate Press Corps names a player of the week throughout the season.

Week	Player	Team
September 7–15	(Philippines) Kevin Quiambao	De La Salle Green Archers
September 18–22	(Philippines) John Abate	UE Red Warriors
September 25–29	(Philippines) Mike Phillips	De La Salle Green Archers
October 2–6	(Philippines) Wello Lingolingo	UE Red Warriors
October 12–19	(Philippines) Jorick Bautista	FEU Tamaraws
October 26–30	(Philippines) Kevin Quiambao	De La Salle Green Archers
November 13–23	(Philippines) Amiel Acido	UST Growling Tigers

=== Statistical leaders ===
La Salle's Kevin Quiambao emerged as the top player in the statistical points race, the basis of determining the individual awards including most valuable player. Quiambao was also the scoring champion.

==== Statistical points leaders ====
#	Player	Team	SP
1	(Philippines) Kevin Quiambao	De La Salle Green Archers	81.357
2	(Philippines) Mike Philips	De La Salle Green Archers	74.929
3	(Philippines) JD Cagulangan	UP Fighting Maroons	69.167
4	(The Gambia) Mohamed Konateh	FEU Tamaraws	68.643
5	(Nigeria) Precious Momowei	UE Red Warriors	67.538

==== Season player highs ====
Statistic	Player	Team	Average
Points per game	(Philippines) Kevin Quiambao	De La Salle Green Archers	16.64
Rebounds per game	(The Gambia) Mohamed Konateh	FEU Tamaraws	16.71
Assists per game	(Philippines) Forthsky Padrigao	UST Growling Tigers	6.07
Steals per game	(Philippines) JD Cagulangan	UP Fighting Maroons	1.75
Blocks per game	(The Gambia) Mohamed Konateh	FEU Tamaraws	2.35
Field goal percentage	(Philippines) Shawn Tuano	Ateneo Blue Eagles	47.32%
Three-point field goal percentage	(Philippines) Kyle Paranada	UST Growling Tigers	42.86%
Free throw percentage	(Philippines) Jorick Bautista	FEU Tamaraws	82.86%
Turnovers per game	(Nigeria) Precious Momowei	UE Red Warriors	4.38

==== Game player highs ====
Statistic	Player	Team	Total	Opponent
Points	(Philippines) Kevin Quiambao	De La Salle Green Archers	33	Ateneo Blue Eagles
Points	(Philippines) Harold Alarcon	UP Fighting Maroons	33	UE Red Warriors
Rebounds	(The Gambia) Mohamed Konateh	FEU Tamaraws	27	De La Salle Green Archers
Assists	(Philippines) Forthsky Padrigao	UST Growling Tigers	11	FEU Tamaraws
Steals	(Philippines) Mike Philips	De La Salle Green Archers	5	FEU Tamaraws
Steals	(Philippines) Mike Philips	De La Salle Green Archers	5	UE Red Warriors
Blocks	(Nigeria) Mudiaga Ojarikre	Adamson Soaring Falcons	7	UE Red Warriors
Turnovers	(Philippines) JD Cagulangan	UP Fighting Maroons	9	NU Bulldogs
Turnovers	(Nigeria) Precious Momowei	UE Red Warriors	9	Adamson Soaring Falcons

==== Season team highs ====
Category	Team	Average
Points per game	De La Salle Green Archers	74.21
Rebounds per game	De La Salle Green Archers	49.86
Assists per game	De La Salle Green Archers	20.79
Steals per game	UP Fighting Maroons	7.86
Blocks per game	FEU Tamaraws	4.07
Field goal percentage	UP Fighting Maroons	41.14%
Three point field goal percentage	De La Salle Green Archers	30.27%
Free throw percentage	FEU Tamaraws	68.92%
Turnovers per game	De La Salle Green Archers	19.43

==== Game team highs ====
Statistic	Team	Total	Opponent
Points	De La Salle Green Archers	94 (Note: Game went into overtime)	UST Growling Tigers
Points	UP Fighting Maroons	89	NU Bulldogs
Rebounds	De La Salle Green Archers	62	Ateneo Blue Eagles
Assists	De La Salle Green Archers	27	Adamson Soaring Falcons
Steals	UST Growling Tigers	15	De La Salle Green Archers
Steals	UE Red Warriors	13	De La Salle Green Archers
Blocks	Adamson Soaring Falcons	9	FEU Tamaraws
Field goal percentage	UP Fighting Maroons	54.0%	UST Growling Tigers
Three-point field goal percentage	Adamson Soaring Falcons	52.0%	FEU Tamaraws
Free throw percentage	Adamson Soaring Falcons	100%	NU Bulldogs
Turnovers	UP Fighting Maroons	30	NU Bulldogs

=== Discipline ===
The following were disciplined throughout the course of the season:

- Coach Topex Robinson of the De La Salle Green Archers for "responded with language unbecoming of a coach", and Reyland Torres of the UP FIghting Maroons, for passing "in very close proximity to Coach Robinson twice", in their first round game against each other; both were given stern warnings by the UAAP. Torres accused Robinson of spitting on him, while La Salle accused Torres of using profane language, but evidence for both were inconclusive.
- Mo Tounkara of the UST Growling Tigers for being called for two technical fouls in their game against the De La Salle Green Archers; Tounkara served a one-game suspension against the Ateneo Blue Eagles.
- Precious Momowei of the UE Red Warriors, for being called for two unsportsmanlike fouls in their game against the UST Growling Tigers. Momowei served a one-game suspension against the Ateneo Blue Eagles.

== Women's tournament ==
The women's tournament started on September 8, 2024 at the Araneta Coliseum, with defending champions UST winning against UE.

=== Elimination round ===
The UE Lady Warriors ended their 40-game losing streak stretching back to UAAP Season 82 (2019) in their first round win against La Salle.

==== Team standings ====
Pos	Team	W	L	PCT	GB	Qualification
1	NU Lady Bulldogs	14	0	1.000	—	Advance to the Finals (Note: As NU won all of their elimination round games, the stepladder format was used instead of the regular Final Four format.)
2	UST Growling Tigresses	12	2	.857	2	Advance to stepladder round 2
3	Adamson Lady Falcons	9	5	.643	5	Proceed to stepladder round 1
4	Ateneo Blue Eagles	8	6	.571	6	Proceed to stepladder round 1
5	UP Fighting Maroons (H)	5	9	.357	9	
6	De La Salle Lady Archers	4	10	.286	10	
7	FEU Lady Tamaraws	3	11	.214	11	
8	UE Lady Warriors	1	13	.071	13	

(H) Hosts

==== Match-up results ====
	Round 1							Round 2						
Team ╲ Game	1	2	3	4	5	6	7	8	9	10	11	12	13	14
Adamson	FEU school colors	La Salle school colors	UST school colors	Ateneo school colors	NU school colors	UP school colors	UE school colors	FEU school colors	La Salle school colors	UP school colors	UE school colors	NU school colors	UST school colors	Ateneo school colors
Ateneo	UP school colors	UST school colors	La Salle school colors	Adamson school colors	FEU school colors	UE school colors	NU school colors	NU school colors	UST school colors	La Salle school colors	UP school colors	FEU school colors	UE school colors	Adamson school colors
La Salle	NU school colors	Adamson school colors	Ateneo school colors	UE school colors	FEU school colors	UST school colors	UP school colors	UE school colors	Adamson school colors	Ateneo school colors	FEU school colors	UP school colors	NU school colors	UST school colors
FEU	Adamson school colors	NU school colors	UE school colors	UP school colors	La Salle school colors	Ateneo school colors	UST school colors	Adamson school colors	UST school colors	UE school colors	La Salle school colors	Ateneo school colors	UP school colors	NU school colors
NU	La Salle school colors	FEU school colors	UP school colors	UST school colors	Adamson school colors	UE school colors	Ateneo school colors	Ateneo school colors	UE school colors	UP school colors	UST school colors	Adamson school colors	La Salle school colors	FEU school colors
UE	UST school colors	UP school colors	FEU school colors	La Salle school colors	NU school colors	Ateneo school colors	Adamson school colors	La Salle school colors	NU school colors	Adamson school colors	FEU school colors	UST school colors	Ateneo school colors	UP school colors
UP	Ateneo school colors	UE school colors	NU school colors	FEU school colors	Adamson school colors	UST school colors	La Salle school colors	UST school colors	Adamson school colors	Ateneo school colors	NU school colors	La Salle school colors	FEU school colors	UE school colors
UST	UE school colors	Ateneo school colors	Adamson school colors	NU school colors	La Salle school colors	UP school colors	FEU school colors	UP school colors	Ateneo school colors	FEU school colors	NU school colors	UE school colors	Adamson school colors	La Salle school colors

= Win; = OT win; = Loss; = OT loss

==== Scores ====
Results on top and to the right of the grey cells are for first-round games; those to the bottom and to the left of it are second-round games.

Teams	AdU	ADMU	DLSU	FEU	NU	UE	UP	UST
Adamson Lady Falcons		77–72	65–54	76–63	52–74	63–51	60–56	55–58
Ateneo Blue Eagles	52–58		65–62	69–53	58–66	90–62	79–68	54–77
De La Salle Lady Archers	49–72	57–70		89–65	49–64	47–65	62–66	68–76
FEU Lady Tamaraws	67–64	70–85	60–64		64–91	62–56	77–82	57–66
NU Lady Bulldogs	72–53	82–62	72–63	86–58		67–39	76–64	75–69
UE Lady Warriors	48–66	54–64	46–74	51–57	48–103		43–67	44–86
UP Fighting Maroons	54–57	66–75	62–69	76–61	59–64	65–48		60–84
UST Tigresses	60–47	77–73	70–52	70–54	70–76	84–62	84–57	

Source: UAAP on Livestats
Legend: Blue = left column team win; Red = top row team win.
Matches with lighter background shading were decided after overtime.

=== Bracket ===
Stepladder round 1 (Single-elimination)
3	Adamson	59*
4	Ateneo	53

Stepladder round 2 (Single-elimination)
2	UST	71
3	Adamson	59

Finals (Best-of-three playoff)
1	NU	72	68	78
2	UST	71	78	73

*Overtime

=== Stepladder semifinals ===
After winning their first 12 games, the NU Lady Bulldogs clinched the top seed. UST, Adamson, and Ateneo round-up the teams that qualified to the playoffs. As the NU Lady Bulldogs won all elimination round games, received a bye up to the finals, with the next three teams figuring in a stepladder single-elimination tournament.

==== (3) Adamson vs. (4) Ateneo ====
Adamson and Ateneo will face in the first round of the stepladder.

One Sports, UAAP Varsity Channel

November 30, 2024
12:00 p.m.

Adamson Lady Falcons	59–53 (OT)	Ateneo Blue Eagles
Scoring by quarter: 13–14, 10–11, 17–9, 9–15, Overtime: 10–4
Pts: Elaine Etang 22; Rebs: Cheska Apag 10; Asts: Jam Meniano 3		Pts: Kacey Dela Rosa 19; Rebs: Kacey Dela Rosa 24; Asts: Kailah Oani 4
Adamson advances to the stepladder round 2

Araneta Coliseum, Quezon City
Referees: John Cabiles, Garchee Ferrer, Irish Sano-an

==== (2) UST vs. (3) Adamson ====
UST finished the elimination round at second and will await the winner of the first round.

One Sports, UAAP Varsity Channel

December 4, 2024
3:00 p.m.

UST Growling Tigresses	71–59	Adamson Lady Falcons
Scoring by quarter: 21–12, 14–25, 21–11, 15–11
Pts: Kent Pastrana 23; Rebs: Kent Pastrana 16; Asts: Kent Pastrana 8		Pts: Etang, Adeshina, 12; Rebs: Oluwakemi Adeshina 8 Asts: Etang, Limbago, 2
UST advances to the Finals

SM Mall of Asia Arena, Pasay
Referees: Molly de Luna, Jaime Rivero, Irish Sano-an

=== Finals ===
The finals is a best-of-three playoff.

The NU Lady Bulldogs clinched their tenth consecutive finals appearance, and the first elimination round sweep since UAAP Season 82 (2019). UST emerged out of the stepladder semifinals as the winner, qualifying to its third finals in four seasons. This is a finals rematch from last season where the Tigresses won.

Game 3 was originally scheduled on December 14 at the Araneta Coliseum, coincidentally on the same day and venue as Game 3 (if necessary) of NCAA Season 100. The UAAP then rescheduled Game 3 to December 15.

One Sports, UAAP Varsity Channel

December 8, 2024
1:00 p.m.

NU Lady Bulldogs	72–71	UST Growling Tigresses
Scoring by quarter: 16–26, 21–20, 20–11, 15–14
Pts: Karl Ann Pingol 18; Rebs: Pingol, Fabruada, 9 Asts: Camille Clarin 7		Pts: Kent Pastrana 22; Rebs: CJ Maglupay 8 Asts: Angelika Soriano 4

Araneta Coliseum, Quezon City
Referees: Molly de Luna, Garchee Ferrer, Ace Sison

One Sports, UAAP Varsity Channel

December 11, 2024
1:30 p.m.

NU Lady Bulldogs	68–78	UST Growling Tigresses
Scoring by quarter: 9–20, 16–12, 24–16, 19–30
Pts: Cielo Pagdulagan 16; Rebs: Pingol, Pagdulagan, 9 Asts: Aloha Betanio 5		Pts: Brigette Santos 27; Rebs: Pastrana, Maglupay, 8 Asts: 3 players, 4 each

SM Mall of Asia Arena, Pasay
Referees: Molly de Luna, Boyong Manalac, Garchee Ferrer

One Sports, UAAP Varsity Channel

December 15, 2024
1:00 p.m.

NU Lady Bulldogs	78–73	UST Growling Tigresses
Scoring by quarter: 17–17, 21–21, 27–12, 13–23
Pts: Cielo Pagdulagan 21; Rebs: Pingol, Pagdulagan, 9 Asts: 5 players, 3 each		Pts: Karylle Sierba 20; Rebs: CJ Maglupay 23; Asts: Kent Pastrana 7
NU wins series, 2–1

Araneta Coliseum, Quezon City
Referees: Molly de Luna, Boyong Manalac, Irish Sano-an

- Finals Most Valuable Player: Cielo Pagdulagan (NU Lady Bulldogs)

=== Awards ===
UAAP Season 87 women's basketball champions
NU Lady Bulldogs
Eighth title

The awards were handed out prior to Game 2 of the Finals at the SM Mall of Asia Arena.

- Most Valuable Player: Kacey Dela Rosa (Ateneo Blue Eagles)
- Rookie of the Year: Cielo Pagdulagan (NU Lady Bulldogs)
- Mythical Five:
  - Kacey Dela Rosa (Ateneo Blue Eagles)
  - Kent Pastrana (UST Growling Tigresses)
  - Louna Ozar (UP Fighting Maroons)
  - Sarah Makanjoula (Ateneo Blue Eagles)
  - Angel Surada (NU Lady Bulldogs)

==== Player of the Week ====
The College Press Corps names a player of the week throughout the season.

Week	Player	Team
September 7–15	(Philippines) Kent Pastrana	UST Growling Tigresses
September 18–22	(Philippines) Jearzy Ganade	UE Lady Warriors
September 25–29	(Philippines) Luisa San Juan	De La Salle Lady Archers
October 2–6	(Philippines) Kacey Dela Rosa	Ateneo Blue Eagles
October 12–19	(Philippines) Tacky Tacatac	UST Growling Tigresses
October 26–30	(Philippines) Kacey dela Rosa	Ateneo Blue Eagles
November 13–23	(Philippines) Cielo Pagdulagan	NU Lady Bulldogs

=== Statistical leaders ===
==== Statistical points leaders ====
#	Player	Team	SP
1	(Philippines) Kacey Dela Rosa	Ateneo Blue Eagles	96.286
2	(Philippines) Kent Pastrana	UST Growling Tigresses	79.857
3	(Philippines) Louna Ozar	UP Fighting Maroons	67.571
4	(Philippines) Junize Calago	Ateneo Blue Eagles	67.0
5	(Nigeria) Sarah Makanjuola	Ateneo Blue Eagles	65.786

==== Season player highs ====
Statistic	Player	Team	Average
Points per game	(Philippines) Kacey dela Rosa	Ateneo Blue Eagles	22.07
Rebounds per game	(Philippines) Kacey dela Rosa	Ateneo Blue Eagles	16.0
Assists per game	(Philippines) Princess Ganade	UE Lady Warriors	5.14
Steals per game	(Philippines) Rachel Lacayanga	UE Lady Warriors	3.31
Blocks per game	(Philippines) Kacey dela Rosa	Ateneo Blue Eagles	2.29
Field goal percentage	(Nigeria) Sarah Makanjuola	Ateneo Blue Eagles	59.26%
Three-point field goal percentage	(Philippines) Tacky Tacatac	UST Growling Tigresses	39.17%
Free throw percentage	(Philippines) Princess Faburada	NU Lady Bulldogs	84.44%
Turnovers per game	(Philippines) Shane Salvani	FEU Lady Tamaraws	6.0

==== Game player highs ====
Statistic	Player	Team	Total	Opponent
Points	(Philippines) Kacey dela Rosa	Ateneo Blue Eagles	34	UP Fighting Maroons
Points	(Philippines) Luisa San Juan	De La Salle Lady Archers	34	FEU Lady Tamaraws
Rebounds	(Philippines) Kacey dela Rosa	Ateneo Blue Eagles	20	UST Growling Tigresses
Assists	(Philippines) Shane Salvani	FEU Lady Tamaraws	10	UST Growling Tigresses
Steals	(Philippines) Amby Ambos	UST Growling Tigresses	8	UE Lady Warriors
Blocks	(Philippines) Kacey dela Rosa	Ateneo Blue Eagles	5	UP Fighting Maroons
Blocks	(Philippines) Kacey dela Rosa	Ateneo Blue Eagles	5	UE Lady Warriors
Blocks	(Philippines) Rea Fe Ong	FEU Lady Tamaraws	5	De La Salle Lady Archers
Blocks	(Philippines) CJ Maglupay	UST Growling Tigresses	5	FEU Lady Tamaraws
Turnovers	(Philippines) Junize Calago	Ateneo Blue Eagles	12	UP Fighting Maroons

==== Season team highs ====
Category	Team	Average
Points per game	NU Lady Bulldogs	76.29
Rebounds per game	Ateneo Blue Eagles	50.71
Assists per game	NU Lady Bulldogs	21.86
Steals per game	UST Growling Tigresses	16.14
Blocks per game	Ateneo Blue Eagles	4.5
Field goal percentage	NU Lady Bulldogs	41.58%
Three point field goal percentage	NU Lady Bulldogs	27.19%
Free throw percentage	UST Growling Tigresses	68.04%
Turnovers per game	Adamson Lady Falcons	20.5

==== Game team highs ====
Statistic	Team	Total	Opponent
Points	NU Lady Bulldogs	103	UE Lady Warriors
Rebounds	Ateneo Blue Eagles	64	De La Salle Lady Archers
Assists	NU Lady Bulldogs	32	FEU Lady Tamaraws
Steals	UST Growling Tigresses	24	UE Lady Warriors
Blocks	Ateneo Blue Eagles	9	UP Fighting Maroons
Blocks	FEU Lady Tamaraws	9	De La Salle Lady Archers
Field goal percentage	NU Lady Bulldogs	56.0%	UE Lady Warriors
Three-point field goal percentage	NU Lady Bulldogs	47.0%	UST Growling Tigresses
Free throw percentage	UST Growling Tigresses	100%	De La Salle Lady Archers
Turnovers	UE Lady Warriors	43	Adamson Lady Falcons

== Boys' tournament ==
Opening day was on January 19, 2025, with FEU Diliman defeating defending champions Adamson.

=== Elimination round ===
==== Team standings ====
Pos	Team	W	L	PCT	GB	Qualification
1	NUNS Bullpups	13	1	.929	—	Twice-to-beat in the semifinals
2	UST Tiger Cubs (H)	12	2	.857	1	Twice-to-beat in the semifinals
3	FEU–D Baby Tamaraws	9	5	.643	4	Twice-to-win in the semifinals
4	Adamson Baby Falcons	7	7	.500	6	Twice-to-win in the semifinals
5	UE Junior Red Warriors	6	8	.429 (Note: Head-to-head record: UE 2–0 DLSZ)	7	
6	Zobel Junior Archers	6	8	.429	7	
7	Ateneo Blue Eagles	3	11	.214	10	
8	UPIS Junior Fighting Maroons	0	14	.000	13	

Rules for classification: 1) winning percentage; 2) if tied for No. 2 or 4, one-game playoff; 3) head-to-head record; 4) head-to-head point differential; 5) overall point differential
(H) Hosts

==== Match-up results ====
	Round 1							Round 2						
Team ╲ Game	1	2	3	4	5	6	7	8	9	10	11	12	13	14
Adamson	FEU school colors	UE school colors	UST school colors	La Salle school colors	Ateneo school colors	UP school colors	NU school colors	Ateneo school colors	NU school colors	UP school colors	La Salle school colors	FEU school colors	UST school colors	UE school colors
Ateneo	UE school colors	FEU school colors	La Salle school colors	NU school colors	Adamson school colors	UST school colors	UP school colors	Adamson school colors	FEU school colors	UE school colors	UST school colors	NU school colors	La Salle school colors	UP school colors
DLSZ	UP school colors	NU school colors	Ateneo school colors	Adamson school colors	UST school colors	FEU school colors	UE school colors	UST school colors	UP school colors	NU school colors	Adamson school colors	UE school colors	Ateneo school colors	FEU school colors
FEU–D	Adamson school colors	Ateneo school colors	NU school colors	UP school colors	UE school colors	La Salle school colors	UST school colors	NU school colors	Ateneo school colors	UST school colors	UP school colors	Adamson school colors	UE school colors	La Salle school colors
NUNS	UST school colors	La Salle school colors	FEU school colors	Ateneo school colors	UP school colors	UE school colors	Adamson school colors	FEU school colors	Adamson school colors	La Salle school colors	UE school colors	Ateneo school colors	UP school colors	UST school colors
UE	Ateneo school colors	Adamson school colors	UP school colors	UST school colors	FEU school colors	NU school colors	La Salle school colors	UP school colors	UST school colors	Ateneo school colors	NU school colors	La Salle school colors	FEU school colors	Adamson school colors
UPIS	La Salle school colors	UST school colors	UE school colors	FEU school colors	NU school colors	Adamson school colors	Ateneo school colors	UE school colors	La Salle school colors	Adamson school colors	FEU school colors	UST school colors	NU school colors	Ateneo school colors
UST	NU school colors	UP school colors	Adamson school colors	UE school colors	La Salle school colors	Ateneo school colors	FEU school colors	La Salle school colors	UE school colors	FEU school colors	Ateneo school colors	UP school colors	Adamson school colors	NU school colors

= Win; = OT win; = Loss; = OT loss

==== Scores ====
Results on top and to the right of the grey cells are for first-round games; those to the bottom and to the left of it are second-round games.

Teams	AdU	ADMU	DLSZ	FEU-D	NUNS	UE	UPIS	UST
Adamson Baby Falcons		56–52	69–77	71–75	60–73	75–66	65–54	68–84
Ateneo Blue Eagles	57–58		65–73	72–82	59–75	80–88	85–73	59–69
DLSZ Junior Archers	76–66	80–73		55–76	69–91	51–56	79–77*	67–82
FEU-D Baby Tamaraws	66–70	75–44	61–71		58–75	97–95**	84–60	72–80
NUNS Bullpups	71–49	87–71	86–60	59–57		78–77	90–34	71–60
UE Junior Warriors	69–60	56–64	71–65	62–66	70–89		100–60	59–69
UPIS Junior Fighting Maroons	67–84	69–70	63–72	70–86	90–71	72–85		45–98
UST Tiger Cubs	62–48	82–72	76–58	60–67	76–56	73–71	92–72	

Legend: Blue = left column team win; Red = top row team win.
Matches with lighter background shading were decided after overtime.

=== Bracket ===
Semifinals (Top 2 twice-to-beat)
1	NUNS	64
4	Adamson	62
2	UST	75
3	FEU–D	63

Finals (Best-of-three playoff)
1	NUNS	77	85	77
2	UST	70	89	83*

*Overtime

=== Semifinals ===
UST denied NUNS an unbeaten elimination round record, allowing for the usage of the regular Final Four format. NUNS and UST will have the twice-to-beat advantage in the semifinals against FEU Diliman and Adamson, respectively.

==== (1) NUNS vs. (4) Adamson ====
UAAP Varsity Channel

March 9, 2025
10:00 a.m.

NUNS Bullpups	64–62	Adamson Baby Falcons
Scoring by quarter: 20–11, 13–14, 14–17, 15–22
Pts: Miguel Palanca 13. Rebs: Miguel Palanca 14. Asts: Carl Alfanta 4.		Pts: Mark Esperanza 24. Rebs: Mark Esperanza 6. Asts: Mark Esperanza 6.
NUNS wins series in one game

Filoil EcoOil Centre, San Juan

==== (2) UST vs. (3) FEU Diliman ====
UAAP Varsity Channel

March 9, 2025
12:00 p.m.

UST Tiger Cubs	75–63	FEU–D Baby Tamaraws
Scoring by quarter: 23–11, 23–24, 20–19, 10–8
Pts: Joaquin Ludovice 16. Rebs: Racine Kane 15. Asts: Racine Kane 5.		Pts: Marc Burgos 17. Rebs: Cabs Cabonilas 13. Asts: Cabs Cabonilas 8.
UST wins series in one game

Filoil EcoOil Centre, San Juan

=== Finals ===
The winners of the semifinals meet in the best-of-three Finals.

UST qualified to their first finals since UAAP Season 73 (2010), while previous season's defeated finalist NUNS eliminated defending champions Adamson.

UAAP Varsity Channel

March 13, 2025
12:00 p.m.

NUNS Bullpups	77–70	UST Tiger Cubs
Scoring by quarter: 23–23, 16–15, 23–25, 8–14
Pts: Collins Akowe 25. Rebs: Collins Akowe 22. Asts: Roje Matias 5.		Pts: Racine Kane 24. Rebs: Racine Kane 12. Asts: Kirk Canete 7.

Filoil EcoOil Centre, San Juan

UAAP Varsity Channel

March 20, 2025
12:00 p.m.

NUNS Bullpups	85–89	UST Tiger Cubs
Scoring by quarter: 17–22, 19–26, 25–24, 24–17
Pts: Collins Akowe 28. Rebs: Collins Akowe 26. Asts: Carl Alfanta 5.		Pts: Koji Buenaflor 24. Rebs: Kirk Canete 6. Asts: Kirk Canete 5.

Filoil EcoOil Centre, San Juan

UAAP Varsity Channel

March 27, 2025
12:00 p.m.

NUNS Bullpups	77–83 (OT)	UST Tiger Cubs
Scoring by quarter: 18–24, 17–22, 14–14, 25–14, Overtime: 3–9
Pts: Collins Akowe 23. Rebs: Collins Akowe 24. Asts: Chad Cartel 6.		Pts: Racine Kane 28. Rebs: Racine Kane 17. Asts: Kirk Canete 10.
UST wins series, 2–1

Filoil EcoOil Centre, San Juan

- Finals Most Valuable Player: Racine Kane (UST Tiger Cubs)

=== Awards ===
UAAP Season 87 boys' basketball champions
UST Tiger Cubs
12th title

The awards were handed out prior to Game 2 of the Finals at the Filoil Flying V Arena.

- Most Valuable Player: Kieffer Alas (Zobel Junior Archers)
- Best Foreign Student-Athlete: Collins Akowe (NUNS Bullpups)
- Rookie of the Year: Jhustin Hallare (NUNS Bullpups)
- Mythical Five:
  - Collins Akowe (NUNS Bullpups)
  - Kieffer Alas (Zobel Junior Archers)
  - Cabs Cabonilas (FEU–D Baby Tamaraws)
  - Mark Esperanza (Adamson Baby Falcons)
  - Ethan Egea (UPIS Junior Fighting Maroons)

== Girls' tournament ==
This is the first girls' tournament since UAAP Season 82 (2020). NUNS is debuting their girls' team this season, while 2020's co-champions Adamson are not participating.

Opening day was on January 23, 2025, with NUNS defeating Ateneo by 94 points.

=== Elimination round ===
==== Team standings ====
Pos	Team	W	L	PCT	GB	Qualification
1	UST Junior Tigresses (H)	6	0	1.000	—	Advance to the Finals
2	NUNS Lady Bullpups	4	2	.667	2	Advance to the Finals
3	Zobel Junior Lady Archers	2	4	.333	4	
4	Ateneo Blue Eagles	0	6	.000	6	

Rules for classification: 1) winning percentage; 2) if tied for No. 2, one-game playoff; 3) head-to-head record; 4) head-to-head point differential; 5) overall point differential
(H) Hosts

==== Match-up results ====
	Round 1			Round 2		
Team ╲ Game	1	2	3	4	5	6
Ateneo	NU school colors	UST school colors	La Salle school colors	UST school colors	NU school colors	La Salle school colors
DLSZ	UST school colors	NU school colors	Ateneo school colors	NU school colors	UST school colors	Ateneo school colors
NUNS	Ateneo school colors	La Salle school colors	UST school colors	La Salle school colors	Ateneo school colors	UST school colors
UST	La Salle school colors	Ateneo school colors	NU school colors	Ateneo school colors	La Salle school colors	NU school colors

= Win; = OT win; = Loss; = OT loss

==== Scores ====
Results on top and to the right of the grey cells are for first-round games; those to the bottom and to the left of it are second-round games.

Teams	ADMU	DLSZ	NUNS	UST
Ateneo Blue Eagles		16–115	15–109	29–117
DLSZ Junior Lady Archers	114–24		44–86	50–112
NUNS Lady Bullpups	141–40	117–61		69–75
UST Junior Tigresses	170–46	107–47	91–66	

Legend: Blue = left column team win; Red = top row team win.
Matches with lighter background shading were decided after overtime.

=== Finals ===
UST and NUNS qualified to the best-of-three Finals after finishing in the top two places after the elimination round.

UAAP Varsity Channel

March 13, 2025
10:00 a.m.

UST Junior Tigresses	85–57	NUNS Lady Bullpups
Scoring by quarter: 27–19, 17–17, 18–13, 23–8
Pts: Barby Dajao 25. Rebs: Barby Dajao 14. Asts: Barby Dajao 5.		Pts: Marielle Avila 15. Rebs: Aubrey Lapasaran 7. Asts: KJ Badajos

Filoil EcoOil Centre, San Juan

UAAP Varsity Channel

March 20, 2025
10:00 a.m.

UST Junior Tigresses	63–57	NUNS Lady Bullpups
Scoring by quarter: 21–23, 21–16, 8–14, 13–4
Pts: Barby Dajao 22. Rebs: Barby Dajao 15. Asts: Rhiane Perez 5.		Pts: Aubrey Lapasaran 22. Rebs: Abong, Rosano, 14. Asts: Aubrey Lapasaran 3.
UST wins series, 2–0

Filoil EcoOil Centre, San Juan

- Finals Most Valuable Player: Barby Dajao (UST Junior Tigresses)

UST completed a perfect season, winning all 6 elimination round games, and sweeping the Finals 2–0.

=== Awards ===
UAAP Season 87 girls' basketball champions
UST Junior Tigresses
Second title, second consecutive title

The awards were handed out prior to Game 2 of the Finals at the Filoil Flying V Arena.

- Most Valuable Player: Barby Dajao (UST Junior Tigresses)
- Rookie of the Year: Rhiane Perez (UST Junior Tigresses)
- Mythical Five:
  - Barby Dajao (UST Junior Tigresses)
  - Erica De Luna (Zobel Junior Lady Archers)
  - Rhiane Perez (UST Junior Tigresses)
  - Aubrey Lapasaran (NUNS Lady Bullpups)
  - Katrina Insoy (UST Junior Tigresses)

== Junior high school tournament ==
The junior high school tournament was held alongside the collegiate tournaments in the first semester. The tournament started on September 8, 2024 at the Adamson Gym.

=== Elimination round ===
The UAAP postponed October 23 games due to inclement weather caused by Tropical Storm Kristine (Trami). The UAAP further postponed November 17 games due to Super Typhoon Pepito (Man-yi).

==== Team standings ====
Pos	Team	W	L	PCT	GB	Qualification
1	UE Junior Red Warriors	13	1	.929	—	Twice-to-beat in the semifinals
2	FEU–D Baby Tamaraws	12	2	.857	1	Twice-to-beat in the semifinals
3	UST Tiger Cubs	10	4	.714	3	Twice-to-win in the semifinals
4	NUNS Bullpups	7	7	.500	6	Twice-to-win in the semifinals
5	Zobel Junior Archers	6	8	.429	7	
6	Ateneo Blue Eagles	5	9	.357	8	
7	Adamson Baby Falcons	3	11	.214	10	
8	UPIS Junior Fighting Maroons (H)	0	14	.000	13	

(H) Hosts

==== Match-up results ====
	Round 1							Round 2						
Team ╲ Game	1	2	3	4	5	6	7	8	9	10	11	12	13	14
Adamson	FEU school colors	La Salle school colors	UST school colors	Ateneo school colors	NU school colors	UP school colors	UE school colors	NU school colors	Ateneo school colors	FEU school colors	UST school colors	UP school colors	UE school colors	La Salle school colors
Ateneo	UP school colors	UST school colors	La Salle school colors	Adamson school colors	FEU school colors	UE school colors	NU school colors	UP school colors	Adamson school colors	UE school colors	La Salle school colors	NU school colors	UST school colors	FEU school colors
DLSZ	NU school colors	Adamson school colors	Ateneo school colors	UE school colors	FEU school colors	UST school colors	UP school colors	UE school colors	FEU school colors	UP school colors	Ateneo school colors	UST school colors	NU school colors	Adamson school colors
FEU–D	Adamson school colors	NU school colors	UE school colors	UP school colors	La Salle school colors	Ateneo school colors	UST school colors	UST school colors	La Salle school colors	Adamson school colors	NU school colors	UE school colors	UP school colors	Ateneo school colors
NUNS	La Salle school colors	FEU school colors	UP school colors	UST school colors	Adamson school colors	UE school colors	Ateneo school colors	Adamson school colors	UP school colors	UE school colors	UST school colors	FEU school colors	Ateneo school colors	La Salle school colors
UE	UST school colors	UP school colors	FEU school colors	La Salle school colors	NU school colors	Ateneo school colors	Adamson school colors	La Salle school colors	UST school colors	NU school colors	Ateneo school colors	UP school colors	FEU school colors	Adamson school colors
UPIS	Ateneo school colors	UE school colors	NU school colors	FEU school colors	Adamson school colors	UST school colors	La Salle school colors	Ateneo school colors	UST school colors	NU school colors	La Salle school colors	UE school colors	Adamson school colors	FEU school colors
UST	UE school colors	Ateneo school colors	Adamson school colors	NU school colors	La Salle school colors	UP school colors	FEU school colors	FEU school colors	UP school colors	UE school colors	NU school colors	Adamson school colors	La Salle school colors	Ateneo school colors

Source: UAAP on Livestats
= Win; = OT win; = Loss; = OT loss

==== Scores ====
Results on top and to the right of the grey cells are for first-round games; those to the bottom and to the left of it are second-round games.

Teams	AdU	ADMU	DLSZ	FEU–D	NUNS	UE	UPIS	UST
Adamson Baby Falcons		73–79	82–97	55–81	62–73	63–85	85–70	67–91
Ateneo Blue Eagles	68–72		72–64	61–80	89–91	59–70	76–42	77–100
DLSZ Junior Archers	73–59	65–74		72–78	83–62	59–80	75–69	83–80
FEU–D Baby Tamaraws	96–84	69–55	83–79		89–71	74–82	85–63	90–83
NUNS Bullpups	76–64	77–76	86–76	61–78		64–89	94–76	83–84
UE Junior Warriors	100–58	83–61	79–70	66–81	72–59		91–44	69–51
UPIS Junior Fighting Maroons	58–63	60–78	74–79	51–73	78–102	65–95		53–87
UST Tiger Cubs	82–65	105–71	72–50	76–75	80–70	78–80	90–59	

Source: UAAP on Livestats
Legend: Blue = left column team win; Red = top row team win.
Matches with lighter background shading were decided after overtime.

=== Bracket ===
Semifinals (Top 2 twice-to-beat)
1	UE	85
4	NUNS	64
2	FEU–D	75	61
3	UST	84	67

Finals (Best-of-three playoff)
1	UE	84	76	78
3	UST	98	70	47

=== Semifinals ===
The top two seeded teams after the elimination round have the twice-to-beat advantage in the semifinals, where they have to be beaten twice, while their opponents only once.

==== (1) UE vs. (4) NUNS ====
UE clinched the first playoff berth after their win against NUNS. UE then clinched the #1 seed with a win against Adamson. The NUNS Bullpups defeat of DLSZ and UST's win over Ateneo eliminated the defeated teams and clinched qualification for NUNS as the #4 seed.

UAAP Varsity Channel

December 4, 2024
11:00 a.m.

UE Junior Red Warriors	85–64	NUNS Bullpups
Scoring by quarter: 24–17, 30–19, 13–14, 18–14
Pts: Mav Mesina 19; Rebs: Goodluck Okebata 10; Asts: Mav Mesina 5		Pts: Big Mac Tadeo 17; Rebs: Chester Tulabut 11; Asts: Zui Urea 6
UE wins series in one game

SM Mall of Asia Arena, Pasay
Referees: Juner Bayais, Garchee Ferrer, Jesus Boras

==== (2) FEU Diliman vs. (3) UST ====
FEU DIliman clinched a semifinal berth after winning against NUNS. FEU's second round win over UE denied the Junior Warriors winning all elimination round games, and guaranteed that the playoffs will be on the traditional final four format. FEU clinched the twice-to-beat advantage in their win against UPIS. UST's win over DLSZ clinched their semifinal appearance, and had all UST basketball teams participating the first semester qualify to the playoffs.

UAAP Varsity Channel

December 4, 2024
1:00 p.m.

FEU–D Baby Tamaraws	75–84	UST Tiger Cubs
Scoring by quarter: 23–19, 15–22, 19–26, 18–17
Pts: Anton Lopez 23; Rebs: Carino, Pasinos 14; Asts: CP Miranda 4		Pts: Jhon Canapi 26; Rebs: Nickson Cabanero 16; Asts: Nickson Cabanero 7

SM Mall of Asia Arena, Pasay
Referees: Edgar Orpilla, Ace Sison, Oliver Angeles

UAAP Varsity Channel

December 8, 2024
10:00 a.m.

FEU–D Baby Tamaraws	61–67	UST Tiger Cubs
Scoring by quarter: 16–21, 16–14, 16–17, 13–15
Pts: Lakay Pasinos 17; Rebs: Lakay Pasinos 15; Asts: Anton Lopez 7		Pts: Bathan, Cabanero 15; Rebs: Nickson Cabanero 7 Asts: Nickson Cabanero 6
UST wins series in two games

Araneta Coliseum, Quezon City
Referees: Jesus Boras, John Cabiles, Oliver Angeles

=== Finals ===
The finals is a best-of-three playoff. The UE Junior Warriors defeated the NUNS Bullpups to advance to the finals, while UST defeated twice-to-beat FEU Diliman to advance.

UAAP Varsity Channel

December 11, 2024
10:00 a.m.

UE Junior Red Warriors	84–98	UST Tiger Cubs
Scoring by quarter: 21–26, 14–33, 21–18, 28–21
Pts: Oraa, Panganiban, 14; Rebs: Oraa, Reyes, 6 Asts: Mav Mesina 7		Pts: Jhon Canapi 30; Rebs: Nickson Cabanero 16; Asts: Nickson Cabanero 8

SM Mall of Asia Arena, Pasay
Referees: John Cabiles, Jaime Jimenez, Oliver Angeles

UAAP Varsity Channel

December 15, 2024
11:00 a.m.

UE Junior Red Warriors	76–70	UST Tiger Cubs
Scoring by quarter: 21–19, 19–17, 13–20, 23–14
Pts: Mav Mesina 21; Rebs: Gab De Los Reyes 21; Asts: Mav Mesina 5		Pts: Canapi, Jubilado, 21; Rebs: Gab Castro 13; Asts: Jhon Canapi 4

Araneta Coliseum, Quezon City
Referees: John Cabiles, Juner Bayais, Michael Ogao

UAAP Varsity Channel

December 20, 2024
10:00 a.m.

UE Junior Red Warriors	78–47	UST Tiger Cubs
Scoring by quarter: 15–15, 19–8, 20–12, 24–12
Pts: Ethan Oraa 13; Rebs: Gab Delos Reyes 16; Asts: Mav Mesina 6		Pts: Dustin Bathan 16; Rebs: Gan Castro 11; Asts: Bathan, Castro, 2
UE wins series, 2–1

Filoil EcoOil Centre, San Juan

- Finals Most Valuable Player: Gab Delos Reyes (UE Junior Red Warriors)

=== Awards ===
UAAP Season 87 juniors' basketball champions
UE Junior Red Warriors
First title

The awards were handed out prior to Game 2 of the Finals at the Araneta Coliseum.

- Most Valuable Player: Zane Kallos (Ateneo Blue Eagles)
- Mythical Five:
  - Zane Kallos (Ateneo Blue Eagles)
  - Andwale Cabanero (UST Tiger Cubs)
  - John Kanapi (UST Tiger Cubs)
  - Bruce Tubongbanua (UPIS Junior Fighting Maroons)
  - Jhustin Hallare (UPIS Junior Fighting Maroons)

== Overall championship points ==
Pts.	Ranking
15	Champion
12	2nd
10	3rd
8	4th
6	5th
4	6th
2	7th
1	8th
—	Did not join
WD	Withdrew

=== Collegiate division ===
Rank	Team	Men	Women	Total
1st	UST	10	12	22
2nd	UP	15	6	21
3rd	Adamson	8	10	18
4th	NU	2	15	17
5th	La Salle	12	4	16
6th	Ateneo	1	8	9
7th	UE	6	1	7
8th	FEU	4	2	6

=== High school division ===
Rank	Team	Boys	Girls	JHS	Total
1st	UST	15	15	12	42
2nd	NUNS	12	12	8	32
3rd	FEU–D	10	–	10	20
4th	UE	6	–	15	21
5th	DLSZ	4	10	6	20
6th	Ateneo	2	8	4	14
7th	Adamson	8	–	2	10
8th	UPIS	1	–	1	2

In case of a tie, the team with the higher position in any tournament is ranked higher. If both are still tied, they are listed by alphabetical order.

How rankings are determined:

- Ranks fifth to eighth determined by elimination round standings.
- Semifinal losers ranked by elimination round standings.
  - If stepladder: Loser of stepladder semifinals round 1 is ranked fourth
  - If stepladder: Loser of stepladder semifinals round 2 is ranked third
- Loser of the finals is ranked second
- Champion is ranked first

== See also ==
- NCAA Season 100 basketball tournaments
