= Jonathan Galloway =

Guamanian basketball player

No. 53 – Pelister
- Position: Power forward / center
- League: Macedonian League

Personal information
- Born: 19 June 1996 (age 30) Brentwood, California, U.S.
- Listed height: 6 ft 10 in (2.08 m)
- Listed weight: 235 lb (107 kg)

Career information
- High school: Salesian (Richmond, California)
- College: UC Irvine (2015–2019)
- NBA draft: 2019: undrafted
- Playing career: 2019–present

Career history
- 2019–2020: Bakken Bears
- 2020: Zadar
- 2020–2021: Monthey-Chablais
- 2021: TED Ankara Kolejliler
- 2021–2022: Bisons Loimaa
- 2022: BK Děčín
- 2022–2023: Spinelli Massagno
- 2023–2024: APOEL
- 2024: Lions de Genève
- 2024–2025: Peja
- 2025–present: Pelister

Career highlights
- Swiss League Cup winner (2023); Basketligaen champion (2020); First-team All-Big West (2019); 3× Big West Defensive Player of the Year (2017–2019)
Medals
Representing Guam
Pacific Games
Gold medal – first place	2015 Papua New Guinea	Team
Gold medal – first place	2019 Samoa	Team

Jonathan Galloway (born 19 June 1996) is an American professional basketball player for Pelister of the Macedonian League. He played college basketball for the UC Irvine Anteaters and represents the Guam national basketball team.

== High school career ==
Galloway attended Salesian College Preparatory in Richmond, California, where he averaged 15 points, eight rebounds and three blocks as a senior.

== College career ==
After redshirting the 2014–15 season, Galloway made his college basketball debut for the UC Irvine Anteaters in the 2015–16 season. As a senior in 2018–19, he was named the Big West Conference Defensive Player of the Year for the third season in a row, becoming the first three-time recipient of the honor.

== Professional career ==
In the 2019–20 season, Galloway played for the Bakken Bears of the Danish Basketligaen. He averaged 8.2 points, 8.9 rebounds, 1.5 blocks and 1.2 assists per game and helped the Bears win the Basketligaen title.

In the 2020–21 season, Galloway started with Zadar in Croatia before joining Swiss team Monthey-Chablais in November 2020.

In the 2021–22 season, Galloway started with Turkish club TED Ankara Kolejliler before joining Finnish team Bisons Loimaa in November 2021. In April 2022, he joined BK Děčín in the Czech Republic.

For the 2022–23 season, Galloway joined Spinelli Massagno of the Swiss Basketball League.

== National team career ==
Galloway represents the Guam national basketball team where he has played at the Pacific Games.

Galloway represented Guam during the 2021 FIBA Asia Cup qualifiers.

In February 2023, Galloway helped Guam qualify for the 2025 FIBA Asia Cup qualifiers.

== Personal ==
Galloway holds a bachelor's degree in criminology, law and society.
