= Quentin Millora-Brown =

Filipino basketball player (born 2000)

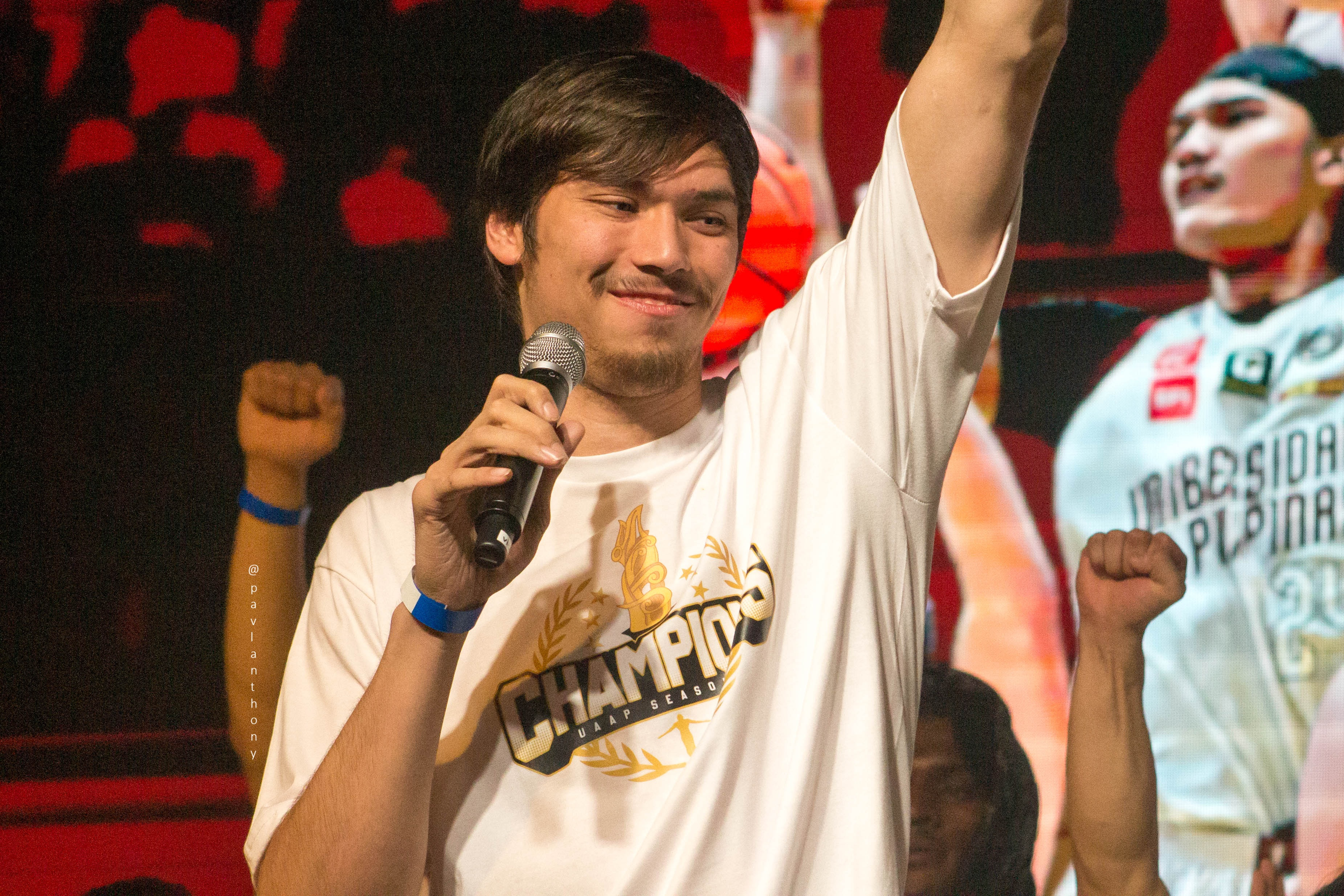
- QMB during the UAAP Season 87 in 2024

No. 42 – Nagoya Diamond Dolphins
- Position: Center
- League: B.League

Personal information
- Born: August 9, 2000 (age 26) Washington, D.C., U.S.
- Listed height: 6 ft 10 in (2.08 m)
- Listed weight: 245 lb (111 kg)

Career information
- High school: Bishop O'Connell (Arlington, Virginia); South County (Lorton, Virginia)
- College: Rice (2018–2019); Vanderbilt (2020–2023); The Citadel (2023–2024); UP (2024)
- Playing career: 2026–present

Career history
- 2026: Chiba Jets
- 2026–present: Nagoya Diamond Dolphins

Career highlights
- UAAP champion (2024); Southern Conference All-Defensive Team (2024)

Quentin "QMB" Millora-Brown (born August 9, 2000) is a Filipino-American professional basketball player for the Nagoya Diamond Dolphins of the Japanese B. League. He played college basketball for the UP Fighting Maroons. Prior to winning a UAAP championship with UP, he also played for the Rice Owls, Vanderbilt Commodores, and The Citadel Bulldogs.

== Early life and high school career ==
Millora-Brown was born to Bryan W. Brown and Rosette Millora. He has one sister, Sasha. He was born in Washington D.C., but grew up in Virginia.

Growing up, Millora-Brown's first sport was fencing. His father was a fencer for the College of William & Mary and was even the team captain. According to his father's law office biography, Bryan W. Brown was a most valuable fencer and Virginia state champion in épée and foil.

In middle school, Millora-Brown started playing basketball more often, and chose to pursue basketball. He played in the Filipino-American Youth Basketball Association, which offered youth basketball programming near Washington, D.C. Millora-Brown first studied at Bishop O'Connell High School. He then transferred to South County High School in his senior year, where he learned under Mike Robinson. Under Robinson's coaching, he led South County to its first state title. He was also named as the district, regional player and state player of the year with averages of 16 points, 12 rebounds, five blocks, and four assists.

== College career ==
=== Rice ===
Millora-Brown first played for the Rice Owls. In his freshman season, Millora-Brown played all 32 games. He averaged 7.2 points, 5.9 rebounds, and 1.2 blocked shots per game. He also set a freshman record with a field goal percentage of 59.8%. Rice finished with a record of 13–19.

=== Vanderbilt ===
On April 18, 2019, Millora-Brown decided to transfer schools. On July 16, 2019, it was announced that he had joined the Vanderbilt Commodores. He redshirted the 2019–20 season.

In his first full season with the team, Millora-Brown shot around 70% from the field. However, he contracted COVID-19 during the season, which affected his performance.

In his senior season, Millora-Brown had a bigger role as center Liam Robbins was still recovering from a foot injury. He led the team in blocks and was second on the team in rebounds. One of the highlights of the season was when he limited Oscar Tshiebwe to 11 points and 17 rebounds and drew two flagrant fouls from him in a loss to Kentucky. That season, Vanderbilt made it to the quarterfinals of the 2022 National Invitational Tournament.

As a fifth-year senior, he averaged 3.5 points and continued to gain more minutes as Robbins was hurt throughout the season. However, his field goal percentage dropped to 48.5%

Initially, Millora-Brown was set to return for one more season. However, he decided to enter the transfer portal as a graduate student.

=== Citadel ===
Millora-Brown then committed to The Citadel Bulldogs. The Citadel's head coach, Ed Conroy, was previously his assistant coach for two years at Vanderbilt. In his final season in the NCAA, he averaged 11.2 points and 9.4 rebounds, shooting 59.4% from the floor. He also broke school records for rebounds and double-doubles, and was named to the SoCon All-Defensive Team.

=== UP ===
On July 1, 2024, it was announced that Millora-Brown would come to the Philippines and commit to the UP Fighting Maroons of the UAAP. He was eligible to play in Season 87 college season as a master's student. His grandfather had been a UP student, getting his medical degree in 1963.

In his UP debut, Millora-Brown had seven points, 17 rebounds, and two blocks in a win over Ateneo. Towards the end of the elimination rounds, he had to miss a game to return to the US and attend his grandfather's burial. UP finished the elimination rounds with a record of 11–3, and second in the standings. In the Final Four, he had nine points, 19 rebounds, three assists, and four blocks against UST as UP made its fourth straight finals appearance. Before the UAAP finals, he was averaging 8.6 points and 10.1 rebounds.

In Game 1 of the UAAP finals against DLSU, Millora-Brown led UP to the win with a career-high 17 points, nine rebounds, three assists, and two steals. He then contributed 11 points and eight rebounds, but DLSU overcame an eight-point third quarter lead to tie the series. In Game 3, he led the team with 14 points, 10 rebounds, a steal and a block. He also made the game-sealing free throws with 11.3 seconds remaining to give UP its second UAAP title in four seasons.

== Club ==
=== Macau Black Bears ===
Seven months after winning a title with UP, Millora-Brown signed with the Macau Black Bears.

=== Chiba Jets ===
Millora-Brown joined the Chiba Jets of the B.League in January 2026 in the middle of the 2025–26 B1 League season.

=== Nagoya Diamond Dolphins ===
Millora-Brown joined the Nagoya Diamond Dolphins for the 2026–27 B1 League season.

== National team ==
Millora-Brown has plans to play for the Philippine national team, with the Samahang Basketbol ng Pilipinas (SBP) trying to verify his eligibility to play as a local under FIBA eligibility rules of having obtained a passport before age 16. However, a FIBA ruling was said to have classified him as a naturalized player. Through his lawyers, he appealed their decision. On August 15, 2025, the ruling was reversed, reclassifying him from a naturalized player to a local. He made his debut with the national team during the first round of qualifiers for the 2027 FIBA World Cup.

== College career statistics ==
=== NCAA ===
Year	Team	GP	GS	MPG	FG%	3P%	FT%	RPG	APG	SPG	BPG	PPG
2018–19	Rice	32	27	23.3	.598	.000	.450	5.9	1.2	.3	1.2	7.2
2020–21	Vanderbilt	19	8	13.5	.703	.000	.353	3.2	.6	.2	.3	3.1
2021–22	Vanderbilt	36	30	24.3	.649	.000	.489	5.6	1.2	.4	1.1	5.3
2022–23	Vanderbilt	36	27	18.5	.485	.333	.596	4.3	.7	.4	.6	3.5
2023–24	Citadel	32	32	32.3	.594	.150	.547	9.4	2.0	.7	1.5	11.2
Career		155	124	23.1	.595	.174	.513	5.9	1.2	.4	1.0	6.2

== Personal life ==
Millora-Brown is Filipino-American. His maternal grandparents were immigrants from the Philippines who raised his mother near Albany, New York.

Millora-Brown has a mechanical engineering degree from Vanderbilt and a graduate certificate in leadership from The Citadel. In his freshman year, he made the Conference USA Commissioner's Honor Roll. In his junior year, he made the SEC Academic Honor Roll.
