= A. J. Edu =

Cypriot-born Filipino basketball player

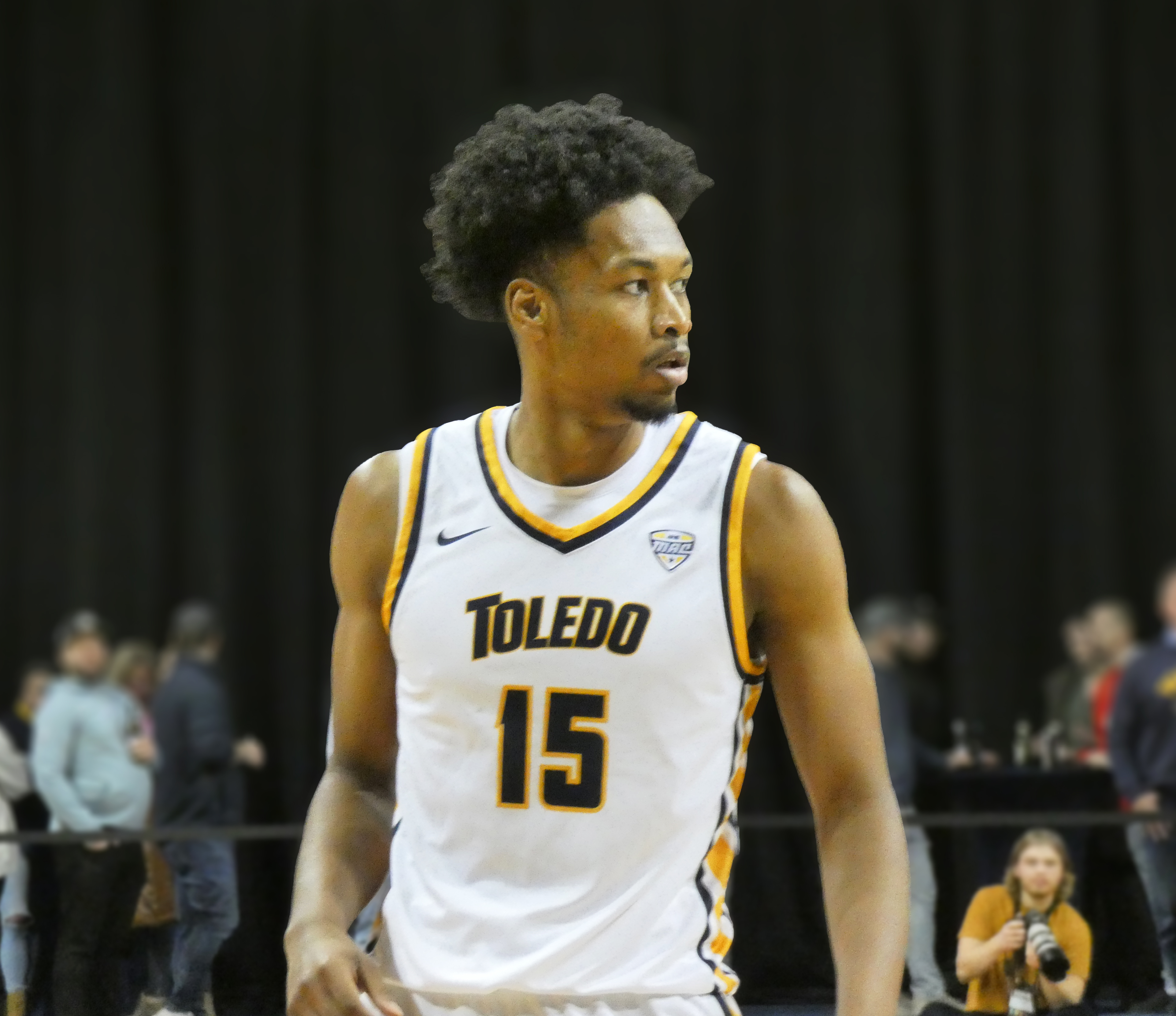
- Edu with the Toledo Rockets in 2022

No. 15 – Gunma Crane Thunders
- Position: Power forward / center
- League: B.League

Personal information
- Born: January 1, 2000 (age 26) Cyprus
- Listed height: 6 ft 10 in (2.08 m)
- Listed weight: 224 lb (102 kg)

Career information
- High school: SGS College (Bristol, England)
- College: Toledo (2018–2023)
- Playing career: 2023–present

Career history
- 2023–2024: Toyama Grouses
- 2024–2025: Nagasaki Velca
- 2025–present: Gunma Crane Thunders

Career highlights
- MAC All-Freshman Team (2019)

Ariel John Litang Edu (born January 1, 2000) is a Cypriot-born Filipino professional basketball player for the Gunma Crane Thunders of the Japanese B.League. Listed at 6 feet 10 inches (2.08 m) and 224 pounds (102 kg), he plays the power forward and center positions. He is a member of the Philippine men's national basketball team.

== Early life and career ==
Edu was born in Cyprus to a Nigerian father Ayotunde Edu and Filipina mother Josie Litang-Edu. His mother is a native of Surigao City, Philippines but moved to England for work after finishing her education. She met Edu's father, a mathematics and physics professor. Standing 6 ft 8 in (2.03 m), Ayotunde played basketball in his home country before becoming a high school coach in Wales.

Edu began playing basketball at the age of seven in the junior ranks of Cypriot club AEL Limassol. He also played soccer in his childhood but began focusing on basketball due to his exceptional height. After his family moved to England a few years later, Edu joined the Bristol Flyers cadet team and the Swansea Storm in the Wales League. With Swansea, he established himself as a top player at the under-16, under-18, and men's first division levels. With the Flyers, he trained with many former college basketball players. In 2017, Edu began playing for South Gloucestershire and Stroud College in Bristol, England, where he was considered one of the top prospects in the country while competing in the Elite Academy Basketball League (EABL). After the 2017–18 season, he was named EABL West Conference Defensive Player of the Year, averaging 18.6 points, 14.7 rebounds, and 2.7 blocks per game. In 2018, he was invited to a Basketball Without Borders camp in Los Angeles.

== College career ==
On April 12, 2018, Edu signed a National Letter of Intent with the Toledo Rockets under head coach of Tod Kowalczyk. He played all 33 games, averaging 3.6 points, 3.9 rebounds and a team-high 1.7 blocks in 14.3 minutes per game. Edu recorded 57 blocks in the season, the most by a freshman in program history. He was named to the Mid-American Conference (MAC) All-Freshman Team. Edu missed his entire sophomore season recovering from a knee injury suffered at the 2019 FIBA Under-19 World Cup. In December 2020, Edu tore his meniscus and missed the rest of the season. On July 9, 2021, he tore his left ACL during a practice.

== Professional career ==
=== Japanese B.League (2023–present) ===
On June 20, 2023, Edu signed his first professional contract with the Toyama Grouses.

On July 2, 2024, he signed with the Nagasaki Velca.

On June 16, 2025, he signed with the Gunma Crane Thunders.

== National team career ==
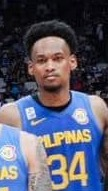
Edu during the 2023 FIBA Basketball World Cup

Edu was granted Filipino citizenship from a young age after difficulties in receiving a Cypriot passport, which made him eligible to play for the Philippines in FIBA competition. However, he still drew interest from the Nigeria, Cyprus, and Great Britain. In 2017, Edu joined the Philippines at the FIBA 3x3 U18 World Cup in Chengdu, China. He debuted for the Philippines at the 2018 FIBA Under-18 Asian Championship in Bangkok, Thailand. In 6 games, Edu averaged 14.2 points, 11.5 rebounds, and 2.8 blocks per game, finishing with 4 double-doubles. He led his team to a fourth-place finish at the tournament, giving them a berth for the 2019 FIBA Under-19 World Cup. About two minutes into his first game at the Under-19 World Cup, Edu suffered a torn ACL and torn meniscus in his right knee, as well as a hairline fracture on his right femur. He missed the rest of the tournament with the injury.

Edu was included in the 21-man pool for the 2023 FIBA World Cup, where he was eventually included in the final 12-man lineup.

== Career statistics ==
Legend
GP	Games played	GS	Games started	MPG	Minutes per game
FG%	Field goal percentage	3P%	3-point field goal percentage	FT%	Free throw percentage
RPG	Rebounds per game	APG	Assists per game	SPG	Steals per game
BPG	Blocks per game	PPG	Points per game	**Bold**	Career high

=== College ===
Year	Team	GP	GS	MPG	FG%	3P%	FT%	RPG	APG	SPG	BPG	PPG
2018–19	Toledo	33	1	14.3	.387	**.182**	**.750**	3.9	**.7**	.3	1.7	**3.6**
2020–21	Toledo	2	**2**	**23.5**	.143	.0	.0	**7.0**	.5	.0	**2.0**	1.0
2021–22	Toledo	2	0	2.5	.0	.0	.250	.5	.0	**.5**	.0	0.5
2022–23	Toledo	**35**	0	12.2	**.492**	.0	.712	3.0	.3	.2	.8	2.8
Career		72	3	13.2	.417	.182	.714	3.5	.5	.2	1.2	3.1

=== B. League ===
Year	Team	GP	GS	MPG	FG%	3P%	FT%	RPG	APG	SPG	BPG	PPG
2023–24	Toyama	14	12	29.2	.507	.258	.676	8.8	1.4	0.9	0.6	13.1
