= List of members in major Philippine collegiate sports =

This is a list of colleges and universities that are members of the highest level of competition in collegiate sports in the Philippines. Unlike the United States, which works primarily under a tiered system in the National Collegiate Athletic Association (US NCAA), the Philippines' collegiate sports system is fragmented but contains multiple major athletic associations based on different factors including reach, population, and television rights.

Historically, the oldest leagues based in Luzon are the National Collegiate Athletic Association (NCAA Philippines) founded in 1924 and the University Athletic Association of the Philippines (UAAP) founded in 1938. Meanwhile, the Cebu Schools Athletic Foundation, Inc. (CESAFI) is the top-flight athletic association in the Visayas.

The list is arranged in order of the respective leagues' founding dates and includes former members and guest teams.

== Luzon ==
=== NCAA ===
==== Current schools ====
Colors	School	Location	Founded	Joined	Type	Seniors Division		Juniors Division	
Colors	School	Location	Founded	Joined	Type	Men	Women	Boys	Girls
	Arellano University	Manila	1938	2009	Private	Chiefs	Lady Chiefs	Braves	Lady Braves
	Colegio de San Juan de Letran	Manila	1620	1926–1933, 1936– (Note: Letran first joined the NCAA in 1926, withdrew in 1933, and returned in 1936.)	Private (Dominican)	Knights	Lady Knights	Squires	—N/a
	De La Salle-College of Saint Benilde	Manila	1980	1998	Private (Lasallian)	Blazers	Lady Blazers	Greenies	Lady Greenies
	La Salle Green Hills	Mandaluyong	1959	1968–1981, 1998– (Note: LSGH first joined the NCAA in 1968, withdrew in 1981, and returned in 1998.)	Private (Lasallian)	Blazers	Lady Blazers	Greenies	Lady Greenies
	Emilio Aguinaldo College	Manila	1957	2009	Private	Generals	Lady Generals	Brigadiers	Lady Brigadiers
	Immaculate Conception Academy	Dasmariñas, Cavite	1947	2009	Private	Generals	Lady Generals	Brigadiers	Lady Brigadiers
	José Rizal University	Mandaluyong	1919	1927	Private	Heavy Bombers	Lady Bombers	Light Bombers	Light Lady Bombers
	Lyceum of the Philippines University	Manila	1952	2011	Private	Pirates	Lady Pirates	Junior Pirates	Junior Lady Pirates
	Lyceum of the Philippines University – Cavite (Note: The lack of a high school varsity program prevented Lyceum from being a guest member for Season 85. In Season 87, the high school program of Lyceum of the Philippines University–Cavite was accepted as the juniors team of Lyceum.)	General Trias, Cavite	2008	2011	Private	Pirates	Lady Pirates	Junior Pirates	Junior Lady Pirates
	Mapúa University	Manila	1925	1930	Private	Cardinals	Lady Cardinals	Red Robins	—N/a
	Malayan High School of Science (Note: Malayan High School of Science represents Mapúa in the juniors' division since 2008. Mapúa was formerly represented by its high school until 2005.)	Manila	2005	2008	Private	Cardinals	Lady Cardinals	Red Robins	—N/a
	San Beda University (Note: San Beda's basic education unit is in its Taytay campus)	Manila	1901	1924–1983, 1986– (Note: San Beda first joined the NCAA in 1924, withdrew in 1983, and returned in 1986.)	Private (Benedictine)	Red Lions	Lady Red Lions	Red Cubs	Lady Red Cubs
	San Beda University	Taytay, Rizal	2004	1924–1983, 1986–	Private (Benedictine)	Red Lions	Lady Red Lions	Red Cubs	Lady Red Cubs
	San Sebastian College – Recoletos	Manila	1941	1969	Private (Augustinian Recollect)	Golden Stags	Lady Stags	Staglets	—N/a
	University of Perpetual Help System DALTA	Las Piñas	1975	1984	Private	Altas	Lady Altas	Junior Altas	Junior Lady Altas

==== Guest schools ====
In NCAA Season 85, following the departure of Philippine Christian University, the league invited three guest schools to participate in the league, with two eventually being elevated to full membership with another guest school joining years later gaining full membership as well. Starting NCAA Season 101, the league followed in a similar fashion to the UAAP wherein certain guest schools were invited to participate in specific events only.

Colors	School	Location	Founded	Years Active	Seniors Division		Juniors Division	Guest Membership
Colors	School	Location	Founded	Years Active	Men	Women	Boys	Guest Membership
	Angeles University Foundation	Angeles City	1962	2009–2010	Great Danes	Lady Danes	Baby Danes	All events
	Centro Escolar University	Manila	1907	2026–present	Scorpions	—N/a	—N/a	Esports
	Our Lady of Fatima University	Valenzuela	1973	2026–present	Phoenix	—N/a	—N/a	Esports
	University of Asia and the Pacific	Pasig	1967	2026–present	Dragons	—N/a	—N/a	Golf

==== Former schools ====
Colors	School	Location	Founded	Years Active	Notes
	Ateneo de Manila University	Quezon City	1859	1924–1978	Left in 1978, immediately joined the UAAP.
	De La Salle University	Manila	1911	1924–1981	Left in 1981, joined the UAAP in 1986.
	Far Eastern University	Manila	1919 (as Far Eastern College)	1924–1936	Left in 1936, co-founded the UAAP in 1938.
	National University	Manila	1900	1924–1936	Left in 1936, co-founded the UAAP in 1938.
	University of Manila	Manila	1913	1924–1926	Left in 1936, joined the UAAP from 1952 to 1954.
	University of the Philippines Manila	Manila	1908	1924–1936	Left in 1936, co-founded the UAAP in 1938.
	University of Santo Tomas	Manila	1611	1924–1936	Left in 1936, co-founded the UAAP in 1938.
	St. Vincent de Paul College	Manila		1925–1926	Left in 1926.
	Trinity University of Asia	Quezon City	1963	1974–1986	Dropped from the league in 1986.
	Philippine Christian University	Manila	1946	1996–2009	Left the league in 2009, joined the NAASCU in 2014.

=== UAAP ===
==== Current schools ====
Colors	School	Location	Founded	Joined	Type	Collegiate Division		High School Division	
Colors	School	Location	Founded	Joined	Type	Men	Women	Boys	Girls
	Adamson University	Manila	1932	1952–1953, 1970– (Note: Adamson first joined the UAAP in 1952 and stayed for one season.)	Private (Vincentian)	Soaring Falcons	Lady Falcons	Baby Falcons	Lady Baby Falcons
	Ateneo de Manila University	Quezon City	1859	1978	Private (Jesuit)	Blue Eagles			
	De La Salle University	Manila	1911	1986	Private (Lasallian)	Green Archers	Lady Archers	Junior Archers	Lady Junior Archers
	De La Salle Santiago Zobel School	Muntinlupa	1911	1986	Private (Lasallian)	Green Archers	Lady Archers	Junior Archers	Lady Junior Archers
	Far Eastern University	Manila (Note: University has several campuses, of which the one in Manila is the flagship.)	1928	1938	Private	Tamaraws	Lady Tamaraws	Baby Tamaraws	Lady Baby Tamaraws
	Far Eastern University–Diliman	Quezon City	1928	2005 (Note: The defunct FEU Boys High School and FEU Girls High School represented FEU in the Juniors division before 2005. The two high schools were established in 1933.)	Private	Tamaraws	Lady Tamaraws	Baby Tamaraws	Lady Baby Tamaraws
	National University	Manila	1900	1938	Private	Bulldogs	Lady Bulldogs	Bullpups	Lady Bullpups
	National University Nazareth School	Manila	1900	2005	Private	Bulldogs	Lady Bulldogs	Bullpups	Lady Bullpups
	University of the East	Multiple	1946	1952	Private	Red Warriors	Lady Warriors	Junior Warriors	Lady Junior Warriors
	University of the Philippines	Quezon City	1908	1938	Public	Fighting Maroons		Junior Fighting Maroons	
	University of the Philippines Integrated School	Quezon City	1908	1938	Public	Fighting Maroons		Junior Fighting Maroons	
	University of Santo Tomas	Manila	1611	1938	Private (Dominican)	Growling Tigers	Tigresses	Tiger Cubs	Tigress Cubs

==== Guest schools ====
Since UAAP Season 87, the league has signed memorandums of agreement for notable high school programs to join various events as guest teams. The Southridge Admirals have participated in five events since 2025, namely boys' football, swimming, baseball, tennis, and fencing, while the Claret Red Roosters rounded out the participating schools in boys' football.

Colors	School	Location	Founded	Years Active	High School Division	Guest Membership
Colors	School	Location	Founded	Years Active	Boys	Guest Membership
	Claret School of Quezon City	Quezon City	1967	2025–present	Red Roosters	Boys' football
	PAREF Southridge School	Muntinlupa	1979	2025–present	Admirals	Boys' swimming, baseball, football, tennis, and fencing

==== Former schools ====
Colors	School	Location	Founded	Years Active	Notes
	Manila Central University	Manila	1904	1952–1962	Left in 1962, joined the UCAL in 2023.
	University of Manila	Manila	1913	1952–1954	Dropped from the league in 1954, joined the NAASCU from 2001 to 2012.

=== NCRAA ===
==== Current schools ====
Colors	School	Location	Founded	Type	Nickname
	Asian Institute of Maritime Studies	Pasay	1993	Private	Blue Sharks
	Bestlink College of the Philippines	Quezon City	2002	Private	Kalasag
	De La Salle University – Dasmariñas	Dasmariñas	1987	Private (Lasallian)	Patriots
	Emilio Aguinaldo College – Cavite	Dasmariñas	1973	Private	Vanguards
	Immaculada Concepcion College	Caloocan	1984	Private	Blue Hawks
	Lyceum of the Philippines University – Laguna	Calamba	2000	Private	Pirates
	Olivarez College	Parañaque	1976	Private	Sea Lions
	PATTS College of Aeronautics	Parañaque	1969	Private	Seahorses
	Philippine Merchant Marine School	Las Piñas	1950	Private	Mariners
	University of Luzon	Dagupan	1948	Private	Golden Tigers

=== NAASCU ===
==== Current schools ====
Colors	School	Location	Founded	Type	Nickname
	AMA University	Quezon City	1980	Private	Kings
	Arandia College	Parañaque	1999	Private	Rhinos
	City University of Pasay	Pasay	1994	Public	Green Eagles
	Enderun Colleges	Taguig	2005	Private	Titans
	Holy Angel University	Angeles City	1933	Private	Flyers
	Manuel L. Quezon University	Manila	1947	Private	Stallions
	New Era University	Quezon City	1975	Private (Iglesia ni Cristo)	Hunters
	Our Lady of Fatima University	Valenzuela	1973	Private	Phoenix
	Philippine Christian University	Manila	1946	Private (Methodist)	Dolphins
	Sacred Heart Academy of Novaliches	Quezon City	1971	Private	Bruins
	St. Clare College of Caloocan	Caloocan	1995	Private	Saints
	University of Makati	Taguig (Note: Since 2023, the University of Makati is located in Taguig but is under the ownership of the City Government of Makati.)	1972	Public	Herons

=== ISAA ===
==== Current schools ====
Colors	School	Location	Founded	Type	Nickname
	Air Link International Aviation College	Pasay	1984	Private	Blazing Phoenix
	FEATI University	Manila	1946	Private	Seahawks
	ICCT Colleges Foundation, Inc.	Cainta	1992	Private	Blue Dragons
	La Consolacion College Manila	Manila	1902	Private (Augustinian Sisters)	Blue Royals
	Manila Adventist College	Pasay	1993	Private (Adventist)	Soaring Angels
	Manila Tytana Colleges	Pasay	1975	Private	Titans
	PATTS College of Aeronautics	Parañaque	1969	Private	Seahorses
	Philippine Women's University	Manila	1919	Private	Patriots
	St. Dominic College of Asia	Bacoor	2003	Private	Pikemen
	Treston International College	Taguig	2009	Private	Golden Lions
	Trinity University of Asia	Taguig	1963	Private (Episcopal)	Stallions
	University of Asia and the Pacific	Pasig	1967	Private	Dragons
	WCC Aeronautical & Technological College	Caloocan	2008	Private	Skyhawks

=== UCAL ===
==== Current schools ====
Colors	School	Location	Founded	Joined	Type	Nickname
	Centro Escolar University	Manila	1907	2016	Private	Scorpions
	Diliman College	Quezon City	1998	2016	Private	Blue Dragons
	Immaculada Concepcion College	Caloocan	1984	2024	Private	Blue Hawks
	Lyceum of the Philippines University – Batangas	Batangas City	1966	2017	Private	Pirates
	Manila Central University	Caloocan	1904	2023	Private	Supremos
	Olivarez College	Parañaque	1976	2016	Private	Sea Lions
	Philippine Christian University – Dasmariñas	Dasmariñas	1945	2018	Private (Methodist)	Dolphins
	Philippine Women's University	Manila	1919	2023	Private	Patriots
	University of Batangas	Batangas City	1946	2016	Private	Brahmans

== Visayas ==
=== CESAFI ===
==== Current schools ====
Colors	School	Location	Founded	Joined	Type	Collegiate Division		High School Division	
Colors	School	Location	Founded	Joined	Type	Men	Women	Boys	Girls
	Benedicto College	Mandaue	2000		Private	Cheetahs	—N/a	Baby Cheetahs	—N/a
	Cebu Doctors' University	Mandaue	1973		Private	White Stallions			
	Cebu Eastern College	Cebu City	1915		Private	Dragons	—N/a	Baby Dragons	—N/a
	Cebu Institute of Technology – University	Cebu City	1946		Private	Wildcats	—N/a	Wildkittens	—N/a
	Cebu Roosevelt Memorial Colleges	Bogo	1947		Private	Mustangs	—N/a	Baby Mustangs	—N/a
	Don Bosco Technical College–Cebu	Cebu City	1947		Private (Salesian)	Greywolves	—N/a	Baby Greywolves	—N/a
	Felipe R. Verallo Foundation College	Bogo	1988		Private	Blue Dragons	—N/a	—N/a	—N/a
	Sacred Heart School – Ateneo de Cebu	Mandaue	1955		Private (Jesuit)	—N/a	—N/a	Magis Eagles	
	San Roque College De Cebu	Liloan	1992		Private	—N/a	—N/a	Greyhounds	
	Southwestern University PHINMA	Cebu City	1946		Private	Cobras	—N/a	Baby Cobras	—N/a
	University of Cebu	Cebu City	1964		Private	Webmasters	—N/a	Junior Webmasters	—N/a
	University of Cebu – Lapu-Lapu & Mandaue Campus	Mandaue	1995		Private	Webmasters	—N/a	Junior Webmasters	—N/a
	University of San Carlos	Cebu City	1595		Private (Verbites)	Warriors	—N/a	Baby Warriors	—N/a
	University of San Jose–Recoletos	Cebu City	1947		Private (Augustinian Recollect)	Jaguars	—N/a	Baby Jaguars	—N/a
	University of Southern Philippines Foundation	Cebu City	1927		Private	Panthers	—N/a	Baby Panthers	—N/a
	University of the Philippines Cebu	Cebu City	1918		Public	Fighting Maroons		Junior Fighting Maroons	
	University of the Visayas	Cebu City	1919		Private	Green Lancers	—N/a	Baby Lancers	—N/a
	Velez College	Cebu City	1966		Private	Velezians			
