= 2018 PCCL National Collegiate Championship =

Men's Finals	G1	Wins
Ateneo Blue Eagles	95	1
UV Green Lancers	71	0
- Duration: January 26, 2019
- Arena(s): Filoil Flying V Centre
- Finals MVP: Isaac Go
- Winning coach: Tab Baldwin
- TV network(s): ESPN 5

The 2018 PCCL National Collegiate Championship is the tenth edition of the Philippine Collegiate Champions League (PCCL) in its current incarnation, the postseason tournament to determine the national collegiate champions in basketball. The tournament will be the 15th edition overall.

== Tournament format ==
The tournament format was unveiled in November 2018.

- Qualifying round
  - NCR qualifiers
    - 2 teams from the UAAP
    - 2 teams from the NCAA
    - NAASCU champion
    - ISAA champion
  - North/Central Luzon qualifiers
  - South Luzon/Bicol qualifiers
  - Visayas qualifiers
  - Mindanao qualifiers
- Regional round
  - Luzon-NCR championship
    - North/Central Luzon qualifier
    - South Luzon/Bicol qualifier
    - NCR qualifier
  - VisMin championship
    - CESAFI champion
    - Visayas qualifier
    - Mindanao qualifier
- Final round
  - Group A: UAAP champion vs NCAA champion (best-of-three)
  - Group B: Luzon/NCR champion vs. VisMin champion (best-of-three)
  - Championship Game: Group A vs. Group B

== Qualified teams ==
=== Qualifying round ===
==== NCR ====
School	Team	League	City/Town
Colegio de San Juan de Letran	Letran Knights	NCAA	Manila
La Consolacion College Manila	La Consalacion Blue Royals	ISAA	Manila
University of Perpetual Help System DALTA	Perpetual Altas	NCAA	Las Piñas
St. Clare College of Caloocan	St. Clare Saints	NAASCU	Caloocan
Lyceum of the Philippines University	Lyceum Pirates	NCAA	Manila
National University	NU Bulldogs	UAAP	Manila

==== North/Central Luzon ====
School	Team	League	City/Town
Isabela Colleges	IC Maroons	PRISAA Isabela	Cauayan
Don Mariano Marcos Memorial State University	DMMMSU Stallions	SCUAA Region I	Bacnotan
University of Northern Philippines	UNP Sharks	SCUAA Region I	Vigan
Mary the Queen College (Pampanga), Inc.	MQC Legionnaires	UCAAP	Guagua
Don Honorio Ventura Technological State University	DHVTSU Wildcats	UCAAP	Bacolor

==== South Luzon/Bicol ====
School	Team	League	City/Town
University of Batangas	UB Brahmans	USCAA	Batangas City
Naga College Foundation	NCF Tigers	BUCAL	Naga
De La Salle Lipa	DLSL Green Stallions	NCAA South	Lipa
Calayan Educational Foundation	CEFI Cougars	PRISAA Quezon	Lucena
University of Nueva Caceres	UNC Greyhounds	BUCAL	Naga
St. Dominic College of Asia	SDCA Red Pikes	ISAA	Bacoor
Annunciation College of Bacon Sorsogon Unit, Inc.	ACBSUI Panthers	BICCS	Sorsogon City

==== Visayas ====
School	Team	League	City/Town
Colegio de Sta. Ana de Victorias	CSA-V Titans	NOPSSCEA	Victorias
Iloilo Doctors' College	IDC Doctors	ILOPRISAA	Iloilo City

==== Mindanao ====
School	Team	League	City/Town
Holy Cross of Davao College	HCDC Crusaders	Gaisano Grand Cup	Davao City
Holy Trinity College of General Santos City	HTC Wildcats	GenSan PRISAA	General Santos
Professional World Academy, Misamis	PWA Blue Marlins	HNH President's Cup	Cagayan de Oro
Southern City Colleges	SCC Bulldogs	PSZCAA	Zamboanga City

=== Regional round ===
School	Team	League	City/Town
University of the Visayas	UV Green Lancers	CESAFI	Cebu City

=== Finals ===
School	Team	League	City/Town
San Beda University	San Beda Red Lions	NCAA	Manila
Ateneo de Manila University	Ateneo Blue Eagles	UAAP	Quezon City

== Qualifying rounds ==
=== Visayas qualifier ===
The knockout game between the Iloilo champion Iloilo Doctors' College and Negros Occidental champions Colegio de Santa Ana de Victorias was held at the STI West Negros University Gym in Bacolod on November 8.

November 8
1:00 p.m.

CSA-V Titans	102–82	IDC Doctors

STI West Negros University Gym, Bacolod

CSA-V's decisive 17–0 run at the start of the third quarter sealed the win for the Titans. They qualify to the Davao regionals.

=== North Luzon qualifiers ===
Pos	Team	W	L	PCT	GB	Qualification
1	DHVTSU Wildcats	4	0	1.000	—	Advance to Luzon regionals
2	MQC Legionnaires	3	1	.750	1	
3	UNP Sharks	2	2	.500	2	
4	DMMMSU Stallions	1	3	.250	3	
5	IC Maroons	0	4	.000	4	

Source: CollegiateChampionsLeague.net
Rules for classification: 1) winning percentage; 2) head-to-head record; 3) head-to-head point differential; 4) overall point differential

November 22

UNP Sharks	97–46	IC Maroons

Bren Z. Guiao Convention Center, San Fernando, Pampanga

November 22

DHVTSU Wildcats	73–64	MQC Legionnaires

Bren Z. Guiao Convention Center, San Fernando, Pampanga

November 22

IC Maroons	67–109	DHVTSU Wildcats

Bren Z. Guiao Convention Center, San Fernando, Pampanga

November 22

MQC Legionnaires	89–72	DMMMSU Stallions

Bren Z. Guiao Convention Center, San Fernando, Pampanga

November 23

DMMMSU Stallions	143–40	IC Maroons

Bren Z. Guiao Convention Center, San Fernando, Pampanga

November 23

DHVTSU Wildcats	73–71	UNP Sharks

Bren Z. Guiao Convention Center, San Fernando, Pampanga

November 23

UNP Sharks	143–40	IC Maroons

Bren Z. Guiao Convention Center, San Fernando, Pampanga

November 23

IC Maroons	28–146	MQC Legionnaires

Bren Z. Guiao Convention Center, San Fernando, Pampanga

November 24

DHVTSU Wildcats	83–75	DMMMSU Stallions

Bren Z. Guiao Convention Center, San Fernando, Pampanga

November 24

MQC Legionnaires	105–85	UNP Sharks

Bren Z. Guiao Convention Center, San Fernando, Pampanga

=== NCR qualifiers ===
The NCR (Metro Manila) qualifiers were held from November 22 to 24 at the La Consolacion College - Manila and Lyceum of the Philippines University gyms in Manila.

Round 1
Letran	80
La Consolacion	70
Saint Clare	67
Perpetual	69

Semifinals
Lyceum	55
Letran	74
NU	65
Perpetual	78

Final
Letran	83
Perpetual	77

==== Round 1 ====
November 22
9:00 a.m.

Letran Knights	80–70	La Consolacion Blue Royals

La Consolacion College - Manila Gym, Manila

November 22
11:00 a.m.

Perpetual Altas	69–67	Saint Clare Saints

La Consolacion College - Manila Gym, Manila

==== Semifinals ====
November 23
9:15 a.m.

Perpetual Altas	78–65	NU Bulldogs

Lyceum of the Philippines University Gym, Manila

November 23
11:15 a.m.

Letran Knights	74–55	Lyceum Pirates

Lyceum of the Philippines University Gym, Manila

==== Final ====
November 24
10:00 a.m.

Perpetual Altas	77–83	Letran Knights

Lyceum of the Philippines University Gym, Manila

=== South Luzon/Bicol qualifiers ===
The South Luzon/Bicol qualifiers shall take place at the Jesse M. Robredo Coliseum in Naga, Camarines Sur from November 27 to December 1.

==== Elimination round ====
===== Group A =====
Pos	Team	W	L	PCT	GB	Qualification
1	UB Brahmans	2	0	1.000	—	Advance to semifinals
2	SDCA Red Pikes	1	1	.500	1	Advance to semifinals
3	UNC Greyhounds	0	2	.000	2	

Source: collegiatechampionsleague.net
Rules for classification: 1) winning percentage; 2) head-to-head record; 3) head-to-head point differential; 4) overall point differential

November 27
9:00 a.m.

UNC Greyhounds	73–82	SDCA Red Pikes

Jesse M. Robredo Coliseum, Naga

November 28
8:00 a.m.

SDCA Red Pikes	80–85	UB Brahmans

Jesse M. Robredo Coliseum, Naga

November 28
2:30 p.m.

UB Brahmans	70–61	UNC Greyhounds

Jesse M. Robredo Coliseum, Naga

===== Group B =====
Pos	Team	W	L	PCT	GB	Qualification
1	NCF Tigers	3	0	1.000	—	Advance to semifinals
2	CEFI Cougars	2	1	.667	1	Advance to semifinals
3	ACBSUI Panthers	1	2	.333	2	
4	DLSL Green Stallions	0	3	.000	3	

Source: collegiatechampionsleague.net
Rules for classification: 1) winning percentage; 2) head-to-head record; 3) head-to-head point differential; 4) overall point differential

November 27
10:30 a.m.

NCF Tigers	66–92	CEFI Cougars

Jesse M. Robredo Coliseum, Naga

November 27
12:00 p.m.

ACBSUI Panthers	67–66	DLSL Green Stallions

Jesse M. Robredo Coliseum, Naga

November 28
9:30 a.m.

CEFI Cougars	99–76	DLSL Green Stallions

Jesse M. Robredo Coliseum, Naga

November 28
11:00 a.m.

ACBSUI Panthers	50–84	NCF Tigers

Jesse M. Robredo Coliseum, Naga

November 28
4:15 p.m.

DLSL Green Stallions	65–79	NCF Tigers

Jesse M. Robredo Coliseum, Naga

November 28
5:30 p.m.

CEFI Cougars	91–88	ACBSUI Panthers

Jesse M. Robredo Coliseum, Naga

==== Bracket ====
Semifinals
A1	UB	84
B2	CEFI	70
B1	NCF	82
A2	SDCA	63

Final
A1	UB	68
B1	NCF	84

==== Semifinals ====
November 29
9:00 a.m.

UB Brahmans	84–70	CEFI Cougars

Jesse M. Robredo Coliseum, Naga

November 29
10:30 a.m.

NCF Tigers	82–63	SDCA Red Pikes

Jesse M. Robredo Coliseum, Naga

==== Final ====
November 29
4:30 p.m.

UB Brahmans	68–84	NCF Tigers

Jesse M. Robredo Coliseum, Naga

=== Mindanao qualifiers ===
The Mindanao qualifiers is taking place at the Davao City Recreation Center from December 1 to 3.

==== Elimination round ====
Pos	Team	W	L	PCT	GB	Qualification
1	HTC Wildcats	3	0	1.000	—	Advance to qualifying final
2	HCDC Crusaders	2	1	.667	1	Advance to qualifying final
3	SCC Bulldogs	1	2	.333	2	
4	PWA Blue Marlins	0	3	.000	3	

Source: collegiatechampionsleague.net
Rules for classification: 1) winning percentage; 2) head-to-head record; 3) head-to-head point differential; 4) overall point differential

December 1
3:00 p.m.

HCDC Crusaders	74–76	HTC Wildcats

Davao City Recreation Center, Davao City

December 1
4:30 p.m.

SCC Bulldogs	106–91	PWA Blue Marlins

Davao City Recreation Center, Davao City

December 2
8:00 a.m.

HCDC Crusaders	81–61	PWA Blue Marlins

Davao City Recreation Center, Davao City

December 2
9:30 a.m.

HTC Wildcats	88–69	SCC Bulldogs

Davao City Recreation Center, Davao City

December 2
4:00 a.m.

HCDC Crusaders	84–68	SCC Bulldogs

Davao City Recreation Center, Davao City

December 2
5:30 p.m.

HTC Wildcats	73–59	PWA Blue Marlins

Davao City Recreation Center, Davao City

==== Final ====
December 3
4:00 p.m.

HTC Wildcats	79–78	HCDC Crusaders

Davao City Recreation Center, Davao City

== Regional rounds ==
- If no team won all elimination round games, a regional final shall be played between the #1 and #2 teams.

=== Luzon regional ===
Pos	Team	W	L	PCT	GB	Qualification
1	NCF Tigers	2	0	1.000	—	Advance to Philippine Regional Championship
2	Letran Knights	1	1	.500	1	
3	DHVTSU Wildcats	0	2	.000	2	

Source: collegiatechampionsleague.net
Rules for classification: 1) winning percentage; 2) head-to-head record; 3) head-to-head point differential; 4) overall point differential

November 29
7:00 p.m.

DHVTSU Wildcats	70–98	Letran Knights

Jesse M. Robredo Coliseum, Naga

November 30
5:30 p.m.

NCF Tigers	79–47	DHVTSU Wildcats

Jesse M. Robredo Coliseum, Naga

December 1
9:00 a.m.

Letran Knights	65–68	NCF Tigers

Jesse M. Robredo Coliseum, Naga

=== VisMin regional ===
The VisMin regional shall be held at the Arcadia Active Lifestyle Center in Davao City from December 4 to 5.

Pos	Team	W	L	PCT	GB	Qualification
1	UV Green Lancers	2	0	1.000	—	Advance to Philippine Regional Championship
2	CSA-V Titans	1	1	.500	1	
3	HTC Wildcats	0	2	.000	2	

Source: collegiatechampionsleague.net
Rules for classification: 1) winning percentage; 2) head-to-head record; 3) head-to-head point differential; 4) overall point differential

December 4
8:30 a.m.

HTC Wildcats	88–90	CSA-V Titans

Davao City Recreation Center, Davao City

December 4
1:30 p.m.

UV Green Lancers	114–73	HTC Wildcats

Davao City Recreation Center, Davao City

December 5
4:00 p.m.

UV Green Lancers	72–68	CSA-V Titans

Davao City Recreation Center, Davao City

== Final Four ==
Semifinals; Best-of-three
UAAP	Ateneo	2
NCAA	San Beda	1
Luzon	NCF	0
VisMin	UV	2

Final; One-game playoff
UAAP	Ateneo	95
VisMin	UV	71

=== Philippine Regional Championship ===
The Philippine Regional Championship was held at the Arcadia Active Lifestyle Center in Davao City from December 6 to 8.

December 6

UV Green Lancers	76–72	NCF Tigers

Arcadia Active Lifestyle Center, Davao City

December 7

UV Green Lancers	89–72	NCF Tigers
UV wins series 2–0

Arcadia Active Lifestyle Center, Davao City

==== Awards ====
- Most Valuable Player: Rey Anthony Suerte (University of Visayas)
- Mythical Five:
  - Emmanuel Ojuola (Naga College Foundation)
  - Josue Segumpan Jr. (University of Visayas)
  - Rey Anthony Suerte (University of Visayas)
  - Michael Heinrich Maestre (University of Visayas)
  - Gileant Delator (University of Visayas)

=== UAAP vs NCAA Showdown ===
January 21
4:00 p.m.

box score

Ateneo Blue Eagles	43–49	San Beda Red Lions

Filoil Flying V Centre, San Juan

January 24
4:00 p.m.

box score

Ateneo Blue Eagles	74–62	San Beda Red Lions

Ynares Sports Arena, Pasig

January 26
3:00 p.m.

box score

Ateneo Blue Eagles	62–56	San Beda Red Lions
Ateneo wins series 2–1

Ynares Sports Arena, Pasig

=== Finals ===
January 28
4:00 p.m.

box score

Ateneo Blue Eagles	95–71	UV Green Lancers

Filoil Flying V Centre, San Juan

==== Awards ====
- Most Valuable Player: George Isaac Go (Ateneo de Manila University)
- Mythical Five:
  - George Isaac Go (Ateneo de Manila University )
  - Bryan John Andrade (Ateneo de Manila University)
  - Rey Anthony Suerte (University of Visayas)
  - Ferdinand Ravena III (Ateneo de Manila University)
  - Bassier Sackor (University of Visayas)
