= JMRC =

JMRC may refer to:

- Jaipur Metro, an Indian rapid transit system partly owned by the Jaipur Metro Rail Corporation
- Jesse M. Robredo Coliseum, a public sports arena in Camarines Sur, Philippines
- Journal of Medieval Religious Cultures, an academic journal
