= MAMC =

MAMC may refer to:

- Madigan Army Medical Center, by Tacoma, Washington, USA
- Maharaja Agrasen Medical College, Agroha, medical college in Agroha, India
- Manila Adventist College, Christian tertiary health sciences institution in Manila, Philippines
- Maulana Azad Medical College, government medical college in Delhi, India
- Monsters Ate My Condo, video game
- Musée d'art moderne et contemporain de Saint-Étienne, museum in Saint-Étienne, France
- Myanmar Army Medical Corps, corps that provides medical services to Myanmar army personnel and their families
