= Manila Doctors Hospital =

Private hospital in Manila, Philippines

- Manila Medical Services, Inc.

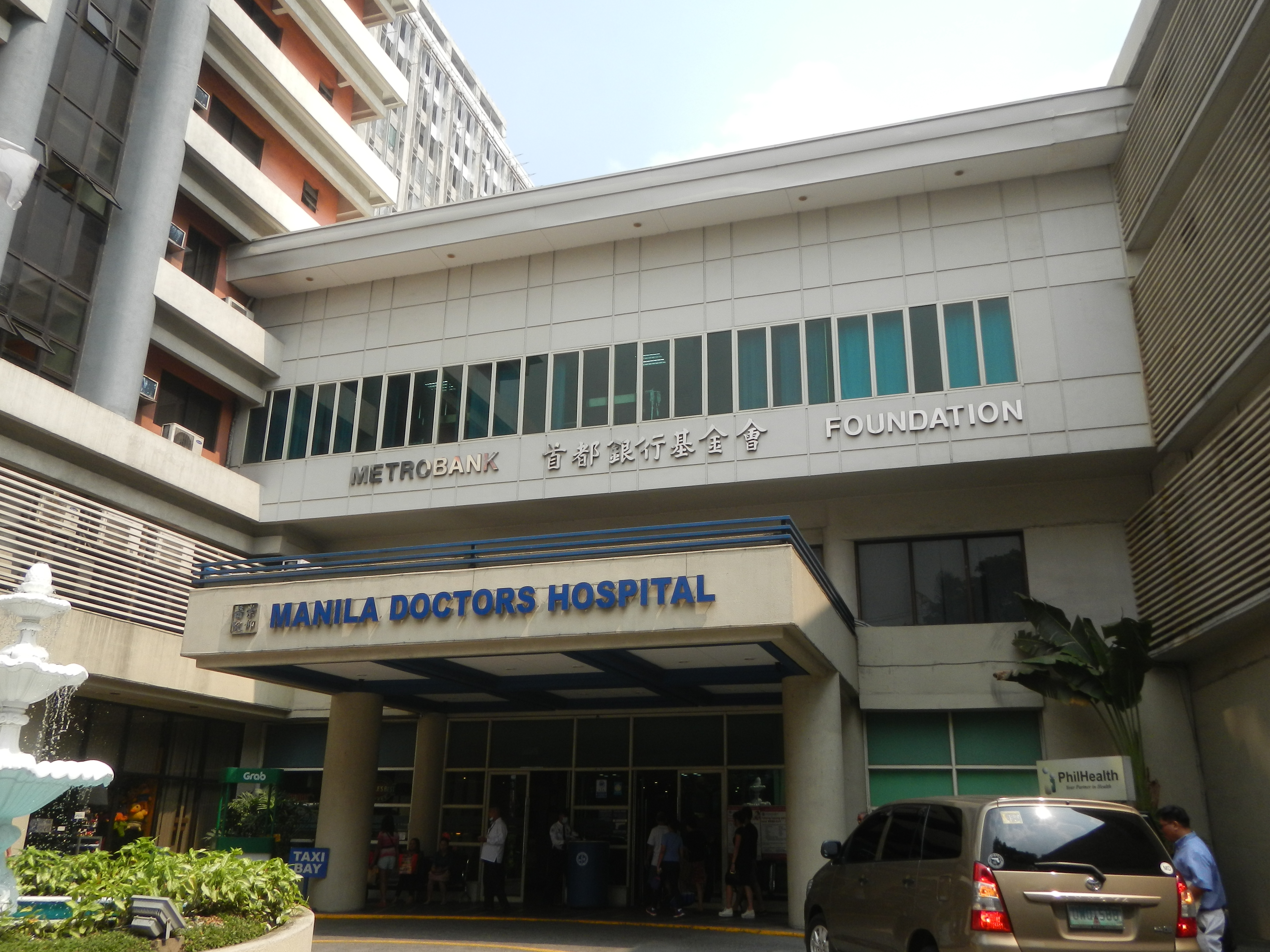
- The entrance along United Nations Avenue in 2016

Geography
- Location: 667 United Nations Avenue, Ermita, Manila, 1000 Metro Manila, Philippines
- Coordinates: 14°34′55″N 120°58′51″E

Organization
- Care system: Maxicare
- Type: Specialist
- Affiliated university: Manila Tytana Colleges (formerly Manila Doctors College)

Services
- Emergency department: Yes
- Beds: 300 - 500

Helipads
- Helipad: No

History
- Founded: December 3, 1956; 69 years ago

Links
- Website: maniladoctors.com.ph

Manila Doctors Hospital (MDH), simply referred to as Manila Doctors or MaDocs, is a tertiary hospital located in Ermita, Manila, Philippines with over 500 beds. It was founded in the City of Manila in 1956 by the group of doctors. The hospital is currently owned by the Manila Medical Services, Inc. and the Metrobank Foundation. It provides services for physical examination, cardiovascular check, and oncology unit. George S.K. Ty is the current honorary chairman of Manila Doctors Hospital.

The hospital slogan is With you every step of the way. Previously, it was World Class Care Within Your Reach.

== History ==
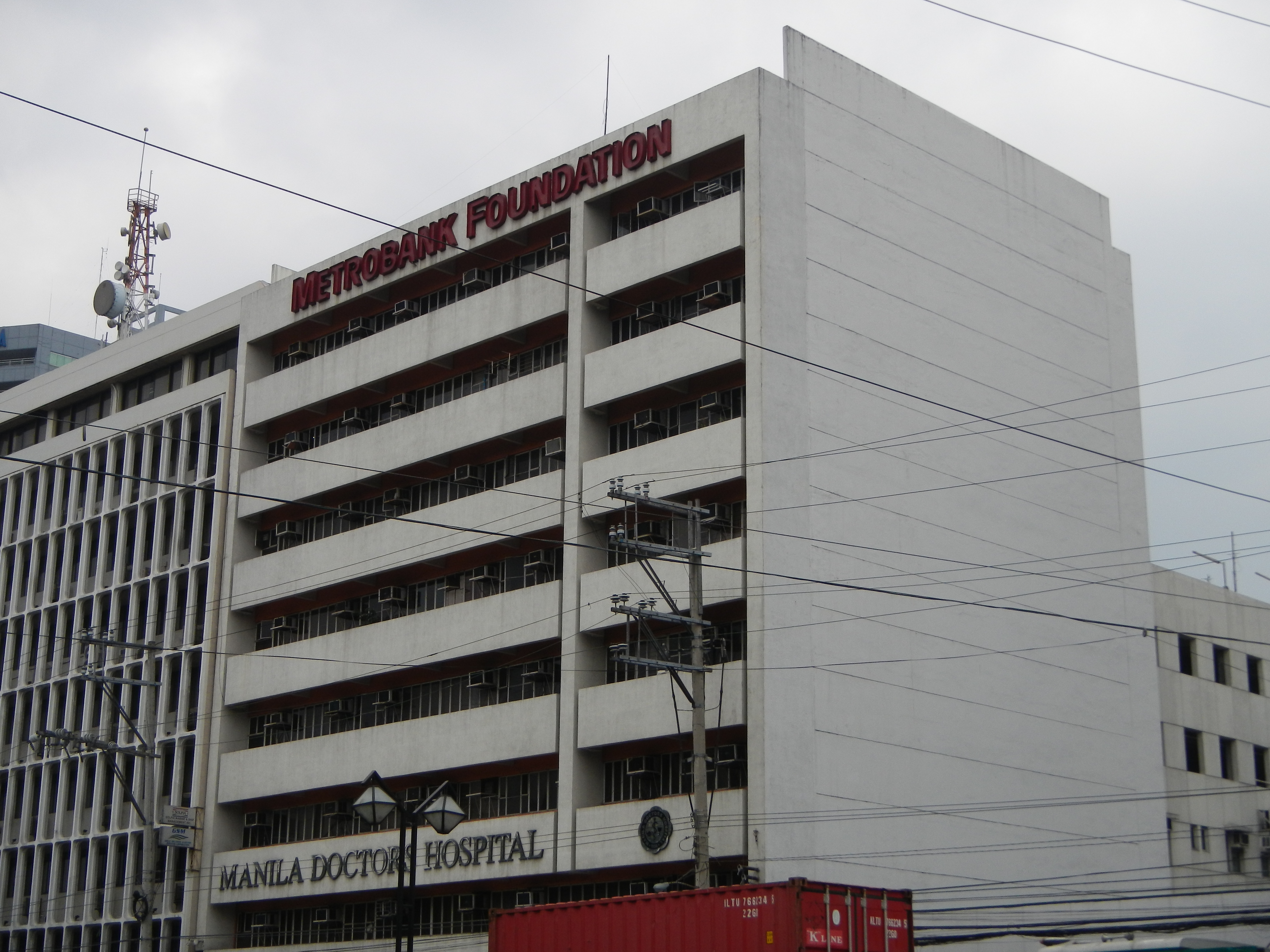
The facade of Doña Salustiana Medical Tower along Kalaw Avenue in 2014 prior to its renovation in 2015 along with the construction of the Norberto Ty Medical Tower.

The hospital was founded on December 3, 1956 by a group of 14 doctors, in a 5-storey building which was converted into a hospital complex in an 8-storey Doña Salustiana Medical Tower.

In December 1975, during the 19th anniversary celebration of Manila Doctors Hospital, MDH opened its affiliated campus, known as the Manila Doctors Hospital School of Nursing (then Manila Doctors College, now Manila Tytana Colleges), its campus was originally located at the fourth floor of Manila Doctors Hospital, before it was relocated to Pasay along Macapagal Boulevard in 2004.

On February 27, 1979, the Metrobank Group became the major stockholder of Manila Medical Services, Inc.

In 2005, The hospital received its ISO 9001:2000 Certification from the International Organization for Standardization and it has been updated to ISO 9001:2008 in 2011.

In December 2015, the Metro Pacific Investments Corporation purchased a total of 388,932 common shares of stock in Manila Medical Services, Inc.

On December 8, 2016, the hospital opened its new medical tower, the Norberto Ty Medical Tower (NTMT; now the Dr. George S.K. Ty Medical Tower), its new 18-floored tower along Kalaw Avenue, in celebration of the hospital's 60th anniversary. MDH continually developed its entire support and medical departments to become one of the top five hospitals in Metro Manila. In 2017, the hospital acquired its new building with approximately 500 beds and more clinic rooms and doctors. The hospital also added more medical and diagnostic services, such as one stop shop wellness hub, vascular clinic and radiation oncology center which houses the most advanced cancer treatment – the Linear Accelerator (LINAC) and Brachytherapy, as well as several new restaurants on the building itself.

On January 31, 2020, the hospital opened a temporary quarantine area for patients during the COVID-19 pandemic in the country.

The hospital's emergency room along United Nations Avenue underwent renovations from June to August 2021.

In January 2026, the hospital's facade along United Nations Avenue has been renovated.

== See also ==
- List of hospitals in Metro Manila
- Manila Tytana Colleges
- Metrobank Foundation
