= Inter-Scholastic Athletic Association =

Philippine sports organization

- Upcoming season or competition: ISAA Season 18
- Founded: 2009
- Motto: Infinite Legacy (Season 18)
- No. of teams: 12 teams
- Country: Philippines
- Venues: Mall of Asia Arena, Cuneta Astrodome, Filoil EcoOil Centre, La Consolacion College Manila (Basketball), Manila Adventist College (Volleyball), Manila Tytana Colleges (Basketball & Volleyball), PATTS College of Aeronautics (Basketball & Volleyball), Treston International College (Basketball)

Inter-Scholastic Athletic Association or ISAA is an athletic sport organization in the Philippines formed in 2009 by Lyceum of the Philippines University. The Lyceum of the Philippines University started the process of formation of the league when the institution announced its intention to form a collegiate athletic association in 2004.

== List of members ==
- Air Link International Aviation College – The Blazing Phoenix
- FEATI University – FEATI Seahawks
- ICCT Colleges Foundation, Inc. – ICCT Blue Dragons
- La Consolacion College Manila – LCCM Blue Royals
- Manila Adventist College – MAC Soaring Angels
- Manila Tytana Colleges – MTC Titans
- PATTS College of Aeronautics – PATTS Sea Horses
- Philippine Women's University – PWU Patriots
- St. Dominic College of Asia – Dominican Pikemen
- Treston International College – Treston Golden Lions
- University of Asia and the Pacific – UA&P Dragons
- WCC Aeronautical & Technological College – WCC Skyhawks

== Inactive Members ==
- Trinity University of Asia – TUA Stallions
- Taguig City University – TCU Catfish
- FEU - East Asia College – iTamaraws
- University of Perpetual Help DALTA Molino – Perpetual Molino Altas

== Sports ==
- Basketball
- Volleyball
- Table Tennis
- Swimming
- Badminton
- Bowling
- Futsal
- Chess

== See also ==
- University Athletic Association of the Philippines
- National Collegiate Athletic Association (Philippines)
- Philippine Collegiate Champions League
