= Air Link International Aviation College =

Private college in Pasay, Philippines

- Former names: Amurao Flying School (1982–1984); Air Link International Aviation School (1984–2003)
- Motto: Aim High, Fly High
- Type: Private, Aviation School
- Established: October 1984; 42 years ago
- Founder: Capt. Geronimo Amurao
- Affiliations: CHED; CAAP; TESDA; PRC
- President: Gomeriano Amurao
- Academic staff: 60
- Administrative staff: 30
- Students: 2500
- Location: Domestic Airport Road, Pasay, Metro Manila, Philippines: Main Campus; Lubang, Occidental Mindoro, Philippines: Geronimo Amurao Campus - Lubang Facility; 14°31′14″N 121°0′5″E
- Campus: Urban, 13,500 sqm
- Colors: Yellow and Red
- Nickname: The Blazing Phoenix
- Sporting affiliations: ISAA
- Website: aliac.edu.ph
- Location in Metro Manila Location in Luzon Location in the Philippines

Air Link International Aviation College (ALIAC), commonly known as Air Link, is a private institution specializing in aviation education. It is situated within the General Aviation Area of Domestic Airport in Pasay, Metro Manila, Philippines.

The primary campus is equipped with 28 aircraft, including both single and twin-engined models. Additionally, it features a hangar located adjacent to a classroom building.

ALIAC also operates a secondary campus on the island of Lubang in Occidental Mindoro. This campus provides facilities for intensive training for aspiring pilots and ground-based students.

== History ==
ALIAC traces its origins back to 1982 when Captain Geronimo Amurao, a pilot with Philippine Airlines, founded a modest flying school known as the "Amurao Flying School". By 1984, under the leadership of Captain Amurao and with the valuable contributions of his spouse, Dr. Myrna Tan Vallecer-Amurao, this small aviation institution expanded and evolved into the "Air Link International Aviation School".

In April 2003, the institution underwent a name revision, officially becoming the "Air Link International Aviation College". Notably, in 2017, Atty. Gomeriano V. Amurao assumed the role of the new Managing Chairman and President of ALIAC.

== Academic programs ==
ALIAC's academic programs have received recognition and accreditation from both the Commission on Higher Education (CHED) and the Technical Education and Skills Development Authority (TESDA). Moreover, the Civil Aviation Authority of the Philippines (CAAP) has granted certification designating ALIAC as an Approved Training Organization for both Flight Training and Aircraft Maintenance.

The college provides students with hands-on experience, offering access to aircraft frames and power plants within specialized laboratories. Importantly, these facilities are supervised directly by licensed personnel, ensuring that students receive comprehensive practical training in dismantling and assembling aircraft components.
