= PATTS College of Aeronautics =

Private college in Parañaque, Philippines

- PATTS Dalubhasaan ng Eronotika (Filipino)
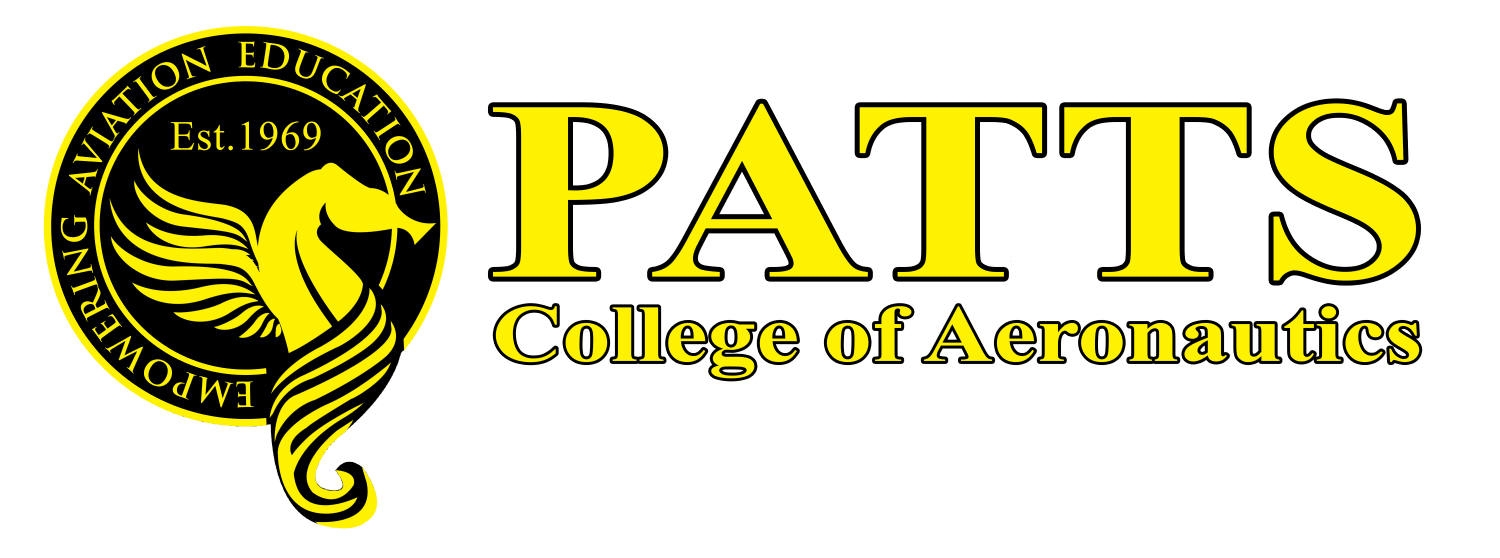
- PATTS Golden Jubilee Logo, 2019
- Former name: PATS School of Aeronautics
- Motto: Where Dreams take Flight
- Type: Private
- Established: 1969; 57 years ago
- Affiliations: SAEP, CHED, TESDA, PRC, CAAP, NCRAA,
- Chairman: Atty. Ambrosio V. Valdez Jr.
- President: Engr. Jose Eduardo S. Valdez
- Vice-president: Atty. Mercedes S. Gatmaytan (Senior Vice President); Atty. Anna Katrina V. Cruz (VP for Administrative Affairs); Dr. Emelita I. Javier (VP for Student Affairs); Engr. Joy Cosme G. Amores Jr. (VP for Academic Affairs)
- Founder: Atty. Ambrosio R. Valdez Sr.
- Academic staff: approx. 150
- Administrative staff: approx. 70
- Students: approx. 6600 as of first semester 2014–2015
- Location: Lombos Avenue, San Isidro, Parañaque, Metro Manila, Philippines; 14°28′29.02″N 121°0′22.47″E
- Campus: Main Campus [Urban] (Parañaque, Metro Manila) – 15,000 m^{2} (160,000 sq ft); Other External Campuses and Lands; Hotel Monticello [Off-campus Affiliate] (Tagaytay, Cavite) – 6,000 m^{2} (65,000 sq ft)
- Publications: Contrails (yearbook); Aeroscope (magazine)
- Colors: Royal Blue and Yellow
- Nickname: Seahorses
- Sporting affiliations: UCLAA, ISAA
- Student moniker: Pattsean (English), Pattsino (Filipino)
- Website: www.patts.edu.ph
- Location in Metro Manila Location in Luzon Location in the Philippines

PATTS College of Aeronautics (PATTS; Filipino: PATTS Dalubhasaan ng Eronotika), officially the Philippine Air Transport and Training Services, is a private aviation college in Parañaque, Metro Manila, Philippines. Founded in 1969 by Filipino lawyer Atty. Ambrosio R. Valdez Sr., the institution specializes in aeronautical sciences and air transportation engineering. The institution is recognized as an Aircraft Maintenance School by the Civil Aviation Authority of the Philippines (CAAP) and its academic programs are accredited by the Commission on Higher Education (CHED).

Originally established at the Domestic Airport Road in Pasay with the primary intent of operating a trainer aircraft manufacturing plant, the founders pivoted to organizing an aircraft engineering and technical training academy due to the economic climate of the era. The school was officially granted full college status in 1989. To accommodate its growing student population, PATTS relocated in April 2005 to its current, multi-hectare campus on Lombos Avenue in Parañaque, situated near the Ninoy Aquino International Airport. The college offers various aviation-centric degree programs, housing specialized flight simulation labs, an airframe and powerplant hangar, and a dedicated review program where its graduates regularly top the Professional Regulation Commission (PRC) nationwide board examinations for aeronautical engineers.

== History ==
=== Founding and Early Years ===
Founded as a joint enterprise of Filipino and American pioneers in aviation, the Philippine Air Transport and Training Services (PATTS) started operations in 1969. The primary objective of the founders was to establish a manufacturing and assembly plant for trainer aircraft. However, due to the unfavorable economic and investment climate of the era, the founders pivoted to their secondary objective: organizing and operating an aircraft engineering and maintenance academy to provide professional and technical training.

The school, initially operating as the PATTS School of Aeronautics, began by offering vocational courses, including one-year and two-year programs in airframe and powerplant mechanics. In its second year of operations, the institution expanded its curricular offerings to include a two-year avionics communication course and a four-year bachelor's degree program in aeronautical engineering.

=== Board Examinations and College Status ===
In 1983, graduates from the school's Bachelor of Science in Aeronautical Engineering program began participating in the newly established Professional Regulation Commission (PRC) Licensure Board Examination for Aeronautical Engineers, with several alumni placing within the nationwide top ten results. Graduates have regularly secured top ranks in national iterations, including securing first place nationwide in the 2019 and 2025 examinations alongside multiple top-ten finishes across the 2020s.

Due to its expanding academic curriculum and standard of instruction, the institution was officially granted full college status by the national government in 1989, transitioning its name to PATTS College of Aeronautics and adopting the institutional slogan "Fly high, your future is in the skies."

=== 2005 Relocation and Academic Diversification ===
In April 2005, coinciding with its 36th anniversary, the institution underwent a significant physical transition by relocating from its legacy site along Domestic Airport Road in Pasay City to a purpose-built, multi-hectare campus on Lombos Avenue, San Isidro, Parañaque. Following the relocation, the board of directors expanded the college's curriculum into non-aviation-centric industries to meet shifting market demands, beginning with the introduction of a Bachelor of Science in Hotel and Restaurant Management during the 2005–2006 academic year.

=== Recent History and Modern Milestones ===
In 2019, PATTS marked its 50th founding anniversary (Golden Jubilee), commemorating its history in Philippine aviation education.

During the mid-2020s, the college secured several corporate and international training partnerships. In September 2024, the college established a Flight Simulation Center on its Parañaque campus in partnership with the First Aviation Academy (FAA), integrating a RedBird flight simulator into its training modules.

The institution expanded its international career tracks in March 2025 by entering into a collaborative agreement with the Japan Aeronautical Engineers Association (JAEA), which designated the college as an official examination venue for Japan's Specified Skilled Worker (SSW) Aircraft Mechanic Examination. Additionally, the college formalized deployment pipelines with the Japan Airport Services Company Ltd (JASCO) and launched an aerostructures student internship program with global aerospace manufacturer NORDAM in Tulsa, Oklahoma.

== Accreditations and Recognition ==
The institution is officially recognized by the Commission on Higher Education (CHED) and the Technical Education and Skills Development Authority (TESDA) for its technical certificate tracks.

To maintain nationwide educational quality baselines, the college subjects its degree programs to independent evaluation under the Philippine Association of Colleges and Universities Commission on Accreditation (PACUCOA):

- Level III Re-Accredited Status: Awarded to the Bachelor of Science in Aeronautical Engineering program, distinguishing it as the first aeronautical program in the Philippines to secure this specific tier of PACUCOA quality certification as certified by the Federation of Accrediting Agencies of the Philippines (FAAP).
- Level I / Candidate Status: Maintained across its primary core academic tracks, including the Bachelor of Science in Aircraft Maintenance Technology (AMT), Bachelor of Science in Avionics Technology, and its allied air transportation, business, and hospitality management tracks.

== Academic program ==
PATTS academic program offerings are officially recognized by the Commission on Higher Education (CHED), the Technical Education and Skills Development Authority (TESDA), the Professional Regulation Commission (PRC), and the National Telecommunications Commission (NTC). The Civil Aviation Authority of the Philippines (CAAP) certifies the institution as an Approved Training Organization (ATO), maintaining official operational ratings for Airframe, Powerplant, and Avionics instruction.

As part of the technical curriculum requirements, students undergo mandatory On-the-Job-Training (OJT) structures with regional aviation organizations and military units, including Philippine Airlines, Air Philippines, Cebu Pacific, Lufthansa Technik Philippines, Aviation Partnership Philippines, and the Philippine Air Force.

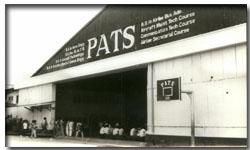
Former PATTS campus

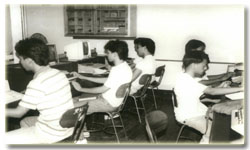
Computer laboratory in the 70s

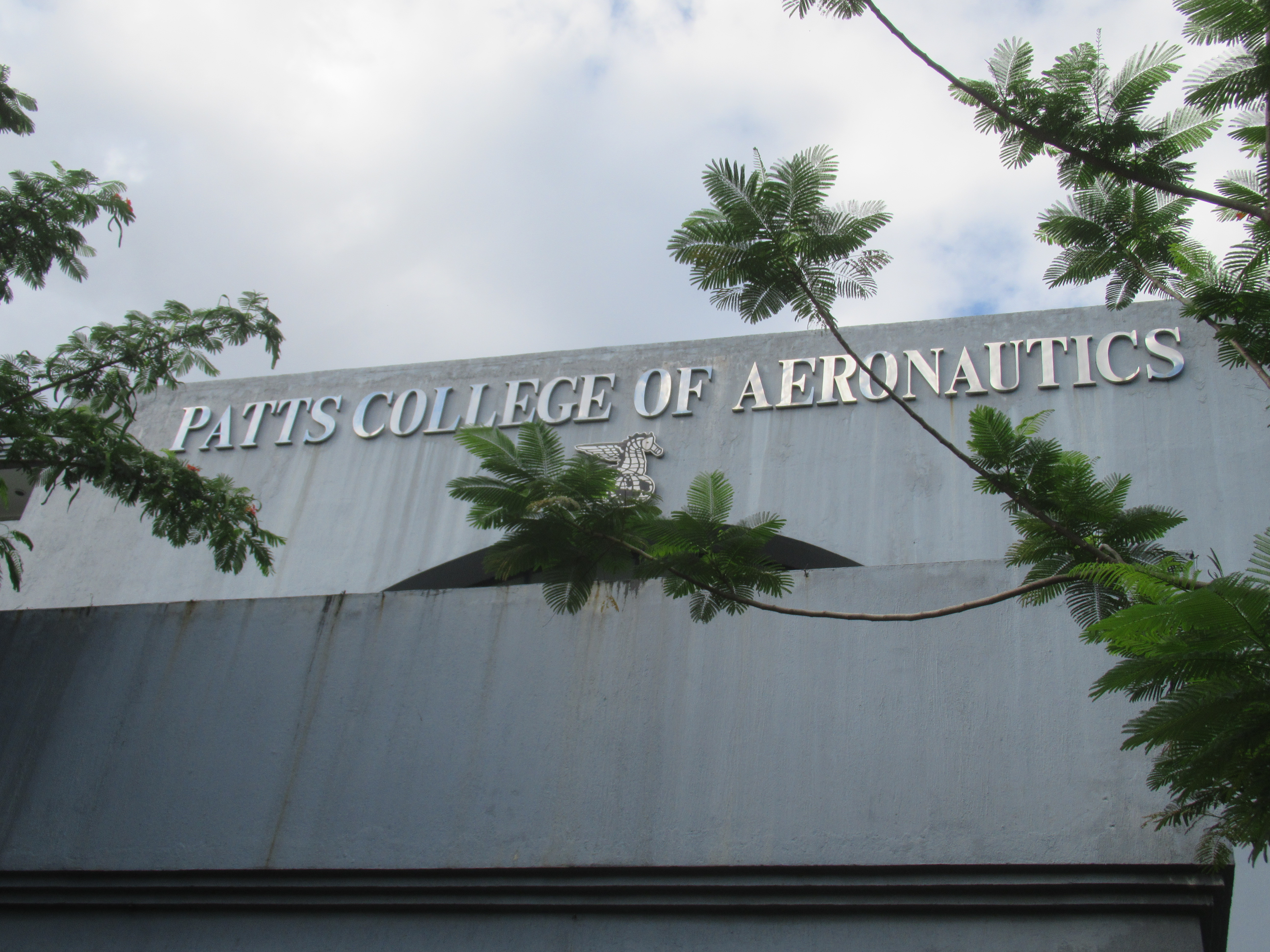
Facade in 2023

=== Board Examination Performance ===
The institution's graduates regularly record highly competitive passing margins in the annual Aeronautical Engineers Licensure Examination (AELE) administered by the Professional Regulation Commission. In the 2025 licensure track, the college registered 158 successful board passers, establishing a first-time test-taker passing rate of 81.03%, significantly outperforming the recorded national passing average of 64.25%.

=== International Partnerships and Global Deployment ===
The college maintains strategic cross-border academic agreements and internship structures to transition its graduates directly into foreign aviation labor markets:

- United States Aerostructures Track: Maintained in partnership with global aerospace manufacturing leader NORDAM based in Tulsa, Oklahoma. The program deploys annual batches of student-interns under the J1 Visa structure for year-long industrial placements specialized in manufacturing composite components for commercial aircraft.
- Japan Aviation Program: Administered in coordination with the Japan Aeronautical Engineers Association (JAEA) and Japan Airport Services Corporation (JASCO). Under this framework, PATTS serves as an official Southeast Asian examination venue for the Specified Skilled Worker (SSW) Aircraft Mechanic Exam, training and deploying graduates of the specialized PATTS Nihongo Center directly into operational structures at Narita International Airport.

== Programs offered ==
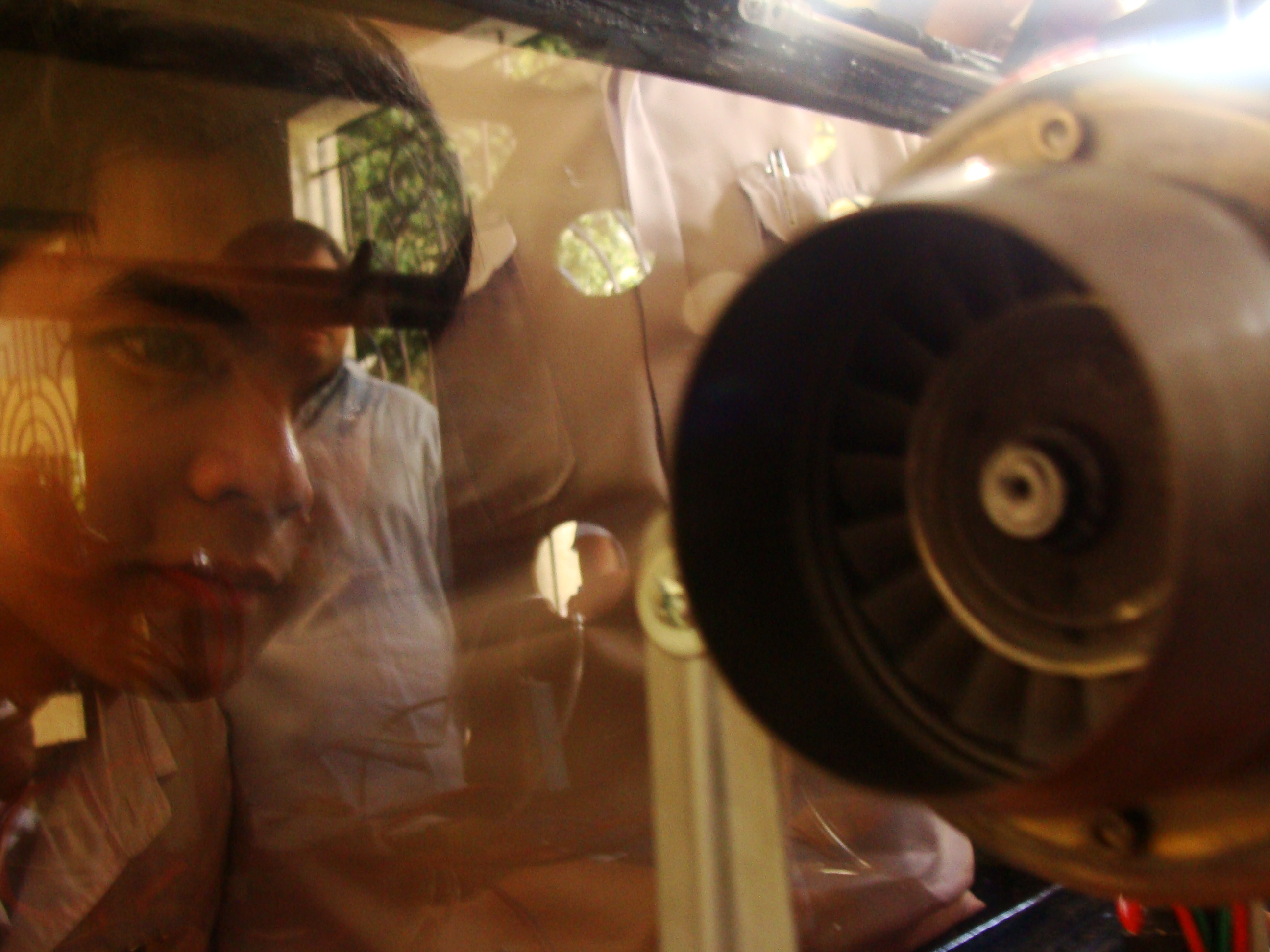
A student inspects a mini gas turbine engine.

The college offers various undergraduate degree profiles alongside secondary education structures tracking technical-vocational pathways:

=== Undergraduate Programs ===
- Bachelor of Science in Aeronautical Engineering
- Bachelor of Science in Industrial Engineering
- Bachelor of Science in Air Transportation
- Bachelor of Science in Avionics Technology
- Bachelor of Science in Aircraft Maintenance Technology
- Bachelor of Science in Airline Business Administration
- Bachelor of Science in Tourism Management
- Aircraft Technician Course (2-year diploma course)

=== Secondary Education ===
- Senior High School – Science, Technology, Engineering, and Mathematics (STEM) Strand
- Senior High School – Accountancy, Business, and Management (ABM) Strand

== Campus ==
=== Parañaque Main Campus ===
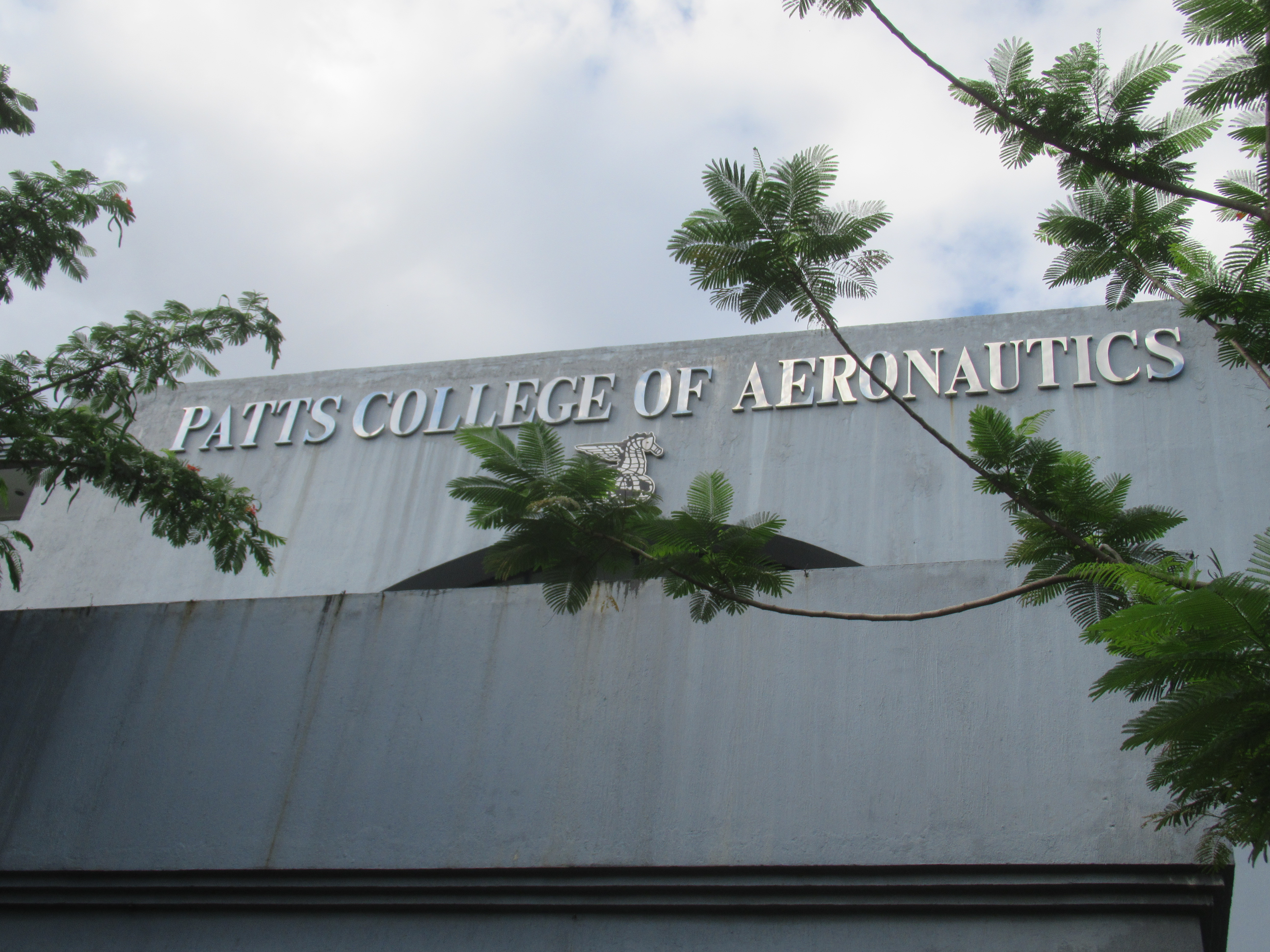
The main campus building and specialized engineering wings of the PATTS College of Aeronautics in Parañaque.

The primary campus structure of the PATTS College of Aeronautics sits on a 15,000-square-meter (160,000 sq ft) urban property located along Lombos Avenue, San Isidro, Parañaque, Metro Manila. The academic complex is divided into specialized structural wings engineered to isolate noise and optimize technical modes of instruction. Strategically flanked by access transit links, the campus's core layout places a heavy emphasis on industrial engineering spaces, keeping laboratory structures isolated from standard lecture halls to ensure academic safety during machinery operation. The facilities are fully regulated under standard building safety templates and maintain continuous equipment oversight to comply with changing local aviation guidelines.

By architectural configuration on the main grounds, the technical instructional facilities stand as the core functional landmarks of the property. The laboratories are organized into individual testing zones featuring independent climate systems, exhaust arrays for engine testing, and specialized power grids. The campus layout is recognized for its dedicated hangar facility, designed to simulate operational aviation contexts. The entire main campus perimeter is integrated with multi-point safety corridors, facilitating rapid movement between theory lecture rooms and practical test facilities while providing students with simulated industrial settings.

=== Technical and Academic Facilities ===
The institution houses specialized research and instructional hubs designated for specific degree programs and professional tracks:

- Airframe and Powerplant Shops: Core training grounds for Aircraft Maintenance Technology (AMT) and Aviation Technology students, featuring a 2,000-square-meter instructional footprint dedicated to aircraft inspection, safety wiring, propeller design, airframe construction, and structural maintenance.
- Aeronautical Engineering Laboratory: An advanced engineering facility equipped with specialized test instruments, structural analysis systems, and experimental wind tunnels utilized for engineering design, research, and aerodynamics testing.
- Avionics and Electronics Shops: Dedicated electrical test environments housing individual workstations featuring integrated electrical test panels and diagnostic machinery tailored for electrical system integration and avionics training.
- Visual Vectoring EnRoute Training (VVET) Laboratory: A specialized air traffic laboratory configured for Air Traffic Control (ATC) students, utilizing dedicated air traffic control simulators and Radar Skills Trainers to emulate real-world surveillance separation and airspace vectoring scenarios.
- Flight Simulation Center: Maintained in partnership with the First Aviation Academy (FAA), the center houses an official RedBird flight simulator configuration utilized for Private Pilot License (PPL) Ground School Training and cockpit instrumentation orientation.
- Composite Training Laboratory: Operated in coordination with HEATCON Composite Systems, this lab provides specialized chemical and structural repair stations for hands-on experience in complex composite materials repair for both fixed-wing and rotor aircraft.

=== Off-Campus Affiliates ===
==== Hotel Monticello ====
Beyond its primary aviation training structures in Metro Manila, the college maintains an external off-campus asset footprint through Hotel Monticello, situated on a 6,000-square-meter (65,000 sq ft) property in Tagaytay, Cavite. The multi-story hotel asset serves as a dedicated hospitality laboratory, training hub, and clinical internship center for the college's allied non-aviation programs. This property provides real-world operational and technical management experience for students enrolled under the Bachelor of Science in Tourism Management and Bachelor of Science in Hotel and Restaurant Management tracks.

== Publications ==
The institution maintains official print and digital media conduits managed under the student affairs department to document academic research, institutional news, and campus updates:

- Aeroscope: The official quarterly student magazine of the PATTS College of Aeronautics. Published independently in both English and Filipino, the magazine tracks industrial aviation trends, technical research highlights, and campus development profiles.
- Contrails: The official institutional yearbook publication of the college, documenting the graduating cohorts and annual historical milestone achievements of the academic community.

== Student organizations ==
The following are recognized organizations in the campus:

=== Program Oriented Organizations ===
- PATTS ABM Society (ABM)
- PATTS Airline Business Administration Society (ABASOC)
- PATTS Aeronautical Engineering Research Organization (AERO)
- PATTS Aircraft Technician Organization (ATO)
- PATTS Alliance of Aircraft Mechanic Troubleshooters (AAMT)
- PATTS Guild of Air Transportation Students (GATS)
- PATTS Avionics Society (PAVIOS)
- PATTS STEM Society (STEM)
- PATTS Tourism Society (PTS)
- Society of PATTS Industrial Engineering Students (SPIES)
- PATTS Association of Science Enthusiast (PASE)

=== Special Interest Organizations ===
As of March 2023, the active campus-wide special-interest organizations are as follows:

- PATTS College of Aeronautics Alumni Association
- PATTS Student Council (PSC)
- PATTS Achievers' League (PAL)
- PATTS Basic Engineering Pioneers of Innovative Construction (B-EPIC)
- PATTS College Red Cross Youth (CRCY, formerly Red Cross Youth Council of PATTS, RCYCP)
- PATTS Corps of Cadets (NSTP-ROTC)
- PATTS Dance Company (PDC)
- PATTS Debaters Club (PDC)
- PATTS Elite Gamers Association (PEGA)
- PATTS Green Ambassadors (PGA)
- PATTS International Students Organization (PISO)
- PATTS Peer Facilitators (PPF)
- PATTS Royal Cavalry (PRC), the college's pep band
- PATTS Seahorse Network (PSN)
- PATTS Social Science Society (SSS)
- PATTS Vocal Harmony (PVH)
- Rotaract Club of Parañaque Poblacion-PATTS (Rotaract)
- PATTS U-knighted Chess Club (PUKCC)

=== Office Organizations ===
- PATTS Student Council (PSC)
- The Aeroscope Publication, the Official Magazine Publication of PATTS
- Contrails Yearbook Publication

== Notable alumni ==
- Isabel Granada (1970–2017) – A prominent Filipino actress, singer, and commercial pilot. She graduated from the institution in 2001 with a Bachelor of Science in Aeronautical Engineering, notably being the sole female graduate in her class cohort.
- Paulie Yllana – A Filipino television and film actor who pursued technical aviation electronics and maintenance programs at the institution prior to establishing his career in the local entertainment industry.
- Sherman Tupas – A Filipino musician and technical educator who serves as the bassist for the alternative rock band Kaligta, signed under Sony Music Philippines.
- Christian C. Javier – An accomplished international chess player who earned the titles of National Master (PHI), Arena Chess Grandmaster (2018), and Correspondence International Master (2025). He also holds certifications as a FIDE National Arbiter and International Chess Organizer.
- Irene M. Alcantara – A recognized chess arbiter certified by the National Chess Federation of the Philippines (NCFP) and affiliated with the College of Architecture and Urban Planning (CAUP).
- J. Rey Soul (born Jessica Joy Seria Reynoso) – A Filipino-American singer who rose to prominence as a finalist on the first season of The Voice of the Philippines and later joined the global musical group Black Eyed Peas as a featured vocalist and touring member.

== See also ==
- Parañaque
