= Manila Tytana Colleges =

Private college in Pasay, Philippines

- Official seal
- Former names: Manila Doctors Hospital School of Nursing (1975–1980); Manila Doctors College (1980–2010)
- Motto: Home of the Titans
- Type: Private
- Established: 1975
- Founder: George Ty
- President: Sergio S. Cao
- Students: About 5,000
- Location: 76 Diosdado Macapagal Boulevard, Pasay 1302, Metro Manila, Philippines; 14°32′25″N 120°59′15″E
- Campus: Urban, 2 acres (8,100 m^{2})
- Nickname: Titans
- Sporting affiliations: ISAA
- Mascot: Titan
- Website: www.mtc.edu.ph
- Location in Metro Manila Location in Luzon Location in the Philippines

Manila Tytana Colleges (MTC), or just simply Tytana (/tiːˈtænɑː/ tee-TAN-ah), the educational arm of the Metrobank Group, is a private college in Pasay, Philippines.

In 2010, Manila Doctors College was renamed into Manila Tytana Colleges. The same year, the new name was registered with the Securities and Exchange Commission (SEC), while the operative date of use was set to June 1, 2011.

The College of Nursing, retaining the former name of the college, is now called Manila Doctors College of Nursing.

== History ==
Founded and formally inaugurated during the 19th anniversary celebration of Manila Doctors Hospital (MDH) in 1975 and first known as the Manila Doctors Hospital School of Nursing, the college was originally located at the fourth floor of the Manila Doctors Hospital along United Nations Avenue in Manila. Its founding members include Dr. Ambrosio Tangco, Dr. Gonzalo F. Austria, Dr. Fidel Estrada, Dr. Jose Villanueva and then members of the Board of Directors of MDH. Mrs. Cristeta T. Patajo was the first principal.

The college initially offered a three-year graduate Nursing course. In 1978, a permit to offer the four-year Bachelor of Science in Nursing and Bachelor of Science in Liberal Arts courses was granted by the Department of Education, Culture and Sports (DECS). A major milestone was marked in the college's history when the Metrobank Foundation Inc. acquired control of the Manila Medical Services, Inc. in February 1979. With the takeover, a new set of hospital directors was elected, headed by Dr. George S.K. Ty as chairman and Mr. Edgardo Espiritu as president.

On February 14, 1980, the college was renamed Manila Doctors College as the status was granted as a reflection of its varied course offerings, which included Bachelor of Science in nursing, Bachelor of Science in psychology, Bachelor of Science in zoology, and a two-year certificate course in Pulmonary Therapy. In October 1993, the college was registered as a non-stock corporation with the Securities and Exchange Commission (SEC). The Articles of Incorporation was amended in August 2013, and was approved by the SEC in March 2014, to register the college as a non-stock, non-profit corporation. In 1995, the Nursing program was accorded Level I Accreditation by the Federation of Accrediting Agencies of the Philippines (FAAP) by virtue of the authority granted by the then DECS, having satisfactorily met the standards and fulfilled the requirements of the Philippine Accrediting Association of Schools, Colleges, and Universities (PAASCU). In April 2002, the college formally earned the Level II Accreditation from PAASCU. The boom in nursing education paved the way for the expansion of the college. As a newly organized management prepared for the influx of students, efforts were conscientiously taken to maintain the quality of education. As enrollment steadily grew, the college adhered to academic standards imposed by both private accrediting bodies and concerned government agencies. As a result, the Commission on Higher Education (CHED) granted full Deregulated Status to the college in October 2003.

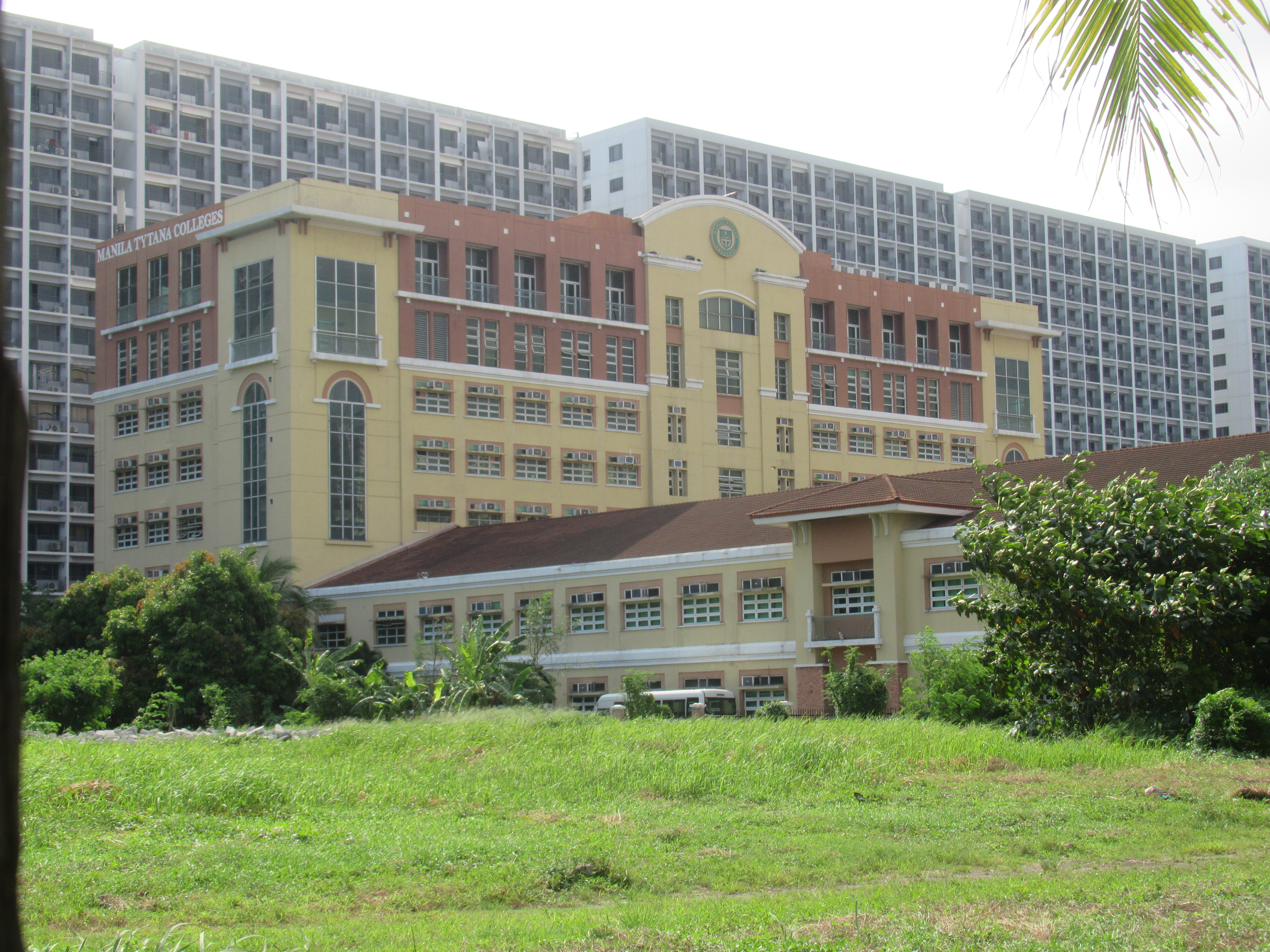
Manila Tytana Colleges campus in Pasay

On November 12, 2004, the college inaugurated its new campus along President Diosdado Macapagal Boulevard in Pasay. A year later, the Doña Tytana Tower was built. The new seven-storey facility was inaugurated during the college's 30th anniversary celebration (November 18, 2005).

In 2008, the college opened the Bachelor of Science in Holistic Nutrition with Culinary Arts, the first of its kind in the Philippines to combine nutrition and culinary arts in one academic program. The Nursing program, on the other hand, was granted Level II Re-accreditation by the PAASCU. A year after, recognizing the demand of the industry and high school students, the college welcomed its first batch of Bachelor of Science in Hotel and Restaurant Management students, and in 2010, the first batch of Bachelor of Science in Information Technology. The same year, the Psychology program was accorded Level I Accreditation by the Philippine Association of Colleges and Universities Commission on Accreditation (PACUCOA).

In 2011, the college opened new business courses – Accountancy, Entrepreneurship and Business Administration with majors in Business Economics, Financial Management, Operations Management, Marketing Management, and Human Resource Development Management, housed under the newly established College of Accountancy and Management (CAM). The Psychology program was accorded Level II Accreditation by PACUCOA in 2013. The following year, Tytana welcomed its first batch of Bachelor of Science in Tourism Management students. Tytana created the Center for Hospitality Management to offer the Tourism Management, and Hotel and Restaurant Management programs. In 2015, the college opened the Bachelor of Arts in Communication program, and Senior High School.
