= Journal of Medieval Religious Cultures =

- Discipline: Mysticism, history
- Language: English
- Edited by: Jessica Barr, Barbara Zimbalist

Publication details
- Former name(s): Mystics Quarterly, 14th Century English Mystics Newsletter
- History: 1974-present
- Publisher: Penn State University Press (United States)
- Frequency: Biannually

Standard abbreviations
- ISO 4: J. Mediev. Relig. Cult.

Indexing
- ISSN: 1947-6566 (print); 2153-9650 (web)
- JSTOR: 19476566
- OCLC no.: 316799057

Links
- Journal homepage; Online access at Project MUSE

The Journal of Medieval Religious Cultures is a peer-reviewed academic journal that publishes essays on mystical and devotional texts, especially from the Western Middle Ages. It is published twice a year by Penn State University Press. The journal previously went by the names 14th Century English Mystics Newsletter (1974-1983) and Mystics Quarterly (1984-2008).
