= Manila Adventist College =

Christian college in Pasay, Philippines

- Seal
- Motto: "Lead On"
- Established: 1993
- Religious affiliation: Seventh-day Adventist Church
- Location: Pasay, Metro Manila, Philippines; 14°30′45″N 121°00′25″E
- Website: mac.edu.ph

Manila Adventist College (MAC) is a private, coeducational semi-boarding, Seventh-Day Adventist school in Pasay City, Metro Manila, Philippines.

== Academics ==
Manila Adventist College (MAC) offers six baccalaureate degrees within fields of accountancy, business administration, midwifery, nursing, physical therapy, and radiologic technology.
