= Jesse M. Robredo Coliseum =

Public sports arena in Camarines Sur, Philippines

- JMR Coliseum; JMRC; The Big Dome of the South
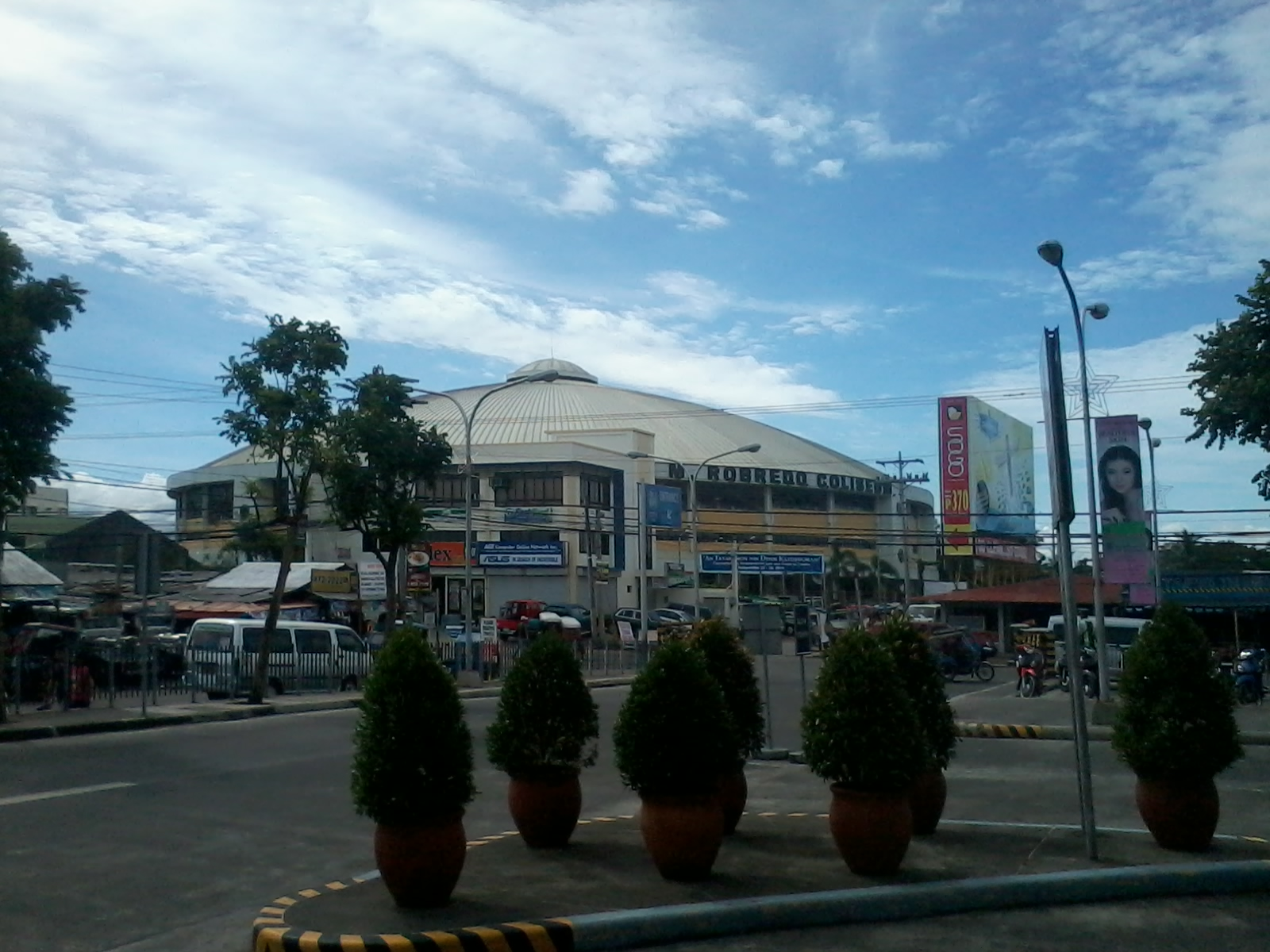
- Interactive map of Jesse M. Robredo Coliseum
- Former names: Naga City Coliseum (2010–2012)
- Location: Naga City, Camarines Sur, Philippines
- Coordinates: 13.62015°N 123.18824°E
- Owner: Naga City Government
- Operator: Naga City Government
- Capacity: ~12,000
- Surface: Hardwood / Polished cement

Construction
- Groundbreaking: 2009
- Opened: August 2010; 16 years ago

Tenant
- Philippine Basketball Association (out-of-town games)

The Jesse M. Robredo Coliseum (JMRC or JMR Coliseum) is an indoor sporting arena located in Naga City, Camarines Sur, Philippines. It is dubbed as The Big Dome of the South, being the largest indoor arena in Southern Luzon. It opened in August 2010 as Naga City Coliseum and has a maximum seating capacity of more than 12,000 spectators. Its construction started in 2009. On September 27, 2012, the coliseum was renamed in honor of the late former Mayor of Naga City and DILG Sec. Jesse M. Robredo who died in a plane crash.

== Notable events ==
The arena is one of the venues that the Philippine Basketball Association uses in its regular out of town games.

The Members Church of God International popularly known as Ang Dating Daan gathered to hold its Bicol Division Thanksgiving last June 2014.
