= St. Dominic College of Asia =

Private college in Cavite, Philippines

St. Dominic College of Asia (SDCA)
- Former names: St. Dominic College of Arts & Sciences (2003-2009)
- Motto: Revolutionizing Education
- Type: Private co-educational basic and higher education institution
- Established: November 28, 2003; 22 years ago
- Academic affiliations: PACUCOA, ACUCA, World Council for Curriculum and Instruction
- President: Gregorio A. Andaman Jr.
- Vice-president: Nilda W. Balsicas (VP for Academic Affairs & Research)
- Principal: Valerie H. Insigne (Basic Education Department)
- Location: Emilio Aguinaldo Highway, Bacoor, Cavite, Philippines; 14°27′32″N 120°57′37″E
- Campus: Urban
- Colors: Red and White
- Nickname: Dominican Pikemen
- Sporting affiliations: ISAA, National Capital Region Athletic Association
- Mascot: Nico Dominic
- Website: stdominiccollege.edu.ph
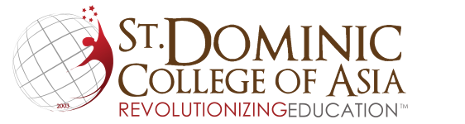

- Location in Luzon Location in the Philippines

The St. Dominic College of Asia, also referred to by its acronym SDCA, is a private co-educational basic and higher education institution in Bacoor, Cavite, Philippines. It was founded by Don Gregorio and Doña Dominga Andaman in 2003 and initially named St. Dominic College of Arts & Sciences. SDCA offers in preschool, primary, secondary, tertiary, postgraduate education levels, as well as technical-vocational education and training (TVET).

== History ==
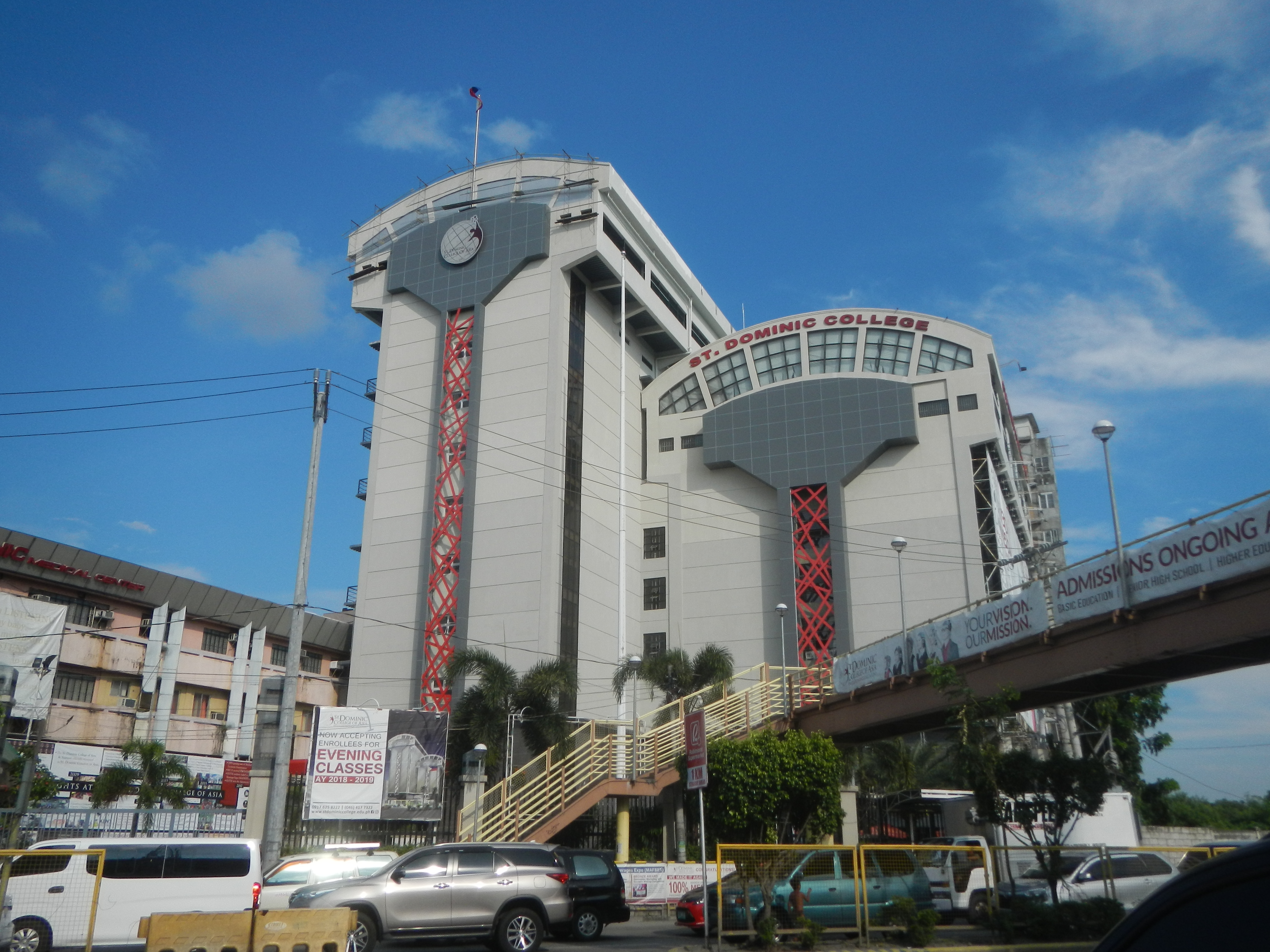
St. Dominic College of Asia in Bacoor

The school traces its roots with the establishment of the St. Dominic Medical Center (SDMC) in 1991 by founders Don Gregorio and Doña Dominga Andaman. In 2003, 12 years after the realization of the hospital in Cavite, a school named St. Dominic College of Arts & Sciences was added to the hospital.

Initially offering programs in Caregiving and BS Nursing in collaboration with the SDMC, St. Dominic has evolved into a full-fledged collegiate institution with four schools: School of Health Science Professions (SHSP), School of Arts, Sciences & Education (SASE), School of International Hospitality & Tourism Management (SIHTM), and School of Business & Computer Studies (SBCS).

In 2009, St. Dominic College of Arts & Sciences was officially renamed St. Dominic College of Asia.

In 2011, Dr. Marita A. Andaman-Rillo, eldest daughter of the founders, passed on the presidency of SDCA to the youngest Andaman son, Dr. Gregorio A. Andaman Jr. Dr. Andaman, in his first year of presidency, launched the institution's battlecry “Revolutionizing Education”. Highlights of this include the launch the Basic Education Unit (Preschool, Elementary, and High School), and accreditation of Business Administration, Information Technology, Education, Psychology, Hospitality Management and Nursing programs by the Philippine Association of Colleges and Universities Commission on Accreditation (PACUCOA), both in 2012.

=== Accreditation ===
In 2019 St. Dominic College of Asia has granted Deregulated Status by Commission on Higher Education (Philippines), the grant of deregulated status is given to private HEIs that have consistently shown exemplary performance in the provision of education, research and extension services, at the same time rationalizing supervision of private HEIs through progressive deregulation and last 2020, the Philippine Association of Colleges and Universities Commission on Accreditation (PACUCOA) awarded St. Dominic College of Asia as the TOP 3 College with Highest Accredited Programs in the Philippines for the third time.

== Academics ==
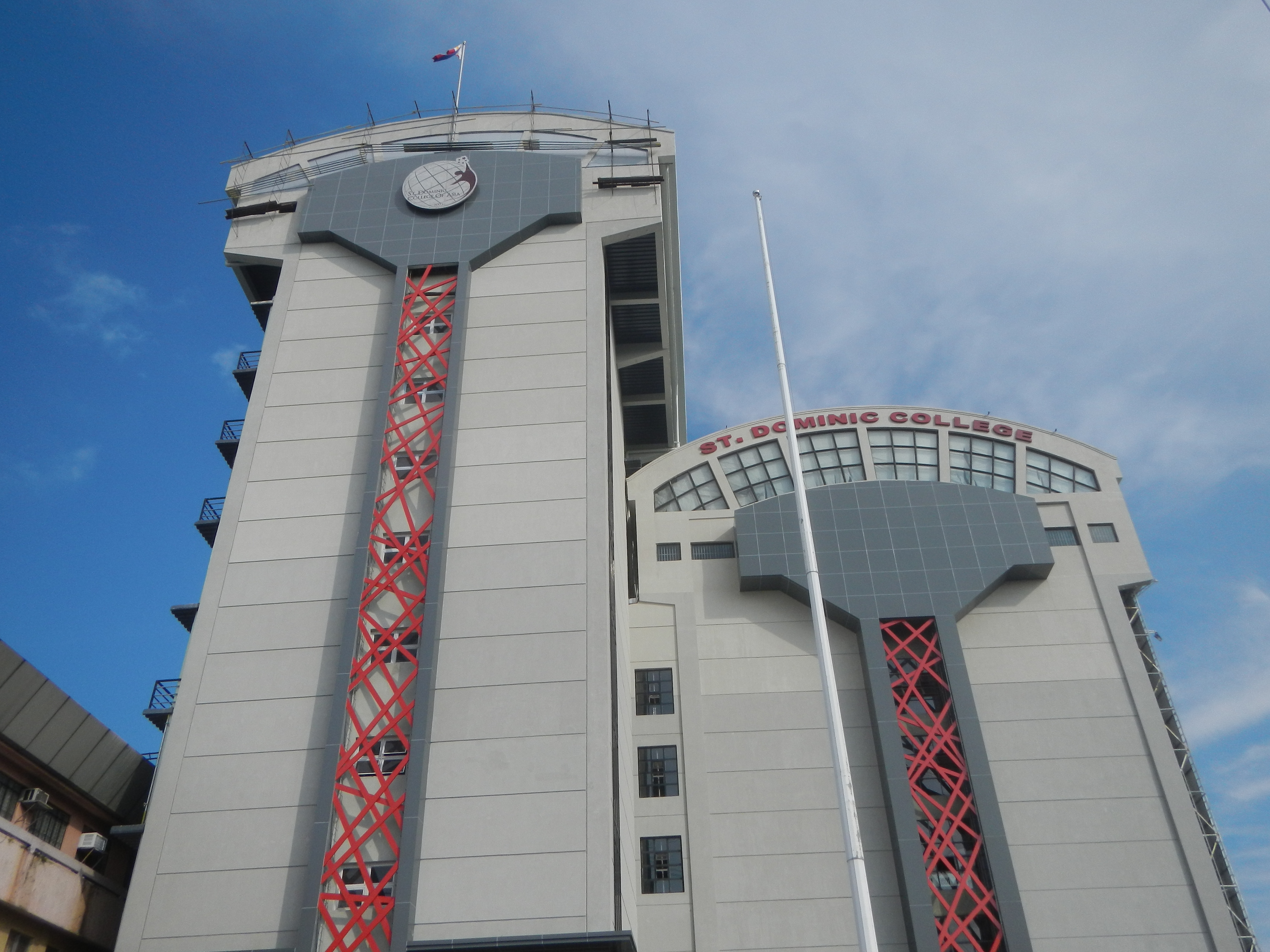
Facade in October 2018

St. Dominic College of Asia is divided into five schools, graduate school, basic and senior high school education department and SDCA offers 17 Undergraduate degree programs and 3 graduate degree programs. In 2022, Dr. Andaman announced the plan to build the School of Medicine for the 20th anniversary of SDCA.

=== Program Offerings ===
Basic Education

- Preschool
- Elementary
- Junior High School

Senior High School

- Accountancy, Business and Management (ABM)
- Humanities and Social Sciences (HUMSS)
- Science, Technology, Engineering and Mathematics (STEM)
- Technical-Vocational-Livelihood Track - Hotel and Restaurant Services (TVL HRS)
- Technical-Vocational-Livelihood Track - Information Communications Technology (TVL ICT)

Higher Education

School of Nursing and Allied Health Studies (SNAHS)

- Bachelor of Science in Nursing
- Bachelor of Science in Radiologic Technology
- Bachelor of Science in Physical Therapy

School of Medical Laboratory Science (SMLS)

- Bachelor of Science in Biology
- Bachelor of Science in Pharmacy
- Bachelor of Science in Medical Laboratory Science

School of Accountancy, Sciences, and Education (SASE)

- Bachelor of Science in Accountancy
- Bachelor of Science in Accounting Technology
- Bachelor of Science in Psychology
- Bachelor of Science in Elementary Education
- Bachelor of Science in Secondary Education

School of International, Hospitality, Tourism, and Management (SIHTM)

- Bachelor of Science in Business Administration
  Major in Financial Management
  Major in Marketing Management
  Major in Human Resource Development Management
  Major in Operations Management
- Bachelor of Science in Tourism Management
- Bachelor of Science in Hospitality Management
  Major in Cruiseline Operations
  Major in Culinary Arts & Kitchen Operations

School of Communication, Multimedia, and Computer Studies (SCMCS)

- Bachelor of Arts in Communication
- Bachelor of Multimedia Arts
- Bachelor of Science in Information Technology

Graduate Studies

- Master of Arts in Psychology
- Master of Business Administration
- Master of Science in Nursing

School of Medicine

- Doctor of Medicine

Technical Education and Skills Development Authority (TESDA) Accredited Technical-Vocational Programs

- Caregiving NCII
- Bread and Pastry NCII
- Agricultural Crops Education NCI and NC II
- Electrical Installation and Maintenance NCII
- Shielded Arc Metal Welding NCI and NCII
- Organic Agriculture Production NCII
