= 2020 Philippines men's national basketball team results =

- Head coach: Mark Dickel (February); Jong Uichico (November)
- Biggest win: Philippines 93–61 Thailand (Manama, Bahrain; November 27)
- Biggest defeat: None

The Philippines national basketball team was led by head coach Mark Dickel and later Jong Uichico in 2020.

The Philippines take part at the 2021 FIBA Asia Cup qualifiers (later postponed as to 2022). Led by interim coach Mark Dickel, They opened their campaign with a win over Indonesia in February 2020, before the qualifiers was suspended due to the COVID-19 pandemic.

Qualifiers would eventually resume in November 2020. The team was now led by Jong Uichico. Prior to their participation, they trained under a bubble in Calamba, Laguna within the same month.

== Tournaments ==
=== FIBA Asia Cup qualification ===
February 23
18:00

Boxscore

Indonesia	70–100	Philippines
Scoring by quarter: 15–18, 13–19, 25–30, 17–33
Pts: Prastawa 28; Rebs: Kosasih 8 Asts: Grahita 3		Pts: T. Ravena 23; Rebs: T. Ravena 8 Asts: Nieto 6

The BritAma Arena, Jakarta
Referees: Ryan Jones (NZL), Shigeyuki Arisawa (JPN), Leong Chuen Wing (SGP)

November 27 (Note: Originally scheduled for 20 February. However the game was delayed to a later date amid concerns over the COVID-19 pandemic.)
16:00

Boxscore

Philippines	93–61	Thailand
Scoring by quarter: 21–19, 32–10, 22–14, 18–18
Pts: Ramos 20; Rebs: Paras, Ramos 7 Asts: M. Nieto 6		Pts: Wongsawangtham 17; Rebs: Ghogar 7 Asts: Muangboon 7

Khalifa Sports City Stadium, Manama
Referees: Mohammad Alamiri (KUW), Paul Skayem (LBN), Mohamed Hasan Alsalam (BHR)

November 30
16:00

Boxscore

Thailand	69–93	Philippines
Scoring by quarter: 19–27, 15–26, 18–22, 17–18
Pts: Jakrawan 34; Rebs: Jakrawan 12; Asts: Suttisin 4		Pts: Ja. Gómez de Liaño 19; Rebs: Baltazar 11; Asts: three players 4

Khalifa Sports City Stadium, Manama
Referees: Yevgeniy Mikheyev (KAZ), Paul Skayem (LBN), Mohammad Taha (JOR)

== Rosters ==
Opposition: Indonesia (February 23)
Venue: The BritAma Arena, Jakarta

Philippines national basketball team – 2021 FIBA Asia Cup qualification roster roster
Players
Coaches

Pos.	No.	Name	Age – Date of birth	Height	Club	Ctr.
PG	0	Thirdy Ravena	23 – December 17, 1996	1.89 m (6 ft 2 in)	Free agent	(Philippines)
F	1	Juan Gomez de Liaño	20 – November 19, 1999	1.80 m (5 ft 11 in)	Free agent	(Philippines)
PG	4	Kiefer Ravena (C)	26 – October 27, 1993	1.85 m (6 ft 1 in)	NLEX Road Warriors	(Philippines)
PF	5	Abu Tratter	27 – January 9, 1993	1.96 m (6 ft 5 in)	Alaska Aces	(Philippines)
C	7	John Paul Erram	30 – July 7, 1989	2.07 m (6 ft 9 in)	NLEX Road Warriors	(Philippines)
F/C	9	Justin Chua	30 – July 13, 1989	1.98 m (6 ft 6 in)	Phoenix Pulse Fuel Masters	(Philippines)
C	11	Isaac Go	23 – June 7, 1996	2.00 m (6 ft 7 in)	Columbian Dyip	(Philippines)
PG	12	Matt Nieto	22 – May 31, 1997	1.85 m (6 ft 1 in)	NLEX Road Warriors	(Philippines)
SG	16	Roger Pogoy	27 – June 16, 1992	1.82 m (6 ft 0 in)	TNT KaTropa	(Philippines)
G	17	CJ Perez	26 – November 17, 1993	1.88 m (6 ft 2 in)	Columbian Dyip	(Philippines)
SF	18	Troy Rosario	28 – January 20, 1992	2.00 m (6 ft 7 in)	TNT KaTropa	(Philippines)
F	24	Dwight Ramos	21 – September 2, 1998	1.93 m (6 ft 4 in)	Free agent	(Philippines)

Head coach

- (New Zealand) Mark Dickel

Legend

- (C) Team captain
- Club – describes last
  club before the tournament
- Age – describes age
  on February 23, 2020

Opposition: Thailand (November 27 & 30)
Venue: Khalifa Sports City Stadium, Manama

Philippines national basketball team – 2021 FIBA Asia Cup qualification roster roster
Players
Coaches

Pos.	No.	Name	Age – Date of birth	Height	Club	Ctr.
SG	0	Javier Gomez de Liaño	22 – July 27, 1998	1.96 m (6 ft 5 in)	Free agent
PG	1	Juan Gomez de Liaño	21 – November 19, 1999	1.88 m (6 ft 2 in)	Free agent
SG	2	Jaydee Tungcab	23 – May 5, 1997	1.92 m (6 ft 4 in)	Free agent
SG	4	Rey Suerte	26 – October 4, 1994	1.92 m (6 ft 4 in)	Blackwater Elite	(Philippines)
SF	6	Kobe Paras	23 – September 19, 1997	1.98 m (6 ft 6 in)	Free agent
SF	7	Calvin Oftana	24 – January 3, 1996	1.96 m (6 ft 5 in)	Free agent
SG	10	Dave Ildefonso	20 – April 14, 2000	1.96 m (6 ft 5 in)	Free agent
C	11	Isaac Go	24 – June 7, 1996	2.03 m (6 ft 8 in)	Terrafirma Dyip	(Philippines)
PG	12	Matt Nieto	23 – May 31, 1997	1.85 m (6 ft 1 in)	NLEX Road Warriors	(Philippines)
SF	16	Mike Nieto	23 – May 31, 1997	1.88 m (6 ft 2 in)	Rain or Shine Elasto Painters	(Philippines)
C	19	Kemark Cariño	22 – February 1, 1998	2.06 m (6 ft 9 in)	Free agent
PF	23	William Navarro	23 – February 3, 1997	1.99 m (6 ft 6 in)	Free agent
PG	24	Dwight Ramos	22 – September 2, 1998	1.96 m (6 ft 5 in)	Free agent
PF	28	Justine Baltazar	23 – February 19, 1997	2.06 m (6 ft 9 in)	Free agent

Head coach

- (Philippines) Jong Uichico

Assistant coach(es)

- (Philippines) Boyet Fernandez
- (New Zealand) Tab Baldwin

Legend

- (C) Team captain
- Club – describes last
  club before the tournament
- Age – describes age
  on November 30, 2020

== Notes ==
Preceded by 2019	Philippines national basketball team results 2020	Succeeded by 2021
