= 2023 Philippines men's national basketball team results =

- Head coach: Chot Reyes (until September); Tim Cone (from September)
- Biggest win: Singapore 45–105 Philippines (Phnom Penh, Cambodia; May 13)
- Biggest defeat: Philippines 62–87 Jordan (Hangzhou, China; September 30)

The Philippines national basketball team was led by head coach Chot Reyes until the appointment of Tim Cone in September.

By January 2023, Reyes has temporarily stepped down as coach of the TNT Tropang Giga allowing him to focus on fulfilling his duties as head coach of the national team. Jojo Lastimosa succeeded him as TNT coach. Reyes however remained an active consultant with helping Lastimosa guide the Philippine Basketball Association (PBA) team in their 2023 PBA Governors' Cup run.

In February 2023, the Philippines took part in the final window of the 2023 FIBA Basketball World Cup Asian qualifiers. The national team ended their participation in the qualifiers with a lost to Jordan.

As one of the hosts of the 2023 FIBA Basketball World Cup, the Philippines were already qualified regardless of their performance.

Prior to the World Cup, the team took part in the 2023 Southeast Asian Games in Cambodia where FIBA eligibility rules were not used and a passport-only rule is imposed for players. The Philippine roster is a mix of PBA and college players. It is reinforced by naturalized player and American-born Justin Brownlee, as well as Filipino-foreigners Filipino-foreigners and Chris Ross who are ineligible to play as a local in FIBA-sanctioned tournaments.

The Philippines were grouped with host Cambodia, Malaysia, and Singapore in the group stage. They won their opener against Malaysia, before figuring in a historic lost against the hosts who were laden by six naturalized players. They were still able to advance to the semifinals by winning their final group game against Singapore. They won the semifinal before getting revenge against the hosts in the final to claim the gold.

For the FIBA Basketball World Cup in August, the Philippines are set to face Italy, the Dominican Republic and Angola in Group A. The Philippines have played against Italy and Angola in the 2019 FIBA World Cup in China while they faced the Dominican Republic in the Belgrade tournament of the 2020 FIBA Men's Olympic Qualifiers in June to July 2021. The Philippines lost its last games against these three oppositions. Reyes would step down from the head coaching role shortly after the game.

== Tournaments ==
=== 2023 FIBA Basketball World Cup qualification (Asia) ===
February 24
18:00 (UTC+8)

Boxscore

Philippines	107–96	Lebanon
Scoring by quarter: 25–19, 28–22, 29–23, 25–32
Pts: Brownlee 17; Rebs: three players 5 Asts: Thompson 6		Pts: Saoud 27; Rebs: Mansour 7 Asts: El Darwich 6

Philippine Arena, Bocaue
Attendance: 12,956
Referees: Yu Jung (TPE), James Boyer (AUS), Daigo Urushima (JPN)

February 27
18:00 (UTC+8)

Boxscore

Philippines	90–91	Jordan
Scoring by quarter: 14–33, 27–27, 23–10, 26–21
Pts: Brownlee 41; Rebs: Brownlee 12; Asts: Thompson 7		Pts: Tucker 22; Rebs: Tucker 12; Asts: Ibrahim 8

Philippine Arena, Bocaue
Attendance: 5,196
Referees: Yu Jung (TPE), James Boyer (AUS), Daigo Urushima (JPN)

=== Southeast Asian Games ===
==== Preliminary round ====
May 9
13:00 (UTC+7)

Box score

Philippines	94–49	Malaysia
Scoring by quarter: 33–12, 25–10, 26–16, 10–11
Pts: Ganuelas-Rosser 15; Rebs: Philips 15; Asts: 3 players 3		Pts: Wong 15; Rebs: Wong 7 Asts: Heng, Ooi 2

Morodok Techo National Sports Center, Phnom Penh
Attendance: 100
Referees: Yuen Chun Yip (HKG), Rakesh Ramalingaiah (IND), Rendy Putra Dwiantino (INA)

May 11
17:00 (UTC+7)

Box score

Philippines	68–79	Cambodia
Scoring by quarter: 14–26, 17–21, 16–19, 21–13
Pts: Standhardinger 14; Rebs: Standhardinger 11; Asts: Standhardinger 4		Pts: Dorsey 22; Rebs: Lopes 10; Asts: Dorsey 7

Morodok Techo National Sports Center, Phnom Penh
Attendance: 100
Referees: Tomohiro Hosoda (JPN), Lee Seung-mu (KOR), Rendy Putra Dwiantino (IND)

May 13
13:00 (UTC+7)

Box score

Singapore	45–105	Philippines
Scoring by quarter: 5–29, 14–27, 15–30, 11–19
Pts: Ng S. 10; Rebs: Ng J. 5 Asts: K. Lim 3		Pts: Lassiter 16; Rebs: Perez 11; Asts: Brownlee 8

Morodok Techo National Sports Center, Phnom Penh
Attendance: 100
Referees: Lee Seung-mu (KOR), Imran Ali Baig (IND), Trieu Chi Thanh (VIE)

==== Semifinal ====
May 15
17:00 (UTC+7)

Box score

Indonesia	76–84	Philippines
Scoring by quarter: 24–20, 21–18, 20–22, 11–24
Pts: Prosper 26; Rebs: Prosper 9 Asts: Beane Jr. 6		Pts: Brownlee 34; Rebs: Brownlee 9 Asts: Brownlee 5

Morodok Techo National Sports Center, Phnom Penh
Attendance: 100
Referees: Tomohiro Hosoda (JPN), Lee Seung-mu (KOR), Chan Owe Shiong (MAS)

==== Final ====
May 16
15:00 (UTC+7)

Box score

Cambodia	69–80	Philippines
Scoring by quarter: 22–21, 11–23, 18–20, 18–16
Pts: Peterson 18; Rebs: Peterson 14; Asts: Pridgett 5		Pts: Brownlee 23; Rebs: Brownlee, Standhardinger 7 Asts: Brownlee, Newsome 4

Morodok Techo National Sports Center, Phnom Penh
Attendance: 1800
Referees: Lee Seung-mu (KOR), Leong Chuen Wing (SGP), Chang Lu-Yueh (TPE)

=== Heyuan WUS International Basketball Tournament ===
August 3
20:00 (UTC+8)

Report

Philippines	76–65	Iran B

Heyuan Gymnasium, Heyuan

August 4
20:00 (UTC+8)

Report

Philippines	64–72	Senegal

Jiangman En Ping Sport Gymnasium, Enping

August 6
20:00 (UTC+8)

Report

Philippines	75–63	Senegal

Heyuan Gymnasium, Heyuan

August 7
20:00 (UTC+8)

Report

Philippines	63–48	Iran B

Xiaoqing Sport Center, Zhaoqing

=== FIBA Basketball World Cup ===
==== Group phase ====
August 25
20:00 (UTC+8)

Boxscore

Dominican Republic	87–81	Philippines
Scoring by quarter: 22–18, 20–24, 24–22, 21–17
Pts: Towns 26; Rebs: Towns 10; Asts: Feliz 8		Pts: Clarkson 28; Rebs: Clarkson, Fajardo 7 Asts: Clarkson 7

Philippine Arena, Bocaue
Attendance: 38,115
Referees: Yohan Rosso (FRA), Leandro Zalazar (ARG), Gatis Saliņš (LAT)

August 27
20:00 (UTC+8)

Boxscore

Philippines	70–80	Angola
Scoring by quarter: 19–12, 14–24, 19–20, 18–24
Pts: Clarkson 21; Rebs: Fajardo 7 Asts: Clarkson 7		Pts: Gonçalves 17; Rebs: Bango, Fernando 7 Asts: Domingos 7

Araneta Coliseum, Quezon City
Attendance: 12,784
Referees: Guilherme Locatelli (BRA), Mārtiņš Kozlovskis (LAT), Martin Vulić (CRO)

August 29
20:00 (UTC+8)

Boxscore

Philippines	83–90	Italy
Scoring by quarter: 23–20, 16–28, 21–25, 23–17
Pts: Clarkson 23; Rebs: Edu 8 Asts: Clarkson 6		Pts: Fontecchio 18; Rebs: Fontecchio, Melli 6 Asts: Spissu 9

Araneta Coliseum, Quezon City
Attendance: 11,821
Referees: Yohan Rosso (FRA), Leandro Zalazar (ARG), Mārtiņš Kozlovskis (LAT)

==== Classification round ====
August 31
20:00 (UTC+8)

Boxscore

South Sudan	87–68	Philippines
Scoring by quarter: 34–17, 17–16, 9–17, 27–18
Pts: Jones 17; Rebs: Gabriel 11; Asts: Jones 14		Pts: Clarkson 24; Rebs: Edu 14; Asts: Ravena 5

Araneta Coliseum, Quezon City
Attendance: 9,250
Referees: Guilherme Locatelli (BRA), Gatis Saliņš (LAT), Georgios Poursanidis (GRE)

September 2
20:00 (UTC+8)

Boxscore

Philippines	96–75	China
Scoring by quarter: 16–16, 23–24, 34–11, 23–24
Pts: Clarkson 34; Rebs: Edu 10; Asts: Ramos, Thompson 4		Pts: Li 17; Rebs: Li 9 Asts: Li 5

Araneta Coliseum, Quezon City
Attendance: 11,080
Referees: Mārtiņš Kozlovskis (LAT), Kerem Baki (TUR), Martin Vulić (CRO)

=== Asian Games ===
==== Group phase ====
September 26
13:30 (UTC+8)

Results

Philippines	89–61	Bahrain
Scoring by quarter: 22–18, 29–15, 21–14, 17–14
Pts: Perez, Kouame 15; Rebs: Brownlee 9 Asts: Lassiter 4		Pts: Almoathin 14; Rebs: Chism 13; Asts: Almoathin 3

Hangzhou Olympic Sports Centre Gymnasium, Hangzhou
Referees: Paul Skayem (LBN), Taha Mohammed Nasser Al-Hashedi (YEM), Li Chengxin (CHN)

September 28
17:30 (UTC+8)

Boxscore

Thailand	72–87	Philippines
Scoring by quarter: 22–20, 13–21, 15–27, 22–19
Pts: Lamb 29; Rebs: Jakrawan, Klahan 6 Asts: Lish, J. Morgan 3		Pts: Brownlee 19; Rebs: Brownlee 12; Asts: Thompson 9

Hangzhou Olympic Sports Centre Gymnasium, Hangzhou
Referees: Yuen Chun Yip (HKG), Hu Jing (CHN), Mohammad Rajabiozoodi (IRI)

September 30
11:00 (UTC+8)

Boxscore

Jordan	87–62	Philippines
Scoring by quarter: 16–13, 26–16, 17–23, 28–10
Pts: Hollis-Jefferson 24; Rebs: Bohannon 9 Asts: Hollis-Jefferson 9		Pts: Brownlee 24; Rebs: Thompson 11; Asts: Brownlee, Perez 3

Zhejiang University Zijingang Gymnasium, Hangzhou
Referees: Yuen Chun Yip (HKG), Song Houlu (CHN), Issam Nasser Khalfan Al Siyabi (OMA)

==== Qualification for quarterfinals ====
October 2
16:00 (UTC+8)

Report

Philippines	80–41	Qatar
Scoring by quarter: 33–14, 24–9, 16–7, 7–11
Pts: Fajardo, Perez 12; Rebs: Kouame 10; Asts: Newsome 6		Pts: Muslic 12; Rebs: Ndao 8 Asts: four players 4

Zhejiang University Zijingang Gymnasium, Hangzhou
Referees: Wissam Zein (SYR), Hu Jing (CHN), Taha Al-Hashedi (YEM)

==== Quarterfinal ====
October 3
12:00 (UTC+8)

Boxscore

Iran	83–84	Philippines
Scoring by quarter: 22–28, 14–20, 18–23, 29–13
Pts: Vahedi 24; Rebs: Kazemi 8 Asts: Rezaeifer 7		Pts: Brownlee 36; Rebs: Brownlee, Fajardo 8 Asts: Brownlee, Fajardo 4

Zhejiang University Zijingang Gymnasium, Hangzhou
Referees: Alexey Stepanenko (KAZ), Taha Al-Hashedi (YEM), Ahmad Alyousef (JOR)

==== Semifinal ====
October 4
20:00 (UTC+8)

Boxscore

Philippines	77–76	China
Scoring by quarter: 17–19, 13–29, 20–14, 27–14
Pts: Brownlee 33; Rebs: Thompson 8 Asts: Brownlee, Perez 4		Pts: Zhao R. 18; Rebs: Zhu 8 Asts: Zhao R. 6

Hangzhou Olympic Sports Centre Gymnasium, Hangzhou
Referees: Paul Skayem (LBN), Alexey Stepanenko (KAZ), Wissam Zein (SYR)

==== Gold medal game ====
6 October
20:00 (UTC+8)

Boxscore

Jordan	60–70	Philippines
Scoring by quarter: 12–17, 19–14, 10–20, 19–19
Pts: Hollis-Jefferson 24; Rebs: Al-Dwairi 15; Asts: Hollis-Jefferson, Mustafa 5		Pts: Brownlee 20; Rebs: Kouame 11; Asts: Brownlee 5

Hangzhou Olympic Sports Centre Gymnasium, Hangzhou
Referees: Harja Jaladri (INA), Yuen Chun Yip (HKG), Paul Skayem (LBN)

== Exhibition games ==
June 27
18:00 (UTC+3)

Report

Estonia (Note: Junior national team)	81–71	Philippines
Scoring by quarter: 29–14, 20–21, 15–24, 17–12
Pts: Jürgens 20; Rebs: Jurkatamm 7 Asts: Kirsipuu 6		Pts: Ramos 16; Rebs: Fajardo 9 Asts: four players 2

Kalev Sports Hall, Tallinn

June 28
18:00 (UTC+3)

Report

Finland	89–85	Philippines
Scoring by quarter: 26–11, 25–31, 17–18, 21–25
Pts: Little 19; Rebs: Grandison 12; Asts: Grandison 3		Pts: Ramos 15; Rebs: Malonzo 7 Asts: Thompson 4

Kalev Sports Hall, Tallinn

July 1
18:00 (UTC+3)

Report

Philippines	70–61	Ukraine U20
Scoring by quarter: 16–12, 17–19, 20–17, 17–13
Pts: Abando 18; Rebs: Ramos 8 Asts: Brownlee, K. Ravena 5		Pts: Kobzystyi 21; Rebs: Brynyuk 6 Asts: Koshevatsky 4

Žalgiris Arena, Kaunas

July 2
17:00 (UTC+3)

Report

Philippines	84–74	Ukraine U20
Scoring by quarter: 20–20, 25–22, 24–18, 15–14
Pts: Brownlee 21; Rebs: Brownlee 8 Asts: Perez 8		Pts: Kobzystyi 15; Rebs: Brynyuk 10; Asts: Koshevatsky 5

Žalgiris Arena, Kaunas

July 4
– (UTC+3)

Report 1, 2

Lithuania Selection	90–80	Philippines

Žalgiris Arena, Kaunas

July 8
11:00 (UTC+3)

Report

Lithuania Universiade	102–125	Philippines

Žalgiris Arena, Kaunas

August 18
20:00 (UTC+8)

Report

Philippines	85–62	Ivory Coast
Scoring by quarter: 27–24, 15–14, 18–15, 25–9
Pts: Clarkson, Fajardo 13; Rebs: Edu 7 Asts: Thompson 5		Pts: Diadet, Kone 12; Rebs: Sidibe 9 Asts: Diabate 4

PhilSports Arena, Pasig

August 20
20:00 (UTC+8)

Report

Philippines	87–102	Montenegro
Scoring by quarter: 19–16, 23–28, 22–32, 23–26
Pts: Clarkson 27; Rebs: Edu 8 Asts: Clarkson 5		Pts: Vučević 18; Rebs: Vučević 9 Asts: Perry 9

PhilSports Arena, Pasig

August 21
20:00 (UTC+8)

Report

Philippines	77–84	Mexico
Scoring by quarter: 27–31, 24–20, 12–18, 14–15
Pts: Thompson 14; Rebs: Fajardo, Thompson 6 Asts: Thompson 5		Pts: Stoll 17; Rebs: Ibarra 9 Asts: Girón, Stoll 4

PhilSports Arena, Pasig

September 22
19:00 (UTC+8)

Report

Philippines	86–81	(South Korea) Changwon LG Sakers

PhilSports Arena, Pasig

== Rosters ==
=== 2022 Asian Games ===
The following was the roster of the Philippines national team for the 2022 Asian Games in China.

Philippines national basketball – 2022 Asian Games roster
Players
Coaches

Pos.	No.	Name	Age – Date of birth	Height	Club	Ctr.
G/F	3	Chris Newsome	33 – July 25, 1990	1.88 m (6 ft 2 in)	Meralco Bolts	(Philippines)
PG	6	Kevin Alas	31 – November 13, 1991	1.83 m (6 ft 0 in)	NLEX Road Warriors	(Philippines)
SG	9	Scottie Thompson	30 – July 12, 1993	1.85 m (6 ft 1 in)	Barangay Ginebra San Miguel	(Philippines)
F	10	Arvin Tolentino	27 – November 5, 1995	1.96 m (6 ft 5 in)	NorthPort Batang Pier	(Philippines)
G	12	Chris Ross	38 – March 9, 1985	1.85 m (6 ft 1 in)	San Miguel Beermen	(Philippines)
G/F	13	Marcio Lassiter	36 – May 16, 1987	1.88 m (6 ft 2 in)	San Miguel Beermen	(Philippines)
C	15	June Mar Fajardo	33 – November 17, 1989	2.08 m (6 ft 10 in)	San Miguel Beermen	(Philippines)
G	17	CJ Perez	29 – November 17, 1993	1.88 m (6 ft 2 in)	San Miguel Beermen	(Philippines)
F	18	Calvin Oftana	27 – January 3, 1996	1.96 m (6 ft 5 in)	TNT Tropang Giga	(Philippines)
F	25	Japeth Aguilar (C)	36 – January 25, 1987	2.06 m (6 ft 9 in)	Barangay Ginebra San Miguel	(Philippines)
F	32	Justin Brownlee (NP)	35 – April 23, 1988	1.98 m (6 ft 6 in)	Barangay Ginebra San Miguel	(Philippines)
C	34	Ange Kouame (NP)	25 – December 15, 1997	2.08 m (6 ft 10 in)	Free agent

Head coach

- (United States) Tim Cone

Assistant coach(es)

- (Philippines) Richard del Rosario
- (Philippines) LA Tenorio
- (Philippines) Jong Uichico
- (Philippines) Josh Reyes

Legend

- (C) Team captain
- (NP) Naturalized player
- Club – describes last
  club before the tournament
- Age – describes age
  on September 26, 2023

=== 2023 FIBA Basketball World Cup ===
The following was the roster of the Philippines national team for the 2023 FIBA Basketball World Cup.

Philippines men's national basketball team – 2023 FIBA Basketball World Cup roster
Players
Coaches

Pos.	No.	Name	Age – Date of birth	Height	Club	Ctr.
G	4	Kiefer Ravena	29 – 27 October 1993	1.83 m (6 ft 0 in)	Shiga Lakes	(Japan)
G	6	Jordan Clarkson	31 – 7 June 1992	1.96 m (6 ft 5 in)	Utah Jazz	(United States)
G	8	Scottie Thompson	30 – 12 July 1993	1.85 m (6 ft 1 in)	Barangay Ginebra San Miguel	(Philippines)
C	11	Kai Sotto	21 – 11 May 2002	2.18 m (7 ft 2 in)	Hiroshima Dragonflies	(Japan)
F	13	Jamie Malonzo	27 – 31 July 1996	2.01 m (6 ft 7 in)	Barangay Ginebra San Miguel	(Philippines)
C	15	June Mar Fajardo	32 – 17 November 1989	2.08 m (6 ft 10 in)	San Miguel Beermen	(Philippines)
G	16	Roger Pogoy	31 – 16 June 1992	1.88 m (6 ft 2 in)	TNT Tropang Giga	(Philippines)
G	17	CJ Perez	29 – 17 November 1993	1.88 m (6 ft 2 in)	San Miguel Beermen	(Philippines)
G/F	23	Rhenz Abando	25 – 11 March 1998	1.88 m (6 ft 2 in)	Anyang KGC	(South Korea)
G	24	Dwight Ramos	24 – 2 September 1998	1.93 m (6 ft 4 in)	Levanga Hokkaido	(Japan)
F/C	25	Japeth Aguilar (C)	36 – 25 January 1987	2.05 m (6 ft 9 in)	Barangay Ginebra San Miguel	(Philippines)
F/C	34	A. J. Edu	23 – 1 January 2000	2.08 m (6 ft 10 in)	Toyama Grouses	(Japan)

Head coach

- (Philippines) Chot Reyes

Assistant coach(es)

- (United States) Tim Cone
- (Philippines) Jong Uichico

Legend

- (C) Team captain
- Club – describes last
  club before the tournament
- Age – describes age
  on 25 August 2023

==== Qualification ====
The following was the roster of the Philippines national team for the final window of the Asian qualifiers of the 2023 FIBA Basketball World Cup qualification.

Philippines national basketball team – 2023 FIBA Basketball World Cup qualification roster
Players
Coaches

Pos.	No.	Name	Age – Date of birth	Height	Club	Ctr.
G	0	Thirdy Ravena	26 – December 17, 1996	1.89 m (6 ft 2 in)	San-en NeoPhoenix	(Japan)
G	1	Bobby Ray Parks Jr.	30 – February 19, 1993	1.93 m (6 ft 4 in)	Nagoya Diamond Dolphins	(Japan)
F	2	Calvin Oftana (R)	27 – January 3, 1996	1.95 m (6 ft 5 in)	TNT Tropang Giga	(Philippines)
G	4	Kiefer Ravena	29 – October 27, 1993	1.85 m (6 ft 1 in)	Shiga Lakes	(Japan)
G	7	Jordan Heading	27 – January 30, 1996	1.88 m (6 ft 2 in)	Nagasaki Velca	(Japan)
SG	8	Scottie Thompson	29 – July 12, 1993	1.86 m (6 ft 1 in)	Barangay Ginebra San Miguel	(Philippines)
SF	13	Jamie Malonzo	26 – July 31, 1996	2.01 m (6 ft 7 in)	Barangay Ginebra San Miguel	(Philippines)
C	15	June Mar Fajardo	33 – November 17, 1989	2.08 m (6 ft 10 in)	San Miguel Beermen	(Philippines)
G	17	CJ Perez	29 – November 17, 1993	1.88 m (6 ft 2 in)	San Miguel Beermen	(Philippines)
C	21	Mason Amos	18 – August 21, 2004	2.01 m (6 ft 7 in)	Brisbane State High School	(Australia)
PG	24	Dwight Ramos	23 – September 2, 1998	1.93 m (6 ft 4 in)	Levanga Hokkaido	(Japan)
F	28	Kevin Quiambao (R)	21 – April 22, 2001	2.04 m (6 ft 8 in)	De La Salle Green Archers	(Philippines)
F	32	Justin Brownlee (NP)	34 – March 24, 1988	2.00 m (6 ft 7 in)	Barangay Ginebra San Miguel	(Philippines)

Head coach

- (Philippines) Chot Reyes

Assistant coach(es)

- (United States) Tim Cone
- (Philippines) Jong Uichico

Legend

- (C) Team captain
- (NP) Naturalized player
- (R) Roster change (Note: Oftana was included in the team roster which played against Lebanon. Quiambao replaced Oftana for the game against Jordan; the sole roster change.)
- Club – describes last
  club before the tournament
- Age – describes age
  on February 27, 2023

=== Southeast Asian Games ===
The following was the roster of the Philippines national team for the 2023 Southeast Asian Games in Cambodia.

Philippines national basketball team – 2023 Southeast Asian Games roster
Players
Coaches

Pos.	No.	Name	Age – Date of birth	Height	Club	Ctr.
F	2	Calvin Oftana (I)	27 – January 3, 1996	1.96 m (6 ft 5 in)	TNT Tropang Giga	(Philippines)
G	5	Jerom Lastimosa	–	1.78 m (5 ft 10 in)	Adamson Soaring Falcons	(Philippines)
F	10	Arvin Tolentino	27 – November 5, 1995	1.96 m (6 ft 5 in)	NorthPort Batang Pier	(Philippines)
G/F	11	Chris Newsome	32 – July 25, 1990	1.88 m (6 ft 2 in)	Meralco Bolts	(Philippines)
G	12	Chris Ross (FI)	38 – March 9, 1985	1.85 m (6 ft 1 in)	San Miguel Beermen	(Philippines)
G/F	13	Marcio Lassiter	35 – May 16, 1987	1.88 m (6 ft 2 in)	San Miguel Beermen	(Philippines)
G/F	17	CJ Perez	29 – November 17, 1993	1.88 m (6 ft 2 in)	San Miguel Beermen	(Philippines)
C	20	Michael Phillips	–	2.03 m (6 ft 8 in)	De La Salle Green Archers	(Philippines)
C	21	Mason Amos	18 – August 21, 2004	2.01 m (6 ft 7 in)	Brisbane State High School	(Australia)
F	32	Justin Brownlee (NP)	35 – March 24, 1988	2.00 m (6 ft 7 in)	Barangay Ginebra San Miguel	(Philippines)
F/C	34	Christian Standhardinger (FI)	32 – July 4, 1989	2.03 m (6 ft 8 in)	Barangay Ginebra San Miguel	(Philippines)
F/C	45	Brandon Ganuelas-Rosser	28 – June 29, 1994	1.98 m (6 ft 6 in)	NLEX Road Warriors	(Philippines)

Head coach

- (Philippines) Chot Reyes

Assistant coach(es)

- (United States) Tim Cone
- (Philippines) Jong Uichico

Legend

- (C) Team captain
- (NP) Naturalized player
- (FI) Ineligible as a "local" player in FIBA-sanctioned tournaments
- Club – describes last
  club before the tournament
- Age – describes age
  on May 9, 2023

== Notes ==
Preceded by 2022	Philippines national basketball team results 2023	Succeeded by 2024
