= 2024 Philippines national basketball team results =

Basketball team results

2024 Philippines men's national basketball team results
- Head coach: Tim Cone
- Biggest win: Philippines 106–53 Chinese Taipei (Pasig, Philippines; February 25)
- Biggest defeat: Turkey 84–73 Philippines (Istanbul, Turkey; June 27); Brazil 71–60 Philippines (Riga, Latvia; July 6)

The Philippines national basketball team is led by head coach Tim Cone.

Cone was made permanent head coach in January 2024, after being named interim coach for the 2022 Asian Games in September 2024 following the resignation of Chot Reyes after the 2023 FIBA Basketball World Cup.

2024 is marked by the scheduled participation of the Philippine national team in the 2024 FIBA Men's Olympic Qualifying Tournament in Riga in Latvia and the 2025 FIBA Asia Cup qualifiers.

Prior to their departure for Latvia for the Olympic qualifier, played a tune-up with the Taiwan Mustangs at home. They also went to Poland and Turkey to play further games against those countries' respective national teams.

At the Olympic Qualifying Tournament in Latvia, they would upset the host country's national team which is their first win over a European team in an official FIBA game since 1960. They would lose to Georgia but advance to the semifinals due to point differential. Their progress was not expected with return flights originally booked under the assumption the team won't progress to the semifinals. Brazil would end their Olympic qualifying bid.

The Philippines qualified for the 2025 FIBA Asia Cup by the end of the November window of the qualifiers with two games to be played in the next year.

== Tournaments ==
=== 2025 FIBA Asia Cup qualification ===
February 22
20:00 (UTC+8)

Boxscore

Hong Kong	64–94	Philippines
Scoring by quarter: 15–23, 22–18, 9–30, 18–23
Pts: Leung 15; Rebs: Yeung 7 Asts: Yang 6		Pts: Brownlee 16; Rebs: Sotto 15; Asts: Thompson 9

Tsuen Wan Sports Centre
Attendance: 1,000
Referees: Scott Beker (AUS), Nattapong Jontapa (THA), Ruben Woolcock (AUS)

February 25
19:30 (UTC+8)

Boxscore

Philippines	106–53	Chinese Taipei
Scoring by quarter: 26–13, 26–14, 30–14, 24–12
Pts: Brownlee 26; Rebs: Brownlee 13; Asts: Thompson 9		Pts: Liu 13; Rebs: Lin Che. 5 Asts: Lin Chu. 5

PhilSports Arena, Pasig
Attendance: 7,812
Referees: Nattapong Jontapa (THA), Christopher Reid (AUS), Suebpong Wichaiphin (THA)

November 21
19:30

Boxscore

Philippines	93–89	New Zealand
Scoring by quarter: 20–22, 25–23, 27–18, 21–26
Pts: Brownlee 26; Rebs: Brownlee 11; Asts: Sotto 7		Pts: Webster 25; Rebs: Brown 9 Asts: Britt 13

SM Mall of Asia Arena, Pasay
Attendance: 11,686
Referees: Takaki Kato (JPN), Chuen Wing Leong (SGP), Haruga Iwai (JPN)

November 24

Boxscore

Philippines	93–54	Hong Kong
Scoring by quarter: 25–16, 20–19, 22–8, 26–11
Pts: Tamayo 16; Rebs: Sotto 15; Asts: Newsome, Quiambao 4		Pts: Leong 11; Rebs: Yip 8 Asts: Tsai, Yip 3

SM Mall of Asia Arena, Pasay
Attendance: 11,051
Referees: Takaki Kato (JPN), Chuen Wing Leong (SGP), Haruga Iwai (JPN)

=== 2024 FIBA Men's Olympic Qualifying Tournaments – Riga ===
July 3
19:00 (UTC+3)

Boxscore

Latvia	80–89	Philippines
Scoring by quarter: 16–32, 22–22, 18–23, 24–12
Pts: Rodions 18; Rebs: Rodions 7 Asts: Strēlnieks, Zoriks 5		Pts: Brownlee 26; Rebs: Brownlee 9 Asts: Brownlee 9

Arena Riga, Riga
Referees: Ademir Zurapović (BIH), Wojciech Liszka (POL), Kerem Baki (TUR)

July 4
15:30 (UTC+3)

Boxscore

Philippines	94–96	Georgia
Scoring by quarter: 17–28, 26–27, 31–19, 20–22
Pts: Brownlee 28; Rebs: Brownlee 8 Asts: Brownlee 8		Pts: Mamukelashvili 26; Rebs: Bitadze 10; Asts: Thomasson 8

Arena Riga, Riga
Attendance: 531
Referees: Ademir Zurapović (BIH), Omar Bermúdez (MEX), Kerem Baki (TUR)

July 6
15:30 (UTC+3)

Boxscore

Brazil	71–60	Philippines
Scoring by quarter: 12–22, 15–11, 24–6, 20–21
Pts: Caboclo 15; Rebs: Caboclo 11; Asts: Huertas 7		Pts: Brownlee 15; Rebs: Fajardo 10; Asts: Ramos 3

Arena Riga, Riga
Attendance: 837
Referees: Omar Bermúdez (MEX), Wojciech Liszka (POL), Kerem Baki (TUR)

== Exhibition games ==
June 24
18:00 (UTC+8)

Report

Philippines	74–64	(Chinese Taipei) Taiwan Mustangs
Scoring by quarter: 25–19, 12–13, 21–12, 16–20
Pts: Ramos 19		Pts: Lopes 15

PhilSports Arena, Pasig

June 27
20:00 (UTC+3)

Report

Turkey	84–73	Philippines
Scoring by quarter: 24–21, 18–19, 22–16, 20–17
Pts: Biberović 23; Rebs: Şanlı 7 Asts: Özdemiroğlu, Sipahi 6		Pts: Brownlee 21; Rebs: Fajardo 11; Asts: Ramos 7

BJK Akatlar Arena, Istanbul

June 29
18:00 (UTC+2)

Report

Poland	82–80	Philippines
Scoring by quarter: 16–23, 25–15, 17–18, 24–24
Pts: Sokołowski 21; Rebs: Miličić Jr., Sochan 4 Asts: Sokołowski 5		Pts: Brownlee 30; Rebs: Sotto 11; Asts: Ramos, Sotto 5

Zagłębiowski Park Sportowy, Sosnowiec

Preceded by 2023	Philippines national basketball team results 2024	Succeeded by 2025
