= 2021 Philippines men's national basketball team results =

- Head coach: Tab Baldwin
- Biggest win: Jordan B 63–90 Philippines (Amman, Jordan; July 28)
- Biggest defeat: Philippines 67–94 Dominican Republic (Belgrade, Serbia; July 1)

The Philippines national basketball team was led by head coach Tab Baldwin in 2021.

The Philippines continued their campaign to qualify for the 2021 FIBA Asia Cup. The COVID-19 pandemic caused disruption to the hosting of the third window of the qualifiers which was originally scheduled to be held in February 2021. The Philippines was scheduled to host games but Qatar took over the hosting duties. The hosting duties was reverted to the Philippines after Qatar begged off. The qualifiers was later postponed but was later successfully held in June 2021 with host Philippines managing to qualify for the tournament proper and sweeping all of their three games in the third window.

After initially failing to secure a berth in the FIBA World Olympic Qualifying Tournament (OQT) by virtue of FIBA rankings in September 2019, the Philippines was given a new chance to qualify for the 2020 Summer Olympics in Tokyo in February 2021. The team was given a berth in the OQT in Belgrade, Serbia after New Zealand's withdrawal. However the Philippines failed to qualify for the Olympics, losing games to Serbia and the Dominican Republic.

The team also participated at the 2021 King Abdullah Cup in Jordan as part of their preparations for the FIBA Asia Cup. However the FIBA Asia Cup was postponed by a year. Similarly the Philippines plans to field a basketball team at the 2021 Southeast Asian Games in Vietnam, but the multi-sporting event was likewise postponed to 2022.

== Tournaments ==
=== FIBA Asia Cup qualification ===
June 16
18:00 (UTC+8)

Boxscore

South Korea	78–81	Philippines
Scoring by quarter: 21–12, 23–24, 13–20, 21–25
Pts: Ra 24; Rebs: Ra 15; Asts: Byeon 7		Pts: Ramos 16; Rebs: Baltazar, Sotto 7 Asts: Abarrientos, Navarro 3

AUF Sports and Cultural Center, Angeles City
Referees: Rabah Noujaim (LBN), Ahmed Al-Shuwaili (IRQ), Leong Chuen Wing (SIN)

June 18
18:00 (UTC+8)

Boxscore

Philippines	76–51	Indonesia
Scoring by quarter: 15–11, 15–11, 21–14, 25–16
Pts: Baltazar, Kouame 11; Rebs: Ramos 12; Asts: Abarrientos 6		Pts: Prosper 22; Rebs: Prosper 8 Asts: Prastawa 5

AUF Sports and Cultural Center, Angeles City
Referees: Leong Chuen Wing (SIN), Rabah Noujaim (LIB), Ahmed Al-Shuwaili (IRQ)

June 20
15:00 (UTC+8)

Boxscore

Philippines	82–77	South Korea
Scoring by quarter: 18–20, 20–14, 18–20, 26–23
Pts: Ramos 19; Rebs: Kouame 8 Asts: Ramos 5		Pts: Ra 20; Rebs: Ra 8 Asts: Lee D. 10

AUF Sports and Cultural Center, Angeles City
Referees: Rabah Noujaim (LBN), Ahmed Al-Shuwaili (IRQ), Leong Chuen Wing (SIN)

=== 2020 Olympic Qualifying Tournament ===
June 30
20:15 (UTC+2)

Boxscore

Serbia	83–76	Philippines
Scoring by quarter: 22–16, 23–18, 22–28, 16–14
Pts: Marjanović 25; Rebs: Marjanović 10; Asts: Teodosić 6		Pts: Kouame 17; Rebs: Kouame 7 Asts: Belangel 6

Aleksandar Nikolić Hall, Belgrade
Referees: Yohan Rosso (FRA), Omar Bermúdez (MEX), James Boyer (AUS)

July 1
20:30 (UTC+2)

Boxscore

Philippines	67–94	Dominican Republic
Scoring by quarter: 22–23, 19–16, 10–26, 16–29
Pts: Heading 16; Rebs: Kouame 6 Asts: Belangel 10		Pts: Liz 23; Rebs: Araújo 7 Asts: Torres 6

Aleksandar Nikolić Hall, Belgrade
Referees: Guilherme Locatelli (BRA), Mārtiņš Kozlovskis (LAT), Kingsley Ojeaburu (NGA)

=== King Abdullah Cup ===
==== Preliminary round ====
July 26
16:00 (UTC+5)

Boxscore

Egypt	73–60	Philippines
Scoring by quarter: 13–12, 20–12, 22–19, 18–17
Pts: Abd Alhalem 14; Rebs: Saleh 7 Asts: Abd Alhalem, Saleh 5		Pts: Kouame, Go 13; Rebs: Kouame 11; Asts: Ramos 4

Prince Hamzah Sport Hall, Amman
Attendance: 55

July 27
13:00 (UTC+5)

Boxscore

Philippines	77–62	Saudi Arabia
Scoring by quarter: 19–14, 24–16, 22–19, 12–13
Pts: Baltazar 16; Rebs: Kouame 6 Asts: three players 4 each		Pts: Alsuwailem 18; Rebs: Abo-Jalas 7 Asts: Belal 4

Prince Hamzah Sport Hall, Amman
Attendance: 12
Referees: Eyad Abu Touq, Khaldoun Diset, Sami Tawfeeq

July 28
16:00 (UTC+5)

Boxscore

Jordan B	63–90	Philippines
Scoring by quarter: 14–25, 19–21, 18–28, 12–16
Pts: Obeid B 16; Rebs: Obeid B 6 Asts: Ahmad, Hamati 2		Pts: Ramos 21; Rebs: Tamayo 10; Asts: Ramos 6

Prince Hamzah Sport Hall, Amman
Attendance: 20
Referees: Khaldoun Diset, Tony Ashiji, Marwan Fatieha

July 29
19:00 (UTC+5)

Boxscore

Philippines	74–73 (OT)	Tunisia
Scoring by quarter: 15–14, 21–17, 13–22, 17–13, Overtime: 8–7
Pts: Kouame 12; Rebs: Baltazar 8 Asts: Kouame 5		Pts: Marnaoui 19; Rebs: Marnaoui 8 Asts: Marnaoui 5

Prince Hamzah Sport Hall, Amman
Referees: Ibrahim Jarrar, Thamer Alsebaei, Marwan Fteiha

July 30
19:00 (UTC+5)

Boxscore

Jordan	84–72	Philippines
Scoring by quarter: 18–16, 18–25, 31–15, 17–16
Pts: Al-Dwairi 23; Rebs: Forte 11; Asts: Mustafa		Pts: Heading 15; Rebs: Kouame 6 Asts: Abarrientos, Suerte 3

Prince Hamzah Sport Hall, Amman
Attendance: 2,467

==== Semifinal ====
July 31
19:00 (UTC+5)

Boxscore

Jordan	84–74	Philippines
Scoring by quarter: 28–15, 16–19, 19–22, 21–18
Pts: Forte, Al-Dwairi 19; Rebs: Al-Dwairi 16; Asts: Mustafa 8		Pts: Kouame 20; Rebs: Kouame 6 Asts: Heading 5

Prince Hamzah Sport Hall, Amman
Attendance: 2,467
Referees: Mohammad Fawzi, Sami Tawfeeq, Marwan Fteiha

==== Third place game ====
August 1
16:00 (UTC+5)

Boxscore

Tunisia	80–68	Philippines
Scoring by quarter: 23–18, 19–16, 22–19, 16–15
Pts: Jawadi 21; Rebs: Jawadi 6 Asts: Abada 6		Pts: Tamayo 14; Rebs: Baltazar 10; Asts: Belangel 4

Prince Hamzah Sport Hall, Amman
Referees: Ibrahim Jarar, Mohammad Tarawneh, Thamer Sbaae

== Exhibition games ==
June 23

Philippines	79–79	China

AUF Sports and Cultural Center, Angeles City

== Rosters ==
=== FIBA Asia Cup qualification ===
The following was the roster of the Philippines national team for the third window of the 2021 FIBA Asia Cup qualification.

Philippines national basketball team – 2021 FIBA Asia Cup qualification roster roster
Players
Coaches

Pos.	No.	Name	Age – Date of birth	Height	Club	Ctr.
G	3	RJ Abarrientos	21 – September 14, 1999	1.88 m (6 ft 2 in)	FEU Tamaraws	(Philippines)
C	5	Isaac Go	25 – June 7, 1996	2.00 m (6 ft 7 in)	Terrafirma Dyip	(Philippines)
SG	7	Jaydee Tungcab	24 – May 5, 1997	1.92 m (6 ft 4 in)	UP Fighting Maroons	(Philippines)
C	11	Kai Sotto	19 – May 11, 2002	2.22 m (7 ft 3 in)	Adelaide 36ers	(Australia)
SG	14	Jaydee Tungcab	24 – May 5, 1997	1.92 m (6 ft 4 in)	UP Fighting Maroons	(Philippines)
G	15	Jordan Heading	25 – January 30, 1996	1.88 m (6 ft 2 in)	Blackwater Bossing	(Philippines)
C	18	Geo Chiu	20 – May 18, 2001	2.06 m (6 ft 9 in)	Ateneo Blue Eagles	(Philippines)
C	23	William Navarro	24 – February 3, 1997	1.99 m (6 ft 6 in)	Ateneo Blue Eagles	(Philippines)
PG	24	Dwight Ramos	22 – September 2, 1998	1.93 m (6 ft 4 in)	Ateneo Blue Eagles	(Philippines)
G	27	SJ Belangel	21 – June 27, 1999	1.77 m (5 ft 10 in)	Ateneo Blue Eagles	(Philippines)
PF	28	Justine Baltazar	24 – February 19, 1997	2.03 m (6 ft 8 in)	De La Salle Green Archers	(Philippines)
C	34	Ange Kouame (NP)	23 – December 15, 1997	2.11 m (6 ft 11 in)	Ateneo Blue Eagles	(Philippines)

Head coach

- (New Zealand) Tab Baldwin

Assistant coach(es)

- (Philippines) Jong Uichico
- (Philippines) Sandy Arespacochaga

Legend

- (C) Team captain
- (NP) Naturalized player
- Club – describes last
  club before the tournament
- Age – describes age
  on June 18, 2021

=== 2020 FIBA Men's Olympic qualifying tournament ===
The following was the roster of the Philippines national team for the 2020 FIBA Men's Olympic Qualifying Tournament in Belgrade.

Philippines national basketball team – 2020 FIBA Olympic Qualifying Tournament roster
Players
Coaches

Pos.	No.	Name	Age – Date of birth	Height	Club	Ctr.
PG	3	RJ Abarrientos	21 – September 14, 1999	1.81 m (5 ft 11 in)	FEU Tamaraws	(Philippines)
F/C	5	Isaac Go (C)	25 – June 7, 1996	2.03 m (6 ft 8 in)	Terrafirma Dyip	(Philippines)
SF	7	Mike Nieto	24 – May 31, 1997	1.88 m (6 ft 2 in)	Rain or Shine Elasto Painters	(Philippines)
C	11	Kai Sotto	19 – May 11, 2002	2.22 m (7 ft 3 in)	Adelaide 36ers	(Australia)
SG	15	Jordan Heading	25 – January 30, 1996	1.88 m (6 ft 2 in)	Blackwater Bossing	(Philippines)
C	18	Geo Chiu	20 – May 18, 2001	2.06 m (6 ft 9 in)	Ateneo Blue Eagles	(Philippines)
SF	23	William Navarro	24 – February 3, 1997	1.99 m (6 ft 6 in)	Ateneo Blue Eagles	(Philippines)
SG	24	Dwight Ramos	22 – September 2, 1998	1.93 m (6 ft 4 in)	Ateneo Blue Eagles	(Philippines)
PG	27	SJ Belangel	22 – June 27, 1999	1.77 m (5 ft 10 in)	Ateneo Blue Eagles	(Philippines)
PF	28	Justine Baltazar	24 – February 19, 1997	2.03 m (6 ft 8 in)	De La Salle Green Archers	(Philippines)
PF	33	Carl Tamayo	20 – February 13, 2001	2.01 m (6 ft 7 in)	UP Fighting Maroons	(Philippines)
C	34	Ange Kouame (NP)	23 – December 15, 1997	2.11 m (6 ft 11 in)	Ateneo Blue Eagles	(Philippines)

Head coach

- (New Zealand) Tab Baldwin

Assistant coach(es)

- (Philippines) Jong Uichico
- (Philippines) Sandy Arespacochaga

Legend

- (C) Team captain
- (NP) Naturalized player
- Club – describes last
  club before the tournament
- Age – describes age
  on June 30, 2021

Preceded by 2020	Philippines national basketball team results 2016	Succeeded by 2022
