= Miss Universe Bahrain =

National beauty pageant competition in Bahrain

- Formation: 2021; 5 years ago
- Type: Beauty pageant
- Headquarters: Dubai; Manama
- Locations: United Arab Emirates; Bahrain
- Members: Miss Universe
- Official language: English; Arabic
- National director: Josh Yugen
- Website: www.houseofyugen.com

Miss Universe Bahrain is a national beauty pageant in Bahrain established in 2021 under the Yugen Group to choose the representation of Bahrain in the Miss Universe.

== Editions ==
Edition	Date	Final Venue	Entrants	Competition Result			Ref.
Edition	Date	Final Venue	Entrants	Miss Universe Bahrain	1st Runner-up	2nd Runner-up	Ref.
—	November 29, 2021	Manama, Bahrain (Designation)	—	Manar Nadeem Deyani^{[α]}			
1st	September 11, 2022	Manama, Bahrain	7	Evlin Abdulla Khalifa	Lujane Yacoub	Shereen Ahmed	
2nd	September 2, 2023	Mirihi Island Resort, Maldives	7	Lujane Yacoub	Advaita Shetty	Tuhina Carrol	
3rd	October 9, 2024	Mirihi Island Resort, Maldives	8	Shereen Ahmed	Advaita Shetty	Ola Adel	

Note:
- ^α Manar was appointed by the Miss Bahrain Organization under Yugen Group. 2021 was the first time Bahrain joined the Miss Universe competition.

== Titleholders ==
- : Declared as Winner
- : Ended as runner-up or top 5/6 qualification
- : Ended as one of the finalists or semifinalists
- : Ended as special awards winner

On occasion, when the winner does not qualify (due to age) a runner-up is sent.

Year	Governorate	Miss Bahrain	Placement at Miss Universe	Special Award(s)
Josh Yugen directorship — a franchise holder to Miss Universe from 2021
2024	Capital Governorate, Manama	Shereen Ahmed	Unplaced	Voice for Change (Silver Finalist)
2023	Northern Governorate, Hamala	Lujane Yacoub (Note: Lujane was the 1st runner-up of Evlin Abdulla Khalifa at the Miss Universe Bahrain 2022 pageant.)	Unplaced	
2022	Southern Governorate, Riffa	Evlin Abdulla Khalifa	Unplaced	
2021	Southern Governorate, Riffa	Manar Nadeem Deyani	Unplaced	

=== Wins by governorate ===
Governorate	Titles	Years
Southern Governorate	2	2021, 2022
Northern Governorate	1	2023
Capital Governorate	1	2024
