= 2018 Philippines men's national basketball team results =

The Philippines men's national basketball team, led by head coach Chot Reyes continues their campaign to advance from the first round of the 2019 FIBA Basketball World Cup Asian qualifiers. The national team is set to face Australia in Melbourne and Bocaue, Japan in Pasay, and Chinese Taipei in an away game. After the first round of the World Cup qualifiers, Yeng Guiao took over as head coach of the national team.

The first training of the national team for 2018 commenced on January 8, as they prepare for the second window of the first round of the World Cup Asian qualifiers.

== Record ==
Competition	Result	GP	W	L
Asian Games	Fifth place	5	3	2

== Uniforms ==
Until August 2018
Philippines 1st Uniform	Philippines 2nd Uniform

August 2018 onwards
Philippines 1st Uniform	Philippines 2nd Uniform

== Tournaments ==
=== 2019 FIBA Basketball World Cup qualification ===
==== First round ====
Phase: First round

February 22
19:30 (UTC+11)

Boxscore

Australia	84–68	Philippines
Scoring by quarter: 19–19, 18–13, 26–17, 21–19
Pts: Gliddon 16; Rebs: Creek 11; Asts: Cadee 5		Pts: Fajardo 15; Rebs: Blatche 7 Asts: Aguilar, Ravena 2

Margaret Court Arena, Melbourne
Referees: Ye Nan (CHN), Chan Owe Shiong (MAS), Hwang In-tae (KOR)

February 25
19:30 (UTC+8)

Boxscore

Philippines	89–84	Japan
Scoring by quarter: 21–22, 25–19, 26–20, 17–23
Pts: Blatche 18; Rebs: Blatche 16; Asts: Ravena 5		Pts: Hiejima 23; Rebs: Brown 8 Asts: Shinoyama 4

Mall of Asia Arena, Pasay
Attendance: 10,422
Referees: Nicolas Fernandes (TAH), Duan Zhu (CHN), Ryan Jones (NZL)

June 29
19:00 (UTC+8)

Boxscore

Chinese Taipei	71–93	Philippines
Scoring by quarter: 19–16, 18–28, 23–24, 11–25
Pts: Davis 17; Rebs: Davis 7 Asts: Tseng, Yang 4		Pts: Fajardo 22; Rebs: Blatche 12; Asts: Romeo 6

Taipei Heping Basketball Gymnasium (Taiwan)
Referees: Rabah Noujaim (LIB), Budi Marfan (INA), Preeda Muongmee (THA)

July 2
19:30 (UTC+8)

Boxscore

Philippines	53–89	Australia
Scoring by quarter: 18–23, 19–29, 16–37, game abandoned^{1}
Pts: Blatche 12; Rebs: Blatche 10; Asts: Romeo 5		Pts: Goulding 20; Rebs: three players 4 Asts: three players 4

Philippine Arena, Bocaue
Attendance: 22,181
Referees: Ahmed Al-Bulushi (OMA), Hatim Al-Harbi (KSA), Paul Skayem (LIB)

^{1} A bench-clearing brawl broke out with 4:02 remaining in the third quarter, resulting in 13 players (nine from the Philippines and four from Australia) being ejected. The game was halted with 1:57 remaining in the third quarter when two of the remaining Philippines players fouled out, and awarded to Australia as a default. Potential penalties from FIBA are pending.

==== Second round ====
Phase: Second round

September 13
17:00

Boxscore

Iran	81–73	Philippines
Scoring by quarter: 21–22, 19–16, 23–21, 18–14
Pts: Nikkhah 21; Rebs: Kazemi 11; Asts: Mashayekhi, Nikkhah 4		Pts: Standhardinger 30; Rebs: Standhardinger 12; Asts: Cabagnot 5

Azadi Basketball Hall, Tehran
Referees: Duan Zhu (CHN), Kim Jong-kuk (KOR), Hwang In-tae (KOR)

September 17
19:30

Boxscore

Philippines	92–81	Qatar
Scoring by quarter: 15–26, 24–26, 28–12, 25–17
Pts: Aguilar, Cabagnot 16; Rebs: Aguilar 9 Asts: four players 3		Pts: Yousuf 26; Rebs: Ngombo 10; Asts: Yousuf, Ngombo 5

Smart Araneta Coliseum, Quezon City
Attendance: 0 (Note: The game was played behind closed doors due to sanctions imposed by FIBA following the Philippines-Australia brawl.)
Referees: Rabah Noujaim (LIB), Ahmed Al-Shuwaili (IRQ), Ryan Jones (NZL)

November 30
19:30

Boxscore

Philippines	88–92	Kazakhstan
Scoring by quarter: 18–17, 21–23, 23–25, 26–27
Pts: Pringle 29; Rebs: Fajardo 13; Asts: Pringle 4		Pts: Zhigulin 30; Rebs: Bykov 9 Asts: Murzagaliyev 6

Mall of Asia Arena, Pasay
Attendance: 16,798
Referees: Hwang In-tae (KOR), Harja Jaladri (INA), Ye Nan (CHN)

December 3
19:30

Boxscore

Philippines	70–78	Iran
Scoring by quarter: 20–19, 19–16, 15–15, 16–28
Pts: Castro 19; Rebs: Standhardinger 8 Asts: Lassiter 7		Pts: Jamshidi 26; Rebs: Hassanzadeh, Mirzaei 8 Asts: Jamshidi 7

Mall of Asia Arena, Pasay
Attendance: 14,473
Referees: Duan Zhu (CHN), Rabah Noujaim (LBN), Marwan Egho (LBN)

=== Asian Games ===
16 August
10:00

Kazakhstan	59–96	Philippines
Scoring by quarter: 9–16, 11–25, 23–20, 16–35
Pts: Bykov 13; Rebs: Gavrilov 8 Asts: Murzagaliyev 6		Pts: Pringle 18; Rebs: Almazan 8 Asts: Tiu 5

Gelora Bung Karno Basketball Hall, Jakarta
Referees: Yuen Chun Yip (HKG), Mohammad Doust (IRI), Jun Horiuchi (JPN)

21 August
16:00

Philippines	80–82	China
Scoring by quarter: 12–20, 19–16, 26–23, 23–23
Pts: Clarkson 28; Rebs: Clarkson, Standhardinger 8 Asts: Clarkson 4		Pts: Zhou 25; Rebs: Zhou 12; Asts: Liu, Sun 5

Gelora Bung Karno Basketball Hall, Jakarta
Referees: Yuen Chun Yip (HKG), Hadi Salem (IRI), Imran Ali Baig (IND)

27 August
10:00

South Korea	91–82	Philippines
Scoring by quarter: 22–18, 20–26, 22–21, 27–17
Pts: Ra 30; Rebs: Ra 14; Asts: Kim S. 10		Pts: Clarkson 25; Rebs: Standhardinger 9 Asts: Lee 5

Gelora Bung Karno Basketball Hall, Jakarta
Referees: Yuen Chun Yip (HKG), Alexey Stepanenko (KAZ), Imran Ali Baig (IND)

28 August
16:00

Philippines	113–80	Japan
Scoring by quarter: 27–27, 30–20, 25–17, 31–16
Pts: Standhardinger 27; Rebs: Standhardinger 13; Asts: Clarkson 9		Pts: Nakamura 16; Rebs: Schafer 8 Asts: Nakamura 11

Gelora Bung Karno Basketball Hall, Jakarta
Referees: Yuen Chun Yip (HKG), Mohammad Doust (IRI), Kim Jong-kuk (KOR)

31 August
18:30

Philippines	109–55	Syria
Scoring by quarter: 38–16, 22–18, 31–10, 18–11
Pts: Clarkson 29; Rebs: Standhardinger 15; Asts: Ahanmisi 7		Pts: Al-Jabi 23; Rebs: Al-Hamwi, Al-Osh 6 Asts: Al-Osh 4

Istora Gelora Bung Karno, Jakarta
Referees: Harja Jaladri (INA), Alexey Stepanenko (KAZ), Haryanto Sutaryo (INA)

== Exhibition games ==
November 19

Report

Philippines	92–99	Jordan
Scoring by quarter: 13–25, 31–21, 23–24, 25–28

Meralco Gym, Pasig

November 21

Report

Philippines	82–73	Jordan
Scoring by quarter: –, –, –, –game abandoned^{2}

Meralco Gym, Pasig

November 23

Report

Philippines	68–74	Lebanon

UP Epsilon Chi Center, Quezon City
Attendance: 400

November 25

Report

Philippines	60–71	Lebanon

Meralco Gym, Pasig

^{2} The match was abandoned in the fourth quarter with 6:26 minutes remaining following arguments between Philippines coach Yeng Guiao and Jordan coach Joseph Steibing following a Jordanian player throwing a ball at Filipino player Scottie Thompson during a dead ball situation. Tensions began as early as the second quarter when Christian Standhardinger was hard fouled by a Jordanian player. Steibing called off the game.

== Rosters ==
=== 2019 FIBA Basketball World Cup qualification (Asia) – First Round ===
February

Versus Australia
A 14-man roster was revealed by head coach, Chot Reyes on February 18, 2018 for the Australia game to be held February 22 in Melbourne. A final lineup of 12 players is set to be announced. On February 21, Jayson Castro and Jio Jalalon were excluded from the final 12-man roster due to injury concerns.

Philippines men's national basketball team – 2019 FIBA Basketball World Cup qualification roster
Players
Coaches

Pos.	No.	Name	Age – Date of birth	Height	Club	Ctr.
PG	1	Kiefer Ravena	24 – October 27, 1993	1.80 m (5 ft 11 in)	NLEX Road Warriors	(Philippines)
PF	4	Carl Bryan Cruz	26 – August 21, 1991	1.94 m (6 ft 4 in)	Alaska Aces	(Philippines)
G/F	5	Gabe Norwood (C)	33 – February 9, 1985	1.98 m (6 ft 6 in)	Rain or Shine Elasto Painters	(Philippines)
PG	6	Kevin Alas	26 – November 13, 1991	1.78 m (5 ft 10 in)	NLEX Road Warriors	(Philippines)
SF	8	Calvin Abueva	30 – February 4, 1988	1.88 m (6 ft 2 in)	Alaska Aces	(Philippines)
C	11	Andray Blatche (NP)	31 – August 22, 1986	2.11 m (6 ft 11 in)	Xinjiang Flying Tigers	(China)
C	15	June Mar Fajardo	28 – November 17, 1989	2.12 m (6 ft 11 in)	San Miguel Beermen	(Philippines)
SG	16	Roger Pogoy	25 – June 16, 1992	1.88 m (6 ft 2 in)	TNT KaTropa	(Philippines)
G/F	22	Allein Malicsi	30 – September 18, 1987	1.91 m (6 ft 3 in)	Blackwater Elite	(Philippines)
PF	24	Abu Tratter	25 – January 9, 1993	1.96 m (6 ft 5 in)	Marinerong Pilipino	(Philippines)
F/C	25	Japeth Aguilar	31 – January 25, 1987	2.06 m (6 ft 9 in)	Barangay Ginebra San Miguel	(Philippines)
SG	35	Matthew Wright	27 – February 7, 1991	1.94 m (6 ft 4 in)	Phoenix Fuel Masters	(Philippines)

Head coach

- (Philippines) Chot Reyes

Assistant coach(es)

- (Philippines) Joshua Vincent Reyes
- (Philippines) Jong Uichico

Team manager

- (Philippines) Butch Antonio

Legend

- (C) Team captain
- (NP) Naturalized player
- Club – describes last
  club before the tournament
- Age – describes age
  on 22 February 2018

Versus Japan
Kevin Alas, Carl Brian Cruz and Abu Tratter, who played in the Australia game were replaced for the national team's match against Japan. The three were replaced by Jayson Castro, Jio Jalalon, and Troy Rosario, who were previously not fielded due to injuries.

Philippines men's national basketball team – 2019 FIBA Basketball World Cup qualification roster
Players
Coaches

Pos.	No.	Name	Age – Date of birth	Height	Club	Ctr.
PG	1	Kiefer Ravena	24 – October 27, 1993	1.87 m (6 ft 2 in)	NLEX Road Warriors	(Philippines)
G/F	5	Gabe Norwood	33 – February 9, 1985	2.01 m (6 ft 7 in)	Rain or Shine Elasto Painters	(Philippines)
PG	7	Jayson William	31 – June 30, 1986	1.84 m (6 ft 0 in)	TNT KaTropa	(Philippines)
SF	8	Calvin Abueva	30 – February 4, 1988	2.02 m (6 ft 8 in)	Alaska Aces	(Philippines)
C	11	Andray Blatche (NP)	31 – August 22, 1986	2.13 m (7 ft 0 in)	Xinjiang Flying Tigers	(China)
C	15	June Mar Fajardo	28 – November 17, 1989	2.12 m (6 ft 11 in)	San Miguel Beermen	(Philippines)
SG	16	Roger Pogoy	25 – June 16, 1992	1.96 m (6 ft 5 in)	TNT KaTropa	(Philippines)
G/F	22	Allein Malicsi	30 – September 18, 1987	1.99 m (6 ft 6 in)	Blackwater Elite	(Philippines)
F/C	25	Japeth Aguilar	31 – January 25, 1987	2.14 m (7 ft 0 in)	Barangay Ginebra San Miguel	(Philippines)
G/F	35	Matthew Wright	27 – February 7, 1991	1.98 m (6 ft 6 in)	Phoenix Fuel Masters	(Philippines)
PG	–	Jio Jalalon	25 – August 2, 1992	1.83 m (6 ft 0 in)	Magnolia Hotshots	(Philippines)
PF	–	Troy Rosario	25 – June 20, 1992	2.04 m (6 ft 8 in)	TNT KaTropa	(Philippines)

Head coach

- (Philippines) Chot Reyes

Assistant coach(es)

- (Philippines) Joshua Vincent Reyes
- (Philippines) Jong Uichico

Team manager

- (Philippines) Butch Antonio

Legend

- (C) Team captain
- (NP) Naturalized player
- Club – describes last
  club before the tournament
- Age – describes age
  on 25 February 2018

== See also ==
- 2017 Philippines national basketball team results

Preceded by 2017	Philippines national basketball team results 2018	Succeeded by 2019
