= Evlin Abdullah-Khalifa =

Bahraini model

Evlin Khalifa is a Bahraini model and beauty pageant titleholder who was crowned Miss Universe Bahrain 2022. She represented Bahrain at the 71st Miss Universe pageant, held on 14 January 2023 in New Orleans, Louisiana, United States. She was the second woman to represent Bahrain at the Miss Universe competition, following Manar Nadeem Deyani in 2021. In 2023, she was included in Forbes Middle East’s 30 Under 30 list under the Social Impact category.

== Early life ==
Abdullah-Khalifa was born to a Bahraini father and a Russian mother and grew up in Riffa, Bahrain, the country’s second-largest city.

== Career ==
=== Pageantry ===
Evlin was crowned Miss Universe Bahrain 2022 on 11 September 2022 after competing against six other finalists. She succeeded Manar “Jess” Nadeem Deyani, the inaugural Miss Universe Bahrain titleholder.

She represented Bahrain at the 71st Miss Universe pageant, held in January 2023 in New Orleans, Louisiana.

During the competition, she wore outfits designed by regional and international designers, including Harvey Cenit, Irena Soprano, and Furne One, in various pageant segments. She received international media coverage after appearing in a burkini during the swimsuit segment, accompanied by a cape bearing messages advocating equality and representation of Arab and Muslim women.

=== Modeling and performance ===
In October 2022, Evlin made her major runway debut at Arab Fashion Week in Dubai, walking for Filipino designer Furne One under the label Amato.

She has also been described in media reports as a pianist. During the Miss Universe 2022 events in New Orleans, she was selected as one of the delegates to participate in a jazz performance, performing “Canal Street Blues” by King Oliver’s Creole Jazz Band.

== Awards and recognitions ==
- Miss Universe Bahrain 2022
- Forbes Middle East 30 Under 30 – Social Impact (2023)

== Advocacy and public roles ==
Evlin has been associated with Smile Train, a charitable organization that supports surgical care for children with cleft lip and palate

She has also served as an ambassador for the Children’s Cancer Center of Lebanon, which provides treatment and support for children and adolescents with cancer.

In 2023, Forbes Middle East cited her work related to education initiatives and social impact in its 30 Under 30 list.
