= 2019 Philippines men's national basketball team results =

The Philippines men's national basketball team, led by head coach Yeng Guiao secured their qualification in the 2019 FIBA Basketball World Cup in the second round of the Asian qualifiers. The national team were drawn in Group D for the group phase of the FIBA Basketball World Cup with Serbia, Italy, and Angola.

A squad with a different composition from the FIBA Basketball World Cup team will also participate in the 2019 Southeast Asian Games to be hosted at home in the Philippines.

== Record ==
Competition	Result	GP	W	L
FIBA Basketball World Cup	32nd Place	5	0	5
Southeast Asian Games	Champions	5	5	0

== Tournaments ==
=== FIBA Basketball World Cup qualification ===
Phase: Second round

February 21
19:00

Boxscore

Qatar	46–84	Philippines
Scoring by quarter: 11–15, 10–16, 9–31, 16–22
Pts: Saeed 10; Rebs: Saeed 8 Asts: Suliman 3		Pts: Blatche 17; Rebs: Blatche 15; Asts: Blatche 7

Al-Gharafa Sports Club Multi-Purpose Hall, Doha
Attendance: 3,272
Referees: Hwang In-tae (KOR), Yu Jung (TPE), Ahmed Al-Shuwaili (IRQ)

February 24
20:30

Boxscore

Kazakhstan	75–93	Philippines
Scoring by quarter: 21–22, 19–23, 20–26, 15–22
Pts: Clemmons 27; Rebs: Murzagaliyev, Yergali 6 Asts: Clemmons 9		Pts: Blatche 41; Rebs: Blatche 13; Asts: four players 3

Saryarka Velodrome, Astana
Attendance: 2,392
Referees: Duan Zhu (CHN), Ye Nan (CHN), Park Kyoung-jin (KOR)

=== Group phase ===
31 August 2019
19:30

Boxscore

Philippines	62–108	Italy
Scoring by quarter: 8–37, 16–25, 15–23, 23–23
Pts: Blatche, Perez 15; Rebs: Blatche 10; Asts: Perez 3		Pts: Datome, Della Valle 17; Rebs: Tessitori 8 Asts: Vitali 5

Foshan International Sports and Cultural Center, Foshan
Attendance: 10,500
Referees: Steve Anderson (USA), Yohan Rosso (FRA), Yu Jung (TPE)

2 September 2019
19:30

Boxscore

Serbia	126–67	Philippines
Scoring by quarter: 28–13, 34–22, 37–13, 27–19
Pts: Bjelica 20; Rebs: Jokić 7 Asts: Jokić, Micić 7		Pts: Perez 16; Rebs: Fajardo 6 Asts: Blatche 6

Foshan International Sports and Cultural Center, Foshan
Attendance: 10,000
Referees: Guilherme Locatelli (BRA), Yu Jung (TPE), Yohan Rosso (FRA)

September 4
15:30

Boxscore

Angola	84–81 (OT)	Philippines
Scoring by quarter: 21–20, 17–14, 18–12, 17–27, Overtime: 11–8
Pts: Joaquim 20; Rebs: Moreira 15; Asts: Paulo 6		Pts: Blatche 23; Rebs: Blatche 12; Asts: Ravena 4

Foshan International Sports and Cultural Center, Foshan
Attendance: 5,500
Referees: Guilherme Locatelli (BRA), Yevgeniy Mikheyev (KAZ), Scott Beker (AUS)

=== Classification round ===
September 6
20:00

Boxscore

Tunisia	86–67	Philippines
Scoring by quarter: 27–10, 19–14, 21–15, 19–28
Pts: Abada 16; Rebs: Mejri 12; Asts: Roll 4		Pts: Blatche 24; Rebs: Blatche 11; Asts: five players 2

Wukesong Arena, Beijing
Referees: Matthew Kallio (CAN), Boris Krejić (SVN), Harja Jaladri (IDN)

September 8
20:00

Boxscore

Iran	95–75	Philippines
Scoring by quarter: 30–24, 18–10, 27–16, 20–25
Pts: Haddadi 19; Rebs: Haddadi 7 Asts: Jamshidi, Yakhchali 5		Pts: Bolick 15; Rebs: Blatche 5 Asts: Blatche 5

Wukesong Arena, Beijing
Referees: Matthew Kallio (CAN), Scott Beker (AUS), Nicolas Fernandes (TAH)

=== Málaga pocket tournament ===
The Philippines participated at a pocket tournament in the port city of Málaga in Spain as part of their preparations for the World Cup.

August 9
22:00

Report

DR Congo	82–71	Philippines
Scoring by quarter: 18-21, 14-12, 26-22, 24-16
Pts: Mvouika 21		Pts: Bolick 21

Palacio de Deportes José María Martín Carpena, Málaga

August 10

Report

Ivory Coast	63–73	Philippines
Scoring by quarter: 13-17, 26–22, 27–27, 21–21
Pts: Thompson 20		Pts: Bolick 19

Palacio de Deportes José María Martín Carpena, Málaga

=== Southeast Asian Games ===
To be announced

== Exhibition games ==
August 6

Report

DR Congo	80–102	Philippines

Palacio Multiusos de Guadalajara, Guadalajara

August 7

Report

Ivory Coast	83–94	Philippines

Palacio Multiusos de Guadalajara, Guadalajara

August 23

Report

Philippines	92–83	(Australia) Adelaide 36ers
Scoring by quarter: 25–16, 25–33, 23–19, 19–15
Pts: Blatche 19		Pts: Moore 16

Meralco Gym, Pasig

August 25

Report

Philippines	75–85	(Australia) Adelaide 36ers
Scoring by quarter: 13–29, 17–15, 18–23, 27–18
Pts: Blatche 16		Pts: Johnson 16

Meralco Gym, Pasig

== Roster ==
=== 2019 FIBA Basketball World Cup ===
Philippines national basketball team – 2019 FIBA Basketball World Cup roster
Players
Coaches

Pos.	No.	Name	Age – Date of birth	Height	Club	Ctr.
PG	3	Paul John Dalistan	31 – February 14, 1988	6 ft 0 in (1.83 m)	Magnolia Hotshots	(Philippines)
PG	4	Kiefer Isaac Ravena	25 – October 27, 1993	6 ft 0 in (1.83 m)	NLEX Road Warriors	(Philippines)
SF	5	Gabriel Daniel Norwood (C)	34 – February 9, 1985	6 ft 6 in (1.98 m)	Rain or Shine Elasto Painters	(Philippines)
SG	8	Robert Bolick	23 – September 13, 1995	6 ft 1 in (1.85 m)	NorthPort Batang Pier	(Philippines)
C	11	Andray Blatche (NP)	33 – August 22, 1986	6 ft 11 in (2.11 m)	Tianjin Gold Lions	(China)
PG	14	Andy Mark Barroca	27 – April 25, 1992	5 ft 10 in (1.78 m)	Magnolia Hotshots	(Philippines)
C	15	June Mar Fajardo	29 – November 17, 1989	6 ft 10 in (2.08 m)	San Miguel Beermen	(Philippines)
SG	16	Roger Ray Pogoy	27 – June 16, 1992	6 ft 2 in (1.88 m)	TNT KaTropa	(Philippines)
SG	17	Christian Jaymar Perez	25 – November 17, 1993	6 ft 2 in (1.88 m)	Columbian Dyip	(Philippines)
PF	18	Jeth Troy Rosario	27 – January 20, 1992	6 ft 7 in (2.01 m)	TNT KaTropa	(Philippines)
C	20	Raymond Almazan	30 – August 2, 1989	6 ft 8 in (2.03 m)	Meralco Bolts	(Philippines)
PF	25	Japeth Paul Aguilar	32 – January 25, 1987	6 ft 9 in (2.06 m)	Barangay Ginebra San Miguel	(Philippines)

Head coach

- (Philippines) Yeng Guiao

Assistant coach(es)

- (Philippines) Ford Arao
- (Philippines) Caloy Garcia
- (Philippines) Ryan Gregorio

Legend

- (C) Team captain
- Club – describes last
  club before the tournament
- Age – describes age
  on 31 August 2019

== See also ==
- 2018 Philippines national basketball team results

Preceded by 2018	Philippines national basketball team results 2019	Succeeded by 2020
