= 2022 Philippines men's national basketball team results =

- Head coach: Chot Reyes (February–May); Nenad Vucinic (June–July); Chot Reyes (July–)
- Biggest win: Cambodia 32–100 Philippines (Hanoi, Vietnam; May 17)
- Biggest defeat: Philippines 60–106 New Zealand (Auckland, New Zealand; June 30)

The Philippines national basketball team was led by head coach Chot Reyes in the early part of 2022 until the appointment of Nenad Vucinic in June.

The Samahang Basketbol ng Pilipinas announced Reyes' appointment as head coach of the team on January 31 following Tab Baldwin's departure shortly prior to the February 2022 window of the 2023 FIBA Basketball World Cup qualifiers. Baldwin's departure was unexpected with Reyes tasked to prepare the team on short notice.

Reyes was able to lead the team to a win against India but lost a game to New Zealand. South Korea who were part of the same group had to withdraw after it forfeited two games due to some of its players testing positive for COVID-19 pursuant to COVID-19 pandemic-related protocols.

The Philippines took part in the 2021 Southeast Asian Games in Vietnam which was postponed by a year due to the pandemic. The team settled for silver, with Indonesia winning the gold medal. The result was considered an upset; the only other time the Philippines did not win the title was in the 1989 edition.

In June, Nenad Vucinic who has been Reyes' assistant coach was designated as head coach of the Philippines for the June-July 2022 window of the World Cup qualifiers.

Reyes would return as the team's head coach for the 2022 FIBA Asia Cup.

== Tournaments ==
=== 2023 FIBA Basketball World Cup qualification (Asia) ===
February 25
18:00

Boxscore

India	64–88	Philippines
Scoring by quarter: 13–18, 19–26, 15–24, 17–20
Pts: Sekhon 14; Rebs: Rawat 10; Asts: Muthu Krishnan 5		Pts: Ramos 17; Rebs: Kouame 9 Asts: Gómez de Liaño, Ramos 3

Araneta Coliseum, Quezon City
Attendance: 2,000
Referees: Mohamed Al-Salam (BHR), Suebpong Wichaipin (THA), Budi Marfan (INA)

February 27
19:00

Boxscore

New Zealand	88–63	Philippines
Scoring by quarter: 22–19, 18–11, 25–18, 23–15
Pts: Prewster, Vodanovich 20; Rebs: Loe, Vodanovich 10; Asts: Prewster 6		Pts: Ravena 23; Rebs: Ramos 10; Asts: Ravena 5

Araneta Coliseum, Quezon City
Attendance: 3,114
Referees: Takaki Kato (JPN), Christopher Reid (AUS), Daigo Urushima (JPN)

June 30
19:30

Boxscore

Philippines	60–106	New Zealand
Scoring by quarter: 13–23, 8–24, 22–26, 17–33
Pts: Tamayo 16; Rebs: Ramos 9 Asts: Ramos 4		Pts: Prewster 15; Rebs: Vodanovich 9 Asts: Webster 5

Eventfinda Stadium, Auckland
Attendance: 3,827
Referees: Takaki Kato (JPN), Vaughan Mayberry (AUS), Yuen Chun Yip (HKG)

July 3
19:00

Boxscore

Philippines	79–63	India
Scoring by quarter: 21–10, 24–14, 20–20, 14–19
Pts: Ramos 21; Rebs: Chiu 11; Asts: Quiambao 6		Pts: Hafeez 13; Rebs: Aryan, Goti 7 Asts: Sekhon 5

SM Mall of Asia Arena, Pasay
Attendance: 5,307
Referees: Mohamed Al-Salam (BHR), Suebpong Wichaipin (THA), Haryanto Sutaryo (INA)

August 25
21:00

Boxscore

Lebanon	85–81	Philippines
Scoring by quarter: 22–25, 27–22, 19–16, 17–18
Pts: Arakji 24; Rebs: Haidar 9 Asts: Gyokchyan, Haidar 4		Pts: Clarkson 27; Rebs: Ramos 10; Asts: Clarkson 7

Stade Nouhad Naufal, Zouk Mikael
Attendance: 7,477
Referees: Yevgeniy Mikheyev (KAZ), Mohammad Doost (IRI), Wissam Zein (SYR)

August 29
19:00

Boxscore

Philippines	84–46	Saudi Arabia
Scoring by quarter: 11–14, 26–14, 24–8, 23–10
Pts: Clarkson 23; Rebs: Sotto 13; Asts: Clarkson 6		Pts: three players 9 Rebs: Mo. Al-Marwani 8 Asts: Abdel Gabar 9

SM Mall of Asia Arena, Pasay
Attendance: 19,829
Referees: Takaki Kato (JPN), Christopher Reid (AUS), Chuang Chih-chun (TPE)

November 10
19:00

Boxscore

Jordan	66–74	Philippines
Scoring by quarter: 20–21, 21–16, 10–21, 15–16
Pts: Tucker 23; Rebs: Al-Dwairi 16; Asts: Ibrahim 6		Pts: Sotto 16; Rebs: Thompson 13; Asts: Thompson 8

Prince Hamzah Hall, Amman
Attendance: 5,000
Referees: Yevgeniy Mikheyev (KAZ), Wissam Zein (SYR), Chan Owe Shiong (MAS)

November 13
19:00

Boxscore

Saudi Arabia	63–76	Philippines
Scoring by quarter: 16–16, 9–15, 20–24, 18–21
Pts: Ma. Al-Marwani 19; Rebs: Ma. Al-Marwani 8 Asts: Abdel Gabar 5		Pts: Pogoy, Ramos 13; Rebs: Sotto, Thompson 9 Asts: Ramos 4

King Abdullah Sports City Hall, Jeddah
Attendance: 9,500
Referees: Ahmed Al-Shuwaili (IRQ), James Boyer (AUS), Alexey Stepanenko (KAZ)

=== 2021 Southeast Asian Games ===
May 16
15:00

Philippines	76–73	Thailand
Scoring by quarter: 13–21, 25–13, 20–18, 18–21

Thanh Trì District Sporting Hall, Hanoi

May 17
17:00

Cambodia	32–100	Philippines
Scoring by quarter: 9–32, 8–25, 6–14, 9–29

Thanh Trì District Sporting Hall, Hanoi

May 18
15:00

Philippines	88–37	Singapore
Scoring by quarter: 17–7, 26–10, 18–10, 27–10

Thanh Trì District Sporting Hall, Hanoi

May 19
19:00

Vietnam	60–88	Philippines
Scoring by quarter: 17-20, 16-22, 14-20, 13-26

Thanh Trì District Sporting Hall, Hanoi

May 21
11:00

Philippines	87–44	Malaysia
Scoring by quarter: 19–10, 20–12, 29–11, 19–11

Thanh Trì District Sporting Hall, Hanoi

May 22
15:00

Indonesia	85–81	Philippines
Scoring by quarter: 18–14, 18–18, 27–28, 22–21

Thanh Trì District Sporting Hall, Hanoi

=== 2022 FIBA Asia Cup ===
13 July 2022
20:00

Boxscore

Lebanon	95–80	Philippines
Scoring by quarter: 22–27, 24–12, 33–19, 16–22
Pts: Arakji 20; Rebs: Gyokchyan 8 Asts: Arakji 4		Pts: Belangel 17; Rebs: Tamayo 6 Asts: Quiambao, K. Ravena 4

Istora Gelora Bung Karno, Jakarta
Attendance: 200
Referees: Yu Jung (TPE), James Boyer (AUS), Park Kyoung-jin (KOR)

15 July 2022
15:00

Boxscore

Philippines	101–59	India
Scoring by quarter: 20–13, 31–20, 31–10, 19–16
Pts: Navarro 18; Rebs: Lopez, T. Ravena 5 Asts: Quiambao 9		Pts: Hafeez 14; Rebs: Rawat 9 Asts: Hafeez 3

Istora Gelora Bung Karno, Jakarta
Attendance: 100
Referees: Takaki Kato (JPN), Yevgeniy Mikheyev (KAZ), Zhang Xiao (CHN)

17 July 2022
20:00

Boxscore

Philippines	75–92	New Zealand
Scoring by quarter: 16–30, 22–16, 14–21, 23–25
Pts: K. Ravena 17; Rebs: K. Ravena 6 Asts: four players 3		Pts: Cameron 18; Rebs: Mennenga 14; Asts: Smith-Milner 5

Istora Gelora Bung Karno, Jakarta
Attendance: 852
Referees: Mohammad Al-Amiri (KUW), Harja Jaladri (INA), Zhang Xiao (CHN)

19 July 2022
20:00

Boxscore

Japan	102–81	Philippines
Scoring by quarter: 32–16, 18–18, 27–29, 25–18
Pts: Togashi 18; Rebs: Watanabe 9 Asts: Togashi 6		Pts: Parks 16; Rebs: Quiambao 7 Asts: four players 3

Istora Gelora Bung Karno, Jakarta
Attendance: 1,000
Referees: Rabah Noujaim (LBN), Ahmed Al-Shuwaili (IRQ), Mohammad Doost (IRI)

== Exhibition games ==
June 17

Report

South Korea	96–92	Philippines
Scoring by quarter: 16–14, 18–29, 37–20, 25–29
Pts: Heo H., Yeo J. 17		Pts: Ravena 22

Anyang Gymnasium, Anyang

June 18

Report

South Korea	106–102	Philippines
Scoring by quarter: 25–31, 22–22, 35–21, 24–28
Pts: Ratliffe 27		Pts: Ramos 31

Anyang Gymnasium, Anyang

== Rosters ==
=== Southeast Asian Games ===
The following was the roster of the Philippines national team for the 2021 Southeast Asian Games in Vietnam

Philippines national basketball team – 2021 Southeast Asian Games roster
Players
Coaches

Pos.	No.	Name	Age – Date of birth	Height	Club	Ctr.
G	0	Thirdy Ravena	25 – December 17, 1996	1.91 m (6 ft 3 in)	San-en NeoPhoenix	(Japan)
G	1	Kib Montalbo	26 – April 2, 1996	1.78 m (5 ft 10 in)	TNT Tropang Giga	(Philippines)
G	4	Kiefer Ravena	28 – October 27, 1993	1.83 m (6 ft 0 in)	Shiga Lakestars	(Japan)
G	7	Jaydee Tungcab	25 – May 5, 1997	1.92 m (6 ft 4 in)	TNT Tropang Giga	(Philippines)
F/C	9	Moala Tautuaa	33 – April 30, 1989	2.03 m (6 ft 8 in)	San Miguel Beermen	(Philippines)
F/C	11	Isaac Go	25 – June 7, 1996	2.00 m (6 ft 7 in)	Terrafirma Dyip	(Philippines)
C	15	June Mar Fajardo	32 – November 17, 1989	2.08 m (6 ft 10 in)	San Miguel Beermen	(Philippines)
G/F	16	Roger Pogoy	29 – June 16, 1992	1.88 m (6 ft 2 in)	TNT Tropang Giga	(Philippines)
G/F	17	Francis Lopez	18 – May 17, 2003	1.94 m (6 ft 4 in)	Free agent
F	18	Troy Rosario	30 – January 20, 1992	2.00 m (6 ft 7 in)	TNT Tropang Giga	(Philippines)
F	23	William Navarro	25 – February 3, 1997	1.99 m (6 ft 6 in)	NorthPort Batang Pier	(Philippines)
G/F	35	Matthew Wright	31 – February 7, 1991	1.93 m (6 ft 4 in)	Phoenix Super LPG Fuel Masters	(Philippines)

Head coach

- (Philippines) Chot Reyes

Assistant coach(es)

- (Philippines) Jong Uichico
- (Philippines) Joshua Reyes

Legend

- (C) Team captain
- (NP) Naturalized player
- Club – describes last
  club before the tournament
- Age – describes age
  on May 16, 2022

=== FIBA Asian Cup ===
The following was the roster of the Philippines national team for the 2022 FIBA Asia Cup

Philippines national basketball team – 2022 FIBA Asia Cup roster
Players
Coaches

Pos.	No.	Name	Age – Date of birth	Height	Club	Ctr.
G	0	Thirdy Ravena	25 – December 17, 1996	1.89 m (6 ft 2 in)	San-en NeoPhoenix	(Japan)
G	1	Bobby Ray Parks Jr.	29 – February 19, 1993	1.93 m (6 ft 4 in)	Nagoya Diamond Dolphins	(Japan)
G	3	RJ Abarrientos	22 – September 14, 1999	1.81 m (5 ft 11 in)	Ulsan Hyundai Mobis Phoebus	(South Korea)
C	7	Poy Erram	33 – July 7, 1989	2.07 m (6 ft 9 in)	TNT Tropang Giga	(Philippines)
G/F	10	Rhenz Abando	24 – March 11, 1998	1.88 m (6 ft 2 in)	Letran Knights	(Philippines)
G	15	Kiefer Ravena	28 – October 27, 1993	1.85 m (6 ft 1 in)	Shiga Lakes	(Japan)
F	17	LeBron Lopez	19 – May 17, 2003	1.96 m (6 ft 5 in)	Free agent
C	18	Geo Chiu	21 – May 18, 2001	2.03 m (6 ft 8 in)	Ateneo Blue Eagles	(Philippines)
F	23	William Navarro	25 – February 3, 1997	1.99 m (6 ft 6 in)	Seoul Samsung Thunders	(South Korea)
G	27	SJ Belangel	23 – June 27, 1999	1.77 m (5 ft 10 in)	Daegu KOGAS Pegasus	(South Korea)
F	28	Kevin Quiambao	21 – April 22, 2001	2.04 m (6 ft 8 in)	De La Salle Green Archers	(Philippines)
F/C	33	Carl Tamayo	21 – February 13, 2001	2.01 m (6 ft 7 in)	UP Fighting Maroons	(Philippines)

Head coach

- (Philippines) Chot Reyes

Assistant coach(es)

- (New Zealand) Nenad Vučinić
- (Philippines) Jong Uichico

Legend

- (C) Team captain
- Club – describes last
  club before the tournament
- Age – describes age
  on July 13, 2022

Preceded by 2021	Philippines national basketball team results 2022	Succeeded by 2023
