= Manar Nadeem Deyani =

Bahraini beauty pageant titleholder

Manar Deyani
- Born: Bahrain
- Occupations: model; fashion designer
- Height: 155 cm (5 ft 1 in)
- Beauty pageant titleholder
- Title: Miss Universe Bahrain 2021
- Major competition: Miss Universe 2021

Manar Nadeem Deyani is a Bahraini model and beauty pageant titleholder, who was crowned the first Miss Universe Bahrain 2021.

== Early life and career ==
Manar was born in Riffa, Bahrain. She moved to Dubai when she was 18-years-old. Manar is the eldest of 4 of siblings. She works as a fashion model.

== Miss Universe Bahrain 2021 ==
Deyani won the title of Miss Universe Bahrain at the inaugural ceremony hosted in the Bahrain.

After winning the title, Deyani said, "I may be the shortest candidate in the history of Miss Universe, but I stand tall representing a country of love, peace and kindness – your first ever Miss Universe Bahrain".

== Miss Universe 2021 ==
As the winner of Miss Universe Bahrain 2021, Manar Nadeem Deyani competed in the Miss Universe 2021. Despite her participation, she did not achieve a placement in the competition.

Awards and achievements
Preceded by Inaugural	Miss Universe Bahrain; 2021	Succeeded by Evlin Abdulla Khalifa
