= Dwight Ramos =

Filipino-American basketball player

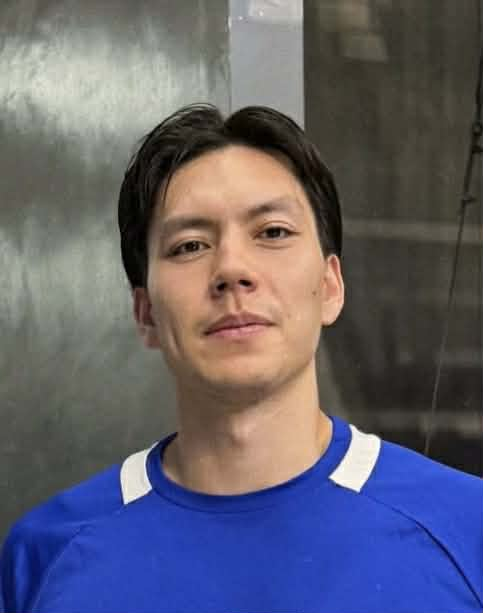
- Ramos in 2026

No. 2 – Levanga Hokkaido
- Position: Shooting guard / point guard
- League: B.League

Personal information
- Born: September 2, 1998 (age 28) West Covina, California, U.S.
- Listed height: 6 ft 4 in (1.93 m)
- Listed weight: 210 lb (95 kg)

Career information
- High school: Walnut (Walnut, California)
- College: Cal State Fullerton (2016–2018); Cal Poly Pomona (2018–2019); Ateneo (2019)
- Playing career: 2021–present

Career history
- 2021–2022: Toyama Grouses
- 2022–present: Levanga Hokkaido

Career highlights
- PCCL champion (2019)

Dwight Ramos (born September 2, 1998) is a Filipino professional basketball player for the Levanga Hokkaido of the B.League. Born in the United States, he represented the Philippines in several international competitions. Ramos played college basketball for the Ateneo Blue Eagles of the University Athletic Association of the Philippines (UAAP).

== Early life and education ==
Dwight Ramos was born on September 2, 1998 in West Covina, California in the United States to Artemio and Liliya Ramos. His father is originally from Narvacan, Ilocos Sur while his mother is from Russia. He is the eldest of three children.

Dwight Ramos attended Walnut High School, graduating in 2016. Ramos then pursued a degree in business at the California State University, Fullerton. He later moved to the California State Polytechnic University before going to the Philippines to study at the Ateneo de Manila University.

== High school career ==
Ramos started taking basketball seriously in eighth grade. He went to Mater Dei High School, an athletic powerhouse where he had NBA lottery pick Stanley Johnson as his teammate. Due to the commute to Mater Dei taking too much time, his grades started to slip. This led to him transferring to Walnut High School, which was closer to his home. He played for the Walnut Mustangs, the high school varsity basketball team then coached by Joe Khouzam.

== College career ==
=== US NCAA ===
While Ramos was still in high school, he was contacted by coaches Tab Baldwin and Franz Pumaren who tried to recruit him to play in the Philippines for Ateneo de Manila University's Blue Eagles and Adamson University's Soaring Falcons respectively. However he decided to forego from playing for Ateneo to continue his college basketball career in the United States.

Ramos during his attendance at Fullerton campus of California State University played for the Cal State Fullerton Titans basketball team. He suited up for the team in the NCAA Division I from 2016 to 2018. He then went on to play for the Broncos of California State Polytechnic University in Pomona for one season in the NCAA Division II.

=== Ateneo Blue Eagles ===
After playing for the Cal State Pomona Broncos, Ramos went to the Philippines to play for the Ateneo Blue Eagles in the UAAP but had to serve residency in 2019 before he could suit up in official UAAP games. He played for the Ateneo in the Philippine Collegiate Champions League helping the team clinch the 2019 league title. He was expected to make his UAAP debut for the Blue Eagles in Season 83 which was cancelled due to the COVID-19 pandemic. He became eligible to enter the PBA draft in 2021, but decided to forego from entering for a chance to play alongside his brother in the Ateneo.

== Professional career ==
=== Toyama Grouses (2021–2022) ===
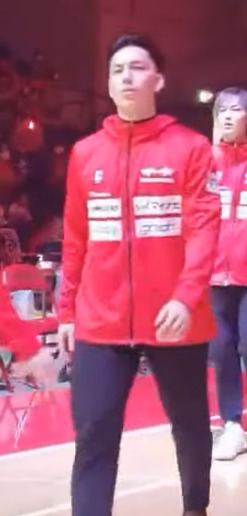
Ramos with the Toyama Grouses in 2021

Ramos decided to forgo his one year of eligibility in UAAP and he signed with Toyama Grouses of the Japanese B.League on September 10, 2021. Ramos played only for the 2021–22 season with his team finishing 7th in the west conference. Toyama did not renew his contract.

=== Levanga Hokkaido (2022–present) ===
Ramos remained in the B.League, joining Levanga Hokkaido in May 2022. He averaged 10.0 points, 3.9 rebounds, and 2.3 assists per game during his first season with the team.

On June 6, 2023, he signed a contract extension with the team.

In April 2024, Ramos suffered an orbital floor fracture during Levanga Hokkaido's loss to Utsunomiya Brex in the Japan B.League. Later that year, he was named team co-captain, serving with Ren Shimatani.

== National team career ==
Ramos has been a prospective member of the Philippines national team by its management as early 2018, when he was included in a 23-member pool intended for the 2023 FIBA World Cup. He debuted for the Philippines in February 2020, playing in the 2021 FIBA Asia Cup qualifier match against Indonesia. The Philippines won 100–70 in that match with Ramos contributing 5 points, 5 rebounds, and 2 steals. Ramos played with a squad reinforced by PBA players in the first window of the qualifiers. Due to the COVID-19 pandemic, subsequent qualifier matches were repeatedly postponed with Ramos flying back and forth between the Philippines and the United States, usually training in the latter where pandemic-related protocols are more lenient.

Ramos was included in the 21-man pool for the 2023 FIBA World Cup, where he was eventually included in the final 12-man lineup.

== Personal life ==
Since 2020, Ramos has been in a relationship with professional volleyball player Kim Kianna Dy.

Ramos is second cousins with Miss Universe Bahrain 2022 Evlin Abdullah-Khalifa, through their mothers, who are first cousins.

== Career statistics ==
Legend
GP	Games played	GS	Games started	MPG	Minutes per game
FG%	Field goal percentage	3P%	3-point field goal percentage	FT%	Free throw percentage
RPG	Rebounds per game	APG	Assists per game	SPG	Steals per game
BPG	Blocks per game	PPG	Points per game		Led the league

=== B.League ===
Year	Team	GP	GS	MPG	FG%	3P%	FT%	RPG	APG	SPG	BPG	PPG
2021–22	Toyama	46	36	24.8	.417	.269	.759	3.9	2.3	1.1	0.3	10.0
2022–23	Levanga	43	38	26.5	.379	.316	.775	3.8	2.4	1.5	0.6	10.7
2023–24	Levanga	41	36	24.7	.368	.277	.738	3.8	2.8	1.7	0.5	9.5
