= Junior's (disambiguation) =

Junior's is a restaurant chain with the original location in Downtown Brooklyn, New York City, most famous for its cheesecake.

Junior's may also refer to:

- Junior's Eyes, British musical group
- Junior's Fashion Week (JFW), a bi-annual runway showcase held in various Indian cities
- "Junior's Farm", a song written by Paul and Linda McCartney and performed by Wings
- Junior's Grill (1948–2011), a restaurant in Atlanta, Georgia, USA

== See also ==
- Junior (disambiguation), including Juniors
