= JNR (disambiguation) =

JNR may refer to:

- Japanese National Railways
- Journal of Nanoparticle Research
- Joyful Noise Recordings
- Junior (disambiguation)
