= UAAP Season 76 basketball tournaments =

Basketball season

UAAP Season 76
- Host school: Adamson University
Men's Finals	G1	G2	G3 (OT)	Wins
De La Salle Green Archers	72	77	71	2
UST Growling Tigers	73	70	69	1
- Duration: October 2–12, 2013
- Arena(s): Smart Araneta Coliseum; Mall of Asia Arena
- Finals MVP: Jeron Teng
- Winning coach: Juno Sauler (1st title)
- Semifinalists: FEU Tamaraws; NU Bulldogs
- TV network(s): ABS-CBN, Studio 23, The Filipino Channel, Balls, Balls HD
Women's Finals	G1	G2	G3	Wins
NU Lady Bulldogs	48	67	61	1
De La Salle Lady Archers	72	52	69	2
- Duration: September 28–October 5, 2013
- Arena(s): Mall of Asia Arena; Smart Araneta Coliseum
- Finals MVP: Trisha Piatos
- Winning coach: Tyrone Bautista (1st title)
- Semifinalists: UST Growling Tigresses; Adamson Lady Falcons
- TV network(s): Studio 23
Juniors' Finals	G1 (OT)	G2	Wins
NUNS Bullpups	101	81	2+1
Ateneo Blue Eaglets	93	74	0
- Duration: October 6–9, 2013
- Arena(s): Filoil Flying V Arena
- Finals MVP: Hubert Cani
- Winning coach: Jeff Napa (2nd title)
- Semifinalists: FEU–D Baby Tamaraws; Zobel Junior Archers
- TV network(s): Studio 23 (delayed)

The basketball tournaments of UAAP Season 76 were held in school year 2013–14. Adamson University was both season host and basketball tournaments host. As season host, Adamson was the producer of the opening ceremony on June 29, 2013. As to being tournament host, Adamson was responsible for the scheduling of games, booking of game venues and distribution of game tickets to member schools. The other responsibility of Adamson as tournament host was the nomination of a basketball tournament commissioner to the UAAP Board for approval.

The first doubleheader of basketball games was held after the opening ceremonies at the Mall of Asia Arena. ABS-CBN UHF channel Studio 23 did the broadcast of the men's basketball tournament for the fourteenth consecutive year.

== Men's tournament ==
=== Teams ===
Team	University	Coach
Adamson Soaring Falcons	Adamson University (AdU)	(Philippines) Leo Austria
Ateneo Blue Eagles	Ateneo de Manila University (ADMU)	(Philippines) Bo Perasol
De La Salle Green Archers	De La Salle University (DLSU)	(Philippines) Juno Sauler
FEU Tamaraws	Far Eastern University (FEU)	(Philippines) Nash Racela
NU Bulldogs	National University (NU)	(Philippines) Eric Altamirano
UE Red Warriors	University of the East (UE)	(Philippines) Boyzie Zamar
UP Fighting Maroons	University of the Philippines Diliman (UP)	(Philippines) Rey Madrid
UST Growling Tigers	University of Santo Tomas (UST)	(Philippines) Pido Jarencio

==== Coaching changes ====
Team	Old coach	Reason	New coach
Ateneo	(United States) Norman Black	Appointed head coach of the Talk 'N Text Tropang Texters	(Philippines) Bo Perasol
La Salle	(Philippines) Gee Abanilla	Appointed head coach of the Petron Blaze Boosters	(Philippines) Juno Sauler
UP	(Philippines) Ricky Dandan	Resigned midseason	(Philippines) Rey Madrid

=== Elimination round ===
==== Team standings ====
Pos	Team	W	L	PCT	GB	Qualification
1	NU Bulldogs	10	4	.714 (Note: Head-to-head record: NU 2–2, La Salle 2–2, FEU 2–2 (NU +2, La Salle 0, FEU –2); second-seed playoff: La Salle 74–69 FEU)	—	Twice-to-beat in the semifinals
2	De La Salle Green Archers	10	4	.714	—	Twice-to-beat in the semifinals
3	FEU Tamaraws	10	4	.714	—	Twice-to-win in the semifinals
4	UST Growling Tigers	8	6	.571	2	Twice-to-win in the semifinals
5	Ateneo Blue Eagles	7	7	.500 (Note: Head-to-head record: Ateneo 1–1 UE (Ateneo +1))	3	
6	UE Red Warriors	7	7	.500	3	
7	Adamson Soaring Falcons (H)	4	10	.286	6	
8	UP Fighting Maroons	0	14	.000	10	

Source: ABS-CBN Sports
Rules for classification: 1) winning percentage; 2) if tied for #2 or #4, one-game playoff; 3) head-to-head record; 4) head-to-head point differential; 5) overall point differential
(H) Hosts

==== Schedule ====
	Round 1							Round 2						
Team ╲ Game	1	2	3	4	5	6	7	8	9	10	11	12	13	14
Adamson	UP school colors	UST school colors	UE school colors	Ateneo school colors	NU school colors	La Salle school colors	FEU school colors	La Salle school colors	NU school colors	Ateneo school colors	UST school colors	UP school colors	FEU school colors	UE school colors
Ateneo	NU school colors	FEU school colors	La Salle school colors	Adamson school colors	UE school colors	UP school colors	UST school colors	UP school colors	Adamson school colors	FEU school colors	La Salle school colors	UE school colors	NU school colors	UST school colors
La Salle	UST school colors	UP school colors	Ateneo school colors	FEU school colors	UE school colors	Adamson school colors	NU school colors	Adamson school colors	FEU school colors	UP school colors	Ateneo school colors	UE school colors	NU school colors	UST school colors
FEU	UE school colors	Ateneo school colors	UP school colors	La Salle school colors	NU school colors	UST school colors	Adamson school colors	NU school colors	La Salle school colors	UE school colors	Ateneo school colors	UST school colors	Adamson school colors	UP school colors
NU	Ateneo school colors	UE school colors	UST school colors	UP school colors	FEU school colors	Adamson school colors	La Salle school colors	FEU school colors	Adamson school colors	UST school colors	UE school colors	UP school colors	La Salle school colors	Ateneo school colors
UE	FEU school colors	NU school colors	Adamson school colors	UST school colors	Ateneo school colors	La Salle school colors	UP school colors	UST school colors	FEU school colors	NU school colors	La Salle school colors	Ateneo school colors	Adamson school colors	UP school colors
UP	Adamson school colors	La Salle school colors	FEU school colors	NU school colors	Ateneo school colors	UST school colors	UE school colors	Ateneo school colors	La Salle school colors	Adamson school colors	NU school colors	UST school colors	FEU school colors	UE school colors
UST	La Salle school colors	Adamson school colors	NU school colors	UE school colors	FEU school colors	UP school colors	Ateneo school colors	UE school colors	NU school colors	Adamson school colors	FEU school colors	UP school colors	La Salle school colors	Ateneo school colors

= Win; = OT win; = Loss; = OT loss

==== Results ====
Team	AdU	ADMU	DLSU	FEU	NU	UE	UP	UST
Adamson Soaring Falcons		59–71	67–70	71–74	68–66	78–71	79–67	62–67
Ateneo Blue Eagles	79–66		73–82	75–79*	54–64	68–72	72–64	61–57
De La Salle Green Archers	70–69*	66–64		79–83*	56–63	83–85	96–84	58–63*
FEU Tamaraws	92–80	73–92	66–75		87–83	89–78	75–57	77–67
NU Bulldogs	80–48	70–65	55–57	59–58		67–71	74–60	71–67
UE Red Warriors	77–60	72–77	65–75*	94–98**	73–81		62–57	77–88
UP Fighting Maroons	53–67	59–67	63–85	69–87	62–79	73–76		69–79
UST Growling Tigers	80–67	82–74	64–69	79–78**	61–75	67–68	63–39	

Legend: Blue = left column team win; Red = top row team win.
Matches with lighter background shading were decided after overtime.

=== Second seed playoff ===
Studio 23

September 21
3:30 p.m.

2nd seed

De La Salle Green Archers	74–69	FEU Tamaraws
Scoring by quarter: 18–11, 19–16, 23–22, 14–20
La Salle wins the twice–to–beat advantage

Mall of Asia Arena, Pasay

=== Bracket ===
Semifinals (Top 2 twice-to-beat)
1	NU	62	69
4	UST	71	76
2	La Salle	71
3	FEU	68

Finals (Best-of-three playoff)
4	UST	73	70	69
2	La Salle	72	77	71*

*Overtime

=== Semifinals ===
In the semifinals, the higher seed has the twice-to-beat advantage, where they only have to win once, while their opponents twice, to progress.

==== (1) NU vs. (4) UST ====
Studio 23

September 22
4:00 p.m.

NU Bulldogs	62–71	UST Growling Tigers
Scoring by quarter: 8–19, 15–20, 21–15, 18–17

Smart Araneta Coliseum, Quezon City

Studio 23

September 28
4:00 p.m.

NU Bulldogs	69–76	UST Growling Tigers
Scoring by quarter: 10–19, 21–12, 18–19, 20–26
UST wins series in two games

Mall of Asia Arena, Pasay
Attendance: 17,828

==== (2) La Salle vs. (3) FEU ====
The De La Salle Green Archers has the twice-to-beat advantage after beating the FEU Tamaraws for the second-seed, which leads to a virtual best-of-three playoff series.

Studio 23

September 25
4:00 p.m.

De La Salle Green Archers	71–68	FEU Tamaraws
Scoring by quarter: 18–21, 13–17, 21–18, 19–12
La Salle wins series in one game

Mall of Asia Arena, Pasay

=== Finals ===
Studio 23

October 2
4:00 p.m.

De La Salle Green Archers	72–73	UST Growling Tigers
Scoring by quarter: 13–23, 18–15, 23–12, 18–23

Smart Araneta Coliseum, Quezon City
Attendance: 20,525

ABS-CBN

October 5
4:00 p.m.

De La Salle Green Archers	77–70	UST Growling Tigers
Scoring by quarter: 21–12, 20–21, 23–20, 13–17

Smart Araneta Coliseum, Quezon City
Attendance: 23,037

ABS-CBN

October 12
4:00 p.m.

De La Salle Green Archers	71–69 (OT)	UST Growling Tigers
Scoring by quarter: 16–18, 8–14, 23–16, 18–17, Overtime: 6–4
La Salle wins series 2–1

Mall of Asia Arena, Pasay
Attendance: 23,305

- Finals Most Valuable Player: Jeron Teng (De La Salle Green Archers)

=== Awards ===
UAAP Season 76 men's basketball champions
De La Salle Green Archers
Eighth title
(13th title including NCAA championships)

- Most Valuable Player: Terrence Romeo (FEU Tamaraws)
- Rookie of the Year: Kyles Jefferson Lao (UP Fighting Maroons)
- Mythical Five:
  - Roi Sumang (UE Red Warriors)
  - Terrence Romeo (FEU Tamaraws)
  - Bobby Ray Parks Jr. (NU Bulldogs)
  - Jason Perkins (De La Salle Green Archers)
  - Karim Abdul (UST Growling Tigers)
- Suzuki Fast Break Player of the Season: Bobby Ray Parks Jr. (NU Bulldogs)
- Yellow Cab Big Man of the Season: Karim Abdul (UST Growling Tigers)
- RCBC Savings Bank Game Changing Player of the Season: Jeron Teng (De La Salle Green Archers)
- Jollibee Champ of the Season: Terrence Romeo (FEU Tamaraws)
- Appeton Most Improved Player of the Season: Arnold Van Opstal (De La Salle Green Archers)
- PSBank Maaasahan Player of the Year: Terrence Romeo (FEU Tamaraws)

== Women's tournament ==
=== Elimination round ===
==== Team standings ====
Pos	Team	W	L	PCT	GB	Qualification
1	NU Lady Bulldogs	12	2	.857 (Note: Head-to-head record: NU 1–1 La Salle (NU +1))	—	Twice-to-beat in the semifinals
2	De La Salle Lady Archers	12	2	.857	—	Twice-to-beat in the semifinals
3	UST Growling Tigresses	8	6	.571 (Note: Head-to-head record: UST 2–0 Adamson)	4	Twice-to-win in the semifinals
4	Adamson Lady Falcons	8	6	.571	4	Twice-to-win in the semifinals
5	FEU Lady Tamaraws (Note: FEU forfeited 5 wins after Vangie Soriano, who participated on those games, played in a ligang labas game while the season was ongoing.)	7	7	.500	5	
6	UP Lady Maroons	6	8	.429	6	
7	UE Lady Warriors	2	12	.143	10	
8	Ateneo Lady Eagles	1	13	.071	11	

Source: ABS-CBN Sports
Rules for classification: 1) winning percentage; 2) if tied for #2 or #4, one-game playoff; 3) head-to-head record; 4) head-to-head point differential; 5) overall point differential

==== Schedule ====
	Round 1							Round 2						
Team ╲ Game	1	2	3	4	5	6	7	8	9	10	11	12	13	14
Adamson	FEU school colors	UP school colors	La Salle school colors	UE school colors	NU school colors	UST school colors	Ateneo school colors	NU school colors	FEU school colors	UP school colors	UST school colors	UE school colors	La Salle school colors	Ateneo school colors
Ateneo	La Salle school colors	UE school colors	FEU school colors	NU school colors	UST school colors	UP school colors	Adamson school colors	UP school colors	UST school colors	La Salle school colors	NU school colors	FEU school colors	UE school colors	Adamson school colors
La Salle	Ateneo school colors	UST school colors	Adamson school colors	UP school colors	UE school colors	NU school colors	FEU school colors	FEU school colors	NU school colors	Ateneo school colors	UST school colors	UP school colors	Adamson school colors	UE school colors
FEU	Adamson school colors	NU school colors	Ateneo school colors	UST school colors	UP school colors	UE school colors	La Salle school colors	La Salle school colors	UST school colors	Adamson school colors	UP school colors	UE school colors	Ateneo school colors	NU school colors
NU	UP school colors	FEU school colors	UE school colors	Ateneo school colors	Adamson school colors	La Salle school colors	UST school colors	Adamson school colors	UP school colors	La Salle school colors	Ateneo school colors	UE school colors	UST school colors	FEU school colors
UE	UST school colors	Ateneo school colors	NU school colors	Adamson school colors	La Salle school colors	FEU school colors	UP school colors	UST school colors	UP school colors	FEU school colors	NU school colors	Adamson school colors	Ateneo school colors	La Salle school colors
UP	NU school colors	Adamson school colors	UST school colors	La Salle school colors	FEU school colors	Ateneo school colors	UE school colors	Ateneo school colors	NU school colors	UE school colors	FEU school colors	Adamson school colors	La Salle school colors	UST school colors
UST	UE school colors	La Salle school colors	UP school colors	FEU school colors	Ateneo school colors	Adamson school colors	NU school colors	UE school colors	FEU school colors	Ateneo school colors	La Salle school colors	Adamson school colors	NU school colors	UP school colors

= Win; = OT win; = Win by forfeit; = Loss; = OT loss; = Loss by forfeit

==== Results ====
Team	AdU	ADMU	DLSU	FEU	NU	UE	UP	UST
Adamson Lady Falcons		81–53	43–45*	48–54	66–76	66–51	72–53	80–81
Ateneo Lady Eagles	50–59		38–54	48–51	57–63	54–55	46–56	63–74
La Salle Lady Archers	52–54	74–44		49–70 (Note: Win by forfeit)	55–64	63–35	59–39	58–56
FEU Lady Tamaraws	50–45 (Note: Loss by forfeit)	52–42	67–62		57–50	74–53	68–31	52–51
NU Lady Bulldogs	65–58	55–46	69–77	66–63		62–41	60–51	81–69
UE Lady Warriors	57–82	50–65	58–82	57–67	56–79		55–67	45–67
UP Lady Maroons	46–52	71–63	64–71	48–54	61–68	46–37		51–49
UST Tigresses	70–64	63–60	45–72	61–58	60–79	72–51	84–62	

Legend: Blue = left column team win; Red = top row team win.
Matches with lighter background shading were decided after overtime.

=== Bracket ===
Semifinals (Top 2 twice-to-beat)
1	NU	71	66
4	Adamson	76	47
2	La Salle	81*
3	UST	74

Finals (Best-of-three playoff)
1	NU	48	67	61
2	La Salle	72	52	69

*Overtime

=== Semifinals ===
In the semifinals, the higher seed has the twice-to-beat advantage, where they only have to win once, while their opponents twice, to progress.

==== (1) NU vs. (4) Adamson ====
September 22
9:00 p.m.

NU Lady Bulldogs	71–76	Adamson Lady Falcons
Scoring by quarter: 19–14, 19–22, 17–14, 16–26

Smart Araneta Coliseum, Quezon City

September 25
12:00 n.n.

NU Lady Bulldogs	66–47	Adamson Lady Falcons
Scoring by quarter: 18–9, 12–11, 13–17, 23–10
NU wins series in two games

Mall of Asia Arena, Pasay

==== (2) La Salle vs. (3) UST ====
September 22
11:00 a.m.

De La Salle Lady Archers	81–74 (OT)	UST Growling Tigresses
Scoring by quarter: 12–21, 12–18, 24–12, 18–15, Overtime: 15–8
La Salle wins series in one game

Smart Araneta Coliseum, Quezon City

=== Finals ===
Studio 23

September 28
11:00 a.m.

NU Lady Bulldogs	48–72	De La Salle Lady Archers
Scoring by quarter: 14–15, 13–18, 14–17, 7–22

Mall of Asia Arena, Pasay

Studio 23

October 2
11:00 a.m.

NU Lady Bulldogs	67–52	De La Salle Lady Archers
Scoring by quarter: 18–17, 13–13, 18–9, 18–13

Smart Araneta Coliseum, Quezon City

Studio 23

October 5
11:00 a.m.

NU Lady Bulldogs	61–69	De La Salle Lady Archers
Scoring by quarter: 13–15, 16–15, 11–23, 21–16
La Salle wins series 2–1

Smart Araneta Coliseum, Quezon City

- Finals Most Valuable Player Trisha Piatos (De La Salle Lady Archers)

All finals games were aired by Studio 23 on a delayed basis on the same day the games were played.

=== Awards ===
UAAP Season 76 women's basketball champions
De La Salle Lady Archers
Fifth title

- Most Valuable Player: Camille Sambile (FEU Lady Tamaraws)
- Rookie of the Year: Love Joy Sto. Domingo (UE Lady Warriors)
- Mythical Five:
  - Lorelei Rivera (UST Growling Tigresses)
  - Afril Bernardino (NU Lady Bulldogs)
  - Aracelie Abaca (De La Salle Lady Archers)
  - Camille Sambile (FEU Lady Tamaraws)
  - Danica Jose (Ateneo Lady Eagles)

== Juniors' tournament ==
=== Elimination round ===
==== Team standings ====
Pos	Team	W	L	PCT	GB	Qualification
1	NUNS Bullpups	14	0	1.000	—	Thrice-to-beat in the Finals (Note: As NSNU won all of their elimination round games, the stepladder format will be used instead of the regular Final Four format.)
2	Ateneo Blue Eaglets	11	3	.786	3	Twice-to-beat in stepladder round 2
3	Zobel Junior Archers	9	5	.643	5	Proceed to stepladder round 1
4	FEU–D Baby Tamaraws	8	6	.571	6	Proceed to stepladder round 1
5	UE Junior Red Warriors	5	9	.357	9	
6	UST Tiger Cubs	4	10	.286 (Note: Head-to-head record: UST 1–1 UP (UST +4))	10	
7	UPIS Junior Fighting Maroons	4	10	.286	10	
8	Adamson Baby Falcons	1	13	.071	13	

Source: ABS-CBN Sports
Rules for classification: 1) winning percentage; 2) if tied for #2 or #4, one-game playoff; 3) head-to-head record; 4) head-to-head point differential; 5) overall point differential

==== Schedule ====
	Round 1							Round 2						
Team ╲ Game	1	2	3	4	5	6	7	8	9	10	11	12	13	14
AdU	La Salle school colors	UST school colors	UP school colors	NU school colors	FEU school colors	Ateneo school colors	UE school colors	UE school colors	UST school colors	Ateneo school colors	NU school colors	La Salle school colors	FEU school colors	UP school colors
ADMU	NU school colors	UE school colors	FEU school colors	La Salle school colors	UP school colors	Adamson school colors	UST school colors	FEU school colors	La Salle school colors	Adamson school colors	UP school colors	UST school colors	UE school colors	NU school colors
DLSZ	Adamson school colors	FEU school colors	UE school colors	UST school colors	Ateneo school colors	NU school colors	UP school colors	NU school colors	Ateneo school colors	UP school colors	UE school colors	Adamson school colors	UST school colors	FEU school colors
FEU	UST school colors	La Salle school colors	Ateneo school colors	UP school colors	Adamson school colors	UE school colors	NU school colors	Ateneo school colors	NU school colors	UE school colors	UST school colors	UP school colors	Adamson school colors	La Salle school colors
NU	Ateneo school colors	UP school colors	UST school colors	UE school colors	Adamson school colors	La Salle school colors	FEU school colors	La Salle school colors	FEU school colors	UST school colors	Adamson school colors	UE school colors	UP school colors	Ateneo school colors
UE	UP school colors	Ateneo school colors	La Salle school colors	NU school colors	UST school colors	FEU school colors	Adamson school colors	Adamson school colors	UP school colors	FEU school colors	La Salle school colors	NU school colors	Ateneo school colors	UST school colors
UP	UE school colors	NU school colors	Adamson school colors	FEU school colors	Ateneo school colors	UST school colors	La Salle school colors	UST school colors	UE school colors	La Salle school colors	Ateneo school colors	FEU school colors	NU school colors	Adamson school colors
UST	FEU school colors	Adamson school colors	NU school colors	La Salle school colors	UE school colors	UP school colors	Ateneo school colors	UP school colors	Adamson school colors	NU school colors	FEU school colors	Ateneo school colors	La Salle school colors	UE school colors

= Win; = OT win; = Loss; = OT loss

==== Results ====
Team	AdU	ADMU	DLSU	FEU	NU	UE	UP	UST
Adamson Baby Falcons		57–69	80–84*	43–63	43–67	52–58	87–89****	69–84
Ateneo Blue Eaglets	71–45		73–68	78–82	72–79	71–64	85–75	75–69
Zobel Junior Archers	65–47	54–64		61–59	58–77	79–45	68–63	84–72
FEU-FERN Baby Tamaraws	67–42	69–75	66–47		76–79	81–55	63–55	65–71
NU Bullpups	70–41	82–81*	85–48	63–40		76–55	93–65	81–56
UE Junior Warriors	57–70	49–68	47–60	38–66	60–70		87–81	62–55
UPIS Junior Maroons	60–57	69–73	50–61	55–51	58–83	46–48*		64–66
UST Tiger Cubs	69–62*	63–79	46–49	42–44	55–94	48–51	71–73	

Legend: Blue = left column team win; Red = top row team win.
Matches with lighter background shading were decided after overtime.

=== Bracket ===
Stepladder round 1 (Single-elimination)
3	DLSZ	55
4	FEU–FERN	65*

Stepladder round 2 (No. 2 twice-to-beat)
2	Ateneo	69
4	FEU–FERN	64

Finals (No. 1 thrice-to-beat)
1	NU	101*	81
2	Ateneo	93	74

*Overtime

=== Stepladder semifinals ===
==== (3) DLSZ vs. (4) FEU-FERN ====
This was single-elimination.

September 17

Zobel Junior Archers	55–65	FEU–FERN Baby Tamaraws
Scoring by quarter: 16–16, 6–16, 15–19, 18–14
FEU–FERN advances to the stepladder semifinals round 2

Blue Eagle Gym, Quezon City

==== (2) Ateneo vs. (4) FEU-FERN ====
In the semifinals, Ateneo has the twice-to-beat advantage, where they only have to win once, while their opponents twice, to progress.

September 21
12:00 n.n.

Ateneo Blue Eaglets	69–64	FEU–D Baby Tamaraws
Scoring by quarter: 9–17, 23–15, 15–14, 22–18
Ateneo wins series in one game

Mall of Asia Arena, Pasay

=== Finals ===
NU has to win two times, while their opponent has to win three times, to win the championship.

October 7
9:00 a.m.

NUNS Bullpups	101–93 (OT)	Ateneo Blue Eaglets
Scoring by quarter: 21–25, 16–20, 20–21, 29–20, Overtime: 15–7

Filoil Flying V Arena, San Juan

October 9
1:00 p.m.

NUNS Bullpups	81–74	Ateneo Blue Eaglets
Scoring by quarter: 27–20, 13–18, 23–20, 18–16
NU wins series in two games

Filoil Flying V Arena, San Juan

- Finals Most Valuable Player: Hubert Cani (NUNS Bullpups)

Both finals games were aired by Studio 23 on a delayed basis on October 10.

=== Awards ===
UAAP Season 76 juniors' basketball champions
NUNS Bullpups
Fifth title

- Most Valuable Player: Thirdy Ravena (Ateneo Blue Eaglets)
- Rookie of the Year: Aaron Reyes (UST Tiger Cubs)
- Mythical Five:
  - Hubert Cani (NUNS Bullpups)
  - Thirdy Ravena (Ateneo Blue Eaglets)
  - Mark Dyke (NUNS Bullpups)
  - John Paul Cauilan (NUNS Bullpups)
  - Reinier Quinga (Adamson Baby Falcons)

== Overall championship points ==
- Pts.: Position
15	Champion
12	2nd
10	3rd
8	4th
6	5th
4	6th
2	7th
1	8th
—	Did not join
WD	Withdrew

In case of ties, the team with the higher position in any tournament is ranked higher; if both are still tied, they are listed by alphabetical order.

=== Seniors' division ===
Team	Men	Women	Total
De La Salle Green Archers	15	15	30
UST Growling Tigers	12	10	22
NU Bulldogs	8	12	20
FEU Tamaraws	10	6	16
Adamson Soaring Falcons	2	8	10
Ateneo Blue Eagles	6	1	7
UE Red Warriors	4	2	6
UP Fighting Maroons	1	4	5

=== Juniors' division ===
Team	Total
NUNS Bullpups	15
Ateneo Blue Eaglets	12
FEU–D Baby Tamaraws	10
Zobel Junior Archers	8
UE Junior Red Warriors	6
UST Tiger Cubs	4
UPIS Junior Fighting Maroons	2
Adamson Baby Falcons	1

== See also ==
- NCAA Season 89 basketball tournaments

Preceded by Season 75 (2012)	UAAP basketball seasons Season 76 (2013)	Succeeded by Season 77 (2014)
