= JR =

JR, J. R. or Jr. may refer to:

== Arts and entertainment ==
- J R, a 1975 novel by William Gaddis
- J. R. Ewing, a Dallas television character
- JR Chandler, an All My Children television character
- JR, a 2001 punk album by Jim Bob
- "Jr.", a 1992 song by Codeine on the album Barely Real
- Bowser Jr., a Mario franchise character

== Media ==
- Disney Jr., an American television channel
- Jornal da Record, a Brazilian news program
- Nick Jr., preschool television on Nickelodeon
- RTEjr, an Irish children's television channel

== People ==
=== In arts and entertainment ===
- JR (artist) (born 1983), French photographer and street artist
- Jane Remover (born 2003), American musician
- J.R. (musician) (born 1979), American Christian singer and producer
- JR (rapper) (born 1987), South African rapper and entrepreneur
- J. R. Rotem (born 1975), American producer and songwriter
- Jayam Ravi (born 1980), Indian actor
- Park Jin-young (formerly Jr.), South Korean singer of Got7 and JJ Project
- Kim Jong-hyeon (born 1995; stage name: JR), South Korean singer of NU'EST
- J. R. Martinez (born 1983), American actor and soldier
- Jim Ross (born 1952), American wrestling commentator
- John Ruskin (1819–1900), English writer and art critic
- Juufuutei Raden, Japanese VTuber

=== In sport ===
- J. R. Bremer (born 1980), American-Bosnian basketball player
- J. R. Pinnock (born 1983), Panamanian basketball player
- J. R. Redmond (born 1977), American football player
- J. R. Singleton (born 2002), American football player
- J. R. Smith (born 1985), American basketball player
- Jeremy Roenick (born 1970), American ice hockey player

=== Others ===
- J. R. Jayewardene (1906–1996), president of Sri Lanka from 1978 to 1989
- Jose Rizal (1861–1896), Filipino nationalist, author and polymath and a national hero

== Transport ==
- Japan Railways Group
- Jember railway station, Indonesia
- Aero California, a Mexican airline (IATA code JR, 1960-2008)
- Joy Air, a Chinese airline (IATA code JR since 2008)

== Other uses ==
- Junior (suffix) (Jr.), a generational title
- John Radcliffe Hospital, Oxford, England
- Judicial review, in law

== See also ==
- Junior (disambiguation)
- JRJR (disambiguation)
