= 2013 UST Growling Tigers basketball team =

Philippines college basketball season

2013 UST Growling Tigers men's basketball

UAAP Season 76 runner-up

Record
- Elims rank: #4
- Final rank: #2
- 2013 record: 11–8 (8–6 elims)
- Head coach: Pido Jarencio (8th season)
- Assistant coaches: Estong Ballesteros; Senen Dueñas
- Captain: Jeric Teng (5th season)

The 2013 UST Growling Tigers men's basketball team represented University of Santo Tomas in the 76th season of the University Athletic Association of the Philippines. The men's basketball tournament for the school year 2013-2014 began on June 29, 2013 and the host school for the season was Adamson University.

The Tigers, who at one point in the season were at sixth place in the standings with a 4-5 record finished fourth at the end of the double round-robin eliminations with eight wins against six losses. They made it to the Finals for the second straight year after defeating the No. 1-ranked NU Bulldogs in a repeat of their Final Four match last year while having a twice-to-win disadvantage. UST made history by becoming the first fourth-seeded team in the UAAP to reach the Finals.

They lost to La Salle in the best-of-three championship series. The Tigers who were facing the Green Archers in the Finals for the first time since 1999, had snapped La Salle's nine-game winning streak in Game One by a single point at 73-72. The Archers went on to win the next two games for the title with Game Three going into overtime.

Cameroonian center Karim Abdul was selected to the Mythical team for the second straight year.

== Roster ==
UST Growling Tigers roster
Players
Coaches

Pos.	No.	Nat.	Name	Height	Year	High School
SF	5	(Philippines)	Kim Kaizen Lo	6'1" (1.85m)	4th	St. Jude Catholic School
SG	6	(Philippines)	Eduardo Daquioag, Jr.	6'1" (1.85m)	3rd	RTU Laboratory High School
PF	7	(Philippines)	Kevin Ferrer	6'4" (1.93m)	3rd	University of Santo Tomas
PG	8	(Philippines)	Robin Allan Tan	5'7" (1.7m)	3rd	Xavier School
SG	9	(Philippines)	Clark Daniel Oliver Bautista	5'9" (1.75m)	5th	Benedictine International School
SF	10	(Philippines)	Aljon Mariano	6'3" (1.91m)	4th	San Beda College–Rizal
PG	11	(Philippines)	Edcor Marata (injured)	5'10" (1.78m)	2nd	University of the Visayas
PF	12	(Philippines)	Jon Cornelius Macasaet (injured)	6'3" (1.91m)	1st	San Sebastian College-Recoletos
C	13	(Philippines)	Paulo Lorenzo Pe	6'4" (1.93m)	4th	Ateneo de Manila
SF	14	(Philippines)	Brian James So (injured)	6'2" (1.88m)	1st	Colegio de San Juan de Letran
C	15	(Philippines)	Roberto Hainga	6'7" (2.01m)	4th	Iloilo Central Commercial High School
SG	16	(Philippines)	Jeric Allen Teng (C)	6'2" (1.88m)	5th	Xavier School
C	17	(Philippines)	Jeepy Faundo	6'6" (1.98m)	1st	José Rizal University
PG	18	(Canada)	Sheak Jamil Sheriff, Jr.	5'9" (1.75m)	2nd	Loyola Catholic Secondary School
SF	19	(Philippines)	Kent Jefferson Lao	6'4" (1.93m)	2nd	Saint Stephen's High School
C	20	(Cameroon)	Karim Abdul	6'6" (1.98m)	3rd	Sta. Clara International Academy

Head coach

- (Philippines) Alfredo Jarencio

Assistant coach(es)

- Senen Dueñas
- Ernesto Ballesteros
- Segundo dela Cruz, III
- Alvin Grey
- Christopher Cantonjos
- Ma. Genevieve Francisco
- Rodil Sablan

Strength & conditioning coach(es)

- Emmanuel Calipes
- Yi Ming Liu
- Kris Anthony Agarao

Team manager

- Clarence Aytona

Legend

- (C) Team captain
- Injured

- Roster

=== Depth chart ===
Pos.	Starting 5	Bench 1	Bench 2
C	Abdul	Hainga	Faundo
PF	Ferrer	Pe	Lao
SF	Mariano	Lo
SG	Teng	Daquioag	So
PG	Bautista	Sheriff	Tan

== Roster changes ==
=== Subtractions ===
Pos.	No.	Nat.	Player	Height	Year	High school	Notes
PG	7	(Philippines)	Jeric Marco Fortuna	5' 7"	5th	De La Salle Santiago Zobel School	Graduated
PF	8	(Philippines)	Carmelo Afuang	6' 4"	5th	San Beda College–Rizal	Graduated
PG	12	(Philippines)	Janrey Garrido	5' 6"	2nd	Hope Christian High School	Out on injury
SG	17	(Philippines)	Christian Errol Villar	6' 0"	2nd	Hope Christian High School	Transferred to Enderun Colleges
SG	18	(Philippines)	Louie Philippe Vigil	6' 3"	3rd	José Rizal University	Academic deficiencies
C	19	(Philippines)	Kenneth Mamaril	6' 5"	3rd	San Sebastian College-Recoletos	Relegated to Team B

=== Additions ===
Pos.	No.	Nat.	Player	Height	Year	High school	Notes
PG	11	(Philippines)	Edcor Marata	5' 10"	2nd	University of the Visayas	Returning from Season 73
PF	12	(Philippines)	Jon Cornelius Macasaet	6' 3"	1st	San Sebastian College-Recoletos	Rookie
SF	14	(Philippines)	Brian James So	6' 2"	1st	Colegio de San Juan de Letran	Rookie
C	17	(Philippines)	Jeepy Faundo	6' 6"	1st	José Rizal University	Rookie
PG	18	(Canada)	Sheak Jamil Sheriff, Jr.	5' 9"	2nd	Loyola Catholic Secondary School	Returning from Season 74
SF	19	(Philippines)	Kent Jefferson Lao	6' 4"	2nd	Saint Stephen's High School	Returning from Season 74

=== Recruiting class ===
Name	Pos.	Height	High school	Hometown	Commit date
Joco Macasaet	PF	6' 3"	San Sebastian College-Recoletos	Batangas City	24 Apr 2013
Joco Macasaet	2013 National Basketball Training Center Top 30 player				
Sources: 12

== Injuries ==
The Growling Tigers' season was plagued with injuries. Team captain Jeric Teng was leading in statistical points early in the tournament before suffering a slight labral tear on his shoulder. The injury which required the aid of crutches sidelined him for five games. Teng returned in the second round but got injured again after playing just one game when he sustained a pulled hamstring. He was fully recovered in time for the playoffs and was able to play in all of the team's Final Four and championship games.

Aljon Mariano had played the whole season while nursing an ankle injury while Kevin Ferrer suffered a fractured cheek bone from an elbow hit during a game against the UE Red Warriors. The injury required the use of a protective mask during games and corrective eye glasses outside games for a period of two months.

Returning point guard Pipoy Marata and rookie Joco Macasaet both suffered ACL injuries, while Brian So who was also a rookie had a lateral collateral ligament stress. All three players did not finish the season.

== Schedule and results ==
=== Preseason tournaments ===
The Filoil Flying V Preseason Premier Cup games were aired on Studio 23.

Preseason game log

2013 Filoil Flying V Preseason Hanes Cup: 6–5
Game	Date • Time	Opponent	Result	Record	High points	High rebounds	High assists	Location
1	Apr 13 • 4:00 pm	De La Salle Green Archers	L 67–73	0–1	Teng (31)	Abdul (6)		Filoil Flying V Arena; San Juan
2	Apr 20 • 4:00 pm	Ateneo Blue Eagles	W 63–57	1–1	Mariano (19)	Abdul (11)		Filoil Flying V Arena; San Juan
3	May 3 • 4:15 pm	SWU Cobras	L 63–64	1–2	Tied (12)			Filoil Flying V Arena; San Juan
4	May 10 • 12:00 pm	San Sebastian Stags	W 83–79	2–2	Mariano (23)			Filoil Flying V Arena; San Juan
5	May 11 • 12:00 pm	Letran Knights	W 78–77	3–2	Mariano (18)			Filoil Flying V Arena; San Juan
6	May 18 • 2:00 pm	UE Red Warriors	L 68–85	3–3	Mariano (15)			Filoil Flying V Arena; San Juan
7	May 24 • 12:45 pm	Lyceum Pirates	W 93–86^{OT}	4–3	Mariano (31)			Filoil Flying V Arena; San Juan
8	May 31 • 2:30 pm	EAC Generals	W 76–75	5–3	Teng (27)			Filoil Flying V Arena; San Juan
9	Jun 3 • 4:00 pm	Arellano Chiefs; Quarterfinal round	W 83–73	6–3	Teng (23)			Filoil Flying V Arena; San Juan
10	Jun 7 • 2:00 pm	UE Red Warriors; Semifinal round	L 75–77	6–4	Ferrer (19)			Filoil Flying V Arena; San Juan
11	Jun 12 • 2:00 pm	San Beda Red Lions; Battle for 3rd place	L 70–74	6–5	Teng (27)			Filoil Flying V Arena; San Juan

(#) Tournament seedings in parentheses.
All times are in UTC+08:00.

=== UAAP games ===
Elimination games were played in a double round-robin format. All games were aired on Studio 23 and Balls. The second and third games of the Finals series were aired on ABS-CBN and Balls.

UAAP Season 76 game log

Elimination round: 8–6
Game	Date • Time	Opponent	Result	Record	High points	High rebounds	High assists	Location
1	Jun 29 • 4:00 pm	De La Salle Green Archers	W 63–58^{OT}	1–0	Teng (23)	Abdul (10)	Ferrer (4)	Mall of Asia Arena; Pasay
2	Jul 6 • 2:00 pm	Adamson Soaring Falcons	W 67–62	2–0	Ferrer (17)	Mariano (7)	Mariano (3)	Smart Araneta Coliseum; Quezon City
3	Jul 10 • 4:00 pm	NU Bulldogs	L 67–71	2–1	Ferrer (20)	Abdul (12)	Teng (3)	Smart Araneta Coliseum; Quezon City
4	Jul 13 • 2:00 pm	UE Red Warriors	W 88–77	3–1	Abdul (25)	Abdul (13)	Daquioag (6)	Mall of Asia Arena; Pasay
5	Jul 21 • 4:00 pm	FEU Tamaraws	L 67–77	3–2	Abdul (21)	Mariano (12)	Mariano (4)	Mall of Asia Arena; Pasay
6	Jul 24 • 4:00 pm	UP Fighting Maroons	W 79–69	4–2	Mariano (18)	Ferrer (10)	Daquioag (3)	Smart Araneta Coliseum; Quezon City
7	Jul 27 • 4:00 pm	Ateneo Blue Eagles; End of R1 of eliminations	L 57–61	4–3	Mariano (16)	Abdul (15)	Tied (2)	Smart Araneta Coliseum; Quezon City
8	Aug 15 • 4:00 pm	UE Red Warriors	L 67–68	4–4	Abdul (23)	Abdul (20)	Tied (3)	Smart Araneta Coliseum; Quezon City
	Aug 21 • 4:00 pm	Ateneo Blue Eagles	Postponed due to Typhoon Maring					Mall of Asia Arena; Pasay
9	Aug 24 • 4:00 pm	NU Bulldogs	L 61–75	4–5	Abdul (18)	Tied (12)	Ferrer (5)	Smart Araneta Coliseum; Quezon City
10	Aug 28 • 2:00 pm	Adamson Soaring Falcons	W 80–67	5–5	Abdul (19)	Abdul (12)	Mariano (5)	Smart Araneta Coliseum; Quezon City
11	Sep 1 • 12:00 pm	FEU Tamaraws	W 79–78^{2OT}	6–5	Abdul (21)	Ferrer (13)	Mariano (8)	Smart Araneta Coliseum; Quezon City
12	Sep 7 • 2:00 pm	UP Fighting Maroons	W 63–39	7–5	Mariano (18)	Abdul (21)	Bautista (4)	Mall of Asia Arena; Pasay
13	Sep 14 • 4:00 pm	De La Salle Green Archers	L 64–69	7–6	Abdul (18)	Tied (12)	Teng (4)	Mall of Asia Arena; Pasay
14	Sep 18 • 2:00 pm	Ateneo Blue Eagles; End of R2 of eliminations	W 82–74	8–6	Abdul (25)	Tied (9)	Sheriff (5)	Smart Araneta Coliseum; Quezon City

Final Four: 2–0
Game	Date • Time	Seed	Opponent	Result	Series	High points	High rebounds	High assists	Location
1	Sep 22 • 4:00 pm	(#4)	(#1) NU Bulldogs	W 71–62	1–0 (9–6)	Ferrer (14)	Tied (7)	Tied (2)	Smart Araneta Coliseum; Quezon City
2	Sep 28 • 4:00 pm	(#4)	(#1) NU Bulldogs	W 76–69	2–0 (10–6)	Teng (19)	Mariano (10)	Sheriff (5)	Smart Araneta Coliseum; Quezon City

Finals: 1–2
Game	Date • Time	Seed	Opponent	Result	Series	High points	High rebounds	High assists	Location
1	Oct 2 • 4:00 pm	(#4)	(#2) De La Salle Green Archers	W 73–72	1–0 (11–6)	Ferrer (20)	Abdul (12)	Tied (3)	Mall of Asia Arena; Pasay
2	Oct 5 • 4:00 pm	(#4)	(#2) De La Salle Green Archers	L 70–77	1–1 (11–7)	Teng (28)	Abdul (9)	Tied (2)	Smart Araneta Coliseum; Quezon City
3	Oct 12 • 4:00 pm	(#4)	(#2) De La Salle Green Archers	L 69–71^{OT}	1–2 (11–8)	Abdul (26)	Abdul (8)	Bautista (6)	Mall of Asia Arena; Pasay

(#) Tournament seedings in parentheses.
All times are in UTC+08:00.
Source: HumbleBola

=== Postseason tournament ===
Postseason game log

2013 Philippine Collegiate Championship: 6–2
Game	Date • Time	Opponent	Result	Record	High points	High rebounds	High assists	Location
1	Dec 2 • 4:00 pm	Letran Knights; Luzon-NCR Regional semifinals	W 77–60	1–0	Bautista (23)			Ynares Sports Arena; Pasig
2	Dec 3 • 4:00 pm	FEU Tamaraws; Luzon-NCR Regional finals	L 68–71	1–1	Abdul (20)			Ynares Sports Arena; Pasig

(#) Tournament seedings in parentheses.
All times are in UTC+08:00.

== UAAP statistics ==
=== Eliminations ===
Player	GP	GS	MPG	FGM	FGA	FG%	3PM	3PA	3P%	FTM	FTA	FT%	RPG	APG	SPG	BPG	TOV	PPG
Karim Abdul	14	14	33.0	82	190	43.2	2	6	33.3	63	97	64.9	12.1	1.4	0.9	2.0	3.2	16.4
Aljon Mariano	14	8	29.7	64	149	43.0	6	17	35.3	45	67	67.2	7.1	2.4	0.5	0.2	2.6	12.8
Jeric Teng	7	7	27.4	30	90	33.3	4	26	15.4	19	24	79.2	4.3	1.7	0.9	0.0	1.6	11.9
Kevin Ferrer	14	10	30.4	58	171	33.9	9	71	12.7	42	61	68.9	8.1	2.1	0.7	1.0	1.9	11.9
Ed Daquioag	14	8	24.4	45	104	43.3	9	37	24.3	24	39	61.5	4.5	2.5	0.6	0.4	2.3	8.8
Tata Bautista	14	8	28.5	38	130	29.2	23	79	29.1	15	19	78.9	3.8	1.6	0.4	0.0	1.7	8.1
Kim Lo	14	6	17.6	17	55	30.9	2	13	15.4	10	15	66.7	2.9	1.1	0.8	0.2	0.9	3.3
Jon Sheriff	8	1	12.5	5	16	31.3	0	0	0.0	6	10	60.0	2.8	1.5	0.3	0.0	0.1	2.0
Brian So	6	2	5.5	2	8	25.0	0	2	0.0	3	4	75.0	0.8	0.0	0.0	0.0	0.3	1.2
Paolo Pe	14	5	11.9	4	19	21.1	0	0	0.0	3	8	37.5	2.9	0.3	0.1	0.3	0.6	0.8
Robert Hainga	8	1	4.4	3	7	42.9	0	0	0.0	0	1	0.0	0.5	0.1	0.0	0.0	0.0	0.8
Jeepy Faundo	4	0	2.0	0	0	0.0	0	0	0.0	2	2	100.0	0.0	0.0	0.0	0.0	0.0	0.5
Kent Lao	6	0	3.8	0	4	0.0	0	0	0.0	1	2	50.0	0.7	0.0	0.0	0.2	0.0	0.2
Joco Macasaet	1	0	9.0	0	0	0.0	0	0	0.0	0	0	0.0	1.0	1.0	0.0	1.0	1.0	0.0
Pipoy Marata	1	0	2.0	0	1	0.0	0	0	0.0	0	0	0.0	1.0	0.0	0.0	0.0	0.0	0.0
Robin Tan	4	0	3.8	0	0	0.0	0	0	0.0	0	0	0.0	0.0	0.0	0.0	0.0	0.0	0.0
Total	14		41.1	348	944	36.9	55	251	21.9	233	349	66.8	47.8	13.2	4.7	4.2	14.9	70.3
Opponents	14		41.1	358	1,011	35.4	89	369	24.8	140	237	59.1	46.9	14.9	4.1	3.2	15.0	67.5

=== Playoffs ===
Player	GP	GS	MPG	FGM	FGA	FG%	3PM	3PA	3P%	FTM	FTA	FT%	RPG	APG	SPG	BPG	TOV	PPG
Jeric Teng	5	5	32.0	35	84	41.7	10	25	40.0	16	21	76.2	5.2	2.2	0.2	0.0	1.8	19.2
Karim Abdul	5	5	31.2	25	55	45.5	0	3	0.0	21	22	95.5	8.4	0.2	1.0	2.0	2.4	14.2
Kevin Ferrer	5	5	30.6	17	48	35.4	13	32	40.6	18	25	72.0	5.6	1.2	1.0	0.4	1.8	13.0
Aljon Mariano	5	4	34.0	12	51	23.5	0	7	0.0	14	22	63.6	8.0	1.6	0.6	0.2	3.2	7.6
Tata Bautista	5	0	20.2	12	38	31.6	5	24	20.8	4	6	66.7	2.0	2.0	0.4	0.0	2.0	6.6
Jon Sheriff	5	5	22.6	10	18	55.6	0	0	0.0	6	10	60.0	4.0	2.4	0.6	0.0	1.0	5.2
Ed Daquioag	4	0	12.8	4	14	28.6	0	5	0.0	1	1	100.0	1.0	1.3	0.0	0.3	1.3	2.3
Kent Lao	4	0	8.8	1	6	16.7	0	0	0.0	5	6	83.3	3.0	0.3	0.5	0.0	0.0	1.8
Paolo Pe	5	1	11.4	3	7	42.9	0	0	0.0	2	4	50.0	3.8	0.0	0.0	0.2	0.6	1.6
Kim Lo	4	0	7.0	1	4	25.0	0	1	0.0	4	4	100.0	2.0	0.0	0.3	0.0	1.3	1.5
Robert Hainga	1	0	1.0	0	0	0.0	0	0	0.0	0	0	0.0	0.0	0.0	0.0	0.0	0.0	0.0
Total	5		41.0	120	325	36.9	28	97	28.9	91	121	75.2	44.4	10.8	4.4	3.0	15.6	71.8
Opponents	5		41.0	125	343	36.4	25	98	25.5	76	127	59.8	47.0	12.4	4.4	4.4	14.8	70.2

Legend
GP	Games played	GS	Games started	MPG	Minutes per game
FGM	Field-goal made	FGA	Field-goal attempts	FG%	Field-goal percentage
3PM	3-point field-goal made	3PA	3-point field-goal attempts	3P%	3-point field-goal percentage
FTM	Free-throw made	FTA	Free-throw attempts	FT%	Free-throw percentage
RPG	Rebounds per game	APG	Assists per game	SPG	Steals per game
BPG	Blocks per game	TOV	Turnovers per game	PPG	Points per game

Source: HumbleBola

== Awards ==
Name	Award	Date	Ref.
Team	UAAP runners-up	12 Oct 2013	
Team	2013 Millennium Basketball League champions	May 2013	
Ed Daquioag	2013 Millennium Basketball League MVP	May 2013	
Aljon Mariano	Filoil Flying V Best Five of the Week	6–11 May 2013	
Karim Abdul	UAAP Mythical team	5 Oct 2013	

== Players drafted into the PBA ==
Jeric Teng was picked 12th overall by the Yeng Guiao-led Rain or Shine Elasto Painters team in the second round of the 2013 PBA draft on November 3, 2013. Tata Bautista applied for the rookie draft in 2014 and was selected 34th overall by the Blackwater Elite on August 24, 2014, while Robert Hainga did the same in 2015 and ended up with the Mahindra Enforcer team as the 49th overall pick on August 23, 2015.

Year	Round	Pick	Overall	Player	PBA team
2013	2	2	12	Jeric Teng	Rain or Shine Elasto Painters
2014	3	10	34	Clark Bautista	Blackwater Elite
2015	6	2	49	Robert Hainga	Mahindra Enforcer
