= JRJR =

JRJR, JR JR or Jr. Jr. may refer to:

- John Romita Jr. (born 1956), U.S. comic book artist nicknamed "JRJR"
- JR JR, U.S. indie-pop band formerly named "Dale Earnhardt Jr. Jr."
- JR Cigars (stock ticker: JRJR) U.S. cigar wholesaler and retailer

== Postnominal Jr. Jr. ==
- Hendrik Toompere Jr. Jr. (born 1986; Hendrik Toompere III) Estonian actor
- Frank Jr. Jr. (fictional character) from the NBC Friends-verse

== See also ==
- The Third (disambiguation), including the junior of a Jr.
- JR (disambiguation)
