= Junior =

Junior or Juniors may refer to:

== Aircraft ==
- Ekolot JK-05L Junior, a Polish ultralight aircraft
- PZL-112 Junior, a Polish training aircraft
- SZD-51 Junior, a Polish-made training and club glider

== Arts and entertainment ==
=== Characters ===
- Bowser Jr., a major antagonist of the Mario franchise also known simply as "Junior" or "Jr."
- Junior, the main protagonist in Storks
- Junior Soprano, the present-day patriarch on the TV show The Sopranos
- Junior, son of the Gorgs in the Fraggle Rock television series
- Junior, title character of the film Problem Child
- Jr. (Xenosaga), short for Gaignun Kukai Jr., a character in the Xenosaga series
- Junior Asparagus, in the children's show VeggieTales
- Junior, the English name of the main character "Ñoño" from the animated television series El Chavo Animado.
- Junior, a character from SpongeBob SquarePants
- Junior, Mr. Conductor's cousin in the film Thomas and the Magic Railroad
- Junior, the son of R&AW agent Tiger in the Indian YRF Spy Universe

=== Films ===
- Junior (1994 film), an American film starring Arnold Schwarzenegger
- Juniors (film), a 2003 Telugu film
- Junior (2008 film), a documentary about Quebec junior league ice hockey
- Junior (2025 film), a 2025 Telugu film

=== Music ===
- Junior (Junior Mance album), 1959
- Junior (Röyksopp album), 2009
- Junior (Kaki King album), 2010
- Junior (LaFontaines album), 2019

=== Other ===
- Junior (novel), by Macaulay Culkin
- Junior (Albanian TV channel), an Albanian children's television channel
- Junior (German TV channel), a defunct German children's television channel
- Junior TV, a defunct Italian television channel
- Bénin TV Junior, a Beninese television channel

== Education ==
- Junior (education year), the third year of high school or college in the United States
- Junior school, a stage of education in some countries

== Law ==
- Junior barrister, barrister in England and Wales who is not a KC

== People ==
- Junior (suffix), generational title
- Junior (name), a list of people with the given name, nickname or surname

== Sport ==
- Junior athletics, age-based athletic training and completion category
- Instances of junior athletic competition:
  - Junior football (disambiguation)
  - Atlético Junior, Colombian football team
  - Argentinos Juniors, Argentine centennial sports club
  - Junior ice hockey
- Junior, participant in competitive dog-exhibition discipline of Junior showmanship

== Vehicles ==
- Alfa Romeo Junior, a sports car produced in 1965–1976
- Alfa Romeo Junior (2024), an SUV produced since 2024
- DKW Junior, a small front wheel drive saloon produced in 1959–1965
- Nissan Junior, a pickup sold in Asia and Iran

== Other uses ==
- Junior Lake (Vancouver Island), a lake in British Columbia, Canada
- Junior (chess), a computer program
- Juniors, a type of US standard women's clothing size
- Junior, West Virginia, a town in Barbour County, West Virginia

== See also ==
- Junior's (disambiguation)
- JR (disambiguation)
