= Senior football =

The term senior football may refer to the following:

- Gaelic football played at senior national level, such as the All-Ireland Senior Football Championship
- Gaelic football played at senior local level, such as the Donegal Senior Football Championship

== See also ==
- Junior football (disambiguation)
