= UAAP Season 76 =

2013–14 athletic year of the University Athletic Association of the Philippines

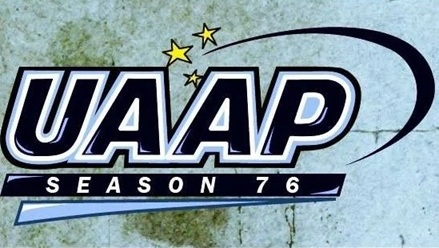
- "Greatness Never Ends"
- Host school: Adamson University

Overall
- Seniors: De La Salle University
- Juniors: University of the East

Seniors' champions
| Sport | | Men | Women |
| Basketball | | La Salle | La Salle |
| Volleyball | | NU | Ateneo |
| Beach volleyball | | NU | Adamson |
| Football | | FEU | FEU |
| Baseball | | Ateneo | N/A |
| Softball | | N/A | Adamson |
| Fencing | | UE | UE |
| Swimming | | UP | UP |
| Badminton | | Ateneo | Ateneo |
| Chess | | FEU | La Salle |
| Judo | | Ateneo | La Salle |
| Table tennis | | La Salle | UP |
| Tennis | | NU | NU |
| Track and field | | FEU | FEU |
| Taekwondo | | La Salle | UST |
- Poomsae: UST (Coed)
- Cheerdance: NU (Ex - Coed)

Juniors' champions
| Sport | | Boys | Girls |
| Basketball | | NU | N/A |
| Volleyball | | UE | UST |
| Beach volleyball | | FEU | |
| Football | | FEU | |
| Baseball | | UE | UE |
| Softball | | Ateneo | UE |
| Fencing | | NU | |
| Swimming | | Ateneo | |
| Badminton | | UE | |
| Chess | | UE | |
| Judo | | UE | |
- (NT) = No tournament; (DS) = Demonstration Sport; (Ex) = Exhibition;

UAAP Season 76 is the 2013–2014 athletic year of the University Athletic Association of the Philippines (UAAP). It was hosted by Adamson University with Fr. Maximino D. Rendon, C.M. as president. There were eight universities that competed in fifteen sports with poomsae, a form in the sport of taekwondo now recognized as a regular sport and included in the general championship tally.

Some of the sporting events were aired live or on a delayed telecast by ABS-CBN Channel 2 and Studio 23. All the men's basketball games and the women's volleyball games were aired live by ABS-CBN Sports, the former for the fourteenth consecutive year and the latter since Season 69. Starting this season, ABS-CBN Sports will air on Friday afternoons: one men's volleyball game (1-3 pm, on a delayed basis) and one live men's football game (3-5 pm). On January 18, 2014, the UAAP telecast transferred to ABS-CBN Sports+Action starting with women's volleyball after Studio 23 ceased its broadcast on January 17, 2014.

== Opening ceremony ==
Season 76 opened on Saturday, June 29, 2013 at 12:30 P.M. at the Mall of Asia Arena with an elaborate and colorful opening ceremony patterned after the hit book "The Hunger Games". Its theme is "Greatness never ends".

Dancers representing the eight universities dressed up according to their school's identity, but taking a page from the book from which the opening ceremony was themed. The schools’ dancers wore hats, capes matching their university colors and giving off a tribal look, as they came out like the characters from the Districts. The others were dressed in over-the-top outfits, looking like the people from the Capitol — as in the movie. Adamson, this year's host of the UAAP, had the most elaborate introduction in the opening as they showcased huge birds with feathers of white and blue.

The opening ceremony was followed by two men's basketball games, University of the East versus Far Eastern University and De La Salle University against University of Santo Tomas.

The June start, compared to the usual July opening of past seasons, was due to the decision of the UAAP to suspend its basketball games while the 2013 FIBA Asia Championship was running from August 1–11, 2013. This gave way to the country's hosting of the continental caging as requested by the Samahang Basketbol ng Pilipinas.

== Sports calendar ==
=== 1st semester sports (June–October) ===
- June
  - Basketball
- August
  - Beach volleyball
  - Badminton
- September
  - Judo
  - Taekwondo
  - Poomsae
  - Table Tennis
  - Swimming
  - Cheerdance

=== 2nd semester sports (November–March) ===
- November
  - Football
- December
  - Volleyball
  - Softball
  - Track and Field
  - Fencing
- January
  - Baseball
  - Tennis
  - Chess

== Basketball ==
The UAAP Season 76 basketball tournament began on June 29, 2013 at the Mall of Asia Arena. The tournament host was Adamson University and tournament commissioner was Joaquin "Chito" Loyzaga.

=== Seniors division ===
==== Men's tournament ====
===== Elimination round =====
====== Team standings ======
| Pos | Team | W | L | PCT | GB | Qualification |
|---|---|---|---|---|---|---|
| 1 | NU Bulldogs | 10 | 4 | .714 (Note: Head-to-head record: NU 2–2, La Salle 2–2, FEU 2–2 (NU +2, La Salle 0, FEU –2); second-seed playoff: La Salle 74–69 FEU) | — | Twice-to-beat in the semifinals |
| 2 | De La Salle Green Archers | 10 | 4 | .714 | — | Twice-to-beat in the semifinals |
| 3 | FEU Tamaraws | 10 | 4 | .714 | — | Twice-to-win in the semifinals |
| 4 | UST Growling Tigers | 8 | 6 | .571 | 2 | Twice-to-win in the semifinals |
| 5 | Ateneo Blue Eagles | 7 | 7 | .500 (Note: Head-to-head record: Ateneo 1–1 UE (Ateneo +1)) | 3 | |
| 6 | UE Red Warriors | 7 | 7 | .500 | 3 | |
| 7 | Adamson Soaring Falcons (H) | 4 | 10 | .286 | 6 | |
| 8 | UP Fighting Maroons | 0 | 14 | .000 | 10 | |

Source: ABS-CBN Sports
Rules for classification: 1) winning percentage; 2) if tied for #2 or #4, one-game playoff; 3) head-to-head record; 4) head-to-head point differential; 5) overall point differential
(H) Hosts

===== Playoffs =====
Semifinals (Top 2 twice-to-beat)
1 | NU | 62 | 69
4 | UST | 71 | 76
2 | La Salle | 71
3 | FEU | 68

Finals (Best-of-three playoff)
4 | UST | 73 | 70 | 69
2 | La Salle | 72 | 77 | 71*

*Overtime

===== Awards =====
- Most Valuable Player: Terrence Romeo (FEU Tamaraws)
- Rookie of the Year: Kyles Jefferson Lao (UP Fighting Maroons)

==== Women's tournament ====
===== Elimination round =====
====== Team standings ======
| Pos | Team | W | L | PCT | GB | Qualification |
|---|---|---|---|---|---|---|
| 1 | NU Lady Bulldogs | 12 | 2 | .857 (Note: Head-to-head record: NU 1–1 La Salle (NU +1)) | — | Twice-to-beat in the semifinals |
| 2 | De La Salle Lady Archers | 12 | 2 | .857 | — | Twice-to-beat in the semifinals |
| 3 | UST Growling Tigresses | 8 | 6 | .571 (Note: Head-to-head record: UST 2–0 Adamson) | 4 | Twice-to-win in the semifinals |
| 4 | Adamson Lady Falcons | 8 | 6 | .571 | 4 | Twice-to-win in the semifinals |
| 5 | FEU Lady Tamaraws (Note: FEU forfeited 5 wins after Vangie Soriano, who participated on those games, played in a ligang labas game while the season was ongoing.) | 7 | 7 | .500 | 5 | |
| 6 | UP Lady Maroons | 6 | 8 | .429 | 6 | |
| 7 | UE Lady Warriors | 2 | 12 | .143 | 10 | |
| 8 | Ateneo Lady Eagles | 1 | 13 | .071 | 11 | |

Source: ABS-CBN Sports
Rules for classification: 1) winning percentage; 2) if tied for #2 or #4, one-game playoff; 3) head-to-head record; 4) head-to-head point differential; 5) overall point differential

===== Playoffs =====
Semifinals (Top 2 twice-to-beat)
1 | NU | 71 | 66
4 | Adamson | 76 | 47
2 | La Salle | 81*
3 | UST | 74

Finals (Best-of-three playoff)
1 | NU | 48 | 67 | 61
2 | La Salle | 72 | 52 | 69

*Overtime

===== Awards =====
- Most Valuable Player: Camille Sambile (FEU Lady Tamaraws)
- Rookie of the Year: Love Joy Sto. Domingo (UE Lady Warriors)

=== Juniors division ===
==== Juniors' tournament ====
===== Elimination round =====
====== Team standings ======
| Pos | Team | W | L | PCT | GB | Qualification |
|---|---|---|---|---|---|---|
| 1 | NUNS Bullpups | 14 | 0 | 1.000 | — | Thrice-to-beat in the Finals (Note: As NSNU won all of their elimination round games, the stepladder format will be used instead of the regular Final Four format.) |
| 2 | Ateneo Blue Eaglets | 11 | 3 | .786 | 3 | Twice-to-beat in stepladder round 2 |
| 3 | Zobel Junior Archers | 9 | 5 | .643 | 5 | Proceed to stepladder round 1 |
| 4 | FEU–D Baby Tamaraws | 8 | 6 | .571 | 6 | Proceed to stepladder round 1 |
| 5 | UE Junior Red Warriors | 5 | 9 | .357 | 9 | |
| 6 | UST Tiger Cubs | 4 | 10 | .286 (Note: Head-to-head record: UST 1–1 UP (UST +4)) | 10 | |
| 7 | UPIS Junior Fighting Maroons | 4 | 10 | .286 | 10 | |
| 8 | Adamson Baby Falcons | 1 | 13 | .071 | 13 | |

Source: ABS-CBN Sports
Rules for classification: 1) winning percentage; 2) if tied for #2 or #4, one-game playoff; 3) head-to-head record; 4) head-to-head point differential; 5) overall point differential

===== Playoffs =====
Stepladder round 1 (Single-elimination)
3 | DLSZ | 55
4 | FEU–FERN | 65*

Stepladder round 2 (No. 2 twice-to-beat)
2 | Ateneo | 69
4 | FEU–FERN | 64

Finals (No. 1 thrice-to-beat)
1 | NU | 101* | 81
2 | Ateneo | 93 | 74

*Overtime

===== Awards =====
- Most Valuable Player: Ferdinand Ravena III (Ateneo Blue Eaglets)
- Rookie of the Year: Aaron Ivan Reyes (UST Tiger Cubs)

== Volleyball ==
The UAAP Season 76 volleyball tournament started on December 1, 2013 at the Araneta Coliseum. The tournament host of the seniors' division is Adamson University while University of the East is tournament host for the juniors' division. The number of participating schools in the girls' tournament increased to six with Adamson University fielding a girls' volleyball team this season.

The UAAP uses the number of wins as the primary criterion for ranking teams. Adamson and La Salle, which were tied with 7 wins in the men's tournament, had a playoff to determine the #4 seed, despite La Salle having more points (23) than Adamson (21); the same happened for Adamson (19 points) and FEU (17 points), which were tied for 4th in the women's tournament with 6 wins.

=== Seniors division ===
==== Men's tournament ====
===== Elimination round =====
====== Team standings ======
| Pos | Team | Pld | W | L | Pts | SW | SL | SR | SPW | SPL | SPR | Qualification |
|---|---|---|---|---|---|---|---|---|---|---|---|---|
| 1 | NU Bulldogs | 14 | 12 | 2 | 32 | 37 | 15 | 2.467 | 1205 | 1038 | 1.161 | Semifinals with a twice-to-beat advantage |
| 2 | Ateneo Blue Eagles | 14 | 11 | 3 | 32 | 36 | 18 | 2.000 | 1261 | 1145 | 1.101 | Semifinals with a twice-to-beat advantage |
| 3 | FEU Tamaraws | 14 | 9 | 5 | 25 | 31 | 23 | 1.348 | 1210 | 1188 | 1.019 | Semifinals |
| 4 | Adamson Soaring Falcons | 14 | 7 | 7 | 21 | 26 | 28 | 0.929 | 1199 | 1214 | 0.988 | Semifinals |
| 5 | De La Salle Green Archers | 14 | 7 | 7 | 23 | 30 | 26 | 1.154 | 1237 | 1213 | 1.020 | Fourth-seed playoff |
| 6 | UST Growling Tigers | 14 | 5 | 9 | 16 | 26 | 32 | 0.813 | 1249 | 1275 | 0.980 | |
| 7 | UP Fighting Maroons | 14 | 4 | 10 | 15 | 21 | 33 | 0.636 | 1152 | 1217 | 0.947 | |
| 8 | UE Red Warriors | 14 | 1 | 13 | 4 | 8 | 40 | 0.200 | 953 | 1176 | 0.810 | |

Rules for classification: Point system: 3 points = win match in 3 or 4 sets; 2 points = win match in 5 sets; 1 point = lose match in 5 sets; 0 point = lose match in 3 or 4 sets

===== Playoffs =====
Fourth-seed playoff
La Salle | 0
Adamson | 3

Semifinals; Top seeds twice-to-beat
1 | NU | 3
4 | Adamson | 0
2 | Ateneo | 3
3 | FEU | 2

Finals; Best-of-three series
1 | NU | 3 | 3
2 | Ateneo | 0 | 1

===== Awards =====
- Most Valuable Player: Marck Jesus Espejo (Ateneo Blue Eagles)
- Rookie of the Year: Marck Jesus Espejo (Ateneo Blue Eagles)

==== Women's tournament ====
===== Elimination round =====
====== Team standings ======
| Pos | Team | Pld | W | L | Pts | SW | SL | SR | SPW | SPL | SPR | Qualification |
|---|---|---|---|---|---|---|---|---|---|---|---|---|
| 1 | De La Salle Lady Archers | 14 | 14 | 0 | 42 | 42 | 2 | 21.000 | 1090 | 753 | 1.448 | Finals |
| 2 | NU Lady Bulldogs | 14 | 12 | 2 | 36 | 37 | 9 | 4.111 | 1119 | 940 | 1.190 | Semifinals with a twice-to-beat advantage |
| 3 | Ateneo Lady Eagles | 14 | 10 | 4 | 28 | 31 | 16 | 1.938 | 1035 | 963 | 1.075 | Semifinals |
| 4 | Adamson Lady Falcons | 14 | 6 | 8 | 19 | 25 | 27 | 0.926 | 1168 | 1133 | 1.031 | Semifinals |
| 5 | FEU Lady Tamaraws | 14 | 6 | 8 | 17 | 21 | 28 | 0.750 | 1043 | 1065 | 0.979 | Fourth-seed playoff |
| 6 | UST Growling Tigresses | 14 | 5 | 9 | 16 | 18 | 30 | 0.600 | 1030 | 1075 | 0.958 | |
| 7 | UP Lady Maroons | 14 | 3 | 11 | 10 | 12 | 34 | 0.353 | 893 | 1068 | 0.836 | |
| 8 | UE Lady Warriors | 14 | 0 | 14 | 0 | 3 | 42 | 0.071 | 735 | 1116 | 0.659 | |

Rules for classification: Point system: 3 points = win match in 3 or 4 sets; 2 points = win match in 5 sets; 1 point = lose match in 5 sets; 0 point = lose match in 3 or 4 sets

===== Playoffs =====
4th–seed playoff (One–game playoff)
4 | Adamson | 3
5 | FEU | 2

First round (One–game playoff)
3 | Ateneo | 3
4 | Adamson | 0

Semifinals (No. 2 seed has twice-to-beat advantage)
2 | NU | 1 | 1
3 | Ateneo | 3 | 3

Finals (No. 1 seed has thrice-to-beat advantage)
1 | La Salle | 1 | 3 | 2 | 0
3 | Ateneo | 3 | 1 | 3 | 3

===== Awards =====
- Most Valuable Player: Alyssa Valdez (Ateneo Lady Eagles)
- Rookie of the Year: Jaja Santiago (NU Lady Bulldogs)

=== Juniors division ===
==== Boys' tournament ====
===== Elimination round =====
====== Team standings ======
| Pos | Team | Pld | W | L | Pts | SW | SL | SR | SPW | SPL | SPR | Qualification |
|---|---|---|---|---|---|---|---|---|---|---|---|---|
| 1 | NUNS Bullpups | 9 | 8 | 1 | 24 | 3 | 0 | MAX | 0 | 0 | — | Finals |
| 2 | UE Junior Red Warriors | 9 | 8 | 1 | 24 | 0 | 0 | — | 0 | 0 | — | Finals |
| 3 | Ateneo Blue Eaglets | 9 | 6 | 3 | 18 | 9 | 3 | 3.000 | 77 | 58 | 1.328 | |
| 4 | UST Tiger Cubs | 9 | 3 | 6 | 9 | 0 | 3 | 0.000 | 58 | 77 | 0.753 | |
| 5 | Zobel Junior Archers | 9 | 2 | 7 | 6 | 0 | 0 | — | 0 | 0 | — | |
| 6 | UPIS Junior Fighting Maroons | 9 | 0 | 9 | 0 | 0 | 0 | — | 0 | 0 | — | |

Rules for classification: Point system: 3 points = win match in 3 or 4 sets; 2 points = win match in 5 sets; 1 point = lose match in 5 sets; 0 point = lose match in 3 or 4 sets

===== Awards =====
- Most Valuable Player: junior (Ateneo Blue Eagles)
- Rookie of the Year: Armel Amuan (NUNS Bullpups)

==== Girls' tournament ====
===== Elimination round =====
====== Team standings ======
| Pos | Team | Pld | W | L | Pts | SW | SL | SR | SPW | SPL | SPR | Qualification |
|---|---|---|---|---|---|---|---|---|---|---|---|---|
| 1 | UST Junior Tigresses | 10 | 9 | 1 | 28 | 2 | 3 | 0.667 | 0 | 0 | — | Finals |
| 2 | NUNS Lady Bullpups | 10 | 9 | 1 | 26 | 6 | 2 | 3.000 | 0 | 0 | — | Finals |
| 3 | Zobel Junior Lady Archers | 9 | 6 | 3 | 18 | 0 | 0 | — | 0 | 0 | — | |
| 4 | UE Junior Lady Warriors | 9 | 3 | 6 | 9 | 0 | 0 | — | 0 | 0 | — | |
| 5 | Adamson Lady Baby Falcons | 9 | 2 | 7 | 6 | 0 | 3 | 0.000 | 0 | 0 | — | |
| 6 | UPIS Junior Lady Maroons | 9 | 0 | 9 | 0 | 0 | 0 | — | 0 | 0 | — | |

Rules for classification: 3 points = win match in 3 or 4 sets; 2 points = win match in 5 sets; 1 point = lose match in 5 sets; 0 point = lose match in 3 or 4 sets

===== Awards =====
- Most Valuable Player: Ennajie Laure (UST Junior Tigresses)
- Rookie of the Year: Faith Nisperos (NUNS Lady Bullpups)

== Beach volleyball ==
The UAAP Season 76 beach volleyball tournament began on August 31, 2013 at the University of the East (UE) sand courts in Caloocan, Metro Manila. The tournament host is University of the East.

=== Men's tournament ===
==== Elimination round ====
Team standings

| Rank | Team | W | L | PCT |
|---|---|---|---|---|
| 1 | NU Bulldogs | 7 | 0 | 1.000 |
| 2 | UST Growling Tigers | 6 | 1 | .857 |
| 3 | UP Fighting Maroons | 4 | 3 | .571 |
| 4 | FEU Tamaraws | 3 | 4 | .429 |
| 5 | Adamson Soaring Falcons | 3 | 4 | .429 |
| 6 | Ateneo Blue Eagles | 3 | 4 | .429 |
| 7 | UE Red Warriors | 2 | 5 | .285 |
| 8 | De La Salle Green Archers | 0 | 7 | .000 |

Qualified to the Finals with the thrice-to-beat advantage
Qualified to the semifinals with the twice-to-beat advantage
Qualified to the semifinals first-round playoff
Qualified to fourth-seed playoff

Match-up results

| Team ╲ Game | 1 | 2 | 3 | 4 | 5 | 6 | 7 |
|---|---|---|---|---|---|---|---|
| AdMU | UE school colors | UP school colors | Adamson school colors | FEU school colors | NU school colors | La Salle school colors | UST school colors |
| AdU | NU school colors | FEU school colors | Ateneo school colors | UST school colors | UP school colors | UE school colors | La Salle school colors |
| DLSU | FEU school colors | NU school colors | UST school colors | UE school colors | Ateneo school colors | UP school colors | Adamson school colors |
| FEU | La Salle school colors | UP school colors | Adamson school colors | Ateneo school colors | UST school colors | UE school colors | NU school colors |
| NU | Adamson school colors | UE school colors | La Salle school colors | UP school colors | Ateneo school colors | UST school colors | FEU school colors |
| UE | Ateneo school colors | NU school colors | UST school colors | La Salle school colors | FEU school colors | Adamson school colors | UP school colors |
| UP | UST school colors | FEU school colors | Ateneo school colors | NU school colors | Adamson school colors | La Salle school colors | UE school colors |
| UST | UP school colors | UE school colors | La Salle school colors | Adamson school colors | FEU school colors | NU school colors | Ateneo school colors |

= Win; = Loss

==== Playoffs ====
4th–seed playoff (One–game playoff)
4 | FEU | 0
5 | Adamson | 2

First round (One–game playoff)
3 | UP | 0
4 | Adamson | 2

Semifinals (No. 2 seed has twice-to-beat advantage)
2 | UST | 2
4 | Adamson | 0

Finals (No. 1 seed has to win twice; opponent thrice)
1 | NU | 0 | 2 | 2
2 | UST | 2 | 1 | 0

==== Awards ====
- Most Valuable Player: Edwin Tolentino (NU Bulldogs)
- Rookie of the Year: Kris Roy Guzman (UST Growling Tigers)

=== Women's tournament ===
==== Elimination round ====
Team standings

| Rank | Team | W | L | PCT |
|---|---|---|---|---|
| 1 | UST Growling Tigresses | 6 | 1 | .857 |
| 2 | Adamson Lady Falcons | 6 | 1 | .857 |
| 3 | Ateneo Lady Eagles | 5 | 2 | .714 |
| 4 | De La Salle Lady Archers | 4 | 3 | .571 |
| 5 | UE Lady Warriors | 3 | 4 | .429 |
| 6 | NU Lady Bulldogs | 3 | 4 | .429 |
| 7 | FEU Lady Tamaraws | 1 | 6 | .143 |
| 8 | UP Lady Maroons | 0 | 7 | .000 |

Qualified to the semifinals with the twice-to-beat advantage
Qualified to the semifinals

Match-up results

| Team ╲ Game | 1 | 2 | 3 | 4 | 5 | 6 | 7 |
|---|---|---|---|---|---|---|---|
| AdMU | NU school colors | FEU school colors | La Salle school colors | Adamson school colors | UST school colors | UP school colors | UE school colors |
| AdU | UP school colors | FEU school colors | La Salle school colors | Ateneo school colors | UE school colors | NU school colors | UST school colors |
| DLSU | UST school colors | Adamson school colors | Ateneo school colors | UE school colors | FEU school colors | NU school colors | UP school colors |
| FEU | UE school colors | Adamson school colors | Ateneo school colors | UST school colors | La Salle school colors | UP school colors | NU school colors |
| NU | Ateneo school colors | UST school colors | UE school colors | UP school colors | Adamson school colors | La Salle school colors | FEU school colors |
| UE | FEU school colors | NU school colors | UP school colors | La Salle school colors | Adamson school colors | UST school colors | Ateneo school colors |
| UP | Adamson school colors | UST school colors | UE school colors | NU school colors | Ateneo school colors | FEU school colors | La Salle school colors |
| UST | La Salle school colors | NU school colors | UP school colors | FEU school colors | Ateneo school colors | UE school colors | Adamson school colors |

= Win; = Loss

==== Playoffs ====
Semifinals (Nos. 1 & 2 have twice-to-beat advantage)
1 | UST | 0 | 2
4 | La Salle | 2 | 1
2 | Adamson | 2
3 | Ateneo | 0

Finals (Best-of-three series)
1 | UST | 1 | 1
2 | Adamson | 2 | 2

==== Awards ====
- Most Valuable Player: Bang Pineda (Adamson Lady Falcons)
- Rookie of the Year: Kyla Atienza (FEU Lady Tamaraws)

== Football ==
The UAAP Season 76 football tournament began on November 23, 2013 at the football field of the Far Eastern University in Diliman, Quezon City. The tournament host is Far Eastern University.

=== Men's tournament ===
==== Elimination round ====
===== Team standings =====
| Pos | Team | Pld | W | D | L | GF | GA | GD | Pts | Qualification |
|---|---|---|---|---|---|---|---|---|---|---|
| 1 | FEU Tamaraws | 12 | 11 | 0 | 1 | 26 | 8 | +18 | 33 | Twice-to-beat in the semifinals |
| 2 | UP Fighting Maroons | 12 | 8 | 1 | 3 | 25 | 9 | +16 | 25 | Twice-to-beat in the semifinals |
| 3 | UST Growling Tigers | 12 | 5 | 2 | 5 | 16 | 19 | −3 | 17 | Twice-to-win in the semifinals |
| 4 | De La Salle Green Archers | 12 | 5 | 2 | 5 | 14 | 17 | −3 | 17 | Twice-to-win in the semifinals |
| 5 | UE Red Warriors | 12 | 3 | 3 | 6 | 12 | 16 | −4 | 12 | |
| 6 | NU Bulldogs | 12 | 3 | 1 | 8 | 13 | 23 | −10 | 10 | |
| 7 | Ateneo Blue Eagles | 12 | 1 | 3 | 8 | 7 | 21 | −14 | 6 | |

Source: ABS-CBN Sports

===== Match-up results =====
| | Round 1 | | | | | | Round 2 | | | | | |
| Team ╲ Game | 1 | 2 | 3 | 4 | 5 | 6 | 7 | 8 | 9 | 10 | 11 | 12 |
|---|---|---|---|---|---|---|---|---|---|---|---|---|
| AdMU | FEU school colors | UST school colors | UE school colors | UP school colors | La Salle school colors | NU school colors | UE school colors | La Salle school colors | FEU school colors | NU school colors | UST school colors | UP school colors |
| DLSU | UST school colors | UE school colors | UP school colors | NU school colors | Ateneo school colors | FEU school colors | UST school colors | Ateneo school colors | UE school colors | UP school colors | FEU school colors | NU school colors |
| FEU | NU school colors | Ateneo school colors | UST school colors | UE school colors | UP school colors | La Salle school colors | UP school colors | Ateneo school colors | UST school colors | NU school colors | La Salle school colors | UE school colors |
| NU | FEU school colors | UST school colors | UE school colors | UP school colors | La Salle school colors | Ateneo school colors | UP school colors | UST school colors | UE school colors | FEU school colors | Ateneo school colors | La Salle school colors |
| UE | UP school colors | La Salle school colors | NU school colors | Ateneo school colors | FEU school colors | UST school colors | Ateneo school colors | La Salle school colors | NU school colors | UST school colors | UP school colors | FEU school colors |
| UP | UE school colors | La Salle school colors | NU school colors | Ateneo school colors | FEU school colors | UST school colors | NU school colors | FEU school colors | UST school colors | La Salle school colors | UE school colors | Ateneo school colors |
| UST | La Salle school colors | NU school colors | Ateneo school colors | FEU school colors | UE school colors | UP school colors | La Salle school colors | NU school colors | UP school colors | FEU school colors | UE school colors | Ateneo school colors |

= Win; = Draw; = Loss

==== Playoffs ====
Semifinals (Nos. 1 & 2 have twice-to-beat advantage)
1 | FEU | 2
4 | La Salle | 1
2 | UP | 5
3 | UST | 1

Finals (Best-of-three series)
1 | FEU | 4 | 1
2 | UP | 1 | 0

==== Awards ====
- Most Valuable Player: Paolo Bugas (FEU Tamaraws)
- Rookie of the Year: Francisco Jose Primo Santos (UP Fighting Maroons)

=== Women's tournament ===
==== Elimination round ====
===== Team standings =====
| Pos | Team | Pld | W | D | L | GF | GA | GD | Pts | Qualification |
|---|---|---|---|---|---|---|---|---|---|---|
| 1 | UST Growling Tigresses | 8 | 3 | 4 | 1 | 7 | 4 | +3 | 13 | Twice-to-beat in the finals |
| 2 | FEU Lady Tamaraws | 8 | 3 | 3 | 2 | 9 | 4 | +5 | 12 | Twice-to-win in the finals |
| 3 | Ateneo Lady Eagles | 8 | 2 | 5 | 1 | 8 | 7 | +1 | 11 | |
| 4 | UP Lady Maroons | 8 | 3 | 2 | 3 | 10 | 10 | 0 | 11 | |
| 5 | De La Salle Lady Archers | 8 | 1 | 2 | 5 | 7 | 16 | −9 | 5 | |

Source: ABS-CBN Sports

===== Match-up results =====
| | Round 1 | | | | Round 2 | | | |
| Team ╲ Game | 1 | 2 | 3 | 4 | 5 | 6 | 7 | 8 |
|---|---|---|---|---|---|---|---|---|
| AdMU | UST school colors | FEU school colors | La Salle school colors | UP school colors | La Salle school colors | FEU school colors | UP school colors | UST school colors |
| DLSU | UP school colors | UST school colors | FEU school colors | Ateneo school colors | UST school colors | Ateneo school colors | FEU school colors | UP school colors |
| FEU | Ateneo school colors | La Salle school colors | UP school colors | UST school colors | UP school colors | Ateneo school colors | UST school colors | La Salle school colors |
| UP | La Salle school colors | UST school colors | FEU school colors | Ateneo school colors | FEU school colors | UST school colors | Ateneo school colors | La Salle school colors |
| UST | Ateneo school colors | La Salle school colors | UP school colors | FEU school colors | La Salle school colors | FEU school colors | UP school colors | Ateneo school colors |

= Win; = Draw; = Loss

==== Awards ====
- Most Valuable Player: Mae Sullano (FEU Lady Tamaraws)
- Rookie of the Year: Mary Rose Obra (UP Lady Maroons)

=== Boys' tournament ===
==== Elimination round ====
===== Team standings =====
| Pos | Team | Pld | W | D | L | GF | GA | GD | Pts | Qualification |
|---|---|---|---|---|---|---|---|---|---|---|
| 1 | FEU–D Baby Tamaraws | 6 | 5 | 1 | 0 | 29 | 3 | +26 | 16 | Twice-to-beat in the finals |
| 2 | Ateneo Blue Eaglets | 6 | 4 | 1 | 1 | 23 | 9 | +14 | 13 | Twice-to-win in the finals |
| 3 | Zobel Junior Archers | 6 | 2 | 0 | 4 | 7 | 16 | −9 | 6 | |
| 4 | UST Tiger Cubs | 6 | 0 | 0 | 6 | 4 | 35 | −31 | 0 | |

Source: ABS-CBN Sports

===== Match-up results =====
| | Round 1 | | | Round 2 | | |
| Team ╲ Game | 1 | 2 | 3 | 4 | 5 | 6 |
|---|---|---|---|---|---|---|
| AdMU | La Salle school colors | UST school colors | FEU school colors | La Salle school colors | UST school colors | FEU school colors |
| DLSZ | Ateneo school colors | FEU school colors | UST school colors | Ateneo school colors | FEU school colors | UST school colors |
| FEU | UST school colors | La Salle school colors | Ateneo school colors | UST school colors | La Salle school colors | Ateneo school colors |
| UST | FEU school colors | Ateneo school colors | La Salle school colors | FEU school colors | Ateneo school colors | La Salle school colors |

= Win; = Draw; = Loss

==== Awards ====
- Most Valuable Player: Janryl Balanueco (FEU–D Baby Tamaraws)
- Rookie of the Year: Earl Laguerta (FEU–D Baby Tamaraws)

== Baseball ==
The UAAP Season 76 baseball tournament began on January 5, 2014 at the Rizal Memorial Baseball Stadium in Malate Manila. The tournament host is University of Santo Tomas.

=== Men's tournament ===
==== Elimination round ====
Team standings

| Rank | Team | GP | W | L | PCT |
|---|---|---|---|---|---|
| 1 | De La Salle Green Archers | 10 | 9 | 1 | .900 |
| 2 | Ateneo Blue Eagles | 10 | 7 | 3 | .700 |
| 3 | NU Bulldogs | 10 | 5 | 5 | .500 |
| 4 | UST Growling Tigers | 10 | 3 | 7 | .300 |
| 5 | UP Fighting Maroons | 10 | 3 | 7 | .300 |
| 6 | Adamson Soaring Falcons | 10 | 3 | 7 | .300 |

Qualified to the Finals with the twice-to-beat advantage
Qualified to the Finals
Qualified to second-seed playoff

Match-up results

| | Round 1 | | | | | Round 2 | | | | |
| Team ╲ Game | 1 | 2 | 3 | 4 | 5 | 6 | 7 | 8 | 9 | 10 |
|---|---|---|---|---|---|---|---|---|---|---|
| AdU | Ateneo school colors | UP school colors | NU school colors | La Salle school colors | UST school colors | UP school colors | Ateneo school colors | NU school colors | La Salle school colors | UST school colors |
| AdMU | Adamson school colors | La Salle school colors | UP school colors | UST school colors | NU school colors | NU school colors | Adamson school colors | UST school colors | UP school colors | La Salle school colors |
| DLSU | NU school colors | Ateneo school colors | UST school colors | Adamson school colors | UP school colors | UST school colors | NU school colors | UP school colors | Adamson school colors | Ateneo school colors |
| NU | La Salle school colors | UST school colors | Adamson school colors | UP school colors | Ateneo school colors | Ateneo school colors | La Salle school colors | Adamson school colors | UST school colors | UP school colors |
| UP | UST school colors | Adamson school colors | Ateneo school colors | NU school colors | La Salle school colors | Adamson school colors | UST school colors | La Salle school colors | Ateneo school colors | NU school colors |
| UST | UP school colors | NU school colors | La Salle school colors | Ateneo school colors | Adamson school colors | La Salle school colors | UP school colors | Ateneo school colors | NU school colors | Adamson school colors |

= Win; = Loss

==== Finals ====
| February 15 | Ateneo Blue Eagles | 10–8 (F/10) | De La Salle Green Archers | Rizal Memorial Baseball Stadium |

| February 18 | Ateneo Blue Eagles | 8–3 | De La Salle Green Archers | Rizal Memorial Baseball Stadium |

Ateneo wins series 2–0

==== Awards ====
- Most Valuable Players: Andrew Antonio Augustine Tan (Ateneo Blue Eagles)
- Rookie of the Year: Miguel Dumlao (Ateneo Blue Eagles)

=== Boys' tournament ===
==== Elimination round ====
Team standings

| Rank | Team | GP | W | L | PCT |
|---|---|---|---|---|---|
| 1 | Ateneo Blue Eaglets | 4 | 3 | 1 | .750 |
| 2 | Zobel Junior Archers | 4 | 3 | 1 | .750 |
| 3 | UST Tiger Cubs | 4 | 0 | 4 | .000 |

Qualified to the Finals with the twice-to-beat advantage
Qualified to the Finals
Qualified to second-seed playoff

Match-up results

| | Round 1 | | Round 2 | |
| Team ╲ Game | 1 | 2 | 3 | 4 |
|---|---|---|---|---|
| AdMU | UST school colors | La Salle school colors | UST school colors | La Salle school colors |
| DLSZ | UST school colors | Ateneo school colors | UST school colors | Ateneo school colors |
| UST | La Salle school colors | Ateneo school colors | Ateneo school colors | La Salle school colors |

= Win; = Loss

==== Awards ====
- Most Valuable Player: Jose Maria Emmanuel Tantuico (Zobel Junior Archers)
- Rookie of the Year: Angelo Raphael Tantuico (Zobel Junior Archers)

== Softball ==
The UAAP Season 76 softball tournament began on December 4, 2013 at the baseball diamond of the Rizal Memorial Sports Complex in Malate Manila. The tournament host is University of Santo Tomas.

=== Women's tournament ===
==== Elimination round ====
===== Team standings =====
| Rank | Team | GP | W | L | PCT |
|---|---|---|---|---|---|
| 1 | Adamson Lady Falcons | 12 | 12 | 0 | 1.000 |
| 2 | NU Lady Bulldogs | 12 | 9 | 3 | 0.750 |
| 3 | UST Growling Tigresses | 12 | 8 | 4 | 0.667 |
| 4 | UE Lady Warriors | 12 | 5 | 7 | 0.417 |
| 5 | UP Lady Maroons | 12 | 4 | 8 | 0.333 |
| 6 | De La Salle Lady Archers | 12 | 2 | 10 | 0.167 |
| 7 | Ateneo Lady Eagles | 12 | 2 | 10 | 0.167 |

Qualified to the Finals with the thrice-to-beat advantage
Qualified to the semifinals with the twice-to-beat advantage
Qualified to the semifinals first-round playoff

===== Match-up results =====
| | Round 1 | | | | | | Round 2 | | | | | |
| Team ╲ Game | 1 | 2 | 3 | 4 | 5 | 6 | 7 | 8 | 9 | 10 | 11 | 12 |
|---|---|---|---|---|---|---|---|---|---|---|---|---|
| AdU | UST school colors | UE school colors | La Salle school colors | NU school colors | UP school colors | Ateneo school colors | NU school colors | UP school colors | Ateneo school colors | UST school colors | UE school colors | La Salle school colors |
| AdMU | UST school colors | UE school colors | La Salle school colors | NU school colors | UP school colors | Adamson school colors | UE school colors | La Salle school colors | UST school colors | Adamson school colors | NU school colors | UP school colors |
| DLSU | NU school colors | UP school colors | Ateneo school colors | Adamson school colors | UST school colors | UE school colors | UP school colors | Ateneo school colors | NU school colors | UST school colors | UE school colors | Adamson school colors |
| NU | La Salle school colors | UP school colors | Ateneo school colors | Adamson school colors | UST school colors | UE school colors | Adamson school colors | La Salle school colors | UP school colors | Ateneo school colors | UST school colors | UE school colors |
| UE | UP school colors | Ateneo school colors | Adamson school colors | UST school colors | La Salle school colors | NU school colors | Ateneo school colors | UST school colors | UP school colors | La Salle school colors | Adamson school colors | NU school colors |
| UP | UE school colors | La Salle school colors | NU school colors | Ateneo school colors | Adamson school colors | UST school colors | La Salle school colors | Adamson school colors | UE school colors | NU school colors | Ateneo school colors | UST school colors |
| UST | Ateneo school colors | Adamson school colors | UE school colors | La Salle school colors | NU school colors | UP school colors | UE school colors | Ateneo school colors | La Salle school colors | Adamson school colors | NU school colors | UP school colors |

= Win; = Loss

==== Finals ====
| February 18 | Adamson Lady Falcons | 11–3 (F/6) | NU Lady Bulldogs | Rizal Memorial Baseball Stadium |

| February 21 | Adamson Lady Falcons | 8–1 | NU Lady Bulldogs | Rizal Memorial Baseball Stadium |

Adamson wins series in two games

==== Awards ====
- Most Valuable Player: Analie Benjamen (Adamson Lady Falcons)
- Rookie of the Year: Roxelle Pearl Niloban (UE Lady Warriors)

== Badminton ==
The UAAP Season 76 badminton tournament began on September 1, 2013 at the Jumpsmash Badminton Center in Quezon City. The tournament host is National University.

=== Men's tournament ===
==== Elimination round ====
Team standings

| Rank | Team | GP | W | L | PCT |
|---|---|---|---|---|---|
| 1 | Ateneo Blue Eagles | 7 | 7 | 0 | 1.000 |
| 2 | NU Bulldogs | 7 | 5 | 2 | 0.714 |
| 3 | UST Growling Tigers | 7 | 5 | 2 | 0.714 |
| 4 | De La Salle Green Archers | 7 | 4 | 3 | 0.571 |
| 5 | UP Fighting Maroons | 7 | 4 | 3 | 0.571 |
| 6 | FEU Tamaraws | 7 | 2 | 5 | 0.286 |
| 7 | Adamson Soaring Falcons | 7 | 1 | 6 | 0.143 |
| 8 | UE Red Warriors | 7 | 0 | 7 | 0.000 |

Qualified to the Finals with the thrice-to-beat advantage
Qualified to the semifinals with the twice-to-beat advantage
Qualified to the semifinals first-round playoff
Qualified to fourth-seed playoff

Match-up results

| Team ╲ Game | 1 | 2 | 3 | 4 | 5 | 6 | 7 |
|---|---|---|---|---|---|---|---|
| AdMU | UST school colors | UP school colors | La Salle school colors | Adamson school colors | UE school colors | FEU school colors | NU school colors |
| AdU | FEU school colors | La Salle school colors | UP school colors | Ateneo school colors | NU school colors | UST school colors | UE school colors |
| DLSU | NU school colors | Adamson school colors | Ateneo school colors | UE school colors | FEU school colors | UP school colors | UST school colors |
| FEU | Adamson school colors | NU school colors | UE school colors | UST school colors | La Salle school colors | Ateneo school colors | UP school colors |
| NU | La Salle school colors | FEU school colors | UST school colors | UP school colors | Adamson school colors | UE school colors | Ateneo school colors |
| UE | UP school colors | UST school colors | FEU school colors | La Salle school colors | Ateneo school colors | NU school colors | Adamson school colors |
| UP | UE school colors | Ateneo school colors | Adamson school colors | NU school colors | UST school colors | La Salle school colors | FEU school colors |
| UST | Ateneo school colors | UE school colors | NU school colors | FEU school colors | UP school colors | Adamson school colors | La Salle school colors |

= Win; = Loss

==== Playoffs ====
Seeding playoff (One–game playoff)
For 2nd seed
3 | NU | 3
6 | UST | 2
For 4th seed
4 | UP | 3
5 | La Salle | 2

First round (One-tie playoff)
3 | UST | 3
4 | UP | 2

Semifinals (No. 2 seed has twice-to-beat advantage)
2 | NU | 3
3 | UST | 1

Finals (No. 1 seed has thrice-to-beat advantage)
1 | Ateneo | 2 | 3 | 3
2 | NU | 3 | 0 | 2

==== Awards ====
- Most Valuable Player: Patrick Wilfred Natividad (Ateneo Blue Eagles)
- Rookie of the Year: Ros Leenard Pedrosa (NU Bulldogs)

=== Women's tournament ===
==== Elimination round ====
Team standings

| Rank | Team | GP | W | L | PCT | Tie |
|---|---|---|---|---|---|---|
| 1 | Ateneo Lady Eagles | 7 | 7 | 0 | 1.000 | |
| 2 | De La Salle Lady Archers | 7 | 5 | 2 | 0.714 | 7–3 |
| 3 | FEU Lady Tamaraws | 7 | 5 | 2 | 0.714 | 5–5 |
| 4 | UP Lady Maroons | 7 | 5 | 2 | 0.714 | 3–7 |
| 5 | UST Growling Tigresses | 7 | 3 | 4 | 0.429 | |
| 6 | UE Lady Warriors | 7 | 2 | 5 | 0.286 | |
| 7 | Adamson Lady Falcons | 7 | 1 | 6 | 0.143 | |
| 8 | NU Lady Bulldogs | 7 | 0 | 7 | 0.000 | |

Qualified to the Finals with the thrice-to-beat advantage
Qualified to the semifinals with the twice-to-beat advantage
Qualified to the semifinals first-round playoff
Note: Tiebreaker was head-to-head records (matches won-lost) among tied teams.

Match-up results

| Team ╲ Game | 1 | 2 | 3 | 4 | 5 | 6 | 7 |
|---|---|---|---|---|---|---|---|
| AdMU | La Salle school colors | UE school colors | UST school colors | UP school colors | Adamson school colors | NU school colors | FEU school colors |
| AdU | UE school colors | La Salle school colors | UP school colors | FEU school colors | Ateneo school colors | UST school colors | NU school colors |
| DLSU | Ateneo school colors | Adamson school colors | FEU school colors | NU school colors | UE school colors | UP school colors | UST school colors |
| FEU | UST school colors | UP school colors | La Salle school colors | Adamson school colors | NU school colors | UE school colors | Ateneo school colors |
| NU | UP school colors | UST school colors | UE school colors | La Salle school colors | FEU school colors | Ateneo school colors | Adamson school colors |
| UE | Adamson school colors | Ateneo school colors | NU school colors | UST school colors | La Salle school colors | FEU school colors | UP school colors |
| UP | NU school colors | FEU school colors | Adamson school colors | Ateneo school colors | UST school colors | La Salle school colors | UE school colors |
| UST | FEU school colors | NU school colors | Ateneo school colors | UE school colors | UP school colors | Adamson school colors | La Salle school colors |

= Win; = Loss

==== Playoffs ====
Seeding playoff (One–game playoff)
For 2nd seed
3 | La Salle | 3
6 | FEU | 1

First round (One-tie playoff)
3 | FEU | 1
4 | UP | 3

Semifinals (No. 2 seed has twice-to-beat advantage)
2 | La Salle | 3
4 | UP | 0

Finals (No. 1 seed has thrice-to-beat advantage)
1 | Ateneo | 3 | 3
2 | La Salle | 1 | 2

==== Awards ====
- Most Valuable Player: Maria Bianca Ysabel Carlos (Ateneo Lady Eagles)
- Rookie of the Year: Maria Bianca Ysabel Carlos (Ateneo Lady Eagles)

== Table tennis ==
The UAAP Table Tennis tournament began on September 14, 2013 at the Blue Eagle Gym of the Ateneo de Manila University in Katipunan Ave., Loyola Heights, Quezon City. The tournament host is Ateneo de Manila University.

=== Seniors division ===
==== Men's tournament ====
===== Elimination round =====
====== Team standings ======
| Rank | Team | GP | W | L | PCT |
|---|---|---|---|---|---|
| 1 | De La Salle Green Archers | 14 | 13 | 1 | .929 |
| 2 | FEU Tamaraws | | 5 | 2 | .714 |
| 3 | UE Red Warriors | | 4 | 2 | .667 |
| 4 | UST Growling Tigers | | 3 | 2 | .600 |
| 5 | NU Bulldogs | | 4 | 2 | .667 |
| 6 | UP Fighting Maroons | | 5 | 9 | .357 |
| 7 | Adamson Soaring Falcons | | 2 | 4 | .333 |
| 8 | Ateneo Blue Eagles | 14 | 0 | 14 | .000 |

Incomplete Win–loss data

Qualified to the semifinals with the twice-to-beat advantage
Qualified to the semifinals

====== Match-up results ======
| | Round 1 | | | | | | | Round 2 | | | | | | |
| Team ╲ Game | 1 | 2 | 3 | 4 | 5 | 6 | 7 | 8 | 9 | 10 | 11 | 12 | 13 | 14 |
|---|---|---|---|---|---|---|---|---|---|---|---|---|---|---|
| AdU | La Salle school colors | UP school colors | UE school colors | Ateneo school colors | NU school colors | FEU school colors | UST school colors | La Salle school colors | UP school colors | Ateneo school colors | UST school colors | UE school colors | NU school colors | FEU school colors |
| AdMU | NU school colors | La Salle school colors | UP school colors | Adamson school colors | FEU school colors | UST school colors | UE school colors | UP school colors | La Salle school colors | Adamson school colors | FEU school colors | NU school colors | UST school colors | UE school colors |
| DLSU | Adamson school colors | Ateneo school colors | FEU school colors | NU school colors | UST school colors | UE school colors | UP school colors | Adamson school colors | Ateneo school colors | UE school colors | NU school colors | FEU school colors | UP school colors | UST school colors |
| FEU | UE school colors | UST school colors | La Salle school colors | UP school colors | Ateneo school colors | Adamson school colors | NU school colors | NU school colors | UST school colors | UP school colors | Ateneo school colors | La Salle school colors | UE school colors | Adamson school colors |
| NU | Ateneo school colors | UE school colors | UST school colors | La Salle school colors | Adamson school colors | UP school colors | FEU school colors | FEU school colors | UE school colors | UST school colors | La Salle school colors | Ateneo school colors | Adamson school colors | UP school colors |
| UE | FEU school colors | NU school colors | Adamson school colors | UST school colors | UP school colors | La Salle school colors | Ateneo school colors | UST school colors | NU school colors | La Salle school colors | UP school colors | Adamson school colors | FEU school colors | Ateneo school colors |
| UP | UST school colors | Adamson school colors | Ateneo school colors | FEU school colors | UE school colors | NU school colors | La Salle school colors | Ateneo school colors | Adamson school colors | FEU school colors | UE school colors | UST school colors | La Salle school colors | NU school colors |
| UST | UP school colors | FEU school colors | NU school colors | UE school colors | La Salle school colors | Ateneo school colors | Adamson school colors | UE school colors | FEU school colors | NU school colors | Adamson school colors | UP school colors | Ateneo school colors | La Salle school colors |

= Win; = Loss

===== Awards =====
- Most Valuable Player: Walden Shayne Ledesma (De La Salle Green Archers)
- Rookie of the Year: John Russel Misal (NU Bulldogs)

==== Women's tournament ====
===== Elimination round =====
====== Team standings ======
| Rank | Team | GP | W | L | PCT |
|---|---|---|---|---|---|
| 1 | De La Salle Lady Archers | 12 | 12 | 0 | 1.000 |
| 2 | UP Lady Maroons | 12 | 10 | 2 | 0.833 |
| 3 | UST Growling Tigresses | | 2 | 2 | |
| 4 | FEU Lady Tamaraws | | 0 | 3 | |
| 5 | NU Lady Bulldogs | | 0 | 3 | |
| 6 | Ateneo Lady Eagles | 12 | 3 | 9 | 0.250 |
| 7 | Adamson Lady Falcons | | 0 | 5 | |

Incomplete Win–loss data

Qualified to the Finals with the thrice-to-beat advantage
Qualified to the semifinals with the twice-to-beat advantage
Qualified to the semifinals first-round playoff

====== Match-up results ======
| | Round 1 | | | | | | Round 2 | | | | | |
| Team ╲ Game | 1 | 2 | 3 | 4 | 5 | 6 | 7 | 8 | 9 | 10 | 11 | 12 |
|---|---|---|---|---|---|---|---|---|---|---|---|---|
| AdU | UP school colors | | UST school colors | Ateneo school colors | La Salle school colors | FEU school colors | La Salle school colors | NU school colors | UST school colors | Ateneo school colors | UP school colors | FEU school colors |
| AdMU | La Salle school colors | NU school colors | UP school colors | Adamson school colors | FEU school colors | UST school colors | FEU school colors | La Salle school colors | UP school colors | Adamson school colors | UST school colors | NU school colors |
| DLSU | Ateneo school colors | FEU school colors | NU school colors | UST school colors | Adamson school colors | UP school colors | Adamson school colors | Ateneo school colors | FEU school colors | UST school colors | NU school colors | UP school colors |
| FEU | | La Salle school colors | | UP school colors | Ateneo school colors | Adamson school colors | Ateneo school colors | UP school colors | La Salle school colors | | | Adamson school colors |
| NU | UST school colors | Ateneo school colors | La Salle school colors | | UP school colors | | | Adamson school colors | | UP school colors | La Salle school colors | Ateneo school colors |
| UP | Adamson school colors | UST school colors | Ateneo school colors | FEU school colors | NU school colors | La Salle school colors | UST school colors | FEU school colors | Ateneo school colors | NU school colors | Adamson school colors | La Salle school colors |
| UST | NU school colors | UP school colors | Adamson school colors | La Salle school colors | | Ateneo school colors | UP school colors | | Adamson school colors | La Salle school colors | Ateneo school colors | |

= Win; = Loss

===== Playoffs =====
Stepladder round 1 (One-game playoff)
3 | UST | 3
4 | FEU | ?

Stepladder round 2 (No. 2 has twice-to-beat advantage)
2 | UP | 3
3 | UST | 0

Finals (No. 1 seed has thrice-to-beat advantage)
1 | La Salle | 1 | 1 | 2
2 | UP | 3 | 3 | 3

===== Awards =====
- Most Valuable Player: Joma Illa Sibal (UP Lady Maroons)
- Rookie of the Year: Noriko Nishino (UP Lady Maroons)

=== Juniors division ===
==== Boys' tournament ====
===== Elimination round =====
====== Team standings ======
| Rank | Team | GP | W | L | PCT |
|---|---|---|---|---|---|
| 1 | UE Junior Red Warriors | 12 | 10 | 2 | 0.833 |
| 2 | NUNS Bullpups | 12 | 9 | 3 | 0.750 |
| 3 | UST Tiger Cubs | 12 | | | |
| 4 | Ateneo Blue Eaglets | 12 | | | |
| | Adamson Baby Falcons | 12 | | | |
| | Zobel Junior Archers | 12 | | | |
| | UPIS Junior Fighting Maroons | 12 | | | |

Incomplete Win–loss data

Qualified to the Finals with the thrice-to-beat advantage
Qualified to the semifinals with the twice-to-beat advantage
Qualified to the semifinals first-round playoff

====== Match-up results ======
| | Round 1 | | | | | | Round 2 | | | | | |
| Team ╲ Game | 1 | 2 | 3 | 4 | 5 | 6 | 7 | 8 | 9 | 10 | 11 | 12 |
|---|---|---|---|---|---|---|---|---|---|---|---|---|
| AdU | | | | | | | | | | | | |
| AdMU | | | | | | | | | | | | |
| DLSU | | | | | | | | | | | | |
| NU | | | | | | | | | | | | |
| UE | | | | | | | | | | | | |
| UP | | | | | | | | | | | | |
| UST | | | | | | | | | | | | |

= Win; = Loss

===== Playoffs =====
Stepladder round 1 (One-game playoff)
3 | UST | 3
4 | Ateneo | ?

Stepladder round 2 (No. 2 has twice-to-beat advantage)
2 | UE | 3
3 | UST | ?

Finals (No. 1 seed has thrice-to-beat advantage)
1 | NU | ? | ? | ?
2 | UE | 3 | 3 | 3

===== Awards =====
- Most Valuable Player: Jomari Ingeniero (UE Junior Red Warriors)
- Rookie of the Year: Alvin Credo (UST Tiger Cubs)

== Tennis ==
The UAAP Tennis tournament began on January 11, 2014 at the Olivarez College Tennis Courts in Parañaque. The tournament host is National University.

=== Men's tournament ===
==== Elimination round ====
| Pos | Team | Pld | W | L | PCT | GB | Qualification |
|---|---|---|---|---|---|---|---|
| 1 | NU Bulldogs | 10 | 10 | 0 | 1.000 | — | Twice-to-beat in the Finals |
| 2 | UP Fighting Maroons | 10 | 8 | 2 | .800 | 2 | Twice-to-win in the Finals |
| 3 | De La Salle Green Archers | 10 | 5 | 5 | .500 | 5 | |
| 4 | UST Growling Tigers | 10 | 5 | 5 | .500 | 5 | |
| 5 | Ateneo Blue Eagles | 10 | 2 | 8 | .200 | 8 | |
| 6 | UE Red Warriors | 10 | 0 | 10 | .000 | 10 | |

Rules for classification: 1) winning percentage; 2) if tied for #2 or #4, one-game playoff; 3) head-to-head record; 4) head-to-head point differential; 5) overall point differential

==== Awards ====
- Most Valuable Player: Fritz Chris Verdad (NU Bulldogs)
- Rookie of the Year: Jurence Zosimo Mendoza (UP Fighting Maroons)

=== Women's tournament ===
==== Elimination round ====
| Pos | Team | Pld | W | L | PCT | GB | Qualification |
|---|---|---|---|---|---|---|---|
| 1 | NU Lady Bulldogs | 8 | 7 | 1 | .875 | — | Qualified to the Finals |
| 2 | De La Salle Lady Archers | 8 | 7 | 1 | .875 | — | Qualified to the Finals |
| 3 | UST Growling Tigresses | 8 | 4 | 4 | .500 | 3 | |
| 4 | UP Lady Maroons | 8 | 2 | 6 | .250 | 5 | |
| 5 | Ateneo Lady Eagles | 8 | 0 | 8 | .000 | 7 | |

Rules for classification: 1) winning percentage; 2) if tied for #2 or #4, one-game playoff; 3) head-to-head record; 4) head-to-head point differential; 5) overall point differential

==== Awards ====
- Most Valuable Player: Anna Christine Patrimonio (Ateneo Lady Eagles)
- Rookie of the Year:

== Judo ==
The UAAP Judo Championships ran from September 28–29, 2013 at the Blue Eagle Gym of the Ateneo de Manila University in Katipunan Ave., Loyola Heights, Quezon City. The tournament host is Ateneo de Manila University.

=== Seniors division ===
==== Men's tournament ====
===== Team standings =====
| Rank | Team | Medals | | | | Points |
|---|---|---|---|---|---|---|
| Rank | Team | 1st place, gold medalist(s) | 2nd place, silver medalist(s) | 3rd place, bronze medalist(s) | Total | Points |
| 1st place, gold medalist(s) | Ateneo | 2 | 3 | 6 | 11 | 47 |
| 2nd place, silver medalist(s) | UP | 2 | 1 | 5 | 8 | 35 |
| 3rd place, bronze medalist(s) | La Salle | 2 | 2 | 1 | 5 | 32 |
| 4 | UST | 1 | 1 | 2 | 4 | 19 |
| 5 | UE | 0 | 0 | 0 | 0 | 0 |
| 5 | Adamson | 0 | 0 | 0 | 0 | 0 |

===== Awards =====
- Most Valuable Player: Matthew Simon Jao (Ateneo Blue Eagles)
- Rookie of the Year: Ralph Christian Sapi (Ateneo Blue Eagles)

==== Women's tournament ====
===== Team standings =====
| Rank | Team | Medals | | | | Points |
|---|---|---|---|---|---|---|
| Rank | Team | 1st place, gold medalist(s) | 2nd place, silver medalist(s) | 3rd place, bronze medalist(s) | Total | Points |
| 1st place, gold medalist(s) | La Salle | 3 | 2 | 1 | 6 | 42 |
| 2nd place, silver medalist(s) | Ateneo | 2 | 1 | 2 | 5 | 29 |
| 3rd place, bronze medalist(s) | UE | 2 | 1 | 2 | 5 | 29 |
| 4 | UST | 0 | 3 | 5 | 8 | 25 |
| 5 | UP | 0 | 0 | 4 | 4 | 8 |

- To break Ateneo and UE's tie, the number of Ippons were counted.

===== Awards =====
- Most Valuable Player: Ridgel Nicole More (De La Salle Lady Archers)
- Rookie of the Year: Lorelei Tolentino (UST Growling Tigresses)

=== Juniors' division ===
==== Boys' tournament ====
===== Team standings =====
| Rank | Team | Medals | | | | Points |
|---|---|---|---|---|---|---|
| Rank | Team | 1st place, gold medalist(s) | 2nd place, silver medalist(s) | 3rd place, bronze medalist(s) | Total | Points |
| 1st place, gold medalist(s) | Ateneo | 7 | 3 | 3 | 13 | 91 |
| 2nd place, silver medalist(s) | La Salle | 0 | 3 | 2 | 5 | 19 |
| 3rd place, bronze medalist(s) | UST | 0 | 1 | 5 | 6 | 15 |
| 4 | UE | 0 | 0 | 3 | 3 | 6 |

===== Awards =====
- Most Valuable Player: Rean Gonzales (Ateneo Blue Eaglets)
- Rookie of the Year: Rean Gonzales (Ateneo Blue Eaglets)

== Taekwondo ==
The UAAP Season 76 Taekwondo tournament began on September 4, 2013 at the Filoil Flying V Arena in San Juan City, Metro Manila. The tournament host is Far Eastern University.

=== Seniors division ===
==== Men's tournament ====
===== Team standings =====
| Rank | Team | W | L | PCT |
|---|---|---|---|---|
| 1 | La Salle Green Jins | 6 | 0 | 1.000 |
| 2 | UST Growling Tigers | 5 | 1 | 0.833 |
| 3 | UP Fighting Maroons | 4 | 2 | 0.667 |
| 4 | UE Red Warriors | 2 | 4 | 0.333 |
| 5 | FEU Tamaraws | 2 | 4 | 0.333 |
| 6 | Ateneo Blue Jins | 2 | 4 | 0.333 |
| 7 | NU Bulldogs | 0 | 6 | 0.000 |

Season host in **boldface**.

===== Awards =====
- Most Valuable Player: Kevin Louis Sia (De La Salle Green Archers)
- Rookie of the Year: Juan Miguel Ramos (UST Growling Tigers)

==== Women's tournament ====
===== Team standings =====
| Rank | Team | W | L | PCT |
|---|---|---|---|---|
| 1 | UST Growling Tigresses | 6 | 0 | 1.000 |
| 2 | UP Lady Maroons | 5 | 1 | 0.833 |
| 3 | De La Salle Lady Archers | 4 | 2 | 0.667 |
| 4 | FEU Lady Tamaraws | 3 | 3 | 0.500 |
| 5 | Ateneo Lady Eagles | 2 | 4 | 0.333 |
| 6 | NU Lady Bulldogs | 1 | 5 | 0.167 |
| 7 | UE Lady Warriors | 0 | 6 | 0.000 |

Season host in **boldface**.

===== Awards =====
- Most Valuable Player: Nicole Abigail Cham (UST Growling Tigresses)
- Rookie of the Year: Wee Dee Valenzuela (UST Growling Tigresses)

=== Juniors' division ===
==== Boys' tournament ====
===== Team standings =====
| Rank | Team | W | L | PCT |
|---|---|---|---|---|
| 1 | UE Junior Red Warriors | 4 | 0 | 1.000 |
| 2 | FEU–D Baby Tamaraws | 3 | 1 | 0.750 |
| 3 | UST Tiger Cubs | 2 | 2 | 0.500 |
| 4 | Zobel Junior Archers | 1 | 3 | 0.250 |
| 5 | Ateneo Blue Eaglets | 0 | 4 | 0.000 |

Season host in boldface.

===== Awards =====
- Most Valuable Player: King Philip Pineda (UE Junior Red Warriors)
- Rookie of the Year: Clifferson Scott Romuar (UE Junior Red Warriors)

== Poomsae ==
The inaugural UAAP Poomsae tournament as a regular sport was held on September 13, 2013, at the Filoil Flying V Arena in San Juan City, Metro Manila. Poomsae was a demonstration sport starting with Season 74 (2011–12).

=== Medal table ===
| Rank | Team | Gold | Silver | Bronze | Total |
|---|---|---|---|---|---|
| 1st place, gold medalist(s) | UST Growling Tigers | 5 | 0 | 0 | 5 |
| 2nd place, silver medalist(s) | UP Fighting Maroons | 0 | 3 | 0 | 3 |
| 3rd place, bronze medalist(s) | Ateneo Blue Eagles | 0 | 1 | 3 | 4 |
| 4 | FEU Tamaraws | 0 | 1 | 1 | 2 |
| 5 | De La Salle Green Archers | 0 | 0 | 1 | 1 |
| 6 | NU Bulldogs | 0 | 0 | 0 | 0 |
| 7 | UE Red Warriors | 0 | 0 | 0 | 0 |

=== Medal Winners ===
| Event | Gold | Silver | Bronze |
|---|---|---|---|
| Men's Individual | Vidal Marvin Gabriel | Dustin Jacob Mella | Raymund Ed Bermejo |
| Women's Individual | Shaneen Ched Sia | France Pauline Alarilla | Juvenile Faye Crisostomo |
| Mixed Pair | Yuei Hannah Murillo; Rodolfo Reyes, Jr. | Anthony Ray Matias; Cyrmyn Perlas | Francis Aaron Agojo; France Pauline Alarilla |
| Men's Team | Ronnel Avenido; Vidal Marvin Gabriel; Rodolfo Reyes, Jr. | Jun Jeffri Lidasan; Anthony Ray Matias; Dustin Jacob Mella | Francis Aaron Agojo; Raymund Ed Bermejo; Justin de Leon |
| Women's Team | Jan Airish Cenizal; Raisa Libiran; Jocellyn Ninoba | Winlou Gean dela Cerna; Ann Margareth Diaz; Leonarda Nicole Leandrito | Roshelle Cris Corcino; Kristi Anrose Hernandez; Patricia Mae Sembrano |

== Swimming ==
The UAAP swimming championships was held on September 19–22, 2013 at the Trace Aquatics Centre in Los Baños, Laguna. The men's and women's divisions are now six member-school tournaments with the participation of Adamson starting this season. After the four-day tournament, there was a total of 34 new UAAP records that were established: 7 in the men's division, 12 in women's, 10 in boys', and 5 in girls'.

Ranking is determined by a point system, similar to that of the overall championship. The points given are based on the swimmer's/team's finish in the finals of an event, which include only the top eight finishers from the preliminaries. The gold medalist(s) receive 15 points, silver gets 12, bronze has 10. The following points: 8, 6, 4, 2 and 1 are given to the rest of the participating swimmers/teams according to their order of finish.

=== Seniors division ===
==== Men's tournament ====
===== Team standings =====
| Rank | Team | Medals | | | | Points |
|---|---|---|---|---|---|---|
| Rank | Team | 1st place, gold medalist(s) | 2nd place, silver medalist(s) | 3rd place, bronze medalist(s) | Total | Points |
| 1st place, gold medalist(s) | UP | 9 | 5 | 8 | 22 | 452 |
| 2nd place, silver medalist(s) | La Salle | 6 | 6 | 5 | 17 | 301 |
| 3rd place, bronze medalist(s) | Ateneo | 6 | 6 | 6 | 18 | 283 |
| 4 | UST | 1 | 5 | 3 | 9 | 175 |
| 5 | UE | 0 | 0 | 0 | 0 | 18 |
| 6 | Adamson | 0 | 0 | 0 | 0 | 0 |

===== Awards =====
- Most Valuable Player: Johansen Benedict Aguilar (De La Salle Green Archers)
- Rookie of the Year: Christen Mercado (UP Fighting Maroons)

==== Women's tournament ====
===== Team standings =====
| Rank | Team | Medals | | | | Points |
|---|---|---|---|---|---|---|
| Rank | Team | 1st place, gold medalist(s) | 2nd place, silver medalist(s) | 3rd place, bronze medalist(s) | Total | Points |
| 1st place, gold medalist(s) | UP | 13 | 14 | 6 | 33 | 587 |
| 2nd place, silver medalist(s) | Ateneo | 8 | 6 | 7 | 21 | 387 |
| 3rd place, bronze medalist(s) | La Salle | 0 | 1 | 8 | 9 | 115 |
| 4 | UE | 0 | 0 | 0 | 0 | 2 |
| 5 | Adamson | 0 | 0 | 0 | 0 | 0 |
| — | UST | Withdrew | | | | |

===== Awards =====
- Most Valuable Player: Anna Celina Gonzalez (Ateneo Lady Eagles)
- Rookie of the Year: Thea Marie Caluma (Ateneo Lady Eagles)

| Pos. | Pts. |
|---|---|
| 1st | 15 |
| 2nd | 12 |
| 3rd | 10 |
| 4th | 8 |
| 5th | 6 |
| 6th | 4 |
| 7th | 2 |
| 8th | 1 |

=== Juniors division ===
==== Boys' tournament ====
===== Team standings =====
| Rank | Team | Medals | | | | Points |
|---|---|---|---|---|---|---|
| Rank | Team | 1st place, gold medalist(s) | 2nd place, silver medalist(s) | 3rd place, bronze medalist(s) | Total | Points |
| 1st place, gold medalist(s) | Ateneo | 15 | 9 | 7 | 31 | 567 |
| 2nd place, silver medalist(s) | La Salle | - | - | - | - | 239 |
| 3rd place, bronze medalist(s) | UST | - | - | - | - | 204 |
| 4 | UE | - | - | - | - | 138 |
| 5 | UP | - | - | - | - | 93 |

===== Awards =====
- Most Valuable Player: Gerard Christoffe Reyes (Ateneo Blue Eaglets)
- Rookie of the Year: Joshua Taleon (Ateneo Blue Eaglets)

==== Girls' tournament ====
===== Team standings =====
| Rank | Team | Medals | | | | Points |
|---|---|---|---|---|---|---|
| Rank | Team | 1st place, gold medalist(s) | 2nd place, silver medalist(s) | 3rd place, bronze medalist(s) | Total | Points |
| 1st place, gold medalist(s) | UE | - | - | - | - | 403 |
| 2nd place, silver medalist(s) | UST | - | - | - | - | 371 |
| 3rd place, bronze medalist(s) | DLSZ | - | - | - | - | 197 |
| 4 | UPIS | - | - | - | - | 173 |

===== Awards =====
- Most Valuable Player: Christine Jhoy Mendoza (UE Junior Lady Warriors)
- Rookie of the Year: Ronalyn Joyce Lalimo (UST Junior Tigresses)

== Cheerdance ==
The UAAP Cheerdance Competition was held on September 15, 2013 at the SM Mall of Asia Arena. The event host was University of Santo Tomas. Cheerdance competition is an exhibition event. Points for the general championship are not awarded to the participants.

=== Team standings ===
| Rank | Team | Order | Tumbling | Stunts | Tosses | Pyramids | Dance | Penalties | Points | Percentage |
|---|---|---|---|---|---|---|---|---|---|---|
| 1st place, gold medalist(s) | NU Pep Squad | 5th | 85.00 | 74.00 | 90.00 | 88.50 | 360.00 | –1 | 696.5 | 87.06% |
| 2nd place, silver medalist(s) | UP Pep Squad | 2nd | 77.00 | 69.50 | 80.50 | 79.00 | 332.50 | –18 | 620.5 | 77.56% |
| 3rd place, bronze medalist(s) | DLSU Animo Squad | 4th | 69.00 | 65.00 | 72.50 | 76.00 | 315.00 | –1 | 596.5 | 74.56% |
| 4 | FEU Cheering Squad | 1st | 72.00 | 66.00 | 75.00 | 80.00 | 297.50 | –1 | 589.5 | 73.69% |
| 5 | Adamson Pep Squad | 8th | 61.50 | 62.00 | 79.00 | 64.00 | 305.00 | –12 | 559.5 | 69.94% |
| 6 | UE Pep Squad | 3rd | 65.50 | 61.50 | 66.50 | 66.00 | 299.50 | 0 | 559.0 | 69.88% |
| 7 | UST Salinggawi Dance Troupe | 6th | 65.50 | 64.50 | 73.50 | 58.50 | 325.00 | –41 | 546.0 | 68.25% |
| 8 | Ateneo Blue Babble Battalion | 7th | 59.50 | 58.50 | 56.50 | 63.00 | 286.50 | –10 | 514.0 | 64.25% |

Order - refers to order of performance

- Stunner award: Ana De Leon - DLSU Animo Squad

=== Group stunts competition ===
| Champion | 2nd place | 3rd place |
|---|---|---|
| NU | FEU | UST |

== General championship summary ==
The general champion is determined by a point system. The system gives 15 points to the champion team of a UAAP event, 12 to the runner-up, and 10 to the third placer. The following points: 8, 6, 4, 2 and 1 are given to the rest of the participating teams according to their order of finish.

=== Medals table ===
==== Seniors' division ====
| Rank | Team | Gold | Silver | Bronze | Total |
|---|---|---|---|---|---|
| 1 | De La Salle University | 6 | 7 | 5 | 18 |
| 2 | Ateneo de Manila University | 5 | 3 | 5 | 13 |
| 3 | Far Eastern University | 5 | 1 | 4 | 10 |
| 4 | National University | 4 | 3 | 2 | 9 |
| 5 | University of the Philippines Diliman | 3 | 6 | 3 | 12 |
| 6 | University of Santo Tomas | 2 | 8 | 6 | 16 |
| 7 | Adamson University* | 2 | 1 | 1 | 4 |
| 8 | University of the East | 2 | 0 | 3 | 5 |
| Totals (8 entries) | | 29 | 29 | 29 | 87 |

* Host nation (Season host); General champions
Notes: Results are final.

==== Juniors' division ====
| Rank | Team | Gold | Silver | Bronze | Total |
|---|---|---|---|---|---|
| 1 | University of the East | 7 | 0 | 0 | 7 |
| 2 | Ateneo de Manila University | 2 | 5 | 1 | 8 |
| 3 | National University | 2 | 3 | 0 | 5 |
| 4 | University of Santo Tomas | 1 | 2 | 6 | 9 |
| 5 | De La Salle Zobel | 1 | 2 | 3 | 6 |
| 6 | Far Eastern University–Diliman | 1 | 2 | 2 | 5 |
| 7 | Adamson University* | 0 | 0 | 1 | 1 |
| 7 | UP Integrated School | 0 | 0 | 1 | 1 |
| Totals (8 entries) | | 14 | 14 | 14 | 42 |

* Host nation (Season host); General champions
Notes: Results are final.

=== General championship tally ===
==== Seniors' division ====
| | | Basketball | | Volleyball (indoor) | | Volleyball (beach) | | Swimming | | Chess | | Tennis | | Table tennis | | Badminton | | Taekwondo | | | Judo | | Baseball | Softball | Football | | Athletics | | Fencing | | Total | | | |
| Rank | Team | M | W | M | W | M | W | M | W | M | W | M | W | M | W | M | W | M | W | C | M | W | M | W | M | W | M | W | M | W | M | W | C | Overall |
|---|---|---|---|---|---|---|---|---|---|---|---|---|---|---|---|---|---|---|---|---|---|---|---|---|---|---|---|---|---|---|---|---|---|---|
| 1 | La Salle | 15 | 15 | 6 | 12 | 1 | 8 | 12 | 10 | 10 | 15 | 10 | 12 | 15 | 12 | 6 | 12 | 15 | 10 | 6 | 10 | 15 | 12 | 4 | 8 | 6 | 8 | 6 | 12 | 6 | 140 | 143 | 6 | 289 |
| 2 | UST | 12 | 10 | 4 | 4 | 12 | 12 | 8 | 4 | 8 | 8 | 8 | 10 | 8 | 10 | 10 | 6 | 12 | 15 | 15 | 8 | 8 | 8 | 10 | 10 | 12 | 12 | 12 | 6 | 12 | 126 | 133 | 15 | 274 |
| 3 | UP | 1 | 4 | 2 | 2 | 8 | 1 | 15 | 15 | 4 | 12 | 12 | 8 | 4 | 15 | 8 | 10 | 10 | 12 | 12 | 12 | 6 | 6 | 6 | 12 | 8 | 10 | 8 | 8 | 4 | 112 | 111 | 12 | 235 |
| 4 | Ateneo | 6 | 1 | 12 | 15 | 4 | 10 | 10 | 12 | 2 | 1 | 6 | 6 | 1 | 4 | 15 | 15 | 4 | 6 | 10 | 15 | 12 | 15 | 2 | 2 | 10 | 6 | 4 | 10 | 8 | 108 | 106 | 10 | 224 |
| 5 | FEU | 10 | 6 | 10 | 6 | 6 | 2 | — | — | 15 | 10 | — | — | 12 | 8 | 4 | 8 | 6 | 8 | 8 | — | — | — | — | 15 | 15 | 15 | 15 | 4 | 10 | 97 | 88 | 8 | 193 |
| 6 | NU | 8 | 12 | 15 | 10 | 15 | 6 | — | — | 6 | 6 | 15 | 15 | 6 | 6 | 12 | 1 | 2 | 4 | 2 | — | — | 10 | 12 | 4 | — | — | — | 2 | — | 95 | 72 | 2 | 169 |
| 7 | UE | 4 | 2 | 1 | 1 | 2 | 4 | 6 | 8 | 1 | 2 | 4 | — | 10 | — | 1 | 4 | 8 | 2 | 4 | 5 | 10 | — | 8 | 6 | — | 4 | 10 | 15 | 15 | 67 | 66 | 4 | 137 |
| 8 | Adamson (H) | 2 | 8 | 8 | 8 | 10 | 15 | 4 | 6 | 12 | 4 | — | — | 2 | 2 | 2 | 2 | — | — | — | 5 | 4 | 4 | 15 | — | — | 2 | 2 | — | — | 51 | 66 | 0 | 117 |

(H) Season host; = Champion; = Runner-up; = Third place; — = No team.
Notes: Results are final.

==== Juniors' division ====
| | | Basketball | Volleyball (indoor) | | Swimming | | Chess | Table tennis | Taekwondo | Judo | Baseball | Football | Athletics | Fencing | | Total | | | | |
| Rank | Team | B | B | G | B | G | C | B | B | B | B | B | B | B | G | B | G | C | K | Overall |
|---|---|---|---|---|---|---|---|---|---|---|---|---|---|---|---|---|---|---|---|---|
| 1 | UE | 6 | 15 | 8 | 8 | 15 | 4 | 15 | 15 | 8 | — | — | 15 | 15 | 15 | 97 | 38 | 4 | 0 | 139 |
| 2 | UST | 4 | 8 | 15 | 10 | 12 | 8 | 10 | 10 | 10 | 10 | 8 | 4 | 10 | 12 | 84 | 39 | 8 | 0 | 131 |
| 3 | Ateneo | 12 | 10 | — | 15 | — | 6 | 8 | 6 | 15 | 12 | 12 | 12 | 12 | — | 114 | 0 | 6 | 0 | 120 |
| 4 | DLSZ | 8 | 6 | 10 | 12 | 10 | 2 | 4 | 8 | 12 | 15 | 10 | 6 | 4 | 8 | 85 | 28 | 2 | 0 | 115 |
| 5 | FEU–D | 10 | — | — | — | — | 12 | — | 12 | — | — | 15 | — | 8 | 10 | 45 | 10 | 12 | 0 | 67 |
| 6 | NU | 15 | 12 | 12 | — | — | 15 | 12 | — | — | — | — | — | — | — | 39 | 12 | 15 | 0 | 66 |
| 7 | UPIS | 2 | 4 | 4 | 6 | 8 | — | 2 | — | — | — | — | 10 | 4 | — | 28 | 12 | 0 | 0 | 40 |
| 8 | Adamson (H) | 1 | — | 6 | — | — | 10 | 6 | — | — | — | — | 8 | — | — | 15 | 6 | 10 | 0 | 31 |

(H) Season host; = Champion; = Runner-up; = Third place; — = No team.
Notes: Results are final.

== See also ==
- NCAA Season 89
