= Junior (name) =

Junior is a given name, nickname, and surname often used by people who are the second in their family with the same name (for more information, see generational titles). It may refer to:

== People with the given name ==
- Júnior (Filipino singer) (1943–2014), Filipino singer
- Junior Aliberti (born 1984), Uruguayan footballer
- Junior Bent (born 1970), English former footballer
- Junior Bergen (born 2002), American football player
- Junior Castillo (born 1986), Dominican boxer
- Júnior César (born 1982), Brazilian footballer
- Júnior Díaz (born 1983), Costa Rican footballer
- Junior D. Edwards (1926–1951), United States Army soldier during the Korean War, recipient of the Medal of Honor
- Junior Eldstål (born 1991), Malaysian-Swedish footballer
- Junior Etou (born 1994), Congolese basketball player for Hapoel Be'er Sheva of the Israeli Basketball Premier League
- Júnior Felício Marques (born 1987), Brazilian footballer
- Junior Félix (born 1967), Dominican baseball player
- Junior Fernandes (born 1988), Chilean footballer
- Junior Flemmings (born 1996), Jamaican footballer
- Junior Giscombe (born 1957), UK-born R&B singer
- Júnior Izaguirre (born 1979), Honduran footballer
- Junior Jones (born 1970), American former professional boxer
- Junior Kabananga (born 1989), Congolese footballer
- Junior Lake (born 1990), Dominican baseball player
- Junior Lewis (born 1973), English former footballer
- Júnior Lopes (born 1973), Brazilian football manager
- Junior Marvin (born 1949), Jamaican-born guitarist and singer
- Junior Mendes (born 1976), English-born Montserratian footballer
- Junior Moors (born 1986), New Zealand rugby league player
- Júnior Morales (born 1978), Honduran footballer
- Junior Morias (born 1995), Jamaican footballer
- Junior Murray (born 1968), West Indian cricketer
- Junior Murvin (c. 1946–2013), Jamaican reggae musician
- Junior Nuñez (born 1989), Peruvian footballer
- Junior Obagbemiro (born 1985), Nigerian footballer
- Junior Paulo (born 1983), New Zealand rugby league player
- Junior Paulo (born 1993), New Zealand-born Australian Rugby League player
- Junior Pelesasa (born 1980), Australian rugby union footballer
- Junior Poluleuligaga (born 1981), Samoan rugby player
- Junior Roqica (born 1991), Australian rugby league player
- Junior Ross (born 1986), Peruvian footballer
- Junior Sánchez (born 1989), Venezuelan weightlifter
- Junior Sandoval (born 1990), Honduran footballer
- Junior dos Santos (born 1984), Brazilian mixed martial artist, former UFC heavyweight champion
- Junior Sa'u (born 1987), New Zealand rugby league footballer
- Junior Sherrill (born 2005), American football player
- Junior Sifa (born 1983), American international rugby union player
- Junior Simpson, British stand-up comedian
- Junior Sornoza (born 1994), Ecuadorian footballer
- Junior Spivey (born 1975), American baseball player
- Junior Stanislas (born 1989), English footballer
- Junior Strous (born 1986), Dutch racing driver
- Junior Tafuna (born 2001), American football player
- Júnior Urso (born 1989), Brazilian footballer
- Junior Viza (born 1985), Peruvian footballer
- Junior Walker (1931–1995), American musician
- Junior Witter (born 1974), English boxer

== People with the nickname ==
- Júnior (footballer, born 1973) (Jenílson Ângelo de Souza), Brazilian footballer
- Júnior Baiano (Raimundo Ferreira Ramos Jr., born 1970), Brazilian footballer
- Junior Bridgeman (Ulysses Lee Bridgeman, 1953–2025), American basketball player and businessman
- Dale Earnhardt Jr. (born 1974), American race car driver
- Jim Gilliam (1928–1978), American Major League Baseball and Negro league player and coach
- Junior Giscombe (born 1957), British singer-songwriter
- Ken Griffey Jr. (born 1969), American Major League Baseball Hall-of-Fame player
- Antonio Morales Barreto (1943–2014), Filipino-Spanish singer and actor
- Junior Johnson (Robert Glenn Johnson Jr.; 1931–2019), American auto racing driver and team owner
- Junior Malanda (Bernard Malanda-Adje) (1994–2015), Belgian footballer
- Júnior Negrão (Gleidionor Figueiredo Pinto Júnior, born 1986), Brazilian footballer
- Junior Seau (Tiaina Baul Seau Jr., 1969–2012), American National Football League player
- Junior Smith (born 1973), American football player
- Jack Stephens (basketball) (1933–2011), American basketball player

== People with the surname ==
- Cristiano Júnior (1979–2004), Brazilian footballer
- Dossa Júnior, (born 1986), Cypriot footballer
- E. J. Junior (born 1959), American football player
- Gregory Junior (born 1999), American football player
- José Júnior (born 1976), Brazilian footballer
- Leovegildo Lins da Gama Júnior (born 1954), Brazilian footballer
- Marvin Junior (1936–2013), American R&B singer, founding member of the vocal group The Dells
- Moacir Júnior (born 1967), Brazilian football manager
- Nicolau Júnior, Brazilian politician
- Pedro Júnior (born 1987), Brazilian footballer
- Vitor Júnior (born 1986), Brazilian footballer
- Vitor Gomes Pereira Júnior (born 1989), Brazilian footballer

== See also ==
- Junior (disambiguation)
