= Junior's Grill =

Restaurant in Atlanta, Georgia, United States

Coordinates: 33.772638°N 84.394515°W

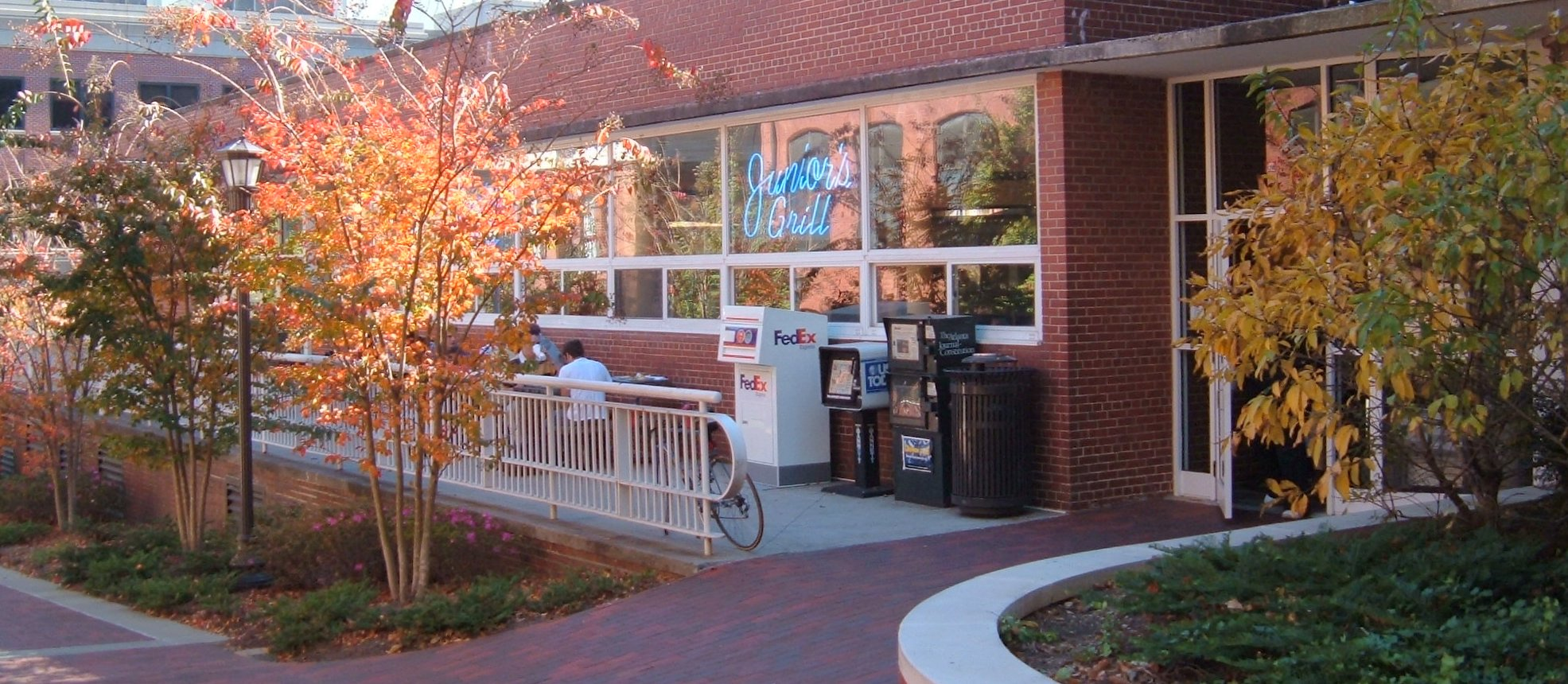
Junior's Grill, on the side of Tech Tower

Junior's Grill was a restaurant in Atlanta, Georgia, in the United States. It was located on the Georgia Tech campus in the Bradley Building near Tech Tower. It was a family business owned by Tommy Klemis. The restaurant served breakfast, lunch and dinner Monday through Thursday (breakfast and lunch only on Friday), and was famous among students for its French toast and battered chicken fingers. It closed on April 21, 2011, due to declining business.

== History ==
Junior's was founded by Wilbur Gold Jr. in 1948 as Pilgrim's and was originally located on North Avenue at Techwood Drive just south of campus. In 1958, the Georgia Board of Regents made plans to redevelop the property where Pilgrim's was located sometime in the future, and instead of accepting a year-to-year lease, Gold sold the business to James Klemis and John Chaknis, who changed the restaurant's name to Junior's Grill. Junior's remained in its original location until 1967, when the Board of Regents exercised its option to redevelop. The restaurant was relocated down the street to what had formerly been a barbershop, across from Smith Dormitory. The new location was much smaller than the original, and in 1987, Junior's expanded into the Engineer's Bookstore's former location next door. Soon after, the Georgia Tech Foundation purchased the property in preparation for the possibility that Atlanta would be an Olympic Games host city and gave Junior's a five-year lease. Demolition and construction for the 1996 Summer Olympics forced the restaurant to close in October 1993. Alumni, students and staff had petitioned to save Junior's and have the school find new premises for it. Renovations of the Bradley Building began in November 1993, and Junior's re-opened in that location in February 1994. Junior's closed indefinitely at 2:30pm on Thursday April 21, 2011.

== Culture ==
The restaurant's interior, c. 1972

The Georgia Tech student newspaper, The Technique, proclaimed that one of the 99 things every Tech student should do before they graduate is, "Eat at Junior's (and wonder why Tommy isn't in charge of all campus dining)". "Tommy" in this quote refers to James Klemis' son Tommy, who succeeded him as owner of the business. Some of the most popular items were the chicken fingers and burgers in "baskets," which came with a choice of side (usually French fries) and a soft drink. In addition, there was a traditional hot line that served breakfast and lunch, as well as an assortment of grill items that could be ordered à la carte. The restaurant housed a collection of historical items and memorabilia related to Georgia Tech, including historical photographs of the campus, portraits of prominent alumni and visitors, and a section of the goalpost from the school's 1990 National Championship victory at the Citrus Bowl.

== Legacy ==
Klemis Kitchen serves as a food pantry for students with dietary needs and financial concerns that limit their access to proper nourishment. The Klemis Kitchen Initiative started as an idea from several students who had known there was a gap in the fulfillment of the dietary needs of students on the Georgia Tech campus. As their peers they decided to take action and help prevent hunger for Tech students. Tommy Klemis, during his time on campus, often took care of the needs of these students. The Klemis Kitchen Initiative was created to fill the void that was created after Junior's Grill closed. Naming the project after Klemis honors both the history and legacy of Junior's Grill. "I can't think of a better legacy to leave for our future Tech students than one that actively provides funds to feed those in need," he said. "It honors all the employees of Junior's, many of whom were students."
