= Junior Lake (Vancouver Island) =

- Location within Vancouver Island
- Location: Vancouver Island, British Columbia
- Coordinates: 49°15′00″N 124°41′00″W
- Lake type: Natural lake
- Basin countries: Canada

Junior Lake is a lake located on Vancouver Island north of Great Central Lake, north east of Oshinow Lake.

== See also ==
- List of lakes of British Columbia
