= Junior's Fashion Week =

- Status: Active
- Genre: Fashion Week for Juniors
- Frequency: bi-annual
- Location: Metropolitan CIties
- Country: India
- Established: 2017
- Website: http://www.juniorsfashionweek.com

Juniors Fashion Week (JFW) is a bi-annual runway showcase, being conducted in Mumbai, Kolkata, Delhi, Pune, Chandigarh, Hyderabad, Chennai, Bengaluru, Kochi, Ludhiana, and Jaipur. JFW educates children about the latest fashion trends. Acclaimed by Time Magazine, JFW is Asia's number-one edutainment platform for kids. JFW also showcases various national and international brands on the runway and displays brand windows to the public audience.

== History ==
Junior's Fashion Week (JFW) was established in 2017 to provide a unique platform for children to showcase their creativity and style. The idea originated from observing a young child who displayed meticulous attention to detail while choosing the perfect upholstery for his room, which inspired the creation of an event dedicated to kids' fashion. Since its inception, JFW has organized 90+ fashion shows for kids, allowing them to explore different premium and luxury styles, outfits, and accessories. It has inspired young minds, fostered a love for creativity, and created a space where kids can shine and feel proud of their ideas. It has become a platform that empowers kids and instills a passion for fashion from an early age.

== The Selection Process at JFW ==
Junior's Fashion Week does not conduct auditions, because it focuses on nurturing participants' fashion knowledge, boosting their confidence, and promoting inclusivity. The selection process at Junior's Fashion Week (JFW) organizes workshops covering fashion aspects, runway training, and self-expression to equip participants with essential skills and enhance their self-esteem. The event reserves seats for physically challenged children ('Divyang') to provide equal opportunities and showcase their talent. JFW also engages in non-profit activities aligned with the Government of India's policies.

== Associated Brands ==
Junior's Fashion Week (JFW) collaborates with numerous Indian and international brands, offering strategic benefits such as brand optimism, recognition, loyalty, and sales assistance. This affiliation allows brands to connect with the target demographic and engage with primary purchasers. JFW has established partnerships with over 45+ brands, including Emporio Armani, Airtel, Allen Solly Junior, Angel & Rocket, Biba, Converse, DKNY, Flying Machine, Guess Kids, Hey Kid, Hugo Boss, Jordan, Karl Lagerfeld, Kenzo Kids, Kids Around, Levis, Little Marc Jacobs, LQ Milano, Marks & Spencer, Monnalisa, Nike, Paul Smith, Rookie, Scullers, Sonia Rykiel Paris, Stella McCartney, The Children's Place, U.S Polo Kids, and Whimsy Beauty. These associations introduce young participants to the inspiring world of international fashion and luxury apparel, creating a bridge between the brands and the ever-exciting fashion industry.

== Showcase Gallery ==
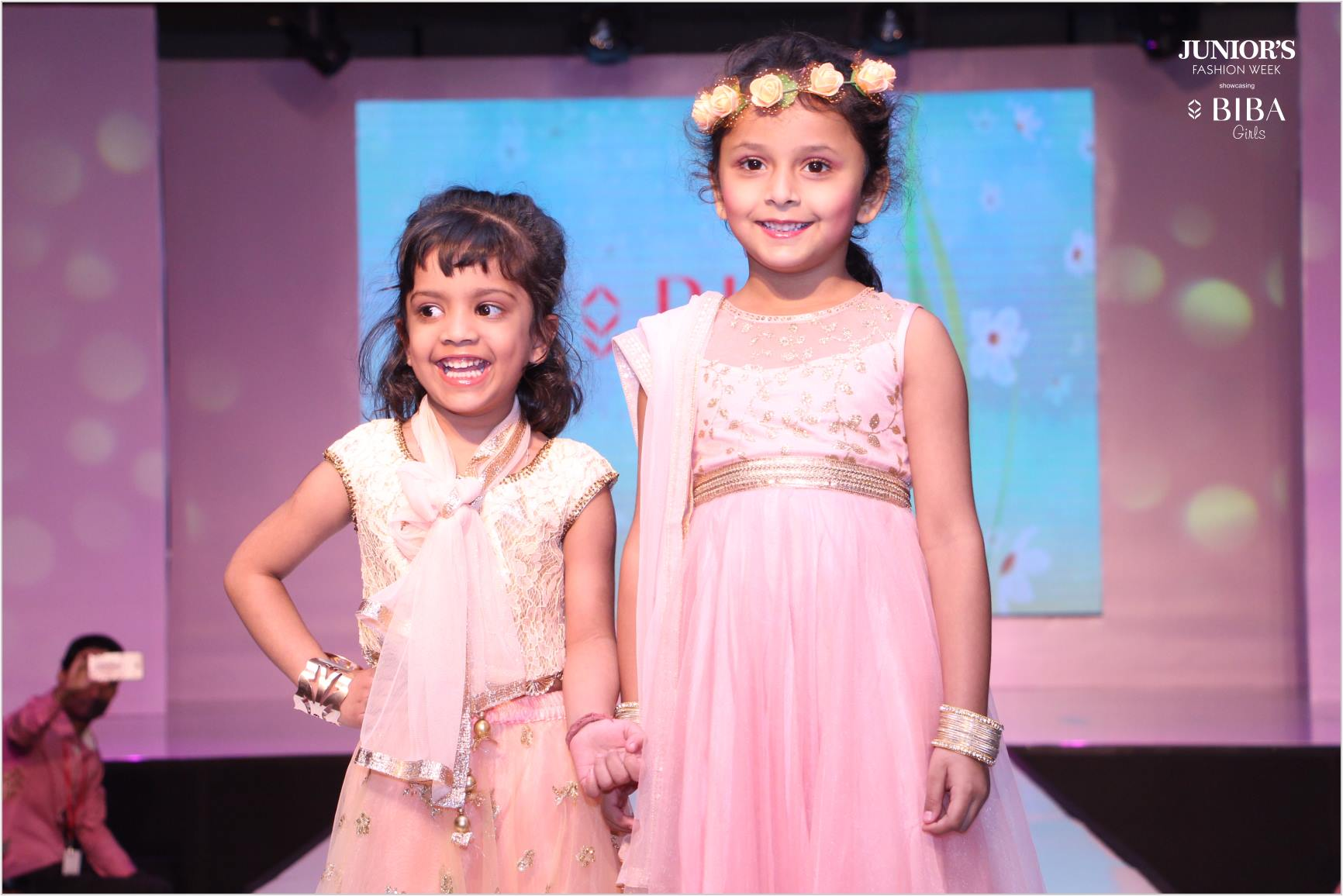
Girls showcasing Biba Girls at JFW

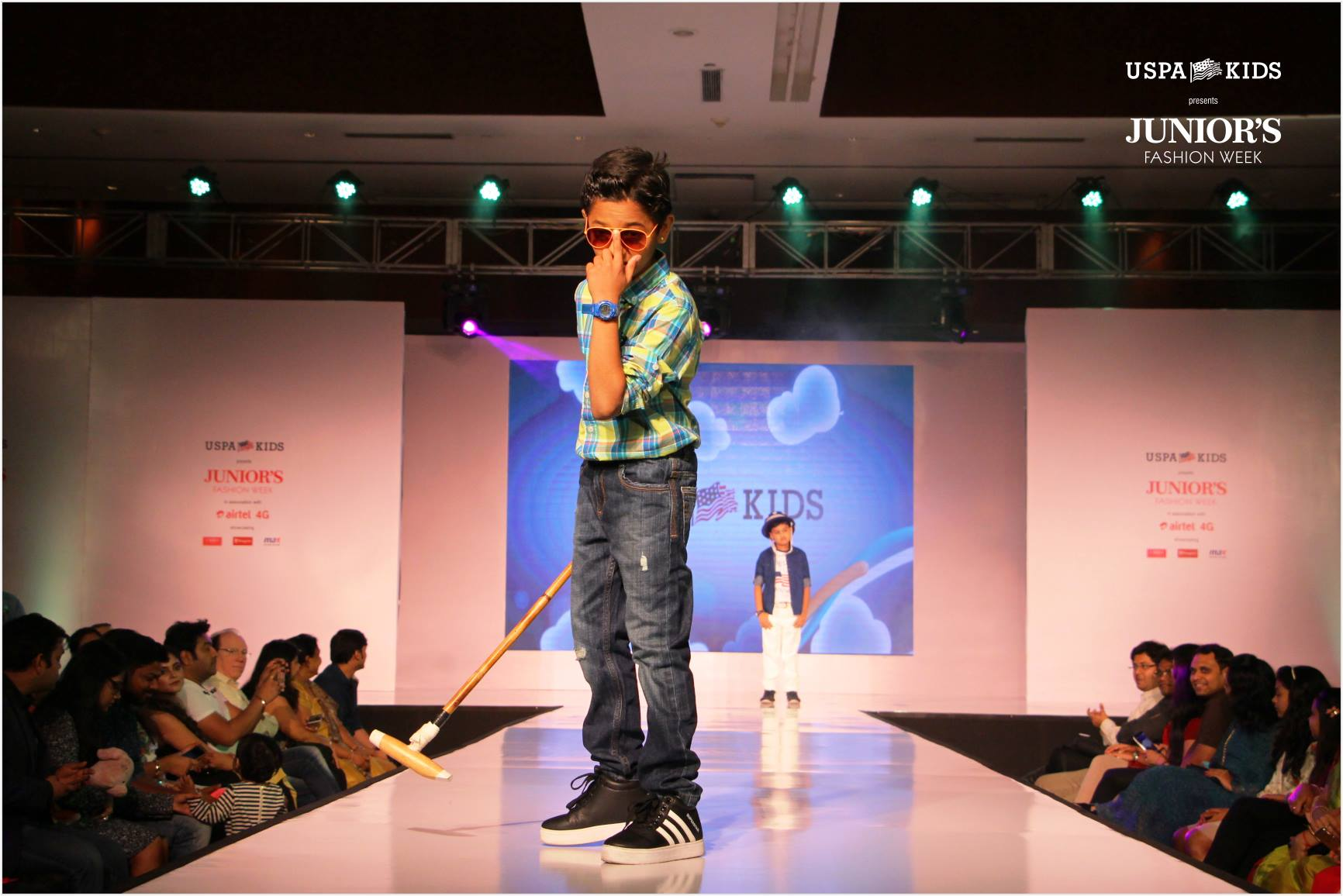
A Junior Model Showcasing US Polo Assn at Junior's Fashion Week

== See also ==
Armani, Fashion Week, London Fashion Week, List of fashion events, Runway (fashion)
