= Junior football =

Junior football may refer to:

- Association football played at the junior level, such as under the auspices of the Scottish Junior Football Association
- Association football played in the Scottish Junior Football League (1892-1947)
- Canadian football played at the junior level in Canada, such as in the Canadian Junior Football League
- Gaelic football played at junior national level, such as the All-Ireland Junior Football Championship
- Gaelic football played at junior local level, such as the East Kerry Junior Football Championship

== See also ==
- Senior football (disambiguation)
- Junior (footballer)
