= 2025 UST Growling Tigers basketball team =

College basketball team season

2025 UST Growling Tigers men's basketball

Record
- Elims rank: #3
- Final rank: #4
- 2025 record: 8–7 (8–6 elims)
- Head coach: Pido Jarencio (11th season)
- Assistant coaches: Juno Sauler; Peter Martin
- Captain: Nic Cabañero (5th season)

The 2025 UST Growling Tigers men's basketball team represented the University of Santo Tomas in the 88th season of the University Athletic Association of the Philippines. The men's basketball tournament for the academic year 2025–26 began on September 20, 2025, and the host school for the season was also UST.

The Tigers made it to the Final Four for the second straight year after finishing the elimination rounds at third place with an 8–6 record. They, however lost once again to the second-seeded UP Fighting Maroons in the semifinals after failing to overcome their twice-to-win disadvantage and missed getting on the podium after the top-seeded NU Bulldogs were eliminated by the De La Salle Green Archers to slide down and claim second runner-up honors instead.

They had an average winning margin of 11.4 points and an average losing margin of 5.0 points. They had a 20-point, 87–67 blowout win over UP at the start of the season, which broke their six-year losing streak against them. Two of their games went into overtime, with their first-round game against the Ateneo Blue Eagles going into three extra periods for a hard-fought win, and then losing by a single point against the Adamson Soaring Falcons in the second round.

Nic Cabañero made it to the Mythical team for the second straight year and once again become the league's scoring leader for the third time, after averaging 16.8 points per game in the eliminations. Nigerian center Collins Akowe was named Rookie of the Year. He was earlier chosen Player of the Week by the Collegiate Press Corps for the duration of September 20–28, while third-year forward Gelo Crisostomo got the citation during the week of October 8–12, 2025.

== Roster ==
UST Growling Tigers roster
Players
Coaches

Pos.	No.	Nat.	Name	Height	Year	High School
SG	1	(United States)	Leland Reuben Estacio	6'2" (1.88m)	4th	Franklin High School
PG	2	(Philippines)	Bevir Ivanne Calum	5'11" (1.8m)	3rd	St. Louis School–Don Bosco
PG	3	(United States)	Kyle Brandon Paranada	5'9" (1.75m)	4th	Montgomery High School
SF	8	(Philippines)	Hezekiah Charles Bucsit	6'3" (1.91m)	1st	University of Santo Tomas
SF	9	(Philippines)	Nicael Dominie Cabañero (C)	6'3" (1.91m)	5th	University of Santo Tomas
PF	10	(Philippines)	Mark Angelo Crisostomo	6'5" (1.96m)	3rd	Sta. Teresita National High School
PG	11	(Philippines)	Rence Keith Sean Padrigao	5'11" (1.8m)	4th	Ateneo de Manila
SF	12	(Philippines)	Glenn Isaac Danting	6'3" (1.91m)	2nd	University of the Assumption
PF	13	(Philippines)	Lorenzo Bangco	6'4" (1.93m)	1st	University of the East
SF	14	(Philippines)	Mark Allen Llemit	6'3" (1.91m)	3rd	University of Santo Tomas
PF	19	(Philippines)	Koji Ivan Buenaflor	6'6" (1.98m)	1st	University of Santo Tomas
SG	20	(Philippines)	Leonardo Amiel Acido	6'3" (1.91m)	2nd	University of Perpetual Help
PG	25	(Philippines)	Jiro Sevilla	5'10" (1.78m)	1st	De La Salle Santiago Zobel School
SG	26	(Philippines)	Carl Vincent Manding	6'2" (1.88m)	1st	University of Santo Tomas
C	28	(Nigeria)	Collins Akowe	6'10" (2.08m)	1st	National University Nazareth School
C	33	(Philippines)	Joachim Eddie Laure	6'5" (1.96m)	4th	National University Nazareth School

Head coach

- (Philippines) Alfredo Lorenzo Jarencio

Assistant coach(es)

- Marco Januz Sauler
- Victor Pedro Martin
- Alvin Grey
- John Paul Cuan
- Juben Ledesma
- Jeric Marco Fortuna
- Alfredo Jarencio II
- Carlos Joaquin Balingit
- Ian Joseph Herrera

Team manager

- Waiyip Chong
- Eric Ang

Legend

- (C) Team captain
- Injured

- [ Roster]

===Depth chart===

Pos.	Starting 5	Bench 1	Bench 2	Bench 3
C	Akowe	Laure
PF	Crisostomo	Buenaflor	Bangco
SF	Cabañero	Llemit	Bucsit
SG	Estacio	Acido	Danting	Manding
PG	Paranada	Padrigao	Calum	Sevilla

== Roster changes ==
"I would like to thank the UST community, coaches, management, teammates, and everyone who helped me through my journey. I chose to be in the Philippines with the goal of being a better person in life, a better player, and to gain more experience. It has always been my dream since I started playing basketball to compete at the highest level."

— Mo Tounkara

Three of the Growling Tigers' players from their 2024 roster have either graduated or used up their playing eligibility. Veterans Christian Manaytay and Miguel Pangilinan, together with Filipino American Chase Lane have all concluded their collegiate careers, with Manayatay declaring for the 2025 PBA rookie draft and getting selected in the first round. Three other players have also departed, including Mo Tounkara, their much-appreciated foreign student-athlete who decided to turn professional in his home region with the Basketball Africa League at the end of the school year. Manaytay averaged 7.3 points, 5.0 rebounds, 1.1 assists and 20.9 minutes in four years of playing college ball. Tounkara had a double-double average of 13.4 points and 10.1 rebounds in 28.5 minutes from his lone season with UST.

"I will give my honest truth, I don't know what to say. I'm speechless, (but) I'll just let the UAAP do their thing. They must have their reasons. I'm here to play basketball. The goal is not the MVP. If it happens, that's a bonus. The real goal is to win the championship. My thoughts on that (not becoming MVP)? Let it be, it is what it is."

— Collins Akowe

The official lineup for UST's 2025 campaign consists of ten holdovers, four rookies, and two players from their training pool. Among the rookies is Nigerian center Collins Awoke who came from the UAAP's high school ranks as the first FSA to win the Most Valuable Player award in Season 86 while suiting up for the rival NU–Nazareth Bullpups. He was a front runner for a back-to-back MVP title before the UAAP made a ruling that prohibits foreign players from winning such award. He ended up bagging the newly-created Best Foreign Student-Athlete honors in Season 87. His lofty per-game stats of 20.8 points, 18.3 rebounds, 2.3 assists, and 1.7 blocks in his senior high school year was testament to why he was the best player in the Juniors division.

"There were a few schools that showed interest (in recruiting me), the Big Four in the UAAP, and some from the NCAA, which felt surreal to me. But I chose UST because they made me grow from nothing into something. Before I got the chance to play in high school, I didn't know if things would work out because I was simply just a tall kid. I even doubted myself."

— Koji Buenaflor

Former Tiger Cubs Koji Buenaflor, Carl Manding, and team captain Charles Bucsit from the Season 87 Boys' basketball champion roster are the Growling Tigers' other rookies. Buenaflor, the 2025 National Basketball Training Center's fifth best high school player and Mythical team member of the National Finals, was being courted for recruitment by three other rival colleges before committing to the gold-and-white. He averaged 11.4 points and 7.9 rebounds in his senior year to help his team end their 24-year title drought. Manding, a member of the Under-18 national team that competed in the 2024 FIBA Asia Cup in Jordan, had initially committed to Ateneo before deciding to return to UST in August. The four freshmen are all eligible for five playing years beginning in Season 88.

=== Departures ===
Pos.	No.	Nat.	Player	Height	Year	High school	Notes
PF	4	(Philippines)	Christian Manaytay	6' 4"	4th	Sacred Heart School–Ateneo de Cebu	Graduated
SF	5	(United States)	Chase Lawrence Lane	6' 4"	5th	Covenant College Prep	Graduated
SF	17	(Philippines)	Miguel Pangilinan	6' 2"	5th	National University Nazareth School	Graduated
C	21	(Canada)	Zain Mahmood	6' 7"	2nd	Maranatha High School	Transferred to Far Eastern University
SG	23	(United States)	Geremy Jaylen Robinson Jr.	6' 1"	1st	Moanalua High School	Academic deficiencies
C	36	(Mali)	Hinda Mady dit Mohamed Tounkara	6' 7"	1st	Lycée Public de Kalabancoro	Forwent eligibility to turn professional

=== Acquisitions ===
Pos.	No.	Nat.	Player	Height	Year	High school	Notes
SF	8	(Philippines)	Hezekiah Charles Bucsit	6' 3"	1st	University of Santo Tomas	Rookie
PF	13	(Philippines)	Lorenzo Bangco	6' 4"	1st	University of the East	Promoted from Team B
PF	19	(Philippines)	Koji Ivan Buenaflor	6' 6"	1st	University of Santo Tomas	Rookie
PG	25	(Philippines)	Jiro Sevilla	5' 10"	1st	De La Salle Santiago Zobel School	Promoted from Team B
SG	26	(Philippines)	Carl Vincent Manding	6' 2"	1st	University of Santo Tomas	Rookie
C	28	(Nigeria)	Collins Akowe	6' 10"	1st	National University Nazareth School	Rookie/ foreign student-athlete

=== Recruiting class ===
Name	Pos.	Height	High school	Hometown	Commit date	Ref.
Koji Buenaflor	PF	6' 6"	University of Santo Tomas	San Jose del Monte	19 Apr 2025	
Koji Buenaflor	2025 NBTC Top 24 rank: 5 (National Finals #3 seed, Division 1 Mythical team, semifinalist with UST; All-Star game participant with Team Heart)					
Koji Buenaflor	2024 NBTC Top 24 rank: N/A (National Finals #4 seed, Division 1 quarterfinalist with UST)					
Koji Buenaflor	2023 NBTC Top 24 rank: N/A (National Finals #2 seed, Division 1 semifinalist with UST)					
Charles Bucsit	SF	6' 3"	University of Santo Tomas	Sta. Rosa, Laguna	19 Apr 2025	
Charles Bucsit	2025 NBTC Top 24 rank: N/A (National Finals #3 seed, Division 1 semifinalist with UST)					
Charles Bucsit	2024 NBTC Top 24 rank: N/A (National Finals #4 seed, Division 1 quarterfinalist with UST)					
Charles Bucsit	2023 NBTC Top 24 rank: N/A (National Finals #2 seed, Division 1 semifinalist with UST)					
Carl Manding	SG	6' 2"	University of Santo Tomas	Cebu City	4 Aug 2025	
Carl Manding	2025 NBTC Top 24 rank: N/A (National Finals #3 seed, Division 1 semifinalist with UST)					
Carl Manding	2024 NBTC Top 24 rank: N/A (National Finals #4 seed, Division 1 quarterfinalist with UST)					
Carl Manding	2023 NBTC Top 24 rank: N/A (National Finals #2 seed, Division 1 semifinalist with UST)					
Collins Akowe	C	6' 10"	National University Nazareth School	Nigeria	23 Jun 2025	
Collins Akowe	2024 SLAM Rising Stars Classic participant (with Team Hype)					
The National Basketball Training Center (NBTC) is a grassroots program in the Philippines that develops and ranks outstanding players from high schools who compete in a five month-long nationwide youth basketball tournament. The program has enabled local coaches to recruit skilled players to play collegiate basketball.
Since 2014, the SLAM Rising Stars Classic holds a yearly exhibition game that serves as a platform to showcase the talents of twenty-four of the best high school players from Metro Manila in front of coaches, scouts and media.

== Schedule and results ==
=== Preseason tournaments ===
The Filoil EcoOil Preseason Cup games were aired via livestream on the Facebook pages of Filoil EcoOil Sports and Smart Sports, and Filoil EcoOil Sports' YouTube channel.

Preseason game log

2025 PinoyLiga Global Invitational Cup : 5–0
Game	Date • Time	Opponent	Result	Record	High points	High rebounds	High assists	Location
1	Mar 25 • 12:00 pm	Nagoya Gakuin University	W 88–75	1–0	Paranada (14)	Tied (4)	Tied (3)	Quadricentennial Pavilion, Manila
2	Mar 26 • 9:30 am	UE Red Warriors	W 72–64	2–0	Tied (14)	Osang (9)	Llemit (5)	Quadricentennial Pavilion, Manila
3	Mar 27 • 9:30 am	EAC Generals	W 87–69	3–0	Tied (13)	Laure (8)	Robinson (3)	Quadricentennial Pavilion, Manila
4	Mar 28 • 11:00 am	Fil-Am Nation Select	W 98–66	4–0	Osang (18)	Osang (11)	Laure (5)	Quadricentennial Pavilion, Manila
5	Mar 30 • 10:00 am	UE Red Warriors; Championship game	W 80–71	5–0	Padrigao (21)	Osang (14)	Padrigao (4)	Enderun Gym, Taguig

2025 PinoyLiga Collegiate Cup : 4–6
Game	Date • Time	Opponent	Result	Record	High points	High rebounds	High assists	Location
1	May 3 • 2:00 pm	Perpetual Altas	L 76–98	0–1	Mara (21)	Mara (7)	Laure (5)	Enderun Gym, Taguig
2	May 4 • 2:00 pm	Diliman College Blue Dragons	L 75–76	0–2	Alao (15)	Kumbai (8)	Calum (3)	Enderun Gym, Taguig
3	May 6 • 6:00 pm	Benilde Blazers	W 92–87	1–2	Kumbai (19)	Kumbai (14)	Calum (6)	Enderun Gym, Taguig
4	May 18 • 2:00 pm	Lyceum Pirates	L 87–92	1–3	Mara (25)	Kumbai (13)	Tied (3)	Enderun Gym, Taguig
5	May 20 • 8:30 pm	JRU Heavy Bombers	L 63–74	1–4	Tied (14)	Kumbai (13)	Calum (3)	Enderun Gym, Taguig
6	May 27 • 7:30 pm	UP Fighting Maroons Team 1	L 64–86	1–5	Mahmood (12)	Calum (6)	Alao (3)	Enderun Gym, Taguig
7	Jun 4 • 11:00 am	Lyceum Pirates; Play-in round	W 90–85	2–5	Kumbai (20)	Kumbai (19)	Alao (5)	Enderun Gym, Taguig
8	Jun 5 • 6:00 pm	Perpetual Altas; Play-in round	W 91–81	3–5	Calum (27)	Kumbai (24)	Alao (5)	Enderun Gym, Taguig
9	Jun 7 • 5:00 pm	JRU Heavy Bombers; Quarterfinals	W 85–81	4–5	Tied (17)	Kumbai (17)	Alao (6)	Enderun Gym, Taguig
10	Jun 10 • 2:00 pm	JRU Heavy Bombers; Quarterfinals	L 55–57	4–6	Calum (21)	Kumbai (22)	Calum (3)	Enderun Gym, Taguig

2025 Filoil EcoOil 18th Preseason Cup : 5–3
Game	Date • Time	Opponent	Result	Record	High points	High rebounds	High assists	Location
1	May 22 • 4:00 pm	NU Bulldogs	W 75–71	1–0	Crisostomo (17)	Osang (8)	Padrigao (5)	Filoil EcoOil Centre, San Juan
2	May 29 • 12:00 pm	Adamson Soaring Falcons	W 69–62	2–0	Padrigao (22)	Osang (6)	Tied (3)	Filoil EcoOil Centre, San Juan
3	Jun 2 • 4:00 pm	FEU Tamaraws	L 63–72	2–1	Osang (17)	Tied (8)	Padrigao (8)	Filoil EcoOil Centre, San Juan
4	Jun 9 • 4:00 pm	UP Fighting Maroons	W 90–81	3–1	Crisostomo (24)	Osang (12)	Tied (4)	Filoil EcoOil Centre, San Juan
5	Jul 2 • 10:00 am	UE Red Warriors	W 71–65	4–1	Paranada (24)	Crisostomo (11)	Padrigao (7)	Filoil EcoOil Centre, San Juan
6	Jul 9 • 4:00 pm	De La Salle Green Archers	L 86–94	4–2	Danting (19)	Osang (13)	Padrigao (5)	Filoil EcoOil Centre, San Juan
7	Jul 11 • 2:00 pm	EAC Generals; Quarterfinal game	W 82–73	5–2	Crisostomo (17)	Crisostomo (13)	Paranada (5)	Filoil EcoOil Centre, San Juan
8	Jul 13 • 2:00 pm	NU Bulldogs; Semifinal game	L 84–96	5–3	Crisostomo (21)	Tied (9)	Cabañero (4)	Filoil EcoOil Centre, San Juan

2025 AsiaBasket International Invitational : 2–3
Game	Date • Time	Opponent	Result	Record	High points	High rebounds	High assists	Location
1	Jul 20 • 6:00 pm	Letran Knights	L 87–88	0–1	Llemit (19)	Akowe (21)	Padrigao (10)	Filoil EcoOil Centre, San Juan
2	Jul 21 • 6:00 pm	San Beda Red Lions	L 84–87	0–2	Llemit (21)	Akowe (15)	Paranada (7)	Filoil EcoOil Centre, San Juan
	Jul 22 • 2:00 pm	Lakas California	Cancelled due to Typhoon Crising					Filoil EcoOil Centre, San Juan
3	Jul 23 • 3:00 pm	Benilde Blazers; Quarterfinal game	W 80–67	1–2	Akowe (20)	Akowe (20)	Padrigao (7)	Filoil EcoOil Centre, San Juan
4	Jul 24 • 4:00 pm	San Beda Red Lions; Semifinal game	W 82–68	2–2	Buenaflor (14)	Crisostomo (11)	Tied (4)	Filoil EcoOil Centre, San Juan
5	Jul 25 • 5:30 pm	Adamson Soaring Falcons; Championship game	L 63–68	2–3	Crisostomo (12)	Akowe (20)	Crisostomo (5)	Filoil EcoOil Centre, San Juan

2025 Manuel Quezon Intercollegiate Basketball League : 6–3
Game	Date • Time	Opponent	Result	Record	High points	High rebounds	High assists	Location
1	Jun 21 • 1:00 pm	Villagers Montessori College	W 88–46	1–0	Calum (23)	Laure (11)	Teng (4)	Hoop Spirit Gym, Quezon City
2	Jul 9 • 1:00 pm	St. Clare College Saints	L 62–105	1–1	Loriaga (14)	Bangco (7)	Teng (5)	Trinity University of Asia, Quezon City
3	Jul 12 • 5:30 pm	CEU–Malolos Scorpions	W 91–77	2–1	Alao (16)	Laure (7)	Laure (6)	Hoop Spirit Gym, Quezon City
4	Jul 25 • 2:30 pm	University of Batangas Brahmans	W 82–78	3–1	Porter (21)	Porter (12)	Tied (4)	Central Recreation and Fitness Gym, Quezon City
5	Jul 30 • 1:00 pm	Adamson Soaring Falcons	W 78–56	4–1	Osang (22)	Osang (12)	Melecio (4)	Hoop Spirit Gym, Quezon City
6	Aug 2 • 1:00 pm	MCU Supremos	L 61–67	4–2	Osang (14)	Osang (16)	Alao (7)	Hoop Spirit Gym, Quezon City
7	Aug 6 • 1:00 pm	Diliman College Blue Dragons	W 88–75	5–2	Manding (24)	Jacob (7)	Tied (3)	Hoop Spirit Gym, Quezon City
8	Aug 10 • 2:30 pm	St. Clare College Saints; Semifinal game	L 57–76	5–3	Tied (12)	Porter (10)	Laput (3)	Central Recreation and Fitness Gym, Quezon City
9	Aug 16 • 1:00 pm	MCU Supremos; Battle for third	W 82–63	6–3	J. Pangilinan (15)	Porter (9)	J. Pangilinan (7)	Central Recreation and Fitness Gym, Quezon City

(#) Tournament seedings in parentheses.
All times are in UTC+08:00.

=== UAAP games ===
Elimination games are played in a double round-robin format and all of UST's games are televised on One Sports and the UAAP Varsity Channel and livestreamed through the Pilipinas Live app.

UAAP Season 88 game log

Elimination round: 8–6
Game	Date • Time	Opponent	Result	Record	High points	High rebounds	High assists	Location
1	Sep 21 • 4:33 pm	UP Fighting Maroons	W 87–67	1–0	Akowe (29)	Akowe (17)	Paranada (4)	Quadricentennial Pavilion, Manila
2	Sep 27 • 5:04 pm	De La Salle Green Archers	W 93–84	2–0	Cabañero (27)	Akowe (19)	Padrigao (9)	Araneta Coliseum, Quezon City
3	Oct 1 • 5:09 pm	NU Bulldogs	L 69–76	2–1	Cabañero (19)	Akowe (8)	Padrigao (6)	Quadricentennial Pavilion, Manila
4	Oct 4 • 1:48 pm	UE Red Warriors	W 111–99	3–1	Cabañero (22)	Akowe (17)	Cabañero (8)	Quadricentennial Pavilion, Manila
5	Oct 11 • 4:54 pm	Ateneo Blue Eagles	W 98–89^{3OT}	4–1	Cabañero (22)	Akowe (19)	Crisostomo (4)	Blue Eagle Gym, Quezon City
6	Oct 15 • 6:31 pm	FEU Tamaraws	W 92–80	5–1	Paranada (19)	Akowe (11)	Paranada (4)	Mall of Asia Arena, Pasay
7	Oct 18 • 5:28 pm	Adamson Soaring Falcons; End of R1 of eliminations	L 59–69	5–2	Cabañero (23)	Akowe (16)	Paranada (4)	Araneta Coliseum, Quezon City
8	Oct 25 • 4:37 pm	De La Salle Green Archers	L 77–86	5–3	Akowe (20)	Akowe (14)	Padrigao (10)	Mall of Asia Arena, Pasay
9	Oct 29 • 2:19 pm	Adamson Soaring Falcons	L 96–97^{OT}	5–4	Akowe (19)	Akowe (14)	Padrigao (8)	Mall of Asia Arena, Pasay
10	Nov 5 • 4:56 pm	UP Fighting Maroons	L 88–89	5–5	Akowe (26)	Akowe (16)	Padrigao (6)	Mall of Asia Arena, Pasay
	Nov 9 • 1:30 pm	FEU Tamaraws	Postponed due to Typhoon Uwan					Araneta Coliseum, Quezon City
11	Nov 12 • 2:11 pm	UE Red Warriors	W 109–97	6–5	Cabañero (19)	Akowe (16)	Padrigao (4)	Mall of Asia Arena, Pasay
12	Nov 15 • 4:37 pm	Ateneo Blue Eagles	W 67–59	7–5	Akowe (15)	Akowe (16)	Cabañero (6)	Araneta Coliseum, Quezon City
13	Nov 23 • 4:37 pm	NU Bulldogs	W 80–71	8–5	Crisostomo (13)	Akowe (11)	Paranada (5)	Mall of Asia Arena, Pasay
14	Nov 26 • 2:15 pm	FEU Tamaraws; End of R2 of eliminations	L 79–81	8–6	Crisostomo (28)	Akowe (9)	Padrigao (8)	Araneta Coliseum, Quezon City

Final Four: 0–1
Game	Date • Time	Seed	Opponent	Result	Series	High points	High rebounds	High assists	Location
1	Dec 3 • 4:50 pm	(#3)	(#2) UP Fighting Maroons	L 81–82	0–1 (8–7)	Cabañero (24)	Akowe (11)	Akowe (6)	Araneta Coliseum; Quezon City

(#) Tournament seedings in parentheses.
All times are in UTC+08:00.
Source: Livestats.ph

== UAAP statistics ==
=== Eliminations ===
Player	GP	GS	MPG	FGM	FGA	FG%	3PM	3PA	3P%	FTM	FTA	FT%	RPG	APG	SPG	BPG	TOV	PPG
Nic Cabañero	14	14	30.8	95	217	43.8	10	50	20.0	35	66	53.0	6.0	2.6	1.1	0.1	2.1	16.8
Collins Akowe	14	14	35.7	80	147	54.4	0	0	0.0	70	129	54.3	14.5	1.4	0.7	1.6	2.5	16.4
Gelo Crisostomo	14	9	23.3	56	121	46.3	21	52	40.4	15	23	65.2	6.4	1.5	1.4	1.1	1.1	10.6
Forthsky Padrigao	13	5	24.6	36	127	28.3	22	87	25.3	30	44	68.2	2.5	5.2	1.9	0.1	2.4	9.5
Mark Llemit	14	1	22.2	36	82	43.9	15	42	35.7	21	34	61.8	3.4	1.1	0.9	0.4	1.4	7.7
Amiel Acido	14	0	17.5	37	90	41.1	20	56	35.7	14	20	70.0	4.1	1.0	0.6	0.1	0.9	7.7
Kyle Paranada	14	9	19.2	31	87	35.6	11	36	30.6	31	39	79.5	1.6	2.8	0.6	0.0	1.9	7.4
Koji Buenaflor	12	5	10.5	16	35	45.7	1	7	14.3	12	19	63.2	1.9	0.3	0.3	0.3	0.7	3.8
Ice Danting	13	4	6.2	12	23	52.2	7	16	43.8	4	5	80.0	0.3	0.2	0.1	0.1	0.3	2.7
Ivanne Calum	14	0	6.6	12	20	60.0	0	1	0.0	3	7	42.9	0.7	0.4	0.4	0.0	0.7	1.9
Leland Estacio	14	9	8.9	6	27	22.2	4	17	23.5	1	11	9.1	1.2	0.5	0.2	0.0	0.1	1.2
Charles Bucsit	6	0	4.3	2	7	28.6	2	7	28.6	1	2	50.0	0.7	0.3	0.0	0.0	0.0	1.2
Jiro Sevilla	2	0	1.0	0	2	0.0	0	2	0.0	2	2	100.0	0.0	0.0	0.5	0.0	0.0	1.0
Echo Laure	11	0	2.7	5	10	50.0	0	1	0.0	0	0	0.0	0.9	0.0	0.1	0.0	0.2	0.9
Carl Manding	4	0	1.7	1	3	33.3	0	1	0.0	1	2	50.0	0.5	0.0	0.0	0.0	0.0	0.8
Lorenzo Bangco	4	0	1.5	1	3	33.3	0	0	0.0	0	0	0.0	0.5	0.3	0.0	0.0	0.0	0.5
Total	14		41.4	426	1,001	42.6	113	375	30.1	240	400	60.0	48.1	16.7	8.1	3.7	14.6	86.1
Opponents	14		41.4	433	1,072	40.4	113	374	30.2	165	251	65.7	44.7	17.4	8.4	3.5	14.5	81.7

=== Playoffs ===
Player	GP	GS	MPG	FGM	FGA	FG%	3PM	3PA	3P%	FTM	FTA	FT%	RPG	APG	SPG	BPG	TOV	PPG
Nic Cabañero	1	1	32.1	8	19	42.1	0	2	0.0	8	9	88.9	3	3	2	0	0	24
Gelo Crisostomo	1	0	21.0	6	11	54.5	3	6	50.0	0	0	0.0	7	0	0	1	0	15
Collins Akowe	1	1	36.5	4	12	33.3	0	0	0.0	3	4	75.0	11	6	0	3	2	11
Kyle Paranada	1	1	22.4	2	10	20.0	2	5	40.0	4	4	100.0	4	2	2	0	2	10
Forthsky Padrigao	1	0	24.5	3	13	23.1	0	5	0.0	0	0	0.0	2	4	1	0	0	6
Mark Llemit	1	0	23.8	3	5	60.0	0	1	0.0	0	1	0.0	1	0	0	0	1	6
Amiel Acido	1	0	20.2	1	5	20.0	1	4	25.0	1	1	100.0	8	0	2	0	3	4
Koji Buenaflor	1	1	6.5	2	4	50.0	0	2	0.0	0	0	0.0	1	0	0	0	0	4
Leland Estacio	1	1	11.0	0	1	0.0	0	1	0.0	1	2	50.0	2	0	0	0	0	1
Echo Laure	1	0	1.9	0	1	0.0	0	0	0.0	0	0	0.0	1	0	0	0	0	0
Total	1		40.0	29	81	35.8	6	26	23.1	17	21	81.0	45	15	7	4	8	81
Opponents	1		40.0	30	70	42.9	5	18	27.8	17	21	81.0	49	22	5	4	15	82

Legend
GP	Games played	GS	Games started	MPG	Minutes per game
FGM	Field-goal made	FGA	Field-goal attempts	FG%	Field-goal percentage
3PM	3-point field-goal made	3PA	3-point field-goal attempts	3P%	3-point field-goal percentage
FTM	Free-throw made	FTA	Free-throw attempts	FT%	Free-throw percentage
RPG	Rebounds per game	APG	Assists per game	SPG	Steals per game
BPG	Blocks per game	TOV	Turnovers per game	PPG	Points per game

Source: Livestats.ph

== Summary of games ==
"If you look at the preseason, it's still La Salle and UP, with National University and UST as dark horses."

— Tab Baldwin, Ateneo head coach

The consensus has not changed. During the UAAP's press launch in Greenhills, San Juan on September 15, the teams' head coaches still believe that the UP Fighting Maroons and the De La Salle Green Archers are the favorites to contend for the championship this season. But if anyone can play the spoiler's role, the coaches see either UST or the NU Bulldogs as the teams that are capable of pulling it off.

Much like the previous year, the UST community is in heightened anticipation due to their new recruits. The two graduating seniors in team captain Nic Cabañero and veteran point guard Forthsky Padrigao have both expressed the team's ultimate goal of going for the championship, unlike in the past year where they modestly tempered their expectations.

"It's championship or bust. With last year's Final Four finish, I think we have proven that we are able to compete with the top teams, but it's different this time. We need to show that we are not just capable of competing, but in winning against them as well. My teammates already gained the experience (of playing in the Final Four), so now we already know what we need to do to get to that higher level."

— Forthsky Padrigao

Getting to the Finals is a tall order for the Tigers. They have talented players, but they still show signs of inconsistency. Cabañero's shooting is still suspect, perhaps due to the old habit that he developed when his team had struggled during his first three years, and he would resort to one-on-one plays as the Tigers often relied on him for their offense. With Padrigao's arrival last year, offensive plays have been run smoother, but he is yet to regain his shooting form from his playing days with Ateneo. Mo Tounkara, their Malian center was their anchor on defense, and his double-digit point production was also a factor, as only he and Cabañero were the reliable scorers from last year. Tounkara's departure leaves a lot of uncertaincy for the team, as evidenced by their rebounding woes in the preseason.

UST has ramped up their recruitment for the second straight year, and they are somewhat pinning their chances on their rookies, with the Nigerian Collins Akowe tasked to fill in for Tounkara, as well as on the championship experience of the three former Tiger Cubs, headed by the 6-foot-6 Koji Buenaflor.

=== First round ===
UP Fighting Maroons

	1	2	3	4	Total
UST	31	26	13	17	87
UP	19	24	14	10	67

Akowe's collegiate debut became a showcase of dominance as the Growling Tigers handed the defending champions, the UP Fighting Maroons a 20-point, 87–67 beatdown. The Nigerian rookie came out with a double-double of 29 points and 17 rebounds, as UST sent notice to the other teams that the championship is no longer an exclusive affair between last year's two finalists.

The Tigers were able to break free in the first quarter after an early back-and-forth at the start of the game behind Kyle Paranada's outside shooting to end the period with a 12-point, 31–19 lead. UST held the Maroons scoreless in the opening minutes of the second period, increasing their lead to 18 at 37–19. UP's Harold Alarcon led a rally to pull his team to within ten, but Akowe and Paranada made back-to-back conversions to end the half with a 14-point, 57–43 advantage. Paranada scored 14 of his total output in the first half.

The Maroons fought back to trim the lead down to seven in the second half, but UST answered with their own run, as they recognized the mismatch that Akowe posed against his defenders in the paint. UP resorted to a Hack-a-Shaq strategy, which resulted to the big man taking 21 free throws and making 11 out his total 29 point-output. He was also able to convert 9-of-15 from the field, outclassing three different UP defenders thrown at him, with Miguel Palanca and Sean Alter both fouling out.

"We were already familiar with Collins' capabilities, and we did prepare for him, but... (for me, the defense) it should not be one-on-one, it has to be five against one. We did not react properly to adjust to the situation. They did not help each other defensively, and that was something that we need to learn from."

— Goldwin Monteverde, UP head coach

They began the fourth period by limiting the Maroons to only three points for eight minutes, as their lead went up to 25, at 85–60. UST has not won against the Maroons in the last nine games that they faced prior to this matchup. They last won in 2019, during their stepladder semifinals match, where they needed to beat UP twice to advance to the Finals. They met the Maroons thrice last year, where, after leading at the half, UP would take over and eventually win. In this latest game, the Tigers did not leave any chance for a comeback by the Maroons. Akowe was instrumental to quashing any effort from their opponent.

The Tigers missed the services of Padrigao, who had served a one-game suspension as a consequence of getting ejected from their Final Four game last season. Paranada took on the point guard duties and was able to tally 18 points on a 55-percent field goal shooting. Cabañero and Gelo Crisostomo added 9 and 8 points, respectively.

	1	2	3	4	Total
La Salle	27	22	25	10	84
UST	22	23	27	21	93

De La Salle Green Archers

Cabañero and Akowe put on stellar performances to help UST break their decade-long, 16-game losing streak against the De La Salle Green Archers with a come-from-behind, 93–84 win. The Tigers' last victory over their rivals was on October 11, 2015, during the second round of eliminations of Season 78.

"One of the things that I really like about Akowe is that his size does not hinder his mobility. He's got motor, which is really high, and it's really a dangerous combo for a player of his size. More importantly, it's also the effort that he puts in, so I think, this is really a big thing for UST—to have a guy that's hardworking. I think he blends well with the system. They're really coached well."

— Mike Phillips, La Salle center

Unlike their dominant win over UP, UST had to play catch-up against La Salle for almost the entire game. Cabañero set the tone early with offensive rebounds and putbacks to keep the Tigers within striking distance, but it was not enough as Akowe struggled in the first half due to the Archers' tight defense, which limited him to only eight points going into the break. Padrigao and Paranada, the team's two veteran guards guided their prized rookie by picking the opportunies to lob the ball at him down the paint. He was able to score 8 of his 12 second-half points in the fourth quarter when he found his bearings and was finally able to dominate at the post.

With the Archers shooting five three-pointers in the third quarter, UST found themselves trailing by 12 points, at 68–56. The Tigers hit their stride and went on a 14–2 run. Second-year forward Amiel Acido fired a three of his own in the middle of the rally that was capped by Cabañero's two free throws to tie the count at 70–all, with 1:30 left. The period ended with UST trailing by only two points, at 72–74. The burly team captain was also instrumental in shutting down La Salle's offense in the payoff period, where the Tigers outscored them, 21–10. The final quarter began with both teams trading baskets. It was when Paranada and Acido scored six straight points to break away from a 79–all tie for an 85–79 count. After the Archers' Doy Dungo shot his own three, the trio of Cabañero, Akowe and Padrigao made their own run to outscore the Archers, 8–2 to turn their three-point, 85–82 lead to ten, with a minute remaining on the clock.

"I did not know that it has been ten years since UST last won against La Salle, but I know that we are going up against them for my first game, so I really prepared for it. We were just sticking to our principles, in what we do as a team."

— Forthsky Padrigao

UST has already defeated both of last year's finalists in back-to-back games and still holds an unblemished record of 2–0.

Cabañero led the Tigers in scoring with 27 points, as Akowe finished with another double-double of 20 points and 19 rebounds. Acido also made a solid contribution of 13 points, on a 5-of-11 shooting and 6 rebounds. Padrigao announced his return after missing the Tigers' opening day game, tallying 12 points, 9 assists, 3 steals and a +15 rating in a commanding display of leadership and playmaking skills.

	1	2	3	4	Total
NU	18	22	18	18	76
UST	22	21	18	8	69

NU Bulldogs

UST has tasted their first loss at the hands of the NU Bulldogs, 69–76, after an offensive adrenaline push from NU's Jake Figueroa put the Tigers away in the last minute of the game. The game began with both teams groping for form. The Tigers inched their way to a four-point 22–18 first quarter lead on free throws by Acido and rookie Koji Buenaflor, who had missed their game against La Salle due to the flu virus.

They were leading, 30–23, before the Bulldogs' Tebol Garcia sparked an 11–4 run that resulted to a three-point 34–37 deficit for UST. Padrigao and Llemit were able to steer the Tigers back to the lead, at 43–40 with timely three-point shots of their own, heading into the halftime break. The lead changes carried over for the entire second half, with NU going for another six-point rally to take the driver's seat at 52–50, before Acido's triple capped a UST counter to regain their advantage at 61–58 at the conclusion of the third period. The Bulldogs were once again leading, 69–68 at the 2:23 mark, via a four-point swing, when Cabañero made a basket in the last 1:41 of the game to put the Tigers to within one, at 69–70. It was when Figueroa took control, first, firing a three-pointer to increase their lead to four, and then converting on a floater against the 6-foot-10 Akowe. Consecutive free throws from Paul Francisco and Steve Nash Enriquez sealed UST's loss at 69–76.

Akowe was kept in check throughout the game. Finishing with only five points, the Nigerian FSA shot for 1-of-7, with his lone field goal coming late in the game, at the 9:45 mark in the third quarter. As the rookie center struggled, UST was outscored down the paint, 28 to 46, and were outrebounded, 39 to 52. The Tigers also had a bad free throw-shooting afternoon, making only nine out of the 24 attempts that they were given at the stripe.

Cabañero and Acido led four Tigers in scoring double digits with 19 and 18 points, respectively. The team captain shot 8-of-19 from the field, while the sophomore combo guard who hit his career high in scoring made four three-point shots.

	1	2	3	4	Total
UST	29	30	24	28	111
UE	31	24	12	32	99

UE Red Warriors

UST completed their bounce-back win after defeating the UE Red Warriors, 111–99 in their home court at the QPav Arena. It was the league's highest scoring output since the 2023 season, when the UP Fighting Maroons scored 110 points against the Tigers in the first round of eliminations.

"It's (because of) the leadership of our vets, with Forthsky and Nic. They told the boys to not let go, and the breaks ultimately went our way."

— Bam Ledesma, UST assistant coach

The game began with the Warriors' rookie Nurjadden Datumalim making the first point, as UST struggled in the opening minutes and trailed UE at 15–24, then ended the 10-minute period behind by two at 29–31. The Tigers got going in the second frame, outscoring their opponent by six points at 30–24, and ending the half at 59–55. UE's team captain John Abate almost exclusively scored all of the Warriors' points in the second quarter. They were trailing by one with a minute left when Padrigao hit a three-pointer at the buzzer. The Tigers did not relinquish their lead until the game clock expired.

The third period ended with UST enjoying a 16-point, 83–67 lead. Padrigao and Akowe earlier sparked a 17–6 run, increasing their lead from four to 15, at 76–61. The gap widened to its biggest at 20 in the middle of the final period, as the Tigers put up a 100–80 tally. The Warriors' Mo Tañedo scored the final basket as the game ended with the win for UST. It was a futile effort for the Warriors, as their 32-point fourth quarter performance behind Abate and Dray Caoile's 27 and 23 points fell short. The one-and-done Caoile scored 15 of his total points in the first quarter.

Cabañero led the Tigers with 22 points, on a 9-of-19 field goal and made a season-high of eight assists. The team had a total of 25 assists that translated into 38 points. Akowe recorded another double-double of 18 points and 17 rebounds, and Padrigao had a field day shooting the lights out from downtown with five three-pointers to add to his total of 18 points. UST also had a productive bench contribution, outscoring UE, 36–18, as Llemit and Acido each had 11 points.

	1	2	3	4	OT	2OT	3OT	Total
Ateneo	28	9	16	13	8	11	4	89
UST	20	13	22	11	8	11	13	98

Ateneo Blue Eagles

The UAAP's men's basketball division held a game for the first time at the Blue Eagle Gym after two decades, where a gritty match-up between UST and Ateneo resulted to a 98–89 triple overtime win for the Growling Tigers. It also marked the first time for any men's game to go to three extra periods in the Final Four era of the league.

"Triple overtime, throw out the numbers, it was a show of heart by both teams. The players were going down due to fatigue and cramps, but they fought through it. No one wanted to give in, until it came to the third overtime. We were just able to make more shots than them in the end."

— Juno Sauler, UST assistant coach

Ateneo got the game started with Shawn Tuano receiving a pass from Jared Bahay for a fast break layup for a 2–0 score. The Eagles employed a familiar UST run and gun ploy to dictate the game's tempo, as it opened up opportunities for transition baskets. Ateneo's Kymani Ladi and Dom Escobar's post games gave the Eagles a 12-point, 18–6 lead, as the Tigers navigated their way to within eight at 20–28 after a conversion by Padrigao towards the end of the first quarter.

The second quarter started with both teams struggling to find a basket, until Tuano was able to soar for an electrifying slam dunk. UST was able to counter with 13 unanswered points, with Cabañero leading the rally to pull his team within striking distance at 33–37. The Tigers limited their opponents to just nine points in the second period and eventually tied the score in the third period at 53–all, from being down, 41–48 following Crisostomo's triple. UST was leading by three at 63–60 with less than four minutes left in the fourth period when the Eagles scored six straight baskets to gain the upperhand at 66–63. Padrigao fired a go-ahead three-pointer to force an overtime as the fourth quarter clock expired.

Crisostomo made another three to start the extra period, but Ateneo's Bahay, who only had a single field goal in regulation made back-to-back threes to pull his team ahead at 72–69. Padrigao countered with his own triple in the next play to even the score once again. Crisostomo and the Eagles' Tuano traded baskets for yet another tie, until the ball found its way into Cabañero's hands. The super senior missed the game-winning shot, causing the game to go to another overtime period. The Tigers began the second extra period with a 6–1 run to lead at 80–75 and had maintained it until the last three minutes, after an exchange of a triple by Bahay and two free throws by Crisostomo, when Ateneo broke free with a 7–2 rally to wrest the lead by one, at 85–84. Akowe kept missing his free throws but made both when they mattered the most. With the clock down to 31 seconds, the rookie sank his charities to tie the game at 85–all and keep UST's winning chances alive. Cabañero missed another game-winning shot from behind the arc, sending the game to a third extension.

In the deciding third overtime period, the Tigers held Ateneo to only four points while scoring 13 of their own. Akowe, who had logged in a record total of 51 minutes, led a 9–0 run that broke UST free from the deadlock to lead at 94–85. The Blue Eagles had a depleted squad going into the game's third extension. Divine Adili had fouled out, while Ladi was experiencing cramps, and Bahay's shoulder injury had started to affect his game. To make matters worse, Cabañero's three-point play in the middle of their run drew Escobar's fifth foul.

Cabañero led the Tigers with 22 points and 11 rebounds. Two others also finished in double-doubles, as Akowe had his usual 20 points and 19 rebounds, while Crisostomo had his breakout game with 18 points and 17 rebounds. Padrigao was also able to compile 20 points in his return trip to his former team's homecourt, that was attended by 5,373 fans.

	1	2	3	4	Total
FEU	21	26	15	18	80
UST	25	21	17	29	92

FEU Tamaraws

UST relied on a late fourth quarter surge to defeat the FEU Tamaraws, 92–80 and moved to a share of the lead in the standings with a 5–1 record. The Tigers, now on a three-game winning streak, are on their best start since the 2015 season, when they won eight of their first nine games.

"We had a sloppy start, but the three overtimes against Ateneo helped us. Our coaches kept on motivating us to push our limits, so this win was due to the team's collective effort."

— Nic Cabañero

With UST up at 9–2 after tip-off, the Tamaraws made a seven-point run led by rookie Kirby Mongcopa to even the score. It would set the trend of the game's numerous ties and lead changes. The Tigers' post presence, however, proved to be a challenge for the Tamaraws, as their bigs found their way to score, with Buenaflor finishing with a dunk and Llemit leading their fast break offense for a seven-point, 16–9 swing. The first period ended with UST gaining a four-point, 25–21 lead, even as Tamaraws Neil Owens and Janrey Pasaol scrambled for back-to-back baskets.

A shot block by FEU's Mo Konateh signaled the start of the second quarter, which sparked a four-point run by the Tamaraws. Padrigao was able to convert a contested three to trim FEU's lead, 46–47 at halftime. The second half began with FEU's 9–0 run, behind Pasaol's baskets. The Tigers were able to find their stride, resulting to a 5–12 exchange for 52–58 score. They were able to take back the lead at the end of the period on a one-point, 63–62 tally.

"Maybe, our problem during the fourth quarter was in the way we executed our defense. We needed to make our stops and runs, because UST is so talented that we cannot afford to just trade baskets with them."

— Janrey Pasaol, FEU point guard

The Tamaraws once again had another run at the start of the final quarter with back-to-back triples by Jorick Bautista. It was when Cabañero and Paranada combined for seven points to give their team an 80–73 lead from a 15–5 rally. FEU called for timeout, after which, Konateh's tip-in and Pasaol's and-one pulled the Tamaraws to within two. Akowe, who was heavily guarded throughout the match, was able to break away with a layup against Konateh to give the Tigers an 84–80 advantage. Crisostomo next made back-to-back three-pointers to increase their lead to ten, at 90–80. The Tamaraws failed to convert on their last four attempts as they went scoreless in the last 3:49 minutes of the game.

Paranada, who played for only 18 minutes, led in scoring with 19 points on a 7-for-8 shooting. Cabañero and Crisostomo each had 14 points, while contributing eight and seven rebounds, respectively. Akowe had another double-double of 12 points and 11 rebounds, on top of four blocks.

	1	2	3	4	Total
UST	16	9	18	16	59
Adamson	16	22	15	16	69

Adamson Soaring Falcons

The Adamson Soaring Falcons proved again that they are the best defensive team in the UAAP, as they stopped UST's three-game run with a 69–59 victory to end their first-round campaign at the Araneta Coliseum.

Cabañero displayed fancy footwork skills down the lane as he scored a floater to give the Tigers an early 13–8 lead. The Falcons, however, opened fire with an 8–3 run to end the first period tied at 16–all. The second quarter began in a back-and-forth trade of baskets by the two teams. The score was tied at 22–all when the Falcons' Mathew Montebon made a step-back jumper to spark a 16–3 rally, sending UST to a 13-point, 25–38 deficit at the end of the half. The Tigers were limited to only nine points against their opponents' 22 in the second period.

Cabañero took on the scoring cudgels for the Tigers in the third quarter, making ten of UST's 18 points. His three-point shot put his team to within eight, at 36–44, as UST oustscored Adamson, 18–15 at the end of the period.

The Tigers tried to mount a comeback early in the fourth quarter after Paranada's running looper trimmed down Adamson's lead from 13 to five, at 50–55. The Falcons' Cedrick Manzano and AJ Fransman kept the Tigers at bay, scoring in succession to push their team's lead to 12 at 65–53. UST made another go with Crisostomo hitting a three-pointer to bring his team to within six, at 59–65, with under two minutes remaining. This would be the Tigers' last basket, as the Falcons' defense forced them to miss their succeeding shot attempts.

Akowe was held down to a low-scoring output with a 3-of-11 shooting, despite finishing with another double-double of 10 points and 16 rebounds. Cabañero led the team with 23 points in a losing effort. The Tigers' bench was outscored, 16–42 as no other UST player outside of the two scored in double digits.

=== Second round ===
The Growling Tigers ended the first round of eliminations at second place with a 5–2 record, their best start since 2015, when they won six games against one loss. This season's two losses came at the hands of the league's two best defensive teams, where they were both heavily outrebounded, 39–52 by the NU Bulldogs, and 40–50 by the Adamson Soaring Falcons.

"I also do not know, but whenever they (Adamson) are up against us, I feel that there's really something going on with them, like they're extra motivated to beat us. But seriously, they are the best defensive team in the league."

— Nic Cabañero

Adamson, in particular has been a thorn on the side of UST. Their post-pandemic head-to-head record stands at 3–6, and after the first round, the Falcons are ranked first in the least points scored by their opponents against them, at 62.4 per game, while also limiting their opponents to a league-best of 36 percent in field goal conversions.

"I wouldn't get those numbers if the team and the coaches aren't working well together. I'm only doing my job and fulfilling my role. The only thing that I'm thinking about is to win the championship and leave a lasting legacy with UST. Going into the second round, I still need to improve on my defense and play more as a leader. I've been doing this for a while now and I'll just continue to do my role."

— Nic Cabañero

Cabañero is capable of scoring in isolation, utilizing his size to create separation from defenders in mid-range situations. Alongside point guards Padrigao and Paranada, Cabañero has contributed to UST's offensive production. Cabañero's perimeter scoring ability has complemented Akowe's interior play. The fifth-year team captain leads in point production with 19.4 points per game at the end of the first round and has emerged as a favorite to win this season's MVP. Cabañero ranks sixth in the MVP race with 76.6 statistical points.

Despite getting outrebounded in their matches against NU and Adamson, the Tigers lead the league in the first round with the highest team average of 49.1 rebounds per game, and their frontcourt this season is responsible for the high statistic. Akowe logs 15.3 boards per outing, while Crisostomo contributes a steady seven rebounds per game. Though ineligible for the MVP award, the rookie FSA is running second in the race with 84.3 statistical points with per-game averages that compliment his rebounding, with 16.3 points, 2.0 blocks, 1.3 assists, and 1.0 steal. With these numbers, the Nigerian center is the leading candidate for the Rookie of the Year and the Best Foreign Student-Athlete awards.

"I think, my primary role in the team is to give my teammates second-chance points by grabbing offensive rebounds, so I consider it a bonus whenever I score or do well defensively."

— Gelo Crisostomo

Crisostomo has displayed an improved skillset this season as well, while deflecting the spotlight to their team's noticeable upside in shooting. Their coaching staff has adopted a free-flowing system for their ball movement, allowing the players to form a deep trust among themselves. While his rebounding and blocking averages per game are as efficient as last season, where he tallies almost 7 boards and 1 rejection, his scoring has increased to 8.3 points per game, from 4.6. He goes for ball possession more this year with 1.7 steals per game, compared to last year's 0.4, and his three-point shooting has also improved, with a field goal percentage of 38.1, compared to 27.3 from the past season. One game that stood out for Crisostomo was from their triple overtime win over Ateneo, when he scored 18 points and grabbed 17 rebounds that earned him Player of the Week honors.

Aside from leading the league in rebounds, UST also ranks first in scoring and two-point conversions, with 87.0 points per game and a 49.4 field goal percentage. Their second-chance point-average of 18.9 per game is also the league's best record, while their 38.3 points in the paint lands them second in the eight-team field. On the defensive end, the Tigers also pace the league in steals with 9.7 per game, and in forcing turnovers on the opponent with 16.4 a game.

"I think the reason why we are on top of the standings is that this group, they truly believe that they stand a chance, because there were doubts in the past. But now, they can sense it, that if they do their part collectively, their chances of winning is big. The things that we did right in the first round, we just have to continue doing them, and then we have to get better on the weak aspects and correct our mistakes. It's really good that this second round, we are given the chance to prove ourselves."

— Japs Cuan, UST assistant coach

Among the things that the team needs to improve on are in controlling their opponents' point production, where they rank sixth in giving up 80.6 points per game.

	1	2	3	4	Total
UST	17	19	15	26	77
La Salle	24	28	12	22	86

De La Salle Green Archers

The Growling Tigers' fourth-quarter rally fell short as the De La Salle Green Archers escaped with an 86–77 win to start their second-round campaign. They began the game with a three-pointer by Llemit, but Cabañero could not stop La Salle's JC Macalalag, who made two successive threes of his own to put the Archers on top at 13–9. With La Salle's big men tightly guarding Akowe, the Tigers could not collar their rebounds on the defensive end, allowing the Archers to get multiple second-chance points. La Salle's Luis Pablo was able to score a putback from a missed shot by EJ Gollena. The Archers extended their lead to seven, at 19–12, after Vhoris Marasigan converted on a jumper. Paranada made a triple off a timeout by UST, sparking a 5–0 run. It was when La Salle sent their rookie Guillian Quines to the floor and made an instant impact, firing a three of his own, as the Archers got their five points back to lead, 24–17 at the end of the first quarter.

The Tigers found themselves trailing by 22 points, at 30–52 after the Archers' Jacob Cortez took control in the second period, firing two uncontested baskets in succession to lead an 8–1 run. Padrigao and Ice Danting drained back-to-back three-pointers to end the half trailing at 36–52.

"UST is a really strong contender this year with the tremendous brand of basketball that they are displaying, but we made our preparations and we got our players ready with confidence for whatever they were going to throw at us."

— Topex Robinson, La Salle head coach

The Tigers got their rhythm going in the second half and had gone full steam in the final period, as they rallied to within six points at 70–76, with three-and-a-half minutes remaining on the clock. Crisostomo was able to convert a triple just before their shot clock expired. The two teams traded baskets for the next three minutes, until La Salle's Gollena and Earl Abadam eluded the Tigers' defense by scoring from different angles to increase their lead to nine, at 82–73 in the last 30 seconds.

Akowe tallied another double-double of 20 points and 14 rebounds. Crisostomo, Llemit, and Cabañero added 15, 13, and 12 points, while Padrigao made a game-high of 10 assists in a losing effort by the Tigers. They have now lost twice in a row for the first time this season.

	1	2	3	4	OT	Total
Adamson	23	24	12	30	8	97
UST	20	22	22	25	7	96

Adamson Soaring Falcons

UST lost again against the Adamson Soaring Falcons in overtime, at 96–97, when the Falcons' Matty Erolon drained a triple in the dying seconds of the extension period.

The Growling Tigers, now on a three-game losing skid, made crucial misses at the free throw line near the end of both regulation and the extension period. Veterans Cabañero and Padrigao both missed their charities as Adamson was making their run with under a minute left in the fourth quarter. Crisostomo made a triple to increase UST's lead to six, at 88–80, with thirty seconds left in the period. Akowe was whistled for a technical foul and Adamson's Ray Allen Torres converted. Torres, in return was called for a flagrant foul on Padrigao at the 0:22 mark, but Padrigao uncharacteristically missed both free throws. As the play resumed with the Tigers in possession, Cabañero was fouled by Montebon, but he also missed both of his foul shots. The rebound went to Torres, who passed to Montebon for a triple, putting the Falcons to within four, at 84–88. Padrigao was fouled again in the next play, this time making the first, but missing the second, with the ball getting into the hands of Adamson's Earl Medina. Padrigao fouled Torres, who made both free throws, bringing the Falcons to within three, at 86–89, with nine seconds left in regulation. Paranada made a bad pass, which was intercepted by Adamson's Manzano. Medina gave an assist to Montebon who shot another triple to tie the score as the buzzer sounded.

The Falcons opened the extension period with a three-pointer by Torres. Akowe was able to score on a putback, from Padrigao's miss. Cabañero was fouled midway in the period, making both free throws for the lead, at 93–92. A foul by Llemit on Erolon sent the lead back to Adamson. With under a minute remaining, a rebounding scuffle on Llemit's missed jump shot resulted to OJ Ojarikre fouling Akowe. The Tigers' big man made both of his charities to retake the lead at 95–94. A missed jumper by Montebon was rebounded by Akowe, who was fouled and sent to the line again. This time, the Nigerian rookie missed his second free throw, but was still rebounded by Llemit, who passed to a waiting Crisostomo for a missed three. With the clock winding down to 16 seconds, Medina got the board and passed to a driving Torres. He faked a layup and passed to a guarded Montebon, who was waiting at the three-point line. He made an extra pass to an open Erolon who scored a three for a one-point lead. He was fouled by Cabañero in the process, making it a four-point play, with eight seconds remaining. Erolon deliberately missed his charity, which was rebounded by Akowe, who immediately passed to Padrigao. With two seconds remaining, Padrigao heaved a shot near midcourt and missed, with the time expiring, giving the Falcons the win.

	1	2	3	4	Total
UP	21	24	23	21	89
UST	26	21	16	25	88

UP Fighting Maroons

The Growling Tigers lost against the UP Fighting Maroons, 88–89 in their second-round match. UP's Alarcon led his team on both ends, as he scored the Maroons' final baskets, all contested by UST's defenders, and was instrumental in denying the Tigers' back-to-back attempts at making a shot in the dying seconds of the game. Following a missed bank shot by Acido, a scuffle for the rebound went Akowe's way with 3.6 seconds remaining. An inbound by Llemit to the Nigerian rookie was tapped away by Alarcon as the time expired, giving UP a one-point win.

The Tigers were subjected to a hacking spree, as the Maroons were called for a game-high of 38 team fouls in the game, but the Tigers could not capitalize as they shot a miserable 28-of-52 from the free throw line. UST at one point led by as many as 15 points, until Padrigao went down with a sprained ankle in the third quarter and had to sit out the rest of the game.

Akowe had another double-double of 26 points and 16 rebounds. Cabañero and Acido added 18 and 10 points, respectively. UST has fallen to their fourth straight loss and is yet to win a game in the second round.

	1	2	3	4	Total
UST	33	24	30	22	109
UE	16	25	26	30	97

UE Red Warriors

UST ended their losing streak with a 109–97 win over the winless UE Red Warriors. They set the pace early to erect a 33–16 lead at the end of the first period. Having big leads throughout the game, the Tigers were up by as many as 20 points in the final quarter when the Warriors attempted a late-game comeback behind rookie Dylan Despi's exploits to threaten within nine, at 83–92. Llemit, who had been struggling offensively, was able to convert on back-to-back triples that sparked an 8–0 run by UST to bring the lead back to 17, at 100–83.

Cabañero topscored for the Tigers with 19 points. Four others scored in double figures, with Akowe, Crisostomo, Padrigao, and Acido contributing 16, 14, 11, and 10 points, respectively.

	1	2	3	4	Total
Ateneo	18	15	13	13	59
UST	25	10	18	14	67

Ateneo Blue Eagles

The Growling Tigers boosted their Final Four hopes after a crucial 67–59 win over the Ateneo Blue Eagles, as they climbed to a solo third-place spot in the standings with 7 wins against 5 losses. They overtook La Salle who had fallen to 6–5 after their recent loss to FEU.

The Tigers had kept the Blue Eagles at bay with a slim 46–44 lead late in the third quarter before they were able to break away with a 7-point, 53–46 lead to end the period. Padrigao poured in all of his six points in the opener of the final period with back-to-back three-pointers to increase their lead to ten. Ateneo, however, threatened within five, at 59–64 with 23 ticks left on the clock. Crisostomo sealed the win after making both of his free throws. The Tigers regained their shooting form at the foul line, making 22-of-28 for a 78.5 percent efficiency.

Akowe led UST with another double-double of 15 points and 16 rebounds. Cabañero, Crisostomo, and Acido added 14, 10, and 9 points, respectively.

	1	2	3	4	Total
UST	16	21	21	22	80
NU	19	19	15	18	71

NU Bulldogs

UST became the third team to qualify to the Final Four after their 80–71 win over the league-leading NU Bulldogs. Trailing by small deficits from the first period, the Growling Tigers went on a 13–1 run in the third quarter to take the driver's seat at 58–53, from being down at 45–52. They went on to take control in the final period, to increase their lead to 11, halted briefly by a layup from NU's Omar John, until a back-to-back three by Crisostomo and Llemit kept their opponents at bay.

Crisostomo, who had come off the bench, topscored for the team with 13 points. Akowe had another double-double of 11 markers and 11 boards. Acido and Llemit also scored in double figures with 11 points apiece.

The Tigers, with one game remaining in the eliimination rounds, improved to an 8–5 record, with a full game ahead of the fourth-running De La Salle Green Archers.

	1	2	3	4	Total
FEU	14	32	17	18	81
UST	8	17	23	31	79

FEU Tamaraws

UST ended the elimination rounds with a 79–81 loss against the FEU Tamaraws. FEU, determined to win for a chance at a playoff for the last remaining Final Four slot got the game going by limiting the Tigers to a low first-quarter field goal. They went on to pour 32 points in the next period, as UST found themselves trailing by 23 points just before the halftime buzzer sounded.

"Kudos to UST. They came out, played hard and did not just lay down. I'm sure Coach Pido went into halftime and told his boys to play the game the right way. I think all the other teams would have to respect that because they really tried to find a way to win."

— Sean Chambers, FEU head coach

This match was in fact, a non-bearing game for the Tigers as they are already assured of the number three seeding due to a superior quotient over La Salle, even if the Archers win their final elimination game and tie UST's 8–6 record. But still, they made a run in the final minutes of the fourth quarter to chop down the Tamaraws' big lead. Crisostomo's two steals and basket conversions brought the Tigers to within three, at 77–80 with under a minute to go. In the final play, a pass to Llemit on a fastbreak would have tied the score, but the third-year wing opted to go for a layup. This resulted to a one-point deficit for UST, at 79–80 with two seconds remaining. Llemit fouled FEU's Jorick Bautista on the inbound, sending him to the line for his penalty free throws. Bautista made the first and intentionally missed the second, as the Tigers scrambled for the rebound and hastily threw a shot at midcourt with the game clock expiring.

Crisostomo topscored for the Tigers with a career-high of 28 points. Cabañero added 17, as no other player from their team scored in double digits. This game was originally scheduled for November 9, but was postponed as a precaution to the oncoming Typhoon Uwan.

=== Final Four ===
	1	2	3	4	Total
UST	11	25	26	19	81
UP	19	24	22	17	82

UP Fighting Maroons

"I'm very proud of my young team, but of course, with a team like UST, we really respect their program. We knew that it wasn't going to be easy for us, but then, Terrence and Harold, the whole team—they responded to the challenge, and it makes me proud to see that as a coach."

— Goldwin Monteverde

The Growling Tigers met the UP Fighting Maroons again in the Final Four and they were once again burdened with a twice-to-win disadvantage. They were trailing for half of the game until things got going for them in the second half. Padrigao was able to hit a floater to give the Tigers a two-point, 81–79 lead with under a minute to go. Both teams missed their succeeding shot attempts until an opportunity for a fast break opened for the Maroons, where they spotted Fortea open for a pull-up three to put UP ahead by one, at 82–81 with 48 seconds remaining. UST had several chances to retake the lead, but UP's defense gave them fits as Cabañero's attempt to drive at the basket was foiled by the Maroons' Francis Nnoruka. UST was able to get the rebound, and with 13 seconds left, Cabañero faced Alarcon's tight guard as he missed a fade-away jumper. The Maroons were able to collar the board and held on to the ball until the game clock expired, allowing the reigning champions to escape with a 1-point victory.

Cabañero topscored for UST with 24 points. Crisostomo added 15 points and 7 rebounds, and Akowe, who was the main recipient of UP's tight defense was still able to put up a double-double of 11 points and 11 rebounds.

"I don't know. We still don't know what will happen, if we're still going to be the coaches, but I'm okay with whatever decision they will make. I know that what we did was the right thing. We revived a dying program and brought it back to the Final Four."

— Pido Jarencio, Growling Tigers head coach

Nearing the end of his three-year contract, Coach Pido Jarencio stated that the future of the school's basketball program remains uncertain. After a tough first year, where his squad was still undergoing rebuilding and lost their starting center at the start of the season, he was able to turn the program around by sending the Tigers to the Final Four, which led to a podium finish, and despite another semifinals appearance this year, they fell short with a fourth-place final ranking. An extension of his tenure would ensure the continuity of the Tigers' ascent into contention, with fresh recruits ready to suit up for the next season.

"It boils down to the breaks of the game. We designed the last two plays around Nic, and he really was open for the shot. They could have called the goaltending, but it was let go. The second time, it was still Nic who was open, but it's really the breaks of the game. We did our best, and I can truly say that we didn't hold back. There were no shortcomings on our end. We did it for the UST community, to give back for all their support."

— Pido Jarencio, Growling Tigers head coach

In their Final Four game, Jarencio regrets the two missed shots of Cabañero which could have brought the win for the team, but he also praised them for the effort that they gave. In particular, he believed that Nnoruka's block on his graduating team captain should have been called a goaltending.

== Awards ==
Name	Tournament	Award	Date	Ref.
Team	PinoyLiga Global Invitationals	Champions	30 Mar 2025	
Team	Mayor Kirk Asis Basketball Invitational	Runners-up	29 Jun 2025	
Team	AsiaBasket International Invitational	Runners-up	25 Jul 2025	
Forthsky Padrigao	PinoyLiga Global Invitationals	Finals MVP, Mythical team	30 Mar 2025	
Nic Cabañero	PinoyLiga Global Invitationals	Mythical team	30 Mar 2025	
Nic Cabañero	UAAP Men's basketball	Mythical team	14 Dec 2025	
Peter Osang	University Belt Basketball Cup	MVP, Mythical team	27 May 2025	
Mark Llemit	University Belt Basketball Cup	Mythical team	27 May 2025	
Mark Llemit	AsiaBasket International Invitational	Mythical team	25 Jul 2025	
Joseph Kumbai	PinoyLiga Collegiate Cup	Best FSA, Mythical team	21 Jun 2025	—
Ivanne Calum	PinoyLiga Collegiate Cup	Mythical team	21 Jun 2025	—
Japs Cuan	PinoyLiga Collegiate Cup	Coach of the Tournament	21 Jun 2025	—
Collins Akowe	AsiaBasket International Invitaional	MVP, Mythical team	25 Jul 2025	
Collins Akowe	UAAP Men's basketball	Rookie of the Year, Mythical team	14 Dec 2025	
Collins Akowe	UAAP Men's basketball	Player of the Week	20–28 Sep 2025	
Gelo Crisostomo	UAAP Men's basketball	Player of the Week	8–12 Oct 2025	
Gelo Crisostomo	Filoil Preseason Cup	Mythical team	27 Jul 2025	
Jun Melecio	Manuel Quezon Intercollegiate Basketball League	Mythical team	13 Aug 2025	
