= 2024 UST Growling Tigers basketball team =

Basketball team in the Philippines

2024 UST Growling Tigers men's basketball

UAAP Season 87 semifinalist

Record
- Elims rank: #3
- Final rank: #3
- 2024 record: 7–8 (7–7 elims)
- Head coach: Pido Jarencio (10th season)
- Assistant coaches: Juno Sauler; Peter Martin
- Captain: Nic Cabañero (4th season)

The 2024 UST Growling Tigers men's basketball team represented the University of Santo Tomas in the 87th season of the University Athletic Association of the Philippines. The men's basketball tournament for the academic year 2024–25 began on September 7, 2024, and the host school for the season was the University of the Philippines.

The Tigers made it back to the playoffs for the first time since 2019 after finishing the double round-robin eliminations at third place with 7 wins against 7 losses. It was also the first time in eight years when a bottom-ranked team qualified to the semifinals the following season. The Adamson Soaring Falcons, who had a 3–11 record in 2015 ended up as the fourth-ranked team in 2016.

UST, however, lost to the second-seeded UP Fighting Maroons in their Final Four match and ended their season at the podium as second runners-up.

They had an average winning margin of 11.9 points and an average losing margin of 10.0 points. Two of their games resulted in blowouts, with the Tigers losing against the De La Salle Green Archers by 21 points in the first round and then winning over Adamson by 26 points in the second round. Their second-round game against the Archers resulted to a 7-point overtime loss.

Nic Cabañero was selected to the Mythical team during the presentation of awards. He was ranked sixth in the players' MVP tally with 61.0 statistical points and was the league's second leading scorer with an average of 16.3 points per game. He had a season-high of 27 points in their second-round game against the UE Red Warriors.

Third year veteran Forthsky Padrigao, who had transferred from Ateneo led the league in assists with 6.1 per game, while rookie Amiel Acido was chosen Player of the Week by the Collegiate Press Corps during the final week of the elimination rounds in late November.

== Roster ==
The Growling Tigers presented 18 players for the UAAP media day photo shoot on August 29, 2024. The roster was finalized on September 5, 2024, with forward Lorenzo Bangco and Nigerian center Peter Osang getting cut from the official 16-man lineup.

UST Growling Tigers roster
Players
Coaches

Pos.	No.	Nat.	Name	Height	Year	High School
SG	1	(United States)	Leland Reuben Estacio	6'2" (1.88m)	3rd	Franklin High School
PG	2	(Philippines)	Bevir Ivanne Calum	5'11" (1.8m)	2nd	St. Louis School – Don Bosco
PG	3	(United States)	Kyle Brandon Paranada	5'9" (1.75m)	3rd	Montgomery High School
PF	4	(Philippines)	Christian Manaytay	6'4" (1.93m)	4th	Sacred Heart School-Ateneo de Cebu
PF	5	(United States)	Chase Lawrence Lane	6'4" (1.93m)	5th	Covenant College Prep
SG	9	(Philippines)	Nicael Dominie Cabañero (C)	6'3" (1.91m)	4th	University of Santo Tomas
PF	10	(Philippines)	Mark Angelo Crisostomo	6'5" (1.96m)	2nd	Sta. Teresita National High School
PG	11	(Philippines)	Rence Keith Sean Padrigao	5'11" (1.8m)	3rd	Ateneo de Manila
SF	12	(Philippines)	Glenn Isaac Danting	6'3" (1.91m)	1st	University of the Assumption
PF	14	(Philippines)	Mark Allen Llemit	6'3" (1.91m)	2nd	University of Santo Tomas
SF	17	(Philippines)	Miguel Pangilinan	6'2" (1.88m)	5th	National University Nazareth School
SG	20	(Philippines)	Leonardo Amiel Acido	6'3" (1.91m)	1st	University of Perpetual Help
C	21	(Canada)	Zain Mahmood	6'7" (2.01m)	1st	Maranatha High School
SG	23	(United States)	Geremy Jaylen Robinson Jr.	6'1" (1.85m)	1st	Moanalua High School
C	29	(Philippines)	Joachim Eddie Laure	6'5" (1.96m)	3rd	National University Nazareth School
C	36	(Mali)	Hinda Mady dit Mohamed Tounkara	6'7" (2.01m)	1st	Lycée Public de Kalabancoro

Head coach

- (Philippines) Alfredo Lorenzo Jarencio

Assistant coach(es)

- Marco Januz Sauler
- Victor Pedro Martin
- John Paul Cuan
- Juben Ledesma
- Jeric Marco Fortuna
- Alfredo Jarencio II
- Ian Joseph Herrera

Strength & conditioning coach(es)

- Reil Vinard Espino
- Ronald Christopher Cua
- Jose Avelino Vergara

Team manager

- Waiyip Chong
- Eric Ang

Legend

- (C) Team captain
- Injured

- [ Roster]

===Depth chart===

Pos.	Starting 5	Bench 1	Bench 2	Bench 3
C	Tounkara	Manaytay	Laure
PF	Crisostomo	Llemit	Mahmood
SF	Danting	Pangilinan	Lane
SG	Cabañero	Acido	Estacio
PG	Padrigao	Paranada	Robinson	Calum

== Roster changes ==
A total of nine players have departed the Growling Tigers' 2023 roster, with notable transfers by some of their blue chip recruits, and the consequent abandonment of the team by their foreign student-athlete.

This is it, this is the team (that I personally put together). Even after this season, this will be the roster that we'll have. We'll only be adding new players (to replace the outgoing seniors).

—Pido Jarencio, head coach

UST has struggled for the past three seasons since the Sorsogon bubble controversy that happened during the COVID-19 pandemic in 2020. The team has managed to win only six out of the 42 games that they played. The revamp of the roster was the result of a year-long transitional period, since returning coach Pido Jarencio inherited a lineup of players who were recruited during a series of rebuilding phases. The Tigers took their time in building a competitive team by scouting and recruiting players while the basketball tournament was still ongoing last season.

The official lineup for UST's 2024 campaign consisted of seven holdovers and nine new players, with two rookies, six transferees, and a new foreign student-athlete. Among the rookies are the 2023 NCAA Juniors MVP Amiel Acido, and Zain Mahmood, who was a member of the Under-16 national team that competed in the 2022 FIBA Asia Championship in Qatar. The two freshmen are both eligible for five playing years beginning in Season 87.

"I'm very excited to play for UST. It has been my dream since I was a kid to be able to play in the UAAP. I'm excited and very hungry to win while showcasing my talents."

—Amiel Acido

Acido was named the third best high school player for 2024 by the National Basketball Training Center, from being 11th in 2023. He averaged 17.7 points, 10.0 rebounds and 4.1 assists in 18 games while playing for the Perpetual Junior Altas. He was being recruited by former assistant coach McJour Luib to the UST Tiger Cubs' roster in 2020, before the pandemic, but chose to play for Perpetual after the bubble fiasco.

Mahmood, a 6-foot-7 Filipino-Canadian center with Pakistani roots, averaged 11.3 points and 5.8 rebounds in the six games that he played during the 2022 U-16 FIBA Asia Championship. He also played for the Fil-Nation Select team in the 2023 NBTC National Finals, where he averaged 6.8 points and 3.6 rebounds. He was recruited out of Maranatha High School in California, where he averaged 13.0 points, 4.4 rebounds and 1.6 assists in 20 games for the Minutemen as a high school senior.

Among the transferees are Forthsky Padrigao, a member of the Mythical five and champion team, the Ateneo Blue Eagles in 2022, and Filipino-Americans Kyle Paranada, Chase Lane, Leland Estacio, and Geremy Robinson.

Padrigao, the 11th ranked NBTC player in 2019, averaged 11.0 points, 4.4 rebounds, 5.5 assists and 2.4 steals per game in Season 85, earning for himself a runner-up finish to the MVP race.

Paranada averaged 11.6 points, 2.9 rebounds and 4.2 assists per game in Season 85 with the UE Red Warriors. He averaged 23.5 points per game in his senior high school year with the Montgomery Aztecs in San Diego.

Estacio, a transferee from West Valley College in California, averaged 3.6 points, 1.7 rebounds and 1.1 assists in 12 games playing as a sophomore for the Vikings. In the preseason, while completing his year-long residency with UST, Estacio earned the PinoyLiga Next Man Cup MVP honors.

Replacing Senegalese center Adama Faye as the team's foreign student-athlete is Malian Mo Tounkara. Tounkara, who was recruited by former Growling Tigers head coach Jino Manansala had played in numerous FIBA-sanctioned 3x3 tournaments in Mali. His Le Centre Mamoutou Kané de Kalabancoro (CMK) team placed third in the second leg of the Habib Sissoko 3x3 tournament in Bamako in October 2020. He was an alternate player of the U-19 Malian national team that competed in the 2021 FIBA World Cup in Latvia.

=== Departures ===
Pos.	No.	Nat.	Player	Height	Year	High school	Notes
SG	0	(Philippines)	Ivan Lazarte	6' 2"	3rd	Malayan High School of Science	Transferred to Mapúa University
SG	2	(Philippines)	Kylle Matthew Magdangal	5' 11"	3rd	Marina High School	Transferred to the University of Perpetual Help
C	3	(Philippines)	Prudencio Adrian Esmeña III	6' 6"	2nd	National University Nazareth School	Age ineligible
SF	8	(United States)	Vincent Gabriel Ventulan	6' 4"	5th	Fort Pierce Central High School	Graduated
SG	12	(Philippines)	Saentis James Moore	6' 1"	2nd	Arellano University High School	Transferred to College of Saint Benilde
SF	15	(Philippines)	Kenji Trey Duremdes	6' 3"	3rd	National University Nazareth School	Transferred to the University of Perpetual Help
PG	22	(Philippines)	Paul Matthew Manalang	5' 10"	4th	National University Nazareth School	Forwent eligibility to turn professional
C	23	(Senegal)	Adama Faye	6' 8"	3rd	Le Pionnier	Left the team midway in Season 86
SF	24	(Philippines)	Jonathan Ralf Gesalem	6' 1"	4th	Sacred Heart School-Ateneo de Cebu	Forwent eligibility to turn professional

=== Acquisitions ===
Pos.	No.	Nat.	Player	Height	Year	High school	Notes
SG	1	(United States)	Leland Reuben Estacio	6' 2"	3rd	Franklin High School	Transferred from West Valley College
PG	3	(United States)	Kyle Brandon Paranada	5' 9"	3rd	Montgomery High School	Transferred from the University of the East
PF	5	(United States)	Chase Lawrence Lane	6' 4"	5th	Covenant College Prep	Transferred from Claflin University
PG	11	(Philippines)	Rence Keith Sean Padrigao	5' 11"	3rd	Ateneo de Manila	Transferred from Ateneo de Manila
SF	12	(Philippines)	Glenn Isaac Danting	6' 3"	1st	University of the Assumption	Transferred from Ateneo de Manila
SG	20	(Philippines)	Leonardo Amiel Acido	6' 3"	1st	University of Perpetual Help	Rookie
C	21	(Canada)	Zain Mahmood	6' 7"	1st	Maranatha High School	Rookie
SG	23	(United States)	Geremy Jaylen Robinson Jr.	6' 1"	1st	Moanalua High School	Transferred from De La Salle University
C	36	(Mali)	Hinda Mady dit Mohamed Tounkara	6' 7"	1st	Lycée Public de Kalabancoro	Foreign student-athlete

=== Recruiting class ===
Name	Pos.	Height	High school	Hometown	Commit date	Ref.
Amiel Acido	SG	6' 3"	University of Perpetual Help	Antipolo	31 May 2024	
Amiel Acido	2023 NBTC Top 24 rank: 11 (All-Star game participant with Team Hustle)					
Amiel Acido	2023 SLAM Rising Stars Classic participant (with Team Hype)					
Amiel Acido	2024 NBTC Top 24 rank: 3 (All-Star game participant with Team Hustle)					
Forthsky Padrigao	PG	5' 11"	Ateneo de Manila	Zamboanga City	30 Sep 2023	
Forthsky Padrigao	2018 NBTC Top 24 rank: N/A (National Finals #1 seed, Division 1 quarterfinalist with Ateneo)					
Forthsky Padrigao	2019 NBTC Top 24 rank: 11 (National Finals #5 seed, Division 1 Round-of-16 participant with Ateneo; All-Star game participant with Team Hustle)					
Forthsky Padrigao	2019 SLAM Rising Stars Classic participant (with Team Hype)					
Forthsky Padrigao	2020 NBTC Top 24 rank: 15					
Zain Mahmood	C	6' 7"	Maranatha High School	Mississauga	23 Feb 2024	
Zain Mahmood	2023 NBTC Top 24 rank: N/A (National Finals #1 seed, Division 1 finalist with Fil-Nation Select)					
The National Basketball Training Center (NBTC) is a grassroots program in the Philippines that develops and ranks outstanding players from high schools who compete in a five month-long nationwide youth basketball tournament. The program has enabled local coaches to recruit skilled players to play collegiate basketball.
Since 2014, the SLAM Rising Stars Classic holds a yearly exhibition game that serves as a platform to showcase the talents of twenty-four of the best high school players from Metro Manila in front of coaches, scouts and media.

== Coaching staff ==
"We just want to keep things simple, while making sure that we execute well on both ends—and be able to maximize the talent that we have. The player that has the ball needs to be in a position where he can be a threat, where he can aggressively and easily attack while having the four other guys ready in their proper spots."

—Juno Sauler, UST assistant coach

Former La Salle head coach Juno Sauler joined the Tigers' bench as an assistant coach on January 10, 2024. He has been an assistant coach of the San Miguel teams, first with Barangay Ginebra, and presently with the Magnolia Hotshots in the PBA, since his tenure ended with the Green Archers in 2015. He was also the head coach of the La Salle women's team that won a three-peat from 1999 until 2001. He became the Archers' head coach in 2013 and led the team to the championship against UST on the same year.

"You know, we're not a strong team, but (in) bringing new coaches, everything got settled, and the players believed in the system, so we started winning."

—Alfrancis Chua, San Miguel sports director

Former PBA player and longtime San Miguel Beer assistant coach Peter Martin was also hired as deputy tactician. Alfrancis Chua, San Miguel Corporation's sports director and UST's Special Assistant to the Rector had revealed in an interview that he particularly instructed the inclusion of Sauler and Martin to the Tigers' coaching staff.

Assistant coach Lester del Rosario, meanwhile, was reported to have departed Jarencio's coaching staff in January.

== Schedule and results ==
=== Preseason tournaments ===
The Filoil EcoOil Preseason Cup games were aired via livestream on the Facebook pages of Filoil EcoOil Sports and Smart Sports, and Filoil EcoOil Sports' YouTube channel.

Preseason game log

2023–24 PinoyLiga Next Man Cup: 6–2
Game	Date • Time	Opponent	Result	Record	High points	High rebounds	High assists	Location
1	Nov 26 • 12:00 pm	Adamson Soaring Falcons	W 74–46	1–0	Robinson (15)	Tied (10)	Padrigao (7)	Enderun Gym Taguig
2	Jan 21 • 2:40 pm	Benilde Blazers	L 74–75	1–1	Tied (10)	Osang (16)	Padrigao (4)	Enderun Gym Taguig
3	Jan 27 • 1:50 pm	St. Dominic Pikemen	W 67–54	2–1	Estacio (22)	Osang (11)	Padrigao (8)	Enderun Gym Taguig
4	Feb 3 • 3:00 pm	De La Salle Green Archers	W 71–66	3–1	Danting (19)	Tounkara (6)	Estacio (5)	Enderun Gym Taguig
5	Feb 10 • 12:00 pm	San Beda Red Lions	W 94–90^{OT}	4–1	Tied (20)	Osang (7)	Estacio (7)	Enderun Gym Taguig
6	Feb 28 • 3:00 pm	Enderun Titans	W 78–72	5–1	Robinson (13)	Osang (10)	Padrigao (5)	Enderun Gym Taguig
7	Mar 10 • 3:00 pm	Enderun Titans; Quarterfinal game	W 59–46	6–1	Andrews (15)	Osang (14)	Padrigao (5)	Enderun Gym Taguig
8	Mar 17 • 4:00 pm	Benilde Blazers; Semifinal game	L 67–71	6–2	Estacio (24)	Tounkara (9)	Padrigao (4)	Enderun Gym Taguig

2024 Filoil EcoOil 17th Preseason Cup: 3–4
Game	Date • Time	Opponent	Result	Record	High points	High rebounds	High assists	Location
1	May 17 • 5:00 pm	De La Salle Green Archers	L 61–68	0–1	Cabañero (14)	Tounkara (9)	Padrigao (3)	Filoil EcoOil Centre San Juan
2	May 20 • 5:00 pm	UP Fighting Maroons	L 73–76	0–2	Estacio (16)	Tounkara (10)	Padrigao (6)	Filoil EcoOil Centre San Juan
3	May 22 • 1:00 pm	NU Bulldogs	W 76–75^{OT}	1–2	Cabañero (19)	Tounkara (14)	Paranada (5)	Filoil EcoOil Centre San Juan
4	May 27 • 1:00 pm	Ateneo Blue Eagles	W 63–52	2–2	Osang (16)	Osang (12)	Padrigao (6)	Filoil EcoOil Centre San Juan
5	Jun 1 • 9:00 am	UE Red Warriors	L 60–66	2–3	Crisostomo (12)	Osang (15)	Padrigao (3)	Filoil EcoOil Centre San Juan
6	Jun 5 • 5:00 pm	Adamson Soaring Falcons	W 58–54	3–3	Tounkara (15)	Tounkara (10)	Padrigao (2)	Filoil EcoOil Centre San Juan
7	Jun 6 • 1:00 pm	FEU Tamaraws	L 72–79	3–4	Cabañero (17)	Osang (14)	Tied (2)	Filoil EcoOil Centre San Juan

(#) Tournament seedings in parentheses.
All times are in UTC+08:00.

=== UAAP games ===
Elimination games were played in a double round-robin format and all of UST's games were televised on One Sports and the UAAP Varsity Channel, and livestreamed through the Pilipinas Live app.

UAAP Season 87 game log

Elimination round: 7–7
Game	Date • Time	Opponent	Result	Record	High points	High rebounds	High assists	Location
1	Sep 8 • 1:45 pm	UE Red Warriors	W 70–55	1–0	Cabañero (14)	Crisostomo (9)	Padrigao (7)	Araneta Coliseum Quezon City
2	Sep 11 • 7:34 pm	Ateneo Blue Eagles	W 74–64	2–0	Tied (16)	Tounkara (14)	Padrigao (9)	Araneta Coliseum Quezon City
3	Sep 15 • 3:40 pm	Adamson Soaring Falcons	L 56–69	2–1	Cabañero (16)	Crisostomo (6)	Padrigao (6)	Mall of Asia Arena Pasay
4	Sep 21 • 4:50 pm	NU Bulldogs	W 67–64	3–1	Tounkara (15)	Tounkara (10)	Padrigao (5)	Araneta Coliseum Quezon City
5	Sep 29 • 4:30 pm	De La Salle Green Archers	L 67–88	3–2	Cabañero (16)	Tounkara (5)	Padrigao (5)	Araneta Coliseum Quezon City
6	Oct 2 • 4:31 pm	UP Fighting Maroons	L 70–81	3–3	Tounkara (21)	Tied (6)	Padrigao (7)	Araneta Coliseum Quezon City
7	Oct 5 • 4:32 pm	FEU Tamaraws; End of R1 of eliminations	W 83–72	4–3	Tounkara (21)	Tounkara (17)	Padrigao (11)	Mall of Asia Arena Pasay
8	Oct 13 • 6:53 pm	UP Fighting Maroons	L 73–83	4–4	Tounkara (24)	Tied (9)	Padrigao (6)	Araneta Coliseum Quezon City
9	Oct 16 • 6:31 pm	De La Salle Green Archers	L 87–94^{OT}	4–5	Cabañero (23)	Cabañero (12)	Tied (3)	Mall of Asia Arena Pasay
10	Oct 19 • 12:43 pm	Ateneo Blue Eagles	L 64–67	4–6	Cabañero (18)	Crisostomo (16)	Padrigao (5)	Quadricentennial Pavilion, Manila
11	Oct 27 • 6:30 pm	FEU Tamaraws	W 79–70	5–6	Cabañero (16)	Tounkara (12)	Tied (3)	Mall of Asia Arena Pasay
12	Nov 6 • 6:30 pm	NU Bulldogs	L 62–67	5–7	Cabañero (19)	Tounkara (18)	Padrigao (7)	Mall of Asia Arena Pasay
13	Nov 9 • 6:36 pm	UE Red Warriors	W 76–67	6–7	Cabañero (27)	Tounkara (12)	Padrigao (6)	Araneta Coliseum Quezon City
14	Nov 16 • 6:31 pm	Adamson Soaring Falcons; End of R2 of eliminations	W 75–49	7–7	Acido (14)	Tounkara (14)	Tied (6)	Filoil EcoOil Centre San Juan

Final Four: 0–1
Game	Date • Time	Seed	Opponent	Result	Series	High points	High rebounds	High assists	Location
1	Nov 30 • 3:54 pm	(#3)	(#2) UP Fighting Maroons	L 69–78	0–1 (7–8)	Tied (12)	Tied (8)	Paranada (4)	Araneta Coliseum; Quezon City

(#) Tournament seedings in parentheses.
All times are in UTC+08:00.
Source: Imperium Technology

== UAAP statistics ==
=== Eliminations ===
Player	GP	GS	MPG	FGM	FGA	FG%	3PM	3PA	3P%	FTM	FTA	FT%	RPG	APG	SPG	BPG	TOV	PPG
Nic Cabañero	14	11	30.0	83	199	41.7	13	62	21.0	49	80	61.3	5.4	1.9	0.9	0.1	1.3	16.3
Mo Tounkara	13	13	28.6	72	157	45.9	12	37	32.4	24	36	66.7	10.2	1.0	0.5	0.8	2.6	13.8
Forthsky Padrigao	14	13	27.2	45	146	30.8	22	97	22.7	11	18	61.1	3.3	6.1	1.5	0.0	2.9	8.8
Christian Manaytay	14	5	21.6	42	94	44.7	8	22	36.4	25	34	73.5	4.0	1.2	0.9	0.2	2.1	8.4
Kyle Paranada	14	0	11.4	24	56	42.9	15	35	42.9	8	15	53.3	1.1	2.1	0.4	0.0	1.4	5.1
Gelo Crisostomo	14	9	19.1	26	58	44.8	3	11	27.3	9	13	69.2	6.9	0.6	0.4	0.9	0.7	4.6
Amiel Acido	14	0	9.9	16	51	31.4	12	39	30.8	5	7	71.4	1.9	0.8	0.3	0.1	0.4	3.5
Mark Llemit	14	3	15.1	15	49	30.6	8	24	33.3	10	18	55.6	2.7	1.1	0.8	0.1	0.6	3.4
Ice Danting	9	8	8.1	7	15	46.7	5	12	41.7	3	6	50.0	1.2	0.0	0.3	0.0	0.4	2.4
Migs Pangilinan	14	1	9.0	8	32	25.0	8	30	26.7	5	7	71.4	1.3	0.4	0.3	0.1	0.7	2.1
Geremy Robinson	10	2	9.8	7	22	31.8	1	8	12.5	6	11	54.5	1.7	0.8	0.3	0.0	0.4	2.1
Chase Lane	10	5	7.3	6	15	40.0	2	7	28.6	6	8	75.0	0.8	0.4	0.3	0.0	0.3	2.0
Leland Estacio	13	0	9.2	7	26	26.9	4	21	19.0	1	1	100.0	1.2	0.9	0.4	0.1	0.6	1.5
Echo Laure	8	0	3.6	4	9	44.4	0	0	0.0	0	0	0.0	1.1	0.1	0.0	0.0	0.1	1.0
Ivanne Calum	5	0	4.8	1	3	33.3	0	1	0.0	0	0	0.0	1.2	0.4	0.4	0.0	0.0	0.4
Zain Mahmood	7	0	3.9	1	4	25.0	0	1	0.0	0	0	0.0	0.7	0.0	0.1	0.0	0.3	0.3
Total	14		40.4	364	936	38.9	113	407	27.8	162	254	63.8	42.7	16.9	7.1	2.4	14.7	71.6
Opponents	14		40.4	351	912	38.5	109	363	30.0	179	264	67.8	43.4	16.0	6.1	3.4	15.1	70.7

=== Playoffs ===
Player	GP	GS	MPG	FGM	FGA	FG%	3PM	3PA	3P%	FTM	FTA	FT%	RPG	APG	SPG	BPG	TOV	PPG
Kyle Paranada	1	0	24.1	4	9	44.4	2	5	40.0	2	2	100.0	2	4	0	0	0	12
Nic Cabañero	1	1	29.6	4	13	30.8	1	2	50.0	3	4	75.0	3	1	0	0	2	12
Gelo Crisostomo	1	0	18.1	6	9	66.7	0	1	0.0	0	0	0.0	7	0	0	1	0	12
Christian Manaytay	1	1	27.1	4	12	33.3	2	6	33.3	0	2	0.0	8	2	0	1	1	10
Mo Tounkara	1	1	27.6	4	12	33.3	0	2	0.0	0	2	0.0	8	1	0	1	1	8
Forthsky Padrigao	1	1	25.5	2	8	25.0	1	6	16.7	2	4	50.0	0	3	0	0	1	7
Amiel Acido	1	0	17.3	1	2	50.0	1	2	50.0	0	0	0.0	3	2	1	0	1	3
Migs Pangilinan	1	0	5.5	1	3	33.3	1	3	33.3	0	0	0.0	2	0	0	0	1	3
Mark Llemit	1	0	13.2	1	2	50.0	0	1	0.0	0	2	0.0	1	0	0	1	1	2
Leland Estacio	1	0	6.4	0	0	0.0	0	0	0.0	0	0	0.0	1	1	0	0	0	0
Ice Danting	1	1	3.9	0	1	0.0	0	1	0.0	0	0	0.0	3	0	0	0	0	0
Echo Laure	1	0	1.7	0	0	0.0	0	0	0.0	0	0	0.0	0	0	0	0	0	0
Total	1		40.0	27	71	38.0	8	29	27.6	7	16	43.8	41	14	1	4	9	69
Opponents	1		40.0	27	68	39.7	6	26	23.1	18	26	69.2	51	16	5	6	9	78

Legend
GP	Games played	GS	Games started	MPG	Minutes per game
FGM	Field-goal made	FGA	Field-goal attempts	FG%	Field-goal percentage
3PM	3-point field-goal made	3PA	3-point field-goal attempts	3P%	3-point field-goal percentage
FTM	Free-throw made	FTA	Free-throw attempts	FT%	Free-throw percentage
RPG	Rebounds per game	APG	Assists per game	SPG	Steals per game
BPG	Blocks per game	TOT	Turnovers per game	PPG	Points per game

Source: Imperium Technology

== Summary of games ==
Despite a consensus among sports analysts that last year's finalists, La Salle and UP would once again dominate the tournament this season, SPIN.ph has tabbed UST, along with UE and NU as contenders, aside from the top two UAAP teams. The Growling Tigers, in particular, bring with them much anticipation, due to the recruitment of their blue chip players in the offseason. Transferees Padrigao, Paranada, Lane, Estacio, Robinson, and Ice Danting had a full year of training together and have familiarized themselves with each other during that period.

"Not just one, two, or three wins—no. For us, we are up there (with the contenders). We are aiming for the Final Four, that is our primary goal. And then, we'll see, maybe we can make it to the Finals."

—Pido Jarencio

Expectations among the team and the UST community were high, that Jarencio projected a Final Four finish for the Tigers. UST ended last season at last place with only two wins. It was a period of transition, where his recruits needed to establish their one-year residencies first. Jarencio's coaching system also took time for players to adjust to, since the team has undergone three coaching changes in the post-pandemic era.

"I'm super eager to play. I had to sit out one full year and it was kind of depressing to just watch all of them struggle last season and not be able to help. So, I'm super eager to play this season."

—Kyle Paranada

"I'm happy with my new teammates. They showed their skills in every practice and during our offseason games. I'd like to thank them for choosing UST, and knowing their roles, I know that they can produce for the team."

—Nic Cabañero

Cabañero, the league's scoring leader for the past two seasons, will finally get the much-needed support from his new teammates. Having Padrigao and Paranada, two of the league's best guards from Season 85 solves the team's ball handling and playmaking problems, something that the Tigers experienced in the past seasons and even saw Cabañero taking on the point guard duties at times.

=== First round ===
UE Red Warriors

	1	2	3	4	Total
UST	18	18	14	20	70
UE	8	11	16	20	55

The Growling Tigers showcased their overhauled roster on the opening day of the basketball tournament with a 15-point, 70–55 win over the UE Red Warriors. With the score tied at 6–all in the first quarter, UST went on a 25–7 run that lasted until the middle of the second period. UE's Welo Lingolingo scored four straight points to stop the rally, but Cabañero was able to answer with a three-point shot to put the Tigers ahead at 36–19 at the end of the half. The Warriors made some runs but went unsuccessful in trimming down UST's double-digit leads.

Mo Tounkara made heads turn with his all-around game, earning for himself the match's Best Player recognition. The selection of the team's foreign student-athlete was made only three days prior to the start of the UAAP season. Aside from the Malian Tounkara, Nigeria's Peter Osang was also a member of UST's training pool, and both players have shown the skills deserving of a spot in the roster. But with only one FSA allowed by the league, the choice went to Tounkara, who scored 13 points, on 6-of-9 shooting against the Warriors.

Cabañero received ample scoring support from his teammates, but still came out leading them with 14 points. Padrigao and Paranada had a lot to do with the balanced scoring with their combined 12 assists. It was a total team effort as the Tigers recorded 24 assists, doubling UE's total of 12 in the game. UST's defense was also able to limit their opponents to only 16 field goals.

	1	2	3	4	Total
Ateneo	19	22	11	12	64
UST	18	19	18	19	74

Ateneo Blue Eagles

UST defeated the Ateneo Blue Eagles for the first time in nine years, breaking a 17-match losing streak against them after winning, 74–64 on September 11.

The Tigers relied on a steady fourth-quarter effort to overcome their opponents' 8–3 run at the start of the period. Tounkara spearheaded UST's counterattack with their own 16–0 run to flip Ateneo's four-point lead to their advantage at 72–60. The Eagles were held scoreless for seven minutes, until Sean Quitevis made both his free throws with under a minute left in the game.

It was another game for the Tigers where they shared the ball effectively, combining for a total of 22 assists. Padrigao had a game-high 9 dimes, as Cabañero added 4 of his own. UST was also able to limit their errors with only 7 turnovers in the game.

Tounkara and Gelo Crisostomo both finished for the Tigers with double-doubles, as both scored 16 points, with the Malian collaring 14 rebounds, and the sophomore forward getting 10 of his own. Cabañero and Mark Llemit also finished in double digits with 11 and 10 points respectively.

	1	2	3	4	Total
Adamson	13	20	19	17	69
UST	20	12	6	18	56

Adamson Soaring Falcons

The Adamson Soaring Falcons dealt UST their first loss in three games, as they pulled away from a close first half to end the game at 69–56. The Tigers, trailing 32–33 at the half, opened a 5–0 rally led by Cabañero to start the third period. It was then when Adamson's Joshua Yerro hit a floater to tie the game at 37–all. It was enough to spark a scoring blitz as former Tiger Royce Mantua made a three-pointer to cap their 19–6 run and gave their team a 17-point lead heading into the final period. UST could not get their groove going as they watched their deficit increase to 20 at 47–67, late in the game. Cabañero was the only player who scored in double digits for the Tigers with 16 points, that included three three-pointers. Padrigao made six out of the team's total 17 assists.

	1	2	3	4	Total
UST	16	16	16	19	67
NU	16	18	18	12	64

NU Bulldogs

The Growling Tigers relied on a gutsy step-back jumper from veteran point guard Forthsky Padrigao in the last 30 seconds to escape with a 67–64 win over the NU Bulldogs. They were trailing, 53–60 midway in the final period, when Cabañero converted on a basket to begin an 8–0 run. The Bulldogs' Steve Nash Enriquez split his charities to tie the game at 61–all, but Cabañero was able to hit a three to give UST back the lead. NU was able to tie again after Jolo Manansala made his own three, off the backboard. It was then that Padrigao, finding himself across NU's 6-foot-5 Kenshin Padrones off a switch, made the surprising jump shot for the lead.

"It just happened, because I've been creating plays for my teammates the past possessions, but in that last play they (NU) suddenly switched defenders, so I put up that shot and thankfully it went in."

—Forthsky Padrigao

Tounkara finished with another double-double of 15 points and 10 rebounds. Cabañero added 14 points, and Christian Manaytay, despite committing a game-high 6 turnovers, was able to finish with 10 points to help the team notch the win.

	1	2	3	4	Total
La Salle	19	17	25	27	88
UST	18	12	22	15	67

De La Salle Green Archers

UST suffered a 21-point blowout loss at the hands of the De La Salle Green Archers. The Tigers were in control at the start the game, leading 9–2, but the Archers erupted with a 17–9 rally to wrest the lead at the end of the quarter at 19–18. UST could not keep up with La Salle's dominance inside the paint and caused their players, particularly, Tounkara to end up in foul trouble. The Malian big man had to sit out for long stretches and was limited to playing for only 20 minutes. The Tigers committed a total of 22 team fouls, giving their opponents 28 bonus shots against only 9 for their team. They were also outrebounded, as a result of avoiding more contact, 29–56.

Trailing by only six points at the half, UST was again subjected to an 11–4 run, allowing La Salle to pull away at 47–34. A couple of rallies by the Tigers narrowed down the opponents' lead by seven, but the Archers' firepower was too much that they ended up getting outscored in the final period at 27–15.

Cabañero led the team in scoring with 16 points on a 7-of-11 field goal. Padrigao, making four three-pointers in the game, finished with a season-high 15 points. Amiel Acido, who contributed 9 points, was also able to make three three-point shots, as he and Llemit pulled the Tigers to within seven, at 52–59 late in the third period.

	1	2	3	4	Total
UP	16	24	28	13	81
UST	23	19	21	7	70

UP Fighting Maroons

The Growling Tigers had looked to snap UP's unbeaten 5–0 record with a strong start. Tounkara scored 11 of his game-high 21 points in the first quarter to tow his team to a 23–16 lead. The Maroons found their stride and began to stage a comeback in the middle of the second period, with Quentin Millora-Brown and Francis Lopez spearheading the rally. They finally overtook the Tigers when UP's Harold Alarcon sparked a 10–0 run in the second half, coupled with their suffocating defense on UST to cause them to miss their own baskets. Manaytay converted on an undergoal layup to start the fourth period, but his team would proceed to suffer from a six-minute drought, until Cabañero's free throws put a stop to it at the 2:37 mark. Tounkara suffered a sprained ankle after landing on the foot of UP's Terrence Fortea and had to sit out for majority of the period. The Tigers ended up getting outscored, 28–41.

Three players ended up scoring in double digits for the Tigers, as Cabañero and Padrigao finished with 15 and 14 to add to Tounkara's near-perfect 9-of-10 field goal shooting. Padrigao dished out a total of 7 assists, but committed 7 of the team's total 24 turnovers.

"The players responded to Coach Gold during half time. After allowing 23 points in the first quarter alone, they were able to limit them to 28 in the entire second half. This was a tough UST team, obviously, much better compared to the last season."

—Christian Luanzon, UP assistant coach

	1	2	3	4	Total
UST	19	15	25	24	83
FEU	15	17	19	21	72

FEU Tamaraws

UST ended the first round with a win over the FEU Tamaraws and have already doubled their total wins from last year's entire campaign. Padrigao fueled the drive, dishing out a league-best of 11 assists, on top of his 14 markers. Two of Padrigao's total assists were made during the last two minutes, while the Tigers were keeping the Tamaraws at bay. FEU had threatened, chopping the lead down to five, at 75–70, when the veteran point guard executed a perfect inbound pass to a driving Cabañero for the basket. This was followed by a dish to Tounkara who converted and increased their lead to nine. Five players scored in double figures, while limiting their turnovers to just seven for the second time in the season.

"That was the key to our game, because in the past two games, our assist-to-turnover ratio was high, so we had to make adjustments. We were at our best when we share the ball."

—Forthsky Padrigao

Tounkara, like Padrigao, also had a double-double of 21 points and 17 rebounds, on a 9-of-18 field goal shooting. The Tigers had more shot opportunities, outnumbering their opponents, 83–67, and were also able to outrebound FEU, 54–42.

=== Second round ===
The Growling Tigers ended the first round of eliminations with a 4–3 record, their best start in the post-pandemic era. Two of UST's losses came from Season 86 finalists La Salle and UP. While the Tigers kept it close, the Archers and Maroons pulled away late to win by double digits. In their game against UP, they led for three quarters before the Maroons made a 21–4 run, exposing fatigue on the team's starters. UST has added new talents this year, but the depth of their bench has not been seen in a lot of their games, as they ended the first round having the worst record of only 22.6 bench points. The coaching staff will have to figure out the right combination of players to field in the next round, along with strengthening their game plan on rebounding and defense.

"I think it's really with the reps, because even during our first three games, where my percentages were bad, I still did my reps. As Coach Tab (Baldwin) said, 'you won't know when it will pay dividends,' so that's what I did."

—Forthsky Padrigao

Padrigao has shown his elite-level playmaking, despite taking some time to adjust in his new team. He was finally able to score in double digits after three games, where he previously averaged only 4.3 points on a 20 percent field goal shooting. The next games saw him finishing with 15, 14, and 14 points.

"We really prepared for those two teams (UP and La Salle), but then we came up short. We're still far from where we want to be. Hopefully, we can address the problems during the one-week break heading into the second round, where we could be better prepared when we face the two teams again."

—Forthsky Padrigao

Reflecting on their losses, Padrigao pointed out that among their weak points were their turnovers, where the Tigers averaged 14 in the first round. Padrigao himself had the highest in the team with 3.7 turnovers per game.

With the Tigers' individual performances, Tounkara and Cabañero were just behind La Salle's Kevin Quiambao in scoring with 14.0 and 13.6 points per game. Padrigao led the league in assists with 7.2 per game.

	1	2	3	4	Total
UP	18	25	16	24	83
UST	17	26	19	11	73

UP Fighting Maroons

A late-game comeback by the UP Fighting Maroons resulted to a ten-point, 73–83 loss for the Growling Tigers. UST was leading through three quarters, and was up by three at 62–59 going into the final ten minutes of the game. The Maroons, however, found their offensive rebounding going and were able to score their second-chance points, as they ended up outscoring the Tigers, 24-11 in the fourth period. Padrigao shot a three-pointer to give his team a four-point cushion at 65–61, before UP erupted for a four-minute 16–2 rally, beginning at the eighth minute mark.

"I believe the team in a way, like during the first half, I think we've been forcing UST to miss shots most of the time—but then, we were able to control our offensive rebounds, so I think the team really worked together in the second half."

—Goldwin Monteverde, UP head coach

The game saw six ties and eight lead changes, with UP operating in the paint to outscore UST, 34–28. The Tigers' on-point three-point shooting was what kept them in the game, but when UP overtook the lead, the Tigers went on to take poor shot selections, which resulted to 55 missed attempts, even as they had more chances to score. They had 77 field goal attempts, while the Maroons only had 59.

Tounkara led in scoring with a season-high of 24 points. Cabañero and Manaytay added 17 and 12 points, respectively.

	1	2	3	4	OT	Total
UST	14	15	27	24	7	87
La Salle	27	15	23	15	14	94

De La Salle Green Archers

La Salle averted a 20-point collapse against a comebacking UST as they escaped with a 94–87 overtime win. The Tigers fell prey to the Archers' 14–0 opening run, and had to play catch up for majority of the game. They were able to erase the La Salle's 74–61 lead with a 19–6 rally with four minutes gone in the fourth period. Paranada hit a three-pointer, followed by a Cabañero basket on a fast break, pulling UST to within one, at 79–80, with 52 seconds left. Padrigao was sent to the free throw line after an unsportsmanlike foul was called on the Archers' Mike Phillips at the 24-second mark. The veteran point guard, however, could only manage to split his charities, bringing the score to 80–all. With the ball still in their possession, UST made two bad plays with poorly-executed three-point attempts, the second coming from Padrigao in the closing seconds, sending the game into overtime.

"I think the lesson we learned is that we need to execute our system from the first to the fourth quarter, because the game doesn't end after the third. After that, we relaxed a bit, and Coach (Topex) reminded us that UST could come back, so we needed to be prepared."

—Kevin Quiambao, La Salle forward

"We were not surprised about how UST played. We always remind ourselves that every team will be out competing against us. Coach Pido and the rest of the staff are really doing a tremendous job in making sure they're a competitive group."

—Topex Robinson, La Salle head coach

One of the things that the Tigers had going for them was how they forced the Archers to commit 26 turnovers, allowing themselves to post a league-best team total of 15 steals in the game. UST, however, was unable to score in the first four minutes of the overtime period. La Salle's Quiambao and Phillips took over as their team held the Tigers at bay with a seven-point, 89-81 lead, going into the final three minutes. The extra period had turned into a free throw shooting contest, as team foul penalties were carried over from the fourth quarter. The Archers were making their foul shots, while UST struggled to convert theirs. Paranada, in particular missed both charities as the Tigers could only make one of the team's four attempts. La Salle, in contrast, made all seven free throws.

UST has suffered back-to-back losses in the second round and are now under .500 with a 4–5 record. They have not defeated La Salle since the second round of the 2015 season.

Cabañero led four players in double-digit scoring with a double-double of 23 points and a season-high of 12 rebounds. Tounkara earlier got ejected from the game with 3:28 left in the fourth quarter after incurring a second technical foul for taunting gestured on two La Salle players.

	1	2	3	4	Total
UST	8	17	16	23	64
Ateneo	17	16	15	19	67

Ateneo Blue Eagles

"I don't know the last time a team had to play a road game in the UAAP, and it was a mystery to us why it had to happen."

—Tab Baldwin, Ateneo head coach

Ateneo negated UST's home court advantage with a 67–64 victory at the Quadricentennial Pavilion on October 19. Since 2022, the UAAP has held basketball games at the Growling Tigers' gym whenever the Araneta Coliseum and the Mall of Asia Arena both become unavailable due to booking conflicts. UST has not played any UAAP games at the said venue prior to their match against the Blue Eagles.

"I take the blame for this loss, as one of the seniors of our team. I hope that we get another chance to make it up to the (UST) community, knowing this was our only game here at QPav. We will try to make up for it (the loss), it's not the end of the season yet."

—Nic Cabañero

The Tigers had missed the services of Tounkara, who had served a one-game suspension from incurring two technical fouls in their previous game. The game began with Ateneo speeding off to a 17–4 run, as UST played catch up for almost the entire match. They had come within two in the last 16.6 seconds, at 62–64, but a turnover by Padrigao resulted to a basket by the Eagles' Quitevis, extending the lead to four. Paranada answered with a lay-in, after which, they fouled Ateneo's Ian Espinosa to stop the clock. Espinosa split his free throws. Down 64–67, UST had the chance to equalize, but Ateneo's Chris Koon was able to steal off Manaytay after an errant pass as the game clock expired. The Tigers have now lost three straight games with a 4–6 record.

Cabañero led in scoring with 18 points, as Crisostomo, playing longer minutes in Tounkara's absence, added 16 and collared a season-high 16 rebounds, on top of 3 shot blocks.

	1	2	3	4	Total
FEU	13	16	14	27	70
UST	16	16	18	29	79

FEU Tamaraws

"The boys worked hard to get the win today. The only thing in our minds these last four games is to survive, with a do-or-die mindset."

—Pido Jarencio

The Tigers' aspiration for a Final Four berth had a resurgence with their second-round win over the FEU Tamaraws, while also ending their three-game losing streak. They were also able to stop FEU's two-game winning streak, even as Tamaraw rookie VJ Pre scored 31 points. Tounkara's return to the roster was evident as he finished with another double-double of 11 points and 12 rebounds, on top of two shot blocks.

	1	2	3	4	Total
UST	12	24	19	7	62
NU	19	15	13	20	67

NU Bulldogs

UST lost steam in the fourth quarter, resulting to a 62-67 loss against the NU Bulldogs. They were leading at 55–47 at the end of the third period, but NU went on a six-minute, 17–3 run to take the lead at 64–58. The Tigers would go on to score just two points, on a 2-of-16 clip in the next ten minutes, as both teams struggled to convert. Paranada shot a three-pointer in the last three minutes to pull his team to within three, but the Bulldogs were able to keep them at bay with their free throw shooting. They ended up making 3-of-4 charities for the win. In the end, UST's poor shooting resulted to a low 7-point fourth quarter output.

Tounkara had another double-double of 15 points and a season-high 18 rebounds. Cabañero added 19 points to lead his team in scoring. The Tigers have now lost four of their last five games and had slid down to a 5–7 record.

	1	2	3	4	Total
UST	22	26	12	16	76
UE	11	17	17	22	67

UE Red Warriors

The Tigers kept their Final Four hopes alive with a 76–67 win over the UE Red Warriors. They began the game with a 15–5 run, with Tounkara scoring three straight baskets. Another 20–3 run to start the second quarter propelled UST to a 41–14 lead. The Warriors made some stops and outscored the Tigers, 14–7 to trim down the lead at halftime, at 28–48. They also outscored UST, 17–12 in the third period, but the Tigers went on another run in the final quarter to increase their lead from 15 to 27. It was in this stretch when UE's Precious Momowei was ejected from the game after incurring a second unsportsmanlike foul. Momowei had caused injuries to UST's players, with his elbow inadvertently landing on Tounkara and Crisostomo on separate plays.

The Warriors made a late-game rally, chopping down UST's lead to just five, after a 14–2 run in the final three minutes. Cabañero bailed the Tigers after scoring a three-point play for the win. He led the team with 27 points, on an 8-of-16 shooting. 19 of his total points were scored in the first half. Crisostomo and Manaytay added 14 and 10 points, respectively, while Tounkara contributed 12 rebounds. The Tigers are now just half a game behind the third-seeded Warriors, with only a game remaining in the elimination rounds.

	1	2	3	4	Total
Adamson	18	10	4	17	49
UST	16	13	23	23	75

Adamson Soaring Falcons

The Tigers qualified to the Final Four for the first time in five years after a dominant, 75–49 win against the Adamson Soaring Falcons. UST needed a strong second half outing to shake off their resilient opponents, who had threatened to within one after Mantua shot a three-pointer at the end of the first twenty minutes of the game.

Rookie Amiel Acido, coming off the bench, led UST to a six-minute 19–0 run for a 21-point, 52–31 lead. The Falcons had kept up for the first three minutes of the third quarter, with Adamson's Mathew Montebon firing a three of his own to pull his team within two, at 31–33. It would prove to be their last act of resistance as the Tigers held them to only four points in the quarter. UST's run continued to the final period, scoring 24 more points against the Falcon's 9, behind a steady three-point shooting from their players. Their lead went up to as high as 27 points, at 67–40, with Paranada converting one from beyond the arc in the final 44 seconds. Besides their strong offense, the Tigers were also able to limit Adamson to a game-low of 16 field goals.

The win marked the end of the elimination rounds assignment for UST, where they finished at a .500 record of 7–7, and assured themselves of a solo third seeding going into the semifinal round. Acido, who played his best game of the season, led the Tigers with 14 points, anchored on four three-pointers and a near-perfect 5-of-6 field goal. Eight of his total point output were scored in the third quarter. The team made a total of 13 three-point shots, with Paranada and Crisostomo contributing three apiece. Tounkara had another double-double of 11 points and 14 rebounds, on top of 3 shot blocks. Cabañero, who was six points shy of a third-straight scoring title, finished with 13 points and 8 rebounds. Crisostomo added 11 rebounds, while Padrigao and Paranada each made 6 assists.

=== Final Four ===
UP Fighting Maroons

	1	2	3	4	Total
UST	14	21	15	19	69
UP	16	17	24	21	78

UST lost their Final Four match against the second-seeded UP Fighting Maroons, 69–78. Faced with a twice-to-win disadvantage, the Tigers set the pace in the first half, as they led, 35–33 going into the break. Meeting for the third time this season, UST had always led in the early part, only to be overtaken by UP in the second half. In this semifinal game, the Maroons went on a 21–4 scoring barrage to turn the Tigers' 40–34 lead to their advantage, giving UP their biggest lead of the game at 11, at 55–44. The Maroons' Alarcon led the second-half uprising as he scored 14 of his 16 points in the said period. UST ended up getting outscored, 15–24 going into the last 10 minutes of the game, as their opponents took full control until the end.

"As for us, we already expected this to be a tough game against UST. The way they ran their program this season, and as the tournament progressed, we saw that they were improving a lot. On our end, what's important for us right now was the way we responded to our shortcomings on offense in the first half."

—Goldwin Monteverde

Cabañero, Padrigao, and Paranada conspired to bring UST to within five, at 61–66 in the last 5:29, before allowing the Maroons to score six straight points. To compound their woes, Padrigao was ejected from the game with 3:24 left after he was called for a second unsportsmanlike foul while guarding UP's Millora-Brown. Manaytay brought the lead down to eight, at 64–72 with a three-pointer in the last 2:35, but the Maroons made another six-point run, leaving UST behind in their trail. Paranada, Cabañero, and Crisostomo scored 12 points apiece, as Manaytay, playing his last game as a Growling Tiger, added 10 points and 8 rebounds.

"We'll just have to charge this (loss) to experience, because the reality is, only Forthsky has experienced playing in the Final four. This was all new to the other players. But we gave them (UP) a great game. I'm just glad to see the boys go out there and fight. What's important is that the kids followed our plays. We were missing our free throws, we also gave them second chance points, and then the Alarcon guy got going. We have to give it up to UP."

—Pido Jarencio

Despite not making it all the way to the championship, the Growling Tigers have already surpassed all three of their past post-pandemic season performances this year. Their seven wins in the elimination rounds have outnumbered the combined 6–36 record from Seasons 84 to 86, and after making it to the Final Four for the first time since 2019 as the third-seeded team, a repeat for the next coming seasons is not far-fetched. The system that the coaching staff began putting in place last year is now up and running with San Miguel Corporation's continued backing and the quality of players coming in from their recruitment. Since assuming the position as envoy between San Miguel and the UST management, Alfrancis Chua has promised to deliver results for the basketball program and make them constant contenders for the coming seasons.

"I'm happy—very happy, actually. I promised (our) rector and the priests that I'm going to bring them to the Final Four. It was difficult, but we were able to accomplish it. I am happy for the players and the coaches."

—Alfrancis Chua

Earning a third seeding in the Final Four was indeed, difficult. Their three-game losing streak in the second round made the task improbable. They struggled defensively, having the second-worst defensive rating of 71.8 points in every 100 possessions was proof. They were most vulnerable when guarding pick-and-rolls by the opposing teams, where they allowed the third-highest points made by the ball handler as a result of late closeouts by their defenders. The Tigers, however, displayed promise on their offensive end, earning a league-best rating of 71.6 points in every 100 possessions.

Like in the first round, UST's starters had the lion's share of minutes played, owing to their bench's inability to create opportunitues for scoring. The coaching staff seemed to experiment on their rotations, where Cabañero and Padrigao had games as non-starters, often resulting to unfamiliarity and disruption of plays. Tounkara's suspension during their second-round game against Ateneo also proved to be a factor to their three-game collapse.

The pressure was on for team captain Nic Cabañero. The games were winding down and with UST's record of under .500 at 5–7, they were in danger of missing the playoffs. The Tigers delivered. Cabañero dished out his best game of the season with a personal best of 27 points, mostly from frequent attacks to the basket. Their final elimination game against Adamson was a total team effort, where they orchestrated a 23–4 third quarter scoring for a decisive win. Cabañero has finally proven his worth as the current King Tiger. His per-game averages of 16.3 points, 5.4 rebounds, 1.9 assists, and a true-shooting-percentage of 48.7% is testament to his versatility worthy of a spot in the Mythical team. His ability to finish while running to the basket has ranked him first among all UAAP players with a 51% accuracy, though he fell short of claiming a third consecutive scoring title, yielding to eventual MVP Kevin Quiambao, who averaged 16.6 points per game this season.

The team would not be where they are without the all-around games of Padrigao and Tounkara. UST's offense depended on Padrigao's direction, as evidenced by his league-best 6.1 assists per game, out of the total 85 assists that he dished out this season. His most notable game was when he compiled a season high of 11 assists in their game against FEU on October 5. Tounkara provided the inside presence that the Tigers lacked last season, where his double-double of 10.2 rebounds and 13.8 points per game kept the team abreast with the other strong contenders. He was ranked seventh in the MVP race at the end of eliminations, with 60.2 statistical points. He was also the fourth best rebounder, behind fellow FSA's Mo Konateh and Precious Momowei, and La Salle's Mike Phillips. Padrigao was ranked eighth in the MVP tally, with 58.7 statistical points, while also ranking third in steals behind UP's JD Cagulangan and Phillips.

As the Tigers' season came to a close, Pido Jarencio expressed his optimism for the team's future.

"I believe that we are going to be stronger next year, as long as we get our players ready for the next season, since our recruitment system has already been put in place. We are on the right track. Just keep in mind that the results that we want will not come instantly, not especially in this era of basketball, which has greatly changed. Everything about college basketball seems to have developed. The competition has levelled up. But with our team, we only need to remain consistent, and then the program just has to maintain its continuity. Let's see how we fare next year. Forthsky is still with us, Nic too. Kyle Paranada, also. They are all still there, which is why the team is still intact, somehow."

—Pido Jarencio

"The one thing that I always remember is how fans kept saying that I'm just a good player in a bad team."

—Nic Cabañero

"I'm one hundred percent sure that I want to play for UST (next season), especially, since we are the season hosts. But I'm still going to talk to them (Coach Pido and the coaching staff) before I go home to Inabanga (Bohol) this December."

—Nic Cabañero

Cabañero, in an interview, said he wants another crack at the Final Four next season. He is set to graduate from his academics this school year, but has stated that he wanted to return for his final year of eligibility. After enduring years of losses, he has finally tasted what it was like to be in the playoffs, as well as in the Mythical team. He has been through three years of rebuilding and the same number of coaching changes, but the one thing that stuck to his mind was the criticism that he often received from fans, that despite his high-scoring performances, he could not lift his team past the losses. He can now put those negative remarks to rest, as the Growling Tigers have returned to their winning ways.

== Awards ==
Name	Award	Date	Ref.
Team	UAAP 2nd runner-up trophy	15 Dec 2024	
Nic Cabañero	UAAP Mythical team	11 Dec 2024	
Amiel Acido	UAAP Player of the Week	16–23 Nov 2024	
Leland Estacio	PinoyLiga MVP, Mythical team	23 Mar 2024	

== Players drafted into the PBA ==
Christian Manaytay was picked tenth overall in the first round of the 2025 PBA draft by the Yeng Guiao-led Rain or Shine Elasto Painters on September 7, 2025. Geremy Robinson, meanwhile, was ruled ineligible for UST's 2025 UAAP campaign due to academic deficiencies and chose to join the same draft instead. He was selected in the eighth round by the Converge FiberXers as the 70th overall pick.

Year	Player	Round	Pick	Overall	PBA team
2025	Christian Manaytay	1	10	10	Rain or Shine Elasto Painters
2025	Geremy Robinson	8	4	70	Converge FiberXers
