= 2025 Unrivaled 1 on 1 Tournament =

American basketball tournament

- City: Miami, Florida
- Dates: February 10–14, 2025

Final positions
- Champions: Napheesa Collier
- Runners-up: Aaliyah Edwards
- Semifinalists: Azurá Stevens; Arike Ogunbowale

Official website
- Website

The 2025 Unrivaled 1 on 1 Tournament was the inaugural mid-season one-on-one single-elimination tournament for the Unrivaled basketball league during the 2025 Unrivaled season.

== Overview ==
The tournament took place from February 10–14, 2025, with the winner earning a $200,000 paycheck. (Note: Ahead of the 2025 season, the league had originally reported the winner of the tournament would receive a $250,000 prize.) In January 2025, Sprite was named the presenting partner of 2025 1 on 1 tournament. The runner-up of the tournament will earn $50,000 and the remaining two semi-finalists, 25,000 each. Additionally, all clubmates of the winner will earn $10,000 each.

== Rules ==
All games for the one-on-one tournament were played with a continuous clock to a winning score of 11 points or to 10 minutes in length, whichever occurs first. The shot clock was set at seven seconds with players earning next possession after each made shot (also known as make it, take it or winner's ball).

In the quarterfinals, one 30-second timeout per player was permitted. The final format was best-of-three games with a winning score of just 8 points or to 10 minutes in length, whichever occurs first, for all games.

== Bracket creation ==
From January 30 to February 2, 2025, fans were able to vote for any of the 30 players to determine their seedings within pods for the first round.

The first round began on February 10 and consist of fourteen single-elimination 1-on-1 games across two televised sessions, with the top seeds in Pods A and D getting byes in the first round. Eight second round games followed by the 4 quarterfinal games aired on February 11 on truTV. The final four remaining players appeared in the semifinals on February 14 and was followed immediately after with a best of three games for the final. Notable exclusions from the 2025 player pool included Stefanie Dolson, Brittney Griner, Sabrina Ionescu, Angel Reese, and Courtney Vandersloot, as well as the leagues's 2025 relief players.

On February 9, the league announced that Natasha Cloud, Tiffany Hayes, Marina Mabrey, Kate Martin, Kayla McBride, Alyssa Thomas, and Brittney Sykes had withdrawn from the tournament due to injury, resulting in multiple walkovers in the bracket.

== Draw ==
The draw for the 2025 1 on 1 tournament was revealed on February 5, 2025.

=== Key ===
- PA = Pod A
- PB = Pod B
- PC = Pod C
- PD = Pod D
- WO = walkover

=== Pod A ===
First Round: Single elimination
1	Jewell Loyd	—
4	Rae Burrell	WO
5	~~Natasha Cloud~~	–
3	~~Alyssa Thomas~~	–
6	Azurá Stevens	WO
2	Chelsea Gray	2
7	Shakira Austin	12

Second Round: Single elimination
1	Jewell Loyd	4
4	Rae Burrell	11
6	Azurá Stevens	11
7	Shakira Austin	4

Quarterfinals: Single elimination
4	Rae Burrell	2
6	Azurá Stevens	12

=== Pod B ===
First Round: Single elimination
1	Napheesa Collier	12
8	Katie Lou Samuelson	6
4	Jackie Young	3
5	Rickea Jackson	11
3	~~Tiffany Hayes~~	–
6	Courtney Williams	WO
2	Rhyne Howard	12
7	Lexie Hull	7

Second Round: Single elimination
1	Napheesa Collier	12
5	Rickea Jackson	5
6	Courtney Williams	11
2	Rhyne Howard	9

Quarterfinals: Single elimination
1	Napheesa Collier	12
6	Courtney Williams	4

=== Pod C ===
First Round: Single elimination
1	Breanna Stewart	0
8	Aaliyah Edwards	12
4	~~Marina Mabrey~~	–
5	~~Kate Martin~~	–
3	Allisha Gray	11
6	Jordin Canada	4
2	Kahleah Copper	11
7	Aliyah Boston	6

Second Round: Single elimination
8	Aaliyah Edwards	WO
–	BYE	–
3	Allisha Gray	11
2	Kahleah Copper	5

Quarterfinals: Single elimination
8	Aaliyah Edwards	12
3	Allisha Gray	6

=== Pod D ===
First Round: Single elimination
1	Arike Ogunbowale	—
4	Skylar Diggins-Smith	11
5	Dearica Hamby	3
3	Satou Sabally	WO
6	~~Brittney Sykes~~	–
2	~~Kayla McBride~~	–
7	DiJonai Carrington	WO

Second Round: Single elimination
1	Arike Ogunbowale	12
4	Skylar Diggins-Smith	8
3	Satou Sabally	11
7	DiJonai Carrington	4

Quarterfinals: Single elimination
1	Arike Ogunbowale	12
3	Satou Sabally	8

=== Finals bracket ===
Quarterfinals: Single elimination
A-4	Rae Burrell	2
A-6	Azurá Stevens	12
B-1	Napheesa Collier	12
B-6	Courtney Williams	4
C-8	Aaliyah Edwards	12
C-3	Allisha Gray	6
D-1	Arike Ogunbowale	12
D-3	Satou Sabally	8

Semifinals: Single elimination
A-6	Azurá Stevens	2
B-1	Napheesa Collier	11
C-8	Aaliyah Edwards	11
D-1	Arike Ogunbowale	2

Final: Best-of-3
B-1	Napheesa Collier	6	9	8
C-8	Aaliyah Edwards	9	4	0
