= Taclobo High School =

Public high school in Negros Oriental, Philippines

Taclobo National High School is a public high school located in Dumaguete, Philippines, established in 1999 by virtue of Republic Act No. 7803, lapsed into law on September 1, 1994, in accordance with Article VI, Section 27 (1) of the Constitution.

== History ==
Taclobo National High School used to be located in the vicinity of West Elementary School, along Cervantes Street in Dumaguete. It occupied only a very limited area consisting of less than fifteen classrooms, in which building used were ones of the West City Elementary School buildings. It was built there since the Barangay Hall is located just in its vicinity. By the year 2007, the City Government of Dumaguete appropriated funds and settled a new site for the school. Taclobo National High School is now situated at West Taclobo, in the boundary of Barangay Batinguel and Taclobo, going inside Pal Subdivision, specifically, 9°18′49″N 123°17′18″E. The school currently has 21 classrooms and 1 building that serves as the principal's office. Six of these rooms come from the donation of the Filipino-Chinese Chamber of Commerce and Industry and Super Lee, Inc. Currently there are two more rooms being built to completion.

== Administration ==
The former Principal of Taclobo National High School was Nelson A. Caday who served from school year 2009 to 2011, succeeding his predecessor, Eleuteria Abiquibil, currently a Principal of Junob National High School. Presently, the school is waiting for a new principal for incoming school year 2011-2012 since the former was soon to move to a higher position, as Dumaguete Schools Division Supervisor.

== Students ==
As of now, there are five sections, namely: Edison, Newton, Einstein, Galilei, and Kepler, from the First Year level, in addition to the former of only four sections. New sections are being initiated because the school's slight increase in population, especially incoming freshmen. There are four sections in the Second year level, or the Sophomores, namely: Pasteur, Watson, Darwin, and Mendel. In the third year level, or the Juniors, there are also four sections, namely: Quezon, Magsaysay, Osmeña, and Roxas. The fourth year level, or the Seniors, consists of only four sections namely:Bonifcio, Mabini, Rizal, and Del Pilar. The students of Taclobo High School are coined "Tachisians."
