= List of schools in Dumaguete =

Dumaguete is the capital of the province of Negros Oriental, Philippines, and has been dubbed as a "university town" or a "center of learning in the south" by the local and regional media due to the presence of four universities and a host of other colleges and schools in the city. This article lists those schools, colleges and universities.

== Universities ==
Name	Location	Year Established
Private
Foundation University (FU)	Main Campus – Miciano Road, Taclobo and North Campus – Dr. V. Locsin St., Taclobo	1949
Silliman University (SU)	Main Campus – Hibbard Avenue, Pob. 5 and College of Agriculture and IEMS Campus – Bantayan	1901
St. Paul University Dumaguete (SPUD)	Veterans Avenue, Bantayan	1904
State
Negros Oriental State University (NORSU)	Main Campus 1 – Kagawasan Avenue, Capitol Area and Main Campus 2 – Bajumpandan	1907

== Colleges ==
Name	Location	Year Established
AMA Computer College Dumaguete	Perdices cor. San Jose Streets, Pob. 3	1980
Asian College – Dumaguete	Dr. V. Locsin Street, Taclobo	1972
Colegio de Santa Catalina de Alejandria (COSCA)	Main Campus - Bishop E. Surban Street, Pob. 3 and Campus 2 - Brgy. Talay	1959
Maxino College	Bagacay	2007
Metro Dumaguete College	Main Campus - E.J. Blanco Extension, Daro and Campus 2 - Brgy. Magatas, Sibulan	2002
Presbyterian Theological College	Cantil-e	1995
STI College Dumaguete	Libertad Street, Pob. 8	1983

== Technical-Vocational Institutes ==
Name	Location	Date Established
Dumaguete Academy for Culinary Arts (DACA)	Rizal Blvd., Brgy. 4	2010
En Gedi International College	Upper Talay	2012
Metrologyx Institute of Technology - Metro Dumaguete Campus	Motong	2023
New World Culinary Institute - Dumaguete	Claytown, Daro	2019
Royhle Flight Training Academy	Buñao	2013
Teamskills Technological College, Inc.	Capitol Area, Daro / Lower Batinguel	2011
UpFuture Technical and Vocational Institute Inc.	West Rovira Road, Pulantubig	2023

== Private elementary & high schools ==
Name	Pre-School	Grade School	High School
ABC Learning Center	√	√	
Catherina Cittadini School (closed)	√	√	√
Dumaguete Agape Chinese Christian Academy (DACCA)	√	√	√
Dumaguete Mission School	√	√	√
Dumaguete Missionary Baptist Academy	√	√	√
Dumaguete UCCP Learning Center	√		
FBC-Alpha Omega Academy	√	√	√
Galileo Learning Center	√		
Ginjosh Grace Christian Academy	√		
Heartland Academy of Dumaguete, Inc. (Living Word Christian School)	√	√	
Holy Cross High School	√	√	√
Joshua Generation International Academy	√		
Kainos Montessori Christian Academy, Inc.	√	√	
Larmen de Guia Memorial College	√	√	√
Lifegiver Christian Academy	√	√	√
Little Village Educational Foundation, Inc.	√	√	√
Maranatha Christian Academy of Dumaguete	√		
Olivet Learning Institute of Asia	√	√	
Siloam International Christian School	√	√	
Soongsil Agapia International High School	√	√	√
SouthDale Integrated School	√	√	√
St. Louis School of Don Bosco	√	√	√
SYL (Saceda Youth Lead) High School			√

== Public elementary schools ==
The DepEd-Dumaguete Schools Division has 3 districts namely: North District, South District and West District. DepEd Division office is located inside the campus of Taclobo National High School.

Name	Location	Year Established
NORTH DISTRICT
Amador Dagudag Memorial Elementary School (formerly East City Elementary School)	Flores Avenue, Looc	1927
Batinguel Elementary School	Batinguel	1939
Camanjac Elementary School	Camanjac	1938
Candau-ay Elementary School	Candau-ay	1958
Magsaysay Memorial Integrated Farm School	L. Rovira Road, Pulantubig	1936
North City Elementary School	E.J. Blanco Drive, Piapi	1936
WEST DISTRICT
Balugo Elementary School	Balugo	1975
Cadawinonan Elementary School	Cadawinonan	1976
Junob Elementary School	Talay	1925
West City Elementary School	Jose Pro Teves Street, Taclobo	1932
West City Exceptional Child Learning Center (SPED)	WCES Compound, Taclobo	1992
West City Science Elementary School	WCES Compound, Taclobo	1997
SOUTH DISTRICT
Babajuba Elementary School	Junob	1994
Calindagan Elementary School	Cittadini School Compound, Calindagan	1993
Cantil-e Elementary School	Cantil-e	1957
City Central Elementary School	Cittadini School Compound, Calindagan	1947
Hermenegilda F. Gloria Memorial Elementary School	Banilad	1997
South City Elementary School	L. Macias Avenue, Mangnao-Canal	1931

== Public high schools ==
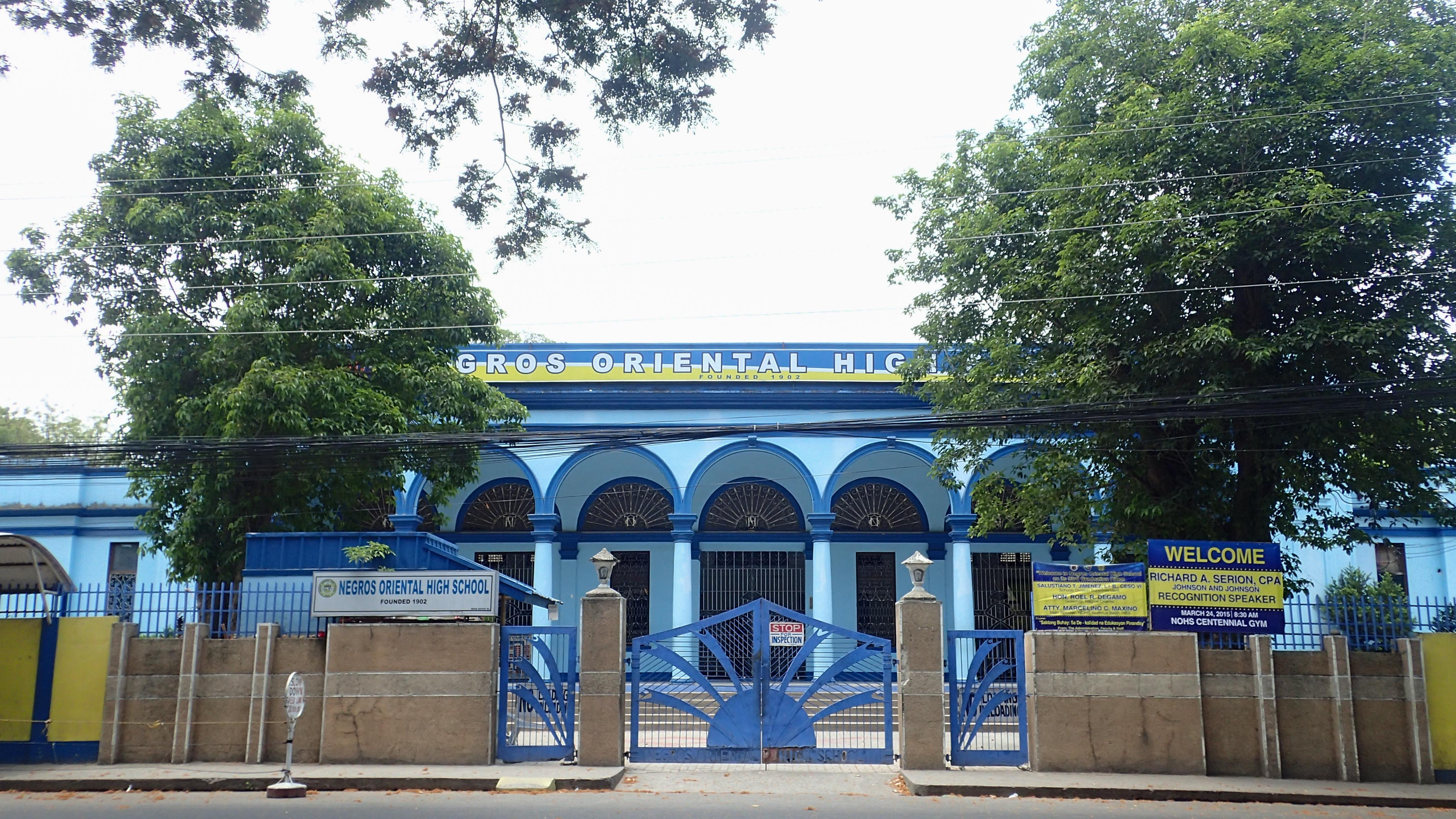
Gabaldon Heritage Building of Negros Oriental High School

Name	Location	Year Established
Camanjac National High School	Camanjac	1968
Calenica Gono Pal Technical-Vocational School	Batinguel	2025
Dumaguete City National High School*	City High Road, Calindagan	1967
Hermenegilda F. Gloria Memorial High School	Banilad	2002
Junob National High School	Talay	1983
Magsaysay Memorial Integrated Farm School (High School)	Pulantubig	2026
Negros Oriental High School^	Kagawasan Avenue, Capitol Area, Daro	1902
Piapi High School	E.J. Blanco Drive, Piapi	2007
RTPM-Dumaguete Science High School (Regional Science High School of Negros Island Region)	Ma. Asuncion Avenue, Daro	1988
Taclobo National High School	Taclobo	1999
*Division Leader School, DepEd Dumaguete
^Division Leader School, DepEd Negros Oriental
