= Sports team =

Individual team that plays sports

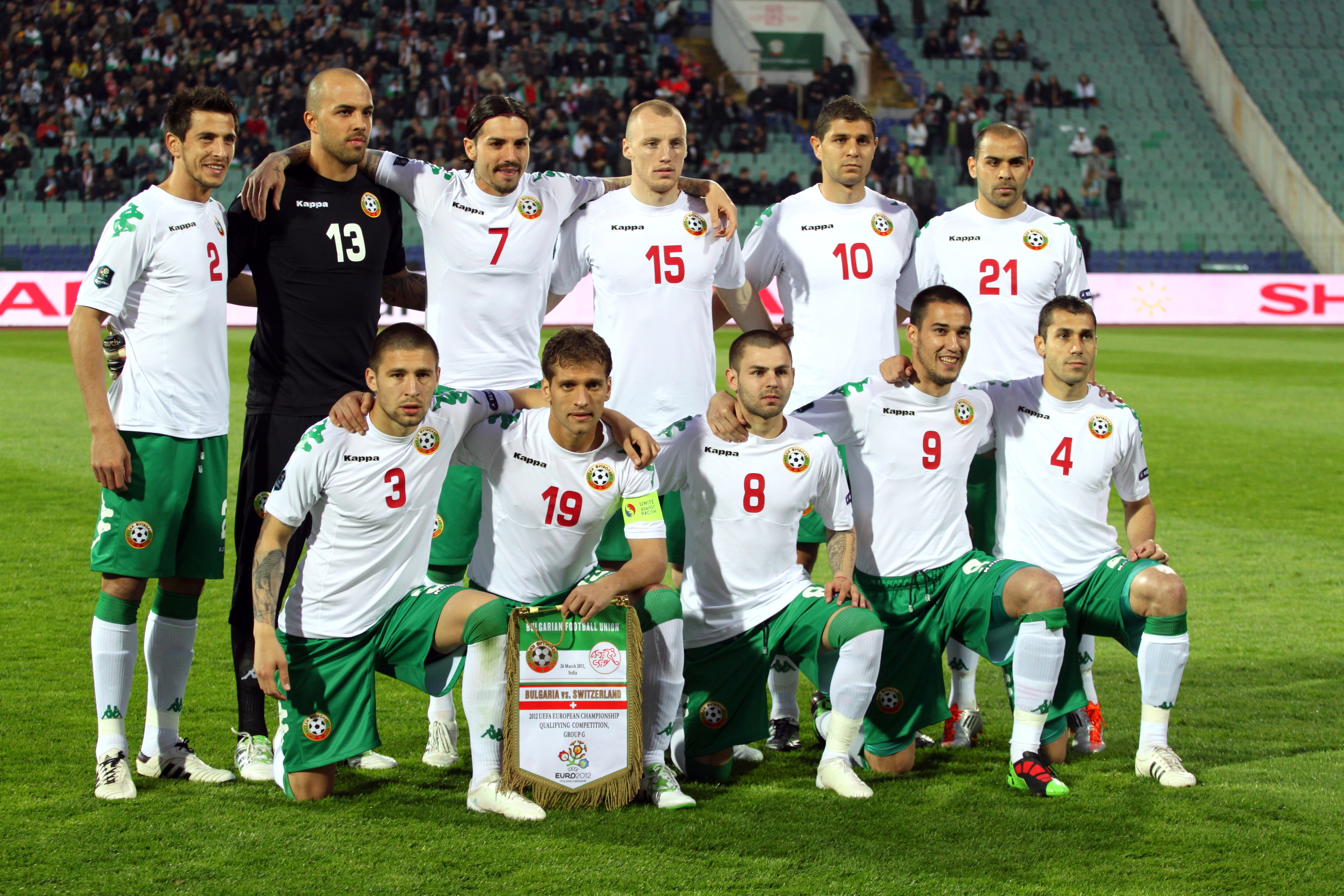
The Bulgaria national football team in 2011

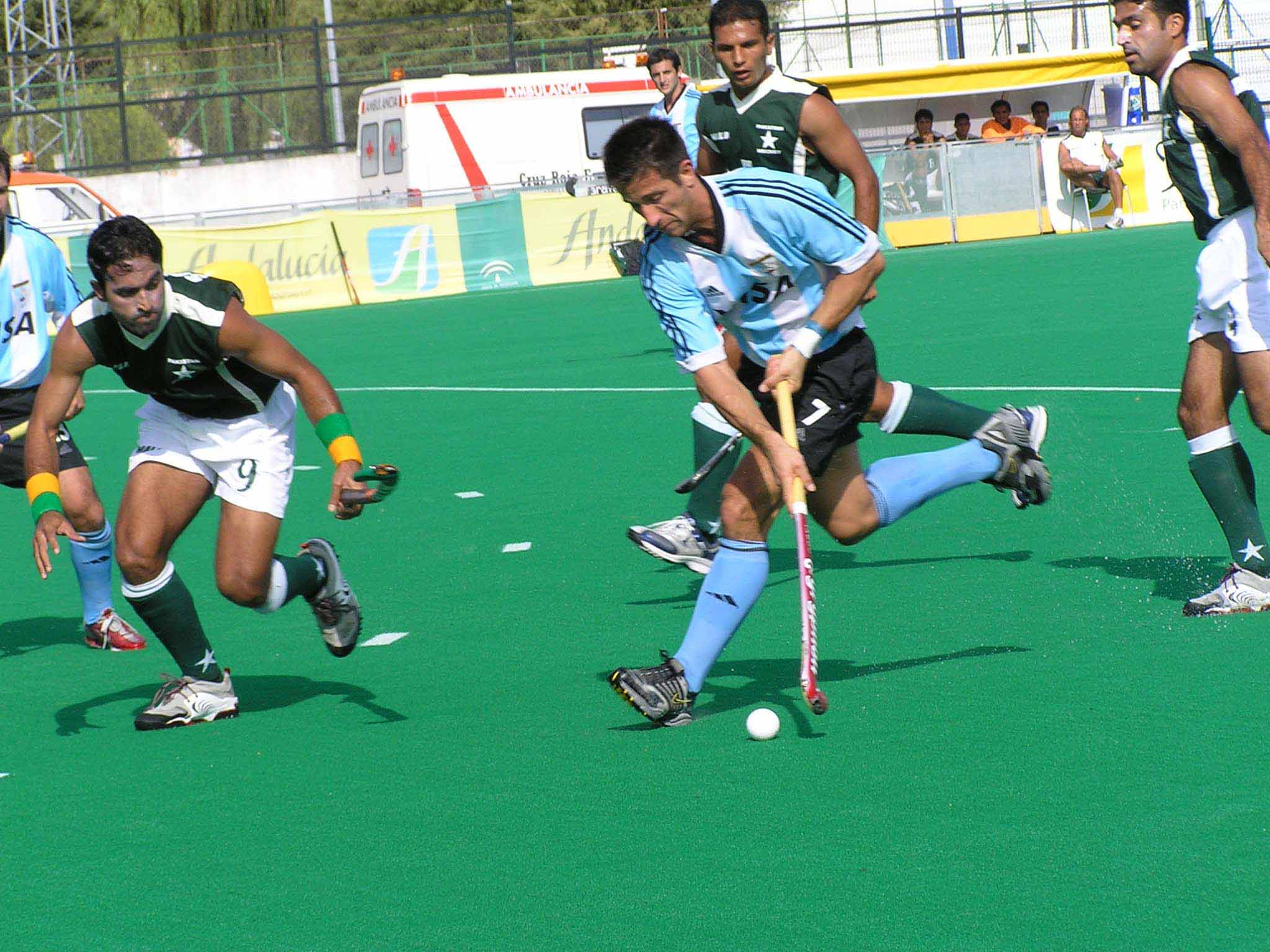
Two teams, black and blue, compete in a field hockey match

A sports team is a group of individuals who play a team sport together. The number of players in the group depends on the sport. The highest level of a sports team is a professional sports team. In professional sports, the athletes are very talented and are paid to compete in their sport.

Historically, sports teams and the people who played them were primarily amateurs. By the 20th century, however, many sports teams and their associated leagues had become extremely valuable, with net worths reaching into the millions. In 2017, the Dallas Cowboys were ranked by Forbes as the world's most valuable sports team, valued at US $4.2 billion. Some individual sports have also introduced team-based versions through modified rules.

Team identities can be formed from a number of sources, most often a type of geographic location; e.g., the Dallas Cowboys are named after Dallas, Texas, US. Some teams can also be named after an institution, such as the Alabama Crimson Tide, who represent the University of Alabama, or the Yomiuri Giants, who are named after the Yomiuri Group, a Japanese media conglomerate.

Sports teams often have numbered jerseys for fans to identify players. Players wear jerseys for different reasons. It may depend on the position of the player, the history of the number, traditions that are specific to the league, and more.

== See also ==
- Social group
- Sports club
- Sports franchise
- Works team
