= Kalabancoro =

- Commune and town
- Location in Mali
- Coordinates: 12°34′20″N 8°1′44″W
- Country: Mali
- Region: Koulikoro Region
- Cercle: Kati Cercle

Population (2009 census)
  - Total: 166,722
- Time zone: UTC+0 (GMT)

Kalabancoro or Kalaban Koro is a rural commune and town in the cercle of Kati within the Koulikoro Region of south-western Mali. The commune has become part of the suburbs of Bamako, the Malian capital. It lies on the south side of the Niger River, to the south and west of the urban communes V and VI of Bamako. The commune is growing very rapidly. In 1998 it had a population of 35,582 but by 2009 this had grown to 166,722. It is now Mali's third most populous commune, and by far the most populous rural commune.

== See also ==
- List of cities in Mali
