= One-on-one (basketball) =

Basketball game played by two people

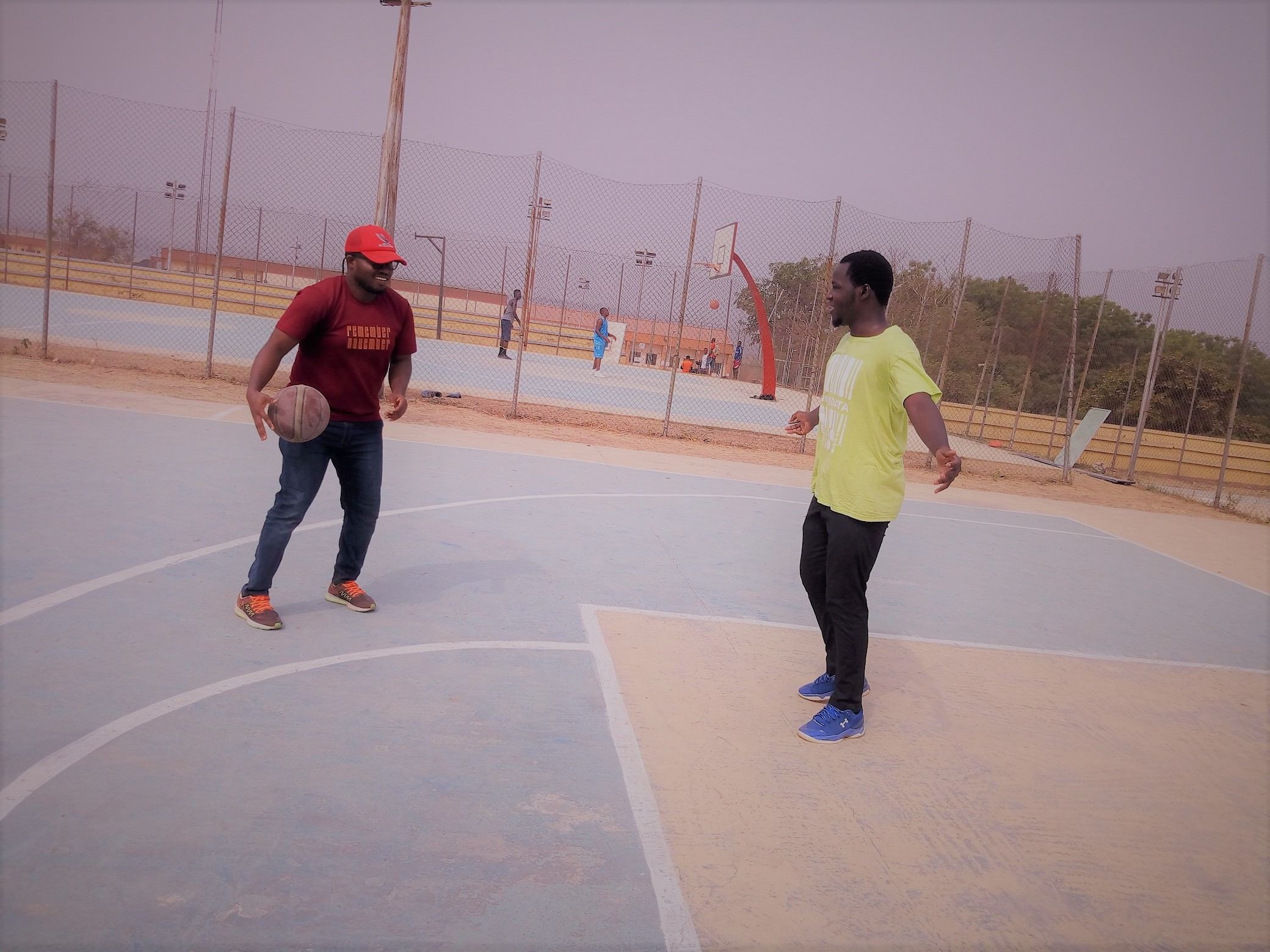
A one-on-one basketball game

One-on-one refers to a basketball game played between individuals. After World War II, one-on-one basketball tournaments proliferated. A usual basketball game consists of five-on-five. There is three-on-three, or even six-on-six.

Tracy McGrady's Ones Basketball League is a one-on-one basketball league.

Features of one-on-one basketball which may differ from a normal game include "make it take it", where making a shot is rewarded with possession of the ball instead of giving it to the opposing team. Also, when there is a change of possession, the player who just got the ball has to take the ball back behind the free throw line. Often times in one-on-one a player is expected to "check" the ball, meaning to start a possession by passing it to the opposing defender, who then passes it back.
