= 2007 UST Growling Tigers basketball team =

Basketball team which represented University of Santo Tomas

2007 UST Growling Tigers men's basketball

Record
- Elims rank: #T-4
- Final rank: #4
- 2007 record: 9–7 (8–6 elims)
- Head coach: Pido Jarencio (2nd season)
- Assistant coaches: Senen Dueñas; Beaujing Acot
- Captain: Anthony Espiritu (5th season)

The 2007 UST Growling Tigers men's basketball team represented University of Santo Tomas in the 70th season of the University Athletic Association of the Philippines. The men's basketball tournament for the school year 2007-08 began on July 7, 2007 and the host school for the season was also UST.

The Tigers, the Season 69 champions, ended the double round-robin eliminations in joint fourth place with the FEU Tamaraws with eight wins and six losses. They then won over FEU in the playoff for the fourth and final semifinal slot. UST held the Tamaraws to a season-low of 6 points in the second quarter. They were eliminated by the Ateneo Blue Eagles in a knockout game of the first round of the stepladder Semifinals for the right to face the second-seeded De La Salle Green Archers in the second round.

UST suffered back-to-back losses at the start of the season but recovered by winning four of their next five games to finish the first round at third place with a 4–3 record.

Two of their games went into overtime and were both against La Salle who had rejoined the league after serving a one-year suspension in Season 69 for fielding ineligible players in the past three years.. The first was an 86–90 first round loss and the other was an 81–73 win. They have defeated the Green Archers for the first time since the 1999 Finals where the Tigers lost in a three-game series with Game Three also going into overtime.

Jervy Cruz was named Most Valuable Player of the season. He topped the statistical points tally with 75.9 at the end of the second round of eliminations on top of 11 double-doubles that included two playoff games. The last UST player to win the MVP was Chris Cantonjos in 1995. Cruz was third in the league in scoring with an average of 16.7 points per game behind the 21.3 average of Adamson's Patrick Cabahug and the 17.6 points per game of NU Bulldogs' Edwin Asoro. He led the league in rebounds with a 15.4 per game average.

Francis Allera was chosen Player of the Week by the UAAP Press Corps for the duration of July 19–22, while Khasim Mirza received the citation twice on the weeks of August 2–5 and 23–26.

== Roster ==
UST Growling Tigers roster
Players
Coaches

| Pos. | No. | Nat. | Name | Height | Year | High School |
|---|---|---|---|---|---|---|
| SG | 5 | (Philippines) | John Hector Badua | 5'11" (1.8m) | 1st | University of Santo Tomas |
| SF | 6 | (Philippines) | Dylan Simon Ababou | 6'3" (1.91m) | 3rd | Siena College of Quezon City |
| PF | 7 | (Philippines) | Mark Angelo Canlas | 6'5" (1.96m) | 3rd | Don Bosco Academy, Pampanga |
| SG | 8 | (Philippines) | Anrhony Espiritu (C) | 6'4" (1.93m) | 5th | University of Santo Tomas |
| PF | 9 | (Australia) | Melchor Gile | 6'4" (1.93m) | 3rd | – |
| PF | 10 | (Philippines) | June Dizon | 6'4" (1.93m) | 5th | San Sebastian College-Recoletos |
| SG | 11 | (Philippines) | John Darryl Basa | 6'1" (1.85m) | 1st | University of Santo Tomas |
| PG | 12 | (Philippines) | Jose Cortez, Jr. | 5'10" (1.78m) | 5th | University of Santo Tomas |
| SF | 14 | (Philippines) | Khasim Ali Mirza | 6'4" (1.93m) | 3rd | La Salle College Antipolo |
| SG | 16 | (Philippines) | Franciz Philip Allera | 6'3" (1.91m) | 4th | Dole Philippines School |
| C | 17 | (Australia) | Chester Lloyd Taylor | 6'4" (1.93m) | 4th | Colegio San Agustin – Makati |
| PG | 18 | (Philippines) | John Paul Cuan | 5'7" (1.7m) | 4th | University of Santo Tomas |
| C | 19 | (Philippines) | Francis Soriano | 6'6" (1.98m) | 4th | – |
| C | 20 | (Philippines) | Jervy Cruz | 6'4" (1.93m) | 4th | Our Lady of the Sacred Heart College |
| PG | 21 | (United States) | Rum Perry Scott | 5'9" (1.75m) | 5th | St. Joseph School |

Head coach

- (Philippines) Alfredo Jarencio

Assistant coach(es)

- Rhuel Acot
- Senen Dueñas
- Julian Rabbi Tomacruz
- Rodil Sablan

Strength & conditioning coach(es)

- Emmanuel Calipes
- Edwin Escobar
- Arlene Chua-Chiong Maya

Team manager

- Clarence Aytona
- Timmy Chong
- Rudy Yu

Legend

- (C) Team captain
- Injured

- Roster

=== Depth chart ===
| Pos. | Starting 5 | Bench 1 | Bench 2 |
|---|---|---|---|
| C | Cruz | Taylor | Soriano |
| PF | Canlas | Dizon | Gile |
| SF | Ababou | Allera | Basa |
| SG | Mirza | Espiritu | Badua |
| PG | Cuan | Cortez | Scott |

== Roster changes ==
=== Subtractions ===
| Pos. | No. | Nat. | Player | Height | Year | High school | Notes |
|---|---|---|---|---|---|---|---|
| SG | 5 | (Philippines) | Andre Charles Marquez | 6' 3" | 2nd | La Salle Greenhills | Relegated to Team B |
| SG | 11 | (Philippines) | Joselito Duncil | 6' 1" | 5th | Balucuc National High School | Forwent final year to turn professional |
| SG | 14 | (Philippines) | Jemal Vizcarra | 6' 1" | 5th | Adamson University | Graduated |
| PF | 21 | (Philippines) | Allan Evangelista | 6' 3" | 5th | San Sebastian College-Recoletos | Graduated |

=== Additions ===
| Pos. | No. | Nat. | Player | Height | Year | High school | Notes |
|---|---|---|---|---|---|---|---|
| SG | 5 | (Philippines) | John Hector Badua | 5' 11" | 1st | University of Santo Tomas | Promoted from Team B |
| SG | 11 | (Philippines) | John Darryl Basa | 6' 1" | 1st | University of Santo Tomas | Rookie |
| SF | 14 | (Philippines) | Khasim Ali Mirza | 6' 4" | 3rd | La Salle College Antipolo | Transferred from World Citi Colleges |
| C | 19 | (Philippines) | Francis Soriano | 6' 6" | 4th | | Transferee |
| PG | 21 | (United States) | Rum Perry Scott | 5' 9" | 5th | St. Joseph School | Transferred from Lyceum of the Philippines University |

== Ineligibility issues ==
Jojo Duncil, the Finals MVP of last year's championship series has announced to the team his decision to turn professional and forego his last playing year in the collegiate ranks.

It was revealed on July 2 during the press conference for the upcoming UAAP Season 70 by Institute of Physical Education and Athletics (IPEA) director Fr. Ermito de Sagon that Duncil's age eligibility was being questioned by other member schools after it was discovered that Duncil had two NSO certificates that showed varying data. One birth certificate had 1983 as Duncil's year of birth while another had shown that he was born in 1982.

According to Fr. de Sagon of the season's host school, the team decided to exclude him from the roster to avoid future games being put under protest which can only cause distraction to the rest of the team. De Sagon added that Duncil, being the rector's nephew is undoubtedly only 24 years old and is eligible to play this season.

== Schedule and results ==
=== Preseason tournaments ===
The Nike Summer League and the Filoil Flying V Preseason Invitational Cup games were aired on Studio 23.

Preseason game log

2007 Nike Summer League: 1–5
| Game | Date • Time | Opponent | Result | Record | High points | High rebounds | High assists | Location |
|---|---|---|---|---|---|---|---|---|
| 1 | Apr 23 | NU Bulldogs | L 59–72 | 0–1 | Basa (16) | | | FEU Gym; Manila |
| 2 | Apr 26 | Ateneo de Zamboanga Eagles | L 110–115^{OT} | 0–2 | Afuang (27) | | | FEU Gym; Manila |
| 3 | May 1 | Mapúa Cardinals | L 62–79 | 0–3 | | | | FEU Gym; Manila |
| 4 | May 3 | FEU Tamaraws | L 51–93 | 0–4 | | | | FEU Gym; Manila |
| 5 | May 5 | UP Fighting Maroons | L 70–78 | 0–5 | Basa (18) | | | FEU Gym; Manila |
| 6 | May 7 | Benilde Blazers | W 82–79 | 1–5 | Basa (18) | | | FEU Gym; Manila |

2007 Filoil Flying V Preseason Invitational Cup: 2–5
| Game | Date • Time | Opponent | Result | Record | High points | High rebounds | High assists | Location |
|---|---|---|---|---|---|---|---|---|
| 1 (Note: Won by forfeit) | May 2 • 6:00 pm | Perpetual Altas | W | 1–0 | | | | The Arena; San Juan |
| 2 | May 4 • 6:00 pm | San Beda Red Lions | L 82–103 | 1–1 | Basa (25) | | | The Arena; San Juan |
| 3 | May 6 • 2:00 pm | Ateneo Blue Eagles | L 60–67 | 1–2 | Basa (16) | | | The Arena; San Juan |
| 4 | May 23 • 4:00 pm | UE Red Warriors | L 78–98 | 1–3 | Afuang (22) | | | The Arena; San Juan |
| 5 | May 25 • 4:00 pm | UP Fighting Maroons | L 69–71 | 1–4 | | | | The Arena; San Juan |
| 6 | May 27 • 2:00 pm | FEU Tamaraws | L 57–84 | 1–5 | Afuang (13) | | | The Arena; San Juan |
| 7 | Jun 1 • 2:00 pm | JRU Heavy Bombers | W 96–92 | 2–5 | Afuang (23) | | | The Arena; San Juan |

Penang Unity Cup–Southeast Asian Basketball Invitational Tournament: 4–2
| Game | Date • Time | Opponent | Result | Record | High points | High rebounds | High assists | Location |
|---|---|---|---|---|---|---|---|---|
| 1 | May 9 | Chiap Hong | W 115–58 | 1–0 | | | | Berapit indoor court Seberang Perai |
| 2 | May 10 | Youngster Basketball Club | W 94–71 | 2–0 | | | | Youngster Club gym George Town, Penang |
| 3 | May 11 | Han Chiang College | L 92–93 | 2–1 | Tied (18) | | | Han Chiang gym George Town, Penang |
| 4 | May 12 | Han Chiang College | L 75–103 | 2–2 | Ababou (15) | | | Han Chiang gym George Town, Penang |
| 5 | May 14 | Young-one Sports Club | W 106–32 | 3–2 | Dizon (22) | | | Young-one Sports Center; George Town, Penang |
| 6 | May 15 | Malaysia U-18 Club | W 106–52 | 4–2 | Dizon (16) | | | Seberang Jaya court Seberang Perai |

(#) Tournament seedings in parentheses.
All times are in UTC+08:00.

=== UAAP games ===
Elimination games were played in a double round-robin format and all of UST's games were televised on Studio 23.

UAAP Season 70 game log

Elimination round: 8–6
| Game | Date • Time | Opponent | Result | Record | High points | High rebounds | High assists | Location |
|---|---|---|---|---|---|---|---|---|
| 1 | Jul 8 • 4:00 pm | UE Red Warriors | L 60–73 | 0–1 | Cruz (16) | Tied (9) | | Cuneta Astrodome; Pasay |
| 2 | Jul 14 • 4:00 pm | FEU Tamaraws | L 66–81 | 0–2 | Cruz (19) | Cruz (22) | Cuan (4) | Ninoy Aquino Stadium; Manila |
| 3 | Jul 19 • 2:00 pm | Adamson Soaring Falcons | W 96–84 | 1–2 | Allera (26) | Cruz (23) | | Ninoy Aquino Stadium; Manila |
| 4 | Jul 21 • 4:00 pm | UP Fighting Maroons | W 76–68 | 2–2 | Allera (15) | | | Ninoy Aquino Stadium; Manila |
| 5 | Jul 26 • 2:00 pm | NU Bulldogs | W 83–72 | 3–2 | Ababou (18) | Cuan (8) | Cuan (7) | Araneta Coliseum; Quezon City |
| 6 | Jul 29 • 2:00 pm | De La Salle Green Archers | L 86–90^{OT} | 3–3 | Cruz (22) | | | Araneta Coliseum; Quezon City |
| 7 | Aug 4 • 4:00 pm | Ateneo Blue Eagles; End of R1 of eliminations | W 87–74 | 4–3 | Mirza (25) | Cruz (21) | | Cuneta Astrodome; Pasay |
| 8 | Aug 11 • 4:00 pm | De La Salle Green Archers | W 81–73^{OT} | 5–3 | Cruz (16) | Cruz (18) | | Araneta Coliseum; Quezon City |
| | Aug 16 • 2:00 pm | UP Fighting Maroons | Postponed due to Typhoon Egay | | | | | Araneta Coliseum; Quezon City |
| 9 | Aug 19 • 2:00 pm | UE Red Warriors | L 82–99 | 5–4 | Mirza (18) | | | Cuneta Astrodome; Pasay |
| 10 | Aug 26 • 4:00 pm | NU Bulldogs | W 84–72 | 6–4 | Mirza (19) | | | Araneta Coliseum; Quezon City |
| 11 | Aug 30 • 4:00 pm | Ateneo Blue Eagles | L 71–72 | 6–5 | Cruz (22) | Cruz (18) | | Araneta Coliseum; Quezon City |
| 12 | Sep 2 • 2:00 pm | UP Fighting Maroons | W 77–61 | 7–5 | Espiritu (16) | Cruz (14) | Cruz (4) | Araneta Coliseum; Quezon City |
| 13 | Sep 9 • 2:00 pm | Adamson Falcons | W 74–62 | 8–5 | Cruz (24) | Cruz (18) | | Araneta; Coliseum Quezon City |
| 14 | Sep 13 • 2:00 pm | FEU Tamaraws; End of R2 of eliminations | L 73–84 | 8–6 | Cruz (13) | | | Araneta Coliseum; Quezon City |

Playoff for fourth seed: 1–0
| Game | Date • Time | Seed | Opponent | Result | Series | High points | High rebounds | High assists | Location |
|---|---|---|---|---|---|---|---|---|---|
| 1 | Sep 17 • 3:00 pm | | FEU Tamaraws | W 80–69 | 1–0 (9–6) | Cruz (17) | Cruz (14) | Cuan (8) | Araneta Coliseum; Quezon City |

Final Four: 0–1
| Game | Date • Time | Seed | Opponent | Result | Series | High points | High rebounds | High assists | Location |
|---|---|---|---|---|---|---|---|---|---|
| 1 | Sep 23 • 3:00 pm | (#4) | (#1) Ateneo Blue Eagles | L 64–69 | 0–1 (9–7) | Cruz (17) | Cruz (16) | Cuan (5) | Araneta Coliseum; Quezon City |

(#) Tournament seedings in parentheses.
All times are in UTC+08:00.
Source: inboundPASS

=== Postseason tournament ===
Postseason game log

2007 Philippine Collegiate Championship: 2–2
| Game | Date • Time | Opponent | Result | Record | High points | High rebounds | High assists | Location |
|---|---|---|---|---|---|---|---|---|
| 1 | Nov 12 • 2:00 pm | Mapúa Cardinals; Round of 16 | W 91–90 | 1–0 | Allera (25) | | | St. Placid Gym; Manila |
| 2 | Nov 19 • 4:00 pm | San Beda Red Lions; Elite Eight | W 88–84 | 2–0 | Cruz (21) | | | The Arena; San Juan |
| 3 | Nov 26 • 4:00 pm | Ateneo Blue Eagles; Final Four | L 66–92 | 2–1 | Ababou (22) | | | The Arena; San Juan |
| 4 | Nov 28 • 2:00 pm | STI Olympians; Battle for 3rd place | L 81–87^{OT} | 2–2 | Cruz (21) | | | The Arena; San Juan |

(#) Tournament seedings in parentheses.
All times are in UTC+08:00.

== UAAP statistics ==
=== Eliminations ===
| Player | GP | PPG | Season high |
|---|---|---|---|
| Jervy Cruz | 14 | 16.7 | 24 |
| Khasim Mirza | 14 | 11.6 | 25 |
| Dylan Ababou | 14 | 10.5 | 18 |
| Anthony Espiritu | 14 | 7.8 | 16 |
| Japs Cuan | 14 | 7.8 | 13 |
| Badong Canlas | 13 | 6.1 | 10 |
| Francis Allera | 14 | 6.0 | 26 |
| Jun Cortez | 14 | 3.6 | 10 |
| Chester Taylor | 13 | 3.5 | 9 |
| June Dizon | 14 | 2.1 | 7 |
| Hector Badua | 6 | 1.8 | 6 |
| Mel Gile | 12 | 1.6 | 6 |
| Rum Perry Scott | 7 | 1.0 | 4 |
| Kiko Soriano | 3 | 0.7 | 2 |
| Darryl Basa | 4 | 0.5 | 2 |
| Total | 14 | 78.3 | 96 |
| Opponents | 14 | 76.1 | 99 |

=== Playoffs ===
| Player | GP | PPG | Playoff high |
|---|---|---|---|
| Jervy Cruz | 2 | 17.0 | 17 |
| Dylan Ababou | 2 | 13.5 | 16 |
| Badong Canlas | 2 | 10.0 | 14 |
| Anthony Espiritu | 2 | 8.5 | 12 |
| Khasim Mirza | 2 | 7.0 | 11 |
| Japs Cuan | 2 | 5.0 | 8 |
| Jun Cortez | 2 | 4.0 | 8 |
| Chester Taylor | 2 | 3.5 | 7 |
| Francis Allera | 2 | 2.5 | 5 |
| June Dizon | 2 | 1.0 | 2 |
| Total | 2 | 72.0 | 80 |
| Opponents | 2 | 69.0 | 69 |

== Awards ==
| Name | Award | Date | Ref. |
|---|---|---|---|
| Jervy Cruz | Season MVP | 7 Oct 2007 | |
| Jervy Cruz | Mythical team | 7 Oct 2007 | |
| Jervy Cruz | PSBank Maaasahan Award | 7 Oct 2007 | |
| Japs Cuan | KFC Assist Delivery Award | 7 Oct 2007 | |
| Francis Allera | Player of the Week | 19–22 Jul 2007 | |
| Khasim Mirza | Player of the Week | 2–5 Aug 2007 | |
| Khasim Mirza | Player of the Week | 23–26 Aug 2007 | |
