= 2008 UST Growling Tigers basketball team =

2008 UST Growling Tigers men's basketball

Record
- Elims rank: #5
- Final rank: #5
- 2008 record: 6–8
- Head coach: Pido Jarencio (3rd season)
- Assistant coaches: Senen Dueñas; Beaujing Acot
- Captain: Francis Allera (5th season)

The 2008 UST Growling Tigers men's basketball team represented University of Santo Tomas in the 71st season of the University Athletic Association of the Philippines. The men's basketball tournament for the school year 2008-09 began on July 5, 2008 and the host school for the season was the University of the Philippines who were celebrating their centennial year.

UST finished fifth at the end of the double round-robin eliminations. They won six games against eight losses. Two of their games went into overtime. The first was an 86–80 win over the Adamson Falcons in the first round, and the other was a 69–74 loss to the FEU Tamaraws in the second round.

The Tigers' second round losses to FEU and to the De La Salle Green Archers meant that they needed to win their last two games to at least tie the UE Red Warriors to gain a playoff for the fourth and final seed heading into the Final Four. They were fifth in the standings at 5 wins and 7 losses, while UE was fourth with a 7–5 record. They were also hoping for the Red Warriors to lose their remaining two games for a playoff to happen.

The game resulted to a two-point loss for UST. The Tigers had struggled throughout the game with errors and inconsistencies. Their opponent had led by 22 points at the end of three quarters. Head coach Pido Jarencio got ejected, but in a display of grit and determination, UST fought back and chipped away at UE's lead, resulting to a 24–1 run. The Tigers who got eliminated ended up scoring 35 points in the fourth quarter.

Season 70 MVP Jervy Cruz was included in the Mythical team selection during the presentation of awards for Season 71. He had played the entire season while nursing a hamstring injury and even led the MVP race at the end of the eliminations with 75.1 statistical points, on top of a double-double average of 19.8 points and 13.7 rebounds per game. He has led the league in rebounds since his first playing year in 2006. The MVP award eventually went to Ateneo's Rabeh Al-Hussaini who was second in running with 71.1 statistical points.

The Growling Tigers was the season's top rebounding team with a 48.4 per game average.

== Roster ==
UST Growling Tigers roster
Players
Coaches

Pos.	No.	Nat.	Name	Height	Year	High School
SG	5	(Philippines)	Clark Daniel Oliver Bautista	5'9" (1.75m)	1st	Benedictine International School
SF	6	(Philippines)	Dylan Simon Ababou	6'3" (1.91m)	4th	Siena College of Quezon City
C	7	(Philippines)	Mark Angelo Canlas	6'5" (1.96m)	4th	Don Bosco Academy, Pampanga
PG	8	(Philippines)	Emilian Vargas	5'11" (1.8m)	2nd	–
PF	9	(Australia)	Melchor Gile	6'4" (1.93m)	4th	–
PG	10	(Philippines)	Jeric Marco Fortuna	5'7" (1.7m)	1st	De La Salle Santiago Zobel School
PF	11	(Philippines)	Carmelo Afuang	6'4" (1.93m)	1st	San Beda College–Rizal
PF	12	(United States)	Christopher Camus	6'4" (1.93m)	2nd	Sunny Hills High School
SF	14	(Philippines)	Khasim Ali Mirza	6'4" (1.93m)	4th	La Salle College Antipolo
SG	16	(Philippines)	Franciz Philip Allera (C)	6'3" (1.91m)	5th	Dole Philippines School
C	17	(Australia)	Chester Lloyd Taylor	6'4" (1.93m)	5th	Colegio San Agustin – Makati
PG	18	(Philippines)	John Paul Cuan	5'7" (1.7m)	5th	University of Santo Tomas
SG	19	(Philippines)	Carlos Amador Fenequito	6'0" (1.83m)	3rd	–
C	20	(Philippines)	Jervy Cruz	6'4" (1.93m)	5th	Our Lady of the Sacred Heart College
PG	21	(Philippines)	Jackson Wong	5'10" (1.78m)	1st	Philippine Academy of Sakya-Manila
PF	22	(Philippines)	Allein Gail Maliksi (injured)	6'4" (1.93m)	3rd	Camarin High School

Head coach

- (Philippines) Alfredo Jarencio

Assistant coach(es)

- Rhuel Acot
- Senen Dueñas
- Julian Rabbi Tomacruz
- Rodil Sablan

Strength & conditioning coach(es)

- Emmanuel Calipes
- Edwin Escobar

Team manager

- Clarence Aytona
- Timmy Chong
- Rudy Yu

Legend

- (C) Team captain
- Injured

- Roster

=== Depth chart ===
Pos.	Starting 5	Bench 1	Bench 2
C	Cruz	Taylor	Camus
PF	Canlas	Gile	Afuang
SF	Ababou	Mirza
SG	Allera	Bautista	Fenequito
PG	Cuan	Fortuna	Vargas

== Roster changes ==
The Growling Tigers have lost three of their veterans in center June Dizon, point guards Jun Cortez and Rum Perry Scott, and team captain Anthony Espiritu to graduation and are parading eight new players composed of rookies, transferees and players from the Team B training pool.

=== Subtractions ===
Pos.	No.	Nat.	Player	Height	Year	High school	Notes
SG	5	(Philippines)	John Hector Badua	5' 11"	2nd	University of Santo Tomas	Transferred to José Rizal University
SF	8	(Philippines)	Anthony Espiritu	6' 4"	5th	University of Santo Tomas	Graduated
PF	10	(Philippines)	June Dizon	6' 4"	5th	San Sebastian College-Recoletos	Graduated
SG	11	(Philippines)	John Darryl Basa	6' 1"	2nd	University of Santo Tomas	Relegated to Team B
PG	12	(Philippines)	Jose Cortez, Jr.	5' 10"	5th	University of Santo Tomas	Graduated
C	19	(Philippines)	Francis Soriano	6' 6"	4th		
PG	21	(United States)	Rum Perry Scott	5' 9"	5th	St. Joseph School	Graduated

=== Additions ===
Pos.	No.	Nat.	Player	Height	Year	High school	Notes
SG	5	(Philippines)	Clark Daniel Oliver Bautista	5' 9"	1st	Benedictine International School	Promoted from Team B
PG	8	(Philippines)	Emilian Vargas	5' 11"	2nd		Transferred from Emilio Aguinaldo College
PG	10	(Philippines)	Jeric Marco Fortuna	5' 7"	1st	De La Salle Santiago Zobel School	Rookie
PF	11	(Philippines)	Carmelo Afuang	6' 4"	1st	San Beda College–Rizal	Promoted from Team B
PF	12	(United States)	Christopher Camus	6' 4"	2nd	Sunny Hills High School	Transferred from San Beda College
SG	19	(Philippines)	Carlos Amador Fenequito	6' 0"	3rd		Transferred from José Rizal University
PG	21	(Philippines)	Jackson Wong	5' 10"	1st	Philippine Academy of Sakya-Manila	Rookie
PF	22	(Philippines)	Allein Gail Maliksi	6' 4"	3rd	Camarin High School	Transferred from University of Manila

== Injuries ==
The Growling Tigers did not join any major preseason tournaments on two reasons: their veteran players had been busy playing for their commercial teams in the Philippine Basketball League in the summer; and eight of their players suffered various injures before the UAAP tournament.

- Jervy Cruz played in all 14 UAAP games while nursing a pulled hamstring which he incurred while playing for the Hapee Fresh Fighters in an out-of-town game in May.
- Dylan Ababou fractured his right hand while playing for the Harbour Centre Batang Pier. He was healed in time for the opening of the season and played in all of UST's games.
- Khasim Mirza suffered a broken foot and was also hospitalized before the start of the season due to an improper diet. He missed three games in the first round of eliminations.
- Japs Cuan, in only the third game of the Tigers suffered a torn meniscus on his knee which required surgery. He was able to return in the second round while playing limited minutes.
- Allein Maliksi had an ACL injury and was only able to play in one game against the NU Bulldogs in the first round of eliminations.
- Chester Taylor and Francis Allera had sprained knees during their summer training, while rookie Jeric Fortuna suffered from flu during the season.
- Other players who missed games were Mel Gile, Chris Camus, Milan Vargas, and Khasim Mirza. They were all given suspensions by the coaching staff during their first-round game against the Adamson Falcons.

== Schedule and results ==
=== UAAP games ===
Elimination games were played in a double round-robin format and all of UST's games were televised on Studio 23 and Balls.

UAAP Season 71 game log

Elimination round: 6–8
Game	Date • Time	Opponent	Result	Record	High points	High rebounds	High assists	Location
1	Jul 5 • 4:00 pm	UE Red Warriors	L 73–78	0–1	Cruz (26)	Cruz (22)	Cuan (6)	Araneta Coliseum Quezon City
2	Jul 12 • 2:00 pm	UP Fighting Maroons	W 94–75	1–1	Ababou (20)	Cuan (9)	Cuan (7)	PhilSports Arena Pasig
3	Jul 17 • 4:00 pm	De La Salle Green Archers	L 84–85	1–2	Ababou (23)	Cruz (11)	Cuan (6)	PhilSports Arena Pasig
4	Jul 20 • 4:00 pm	FEU Tamaraws	L 65–70	1–3	Allera (20)	Allera (8)	Fortuna (4)	PhilSports Arena Pasig
5	Jul 27 • 4:00 pm	Adamson Soaring Falcons	W 86–80^{OT}	2–3	Ababou (26)	Ababou (13)	Bautista (3)	PhilSports Arena Pasig
6	Jul 31 • 2:00 pm	NU Bulldogs	W 88–77	3–3	Bautista (18)	Cruz (10)	Canlas (4)	Araneta Coliseum Quezon City
7	Aug 3 • 4:00 pm	Ateneo Blue Eagles; End of R1 of eliminations	L 57–64	3–4	Ababou (15)	Cruz (15)	Bautista (3)	Araneta Coliseum Quezon City
8	Aug 9 • 2:00 pm	Adamson Soaring Falcons	W 97–83	4–4	Cruz (29)	Cruz (15)	Fortuna (5)	PhilSports Arena Pasig
9	Aug 14 • 4:00 pm	Ateneo Blue Eagles	L 76–85	4–5	Cruz (23)	Cruz (18)	Fortuna (4)	PhilSports Arena Pasig
10	Aug 17 • 4:00 pm	FEU Tamaraws	L 69–74^{OT}	4–6	Cruz (30)	Cruz (13)	Fortuna (4)	PhilSports Arena Pasig
11	Aug 23 • 2:00 pm	NU Bulldogs	W 68–58	5–6	Allera (14)	Cruz (10)	Cuan (4)	PhilSports Arena Pasig
12	Aug 28 • 4:00 pm	De La Salle Green Archers	L 79–81	5–7	Cruz (28)	Cruz (20)	Tied (3)	Araneta Coliseum Quezon City
13	Aug 31 • 4:00 pm	UE Red Warriors	L 87–89	5–8	Cruz (21)	Cruz (23)	Cuan (4)	PhilSports Arena Pasig
14	Sep 6 • 2:00 pm	UP Fighting Maroons; End of R2 of eliminations	W 71–63	6–8	Cruz (21)	Cruz (18)	Tied (3)	Araneta Coliseum Quezon City

(#) Tournament seedings in parentheses.
All times are in UTC+08:00.
Source: inboundPASS

=== Postseason tournament ===
Postseason game log

2008 Philippine Collegiate Championship: 4–1
Game	Date • Time	Opponent	Result	Record	High points	High rebounds	High assists	Location
1	Oct 15 • 12:00 pm	St. Clare College Saints; Wildcard qualifying round	W 80–71	1–0	Allera (22)			Makati Coliseum Makati
2	Oct 16 • 1:30 pm	SFAC Doves; Wildcard qualifying round	W 64–51	2–0	Ababou (30)			Makati Coliseum Makati
3	Oct 17 • 1:30 pm	LPC Blue Lions; Wildcard qualifying round	W 69–66	3–0	Ababou (24)	Canlas (10)		Makati Coliseum Makati
4	Nov 4 • 1:30 pm	SLU Navigators; Zonal championships	W 102–52	4–0	Tied (11)	Mirza (11)	Mirza (4)	Makati Coliseum Makati
5	Nov 6 • 3:00 pm	Arellano Chiefs; Zonal championships	L 59–69	4–1	Ababou (22)			Makati Coliseum Makati

(#) Tournament seedings in parentheses.
All times are in UTC+08:00.

== UAAP statistics ==
Player	GP	GS	MPG	FGM	FGA	FG%	3PM	3PA	3P%	FTM	FTA	FT%	RPG	APG	SPG	BPG	TOV	PPG
Jervy Cruz	14		32.5	103	188	54.8	0	0	0.0	71	95	74.7	13.7	0.9	0.4	0.9	2.4	19.8
Dylan Ababou	14		28.2	74	163	45.4	14	53	26.4	58	80	72.5	6.6	1.1	0.6	0.3	3.1	15.3
Francis Allera	14		23.4	52	139	37.4	22	78	28.2	13	17	76.5	5.6	1.3	0.3	0.5	1.9	9.9
Tata Bautista	14		15.6	31	98	31.6	25	82	30.5	10	14	71.4	1.4	1.1	0.1	0.0	1.5	6.9
Khasim Mirza	11		16.5	23	74	31.1	12	41	29.3	13	19	68.4	4.0	0.6	0.2	0.1	1.6	6.5
Badong Canlas	14		21.4	32	93	34.4	0	1	0.0	23	41	56.1	4.8	1.3	0.2	0.3	1.7	6.2
Japs Cuan	10		20.3	14	31	45.2	1	6	16.7	9	20	45.0	3.8	4.0	0.6	0.0	1.7	3.8
Jeric Fortuna	14		15.9	15	56	26.8	7	23	30.4	15	24	62.5	1.7	1.7	0.7	0.0	1.9	3.7
Allein Maliksi	1		5.0	1	3	33.3	1	1	100.0	0	0	0.0	0.0	0.0	1.0	0.0	0.0	3.0
Chris Camus	12		8.1	14	40	35.0	1	11	9.1	3	4	75.0	1.9	0.3	1.0	0.3	0.3	2.7
Chester Taylor	14		11.2	14	42	33.3	0	2	0.0	2	2	100.0	2.2	0.3	0.1	0.1	0.3	2.7
Milan Vargas	7		6.1	6	14	42.9	0	1	0.0	1	5	20.0	0.9	0.6	0.0	0.0	0.6	2.0
Mel Gile	11		10.2	6	18	33.3	1	5	20.0	5	10	50.0	3.3	0.9	0.1	0.4	0.8	1.6
Carlos Fenequito	14		8.0	6	19	31.6	2	7	28.6	5	6	83.3	1.6	0.6	0.1	0.1	0.5	1.4
Melo Afuang	5		1.8	0	3	0.0	0	0	0.0	2	4	50.0	0.6	0.0	0.0	0.0	0.0	0.4
Jackson Wong	3		1.3	0	0	0.0	0	0	0.0	1	2	50.0	0.0	0.0	0.0	0.0	0.3	0.3
Total	14		40.7	391	982	39.8	81	296	27.4	231	343	67.3	48.4	12.9	4.0	2.8	17.2	78.1
Opponents	14		40.7	369	943	39.1	80	294	27.2	252	392	64.3	39.0	14.9	4.8	4.3	14.5	75.9

Legend
GP	Games played	GS	Games started	MPG	Minutes per game
FGM	Field-goal made	FGA	Field-goal attempts	FG%	Field-goal percentage
3PM	3-point field-goal made	3PA	3-point field-goal attempts	3P%	3-point field-goal percentage
FTM	Free-throw made	FTA	Free-throw attempts	FT%	Free-throw percentage
RPG	Rebounds per game	APG	Assists per game	SPG	Steals per game
BPG	Blocks per game	TOV	Turnovers per game	PPG	Points per game

Source: inboundPASS

== Awards ==
Name	Award	Date	Ref.
Jervy Cruz	Mythical team	24 Sep 2008	
Clark Bautista	Tokyo Tokyo All-rookie team	24 Sep 2008	

== Players drafted into the PBA ==
Jervy Cruz was picked fourth in the first round of the 2009 PBA draft by the Caloy Garcia-led Rain or Shine Elasto Painters team on August 2, 2009. Francis Allera was also selected in the same rookie draft as the 13th overall pick by the Yeng Guiao-coached Burger King Whoppers before getting traded to the Coca-Cola Tigers.

Badong Canlas applied for the 2010 PBA draft but went unselected. He was picked up by the Shopinas.com Clickers the following year, where he reunited with former teammates Jojo Duncil and Khasim Mirza under coach Franz Pumaren.

Year	Round	Pick	Overall	Player	PBA team
2009	1	4	4	Jervy Cruz	Rain or Shine Elasto Painters
2009	2	4	13	Francis Allera	Burger King Whoppers
2011	Signed as a free agent			Mark Canlas	Shopinas.com Clickers
