= 2009 UST Growling Tigers basketball team =

2009 UST Growling Tigers men's basketball

Record
- Elims rank: #4
- Final rank: #4
- 2009 record: 6–9 (6–8 elims)
- Head coach: Pido Jarencio (4th season)
- Assistant coaches: Senen Dueñas; Emmanuel Calipes
- Captain: Dylan Ababou (5th season)

The 2009 UST Growling Tigers men's basketball team represented University of Santo Tomas in the 72nd season of the University Athletic Association of the Philippines. The men's basketball tournament for the school year 2009-10 began on July 11, 2009 and the host school for the season was Far Eastern University.

UST finished fourth at the end of the double round-robin eliminations. They won six games against eight losses. The Growling Tigers were on back-to-back losses going into their final match of the eliminations. The De La Salle Green Archers who were a game behind them on a 5–8 win–loss record could end up in a tie and eliminate the Tigers due to a superior +13 quotient.

They went on to lose against the UE Red Warriors, but the NU Bulldogs had indirectly helped them qualify for the playoffs by beating La Salle who eventually finished the eliminations with a 5–9 record.

The Tigers made it back to the Final Four after missing out on the playoffs in Season 71 but lost to the No. 1-ranked Ateneo Blue Eagles, who had a twice-to-beat advantage over them.

They had an average winning margin of 9.3 points and an average losing margin of 12.9 points.

They experienced a 27-point blowout loss to the FEU Tamaraws and had a double-overtime loss to La Salle, both in the first round.

Team captain Dylan Ababou was named Most Valuable Player and scoring leader of the season, while Jeric Teng won the Rookie of the Year award. Ababaou was also chosen Player of the Week by the UAAP Press Corps for the duration of July 23–26 when he topscored for the Tigers with 28 points in their 92–88 win over UE.

== Roster ==
UST Growling Tigers roster
Players
Coaches

Pos.	No.	Nat.	Name	Height	Year	High School
C	5	(Philippines)	Darell John Green	6'3" (1.91m)	1st	Colegio de San Juan de Letran
SF	6	(Philippines)	Dylan Simon Ababou (C)	6'3" (1.91m)	5th	Siena College of Quezon City
PG	7	(Philippines)	Jeric Marco Fortuna	5'7" (1.7m)	2nd	De La Salle Santiago Zobel School
PF	8	(Philippines)	Carmelo Afuang	6'4" (1.93m)	2nd	San Beda College–Rizal
SG	9	(Philippines)	Clark Daniel Oliver Bautista	5'9" (1.75m)	2nd	Benedictine International School
SF	10	(Philippines)	Aljon Mariano	6'3" (1.91m)	1st	San Beda College–Rizal
PF	11	(Philippines)	Andre Charles Marquez	6'3" (1.91m)	2nd	La Salle Greenhills
PF	12	(United States)	Christopher Camus	6'4" (1.93m)	3rd	Sunny Hills High School
SF	13	(United Arab Emirates)	Hadi Rushdy	6'2" (1.88m)	1st	Colegio San Agustin – Makati
SF	14	(Philippines)	Khasim Ali Mirza	6'4" (1.93m)	5th	La Salle College Antipolo
SG	16	(Philippines)	Jeric Allen Teng	6'2" (1.88m)	1st	Xavier School
SG	17	(Philippines)	Aljohn Gil Ungria	6'1" (1.85m)	1st	Colegio de San Lorenzo
PF	18	(Philippines)	Allein Gail Maliksi	6'4" (1.93m)	4th	Camarin High School
SG	19	(Philippines)	Eduardo Aytona, Jr.	5'10" (1.78m)	1st	University of Santo Tomas
PG	20	(Philippines)	Andrew Joseph Felix	5'11" (1.8m)	1st	PAREF Southridge School
PF	21	(Philippines)	Marco Martin Cam	6'0" (1.83m)	1st	San Sebastian College-Recoletos

Head coach

- (Philippines) Alfredo Jarencio

Assistant coach(es)

- Senen Dueñas
- Emmanuel Calipes
- Ma. Genevieve Francisco
- Rodil Sablan

Strength & conditioning coach(es)

- Yi Ming Liu
- John Paul Cuan

Team manager

- Clarence Aytona
- Timmy Chong
- Rudy Yu

Legend

- (C) Team captain
- Injured

- Roster

=== Depth chart ===
Pos.	Starting 5	Bench 1	Bench 2
C	Afuang	Green	Cam
PF	Ababou	Camus	Maliksi
SF	Mirza	Mariano	Rushdy
SG	Bautista	Teng	Ungria
PG	Fortuna	Aytona	Felix

== Roster changes ==
All but two of the players from the Season 69 champion team have graduated. Season 70 MVP Jervy Cruz, point guard Japs Cuan, former team captain Francis Allera, Mel Gile, and centers Badong Canlas and Chester Taylor have all used up their playing years and the only members remaining from the team are Dylan Ababou, who is set to lead the team as this year's captain and returning forward AC Marquez.

Ababou will be joined by veterans Khasim Mirza, Chris Camus, and Allein Maliksi who has recovered from an ACL injury the previous year. The team will have eight new players composed of rookies and members of the Team B training pool.

=== Subtractions ===
Pos.	No.	Nat.	Player	Height	Year	High school	Notes
C	7	(Philippines)	Mark Angelo Canlas	6' 5"	4th	Don Bosco Academy, Pampanga	Graduated
SG	8	(Philippines)	Emilian Vargas	5' 11"	3rd		Transferred to Emilio Aguinaldo College
SF	9	(Australia)	Melchor Gile	6' 4"	4th		Graduated
SF	16	(Philippines)	Franciz Philip Allera	6' 3"	5th	Dole Philippines School	Graduated
C	17	(Australia)	Chester Lloyd Taylor	6' 4"	5th	Colegio San Agustin – Makati	Graduated
PG	18	(Philippines)	John Paul Cuan	5' 7"	5th	University of Santo Tomas	Graduated
SG	19	(Philippines)	Carlos Amador Fenequito	6' 0"	4th		Relegated to Team B
C	20	(Philippines)	Jervy Cruz	6' 4"	5th	Our Lady of the Sacred Heart College	Graduated
PG	21	(Philippines)	Jackson Wong	5' 10"	2nd	Philippine Academy of Sakya-Manila	On leave

=== Additions ===
Pos.	No.	Nat.	Player	Height	Year	High school	Notes
C	5	(Philippines)	Darell John Green	6' 3"	1st	Colegio de San Juan de Letran	Rookie
SF	10	(Philippines)	Aljon Mariano	6' 3"	1st	San Beda College–Rizal	Rookie
PF	11	(Philippines)	Andre Charles Marquez	6' 3"	2nd	La Salle Greenhills	Returning from Season 69
SF	13	(United Arab Emirates)	Hadi Rushdy	6' 2"	1st	Colegio San Agustin – Makati	Rookie
SG	16	(Philippines)	Jeric Allen Teng	6' 2"	1st	Xavier School	Rookie
SG	17	(Philippines)	Aljohn Gil Ungria	6' 1"	1st	Colegio de San Lorenzo	Promoted from Team B
SG	19	(Philippines)	Eduardo Aytona, Jr.	5' 10"	1st	University of Santo Tomas	Rookie
SG	20	(Philippines)	Andrew Joseph Felix	5' 11"	1st	PAREF Southridge School	Promoted from Team B
SF	21	(Philippines)	Marco Martin Cam	6' 0"	1st	San Sebastian College-Recoletos	Rookie

== Coaching staff ==
Beaujing Acot, the Growling Tigers' assistant coach for defense has resigned from his post. He had informed head coach Pido Jarencio of his decision through a text message a month before the UAAP tournament began. He had coached the Tigers during their preseason games in the summer but had stopped showing up to practices after.

Assistant coach Rabbi Tomacruz has also left the coaching staff to concentrate on his studies. The former UST Glowing Goldie who was in charge of liaisons and training of the Tigers' Team B has decided to pursue a career in nursing.

Acot's tasks will be divided between Jarencio and Senen Dueñas, the team's assistant coach for offense. Gina Francisco, former team captain of the UST senior women's basketball team will assume Tomacruz's duties in the team.

== Schedule and results ==
=== Preseason tournaments ===
The Nike Summer League games were aired on Studio 23.

Preseason game log

2009 Nike Summer League: 1–4
Game	Date • Time	Opponent	Result	Record	High points	High rebounds	High assists	Location
1	Apr 20 • 12:00 pm	JRU Heavy Bombers	L 55–66	0–1				FEU Gym; Manila
2	May 4 • 9:00 am	DBTC Greywolves	W 79–64	1–1	Teng (20)			FEU Gym; Manila
3 (Note: Lost by forfeit)	May 7 • 1:30 pm	NU Bulldogs	L	1–2				FEU Gym; Manila
4	May 12 • 1:30 pm	Letran Knights	L 75–81	1–3				FEU Gym; Manila
5	May 14 • 9:00 am	UP Fighting Maroons	L 62–71	1–4	Bautista (16)			FEU Gym; Manila

2009 Millennium Basketball League–Open Basketball championship: 5–2
Game	Date • Time	Opponent	Result	Record	High points	High rebounds	High assists	Location
1	May 18	RTU Blue Thunders	W 87–75	1–0				
2	May 20	Lyceum Pirates	L 67–71	1–1				Lyceum Gym; Manila
3 (Note: Won by forfeit)	Jun 3	Philippine National Police	W	2–1				
4	Jun 5	Wang's Ballclub	W 92–87	3–1				Lyceum Gym; Manila
5	Jun 8	Vescon-Cerel; End of eliminations	W 87–78	4–1				
6	Jun 15	Wang's Ballclub; Semifinal game	W 94–84	5–1	Maliksi (18)			RTU Gym; Mandaluyong
7	Jun 23	Lyceum Pirates; Championship game	L 73–91	5–1	Maliksi (17)			Lyceum Gym; Manila

(#) Tournament seedings in parentheses.
All times are in UTC+08:00.

=== UAAP games ===
Elimination games were played in a double round-robin format and all of UST's games were aired on Studio 23 and Balls.

UAAP Season 72 game log

Elimination round: 6–8
Game	Date • Time	Opponent	Result	Record	High points	High rebounds	High assists	Location
1	Jul 11 • 2:00 pm	Adamson Soaring Falcons	W 76–75	1–0	Mirza (23)	Ababou (7)	Fortuna (5)	Araneta Coliseum; Quezon City
2	Jul 16 • 2:00 pm	NU Bulldogs	W 104–89	2–0	Ababou (30)	Mirza (15)	Mirza (6)	Araneta Coliseum; Quezon City
3	Jul 19 • 4:00 pm	Ateneo Blue Eagles	L 77–93	2–1	Maliksi (20)	Mirza (8)	Tied (3)	PhilSports Arena; Pasig
4	Jul 25 • 4:00 pm	UE Red Warriors	W 92–88	3–1	Ababou (28)	Camus (14)	Bautista (8)	PhilSports Arena; Pasig
5	Aug 2 • 4:00 pm	De La Salle Green Archers	L 92–101^{2OT}	3–2	Ababou (19)	Ababou (11)	Fortuna (5)	Araneta Coliseum; Quezon City
6	Aug 6 • 4:00 pm	FEU Tamaraws	L 63–90	3–3	Teng (20)	Mirza (9)	Tied (3)	Araneta Coliseum; Quezon City
7	Aug 8 • 4:00 pm	UP Fighting Maroons; End of R1 of eliminations	W 95–85	4–3	Ababou (23)	Teng (8)	Tied (3)	Araneta Coliseum; Quezon City
8	Aug 15 • 4:00 pm	FEU Tamaraws	L 67–75	4–4	Ababou (23)	Maliksi (9)	Fortuna (5)	Araneta Coliseum; Quezon City
9	Aug 20 • 2:00 pm	UP Fighting Maroons	W 93–88	5–4	Ababou (23)	Camus (10)	Tied (6)	Araneta Coliseum; Quezon City
10	Aug 23 • 2:00 pm	Ateneo Blue Eagles	L 70–80	5–5	Ababou (19)	Mirza (12)	Fortuna (6)	Araneta Coliseum; Quezon City
11	Aug 30 • 2:00 pm	NU Bulldogs	W 79–58	6–5	Ababou (20)	Mirza (10)	Tied (4)	The Arena; San Juan
12	Sep 3 • 4:00 pm	De La Salle Green Archers	L 64–68	6–6	Ababou (19)	Mirza (12)	Fortuna (3)	Araneta Coliseum; Quezon City
13	Sep 6 • 4:00 pm	Adamson Soaring Falcons	L 64–83	6–7	Bautista (14)	Mirza (12)	Fortuna (4)	The Arena; San Juan
14	Sep 10 • 4:00 pm	UE Red Warriors; End of R2 of eliminations	L 67–77	6–8	Bautista (12)	Ababou (10)	Tied (4)	Araneta Coliseum; Quezon City

Final Four: 0–1
Game	Date • Time	Seed	Opponent	Result	Series	High points	High rebounds	High assists	Location
1	Sep 20 • 3:30 pm	(#4)	(#1) Ateneo Blue Eagles	L 64–81	0–1 (6–9)	Ababou (19)	Mirza (11)	Fortuna (4)	Araneta Coliseum; Quezon City

(#) Tournament seedings in parentheses.
All times are in UTC+08:00.
Source: inboundPASS

=== Postseason tournament ===
Postseason game log

2009 Philippine Collegiate Championship: 1–1
Game	Date • Time	Seed	Opponent	Result	Series	High points	High rebounds	High assists	Location
1	Nov 30 • 4:00 pm	(#9)	(#8) JRU Heavy Bombers; Round of 16	W 64–62	1–0	Mirza (23)			Ormoc Superdome; Ormoc City
2	Dec 4 • 2:00 pm	(#9)	(#1) Ateneo Blue Eagles; Quarterfinal game	L 72–81	1–1	Maliksi (25)			Ynares Sports Arena, Pasig

(#) Tournament seedings in parentheses.
All times are in UTC+08:00.

== UAAP statistics ==
=== Eliminations ===
Player	GP	GS	MPG	FGM	FGA	FG%	3PM	3PA	3P%	FTM	FTA	FT%	RPG	APG	SPG	BPG	TOV	PPG
Dylan Ababou	14		32.9	98	240	40.8	15	56	26.8	57	81	70.4	7.1	2.2	0.9	0.4	2.4	18.9
Khasim Mirza	14		30.3	70	182	38.5	14	62	22.6	35	55	63.6	8.8	1.8	0.6	0.8	2.9	13.5
Jeric Teng	14		23.4	49	119	41.2	14	55	25.5	48	61	78.7	4.4	1.6	0.9	0.2	2.1	11.4
Jeric Fortuna	13		31.4	35	89	39.3	21	41	51.2	14	16	87.5	3.1	4.0	1.5	0.2	2.8	8.1
Allein Maliksi	11		14.3	29	81	35.8	10	28	35.7	20	25	80.0	4.3	0.5	0.4	0.2	2.0	8.0
Tata Bautista	14		16.4	32	97	33.0	31	78	39.7	14	16	87.5	1.9	1.9	0.6	0.0	1.2	7.2
Chris Camus	14		23.6	36	74	48.6	0	3	0.0	27	39	69.2	6.7	0.9	1.6	1.5	0.9	7.1
Melo Afuang	14		14.4	19	52	36.5	1	5	20.0	8	13	61.5	2.6	0.3	0.4	0.1	1.2	3.4
Darell Green	12		7.4	8	26	30.8	0	0	0.0	4	6	66.7	1.8	0.1	0.2	0.0	0.8	1.7
Aljon Mariano	10		4.3	3	11	27.3	0	2	0.0	4	6	66.7	0.8	0.1	0.0	0.1	0.8	1.0
Eddie Aytona	12		5.2	4	15	26.7	2	9	22.2	0	0	0.0	0.3	0.5	0.0	0.1	0.7	0.8
Marco Cam	6		1.7	1	3	33.3	0	0	0.0	2	2	100.0	0.8	0.0	0.2	0.0	0.0	0.7
Andrew Felix	6		2.5	1	2	50.0	0	0	0.0	0	0	0.0	0.7	0.0	0.0	0.0	0.8	0.3
Aljohn Ungria	9		3.1	0	4	0.0	0	1	0.0	1	2	50.0	0.4	0.0	0.1	0.0	0.2	0.1
AC Marquez	4		2.8	0	2	0.0	0	0	0.0	0	0	0.0	0.8	0.0	0.3	0.3	0.8	0.0
Hadi Rushdy	3		1.0	0	0	0.0	0	0	0.0	0	0	0.0	0.0	0.0	0.0	0.0	0.0	0.0
Total	14		40.7	385	997	38.6	103	343	30.0	231	322	71.7	44.4	14.9	7.1	3.7	18.5	78.6
Opponents	14		40.7	406	993	40.9	110	375	29.3	240	399	60.2	41.2	16.5	6.1	5.1	16.8	82.1

=== Playoffs ===
Player	GP	GS	MPG	FGM	FGA	FG%	3PM	3PA	3P%	FTM	FTA	FT%	RPG	APG	SPG	BPG	TOV	PPG
Dylan Ababou	1		38	6	18	33.3	3	11	27.3	4	6	66.7	8	1	0	0	5	19
Khasim Mirza	1		31	3	12	25.0	2	8	25.0	6	8	75.0	11	2	1	1	3	14
Jeric Teng	1		22	3	11	27.3	2	6	33.3	2	2	100.0	4	0	0	1	2	10
Tata Bautista	1		22	2	7	28.6	2	6	33.3	5	8	62.5	3	0	0	0	2	9
Jeric Fortuna	1		35	3	11	27.3	0	5	0.0	1	2	50.0	6	4	2	0	4	7
Melo Afuang	1		17	2	4	50.0	0	0	0.0	0	0	0.0	4	0	1	0	0	4
Chris Camus	1		19	0	2	0.0	0	2	0.0	1	2	50.0	4	0	0	1	0	1
Allein Maliksi	1		15	0	0	0.0	0	2	0.0	0	0	0.0	5	0	0	0	5	0
Eddie Aytona	1		1	0	0	0.0	0	0	0.0	0	0	0.0	0	0	0	0	0	0
Total	1		40.0	19	69	27.5	9	40	22.5	19	28	67.9	43	8	4	3	21	64
Opponents	1		40.0	30	59	50.8	6	16	37.5	14	21	66.7	40	21	14	3	19	81

Legend
GP	Games played	GS	Games started	MPG	Minutes per game
FGM	Field-goal made	FGA	Field-goal attempts	FG%	Field-goal percentage
3PM	3-point field-goal made	3PA	3-point field-goal attempts	3P%	3-point field-goal percentage
FTM	Free-throw made	FTA	Free-throw attempts	FT%	Free-throw percentage
RPG	Rebounds per game	APG	Assists per game	SPG	Steals per game
BPG	Blocks per game	TOT	Turnovers per game	PPG	Points per game

Source: inboundPASS

== Awards ==
Name	Award	Date	Ref.
Team	Millennium Basketball League runners-up	23 Jun 2009	
Allein Maliksi	Millennium Basketball League MVP	23 Jun 2009	
Dylan Ababou	Season MVP	1 Oct 2009	
Dylan Ababou	Mythical team	1 Oct 2009	
Dylan Ababou	Scoring champion	1 Oct 2009	
Dylan Ababou	Player of the Week	23–26 Jul 2009	
Jeric Teng	Rookie of the year	1 Oct 2009	
Jeric Fortuna	Best 3-point field goal percentage	1 Oct 2009	

== Players drafted into the PBA ==
Khasim Mirza was picked in the second round and was selected 16th overall in the 2010 PBA draft by the Ryan Gregorio-led Meralco Bolts on August 29, 2010. Allein Maliksi and Dylan Ababou, meanwhile, applied for the 2011 PBA draft and were selected eighth and tenth overall respectively, both in the first round on August 28, 2011.

Year	Round	Pick	Overall	Player	PBA team
2010	2	6	16	Khasim Mirza	Meralco Bolts
2011	1	8	8	Allein Maliksi	Petron Blaze Boosters
2011	1	10	10	Dylan Ababou	Barako Bull Energy
