= 2023 UST Growling Tigers basketball team =

Basketball team in the Philippines

2023 UST Growling Tigers men's basketball

Record
- Elims rank: #8
- 2023 record: 2–12
- Head coach: Pido Jarencio (9th season)
- Assistant coaches: Japs Cuan; Bam Ledesma
- Captain: Paul Manalang (3rd season)

The 2023 UST Growling Tigers men's basketball team represented the University of Santo Tomas in the 86th season of the University Athletic Association of the Philippines. The men's basketball tournament for the academic year 2023–24 began on September 30, 2023, and the host school for the season was the University of the East.

The Tigers finished eighth and last at the end of the double round-robin eliminations for the second straight year with a 2–12 record after going through a 19-game losing streak that dated back from Season 85. They won only their opening game on October 1, 2022 and then went through a pile of defeats that continued to the current season, where they lost six straight games in the first round of eliminations.

They had an average winning margin of 6.0 points and an average losing margin of 16.5 points. Five of their losses were by blowouts, with one against the Ateneo Blue Eagles by 20 points in the first round, and two in each round against the De La Salle Green Archers and the UP Fighting Maroons, by 20, 31, 31, and 25 points, respectively. Their first round game against the Adamson Soaring Falcons resulted to a three-point overtime loss.

Nic Cabañero once again led the league in scoring with an average of 16.8 points per game. He scored 25 points in their first round game against La Salle, and finished with more than 20 points in three of their other games. He was ranked 8th in the players' MVP tally with 60.1 statistical points at the end of the second round of eliminations.

== Roster ==
The Growling Tigers came out with a list of 18 players in the days leading to the start of the UAAP tournament. Sophomore guard Soysoy Escobido and former Tiger Cubs playmaker Jethro Escoto did not make the cut to the official 16-man roster.

UST Growling Tigers roster
Players
Coaches

Pos.	No.	Nat.	Name	Height	Year	High School
SG	0	(Philippines)	Ivan Lazarte	6'2" (1.88m)	2nd	Malayan High School of Science
PG	1	(Philippines)	Bevir Ivanne Calum	5'11" (1.8m)	1st	St. Louis School–Don Bosco
SG	2	(Philippines)	Kylle Matthew Magdangal	5'11" (1.8m)	2nd	Marina High School
C	3	(Philippines)	Prudencio Adrian Esmeña III	6'6" (1.98m)	1st	National University Nazareth School
PF	4	(Philippines)	Christian Manaytay	6'4" (1.93m)	3rd	Sacred Heart School–Ateneo de Cebu
SF	8	(United States)	Vincent Gabriel Ventulan	6'4" (1.93m)	5th	Fort Pierce Central High School
SG	9	(Philippines)	Nicael Dominie Cabañero	6'3" (1.91m)	3rd	University of Santo Tomas
PF	10	(Philippines)	Mark Angelo Crisostomo	6'5" (1.96m)	1st	Sta. Teresita National High School
C	11	(Philippines)	Joachim Eddie Laure	6'5" (1.96m)	2nd	National University Nazareth School
SF	12	(Philippines)	Saentis James Moore	6'1" (1.85m)	1st	Arellano University High School
PF	14	(Philippines)	Mark Allen Llemit	6'3" (1.91m)	1st	University of Santo Tomas
SG	15	(Philippines)	Kenji Trey Duremdes	6'3" (1.91m)	2nd	National University Nazareth School
SF	17	(Philippines)	Miguel Pangilinan	6'2" (1.88m)	4th	National University Nazareth School
PG	22	(Philippines)	Paul Matthew Manalang (C)	5'10" (1.78m)	3rd	National University Nazareth School
C	23	(Senegal)	Adama Faye (injured)	6'8" (2.03m)	2nd	Le Pionnier
SF	24	(Philippines)	Jonathan Ralf Gesalem	6'1" (1.85m)	3rd	Sacred Heart School–Ateneo de Cebu

Head coach

- (Philippines) Alfredo Lorenzo Jarencio

Assistant coach(es)

- John Paul Cuan
- Juben Ledesma
- Lester Andrew del Rosario
- Jeric Marco Fortuna
- Alfredo Jarencio II
- Ian Joseph Herrera

Strength & conditioning coach(es)

- Reil Vinard Espino
- Ronald Christopher Cua
- Jose Avelino Vergara

Team manager

- Waiyip Chong
- Eric Ang

Legend

- (C) Team captain
- Injured

- [ Roster]

=== Depth chart ===
Pos.	Starting 5	Bench 1	Bench 2
C	Crisostomo	Laure	Esmeña
PF	Manaytay	Llemit	Ventulan
SF	Pangilinan	Duremdes	Gesalem
SG	Cabañero	Lazarte	Moore
PG	Manalang	Calum	Magdangal

== Roster changes ==
Four players have departed the Growling Tigers' roster, with Jamba Garing and Ian Herrera graduating, and Richi Calimag and Royce Mantua transferring. Soysoy Escobido and Kendall Valentin were cut from the team's final lineup. Mantua, Escobido, and Valentin had suited up in the Tigers' preseason games, but Mantua decided to move to Adamson in September. Calimag left as early as February to transfer to San Beda in the NCAA.

Garing averaged 3.6 points, 4.2 rebounds, and 1.2 assists per game in 15.7 minutes last season, while Calimag and Mantua averaged 3.5 and 3.3 points, and 2.9 and 2.3 rebounds in 14.6 and 10.5 minutes, respectively. Herrera saw limited action, playing behind Adama Faye, for 3.7 minutes per game.

"The remaining players from last year's roster are doing well in practice. I've been overseeing their training since Monday (January 30). So far, there haven't been new players coming in, but we are hopeful for the arrival of recruits."

— Japs Cuan, assistant coach

In early February, then incoming assistant coach and former Growling Tiger Japs Cuan oversaw the team's training and observed positive development in the performance of their holdovers from Season 85. The coaching staff was still anticipating the arrival of new recruits that time.

Replacing the six players were Angelo Crisostomo, Ivanne Calum, and Thirdy Esmeña, from UST's training pool, rookies SJ Moore and Mark Llemit, and Vince Ventulan, a one-and-done Filipino American recruit from Florida.

Moore was ranked 15th among the National Basketball Training Center's top 24 high school players for 2023, and was named Most Valuable Player in the All-star game of the NBTC National Finals. The high-leaping swingman was a one-and-done high school player from the Arellano Braves, who averaged 19.0 points, 8.6 rebounds, 1.3 assists, and 1.3 blocks per game in the NCAA Juniors tournament. He led the Braves in ending the Letran Squires' winning streak in the first round with a double-double of 24 points and 18 rebounds, on top of four shot blocks in February. Moore made his commitment to play for the UST Growling Tigers official on March 24, 2023.

UST Tiger Cub forward Mark Llemit committed to UST on April 13, 2023. He was named the 19th best high school player by the NBTC and had led the Tiger Cubs to the semifinals of both the UAAP and the Division 1 of the NBTC National Finals. Llemit had earlier scored a career-high 27 points against the UPIS Junior Maroons to lead his team to the Final Four in the UAAP Boys division in February. Both Moore and Llemit are eligible for five playing years starting in Season 86.

=== Departures ===
Pos.	No.	Nat.	Player	Height	Year	High school	Notes
PF	1	(Philippines)	Recaredo Calimag Jr.	6' 4"	2nd	Diamond Bar High School	Transferred to San Beda University
C	5	(Philippines)	Ian Joseph Herrera	6' 6"	3rd	La Salle Greenhills	Graduated
SF	12	(Australia)	Royce Deakin Mantua	6' 4"	3rd	Far Eastern University–Diliman	Transferred to Adamson University
SF	18	(Philippines)	Vincent Raymund Escobido	6' 2"	2nd	University of Santo Tomas	Relegated to Team B
SG	20	(Philippines)	JC Alvin Garing	5' 9"	3rd	Divine Word College of Legazpi	Graduated
SG	33	(United States)	Kendall Xavier Valentin	6' 2"	2nd	Adamson University	Relegated to Team B

=== Acquisitions ===
Pos.	No.	Nat.	Player	Height	Year	High school	Notes
PG	1	(Philippines)	Bevir Ivanne Calum	5' 11"	1st	St. Louis School–Don Bosco	Promoted from Team B
C	3	(Philippines)	Prudencio Adrian Esmeña III	6' 6"	1st	National University Nazareth School	Promoted from Team B
SF	8	(United States)	Vincent Gabriel Ventulan	6' 4"	5th	Fort Pierce Central High School	Transferred from Ave Maria University
PF	10	(Philippines)	Mark Angelo Crisostomo	6' 5"	1st	Sta. Teresita National High School	Promoted from Team B
SF	12	(Philippines)	Saentis James Moore	6' 1"	1st	Arellano University High School	Rookie
PF	14	(Philippines)	Mark Allen Llemit	6' 3"	1st	University of Santo Tomas	Rookie

=== Recruiting class ===
Name	Pos.	Height	High school	Hometown	Commit date	Ref.
SJ Moore	SF	6' 1"	Arellano University High School	Baclayon	24 Mar 2023	
SJ Moore	2023 NBTC Top 24 rank: 15 (All-Star game participant with Team Hustle; All-Star game MVP)					
SJ Moore	2023 SLAM Rising Stars Challenge participant (with Team Punks)					
Mark Llemit	PF	6' 3"	University of Santo Tomas	Laak, Davao de Oro	13 Apr 2023	
Mark Llemit	2023 NBTC Top 24 rank: 19 (National Finals #2 seed, Division 1 semifinalist with UST; All-Star game participant with Team Heart)					
Mark Llemit	2023 SLAM Rising Stars Challenge participant (with Team Punks)					
Ivanne Calum	PG	5' 11"	St. Louis School–Don Bosco	Dumaguete	22 Aug 2022	
Ivanne Calum	2019 NBTC Top 24 rank: N/A (National Finals #22 seed, Division 2 quarterfinalist with SLS–Don Bosco)					
The National Basketball Training Center (NBTC) is a grassroots program in the Philippines that develops and ranks outstanding players from high schools who compete in a five month-long nationwide youth basketball tournament. The program has enabled local coaches to recruit skilled players to play collegiate basketball.
Since 2014, the SLAM Rising Stars Classic holds a yearly exhibition game that serves as a platform to showcase the talents of twenty-four of the best high school players from Metro Manila in front of coaches, scouts and media.

== Coaching changes ==
On January 26, 2023, The Varsitarian, UST's student publication, reported that Bal David had resigned as the team's head coach, just six months after taking on the position. The Tigers have had two coaching changes since the training bubble controversy in 2020. David replaced Jino Manansala and was appointed coach with only two months of preparation before the start of the 85th season of the UAAP. The team managed to get only a single win in the 14-game tournament under him.

"Let's just put it this way. I'm destined to fail."

— Bal David, former head coach

As their Season 85 campaign ended, David had hoped to coach for one more season and continue UST's rebuilding in the offseason, but only two months after, the 50-year old mentor had tendered his resignation. When asked why he was stepping down, David alluded to the manner in which the basketball program was handled the past year.

The former Growling Tiger playmaker, who is best remembered for his championship-winning free throw during the 1994 UAAP Finals against La Salle, was in for a rough homecoming when he accepted the offer to coach the 2022 team. The Tigers were coming off a 3–11 win–loss campaign that was riddled with blowout losses, one that even broke the league record for the most lopsided outcome, when they got beaten by Ateneo by 50 points. Next came the decommitment of their blue chip recruits, when the Filipino American bigman Gani Stevens transferred to the University of the East, and the high-scoring Kean Baclaan's move to National University, as well as the ineligibility issues of two of their veterans, when Sherwin Concepcion and Bryan Santos were both ruled to have exceeded the league's age limit.

One week later, UST officially announced the appointment of returning head coach Pido Jarencio. Jarencio resigned in 2013 after leading the Tigers to back-to-back runner-up finishes when he accepted an offer to coach the NorthPort Batang Pier team in the Philippine Basketball Association. He signed a three-year contract on February 13, 2023 in the presence of the Institute of Physical Education and Athletics (IPEA) director Fr. Rodel Cansancio and UST rector Fr. Richard Ang. Also present in the signing were former Letran Knights' coach and Jarencio's Northport associate Bonnie Tan, who was named team consultant of the Growling Tigers; former Knights' team managers Waiyip Chong and Eric Ang, who were set to serve as UST's new managers; and an all-UST alumni coaching staff.

On July 10, 2023, the UST basketball program formally received support from San Miguel Corporation when they named Alfrancis Chua, former Glowing Goldie and current sports director of SMC, as the Tigers' Special Assistant to the Rector for Sports.

== Schedule and results ==
=== Preseason tournaments ===
The rebuilding Growling Tigers opted to not participate in the preseason tournaments, and instead went to Korea to train for eleven days by playing tune-up games against professional teams from the Korean Basketball League, and against top collegiate teams.

"In terms of preparation, I can say that the team is on track. We are okay. We did not join the preseason tournaments because we were still putting in place our system, for the players to be able to learn and adjust. I have observed each player, I saw them improve during training."

— Pido Jarencio, Growling Tigers head coach

When the Tigers came back to the country, they joined the Breakdown Basketball Invitational tournament, where they fielded two teams composed of their blue chip recruits who are undergoing the residency period, as well as members of their training pool who were fighting for slots in the 16-man UAAP roster.

The Breakdown Basketball Invitational games were played in a single round-robin format and all of UST's games were broadcast via livestream on Sulit Breakdown Basketball's Facebook page.

Preseason game log

67th Araw ng Maramag Friendship Game: 1–0
Game	Date • Time	Opponent	Result	Record	High points	High rebounds	High assists	Location
1	Jul 2 • 5:00 pm	IBACM Bukidnon All-stars	W 81–78	1–0				Maramag Municipal Gym Bukidnon

2023 Breakdown Basketball Invitational Cup–Team 1 games: 5–3
Game	Date • Time	Opponent	Result	Record	High points	High rebounds	High assists	Location
1	Jul 9 • 4:00 pm	San Sebastian Stags	W 74–61	1–0	Lazarte (17)	Crisostomo (8)	Calum (5)	Moro Lorenzo Gym Quezon City
2	Jul 16 • 3:00 pm	Fatima Phoenix	W 78–52	2–0	Tied (18)	Osang (15)	Paranada (4)	Moro Lorenzo Gym Quezon City
3	Jul 22 • 2:30 pm	UST–Team 2	W 67–58	3–0	Robinson (21)	Osang (9)	Tied (2)	Moro Lorenzo Gym Quezon City
4	Jul 30 • 3:00 pm	MLQU Stallions	W 53–45	4–0	Escobido (15)	Esmeña (5)	Napeñas (7)	Moro Lorenzo Gym Quezon City
5	Aug 13 • 3:00 pm	FEU Tamaraws	L 59–75	4–1	Magtulis (10)	Andrews (10)	Paranada (5)	Moro Lorenzo Gym Quezon City
6	Aug 26 • 3:00 pm	LCCM Blue Royals	L 70–75	4–2	Lane (14)	Osang (7)	Paranada (5)	Moro Lorenzo Gym Quezon City
7	Sep 9 • 4:00 pm	MCU Purple Owls	W 97–71	5–2	Robinson (27)	Robinson (11)	Melecio (4)	Moro Lorenzo Gym Quezon City
8	Sep 10 • 2:00 pm	Arellano Chiefs	L 79–82	5–3	Estacio (21)	Estacio (11)	Escobido (4)	Moro Lorenzo Gym Quezon City

2023 Breakdown Basketball Invitational Cup–Team 2 games: 3–5
Game	Date • Time	Opponent	Result	Record	High points	High rebounds	High assists	Location
1	Jul 16 • 1:00 pm	FEU Tamaraws	L 53–60	0–1	Tounkara (12)	Tounkara (12)	Bonus (2)	Moro Lorenzo Gym Quezon City
2	Jul 22 • 2:30 pm	UST–Team 1	L 58–67	0–2	Tied (18)	Tounkara (17)	Bonus (4)	Moro Lorenzo Gym Quezon City
3	Jul 30 • 1:30 pm	LCCM Blue Royals	L 38–51	0–3	Tounkara (15)	Tounkara (11)	Tied (1)	Moro Lorenzo Gym Quezon City
4	Aug 6 • 5:00 pm	MCU Purple Owls	W 70–54	1–3	Tounkara (18)	Tounkara (9)	Bonus (4)	Moro Lorenzo Gym Quezon City
5	Aug 13 • 5:00 pm	MLQU Stallions	W 66–58	2–3	Sahali (11)	Tounkara (9)	Sahali (5)	Moro Lorenzo Gym Quezon City
6	Aug 26 • 1:30 pm	Arellano Chiefs	L 62–80	2–4	Tounkara (15)	Tounkara (17)	Tied (3)	Moro Lorenzo Gym Quezon City
7	Sep 9 • 5:30 pm	San Sebastian Stags	W 73–54	3–4	Valentin (24)	Tounkara (10)	Sahali (6)	Moro Lorenzo Gym Quezon City
8	Sep 10 • 5:00 pm	Fatima Phoenix	L 62–78	3–5	Tounkara (13)	Kitane (8)	Tied (2)	Moro Lorenzo Gym Quezon City

(#) Tournament seedings in parentheses.
All times are in UTC+08:00.

=== UAAP games ===
Elimination games were played in a double round-robin format and all of UST's games were televised on One Sports and the UAAP Varsity Channel.

UAAP Season 86 game log

Elimination round: 2–12
Game	Date • Time	Opponent	Result	Record	High points	High rebounds	High assists	Location
1	Sep 30 • 2:11 pm	UE Red Warriors	L 70–80	0–1	Cabañero (18)	Tied (8)	Tied (2)	Mall of Asia Arena Pasay
2	Oct 4 • 3:02 pm	Adamson Soaring Falcons	L 76–79^{OT}	0–2	Pangilinan (18)	Crisostomo (7)	Llemit (5)	Mall of Asia Arena Pasay
3	Oct 7 • 4:05 pm	De La Salle Green Archers	L 71–91	0–3	Cabañero (25)	Laure (10)	Tied (2)	Araneta Coliseum Quezon City
4	Oct 11 • 4:35 pm	NU Bulldogs	L 69–87	0–4	Manaytay (18)	Manaytay (9)	Manalang (4)	Mall of Asia Arena Pasay
5	Oct 14 • 4:40 pm	UP Fighting Maroons	L 79–110	0–5	Cabañero (24)	Cabañero (8)	Calum (3)	Mall of Asia Arena Pasay
6	Oct 18 • 10:08 am	Ateneo Blue Eagles	L 77–97	0–6	Cabañero (21)	Tied (7)	Manalang (7)	Mall of Asia Arena Pasay
7	Oct 22 • 1:07 pm	FEU Tamaraws; End of R1 of eliminations	W 68–62	1–6	Cabañero (23)	Manaytay (11)	Duremdes (5)	Mall of Asia Arena Pasay
8	Oct 25 • 11:02 am	De La Salle Green Archers	L 69–100	1–7	Cabañero (13)	Llemit (6)	Cabañero (6)	Mall of Asia Arena Pasay
9	Oct 28 • 2:04 pm	UE Red Warriors	L 73–86	1–8	Pangilinan (20)	Tied (6)	Duremdes (5)	Mall of Asia Arena Pasay
10	Nov 4 • 2:10 pm	Adamson Soaring Falcons	L 53–61	1–9	Manaytay (13)	Calum (10)	Calum (4)	Mall of Asia Arena Pasay
11	Nov 8 • 11:03 am	Ateneo Blue Eagles	L 59–67	1–10	Cabañero (16)	Tied (10)	Cabañero (7)	Araneta Coliseum Quezon City
12	Nov 11 • 4:29 pm	NU Bulldogs	L 65–76	1–11	Manaytay (14)	Cabañero (10)	Manalang (5)	Araneta Coliseum Quezon City
13	Nov 15 • 1:24 pm	UP Fighting Maroons	L 61–86	1–12	Tied (14)	Manaytay (9)	Duremdes (4)	Mall of Asia Arena Pasay
14	Nov 18 • 2:03 pm	FEU Tamaraws; End of R2 of eliminations	W 57–53	2–12	Manaytay (12)	Tied (9)	Manalang (4)	Araneta Coliseum Quezon City

(#) Tournament seedings in parentheses.
All times are in UTC+08:00.
Source: Imperium Technology

== UAAP statistics ==
Player	GP	GS	MPG	FGM	FGA	FG%	3PM	3PA	3P%	FTM	FTA	FT%	RPG	APG	SPG	BPG	TOV	PPG
Nic Cabañero	14	13	32.7	84	232	36.2	17	67	25.4	50	94	53.2	6.4	2.4	1.1	0.0	2.7	16.8
Christian Manaytay	14	13	25.6	55	133	41.4	6	21	28.6	50	64	78.1	7.3	0.9	1.1	0.8	3.3	11.9
Migs Pangilinan	14	9	25.6	43	134	32.1	26	88	29.5	20	30	66.7	3.4	1.1	1.1	0.2	0.9	9.4
Ivanne Calum	14	5	13.9	22	54	40.7	8	19	42.1	19	28	67.9	2.4	1.5	1.0	0.1	1.3	5.1
Echo Laure	14	4	18.2	27	60	45.0	0	3	0.0	8	14	57.1	4.6	1.2	0.4	0.4	1.2	4.4
Gelo Crisostomo	14	6	15.3	29	57	50.9	0	1	0.0	2	5	40.0	4.6	0.2	0.2	0.5	0.6	4.3
Kenji Duremdes	14	4	15.9	24	56	42.9	5	17	29.4	4	10	40.0	3.6	1.9	1.0	0.4	1.3	4.1
Paul Manalang	14	9	21.2	18	65	27.7	4	33	12.1	11	15	73.3	2.6	2.7	0.6	0.0	1.6	3.6
SJ Moore	11	2	7.9	9	23	39.1	0	4	0.0	8	18	44.4	1.4	0.4	0.3	0.3	0.5	2.4
Vince Ventulan	10	0	6.7	9	18	50.0	2	7	28.6	3	6	50.0	1.3	0.5	0.3	0.0	0.5	2.3
Mark Llemit	14	0	9.1	6	23	26.1	1	10	10.0	11	14	78.6	1.8	0.9	0.4	0.0	0.6	1.7
Ivan Lazarte	14	3	5.2	8	28	28.6	0	5	0.0	5	13	38.5	0.8	0.3	0.1	0.0	0.6	1.5
JJ Gesalem	11	1	4.6	4	19	21.1	4	18	22.2	1	2	50.0	0.1	0.1	0.0	0.0	0.4	1.2
Kylle Magdangal	9	0	3.6	2	9	22.2	1	6	16.7	0	0	0.0	0.3	0.3	0.1	0.0	0.1	0.6
Adama Faye	2	1	5.3	0	2	0.0	0	0	0.0	1	2	50.0	1.5	0.0	0.0	0.0	0.0	0.5
Thirdy Esmeña	6	0	3.0	0	0	0.0	0	0	0.0	0	0	0.0	0.3	0.0	0.3	0.0	0.3	0.0
Total	14		40.4	340	913	37.2	74	299	24.7	193	315	61.3	41.5	14.1	7.9	2.6	16.6	67.6
Opponents	14		40.4	409	1,006	40.7	136	422	32.2	181	275	65.8	47.5	20.9	8.7	4.9	15.4	81.1

Legend
GP	Games played	GS	Games started	MPG	Minutes per game
FGM	Field-goal made	FGA	Field-goal attempts	FG%	Field-goal percentage
3PM	3-point field-goal made	3PA	3-point field-goal attempts	3P%	3-point field-goal percentage
FTM	Free-throw made	FTA	Free-throw attempts	FT%	Free-throw percentage
RPG	Rebounds per game	APG	Assists per game	SPG	Steals per game
BPG	Blocks per game	TOV	Turnovers per game	PPG	Points per game

Source: Imperium Technology

== Summary of games ==
Even as the Growling Tigers finished dead last in Season 85, ESPN Philippines ranked them in their preseason assessment just below the top four powerhouse teams of UP, Ateneo, La Salle, and NU, with a B-minus rating. UST had been serious in turning their fortunes around, when they welcomed the return of Jarencio, the coach who gave the community their last championship in 2006, and paved the way to finalizing the team's partnership with San Miguel Corporation. With it came the needed recruitment of high school standouts and blue chip players.

"In assuming the leadership role, it's important that I don't stop in motivating my teammates. There's pressure (in doing so), but I'm excited with the process."

— Nic Cabañero, third-year veteran

Last season, Nic Cabañero became a primary player for the team following the departure of several veterans. He led the league in scoring, while he and Adama Faye were the team's statistical leaders. This season, he is focusing on leadership within the roster.

=== First round ===
UE Red Warriors

	1	2	3	4	Total
UST	21	13	14	22	70
UE	22	24	18	16	80

The Tigers suffered a ten-point opening day loss against the UE Red Warriors, and extended their losing streak from the past season to 14. UE led by as many as 19 points in the third quarter, but UST fought back with Cabañero and Mark Llemit spearheading a 13–4 run at the 2:03 mark of the fourth period to come within eight at 67–75. The Warriors then converted a triple and got Cabañero to commit his fifth foul after a charge was called on him against UE's Jack Cruz-Dumont. Dumont made both his free throws for the final count of 70–80.

Earlier in the first quarter, the Tigers rallied back from a 9–22 deficit with 12 unanswered points until the buzzer sounded for a 21–22 count. UE recovered to end the half with a 12-point lead. Cabañero, Christian Manaytay, and Migs Pangilinan finished in double figures with 18, 15, and 10 points, respectively.

Coach Pido Jarencio attributed the loss to the team's poor shot selection when they made only 21 of their 62 field goal attempts, and committed 20 turnovers. On top of that, Adama Faye, their Senegalese center sat out midway in the game after complaining of back pains, causing the team to lag on defense.

"We had a bad start. We weren't making our shots, and we weren't playing defense. And then Adama Faye got injured. We tried playing our local bigs, but it's different from having a big foreign student-athlete. They (UE) had a big lead, and the momentum was with them, but in the second half, we were able to apply our defense. We were able to limit their scoring, especially against their guards, but the problem was that we weren't making our own shots in transition. We've made defensive stops, but our offense wasn't there. We couldn't get any momentum going, and that was the story of the game."

— Pido Jarencio

Adamson Soaring Falcons

	1	2	3	4	OT	Total
UST	13	23	15	17	8	76
Adamson	20	20	12	16	11	79

"I give credit to UST, and to Coach Pido and his coaching staff. They really made it hard for us today even without their foreign student-athlete."

— Nash Racela, Adamson head coach

UST lost in overtime against the Adamson Soaring Falcons and dropped to a 0–2 record. After the Falcons' Joem Sabandal hit a jumper in the last 5 seconds of regulation, Cabañero countered with a layup with 2.2 seconds left to tie the score at 68–all and send the game into overtime. The Tigers, however, could not score after, allowing the Falcons to orchestrate a 9–2 run. Cabañero then made back-to-back three point shots, the second of which was a running contested shot, to bring UST to within one at 76–77, with under 30 seconds remaining. Team captain Paul Manalang fouled Adamson's Mathew Montebon to stop the clock, who then made both free throws to increase the lead to three. With 2.7 seconds left, Pangilinan threw a shot from near midcourt, but missed the potential game-tying three. The game ended with the Tigers losing, 76–79. Pangilinan led the team in scoring with 18 points, 12 coming from four three-point shots. Cabañero and Angelo Crisostomo chipped in 17 and 10 points, respectively. They were without Faye, who was reported to have been continuously suffering from back pains.

De La Salle Green Archers

	1	2	3	4	Total
La Salle	22	25	26	18	91
UST	11	25	14	21	71

UST remained winless after losing by 20 points against La Salle. The Tigers have not won against the Archers for the past eight years, dating back to the second round of the 2015 season when they swept their opponents in both rounds of eliminations. They got dominated in the second half after maintaining an 11-point deficit from the first and second quarter. The Archers went on a 19–4 run to increase their lead to 26, with 3:37 left in the third period. It was a one-man show for the Tigers, as Cabañero forced his shots to finish with 25 points, while committing 8 turnovers in the process. No other player from UST scored in double digits, with Pangilinan and Manaytay contributing only 8 and 7 points. The absence of Faye proved to be a challenge for the team, both offensively and defensively.

"We have to move on. It was a bad game, both offensively and defensively. We hesitated. Without Adama, it's challenging because we played with him for almost eight months, and then he got injured. It will need a significant adjustment for the team because he was our dominating center."

— Pido Jarencio

NU Bulldogs

	1	2	3	4	Total
NU	30	18	18	21	87
UST	14	12	20	23	69

"Our shots are not falling, but I don't think it's time to press the panic button yet. Honestly, I still believe in the team and our players. I think, eventually, we will get one (win)."

— Japs Cuan

The Tigers fell victim to the NU Bulldogs' strong first quarter, as they allowed their opponents to score 30 points to end the period on a 16-point deficit. UST never tasted the lead throughout the game, and even trailed by as many as 28 points at one point. Manaytay finished with 18 points and 9 rebounds, with the heavily-guarded Canañero adding 16 points, as they ended up losing for the 17th straight time since the first round of Season 85.

With Faye's continued absence, the Tigers got outrebounded, 25–45. When asked of their Senegalese player's status, Assistant coach Japs Cuan did not give a definite timeline for his return, while referring to the sophomore center's back issues. Faye, who led the league in rebounds in Season 85, has only suited up twice this season on limited minutes.

UP Fighting Maroons

	1	2	3	4	Total
UST	24	21	14	20	79
UP	28	31	35	16	110

UST suffered a 31-point blowout loss at the hands of the league-leading UP Fighting Maroons. The Tigers led early in the game and ended the first quarter with a 4-point deficit at 24–28, but were dominated in the second period when the Maroons poured in 31 points to extend their lead to 14, going into the halftime break. Their opponents' defense prevented them from scoring in the second half and were at one point trailing by as many as 37 points. In the end, UST allowed UP to score 110 points, the most made by a UAAP team since the 2018 season, when, coincidentally, it was also the Tigers who yielded a 69–110 loss against La Salle. Cabañero and Manaytay finished with 24 and 23 points, respectively, to topscore for the still-winless Tigers.

Ateneo Blue Eagles

	1	2	3	4	Total
Ateneo	17	23	32	25	97
UST	10	23	28	16	77

The Growling Tigers ended up in another 20-point loss, this time against the Ateneo Blue Eagles. UST could not get their shots to drop, scoring only 10 points in the first quarter to yield a 7-point deficit to Ateneo. They were able to maintain the distance by keeping pace with their opponents, scoring 23 points in the second period, and even managed to come within four points, at 58–62 behind Crisostomo's undergoal plays. It was in the second half when the Eagles got going and subjected UST to a 17–3 run. The Tigers went on a fouling spree, sending Ateneo to the free throw line fourteen times. The Eagles' Joseph Obasa, at one point made four successive three-point plays off fouls by Crisostomo and Echo Laure. Three Tigers ended up in double-digit scoring, with Cabañero, Manaytay, and Pangilinan finishing with 21, 17, and 11 points, respectively.

With the latest loss, the Tigers have surpassed their longest losing streak back in 2017, when they went winless for 17 straight games, beginning in their four-game skid from the second round of Season 79 until the last game of Season 80, when they defeated the UE Red Warriors for a 1–13 record. They are currently on a 19-game losing spell after winning only their opening game against Adamson in Season 85.

FEU Tamaraws

	1	2	3	4	Total
UST	22	16	17	13	68
FEU	17	17	16	12	62

UST finally ended their losing streak at the expense of the FEU Tamaraws. Cabañero scored 11 of his team-high of 23 points in the third quarter, highlighted by his basket at the buzzer after getting blocked by his taller defenders, securing a rebound, and scoring a putback while getting fouled for a three-point play. He converted his free throw to give the Tigers a 55–50 lead going into the final period.

They were able to increase their lead to eleven, midway in the fourth quarter, with Pangilinan hitting a triple. The Tamaraws went scoreless for seven minutes, until Xyrus Torres and L-Jay Gonzales got their shots to drop, cutting UST's lead to six at 65-59 in the last 2:47. Manaytay finished with a double-double of 10 points and 11 rebounds to add to Cabañero's 23 points. Kenji Duremdes also had a productive outing, hauling down 10 rebounds to go with his 7 points, 5 assists, and 2 shot blocks.

=== Second round ===
The Growling Tigers ended the first round of eliminations with a 1–6 record for the second year in a row. But unlike last year, where the team's long losing streak of 13 games can be attributed to their lack of preparation, this year's squad even boasted of a strong backer and a coach who has already given the school a championship in the past. Things did not go as expected, though, as the Tigers went on to lose their first six games and extended their win drought to an unprecedented 19 games.

Even with their breakthrough win over FEU in the last day of the first round of eliminations, UST was still at the bottom of the standings, trailing FEU and UE's 2–5 records. While it is mathematically possible for them to still make it to the playoffs, it will be a difficult task as history has shown that no team that has won only one game in the first round ever reached the Final Four. The highest rank that a UAAP team with a first-round single win got was a fifth-place finish, with Adamson pulling it off twice, in Seasons 72 and 84, and with UP in Season 79.

In order for UST to continue winning their remaining games in the second round, they have to hope for better offensive performances than they have shown in the earlier round. Cabañero, last season's scoring leader, is still this year's leader with 20.6 points per game, and is supported by Manaytay's 13.9 and Pangilinan's 9.6-point averages. But outside of the three players, no one in the team has scored more than 6.9 points per game, with consistency in shooting being a problem that hounded them throughout the first round. The Tigers ranked fifth in offense among the eight competing teams, with 72.9 points per game, against the combined 86.6-point average of their opponents.

Adama Faye's continued absence has shown in their lack of rebounding, and, while they were able to duke it out with FEU, the other stronger teams will be tough to overcome in the second round. Faye led the league in rebounds with an average of 12.2 boards per game last year, but has only hauled down a total of three rebounds in the two games that he played in this season. The team's average of 40.4 rebounds per game ranks them last in the league.

De La Salle Green Archers

	1	2	3	4	Total
La Salle	29	23	23	25	100
UST	21	17	11	20	69

The Tigers were once again dealt with a 31-point blowout loss, this time by La Salle, to begin the second round of eliminations. UST had engaged the Archers in a shootout, trading baskets early in the game, as they ended the first period by an eight-point deficit, at 21–29. La Salle's Kevin Quiambao and Evan Nelle led an attack to break away from the Tigers to end the half at 52–38. UST was not able to keep up as they allowed their opponent to breach the 100-point barrier for the second time this season. Cabañero and Manaytay led again in scoring with 13 and 10 points, respectively.

UE Red Warriors

	1	2	3	4	Total
UST	19	27	7	20	73
UE	29	26	12	19	86

UE ended their five-game losing streak at the expense of the Tigers. The Warriors clamped down on their defense, as UST was held scoreless for more than seven minutes in the third quarter, and were only able to score 7 points after trailing UE by 9 points at the half. The Warriors had gone on a 10–0 run until Vince Ventulan ended their scoring drought at 2:42 after firing a triple for a 49–65 score. Down from 16 points in the fourth quarter, Cabañero and Pangilinan shot three straight three-pointers to come within 10 at 59–69. Three minutes later, the Warriors exploded with a 14–4 run as UST found themselves in a 20-point deficit. Pangilinan, Cabañero, and Ivanne Calum led the team in scoring with 20, 18, and 11 points, respectively.

Adamson Soaring Falcons

	1	2	3	4	Total
UST	20	12	8	13	53
Adamson	19	16	13	13	61

The Tigers' loss against Adamson has sent them on the brink of getting eliminated from Final Four contention after incurring their ninth defeat of the season. Trailing at 40–50 at the start of the fourth period, Manaytay, Ivan Lazarte, and Calum connived for a six-minute 10–2 run to come within two points at 50–52. UST then ran out of firepower as the Falcons bombarded them with three consecutive triples to increase the lead to 11, with 2:49 remaining in the game. Cabañero had an off game, managing to score only 9 points on a 3-of-15 field goal conversion. Manaytay, who recently celebrated his birthday, was the only player to score in double digits for the Tigers with 13. Two other players in Calum and Lazarte scored 9 points, as Manalang, Pangilinan, and Duremdes contributed 8, 4, and 1 point, respectively.

Prior to their game against the Falcons, The Varsitarian reported that Adama Faye is officially out of the Growling Tigers' roster, as he was set to fly out to his home country in Senegal to recover from his back injury. UST officials had earlier said that the team will release an announcement on the status of the second-year player. Suiting up in only two games this season, it was evident that the Tigers have missed Faye's inside presence as they got outrebounded by their opponents in seven out of the nine games they have played so far.

Ateneo Blue Eagles

	1	2	3	4	Total
UST	12	17	14	16	59
Ateneo	22	21	7	17	67

Ateneo ended their three-game losing streak at the expense of UST, as the Tigers were eliminated from Final Four contention with their 10th loss of the season. The Eagles started the game with a tough defense on UST, forcing them to commit turnovers, as they trailed 4–11, midway in the opening quarter. Cabañero, though guarded heavily, kept the Tigers' offense going, as he scored a three-point play to end the quarter at 12–22.

A 9–0 rally by Ateneo's Kai Ballungay and Jared Brown saw UST's deficit increase to 18, at 16–34, but the Eagles committed back-to-back turnovers and allowed Migs Pangilinan to score two fastbreak layups. The first half ended with the Tigers trailing, 29–43. The third period began with a Ballungay putback to increase the Eagles' lead by two more points, before going on a six-minute scoring drought. UST was able to capitalize with a 10–0 run that was highlighted by a goaltending call on Ateneo's Joseph Obasa. The Eagles' Sean Quitevis ended their spell after scoring on a reverse layup. The Tigers answered with back-to-back baskets from Kenji Duremdes at the 1:57 mark to pull the team within four points, at 43–47. Ateneo's Chris Koon was able to sneak in a three-pointer as the third quarter buzzer sounded, for a 50–43 lead. The Eagles managed to score only seven points, on 3-of-22 shooting in the quarter.

Ateneo made another run to start the final period, scoring seven unanswered points in the first two minutes, causing the Tigers to call a timeout. After the break, UST was able to answer with a 10–2 rally of their own, to come within six, at 53–59, following a split by Cabañero at the free throw line. A layup by the Eagles' Raffy Celis off a baseline drive at the 1:56 mark increased their lead to eight, as Pangilinan and Mason Amos traded threes for a 56–64 score. Manaytay fouled out in the next possession after a moving screen was called on him. Koon was able to convert on the other end on an awkward shot to push Ateneo's lead up to ten, at 66–56. Kylle Magdangal then fired a triple and the Tigers went for a quick foul to stop the time. Celis made both free throws to seal the game for a 67–59 count. The Blue Eagles extended their win streak over the Growling Tigers to 17 games starting from Season 78.

"I was really pleased today with our defense. We had some breakdowns in giving Nic (Cabañero) opportunities that he shouldn’t get. He's just a handful to try and defend (against) and to hold him down to 16 (points) on a 33 percent shooting is a pretty good job. Generally speaking, I think the essence of our defense was pretty good."

— Tab Baldwin, Ateneo head coach

Cabañero was three assists shy of a triple-double, tallying 16 points, 10 rebounds, and 7 assists. Pangilinan added 13 points, while Duremdes finished with 9 points and 9 rebounds. Manaytay, despite compiling 10 rebounds and 2 blocks, had an off game in offense as he scored only 2 points on a 1-of-6 shooting clip, while committing a team-high of 7 turnovers. The Tigers struggled with ball control, notably in the firsr half, as they turned the ball over 19 times, resulting to 23 transition points for Ateneo.

"We didn't shoot the ball well, but we did enough offensively to win the game. I thought we generated a lot of good shots. The more we missed, the more UST was determined to stick to the zone, and the saving grace was really our offensive rebounding."

— Tab Baldwin

They outrebounded Ateneo, 50–48, but lost in the offensive boards, 18–23. Seldom-used Ateneo rookie Raffy Celis collared 9 offensive boards out of his total of 11 rebounds.

NU Bulldogs

	1	2	3	4	Total
UST	16	12	10	27	65
NU	20	15	18	23	76

The Growling Tigers lost anew against the NU Bulldogs, 65–75, as they continued to struggle late in the second round of eliminations. Christian Manaytay led UST in scoring eight unanswered points early in the first quarter to pull his team to a three-point lead, after trailing at 4–9. That was the only time for the Tigers to taste the lead in the game, as the Bulldogs countered with an 11–4 run to end the period.

They began the second quarter with a 4–1 run from being down, 16–20. The Bulldogs buckled down to work and went on another 14–8 run. They limited Cabañero to only 6 points, on a 2-of-20 field goal at the half with their tight defense. Even as the King Tiger finished with a double-double of 13 points and 10 rebounds, they could not keep up with NU, as they trailed by as many as 18 points, midway in the fourth quarter. The Tigers attempted a mini-rally early in the period when Cabañero and Manaytay scored bask-to-back baskets to trim down the lead to 11, at 46–57, after being down by 15 at the end of the third quarter. The Bulldogs' PJ Palacielo countered with a tightly-contested undergoal shot to put an end to their uprising. Kean Baclaan followed it with an and-1 play, and Omar John made his own conversion for a 64–46 score and put the Tigers away for good, with still 4:39 left in the game. UST was forced into multiple turnovers, committing 14, and only shooting 35 percent as the Bulldogs tightened their defense in the second half. One of the few highlights in UST's game was a two-handed slam dunk by rookie SJ Moore in the closing seconds of the match.

UP Fighting Maroons

	1	2	3	4	Total
UST	18	14	15	14	61
UP	24	20	25	17	86

UST lost again against the UP Fighting Maroons by another blowout, as they dropped to a 1–12 record and remained winless in the second round of eliminations. Even without their head coach, as it was reported that Pido Jarencio had to sit out due to an illness, the Tigers were able to start strong and led early in the opening minutes, scoring 9 against UP's 2 points. It was then that the Maroons substituted their starters and took control with a 22–9 run that had UST trailing 18–24 to end of the first quarter.

Seldom-used UP players Chicco Briones and Cyril Gonzales led their team to break away at the half for a 44–32 lead. The Tigers trailed by as many as 29 points late in the fourth period, even as the Maroons rested their starters and allowed their bench to score 73 out of the team's total of 86 points.

Cabañero and Manaytay both finished with 14 points, with Pangilinan adding 13 to topscore for the Tigers.

FEU Tamaraws

	1	2	3	4	Total
FEU	9	15	13	16	53
UST	18	14	15	10	57

The Growling Tigers swept FEU in their two-game elimination matchup with a 57–53 win to end their season on a high note. They took advantage of the Tamaraws' struggle to score in the opening minutes of the game and went on to lead in double-digits for multiple times in the match. With a fifteen-point, 44–29 lead in the third quarter, the Tigers fell prey to an FEU rally, with L-Jay Gonzales spearheading a 21–10 run that continued to the final period. His teammate Jorick Bautista hit a three-point shot to cap the rally and pull the Tamaraws to a single-possession deficit, under one minute left on the clock.

UST's point production became scarce that they had to rely on free throw conversions from Cabañero, Vince Ventulan, and Paul Manalang. Manalang, in particular, gave his team back their two-possession lead when he split his charities to pull the Tigers ahead at 57–53, with 16.9 seconds remaining.

Manaytay and Pangilinan finished the game in double-digits with 12 and 10 points, respectively. Cabañero managed to score only 8 points, on a 2-of-10 field goal.

"From the get-go, we were aggressive and we stayed composed throughout the game. In the endgame, of course, we knew they were going to make a comeback and I give credit to the players. The composure was there, and they didn't lose hope. Maybe they felt enough was enough. They just got tired of all the losing and that it was the right time to get our second win of the season."

— Pido Jarencio

With Faye sitting out, and eventually leaving the team, the Tigers were left to play their smaller centers and forwards, while they struggled at the post in scoring and defending. They were also suffering from the lack of a quality point guard to direct their offense. It was supposed to be better this year, as team captain Manalang was the only playmaker, prompting then-head coach Bal David to convert Cabañero to quarterbacking duties in Season 85. The arrival of Ivanne Calum was a welcome addition to relieve Manalang, but an injury to the veteran point guard in the offseason forced Calum to play extended minutes, and by the time the UAAP tournament commenced, he was already burned out.

"It's been hard. We're really pushing the guys, but you can see how tired they are. In our rotations, you can see how Coach (Pido) is looking for a player to help out. We really need consistency from our players in order for us to win. Everyone really has to contribute."

— Japs Cuan

Cabañero ended up carrying the team again, playing for more than thirty minutes per game. It was evident that the third-year guard had struggled physically during their second-round games, scoring under 10 points on two occasions, on a 3-of-15 and 2-of-10 shooting. Outside the trio of Cabañero, Manaytay, and Pangilinan, the rest of the team had to battle inconsistency in making their shots.

"We really cannot fault Nic here, because he has really been trying his best. We tried playing him off the bench, and then back as a starter, to shake things up. We were trying to think outside the box, but the results that we want do not materialize."

— Japs Cuan

As the season prematurely ended for the Tigers, the team is now looking forward to Season 87, hoping the new recruits will be able to incorportate themselves into Jarencio's system.

== Players drafted into the PBA ==
JJ Gesalem has graduated from his academics but still had a year remaining on his playing eligibility with UST. In February 2024, he decided to turn professional and signed with the Quezon City Capitals in the Maharlika Pilipinas Basketball League. He later applied for the 122-strong 2025 PBA draft and was selected in the fifth round by the NorthPort Batang Pier as the 50th overall pick on September 7, 2025.

Year	Player	Round	Pick	Overall	PBA team
2025	JJ Gesalem	5	4	50	NorthPort Batang Pier
