= 1991 UST Glowing Goldies basketball team =

Philippine University Basketball team

1991 UST Growling Tigers men's basketball

UAAP Season 54 semifinalist

Record
- Elims rank: #T–2
- Final rank: #3
- 1991 record: 11–4 (11–3 elims)
- Head coach: Aric del Rosario (5th season)
- Assistant coaches: Mady Tabora
- Captain: Billy Reyes (3rd season)

The 1991 UST Glowing Goldies men's basketball team represented University of Santo Tomas in the 54th season of the University Athletic Association of the Philippines. The men's basketball tournament for the school year 1991–92 began on July 20, 1991, and the host school for the season was the University of the Philippines.

Despite the 7-foot EJ Feihl's departure from the team, the Goldies began their season on a five-game winning streak. They ended the double round-robin eliminations tied with the FEU Tamaraws at second place in the standings with 11 wins against three losses. They lost against the Tamaraws in the playoff for the second Finals berth, 89–95. UST had trailed FEU by as much as 23 points in the first half and were outrebounded, 23–35.

Second-year forward Dennis Espino was selected to Mythical team at the tournament's presentation of awards.

== Roster ==
UST Glowing Goldies roster
Players
Coaches

Pos.	No.	Nat.	Name	Height	Year	High School
PF	5	(Philippines)	Edmund Reyes	6'3" (1.91m)	2nd	Good Shepherd Academy
SG	8	(Philippines)	Patrick Roy Fran	6'0" (1.83m)	3rd	Aquinas School
SG	9	(Philippines)	Rudolf Belmonte	5'11" (1.8m)	3rd	San Beda College
PG	10	(Philippines)	Beltran Reyes (C)	5'10" (1.78m)	4th	Ateneo de Manila
SG	13	(Philippines)	Danilo Abugan	6'1" (1.85m)	1st	–
PG	14	(Philippines)	Bethune Tanquingcen	5'9" (1.75m)	2nd	Philippine Cultural High School
C	16	(Philippines)	Dennis Espino	6'6" (1.98m)	2nd	Holy Angel University
SF	17	(Philippines)	Generoso Tengco, Jr.	6'0" (1.83m)	3rd	University of Santo Tomas
PG	18	(Philippines)	Vincent Kenneth Favis	5'11" (1.8m)	3rd	La Salle Greenhills
SG		(Philippines)	James Sichon	5'10" (1.78m)	4th	University of St. La Salle
C		(Philippines)	Joaquin Dindo Torres	6'4" (1.93m)	3rd	University of Santo Tomas
PF		(Philippines)	Renato Cabaluna	6'3" (1.91m)	3rd	University of Santo Tomas
PF		(Philippines)	Reynaldo Evangelista	6'4" (1.93m)	3rd	St. Peter’s College of Ormoc
SF		(Philippines)	Norman Loyao	–	1st	–

Head coach

- (Philippines) Januario del Rosario

Assistant coach(es)

- Amadito Tabora

Legend

- (C) Team captain
- Injured

- Roster

=== Depth chart ===
Pos.	Starting 5	Bench 1	Bench 2
C	Espino	Torres
PF	E. Reyes	Cabaluna	Evangelista
SF	Tengco	Loyao
SG	Belmonte	Fran
PG	B. Reyes	Favis	Tanquingcen

== Roster changes ==
=== Subtractions ===
Pos.	No.	Nat.	Player	Height	Year	High school	Notes
C	11	(Philippines)	Edward Joseph Feihl	7' 0"	2nd	University of Santo Tomas	Transferred to Adamson University
C		(Philippines)	Peter Tioseco	6' 7"	2nd	Lourdes School of Mandaluyong	Transferred to Mapúa Institute of Technology
C		(Philippines)	Benjie Bendillo				Transferred to De La Salle University

=== Additions ===
Pos.	No.	Nat.	Player	Height	Year	High school	Notes
PF	5	(Philippines)	Edmund Reyes	6' 3"	2nd	Good Shepherd Academy	Returning from Season 52
SG	13	(Philippines)	Danilo Abugan	6' 1"	1st		Rookie
PF		(Philippines)	Reynaldo Evangelista	6' 4"	3rd	St. Peter’s College of Ormoc	Transferred from the Visayas State College of Agriculture
SF		(Philippines)	Norman Loyao		1st		Rookie

== Schedule and results ==
=== UAAP games ===
Elimination games were played in a double round-robin format. All games were aired on RPN 9 by Silverstar Sports.

UAAP Season 54 game log

Elimination round: 11–3
Game	Date • Time	Opponent	Result	Record	High points	High rebounds	High assists	Location
1	Jul 20 • 1:00 pm	FEU Tamaraws	W 114–84	1–0				Araneta Coliseum; Quezon City
2	Jul 27 • 4:30 pm	Ateneo Blue Eagles	W 80–60	2–0	E. Reyes (15)			Loyola Center; Quezon City
3	Jul 31 • 4:30 pm	NU Bulldogs	W 87–64	3–0				
4	Aug 3	Adamson Soaring Falcons	W 103–101	4–0				
5	Aug 10 • 2:00 pm	UE Red Warriors	W 74–72	5–0	Belmonte (18)			
6	Aug 14	De La Salle Green Archers	L 83–100	5–1				Loyola Center; Quezon City
7	Aug 17	UP Fighting Maroons; End of R1 of eliminations	L	5–2				
8	Aug 24	FEU Tamaraws	W	6–2				
9	Aug 28	Adamson Falcons	W	7–2				
10	Aug 31	De La Salle Green Archers	L 80–85	7–3				Loyola Center; Quezon City
11	Sep 7	NU Bulldogs	W	8–3				
12	Sep 11	Ateneo Blue Eagles	W	9–3				
13	Sep 14	UE Red Warriors	W	10–3				
14	Sep 21	UP Fighting Maroons; End of R2 of eliminations	W	11–3				

Playoff for second seed: 0–1
Game	Date • Time	Seed	Opponent	Result	Series	High points	High rebounds	High assists	Location
1	Oct 2		FEU Tamaraws	L 89–95	0–1 (11–4)	Espino (23)			Loyola Center; Quezon City

(#) Tournament seedings in parentheses.
All times are in UTC+08:00.
Source: Google News Archives

=== Postseason tournaments ===
Postseason game log

PRISAA Basketball Championship—Northern NCR leg: 7–0
Game	Date • Time	Opponent	Result	Record	High points	High rebounds	High assists	Location
1	Dec 16	CCP Bobcats	W 71–52	1–0	Espino (20)			Rizal Memorial Coliseum Manila
2	Dec 17	NCBA Wildcats	W 88–67	2–0	Tied (14)			Rizal Memorial Coliseum Manila
3	Dec 18	MMC Bisons	W 81–71	3–0	Fran (22)			Rizal Memorial Coliseum Manila
4	Dec 19	EARIST Red Fox	W 93–65	4–0	Cabaluna (18)			Rizal Memorial Coliseum Manila
5	Dec 20	Perpetual Altas	W 87–73	5–0	B. Reyes (24)			Rizal Memorial Coliseum Manila
6	Dec 22	PUP Mighty Maroons	W 100–85	6–0	Espino (30)			Rizal Memorial Coliseum Manila
7	Dec 23	FEU Tamaraws; Championship game	W 88–81	7–0	Espino (29)			Rizal Memorial Coliseum Manila

National Students Basketball Championships—NCR leg: 8–0
Game	Date • Time	Opponent	Result	Record	High points	High rebounds	High assists	Location
1	Jan 12	MMC Bisons	W 109–94	1–0	Belmonte (23)			Rizal Memorial Coliseum Manila
2	Jan 16	UE Red Warriors	W 96–80	2–0	Belmonte (16)			Rizal Memorial Coliseum Manila
3	Jan 19	San Sebastian Stags	W 86–62	3–0	Espino (21)			Rizal Memorial Coliseum Manila
4	Jan 20	UP Fighting Maroons	W 89–75	4–0	Loyao (18)			Rizal Memorial Coliseum Manila
5 (Note: Romel David is with the Team B training pool)	Jan 21	DOMC Cobras	W 123–52	5–0	David (25)			Rizal Memorial Coliseum Manila
6	Jan 26	Mapúa Cardinals	W 105–96	6–0	Cabaluna (22)			Rizal Memorial Coliseum Manila
7	Jan 30	Adamson Soaring Falcons; Semifinal round	W 90–78	7–0	E. Reyes (20)			Arellano Taft Gym Pasay
8	Jan 31	FEU Tamaraws; Championship game	W	8–0				Arellano Taft Gym Pasay

(#) Tournament seedings in parentheses.
All times are in UTC+08:00.

== Awards ==
Name	Award	Date	Ref.
Team	PRISAA North NCR champions	23 Dec 1991	
Team	National Students NCR champions	31 Jan 1992	
Team	UAAP 2nd runners-up	3 Oct 1991	
Dennis Espino	Mythical team	3 Oct 1991	

== Players drafted into the PBA ==
Billy Reyes was drafted 20th overall in the third round of the 1994 PBA draft by the Chot Reyes-led Coney Island Ice Cream Stars on January 16, 1994.

Year	Round	Pick	Overall	Player	PBA team
1994	3	4	20	Billy Reyes	Coney Island Ice Cream Stars
