= Pido Jarencio =

Filipino basketball player and coach (born 1964)

UST Growling Tigers
- Title: Head coach / Board governor
- League: UAAP / PBA

Personal information
- Born: September 5, 1964 (age 62) Sigma, Capiz, Philippines
- Listed height: 5 ft 10 in (1.78 m)
- Listed weight: 170 lb (77 kg)

Career information
- High school: Quirino High School (Quezon City)
- College: UST
- PBA draft: 1986: Elevated
- Drafted by: Magnolia Cheese Makers
- Playing career: 1986–2001
- Position: Point guard / shooting guard
- Number: 6, 25
- Coaching career: 2006–present

Career history

Playing
- 1986–1987: Magnolia Cheese Makers/San Miguel Beermen
- 1988: Great Taste Instant Milk
- 1989: Purefoods Hotdogs
- 1990–1991: Pop Cola/Sarsi Sizzlers/Swift Mighty Meaty Hotdogs
- 1992–1998: Ginebra/Tondeña 65 Rhum Masters/Gordon's Gin Boars
- 1999–2000: Tanduay Rhum Masters
- 2001: Pop Cola Panthers

Coaching
- 2006–2013: UST
- 2006–2012: Petron Blaze Boosters (assistant)
- 2012–2013: San Miguel Beermen (ABL, assistant)
- 2014–2015, 2017–2022: GlobalPort / NorthPort Batang Pier
- 2023–present: UST

Career highlights
- As player: 3× PBA champion (1985 PBA Reinforced Conference (guest team), 1987 PBA Reinforced Conference, 1997 PBA Commissioner's Cup); PBA Most Improved Player (1992); 2× PBA All-Star (1992–1993); As head coach: UAAP champion (2006); PCCL champion (2012); UAAP Coach of the Year (2006); PCCL Coach of the Year (2012); As assistant coach: 2× PBA champions (2009 Fiesta, 2011 Governors')
Medals
Men's basketball
Representing Philippines
ABC Championship
Gold medal – first place	1985 Kuala Lumpur	Team
SEA Games
Gold medal – first place	1985 Bangkok	Team

Alfredo Lorenzo "Pido" Mendoza Jarencio (born September 5, 1964) is a Filipino basketball coach and former professional player. He is the head coach for the UST Growling Tigers of the University Athletic Association of the Philippines (UAAP). He had coached UST previously from 2006 to 2013; he won the UAAP title in his first season and was named UAAP Coach of the Year. He is also the board governor for the Terrafirma Dyip of the Philippine Basketball Association (PBA).

He played college basketball for the UST Growling Tigers and played in the PBA from 1986 to 2001. Known as "the Fireman", he distinguished himself as one of the league's best three-point shooters, especially in clutch situations. He has won three PBA championships: the 1985 Reinforced Conference with guest team Northern Cement, the 1987 Reinforced Conference with the San Miguel Beermen, and the 1997 Commissioner's Cup with Barangay Ginebra San Miguel (then Gordon's Gin Boars). He spent the longest stint of his professional career with Ginebra (six seasons, 1992–1998) with whom he won the PBA Most Improved Player award in 1992 and was a two-time PBA All-Star. Other PBA franchises he played for were Purefoods, Pop Cola, Tanduay, and Great Taste. After retiring from playing, he became a coach and manager.

== Early life ==
Jarencio hails from Sigma, Capiz, where his father, Benedicto Mariveles Jarencio, a civil engineer, ran a construction business. He, along with his four siblings grew up in Project 3 in Quezon City.

His first sport was volleyball where he was once named Athlete of the Year while still in grade school. He attended high school at Quirino High School in Quezon City, where he began to play basketball.

== Collegiate & amateur career ==
Jarencio played college basketball for the UST Glowing Goldies during the 1980s under coaches Charlie Badion and Aric del Rosario.

He was a walk-in applicant for the Glowing Goldies after unsuccessfully trying out for Turo Valenzona's Trinity College team in the NCAA. He was able to secure a roster spot in UST, besting 200 other aspirants for a slot reserved for only four freshmen players.

He once scored 50 points in a game against the National University Bulldogs in 1982, during the elimination round of UAAP Season 45. He scored 48 points during the 1984 UAAP finals against the University of the East Warriors after exchanging baskets with season MVP Allan Caidic, who in turn finished the game with 46 points.

Jarencio played in the Philippine Amateur Basketball League from 1984 to 1986 and was part of the San Miguel franchise team, Magnolia Ice Cream. The team, under the name Lagerlite Beer finished as runners-up to ESQ Marketing in the 1985 Invitational Cup.

The team changed their name back to Magnolia Ice Cream and they exacted revenge on ESQ by beating them in the finals of the 1986 Founder's Cup.

Jarencio was included in the lineup of the Danding Cojuangco-backed Northern Cement basketball team that won the 1985 Asian Basketball Confederation Championship in Kuala Lumpur, Malaysia.

The NCC team which had two American players in their roster also competed as a guest team and won the 1985 PBA Reinforced Conference title.

== Professional career ==
Jarencio turned professional in 1986, joining the Magnolia Cheese Makers who had taken leave from the PBA when the events related to the EDSA revolution unfolded. The team, under new owners returned in the Third Conference after signing up Jarencio together with 7 of his teammates from the NCC national team. He won his first championship as a professional player in the Reinforced Conference the following year.

He is considered a journeyman, having played in six different teams in his 16 years in the PBA. In his first six years, Jarencio had played as a reserve until he became part of the starting lineup in Ginebra.

After being traded to Great Taste from San Miguel Beer in 1988, he was given longer playing minutes as backup to starting point guard Bernie Fabiosa. On June 30, 1988, during the All-Filipino Conference. Jarencio threw a buzzer-beating jumper to win the game against Purefoods, 102–100.

Ironically, he was traded to Purefoods the following year and was again relegated to a reliever role, playing behind point guards Al Solis and Dindo Pumaren. He was released to the expansion draft and was picked up by Pop Cola in the off-season. He became the second leading scorer for the team, behind Elmer Reyes, with a 12.1 point per game average in the 35 games that he played.

Jarencio's break came when he joined Sonny Jaworski's team and became Ginebra's starting point guard. He had been traded from Swift in 1992 and became the leading scorer for the team that season. He had an average of 18.6 points per game. He scored 45 points against 7 Up, 44 against Swift and scored over 30 points in four other contests during the season. He was awarded the PBA's Most Improved Player at the end of the season.

He won his third championship in the PBA in the 1997 Commissioner's Cup with Ginebra, which had used the name Gordon's Gin Boars at the start of the season. He made 8 three point shots in the semifinals to beat San Miguel in two overtime periods. He then made 7 three point shots in their finals match against Alaska.

Jarencio had amassed 6,121 career points after his last active year in 2001, ranking him 49th in the PBA All Time Scoring Leaders list.

=== Selected statistics ===
Year	Team	Conference	GP	FGM	FGA	FG%	FTM	FTA	FT%	PPG
1985	Northern Cement Corporation	Reinforced	7	13	19	.684	3	7	.429	4.1
1986	Magnolia Cheese Makers	Open	3	2	7	.286	2	2	1.000	2.0

Year	Team	GP	MPG	FG%	3P%	FT%	RPG	APG	SPG	BPG	PPG
1990	Sarsi Sizzlers	35	26.5	.497		.731	2.3	2.8	0.7	0.1	12.1
1992	Ginebra San Miguel	42	33.3	.525	.360	.769	1.9	5.7	0.6	0.3	18.6

Year	Team	Opponent	Date	Season high
1991	Tondeña 65 Rhum Masters	Shell Rimula X	Jun 21	39
1992	Ginebra San Miguel	7 Up	Oct 15	45^{a}
1993	Ginebra San Miguel	San Miguel Beermen	May 9	38
1995	Ginebra San Miguel	Sta. Lucia Realtors	Mar 28	32
1998	Gordon's Gin Boars	Alaska Milkmen	Mar 31	34
1999	Tanduay Rhum Masters	Formula Shell Zoom Masters	Mar 12	36

^{a}Career high
Source: PBA Records & Oddities

== Coaching career ==
=== UST Growling Tigers ===
Jarencio was appointed head coach of the UST Growling Tigers on February 21, 2006. He replaced Nel Parado whose contract expired on February 15. Parado coached the Tigers for two years, and was only able to secure 4 wins in each season.

On his 16th season as a player in the PBA, his team, the Pop Cola Panthers was disbanded after the PBA franchise was sold by RFM Corporation to Coca-Cola Bottlers Philippines, Inc. This left Jarencio with no PBA team to play in and was put on inactive status. During those times, he joined the San Miguel All-Stars touring team that played goodwill games around the country.

In 2003, Jarencio had gone to UST to accompany his daughter in her enrollment and bumped into Institute of Physical Education and Athletics (IPEA) director Fr. Ermito de Sagon. Aric del Rosario had just resigned and the school was searching for their new head coach. Jarencio had no prior coaching experience so he declined Fr. de Sagon's invitation. Gina Francisco, the UST senior women's basketball team captain when Jarencio was still playing for the Glowing Goldies, persisted in convincing him to apply for the head coach position. She referred him to UST athletics moderator Mike Silbor who arranged an interview with Fr. de Sagon. He passed the interviews and was later given a one-year contract with an understanding for him to rebuild the Growling Tigers' basketball program for the next three years.

In his first season as head coach in 2006, he led the Growling Tigers in defeating the heavily favored Ateneo Blue Eagles 2–1 to win the UAAP Season 69 title, something that has eluded his playing career as a Glowing Goldie.

The Growling Tigers got into the UAAP finals two more times, in 2012, and in 2013, but they had not been successful in duplicating their feat in 2006. In eight seasons with Jarencio as coach, UST missed the final four on just two occasions, in 2008, and in 2010. The team also won the PCCL championship in 2012.

Jarencio resigned in 2013, at the end of UAAP Season 76, after failing to win the championship against La Salle. He had accepted an offer to coach a PBA team near the end of the first conference that year. He ended his eight-year coaching stint for the Tigers with an overall record of 56 wins against 54 losses in the elimination round, 10–8 in the postseason, highlighted by six final four and three finals appearances.

==== GlobalPort/NorthPort ====
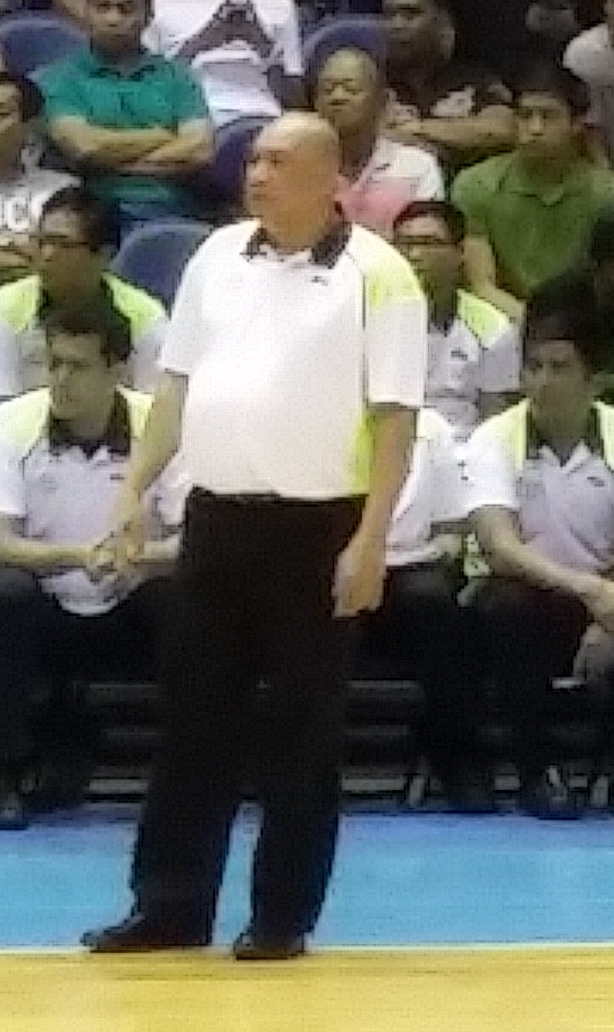
Jarencio in 2015

During the years that Jarencio was coaching the Growling Tigers, he was also an assistant coach of the San Miguel Beermen in the PBA. An altercation with Yeng Guiao, his former coach at Swift became a defining low point in his coaching career.

In game six of the 2006 Philippine Cup semifinals series between San Miguel and Red Bull, Guiao threw an elbow at San Miguel player Dondon Hontiveros, who was backing up in his direction after converting a three-point jump shot. Out of anger, Jarencio, charged towards the Red Bull bench and almost came into contact with Guiao, which happened in front of the referees.

Guiao was ejected from the game after incurring two technical fouls and was later handed down a one-game suspension and a P30,000 fine. Jarencio was called for one technical foul and was later meted a P50,000 fine for improper contact with an official and also a one-game suspension.

On January 9, 2014, before the start of the Commissioner's Cup, GlobalPort officially signed Jarencio to a two-year contract. He took over interim coach Richie Ticzon, who earlier replaced head coach Junel Baculi prior to his firing at the start of the season.

In his first conference as GlobalPort coach, he posted a 1–8 win–loss record. He ended his first season as a PBA coach with a 2–16 win–loss record.

He was fired towards the end of the 2014–15 PBA Philippine Cup despite doubling his win total in his first two conferences in the pro league at 4 wins and 5 losses. He remained with the team as a consultant. On March 31, 2015, Jarencio was reappointed as the head coach of the Batang Pier.

In 2013, it was reported that Jarencio will take over as coach of the Barako Bull Energy Boosters, but contract negotiations fell through.

Jarencio also coached the House of Representatives Solons team in the UNTV Cup from 2016 to 2018.

In January 2023, NorthPort named Jarencio as their team manager, replacing Bonnie Tan, who then became their interim head coach.

On November 22, 2023, NorthPort lost 112–104 to the NLEX Road Warriors. During the game, NLEX import Thomas Robinson was involved in several collisions and had exchanged words with Jarencio in the third quarter. After the game, Jarencio and Robinson cursed each other in the tunnel. Jarencio then shouted "I'll shoot you later!" and had to be restrained by his players, security, and Commissioner Willie Marcial. The next day, Jarencio apologized to Marcial and explained that he was carried away by his emotions. He also planned to apologize to Robinson. A week later, the PBA imposed a ₱20,000 fine on Jarencio and gave him a warning. Meanwhile, Robinson's contract was terminated by NLEX citing "his taking an unplanned vacation and skipping team practices."

=== Post-PBA playing career ===
Jarencio played in an exhibition game in the UNTV Cup 3rd Season. The game was a PBA Legends charity match in support of Samboy Lim's medical recovery.

== Career as sports administrator ==
He was appointed commissioner of the Community Basketball Association (CBA) in 2018. He is also the commissioner of the Metro Basketball Tournament (MBT), a tournament for boys aged 16 years and below in Metro Manila.

He was also the commissioner of NAASCU for the 17th season of their basketball tournament.

== Personal life ==
Jarencio was featured in the 1990 Fernando Poe Jr. film, "May Isang Tsuper Ng Taxi" (Pablo S. Gomez, Pablo Santiago, FPJ Productions, Inc.) in a cameo role along with other PBA players. They played a group of cab drivers who came to aid FPJ and engaged the villains in a fistfight.

He ran and lost in the 2004 elections as Councilor in the 3rd district of Manila.

== Coaching record ==
=== College ===
Season	Team	Eliminations				Playoffs				
Season	Team	W	L	PCT	Finish	PG	W	L	PCT	Results
2006	UST	6	6	.500	3rd	6	5	1	.833	Champion
2007	UST	8	6	.571	4th	2	1	1	.500	Stepladder round 1
2008	UST	6	8	.429	5th	—	—	—	—	Eliminated
2009	UST	6	8	.429	4th	1	0	1	.000	Semifinals
2010	UST	4	10	.286	7th	—	—	—	—	Eliminated
2011	UST	8	6	.571	4th	1	0	1	.000	Semifinals
2012	UST	10	4	.714	2nd	3	1	2	.333	Finals
2013	UST	8	6	.571	4th	5	3	2	.600	Finals
2023	UST	2	12	.143	8th	—	—	—	—	Eliminated
2024	UST	7	7	.500	3rd	1	0	1	.000	Semifinals
2025	UST	8	6	.571	3rd	1	0	1	.000	Semifinals
Totals		65	73	.471		19	10	9	.526	1 championship

Source: UST–IPEA: UAAP Teams

=== Professional ===
Season	Conference	Team	G	W	L	PCT	Finish	PG	W	L	PCT	Results
2013–14	Commissioner's	GlobalPort	9	1	8	.111	10th/10	—	—	—	—	Eliminated
2013–14	Governors'	GlobalPort	9	1	8	.111	10th/10	—	—	—	—	Eliminated
2014–15	Philippine	GlobalPort	11	5	6	.455	8th/12	1	0	1	.000	Quarterfinals
2017–18	Philippine	NorthPort	11	5	6	.455	7th/12	1	0	1	.000	Quarterfinals
2017–18	Commissioner's	NorthPort	11	5	6	.455	8th/12	2	1	1	.500	Quarterfinals
2017–18	Governors'	NorthPort	11	2	9	.182	11th/12	—	—	—	—	Eliminated
2019	Philippine	NorthPort	11	5	6	.455	7th/12	1	0	1	.000	Quarterfinals
2019	Commissioner's	NorthPort	11	9	2	.818	2nd/12	2	0	2	.000	Quarterfinals
2019	Governors'	NorthPort	11	5	6	.455	8th/12	6	3	3	.500	Semifinals
2020	Philippine	NorthPort	11	1	10	.091	11th/12	—	—	—	—	Eliminated
2021	Philippine	NorthPort	11	3	5	.375	5th/12	2	0	2	.000	Quarterfinals
2021	Governors'	NorthPort	11	5	6	.455	9th/12	—	—	—	—	Eliminated
Totals			128	47	78	.376	Playoff totals	15	4	11	.267	0 championships

Preceded by Ato Agustin	PBA Most Improved Player; 1992	Succeeded by Vergel Meneses
Preceded by Bert Flores	UAAP Coach of the Year; 2006	Succeeded by Franz Pumaren
Preceded by Nel Parado	UST Growling Tigers head coach 2006–2014	Succeeded by Bong dela Cruz
Preceded by Richie Ticzon (Interim)	GlobalPort Batang Pier head coach 2014	Succeeded by Eric Gonzales
Preceded by Eric Gonzales	GlobalPort Batang Pier head coach 2015	Succeeded by Eric Gonzales
Preceded by Franz Pumaren	GlobalPort Batang Pier head coach 2017	Succeeded by incumbent
Preceded by Bal David	UST Growling Tigers head coach 2023–present	Succeeded by incumbent
