= St. Joseph School (Conway, Arkansas) =

Private school in Arkansas, United States

Location
- 502 Front Street; Conway, Arkansas 72032; United States; 35°5′7″N 92°26′16″W

Information
- Type: Private, Coeducational
- Religious affiliation: Roman Catholic
- Established: 1879 (147 years ago)
- CEEB code: 040500
- NCES School ID: A0700070
- Principal: Matthew Tucker
- Grades: K–12
- Hours in school day: 7.5
- Colors: Purple and gold
- Mascot: Bulldog
- Team name: Bulldogs
- Affiliation: Diocese of Little Rock
- Website: www.stjosephconway.org

St. Joseph School is a private, Catholic PreK-12 school in Conway, Arkansas, United States. It is located in the Roman Catholic Diocese of Little Rock. It is often referred to as St. Joseph School, Conway.
