= Japs Cuan =

Filipino basketball coach

UST Growling Tigers
- Title: Assistant coach
- League: UAAP

Personal information
- Listed height: 5 ft 7 in (1.70 m)

Career information
- High school: UST (Manila)
- College: UST
- PBA draft: 2013: undrafted
- Position: Point guard
- Coaching career: 2009–present

Career history

Coaching
- 2009: UST (assistant/strength and conditioning)
- 2016–2017: Alab Pilipinas (assistant)
- 2023–present: UST (assistant)
- 2023–2024: Iloilo United Royals (assistant)

Career highlights
- UAAP champion (2006)

John Paul Cuan is a Filipino professional basketball coach and former collegiate player who is currently an assistant coach for the UST Growling Tigers of the University Athletic Association of the Philippines (UAAP).

== Career ==
=== Playing ===
Cuan played for UST Growling Tigers under Pido Jarencio, and one of his notable years with the team was playing in the finals against Ateneo Blue Eagles in 2006. They won the finals series even though they lost in game 1, the championship was won, as the last was in 1996.

In 2008, in only the third game of the Tigers, he suffered a torn meniscus on his knee which required surgery. He was able to return in the second round while playing limited minutes. He graduated in the same year with business administration course.

He applied for PBA draft in 2013, but went undrafted.

=== Coaching ===
In 2016, he became an assistant coach for Alab Pilipinas.

In 2023, Cuan was tapped as an assistant coach by his alma mater when his former mentor Jarencio was re-hired as head coach.

Cuan was also served as an assistant coach for the Iloilo United Royals with his brother.

== Personal ==
He is the brother of former De La Salle Green Archer and UAAP champion, Mac Cuan.
