= Khasim Mirza =

Filipino basketball player

Personal information
- Born: September 14, 1986 (age 40) Philippines
- Listed height: 6 ft 4 in (1.93 m)
- Listed weight: 185 lb (84 kg)

Career information
- College: UST
- PBA draft: 2010: 2nd round, 16th overall pick
- Drafted by: Meralco Bolts
- Playing career: 2009–2012; 2019–2022
- Position: Small forward

Career history
- 2009–2010: Philippine Patriots
- 2010: Meralco Bolts
- 2011–2012: Shopinas.com Clickers
- 2019–2020: Imus Bandera
- 2021–2022: GenSan Warriors

Career highlights
- ABL champion (2010)

Khasim Mirza (born September 14, 1986) is a Filipino former professional basketball player.

Born to an Indian father and a Filipina mother, Mirza played for the University of Santo Tomas Growling Tigers in the University Athletic Association of the Philippines for three seasons (2007 to 2009). He then played for the Philippine Patriots in the Asean Basketball League from 2009 to 2010 before being drafted 16th overall in the second round of the 2010 PBA draft by PBA expansion team Meralco Bolts.

== PBA career statistics ==
Legend
| GP | Games played | MPG | Minutes per game |
| FG% | Field-goal percentage | 3P% | 3-point field-goal percentage | FT% | Free-throw percentage |
| RPG | Rebounds per game | APG | Assists per game | SPG | Steals per game |
| BPG | Blocks per game | PPG | Points per game | **Bold** | Career high |

=== Season-by-season averages ===
| Year | Team | GP | MPG | FG% | 3P% | FT% | RPG | APG | SPG | BPG | PPG |
|---|---|---|---|---|---|---|---|---|---|---|---|
| 2010–11 | Meralco | 1 | 4.0 | .000 | — | — | .0 | .0 | .0 | .0 | .0 |
| 2011–12 | Shopinas.com / Air21 | **15** | **12.5** | **.343** | **.308** | **.778** | **2.4** | **.6** | **.2** | **.1** | **4.3** |
| Career | | 16 | 12.0 | .338 | .308 | .778 | 2.3 | .6 | .2 | .1 | 4.1 |
