= Standings (sports) =

Ongoing rankings of contestants in a sports league or tournament

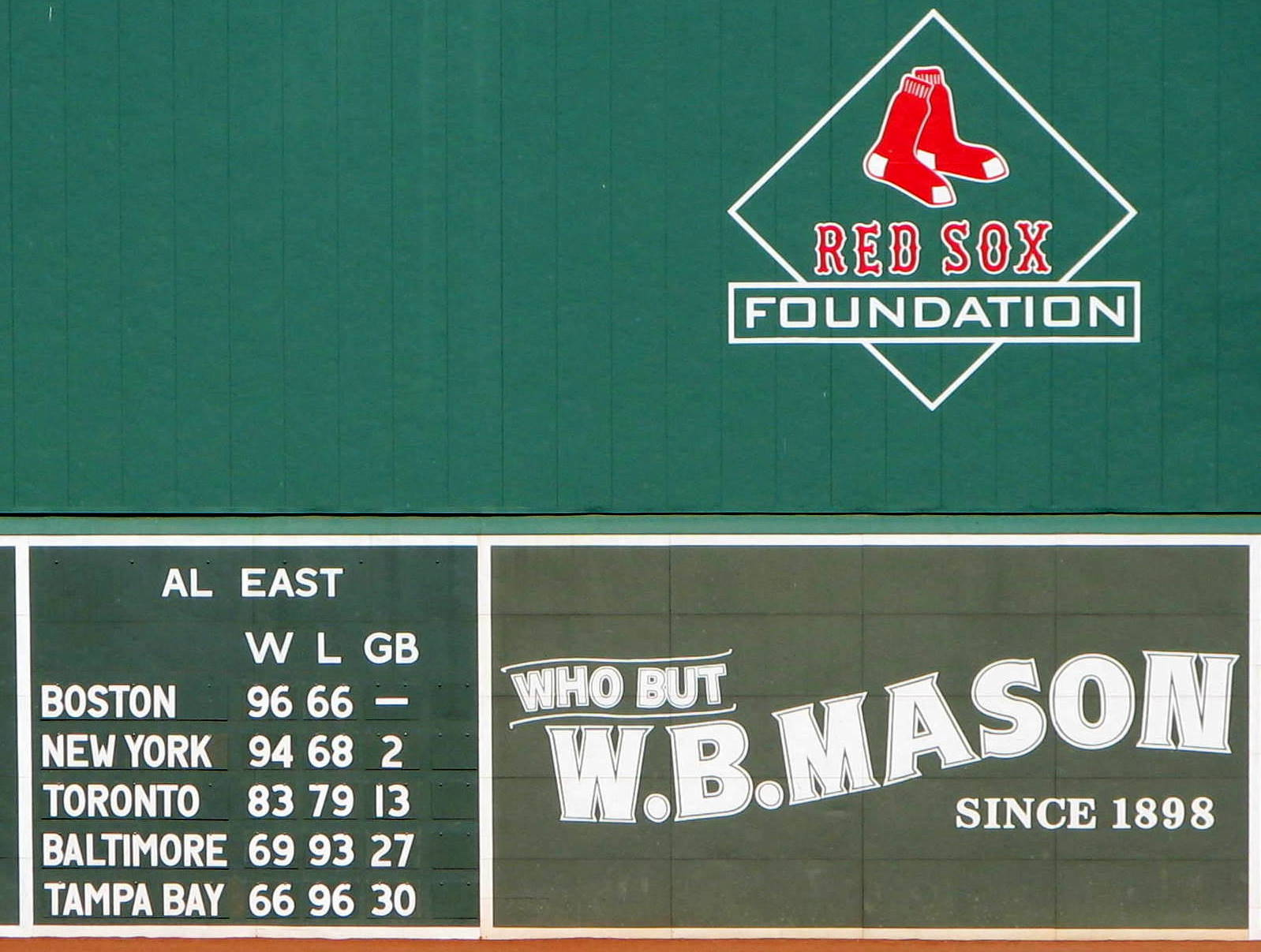
A partial view of the Green Monster at Fenway Park, with standings for the American League East division at the end of the 2007 Major League Baseball season

In sports, standings, rankings, or league tables group teams of a particular league, conference, or division in a chart based on how well each is doing in a particular season of a sports league or competition. These lists are generally published in newspapers and other media, as well as the official web sites of the sports leagues and competitions.

== Formulation ==
The standings shows where each team ranks in their conference or division. Teams may be ranked in terms of simple winning percentage (the proportion of the games played to date which the team won), or based on total points, with differing numbers of points awarded for wins and ties (draws). Many league tables show further statistics and may display:

- wins
- losses
- ties (draws)
- goal differential (Goals scored minus goals conceded)
- goals scored
- goals allowed (conceded)
- home/away win–loss records

Usually, if a league is divided into conferences and divisions, the league table will also be. Often, a less specific table is also included. For example, National Hockey League tables will normally have a detailed table for each division, plus a table for each conference showing just the points totals.

As an example, below is the league table for the Northeast Division of the National Hockey League, as of March 31, 2004:

Northeast Division
	GP	W	L	T	OTL	GF	GA	Pts
x-Boston Bruins	79	40	18	14	7	201	179	101
x-Toronto Maple Leafs	80	43	24	10	3	234	204	99
x-Ottawa Senators	79	41	22	10	6	254	178	98
x-Montreal Canadiens	79	40	28	7	4	201	182	91
Buffalo Sabres	79	36	32	7	4	213	210	85

In the above table, an "x" placed before a team's name shows that the team has qualified for playoff position; other letters may be used to show that a team is guaranteed first place, has been eliminated from contention and so forth. From this table, we can see that Boston, Toronto, Ottawa and Montreal are all guaranteed playoff positions; the absence of a "y" shows that the division championship is still to play for. Meanwhile, because Buffalo has no symbol at all, they are not out of playoff contention, but have yet to clinch a playoff position. The following day, a new league table would appear in newspapers, updated based on the previous night's games. Of course, the above table would also be accompanied by those of the other divisions in the league.

== Instances ==
Applications include:

- In the Olympic Games, each member country (NOC) is ranked based upon gold, silver and bronze medal counts in the Olympic medal rankings.
- In association football (soccer), national teams are ranked in the FIFA World Rankings, the Women's World Rankings and, unofficially, in the World Football Elo Ratings.
- In baseball and softball, national teams are ranked in the WBSC World Rankings.
- In basketball, national teams are ranked in the FIBA World Rankings and the Women's World Rankings.
- In bowls, players are ranked using world rankings.
- In bridge, matchpoint scoring uses fractional ranking to assign the score.
- In chess, players are ranked using the FIDE world rankings.
- In cycling (road), men UCI World Ranking (from 2016), UCI Road World Rankings (1984 to 2004), women UCI Women's Road World Rankings since 1994.
- In cycling track riders and nations are ranked using the UCI Track Cycling World Ranking.
- In golf, the top male golfers are ranked using the Official World Golf Rankings, and the top female golfers are ranked using the Women's World Golf Rankings.
- In ice hockey, national teams are ranked in the IIHF World Ranking.
- In sailing, boats are scored directly using the sum of the ranking.
- In snooker, players are ranked using the Snooker world rankings.
- In squash players are ranked by world ranking men, women.
- In tennis, male and female players are ranked using the ATP rankings and WTA rankings respectively, whilst the ITF rankings are used for national Davis Cup and Fed Cup teams.

== See also ==
- Games behind – in some sports, a common way to reflect the gap between teams
- Group tournament ranking system
- Magic number – in some sports, the number of wins needed to clinch a championship
