= University of Santo Tomas Junior High School =

Junior high school of the University of Santo Tomas

Location
- Benavides Building, UST, Sampaloc, Manila, Philippines; 14°36′38″N 120°59′16″E

Information
- Motto: Committed to Truth, Enkindled by Charity
- Patron saint: St. Thomas Aquinas Blessed Mannes de Guzman
- Established: 6 June 1928
- Principal: Assoc. Prof. Marishirl P. Tropicales, Ph.D.
- Regent: Rev. Fr. Orlando Aceron, OP
- Staff: 98
- Grades: 7 to 10
- Enrollment: 1,200
- Colors: Gold, black, and white
- Song: UST Junior High School Hymn (sung to the tune of "God Save the Tsar!")
- Mascot: Tiger Cubs
- Newspaper: The Aquinian
- Yearbook: Veritas
- Website: ustjhs.ust.edu.ph

The University of Santo Tomas - Junior High School (UST - JHS), formerly called University of Santo Tomas High School, was established on June 6, 1928, and is one of the junior high school departments of the University of Santo Tomas (UST), located at Sampaloc, Manila, Philippines.

UST - JHS offers four years of high school, starting from Grade 7 to 10. The remaining two years of high school (Grade 11 and Grade 12) are available at the University of Santo Tomas Senior High School.

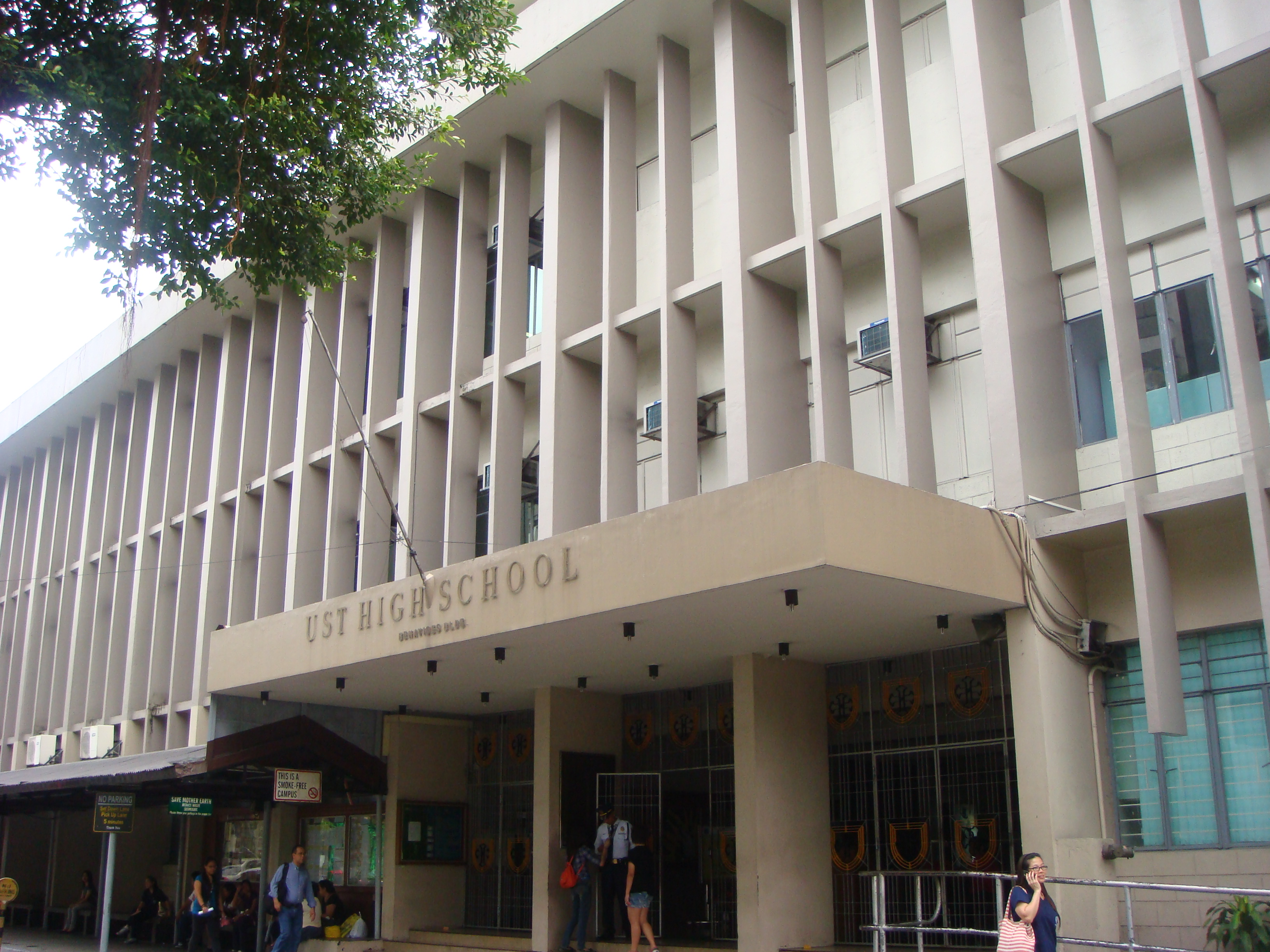
The Benavides Building, which houses the UST Junior High School

UST Junior High School Hymn
The Hymn of UST Junior High School

== Academics ==
AN OVERVIEW

The UST Junior High School offers courses as mandated by the Department of Education on the Basic Education Curriculum. Integration and addition of certain courses are on the testing stage in line with the first ever accreditation attempt of the High School for its 80 years of existence. Currently, the UST Junior High School holds a Level III - Re-Accredited status by the Philippine Accrediting Association of Schools, Colleges and Universities (PAASCU).

== Co-curricular Program ==
The co-curricular program of the High School covers matters regarding clubs and organizations. All the students are required to join one club of their interest and choice. As of 2023, 31 clubs and organizations are recognized.

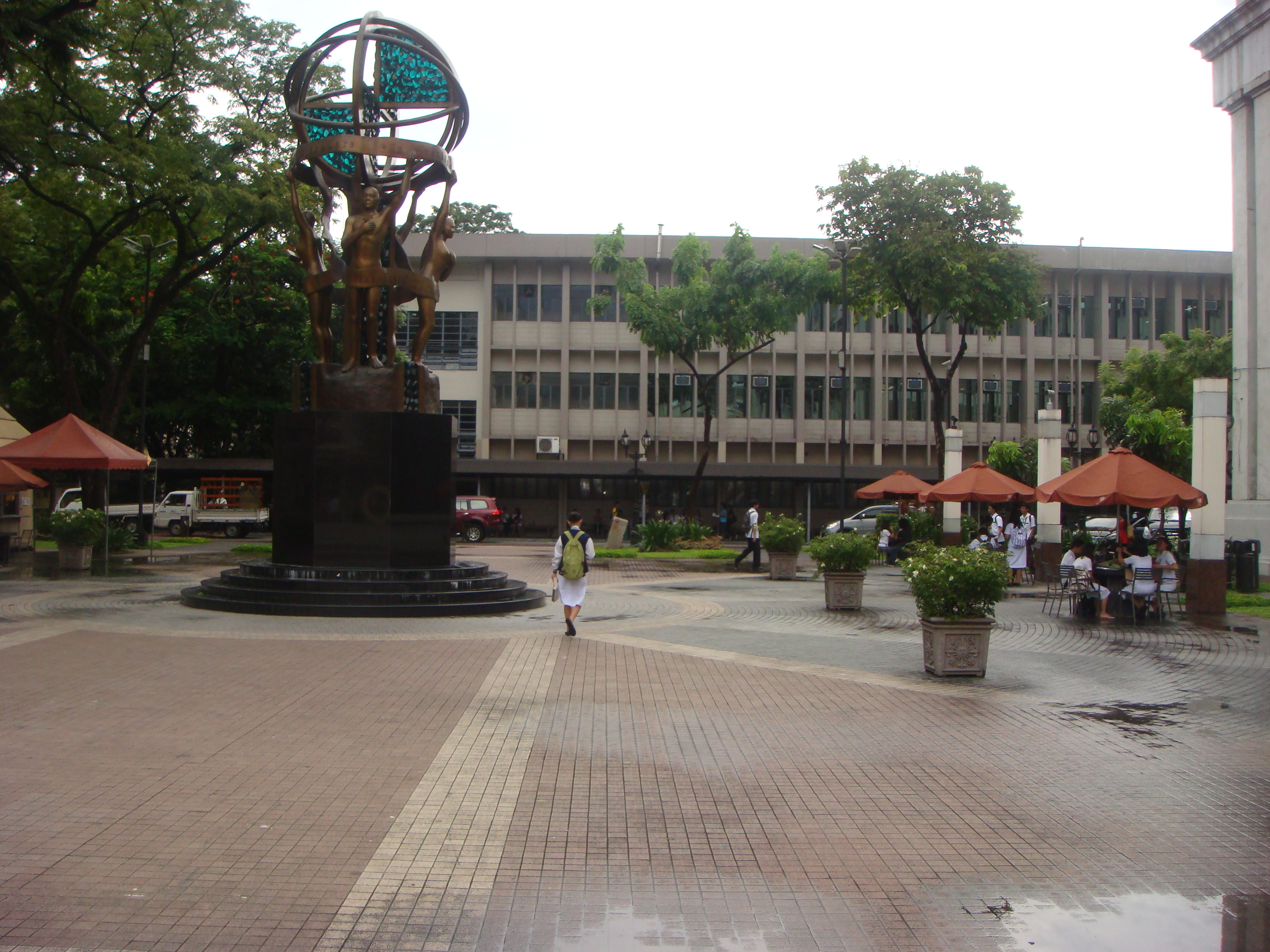
View from the Quadricentennial Park

== Alumni Association ==
The Alumni Association is headed by a set of officers to go over matters concerning the alumni of the school. The Alumni Association has been considered a laudable stakeholder of the school for their contributions for the school at present.

== Athletics ==
The UAAP was founded in 1938 by the University of Santo Tomas, University of the Philippines, Far Eastern University and National University (Philippines). Now, the sports organization includes Ateneo de Manila University, De La Salle University, Adamson University, and the University of the East.

=== General Champion ===
The UST Juniors Division (USTHS) held the General Championship Title last UAAP Season 74, winning various sports titles in taekwondo, swimming, etc. UST Juniors division holds 14 General Championship trophies all in all since 1986.

== Notable alumni ==
- Jose Wendell Capili - writer and academic, Professor, Assistant Vice President for Public Affairs and Director of Alumni Relations, University of the Philippines
- Rhea Dimaculangan - volleyball player
- Kevin Ferrer - basketball player
- J. Neil Garcia - writer and academic, professor and University of the Philippines press director
- Jun Lana - prizewinning playwright, screenwriter, and head writer
- Tetchie Agbayani - actress
- Angel Locsin - actress
- Bino Realuyo - New York-based poet and novelist
- Alfredo E. Pascual - Secretary of Trade and Industry
- Jamie Rivera - singer
- Dindin Santiago - volleyball player
- Antonio Trillanes - Philippine senator
- Alyssa Valdez - volleyball player
- Eula Valdez - actress
- Bentong - Comedian
